= Milia, Paphos =

Milia Μηλιά
- Location in Cyprus
- Coordinates: 34°55′12″N 32°32′23″E
- Country: Cyprus
- District: Paphos District
- Elevation: 1,985 ft (605 m)
- Highest elevation: 2,205 ft (672 m)

Population (2001)
  - Total: 5
- Time zone: UTC+2 (EET)
  - Summer (DST): UTC+3 (EEST)
- Postal code: 8744
- Area code: 6304

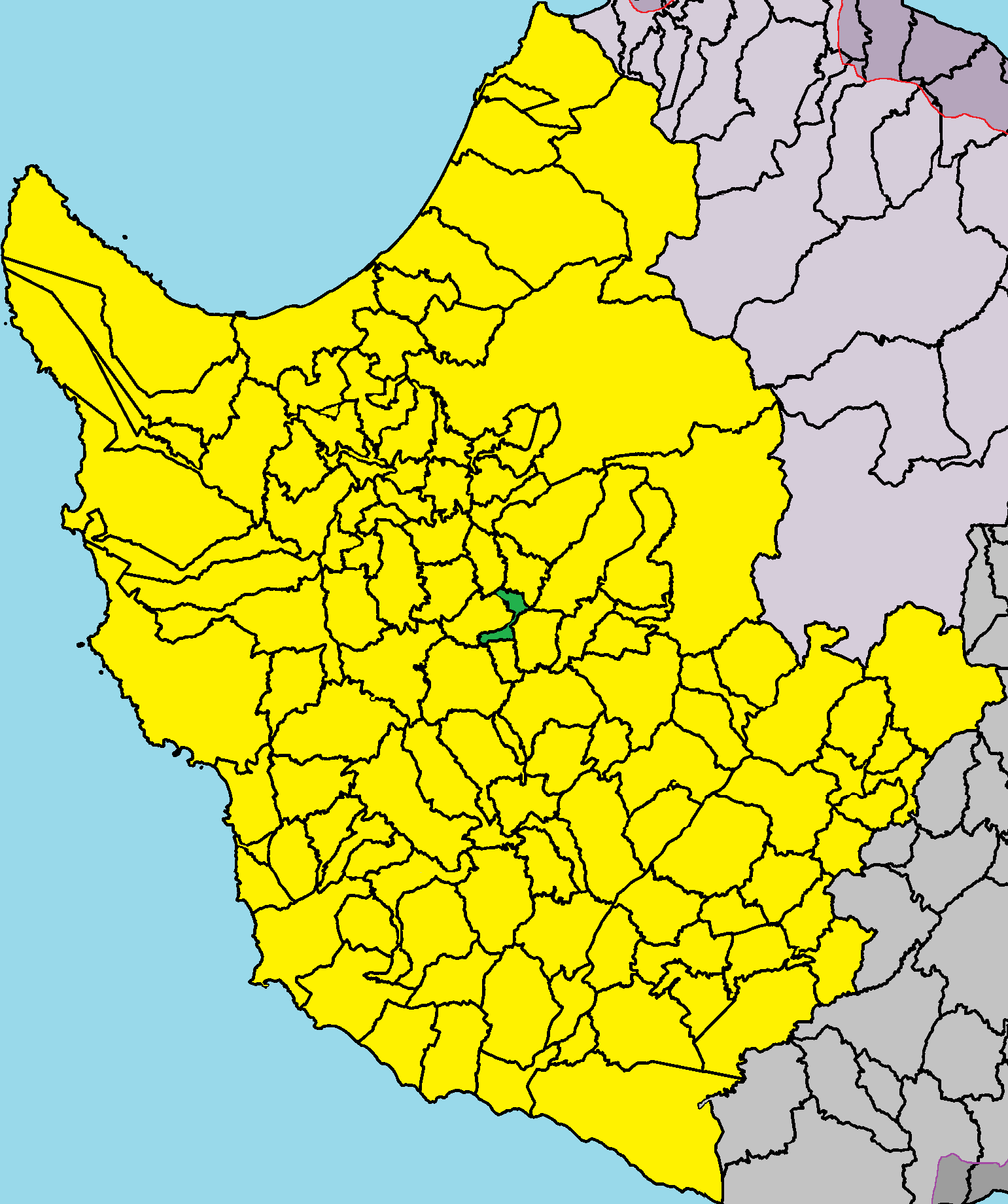
Milia, Paphos in Paphos District.

Milia (Greek: Μηλιά, meaning "Apple tree") is one of the small villages in the Paphos District of Cyprus, situated about 30 kilometers northeast of the homonymous capital of the province of Paphos, almost 100 kilometers northwest of Limassol and 160 kilometers southwest of Nicosia.

Nearby are the settlements Drinia, Fyti and Lasa, while in the wider area there are several hotels and taverns.

== Altitude ==
Milia is located 637 m above sea level.

Climate data for Milia, Cyprus (636 m)
Month	Jan	Feb	Mar	Apr	May	Jun	Jul	Aug	Sep	Oct	Nov	Dec	Year
Mean daily maximum °C (°F)	12.5 (54.5)	13.2 (55.8)	15.0 (59.0)	19.2 (66.6)	23.5 (74.3)	28.1 (82.6)	30.9 (87.6)	31.3 (88.3)	27.8 (82.0)	23.7 (74.7)	19.1 (66.4)	14.5 (58.1)	21.6 (70.8)
Mean daily minimum °C (°F)	5.2 (41.4)	5.0 (41.0)	6.0 (42.8)	8.7 (47.7)	12.4 (54.3)	16.3 (61.3)	18.4 (65.1)	19.1 (66.4)	16.1 (61.0)	13.2 (55.8)	9.8 (49.6)	6.6 (43.9)	11.4 (52.5)
Source: Climate Tsada
