= Philousa Kelokedharon =

Philousa Kelokedharon Φιλούσα Κελοκεδάρων
- Location in Cyprus
- Coordinates: 34°51′8″N 32°44′32″E
- Country: Cyprus
- District: Paphos District
- Elevation: 584 m (1,916 ft)

Population (2001)
  - Total: 23
- Time zone: UTC+2 (EET)
  - Summer (DST): UTC+3 (EEST)
- Postal code: 6216

Philousa Kelokedharon (Greek: Φιλούσα Κελοκεδάρων) is a village in the Paphos District of Cyprus, located 4 km east of Arminou. The village of Filousa Kelokedaron is located in the province of Pafos. It is 40 km from the cities of Pafos and Limassol. Filousa Kelokedaron is one of the first villages of the Darizou valley, 15 km southwest of Platres, in the area of Omodos - Arsos. It is adjacent to the villages of Pretori, Kedares and Agios Nikolaos.

== Topography ==
Located at an altitude of 590 meters in the Diarizos valley.
