= Fasoula =

Fasoula may refer to:

- Fasoula, Limassol, Cyprus
- Fasoula, Paphos, Cyprus
- Fasoula (surname)
