= Mirmikofou =

Abandoned settlement in Paphos District, Cyprus

Mirmikofou: Μιρμικόφου (Greek); Mirmigof (Turkish)
- Location within Cyprus
- Coordinates: 35°0′56.35″N 32°27′49.32″E
- Country: Cyprus
- District: Paphos
- Elevation: 180 m (590 ft)

Population
  - Total: 0
- Time zone: UTC+2 (EET)
  - Summer (DST): UTC+3 (EEST)
- Postal code: 8883

Mirmikofou (Greek: Μιρμικόφου, Turkish: Mirmigof) is an abandoned settlement in Cyprus. Abandoned in 1958 the settlement is nominally located within the boundaries of Pelathousa. Settlement is located around 1.5 km southwest of Pelathousa and 5 km southeast of Polis. There is a stream of same name and a church named Agia Marina within the village.

== Etymology ==
The precise origin of the settlement name is unknown. Simos Menardos had refused to suggest an origin due to assumed corruption of the word. However, J. C. Goodwin had claimed the origin of the name is the word mirmigofolia(μυρμιγκοφωλιά), meaning "ant nest". In the maps from Middle Ages, a settlement named "Marmica" was recorded in the place of Mirmikofou.

== Population Data ==
Mirmikofou population was mixed, although the village had a clear Turkish Cypriot majority. The entire village was abandoned by the year 1960, with the Turkish population moving to Pelathousa in 1958. The Pelathousa inhabitants, together with those from Mirmikofou, later moved to the areas occupied by the Turkish military during the population transfer overseen by UNFICYP in 1975.

Population Data
Year	Turkish Cypriot	Greek Cypriot	Total
1881	-	-	38
1891	42	0	42
1901	35	1	36
1911	28	0	28
1921	67	11	78
1931	19	6	25
1946	13	2	15
1960	0	0	0
