= Pentalia =

Pentalia Πενταλιά
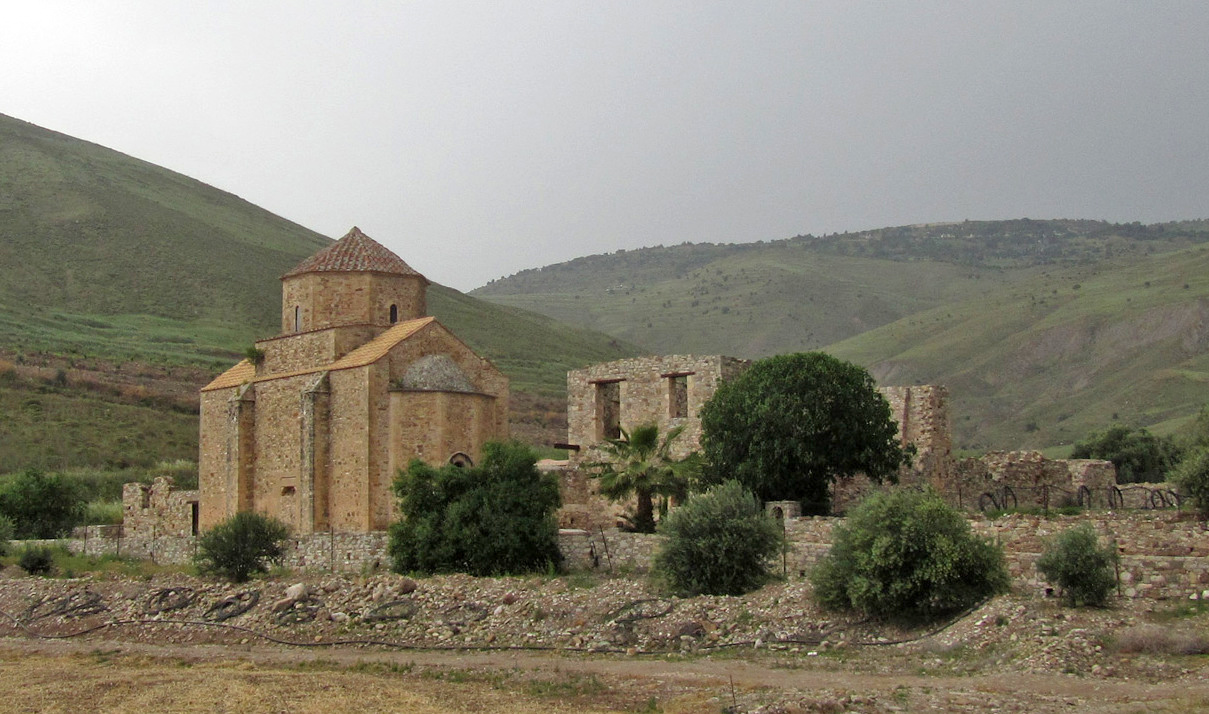
- Panagia tou Sinti Monastery, near Pentalia

- Location in Cyprus
- Coordinates: 34°51′21″N 32°37′13″E
- Country: Cyprus
- District: Paphos District
- Elevation: 703 m (2,306 ft)

Population (2001)
  - Total: 74
- Time zone: UTC+2 (EET)
  - Summer (DST): UTC+3 (EEST)
- Postal code: 8650

Pentalia (Greek: Πενταλιά) is a village in the Paphos District of Cyprus, located 6 km (3.7 mi) north of Amargeti. Near Pentalia is the Panagia tou Sinti Monastery (Greek: Παναγία του Σίντη), dedicated to the Virgin Mary. The monastery was founded in the 16th century. It received a Europa Nostra award in 1997 for its restoration and conservation. Built at an altitude of 540 metres (1,770 ft) on a steep slope overlooking the Xeros river valley (or Asprokremos), Pentalia is the third village in terms of agricultural land size in the province and consists of two settlements, the old and the new. In the old settlement the older character of building is evident, as there are many traditional stone-built houses along its small narrow streets. In the new settlement, modern buildings have been erected, which are mostly used as cottages for people who come from the region but live elsewhere and visit during the summers or the weekends. The division of Pentalia occurred due to the caving-in of land after the 1953 Paphos earthquake, leading to a decision by Republic of Cyprus authorities on the movement of the population in 1954. Since the 1970s, the village has not escaped the waves of urbanisation that hit the island, and today it counts a few permanent residents who live in both districts.

== Topography ==
Pentalia is 703 m (2,306 ft) above sea level. Koupanas is a locality 1.5 km (0.93 mi) situated 500 m above sea level.

== Climate ==
Climate data for Pentalia, Cyprus (662 m)
Month	Jan	Feb	Mar	Apr	May	Jun	Jul	Aug	Sep	Oct	Nov	Dec	Year
Mean daily maximum °F (°C)	54.1 (12.3)	55.2 (12.9)	58.6 (14.8)	66.0 (18.9)	73.9 (23.3)	82.2 (27.9)	87.1 (30.6)	87.6 (30.9)	81.9 (27.7)	74.5 (23.6)	66.2 (19.0)	57.7 (14.3)	70.4 (21.3)
Mean daily minimum °F (°C)	40.8 (4.9)	40.3 (4.6)	42.4 (5.8)	47.3 (8.5)	54.1 (12.3)	61.2 (16.2)	64.9 (18.3)	66 (19)	61 (16)	55 (13)	49.3 (9.6)	43.5 (6.4)	52.2 (11.2)
Source: https://en.climate-data.org/
