= Vretsia =

Vretsia: Βρέτσια (Greek); Vretça (Turkish)
- Location in Cyprus
- Coordinates: 34°53′27″N 32°39′25″E
- Country: Cyprus
- District: Paphos District

Population (2001)
  - Total: 0
- Time zone: UTC+2 (EET)
  - Summer (DST): UTC+3 (EEST)
- Postal code: 6226

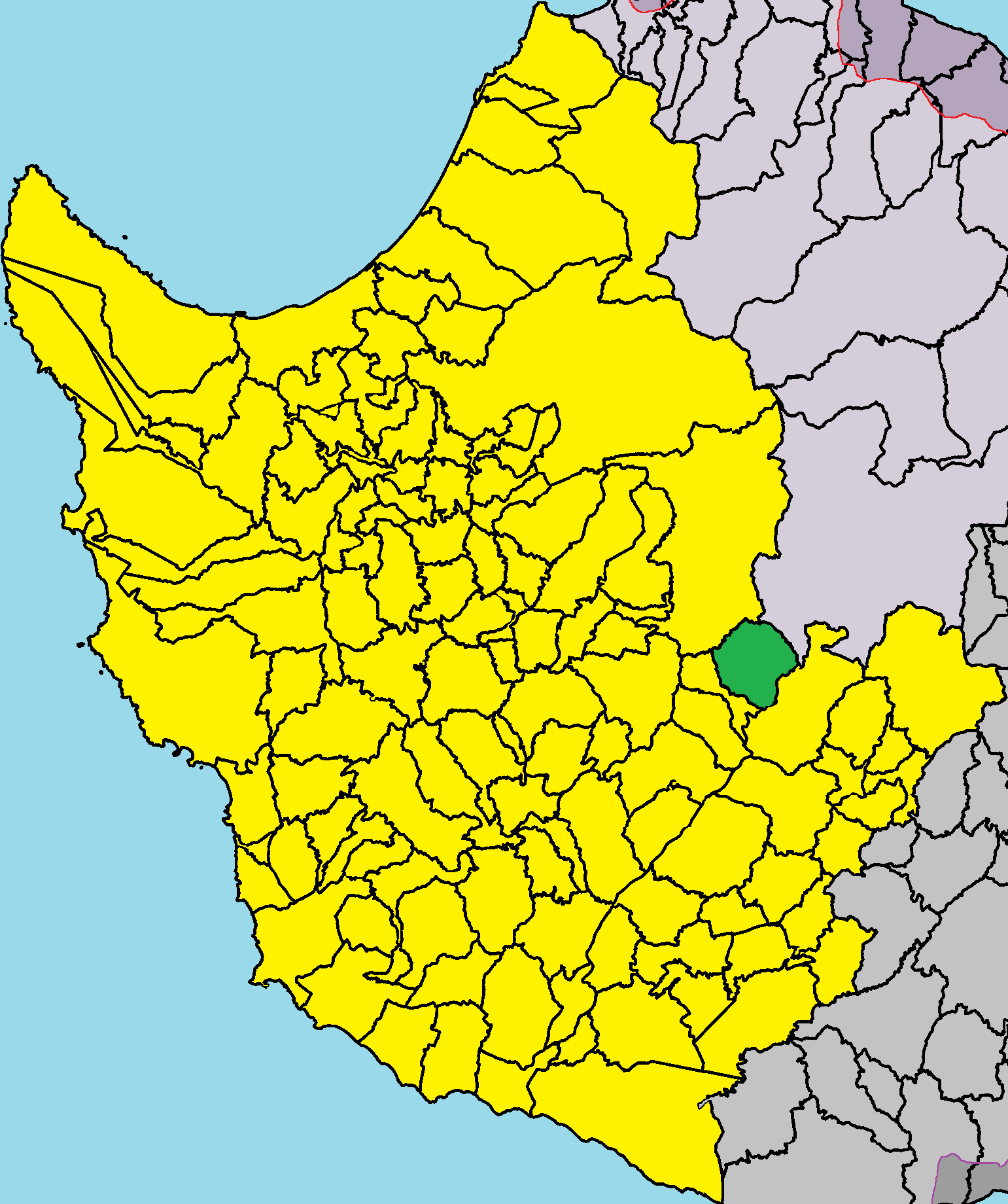
Vretsia is in the Paphos District of Cyprus.

Vretsia (Greek: Βρέτσια, Turkish: Vretça) is an abandoned Turkish Cypriot village in the Paphos District of Cyprus, located 4 kilometres (2.5 mi) east of Koilineia. After the 1974 Turkish invasion of Cyprus, Turkish-Cypriot natives of the village abandoned their properties and moved to the north of Cyprus.
