= Foinikas, Cyprus =

Phinikas
- Φοίνικας (Greek) Finike (Turkish)
- Location in Cyprus
- Coordinates: 34°45′11″N 32°34′6″E
- Country: Cyprus
- District: Paphos District

Population (2001)
  - Total: 0
- Time zone: UTC+2 (EET)
  - Summer (DST): UTC+3 (EEST)

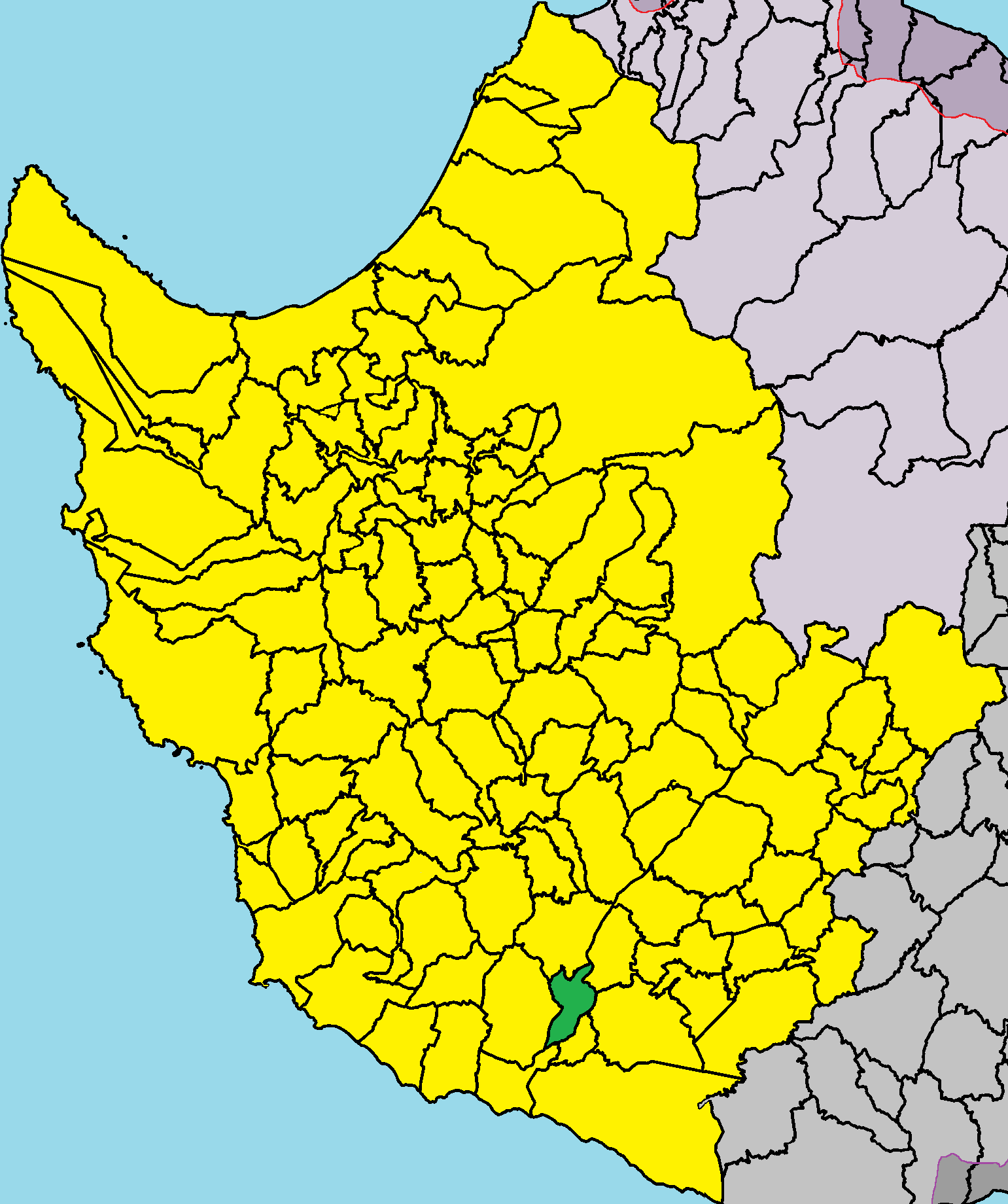
Foinikas in Paphos district.

Phinikas (Greek: Φοίνικας, also spelled Φοίνηξ in Katharevousa and Phoenix in English, meaning Palm tree, Turkish: Finike) is an abandoned village in the Paphos District of Cyprus, located 3 km northeast of Anarita.

== See also ==
- Ghost town
