= Maronas, Cyprus =

Maronas Μάρωνας
- Location in Cyprus
- Coordinates: 34°46′6″N 32°40′6″E
- Country: Cyprus
- District: Paphos District

Population (2021)
  - Total: 28
- Time zone: UTC+2 (EET)
  - Summer (DST): UTC+3 (EEST)

Maronas (Greek: Μάρωνας) is an abandoned village in the Paphos District of Cyprus, located 3 km north of Archimandrita. It was likely named after Saint Maron.
