= Ayia Marina Kelokedharon =

Ayia Marina Kelokedharon Αγία Μαρίνα Κελοκεδάρων
- Village
- Location in Cyprus
- Coordinates: 34°49′45″N 32°37′0″E
- Country: Cyprus
- District: Paphos District

Population (2001)
  - Total: 31
- Time zone: UTC+2 (EET)
  - Summer (DST): UTC+3 (EEST)

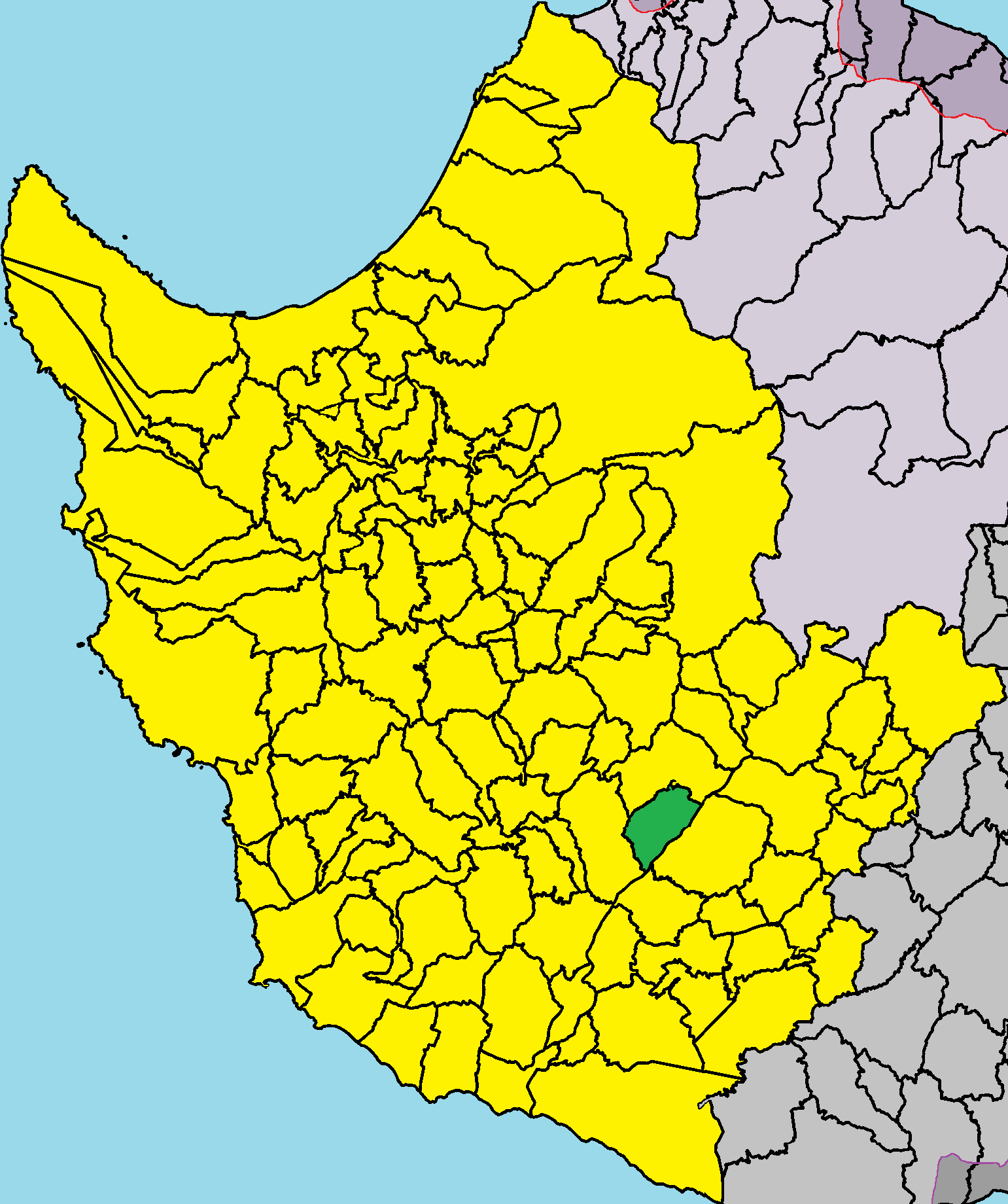

Ayia Marina Kelokedharon (Greek: Αγία Μαρίνα Κελοκεδάρων) is a village located in the Paphos District of Cyprus, east of Paphos near the town of Kelokedhara.
