= Kinousa =

Kinousa Κινουσα
- Location in Cyprus
- Coordinates: 35°2′1″N 32°30′23″E
- Country: Cyprus
- District: Paphos District

Population (2001)
  - Total: 72
- Time zone: UTC+2 (EET)
  - Summer (DST): UTC+3 (EEST)
- Postal code: 6361

Kinousa (Greek: Κινουσα) is a village in the Paphos District of Cyprus, located 3 km (1.9 mi) southeast of Makounda.
