= Filousa =

Filousa may refer to:

- Filousa Chrysochous, Paphos District, Cyprus
- Filousa Kelokedaron, Paphos District, Cyprus
