= Mamonia =

Mamonia Μαμώνια
- Location in Cyprus
- Coordinates: 34°46′10″N 32°38′11″E
- Country: Cyprus
- District: Paphos District

Population (2001)
  - Total: 40
- Time zone: UTC+2 (EET)
  - Summer (DST): UTC+3 (EEST)
- Postal code: 6204

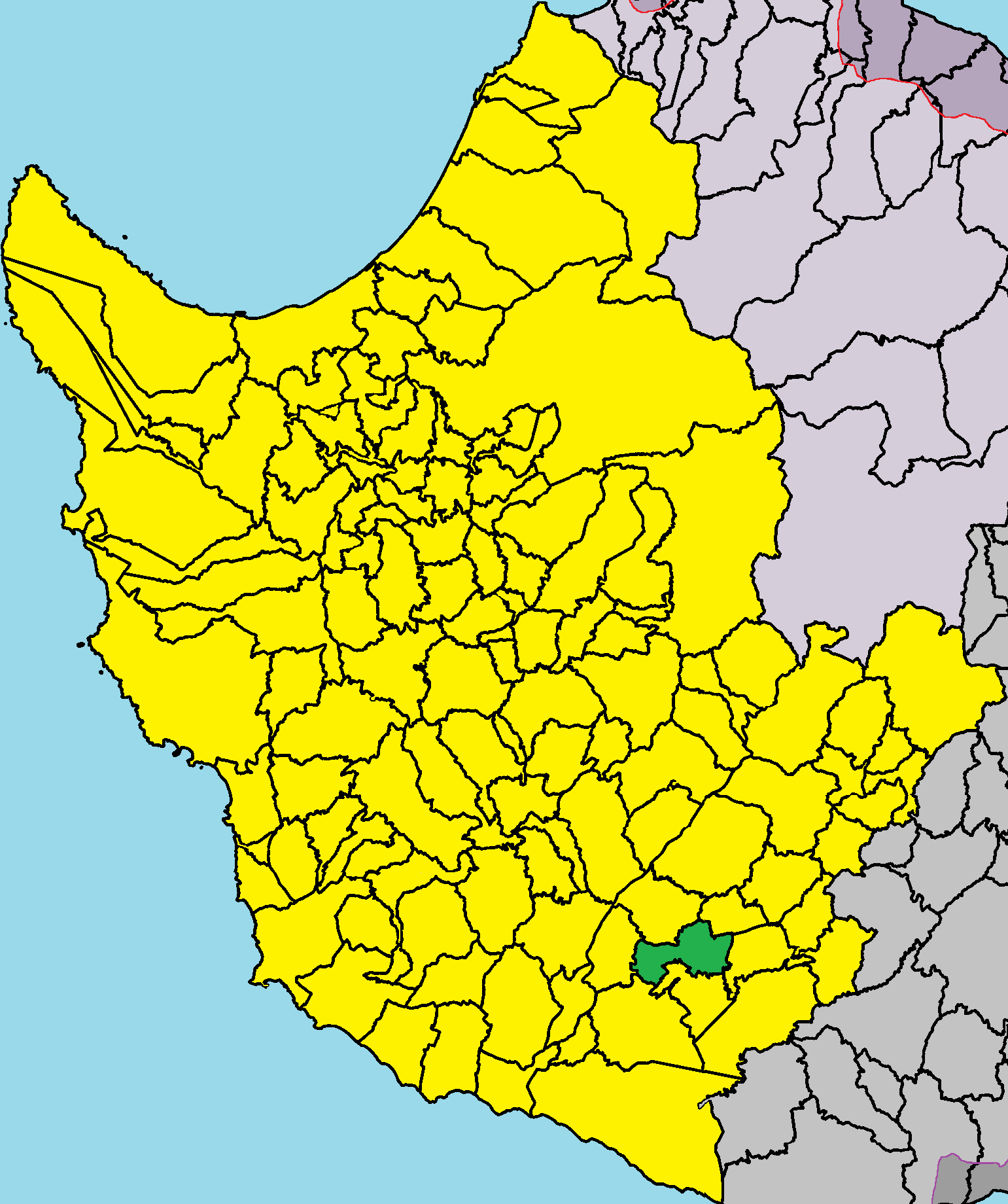
Mamonia in Paphos District.

Mamonia (Greek: Μαμώνια) is a village in the Paphos District of Cyprus, located 8 km northeast of Nikokleia.
