= Mousere =

Mousere Μούσερε
- Location in Cyprus
- Coordinates: 34°46′16″N 32°42′55″E
- Country: Cyprus
- District: Paphos District

Population (2001)
  - Total: 0
- Time zone: UTC+2 (EET)
  - Summer (DST): UTC+3 (EEST)
- Postal code: 6202

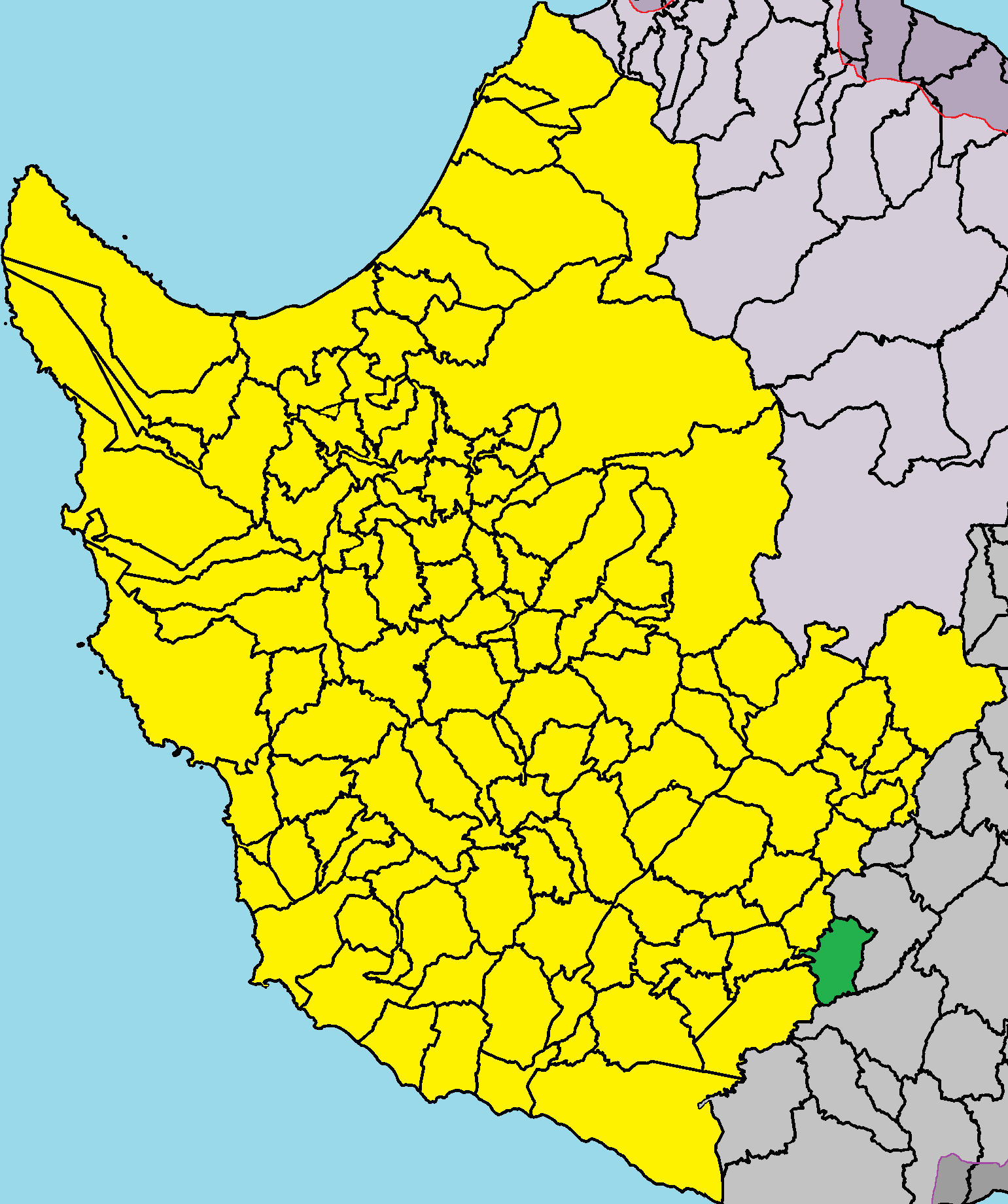
Mousere in Paphos District.

Mousere (Greek: Μούσερε) is a Greek Cypriot village in the Paphos District of Cyprus, located 5 km (3.1 mi) northeast of Archimandrita. It is built on an altitude of 550 m (1,800 ft) above sea level and it is 33 km (21 mi) from Pafos city centre.

In 1960, the village had a population of 69 people. In the municipal elections of 2011, Mousere had 6 pensioner voters registered although they have not been included in the 1992 and 2001 census reports due to their unwillingness to register for the census.

Ioanna Meletiou was elected Community President.

Mousere has 2 churches and 10 standing houses. The main church is dedicated to Timios Prodromos and the second to Ayia Sophia.

Mousere has no urban planning zone. Within Mousere there are 11.9 hectares (29 acres) of cultivated land, whilst 37.35 hectares (92.3 acres) are still uncultivated. Moreover, there are 2.21 hectares (5.5 acres) of pasture land. Mousere has experienced a cataclysmic decline in its livestock population. Whereas in 1994 there had been 261 sheep, 445 goats and 40 chickens in 2009, this had been eradicated to 0.
