= Eledio =

Eledio Ελεδιώ
- Location in Cyprus
- Coordinates: 34°48′34″N 32°34′3″E
- Country: Cyprus
- District: Paphos District

Population (2001)
  - Total: 22
- Time zone: UTC+2 (EET)
  - Summer (DST): UTC+3 (EEST)
- Postal code: 6116

Eledio (Greek: Ελεδιώ) is a village in the Paphos District of Cyprus, located 1 km northeast of Axylou.
