= Lasa, Cyprus =

Lasa Λάσα
- Location in Cyprus
- Coordinates: 34°55′30″N 32°31′39″E
- Country: Cyprus
- District: Paphos District
- Elevation: 611 m (2,005 ft)

Population (2001)
  - Total: 91
- Time zone: UTC+2 (EET)
  - Summer (DST): UTC+3 (EEST)
- Postal code: 6307

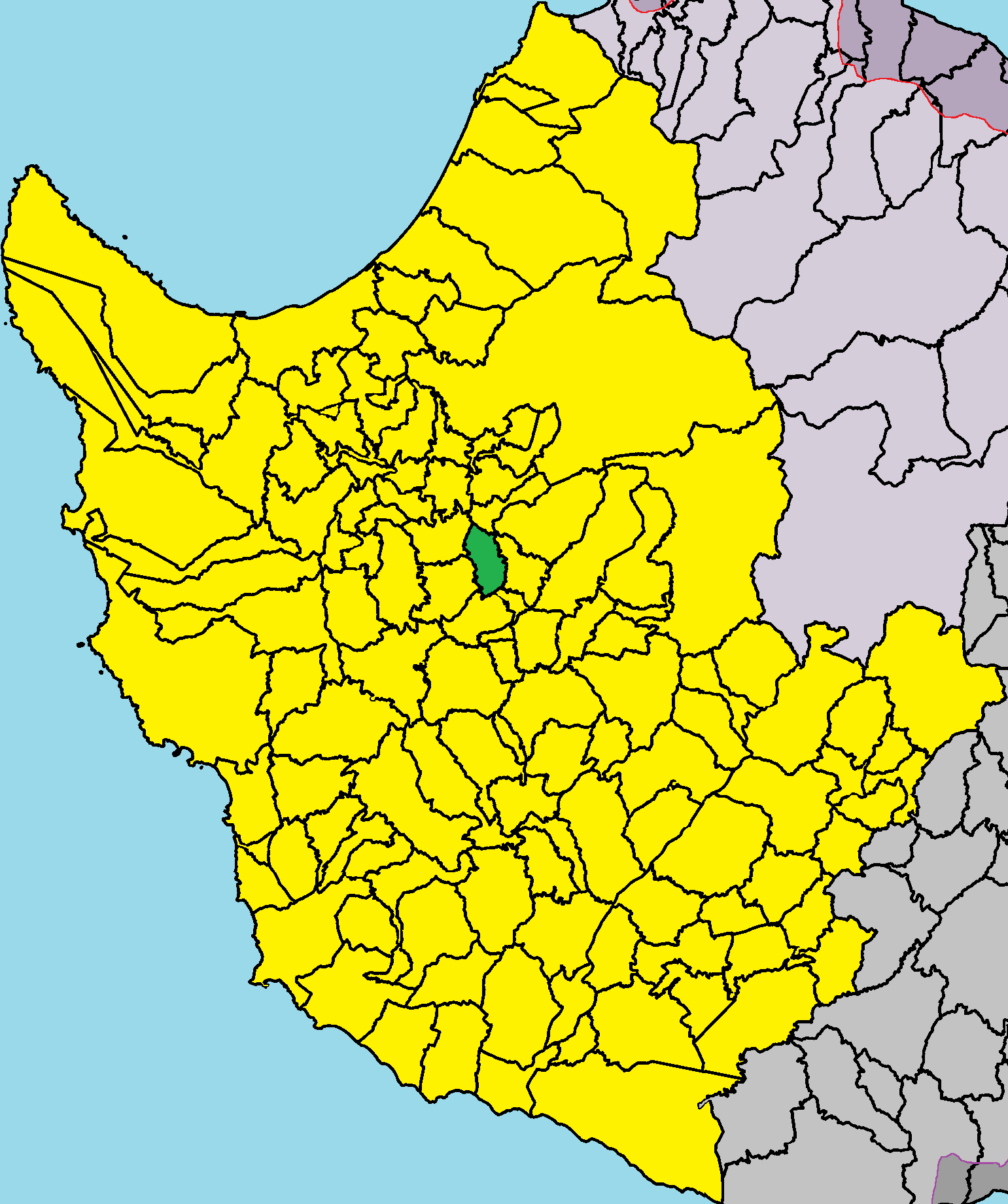
Map of the Paphos district

Lasa (Greek: Λάσα) is a village in the Paphos District of Cyprus, located 2 km west of Fyti. Lasa is a small village in the province of Paphos in Cyprus and it is situated 27 kilometers northeast of the homonymous city, 82 kilometers northwest of Limassol and 151 kilometers southwest of Nicosia.

A small community situated at 600 m, with approximately 100 residents is nearby Drinia, Drimou, and Lasa.
