= Akoursos =

Akoursos Ακουρσός
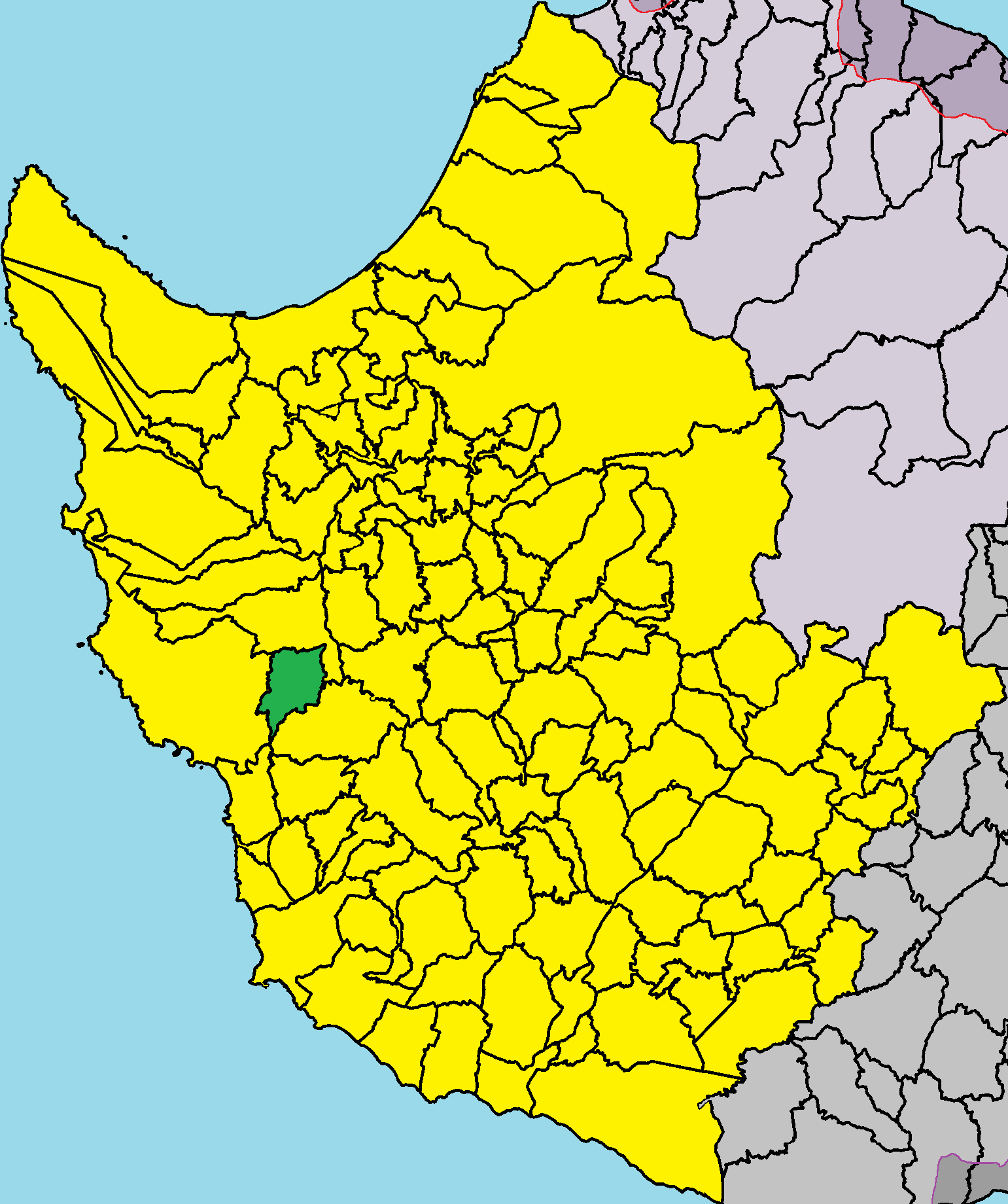
- Map of Akoursos in Paphos district.

- Location in Cyprus
- Coordinates: 34°53′10″N 32°25′17″E
- Country: Cyprus
- District: Paphos District
- Elevation: 410 m (1,350 ft)

Population (2001)
  - Total: 38
- Time zone: UTC+2 (EET)
  - Summer (DST): UTC+3 (EEST)
- Postal code: 6130

Akoursos (Greek: Ακουρσός) is a village in the Paphos District of Cyprus, located 3 km south of Kathikas. Akoursos is located at 410 metres above sea level. It receives approximately 650 mm of rainfall annually.

== Naming ==
The name of the village means the “running water” in the Turkish language (Akarsu), and is a product of paraphrasing by the locals in 1958.

== Places Nearby ==
Finally, Akoursos is bordered by the tourist town of Pegia and the village of Kathikas.
