= Faleia =

Faleia Falya Gökçebel
- Location in Cyprus
- Coordinates: 34°51′35″N 32°35′21″E
- Country: Cyprus
- District: Paphos District

Population (2011)
  - Total: 2

Faleia (Greek: Φάλεια or Φάλια; Turkish: Falya or Gökçebel) is a village in the Paphos District of Cyprus, located 3 km south of Agios Fotios. Prior to 1974, it was inhabited exclusively by about 200 Turkish Cypriots of Gurbeti Ancestry. As of 2011, only 2 people lived in Faleia. The village is now in a desolate state.

A view from Faleia during January 2012	Stone houses of Faleia
