= Skoulli =

Skoulli Σκούλλι
- Location in Cyprus
- Coordinates: 34°59′0″N 32°27′0″E
- Country: Cyprus
- District: Paphos District

Population (2001)
  - Total: 77
- Time zone: UTC+2 (EET)
  - Summer (DST): UTC+3 (EEST)
- Postal code: 6337

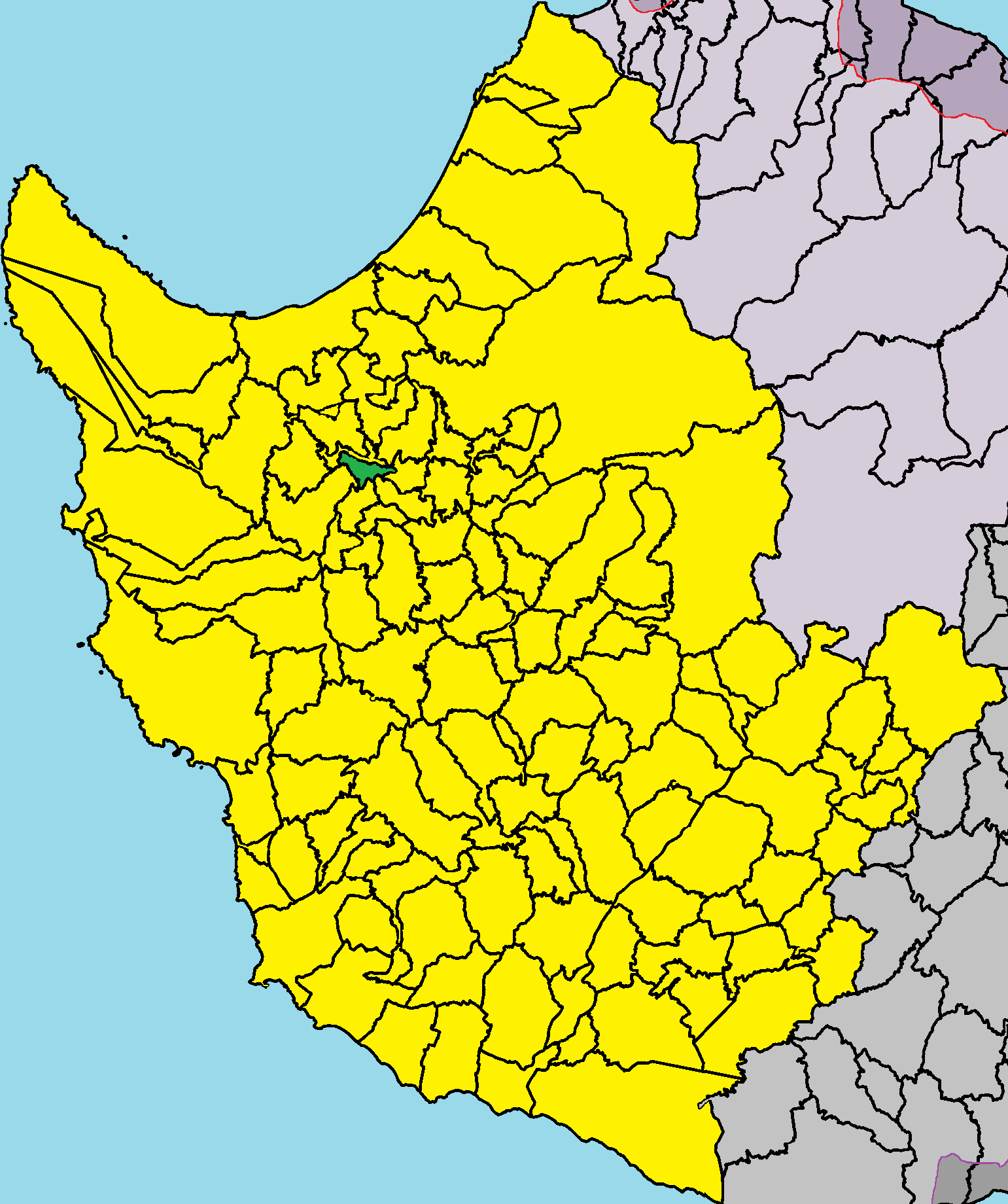
Skoulli in Paphos District.

Skoulli (Greek: Σκούλλι) is a village in the Paphos District of Cyprus, located 7 km south of Polis Chrysochous.
