= Mamountali =

Mamountali Μαμούνταλη
- Location in Cyprus
- Coordinates: 34°55′3″N 32°37′3″E
- Country: Cyprus
- District: Paphos District

Population (2001)
  - Total: 14
- Time zone: UTC+2 (EET)
  - Summer (DST): UTC+3 (EEST)
- Postal code: 6229

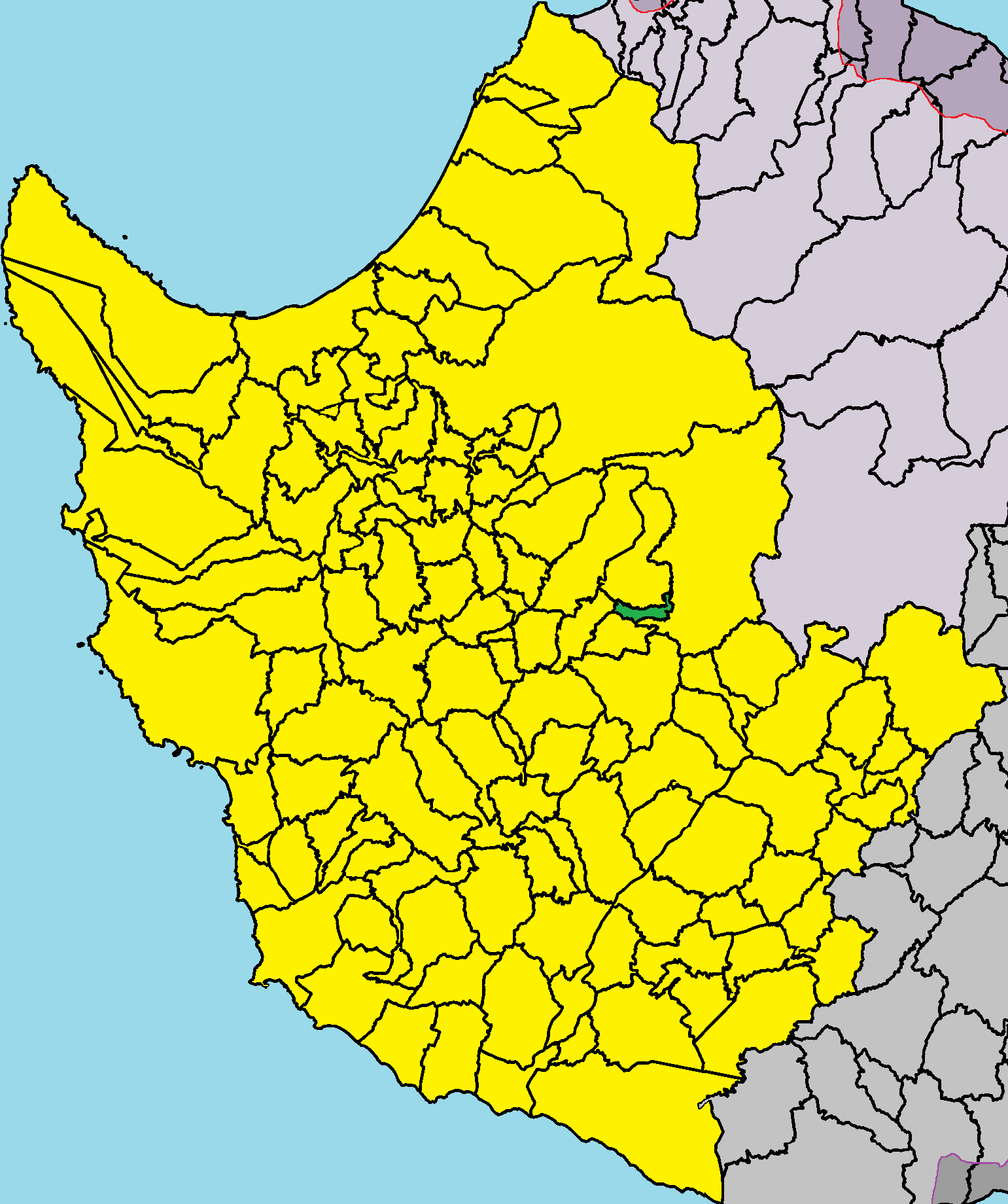

Mamountali (Greek: Μαμούνταλη) is a village in the Paphos District of Cyprus, located 3 km west of Pano Panagia.
