= Lapithiou =

- Location in Cyprus
- Coordinates: 34°54′7″N 32°36′2″E
- Country: Cyprus
- District: Paphos District

Population (2001)
  - Total: (Before 1,974: 300) / (After 1,974: around 40 depending on season)
- Time zone: UTC+2 (EET)
  - Summer (DST): UTC+3 (EEST)
- Postal code: 6228

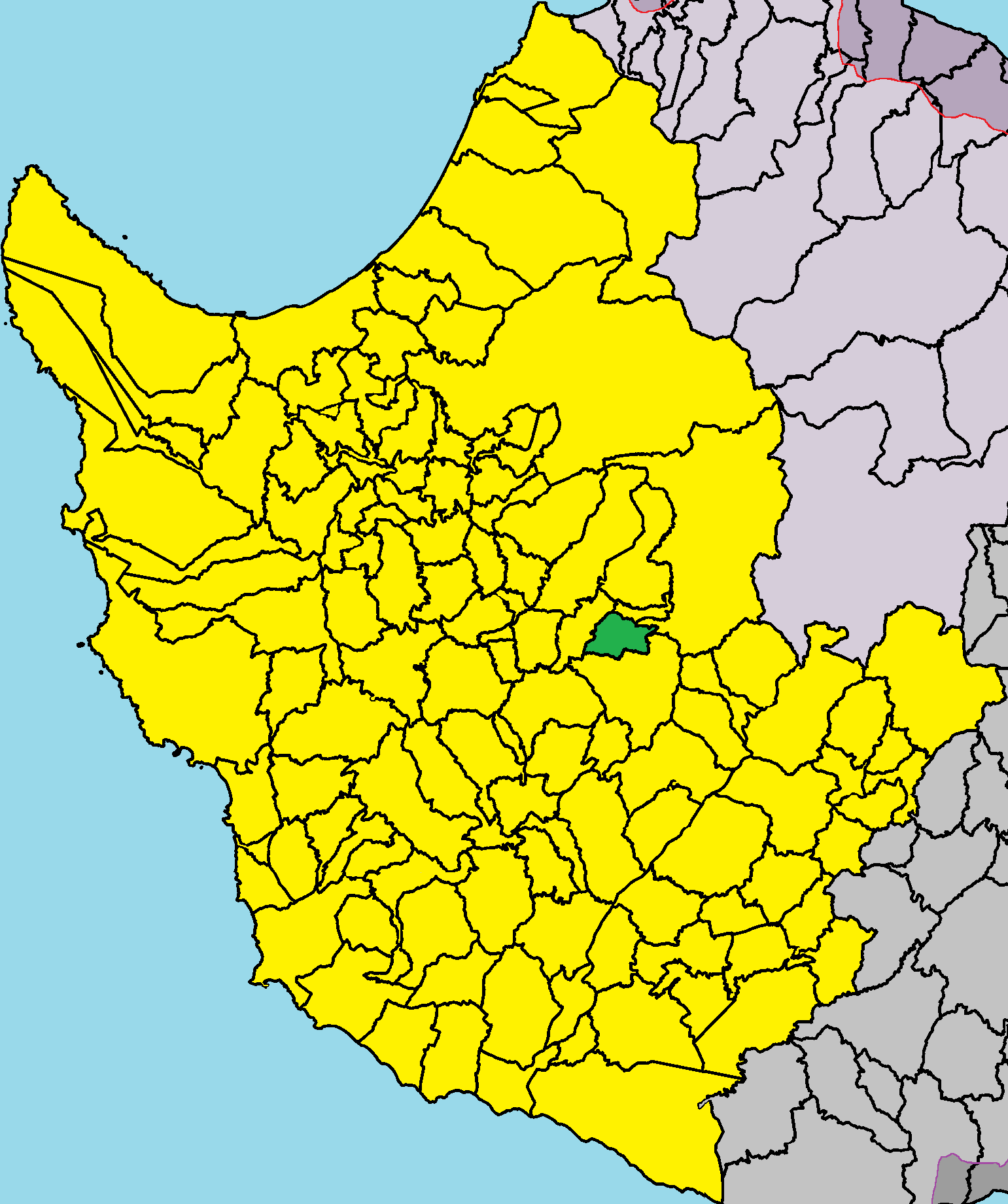
Lapithiou in Paphos District

Lapithiou (Greek: Λαπηθιού, Turkish: Labikyu/Lapityu) is an abandoned village in the Paphos District of Cyprus, located 3 km south of Pano Panagia. Before 1974 it was mainly inhabited by Turkish Cypriots, whom abandoned the village and settled mainly in the occupied parts of Cyprus and London; after the Turkish invasion of Cyprus in 1974. Currently the houses in the village are rented out to foreign and local tourists by the government of Cyprus.
