= Stavrokonnou =

Stavrokonnou Σταυροκόννου
- Location in Cyprus
- Coordinates: 34°47′6″N 32°37′9″E
- Country: Cyprus
- District: Paphos District

Population (2001)
  - Total: 102
- Time zone: UTC+2 (EET)
  - Summer (DST): UTC+3 (EEST)
- Postal code: 6206

Stavrokonnou (Greek: Σταυροκόννου) is a village in the Paphos District of Cyprus, located 12 km north of Kouklia.
