= Simou =

Sesde Σίμου
- Location in Cyprus
- Coordinates: 34°56′29″N 32°30′17″E
- Country: Cyprus
- District: Paphos District

Population (2001)
  - Total: 171
- Time zone: UTC+2 (EET)
  - Summer (DST): UTC+3 (EEST)
- Postal code: 6310

Simou (Greek: Σίμου) is a village in the Paphos District of Cyprus, located 5 km northwest of Fyti at an altitude of 420 meters on the top of a valley slope of the Stavros tis Psokas (or Skarfou) River. A tree there is said to be the oldest tree in Cyprus.
