= Melandra, Cyprus =

Melandra Μελάνδρα
- Location in Cyprus
- Coordinates: 34°59′21″N 32°31′30″E
- Country: Cyprus
- District: Paphos District

Population (2001)
  - Total: 0
- Time zone: UTC+2 (EET)
  - Summer (DST): UTC+3 (EEST)
- Postal code: 6319

Melandra (Greek: Μελάνδρα, also spelled Μελάντρα, Turkish: Beşiktepe) is an abandoned Turkish Cypriot village in the Paphos District of Cyprus, located 2 kilometres (1.2 mi) southeast of Lysos. Prior to 1974, the village was inhabited by Turkish Cypriots. The village is destroyed, apparently by shelling.
