= Karamoullides =

Karamoullides Καραμουλλήδες Kervanyolu
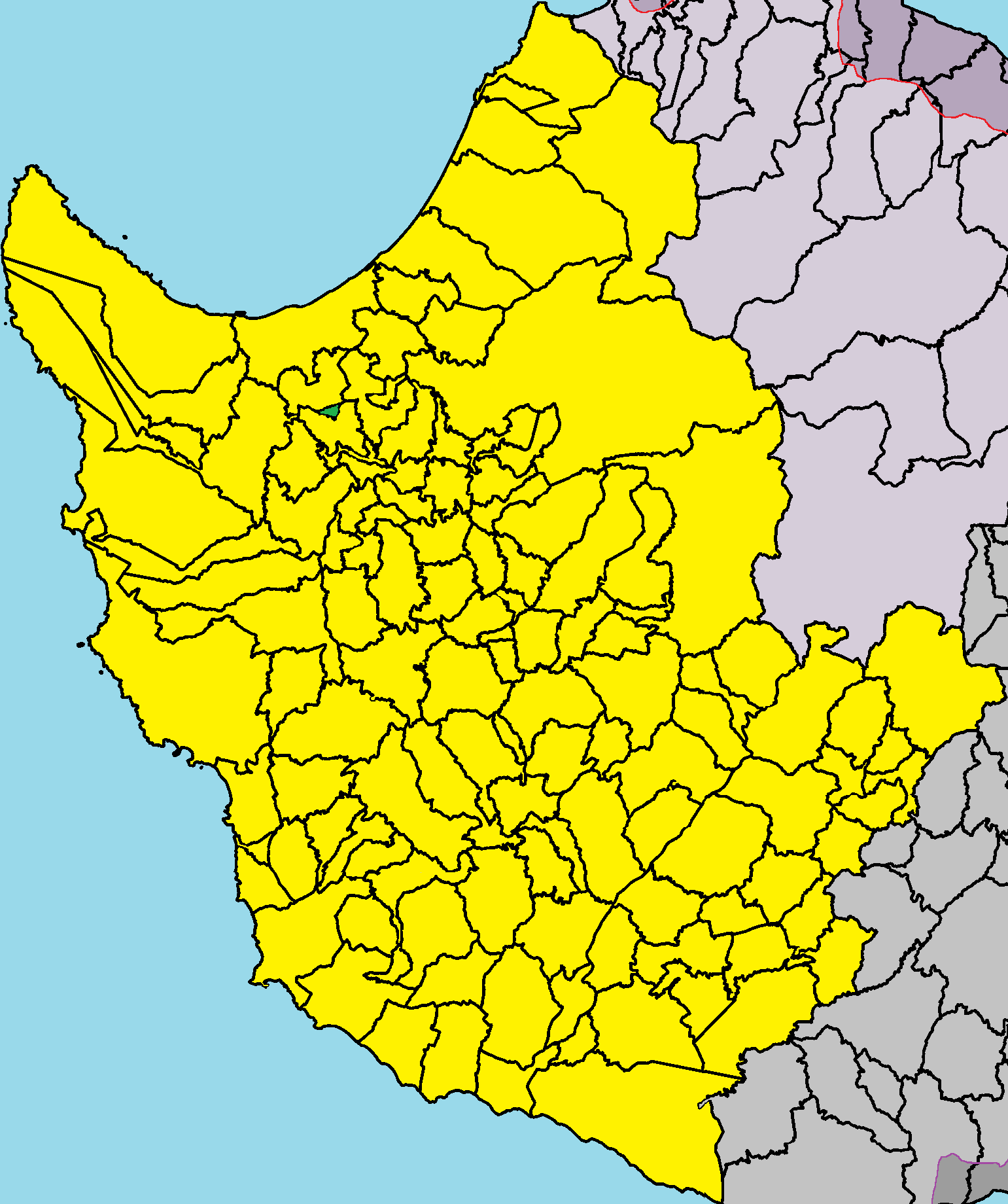

- Location in Cyprus
- Coordinates: 34°59′49″N 32°26′38″E
- Country: Cyprus
- District: Paphos District

Population (2011)
  - Total: 33
- Time zone: UTC+2 (EET)
  - Summer (DST): UTC+3 (EEST)
- Postal code: 6340

Karamoullides (Greek: Καραμουλλήδες, Turkish: Kervanyolu) is a village in the Paphos District of Cyprus, located 4 km (2.5 mi) south of Polis. Before 1974, it was a Turkish Cypriot village with 103 inhabitants in 1973. The inhabitants were relocated to Katokopia and Nikitas and were replaced partially by displaced Greek Cypriots from the north.
