= Nata, Cyprus =

Nata Νατά
- Location within Cyprus
- Coordinates: 34°46′N 32°34′E
- Country: Cyprus
- District: Paphos District

Population (2011)
  - Total: 181

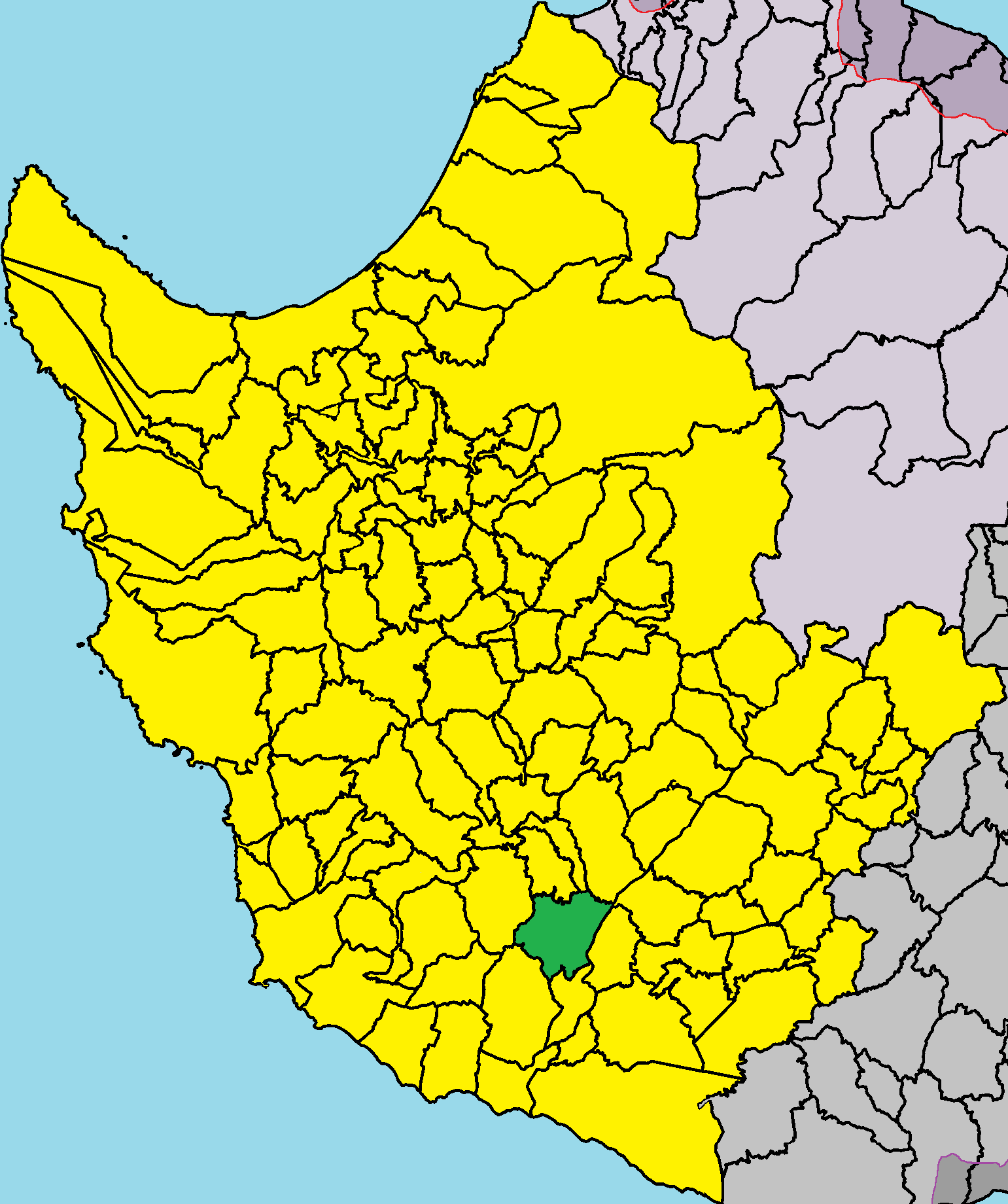
Map highlighting Nata

Nata (Greek: Νατά) is a village in the Paphos District of southwest Cyprus with approximately 300 residents.

The largest dam in Paphos starts at Nata and supplies water to the majority of Paphos District, which has a population of 76,100.

It has an Orthodox church called St. Nicholas (Greek: Άγιος Νικόλαος, Agios Nikolaos) in the centre of the village and another church under renovation built around the 14th century which is heritage listed.
