= Prastio, Paphos =

Prastio Πραστειό
- Village
- Location in Cyprus
- Coordinates: 34°47′11″N 32°41′48″E
- Country: Cyprus
- District: Paphos District

Population (2001)
  - Total: 0
- Time zone: UTC+2 (EET)
  - Summer (DST): UTC+3 (EEST)
- Postal code: 6207

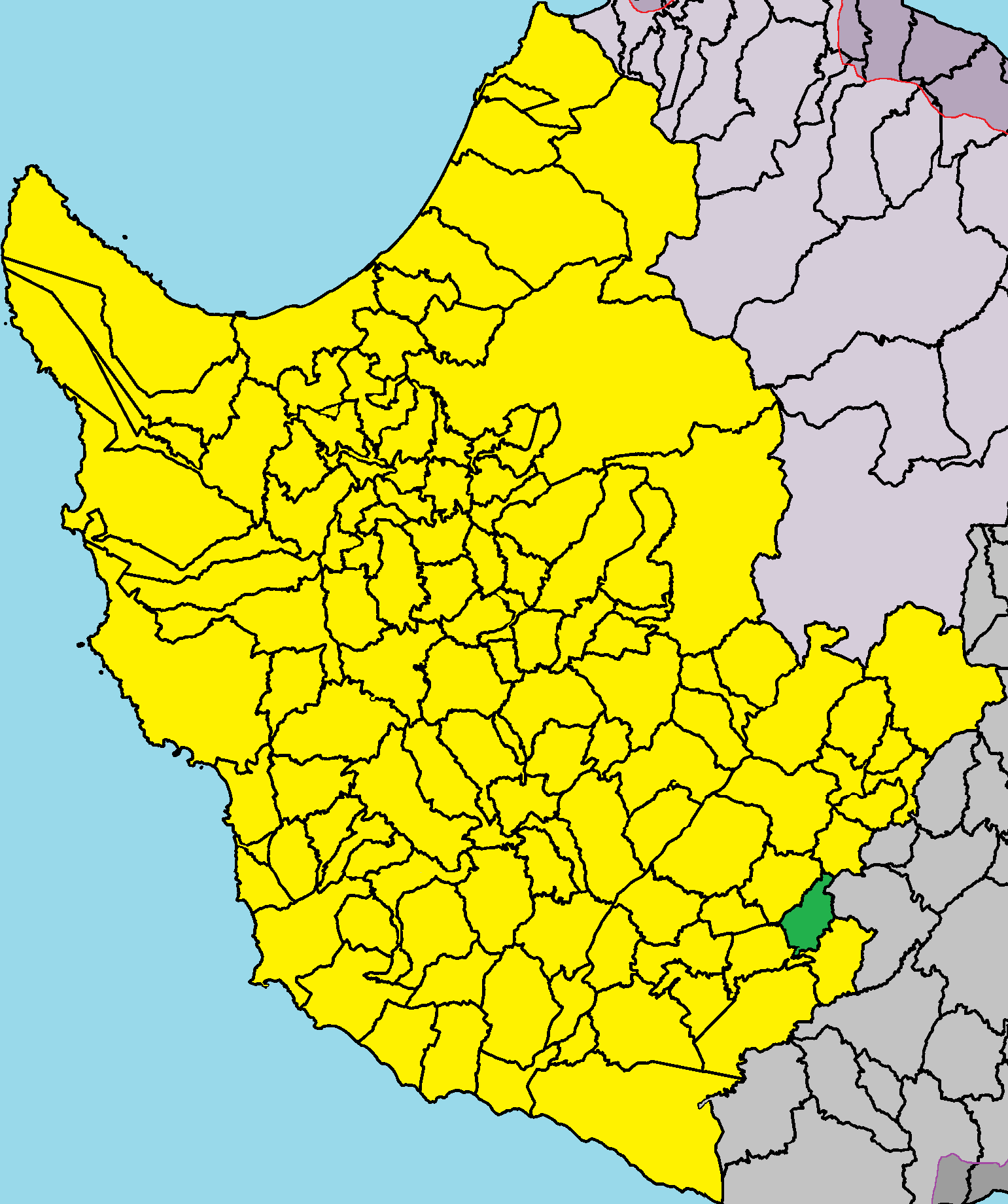
Prastio, in Paphos District, Cyprus

Prastio (Greek: Πραστειό, Turkish: Yuvalı) is an abandoned Turkish Cypriot village located in the Paphos District of Cyprus, on the Diarizos river northeast of Paphos.
