= Istinjon, Cyprus =

Istinjon Ιστιντζιόν Tabanlı
- Location in Cyprus
- Coordinates: 34°58′30″N 32°31′38″E
- Country: Cyprus
- District: Paphos District

Population (2001)
  - Total: 0
- Time zone: UTC+2 (EET)
  - Summer (DST): UTC+3 (EEST)
- Postal code: 6316

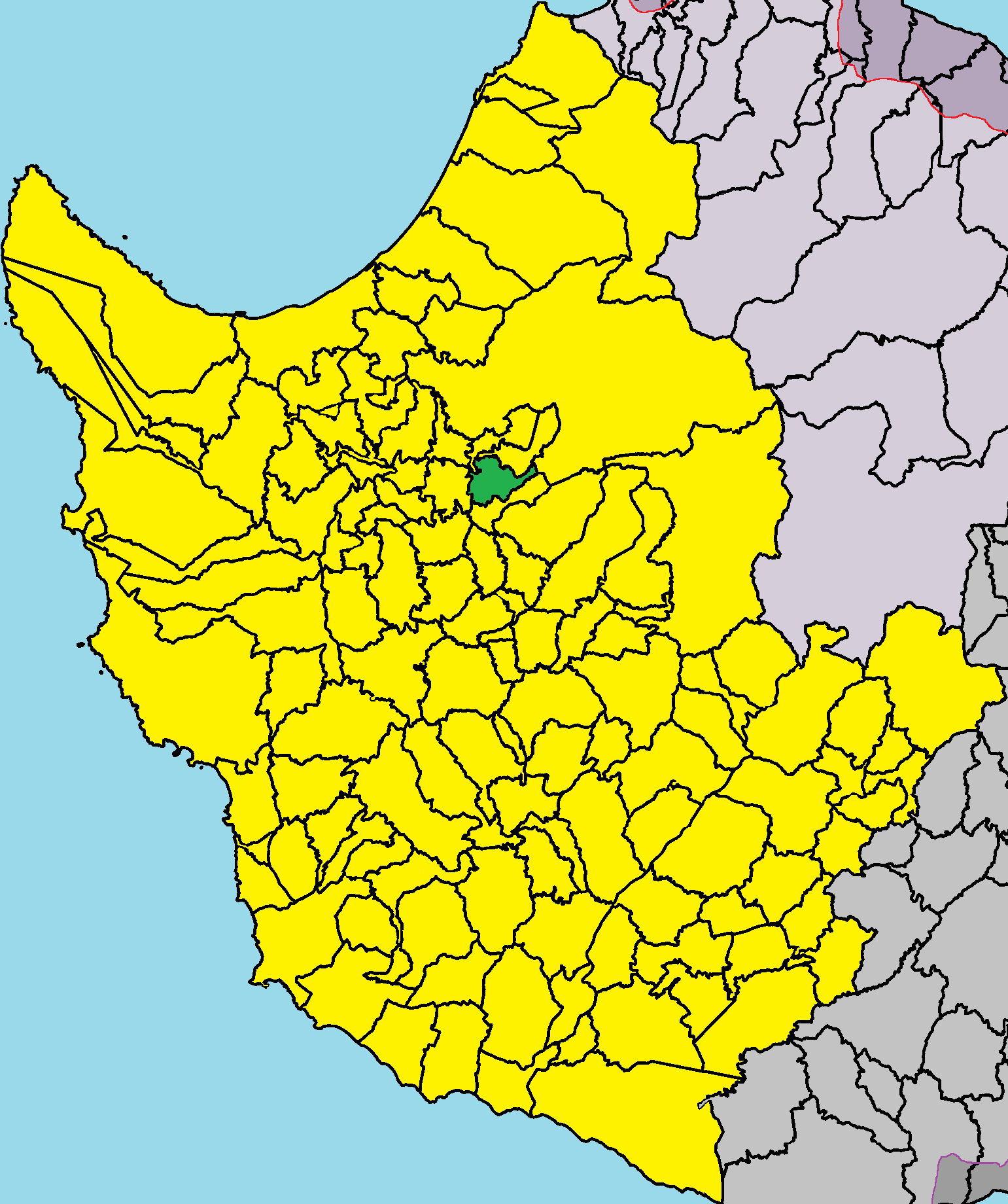
Istinjon in Paphos District.

Istinjon (Greek: Κιός, Turkish: Tabanlı) is a deserted Turkish Cypriot village in the Paphos District of Cyprus, located 5 km south of Lysos. Most of its inhabitants fled during an attack and siege by Greek Cypriot forces that began on 25 July 1974. The village remains a ghost village in ruins.
