= Mesana =

Mesana Μέσανα
- Location in Cyprus
- Coordinates: 34°50′56″N 32°42′24″E
- Country: Cyprus
- District: Paphos District

Population (2001)
  - Total: 50
- Time zone: UTC+2 (EET)
  - Summer (DST): UTC+3 (EEST)
- Postal code: 6214

Mesana (Greek: Μέσανα) is a village in the Paphos District of Cyprus, located 2 km northeast of Salamiou.

== Location ==
Built northeast of the city of Pafos is the village of Mesana.

== History and name ==
The village, according to the Great Cyprus Encyclopaedia, was built after the medieval times and this is concluded by the absence of the village on maps of that period.

The name of the village is linked to its geographical position. The toponym “Mes ‘iana” means 'in the middle' or 'between' in Greek, and refers to the location between the villages of Salamiou and Arminou.

== Population ==
From the end of the 19th century until approximately the middle of the 20th century, according to the census documents, the population of Mesana showed a constant increase. However, from then on the number of residents began to decline. In particular, from 1881 until 1946, the population of the village rose from 129 to 313, but from 1946 till 2017, the number of residents declined to about 10% of this.

== Vine or Wine Village (Ampelochori or Krasochori) ==
Mesana falls within the geographical region of the vine villages (ampelochoria). It is indicative that in 1985, one hundred and thirty four hectares of land were covered with vines. At the same time, Mesana is one of the 24 Wine villages of Paphos which produced local wine.

== Tourism ==
There are several ecclesiastical monuments in the village, such as the church of Agios Tychikos, the Monastery of Agios Georgios Komanon, as well as two chapels, one dedicated to Agia Eirini and the second to Agios Georgios. Additionally, visitors can see the village's age-long oak trees, Apostolic olive trees, the rivers “Diarizos” and “Lialionas”, as well as the view from the excursion site “Pernera” which is located on the south edge of the village.
