= Kannaviou =

Kannaviou Κανναβιού
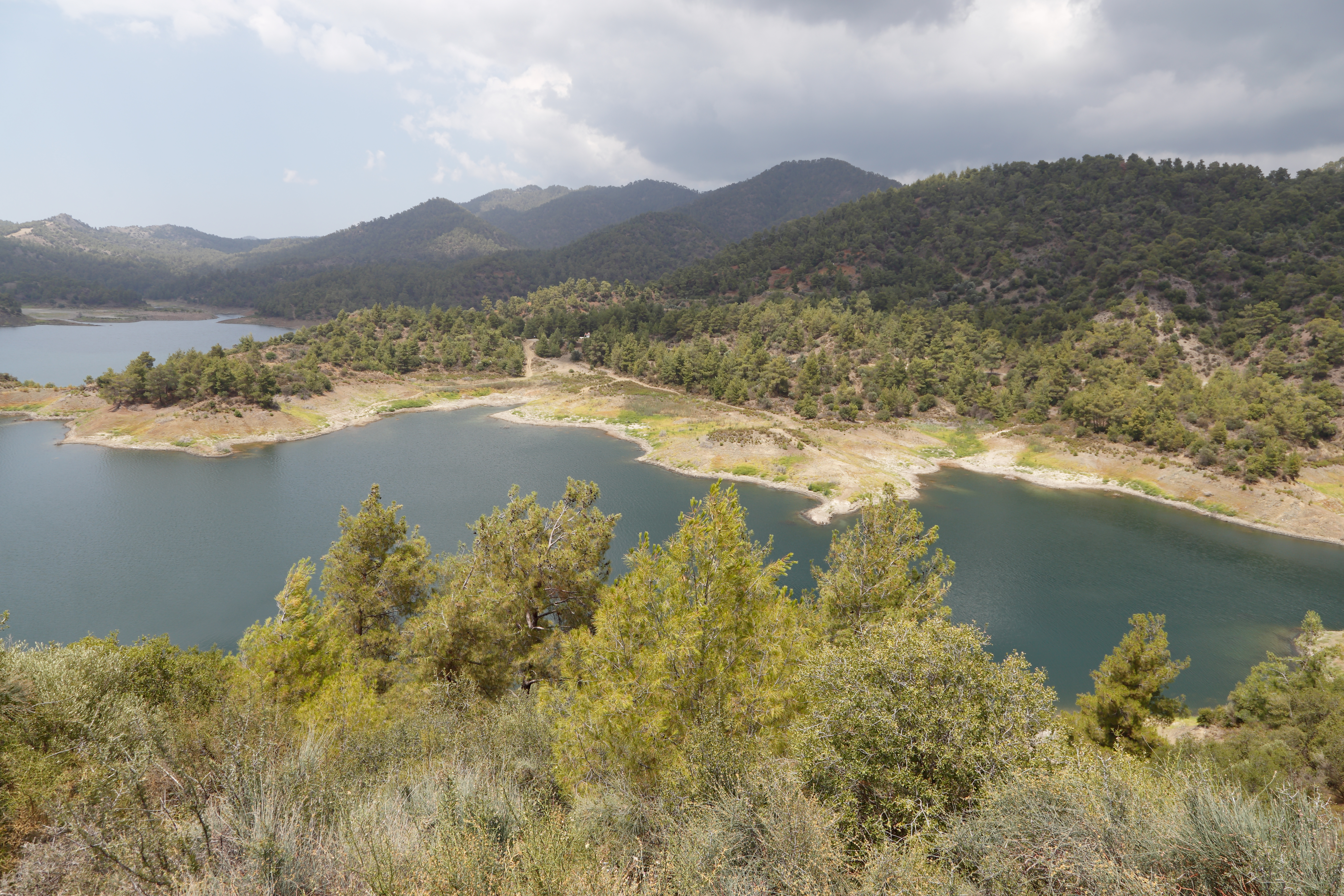
- Kannaviou Reservoir

- Location in Cyprus
- Coordinates: 34°54′52″N 32°34′23″E
- Country: Cyprus
- District: Paphos District

Population (2001)
  - Total: 162
- Time zone: UTC+2 (EET)
  - Summer (DST): UTC+3 (EEST)
- Postal code: 6302

Kannaviou (Greek: Κανναβιού) is a village in the Paphos District of Cyprus, located 9 km west of Pano Panagia.
