= Makounta =

Makounta Μακούντα Magunda/Yakacık
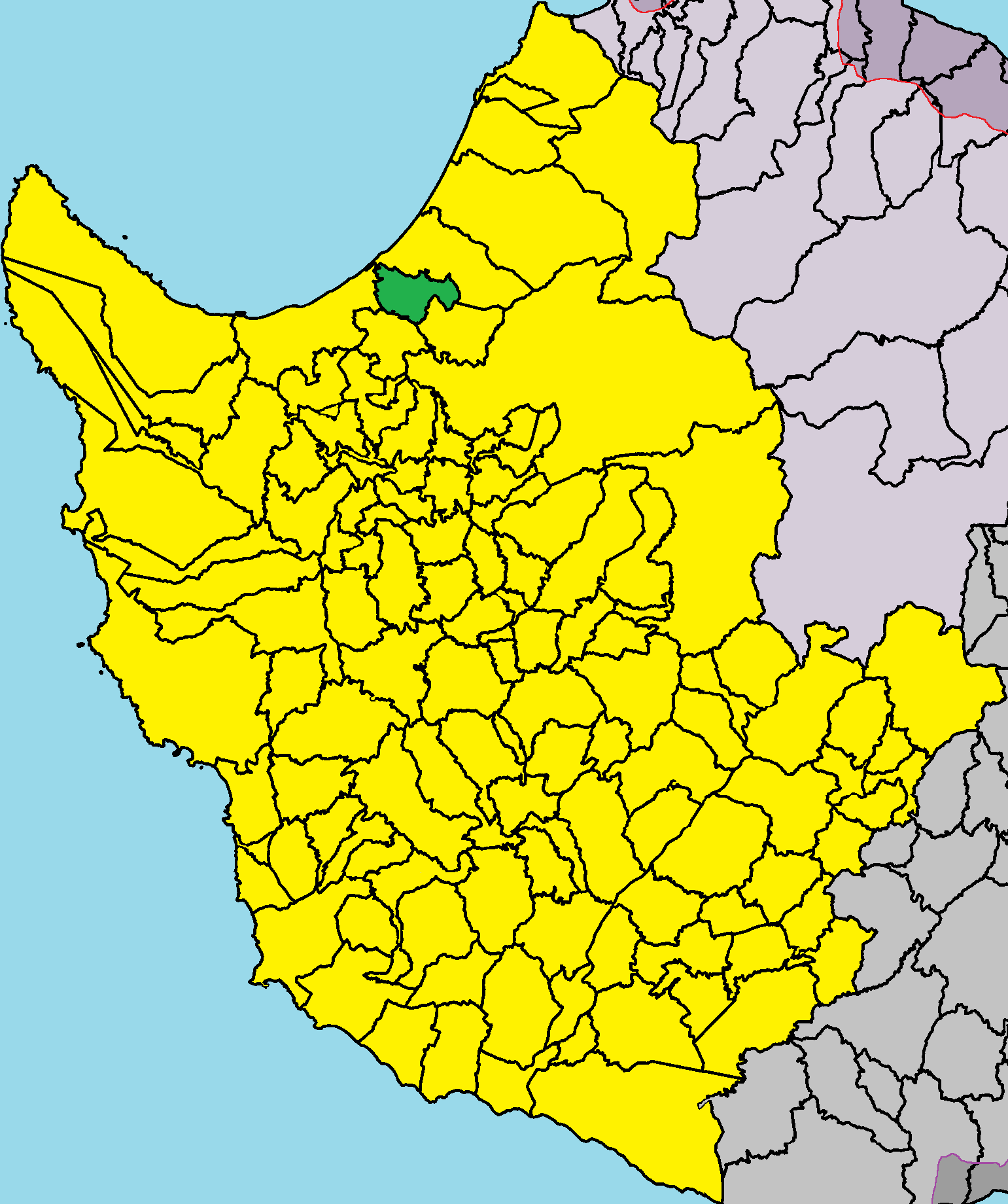

- Location in Cyprus
- Coordinates: 35°3′2″N 32°29′9″E
- Country: Cyprus
- District: Paphos District
- Elevation: 87 m (285 ft)

Population (2001)
  - Total: 66
- Time zone: UTC+2 (EET)
  - Summer (DST): UTC+3 (EEST)
- Postal code: 6362

Makounta (Greek: Μακούντα, Turkish: Magunda/Yakacık) is a village in the Paphos District of Cyprus, located 2 km south of Argaka. Overlooking the bay of Polis Chrysochous, Makounda is adjacent to Argaka (2 km southwest), and nearby there is also a motocross track. Makounta is located 87 m above sea level.

Makounta was a predominantly Turkish Cypriot village from the Ottoman period. Throughout the British period the village’s population increased steadily from 88 in 1891 to 196 in 1960. After 1974 and division of the island, all the villagers of Makounta/Yakacık fled to the north. After the departure of the Turkish Cypriots, the village was used for the settlement of some displaced Greek Cypriots from the island’s north. ”

== Naming ==
Makounta is a village located four kilometers inland from Chrysochou bay and three kilometers north of Pelathousa. Goodwin claims that Makounta means “mushrooms” in ancient Greek. Turkish Cypriots adopted the alternative name Yakacık in 1958. Yaka means “collar,” “bank,” “edge” or “shore.”
