= Livadi, Paphos =

Livadi Λιβάδι
- Location in Cyprus
- Coordinates: 35°06′07″N 32°35′38″E
- Country: Cyprus
- District: Paphos District

Population (2011)
  - Total: 0
- Time zone: UTC+2 (EET)
  - Summer (DST): UTC+3 (EEST)

Livadi (Greek: Λιβάδι) is an abandoned village in the Paphos District of Cyprus.
