= Zacharia, Cyprus =

Zacharia Ζαχαριά
- Location in Cyprus
- Coordinates: 34°58′55″N 32°31′55″E
- Country: Cyprus
- District: Paphos District

Population (2001)
  - Total: 0
- Time zone: UTC+2 (EET)
  - Summer (DST): UTC+3 (EEST)
- Postal code: 6317

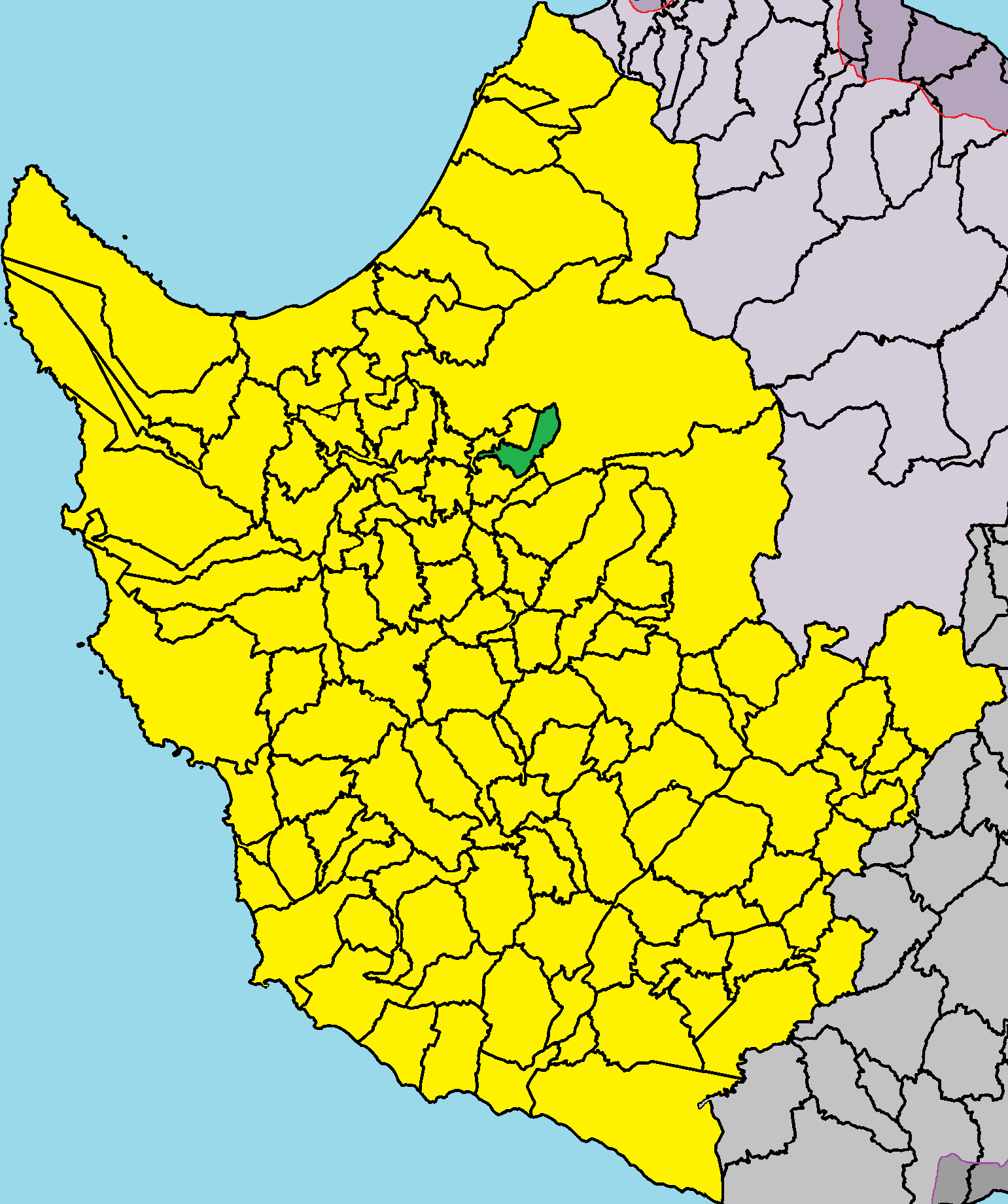

Zacharia (Greek: Ζαχαριά, Turkish: Tatlıca) is an abandoned Turkish Cypriot village in the Paphos District of Cyprus, located 4 km south of Lysos.
