= Choletria =

Choletria Χολέτρια
- Location in Cyprus
- Coordinates: 34°45′45″N 32°35′59″E
- Country: Cyprus
- District: Paphos District

Population (2001)
  - Total: 204
- Time zone: UTC+2 (EET)
  - Summer (DST): UTC+3 (EEST)
- Postal code: 8526

Choletria (Greek: Χολέτρια) is a village in the Paphos District of Cyprus, located 10 km north of Kouklia.
