= Polemi =

Polemi Πολέμι
- Location in Cyprus
- Coordinates: 34°53′7″N 32°30′35″E
- Country: Cyprus
- District: Paphos District
- Elevation: 450 m (1,480 ft)
- Highest elevation: 504 m (1,654 ft)
- Lowest elevation: 310 m (1,020 ft)

Population (2021)
  - Total: 870
- Time zone: UTC+2 (EET)
  - Summer (DST): UTC+3 (EEST)
- Postal code: 8549

Polemi (Greek: Πολέμι) is a village in the Paphos District of Cyprus.

The village is located within the rolling landscape of the Paphos hills at an altitude of 450 metres (1,480 ft) above sea level.

Polemi lies 4 km north of Letymvou and 3 km east of Stroumbi, off the main B7 Paphos to Polis (Polis Chrysochous) road. The majority of the houses of Polemi stand on a plateau overlooking its associated farmland in the valleys on each side, where its boundaries meet those of neighbouring villages in the lower lying land. The village stands at the point between several watersheds with valleys falling southwest towards Mavrokolympos, north towards Chrysochou Bay and also south east.

Polemi has a mild climate with temperatures generally cooler at all times than in the coastal areas of Paphos. The average annual temperature is 17.3 °C. It receives an average annual rainfall of about 637 millimeters.

== History ==
Polemi has historically been a relatively large village by local standards and this has resulted in the amenities present there today. The village is home to a primary school Δημοτικό Σχολείο Πολεμίου (Demotiko Scholeiou Polemiou) with 84 students, and the local secondary school Γυμνάσιο και Λύκειο Πολεμίου (Gymnasio/ Lykeio Polemiou), serving Polemi and surrounding areas. There are shops, restaurants and several cafes in the village.

The foundation of Polemi and its naming is uncertain. There has most probably been a settlement of Greek speaking people here by this name since the Byzantine era. The name Polemi can be translated as meaning 'warriors' village'; with πόλεμος (polemos) meaning battle in Ancient Greek, πολέμιος (polemios) translating from modern Greek into English as 'adversary' or 'foe', and πολεμικό (polemiko) meaning 'war like'. Some locals believe the name of the village is rooted in the settlement of a division of former soldiers from the Byzantine army in the Middle Ages or previously.

The village is laid out on a network of streets with a mix of older houses built from the local white limestone and newer constructions from the later 20th Century and 21st century. The village was traditionally made up of a series of related hamlets rather than one single village around a core, though it has progressively concentrated around the church of Παναγία Χρυσελεούσα Panagia Chryseleousa (the Virgin Mary of mercy). Another core of older dwellings can be seen close to the chapel of Prophitis Ilias (Prophet Elijah) at Matsima in the west of the plateau. There was another hamlet named Ayios Giorgios (Saint George) in the lower lands to the west of the village. A small chapel of the same name still stands in this area amongst olive groves and has been restored in recent years.

Polemi has a long and rich history of association with the Greek Orthodox Church. As well as the main church and smaller chapels in Polemi, the Metochi Μετόχι stands at the northern edge of the village. This large stone building and enclosed courtyard was built as an outpost of the Kykkos Monastery, the pre-eminent monastic institution of Cyprus. Polemi's association with Kykkos, which is itself located high in the Troodos Mountains, was longstanding. Much of the farmland around the village was under the ownership of the monastery until the twentieth century. This historic ownership may have dated back to the rule of the Frankokratia, the Crusaders or Venetians when a feudal system was introduced on the island; or from the time of the Ottoman Empire in Cyprus when families were subject to onerous taxes and private property was sometimes transferred to recognised religious institutions.

While some villages in the Paphos region were settled by Turkish speaking populations during the Ottoman period, Polemi was historically a village of Greek Cypriots. Today Polemi retains its predominantly Greek character but is home to a mix of nationalities with a number of British people living there as in other villages in the Paphos district.

Polemi is one of the 'wine villages' of Paphos with extensive cultivation of vines in the fields around the village. The SODAP Kamanterena winery is located just outside the village boundary to the south west.

Polemi is also known for its naturally occurring red tulips that bloom in the fields around the village in springtime. An annual tulip festival is celebrated to mark this phenomenon.

== Climate ==
Climate data for Polemi, Cyprus (447 m)
| Month | Jan | Feb | Mar | Apr | May | Jun | Jul | Aug | Sep | Oct | Nov | Dec | Year |
|---|---|---|---|---|---|---|---|---|---|---|---|---|---|
| Mean daily maximum °C (°F) | 14.1 (57.4) | 14.7 (58.5) | 16.4 (61.5) | 20.1 (68.2) | 24.3 (75.7) | 28.8 (83.8) | 31.5 (88.7) | 31.8 (89.2) | 28.8 (83.8) | 24.8 (76.6) | 20.4 (68.7) | 16.2 (61.2) | 22.7 (72.8) |
| Mean daily minimum °C (°F) | 6.0 (42.8) | 5.9 (42.6) | 6.9 (44.4) | 9.3 (48.7) | 12.8 (55.0) | 16.5 (61.7) | 18.6 (65.5) | 19.2 (66.6) | 16.6 (61.9) | 13.7 (56.7) | 10.5 (50.9) | 7.6 (45.7) | 12.0 (53.5) |
| Average precipitation mm (inches) | 175 (6.9) | 75 (3.0) | 47 (1.9) | 15 (0.6) | 6 (0.2) | 0 (0) | 0 (0) | 0 (0) | 15 (0.6) | 46 (1.8) | 83 (3.3) | 175 (6.9) | 637 (25.1) |
| Average relative humidity (%) | 77 | 75 | 70 | 62 | 55 | 49 | 49 | 53 | 56 | 59 | 67 | 76 | 63 |
Source: Cyprus Department of Meteorology

Climate data for Paphos (Kallepia: Moro Nero, Cyprus (290 m)) (1961–2022)
| Month | Jan | Feb | Mar | Apr | May | Jun | Jul | Aug | Sep | Oct | Nov | Dec | Year |
|---|---|---|---|---|---|---|---|---|---|---|---|---|---|
| Average precipitation mm (inches) | 131.3 (5.17) | 95 (3.7) | 67.1 (2.64) | 33 (1.3) | 11 (0.4) | 1.7 (0.07) | 0.8 (0.03) | 0.2 (0.01) | 3.3 (0.13) | 41 (1.6) | 81 (3.2) | 135 (5.3) | 600 (23.6) |
Source: Cyprus Department of Meteorology

Climate data for Paphos (Pitargou, Cyprus (290 m)) (2017–2022)
| Month | Jan | Feb | Mar | Apr | May | Jun | Jul | Aug | Sep | Oct | Nov | Dec | Year |
|---|---|---|---|---|---|---|---|---|---|---|---|---|---|
| Average precipitation mm (inches) | 119 (4.7) | 82 (3.2) | 80 (3.1) | 56 (2.2) | 19 (0.7) | 23 (0.9) | 1 (0.0) | 4 (0.2) | 16 (0.6) | 46 (1.8) | 61 (2.4) | 109 (4.3) | 616 (24.3) |
Source: Cyprus Department of Meteorology
