= Galataria =

Galataria Γαλαταριά
- Location in Cyprus
- Coordinates: 34°52′38″N 32°37′54″E
- Country: Cyprus
- District: Paphos District

Population (2001)
  - Total: 55
- Time zone: UTC+2 (EET)
  - Summer (DST): UTC+3 (EEST)
- Postal code: 6224

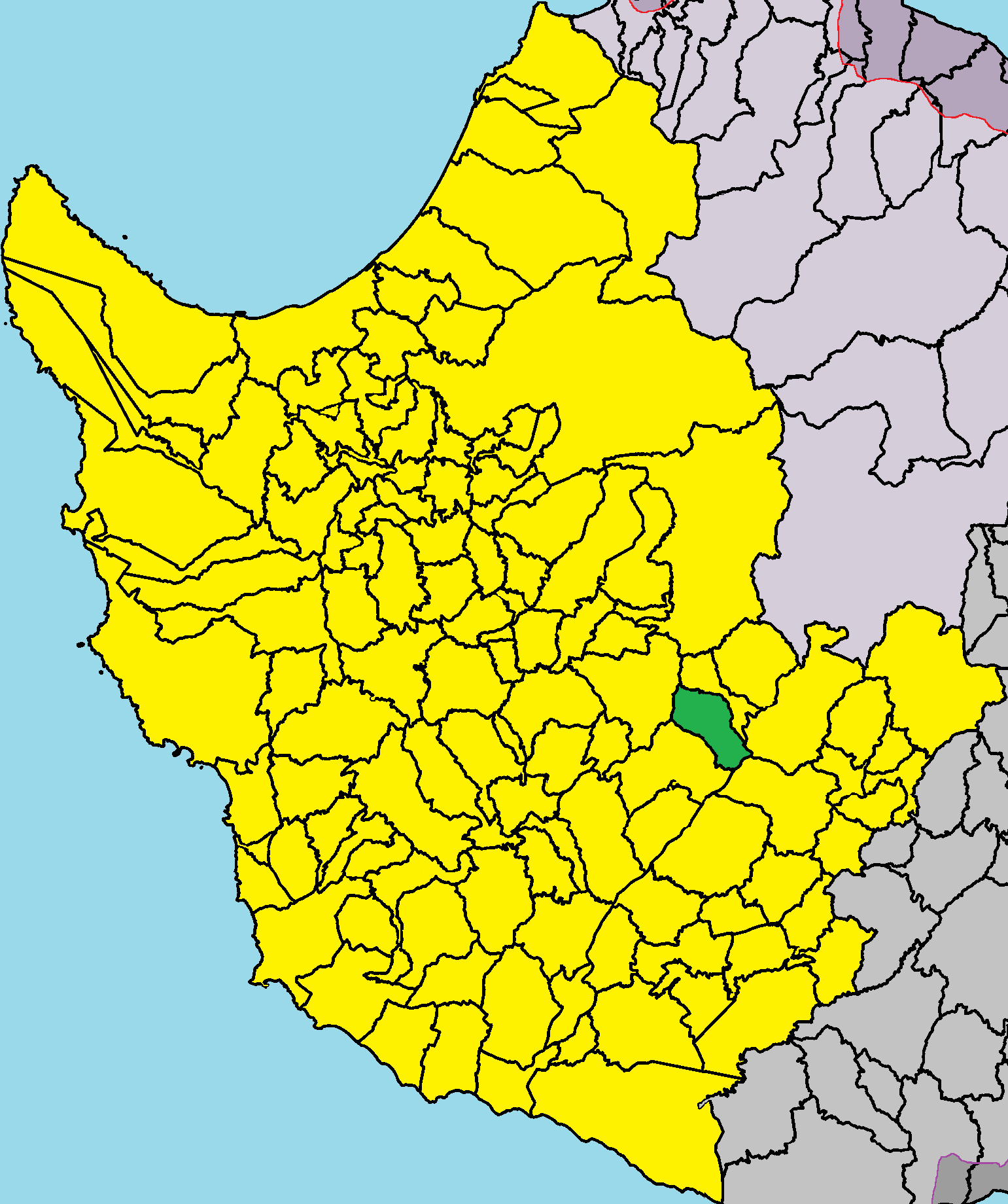
Galataria in Paphos District.

Galataria (Greek: Γαλαταριά and Turkish: Yoğurtçular) is a village in the Paphos District of Cyprus, located 3 km east of Ayios Photios.
