= Sarama, Cyprus =

Sarama Σαραμά
- Location in Cyprus
- Coordinates: 34°57′20″N 32°31′43″E
- Country: Cyprus
- District: Paphos District

Population (2001)
  - Total: 0
- Time zone: UTC+2 (EET)
  - Summer (DST): UTC+3 (EEST)
- Postal code: 6312

Sarama (Greek: Σαραμά) is a deserted Turkish Cypriot village in the Paphos District of Cyprus, located 7 km south of Lysos. The village was devastated by an earthquake, which appears to be the reason it was deserted, although an insect destructive to the corn crop was reported to be affecting farmers of the village in 1879. Thermal springs in the vicinity indicate powerful hydrothermal activity.

Nearby is the north bank of the Stavros tis Psokas River, the largest river of the region, a river which flows through a valley near the foothills of the Paphos Forest. There is said to be a "dizzy drop of 1500 feet to the bottom of the Sarama canyon", in this Paphos Plateau region of western Cyprus. An Anthemion stele unearthed in Sarama is on display in the Paphos Museum and numerous stone tools have been unearthed in the area.
