= Agios Isidoros, Cyprus =

Agios Isidoros 'Αγιος Ισίδωρος
- Location in Cyprus
- Coordinates: 35°0′19″N 32°28′16″E
- Country: Cyprus
- District: Paphos District

Population (2001)
  - Total: 10
- Time zone: UTC+2 (EET)
  - Summer (DST): UTC+3 (EEST)
- Postal code: 6369

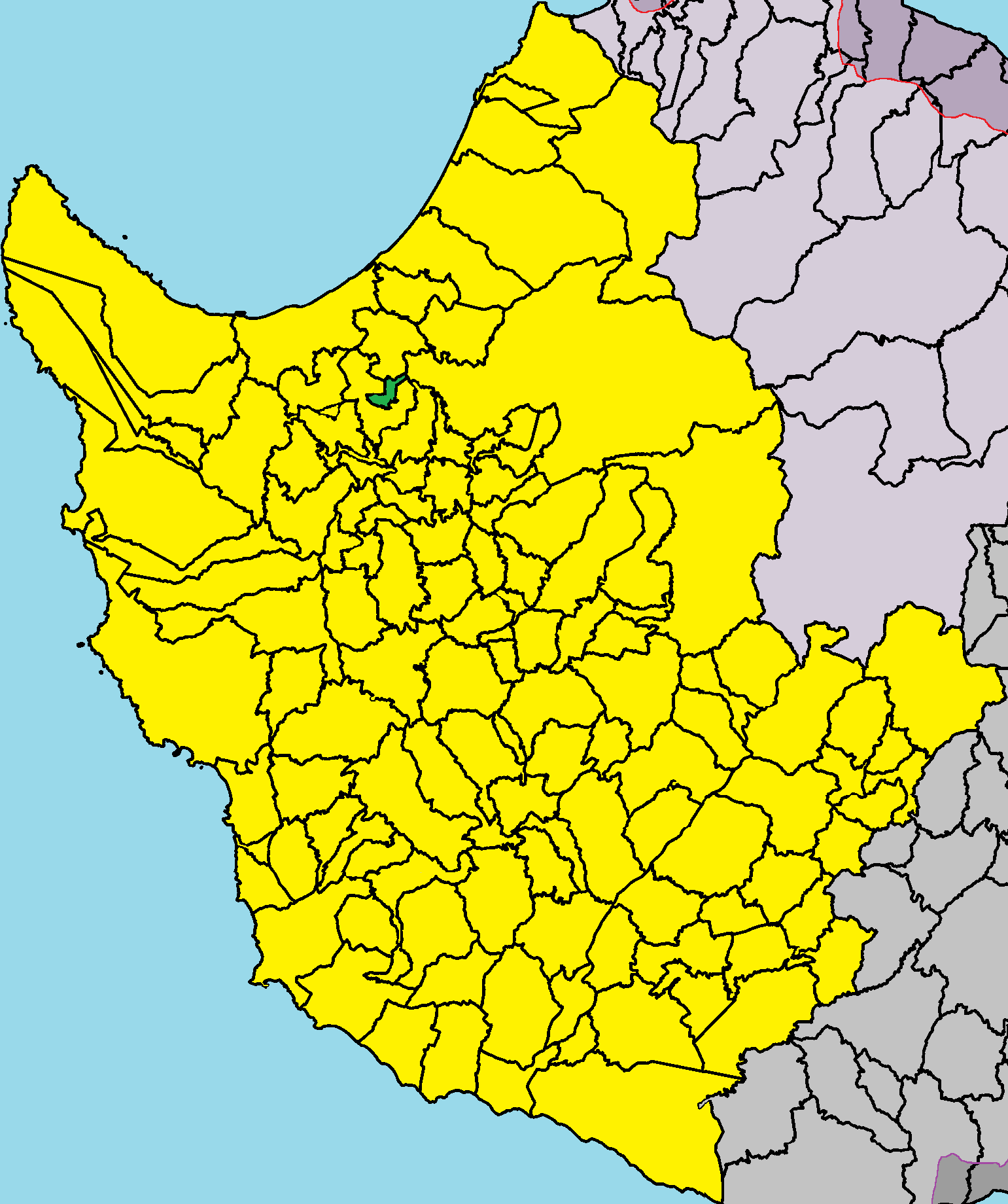
Agios Isidoros in Paphos District

Agios Isidoros (Greek: 'Αγιος Ισίδωρος) is a village in the Paphos District of Cyprus, located 6 km southeast of Polis Chrysochous.
