= Argaka =

Argaka Αργάκα
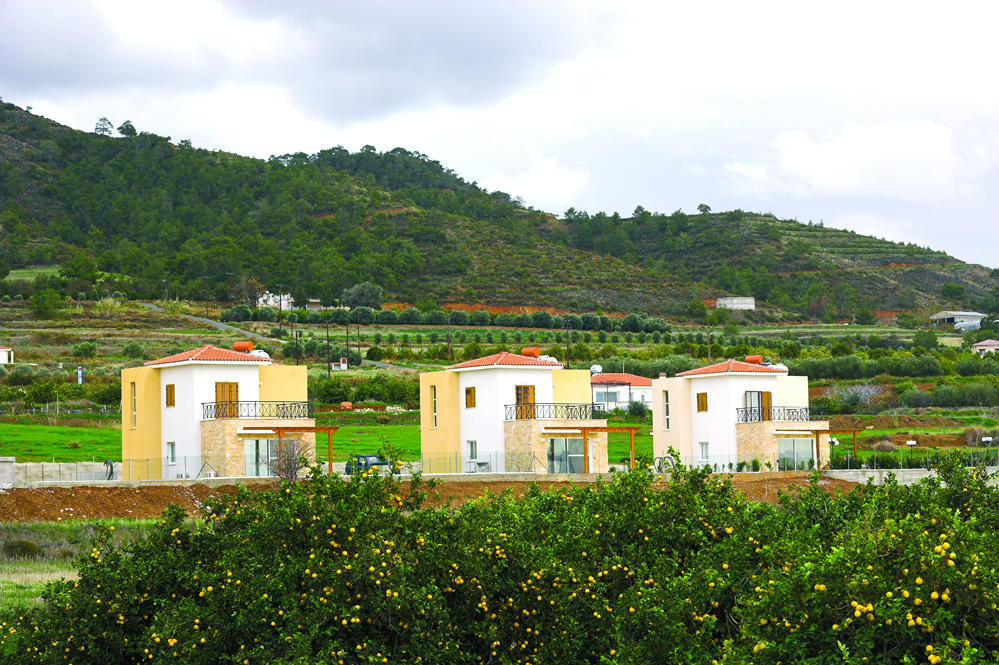

- Location in Cyprus
- Coordinates: 35°3′56″N 32°29′28″E
- Country: Cyprus
- District: Paphos District

Population (2011)
  - Total: 1.078
- Time zone: UTC+2 (EET)
  - Summer (DST): UTC+3 (EEST)
- Postal code: 8873
- Website: http://www.argaka.org/

Argaka (Greek: Αργάκα) is a village in the Paphos District of Cyprus, located 7 km northeast of Polis Chrysochous. From a geological perspective, it is located upon the calcareous sandstones, the sands, and the marls of the Pleistocene period as well as the lavas and the magma rocks (northeast of the settlement). From a morphological aspect, what stand out are the coastal, alluvial plain, one or two marine terraces, and a slope that steadily ascends up to 500 metres. Several streams flow down from the slope toward the sea, indeed with a relatively large one flowing next to the village. The river of Makounta, upon which the Argaka – Makounta dam was constructed, is located southeast of the village.

== Endangered Turtle Nesting Sites ==
There are many nesting areas throughout Argaka where protected endangered Loggerhead (Caretta Caretta) and Green turtles (Chelonia mydas) visit. This runs from Limni through to Gialia. The mayor of Argaka, Spyros Pelopidas, works closely with the government protection team in protecting the turtle species, although there are tourist areas along the beach, rules are in place throughout the summer to ensure nests are kept protected. Some members of the village help to carry out beach clean ups and contribute to turtle conservation in the area.

== Topography ==
Argaka is situated 96 metres above sea level.

== Nearby Locations ==
Polis Chrysochous 8 km
