= Agios Georgios, Paphos =

Agios Georgios
- Village
- Location in Cyprus
- Coordinates: 34°46′41″N 32°39′4″E
- Country: Cyprus
- District: Paphos District

Population (2001)
  - Total: 118
- Time zone: UTC+2 (EET)
  - Summer (DST): UTC+3 (EEST)

Agios Georgios (Greek: Άγιος Γεώργιος) is a village located in the Paphos District of Cyprus.
