= Kidasi =

Kidasi Κιδάσι
- Location in Cyprus
- Coordinates: 34°48′26″N 32°42′47″E
- Country: Cyprus
- District: Paphos District

Population (2001)
  - Total: 7
- Time zone: UTC+2 (EET)
  - Summer (DST): UTC+3 (EEST)
- Postal code: 6212

Kidasi (Greek: Κιδάσι) is a village in the Paphos District of Cyprus, located 4 km northeast of Trakhypedhoula.
