= Amargeti =

Amargeti Αμαργέτη
- Location in Cyprus
- Coordinates: 34°49′25″N 32°34′57″E
- Country: Cyprus
- District: Paphos District
- Elevation: 391 m (1,283 ft)

Population (2001)
  - Total: 171
- Time zone: UTC+2 (EET)
  - Summer (DST): UTC+3 (EEST)
- Postal code: 6220

Amargeti (Greek: Αμαργέτη) is a village in the Paphos District of Cyprus, located 3 km (2 mi) north of Axylou. Amargeti is located at 391m above sea level and the annual rainfall is about 600 mm.
