= Asprogia =

Asprogia Ασπρογιά
- Location in Cyprus
- Coordinates: 34°55′19″N 32°36′56″E
- Country: Cyprus
- District: Paphos District

Population (2001)
  - Total: 53
- Time zone: UTC+2 (EET)
  - Summer (DST): UTC+3 (EEST)
- Postal code: 6231

Asprogia (Greek: Ασπρογιά) is a village in the Paphos District of Cyprus, located 3 km west of Pano Panagia.
