= Agios Nikolaos, Paphos =

Agios Nikolaos Αγιος Νικόλαος
- Location in Cyprus
- Coordinates: 34°51′39″N 32°45′11″E
- Country: Cyprus
- District: Paphos District

Population (2001)
  - Total: 74
- Time zone: UTC+2 (EET)
  - Summer (DST): UTC+3 (EEST)
- Postal code: 6218

Agios Nikolaos (Greek: Άγιος Νικόλαος) is a village in the Paphos District of Cyprus, located 3 km north of Praitori.
