= Nea Dimmata =

Nea Dimmata Νέα Δήμματα
- Location in Cyprus
- Coordinates: 35°8′5″N 32°31′21″E
- Country: Cyprus
- District: Paphos District

Population (2001)
  - Total: 70
- Time zone: UTC+2 (EET)
  - Summer (DST): UTC+3 (EEST)
- Postal code: 6366

Nea Dimmata (Greek: Νέα Δήμματα) is a village in the Paphos District of Cyprus, located 14 kilometres (8.7 mi) northeast of Polis Chrysochous.
