= Anarita =

Anarita Αναρίτα
- Location in Cyprus
- Coordinates: 34°44′23″N 32°32′4″E
- Country: Cyprus
- District: Paphos District

Population (2001)
  - Total: 368 (2,001)
- Time zone: UTC+2 (EET)
  - Summer (DST): UTC+3 (EEST)
- Postal code: 6107
- Website: https://www.anarita.org/

Anarita (Greek: Αναρίτα) is a village in the Paphos District of Cyprus, located 3 km (2 mi) northeast of Timi.
