= Trachypedoula =

Trachypedoula Τραχυπέδουλα
- Location in Cyprus
- Coordinates: 34°48′2″N 32°40′42″E
- Country: Cyprus
- District: Paphos District

Population (2001)
  - Total: 82
- Time zone: UTC+2 (EET)
  - Summer (DST): UTC+3 (EEST)
- Postal code: 8608

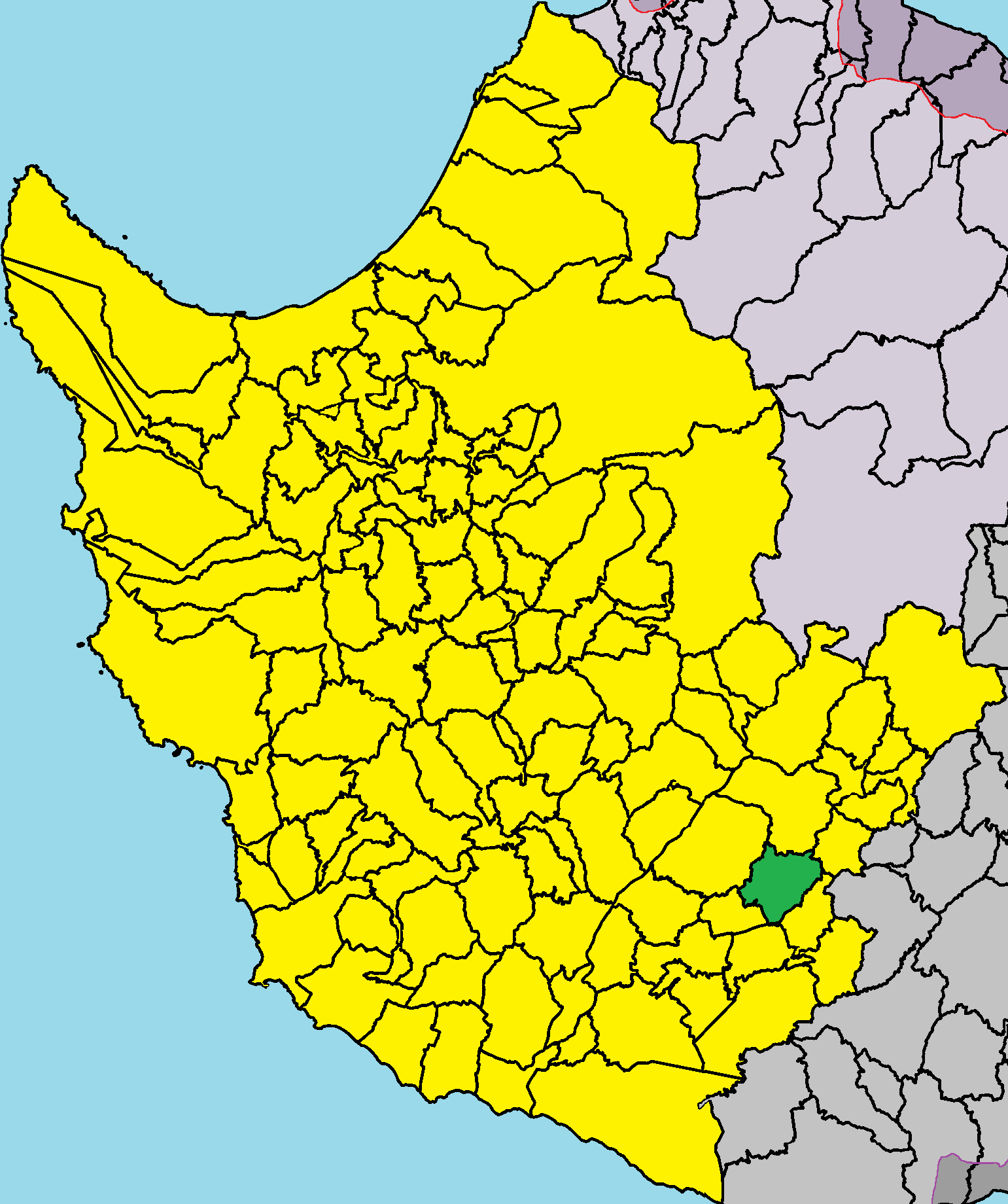
Trachypedoula in Paphos District, Cyprus.

Trachypedoula (Greek: Τραχυπέδουλα) is a village in the Paphos District of Cyprus, located 5 km south of Salamiou.
