= Axylou =

Axylou Αξύλου Aksulu
- Location in Cyprus
- Coordinates: 34°48′21″N 32°33′52″E
- Country: Cyprus
- District: Paphos District

Population (2001)
  - Total: 46
- Time zone: UTC+2 (EET)
  - Summer (DST): UTC+3 (EEST)
- Postal code: 6115

Axylou (Greek: Αξύλου, Turkish: Aksulu) is a village in the Paphos District of Cyprus, located 12 north of Acheleia.
