= Praitori =

Praitori Πραιτώρι
- Location in Cyprus
- Coordinates: 34°50′55″N 32°44′43″E
- Country: Cyprus
- District: Paphos District

Population (2001)
  - Total: 50
- Time zone: UTC+2 (EET)
  - Summer (DST): UTC+3 (EEST)
- Postal code: 6214

Praitori, also Pretori (Greek: Πραιτώρι) is a village in the Paphos District of Cyprus, located 2 km north of Kedares.
