= Paphos District =

District of Cyprus

Coordinates: 34°50′N 32°35′E

Paphos District Επαρχία Πάφου (Greek) Baf kazası (Turkish)
- District
- Location of the district in Cyprus (in red)
- Country: Cyprus
- Capital: Paphos

Area
  - District: 1,389.8 km^{2} (536.6 sq mi)

Population (2021)
  - District: 101,106
  - Rank: 4th
  - Density: 72.749/km^{2} (188.42/sq mi)
  - Urban: 35,961 (2,018)
- Time zone: UTC+2 (EET)
  - Summer (DST): UTC+3 (EEST)
- Post code: 8000-8999
- Area code: +357 26

The Paphos District, (Note: Greek: Επαρχία Πάφου, romanized: Eparchía Páfou Greek pronunciation: [/éparxía páfu/]; Turkish: Baf kazası) or simply Paphos (also Pafos), (Note: /ˈpæfɒs/ PAF-oss; Greek: Πάφος Greek pronunciation: [ˈpafos]; Turkish: Baf) is one of the six districts of Cyprus and it is situated in the western part of Cyprus. Its main town and capital is Paphos. The entire district is controlled by the internationally recognised government of Cyprus. There are four municipalities in Paphos District: Paphos, Yeroskipou, Pegeia, and Polis Chrysochous.

The area of the district is 1,396 km^{2}, which constitutes the 15.1% of the total area of the island, and the population as of 2021 was 101,106. Its coastal area is characterised by gulfs and coves, capes and points, beaches and tiny isles. The district can be divided into three morphological regions: the coastal plain, lying mainly below 200 metres, the hilly area extending from plain up to the igneous rocks of Paphos forest and the mountainous region, lying mainly on the igneous rocks of the Paphos forest. North-west of the District is the Akamas peninsula which contains a national park where the green sea turtle is a protected animal.

== Settlements ==
According to Statistical Codes of Municipalities, Communities and Quarters of Cyprus per the Statistical Service of Cyprus (2015), Paphos District has 4 municipalities and 121 communities. Municipalities are written with bold.

- Acheleia
- Agia Marinouda
- Agia Varvara
- Agios Dimitrianos
- Agios Georgios
- Agios Ioannis
- Agios Isidoros
- Agios Nikolaos
- Akoursos
- Amargeti
- Anadiou
- Anarita
- Androlykou
- Argaka
- Arminou
- Armou
- Asprogia
- Axylou
- Ayia Marina Chrysochous
- Ayia Marina Kelokedharon
- Chloraka
- Choletria
- Choli
- Choulou
- Chrysochou
- Dhrousha
- Drymou
- Eledio
- Empa
- Episkopi
- Evretou
- Faleia
- Fasli
- Fasoula
- Foinikas
- Fyti
- Galataria
- Geroskipou
- Gialia
- Giolou
- Goudi
- Inia
- Istinjon
- Kallepia
- Kannaviou
- Karamoullides
- Kathikas
- Kato Akourdhalia
- Kato Arodes
- Kedares
- Kelokedara
- Kidasi
- Kilinia
- Kinousa
- Kissonerga
- Koili
- Konia
- Kouklia
- Kourtaka
- Kritou Marottou
- Kritou Terra
- Lapithiou
- Lasa
- Lemona
- Lempa
- Letymvou
- Livadi
- Loukrounou
- Lysos
- Makounta
- Mamonia
- Mamountali
- Mandria
- Marathounta
- Maronas
- Meladeia
- Melandra
- Mesa Chorio
- Mesana
- Mesogi
- Milia
- Miliou
- Mousere
- Nata
- Nea Dimmata
- Neo Chorio
- Nikokleia
- Pano Akourdaleia
- Pano Archimandrita
- Pano Arodes
- Pano Panagia
- Paphos
- Pegeia
- Pelathousa
- Pentalia
- Peristerona
- Philousa Kelokedharon
- Philousa Khrysokhous
- Pitargou
- Polemi
- Polis, Cyprus
- Pomos
- Praitori
- Prastio
- Psathi
- Salamiou
- Sarama
- Simou
- Skoulli
- Souskiou
- Statos–Agios Fotios
- Stavrokonnou
- Steni
- Stroumpi
- Tala
- Terra
- Theletra
- Thrinia
- Timi
- Trachypedoula
- Tremithousa
- Trimithousa
- Tsada
- Vretsia
- Zacharia
