= Fasoula (surname) =

Fasoula is a surname. Notable people with the surname include:

- Mariella Fasoula (born 1997), Greek basketball player, daughter of Panagiotis
- Panagiotis Fasoulas (born 1963), Greek politician and basketball player
