= Drinia =

Drinia Δρινια
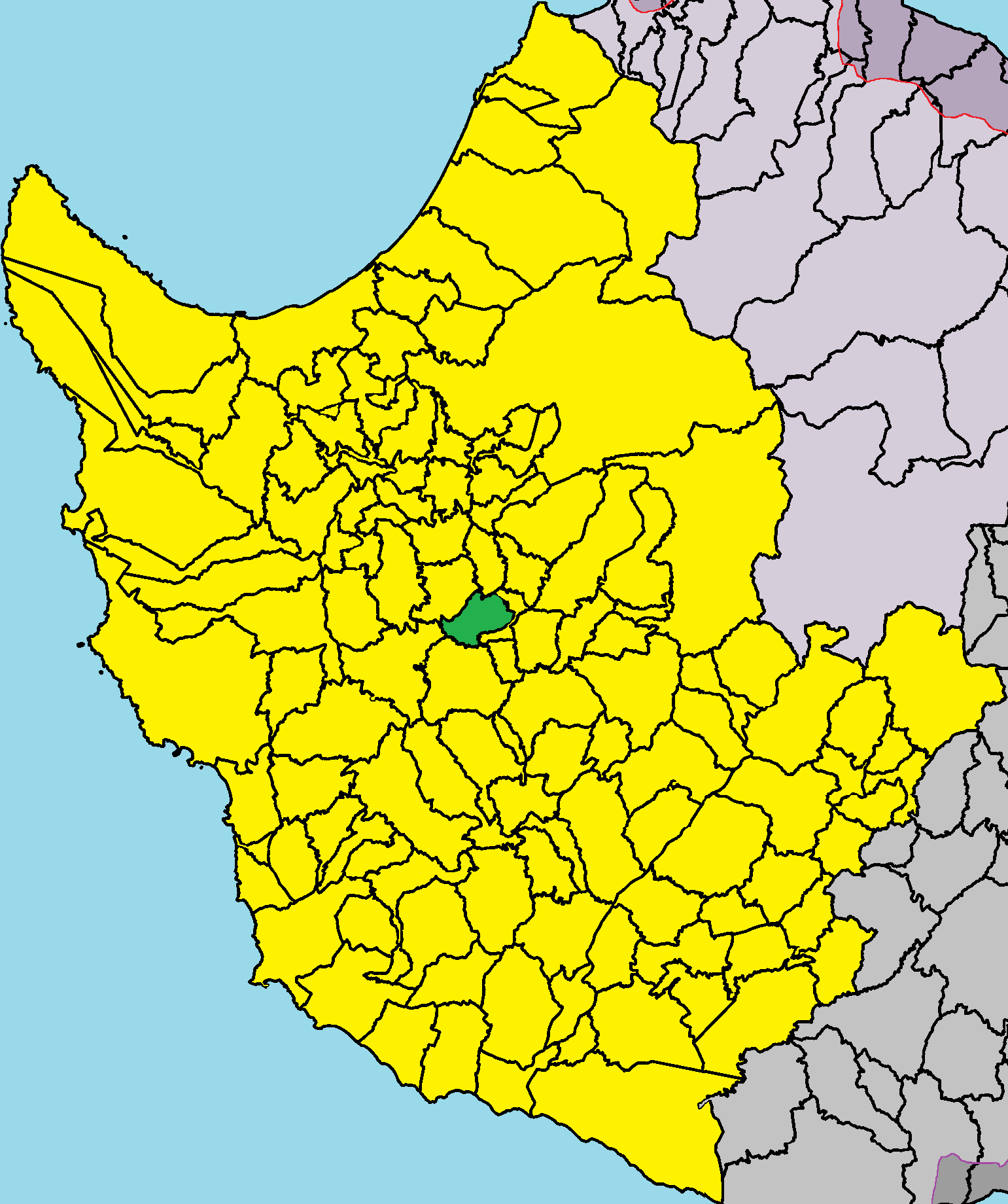

- Location in Cyprus
- Coordinates: 34°54′57″N 32°31′40″E
- Country: Cyprus
- District: Paphos District

Population (2001)
  - Total: 53
- Time zone: UTC+2 (EET)
  - Summer (DST): UTC+3 (EEST)
- Postal code: 6303

Drinia, or sometimes Thrinia (Greek: Δρινια/Θρινια), is a village in the Paphos District of Cyprus, located 3 km north of Agios Dimitrianos. Built at an altitude of 550 meters among vineyards, grain crops, few legumes and almond trees, in a region traversed by many streams, the small settlement with approximately 50 inhabitants belongs to the geographical region of the Limassol-Paphos ampelochoria (wine-producing villages of Cyprus). With its traditional stone houses of folk architecture, vineyards, and wild vegetation, Drinia receives visitors seeking tranquility and relaxation away from the bustling urban centers of Cyprus. One of the last “strongholds” of the preservation of the textile art, Drinia maintains, albeit on a limited scale, the weaving of the well-known phytiotic textiles that took their name from the neighboring village Phyti. The village dates back to medieval times and is referenced by the name “Thrinia”, although some people associate its name with the name of nearby Drymou, believing that it comes from the word “Drymia” (small oak forest).
