= Kedares =

Kedares Κέδαρες
- Location in Cyprus
- Coordinates: 34°50′7″N 32°44′10″E
- Country: Cyprus
- District: Paphos District

Population (2001)
  - Total: 61
- Time zone: UTC+2 (EET)
  - Summer (DST): UTC+3 (EEST)
- Postal code: 6213

Kedares (Greek: Κέδαρες) is a village in the Paphos District of Cyprus, located 6 km north of Kidhasi. It's located 543 m above sea level.

== Topography ==
The village of Kedares in the province of Pafos, is located at the foot of Troodos and at an altitude of 543 meters from the sea. The village of Kedarees is one of the most important vineyards in Cyprus. The main varieties of grapes are black and xylisteri.
