= Kilinia =

Kilinia Kοιλίνια
- Location in Cyprus
- Coordinates: 34°52′59″N 32°37′54″E
- Country: Cyprus
- District: Paphos District

Population (2001)
  - Total: 42
- Time zone: UTC+2 (EET)
  - Summer (DST): UTC+3 (EEST)
- Postal code: 6225

Kilinia (Greek: Kοιλίνια) is a village in the Paphos District of Cyprus, located 2 km east of Statos. Kilinia is inhabited by farmers and the main source of income is agriculture. Most of the inhabitants are more than 50 years old.
