= Kelokedara =

Kelokedara Κελοκέδαρα
- Location in Cyprus
- Coordinates: 34°48′45″N 32°39′3″E
- Country: Cyprus
- District: Paphos District

Population (2001)
  - Total: 227
- Time zone: UTC+2 (EET)
  - Summer (DST): UTC+3 (EEST)
- Postal code: 6210

Kelokedara (Greek: Κελοκέδαρα) is a village in the Paphos District of Cyprus, located 6 km southwest of Salamiou.

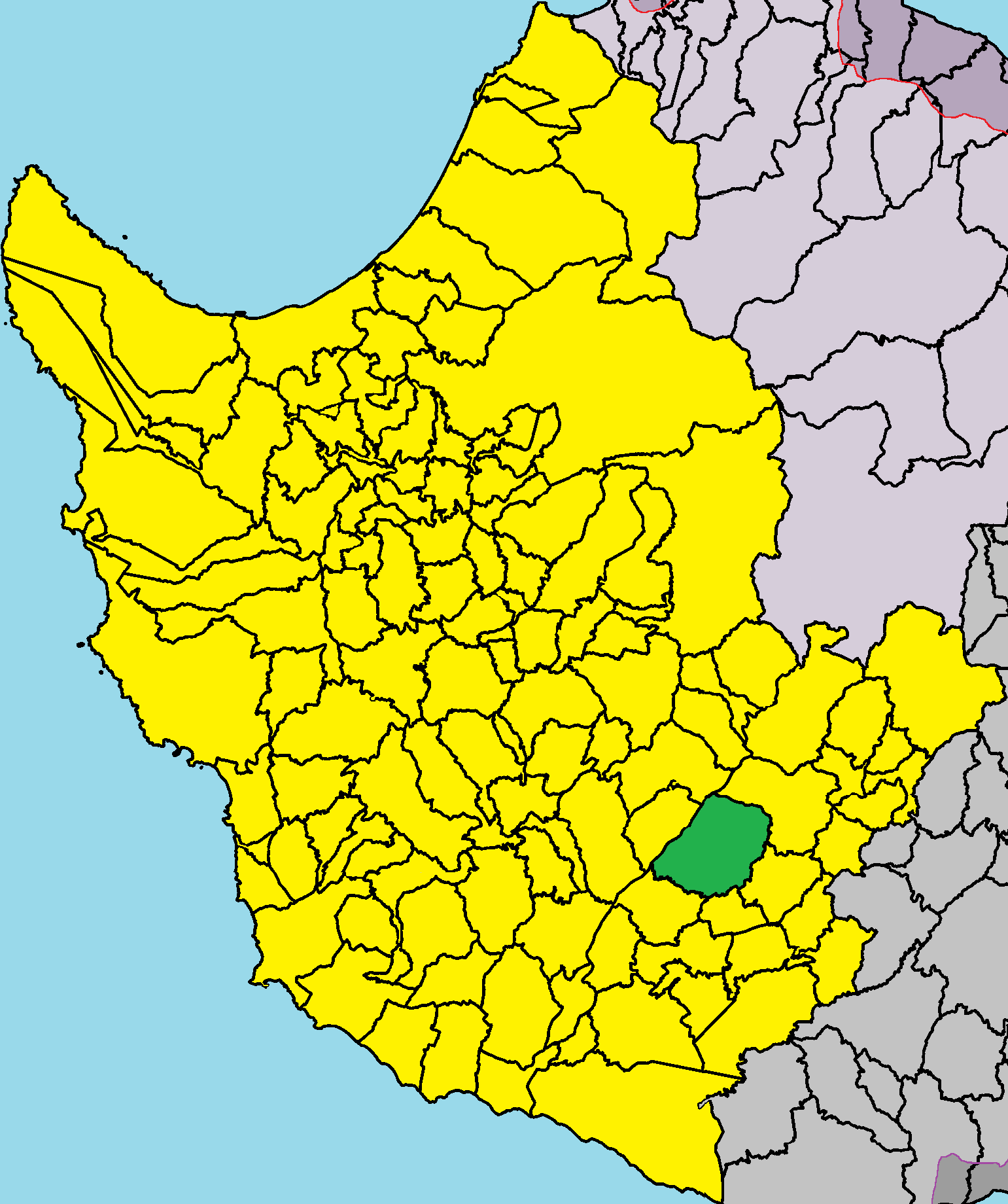
Locating of the village
