= Nikokleia =

Nikokleia Νικόκλεια
- Location in Cyprus
- Coordinates: 34°43′43″N 32°34′27″E
- Country: Cyprus
- District: Paphos District

Population (2001)
  - Total: 105
- Time zone: UTC+2 (EET)
  - Summer (DST): UTC+3 (EEST)
- Postal code: 6102

Nikokleia (Greek: Νικόκλεια) is a village in the Paphos District of Cyprus, located 3 km north of Kouklia.
