= Fasoula, Paphos =

Fasoula Φασούλα
- Village
- Location in Cyprus
- Coordinates: 34°45′42″N 32°37′28″E
- Country: Cyprus
- District: Paphos District

Population (2001)
  - Total: 57
- Time zone: UTC+2 (EET)
  - Summer (DST): UTC+3 (EEST)

Fasoula (Greek: Φασούλα) is a village in the Paphos District of Cyprus, located 10 km north of Kouklia.
