= Acheleia =

Acheleia: Αχέλεια (Greek); Aşelya (Turkish)
- Village and Municipal District
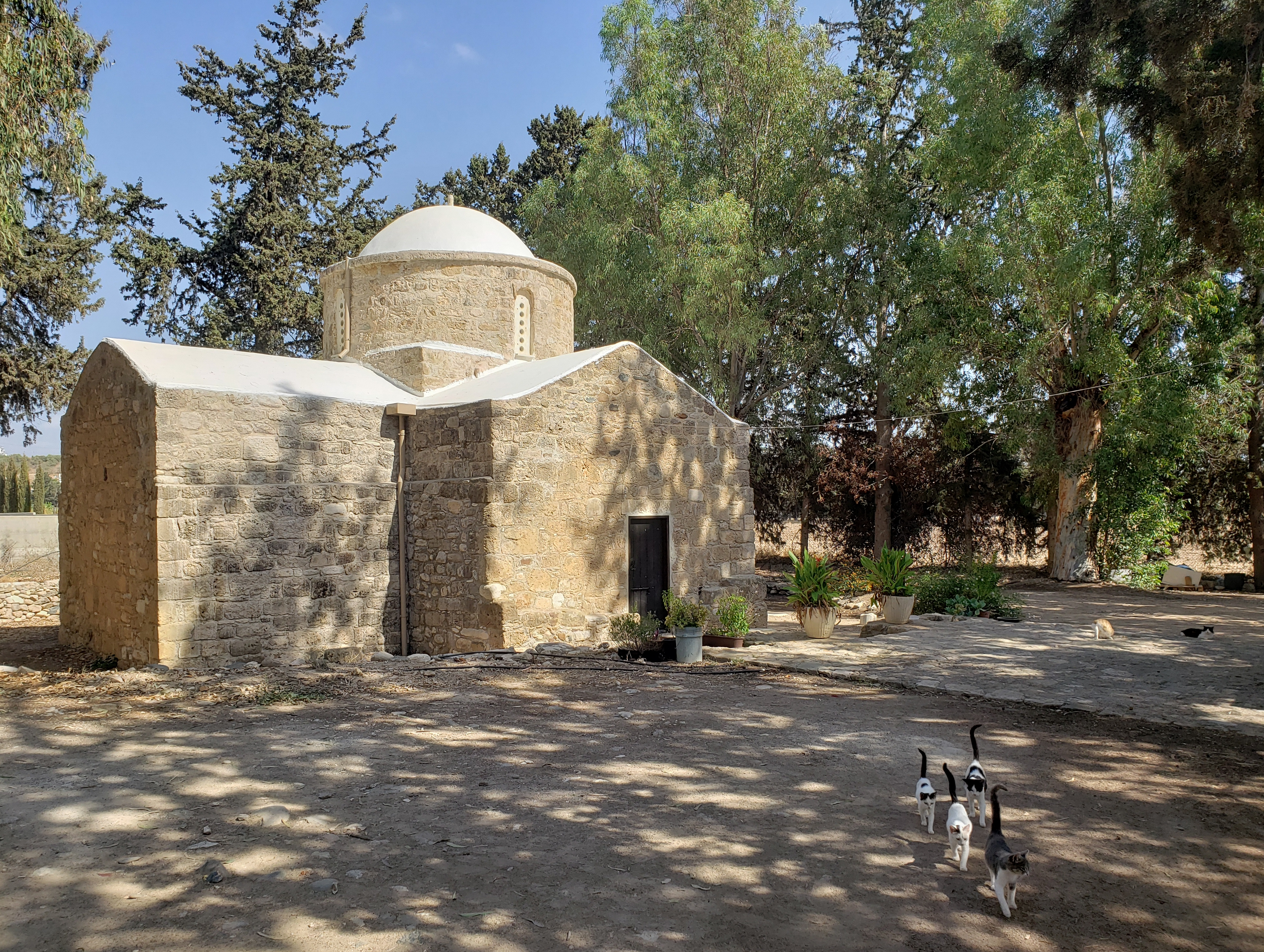

- Location in Cyprus
- Coordinates: 34°44′19″N 32°29′10″E
- Country: Cyprus
- District: Paphos District
- Municipality: Ierokipia Municipality

Population (2001)
  - Total: 113
- Time zone: UTC+2 (EET)
  - Summer (DST): UTC+3 (EEST)
- Postal code: 6014

Acheleia (Greek: Αχέλεια, Turkish: Aşelya) is a village and municipal district of Ierokipia Municipality in the Paphos District of Cyprus, located near to Paphos International Airport. A water canal runs through the village.
