= Pelathousa =

Pelathousa Πελαθούσα
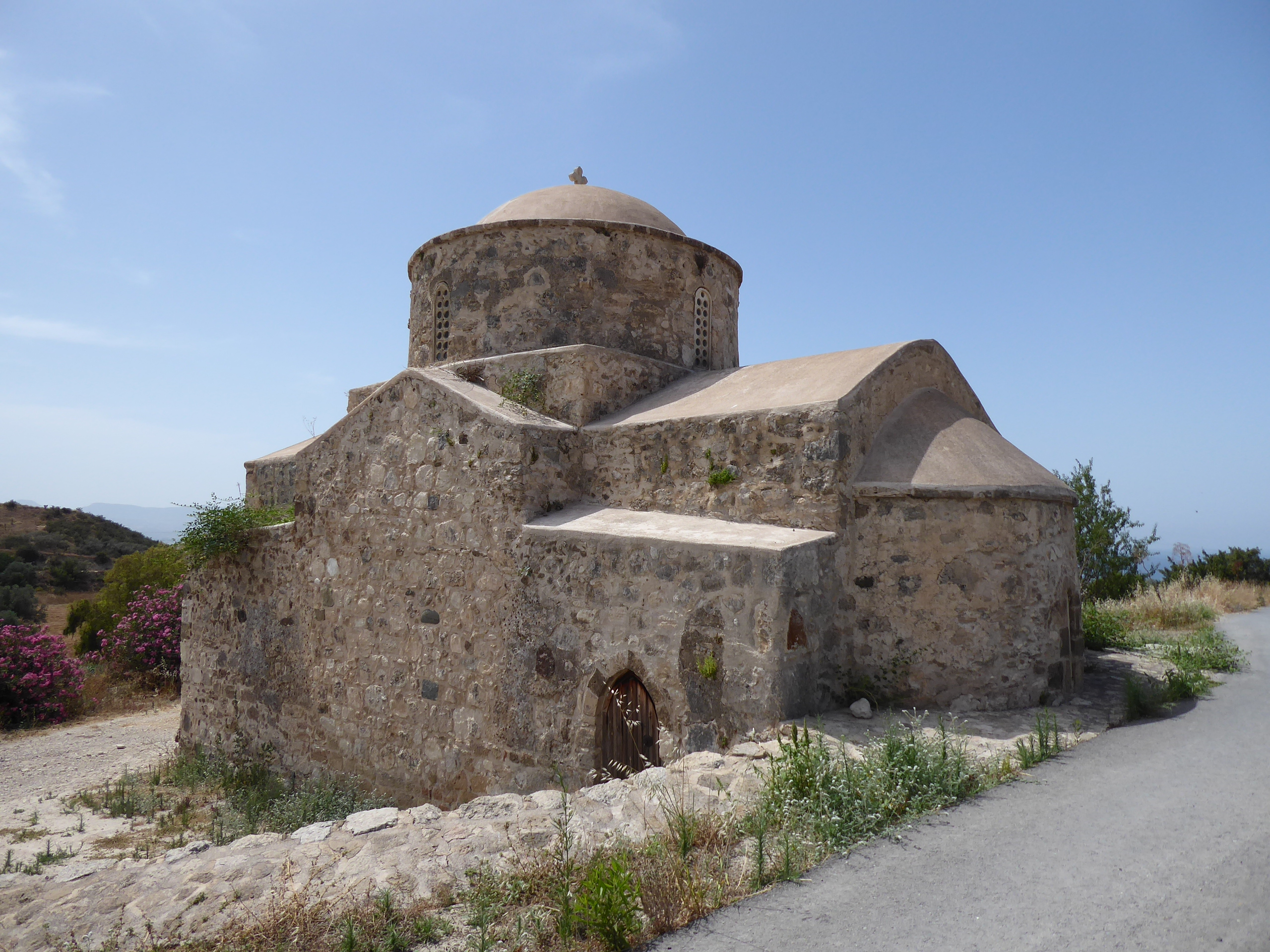
- Church of Panagia Chorteni

- Location in Cyprus
- Coordinates: 35°1′39″N 32°28′31″E
- Country: Cyprus
- District: Paphos District
- Municipality: President of pelathousa municipality;ANDREAS S. SIMOU

Population (2001)
  - Total: 49
- Time zone: UTC+2 (EET)
  - Summer (DST): UTC+3 (EEST)
- Postal code: 8882
- Climate: Csa

Pelathousa (Greek: Πελαθούσα) is a village in the Paphos District of Cyprus, located 5 km east of Polis Chrysochous.
