= Pano Archimandrita =

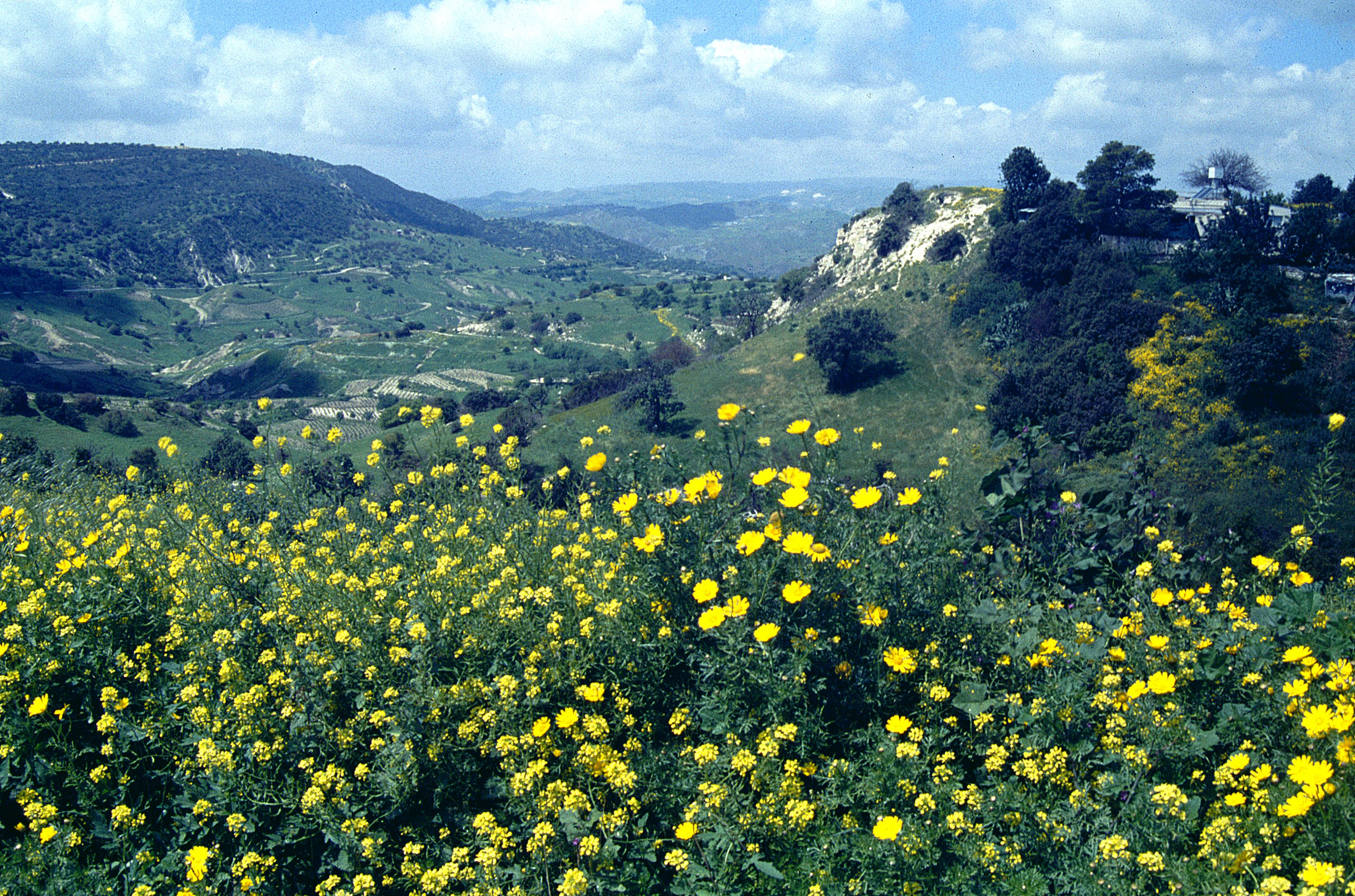

- Location in Cyprus
- Coordinates: 34°45′3″N 32°40′39″E
- Country: Cyprus
- District: Paphos District

Population (2001)
  - Total: 42
- Time zone: UTC+2 (EET)
  - Summer (DST): UTC+3 (EEST)
- Postal code: 6200

Pano Archimandrita (Greek: Πάνω Αρχιμανδρίτα) is a village in the Paphos District of Cyprus, located 12 km northeast of Kouklia.
