= Drymou =

Drymou Δρύμου
- Location in Cyprus
- Coordinates: 34°55′30″N 32°30′48″E
- Country: Cyprus
- District: Paphos District
- Elevation: 1,667 ft (508 m)

Population (2011)
  - Total: 110
- Time zone: UTC+2 (EET)
  - Summer (DST): UTC+3 (EEST)
- Postal code: 6308

Drymou (Greek: Δρύμου) is a village in the Paphos District of Cyprus, located 3 km west of Fyti, with a population of about 100 people at an altitude of 500 meters (1,600 ft). It is between the Troodos mountains and the sea and is surrounded by wild vegetation and grain crops, olive trees, vineyards and almond trees.
