= Morca Cave =

Third-deepest cave in Turkey

- Morca Sinkhole / Morca Doline
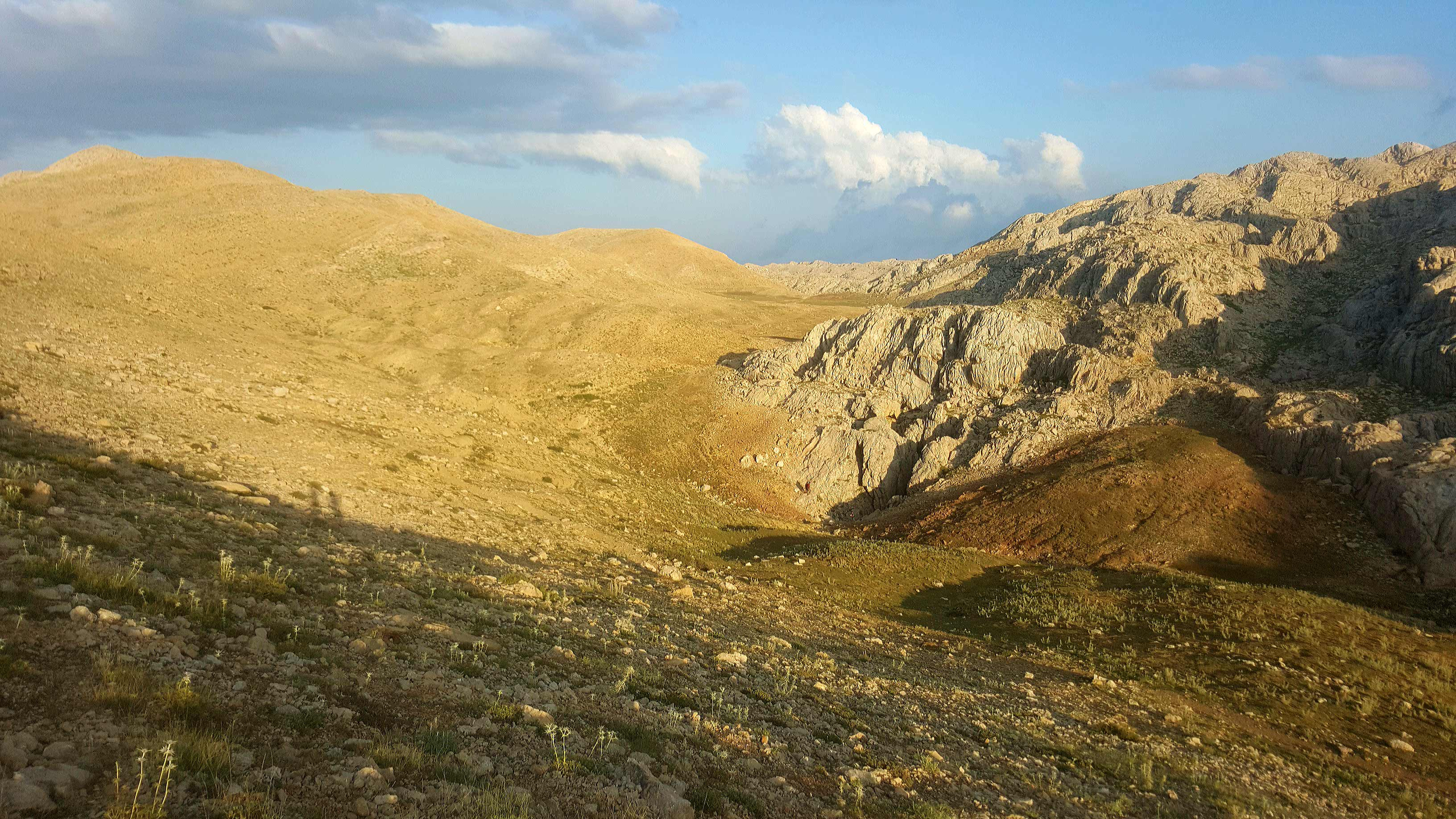
- Doline (sinkhole) with the entrance of Morca Cave on the Taşeli Plateau

- Location within Turkey
- Coordinates: 36°18′34.41″N 32°39′37.12″E
- Depth: 1,276 m
- Length: 5,714 m (18,747 ft)
- Elevation: 1,950 m a.s.l.
- Discovery: 1996
- Entrances: 1

The Morca Cave is located on the Taşeli plateau of the Taurus Mountains in the south of Turkey. Discovered in 1996, it had reached an explored depth of 1,276 meters and a length of 5,714 meters at the end of 2020. By then, Morca was Turkey's third deepest and eighth longest known cave. It has not been fully explored.

== History ==
The Morca doline was discovered in 1996 by a team of Turkish cave explorers from the Aspeg (Anadolu Speleology Group Association) with the guidance of a village leader. In the first exploration in 2013, the team reached a depth of 120 meters, and the following year, they reached 447 meters. In 2018, they reached a depth of 919 meters and a length of almost 3 kilometers.

In August 2019, Turkish, Bulgarian, Lebanese, and US teams jointly conducted a one-month expedition. They reached a depth of -1210 meters, discovered several waterfalls, one of which was 40 meters high, and a large lake. The total length reached was 4068 meters.

In 2020, Ali Hakan Eğilmez dived into the siphon located at a depth of 1259 meters in the main passage but could only advance about ten meters deeper due to insufficient equipment. He observed a multitude of shrimps and concluded, that several watercourses needed further exploration. In the same year, when measuring another side passage, a depth of -1276 meters was reached, and a labyrinthine system of passages was discovered that requires further exploration.

In early September 2023, US cave explorer Mark Dickey fell ill during an expedition with an international team at a depth of -1120 meters. On September 2, a cave rescue operation involving nearly 200 experienced people (cavers, rescuers, and doctors) from eight countries including the European Cave Rescue Association was launched to provide medical care and by September 11 he was evacuated successfully. He suffered from stomach bleeding, received a blood transfusion and was "fed intravenously” all the way out. Dickey gave the Turkish government credit for his rescue because of the prompt delivery of medical supplies he needed.

== Geography and geology ==
The cave is located in the district of Anamur, about 20 kilometers northwest of the city, in the province of Mersin. The Morca cave system develops in the orogenic belt in the southern part of the Taşeli Plateau of the central Taurus Mountains. It is situated on the same plateau as the dolines Çukurpınar Cave and the Egma Sinkhole (also known as Peynirlikönü, the deepest cave in Turkey). At an elevation of about 2120 meters, it presents as a 27 meters deep doline, and transitions into a cave shaft which at the end of 2020 was up to a total depth of 1276 meters and a length of 5192 m.

The cave lies at the contact point of limestones from the Miocene and the Jurassic-Cretaceous. The cave deepened in the vadose zone (unsaturated aquifer above the water table) due to the uplift of the Taşeli Plateau during the late Pliocene-Quaternary period. Besides limestone, the cave also contains clayey limestone and sediments.

The cave shafts and underground galleries are further eroded by water and snowmelt, and also under the chemical action of dissolved CO_{2}. Regular water inflow occurs at depths of 80 meters, 120 meters, 1015 meters, 1030 meters, and 1040 meters. The cave contains an underground river and at least eight side passages, seven of which have different watercourses. As of 2019, investigations regarding a possible karst spring at lower elevation in the area had not yielded results.

== Underground biology ==
In 2019, researchers discovered a species of amphipods in the water of Morca Cave. In 2022, Turkish zoologists Murat Özbek and Gökhan Aydın described it as a new species named Gammarus morcae. These small crustaceans are colorless, eyeless, and slightly over two cm in length. They were identified by stereomicroscopic examination only, without applying molecular biology techniques (DNA sequencing) because they were preserved in water containing formaldehyde.

== See also ==
- List of deepest caves
- Gammaridae
- Niphargidae
