= Kaledran Creek =

River in Mersin Province, Turkey

Kaledran Creek (Turkish: Kaledran çayı) is a short creek in Anamur ilçe (district) of Mersin Province, south Turkey.

The headwaters are in the Taurus Mountains close to Güngören (former Teniste) village. It is a short creek where the birds flight distance between the headwaters and the discharge point is about 15 kilometres (9.3 mi) But unlike other similar creeks around it doesn't dry up in the summer.

In the lower reaches, it draws the border line between Anamur and the Gazipaşa ilçe of Antalya Province. The most important settlement by the river was used to be a village named after the creek. A part of the village was to the west and another part was to the east of the creek. But now the administratively the village is divided. The smaller part in the west is renamed Yakacık, Gazipaşa a village of Antalya Province and the larger part is the Anıtlı, Anamur of Mersin Province. The creek discharges at 36°06′01″N 32°33′46″E to the Mediterranean Sea.

The 5 square kilometres (1.9 sq mi) delta of the creek is a prosperous area. Bananas and citrus are the main crops. Peanut, sesame and corn are among the other products.
