= Cape Anamur =

Point in Turkey

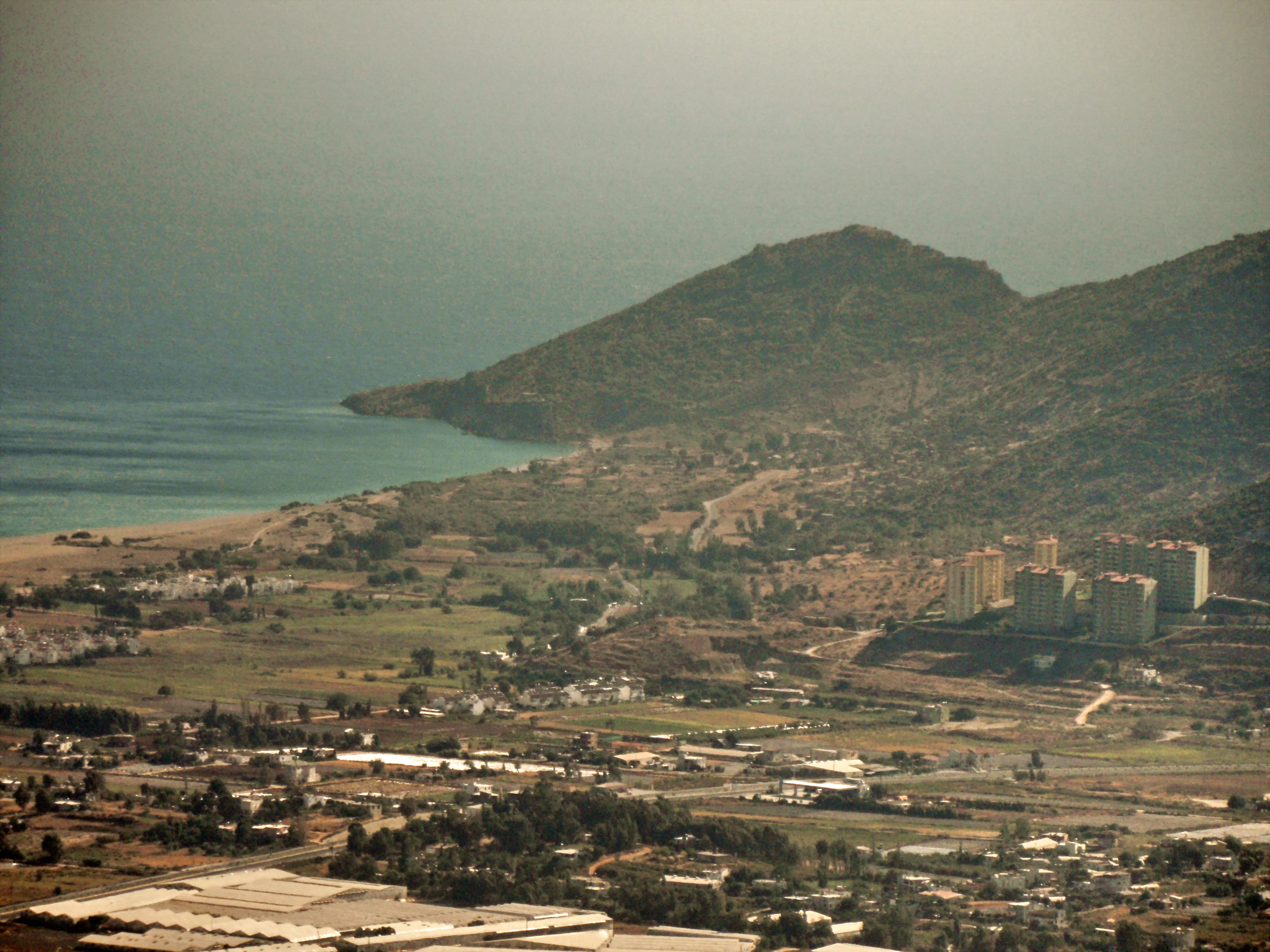

Cape Anamur is a headland on the Mediterranean Sea coast of Mersin Province, Turkey.

Cape Anamur is the southernmost point of Anatolian peninsula at 36°01′17″N 32°48′07″E. The ancient city Anemurium lies on the hills to the north of the cape. The town Ören is to the north and the ilçe (district center) modern Anamur is to the north east. Turkish highway D.400 which runs along the coast is about 3 kilometres (1.9 mi) to the north. The distance from the cape to Anamur is about 7 kilometres (4.3 mi).

== See also ==
- Anamur Lighthouse
