= Çukurpınar Cave =

Cave in Mersin Province, Turkey

- Interactive map of Çukurpınar Cave
- Location: Mersin Province, Turkey
- Coordinates: 36°17′53″N 32°42′44″E
- Depth: 1,196 m (3,924 ft)
- Length: 3,350 m (10,990 ft)

Çukurpınar Cave is a cave in Mersin Province, Turkey.

The cave is in the rural area of Anamur ilçe (district) close to Sugözü village. It is next to Egma Sinkhole. The distance from Anamur is about 40 kilometres (25 mi) and from Mersin is about 260 kilometres (160 mi).

The location is a yayla (temporary summer camp) of Kükür village and the cave was discovered by a citizen of Kükür. The exploration was carried out between 24 July 1989 and 6 September 1992 in five phases by Bümak, the caving club of Boğaziçi University.

The depth of the cave is 1,196 metres (3,924 ft), which makes the cave the third deepest cave in Turkey (the first is the nearby Egma Sinkhole). Its length is 3,350 metres (10,990 ft). There are two ponds in the cave and the water from the ponds is discharged to Dragon Creek.
