= Anamur Lighthouse =

Lighthouse in the province of Mersin, Turkey

Anamur Lighthouse Anamur Feneri
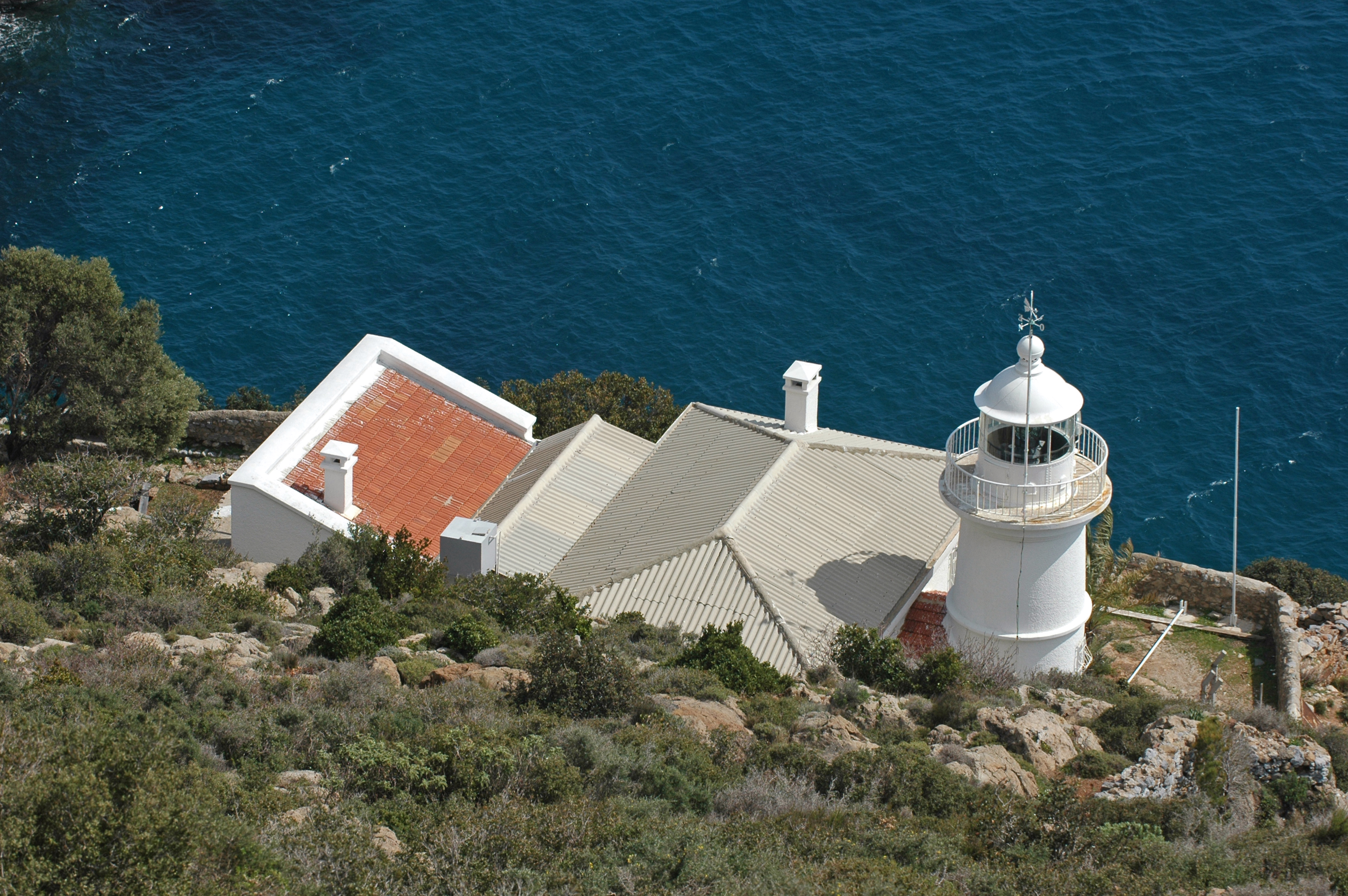
- Anemurium Citadel on Cape Anamur
- Location: Anamur, Turkey
- Coordinates: 36°01′03″N 32°48′10″E

Tower
- Constructed: 1911
- Construction: masonry
- Height: 10 m (33 ft)
- Shape: cylinder
- Markings: white, stripe (2, black, horizontal direction)

Light
- Focal height: 68 m (223 ft)
- Range: 20 nmi (37 km; 23 mi)
- Characteristic: Fl(2) W 5s

Anamur Lighthouse is a lighthouse in Anamur ilçe (district) of Mersin Province, Turkey.

The lighthouse is located in a headland at the southernmost point of Anatolian Peninsula at 36°01′03″N 32°48′10″E. Ören town of Anamur is 4 kilometres (2.5 mi) to the north of the lighthouse. Its distance to Anamur is 10 kilometres (6.2 mi) and to Mersin is 232 kilometres (144 mi).

== History ==
The lighthouse was constructed by a French firm in 1911, during the Ottoman Empire. Originally it was fuel powered lighthouse . But beginning by 1999 its power source is electricity.

The altitude of the lighthouse is 68 metres (223 ft) and its height over the terrain is 10 metres (33 ft) It flashes twice per 10 seconds. Its visibility is 20 nautical miles.
