= Charadros (disambiguation) =

Charadros or Charadrus (Ancient Greek: Χάραδρος) may refer to:

- Charadros, a river of Achaea, Greece
- Charadrus, a town of ancient Cilicia, now in Turkey
- Charadrus (Acte), a city of ancient Acte, now Mt Athos, Greece
- Charadrus (Epirus), a town of ancient Epirus, Greece
