= Çataloluk =

Çataloluk may refer to:

- Çataloluk, Anamur, a village in the district Anamur, Mersin Province, Turkey
- Çataloluk, Kaş, a village in the district of Kaş, Antalya Province, Turkey
