= Rygmanoi =

Town on the coast of ancient Cilicia

Coordinates: 36°05′05″N 32°53′50″E

Rygmanoi was a town on the coast of ancient Cilicia, east of Anemurium at the mouth of the Orymagdos River.

Platanus is tentatively located near the mouth of the modern Anamur Çay in Asiatic Turkey.
