= Charadrus =

Town and fortress of Cilicia

Coordinates: 36°06′36″N 32°34′11″E

Charadrus or Charadros (Ancient Greek: Χάραδρος) was a town on the coast of ancient Cilicia, between Platanus and Cragus, according to the Stadiasmus. Strabo, who writes it Χαραδροῦς, describes it as a fort with a port below it, and a mountain Andriclus above it. It is described by Francis Beaufort "as an opening through the mountains with a small river." The mountain is mentioned in the Stadiasmus under the name Androcus.

Charadrus is located near modern Yakacık (formerly Kaledıran İskelesi), in Turkey.
