= Çukurabanoz =

- Neighbourhood
- Location in Turkey
- Coordinates: 36°18′N 32°53′E
- Country: Turkey
- Province: Mersin
- District: Anamur
- Elevation: 860 m (2,820 ft)
- Population (2022): 138
- Time zone: UTC+3 (TRT)
- Postal code: 33630
- Area code: 0324

Çukurabanoz is a neighbourhood in the municipality and district of Anamur, Mersin Province, Turkey. Its population is 138 (2022). It is situated in the Taurus Mountains. A remote neighbourhood of the village to the east of Çukurabanoz is known as Abanoz. Abanoz has no settled population and it is the yayla (resort) of Anamur residents. The distance from Çukurabanoz to Anamur is 49 kilometres (30 mi).
