= Teniste =

Teniste may refer to:

- Taijo Teniste (b. 1988), Estonian footballer playing for FC Levadia Tallinn
- Güngören, Anamur a village in Anamur ilçe (district) of Mersin Province, Turkey
