= Abanoz =

Abanoz is a Turkish name. It may refer to:

== People ==
- Salim Abanoz, Turkish judoka
- Salise Abanoz, Turkish teacher and politician

== Places ==
- Abanoz, Mersin, a summer resort in district of Anamur, Mersin Province, Turkey
