= Çamlıpınar =

Çamlıpınar can refer to:

- Çamlıpınar, Anamur
- Çamlıpınar, Cumayeri
- Çamlıpınar, Laçin
