= Aşağıkükür =

- Neighbourhood
- Location in Turkey
- Coordinates: 36°10′N 32°47′E
- Country: Turkey
- Province: Mersin
- District: Anamur
- Elevation: 375 m (1,230 ft)
- Population (2022): 117
- Time zone: UTC+3 (TRT)
- Postal code: 33630
- Area code: 0324

Aşağıkükür is a neighbourhood in the municipality and district of Anamur, Mersin Province, Turkey. Its population is 117 (2022). It is situated in the forests. Until 1970 Aşağıkükür was a part of Kükür.
