= Demirören =

Demiören is a Turkish word meaning iron braider and may refer to:

== Company ==
- Demirören Group, a Turkish conglomerate

== Surname ==
- Yıldırım Demirören (born 1964), Turkish businessman and current president of the Turkish Football Federation

== Place ==
- Demirören, Anamur, a village in Anamur district of Mersin Province, Turkey
- Demirören, Kargı
