= Alataş =

- Neighbourhood
- Location in Turkey
- Coordinates: 36°03′54″N 32°47′17″E
- Country: Turkey
- Province: Mersin
- District: Anamur
- Elevation: 35 m (115 ft)
- Population (2022): 442
- Time zone: UTC+3 (TRT)
- Postal code: 33630
- Area code: 0324

Alataş is a neighbourhood in the municipality and district of Anamur, Mersin Province, Turkey. Its population is 442 (2022). Situated to the north of Ören it is almost merged to Anamur. Banana is the main crop of the village.
