= Güleç =

Güleç (IPA: [gyˈletʃ], literally "smiling", "cheerful") is a Turkish surname and toponym and may refer to:

== List of surname holders ==
- Funda Güleç (born 2003), Turkish female kickboxer
- Gökhan Güleç (born 1985), Turkish footballer
- Rabia Gülec (born 1994), German taekwondo athlete of Turkish descent
- Sümeyye Güleç (born 1989), German taekwondo athlete of Turkish descent
- Tahir Güleç (born 1993), German taekwondo athlete of Turkish descent
- Tolga Güleç (born 1981), Turkish actor

== Place name ==
- Güleç, Anamur, village in Anamur district of Mersin Province, Turkey
- Güleç, Biga, village in Biga district of Çanakkale Province, Turkey
- Güleç, Kulp, village in Kulp district of Diyarbakır Province, Turkey
- Güleç, Mazgirt, village in Mazgirt district of Tunceli Province, Turkey
