= Kaşdişlen =

- Neighbourhood
- Location in Turkey
- Coordinates: 36°07′N 32°51′E
- Country: Turkey
- Province: Mersin
- District: Anamur
- Elevation: 20 m (66 ft)
- Population (2022): 387
- Time zone: UTC+3 (TRT)
- Postal code: 33630
- Area code: 0324

Kaşdişlen is a neighbourhood in the municipality and district of Anamur, Mersin Province, Turkey. Its population is 387 (2022). It is almost merged to Anamur. Its distance to Anamur is 5 kilometres (3.1 mi). The village is inhabited by Tahtacı.
