= Kılıç, Anamur =

Kılıç
- Neighbourhood
- Location in Turkey
- Coordinates: 36°14′N 32°47′E
- Country: Turkey
- Province: Mersin
- District: Anamur
- Elevation: 450 m (1,480 ft)
- Population (2022): 54
- Time zone: UTC+3 (TRT)
- Postal code: 33630
- Area code: 0324

Kılıç is a neighbourhood in the municipality and district of Anamur, Mersin Province, Turkey. Its population is 54 (2022). It is situated in the Toros Mountains. It is 22 kilometres (14 mi) away from Anamur.
