= Güneybahşiş, Anamur =

Güneybahşiş
- Neighbourhood
- Location within Turkey
- Coordinates: 36°11′N 32°52′E
- Country: Turkey
- Province: Mersin
- District: Anamur
- Elevation: 135 m (443 ft)
- Population (2022): 703
- Time zone: UTC+3 (TRT)
- Postal code: 33630
- Area code: 0324

Güneybahşiş is a neighbourhood in the municipality and district of Anamur, Mersin Province, Turkey. Its population is 703 (2022). It is situated to the north of Anamur in a highly populated area. Its distance to Anamur is 12 kilometres (7.5 mi).

The population of the village is composed of Kipchak people. The term "Bahşiş" was originally used by the tribe that founded this neighbourhood, but it is actually derived from the word "Bağış," which means "Deer" in English. Over time, it underwent changes and variations, such as "Bağışış" and "Bahaşış." This tribe was divided into different groups, namely "Gerce Bağışış" (deer with various colors) and "Karalar Bağışış" (black deer). The origins of this tribe can be traced back to the Bağış tribe in Kyrgyzstan, and they were later under the administration of the Qara Qoyunlu dynasty for a period of time. Furthermore, the Bağış tribe in Kyrgyzstan is divided into groups such as "Çon Bağış" (Чоң багыш), "Bağış" (Багыш), "Sarıbağış" (Сарыбагыш), "Üçbağış" (үч багыш), and "Karabağış" (Карабагыш). It is likely that the Güney, Gerce, and Karalar Bağışış tribes, having followed a similar division, came to Anatolia and continued to use these names.
