= Karaağa, Anamur =

Neighbourhood in Mersin, Turkey

Karaağa
- Neighbourhood
- Location in Turkey
- Coordinates: 36°13′52″N 32°35′6″E
- Country: Turkey
- Province: Mersin
- District: Anamur
- Elevation: 960 m (3,150 ft)
- Population (2022): 160
- Time zone: UTC+3 (TRT)
- Postal code: 33630
- Area code: 0324

Karaağa is a neighbourhood in the municipality and district of Anamur, Mersin Province, Turkey. Its population is 160 (2022). It is one of the westernmost villages of the province. It situated in the Toros Mountains. Its distance to Anamur is 45 kilometres (28 mi).
