= Çeltikçi, Anamur =

Çeltikçi
- Neighbourhood
- Location in Turkey
- Coordinates: 36°05′N 32°51′E
- Country: Turkey
- Province: Mersin
- District: Anamur
- Elevation: 30 m (98 ft)
- Population (2022): 706
- Time zone: UTC+3 (TRT)
- Area code: 0324

Çeltikçi is a neighbourhood in the municipality and district of Anamur, Mersin Province, Turkey. Its population is 706 (2022). It is very close to the city of Anamur, which is west of Çeltikçi. Like most other villages around, it is a dispersed settlement with greenhouse gardens and banana plantation within the village.
