= Karadere, Anamur =

Karadere
- Neighbourhood
- Location in Turkey
- Coordinates: 36°04′12″N 32°46′55″E
- Country: Turkey
- Province: Mersin
- District: Anamur
- Elevation: 50 m (160 ft)
- Population (2022): 463
- Time zone: UTC+3 (TRT)
- Postal code: 33630
- Area code: 0324

Karadere is a neighbourhood in the municipality and district of Anamur, Mersin Province, Turkey. Its population is 463 (2022).
