= Evciler, Anamur =

Evciler
- Neighbourhood
- Location in Turkey
- Coordinates: 36°10′N 32°55′E
- Country: Turkey
- Province: Mersin
- District: Anamur
- Elevation: 110 m (360 ft)
- Population (2022): 584
- Time zone: UTC+3 (TRT)
- Postal code: 33630
- Area code: 0324

Evciler is a neighbourhood in the municipality and district of Anamur, Mersin Province, Turkey. Its population is 584 (2022). It is situated in the peneplane area to the south of Toros Mountains. Its distance to Anamur is 12 kilometres (7.5 mi).
