= Karalarbahşiş =

- Neighbourhood
- Location in Turkey
- Coordinates: 36°09′N 32°52′E
- Country: Turkey
- Province: Mersin
- District: Anamur
- Elevation: 75 m (246 ft)
- Population (2022): 1,235
- Time zone: UTC+3 (TRT)

Karalarbahşiş is a neighbourhood in the municipality and district of Anamur, Mersin Province, Turkey. Its population is 1,235 (2022). It is at the north east of Anamur.
