= Platanus (Cilicia) =

Former town

Coordinates: 36°03′23″N 32°41′25″E

Platanus or Platanous (Ancient Greek: Πλατανοῦς) was a town on the coast of Cilicia Aspera, west of Anemurium. The Stadiasmus Maris Magni places Platanus 350 stadia from Anemurium, which is most likely incorrect. William Smith posited a distance of 150 stadia.

Platanus is tentatively located near modern Melleç İskelesi, in Asiatic Turkey.
