= Uçarı, Anamur =

Uçarı
- Neighbourhood
- Location in Turkey
- Coordinates: 36°06′N 32°38′E
- Country: Turkey
- Province: Mersin
- District: Anamur
- Elevation: 350 m (1,150 ft)
- Population (2022): 306
- Time zone: UTC+3 (TRT)
- Area code: 0324

Uçarı is a neighbourhood in the municipality and district of Anamur, Mersin Province, Turkey. Its population is 306 (2022). It is situated in the Toros Mountains on Turkish state highway D.400 which connects Mersin to Antalya. Its distance from Anamur is 18 kilometres (11 mi).
