= Malaklar =

- Neighbourhood
- Location in Turkey
- Coordinates: 36°08′N 32°50′E
- Country: Turkey
- Province: Mersin
- District: Anamur
- Elevation: 105 m (344 ft)
- Population (2022): 2,160
- Time zone: UTC+3 (TRT)
- Area code: 0324

Malaklar is a neighbourhood in the municipality and district of Anamur, Mersin Province, Turkey. Its population is 2,160 (2022). It is at the north east of Anamur.
