= Karaçukur, Anamur =

Karaçukur
- Neighbourhood
- Location in Turkey
- Coordinates: 36°09′N 32°40′E
- Country: Turkey
- Province: Mersin
- District: Anamur
- Elevation: 830 m (2,720 ft)
- Population (2022): 485
- Time zone: UTC+3 (TRT)
- Area code: 0324

Karaçukur is a neighbourhood in the municipality and district of Anamur, Mersin Province, Turkey. Its population is 485 (2022). It is situated in the forests of Toros Mountains to the northwest of Anamur. The distance to Anamur is 23 kilometres (14 mi) and to Mersin is 253 kilometres (157 mi).
