= Ovabaşı, Anamur =

Ovabaşı
- Neighbourhood
- Location in Turkey
- Coordinates: 36°07′N 32°46′E
- Country: Turkey
- Province: Mersin
- District: Anamur
- Elevation: 90 m (300 ft)
- Population (2022): 284
- Time zone: UTC+3 (TRT)
- Area code: 0324

Ovabaşı is a neighbourhood in the municipality and district of Anamur, Mersin Province, Turkey. Its population is 284 (2022). It is situated in the southern slopes of Toros Mountains to the north of Anamur. Its distance to Anamur is 15 kilometres (9.3 mi). It is surrounded by orange groves. The orange produced in the village is known as "Ovabaşı orange" (Turkish: Ovabaşı portakalı).

== Köşekbükü asthma cave ==
There is a cave to the south of the village known as "Köşekbükü cave". A sign at the cave claims that respiration inside the cave can cure asthma. According to local legend a certain Anna, allegedly a daughter of a Roman Emperor named Antiochus, was cured in the cave.
