= Korucuk, Anamur =

Korucuk
- Neighbourhood
- Location in Turkey
- Coordinates: 36°06′N 32°44′E
- Country: Turkey
- Province: Mersin
- District: Anamur
- Elevation: 140 m (460 ft)
- Population (2022): 209
- Time zone: UTC+3 (TRT)
- Postal code: 33630
- Area code: 0324

Korucuk is a neighbourhood in the municipality and district of Anamur, Mersin Province, Turkey. Its population is 209 (2022). It is situated to the northwest of Anamur. Its distance to Anamur is 10 kilometres (6.2 mi).
