= Kızılaliler =

- Neighbourhood
- Location in Turkey
- Coordinates: 36°03′47″N 32°46′23″E
- Country: Turkey
- Province: Mersin
- District: Anamur
- Elevation: 100 m (330 ft)
- Population (2022): 891
- Time zone: UTC+3 (TRT)
- Postal code: 33630
- Area code: 0324

Kızılaliler is a neighbourhood in the municipality and district of Anamur, Mersin Province, Turkey. Its population is 891 (2022). The distance to Anamur is 8 kilometres (5.0 mi). The village is situated on the lower slopes of the Toros Mountains.

There are Roman ruins at the north west of the village and there are ruins of a 6th-century (Byzantine) basilica so called Kızıl kilise ("Red church") in the village.
