= Emirşah =

Emirşah Ceritler
- Neighbourhood
- Location in Turkey
- Coordinates: 36°05′N 32°48′E
- Country: Turkey
- Province: Mersin
- District: Anamur
- Elevation: 25 m (82 ft)
- Population (2022): 708
- Time zone: UTC+3 (TRT)
- Postal code: 33630
- Area code: 0324

Emirşah is a neighbourhood in the municipality and district of Anamur, Mersin Province, Turkey. Its population is 708 (2022). It is northwest of Anamur. Although still a separate legal entity, it is about to merge with Anamur. The name of the village is composed of two Islamic titles, emir (lord) and şah (king). However, there is no historical record of any Islamic lordship centered in or around Emirşah; the origin of the name is therefore unknown. The village is also popularly known as "Ceritler'". This name refers to a rebellious Turkmen tribe which was forced to settle in various localities by the Ottoman government. The ruins of two churches in the village show that Greeks also lived in the village in the past. Like most villages in the surrounding area, Emirşah specializes in greenhouse agriculture and banana plantations.
