= Köprübaşı, Anamur =

Köprübaşı
- Neighbourhood
- Location in Turkey
- Coordinates: 36°06′N 32°51′E
- Country: Turkey
- Province: Mersin
- District: Anamur
- Elevation: 20 m (66 ft)
- Population (2022): 1,290
- Time zone: UTC+3 (TRT)

Köprübaşı is a neighbourhood in the municipality and district of Anamur, Mersin Province, Turkey. Its population is 1,290 (2022). It has almost merged to Çeltikçi, a town lying to the north east of Anamur.
