= Gercebahşiş =

- Neighbourhood
- Location in Turkey
- Coordinates: 36°09′N 32°53′E
- Country: Turkey
- Province: Mersin
- District: Anamur
- Elevation: 155 m (509 ft)
- Population (2022): 1,359
- Time zone: UTC+3 (TRT)

Gercebahşiş is a neighbourhood in the municipality and district of Anamur, Mersin Province, Turkey. Its population is 1,359 (2022). It is at the north east of Anamur.
