= Bozdoğan, Anamur =

Bozdoğan
- Neighbourhood
- Location in Turkey
- Coordinates: 36°06′N 32°55′E
- Country: Turkey
- Province: Mersin
- District: Anamur
- Elevation: 282 m (925 ft)
- Population (2022): 1,761
- Time zone: UTC+3 (TRT)

Bozdoğan is a neighbourhood in the municipality and district of Anamur, Mersin Province, Turkey. Its population is 1,761 (2022). It is at the east of Anamur and hosts the Mamure Castle.
