= Lale, Anamur =

Lale
- Neighbourhood
- Location in Turkey
- Coordinates: 36°12′32″N 32°34′52″E
- Country: Turkey
- Province: Mersin
- District: Anamur
- Elevation: 600 m (2,000 ft)
- Population (2022): 215
- Time zone: UTC+3 (TRT)
- Postal code: 33630
- Area code: 0324

Lale (or Laleköy, literally “tulip village” in Turkish) is a neighbourhood in the municipality and district of Anamur, Mersin Province, Turkey. Its population is 215 (2022). It is situated in the Taurus Mountains. It is one of the westernmost locations of Mersin Province. Its distance to Anamur is 32 kilometres (20 mi) and to Mersin is 270 kilometres (170 mi).
