= Sarıdana =

- Neighbourhood
- Location in Turkey
- Coordinates: 36°10′N 32°44′E
- Country: Turkey
- Province: Mersin
- District: Anamur
- Elevation: 850 m (2,790 ft)
- Population (2022): 147
- Time zone: UTC+3 (TRT)
- Area code: 0324

Sarıdana is a neighbourhood in the municipality and district of Anamur, Mersin Province, Turkey. Its population is 147 (2022). It is situated in Toros Mountains, 17 kilometres (11 mi) north west of Anamur.
