= Yakacık, Gazipaşa =

Yakacık Kaledran
- Neighbourhood
- Location in Turkey
- Coordinates: 36°06′N 32°33′E
- Country: Turkey
- Province: Antalya
- District: Gazipaşa
- Elevation: 100 m (330 ft)
- Population (2022): 324
- Time zone: UTC+3 (TRT)
- Postal code: 07900
- Area code: 0242

Yakacık is a neighbourhood in the municipality and district of Gazipaşa, Antalya Province, Turkey. Its population is 324 (2022).

== Geography ==
Yakacık is on Turkish state highway D.400 which runs from west to east in south Turkey and to the west of a creek named Kaledran Creek. It is the easternmost point of Antalya Province. It was issued from Anıtlı (then called Kaledran) on the other side of a creek which is in the neighbouring Mersin Province. However although the villages are officially issued, the residents still prefer to use the name Kaledran for both parts. The distance to Gazipaşa is 43 kilometres (27 mi) and to Antalya was 221 kilometres (137 mi).

== Economy ==
Like many Mediterranean coastline villages, Kaledran produces vegetables and fruits, especially bananas. With several natural beaches, Kaledran's potential for tourism is promising.
