= Çamlıpınaralanı =

- Neighbourhood
- Location in Turkey
- Coordinates: 36°02′N 32°44′E
- Country: Turkey
- Province: Mersin
- District: Anamur
- Elevation: 210 m (690 ft)
- Population (2022): 114
- Time zone: UTC+3 (TRT)
- Postal code: 33630
- Area code: 0324

Çamlıpınaralanı is a neighbourhood in the municipality and district of Anamur, Mersin Province, Turkey. Its population is 114 (2022). It is situated in the southern slopes of the Taurus Mountains, on Turkish state highway D.400, which runs from west to east in southern Turkey. It is close to the Mediterranean coast. Its distance to Anamur is 14 kilometres (8.7 mi).
