= Taşeli =

Karst plateau in Turkey

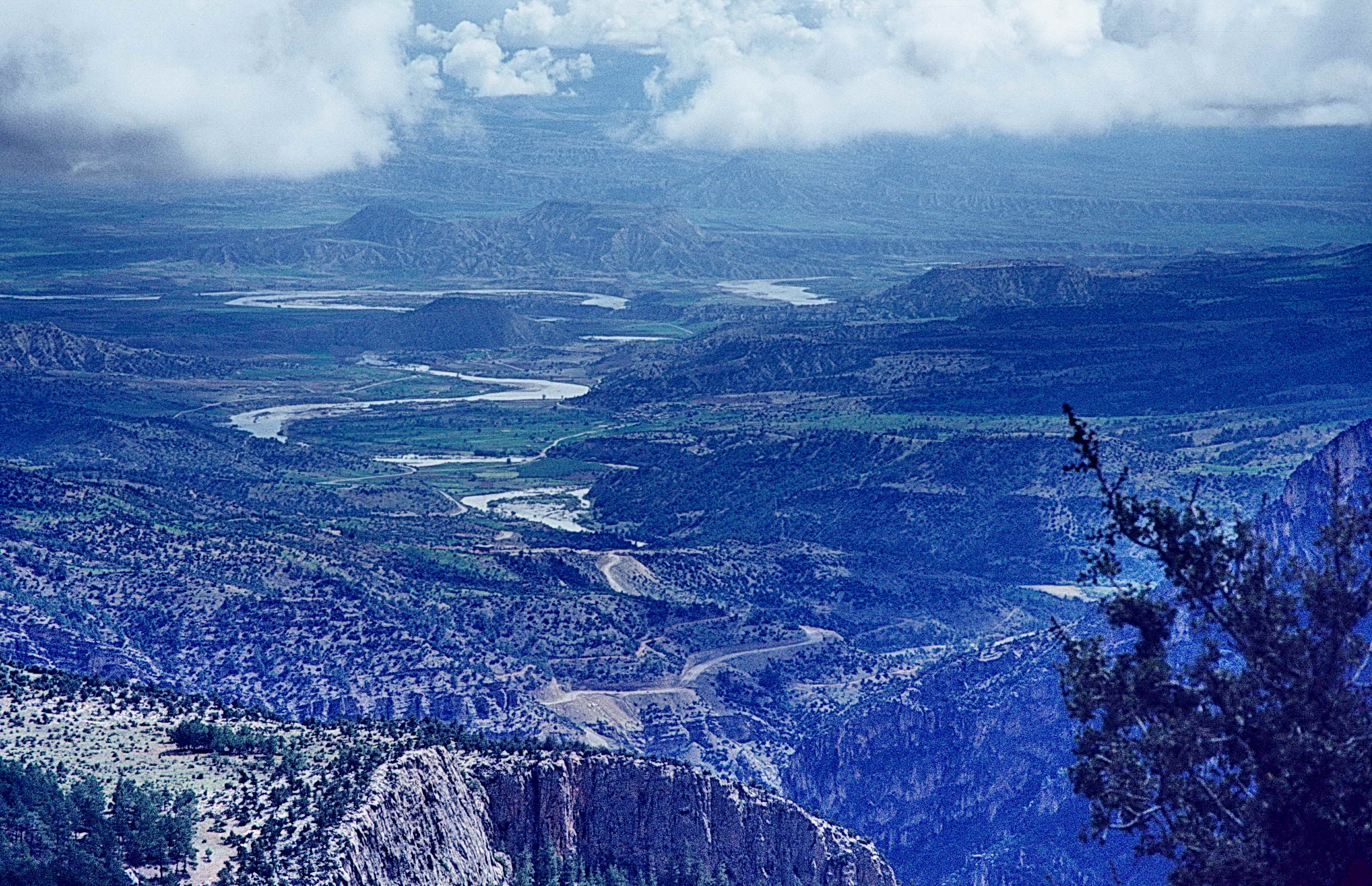
view from Taşeli Plateau toward confluence of Göksu River and Ermenek Stream

Taşeli (Turkish for 'stone land') is a karst plateau in southern Turkey, in the ancient Cilicia Trachea. Taşeli plateau roughly covers the districts of Ermenek, Başyayla, Sarıveliler (Karaman Province), Mut, Gülnar (Mersin Province), and Taşkent (Konya Province) as well as interior uplands of the coastal Anamur and Bozyazı districts in Mersin Province and Gazipaşa in Antalya Province. The river Göksu and its main tributary Ermenek Çayı flow on the plateau.

The Taşeli Peninsula (Turkish: Taşeli Yarımadası) on the Mediterranean Sea, bordering Silifke to the east and Alanya to the west, takes its name from the plateau.
