= Çarıklar =

Settlement in Turkey

- Neighbourhood
- Location in Turkey
- Coordinates: 36°06′N 32°52′E
- Country: Turkey
- Province: Mersin
- District: Anamur
- Elevation: 65 m (213 ft)
- Population (2022): 2,544
- Time zone: UTC+3 (TRT)
- Postal code: 33630
- Area code: 0324

Çarıklar is a neighbourhood in the municipality and district of Anamur, Mersin Province, Turkey. Its population is 2,544 (as of 2022). Before the 2013 reorganisation, it was a town (belde).

== Geography ==
The distance of the town center of Çarıklar to Anamur is only 7 kilometres (4.3 mi). Dragon River at the west of Çarıklar functions as the borderline between Anamur and Çarıklar. Çarıklar is one of the most dispersed settlements in Mersin Province with the north to south dimension in excess of 10 kilometres (6.2 mi).

== History ==
The 841-metre-tall (2,759 ft) hill Azıtepe and the ruins of the historical city of Alakise are within the town area. The present population of the town is known as Çaruklu who are members of a Turkmen tribe. In 1992, Çarıklar became a town.

== Economy ==
The main economic sectors are greenhouse agriculture and dairying. Strawberries and peanuts are the most important products.
