= Egma Sinkhole =

Sinkhole and deepest cave in Turkey

EGMA (Peynirlikönü) Sinkhole
- EGMA (Peynirlikönü) Düdeni
- Location within Turkey
- Location: Sugözü, Anamur, Mersin, Turkey
- Coordinates: 36°18′54″N 32°46′44″E
- Depth: 1,429 m (4,688 ft)
- Length: 3,118 m (10,230 ft)
- Discovery: 1993; 33 years ago
- Hazards: Cave floods in springtime
- Cave survey: 38°55′58″N 30°13′33″E

EGMA Sinkhole (Turkish: EGMA Düdeni), a.k.a. Peynirlikönü Sinkhole, is a sinkhole and the deepest cave in Turkey. It is located at Sugözü village of Anamur, Mersin. The sinkhole is 1,429 m (4,688 ft) deep and 3,118 m (10,230 ft) long. EGMA is an acronym that stands for Evren Günay - Mehmet Ali Özel.

The cave was discovered and first explored in 1993 by the Boğaziçi University Speleological Society (BÜMAK). A flash flood caused explorer Mehmet Ali Özel to lose his life inside the cave in 2001. In 2004, with the help of members of the Bulgarian Speleological Federation, the BÜMAK team recovered Mehmet Ali's body and also reached the deepest point of the cave.

== See also ==
- List of sinkholes of Turkey
- List of deepest caves
