= Boğuntu =

- Neighbourhood
- Location in Turkey
- Coordinates: 36°18′N 32°49′E
- Country: Turkey
- Province: Mersin
- District: Anamur
- Elevation: 650 m (2,130 ft)
- Population (2022): 201
- Time zone: UTC+3 (TRT)
- Postal code: 33630
- Area code: 0324

Boğuntu is a neighbourhood in the municipality and district of Anamur, Mersin Province, Turkey. Its population is 201 (2022). It is situated in a basin of the Taurus Mountains. Its distance to Anamur is about 30 kilometres (19 mi).
