= Çataloluk, Anamur =

Çataloluk
- Neighbourhood
- Location in Turkey
- Coordinates: 36°09′N 32°47′E
- Country: Turkey
- Province: Mersin
- District: Anamur
- Elevation: 420 m (1,380 ft)
- Population (2022): 373
- Time zone: UTC+3 (TRT)
- Postal code: 33630
- Area code: 0324

Çataloluk is a neighbourhood in the municipality and district of Anamur, Mersin Province, Turkey. Its population is 373 (2022). It is situated in the Taurus Mountains. Its distance to Anamur is 12 kilometres (7.5 mi).
