= Demirören, Anamur =

Demirören Melli
- Neighbourhood
- Location in Turkey
- Coordinates: 36°03′N 32°41′E
- Country: Turkey
- Province: Mersin
- District: Anamur
- Elevation: 50 m (160 ft)
- Population (2022): 625
- Time zone: UTC+3 (TRT)
- Area code: 0324

Demirören (Melli) is a neighbourhood in the municipality and district of Anamur, Mersin Province, Turkey. Its population is 625 (2022). It is situated on the state highway D.400 to the west of Anamur. Distance to Anamur is 15 kilometres (9.3 mi) and to Mersin is 240 kilometres (150 mi). The village is a banana producer.
