= Çamlıpınar, Anamur =

Çamlıpınar
- Neighbourhood
- Location in Turkey
- Coordinates: 36°11′N 32°40′E
- Country: Turkey
- Province: Mersin
- District: Anamur
- Elevation: 770 m (2,530 ft)
- Population (2022): 261
- Time zone: UTC+3 (TRT)
- Postal code: 33630
- Area code: 0324

Çamlıpınar is a neighbourhood in the municipality and district of Anamur, Mersin Province, Turkey. Its population is 261 (2022). It is situated in the forests. Its distance to Anamur is 30 kilometres (19 mi).
