= Charadrus (Acte) =

Ancient Greek city

Charadrus or Charadrous (Ancient Greek: Χαραδροῦς) was an ancient Greek city of the Acte headland of Chalcidice noted in the Periplus of Pseudo-Scylax The name is sometimes rendered as Charadriae (Χαραδρίαι).

Its site is unlocated.
