= Güleç, Anamur =

Güleç
- Neighbourhood
- Location in Turkey
- Coordinates: 36°06′N 32°48′E
- Country: Turkey
- Province: Mersin
- District: Anamur
- Elevation: 40 m (130 ft)
- Population (2022): 604
- Time zone: UTC+3 (TRT)
- Postal code: 33630
- Area code: 0324

Güleç is a neighbourhood in the municipality and district of Anamur, Mersin Province, Turkey. Its population is 604 (2022). It is almost merged to Anamur. Its distance to Anamur central town is 5 kilometres (3 mi).
