= Mamure Castle =

Castle in Turkey

- Anamur, Mersin Province, Turkey
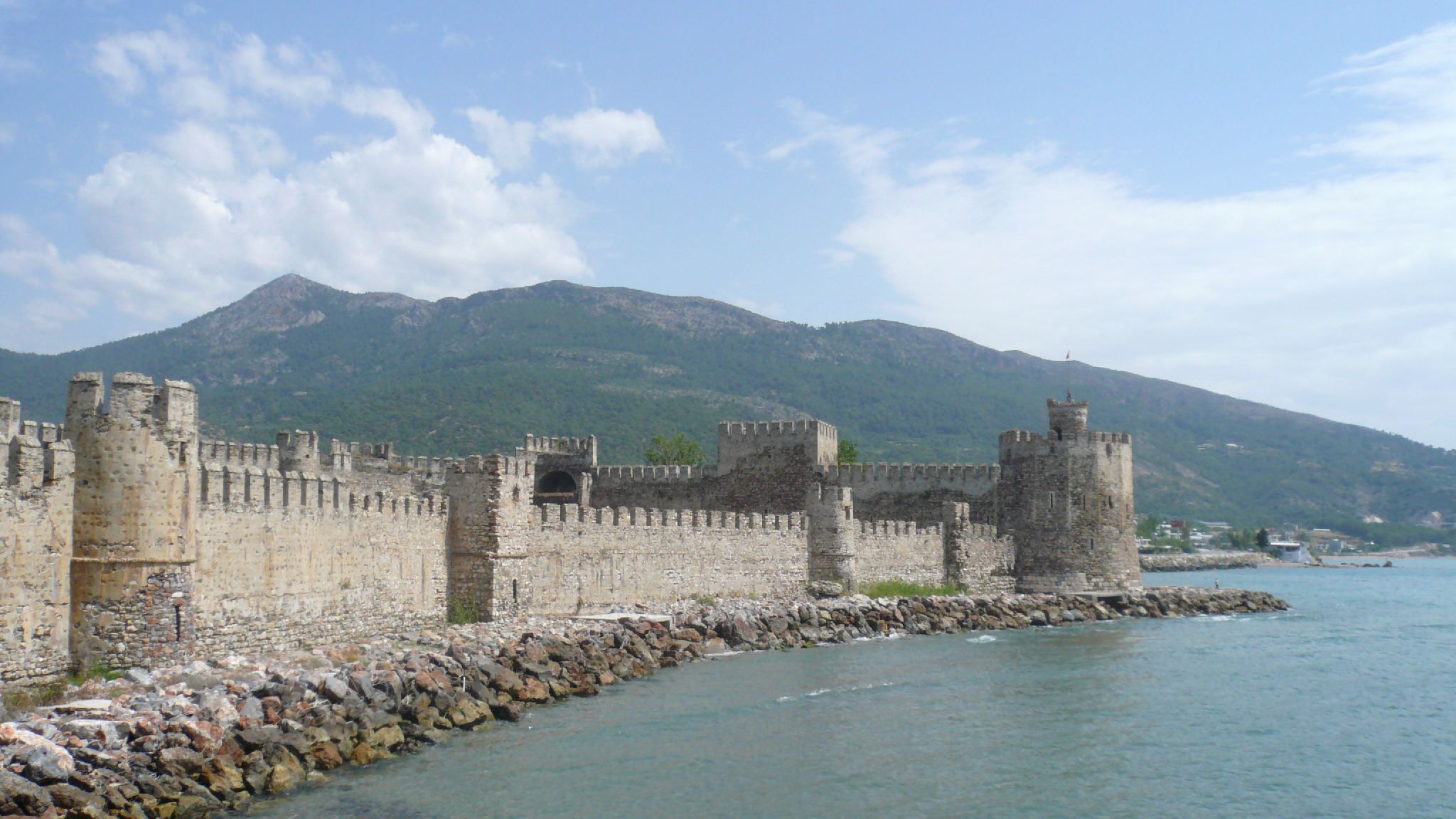

Site information
- Type: Fortress
- Open to the public: Yes
- Condition: Mostly standing.

Location
- Location within Turkey
- Coordinates: 36°04′51″N 32°53′40″E

Site history
- Built by: Roman Empire; Byzantine Empire; Armenian Kingdom of Cilicia; Seljuk Empire

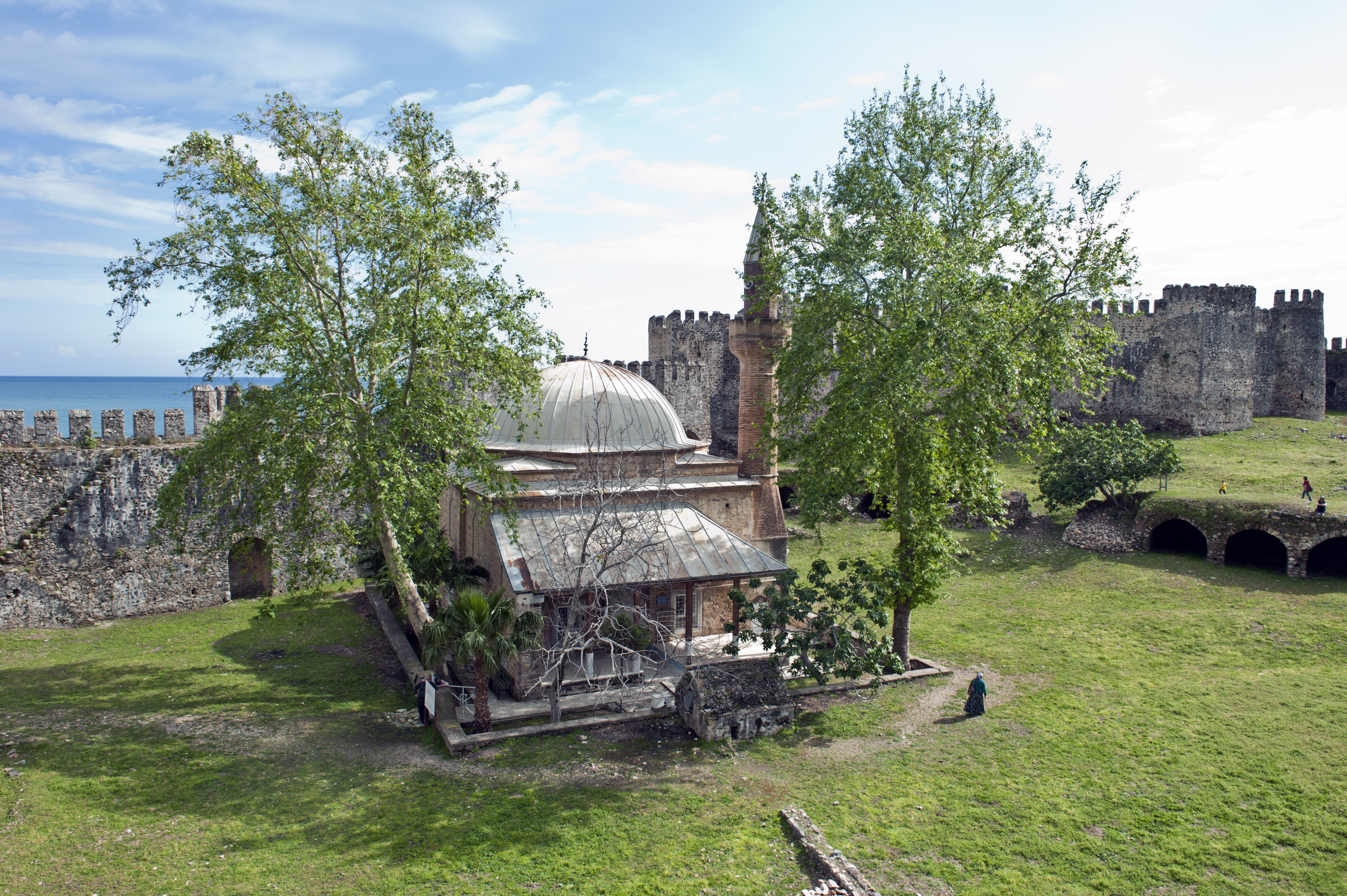
Mosque in Mamure castle

Mamure Castle (Turkish: Mamure Kalesi) is a medieval castle in the Bozdoğan village, Anamur ilçe (district) of Mersin Province, Turkey.

== Geography ==
The castle is on the Mediterranean coast about 36°04′51″N 32°53′40″E, on the D400 highway, 6 kilometres (3.7 mi) east of Anamur and 216 kilometres (134 mi) west of Mersin.

== History ==
The castle was built by the rulers of the Armenian Kingdom of Cilicia.

Designed to protect against pirates, it was repaired during the Byzantine era and during the Crusades. When Alaattin Keykubat I of Seljuk Turks captured the ruins of the castle in 1221, he built a larger castle using elements of the earlier fortifications. Later, it was controlled by the Karamanid dynasty (which was a Turkmen principality in Anatolia). Although the exact date is uncertain, according to an inscription by İbrahim II of Karaman in 1450, the castle was captured during Mahmut's reign (1300–1311). The castle was renamed as Mamure (prosperous) after repairs by Mahmut. In 1469, the castle was annexed by the Ottoman Empire. It was subsequently repaired in the 15th, 16th and 18th centuries and a part of the castle was used as a caravansarai.

== Architecture ==
The 23,500-square-metre (253,000 sq ft) castle is surrounded by moat. Its 39 towers and bastions are connected by wide ramparts. The castle has three main courtyards; to the west, the east and the south. The western courtyard contains a small complex of a single minaret mosque and a ruined hammam (bathhouse). The southern courtyard has the remains of a lighthouse.

== Cultural depiction ==
This castle appears to be the Kalendria on the coast of Cilicia depicted by William Henry Bartlett in 1836. See external links below for the image and an associated poetical illustration by Letitia Elizabeth Landon. (However, the name Kalendria refers to Kalenderis, what is now Aydıncık, another town about 60 km east of Mamure)

== Gallery ==
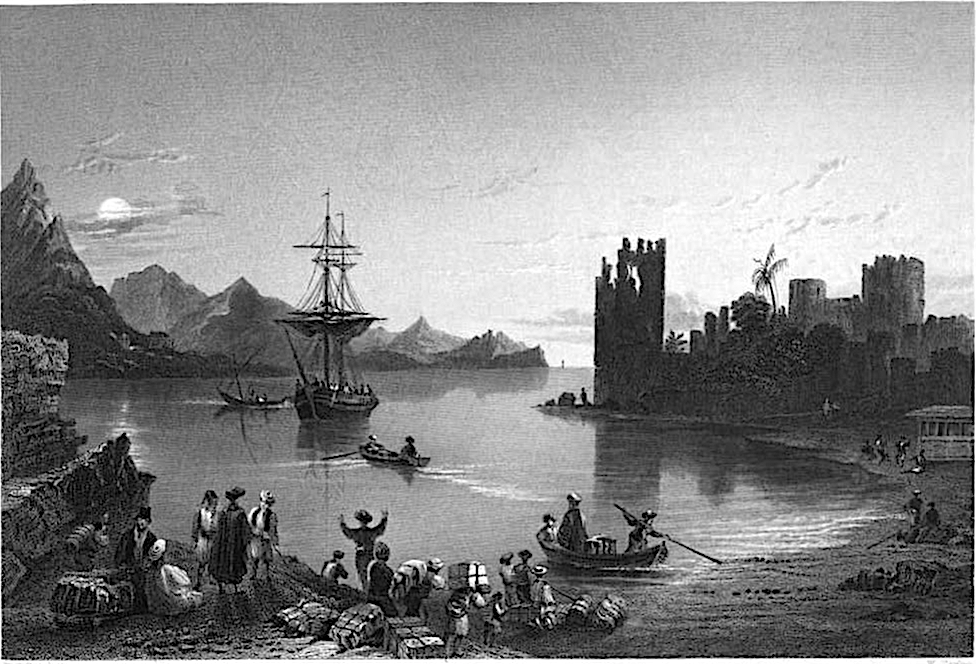
1838-38 Kalendria on the Coast of Cilicia

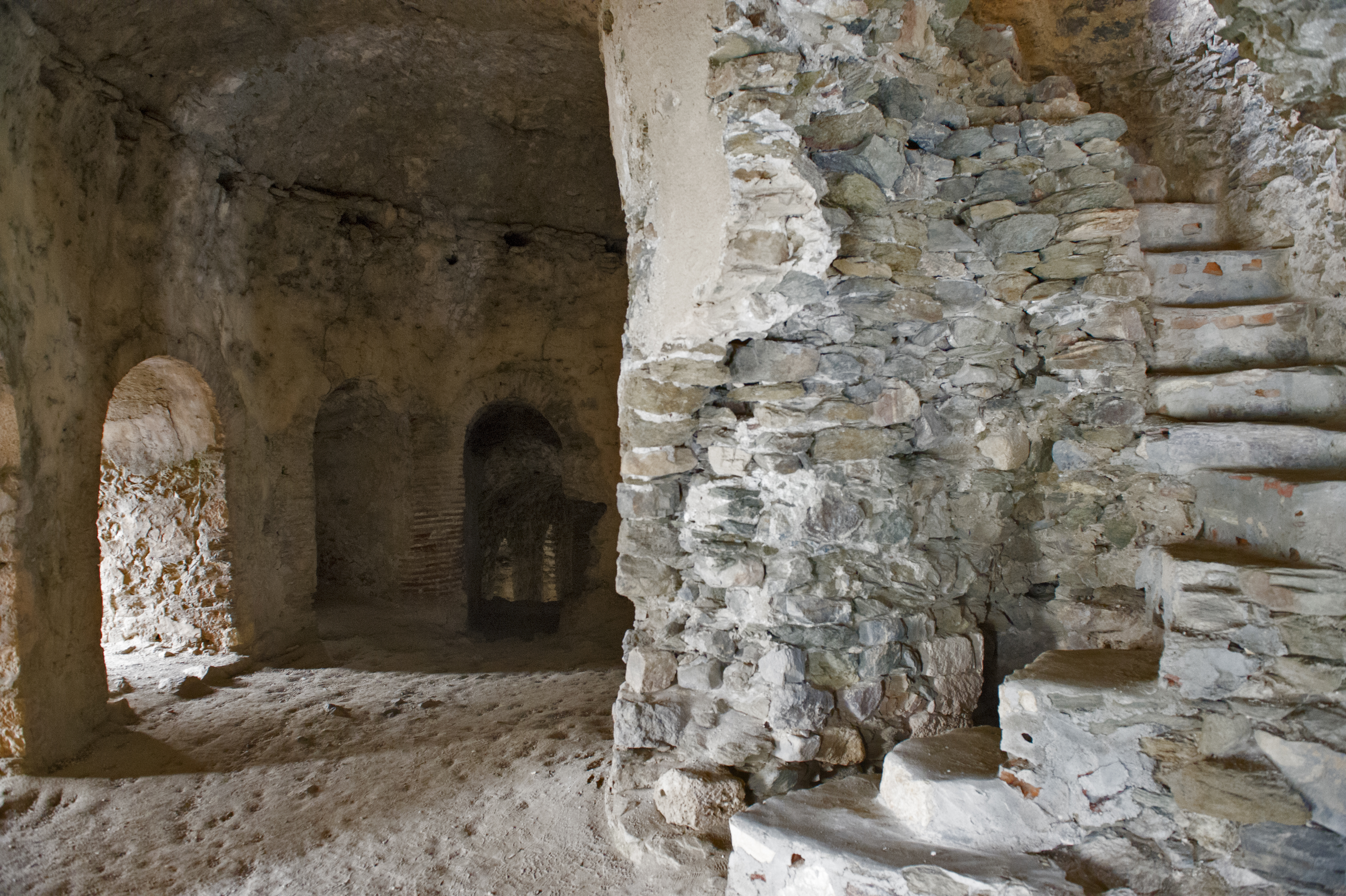
Anamur Castle Main tower view

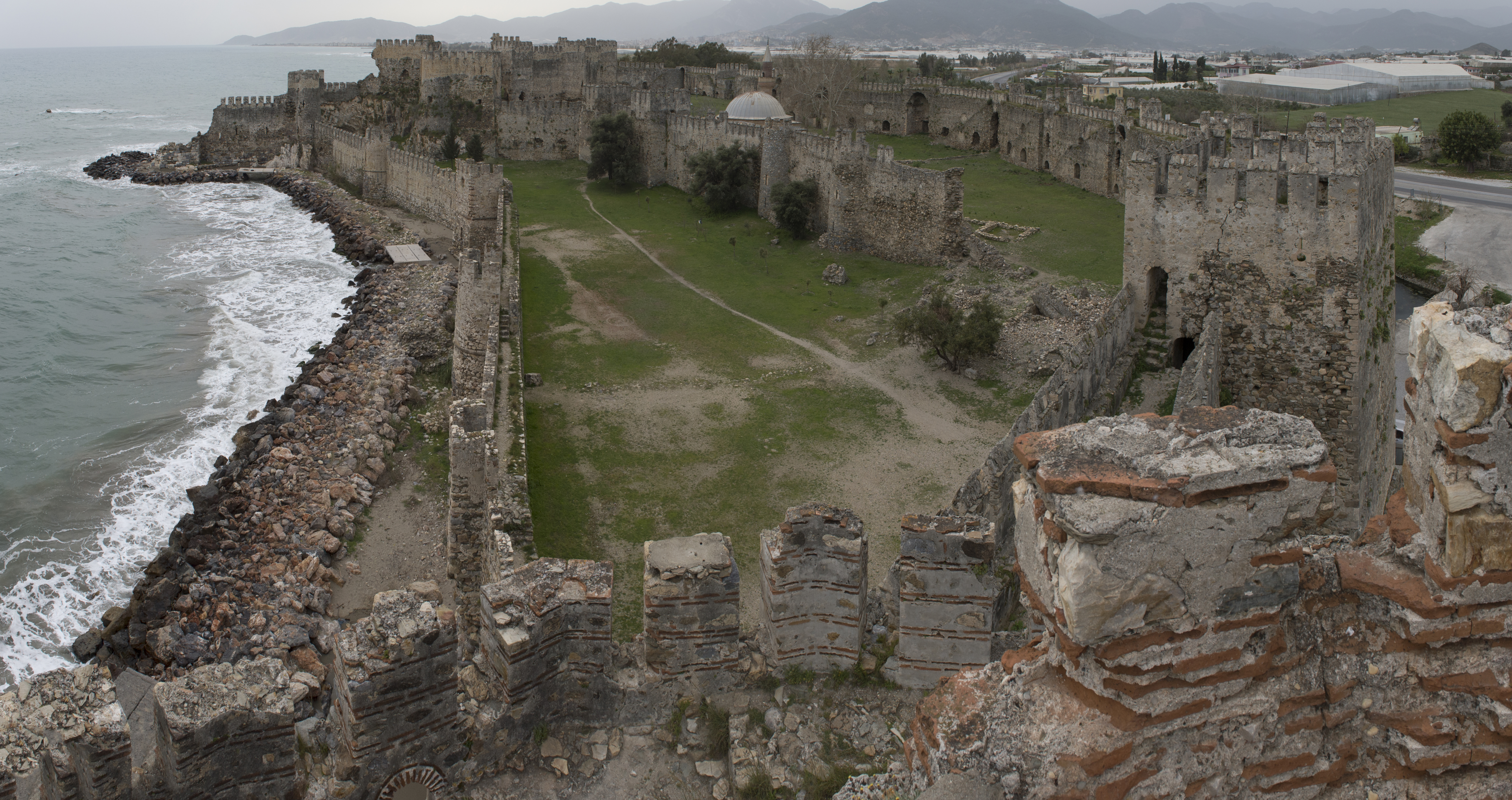
Anamur Castle Main tower view

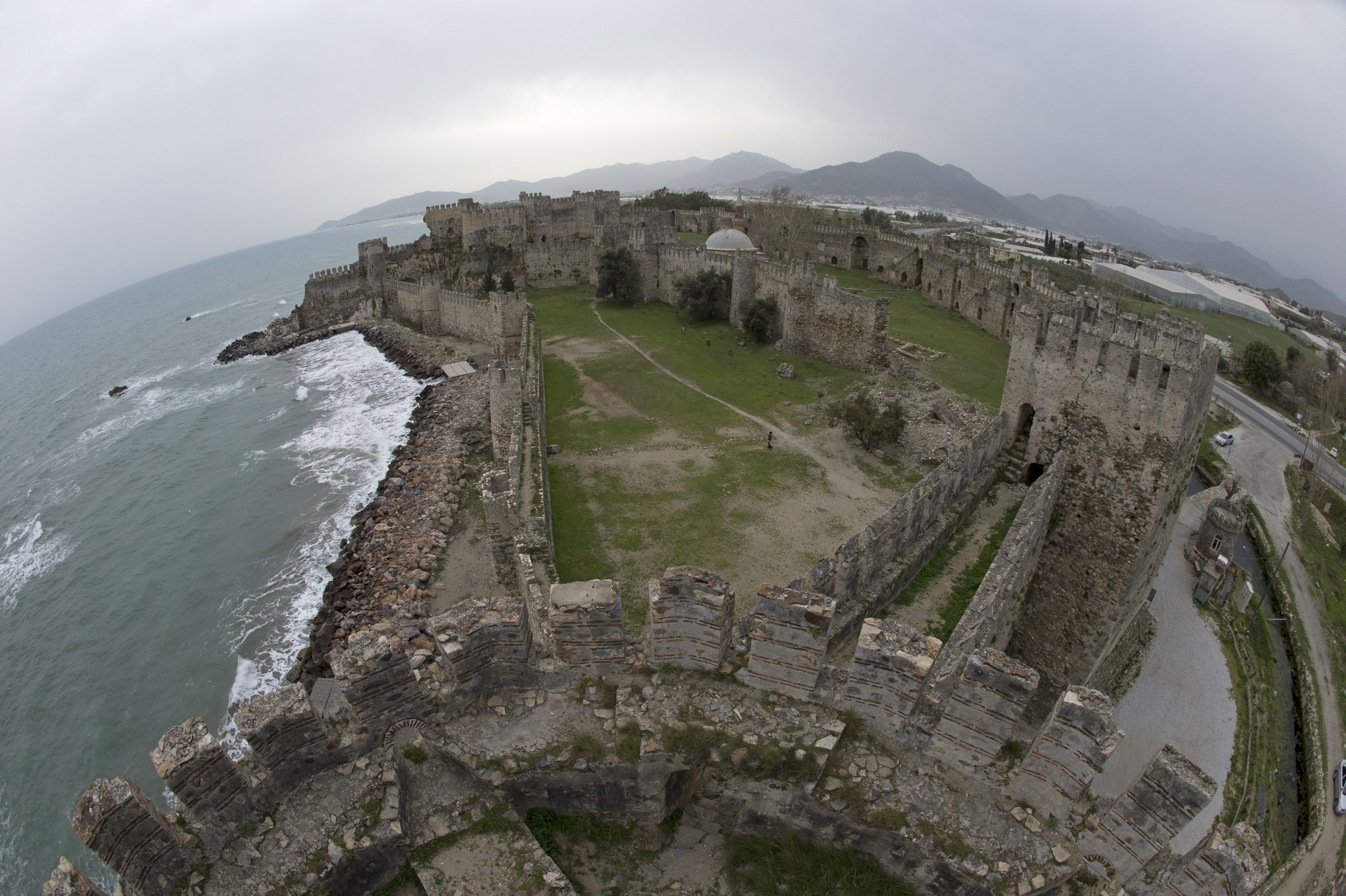
Anamur Castle Main tower view

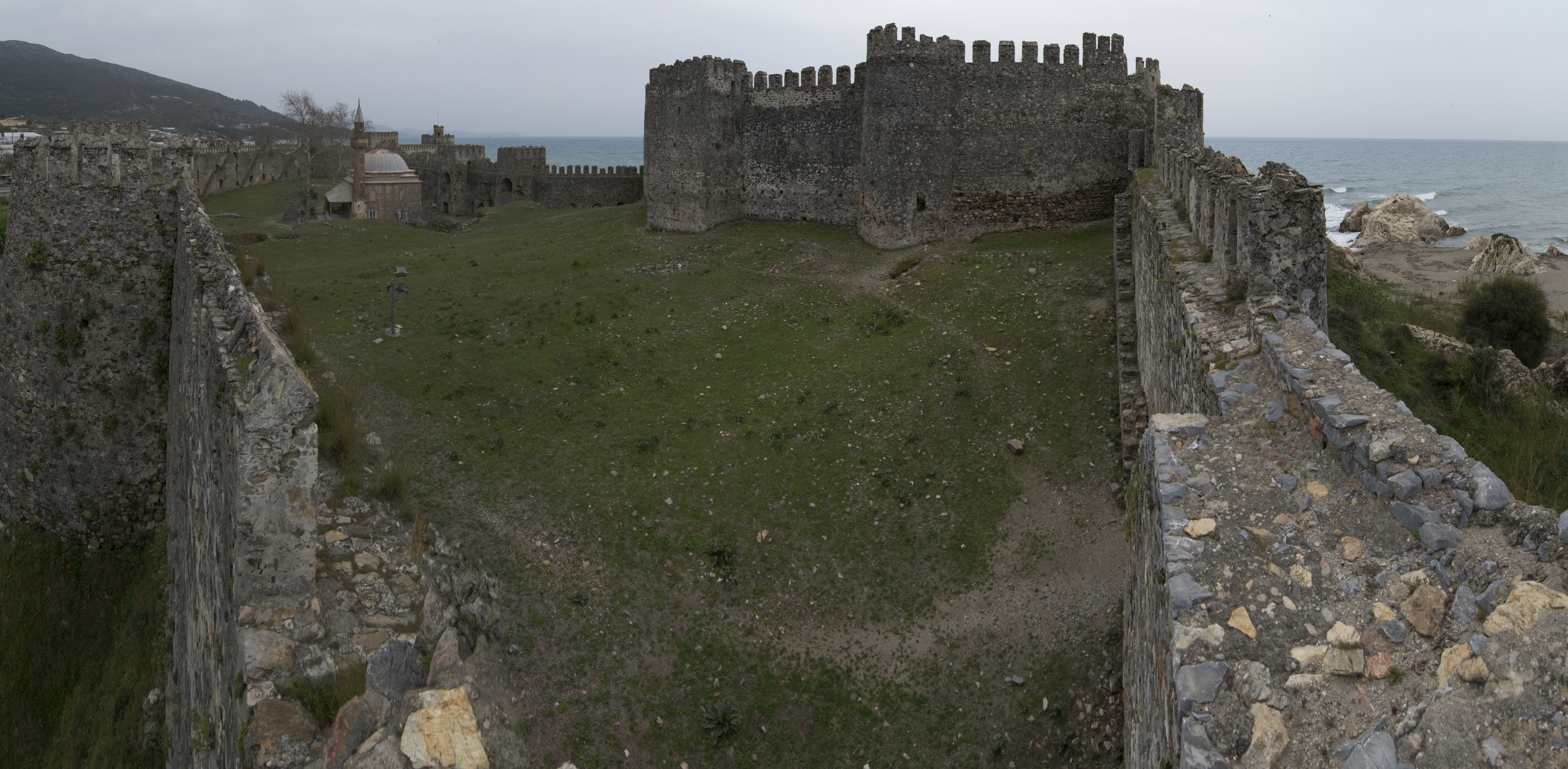
Anamur Castle Outer castle Panorama

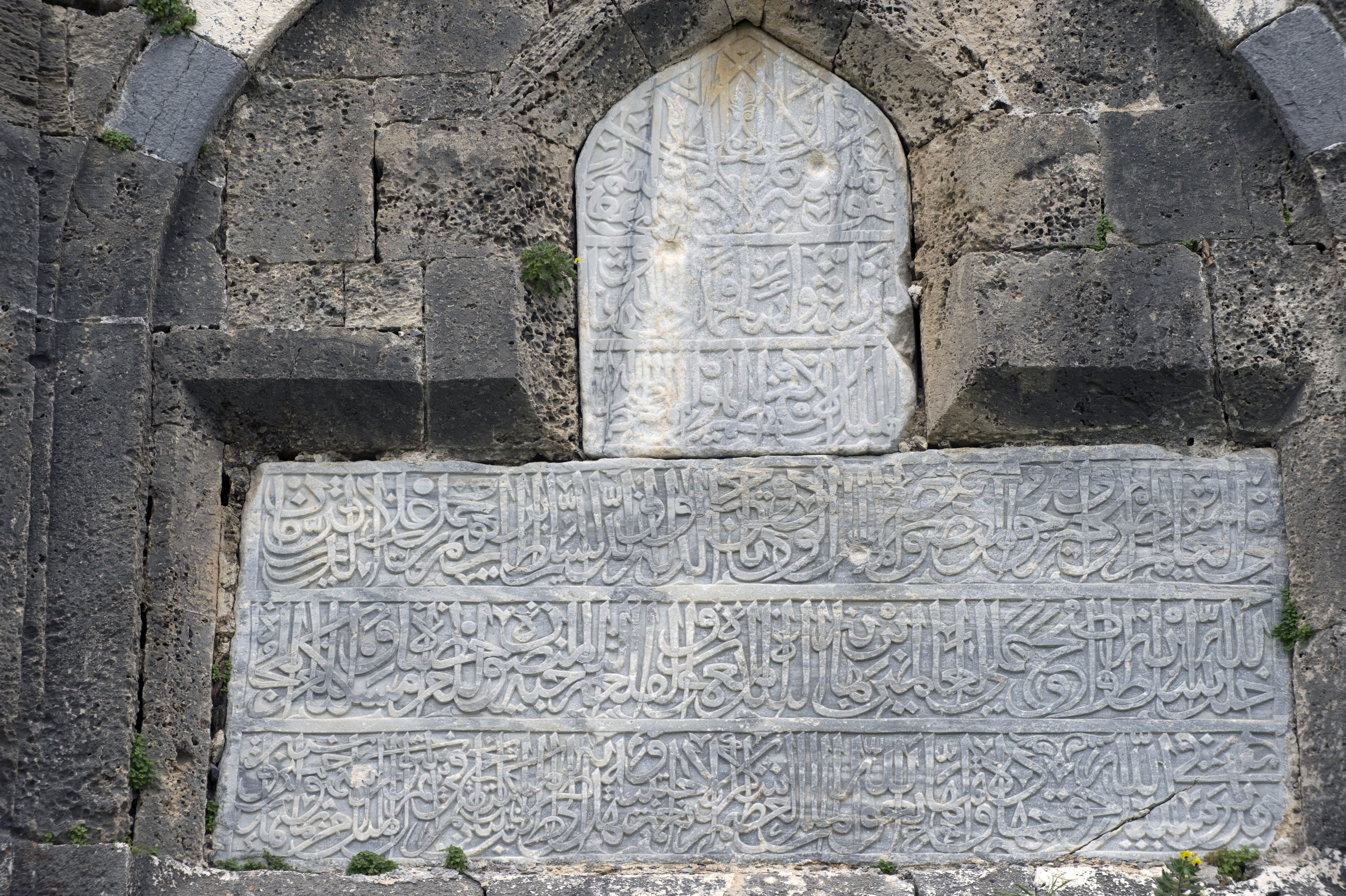
Anamur Castle North side

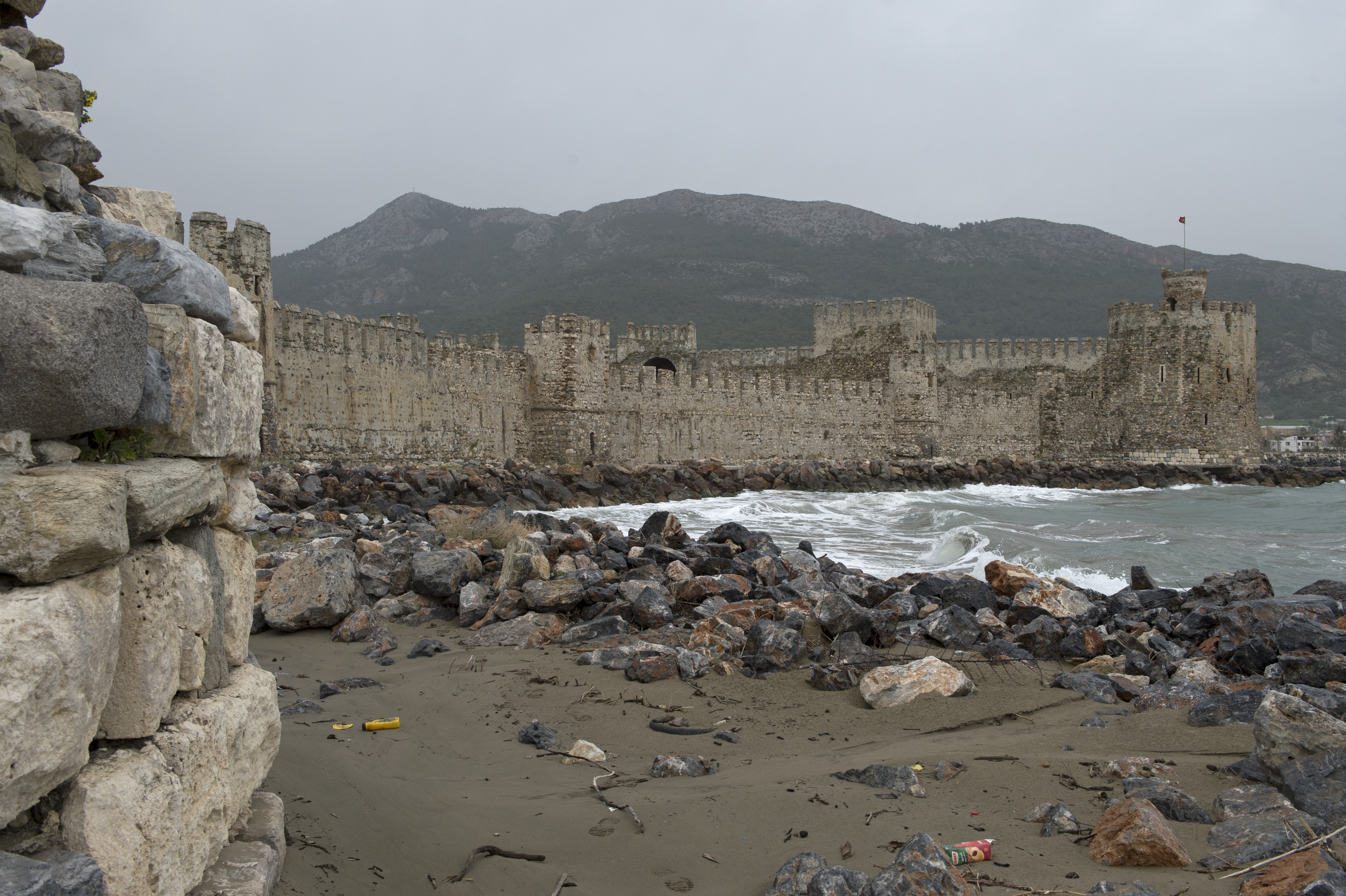
Anamur Castle Sea side

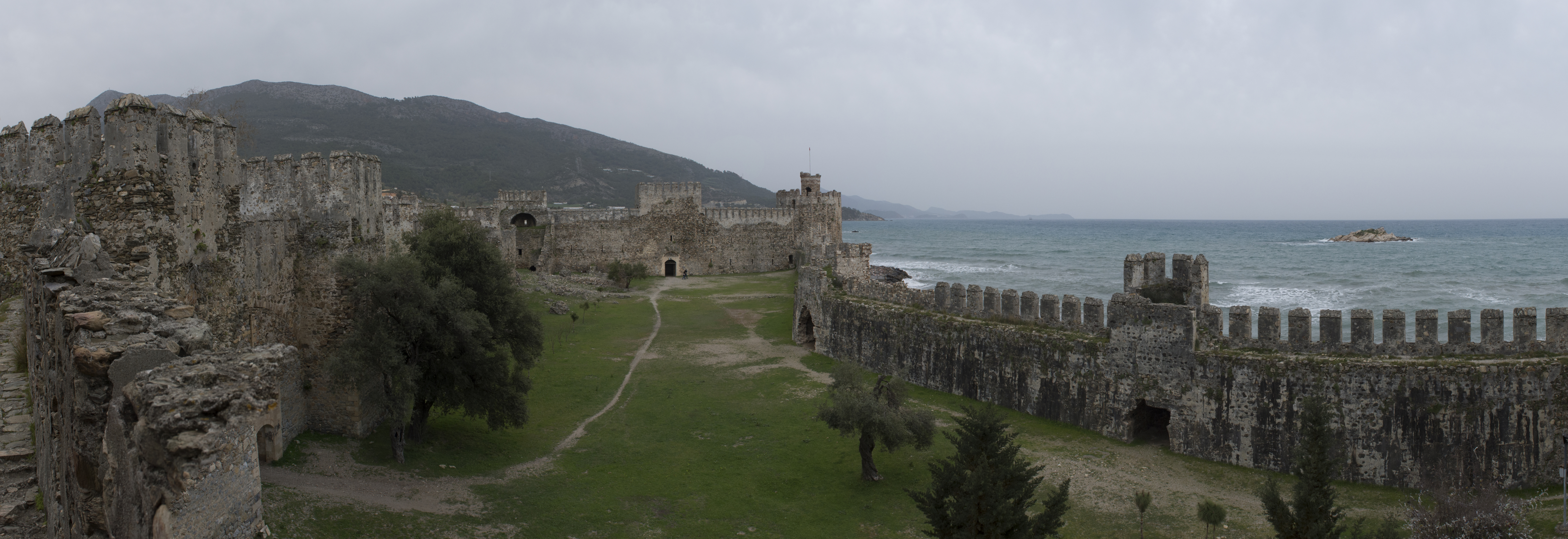
Anamur Castle Inner courtyard Panorama
