= Abanoz, Mersin =

Settlement in Turkey

Abanoz is a yayla (summer resort) in Mersin Province, Turkey

== Geography ==
Abanoz is actually a part of Çukurabanoz village of Anamur district in Mersin Province. It has no settled population but hosts visitors during summers. It is located in the Taurus Mountains, 52 kilometres (32 mi) away from Anamur.

== Etymology and the history ==
The name Abanoz in Turkish refers to the ebony tree (Diospyros ebenum), which is common around the yayla. There are traces of human habitation of ancient ages. The yayla culture, however, only dates back to Turkmen nomads after the 12th century. Abanoz had never been a permanent settlement. It was a summer camp of nomads for pasturing. However since the beginning of the 20th century it has also been a summer resort of people from Anamur and other cities which are hot during the summer.
