= Kükür, Anamur =

Kükür Yukarıkükür
- Neighbourhood
- Location in Turkey
- Coordinates: 36°13′N 32°42′E
- Country: Turkey
- Province: Mersin
- District: Anamur
- Elevation: 770 m (2,530 ft)
- Population (2022): 171
- Time zone: UTC+3 (TRT)
- Postal code: 33630
- Area code: 0324

Kükür (also: Yukarıkükür) is a neighbourhood in the municipality and district of Anamur, Mersin Province, Turkey. Its population is 171 (2022). It is situated in the forests.
