= Güngören, Anamur =

Güngören
- Neighbourhood
- Location in Turkey
- Coordinates: 36°13′N 32°38′E
- Country: Turkey
- Province: Mersin
- District: Anamur
- Elevation: 475 m (1,558 ft)
- Population (2022): 373
- Time zone: UTC+3 (TRT)
- Postal code: 33630
- Area code: 0324

Güngören (former Teniste) is a neighbourhood in the municipality and district of Anamur, Mersin Province, Turkey. Its population is 373 (2022). It is situated in the Toros Mountains. Its distance to Anamur is 35 kilometres (22 mi).
