= Anıtlı =

- Neighbourhood
- Location in Turkey
- Coordinates: 36°06′N 32°34′E
- Country: Turkey
- Province: Mersin
- District: Anamur
- Elevation: 35 m (115 ft)
- Population (2022): 566
- Time zone: UTC+3 (TRT)
- Postal code: 33630
- Area code: 0324

Anıtlı (formerly Kaledran or Kaliteran) is a neighbourhood in the municipality and district of Anamur, Mersin Province, Turkey. Its population is 566 (2022).

== Geography ==
Anıtlı lies on Turkish state highway D.400, which runs from west to east in southern Turkey, and is situated to the east of a creek named Kaledran. It is the westernmost point of Mersin Province. Yakacık, the former quarter of the village at the west of the creek is now in the neighbouring Antalya Province. However, although the two parts of the village are officially separated and renamed, the residents still prefer to use the name Kaledran for both parts. The distance to Anamur is 43 kilometres (27 mi) and the distance to Mersin is 267 kilometres (166 mi).

== Economy ==
Like many Mediterranean coastline villages, Anıtlı produces vegetables and fruits, especially bananas. Although the transportation facilities over the state highway are not adequate for an extensive tourism program, the village has natural beaches.
