= Sugözü, Anamur =

Sugözü
- Neighbourhood
- Location in Turkey
- Coordinates: 36°19′N 32°47′E
- Country: Turkey
- Province: Mersin
- District: Anamur
- Elevation: 640 m (2,100 ft)
- Population (2022): 125
- Time zone: UTC+3 (TRT)
- Area code: 0324

Sugözü is a neighbourhood in the municipality and district of Anamur, Mersin Province, Turkey. Its population is 125 (2022). It is situated in the Toros Mountains about 30 kilometres (19 mi) north of Anamur.
