= Ören, Mersin =

Ören
- Neighbourhood
- Location in Turkey
- Coordinates: 36°02′N 32°47′E
- Country: Turkey
- Province: Mersin
- District: Anamur
- Elevation: 25 m (82 ft)
- Population (2022): 4,450
- Time zone: UTC+3 (TRT)
- Area code: 0324

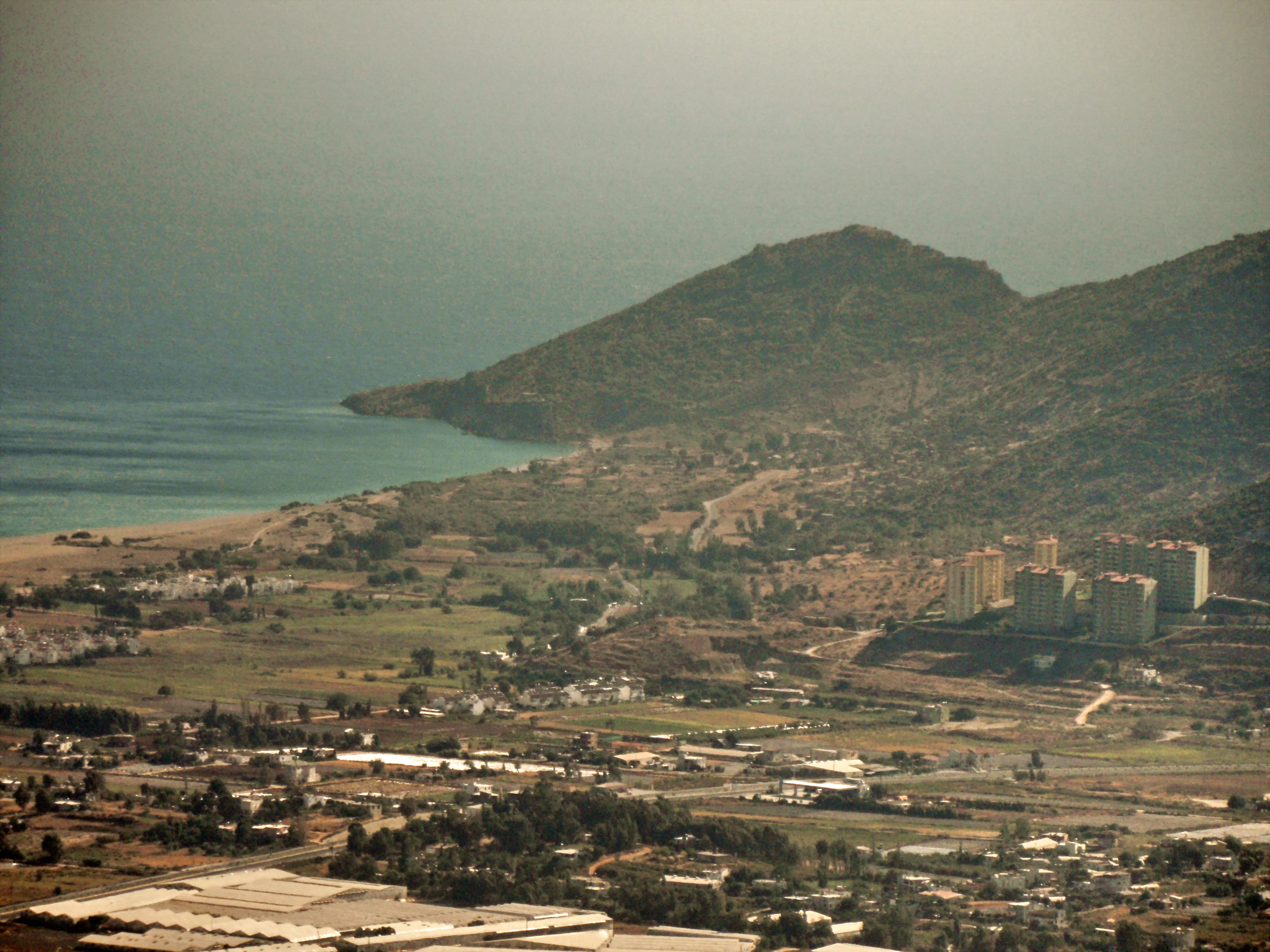
Panorama of Anamur, Turkey

Ören is a neighbourhood in the municipality and district of Anamur, Mersin Province, Turkey. Its population is 4,450 (2022). Before the 2013 reorganisation, it was a town (belde).

== Geography ==
Ören is one of the southernmost settlements of Anatolia. It is close to Anamur i.e., only 6 kilometres (3.7 mi) south west of Anamur. Distance to Mersin is 228 kilometres (142 mi).

== History ==
Ören is actually the former location of Anamur. It is founded by Phoenicians and occupied by Hittites. In the 12th century the town was briefly the capital of the Anemurium kingdom. In the 6th century BC it was a part of Achaemenid Empire of Persia and in 333 BC it was annexed by Alexander the Great of Macedodonia. Shortly after the Partition of Babylon in 323 BC it was incorporated into Seleucid Empire . During the last years of Seleucids, Ören was captured by pirates. Roman general Pompey defeated the pirates. After the town was annexed by the Roman Empire, it was several times captured by the Arabic Empire (Caliphate). In the 13th century Seljuk Turks and Karamanids captured the city. After 15th century the town became a part of Ottoman Empire. Beginning by Turkish domination, Anamur flourished as the main settlement of the area. But Ören continued as a village and was renamed Ören (meaning ruins) referring to ruins of ancient Anemurium. In 1992 the village was declared township.

== Economy ==
The most important agricultural products of Ören are banana, strawberry and peanut. Far from urban sprawl, beach tourism is also promising.
