= Anemurium =

Ancient city ruins

Coordinates: 36°01′27.37″N 32°48′09.36″E

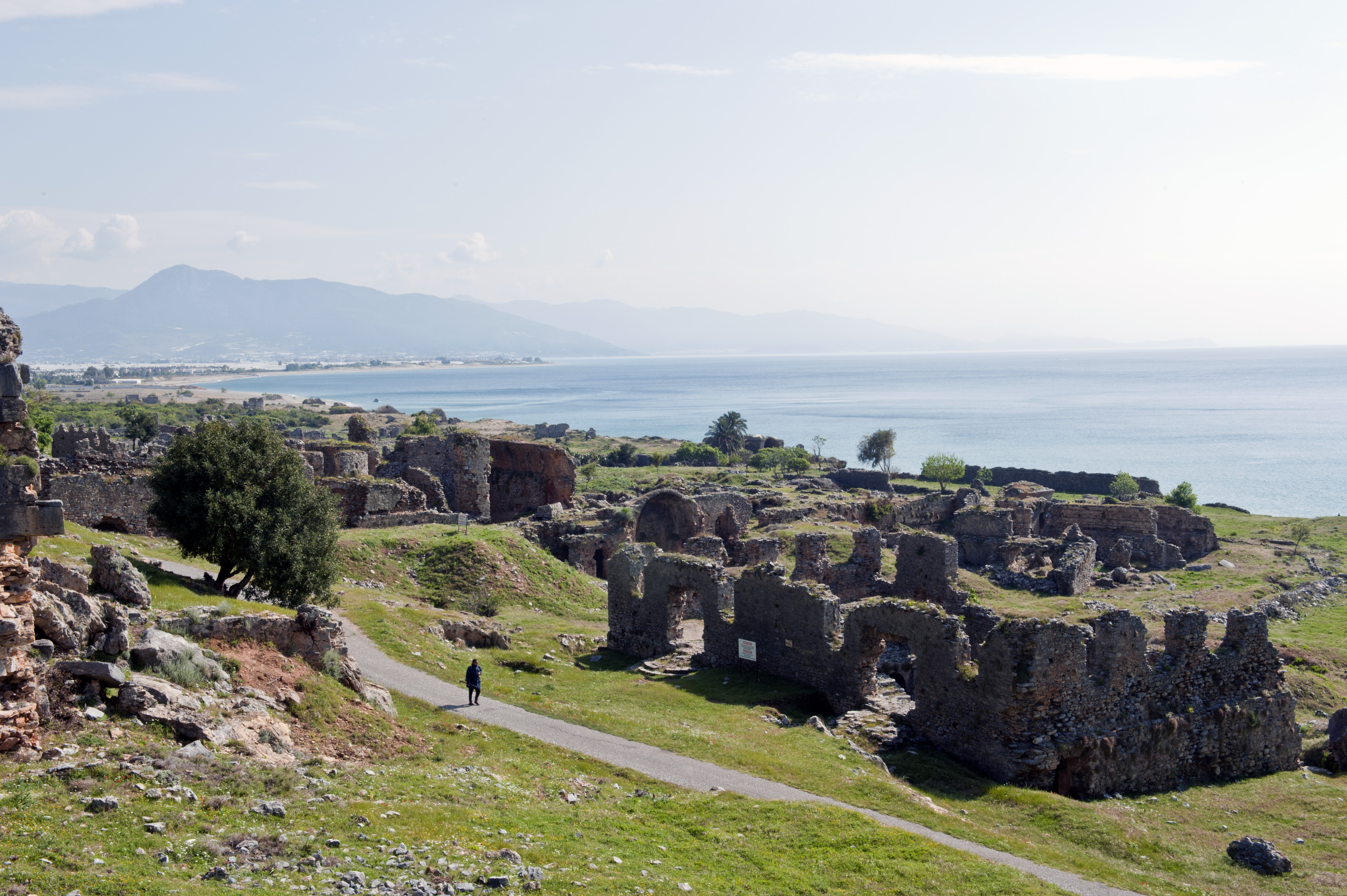

Anemurium (Ancient Greek: Ἀνεμούριον, romanized: Anemourion), also called Animurium, is an ancient city whose ruins, now called Eski Anamur or Anemuryum, are close to the modern Turkish city of Anamur. It was in the Roman province of Cilicia, later Isauria, and was situated near a high promontory (Cape Anamur) that marks the southernmost point of Asia Minor, only 64 km from Cyprus. In the Middle Ages, it was called Stallimur.

== History ==
In the Periplus of Pseudo-Scylax, Anemurium is described as a cape with a city.

Antiochus III the Great moved past Anemurium during his campaign along the southern coast of Asia Minor circa 197 BC.

In AD 52, it was besieged by a local tribe, known as the Clietae, led by Troxobor, but Antiochus IV of Commagene broke the siege and after executing Troxobor and a few of the leading chieftains, pardoned the rest. It was under threat from a similar quarter in 382. Coins from its mint survive from the time of Antiochus IV of Commagene (38–72) to Valerian (253–259). In 260, it was captured by the Sasanians, an event that sent Anemurium into decline for many decades, but it recovered to some degree in the fourth century until the mid-7th century when it was more or less completely abandoned, probably because the Arab occupation of Cyprus made the coast unsafe.

== Bishopric ==
Iacobus, bishop of Anemurium, took part in the Council of Chalcedon in 451. Euphronius was a signatory of the letter by which the bishops of the Roman province of Isauria, to which Anemurium belonged, protested to Byzantine Emperor Leo I the Thracian in 458 about the killing of Proterius of Alexandria. Ioannes was deposed by the Emperor Justin I in 518 for supporting the views of Severus of Antioch. Mamas was at the Trullan Council of 692.

No longer a residential bishopric, Anemurium is today listed by the Catholic Church as a titular see.

== Remains ==
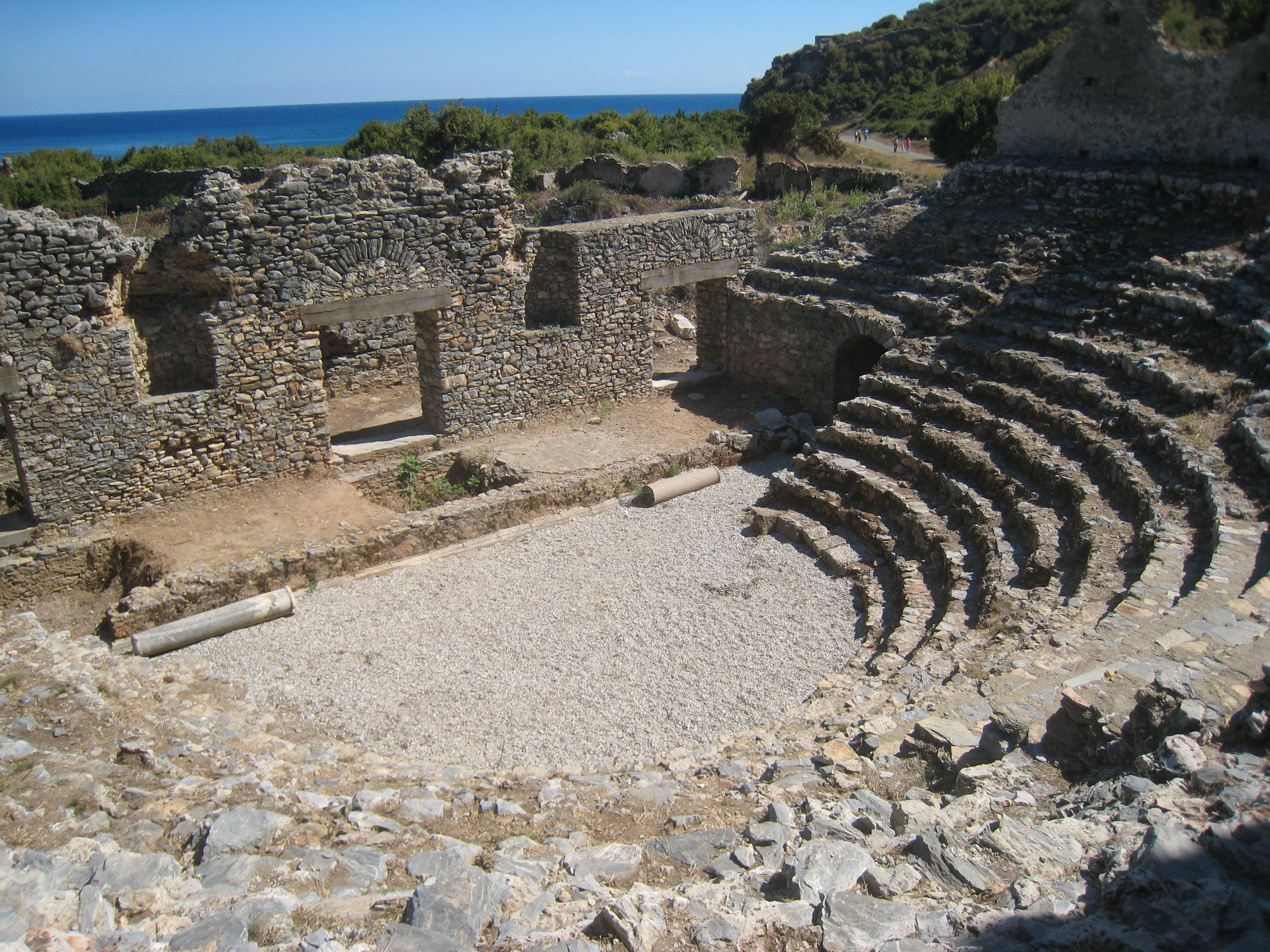

The ruins of Anemurium were mentioned by Francis Beaufort, an English naval captain who explored the south coast of Turkey in 1811-12 and who published his discoveries in Karamania. Excavations were directed by Elizabeth Alfoldi, University of Toronto (1965–1970), and subsequently James Russell, University of British Columbia, along with Hector Williams and his wife Caroline.

The upper city or acropolis occupies the actual cape, and is described in the Princeton Encyclopedia of Classical Sites as protected on three sides by steep cliffs and on the landward side by a wall with towers and zigzag reentrants. These fortifications and the building inside were constructed in medieval times, in part utilizing Hellenistic elements. The lower town to the north of the citadel extended for at least 1500 m to an area now covered with sand dunes and with a width of 400 m between the eastern seawall and an aqueduct on the west.

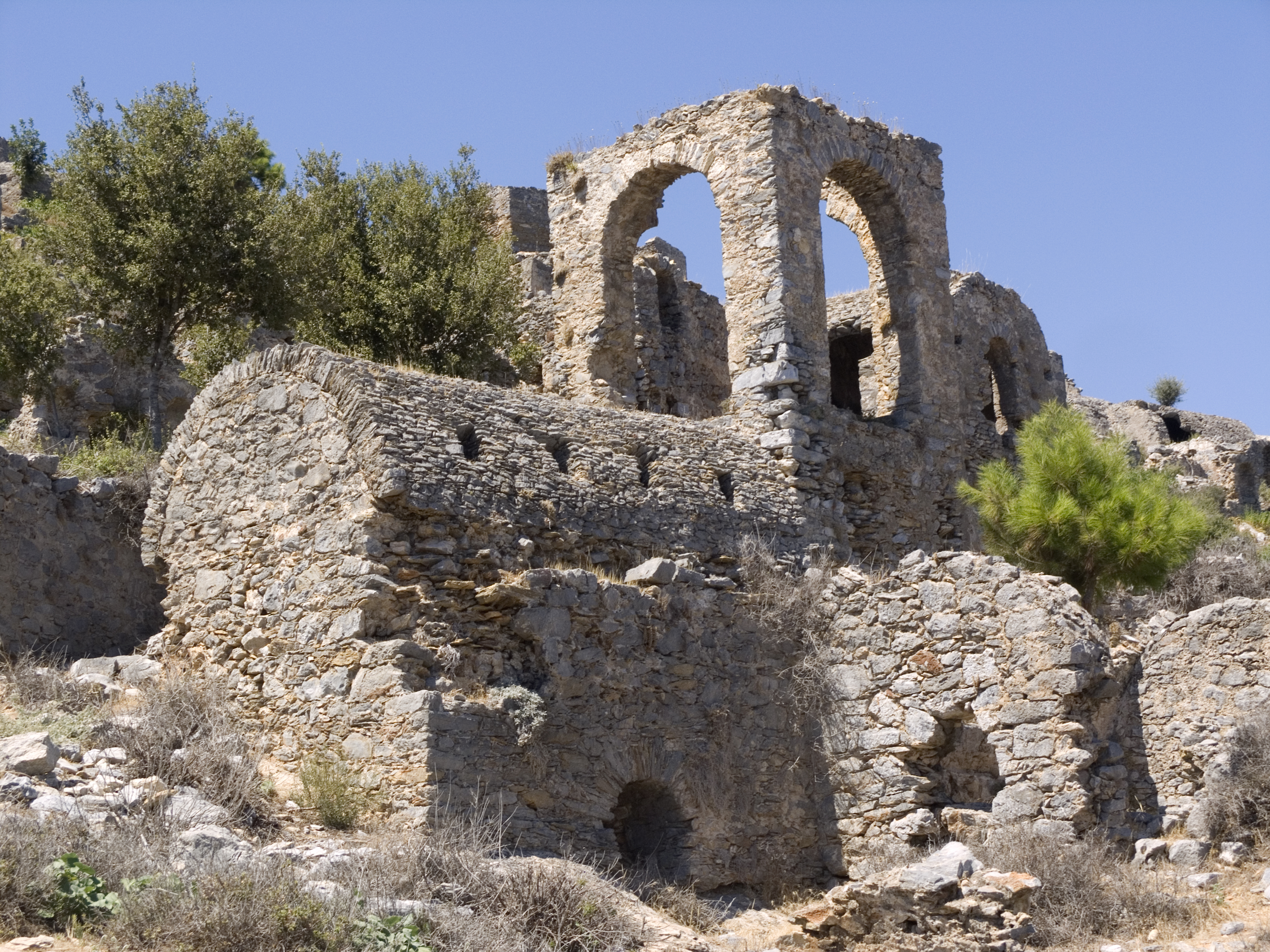

The discovered remains include a large theatre, a small covered odeon or bouleuterion, three large public baths and one small one, decorated with mosaic floors (some converted to industrial use in late antiquity), four early Christian churches (some with mosaic floors, mostly geometric, and donors' inscriptions), and an exedra possibly of a civil basilica (law court).

Outside, there is an extensive necropolis of some 350 sepulchral monuments dating from the 1st to the early 4th century. Some included several rooms, a second storey, and even an inner courtyard. Some were decorated with mosaics and wall paintings, including one (BI16) representing the four seasons and a dining couple.

Nearby to the east at the other end of the coastal plain Mamure Castle, built by the Armenian Kingdom of Cilicia (Little Armenia), was taken over by the Turks in 1221. The first volume of the publication of the Canadian excavations appeared in August 2021 under the name of James Russell who directed the excavations at the site. It presents the four churches, the theatre and odeion, the largest painted tomb, and an inscription (Editions Mergoil, 39 euros).

In 2024, a Greek inscription has been discovered which was carved onto a base that most likely originally housed a statue. The inscription celebrates the victory of the wrestler Kaikilianos in the adult category of a wrestling tournament organised every five years by a local named Flavianus. An earlier inscription of a statue bracket from the colonnaded street commemorated another local athlete, a periodonikes, who had won prizes in many panhellenic games; it was published by James Russell in Phoenix.
