= Anamur =

Secondary municipality in Mersin, Turkey

- District and municipality
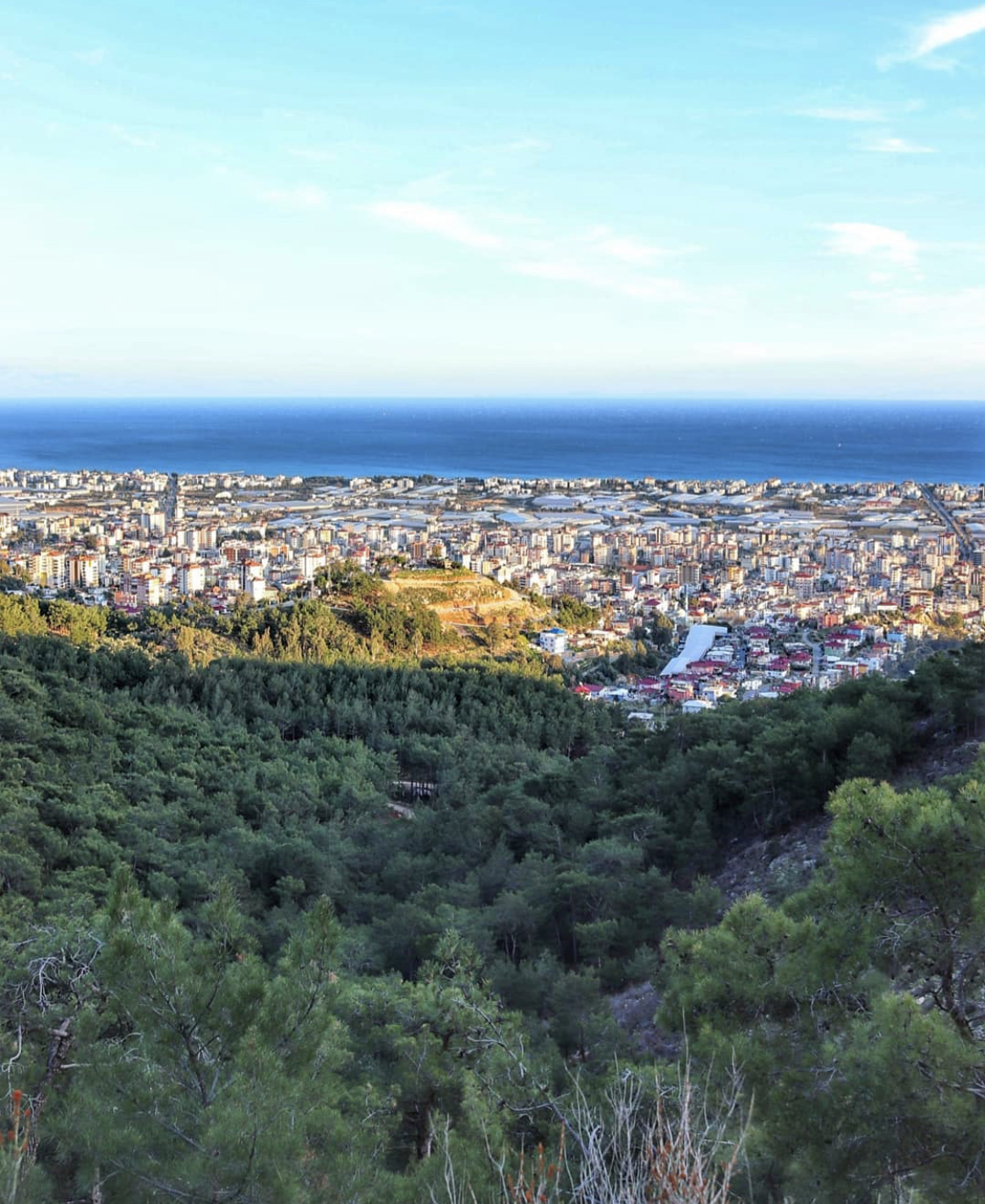
- General view of Anamur

- Logo

- Map showing Anamur District in Mersin Province

- Location within Turkey
- Coordinates: 36°04′48″N 32°49′52″E
- Country: Turkey
- Province: Mersin

Government
  - Mayor: Durmuş Deniz (CHP)
- Area: 1,430 km^{2} (550 sq mi)
- Population (2022): 66,846
  - Density: 46.7/km^{2} (121/sq mi)
- Time zone: UTC+3 (TRT)
- Area code: 0324
- Website: www.anamur.bel.tr

Anamur is a municipality and district of Mersin Province, Turkey. Its area is 1,430 km^{2}, and its population is 66,851 (2022). It is the westernmost district of that province, bordering on Antalya Province. Anamur contains Anatolia's southernmost point, It is a coastal resort known for its bananas and peanuts.

== Etymology ==
Anamur has mutated from the Ancient Greek "Anemourion" (Ἀνεμούριον), Latinized as "Anemurium", meaning "windmill".

== History ==
Anemurium was in an area dominated by the Hittites and the Assyrians.

=== Late Bronze ===
During the Hittite period in the twelfth century BC, the ruler Tuthalia IV, granted Anemurium to Mattuvata who had taken refuge in his kingdom. Mattuvata took advantage of the Hittites’ weakness, establishing his own kingdom with Anemurium as its capital. His rule extended as far as Afyon, in central Anatolia.

=== Iron Age ===
At the end of the twelfth century the area was occupied by a nomadic tribe that had come from across the Caucasus mountains. The tribe was called by the ancient Greeks the "Wind people" (Ἀνέμου γένος) after whom the city was named. The exact reasons behind this name are lost in time. The most probable explanation however, is that they worshiped a god of wind, perhaps similar to the Greek Aeolus, as their main deity. Then the city came under the control of the Phoenicians, and later Persians. In 333 BC Alexander the Great brought this coast within his Macedonian Empire, and he was succeeded by Seleucids and then Ancient Romans. The coast was given by Mark Anthony to Cleopatra as a wedding present and Roman coins have been discovered in the course of excavation, dating to the years between Emperors Titus (AD 79–81) and Valerian (AD 253–259). The Romans were succeeded by the Byzantines.

The city was first occupied by an Islamic Army in the time of Umar ibn al-Khattab.

In XI - XIII centuries it was a part of Cilician Kingdom.

Turkish people reached the city in the eleventh and twelfth centuries. In the thirteenth century, the Karamanids, a Turkish clan in Central Anatolia, expanded their borders towards the city, building the Alaköprü bridge (which can still be seen on the road to Ankara) and conquering the city in 1290 from Cilicia Armenians. It was also ruled by the Seljuk Turkish Sultanate of Rum between 1075 and 1099 and again between 1228 and 1246.

== Climate ==
Anamur has a hot-summer Mediterranean climate (Köppen climate classification Csa) with long, hot and dry summers and cool and rainy winters.

Climate data for Anamur (1991–2020)
Month	Jan	Feb	Mar	Apr	May	Jun	Jul	Aug	Sep	Oct	Nov	Dec	Year
Mean daily maximum °C (°F)	15.9 (60.6)	16.4 (61.5)	18.8 (65.8)	21.6 (70.9)	25.7 (78.3)	30.0 (86.0)	33.2 (91.8)	33.7 (92.7)	31.4 (88.5)	27.6 (81.7)	22.3 (72.1)	17.7 (63.9)	24.6 (76.3)
Daily mean °C (°F)	11.7 (53.1)	12.1 (53.8)	14.3 (57.7)	17.1 (62.8)	21.0 (69.8)	25.1 (77.2)	28.4 (83.1)	29.0 (84.2)	26.3 (79.3)	22.4 (72.3)	17.4 (63.3)	13.4 (56.1)	19.9 (67.8)
Mean daily minimum °C (°F)	8.5 (47.3)	8.6 (47.5)	10.3 (50.5)	12.9 (55.2)	16.8 (62.2)	20.7 (69.3)	24.1 (75.4)	24.5 (76.1)	21.6 (70.9)	18.1 (64.6)	13.7 (56.7)	10.1 (50.2)	15.9 (60.6)
Average precipitation mm (inches)	192.0 (7.56)	135.6 (5.34)	82.0 (3.23)	45.8 (1.80)	28.2 (1.11)	3.5 (0.14)	0.8 (0.03)	1.2 (0.05)	13.0 (0.51)	56.3 (2.22)	135.4 (5.33)	208.7 (8.22)	902.5 (35.53)
Average precipitation days (≥ 1.0 mm)	11.4	8.9	7.0	4.6	3.0	1.2	1.3	1.0	2.1	4.6	5.9	10.5	61.5
Average relative humidity (%)	68.3	66.2	66.8	70.3	72.2	72.3	70.3	69.2	63.6	61.3	62.6	68.0	67.6
Mean monthly sunshine hours	139.9	159.5	215.1	246.7	280.3	303.4	317.8	313.7	285.3	239.0	178.5	135.5	2,814.7
Source: NCEI

Climate data for Anamur
Month	Jan	Feb	Mar	Apr	May	Jun	Jul	Aug	Sep	Oct	Nov	Dec	Year
Record high °C (°F)	21.5 (70.7)	23.2 (73.8)	26.4 (79.5)	31.2 (88.2)	37.0 (98.6)	41.0 (105.8)	42.0 (107.6)	40.0 (104.0)	38.2 (100.8)	34.6 (94.3)	30.3 (86.5)	25.9 (78.6)	42.0 (107.6)
Mean daily maximum °C (°F)	15.7 (60.3)	15.9 (60.6)	18.2 (64.8)	21.4 (70.5)	25.3 (77.5)	29.6 (85.3)	32.8 (91.0)	33.0 (91.4)	30.9 (87.6)	26.9 (80.4)	21.6 (70.9)	17.3 (63.1)	24.1 (75.3)
Mean daily minimum °C (°F)	8.1 (46.6)	8.1 (46.6)	9.6 (49.3)	12.3 (54.1)	15.8 (60.4)	19.8 (67.6)	23.0 (73.4)	23.0 (73.4)	20.1 (68.2)	16.8 (62.2)	12.8 (55.0)	9.6 (49.3)	14.9 (58.8)
Record low °C (°F)	0.3 (32.5)	−0.8 (30.6)	−0.7 (30.7)	3.6 (38.5)	8.6 (47.5)	12.2 (54.0)	16.2 (61.2)	15.8 (60.4)	10.8 (51.4)	8.2 (46.8)	2.3 (36.1)	1.2 (34.2)	−0.8 (30.6)
Average precipitation mm (inches)	186.0 (7.32)	140.9 (5.55)	87.7 (3.45)	52.7 (2.07)	22.6 (0.89)	5.6 (0.22)	0.9 (0.04)	3.7 (0.15)	13.7 (0.54)	72.6 (2.86)	138.1 (5.44)	199.4 (7.85)	923.9 (36.38)
Average rainy days	13.2	11.5	9.5	7.4	4.1	1.9	1.0	1.1	2.5	5.5	8.4	12.5	78.6
Average relative humidity (%)	68.3	66.2	66.8	70.3	72.2	73.3	70.3	69.2	63.6	61.3	62.6	68	67.7
Mean monthly sunshine hours	145.7	154	213.9	246	303.8	327	344.1	337.9	306	251.1	192	145.7	2,967.2
Source 1: Devlet Meteoroloji İşleri Genel Müdürlüğü
Source 2: NCEI(humidity 1991-2020)

== Anamur today ==
The local economy depends on agriculture, especially bananas and strawberries. The summers are hot and this is the only part of Turkey that can sustain the growing of bananas. Greenhouses for growing bananas are found everywhere; other tropical fruits such as papaya, pineapple and avocado are grown here now too. Anamur produces 40% of Turkey's strawberries. A traditional local specialty is taro (known locally as gölevez).

Although there are places of historical interest, long beaches and a clean sea, there is no large scale tourism on this part of the coast, as the coast road in both directions is winding and really slow to drive. But there are major road works now into the direction of Mersin and Antalya. Many kilometers have four lanes now. It takes 5 hours to get here by bus from either Mersin or Antalya. Gazipasa Airport (near Alanya) opened in mid-2011 with Direct charter flights from Amsterdam (Netherlands) take place twice a week. German airliners will fly to this airport in 2012. There are other airports in Antalya and Adana. Although some people from central Anatolia as well as foreigners from Europe (Germans/Austrians/Dutch) have holiday homes here, Anamur itself is a quiet, isolated town with no night life, and in winter is very quiet. Anamur Iskele is a beach resort in this area. A lot of holiday flats and villa's are situated near the beach or more inland. Plenty of small and some bigger hotels offer good quality as well as the restaurants near the small boulevard. The beaches are important nesting grounds for the sea turtle caretta caretta and the rocky areas of coastline are inhabited by the Mediterranean monk seal. The Turkish military has a base on the coast. The island of Cyprus is a way offshore and there are no sea crossings to Kyrenia/Girne anymore. The Taşucu Ferryboat companies blocked it. Now Taşucu, 2 hours east from Anamur by car, is the closest ferry terminal offering ferry service to Cyprus. The silhouette of the island of Cyprus is visible if there is no sea fog. It is just 40 miles away from Anamur.

== Sites to visit ==
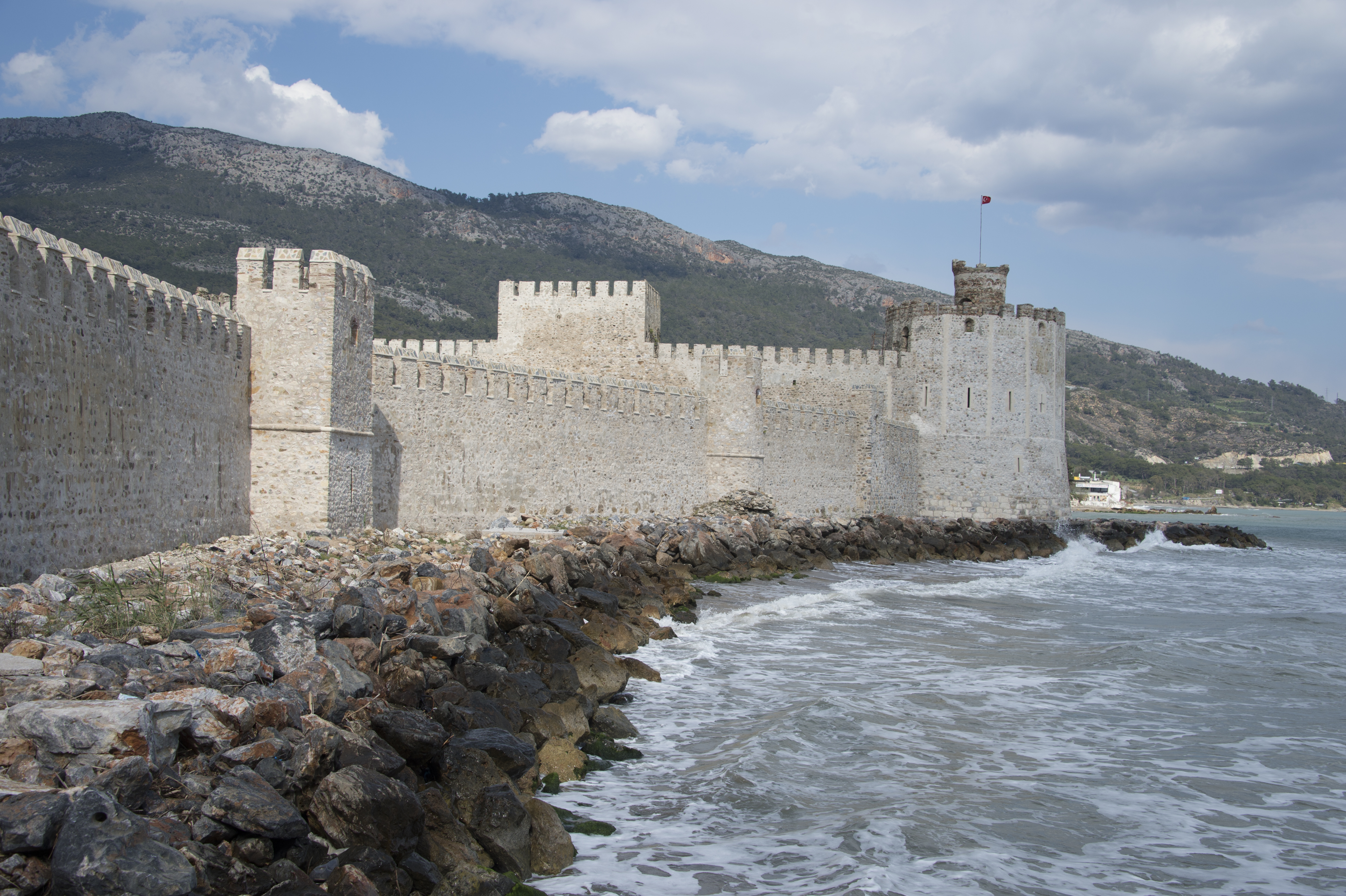
Mamure, the old Crusader castle.

- Mamure Castle, the medieval castle, well-preserved, about 7 km (4 mi) south east of Anamur. Originally built by the Romans in the third or fourth century AD, it was enlarged by the Byzantine Empire and the Crusaders. After the Seljuk Turkish Sultan Alaeddin Kayqubad captured the castle in 1221, he had it rebuilt in its present form. It consists of three courtyards with 39 towers, surrounded by a moat. In one courtyard there is an ancient mosque with a minaret – built by Mahmud Bey of Karaman in 1300-1308 – which is still open for prayer. There are the ruins of a bathhouse on the opposite side. The castle is in two sections with two lines of ramparts between them, a walkway along the ramparts links the two sides.
- Anemurium, the remains of the ancient city, built between c. 100 BC and AD 600 6 km (4 mi) southwest of Anamur, on the coast. The stone walls of the city are still partly intact and there are many mosaics. The small theatre or odeion is still largely intact across from the more poorly preserved large theatre and there are several bath buildings. Enough left of the city's two-storey Roman bathhouse to give a good impression of what it was in its heyday, with changing rooms, a hot section, a warm section, and a hall with a pool. On the entrance gate a sign written Latin says “Welcome to the baths, have a good bath.” The city had an elaborate water supply system, as illustrated by the remains of the aqueducts. There is also an acropolis containing the ruins of a palace, which had its own private water supply. Around the city walls there are many Roman built tombs, which even have small entrance halls for visitors. The site has been excavated by Canadian teams from the University of Toronto and the University of British Columbia.
- Many caves including Çukurpınar, one of the longest in the world, (1420 m) and Köşekbükü (the air is said to be treatment for asthma or malaria).

== Composition ==
There are 56 neighbourhoods in Anamur District:

- Akarca
- Akdeniz
- Akine
- Alataş
- Anıtlı
- Aşağıkükür
- Bahçe
- Bahçelievler
- Boğuntu
- Bozdoğan
- Çaltıbükü
- Çamlıpınar
- Çamlıpınaralanı
- Çarıklar
- Çataloluk
- Çeltikçi
- Çukurabanoz
- Demirören
- Emirşah
- Esentepe
- Evciler
- Fatih
- Gercebahşiş
- Göktaş
- Güleç
- Güneybahşiş
- Güngören
- Güzelyurt
- İskele
- Kalınören
- Karaağa
- Karaçukur
- Karadere
- Karalarbahşiş
- Kaşdişlen
- Kılıç
- Kızılaliler
- Köprübaşı
- Korucuk
- Kükür
- Lale
- Malaklar
- Ören
- Ormancık
- Ovabaşı
- Sağlık
- Saray
- Sarıağaç
- Sarıdana
- Sugözü
- Sultan Alaattin
- Toroslar
- Uçarı
- Yalıevleri
- Yeşilyurt
- Yıldırımbeyazıt

== Twin towns and sister cities ==
- Bingen am Rhein, Germany
- Girne, Northern Cyprus
- Mingachevir, Azerbaijan
- Konjic, Bosnia and Herzegovina

== See also ==
- Northern Cyprus Water Supply Project
