= Minthis Villages =

- Tourism/heritage grouping of villages
- Location within Cyprus
- Coordinates: 34°49′31.16″N 32°29′40.55″E
- Country: Cyprus
- District: Paphos District
- Cultural/landscape anchor: Stavros tis Minthis Monastery
- Constituents: Episkopi; Kallepeia; Tsada
- Time zone: UTC+2 (EET)
  - Summer (DST): UTC+3 (EEST)

Minthis Villages (also: Villages of Minthi) is a local tourism and heritage grouping of three neighbouring communities in the Paphos District of Cyprus: Episkopi, Kallepeia and Tsada. The grouping is centered on the uplands and the Ezousa valley around the historic monastery of Stavros tis Minthis.

== Geography ==
The three villages occupy a breezy plateau and the upper Ezousa valley north-east of the city of Paphos. Episkopi lies on the west side of the valley, Kallepeia to the east among vineyards, and Tsada on the higher ground between them.

== Constituents ==
- Episkopi – valley-side village noted for the “Episkopi Rock” landmark and the nearby Sindi Monastery.
- Kallepeia – wine-country village of stone houses and chapels, with the ruined chapel of Saint Gennadios at the abandoned locality of Moro Nero.
- Tsada – the functional hub of the plateau and closest to the Minthis monastery/resort complex; main parish church is Panagia Chryseleousa.

== History ==
A defining event in the modern era was the 1953 Paphos earthquake, which caused heavy damage across the district. In its aftermath:

- At Tsada, the original (1910) church of Panagia Chryseleousa was “severely destroyed” by the 1953 quake; a new church was agreed in 1955 near the existing one.
- At Kallepeia, after structural failure in 1943, reconstruction of the main church (Agios Georgios) began in 1955; the community also lists the chapel of Agios Gennadios at Moro Nero among its monuments.

== Trails and landscape ==
The area promotes signed nature routes linking the three villages. A Cyprus Ministry of Interior strategy document records two local “nature study trails”, including **Kallepeia – (abandoned settlement) Moro Nero – Episkopi**, and notes that the European long-distance path E4 passes via Episkopi and Tsada. Additional circular walks on “Minthis hill” are published by trail directories and the regional tourism board.

== Economy and tourism ==
The uplands around the monastery host the Minthis resort (golf, wellness and hospitality), which markets the area’s vineyards and hill-country setting and takes its name from the monastery complex.

== See also ==
- Ezousa River
- Moro Nero
