= Ezousa Valley =

Valley in Cyprus

- Location within Cyprus

Geology
- Type: Fluvial valley (limestone and mélange)

Geography
- Location: Paphos District, Cyprus
- Coordinates: 34.792°N 32.523°E
- River: Ezousa River
- Interactive map of Ezousa Valley

The Ezousa Valley (Greek: Κοιλάδα Έζουσας) is a river valley in the Paphos District of Cyprus, centered on the middle and lower course of the Ezousa River. Owing to its geological cliffs, riparian habitats and birdlife, significant sections are protected under the Natura 2000 network and recognised as an Important Bird Area (IBA). The valley’s visitor gateway is the Episkopi Environmental Information Centre in Episkopi, which presents the area’s geology, flora and fauna and serves as the trailhead for a circular walking route.

== Geography ==
The valley lies northeast of the city of Paphos. The Ezousa flows south from the Troodos foothills, cutting a steep-sided corridor before emerging onto the coastal plain. Settlements in the middle valley include Episkopi, Kallepeia and Tsada. A signed circular path—the Ezousa Walking Trail (7.6 km—begins and ends at the information centre in Episkopi.

== Geology and landforms ==
A prominent landmark is the Episkopi Rock, a monolithic cliff feature (approx. 70 m high, 250 m long) attributed to the Mamonia geological complex and listed as a protected landscape. Chasmophytic plants occupy its fissures and ledges; these include local occurrences of Verbascum levanticum and Wall Pennywort (Umbilicus rupestris); populations of Bosea cypria are recorded at the base. The site also supports raptors such as the peregrine falcon (Falco peregrinus).

== Ecology and protection ==
Large parts of the valley and its adjoining cliffs are designated as Natura 2000 Special Protection Areas (SPAs): Koilada Ezousas (site code CY4000021) and Kremmoi Ezousas (CY4000022). Official standard data forms list qualifying bird species and site boundaries. The valley is also identified by BirdLife International as the IBA **“Ezousa Valley and Cliffs”**, important for species including Griffon vulture (Gyps fulvus) and Bonelli's eagle (Aquila fasciata).

== Recreation ==
Waymarked routes traverse the valley, including the Ezousa circular walk at Episkopi and trails linking nearby uplands. The Cypriot section of the long-distance E4 path passes through the wider area, descending from Tsada via the Minthis uplands to Episkopi and continuing along the river corridor towards the coast.

== Hydrology ==
Upstream in the Ezousa watershed, the river is impounded by the Kannaviou Dam (completed mid-2000s), an element of regional water-supply and irrigation infrastructure.

== See also ==
- Ezousa River
- Episkopi, Paphos
- Minthis Villages
- Kannaviou Dam
