= Lemona, Cyprus =

Lemona Λεμώνα
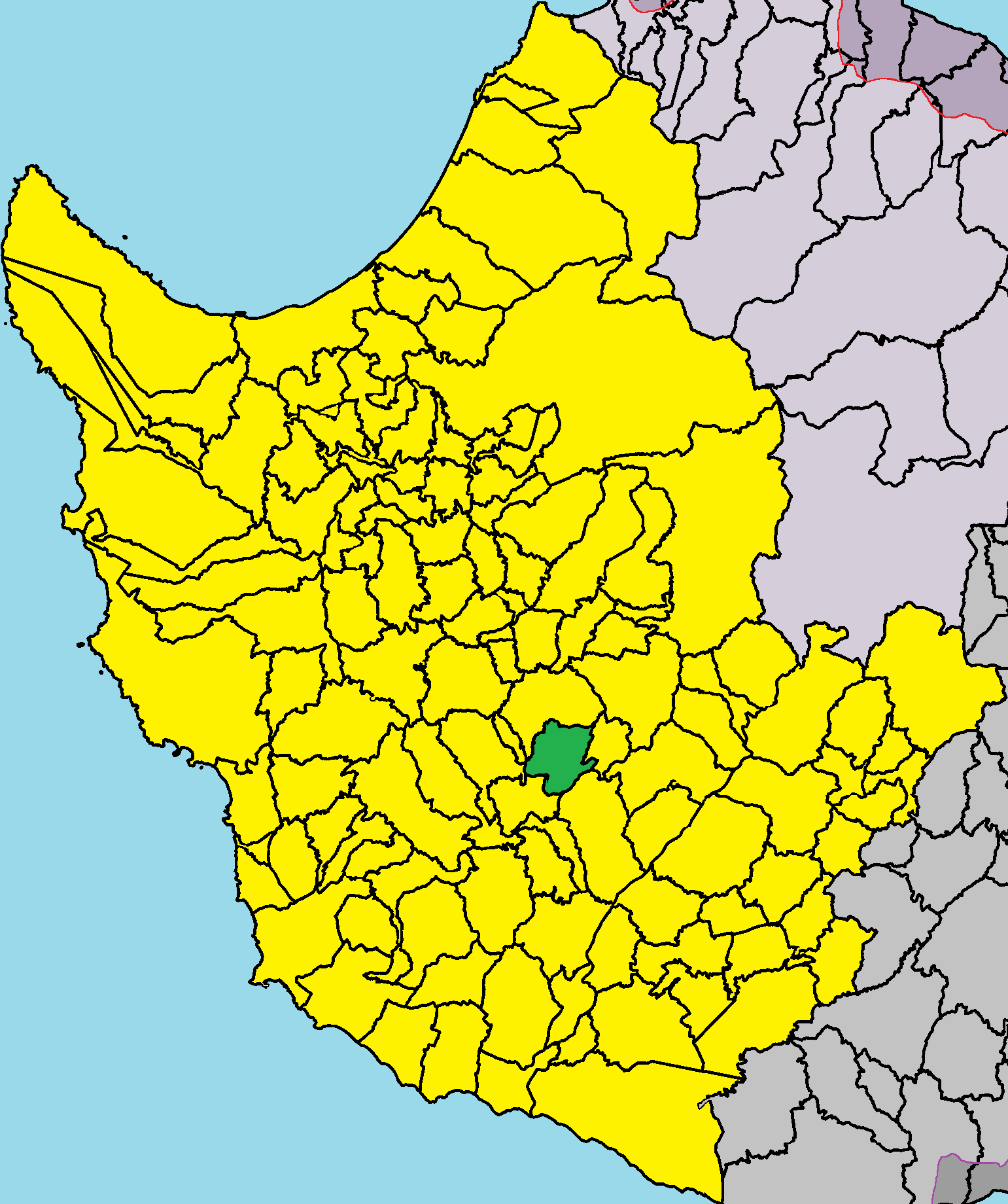
- Lemona, Cyprus in Paphos District.

- Location in Cyprus
- Coordinates: 34°51′47″N 32°33′26″E
- Country: Cyprus
- District: Paphos District
- Elevation: 308 m (1,010 ft)

Population (2001)
  - Total: 59
- Time zone: UTC+2 (EET)
  - Summer (DST): UTC+3 (EEST)
- Postal code: 6128

Lemona (Greek: Λεμώνα) is a village in the Paphos District of Cyprus, located about 25 km northeast of the town of Paphos and 7 km west of Agios Fotios.

It may have taken its name at old times from many stagnant waters (Greek: λιμιώνας) that existed in the area or from many lemon trees in the area (Greek: λεμονιές). The main occupation of the former inhabitants was agriculture. The village school closed in 1987. Lemona has an altitude of 308 metres (1,010 ft). Lemona Village is close to Choulou, Kourdaka and Letymvou villages.

Built at an elevation of 300 and watered by the river Ezousa, the Lemona village of about 50 inhabitants constitutes an impasse, as the road from there does not lead to another village. In addition the settlement is a hunting site during the hunting season.
