= Kourtaka =

Kourtaka Κούρτακα Kurtağa
- Location in Cyprus
- Coordinates: 34°51′3″N 32°31′59″E
- Country: Cyprus
- District: Paphos District
- Elevation: 380 m (1,250 ft)

Population (2001)
  - Total: 0
- Time zone: UTC+2 (EET)
  - Summer (DST): UTC+3 (EEST)
- Postal code: 6127

Kourtaka or Kourdaka (Greek: Κούρτακα, Turkish: Kurtağa) is an abandoned Turkish Cypriot village in the Paphos District of Cyprus, located 8 km west of Ayios Photios. A settlement between Choulou and Letymvou, Kourdaka is a rare case of a community that has overcome desertion and abandonment, and instead, it has gained new life since 2012 with newcomers who have chosen to live in the area.

Historically, this small mountain village of Pafos, under the Frankish and Venetian domination, was a royal fief that changed hands, was gifted or leased among royal families and feudal lords of the time. Although it was mainly a Greek village, during the Ottoman domination, and more specifically in the 17th-18th century, its population changed its faith and were turned into Muslims, something confirmed by censuses during the British domination of the island.

== Topography ==
Kourtaka is located 380 m above sea level. Lemona is located 1.5 km away.
