= Aetokremmos =

- Locality
- Locality in Kili
- Coordinates: 34°51′07″N 32°26′40″E
- Country: Cyprus
- District: Paphos District
- Elevation: 538 m (1,765 ft)
- Highest elevation: 626 m (2,054 ft)
- Time zone: UTC+2 (EET)
  - Summer (DST): UTC+3 (EEST)

Aetokremmos is a Locality in Kili Village, Cyprus and is situated 538 metres above sea level. Its peak is around 626 metres. Melissovounos is located 1.2 km away and Asprovounos 2.5 km away.
