= Makrona Mountain =

Makrona
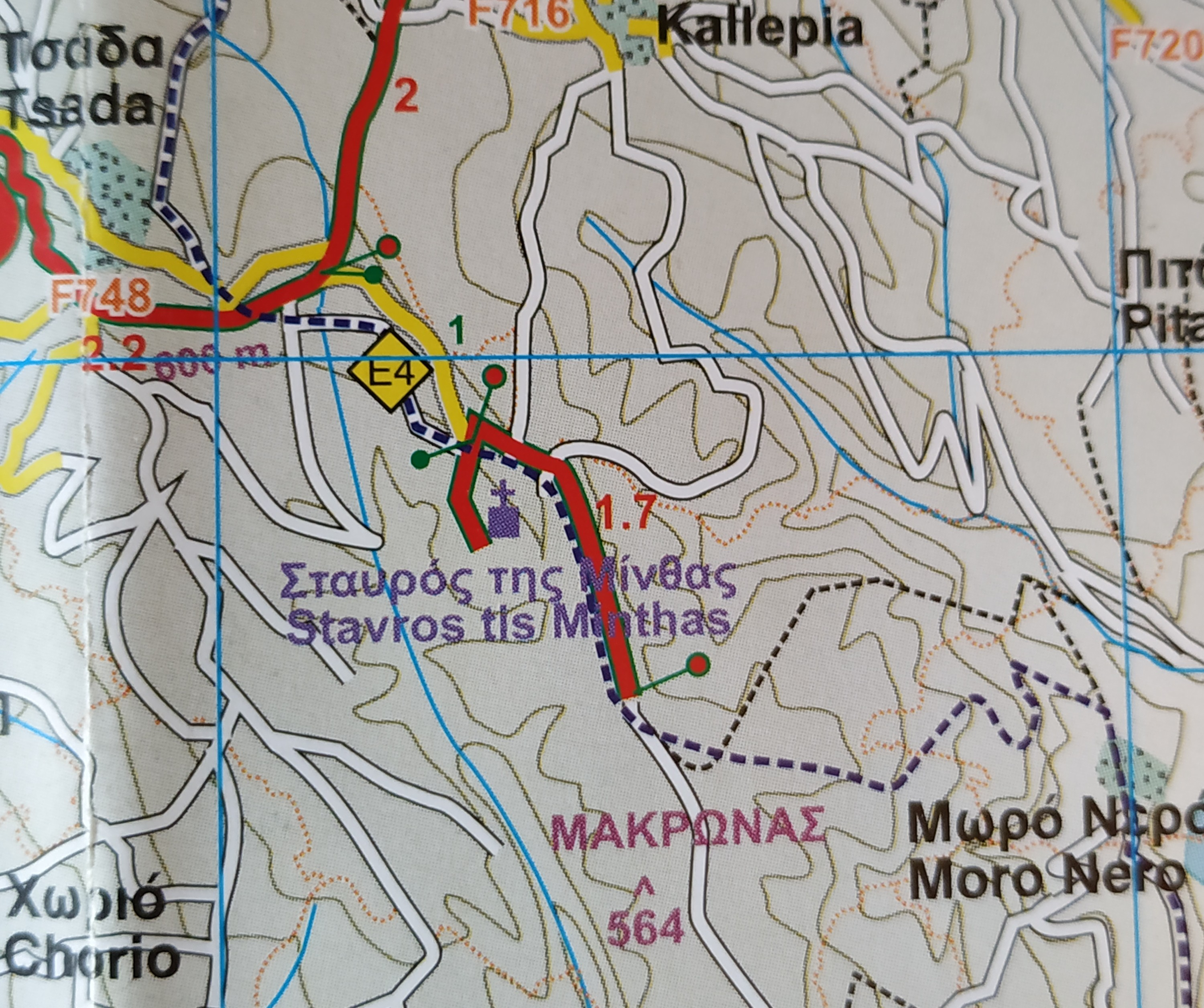
- Location of Makrona
- Nickname: Makronas
- Mountain in Tsada
- Coordinates: 34°48′41″N 32°30′08″E
- Country: Cyprus
- District: Paphos District
- Elevation: 560 m (1,840 ft)
- Highest elevation: 565 m (1,854 ft)
- Time zone: UTC+2 (EET)
  - Summer (DST): UTC+3 (EEST)

Makrona is a mountain in Tsada in the Paphos District of Cyprus. Is located at 564 m above sea level. Titsiros is only 1.4 km away and Agrioelia at 2.6 km away. The nearest larger city is Pafos, 8.1 km southwest of Makrona. The area around the Makrona consists mostly of agricultural land. The average rainfall here is 573 mm annually. January is the wettest month. August is the driest with only 2 mm.
