= Chrysochou (river) =

River in Cyprus

Coordinates: 35°03′N 32°25′E

The Chrysochou is a river of Paphos District in western Cyprus. It flows through the Paphos Forest and village of Goudi. One of its tributaries is the Stavros tis Psokas. The main aquifers of the basin are The Terra and Koronia Limestones, The Gypsum, The Coastal Plain, and The Alluvial.
