= Choli, Cyprus =

Choli Χόλη
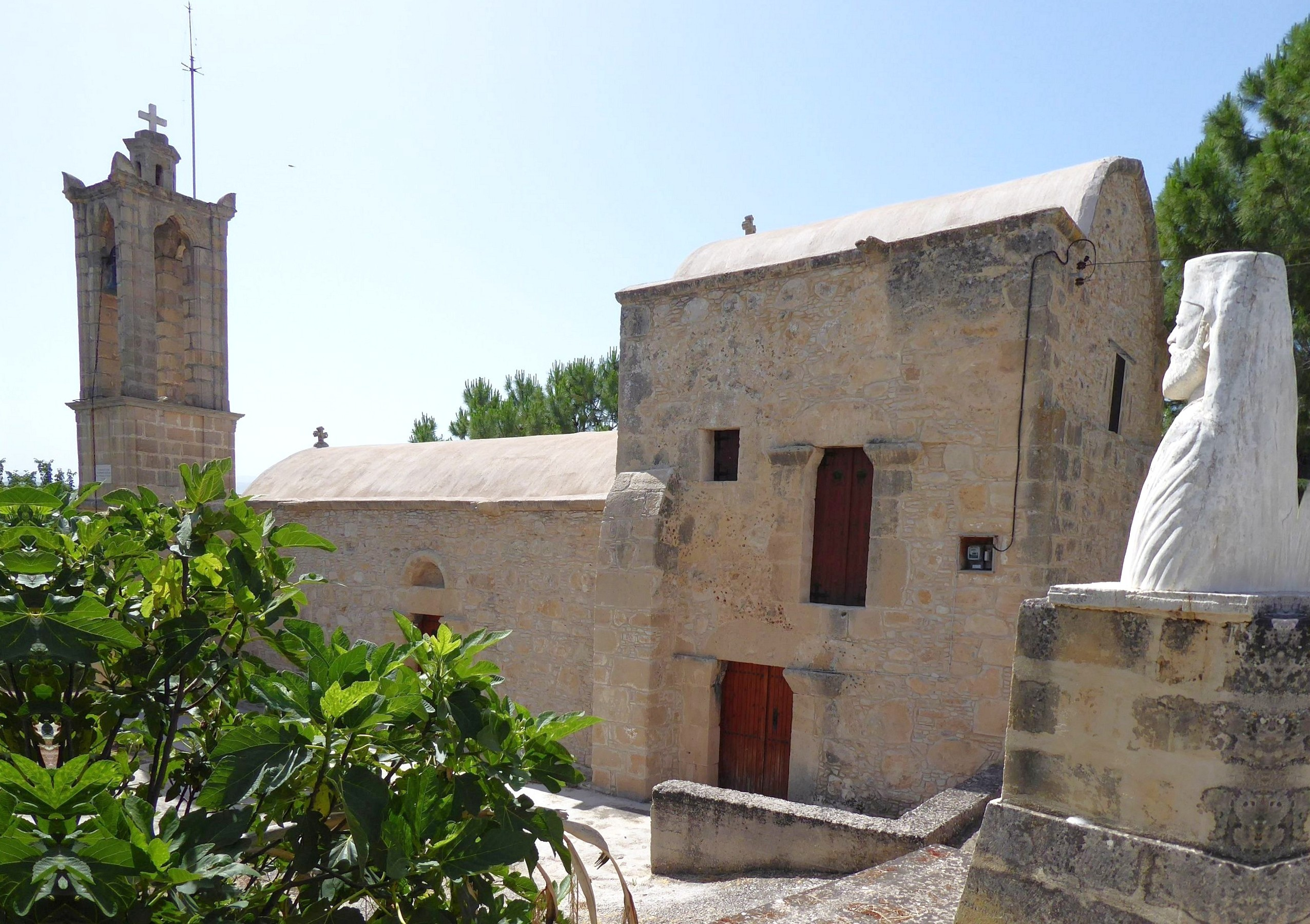
- Church of Archangel Michael

- Location in Cyprus
- Coordinates: 34°58′45″N 32°26′45″E
- Country: Cyprus
- District: Paphos District

Population (2001)
  - Total: 69
- Time zone: UTC+2 (EET)
  - Summer (DST): UTC+3 (EEST)
- Postal code: 6338

Choli (Greek: Χόλη) is a village in the Paphos District of Cyprus, located 7 km south of Polis Chrysochous. It is home to three churches: the late 15th- to early 16th-century Arkhángelos Mikaïl church, the 15th-century Panayía Odhiyítria Orthodox church and the 12th-century St George church.

== Nearby ==
The east side of the village is connected with the main road of Pafos-Poli Chrisochous, through the village Skoulli. The north side is connected with the village Goudi. In other words, Choli is only 2 kilometers from Goudi and 1.5 kilometers from Skoulli, which is actually the bridge of communication with Paphos.

== Climate ==
The average rainfall here is 580 mm annually.
