= Vouni tou Lazarou =

Vouni tou Lazarou Βουνί τού Λάζαρου
- Locality in Tsada
- Coordinates: 34°50′04″N 32°28′15″E
- Country: Cyprus
- District: Paphos District
- Elevation: 561 m (1,841 ft)
- Highest elevation: 580 m (1,900 ft)
- Lowest elevation: 539 m (1,768 ft)
- Time zone: UTC+2 (EET)
  - Summer (DST): UTC+3 (EEST)

Vouni tou Lazarou [Greek: Βουνί τού Λάζαρου] is a locality in Tsada, situated at 561 metres above sea level. Vouni tou Lazarou, Paphos District is a locality and is southwest of Tsáda and northeast of Aetovounos. Asprovounos is located only 1.8 km away.

== Climate ==
Climate data for Tsada, Cyprus (590 m)
Month	Jan	Feb	Mar	Apr	May	Jun	Jul	Aug	Sep	Oct	Nov	Dec	Year
Mean daily maximum °F (°C)	55 (13)	56.3 (13.5)	59.7 (15.4)	66.6 (19.2)	74.1 (23.4)	82.4 (28.0)	87.3 (30.7)	87.8 (31.0)	82.2 (27.9)	75.2 (24.0)	66.9 (19.4)	59.2 (15.1)	71.1 (21.7)
Mean daily minimum °F (°C)	42.1 (5.6)	41.5 (5.3)	43.5 (6.4)	48.2 (9.0)	54.5 (12.5)	61.7 (16.5)	65.5 (18.6)	66.6 (19.2)	61.7 (16.5)	56.3 (13.5)	50.2 (10.1)	44.8 (7.1)	53.1 (11.7)
Source: https://en.climate-data.org/
