= Moro Nero =

- Abandoned village
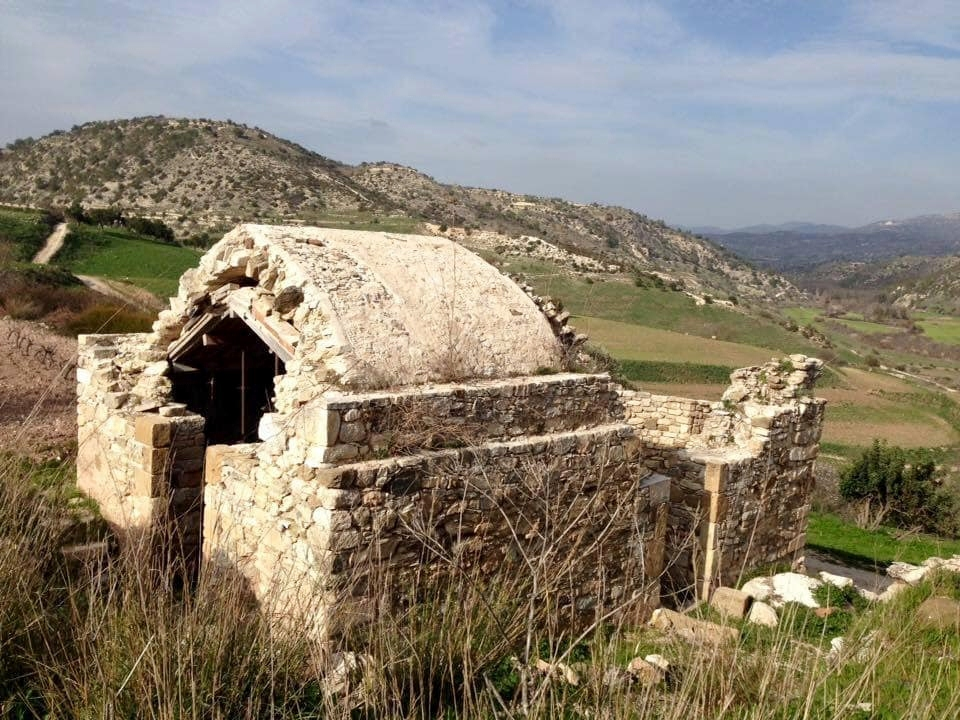
- Byzantine Church of Saint Gennadius in Moro Nero

- Locality in Kallepia
- Coordinates: 34°48′46″N 32°31′33″E
- Country: Cyprus
- District: Paphos District
- Elevation: 213 m (699 ft)
- Time zone: UTC+2 (EET)
  - Summer (DST): UTC+3 (EEST)

Moro Nero (or Moró Neró) (Greek: Μωρό Νερό; Turkish: Küçüksu) is a locality of Kallepia Village, Paphos District, Cyprus. The settlement is accessible only by the Kallepia Episkopi Nature Trail, Moro Nero was a mixed village inhabited by both Greek Cypriots and Turkish Cypriots. At the village there is the ruined Byzantine church of Saint Gennadius of Constantinople and it is believed that he was buried there. The settlement is situated 213 metres above sea level. Moró Neró, is southeast of Agrioelia (locality of Tsada) and west of Eledio. Episkopi is 2 km south of Moró Neró.

== Climate ==
Climate data for Paphos (Moro Nero, Cyprus 290 m) (1961–2022)
Month	Jan	Feb	Mar	Apr	May	Jun	Jul	Aug	Sep	Oct	Nov	Dec	Year
Average precipitation mm (inches)	131.3 (5.17)	95 (3.7)	67.1 (2.64)	33 (1.3)	11 (0.4)	1.7 (0.07)	0.8 (0.03)	0.2 (0.01)	3.3 (0.13)	41 (1.6)	81 (3.2)	135 (5.3)	600 (23.6)
Source: Cyprus Department of Meteorology

Climate data for Paphos (Pitargou, Cyprus 300 m) (2017–2022)
Month	Jan	Feb	Mar	Apr	May	Jun	Jul	Aug	Sep	Oct	Nov	Dec	Year
Average precipitation mm (inches)	119 (4.7)	82 (3.2)	80 (3.1)	56 (2.2)	19 (0.7)	23 (0.9)	1 (0.0)	4 (0.2)	16 (0.6)	46 (1.8)	61 (2.4)	109 (4.3)	616 (24.3)
Source: Cyprus Department of Meteorology
