= Cyprus–Israel military relations =

Bilateral security relations

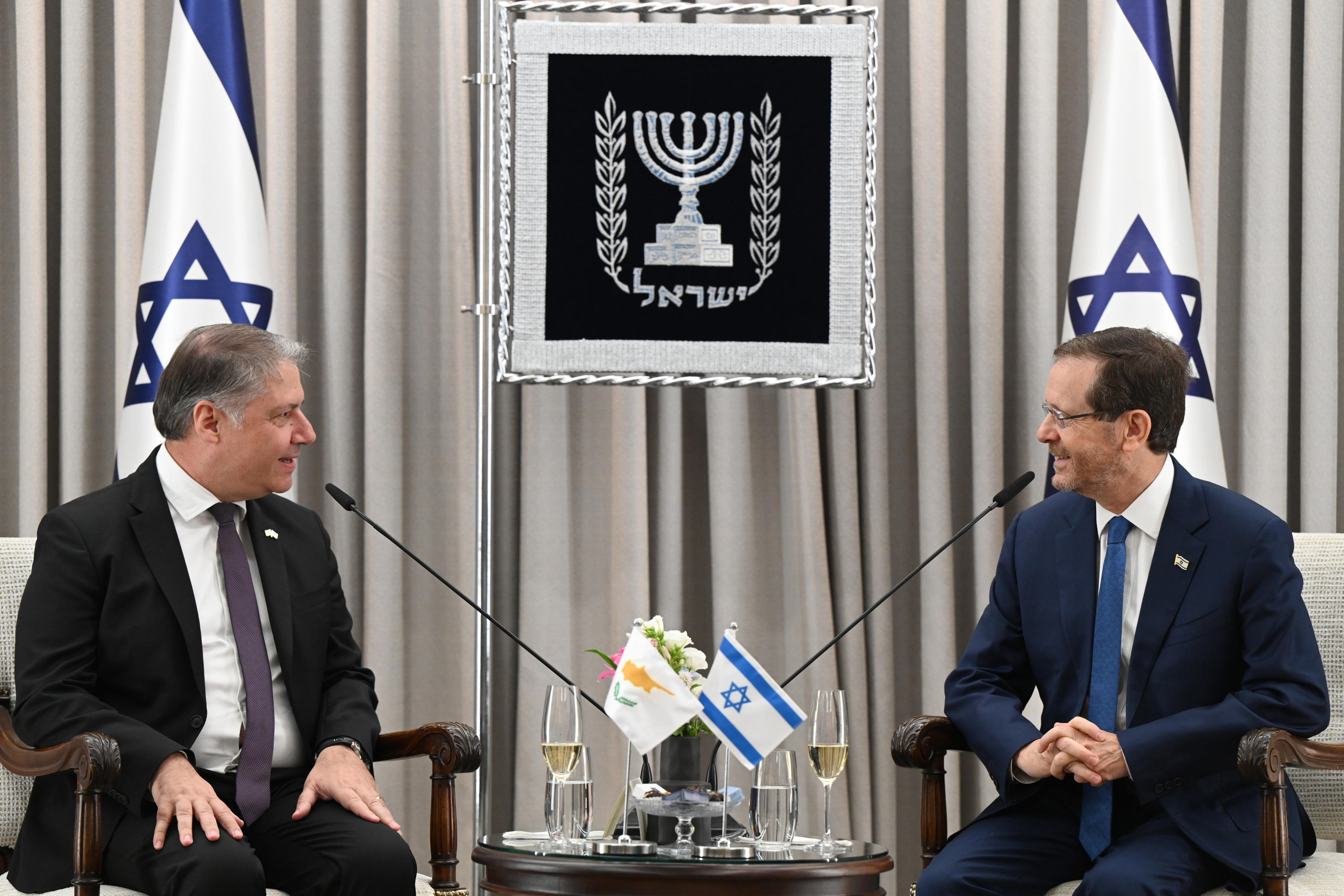
Cyprus and Israel maintain a close military relationship. Cypriot and Israeli flags during a meeting in Israel

Since the deterioration of Israel–Turkey relations after the 2010 Gaza flotilla raid, the Cypriot-Israeli strategic and military relationship has grown considerably with the two nations becoming close regional security partners.

Cyprus has also become a major buyer of Israeli equipment ranging to small arms to unmanned aerial vehicles while also assisting each other in humanitarian operations when needed.

== Joint military exercises ==
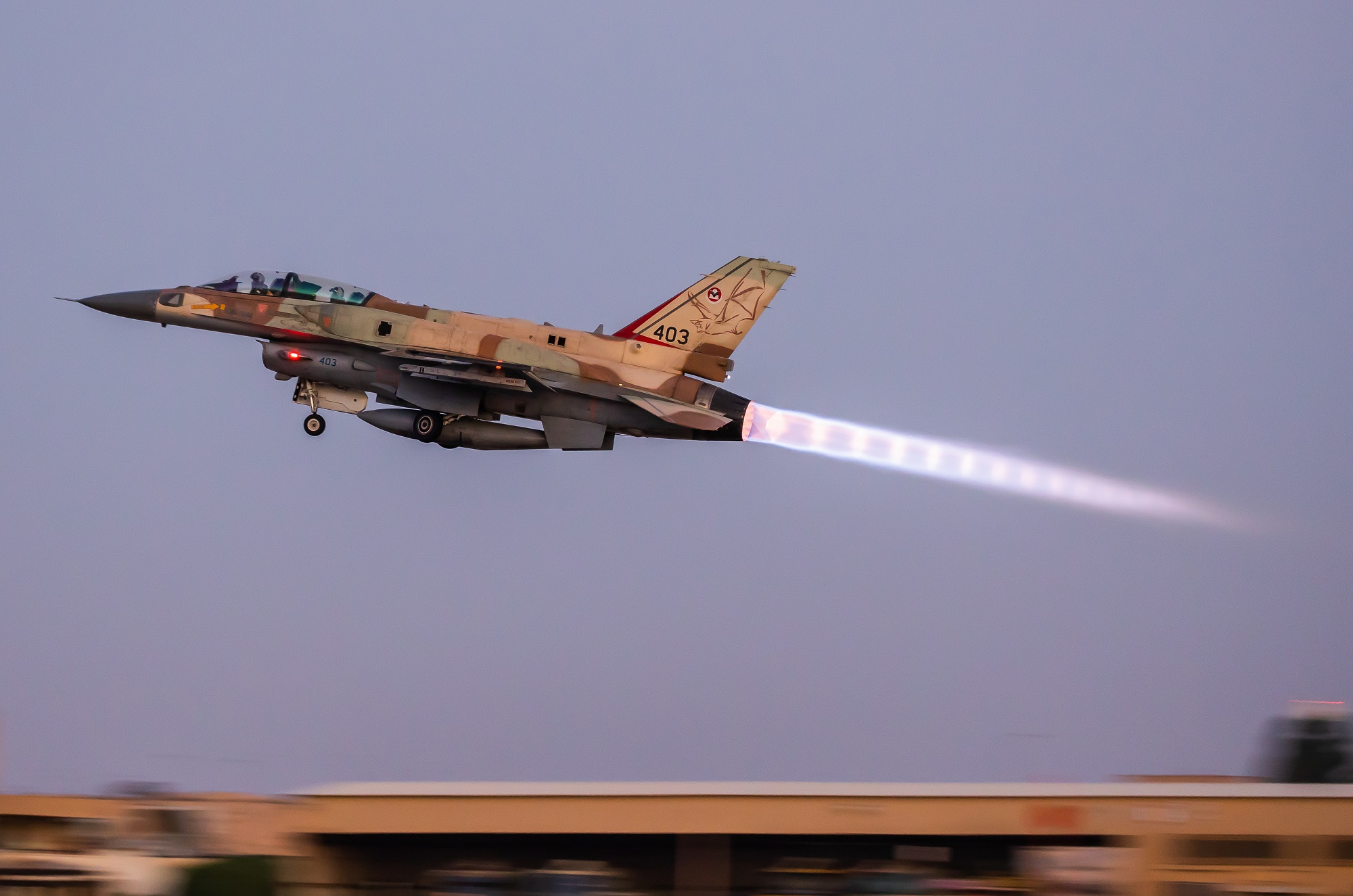
An Israeli jet takes off as part of the Onisilos-Gideon exercise.

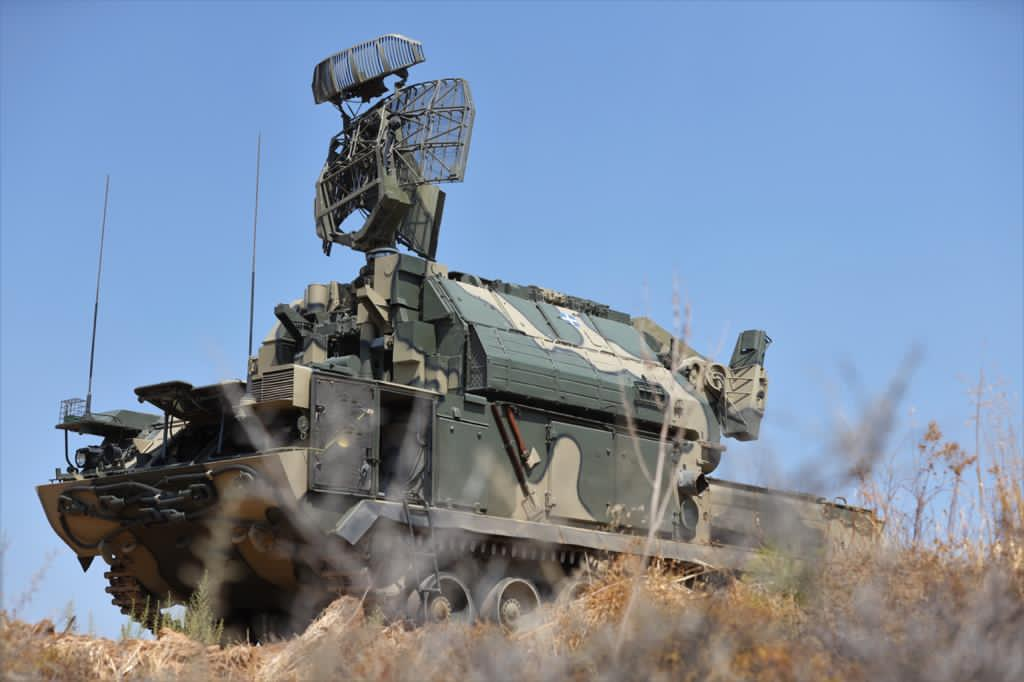
Cypriot air defenses working to track "enemy" movements.

One of the first joint military exercises between Cyprus and Israel came in February 2014, where Israeli Air Force jets conducted an exercise against Cypriot air defenses using both F-16s and F-15s during the exercise. The exercise took the codename Onisilos-Gideon and since then has taken place on an almost annual basis, with jets such as the Israeli F-35s being bought in.

In May 2014, ships from the Israeli Navy for the first time, took part in the multinational exercise "Argnoaut", which was organised by the Cypriot authorities and held within the Nicosia Flight information region (Nicosia FIR).

In March 2017, Cyprus took part as an observer in the noble dina exercise which is an exercise done by Israel and the United States however a small portion of the exercise was co-ordinated by the Cyprus Joint Rescue Coordination Center. Since 2021 however, Cyprus has become an active member in the exercise.

In June 2017, a major military exercise involving Cypriot special forces (LOK), Israeli special forces, including, the Oz Brigade and Egoz took place in the Troodos Mountains and Paphos Forest, with the Israeli troops being airlifted via C-130s Israeli Black-hawk helicopters.

In the fall of 2018, the two nations held a joint air and special forces military exercise, the air exercise dubbed "Iason 2018" and the special forces exercise "Nikolidis-David".

In 2022, exercise Agapinor was held between Cyprus and Israel, involving almost all divisions/branches from the Cypriot National Guard and the Israel Defense Forces. It was considered to be the largest exercise ever undertaken between the two countries in terms of personnel and equipment. Agapinor was held again in 2023 but to a smaller scale.

In May 2023, exercise Blue Sun-Jason was held again with the air forces of the two countries.

== Military hardware and access ==
Since the National Guards modernisation program came into place in with the Nicos Anastasiades government in 2013, Cyprus has bought multiple weapons and weapon systems from Israel including, the Tavor X95, Negev light machine gun and a number of UAVs. It is also reportedly buying the Merkava battle tank and the Barak MX surface to air missile system. Cyprus also allows Israel partial access to its FIR for Search and rescue operations.

== Controversies ==
Various military exercises that have been conducted between Cyprus and Israel have come under scrutiny from both the Cypriot communist party and the Turkish government.

== See also ==
- Cyprus–Israel relations
- Cypriot National Guard
- Israel Defense Forces
