= Ezousa River =

River in Paphos District, Cyprus

- Course within Cyprus
- Native name: Έζουσα (Greek)

Location
- Country: Cyprus
- District: Paphos District

Physical characteristics
- Source
  - location: Slopes of Tripylos (Troodos), east of the Stavros tis Psokas forest station
- Mouth: Mediterranean Sea
  - location: Near Acheleia / Geroskipou, east of Paphos International Airport
- Length: 41 km (25 mi)

The Ezousa River is a river in the Paphos District of Cyprus. With a length of about 41 km (25 mi), it is commonly listed as the sixth-longest river on the island.

== Course ==
The river rises high on the northern slopes of the Troodos Mountains, on the Tripylos massif east of the Stavros tis Psokas forestry station, and flows generally south through the uplands and the valley often referred to as the Ezousa Valley. It passes near the villages of Episkopi, Kallepeia, and Tsada before continuing towards the coastal plain, entering the Mediterranean Sea on the east side of Paphos near Acheleia/Geroskipou, close to Paphos International Airport.

== Hydrology and dams ==
The river is impounded by the Kannaviou Dam, a concrete-face rockfill dam (CFRD) completed in the mid-2000s with a reservoir capacity of about 18 million m³. The dam is located on the Ezousa upstream of the valley settlements and forms a key element of regional water supply and irrigation infrastructure.

== Ecology and protection ==
Sections of the valley and adjoining cliffs are protected under the Natura 2000 network. The Koilada Ezousas Special Protection Area (site code CY4000021) covers parts of the watershed important for birds, and the Kremmoi Ezousas site (CY4000022) protects additional cliff and valley habitats. The valley is also recognised as an Important Bird Area (IBA) owing to its bird communities and varied vegetation mosaics.

== Recreation ==
Waymarked paths and circular trails traverse parts of the Ezousa Valley, including a loop beginning at the Episkopi Environmental Information Centre and additional routes around the Minthis uplands and the Kannaviou reservoir.

== See also ==
- Rivers of Cyprus
- Kannaviou Dam
- Episkopi, Paphos
- Ezousa Valley
