= Agios Neophytos Monastery =

Monastery in Cyprus founded in the 12th century

Saint Neophytos Monastery
- Μονή Αγίου Νεοφύτου
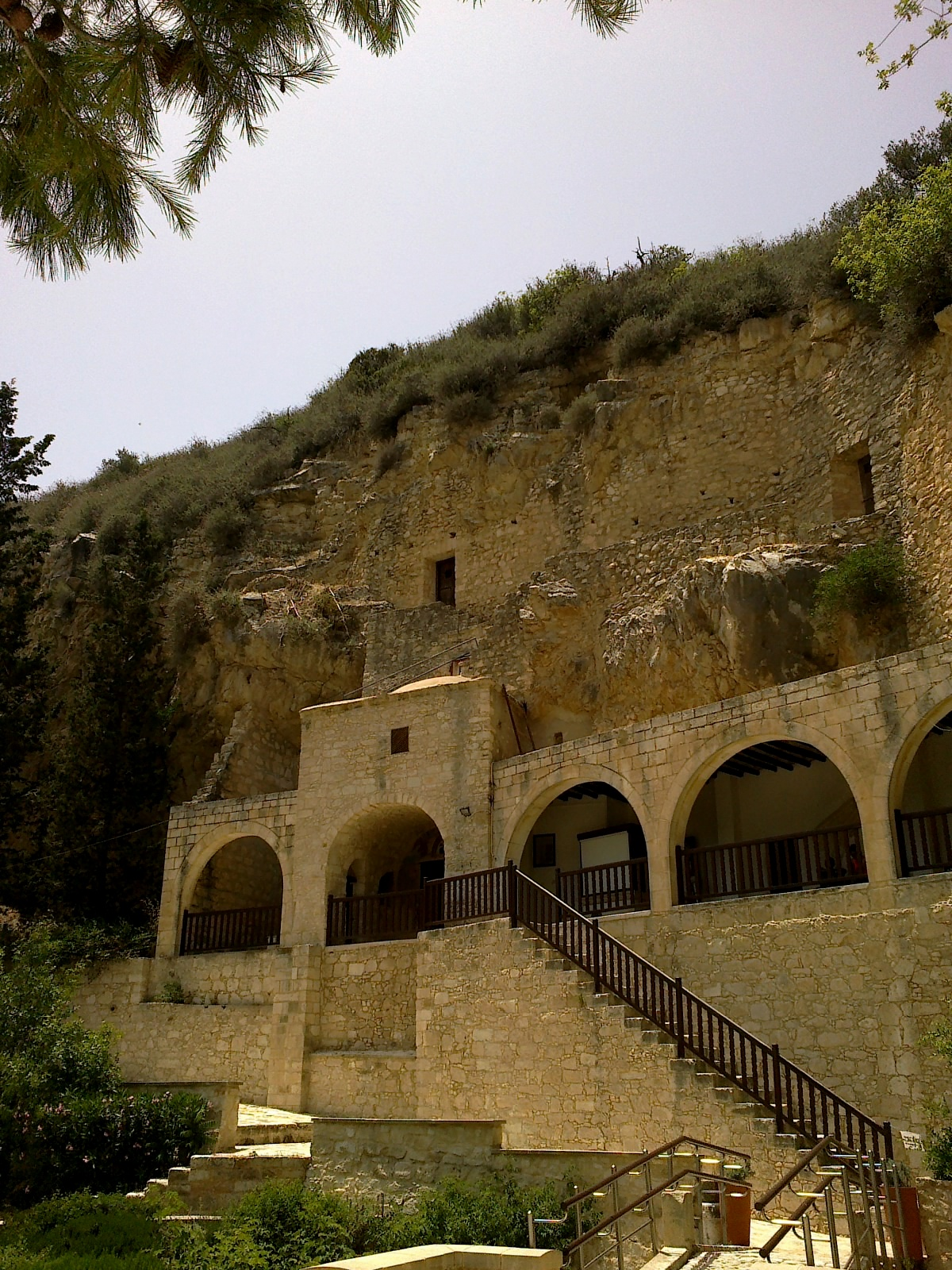

- Location within Cyprus

Monastery information
- Full name: The Holy, Royal and Stavropegic Monastery of Saint Neophytos (the Recluse)
- Order: Orthodox monasticism
- Established: 1159
- Dedication: Saint Neophytos
- Celebration: September 28
- Diocese: Church of Cyprus

People
- Founder: Saint Neophytos
- Prior: Leontios, Bishop of Chytri
- Important associated figures: Chrysostomos II of Cyprus

Site
- Location: Tala, Cyprus, Paphos District, Cyprus
- Coordinates: 34.725°N 32.6042°E

Saint Neophytos Monastery (Greek: Ιερά Μονή Αγίου Νεοφύτου) lies in the territory of the community of Tala, 1 km north of the village, and 15 km north of Paphos, is one of the best-known monasteries in Cyprus. It was founded by monk Neophytos in the 12th century. The property is currently a museum consisting of the Engleistra (Place of Seclusion, built in a natural cave, with a small chapel) and the Monastery. Agios Neofytos lies 4 km west of Tremithousa, and across the steep valley from the Tsiárta mountain.

It was founded by Neophytos.
