= Patriarch Gennadius of Constantinople =

Gennadius of Constantinople may refer to:

- Gennadius I of Constantinople, Ecumenical Patriarch in 458–471
- Gennadius II of Constantinople, Ecumenical Patriarch in 1454–1456, 1463 and 1464–1465
