= Stavros tis Psokas =

River in Cyprus

Coordinates: 35°03′N 32°25′E

Stavros tis Psokas is a river of Paphos District in western Cyprus. It is a tributary of the Chrysochou River and flows through Paphos Forest. It is dammed by the Evretou Dam which provides irrigation water to an area of roughly 2000 hectares. A forest station is located along the river.
