= Titsiros =

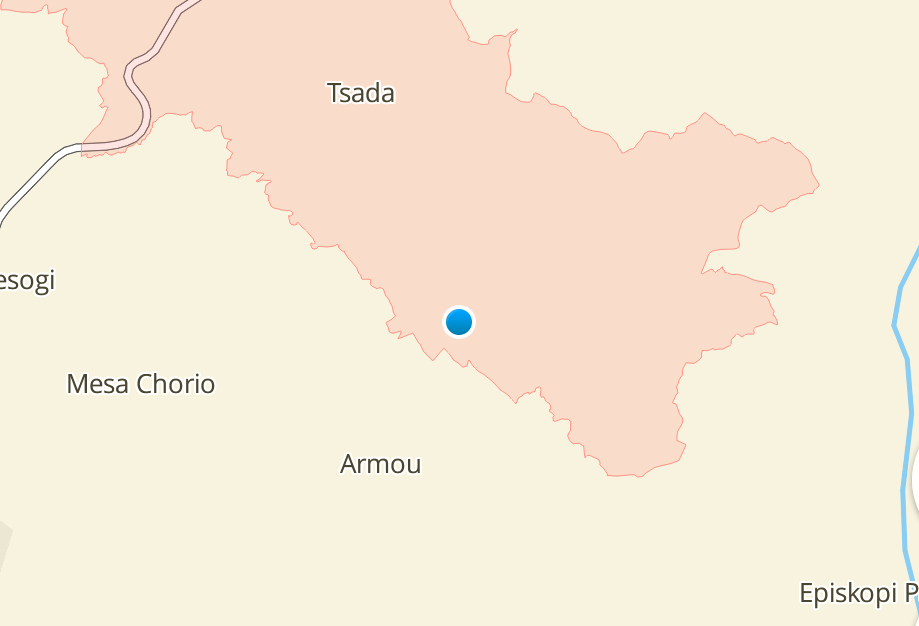
- Location of Titsiros

- Locality in Tsada
- Coordinates: 34°48′45″N 32°29′30″E
- Country: Cyprus
- District: Paphos District
- Elevation: 543 m (1,781 ft)
- Highest elevation: 560 m (1,840 ft)
- Lowest elevation: 508 m (1,667 ft)
- Time zone: UTC+2 (EET)
  - Summer (DST): UTC+3 (EEST)

Titsiros is a locality in Tsada in the Paphos District of Cyprus. Is located at 543 m above sea level. Nearby is Lartoyiannis, 1.9 km away. The terrain around Titsiros is hilly. The climate is classified as Csa by köppen climate classification.
