= Pitargou =

Pitargou Πιταργού Akkargı
- Location in Cyprus
- Coordinates: 34°50′13″N 32°32′3″E
- Country: Cyprus
- District: Paphos District
- Elevation: 300 m (980 ft)
- Highest elevation: 400 m (1,300 ft)
- Lowest elevation: 170 m (560 ft)

Population (2011)
  - Total: 0
- Time zone: UTC+2 (EET)
  - Summer (DST): UTC+3 (EEST)
- Postal code: 8547
- Area code: 6126
- Annual Rainfall: 615 mm

Pitargou (Greek: Πιταργού), also known as Pitarkou, is an abandoned Turkish Cypriot village in the Paphos District of Cyprus, located 3 km south of Letymvou. It is located 286m above sea level.

Today, the only standing building left is the building that was used in the past as a mosque and as a school. Pitargou is an abandoned village in the province of Paphos in Cyprus and it is situated 25 km northeast of the homonymous town, 72 km northwest of Limassol and 155 km southwest of Nicosia.

One of the many Turkish Cypriot villages in the province that are now deserted and left to the desolation of time, Pitargou was inhabited until 1974. In 1963, the year when the inter-communal riots between Greek Cypriots and Turkish Cypriots broke out and under the fear of an attack by groups of nationalists from nearby villages, Turkish Cypriots settled here from neighboring Choulou. Finally, the Turkish invasion of 1974 and the mutual exchange of populations that was agreed upon by Denktas-Cleridis forced the inhabitants to move to the Turkish northern territories occupied by the Turks.

The village receives 615 mm of precipitation annually.

== Climate ==
Climate data for Paphos (Pitargou, Cyprus 290 m) (2017–2022)
Month	Jan	Feb	Mar	Apr	May	Jun	Jul	Aug	Sep	Oct	Nov	Dec	Year
Average precipitation mm (inches)	119 (4.7)	82 (3.2)	80 (3.1)	56 (2.2)	19 (0.7)	23 (0.9)	1 (0.0)	4 (0.2)	16 (0.6)	46 (1.8)	61 (2.4)	109 (4.3)	616 (24.3)
Source: Cyprus Department of Meteorology
