= Neophytos of Cyprus =

Cypriot Orthodox monk, priest and sometime hermit (1134–1214)

Neophytos of Cyprus, Saint Neophytos, Neophytos the Recluse (Greek: Άγιος Νεόφυτος ο Έγκλειστος; 1134–1214) was a Cypriot Orthodox monk, priest, and sometime hermit, whose writings preserved a history of the early crusades.

== Life ==
Neophytos was born in the mountain village of Kato Drys near Pano Lefkara, Cyprus, to farming parents Athanasios and Eudoxia, one of eight children. An arranged marriage planned by his parents ended with him fleeing to the Monastery of Saint John Chrysostomos in Koutsovendis. After much ado, the marriage contracts were broken and Neophytos went back to the monastery as a novice, becoming a tonsured monk in 1152. During this time he learned to read and write and was eventually appointed as assistant sacristan. Although Neophytos wanted to be a hermit, his abbot declined to let him go, citing his youth.

In 1158, however, Neophytos was allowed to make a pilgrimage to the Holy Land. While he was there he unsuccessfully sought out hermits who might sponsor him. He returned to Cyprus, but still wanted to pursue the hermitic life. He tried to escape to Mount Latmos in Asia Minor, but was arrested at Paphos upon his attempted embarkation. He was soon released from prison, but the guards had stolen his travel funds, so, in June 1159, he went to the hilly area above Paphos, where he found a cave that had been used by a previous hermit. He enlarged the space, eventually creating three caves known today as the Cell, the Bema and the Naos.

Neophytos wrote a chronicle titled Περὶ τῶν κατὰ χώραν Κύπρον σκαιῶν (On the calamities against the country of Cyprus) dated to 1196, which is one of the few Greek primary sources that record the events of the Third Crusade in Cyprus and the pursuit of the Byzantine ruler of Cyprus, Isaakios Komninos by the English king Richard the Lionheart. Neophytos took a judgmental stance against the crusaders and his chronicle is anti-Latin.

== Legacy ==
Saint Neophytos Monastery was named in his honor.

== Publication history ==
- Σάθας, K. Νεόφυτου πρότερον μοναχού και Εγκλείστου, περί των κατά την χώραν Κύπρον σκαιών. Μεσαιωνική Βιβλιοθήκη Τόμος Β΄. Χρονογράφοι Βασιλείου Κύρπου. Εν Βενετία: Τύποις του Χρόνου (1873).

== See also ==
- Kingdom of Cyprus
- Leontios Machairas
- Georgios Boustronios
