= Koili =

Koili Κοίλη Kili
- Location in Cyprus
- Coordinates: 34°51′36″N 32°27′18″E
- Country: Cyprus
- District: Paphos District
- Elevation: 560 m (1,840 ft)

Population (2011)
  - Total: 466
- Time zone: UTC+2 (EET)
  - Summer (DST): UTC+3 (EEST)
- Postal code: 8543
- Area code: 6121

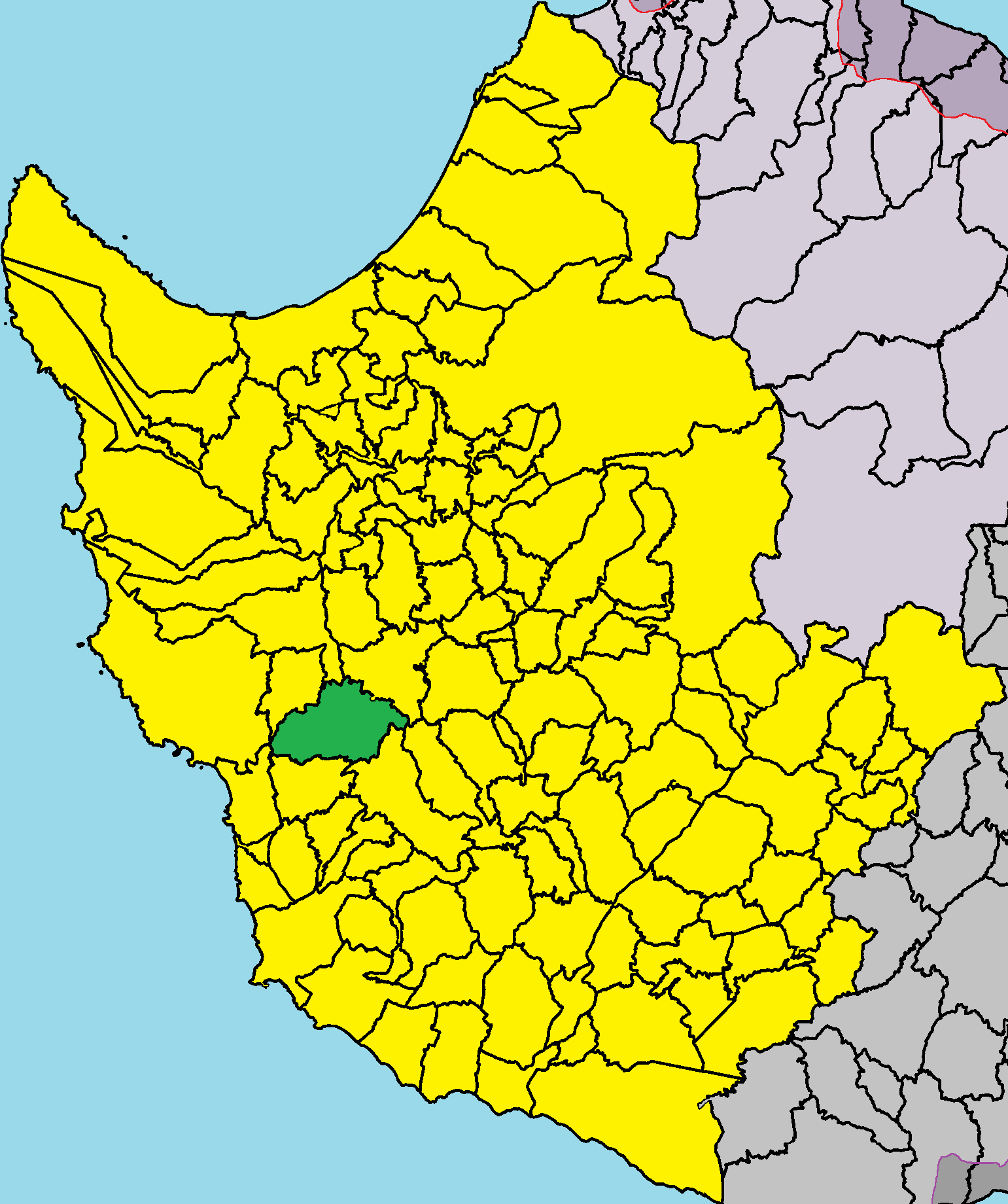
Koili in Paphos District

Koili (Greek: Κοίλη) is a village in the Paphos District of Cyprus, located 2 kilometres (1.2 mi) northwest of Tsada.

Koili has an altitude of 593 m above sea level. It receives 620 mm of rainfall annually.

Built at an altitude of 580 meters in a landscape divided by the Mavrokolympos river, Koili is a relatively large settlement built with stone from the quarry of the area that is not currently in operation. Here, apart from well-groomed old and modern houses, locals cultivate vineyards with grapes of the winemaking varieties, grains, citrus fruits, vegetables, almond and carob trees which are thriving.

Koili has a population of approximately 460 with about 25 non-Cypriot families living there. It is situated 9 km from Paphos and 33 km from Polis.

With its hilltop vantage point, there are views of Paphos and the surrounding hills. As it is a small village there is no restaurant, one small market, no kiosks and only one coffee shop. There is now an agricultural educational centre often used for local events or festivals. The nearest police station and hospital are both in Paphos.

The majority of the local houses and churches in Koili are made with local stone. The old church of Agios Mamas in Koili was ruined by a massive earthquake in 1955 and is now covered by a trimithia tree. Before the earthquake, the whole village and the locals of the surrounding villages would visit Agios Mamas to celebrate the end of Easter, and also celebrate the end of their fasting.

The church in the village square, Panagia Chryseleousis, replaced an older church which had stood in the same spot since the late 15th/early 16th century. It was completely rebuilt using stone from the local quarry, which is now disused.

== Climate ==
The ~600-meter elevation of Tsada and Koili places them in a distinct microclimatic zone compared to Paphos city (near sea level). This elevation difference induces adiabatic cooling, leading to lower average temperatures, especially evident when comparing Tsada's data to coastal stations like Paphos Airport or Paphos city.

Climate data for Koili, Cyprus (536 m)
Month	Jan	Feb	Mar	Apr	May	Jun	Jul	Aug	Sep	Oct	Nov	Dec	Year
Mean daily maximum °C (°F)	13.4 (56.1)	13.9 (57.0)	15.7 (60.3)	19.5 (67.1)	23.8 (74.8)	28.2 (82.8)	31.0 (87.8)	31.3 (88.3)	28.2 (82.8)	24.3 (75.7)	19.8 (67.6)	15.4 (59.7)	22.0 (71.7)
Mean daily minimum °C (°F)	5.8 (42.4)	5.6 (42.1)	6.6 (43.9)	9.1 (48.4)	12.8 (55.0)	16.5 (61.7)	18.7 (65.7)	19.3 (66.7)	16.5 (61.7)	13.7 (56.7)	10.3 (50.5)	7.3 (45.1)	11.9 (53.3)
Average precipitation mm (inches)	146.2 (5.76)	101 (4.0)	67.1 (2.64)	23.7 (0.93)	30 (1.2)	1.4 (0.06)	0.2 (0.01)	0.0 (0.0)	10.2 (0.40)	45.4 (1.79)	54.6 (2.15)	140.3 (5.52)	620.2 (24.42)
Average relative humidity (%)	77	75	70	62	55	49	49	53	56	59	67	75	63
Source: Climate Tsada

== Nearby villages ==
Tsada 2 km, Tala 4.3 km
