= Choulou =

Choulou Χούλου
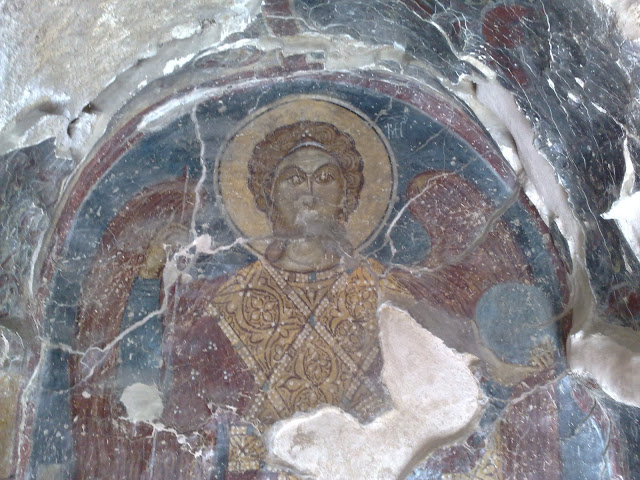
- St George fresco in Choulou

- Location in Cyprus
- Coordinates: 34°52′16″N 32°33′27″E
- Country: Cyprus
- District: Paphos District
- Elevation: 1,106 ft (337 m)

Population (2001)
  - Total: 190
- Time zone: UTC+2 (EET)
  - Summer (DST): UTC+3 (EEST)
- Postal code: 6129

Choulou (Greek: Χούλου, Turkish: Hulu) is a village in the Paphos District of Cyprus, located 6 km (3.7 mi) west of Agios Fotios at an elevation of about 350 m (1,150 ft) above sea level. It is located in the centre of the district next to the village Lemona and near Statos-Agios Photios and Letymbou villages. Choulou is east of the Ezousa River and its tributary the Chalaras.

Ιn the period of Frankish rule in Cyprus Choulou was a small feudal town. In 1950, it had a population of around 1,000 inhabitants. Today the population is around 150 and much of the village is abandoned.

Just outside the village is the Ammati forest. The traditional Cypriot tale 'Arodafnousa' was born in Choulou.

Choulou has five churches: Holy Cross, St Kononas, the Venetian church, St Theodoros, and the Byzantine church dedicated to St George. The village also has 2 taverns, 2 coffee shops, and one snack bar.
