= Letymvou =

Letymvou Λετύμβου Letymbou
- Location in Cyprus
- Coordinates: 34°51′20″N 32°30′49″E
- Country: Cyprus
- District: Paphos District
- Elevation: 1,257 ft (383 m)

Population (2001)
  - Total: 279
- Time zone: UTC+2 (EET)
  - Summer (DST): UTC+3 (EEST)
- Postal code: 6125
- Website: http://www.letymbou.org/

Letymvou (or Letymbou) (Greek: Λετύμβου/Λετύμπου) is a village in the Paphos District of Cyprus, located 12 km north of Paphos. It is located 383m above sea level and receives 620 mm of rainfall annually. For transportation, Letymbou is connected with Kourdaka in the east (about 3.5 km), Pitargou in the southeast (about 3 km) and Kallepia in the southwest (about 2 km).

== Climate ==
The climate is warm and temperate in Letymvou. The rain in Letymvou falls mostly in the winter, with relatively little rain in the summer. This climate is considered to be Csa according to the Köppen-Geiger climate classification. The average annual temperature in Letymvou is 17.5 °C.

Climate data for Paphos (Pitargou, Cyprus 300 m) (2017–2022)
Month	Jan	Feb	Mar	Apr	May	Jun	Jul	Aug	Sep	Oct	Nov	Dec	Year
Average precipitation mm (inches)	119 (4.7)	82 (3.2)	80 (3.1)	56 (2.2)	19 (0.7)	23 (0.9)	1 (0.0)	4 (0.2)	16 (0.6)	46 (1.8)	61 (2.4)	109 (4.3)	616 (24.3)
Source: Cyprus Department of Meteorology

Climate data for Tsada, Cyprus (612 m)
Month	Jan	Feb	Mar	Apr	May	Jun	Jul	Aug	Sep	Oct	Nov	Dec	Year
Mean daily maximum °C (°F)	13 (55)	13.5 (56.3)	15.4 (59.7)	19.2 (66.6)	23.4 (74.1)	28.0 (82.4)	30.7 (87.3)	31.0 (87.8)	27.9 (82.2)	24.0 (75.2)	19.4 (66.9)	15.1 (59.2)	21.7 (71.1)
Mean daily minimum °C (°F)	5.6 (42.1)	5.3 (41.5)	6.4 (43.5)	9.0 (48.2)	12.5 (54.5)	16.5 (61.7)	18.6 (65.5)	19.2 (66.6)	16.5 (61.7)	13.5 (56.3)	10.1 (50.2)	7.1 (44.8)	11.7 (53.1)
Average precipitation mm (inches)	168.2 (6.62)	72.13 (2.84)	45.15 (1.78)	14.65 (0.58)	5.75 (0.23)	0.2 (0.01)	0.05 (0.00)	0.0 (0.0)	14.45 (0.57)	44.7 (1.76)	80.9 (3.19)	175.1 (6.89)	621.28 (24.46)
Average relative humidity (%)	77	75	70	62	55	49	49	53	56	59	67	75	63
Source: Climate Tsada
