= Tsiárta =

- Mountain in Tsada
- Locality in Tsada
- Coordinates: 34°50′27″N 32°27′21″E
- Country: Cyprus
- District: Paphos District
- Elevation: 605 m (1,985 ft)
- Highest elevation: 616 m (2,021 ft)
- Lowest elevation: 590 m (1,940 ft)
- Time zone: UTC+2 (EET)
  - Summer (DST): UTC+3 (EEST)
- Annual rainfall: 610 mm

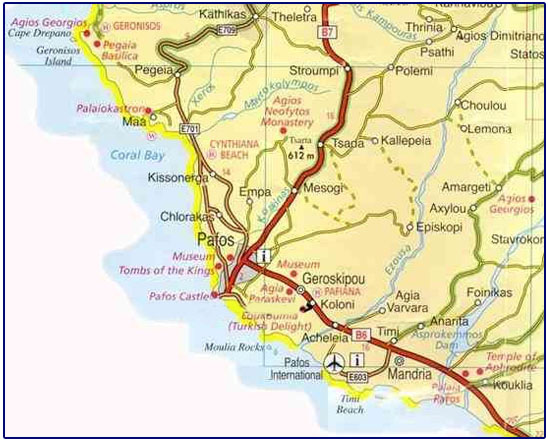

Tsiárta, also written Tsarta (Greek: Τσιάρτα), is a mountain in Tsada village in the Paphos District of Cyprus, situated at 605 m elevation. It is east of Melissóvounos. The highest part is located 616 m above sea level. It is near Asprovounaro. The average annual rainfall is 572 millimeters. The wettest month is January, with an average of 123 mm of precipitation. The driest month is August, with 2 mm of precipitation. The terrain around Tsiárta is mainly hilly.

== Climate ==
Climate data for Agios Neophytos, Cyprus (420 m)
| Month | Jan | Feb | Mar | Apr | May | Jun | Jul | Aug | Sep | Oct | Nov | Dec | Year |
|---|---|---|---|---|---|---|---|---|---|---|---|---|---|
| Average precipitation mm (inches) | 125 (4.9) | 98 (3.9) | 71 (2.8) | 36 (1.4) | 14 (0.6) | 2 (0.1) | 1 (0.0) | 1.0 (0.04) | 4 (0.2) | 38 (1.5) | 72 (2.8) | 124 (4.9) | 587.1 (23.11) |
| Average precipitation days (≥ 0.2 mm) | 13.3 | 8.8 | 5.9 | 3.6 | 3.3 | 0.3 | 0.0 | 0.0 | 1.5 | 4.3 | 4.3 | 10.6 | 55.9 |
| Average relative humidity (%) | 77 | 75 | 70 | 62 | 55 | 49 | 49 | 53 | 56 | 59 | 67 | 75 | 63 |
Source: Climate Tsada
