= Goudi, Cyprus =

Goudi Γουδί
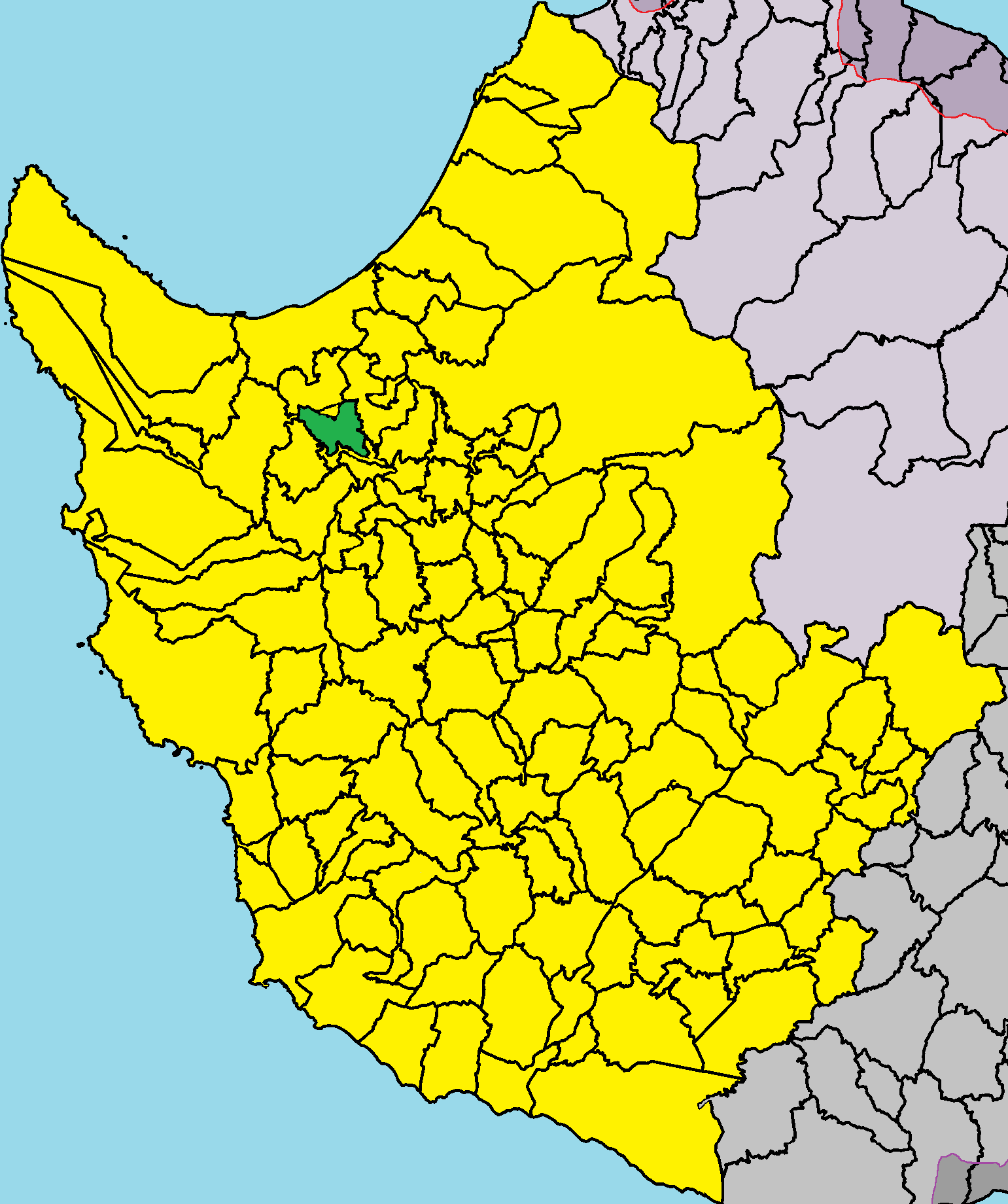
- Goudi, Paphos District, Cyprus

- Location in Cyprus
- Coordinates: 34°59′27″N 32°26′28″E
- Country: Cyprus
- District: Paphos District
- Elevation: 98 m (322 ft)

Population (2001)
  - Total: 145
- Time zone: UTC+2 (EET)
  - Summer (DST): UTC+3 (EEST)
- Postal code: 6345

Goudi (Greek: Γουδί) is a village in the Paphos District of Cyprus, located 6 km south of Polis Chrysochous on the Chrysochou River. It is spread out over a mild hillside between 60 and 120 meters above sea level.

The climate is warm and temperate. The winter months are much rainier than the summer months. This climate is considered to be Csa according to the Köppen-Geiger climate classification. The average annual temperature in Goudi is 19.1 °C. The village receives approximately 575 mm of rainfall annually.
