= Paphos Forest =

Mediterranean forest in Cyprus

Coordinates: 35°02′N 32°38′E

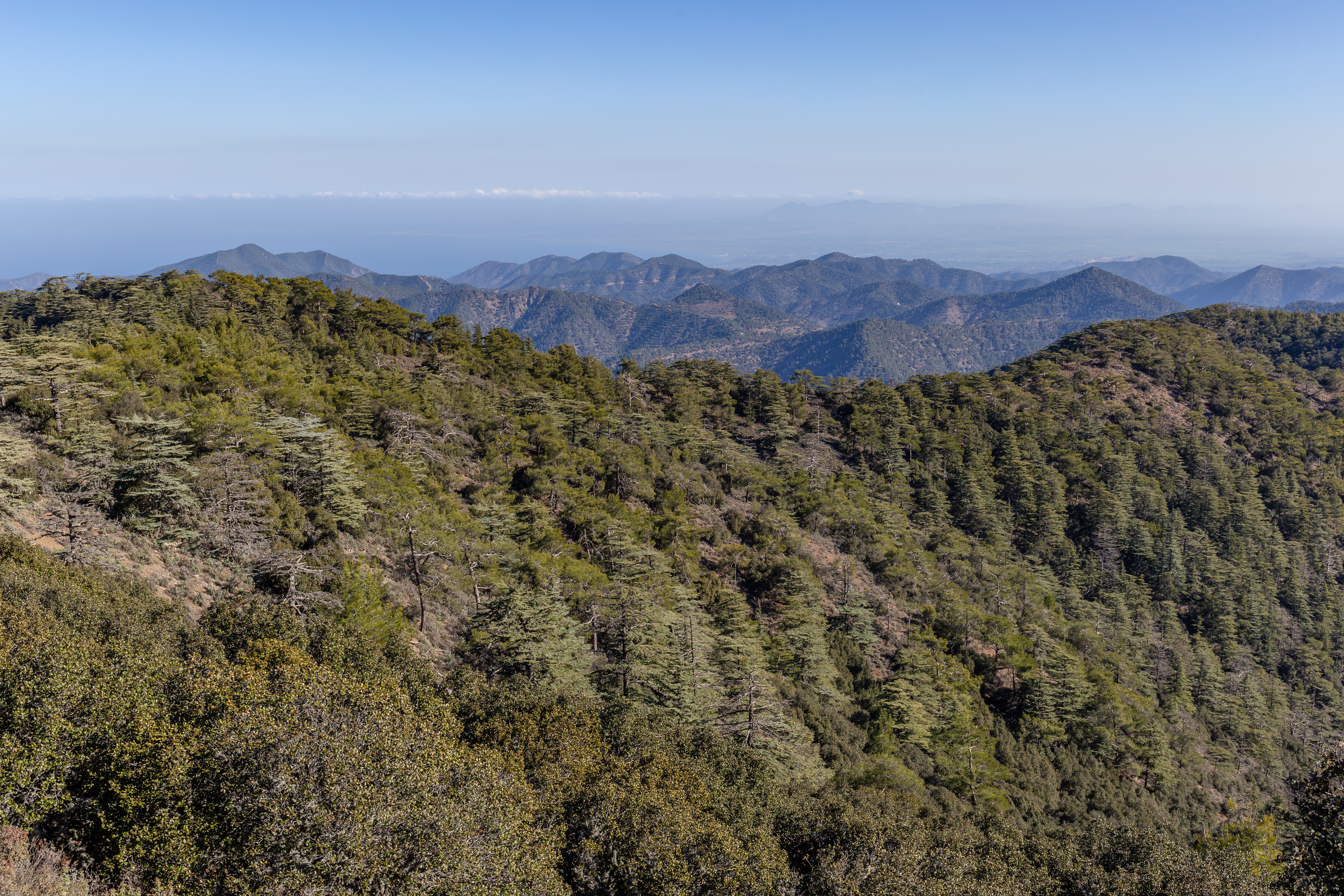
Paphos Forest at Mount Tripylos

The Paphos Forest is in western Cyprus. It covers much of the Troodos Mountains, with an area of 10,000 hectares. Its lowest elevation is sea level; its highest is 1,352 metres at the peak of Mount Tripylos. It is part of the Cyprus Mediterranean forests ecoregion. The Paphos Forest is managed by the Cyprus Ministry of Agriculture, Rural Development and the Environment.

== Ecology ==
Location of Paphos Forest in Cyprus

=== Flora ===
The Paphos Forest is part of the Cyprus Mediterranean forests terrestrial ecoregion. Coniferous trees like Brutia pine (Pinus brutia) and Cyprus cedar (Cedrus brevifolia) are dominant in the forest, along with evergreen broadleaf trees like the endemic golden oak (Quercus alnifolia) and Greek strawberry trees (Arbutus andrachne). Deciduous trees like Platanus orientalis and Oriental alder (Alnus orientalis) are prevalent mostly near rivers and forest streams.

Cyprus cedar on Mt. Tripylos, Paphos Forest

=== Fauna ===
The forest is home to the Cyprus mouflon, red fox and Cyprus mouse. Also present in the forest are eight species of snakes and a large variety of lizard and frog species.

=== Climate ===
The Paphos Forest has a Hot-summer Mediterranean climate (Csa in the Köppen climate classification), with long, hot, mostly dry summers and mild wet winters. Higher altitudes may experience relatively colder winters. The Paphos Forest receives significantly more rainfall than other areas of Cyprus due to orographic lift.

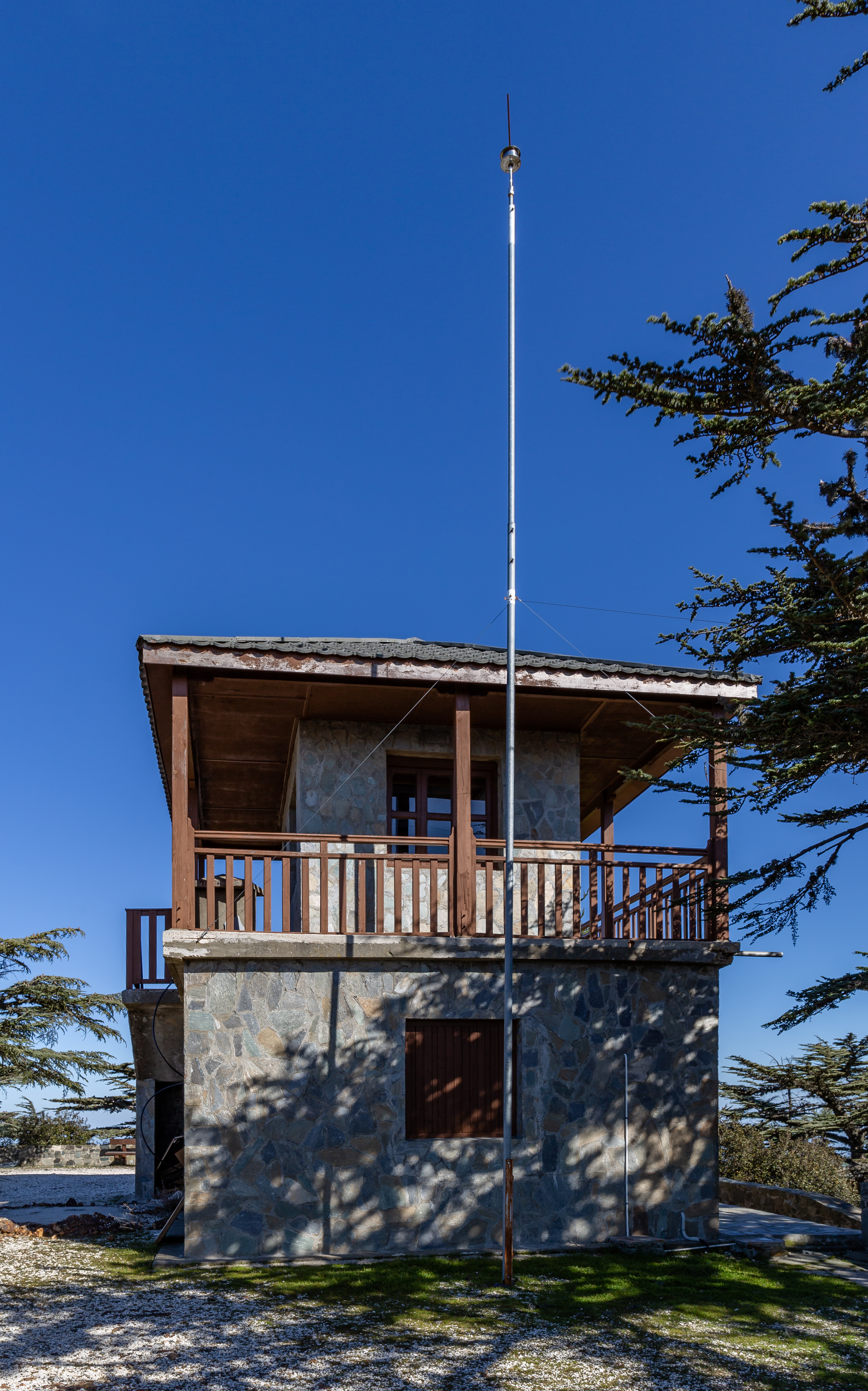
Fire lookout tower on Mt. Tripylos, Paphos Forest

== See also ==
- Diarizos River
- Ezousa River
- Ezousa Valley
- Geography of Cyprus
