= Kannaviou Dam =

Artificial lake in the Paphos District of Cyprus

Kannaviou Reservoir, Cyprus

Kannaviou Artificial Lake (or Kannaviou Dam or Kannaviou Reservoir) is an artificial lake in the Paphos District of Cyprus. The largest part of the lake is located in the Asprogia community (which borders the Kannaviou community), while a very small part of it is within the administrative boundaries of the Kritou Marottou community.

A dam was built to create the artificial lake. Its construction began in September 2000 and was completed in March 2006. Water storage in the artificial lake (reservoir) began in October 2005. The dam is a rock-cut dam with a floodplain.

The Kannaviou Artificial Lake has a capacity of 18 million cubic meters of water, making it the fourth largest artificial lake in Cyprus. The water collected in the lake comes from the Ezousa River.

The Kannaviou Artificial Lake overflowed five times from the day of its construction until today:

- March 2, 2010
- January 28, 2012
- December 23, 2012
- January 7, 2020
- March 21, 2022
