= Tala, Cyprus =

Tala
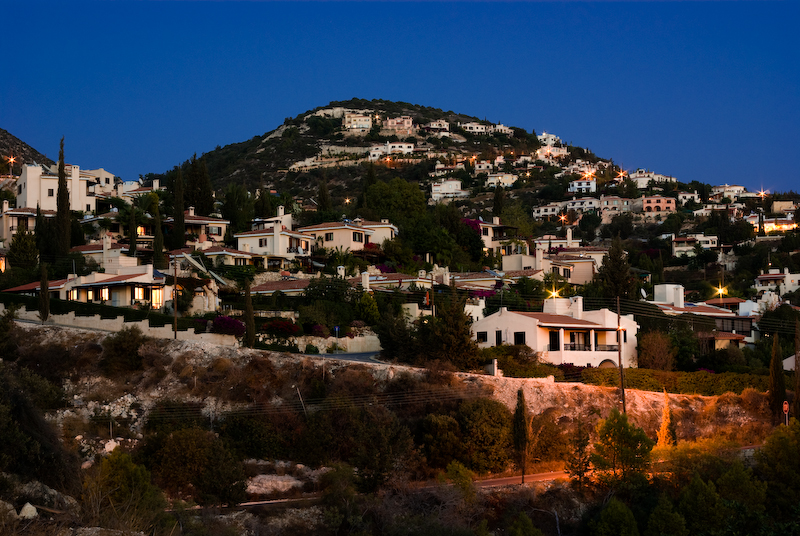

- Location within Cyprus
- Coordinates: 34°50′10″N 32°25′51″E
- Country: Cyprus
- District: Paphos District

Government
  - Community Council President: Areti Pieridou
- Lowest elevation: 150 m (490 ft)

Population (2011)
  - Total: 2,695
- Climate: Csa
- Website: www.tala.org.cy

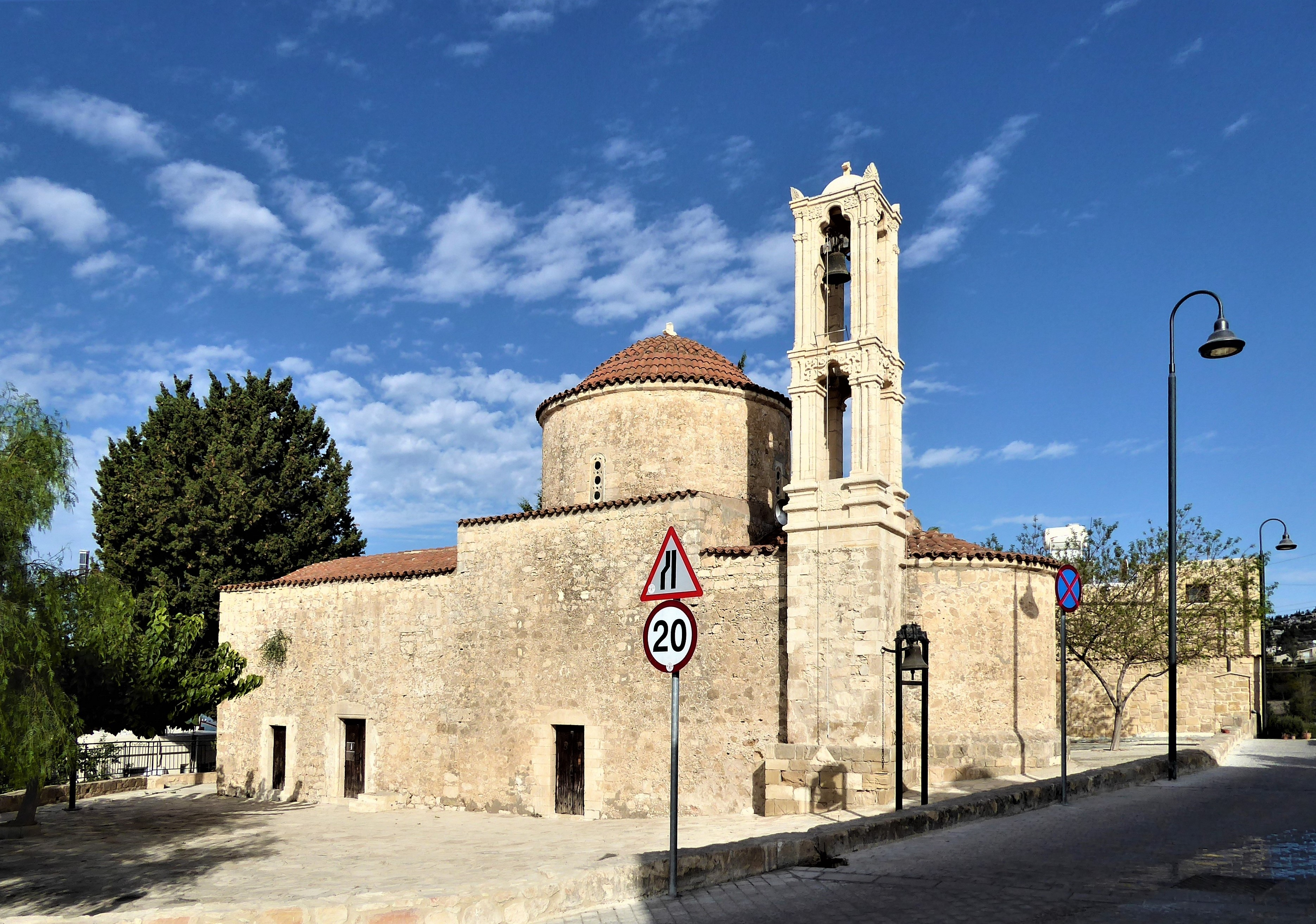
Church of St Catherine, Tala

Tala (Greek: Τάλα) is a large suburban village 6 km north of Paphos, Cyprus. Many non-Cypriots (mostly British) have moved here permanently or have a summer home in Tala. Agios Neophytos Monastery is 1 km north. Is located 290 meters above sea level. Tala receives an average annual rainfall of about 520 millimeters; grapevines (wine-making and table grape varieties), citrus fruits (orange trees, lemon trees), locust, olive, almond, and walnut trees, cereals, forage plants, vegetables, and a few banana trees are cultivated in the region. As far as stockbreeding is concerned, it is limited.

== Gallery ==
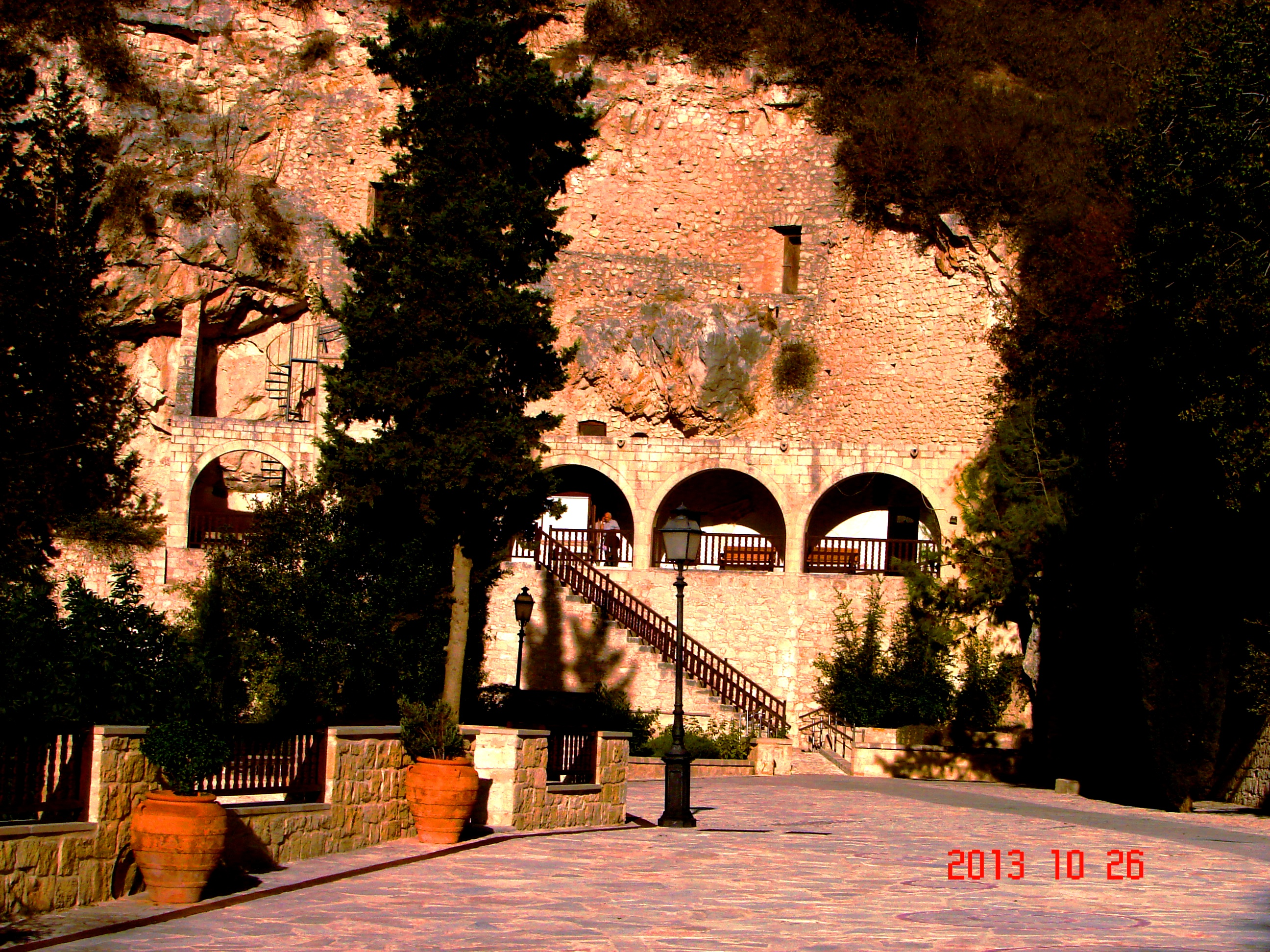
Agios Neophytos Monastery

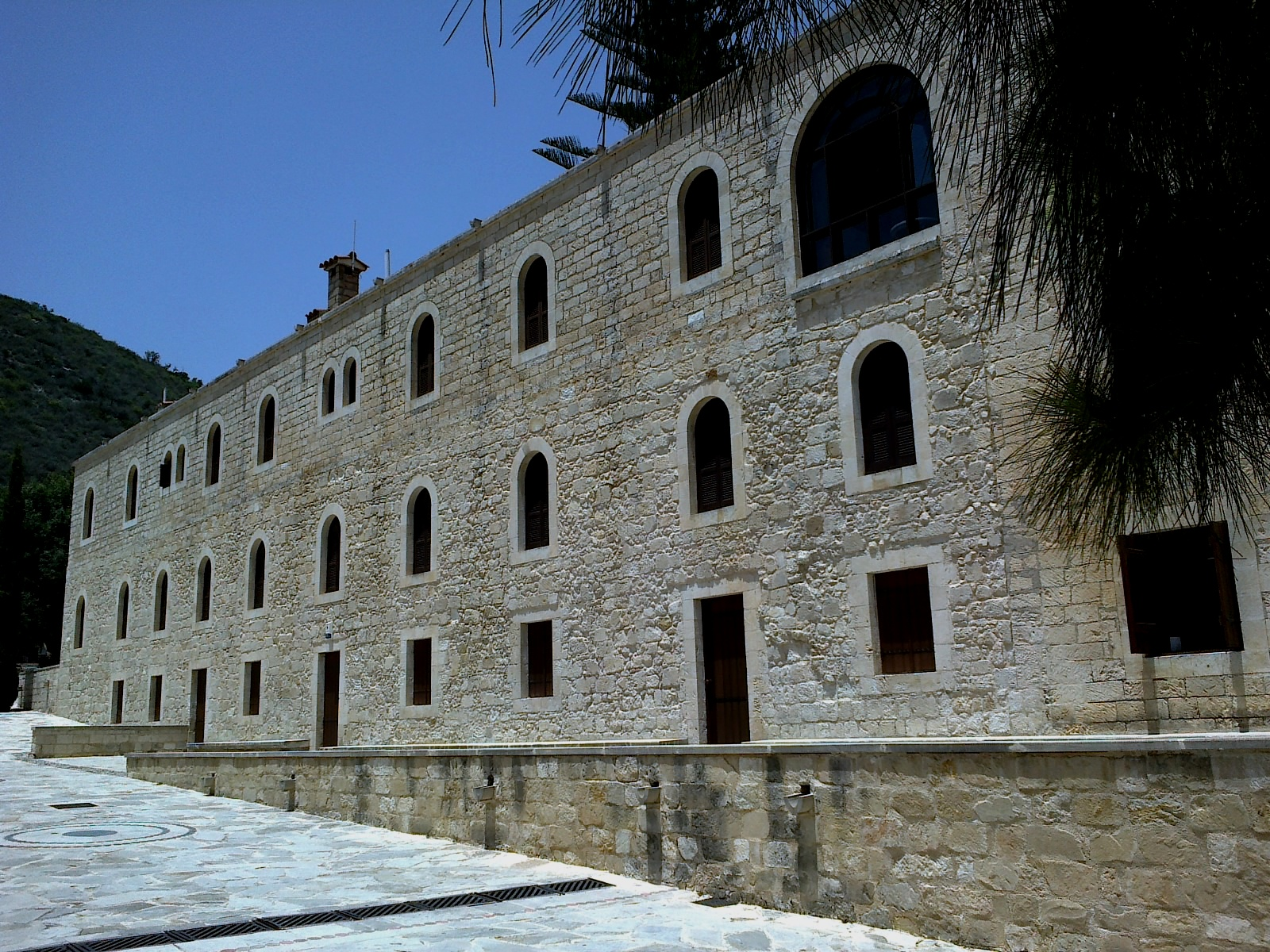

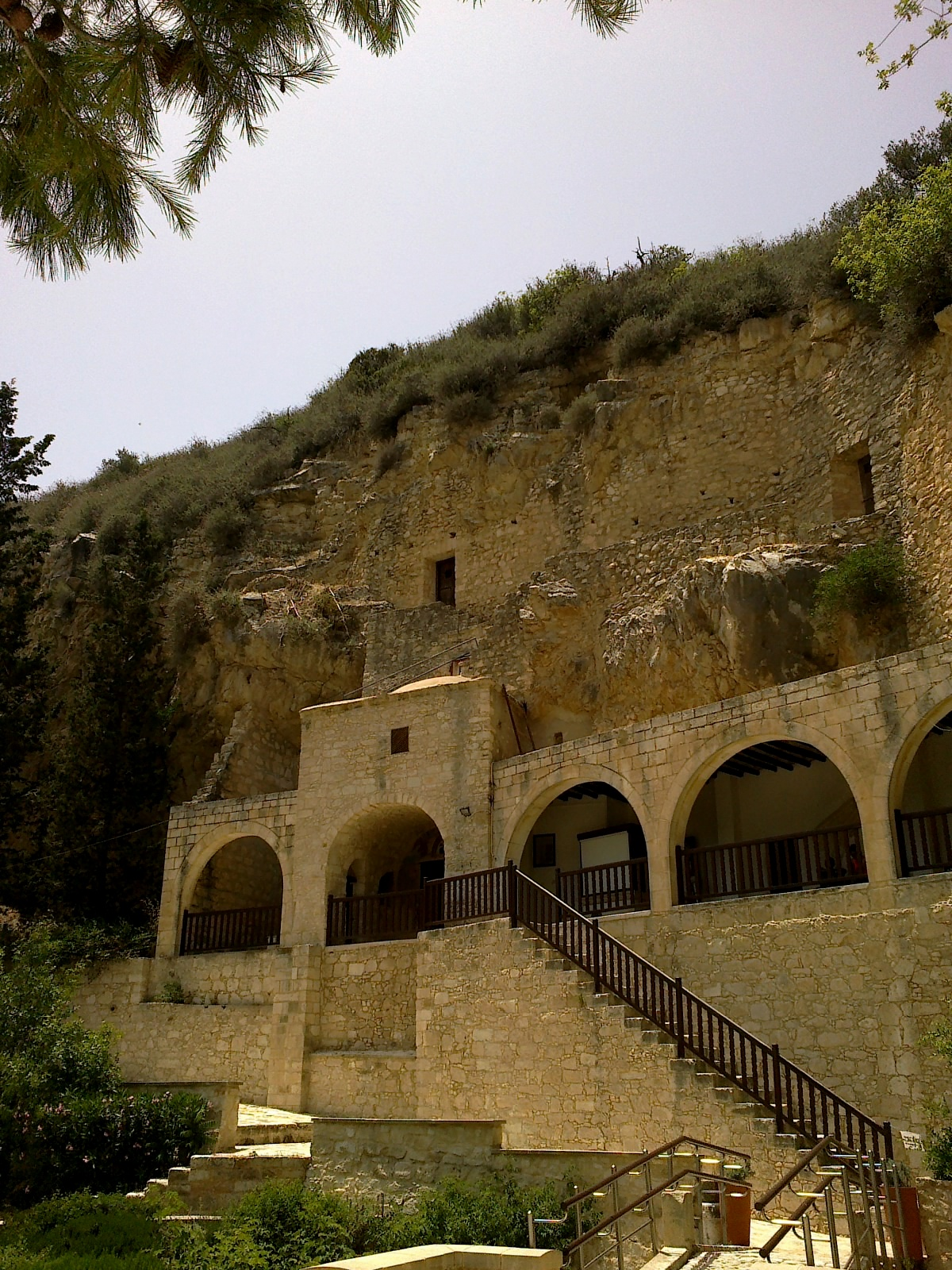
