= Statos–Agios Fotios =

Statos–Agios Fotios Στατός-Άγιος Φώτιος
- Location in Cyprus
- Coordinates: 34°53′7″N 32°37′16″E
- Country: Cyprus
- District: Paphos District

Population (2011)
  - Total: 243
- Postal code: 6227
- Website: www.statos-agiosphotios.org

Statos–Agios Fotios (Greek: Στατός-Άγιος Φώτιος) is a community consisting of two villages, Statos and Agios Fotios, in the Paphos District of Cyprus. The two are located about 4 km south-south-west of Pano Panagia. As of 2011, their combined population was 243.

== Geography ==
Built at an altitude of 913 meters, amidst a verdant landscape on the eastern slopes of the mountainous areas of the province, Statos–Agios Fotios is a sparsely populated village with well- kept gardens and good planning.

== History ==
It is a partnership and a unification of two separate settlements, which in the 1970s became a single one. The two villages, which were two kilometers away from each other during the 1966-1969 period, due to the rapid rainfall, suffered serious damage from the devastating landslides of the era, and the then government called special geologists to study the phenomenon. It was therefore deemed necessary to move the settlements to another location and so the residents of the two communities decided to unite, with the consent of the local government and the President of the Republic of Cyprus Archbishop Makarios III. At the end of 1973, the first inhabitants of the new village began to move, while with the Turkish invasion of 1974, many refugees from the occupied northern areas of Cyprus moved to the area, building there their new home. The houses in the two previous settlements were abandoned, with the exception of some that the shepherds use when they take their herds grazing in the area.

== Economy ==
=== Agriculture ===
Statos–Agios Fotios, the most mountainous village in the province of Paphos, has a great tradition in viticulture and because of the altitude, the vineyards of the area are the last to ripen. This is where the black grape, the xinisteri, the cabernet, and, to a lesser extent the malaga variety, thrive. Another natural feature of the community is the walnut tree, since all the streets are planted with these beautiful trees, while apple, pear, peach, cherry and many other fruit and citrus trees are also growing in the area. From the grape, the inhabitants produce traditional zivania (pomace brandy), soutzoukos (traditional local sweets made out of grapes) and raisins. In the local dairy and meat processing farms locals produce plenty of dairy and deli products such as tsamarellla, sausages of Paphos, haloumi, trachanas, walnuts and almonds are produced. There are also small workshops in the area that make traditional spoon sweets (sweet preserves).

=== Tourism ===
Statos–Agios Fotios is a preferred starting point for excursions to nearby churches-monasteries in the area and a community that offers tranquility, with a cool climate during the summer months in the Cypriot countryside. It will satisfy any visitor who will ascend to the highest point of the province.

== Notable people ==
- Chrysostomos I of Cyprus, Archbishop of Cyprus, was born in Statos.
