= Episkopi, Paphos =

Episkopi Επισκοπή
- Village
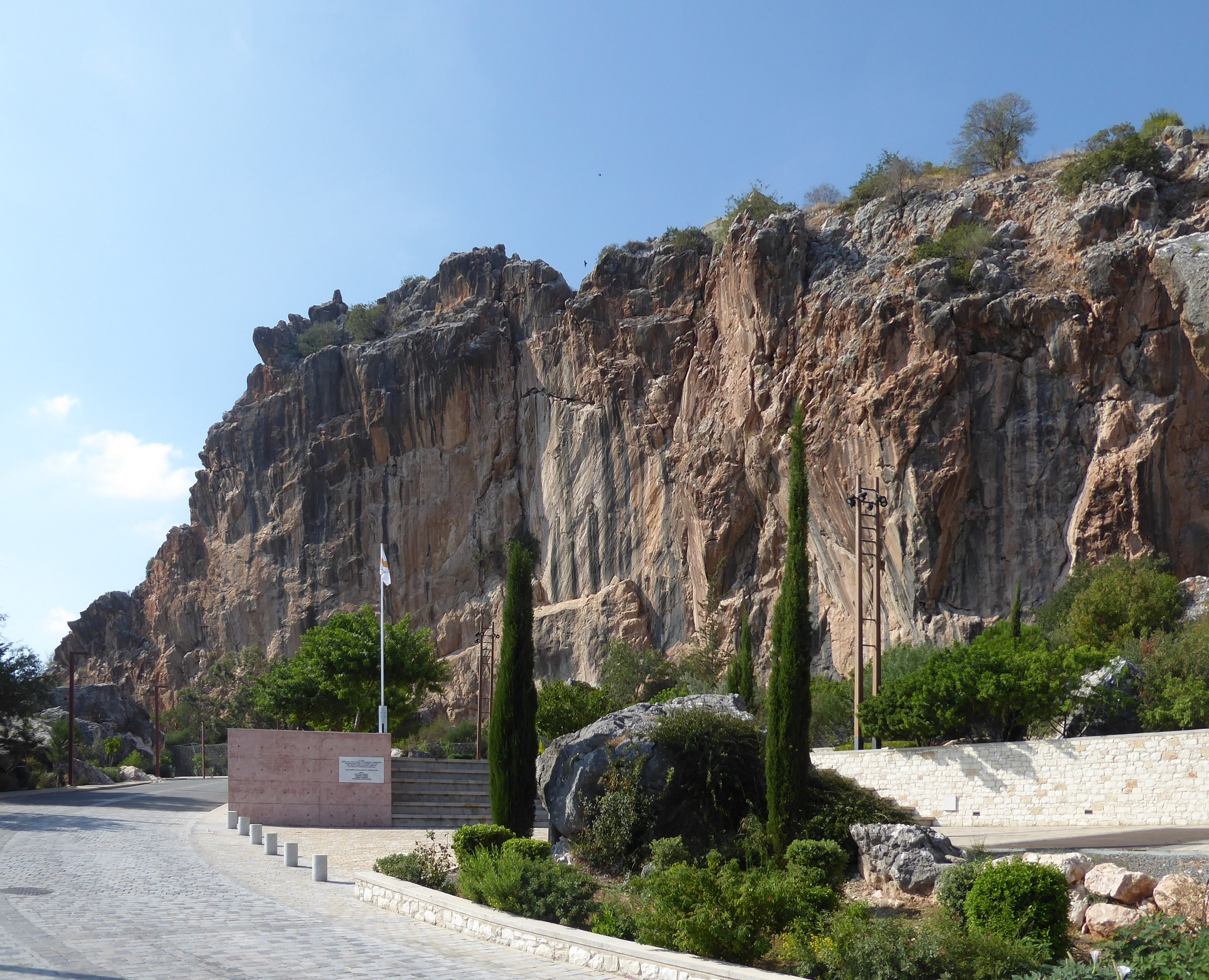
- The rock of Epsikopi

- Location in Cyprus
- Coordinates: 34°47′41″N 32°31′32″E
- Country: Cyprus
- District: Paphos District

Population (2001)
  - Total: 162
- Time zone: UTC+2 (EET)
  - Summer (DST): UTC+3 (EEST)

Episkopi, also known as Episcopi, Episcopí, Piskobu, is a village 11 kilometres northeast from the city of Paphos in Cyprus. It is located at 188 metres (617 ft) above sea level. Episkopi Paphou is one of the “villages of Minthi”, along with Kallepia, Tsada and the Minthis Hills tourist project, which essentially consists of a “cooperation” of communities, under a common umbrella, in order to highlight their history, their tradition and their unique natural environment. The “villages of Minthi” have released a guide with tourist information and walks in the valley of Ezousa, highlighting the place as a rural tourism area.

Episkopi was built on the west side of Ezousa River valley. The area's geological configurations and the existence of the valleys with their permanent water supply have resulted in a large spectrum of species and habitations.

== Historical monuments ==
In addition to the old stone drinking fountain is the Episkopi Rock awarded for excellence in restoration (1997), Europa Nostra award: the 16th-century Sindi Monastery.
