= Tsada =

Tsada Τσάδα Tsadha
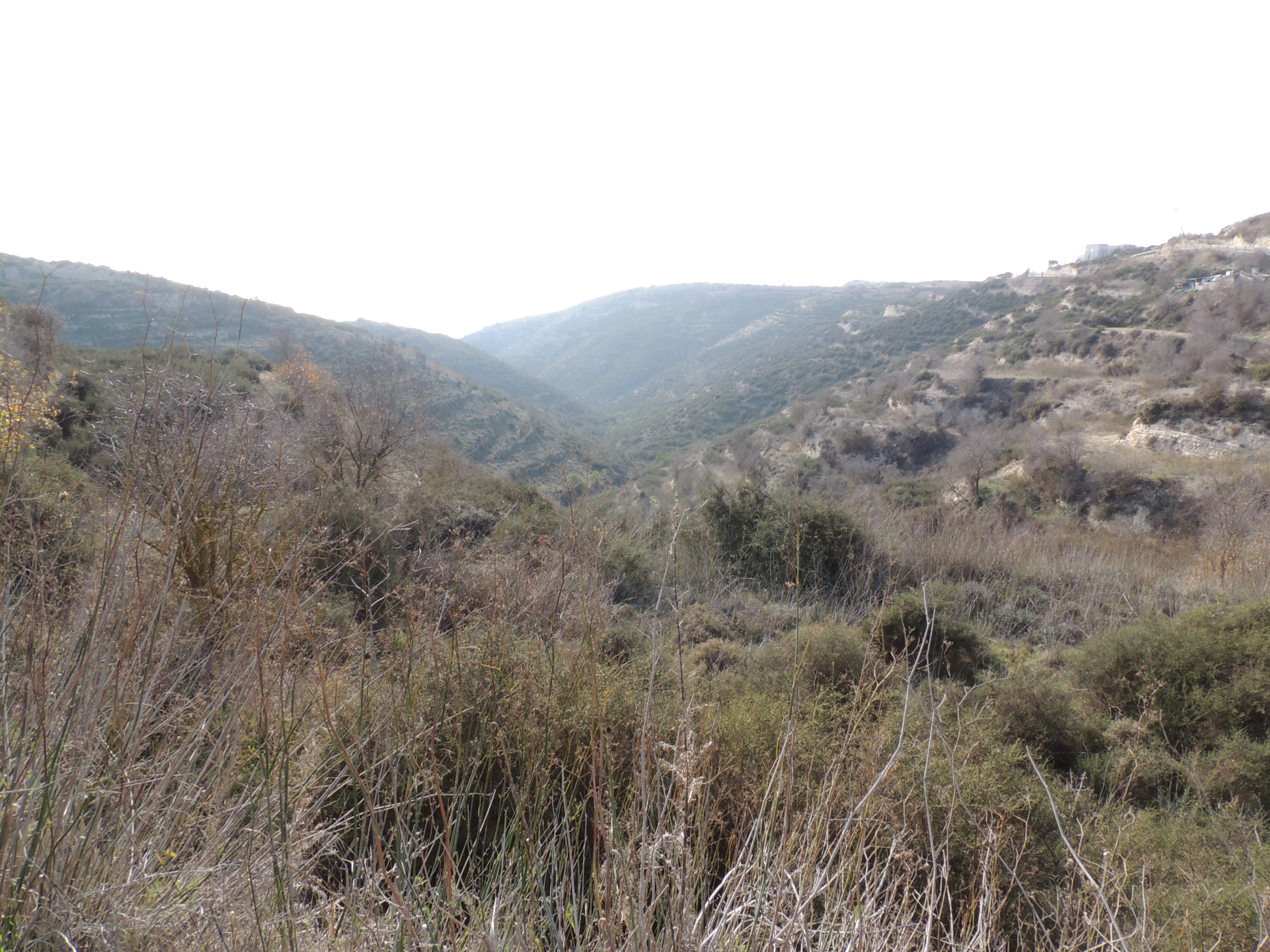

- Location in Cyprus
- Coordinates: 34°50′8″N 32°28′29″E
- Country: Cyprus
- District: Paphos District

Government
  - Mayor: Mr. Iordanis

Area
  - Total: 17.0063 km^{2} (6.5662 sq mi)
- Elevation: 575 m (1,886 ft)
- Highest elevation: 627 m (2,057 ft)

Population (2021)
  - Total: 1,180
  - Density: 67.35/km^{2} (174.4/sq mi)
- Time zone: UTC+2 (EET)
  - Summer (DST): UTC+3 (EEST)
- Postal code: 8540
- Area code: 6120
- Climate: Csa (Hot-summer Mediterranean climate)
- Annual Rainfall: 610 millimetres (24 in)

Tsada (earlier (before 1985) written Tsadha) is a relatively big village 8 km North of Paphos city center. Although the proximity between them, the 600 m elevation difference gives to the Tsada area a totally different identity. It receives 610 millimetres (24 in) of precipitation annually. The climate is much cooler all year long (during the hot and humid summers in Paphos the temperature gap can reach 6 °C) and it also is one of the few areas in the Paphos District that snows almost every year by the end of January. Tsada was the home village of EOKA member Evagoras Pallikarides. Although the history of the village can be counted 500 years ago, there is no significant architectural character, and only a few residences were reconstructed in the traditional way. The Melisovouno hill between Tsada and Koili village hosts Paphos television and radio antenna.

Tsada has a hot-summer Mediterranean climate. Winter months are rainier than summer months, and frost and snow can happen during winters. Tsada's climate makes it a prime location for growing grain, various trees, and some nuts, and it is one of the largest vine producers in its area. It has approximately 1,200 inhabitants and it and neighboring locations Episkopi, Kallepia, and Minthis Hills cooperate with each other to attract tourists, and have released a tourism and hiking guide for the Ezousa valley to this end.

== Climate ==
Tsada has a hot-summer Mediterranean climate (Köppen climate classification: Csa). Its winter months are much more rainy than summer months. Frost occasionally occurs at night almost every winter and snow falls in some winters. Winter temperatures can drop to 0 °C or less.

Climate data for Tsada, Cyprus (590 m)
Month	Jan	Feb	Mar	Apr	May	Jun	Jul	Aug	Sep	Oct	Nov	Dec	Year
Mean daily maximum °C (°F)	13 (55)	13.5 (56.3)	15.4 (59.7)	19.2 (66.6)	23.4 (74.1)	28.0 (82.4)	30.7 (87.3)	31.0 (87.8)	27.9 (82.2)	24.0 (75.2)	19.4 (66.9)	15.1 (59.2)	21.7 (71.1)
Mean daily minimum °C (°F)	5.6 (42.1)	5.3 (41.5)	6.4 (43.5)	9.0 (48.2)	12.5 (54.5)	16.5 (61.7)	18.6 (65.5)	19.2 (66.6)	16.5 (61.7)	13.5 (56.3)	10.1 (50.2)	7.1 (44.8)	11.7 (53.1)
Average precipitation mm (inches)	168.2 (6.62)	72.13 (2.84)	45.15 (1.78)	14.65 (0.58)	5.75 (0.23)	0.2 (0.01)	0.05 (0.00)	0.0 (0.0)	13.45 (0.53)	44.7 (1.76)	80.9 (3.19)	175.1 (6.89)	620.28 (24.42)
Average relative humidity (%)	77	75	70	62	55	49	49	53	56	59	67	75	63
Source: Climate Tsada

== Landmarks ==
There is a 12th-century chapel just outside the village that used to be a part of a monastery. Nowadays, Stavros tis Minthis is right next to an 18-hole golf course, Minthis Hills, the first ever created in Cyprus. Here a resort will be created.

To the west of the village stands the 616 m Tsiárta mountain.

== Transportation ==
Tsada lies next to a transportation hub linking most of Paphos district's villages. It is next to the current route from Paphos to Polis, and to the main route towards traditional villages like Kallepia and Choulou. There is a bus connection to both Paphos and the Polis − Lachi area on a daily basis.
