= Kallepia =

Kallepia Καλλέπια
- Location in Cyprus
- Coordinates: 34°50′43″N 32°30′1″E
- Country: Cyprus
- District: Paphos District
- Elevation: 496 m (1,627 ft)

Population (2001)
  - Total: 216
- Time zone: UTC+2 (EET)
  - Summer (DST): UTC+3 (EEST)
- Postal code: 8541
- Area code: 6124
- Annual Rainfall: 630 mm
- Average Temperature: 17.1 °C

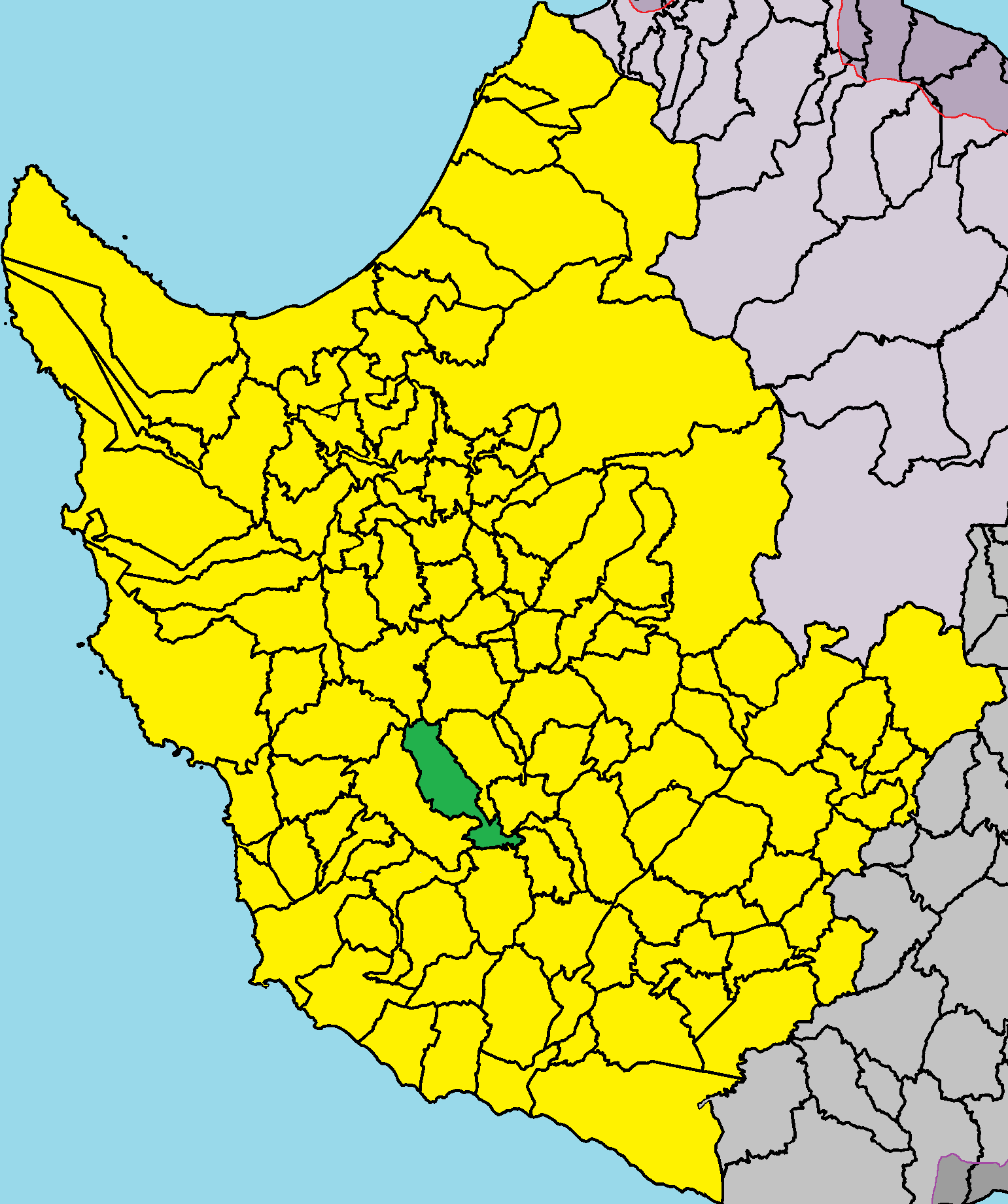
Kallepia in the Paphos District.

Kallepia (also known as Kallepeia Village) (Greek: Καλλέπια) is a village in the Paphos District of Cyprus, located 2 km south of Letymvou. The village of Moro Nero is part of the municipality. It is located 497 metres (1,631 ft) above sea level. Its peak is around 590 metres (1,940 ft). It receives 630 millimetres (25 in) of rainfall annually.

== Topography ==
Kallepia is a mountainous settlement at an altitude of 490 meters with a pluralistic scenery of mountains, cliffs, wild vegetation and cultivated land with vineyards, apple trees, lemon trees, orange trees, almonds, carob trees, grain and a few olive trees. It has approximately 200 inhabitants and is considered among the first wine-producing villages of the province of Paphos. It is a popular destination with many cottages belonging to both local and foreign visitors who come at weekends and in the summer. The river Ezousas and its tributaries Ammati and Kalamos pass here which, together with the many natural springs, cool down Kallepia and the surrounding regions and provide water for the fruit trees and the vegetables.

== Climate ==
Climate data for Kallepia, Cyprus (466 m)
Month	Jan	Feb	Mar	Apr	May	Jun	Jul	Aug	Sep	Oct	Nov	Dec	Year
Mean daily maximum °C (°F)	14 (57)	14.5 (58.1)	16.3 (61.3)	19.9 (67.8)	24.1 (75.4)	28.6 (83.5)	31.3 (88.3)	31.6 (88.9)	28.6 (83.5)	24.8 (76.6)	20.3 (68.5)	16.0 (60.8)	22.5 (72.5)
Mean daily minimum °C (°F)	6.0 (42.8)	5.9 (42.6)	6.9 (44.4)	9.3 (48.7)	12.8 (55.0)	16.6 (61.9)	18.7 (65.7)	19.2 (66.6)	16.6 (61.9)	13.8 (56.8)	10.5 (50.9)	7.6 (45.7)	12.0 (53.6)
Average precipitation mm (inches)	170 (6.7)	75 (3.0)	47 (1.9)	15 (0.6)	6 (0.2)	0 (0)	0 (0)	0 (0)	15 (0.6)	46 (1.8)	83 (3.3)	173 (6.8)	630 (24.8)
Average relative humidity (%)	77	75	70	62	55	49	49	53	56	59	67	76	63
Source: Cyprus Department of Meteorology

Climate data for Paphos (Kallepia: Moro Nero, Cyprus 290 m) (1961–2022)
Month	Jan	Feb	Mar	Apr	May	Jun	Jul	Aug	Sep	Oct	Nov	Dec	Year
Average precipitation mm (inches)	131.3 (5.17)	95 (3.7)	67.1 (2.64)	33 (1.3)	11 (0.4)	1.7 (0.07)	0.8 (0.03)	0.2 (0.01)	3.3 (0.13)	41 (1.6)	81 (3.2)	135 (5.3)	600 (23.6)
Source: Cyprus Department of Meteorology

Climate data for Paphos (Pitargou, Cyprus 290 m) (2017–2022)
Month	Jan	Feb	Mar	Apr	May	Jun	Jul	Aug	Sep	Oct	Nov	Dec	Year
Average precipitation mm (inches)	119 (4.7)	82 (3.2)	80 (3.1)	56 (2.2)	19 (0.7)	23 (0.9)	1 (0.0)	4 (0.2)	16 (0.6)	46 (1.8)	61 (2.4)	109 (4.3)	616 (24.3)
Source: Cyprus Department of Meteorology

== Topography ==
Kallepia is a semi-mountainous settlement at an altitude of 490 meters with a pluralistic scenery of mountains, cliffs, wild vegetation and cultivated land with vineyards, apple trees, lemon trees, orange trees, almonds, carob trees, grain and a few olive trees. It has approximately 200 inhabitants and is considered among the first wine-producing villages of the province of Paphos. It is a popular destination with many cottages belonging to both local and foreign visitors who come at weekends and in the summer. The river Ezousas and its tributaries Ammati and Kalamos pass here which, together with the many natural springs, cool down Kallepia and the surrounding regions and provide water for the fruit trees and the vegetables.

== Population ==
Kallepia contains an eclectic mix of inhabitants. About 50% are the original, villagers and the remainder are retired expatriates from all over the world, mainly from the UK with a few from the USA, Israel and Germany.

== Facilities ==
There is one Cypriot taverna, two traditional coffee shops and a restaurant.
