= Peristerona, Paphos =

Peristerona Περιστερώνα
- village
- Location in Cyprus
- Coordinates: 34°59′26″N 32°29′21″E
- Country: Cyprus
- District: Paphos District
- Elevation: 408 m (1,339 ft)

Population (2001)
  - Total: 198
- Time zone: UTC+2 (EET)
  - Summer (DST): UTC+3 (EEST)
- Postal code: 8810

Peristerona (Greek: Περιστερώνα) is a small village located in the Paphos District of Cyprus, 9 km south of Polis. Hidden among the mountains of the area, the settlement of Peristerona Paphou maintains the traditional elements of Cypriot architecture, while there are plenty of those who build their country houses or hotel units in the area, encouraging foreigners and locals to visit the settlement. The village overlooks from above the vast peninsula of Akamas and the dam of Evretos.

This village can be found a short 15-minute drive away from the coastal towns of Polis Chrysochous and Latchi, as well as a 40-minute drive from Paphos.

== Transportation ==
The route along the old road that leads to the village of Lysos, and from there to Pelathousa, ending in Polis Chrysochous, is considered one of the most beautiful routes on the island. Finally, Peristerona Paphou is adjacent to Steni Paphou, next to Meladeia and very close to the villages of Trimithousa and Filousa Chrysochous.

Peristerona is located 408 m above sea level.
