= Giolou =

Giolou Γιόλου
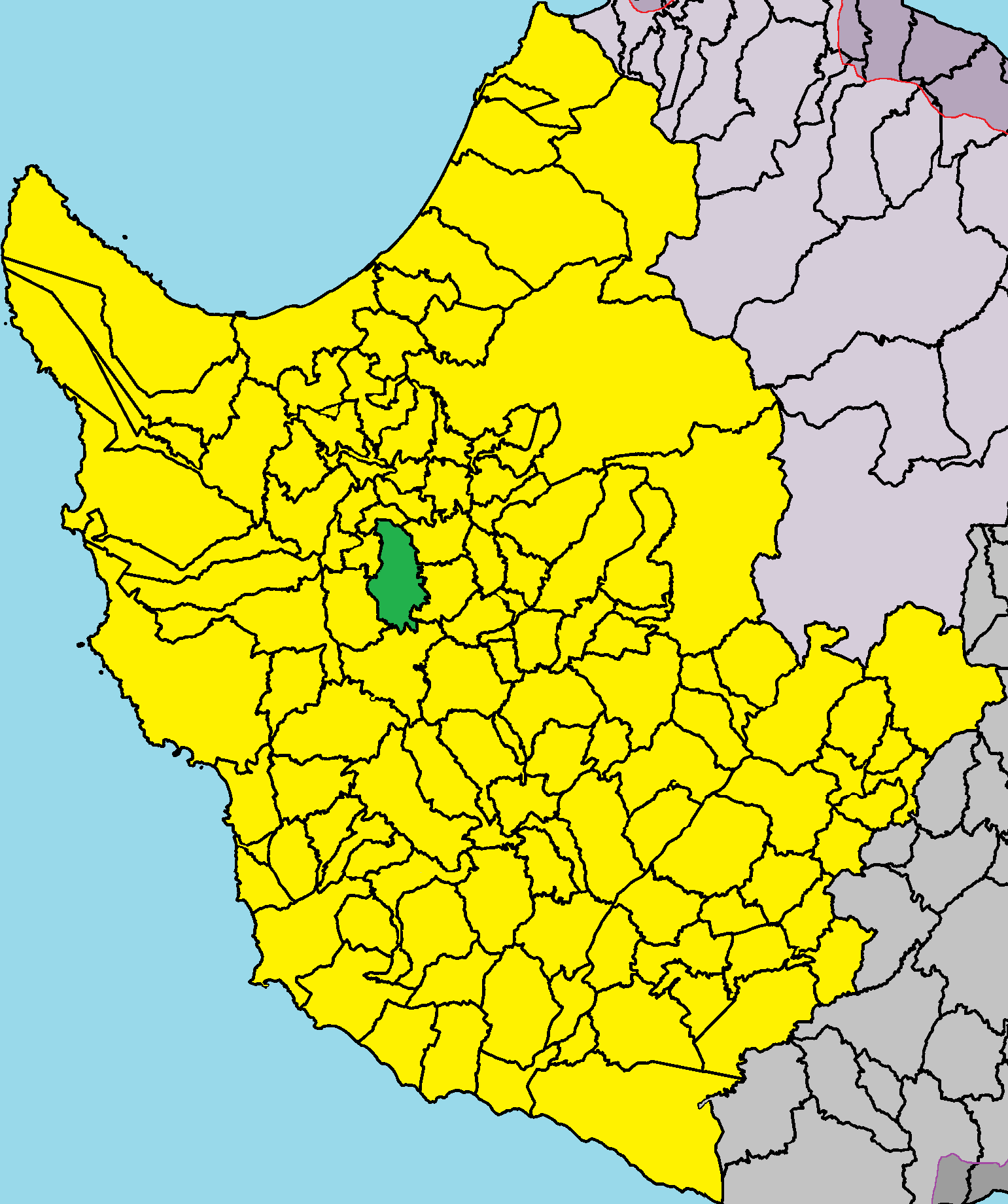

- Location in Cyprus
- Coordinates: 34°55′24″N 32°28′28″E
- Country: Cyprus
- District: Paphos District
- Elevation: 305 m (1,001 ft)

Population (2001)
  - Total: 737
- Time zone: UTC+2 (EET)
  - Summer (DST): UTC+3 (EEST)
- Postal code: 6331

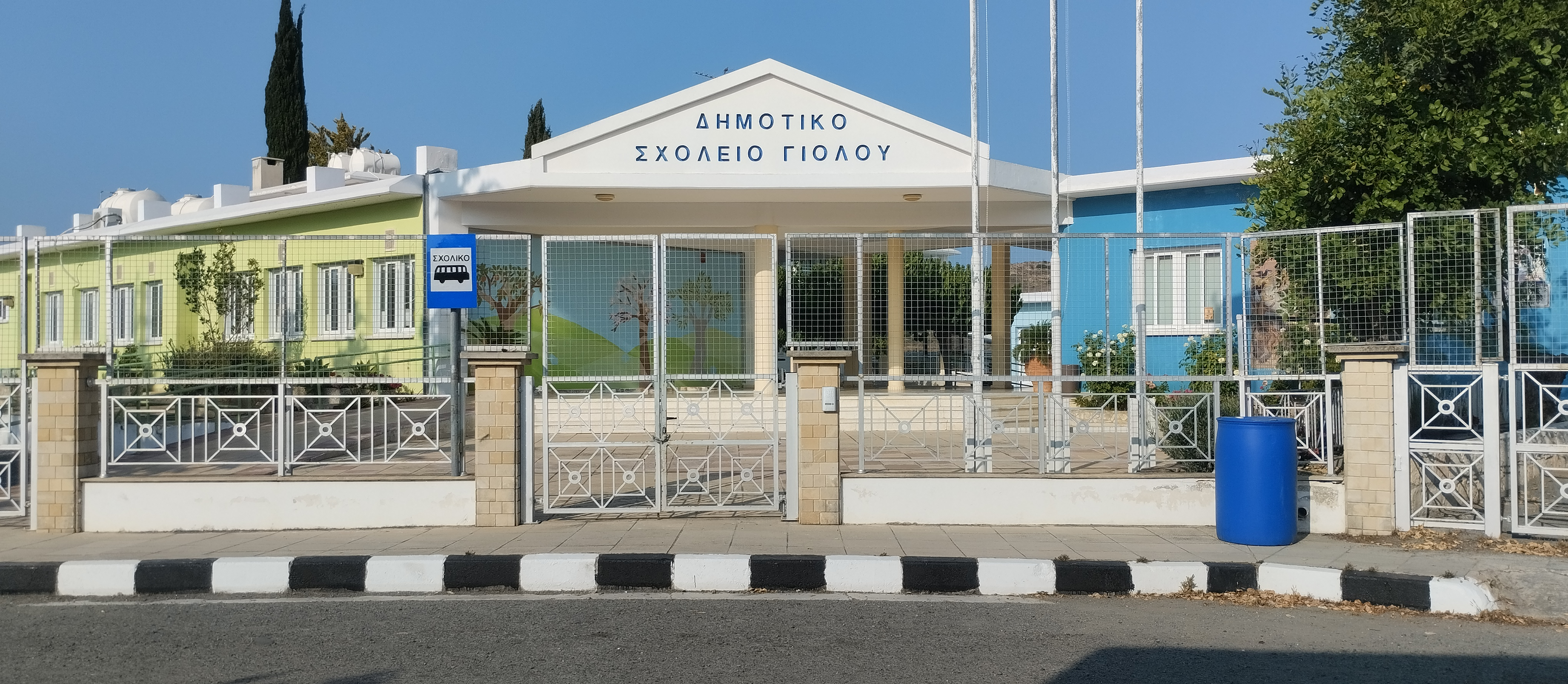
Local school in Giolou

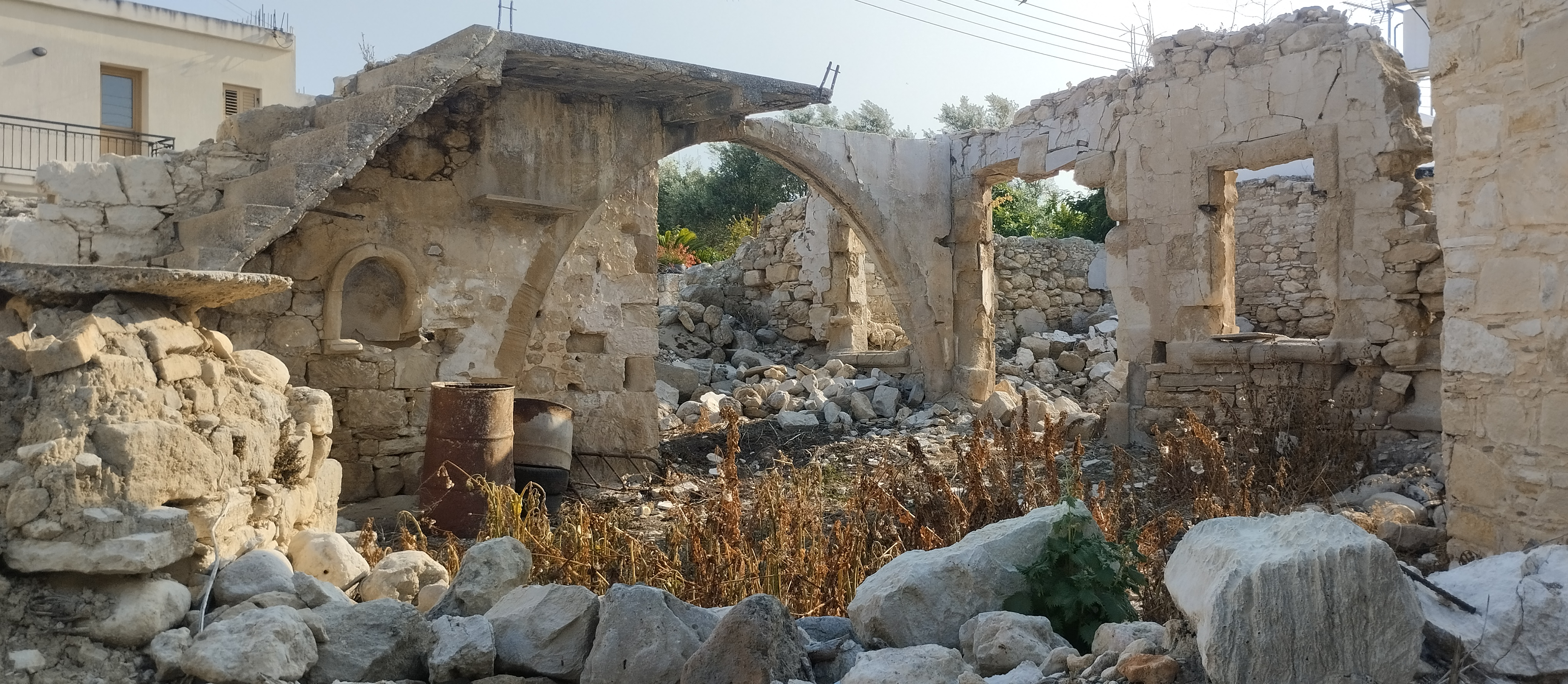
Ruin in Giolou

Giolou (Greek: Γιόλου) is a village in the Paphos District of Cyprus, located 20 km North of Paphos and 15 km South of Polis Chrysochous. At an altitude of about 300 meters from the sea, the settlement of Giolou is connected to the southwest and north to the main road that leads to Polis Chrysochous and Latsi, which in fact led to the identification of its name with the Turkish Cypriot word “yiol” (which means road) and later with the wind god, Aeolus. The most prevalent version for the origins of its name, however, mentions the name of the feudal owner who had the village in his possession during the Byzantine era or during the period of the Frankish rule.

It borders with Loukrounou, Simou, Drymou, Stroumbi, Theletra and Miliou villages.

The village is mentioned by the historians from the Byzantine and Frankish periods.

The village is also known as the “fox village” because the residents used to hunt foxes for a living.

== Topography ==
Giolou is located 305 m (1,001 ft) above sea level.

== Entertainment ==
Evretou Dam is a local favourite for fishermen. Tsada golf course is a favourite for golfers.

== Sports ==
The Giolou football stadium is often used to host plays, festivals, and even football matches. Giolou has its own football academy, and the local team was recently combined with the team at Mesogi to become United Athletic. The team is currently in the third division.
