= Loukrounou =

Loukrounou Λουκρούνου Olukönü
- Location in Cyprus
- Coordinates: 34°57′8″N 32°27′52″E
- Country: Cyprus
- District: Paphos District
- Elevation: 210 m (690 ft)

Population (2001)
  - Total: 0
- Time zone: UTC+2 (EET)
  - Summer (DST): UTC+3 (EEST)

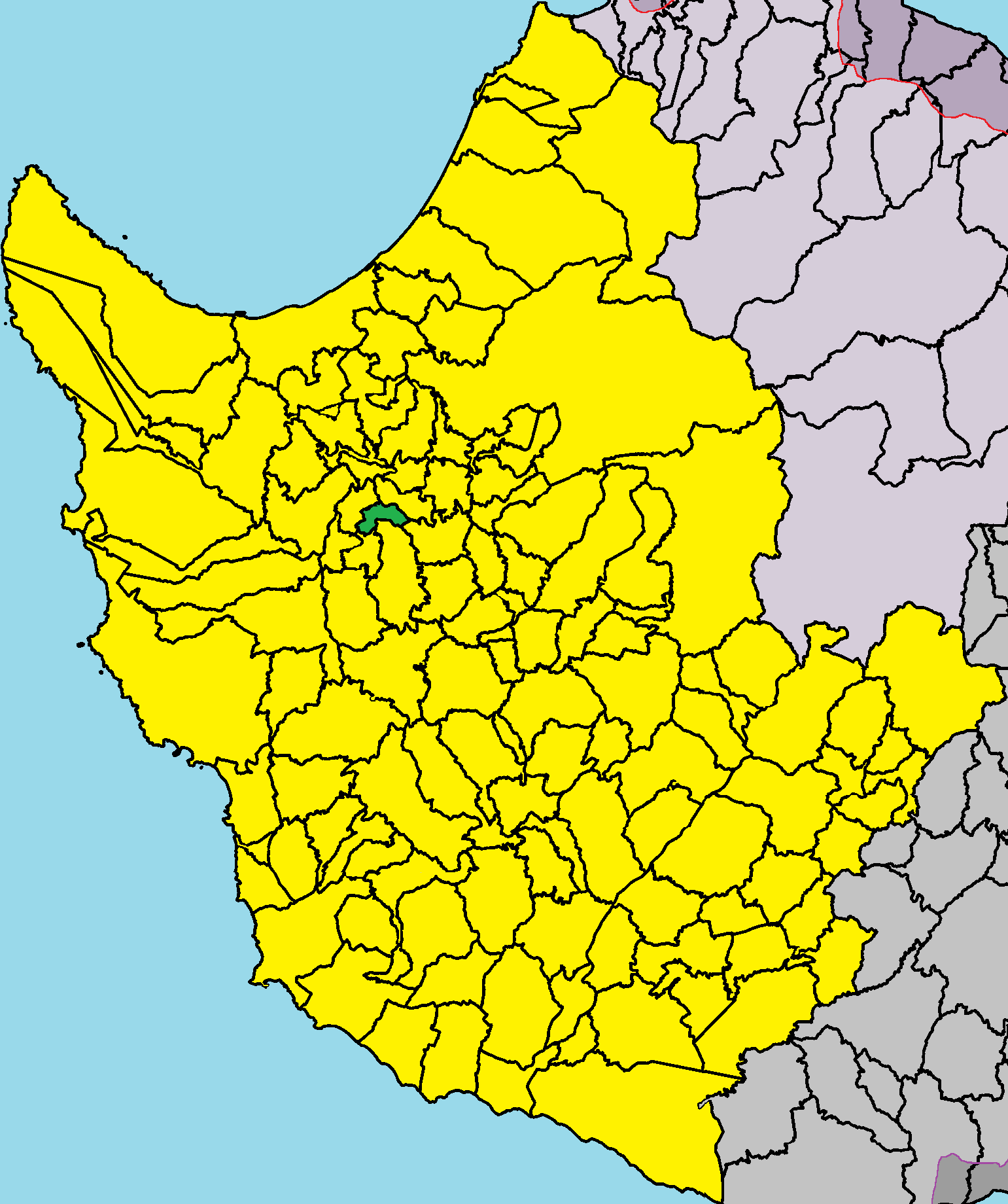
Loukrounou in the Paphos District

Loukrounou (Greek: Λουκρούνου, Turkish: Olukönü) is an abandoned small Turkish Cypriot village in the Paphos District of Cyprus, located 3 km north of Miliou and 25 km north of the city of Paphos. The village existed during the Fankish Period and on maps of that era it's noted as Lucrumu or Lucrunu and sometimes as Licrinu. During the Middle Ages the village was probably larger. It is mentioned, however, that its inhabitants had been percecuted by the Franks and later by the Ottomans, for reasons which are not known today. In 1960 it had 35 inhabitants.

== Topography ==
Loukrounou is located next to the Lake of Evretou, and it is easily reached in the direction of the villages, Miliou and Giolou. Loukrounou is situated 210 m above sea level and receives an average annual rainfall of around 600 millimeters. Before it was abandoned by its inhabitants, vines of wine varieties and cereals were cultivated in the village. Near Loukrounou there is the Kouyiouka Watermill which has been renovated to its former glory.

== Historical Population ==
According to the census reports, Loukrounou was always solely inhabited by Turkish Cypriots. During the British period the population of the village fluctuated and eventually declined. In 1881 its population was 50 which increased to 67 in 1891, decreased to 55 in 1901, increased to 67 in 1911, decreased to 34 in 1921, increased to 36 in 1931, to 39 in 1946 but it fell to 35 in 1960.

== Naming ==
Loukrounou is a small hamlet located ten kilometers south of Polis and two kilometers north of Miliou. The origin of the name is obscure. it seems that its original Greek name, of the Byzantine period, was altered by the Franks and we do not know exactly what it was. It's possible that it was called (Greek: Κρουνός, romanized: Krounos) which is a pipe that drains large quantities of water. The Franks added the prefix Le Krounos, and eventually it became Loukrounou. In 1958 the Turkish Cypriots adopted the alternative name Olukönü, meaning “in front of the drain pipe.” It is likely that they chose this name to correspond with its original Greek name.
