= Philousa Khrysokhous =

Philousa Chrysochous Φιλούσα Χρυσοχούς
- Location in Cyprus
- Coordinates: 34°58′26″N 32°30′17″E
- Country: Cyprus
- District: Paphos District
- Elevation: 1,401 ft (427 m)

Population (2011)
  - Total: 31
- Time zone: UTC+2 (EET)
  - Summer (DST): UTC+3 (EEST)
- Postal code: 6315

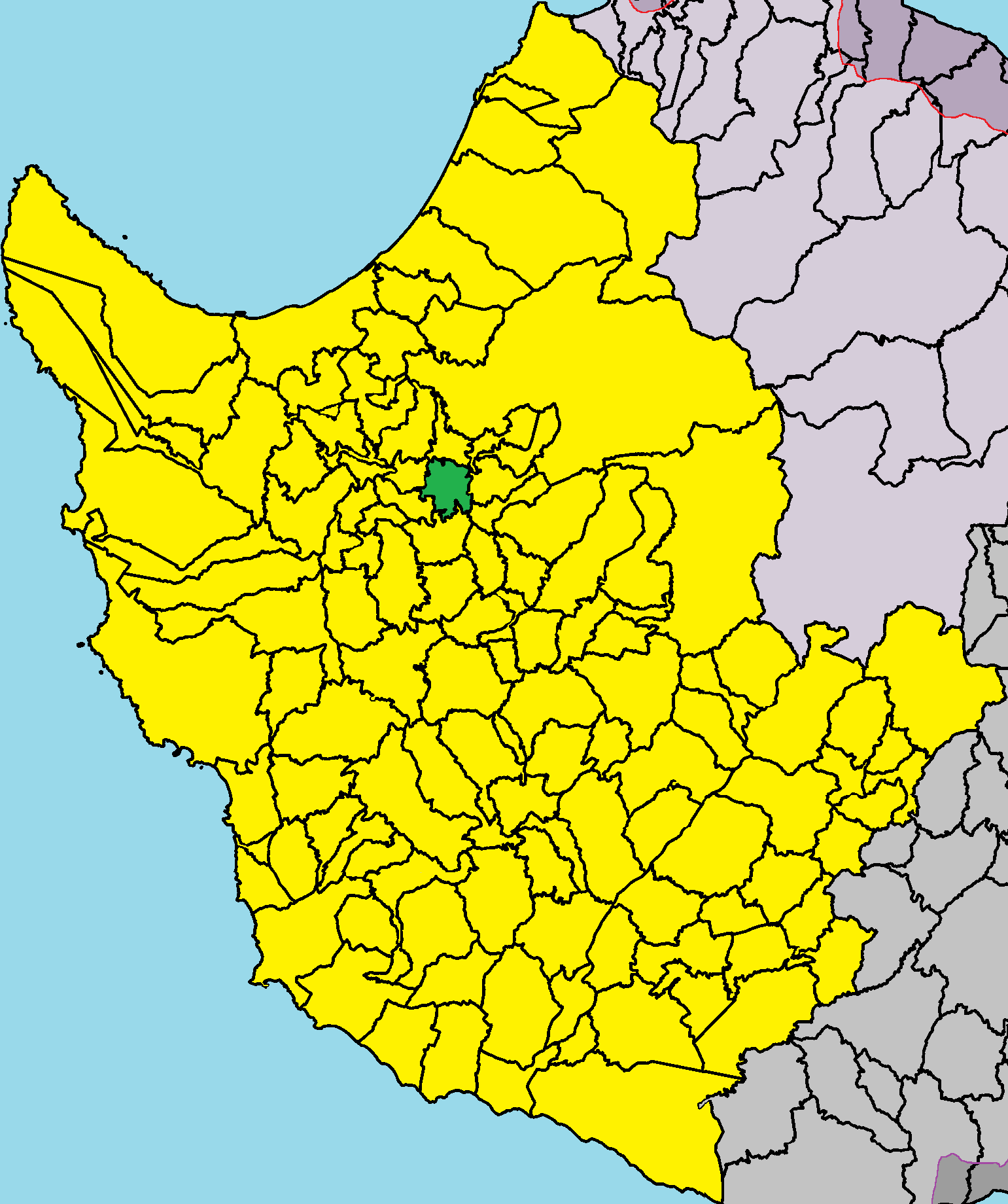
Map showing Philousa Khrysokhous in Paphos District.

Philousa Chrysochous (Greek: Φιλούσα Χρυσοχούς) is a village in the Paphos District of Cyprus, located 12 km southeast of Polis Chrysochous. Is located at 427 metres (1,401 ft) above sea level. Located next to Lake Evretos, Filousa Chrysochous is adjacent to the village of Tremithousa of Paphos and is one of the small communities of the island, but it has many of the natural beauties of the Cypriot countryside. Specifically, the settlement is built on a green hillside with carob trees, olive and fruit trees, and overlooks from above the villages of the area. The village lies close to Simou, Zacharia and Sarama Village. The two abandoned villages of Evretou and Trimithousa are also nearby. Filousa Village was at one at the centre of 5 surrounding Turkish Cypriot villages in the area.

The population of Filousa Village has 31 permanent residents, with the village becoming busier at the weekends during festivals and the holiday periods. Filousa Village is spread along a main road, with a few narrow streets leading off. The nearby town of Polis Chrysochou is the main administration, school and medical centre for the village.

The Filousa Village in this article is not to be confused with the Filousa Village which lies further south near Kedares Village.

According to legend, the village acquired its name from two trees that grew by the town square. The pair grew to be very large, eventually entwining. This gave the appearance as though they were kissing and the village became known as Filousa Village (translation: Kissing Village).

Filousa Village has magnificent views, and has managed to keep its traditional architecture and charm.
