= Bosea =

Bosea may refer to:

- Bosea (bacterium), a genus of bacteria in the order Hyphomicrobiales
- Bosea (plant), a genus of plants in the family Amaranthaceae
- Bosea (Loan), in Ghana is the local name for loans
