= Meladeia =

Meladeia Μελάδεια
- Location in Cyprus
- Coordinates: 34°59′17″N 32°30′25″E
- Country: Cyprus
- District: Paphos District

Population (2001)
  - Total: 19
- Time zone: UTC+2 (EET)
  - Summer (DST): UTC+3 (EEST)
- Postal code: 6318

Meladeia (Greek: Μελάδεια) is a village in the Paphos District of Cyprus, located 2 km southwest of Lysos.

In the direction of the Paphos forest, the visitor will come across Medeladeia, one of the small settlements of Magnolia, surrounded by the villages of Lysos, Peristerona Paphos and Melandra.

In the wider area of Meladeia there are many accommodations, while in the sparsely populated settlement there is still a ruined mosque, a living proof of the settlement's history.

== Elevation ==
Meladeia has an elevation of 545 m above sea level.
