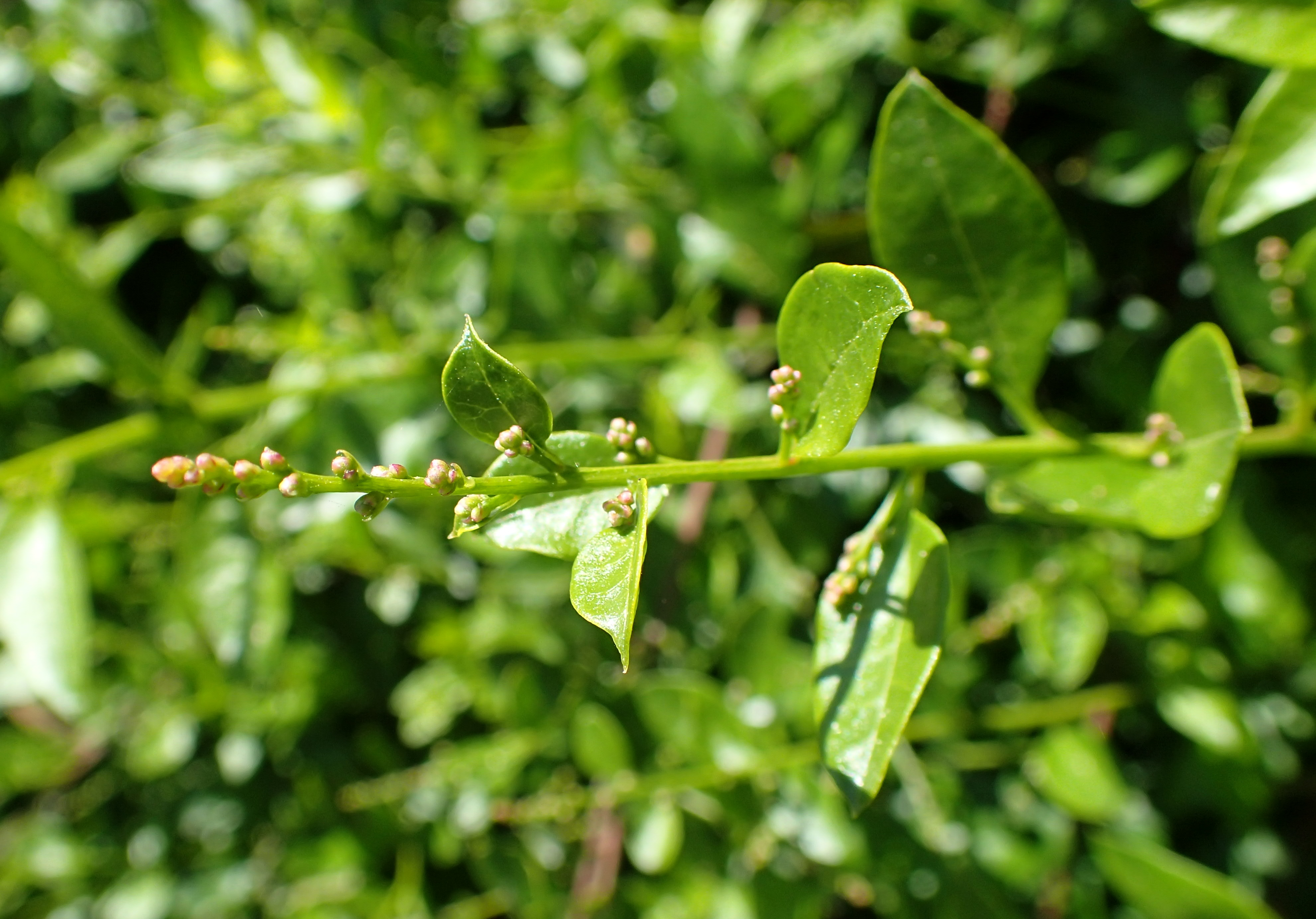
- Bosea cypria

Scientific classification
- Kingdom: Plantae
- Clade: Tracheophytes
- Clade: Angiosperms
- Clade: Eudicots
- Order: Caryophyllales
- Family: Amaranthaceae
- Genus: Bosea
- Species: B. cypria

Binomial name
- Bosea cypria Boiss. ex Hook.f.

= Bosea cypria =

Species of plant in the amaranth family

Bosea cypria is a species of flowering plant in the Amaranthaceae family. It is a highly branched, evergreen shrub, 1–2 m (3.3–6.6 ft) high, erect, suberect, or hanging on walls, cliffs or trees, with hairless angular shoots. Leaves, opposite, simple, entire-+ elliptical, 2-6 x (1-2-3) cm, hairless, petiolate, dark green, occasionally red green. Flowers in branched spikes, hermaphrodite or unisexual 5-merous, very small, green brown, the floral symmetry is actinomorphic. The fruit is a globose red berry. Flowers from April to July. It is endemic to Cyprus and in the local Greek Cypriot dialect it is called ζουλατζιά (translit: zoulatzia)

== Habitat ==
It grows on rocky limestone banks, cliffs, old walls or gulleys, from sea level to 600 m (2,000 ft).

== Distribution ==
Endemic to Cyprus. Akamas (Avakas, Kouphes etc.), Kritou Terra, Peyia, Lysos, Theletra, Mesoyi, Kato Paphos, Pakhyammos, Episkopi, Limassol, Potamos Liopetriou, Protaras, Dhiorios, Pentadaktylos, Rizokarpaso.

== Cultivation ==
It has mostly been planted in hedges.

== Gallery ==
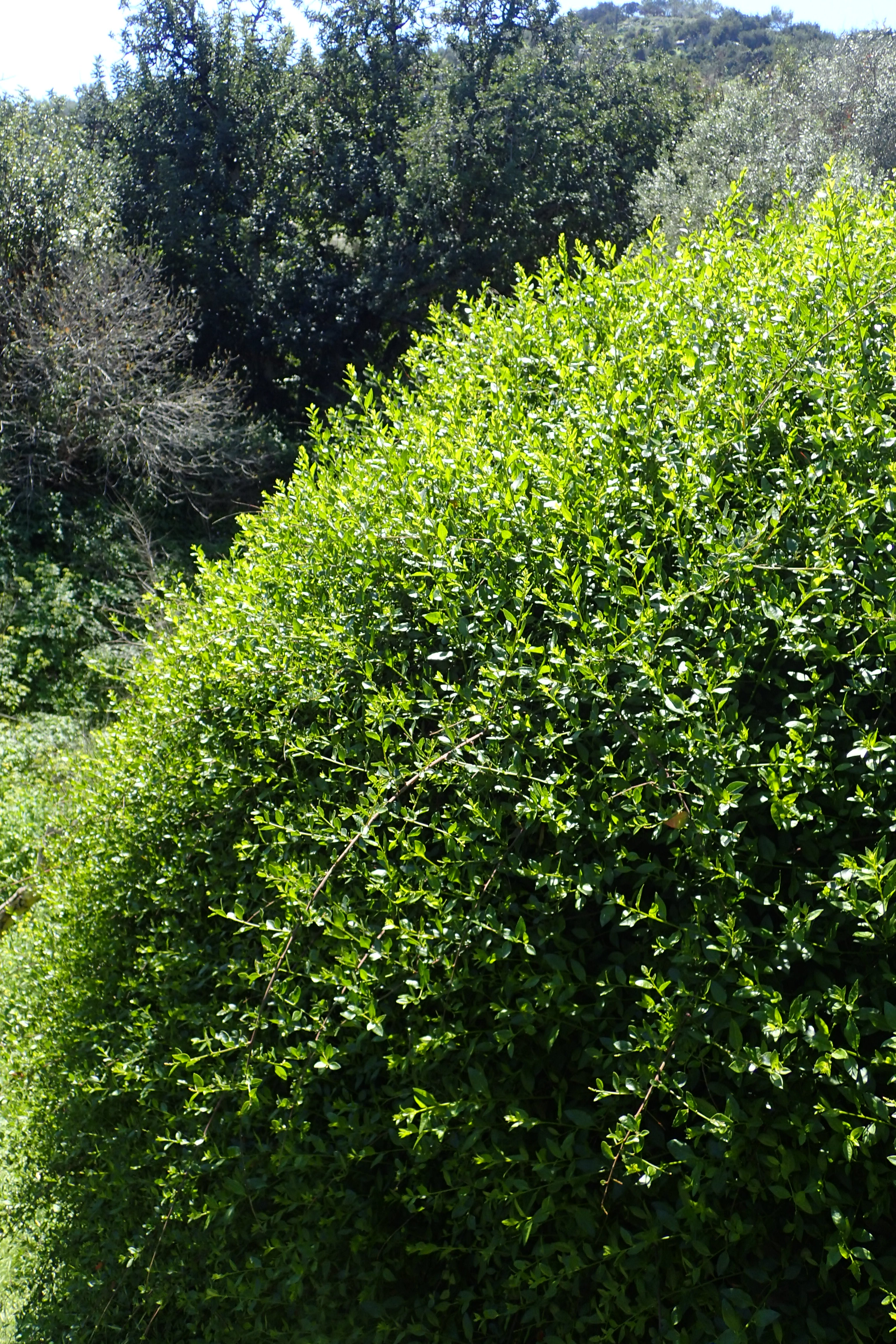
Bosea cypria in Akamas Botanical Garden, Cyprus

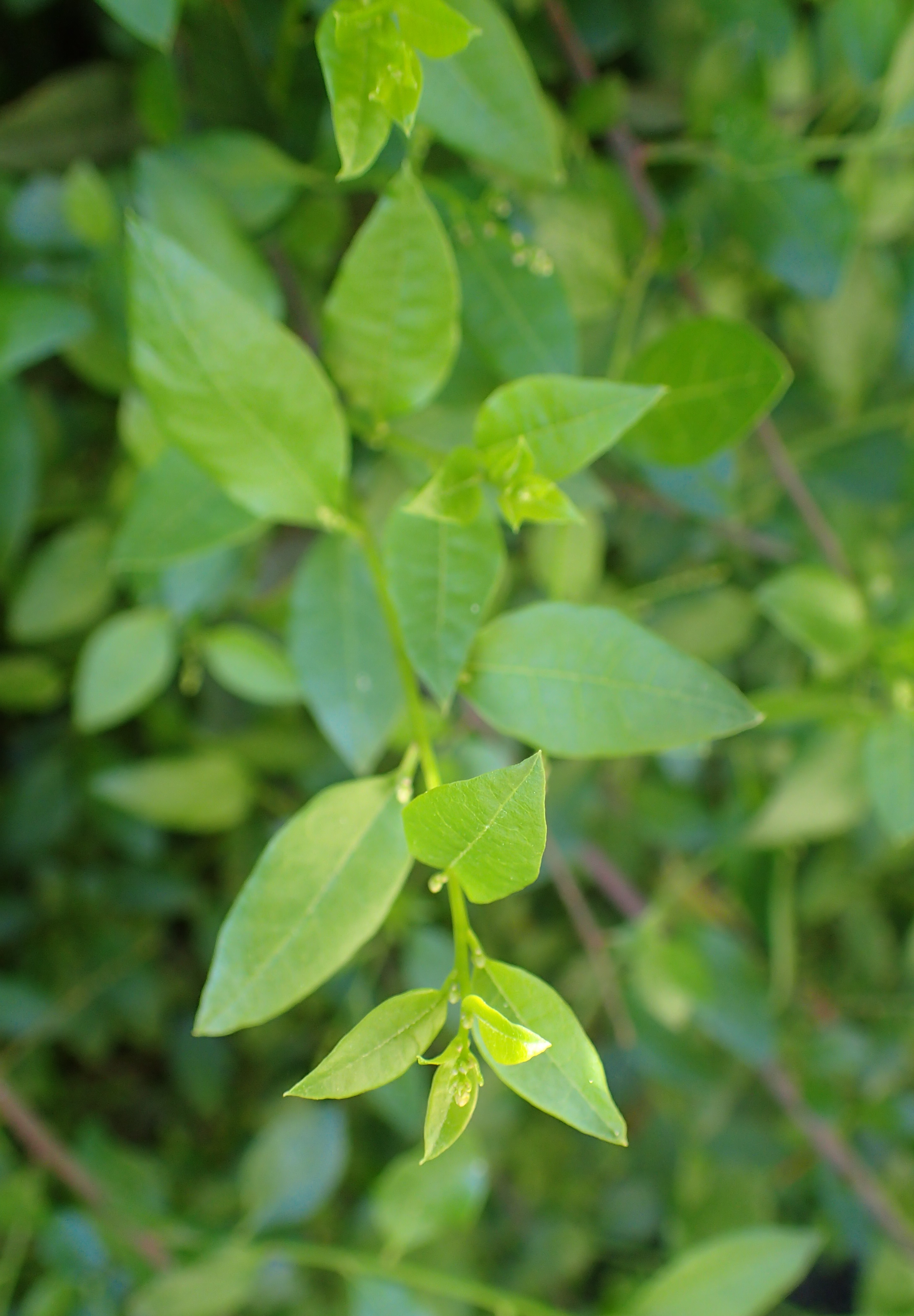
Branch

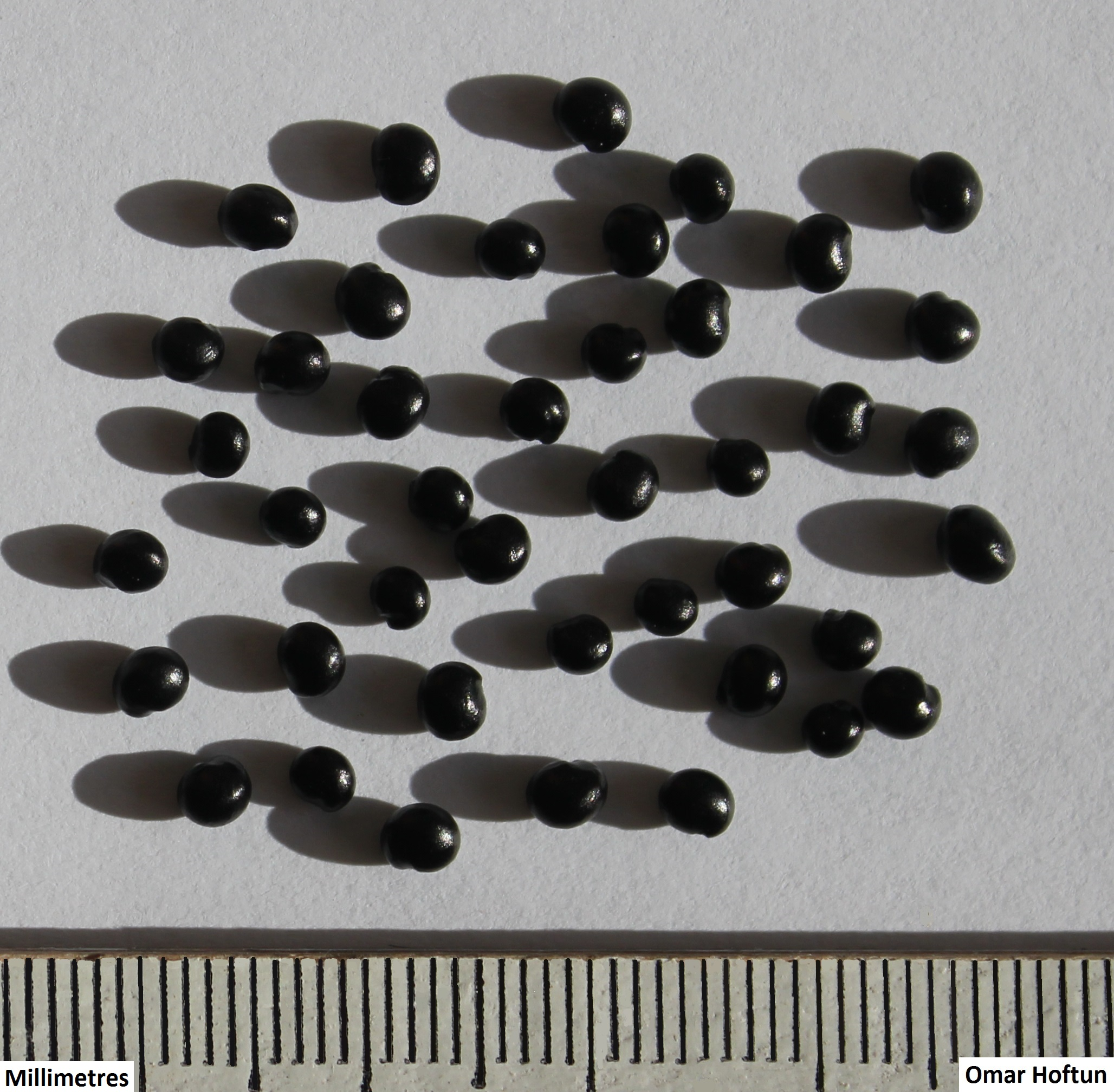
Seeds of Bosea cypria

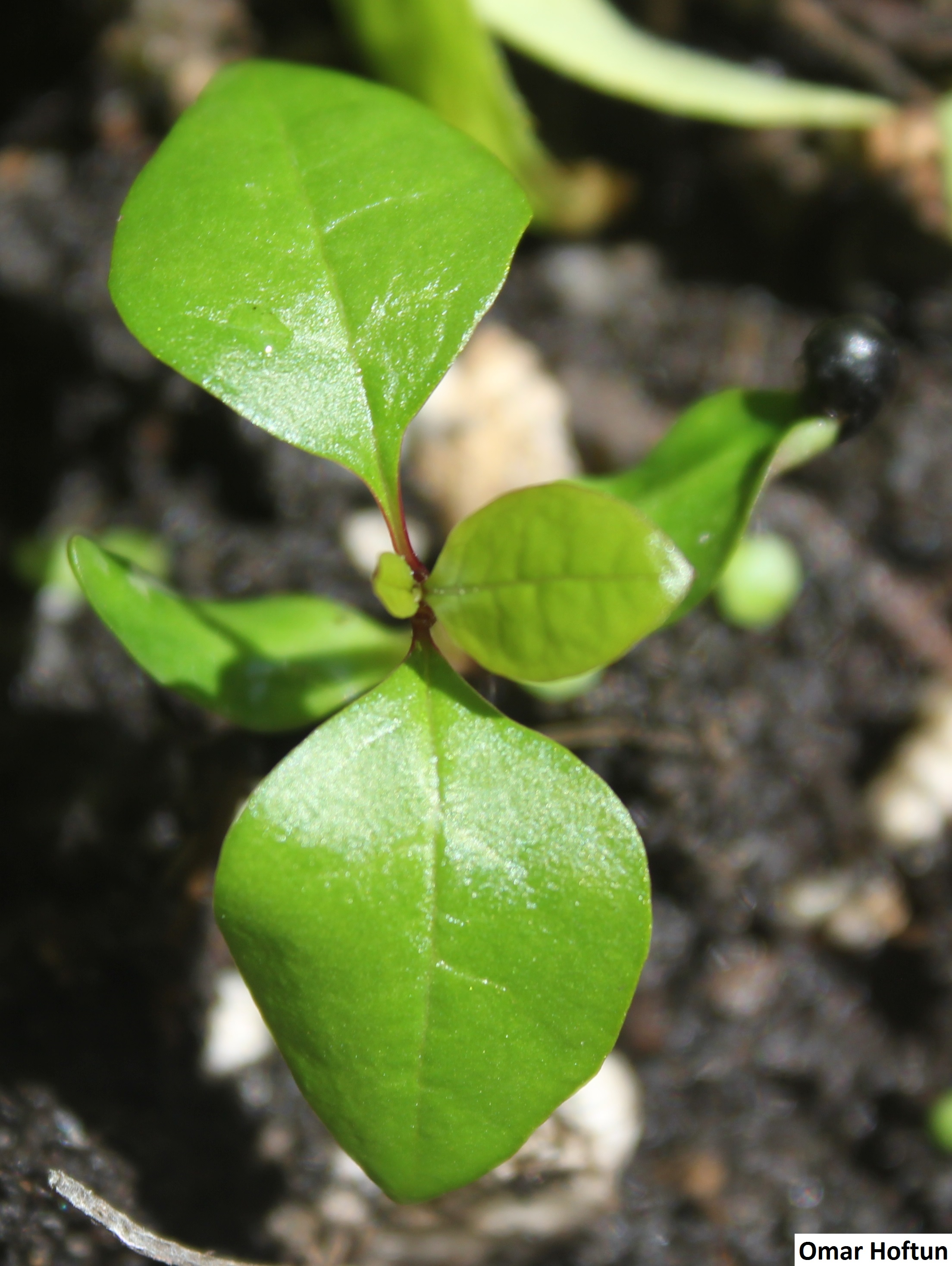
Bosea cypria seedling

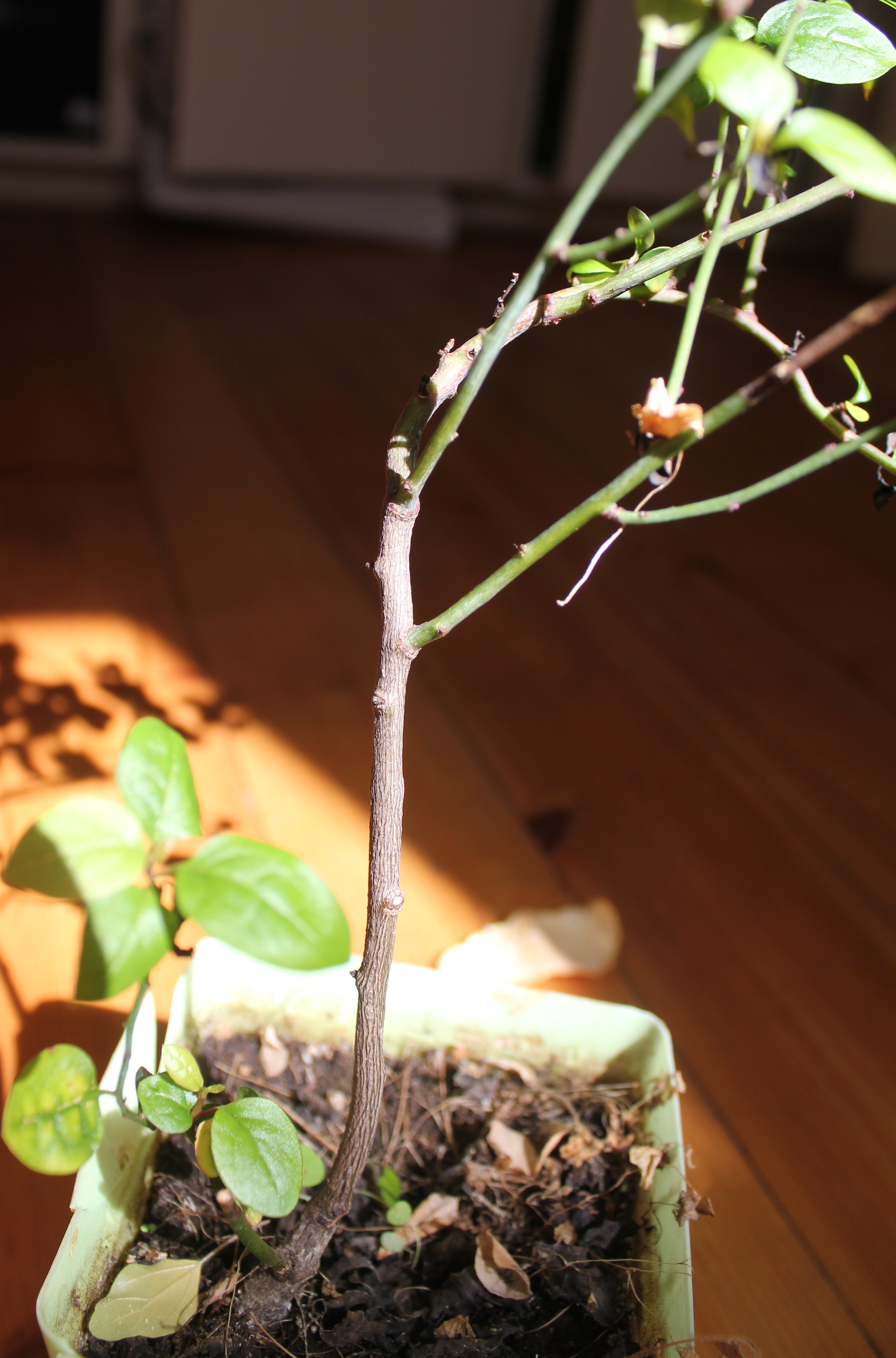
Stem, branches and bark
