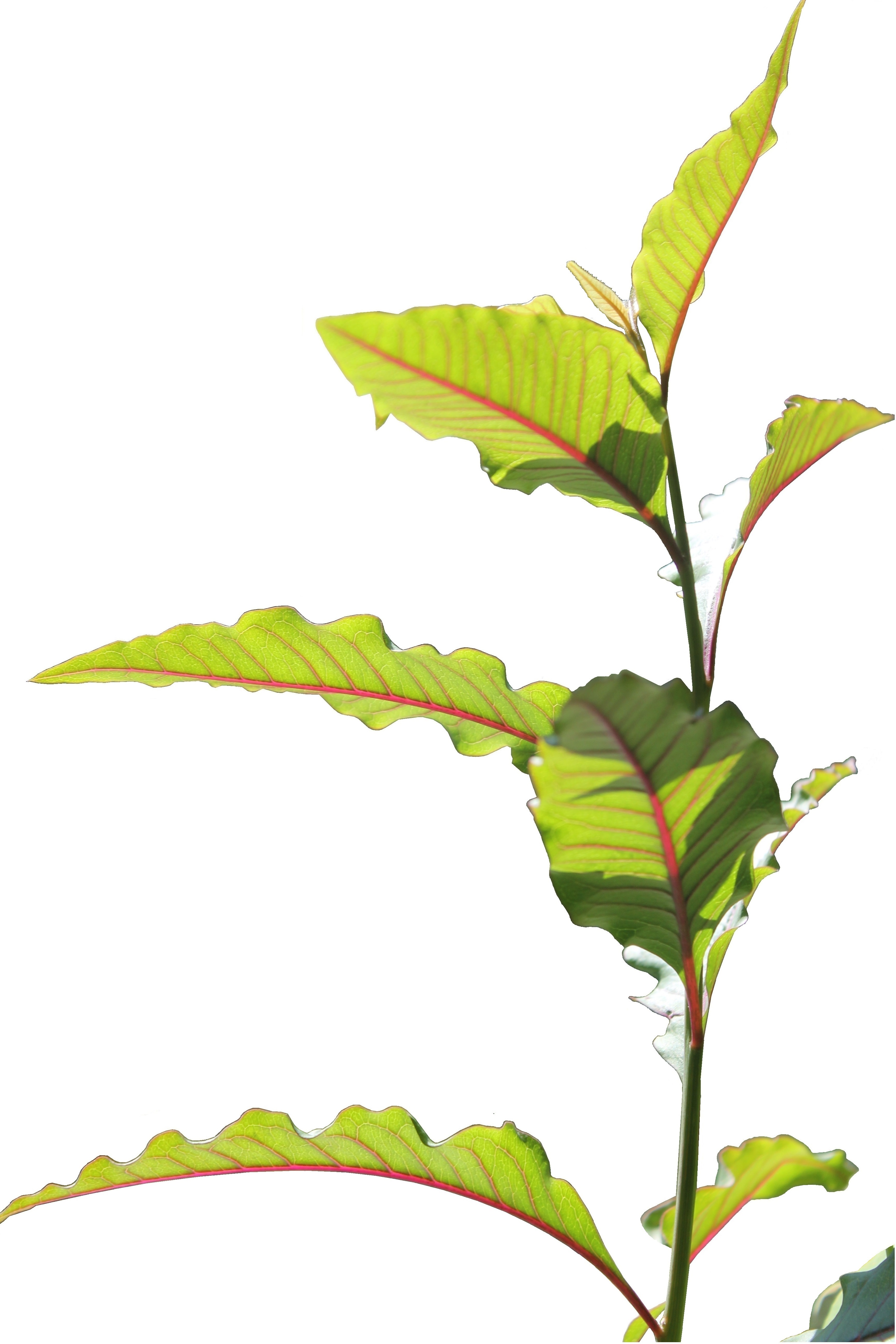

Scientific classification
- Kingdom: Plantae
- Clade: Tracheophytes
- Clade: Angiosperms
- Clade: Eudicots
- Order: Caryophyllales
- Family: Amaranthaceae
- Genus: Bosea
- Species: B. yervamora

Binomial name
- Bosea yervamora L.

= Bosea yervamora =

Species of flowering plant

Bosea yervamora is a shrub native to the Canary Islands, up to 3 m tall with greenish slender branches. Leaves up to 7 cm long, ovate, lanceolate, alternate, short stalked, without hair. Flowers short terminal, arising from the axil of the leaf, indefinite inflorescences, greenish with two membranous, dry modified leaves at the base of the stem. Fruits greenish black turning pink when ripe, about the size of a small pea.

== Distribution ==
In Tenerife it is locally common particularly along the north coast, Barranco Honda Santa Ursula, La Rambla, and Los Silos. In Gran Canaria it is found in the northern part of the island, Tafira, Moya, Agaete, Bandama etc. In La Palma it is distributed in the west coast region, Tazacorte and Santa Cruz. In La Gomera in Barranco dela Villa and Agulo, Vallehermoso, on dry slopes in the lower zone.

== Gallery ==
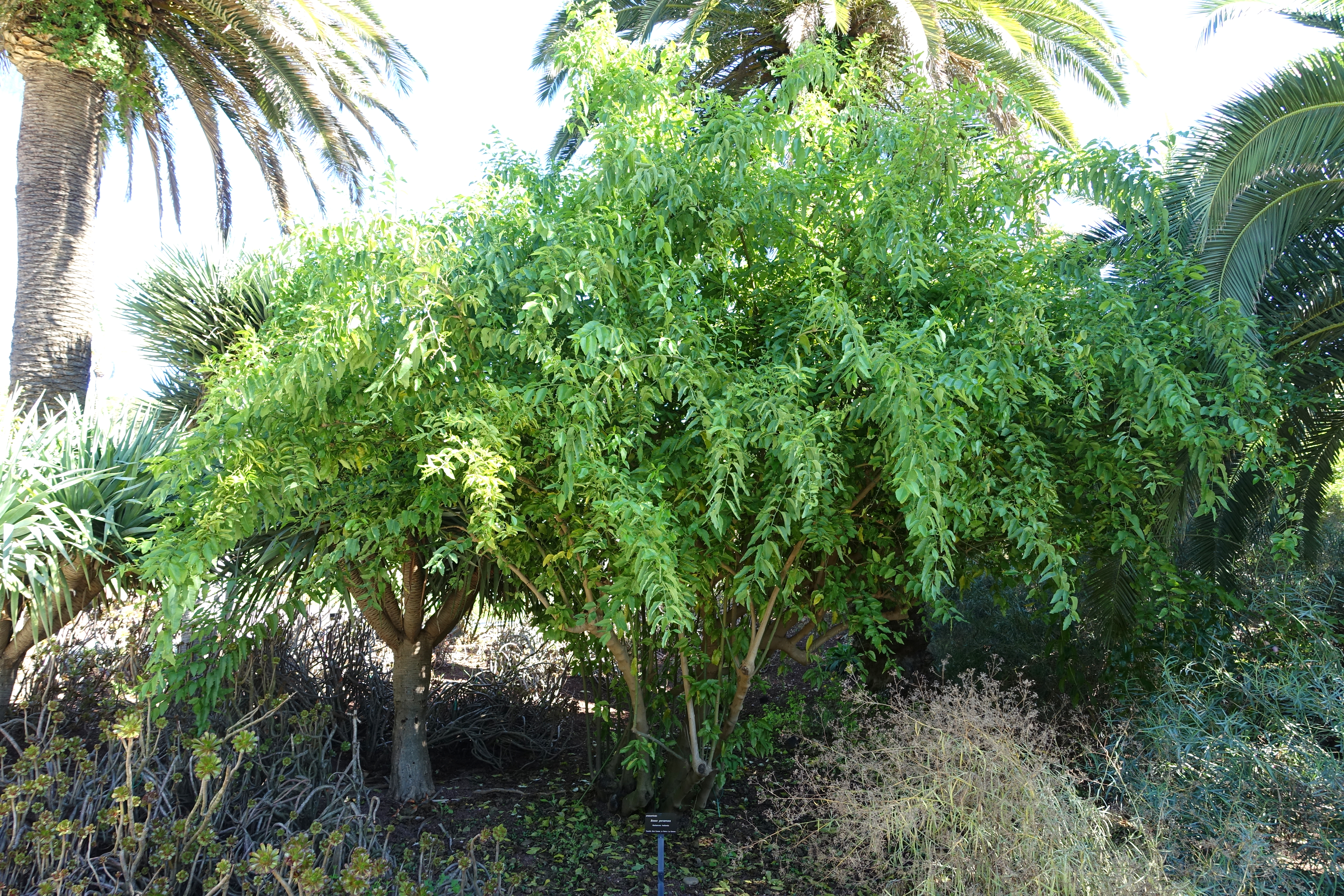
The shape of the shrub

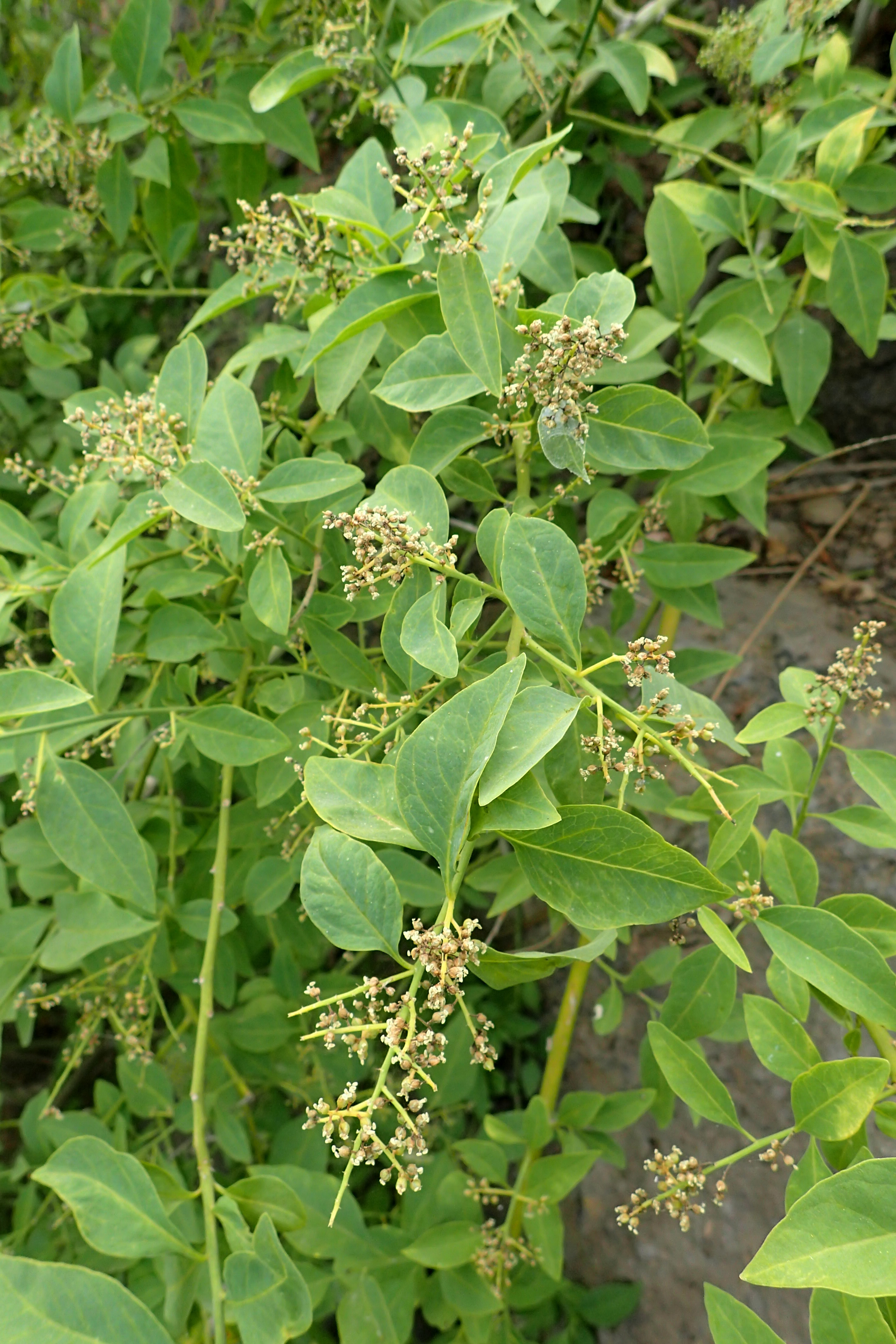
Flowers

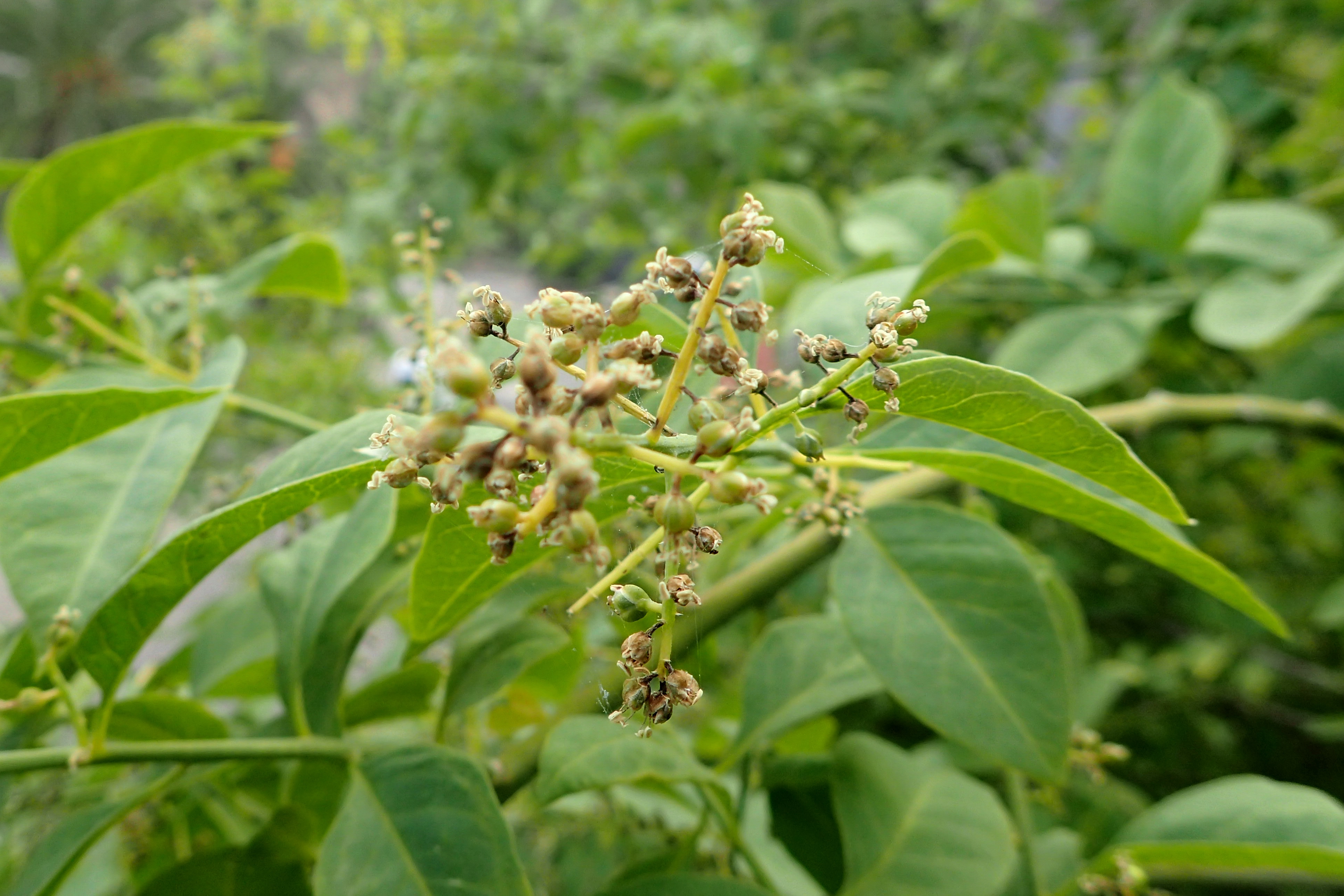
Close up of flowers

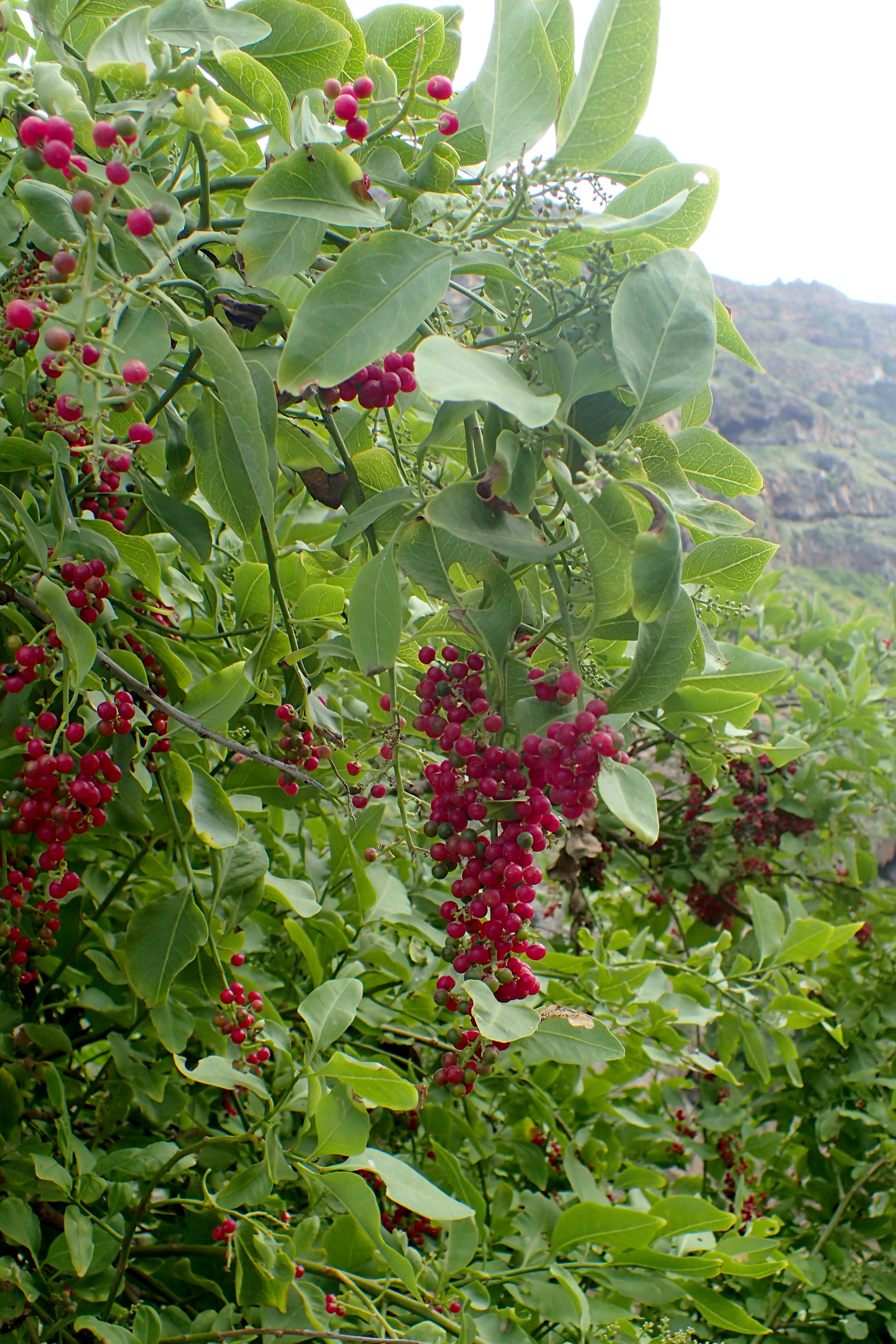
Fruits

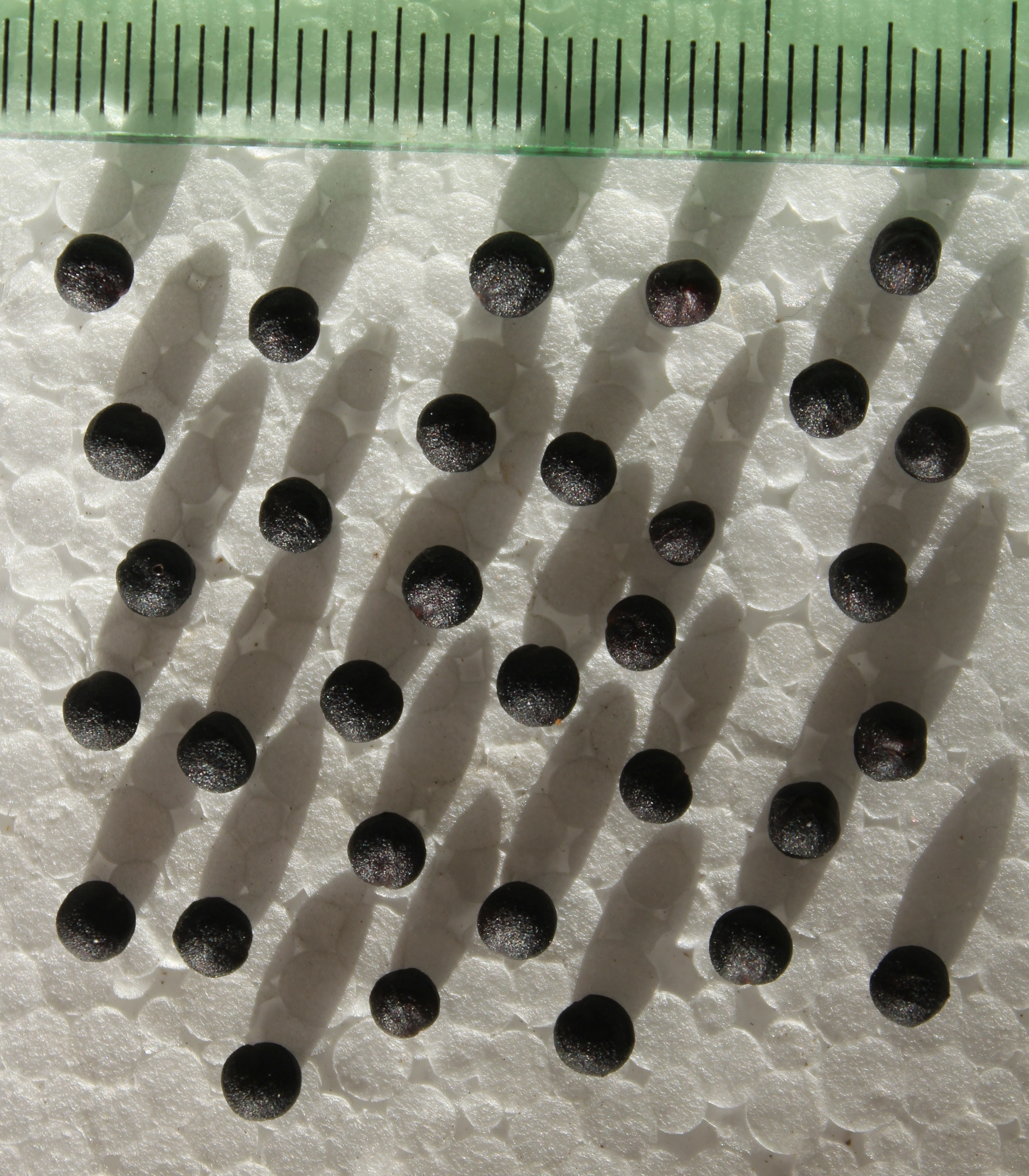
Seeds

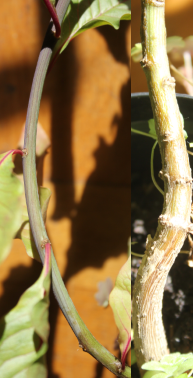
Bark
