= Trimithousa =

Tremithousa Chrysochous Τρεμιθούσα Χρυσοχούς
- Location in Cyprus
- Coordinates: 34°58′27″N 32°29′15″E
- Country: Cyprus
- District: Paphos District

Population (2001)
  - Total: 0
- Time zone: UTC+2 (EET)
  - Summer (DST): UTC+3 (EEST)
- Postal code: 6314
- Climate: Csa

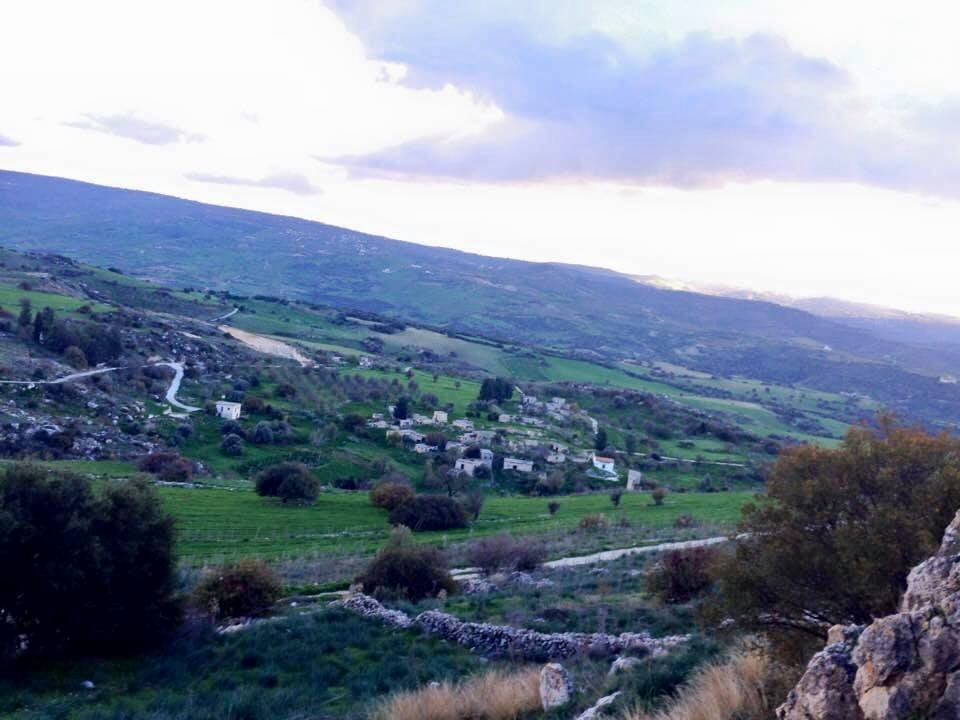
The village of Tremithousa Chrysochous, Paphos, Cyprus

Tremithousa Chrysochous (Greek: Τρεμιθούσα Χρυσοχούς; Turkish: Uzunmeşe or Tremitusa) is an abandoned village in the Paphos District of Cyprus, located 6 km southwest of Lysos and about 11 kilometers southeast of Polis Chrysochous.

A stone's throw from Lake Evretou lies the now abandoned Turkish Cypriot settlement of Tremithousa Chrysochous, which is adjacent to the village of Philousa.
