= Evretou =

Village in Paphos District, Cyprus

Evretou Ευρέτου Dereboyu
- Village
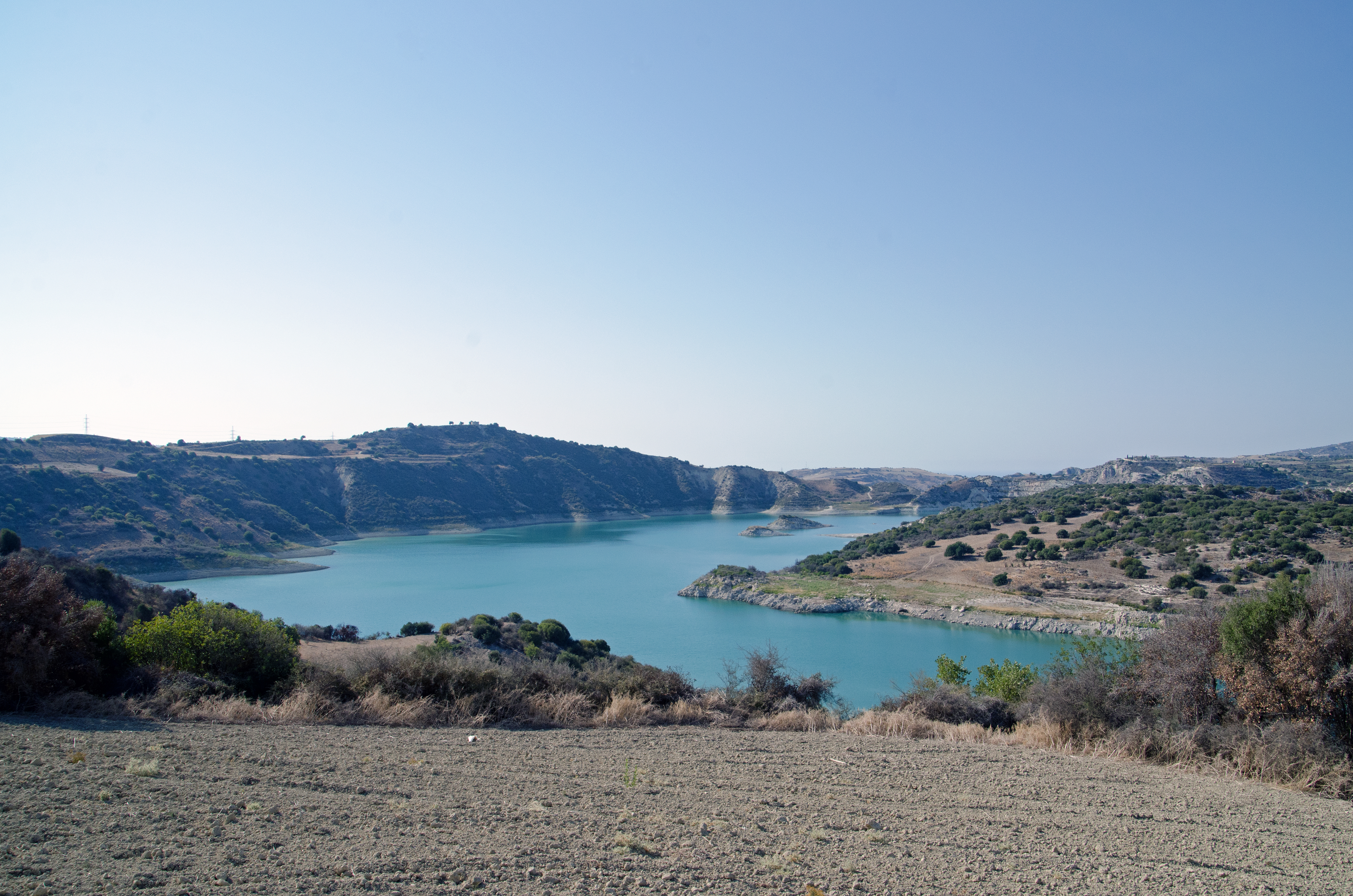
- Evretou Dam

- Location in Cyprus
- Coordinates: 34°57′37″N 32°29′1″E
- Country: Cyprus
- District: Paphos District

Population (2021)
  - Total: 0
- Time zone: UTC+2 (EET)
  - Summer (DST): UTC+3 (EEST)
- Postal code: 6313

Evretou (Greek: Ευρέτου; Turkish: Dereboyu) is an abandoned village in the Paphos District of Cyprus, 6 km (3.7 mi) southwest of Lysos. It sits beside the Evretou Dam and recorded no permanent residents in the 2021 census.

== Etymology ==
The Greek name Evretou means a place where something of value may be found. In 1958, Turkish Cypriots adopted the alternative Turkish name Dereboyu, meaning "along the stream".

== History ==
Before 1974, Evretou was inhabited by Turkish Cypriots, with a population of 125 recorded in 1960. During the intercommunal fighting of 1963–1964, displaced Turkish Cypriots from nearby villages took shelter there. According to geographer Richard Patrick, 22 displaced residents from Loukrounou were still living in Evretou in 1971.

After the 1974 war, almost 50 villagers crossed the Troodos Mountains on foot to reach Northern Cyprus. On 3 September 1975, a United Nations Peacekeeping Force in Cyprus (UNFICYP) convoy escorted the remaining 112 residents to the north.

== Landmarks ==
When the Evretou Dam opened in 1986, its reservoir flooded the lower valley and the village's old corn mill. Most of the stone houses remain in ruins, while the Evretou Mosque was restored in 2014–2015 through a project funded by the European Union and implemented by the United Nations Development Programme (UNDP) and the Technical Committee on Cultural Heritage.
