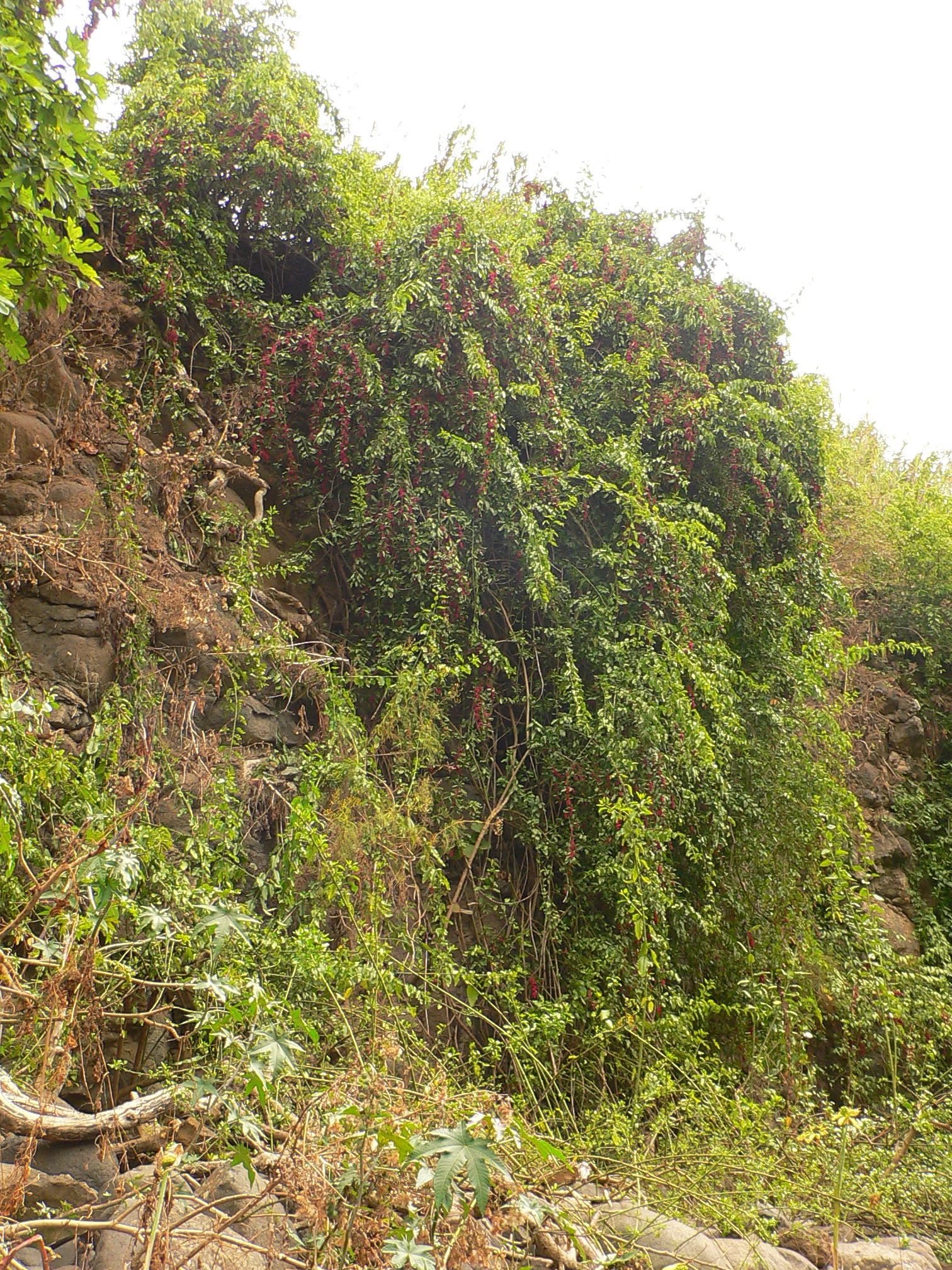
- Bosea yervamora

Scientific classification
- Kingdom: Plantae
- Clade: Tracheophytes
- Clade: Angiosperms
- Clade: Eudicots
- Order: Caryophyllales
- Family: Amaranthaceae
- Subfamily: Amaranthoideae
- Genus: Bosea; L.

Species
- See text

= Bosea (plant) =

Genus of flowering plants

Bosea is a genus of evergreen, woody shrubs contains 3 species that are geographically widely separated; one in the Canary Islands, one in Cyprus and one in the western Himalayas. The species have many crowded cane-like stems from ground level grow to medium to tall shrubs, smallish simple leaves with smooth margins, and tiny white-to-green flowers in branched spikes at end of branches. The fruits are small berries, which have varied local uses as food plants and in traditional medicine.

== Cultivation ==
Although rarely found in cultivation they are easily grown in any well-drained soil in full sun or warm sheltered position in climates from cool temperate to temperate. They re-sprout vigorously after being cut back and can be grown as an ornamental or informal kind of hedge. They can be propagated from cuttings, seed or root division.

== Species ==
The three species in the genus:

- Bosea amherstiana
- Bosea cypria
- Bosea yervamora
