= Miliou =

Miliou Μηλιού
- Location within Cyprus
- Coordinates: 34°56′N 32°28′E
- Country: Cyprus
- District: Paphos District
- Elevation: 252 m (827 ft)

Population (2001)
  - Total: 81
- Time zone: UTC+2 (EET)
  - Summer (DST): UTC+3 (EEST)

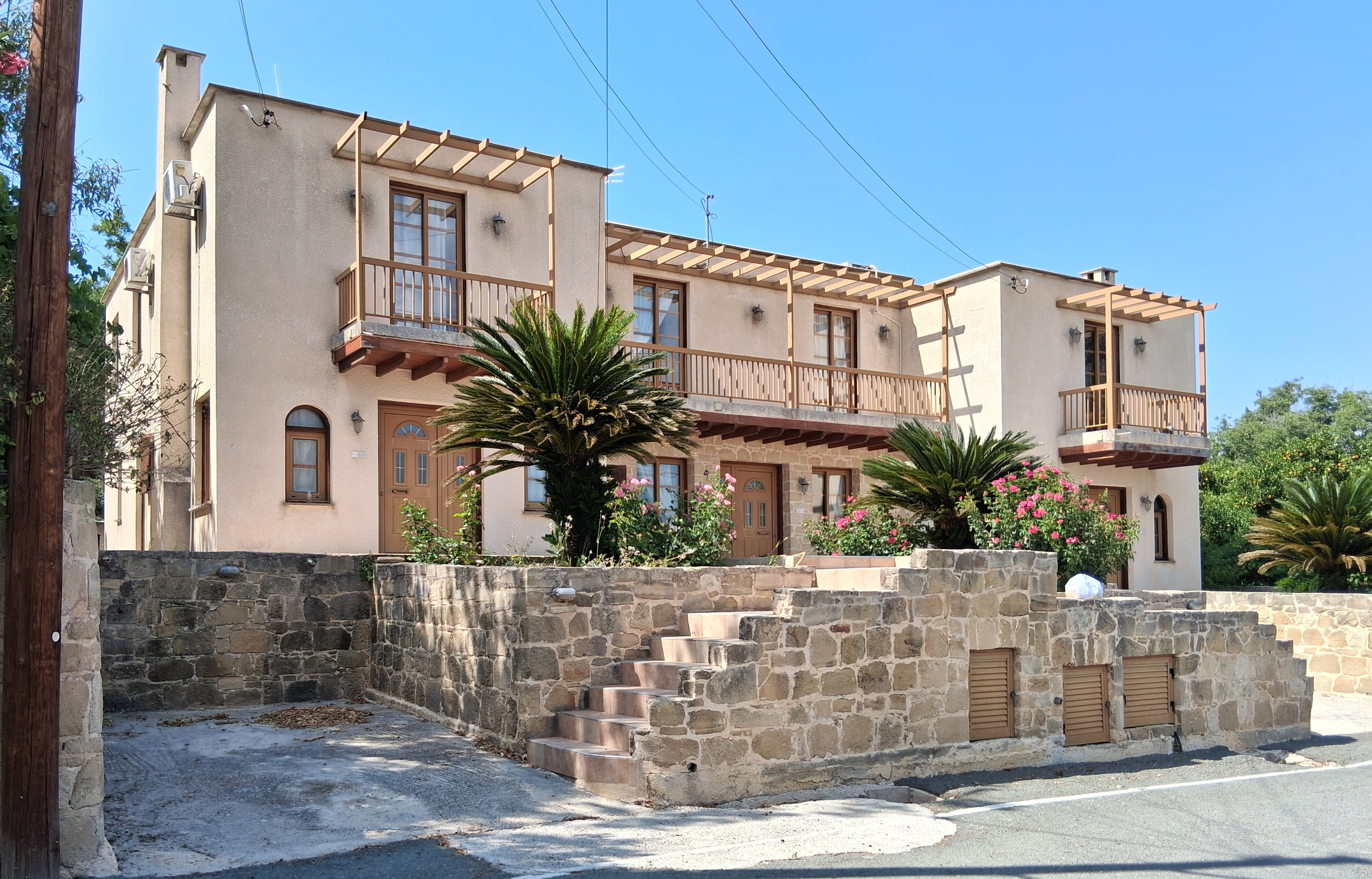
Local house in Miliou

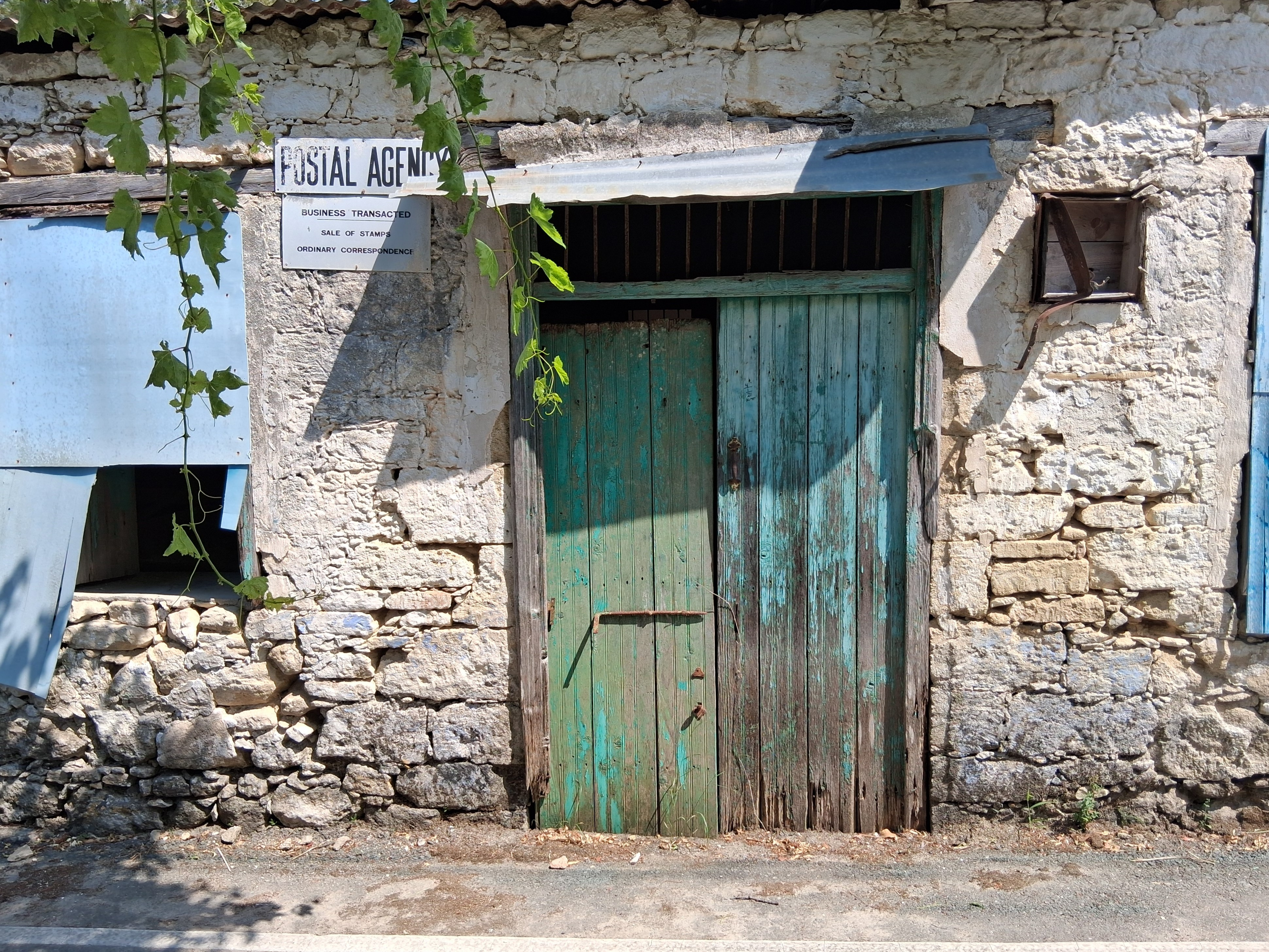
Abandoned house in Miliou

Miliou (Greek language: Μηλιού) is a village on the island of Cyprus, situated on the Laona plateau near the road from Paphos to Polis. Miliou is one of the smallest villages in Cyprus and has a population of about 60. It is also one of the greenest villages in the area, thanks to an abundant supply of spring water, surrounded by citrus groves, almond trees and vineyards.

Miliou is one of the villages involved in the Laona Project, a non-profit organisation established to implement rural regeneration and ecotourism and to help introduce the concept of agrotourism to Cyprus. Although Miliou's limestone houses are examples of traditional rural architecture, more have been restored in the traditional Cypriot style through the Laona Project.

The village is home to the restored monastery of 'Agii Anargyri, now used as a spa hotel. The monastery was built in 1649 and was among the first to be built on the island. It was founded by two brothers who cared for the sick and dying without payment, leading to the monastery acquiring its name, from the Greek meaning "without payment".
