= Evretou Dam =

Evretou dam
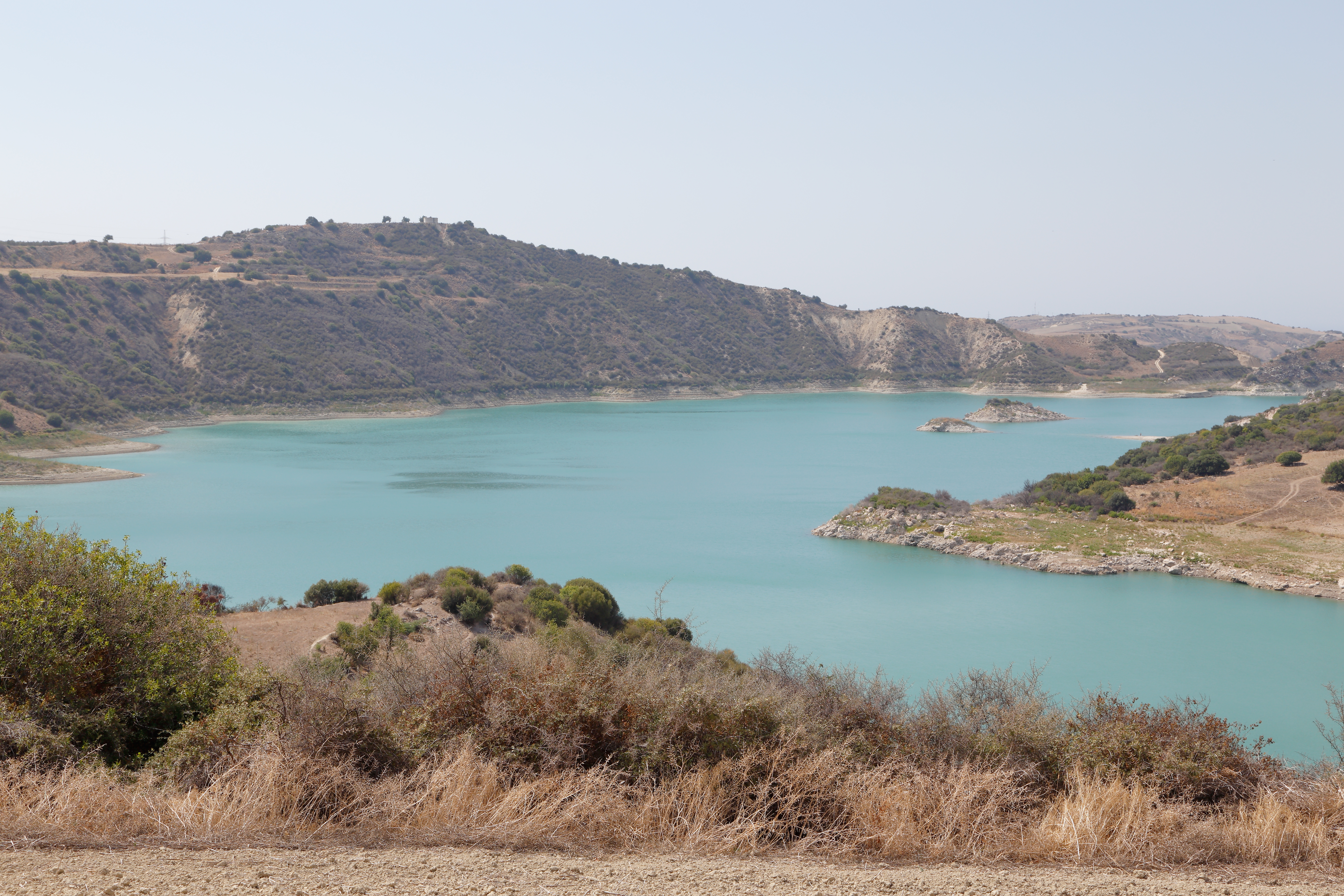

- Location within Cyprus
- Interactive map of Evretou dam
- Official name: Evretou dam Φράγμα Ευρέτου
- Country: Cyprus
- Location: Evretou
- Coordinates: 34.96°N 32.47°E
- Purpose: Irrigation
- Status: Operational
- Opening date: 1986
- Construction cost: CYP £18,000,000
- Built by: Shephard Hill - Zachariades Joint Venture
- Designed by: Sir William Halcrow and Partners
- Owner: Republic of Cyprus
- Operator: Water Development Department of Cyprus

Dam and spillways
- Type of dam: Rock-fill dam
- Impounds: Stavros tis Psokas river
- Height: 70 m (230 ft)
- Length: 260 m (850 ft)
- Dam volume: 1400000 m^{3}
- Spillway length: 182 m
- S pillway volumetric flow rate: 360 m^{3}/s

Reservoir
- Total capacity: 24000000 m^{3}
- Catchment area: 91 km^{2}
- Surface area: 1250000 m^{2}

Evretou Dam (Greek: Φράγμα Ευρέτου) is the third largest dam in Cyprus and also the largest rock-fill dam on the island. It lies at an altitude of 165 m and is located about 15 km south of Polis Chrysochou, next to the abandoned village of Evretou. It is part of the Chrysochou Irrigation Project, the construction of which cost a total of CYP £21,000,000.

== See also ==
- List of reservoirs and dams in Cyprus
