= Lysos =

Lysos Λυσός
- Village
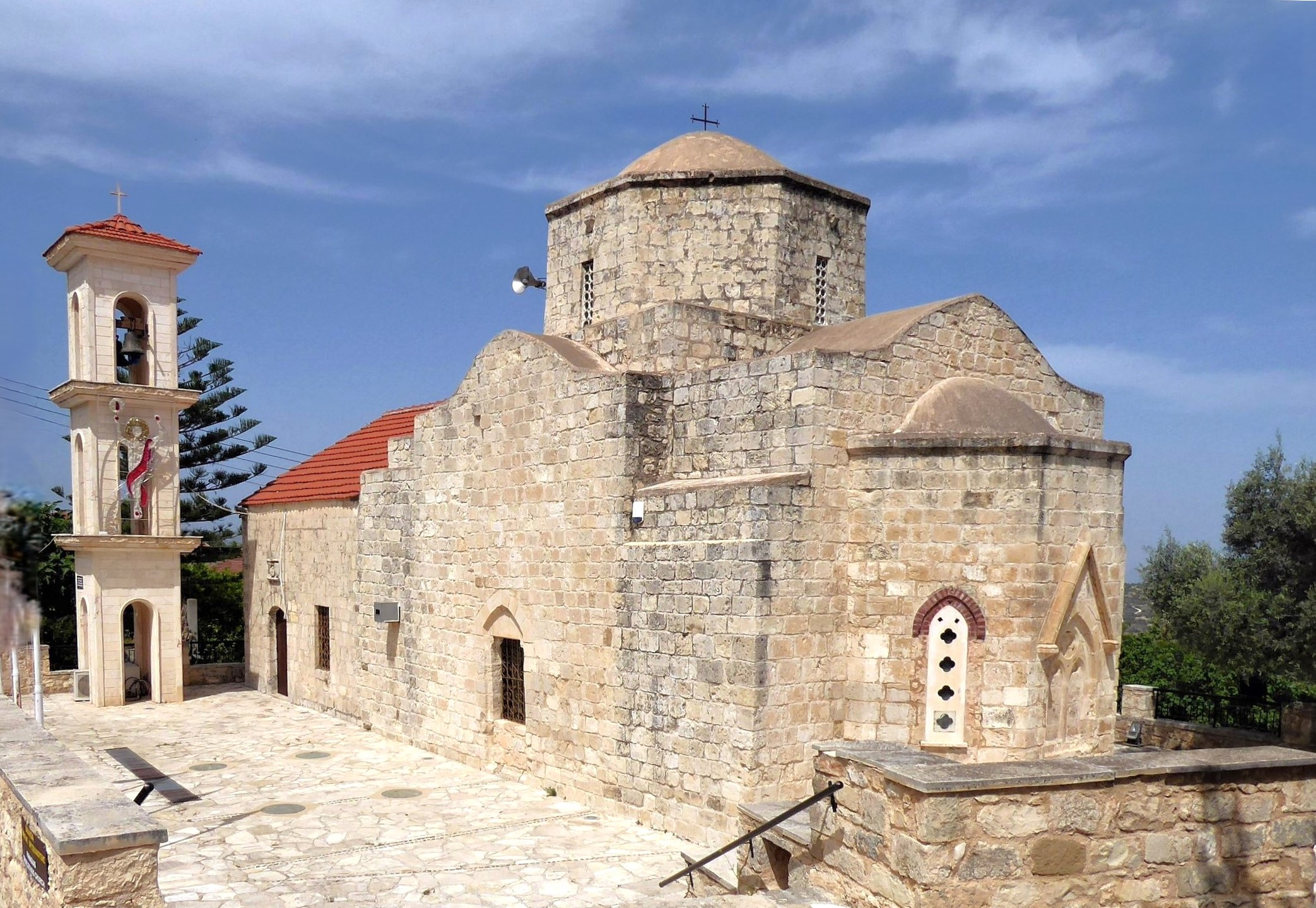
- Panagia Chryseleousa church

- Location in Cyprus
- Coordinates: 34°59′44″N 32°30′42″E
- Country: Cyprus
- District: Paphos District
- Elevation: 543 m (1,781 ft)

Population (2001)
  - Total: 160
- Time zone: UTC+2 (EET)
  - Summer (DST): UTC+3 (EEST)
- Postal code: 6320
- Website: http://www.lyssos.org.cy/

Lysos (Greek: Λυσός) is a village in Cyprus, about 36 kilometres from Paphos. The population was 160 in 2001. Being the largest in area of the villages of Cyprus, Lysos covers an area of approximately 10,000 acres in the province of Paphos. Built at an average altitude of 560 meters, the peak of Tripylos, located near Stavros tis Psokas, is considered to be the highest point of the settlement (1,362 meters), which borders eastwards with Nicosia. Most of the village's area is covered by the Paphos forest, an important biotope of wild and endemic birds, while the wider area is crossed by many nature trails. Lysos is located in the outskirts of Paphos. The name itself originates from the Greek word "liono" as it was an industrial area for the melting of metals. The archaeological findings here indicate settlements of Greeks from Asia Minor. Lysos receives approximately 615 mm of rainfall annually. The average yearly temperature is around 16.9 °C (62.4 °F).
