= Diarizos River =

River in Cyprus

Coordinates: 34°41′41″N 32°33′41″E

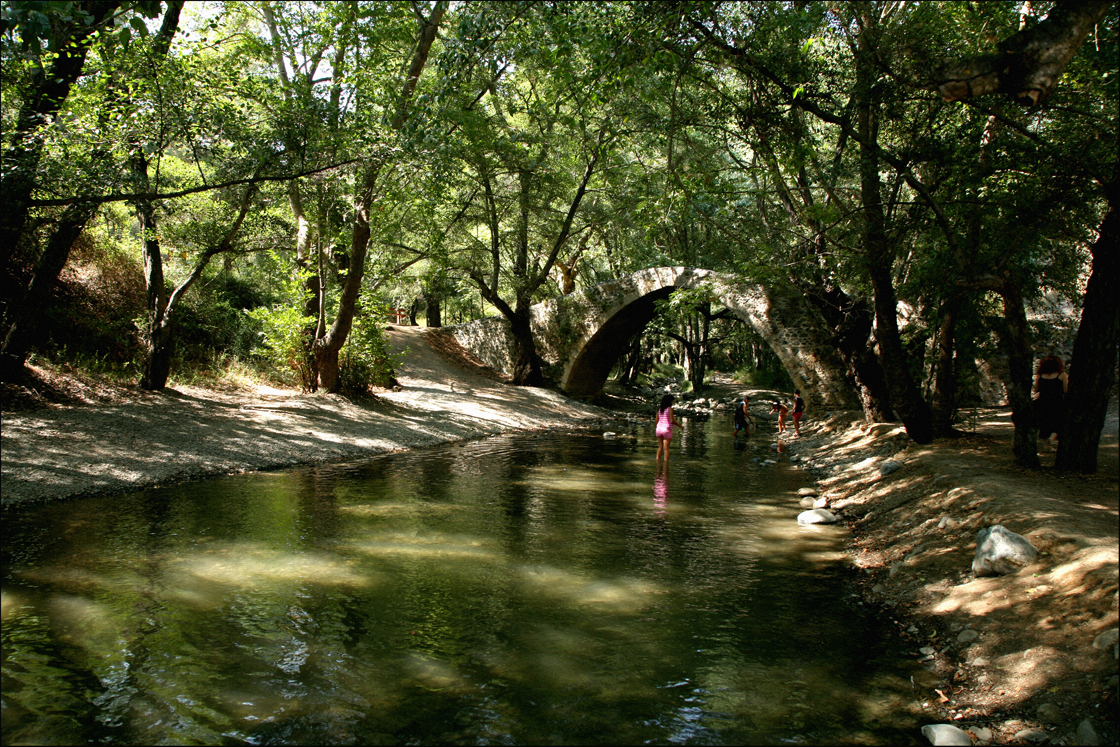
Tzelefos Bridge over the Diarizos River, Paphos District, Cyprus

The Diarizos River is a river in Cyprus, in the Limassol and Paphos Districts in the southwest of the island. The river's main stem originates from tributaries in the Troodos massif. From the Troodos it runs southward to the Arminou Dam. The upper river is predominantly perennial, while it is intermittent downstream of the Arminou Dam. (Note: In Cyprus, rivers do not maintain a constant flow along their full length. Most rivers flow for three to four months per year and remain dry for the remaining months. Only the upstream sections of six rivers originating in the Troodos Mountains—the Xeros, Diarizos, Kargotis, Marathasas, Kouris, and Germasogeia—maintain a constant flow.) When flowing through its lower bed, the river empties into the Mediterranean near Kouklia.

The Greek name “Diarizos” means "two roots" and is thought to derive from the river’s two main tributary branches: the Platy and Kaminaria mountain streams.

== Diarizos Diversion System ==
The Diarizos River forms the extreme western terminus of the Southern Conveyor Project (SCP), a water transfer network that spans southern Cyprus to redistribute the island's scarce renewable fresh water to high-demand areas. A major piece of the SCP infrastructure is the 14.5 km-long (9.0 mi) Diarizos Diversion System, an underground pipeline that diverts water from the Diarizos at the Arminou reservoir to Lake Alassa, a reservoir formed by the Kouris Dam. The Diarizos Diversion System was completed in 1999.

Arminou Dam and reservoir, Arminou, Cyprus

== Crossings ==
Near the town of Agios Nikolaos, the Diarizos is crossed by the Tzelefos Bridge (also called Barbaros), the largest medieval bridge in Cyprus. The bridge was built to connect the western villages of Milikouri, Vretsia, and Ayios Ioannisto to the eastern settlements of Agios Nikolaos, Kaminaria, and Tris Elies, and was a location for eel fishing during heavy seasonal floods. Downriver from the Tzelefos Bridge, the Diarizos passes through the village of Arminou, where it is dammed to create a reservoir.

== See also ==
- Geography of Cyprus
- Paphos Forest
