= Dragon Creek (Turkey) =

Creek in Mersin Province, Turkey

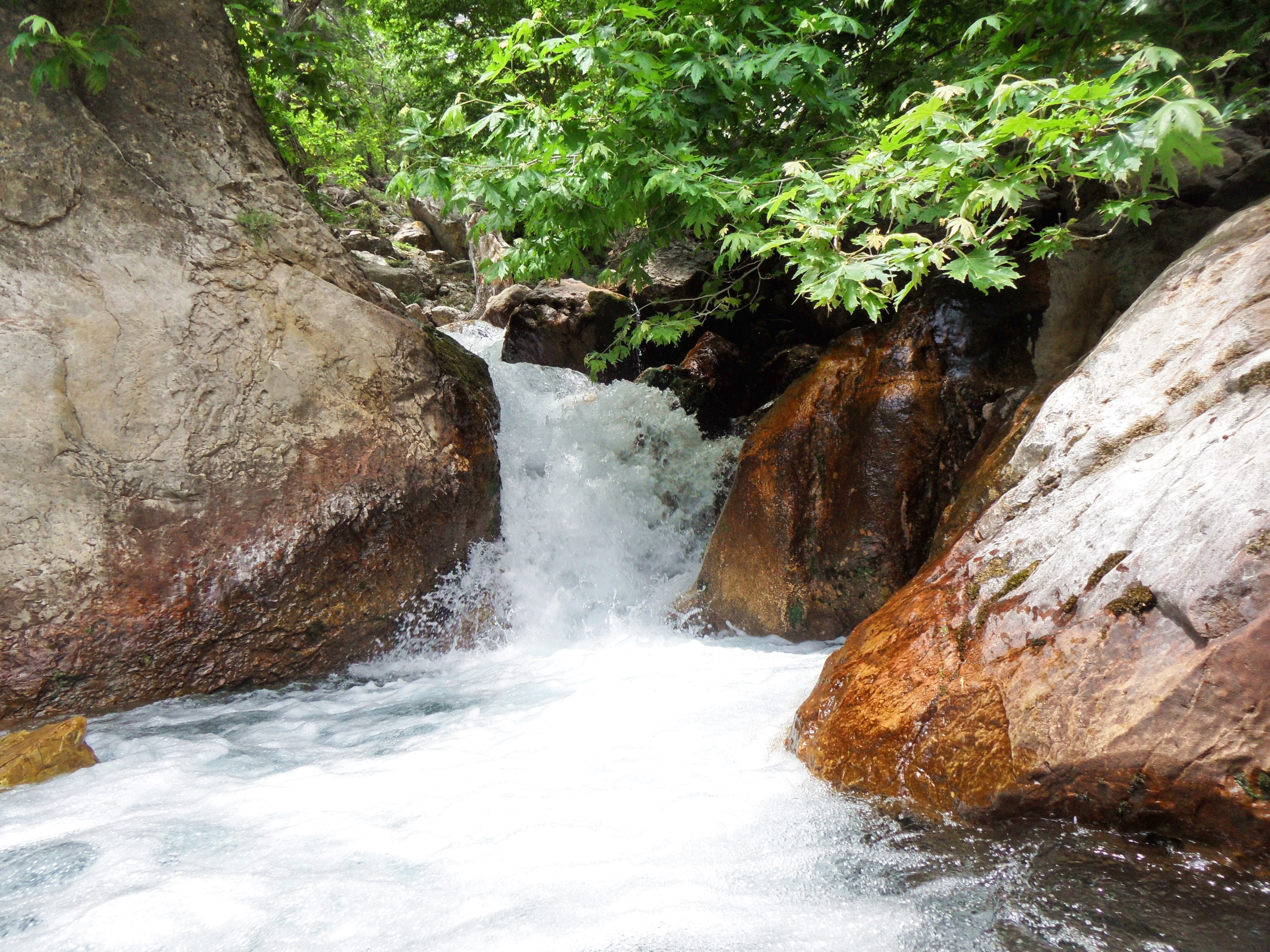
Upper reaches near Sugözü

Dragon Creek, also called Kocaçay or Anamur Creek, is a creek in Anamur district of Mersin Province, southern Turkey.

== Geography ==
The short creek is in Anamur district of Mersin Province. Its main source is an underground river, which rises to the surface around Sugözü village about 35 km (22 mi) to the Mediterranean Sea coast. The creek has three tributaries and flows into the Mediterranean Sea at 36°04′27″N 32°52′48″E. This point is almost in the urban fabric of Anamur and about 3 km (1.9 mi) to the west of Mamure Castle. Its distance to Mersin is 220 km (140 mi). A 10 km (6.2 mi) part of the stream to the north of the historical bridge Alaköprü is a popular rafting course.

== Hydrology ==
The monthly average flow rate of Dragon Creek, which has a non-uniform flow pattern, is 24.43 m^{3}/s (863 cu ft/s). The highest flow rates are in the spring, and fall to a minimum during the late summer months.

== Cyprus water supply network ==
Dragon Creek is the source of the 65 km (40 mi)-long undersea pipeline to Cyprus as to support the Cyprus water supply network. The reservoir is Alaköprü Dam. Because of this project Akine, Ormancık and Sarıağaç villages, which were around the creek were relocated by the government.
