= Arminou =

Arminou Αρμίνου
- Village
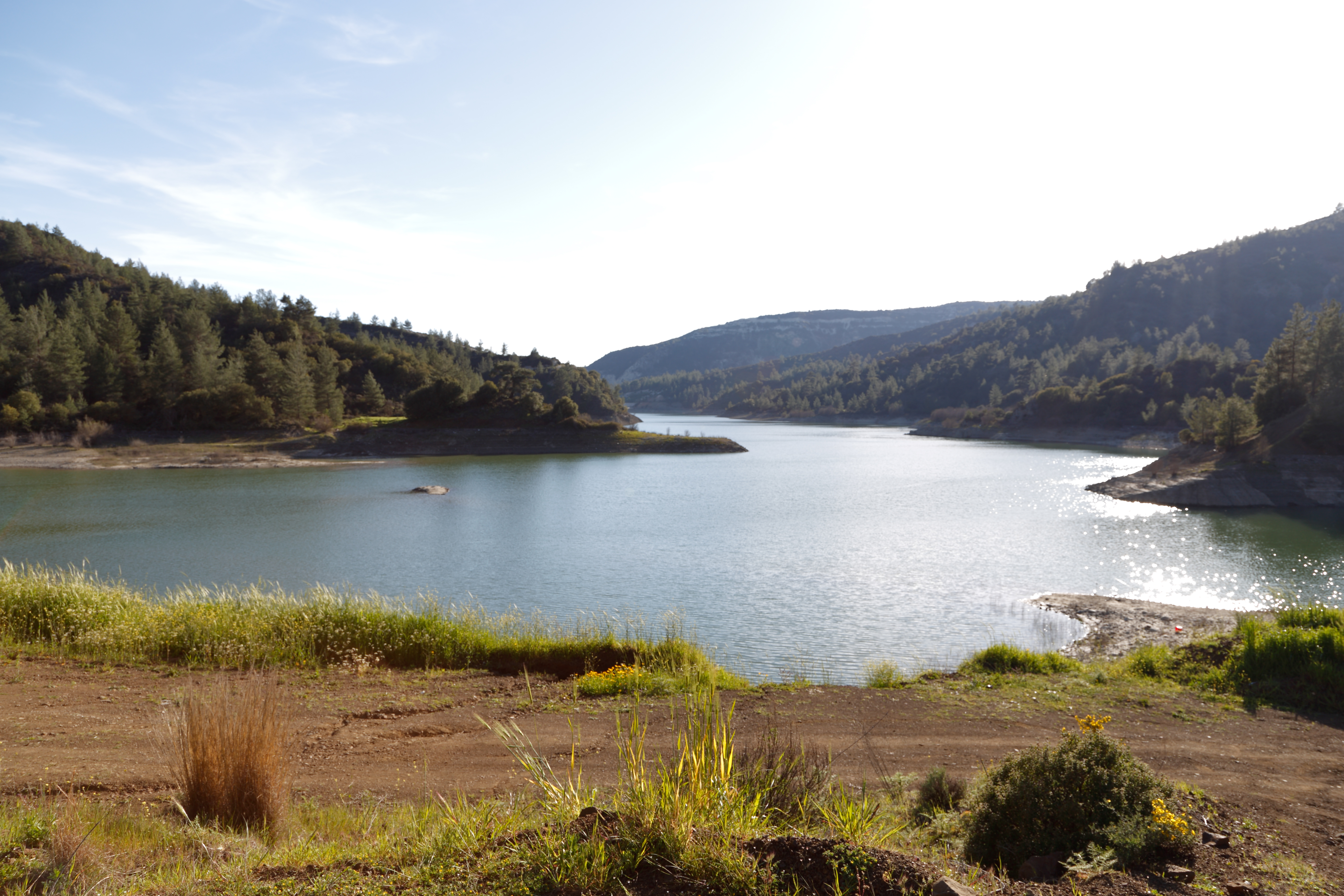
- Arminou Reservoir

- Location in Cyprus
- Coordinates: 34°51′42″N 32°43′10″E
- Country: Cyprus
- District: Paphos District

Population (2001)
  - Total: 26
- Time zone: UTC+2 (EET)
  - Summer (DST): UTC+3 (EEST)
- Postal code: 8625

Arminou (Greek: Αρμίνου) is a village in the Paphos District of Cyprus on the Diarizos River. The Arminou Dam, an earthfill structure on the Diarizos near the village, was inaugurated in December 1998. A 110km water carrier tunnel, part of the Southern Conveyor Project, diverts water from the Diarizos at the dam to Lake Alassa, a reservoir formed by the Kouris Dam. The dam's capacity is 4.3 million cubic metres, with a height of 40m and a length of 194m.

Arminou has an abandoned copper mine. In 2011, the Canadian corporation Northern Lion announced that its geophysical survey in the region had located gold assays of up to 49.5g per ton.

The village is located 5 km north of Salamiou on the F617 road from Filousa to Mandria.

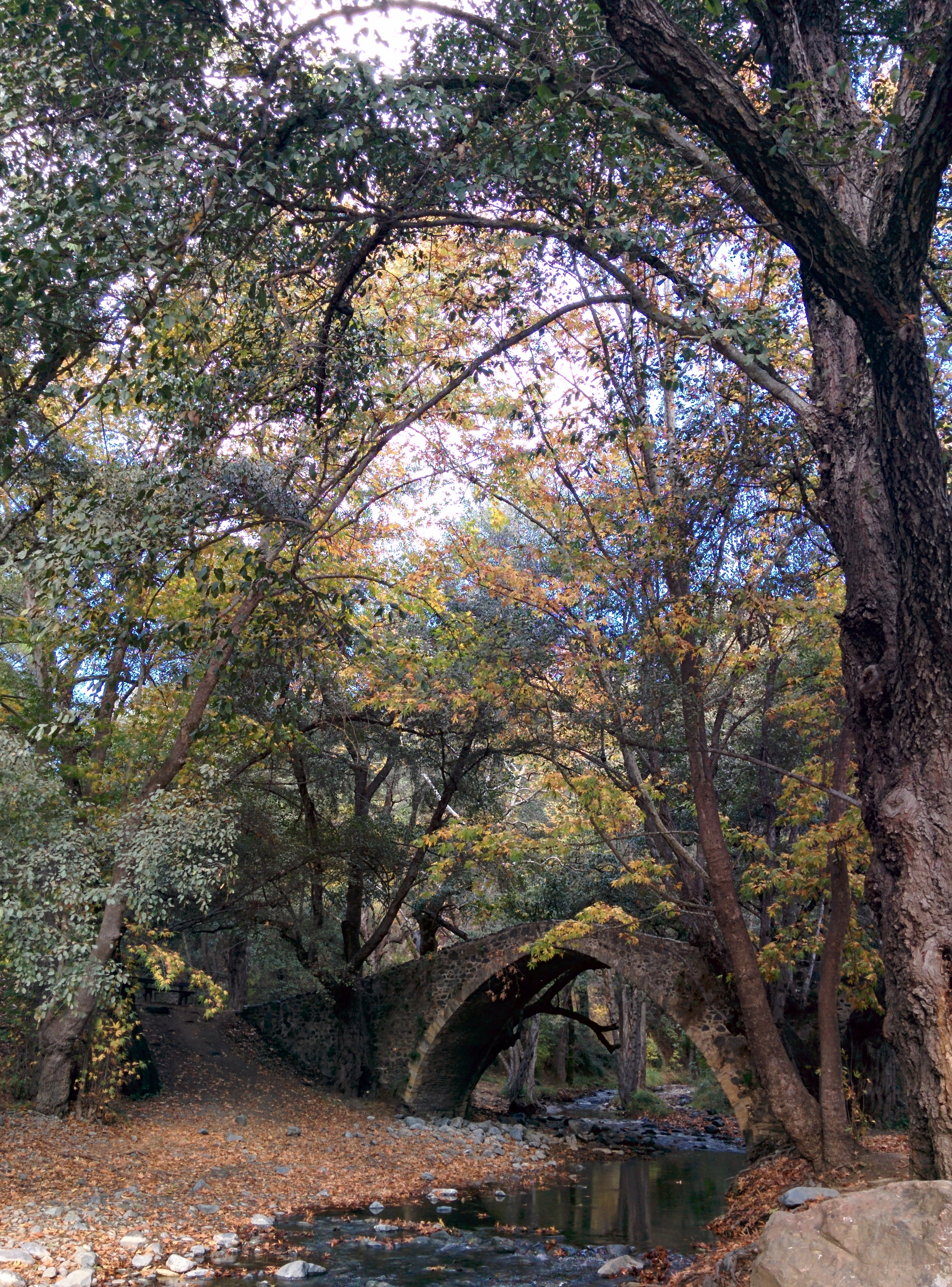
Stone bridge near Arminou, Paphos District, Cyprus

== Name ==
Two stories are told regarding the naming of the village: The first version links the naming of the village to the name of the first resident. In particular, the first resident of the village was called Arminos and therefore the village was named Arminou. According to the second version (which is the most likely one), the name derives from "Hermione", the name of an ancient Greek city in South Greece.

There is a third version which says that the village was founded by Armenians, but no Armenian names or any other sign of Armenian civilization was found in the area so it is very unlikely.

The main church of Arminou is dedicated to Agia Marina. Also located in Arminou is the now almost totally destroyed Holy Monastery of Timios Stavros which dates back to the middle of the 18th century. Nowadays only a small church and the wall surrounding the yard are preserved.

=== Population ===
The population of Arminou has rapidly declined in the last 70 years:

| Year | Population |
|---|---|
| 1881 | 207 |
| 1911 | 306 |
| 1931 | 397 |
| 1946 | 569 |
| 1973 | 176 |
| 1982 | 106 |
| 2001 | 26 |
