= Ala Bridge =

- Coordinates: 36.1751°N 32.8948°E
- Crosses: Dragon Creek

Characteristics
- Material: Stone arches
- Total length: 54 m (177 ft)
- Longest span: 19.65 metres (64 ft)
- No. of spans: 2

History
- Construction start: 14th century

Location
- Interactive map of Ala Bridge

Ala Bridge (Turkish: Ala Köprü) is a historic bridge in Turkey. It is still in use.

== Geography ==
The bridge is in Anamur ilçe (district) of Mersin Province. It is on the road connecting Anamur to Ermenek at 36°10′31″N 32°53′41″E and on Dragon Creek. Its distance to Anamur is 17 kilometres (11 mi). Alaköprü Dam is to the north of the bridge.

== History ==
The bridge was constructed by the Karamanids. Karamanids were a Turkmen beylik which were the main rivals of the Ottomans in Anatolia up to the end of the 15th century. (see Anatolian Beyliks) In the 14th century they dominated most of the Mediterranean coast. They constructed the bridge to control Anamur in the coast from Ermenek a city in the mountains. But there is no inscription on the bridge and exact construction date is unknown.

== Architecture ==
The bridge is an arch type bridge. Main arch is a 19.65 metres (64.5 ft) arch. There is also a minor arch next to the main arch which acts as a discharging cell during heavy rain fall. The total length of the bridge is 54 metres (177 ft) and the height of the parapet is 0.75 metres (2 ft 6 in)
