= List of dams and reservoirs in Cyprus =

Cyprus has a total of 109 dams and reservoirs, with a total water storage capacity of about 330,000,000 m^{3}. Reservoirs remain the principal source of water both for domestic and agricultural use. Water desalination plants are gradually being constructed in order to deal with recent years of prolonged drought.

	Name	District	Type	Completed	Capacity (m^{3})	Coordinates
1	Kouris	Limassol	Earthen	1988	115,000,000	34.7278°N 32.9178°E
2	Asprokremmos	Paphos	Earthen	1982	52,375,000	34.7259°N 32.5543°E
3	Evretou	Paphos	Rockfill	1986	24,000,000	34.9757°N 32.4727°E
4	Geçitköy	Kyrenia	Rockfill	2014	35,000,000	35.3292°N 33.0709°E
5	Kannaviou	Paphos	Earth/rockfill	2005	18,000,000	34.9277°N 32.5878°E
6	Kalavasos	Larnaca	Rockfill	1985	17,100,000	34.803972°N 33.260517°E
7	Lefkara	Larnaca	Earth/rockfill	1973	13,850,000	34.8944°N 33.2956°E
8	Dipotamos (Note: The storage capacity was increased from the original 13,700,000m^{3} in July 1998.)	Larnaca	Rockfill	1985	15,500,000	34.851618°N 33.359274°E
9	Germasoyeia	Limassol	Earthfill	1968	13,500,000	34.7439°N 33.0843°E
10	Achna	Famagusta	Earthfill	1987	6,800,000	35.055321°N 33.814307°E
11	Kouklia	Famagusta	Earthfill	1900	4,545,000	35.1207°N 33.7606°E
12	Arminou	Paphos	Earth/rockfill	1998	4,300,000	34.8752°N 32.7371°E
13	Polemidia	Limassol	Earthfill	1965	3,400,000	34.7187°N 32.9888°E
14	Tamasos	Nicosia	Earth/rockfill	2002	2,800,000	35.0167°N 33.2479°E
15	Mavrokolympos	Paphos	Earthfill	1966	2,180,000	34.8565°N 32.4058°E
16	Argaka	Paphos	n/a	n/a	990,000	35.0486°N 32.5022°E
17	Pomos	Paphos	n/a	n/a	860,000	35.1449°N 32.5762°E
18	Agia Marina	Paphos	n/a	n/a	298,000	35.1170°N 32.5410°E
19	Vyzakia	Nicosia	n/a	n/a	1,690,000	35.0615°N 33.0272°E
20	Xyliatos	Nicosia	n/a	n/a	1,430,000	35.0089°N 33.0372°E
21	Kalopanagiotis	Nicosia	n/a	n/a	363,000	35.0061°N 32.8254°E
22	Pera Pedi	Limassol	Gravity	n/a	55,000	34°52'17.35"N 32°51'55.60"E
23	Prodromos	Nicosia	*Reservoir	n/a	122,000	34°56'54.88"N 32°50'41.02"E
24	Saittas/Trimiklini	Limassol	Gravity	n/a	340,000	34°51'49.04"N 32°54'51.68"E
25	Pomos	Paphos	Gravity	n/a	859,000	35° 8'31.49"N 32°34'35.55"E
26	Ayia Marina	Paphos	Gravity	n/a	<750,000	35°7'15" N 32°32'30" E
27	Achera	Nicosia	Earthfill	n/a	n/a	35° 4'5.65"N 33° 7'48.91"E
28	Klirou/Malounta	Nicosia	Earthfill	n/a	82,000	35° 1'54.36"N 33°10'21.72"E
29	Tremithos-Kiti	Larnaca	Earthfill	n/a	360,000	34°52'19.66"N 33°33'36.74"E
30	Lympia	Nicosia	Gravirt	n/a	220,000	34°58'30.64"N 33°25'8.66"E
31	Anatoliko	Paphos	Earthfill	n/a	c.a300,000	34°45'17.32"N 32°29'24.23"E
32	Moni	Nicosia	*Reservoir	n/a	c.a125,000	35° 3'8.51"N 33° 5'26.60"E
33	Evrychou	Nicosia	Gravity	n/a	c.a150,000	35° 3'56.14"N 32°54'9.54"E
34	Delikipos	Larnaca	Gabion	2008	60,000	34°54'38.7"N 33°21'25.1"E
35	Lythrodontas	Nicosia	Earthfill	n/a	32,000	34°56'36.33"N 33°16'29.27"E
36	Athalassa	Nicosia	Earthfill	1962	791,000	35°07'45.2"N 33°23'19.9"E

== See also ==
Southern Conveyor Project
