= Southern Conveyor Project =

Water management infrastructure in Cyprus

The Southern Conveyor Project (SCP) is a water transfer system in Cyprus. It is a network of dams and pipelines which collects and stores winter runoff in large reservoirs and moves the water by gravity and pumping stations to meet demand throughout the year. The main conveyor is 110 km long, with a western terminus at the Kouris Dam in Limassol District and a eastern terminus at the Achna Dam in Famagusta District. The system redistributes the island's scarce renewable freshwater by transferring it to urban centers and to agricultural areas dependent on irrigation.

There are six dams in the main conveyor network; the Kouris, Kalavasos, Dipotamos, Lefkara, Germasogeia, and the Achna. The Lefkara Dam is a hub that can receives water transported from other dams. The Asprokremmos and Kannaviou dams which serve Paphos comprise a separate system which works on the same principle as the SCP.

The SCP system was constructed in two phases. Phase I began in 1984 and was completed in 1994. Phase II was completed in 1999. A major component of Phase II is the 14.5 km-long (9.0 mi) Diarizos Diversion System, an underground pipeline that diverts water from the Diarizos River at the Arminou reservoir to Lake Alassa, the reservoir formed by the Kouris Dam.

The SCP is the largest water development project ever executed by the Cypriot government.

== Purpose ==
The Southern Conveyor Project was designed to secure a reliable water supply for major Cypriot urban centers and agricultural regions.

Cyprus faces water insecurity. It has an arid Mediterranean climate, and no lakes or permanently flowing rivers. Annual rainfall averages 50 centimeters—80 percent of which is lost to evapotranspiration—and falls mainly over the Troodos Mountains in the west, in winter; while demand peaks in summer, and is especially high in the eastern part of the island. Prior to Cypriot independence in 1960, sixteen small dams and reservoirs provided localized water supplies, but these failed to meet the demands of the island's population growth and the expansion of its tourism sector.

The agricultural sector, largely reliant on irrigation, dominates water consumption in Cyprus. Coastal saltwater intrusion into inland porous aquifers has increased soil salinity, which means more freshwater irrigation is needed to prevent crop failure. Municipal, industrial, and seasonal tourism sectors account for the remaining usage.

The Southern Conveyor remains decisive for agriculture and for managing reserves, even as desalination plants now meet much of Cyprus’s urban demand and the Southern Conveyor is no longer the island’s sole source of drinking water.

== See also ==
- Geography of Cyprus
- List of dams and reservoirs in Cyprus
- Turkey–Northern Cyprus water pipeline
