= Turkey–Northern Cyprus water pipeline =

International water supply pipeline

Turkey-Northern Cyprus pipeline

General information
- Type: water

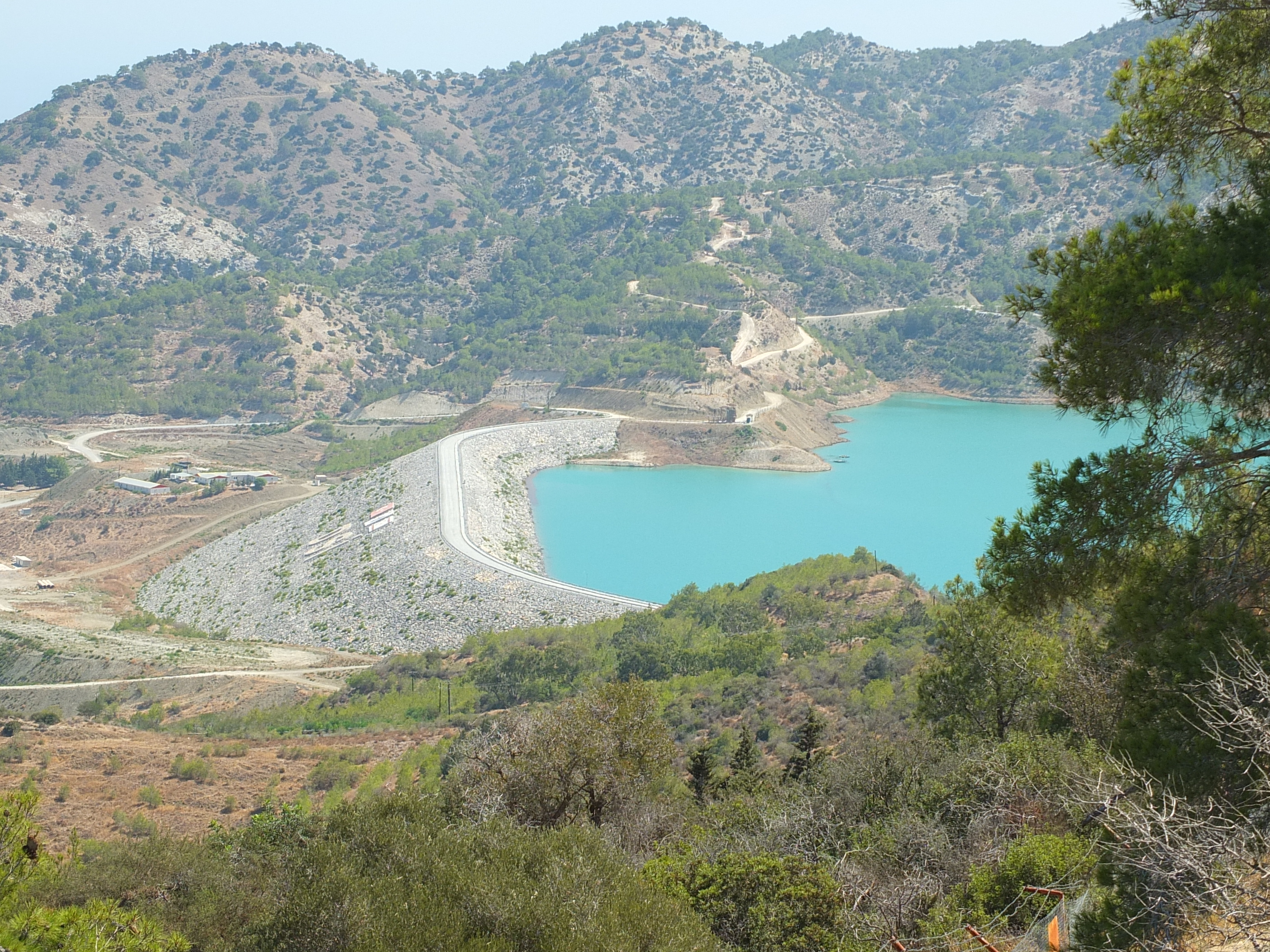
Geçitköy Dam and reservoir.

The Turkey–Northern Cyprus water pipeline supplies water for drinking and irrigation from southern Turkey to Northern Cyprus (Turkish Republic of Northern Cyprus, TRNC) via a pipeline under the Mediterranean Sea. It was built by the TRNC Water Supply Project (Turkish: KKTC Su Temin Projesi) and completed in September 2014. It is the only long-distance underwater water pipeline in the world.

== Background ==
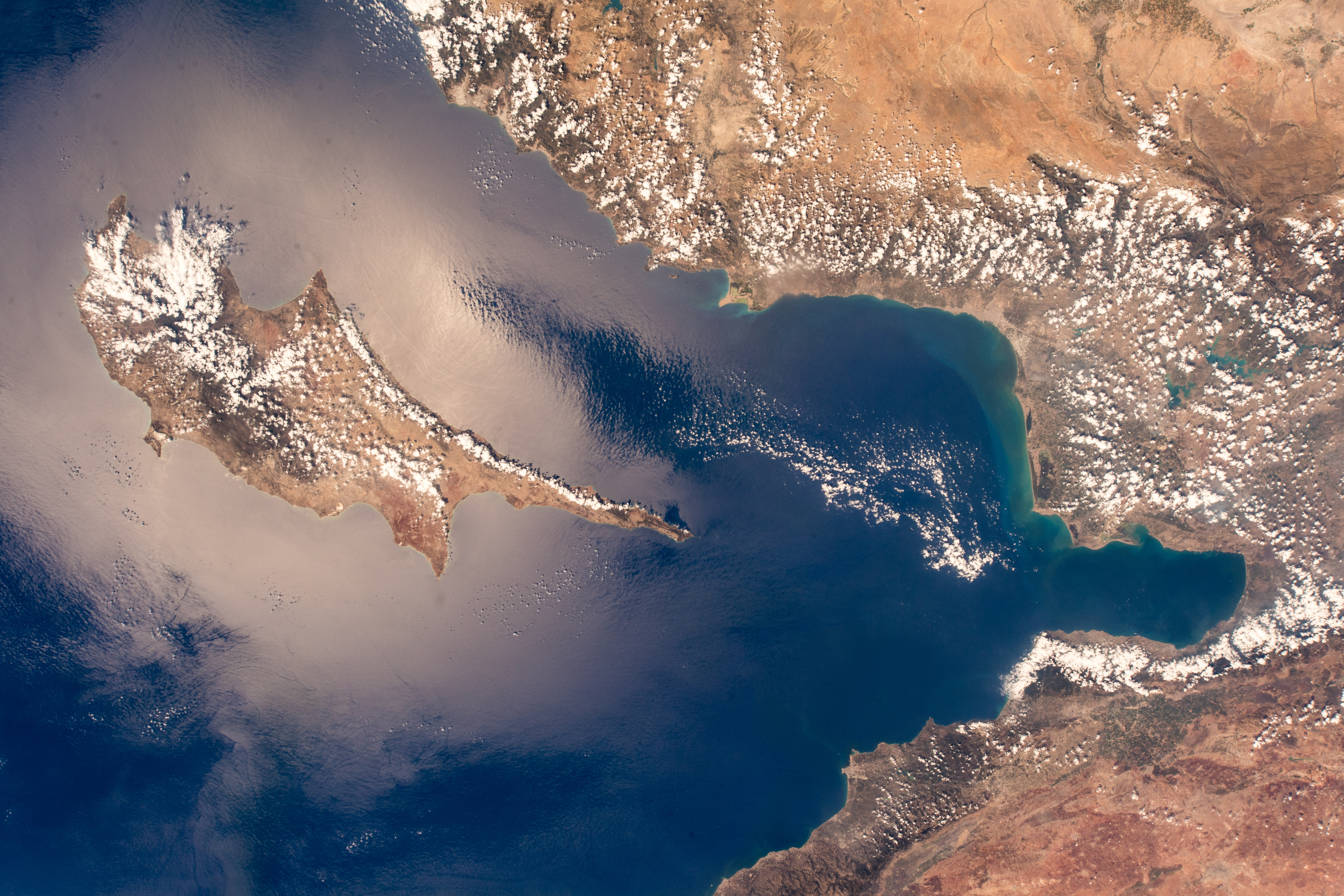
The island of Cyprus off the southern coast of Turkey.

Cyprus, an island in the Eastern Mediterranean Sea located off the southern coast of Turkey, has historically experienced prolonged drought periods that have impacted both the agricultural and distributive sectors greatly. Over a 70 year period prior to the start of the 2000s, the average annual rainfall in the region had fallen about 64 mm, illustrating increasing evidence of the adverse effects of global climate and temperature change in Cyprus. Cyprus has been observing more issues regarding the water supply in the last two decades, especially with lowered water tables recorded in over 60 aquifers and the strain on groundwater availability that the undertaking of civil projects in the region has caused. As the project concluded, the President of the Turkish Cypriot Chamber of Commerce expressed his gratitude and hope for the project, citing its potential to diminish water scarcity and improve conditions on the island in general. The Northern Cyprus Water Supply Project achieved numerous feats in compliance with the United Nations Sustainable Development Goals, specifically goal 2 of "zero hunger," such as decreasing food insecurity.

The Northern Cyprus Water Supply Project also raised questions regarding opportunities for women to become involved and counteract existing social norms/hierarchies in the Middle East. Water management along with other natural resources proves to require collaboration amongst genders, yet this did not seem to be a prominent aspect in Cyprus. A comprehensive review of interviews of women in the region of interest illustrates that women were not included in water policy provisions, and no women were standing members of the Water Commission created by the organization that oversees Cypriot engineering and architecture.

== Project ==
Cyprus is short of surface water and groundwater due to inadequate rainfall. The project aims to supply Northern Cyprus with water from Turkey for a timespan of 50 years. Of the 75 million m^{3} water, 37.76 million m^{3} (50.3%) will be used for drinking purposes and the remaining part (49.7%) will be allocated for irrigation. Following the realization of the project, irrigated farming at an area of 4,824 ha (11,920 acres) in Mesaoria Plains, one of largest plains of the island, will help improve the standard of living in the region.

The total investment cost of the project is budgeted at ₺ 782 million (approx. US$432 million) consisting of ₺ 45.6 million (approx. US$25.2 million) for structures in Turkey, ₺ 630 million (approx. US$348 million) for the undersea pipeline and ₺ 26.9 million (approx. US$14.9 million) for the structures in Northern Cyprus.

Stage 1

Alaköprü Dam is in Anamur, Mersin Province on the Anamur Creek at 88 m (289 ft) elevation. Groundbreaking was done on March 7, 2011. It has a reservoir holding 130.5 million m3 (4.61 billion cu ft). The dam was completed on March 7, 2014.

Stage 2

A pipeline of 1,500 mm (59 in) diameter and 22 km (14 mi) length carries 75 million m^{3} (2.6 billion cu ft) of water per year from Alaköprü Dam to Anamur Pumping Station, which connects to under sea pipeline in 1 km (0.62 mi) distance.

Stage 3

An 80 km (50 mi) long under sea pipeline of 1,600 mm (63 in) in 250 m (820 ft) depth in Mediterranean Sea transfers water from Anamur Plant in Turkey to Güzelyalı Pumping Station in Northern Cyprus. The pipeline will have sensors and transmitters mounted to signal any possible faults for repair.

Stage 4

A pipeline of 3 km (1.9 mi) elevates water from Güzelyalı Station to the reservoir of Geçitköy Dam close to the city of Girne.

The project was carried out by the Turkish State Hydraulic Works (DSİ). It consists of the construction of a dam and a pumping station at each on both sides as well as a pipeline of 107 km (66 mi) running mainly under sea. The construction had four stages.

== Realization ==
The Northern Cyprus Water Supply Project for transporting water to Cyprus was to be completed in September 2014. The realization of the project took place on October 8, 2015 with the arrival of first waters in Northern Cyprus pumped from Turkey. The high-density polyethylene underwater pipeline with 1,600 mm (5 ft 3 in) diameter is 80.15 km (49.80 mi) long and is suspended at a depth of 250 m (820 ft). The project, including the water purification and water distribution facilities, cost ₺ 1.255 billion (approx. US$ 450 million). The pipeline transfers annually 75 million m^{3} water from the Alaköprü Dam on the Anamur Creek in Turkey to the Geçitköy Dam in Northern Cyprus.

- Alaköprü Dam: 36°10′53″N 32°53′44″E
- Geçitköy Dam: 35°19′40″N 33°04′24″E

== See also ==
- Southern Conveyor Project
