= Agios Ioannis, Paphos =

Agios Ioannis Pafou Άγιος Ιωάννης Πάφου
- Village
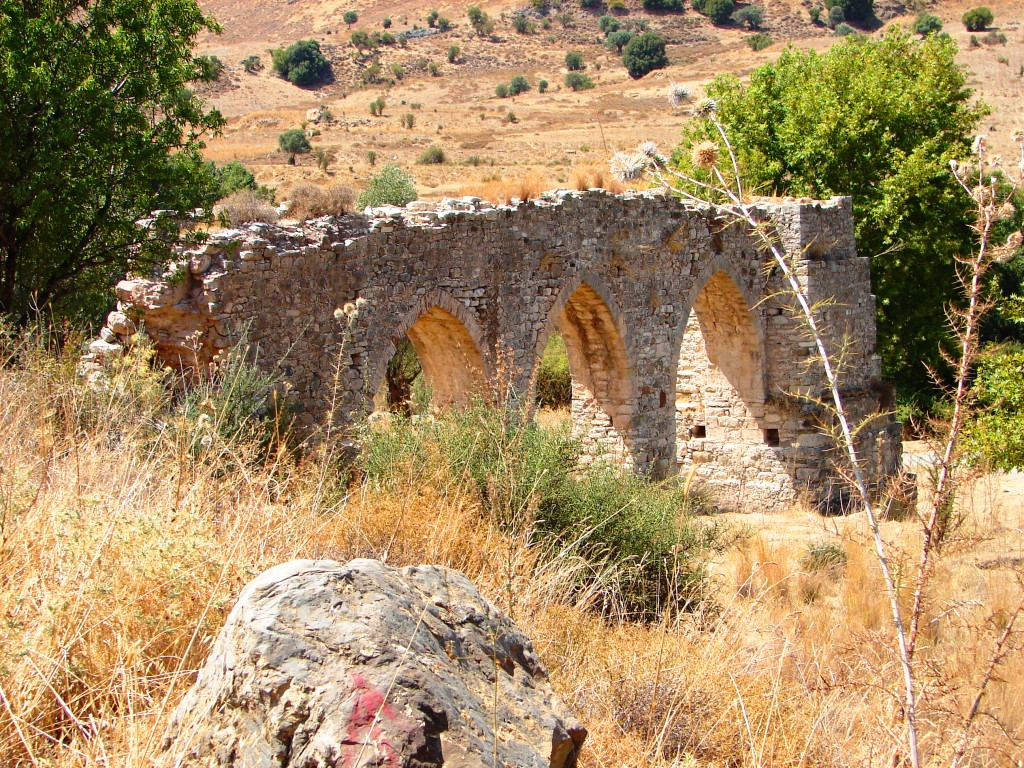

- Location in Cyprus
- Coordinates: 34°52′4″N 32°41′25″E
- Country: Cyprus
- District: Paphos District

Population (2001)
  - Total: 33
- Time zone: UTC+2 (EET)
  - Summer (DST): UTC+3 (EEST)

Agios Ioannis Pafou (Greek: Άγιος Ιωάννης Πάφου; Turkish: Aydın or Ayyanni) is a small village in the Paphos District of Cyprus, located 4 km (2.5 mi) north of Salamiou. Prior to 1974, the village was inhabited almost exclusively by Turkish Cypriots.
