= Çaltıbükü =

- Neighbourhood
- Location in Turkey
- Coordinates: 36°13′N 32°49′E
- Country: Turkey
- Province: Mersin
- District: Anamur
- Elevation: 160 m (520 ft)
- Population (2022): 110
- Time zone: UTC+3 (TRT)
- Postal code: 33630
- Area code: 0324

Çaltıbükü is a neighbourhood in the municipality and district of Anamur, Mersin Province, Turkey. Its population is 110 (2022). It is situated in the valley of Dragon creek. The distance to Anamur is 16 kilometres (9.9 mi). It is planned that a part of the village (along with Akine, Sarıağaç and Ormancık) will be submerged in Alaköprü Dam reservoir.
