= Akine, Anamur =

Akine
- Neighbourhood
- Location within Turkey
- Coordinates: 36°12′N 32°52′E
- Country: Turkey
- Province: Mersin
- District: Anamur
- Elevation: 115 m (377 ft)
- Population (2022): 356
- Time zone: UTC+3 (TRT)
- Postal code: 33630
- Area code: 0324

Akine is a neighbourhood in the municipality and district of Anamur, Mersin Province, Turkey. Its population is 356 (2022). It is situated in the Taurus Mountains along Dragon Creek. Its distance to Anamur is 22 kilometres (14 mi). It is planned that a part of the village (along with Çaltıbükü, Ormancık and Sarıağaç) will be submerged in Alaköprü Dam reservoir.

== History ==
Akine was previously a village as an administrative division, but became a neighbourhood after the law change in 2012.
