= Ormancık, Anamur =

Ormancık
- Neighbourhood
- Location in Turkey
- Coordinates: 36°12′N 32°53′E
- Country: Turkey
- Province: Mersin
- District: Anamur
- Elevation: 130 m (430 ft)
- Population (2022): 410
- Time zone: UTC+3 (TRT)
- Area code: 0324

Ormancık is a neighbourhood in the municipality and district of Anamur, Mersin Province, Turkey. Its population is 410 (2022). It is situated in the forests of Toros Mountains to the east of Dragon creek. Its distance to Anamur is 17 kilometres (11 mi). It is planned that a part of the village (along with Akine, Çaltıbükü and Sarıağaç) will be submerged in Alaköprü Dam reservoir.
