= Treis Elies =

Treis Elies Τρεις Ελιές
- Village
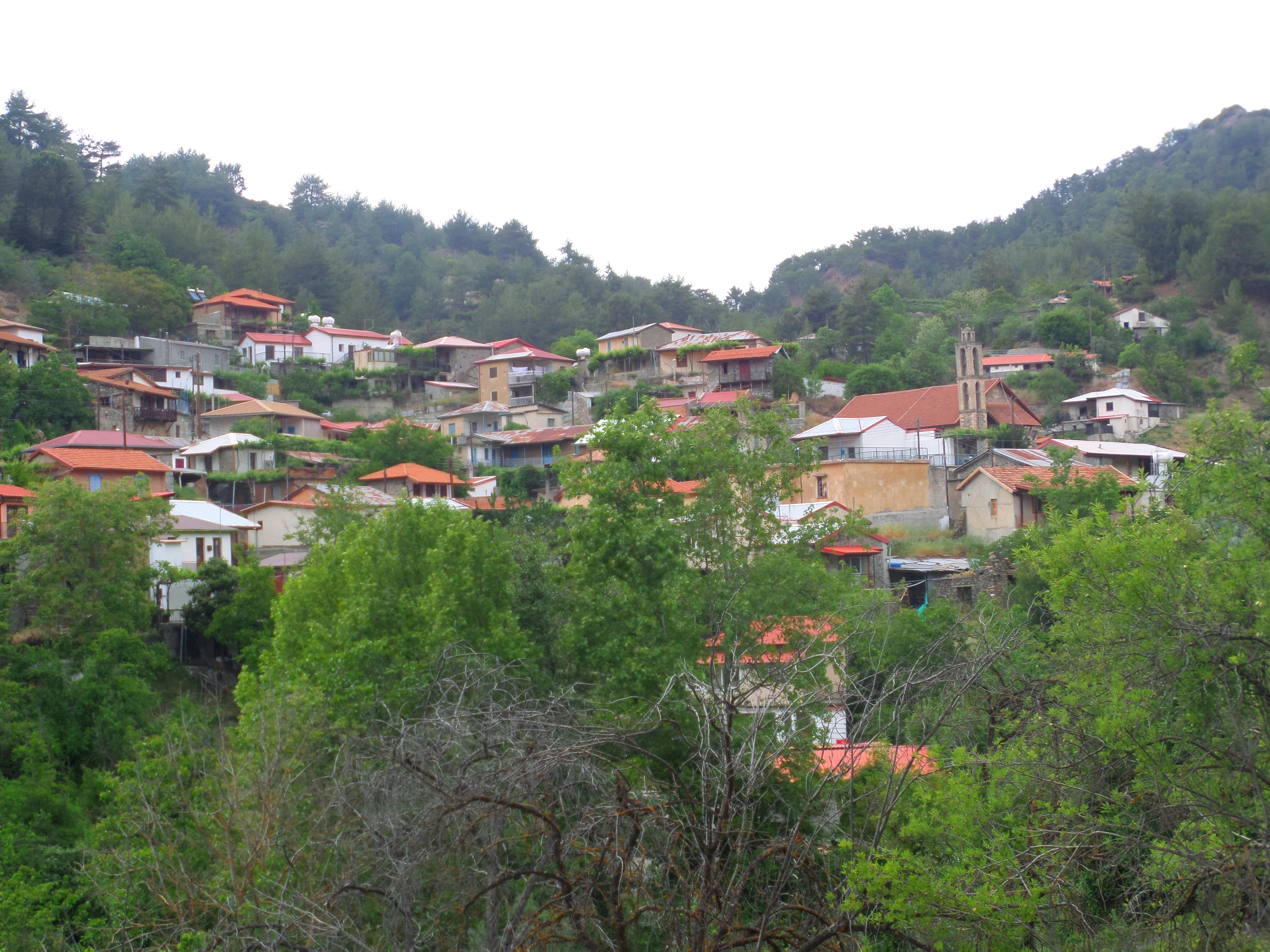

- Location in Cyprus
- Coordinates: 34°55′55″N 32°47′36″E
- Country: Cyprus
- District: Limassol District

Population (2021)
  - Total: 36
- Time zone: UTC+2 (EET)
  - Summer (DST): UTC+3 (EEST)

Treis Elies is a village in the Limassol District of Cyprus, which is also known as Triselyes, Tris Eliæs, Tris Eliaes, Üçzeytinler, Uczeytinler. Nearby cities include Agios Dimitrios to the east, Lemithou to the north, and Kaminaria to the south. The name means: Three Olive Trees.

== Name ==
According to Nearchos Kliridis, the village's name derives from the presence of three olive trees there, something rare for this mountainous region.

== History ==
During the Venetian period (1489–1571), the village was one of 24 villages in the Marathasa region that fell under the estates of the Republic of Venice. The earliest evidence of the village's ecclesiastical history, such as the lintel of the iconostasis in the Church of the Archangel, attests to the village's existence at least since the late Frankish period in the 15th century.

In the Ottoman period, Archbishop Chrysanthos (1767–1810), originated from Tries Elies. His family home is preserved to this day and is known by the name of his father, Chrysanthos, as "the House of Konomos". Also originating from Tries Elies during the Ottoman period were the bishops of Kition Meletios (1776–1797), Chrysanthos I of Kition (1797–1810), and Chrysanthos II of Paphos (1805–1821), who is regarded as a national martyr. Also originating from Tries Elies was Maroudia Pavlidis, niece of Archbishop Chrysanthos, whom the archbishop gave in marriage to the Dragoman Hatzigeorgakis Kornesios in the mid-18th century.
