= Kaminaria =

Kaminaria Kαμινάρια
- Village
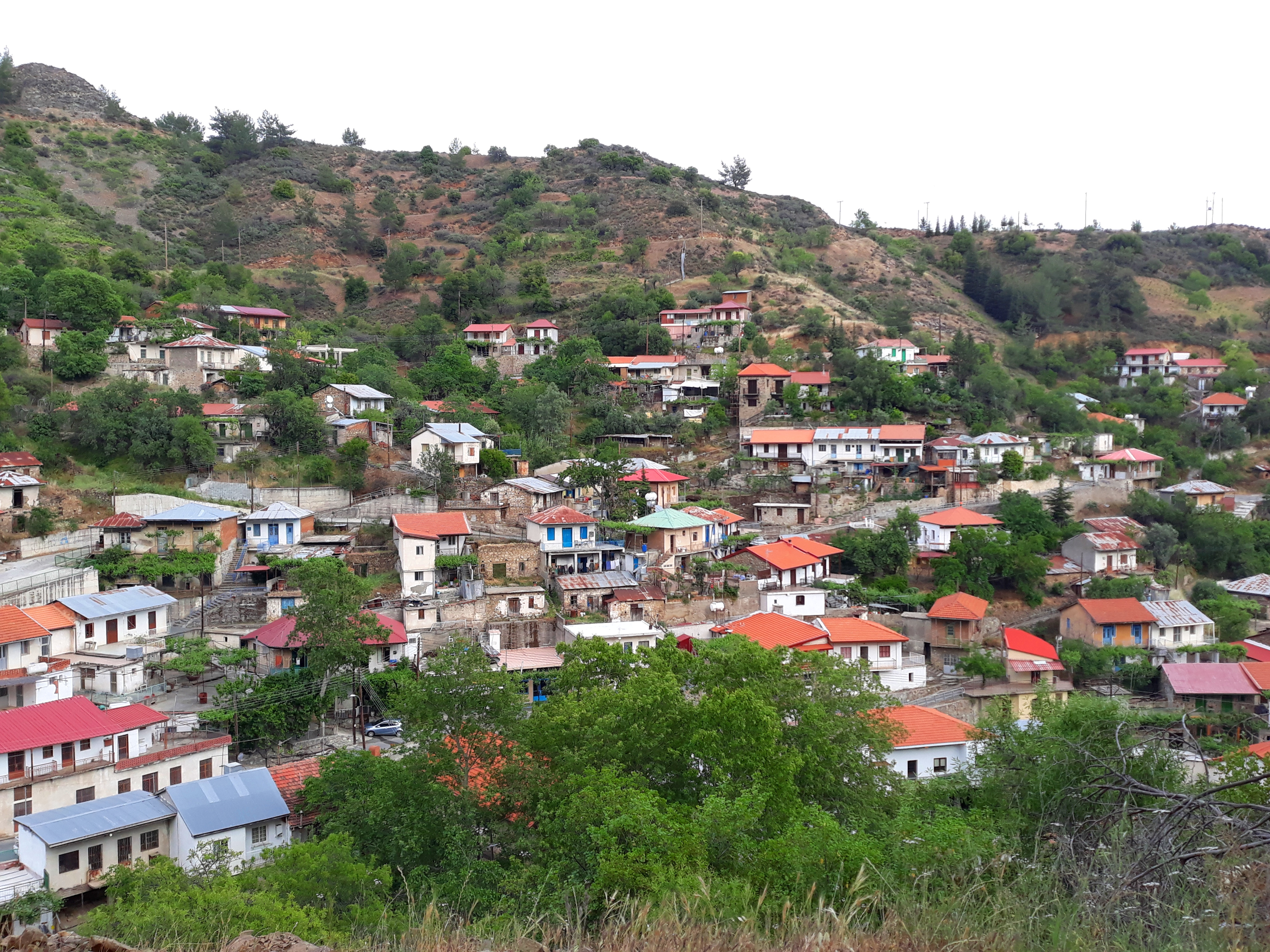

- Location in Cyprus
- Coordinates: 34°55′43″N 32°47′2″E
- Country: Cyprus
- District: Limassol District

Population (2001)
  - Total: 93
- Time zone: UTC+2 (EET)
  - Summer (DST): UTC+3 (EEST)
- Website: http://www.kaminaria.org/

Kaminaria (Greek: Kαμινάρια) is a village in the Limassol District of Cyprus, located 2 km south of Treis Elies.
