= Geçitköy Dam =

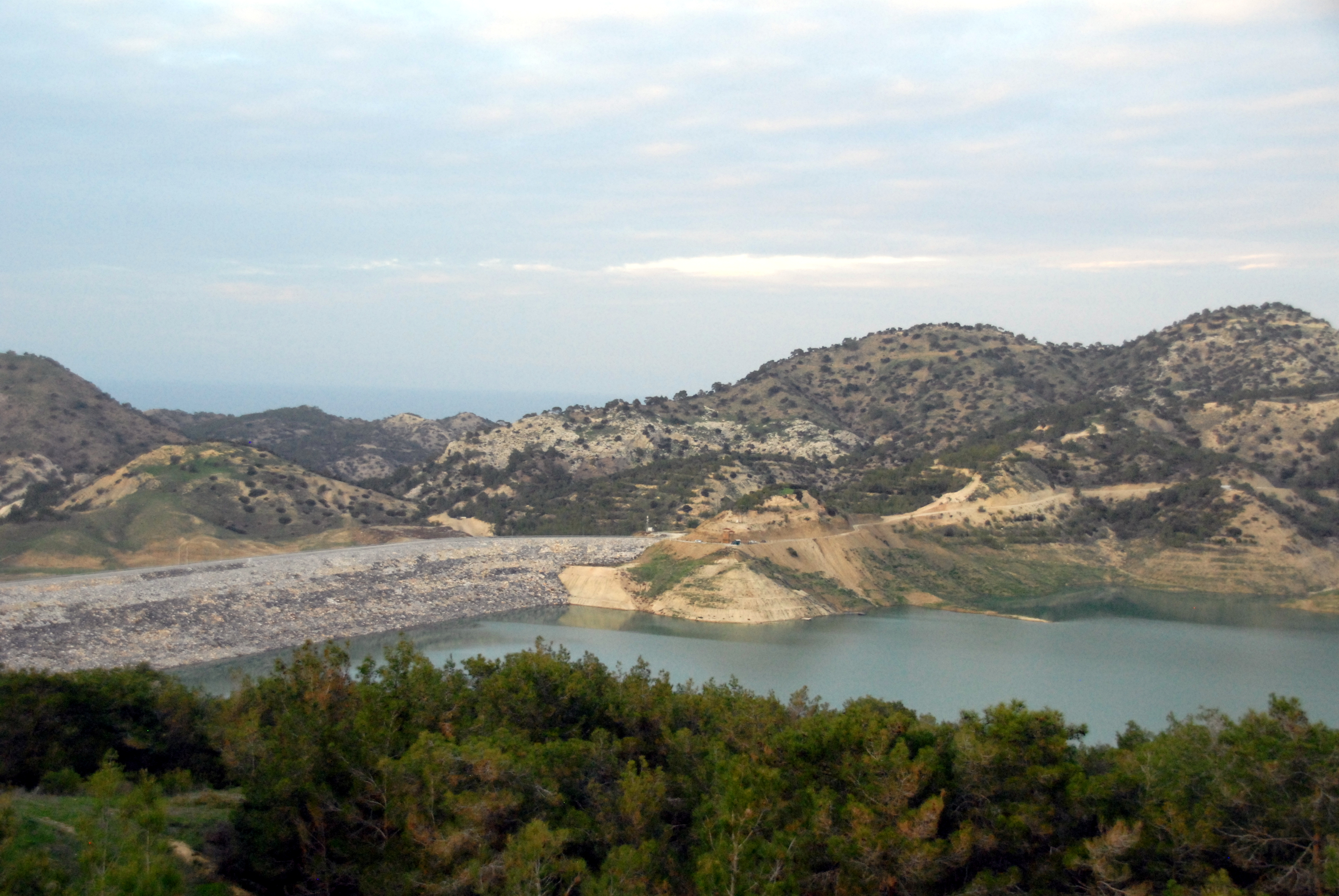
- View of the Geçitköy Dam

- Location within Cyprus
- Official name: Φράγμα της Πάναγρας
- Country: Cyprus (under control of Northern Cyprus)
- Location: Lapithos
- Coordinates: 35°19′45.33″N 33°4′15.34″E
- Purpose: Municipal and irrigation water
- Status: Operational
- Construction began: 2012
- Opening date: 2014; 12 years ago

Dam and spillways
- Type of dam: Embankment, rock-fill clay core
- Impounds: Mandara River
- Height: 65 m (213 ft)

Reservoir
- Total capacity: 35,000,000 m^{3} (28,000 acre⋅ft)

The Geçitköy Dam (Greek: Φράγμα της Πάναγρας) is a rock-fill dam on the Mandara River about 8 km (5.0 mi) west of the town of Lapithos in Cyprus. The dam is located in the de facto territory of Northern Cyprus. It was originally completed as the Dağdere Dam in 1989 but between 2012 and 2014 it was raised and expanded into its current form. The dam is part of the Northern Cyprus Water Supply Project and receives water not only from the river but via an undersea pipeline connected to the Alaköprü Dam, located near the southern shores of Mersin Province, Turkey. Construction on main works for the dam began on 30 March 2012 and it was completed on 7 March 2014. The new dam increased the reservoir capacity from 1,800,000 m^{3} (1,500 acre⋅ft) to 35,000,000 m^{3} (28,000 acre⋅ft). Water from Turkey first entered the reservoir on 17 October 2015. From there it is transferred via pumps to Girne which lies to the east.
