= Kouris Dam =

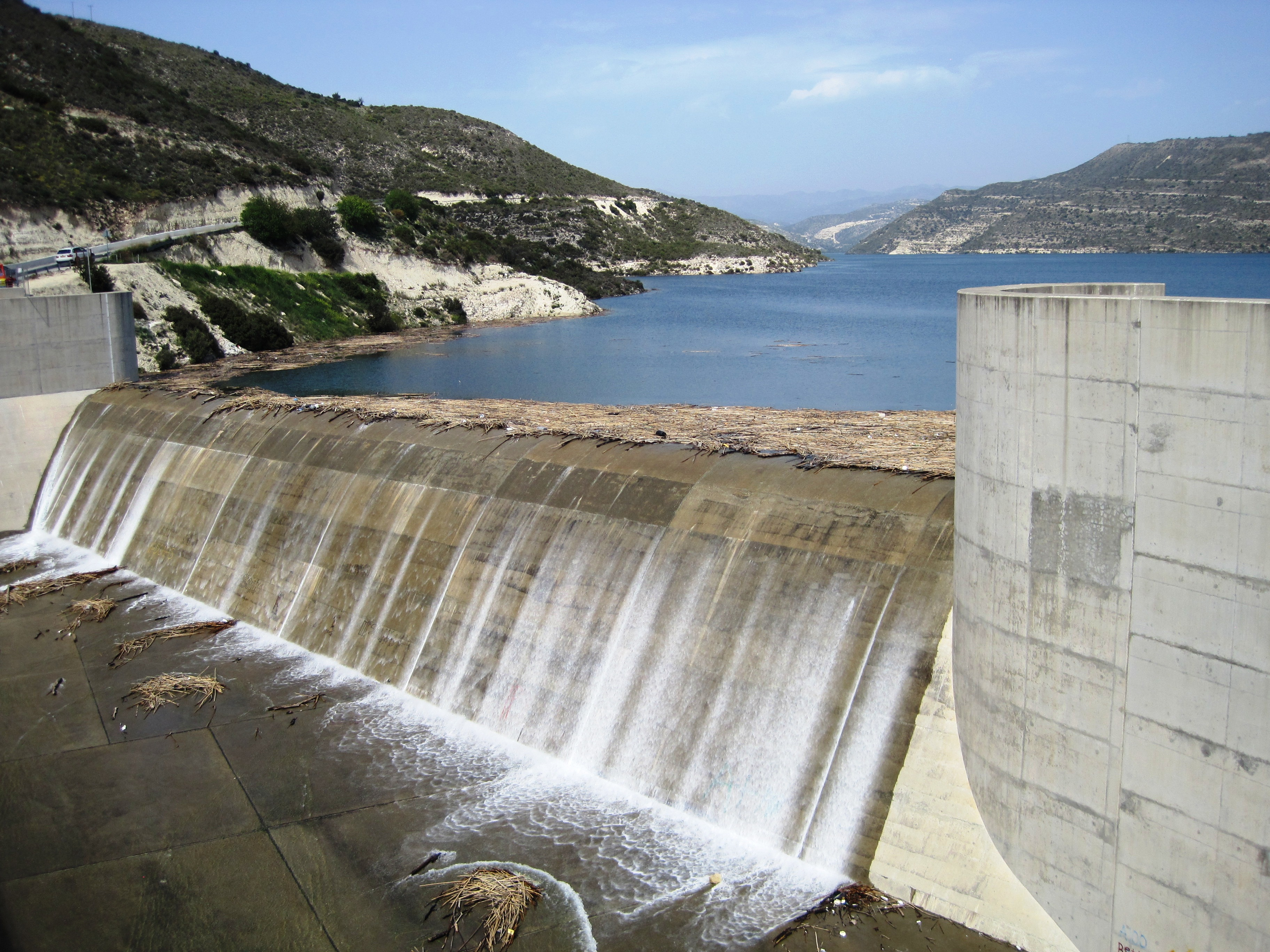
- Kouris dam in 2012
- Interactive map of Kouris Dam
- Official name: Kouris Dam (Φράγμα Κούρη)
- Location: Limassol District, Cyprus
- Coordinates: 34°43′40″N 32°55′5″E
- Construction began: Sept 1, 1984
- Opening date: 1988
- Operator: Cyprus Water Board

Dam and spillways
- Impounds: River Kouris
- Height: 110 m

Reservoir
- Total capacity: 115,000,000 m^{3}
- Surface area: 3.6 km^{3}
- Current storage level

Kouris Dam, Greek: Φράγμα Κούρη, is the largest dam of a network of 107 dams in Cyprus. It is in the Limassol District and is fed by the Kouris River along with other smaller watercourses including the Diarizos River, which has its water diverted to Kouris Dam through the Diarizos Diversion System, an underground carrier tunnel. The Kouris Dam is the western terminus of the main conveyor of the Southern Conveyor Project.

== History ==
The dam lies at an altitude of 250 metres (820 ft) and collects the water delivered by the rivers Kouris, Limnatis and Kryos. Furthermore, water from Diarizos River is diverted to Kouris Dam via a 14.5 kilometres (9 mi) long connecting tunnel. It has an overall catchment area of 300 kilometres (190 mi)^{2}. The dam is located 15 kilometres (9.3 mi) northwest of the city of Limassol and 6 kilometres (3.7 mi) west of the village of Ypsonas. For its construction the whole village of Alassa had to be relocated to a nearby site overlooking the reservoir (between the Kouris and Limnatis valleys) at a cost of around CYP£5,000,000.

Its construction was opposed by environmental groups concerned about the effects of water diversion on the Limassol Salt Lake, a wetland located downstream to the rivers and used by migratory birds. The dam is part of the Southern Conveyor Project, which carries water from southwest Cyprus to the southeast, over a distance of 120 km. The dam has a central clay core zoned earthfill embankment with a height of 110m and a crest length of approximately 550 metres providing a water storage volume of 115 million cubic metres.

The construction of the dam was first proposed by the Cyprus Water Development board in 1968. Following several feasibility studies the French engineering company Sogreah completed the detailed design in 1981. The contract for its construction was awarded in January 1984 to a consortium comprising J&P construction and Impregilo of Italy.

The construction cost amounted to CYP £29,000,000. Part of the funding came from the European Investment Bank. Construction was completed in September 1988. It was officially inaugurated by the then president, George Vassiliou, on 22 April 1989.

Since its construction it has overflowed three times: on March 4, 2004, on April 6, 2012, and on January 7, 2020.

== In popular culture ==
In 2008, rumours held that a crocodile or other large reptile was swimming in the dam, leading to humorous references to a "Cyprus Loch Ness Monster." Local community leaders authorized a search but did not find such a creature.

== Gallery ==
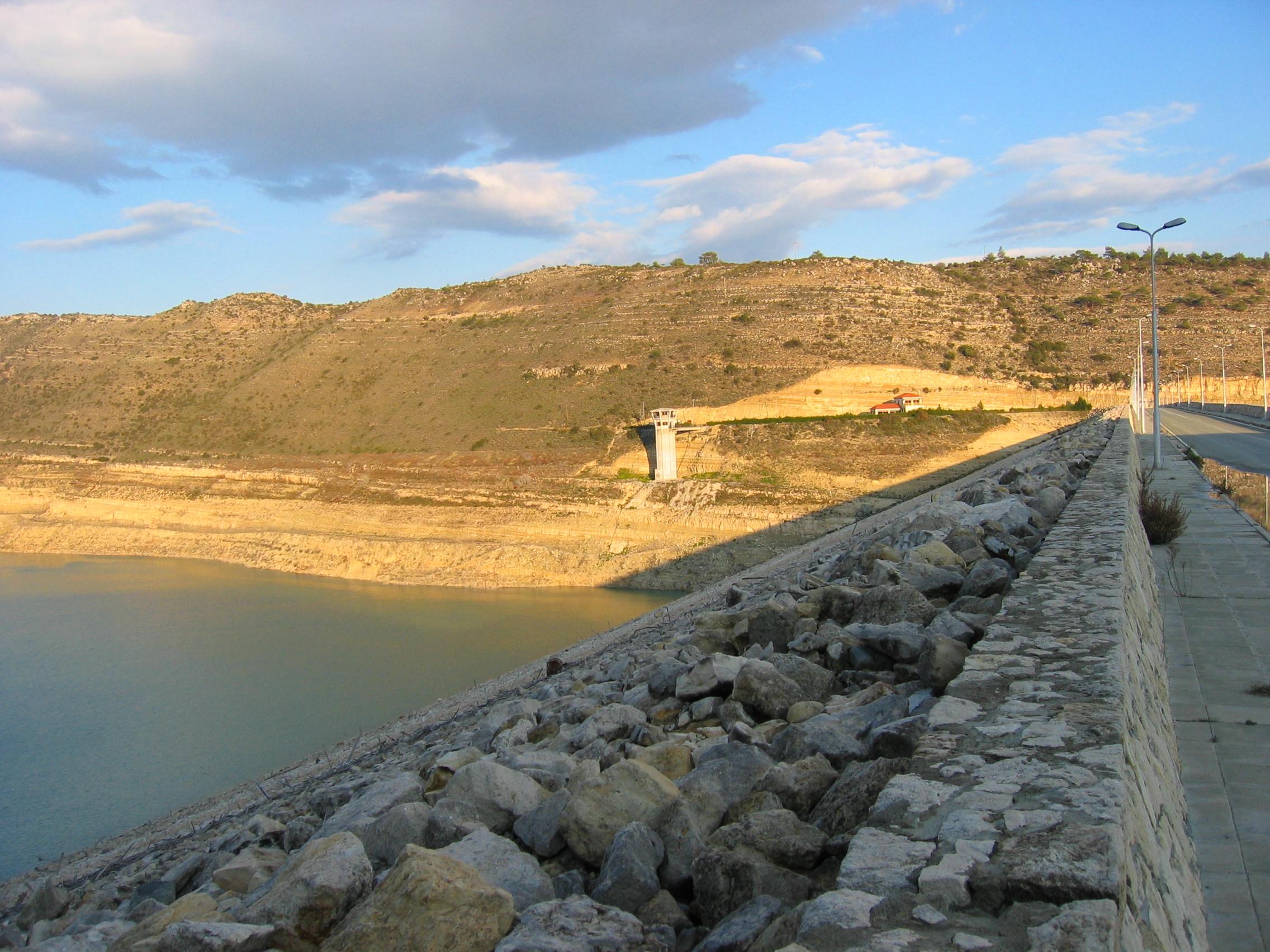
Road photo of Kouris dam

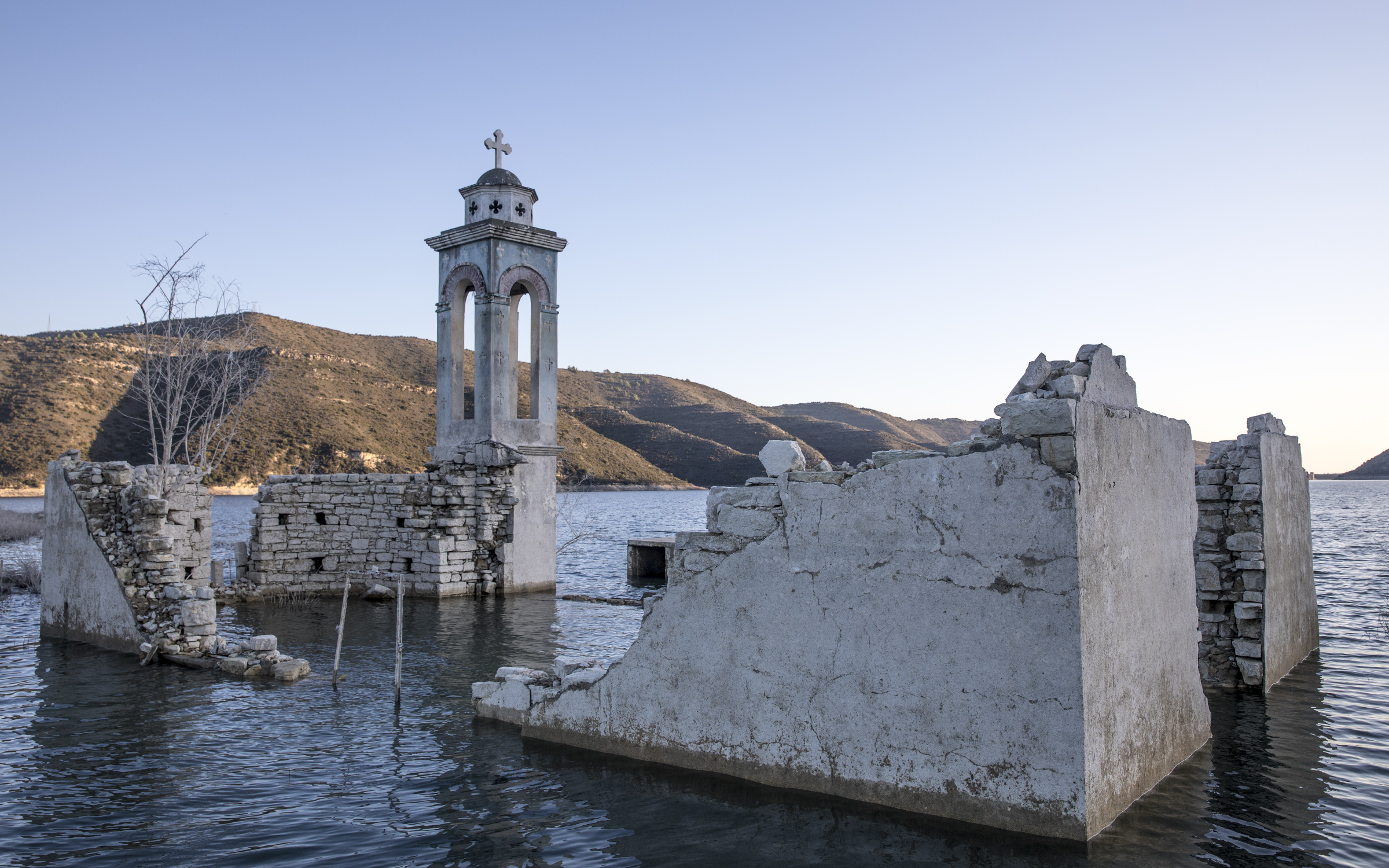
Ruined Church of Ayios Nikolas in Kouris Dam

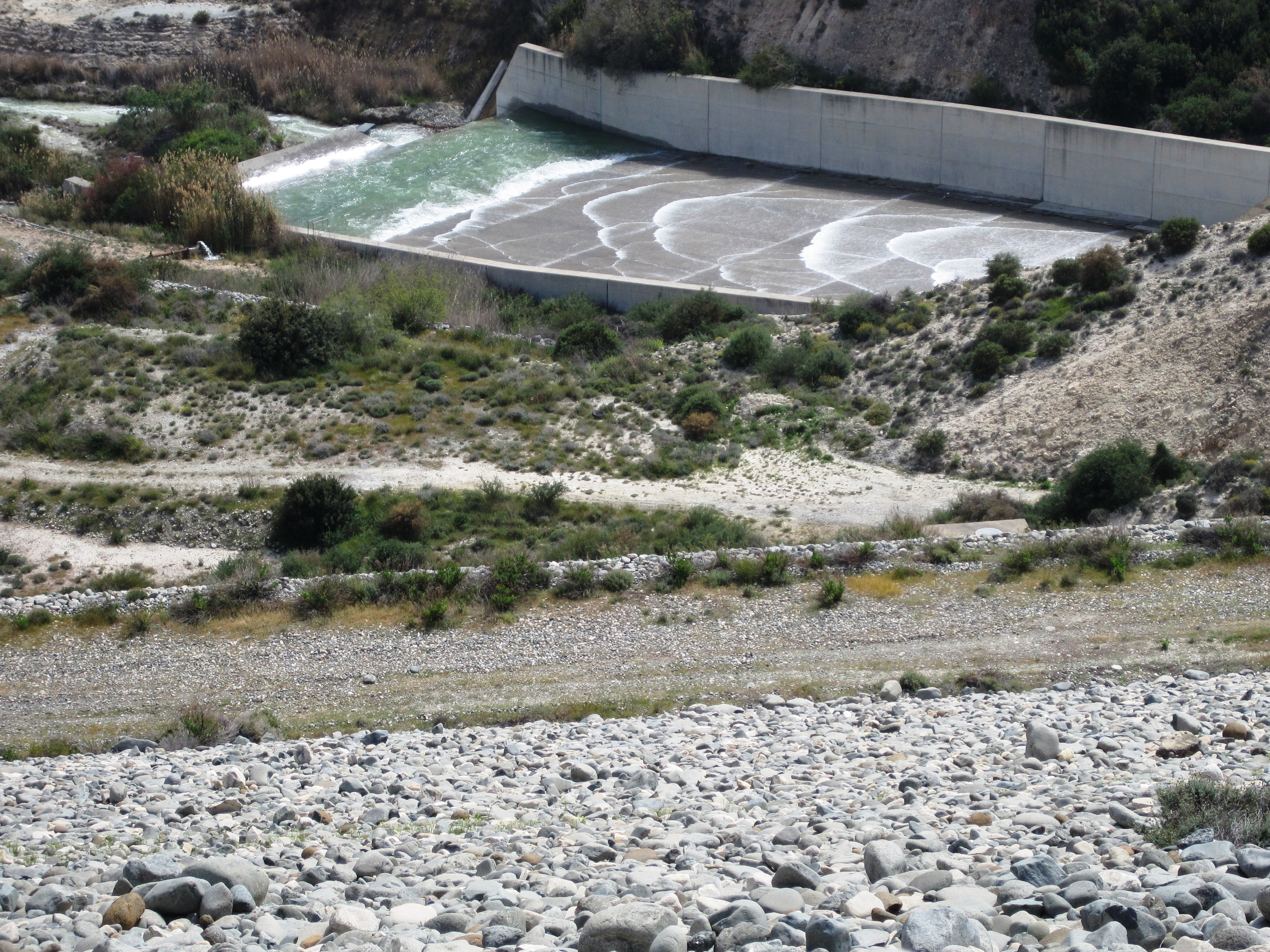
Kouris Dam - overflow day 8 April 2012

== See also ==
- List of reservoirs and dams in Cyprus
