= Asprokremmos Dam =

Asprokremmos dam
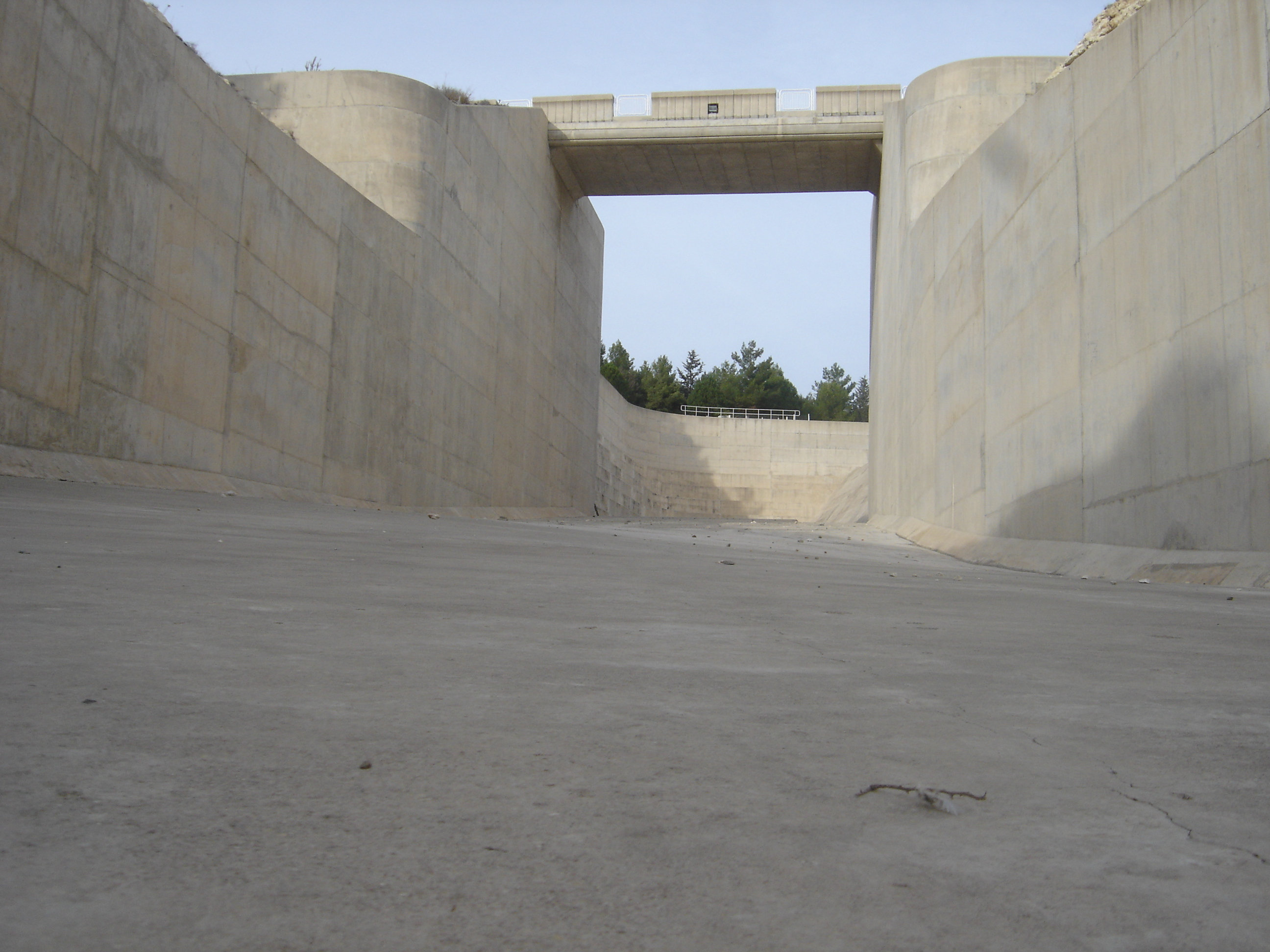
- Dam's spillway
- Interactive map of Asprokremmos dam
- Official name: Asprokremmos dam
- Location: Paphos District, Cyprus
- Coordinates: 34.72°N 32.55°E
- Construction began: May 1978
- Opening date: December 1982
- Operator: Cyprus Water Board

Dam and spillways
- Impounds: Xeros river
- Height: 53 m
- Length: 700 m
- Width (base): 220 m

Reservoir
- Total capacity: 52,375,000 m3
- Catchment area: 227 km^{2}
- Surface area: 2590 km^{2}
- Current storage level

Asprokremmos dam bridge
- Coordinates: 34°44′08″N 32°33′33″E

Characteristics
- Width: 16 m

Location
- Interactive map of Asprokremmos dam bridge

Asprokremmos dam is the second largest dam in Cyprus. It is built at an altitude of about 100 m above sea level and is located 16 km, (10 miles) east of the city of Pafos.

Due to poor rainfall it is a rare event that the dam overflows. On 27 January 2012 the dam did overflow, for the first time since 2004.

It subsequently overflowed again in March 2019 and again in January 2020.

It is considered an important wetland for endemic and migratory birds.

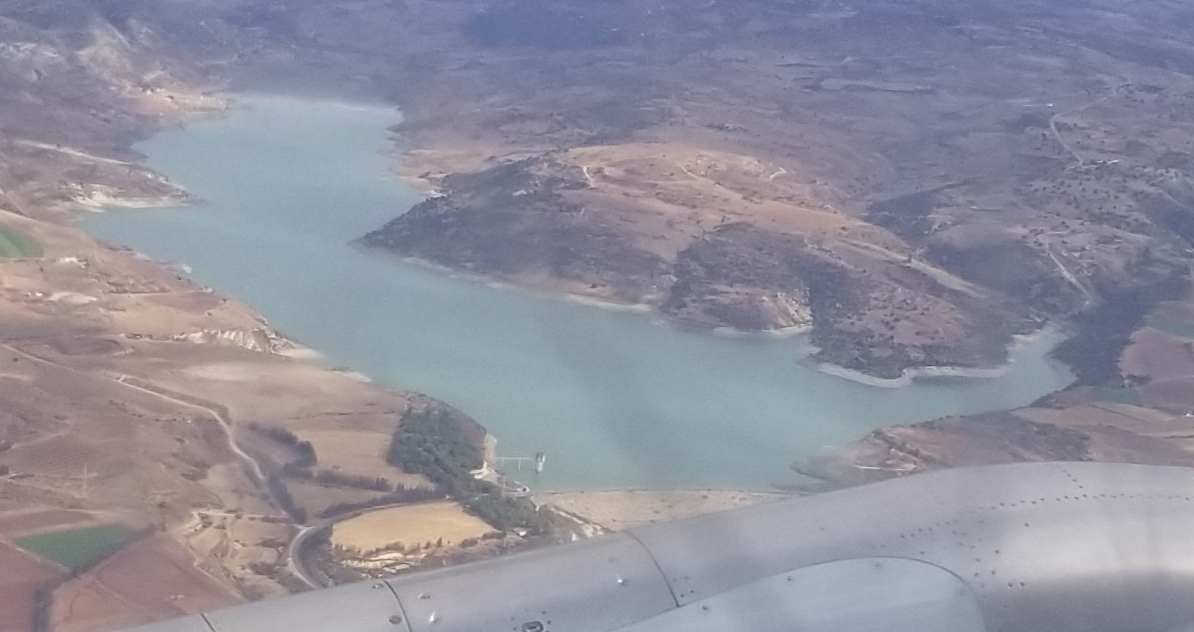

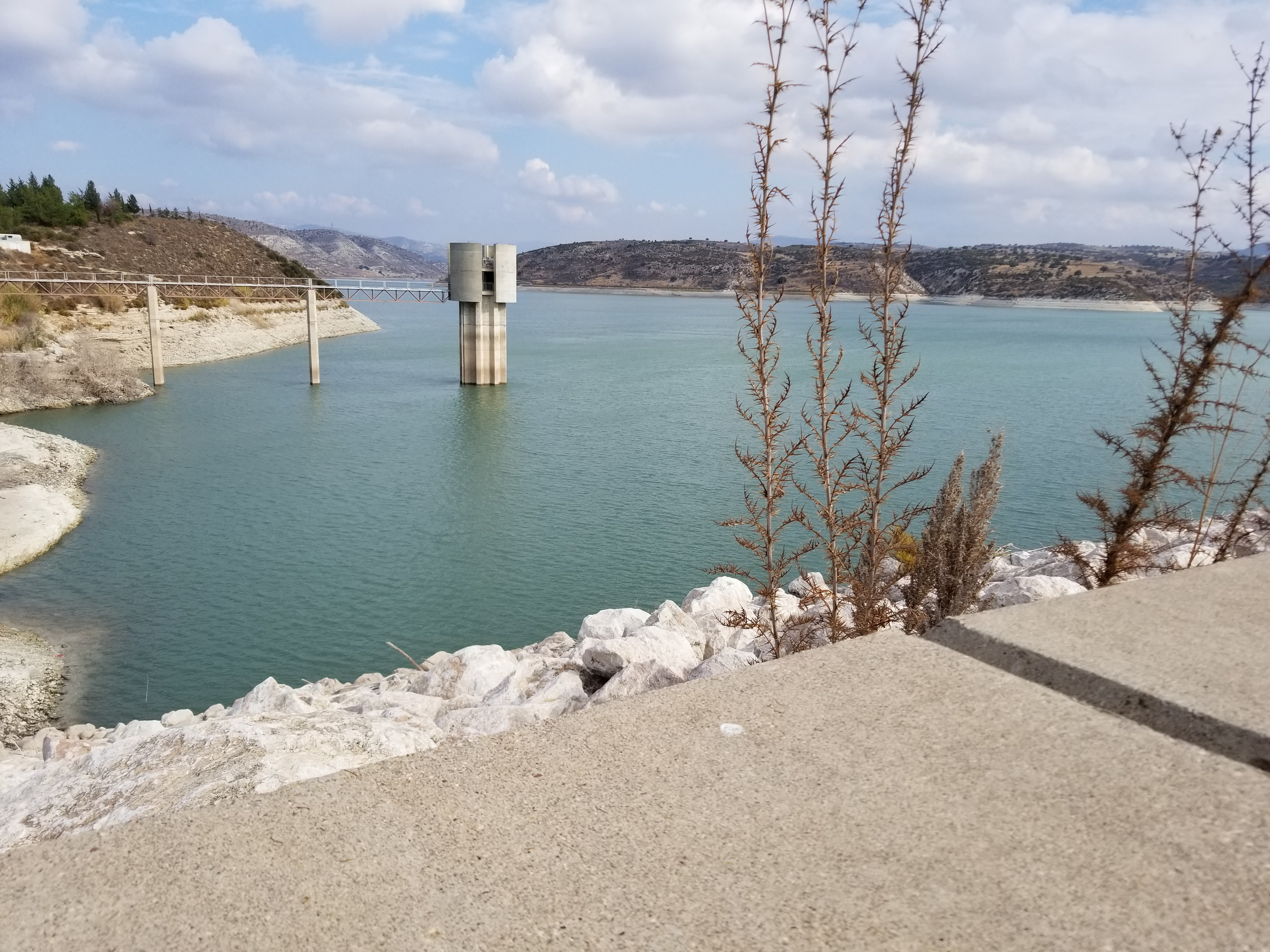

== See also ==
- List of reservoirs and dams in Cyprus
