= Sarıağaç =

- Neighbourhood
- Location in Turkey
- Coordinates: 36°13′N 32°51′E
- Country: Turkey
- Province: Mersin
- District: Anamur
- Elevation: 220 m (720 ft)
- Population (2022): 180
- Time zone: UTC+3 (TRT)
- Area code: 0324

Sarıağaç is a neighbourhood in the municipality and district of Anamur, Mersin Province, Turkey. Its population is 180 (2022). It is situated in the Toros Mountains, 20 kilometres (12 mi) north of Anamur. It is planned that a part of the village (along with Akine, Çaltıbükü and Ormancık) will be submerged in Alaköprü Dam reservoir.
