= Salamiou =

Village in Paphos District, Cyprus

Salamiou Σαλαμιού
- Location in Cyprus
- Coordinates: 34°50′24″N 32°41′23″E
- Country: Cyprus
- District: Paphos District

Population (2001)
  - Total: 255
- Time zone: UTC+2 (EET)
  - Summer (DST): UTC+3 (EEST)
- Postal code: 6211

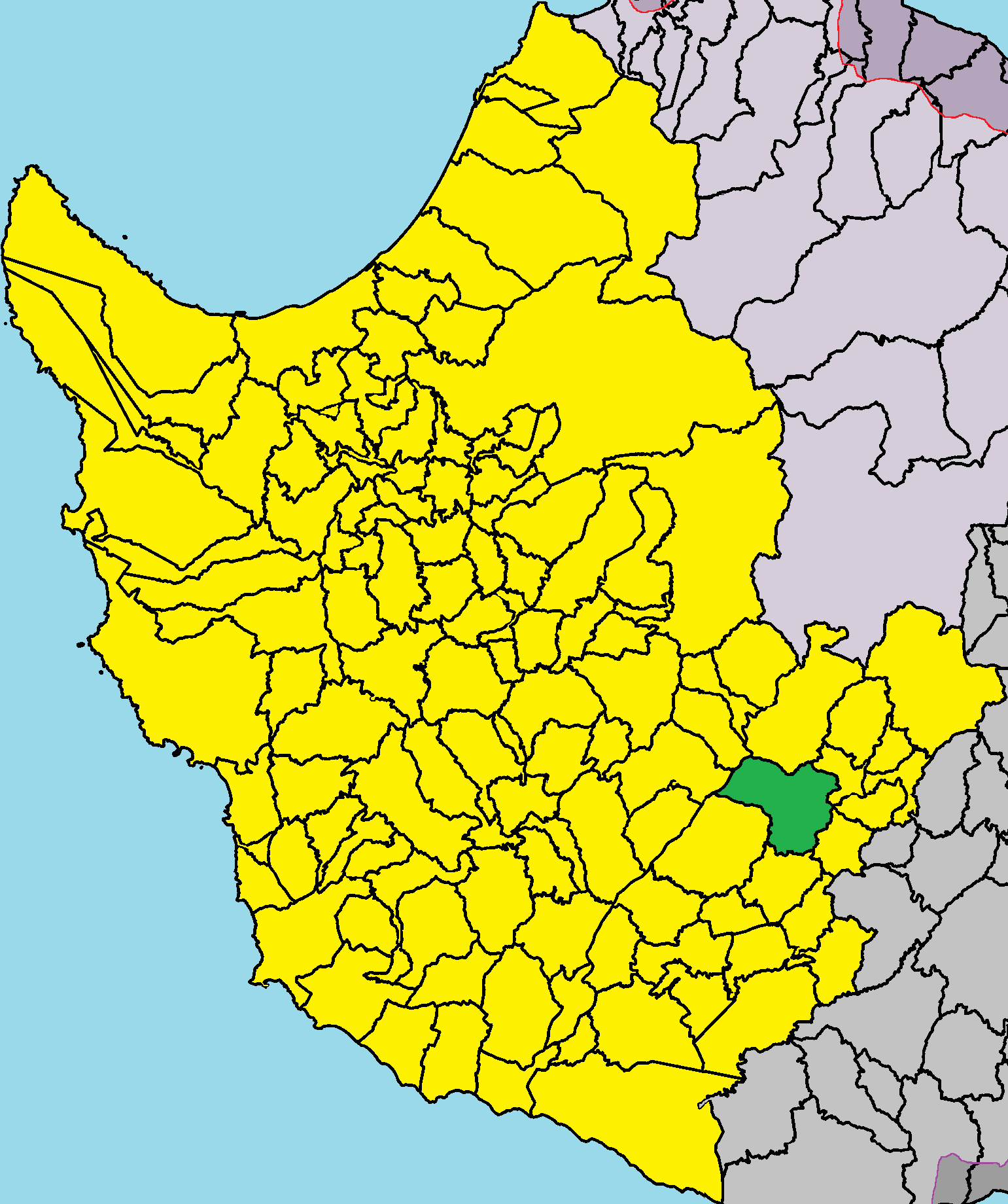
Salamiou in the Paphos District.

Salamiou (Greek: Σαλαμιού) is a village in the Paphos District of Cyprus, located 6 km northeast of Kelokedara. The population was estimated to be around 270 in 2015 with a population density of 16.9 / km².
