= Alaköprü Dam =

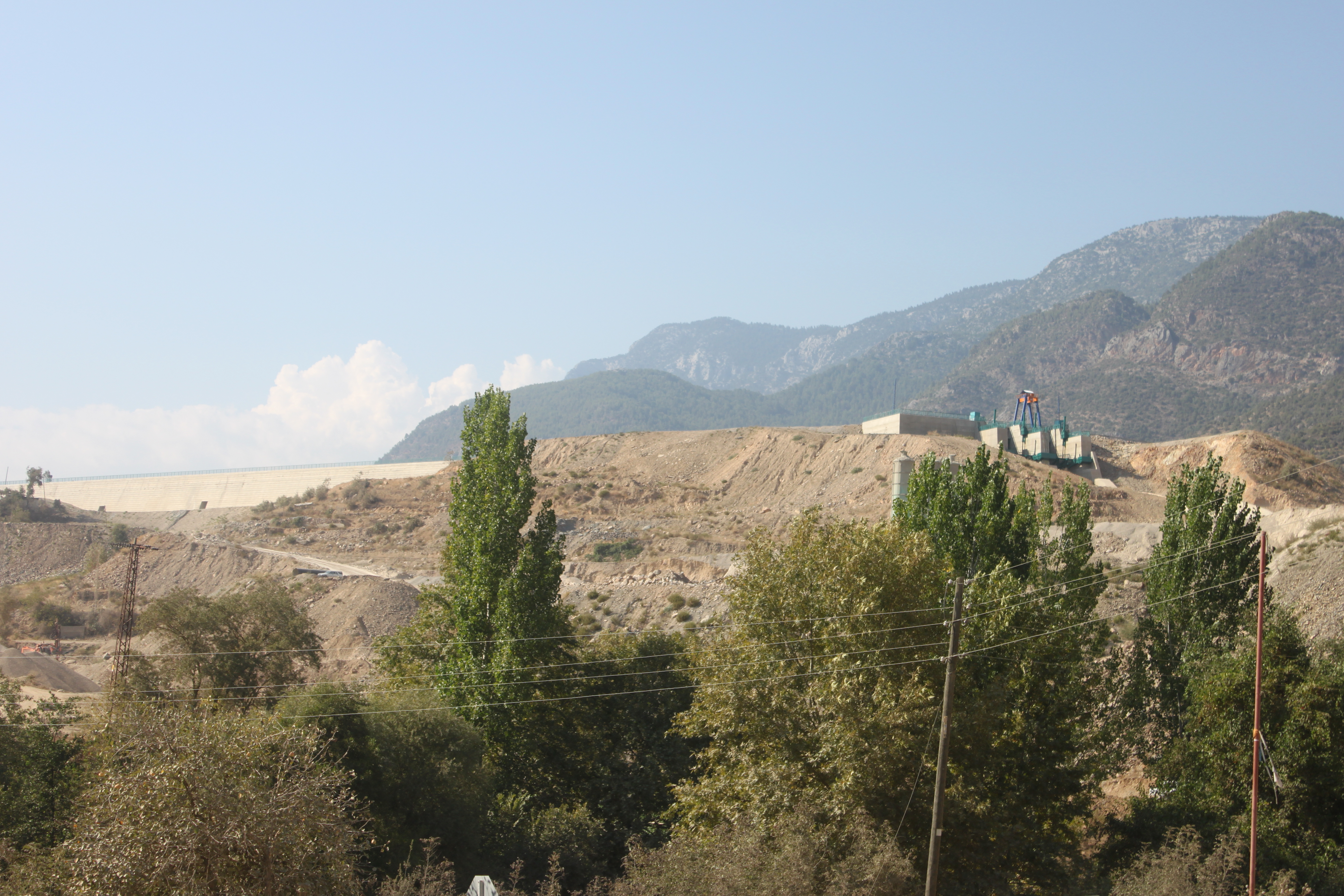

- Location within Turkey
- Country: Turkey
- Location: Anamur, Mersin Province
- Coordinates: 36°10′53.05″N 32°53′44.55″E
- Purpose: Water supply, power
- Status: Operational
- Construction began: November 2, 2010
- Opening date: March 7, 2014

Dam and spillways
- Type of dam: Embankment, concrete-face rock-fill
- Impounds: Anamur (Dragon) Creek
- Height: 93 m (305 ft)
- Length: 385.40 m (1,264 ft)
- Dam volume: 2,008,000 m^{3} (2,626,365 cu yd)
- Spillway type: Controlled chute, two radial gates
- Spillway capacity: 893.50 m^{3}/s (31,554 cu ft/s)

Reservoir
- Total capacity: 130,500,000 m^{3} (105,798 acre⋅ft)
- Active capacity: 86,500,000 m^{3} (70,127 acre⋅ft)
- Inactive capacity: 44,000,000 m^{3} (35,671 acre⋅ft)
- Catchment area: 210.90 km^{2} (81.43 mi^{2})

Power Station
- Commission date: 2015 est.
- Type: Conventional
- Installed capacity: 26 MW
- Annual generation: 111.27 GWh

Alaköprü Dam (Turkish: Alaköprü Barajı) is a concrete-face rock-fill dam on the Anamur (Dragon) Creek in Anamur district of Mersin Province, southern Turkey. The development is backed by the Turkish State Hydraulic Works (DSİ). The dam was primarily built as part of the Northern Cyprus Water Supply Project, to supply water for drinking and irrigation to Northern Cyprus.

Preliminary construction on the dam began on November 2, 2010 and the official groundbreaking took place on March 7, 2011. After the completion of the 560 m (1,840 ft) long diversion tunnel, construction of the dam started on August 9, 2012 with placement of the foundation. The dam was completed on schedule, on March 7, 2014 but its reservoir did not begin to collect water until February 2015. The dam's 26 MW hydroelectric power station is expected to be commissioned in 2015.

Up to 75,000,000 m^{3} (61,000 acre⋅ft) water from the dam's reservoir, which makes more than half of its capacity, will be transferred to Geçitköy Dam in Northern Cyprus via an 80 km (50 mi) pipeline crossing the Mediterranean Sea under 250 m (820 ft) depth.

Part of the populated places in the area such as the villages of Sarıağaç, Akine, Çaltıbükü and Ormancık will be submerged in the reservoir of Alaköprü Dam.

== See also ==
- List of dams and reservoirs in Turkey
