= List of populated places in Mersin Province =

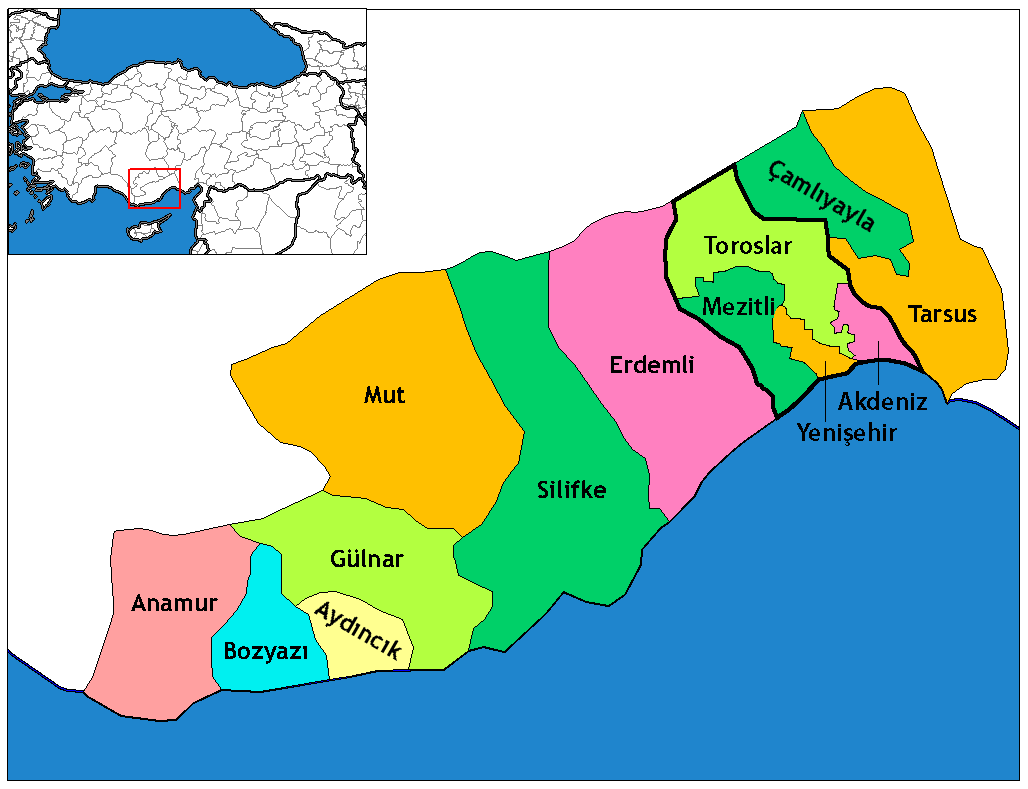
Mersin Province

Below is the list of populated places in Mersin Province, Turkey by the ilçes (districts).

== Akdeniz ==
Akdeniz

- Abdullahşahutoğlu
- Adanalıoğlu
- Adnan Menderes
- Akdam
- Akdeniz
- Anadolu
- Aşağı Burhan
- Bağcılar-Ihsaniye
- Bağlarbaşı
- Bahçe
- Bahşiş
- Barış
- Bekirde
- Camili
- Camişerif
- Çankaya
- Çay
- Çilek
- Civanyaylağı
- Cumhuriyet
- Demirhisar
- Dikilitaş
- Emek
- Esenli
- Evci
- Evren
- Gazi
- Gündoğdu
- Güneş
- Hal
- Hamidiye
- Hebilli
- Hürriyet
- Iğdır
- İhsaniye
- Karacailyas
- Karaduvar
- Kazanlı
- Kiremithane
- Köselerli
- Kulak
- Kültür
- Kürkçü
- Limonlu
- Mahmudiye
- Mesudiye
- Mitatpaşa
- Müfide Ilhan
- Nacarlı
- Nusratiye
- Özgürlük
- Parmakkurdu
- Puğkaracadağ
- Şakirgülmen
- Sarıibrahimli
- Şevket Sümer
- Siteler
- Toroslar
- Turgut Reis
- Üçocak
- Yanpar
- Yenimahalle
- Yeşilçimen
- Yeşilova
- Yukarı Burhan

== Anamur ==
Anamur

- Akarca
- Akdeniz
- Akine
- Alataş
- Anıtlı
- Aşağıkükür
- Bahçe
- Bahçelievler
- Boğuntu
- Bozdoğan
- Çaltıbükü
- Çamlıpınar
- Çamlıpınaralanı
- Çarıklar
- Çataloluk
- Çeltikçi
- Çukurabanoz
- Demirören
- Emirşah
- Esentepe
- Evciler
- Fatih
- Gercebahşiş
- Göktaş
- Güleç
- Güneybahşiş
- Güngören
- Güzelyurt
- İskele
- Kalınören
- Karaağa
- Karaçukur
- Karadere
- Karalarbahşiş
- Kaşdişlen
- Kılıç
- Kızılaliler
- Köprübaşı
- Korucuk
- Kükür
- Lale
- Malaklar
- Ören
- Ormancık
- Ovabaşı
- Sağlık
- Saray
- Sarıağaç
- Sarıdana
- Sugözü
- Sultan Alaattin
- Toroslar
- Uçarı
- Yalıevleri
- Yeşilyurt
- Yıldırımbeyazıt

== Aydıncık ==
Aydıncık

- Atatürk
- Cumhuriyet
- Duruhan
- Eskiyürük
- Hacıbahattin
- Hürriyet
- Karadere
- Karaseki
- Merkez
- Pembecik
- Teknecik
- Yeni
- Yenikaş
- Yeniyürük
- Yeniyürükkaş

== Bozyazı ==
Bozyazı

- Akcami
- Ardıçlıtaş
- Bahçekoyağı
- Beyreli
- Çopurlu
- Çubukkoyağı
- Denizciler
- Derebaşı
- Dereköy
- Elmakuzu
- Gözce
- Gözsüzce
- Gürlevik
- Kaledibi
- Karaisalı
- Kızılca
- Kömürlü
- Kötekler
- Lenger
- Merkez
- Narince
- Sıcakyurt
- Tekedüzü
- Tekeli
- Tekmen
- Ustalar

== Çamlıyayla ==
Çamlıyayla

- Bağçatağı
- Belçınar
- Çayırekinliği
- Cumayakası
- Darıpınarı
- Fakılar
- Giden
- Kale
- Kesecik
- Körmenlik
- Korucak
- Sarıkavak
- Sarıkoyak
- Sebil

== Erdemli ==
Erdemli

- Adnan Menderes
- Akdeniz
- Akpınar
- Alata
- Alibeyli
- Arpaçbahşiş
- Arslanlı
- Ayaş
- Aydınlar
- Barbaros
- Batısandal
- Çamlı
- Çerçili
- Çeşmeli
- Çiftepınar
- Çiriş
- Dağlı
- Doğusandal
- Elbeyli
- Elvanlı
- Esenpınar
- Evdilek
- Fakılı
- Fatih
- Gücüş
- Güneyli
- Güzeloluk
- Hacıalanı
- Hacıhalilarpaç
- Harfilli
- Hüsametli
- İlemin
- Karaahmetli
- Karahıdırlı
- Karakeşli
- Karayakup
- Kargıcak
- Kargıpınarı
- Kayacı
- Kızılen
- Kızkalesi
- Kocahasanlı
- Koramşalı
- Kösbucağı
- Kösereli
- Koyuncu
- Kuşluca
- Küstülü
- Limonlu
- Merkez
- Pınarbaşı
- Şahna
- Sarıkaya
- Sarıyer
- Sinap
- Sıraç
- Sorgun
- Tabiye
- Tapureli
- Tırtar
- Tömük
- Toros
- Tozlu
- Türbe
- Üçtepe
- Üzümlü
- Veyselli
- Yağda
- Yarenler
- Yeniyurt
- Yüksek

== Gülnar ==
Gülnar

- Akdeniz
- Akova
- Ardıçpınarı
- Arıkuyusu
- Ayvalı
- Bereket
- Beydili
- Bolyaran
- Bozağaç
- Büyükeceli
- Çavuşlar
- Çukurasma
- Çukurkonak
- Dayıcık
- Dedeler
- Delikkaya
- Demirözü
- Emirhacı
- Gezende
- Göktürk
- Hacıpınar
- Halifeler
- Ilısu
- İshaklar
- Kavakoluğu
- Kayrak
- Koçaşlı
- Konur
- Korucuk
- Köseçobanlı
- Kurbağa
- Kuskan
- Mollaömerli
- Örenpınar
- Örtülü
- Saray
- Sarıkavak
- Şeyhömer
- Sipahili
- Taşoluk
- Tepe
- Tırnak
- Tozkovan
- Üçoluk
- Ulupınar
- Yanışlı
- Yarmasu
- Yassıbağ
- Yenice
- Zeyne

== Mezitli ==
Mezitli

- 75. Yıl
- Akarca
- Akdeniz
- Anayurt
- Atatürk
- Bozön
- Çamlıca
- Çankaya
- Cemilli
- Çevlik
- Cumhuriyet
- Davultepe
- Demirışık
- Deniz
- Doğançay
- Doğlu
- Esenbağlar
- Eski Mezitli
- Fatih
- Fındıkpınarı
- Hürriyet
- İstiklal
- Kaleköy
- Kocayer
- Kuyuluk
- Kuzucu
- Kuzucubelen
- Menderes
- Merkez
- Pelitkoyağı
- Şahintepesi
- Sarılar
- Seymenli
- Takanlı
- Tece
- Tepeköy
- Tol
- Viranşehir
- Yenimahalle
- Zeybekler

== Mut ==
Mut

- Alaçam
- Aşağıköselerli
- Aydınoğlu
- Bağcağız
- Ballı
- Barabanlı
- Bozdoğan
- Burunköy
- Çağlayangedik
- Çaltılı
- Çamlıca
- Çampınar
- Çatakbağ
- Çatalharman
- Ceritler
- Çınarlı
- Çivi
- Çömelek
- Çortak
- Çukurbağ
- Cumhuriyet
- Dağpazarı
- Demirkapı
- Dereköy
- Derinçay
- Deveci
- Diştaş
- Doğancı
- Elbeyli
- Elmapınar
- Esençay
- Evren
- Fakırca
- Geçimli
- Gençali
- Göcekler
- Gökçetaş
- Göksu
- Güllük
- Güme
- Güzelköy
- Güzelyurt
- Hacıahmetli
- Hacıilyaslı
- Hacınuhlu
- Hacısait
- Hamamköy
- Haydarköy
- Hisarköy
- Hocalı
- İbrahimli
- Ilıca
- Irmaklı
- Işıklar
- Kadıköy
- Kale
- Karacaoğlan
- Karadiken
- Karşıyaka
- Kavaklı
- Kavaközü
- Kayabaşı
- Kayaönü
- Kelceköy
- Kemenli
- Kırkkavak
- Kışlaköy
- Kızılalan
- Köselerli
- Kültür
- Kumaçukuru
- Kürkçü
- Kurtsuyu
- Kurtuluş
- Meydan
- Mirahor
- Mucuk
- Narlı
- Narlıdere
- Ortaköy
- Özköy
- Özlü
- Palantepe
- Pamuklu
- Pınarbaşı
- Sakız
- Sarıveliler
- Selamlı
- Suçatı
- Tekeli
- Topkaya
- Topluca
- Tuğrul
- Yalnızcabağ
- Yapıntı
- Yatırtaş
- Yazalanı
- Yeşilköy
- Yeşilyurt
- Yıldızköy
- Yukarıköselerli
- Zeytinçukuru

== Silifke ==
Silifke

- Akdere
- Arkum
- Atakent
- Atayurt
- Atik
- Ayaştürkmenli
- Bahçe
- Bahçederesi
- Balandız
- Bayındır
- Bolacalıkoyuncu
- Bucaklı
- Bükdeğirmeni
- Burunucu
- Çadırlı
- Çaltıbozkır
- Cambazlı
- Camikebir
- Çamlıbel
- Çamlıca
- Çatak
- Çeltikçi
- Cılbayır
- Demircili
- Ekşiler
- Evkafçiftliği
- Gazi
- Gedikpınarı
- Gökbelen
- Göksu
- Gülümpaşalı
- Gündüzler
- Hırmanlı
- Hüseyinler
- İmambekirli
- İmamlı
- İmamuşağı
- Işıklı
- Kabasakallı
- Karahacılı
- Karakaya
- Kargıcak
- Kavak
- Keben
- Kepez
- Keşlitürkmenli
- Kıca
- Kırtıl
- Kızılgeçit
- Kocaoluk
- Kocapınar
- Kurtuluş
- Mara
- Mukaddem
- Narlıkuyu
- Nasrullah
- Nuru
- Ören
- Ortaören
- Ovacık
- Özboynuinceli
- Öztürkmenli
- Pazarkaşı
- Pelitpınarı
- Sabak
- Şahmurlu
- Saray
- Sarıaydın
- Sarıcalar
- Say
- Sayağzı
- Senir
- Seydili
- Seyranlık
- Sökün
- Sömek
- Taşucu
- Toros
- Tosmurlu
- Türkmenuşağı
- Ulugöz
- Uşakpınarı
- Uzuncaburç
- Yeğenli
- Yenibahçe
- Yenimahalle
- Yenisu
- Yeşilovacık

== Tarsus ==
Tarsus

- 82 Evler
- Ağzıdelik
- Akarsu
- Akçakocalı
- Akgedik
- Akşemsettin
- Aladağ
- Aliağa
- Alibeyli
- Aliefendioğlu
- Alifakı
- Altaylılar
- Anıt
- Ardıçlı
- Arıklı
- Atalar
- Atatürk
- Avadan
- Bağlar
- Baharlı
- Bahçe
- Bahşiş
- Ballıca
- Baltalı
- Barbaros
- Belen
- Beydeğirmeni
- Beylice
- Boğazpınar
- Böğrüeğri
- Bolatlı
- Boztepe
- Büyükkösebalcı
- Çağbaşı
- Çağlayan
- Çakırlı
- Çamalan
- Camilimanda
- Caminur
- Çamtepe
- Çatalca
- Çavdarlı
- Çavuşlu
- Çevreli
- Çiçekli
- Çiftlik
- Cin
- Cırbıklar
- Çiriştepe
- Çokak
- Çöplü
- Çukurbağ
- Cumhuriyet
- Dadalı
- Damlama
- Dedeler
- Dorak
- Duatepe
- Egemen
- Eminlik
- Emirler
- Ergenekon
- Esenler
- Eskiömerli
- Eskişehir
- Fahrettinpaşa
- Fatih
- Ferahimşalvuz
- Fevzi Çakmak
- Gaziler
- Gazipaşa
- Girne
- Göçük
- Gömmece
- Gözlükule
- Gülek
- Günyurdu
- Hacıbozan
- Hacıhamzalı
- Halitağa
- Hasanağa
- Heleke
- Hürriyet
- İbrişim
- İncirgediği
- İncirlikuyu
- İnköy
- İsmetpaşa
- Kaburgediği
- Kadelli
- Kaklıktaşı
- Kaleburcu
- Kanberhüyüğü
- Karaçerçili
- Karadiken
- Karadirlik
- Karakütük
- Karayayla
- Kargılı
- Karsavran
- Kavaklı
- Kayadibi
- Kefeli
- Kelahmet
- Kemalpaşa
- Kerimler
- Keşli
- Kırıt
- Kırklarsırtı
- Kızılçukur
- Kızılmurat
- Kocaköy
- Koçmarlı
- Konaklar
- Körlü Beyi
- Kösebalcı
- Köselerli
- Kozoluk
- Kulak
- Kumdere
- Kurbanlı
- Kurtçukuru
- Kuşçular
- Kütüklü
- Mahmutağa
- Mantaş
- Meşelik
- Mithatpaşa
- Muratlı
- Nemiroğlu
- Öğretmenler
- Olukkoyağı
- Özbek
- Özlüce
- Pirömerli
- Reşadiye
- Sağlıklı
- Şahin
- Sandal
- Sanlıca
- Sarıveli
- Sayköy
- Şehit Kerim
- Şehit Mustafa
- Şehitishak
- Şehitler Tepesi
- Simithacılı
- Sıraköy
- Sucular
- Takbaş
- Taşçılı
- Taşkuyu
- Taşobası
- Tekeliören
- Tekke
- Tepeçaylak
- Tepeköy
- Tepetaşpınar
- Topaklı
- Topçu
- Tozkoparanzahit
- Ulaş
- Verimli
- Yalamık
- Yanıkkışla
- Yaramış
- Yarbay Şemsettin
- Yazlık
- Yeni Ömerli
- Yeniçay
- Yenice
- Yeniköy
- Yenimahalle
- Yeşilevler
- Yeşilmahalle
- Yeşiltepe
- Yeşilyurt
- Yüksek
- Yunusemre
- Yunusoğlu

== Toroslar ==
Toroslar

- Akbelen
- Aladağ
- Alanyalı
- Alsancak
- Arpaçsakarlar
- Arslanköy
- Atlılar
- Ayvagediği
- Bekiralanı
- Buluklu
- Çağdaşkent
- Çağlarca
- Çamlıdere
- Çandır
- Çavuşlu
- Çelebili
- Çopurlu
- Çukurova
- Dalakdere
- Darısekisi
- Değirmendere
- Değnek
- Demirtaş
- Doruklu
- Düğdüören
- Evrenli
- Gözne
- Güneykent
- Güzelyayla
- H. Okan Merzeci
- Halkkent
- Hamzabeyli
- Horozlu
- Işıktepe
- Karaisalı
- Kaşlı
- Kavaklıpınar
- Kayrakkeşli
- Kepirli
- Kerimler
- Kızılkaya
- Korucular
- Korukent
- Kurdali
- Kurudere
- Mevlana
- Mithat Toroğlu
- Musalı
- Mustafa Kemal
- Osmaniye
- Portakal
- Resulköy
- Sağlık
- Şahinpınarı
- Selçuklar
- Soğucak
- Tırtar
- Toroslar
- Tozkoparan
- Turgut Türkalp
- Turunçlu
- Yalınayak
- Yavca
- Yeniköy
- Yüksekoluk
- Yusuf Kılıç
- Zeki Ayan

== Yenişehir ==
Yenişehir

- 50. Yıl
- Akkent
- Aydınlıkevler
- Bahçelievler
- Barbaros
- Batıkent
- Çavak
- Çiftlikköy
- Çukurkeşli
- Cumhuriyet
- Değirmençay
- Deniz
- Dumlupınar
- Eğriçam
- Emirler
- Fuat Morel
- Gazi
- Gökçebelen
- Güvenevler
- Hürriyet
- İnönü
- İnsu
- Karahacılı
- Kocahamzalı
- Kocavilayet
- Kuzeykent
- Limonluk
- Menteş
- Palmiye
- Pirireis
- Turunçlu
- Uzunkaş
