= Bolatlı, Tarsus =

Bolatlı
- Neighbourhood
- Location in Turkey
- Coordinates: 36°57′N 34°51′E
- Country: Turkey
- Province: Mersin
- District: Tarsus
- Elevation: 45 m (148 ft)
- Population (2022): 1,780
- Time zone: UTC+3 (TRT)
- Area code: 0324

Bolatlı is a neighbourhood in the municipality and district of Tarsus, Mersin Province, Turkey. Its population is 1,780 (2022). It is situated in the Çukurova plain along the Berdan River and south of the Çukurova motorway. Bolatlı is almost merged with Tarsus and 35 kilometres (22 mi) west of Mersin.
