= Karadirlik =

- Neighbourhood
- Location in Turkey
- Coordinates: 37°01′N 34°49′E
- Country: Turkey
- Province: Mersin
- District: Tarsus
- Elevation: 180 m (590 ft)
- Population (2022): 648
- Time zone: UTC+3 (TRT)
- Area code: 0324

Karadirlik is a neighbourhood in the municipality and district of Tarsus, Mersin Province, Turkey. Its population is 648 (2022). It is located in Çukurova (Cilicia of the antiquity) to the north of Tarsus. It is situated to the northwest of Berdan Dam reservoir and to the south of Keşbükü creek a branch of Berdan River. Its distance to Tarsus is 18 kilometres (11 mi) and its distance to Mersin is 45 kilometres (28 mi). Situated in the fertile plains, farming is the major economic activity. Olive, cucumber and grapes are the most important crops, and there are also some chicken farms. In 2010, the village and its fields suffered from a particularly bad hailstorm.
