= Özbek, Tarsus =

Özbek
- Neighbourhood
- Location in Turkey
- Coordinates: 36°58′N 34°57′E
- Country: Turkey
- Province: Mersin
- District: Tarsus
- Elevation: 40 m (130 ft)
- Population (2022): 1,078
- Time zone: UTC+3 (TRT)
- Area code: 0324

Özbek is a neighbourhood in the municipality and district of Tarsus, Mersin Province, Turkey. Its population is 1,078 (2022). It is situated in Çukurova (Cilicia of the antiquity) and to the northeast of Tarsus. It is between Turkish motorway O.51, a part of Çukurova Motorway and Turkish state highway D.750.It s distance to Tarsus is 5 kilometres (3.1 mi) and its distance to Mersin is 35 kilometres (22 mi).
