= Akgedik =

- Neighbourhood
- Location in Turkey
- Coordinates: 36°57′N 34°55′E
- Country: Turkey
- Province: Mersin
- District: Tarsus
- Elevation: 70 m (230 ft)
- Population (2022): 1,509
- Time zone: UTC+3 (TRT)
- Area code: 0324

Akgedik is a neighbourhood in the municipality and district of Tarsus, Mersin Province, Turkey. Its population is 1,509 (2022). It is situated in the Çukurova plains (Cilicia of the antiquity) to the south of Çukurova motorway and Berdan Dam reservoir. The distance to Tarsus is 5 kilometres (3.1 mi) and 30 kilometres (19 mi) to Mersin. Cotton and grape are the two main crops of the village.
