= Çevreli, Tarsus =

Çevreli
- Neighbourhood
- Location in Turkey
- Coordinates: 37°03′N 34°50′E
- Country: Turkey
- Province: Mersin
- District: Tarsus
- Elevation: 200 m (660 ft)
- Population (2022): 187
- Time zone: UTC+3 (TRT)
- Area code: 0324

Çevreli is a neighbourhood in the municipality and district of Tarsus, Mersin Province, Turkey. Its population is 187 (2022). It is situated in Çukurova (Cilicia of antiquity) to the north of Berdan River and Berdan Dam reservoir. The distance to Tarsus is 20 kilometres (12 mi) and the distance to Mersin is 55 kilometres (34 mi). The main agricultural product of the village is grape.
