= Çavdarlı, Tarsus =

Çavdarlı
- Neighbourhood
- Location in Turkey
- Coordinates: 37°02′N 34°47′E
- Country: Turkey
- Province: Mersin
- District: Tarsus
- Elevation: 375 m (1,230 ft)
- Population (2022): 280
- Time zone: UTC+3 (TRT)
- Area code: 0324

Çavdarlı (formerly Kıristan) is a neighbourhood in the municipality and district of Tarsus, Mersin Province, Turkey. Its population was 280 in 2022.

It is located in the southern slopes of the Taurus Mountains and to the north of Tarsus. It is situated to the northwest of the Berdan Dam reservoir and to the south of Keşbükü creek a branch of Berdan River. Its distance to Tarsus is 28 kilometres (17 mi) and its distance to Mersin is 55 kilometres (34 mi). The population is decreasing because of migration to cities. The major economic activity of the village is fruit farming. Grape and olive are the main crops. Beehiving and poultry husbandry are secondary activities.
