= Egemen, Tarsus =

Egemen
- Neighbourhood
- Location in Turkey
- Coordinates: 36°48′N 34°57′E
- Country: Turkey
- Province: Mersin
- District: Tarsus
- Elevation: 5 m (16 ft)
- Population (2022): 550
- Time zone: UTC+3 (TRT)
- Area code: 0324

Egemen (formerly: Çayboyu) is a neighbourhood in the municipality and district of Tarsus, Mersin Province, Turkey. Its population is 550 (2022). It is situated in Çukurova (Cilicia of the antiquity). The Mediterranean Sea coast is 6 kilometres (3.7 mi) to the south of Egemen and Berdan River is 5 kilometres (3.1 mi) to the east. The distance to Tarsus is 23 kilometres (14 mi) and the distance to Mersin is 45 kilometres (28 mi). Situated in the fertile plains, farming is the major economic activity. Cotton and green house vegetables are the main crops. The village suffers from frequent floods from the Berdan River.
