= Halitağa, Tarsus =

Halitağa
- Neighbourhood
- Location in Turkey
- Coordinates: 36°53′N 34°56′E
- Country: Turkey
- Province: Mersin
- District: Tarsus
- Elevation: 10 m (33 ft)
- Population (2022): 211
- Time zone: UTC+3 (TRT)
- Area code: 0324

Halitağa is a neighbourhood in the municipality and district of Tarsus, Mersin Province, Turkey. Its population is 211 (2022). It is situated in Çukurova (Cilicia of the antiquity) to the southeast of Tarsus and east of Karabucak Forest. Its distance to Tarsus is 10 kilometres (6.2 mi) and its distance to Mersin is 36 kilometres (22 mi).
