= Ağzıdelik, Tarsus =

Ağzıdelik
- Neighbourhood
- Location in Turkey
- Coordinates: 36°47′N 34°59′E
- Country: Turkey
- Province: Mersin
- District: Tarsus
- Elevation: 2 m (6.6 ft)
- Population (2022): 239
- Time zone: UTC+3 (TRT)
- Area code: 0324

Ağzıdelik is a neighbourhood in the municipality and district of Tarsus, Mersin Province, Turkey. Its population is 239 (2022). It is situated in Çukurova (Cilicia of the antiquity) plains to the west of Berdan River. The distance to Tarsus is 22 kilometres (14 mi) and the distance to Mersin is 45 kilometres (28 mi).
