= Reşadiye (disambiguation) =

Reşadiye is the honorific title given after Mehmed V (1844 – 1918), who reigned as the 35th and penultimate sultan of the Ottoman Empire between 1909 and 1918.

Reşadiye may also refer to:

== Places in Turkey ==
- Reşadiye, Turkey
- Reşadiye, Çivril, Denizli Province
- Reşadiye, Ortaköy, Aksaray Province
- Reşadiye, Sandıklı, Afyonkarahisar Province
- Reşadiye, Tarsus, Mersin Province
- Reşadiye, Yenişehir, Bursa Province
- Reşadiye, Yenice, Çanakkale Province
- Reşadiye, an area of Datça in Muğla Province
- Reşadiye, an Ottoman name for Igoumenitsa

== Other uses ==
- Reşadiye Peninsula, in south west Turkey
- Reşadiye-class battleship
  - Ottoman battleship Reşadiye
