= Yunusoğlu =

Yunusoğlu (literally "son of Yunus" in Turkish) may refer to:

- Yunusoğlu, Tarsus, a village in the district of Tarsus, Mersin Province, Turkey
- Yunusoğlu, Yüreğir, a village in the district of Yüreğir, Adana Province, Turkey
