= Karaçerçili, Tarsus =

Karaçerçili
- Neighbourhood
- Location in Turkey
- Coordinates: 36°51′N 35°07′E
- Country: Turkey
- Province: Mersin
- District: Tarsus
- Elevation: 5 m (16 ft)
- Population (2022): 290
- Time zone: UTC+3 (TRT)
- Area code: 0324

Karaçerçili (literally Black-peddler) is a neighbourhood in the municipality and district of Tarsus, Mersin Province, Turkey. Its population is 290 (2022). It is situated in Çukurova (Cilicia of the antiquity) to the southeast of Tarsus and to the west of Berdan River. Its distance to Tarsus is about 30 kilometres (19 mi) and 60 kilometres (37 mi) to Mersin. The main economic activity is agriculture and the main crop is cotton.
