= Çatalca, Tarsus =

Çatalca
- Neighbourhood
- Location in Turkey
- Coordinates: 36°48′N 35°01′E
- Country: Turkey
- Province: Mersin
- District: Tarsus
- Elevation: 0 m (0 ft)
- Population (2022): 66
- Time zone: UTC+3 (TRT)
- Area code: 0324

Çatalca is a neighbourhood in the municipality and district of Tarsus, Mersin Province, Turkey. Its population is 66 (2022). It is situated in Çukurova (Cilicia of antiquity) to the south of Tarsus and to the west of the Berdan River. Its distance to Tarsus is 20 kilometres (12 mi) and its distance to Mersin is 47 kilometres (29 mi). Although situated in a fertile valley, the village suffers from frequent floods.
