= Kaleburcu =

- Neighbourhood
- Location in Turkey
- Coordinates: 36°56′N 34°50′E
- Country: Turkey
- Province: Mersin
- District: Tarsus
- Elevation: 140 m (460 ft)
- Population (2022): 1,102
- Time zone: UTC+3 (TRT)
- Area code: 0324

Kaleburcu is a neighbourhood in the municipality and district of Tarsus, Mersin Province, Turkey. Its population is 1,102 (2022). It is situated in the Çukurova plains to the south of Çukurova Motorway and to the north of Turkish state highway D.400. It is almost merged to Tarsus. Its distance to Mersin is 30 kilometres (19 mi).
