= Dadalı, Tarsus =

Dadalı
- Neighbourhood
- Location in Turkey
- Coordinates: 36°58′N 34°54′E
- Country: Turkey
- Province: Mersin
- District: Tarsus
- Elevation: 105 m (344 ft)
- Population (2022): 213
- Time zone: UTC+3 (TRT)
- Area code: 0324

Dadalı is a neighbourhood in the municipality and district of Tarsus, Mersin Province, Turkey. Its population is 213 (2022). It is situated in the Çukurova plains between the Çukurova motorway and Berdan Dam. Its distance to Tarsus is 7 kilometres (4.3 mi) and its distance to Mersin is 35 kilometres (22 mi). It sits at 215 feet above sea level.
