= Avadan =

- Neighbourhood
- Location in Turkey
- Coordinates: 37°02′13″N 35°05′56″E
- Country: Turkey
- Province: Mersin
- District: Tarsus
- Elevation: 135 m (443 ft)
- Population (2022): 246
- Time zone: UTC+3 (TRT)
- Area code: 0324

Avadan is a neighbourhood in the municipality and district of Tarsus, Mersin Province, Turkey. Its population is 246 (2022). It is situated in Çukurova (Cilicia of the antiquity) plains to the north of Çukurova motorway. The distance to Tarsus is 28 kilometres (17 mi) and the distance to Mersin is 50 kilometres (31 mi). According to village's website, the village was founded in the early years of the 19th century. The main economic activity in the village is farming. Fruits like citrus, grapes, apricots etc. are the main crops.
