= Kösebalcı =

- Neighbourhood
- Location in Turkey
- Coordinates: 37°00′N 34°52′E
- Country: Turkey
- Province: Mersin
- District: Tarsus
- Elevation: 160 m (520 ft)
- Population (2022): 218
- Time zone: UTC+3 (TRT)
- Area code: 0324

Kösebalcı is a neighbourhood in the municipality and district of Tarsus, Mersin Province, Turkey. Its population is 218 (2022). It is situated in the Çukurova plains to the west of Berdan Dam reservoir. Its distance to Tarsus is 12 kilometres (7.5 mi) and its distance to Mersin is 40 kilometres (25 mi).
