= Akçakocalı, Tarsus =

Akçakocalı
- Neighbourhood
- Location in Turkey
- Coordinates: 36°58′N 34°52′E
- Country: Turkey
- Province: Mersin
- District: Tarsus
- Elevation: 70 m (230 ft)
- Population (2022): 150
- Time zone: UTC+3 (TRT)
- Area code: 0324

Akçakocalı is a neighbourhood in the municipality and district of Tarsus, Mersin Province, Turkey. Its population is 150 (2022). It is situated in Çukurova (Cilicia of the antiquity) plains at the north bank of Berdan Dam reservoir. The distance to Tarsus is 8 kilometres (5.0 mi) and the distance to Mersin is 33 kilometres (21 mi).
