= List of alluvial plains of Turkey =

Turkey is a peninsular country. At the north and south of the peninsulas the mountain ranges run parallel to sea. There are many short rivers flowing from the mountainous highlands to surrounding seas. Alluvial plains are situated at the mouth of the rivers . But most of the plains are small. Below is the list of some of the more important alluvial plains. The order in the table is counter clockwise from the north.

Alluvial plain	River(s)	Sea	Province(s)
Çarşamba	Yeşilırmak	Black Sea	Samsun
Bafra	Kızılırmak	Black sea	Samsun
Sakarya	Sakarya	Black Sea	Sakarya
Meriç	Meriç	Aegean Sea	Edirne
Menemen	Gediz	Aegean sea	İzmir
Küçükmenderes	Küçükmenderes	Aegean Sea	İzmir
Balat	Büyükmenderes	Aegean Sea	Aydın
Dalaman	Dalaman	Mediterranean Sea	Muğla
Eşen	Eşen	Mediterranean Sea	Muğla-Antalya
Antalya	Manavgat-Aksu	Mediterranean Sea	Antalya
Silifke	Göksu	Mediterranean Sea	Mersin
Çukurova	Seyhan, Ceyhan, Berdan	Mediterranean Sea	Mersin- Adana
