= Sarıveli, Tarsus =

Sarıveli
- Neighbourhood
- Location in Turkey
- Coordinates: 36°56′N 34°43′E
- Country: Turkey
- Province: Mersin
- District: Tarsus
- Elevation: 130 m (430 ft)
- Population (2022): 340
- Time zone: UTC+3 (TRT)
- Area code: 0324

Sarıveli is a neighbourhood in the municipality and district of Tarsus, Mersin Province, Turkey. Its population is 340 (2022). It is situated in Çukurova (Cilicia of the antiquity). Çukurova Motorway (O.51) is to the north of the village and Turkish state highway D.400 is to the south of the village. The distance to Tarsus is 20 kilometres (12 mi) and 45 kilometres (28 mi) to Mersin.
