= İncirlikuyu =

- Neighbourhood
- Location in Turkey
- Coordinates: 36°57′N 34°52′E
- Country: Turkey
- Province: Mersin
- District: Tarsus
- Elevation: 30 m (100 ft)
- Population (2022): 578
- Time zone: UTC+3 (TRT)
- Area code: 0324

İncirlikuyu is a neighbourhood in the municipality and district of Tarsus, Mersin Province, Turkey. Its population is 578 (2022). It is situated in Çukurova (Cilicia of the antiquity), to the south of Berdan Dam and to the north of Tarsus. Its distance to Tarsus is 5 kilometres (3.1 mi) and its distance to Mersin is 32 kilometres (20 mi). The villages main economic activity is farming, especially grape production.
