= Sucular, Tarsus =

Sucular
- Neighbourhood
- Location in Turkey
- Coordinates: 36°58′N 34°49′E
- Country: Turkey
- Province: Mersin
- District: Tarsus
- Elevation: 200 m (660 ft)
- Population (2022): 272
- Time zone: UTC+3 (TRT)
- Area code: 0324

Sucular is a neighbourhood in the municipality and district of Tarsus, Mersin Province, Turkey. Its population is 272 (2022). It is situated in Çukurova (Cilicia of the antiquity). Berdan Dam reservoir is to the east and the Turkish state highway D.400 is to the south of the village. The distance to Tarsus is 10 kilometres (6.2 mi) and to Mersin is 35 kilometres (22 mi). The major crop of the village is grape.
