= Akarsu, Tarsus =

Akarsu
- Neighbourhood
- Location in Turkey
- Coordinates: 36°51′N 34°58′E
- Country: Turkey
- Province: Mersin
- District: Tarsus
- Elevation: 5 m (16 ft)
- Population (2022): 387
- Time zone: UTC+3 (TRT)
- Area code: 0324

Akarsu is a neighbourhood in the municipality and district of Tarsus, Mersin Province, Turkey. Its population is 387 (2022). It is situated in Çukurova (Cilicia of the antiquity) plains at the east bank of Berdan River. The distance to Tarsus is 13 kilometres (8.1 mi) and the distance to Mersin is 38 kilometres (24 mi).
