= Tepeçaylak =

- Neighbourhood
- Location in Turkey
- Coordinates: 37°03′N 35°03′E
- Country: Turkey
- Province: Mersin
- District: Tarsus
- Elevation: 160 m (520 ft)
- Population (2022): 196
- Time zone: UTC+3 (TRT)
- Area code: 0324

Tepeçaylak is a neighbourhood in the municipality and district of Tarsus, Mersin Province, Turkey. Its population is 196 (2022). It is situated in Çukurova (Cilicia of the antiquity) to the north of Çukurova motorway. The distance to Tarsus is 25 kilometres (16 mi) and the distance to Mersin is 50 kilometres (31 mi). The main crop of the village is grape.
