= Atalar, Tarsus =

Atalar
- Neighbourhood
- Location in Turkey
- Coordinates: 36°51′N 34°51′E
- Country: Turkey
- Province: Mersin
- District: Tarsus
- Elevation: 5 m (16 ft)
- Population (2022): 1,599
- Time zone: UTC+3 (TRT)
- Postal code: 33401
- Area code: 0324

Atalar (former Deliminnet) is a neighbourhood in the municipality and district of Tarsus, Mersin Province, Turkey. Its population is 1,599 (2022). Before the 2013 reorganisation, it was a town (belde).

It is situated in Çukurova plains. It is located 3 kilometres (1.9 mi) west of Yeşiltepe (another town). Its distance to Tarsus is 14 kilometres (8.7 mi) and its distance to Mersin is 24 kilometres (15 mi).
