= Aladağ, Tarsus =

Aladağ
- Neighbourhood
- Location in Turkey
- Coordinates: 37°05′N 34°58′E
- Country: Turkey
- Province: Mersin
- District: Tarsus
- Elevation: 235 m (771 ft)
- Population (2022): 207
- Time zone: UTC+3 (TRT)
- Area code: 0324

Aladağ is a neighbourhood in the municipality and district of Tarsus, Mersin Province, Turkey. Its population is 207 (2022). It is situated in Çukurova (Cilicia of the antiquity) plains to the east of the Turkish state highway D.750. The distance to Tarsus is 20 kilometres (12 mi) and the distance to Mersin is 48 kilometres (30 mi).
