= Esenler, Tarsus =

Esenler
- Neighbourhood
- Location in Turkey
- Coordinates: 36°57′36″N 35°01′37″E
- Country: Turkey
- Province: Mersin
- District: Tarsus
- Elevation: 25 m (82 ft)
- Population (2022): 482
- Time zone: UTC+3 (TRT)
- Area code: 0324

Esenler is a neighbourhood in the municipality and district of Tarsus, Mersin Province, Turkey. Its population is 482 (2022). It is situated in the Çukurova (Cilicia of the antiquity) plains to the south of Turkish state highway D.400. It is almost merged to Yenice. The distance to Tarsus is 14 kilometres (8.7 mi) and the distance to Mersin is 42 kilometres (26 mi).
