= Kulak, Tarsus =

Kulak
- Neighbourhood
- Location in Turkey
- Coordinates: 36°48′N 34°52′E
- Country: Turkey
- Province: Mersin
- District: Tarsus
- Elevation: 5 m (16 ft)
- Population (2022): 987
- Time zone: UTC+3 (TRT)
- Area code: 0324

Kulak is a neighbourhood in the Tarsus district of Mersin Province, Turkey. Its population is 987 (2022). It is in Çukurova (Cilicia of the antiquity) and to the south of Tarsus. It is situated to the north of the coast of the Mediterranean Sea and west of Berdan River. Its distance to Tarsus is 17 kilometres (11 mi) and its distance to Mersin is 40 kilometres (25 mi). Situated in the fertile plains, farming is the major economic activity. Cotton and green house vegetables are the main crops.

The frequent floods of Berdan River have reduced the agricultural income of the villagers. However, the State Hydraulic Works of Turkey has begun a project to control the river.
