= Çöplü, Tarsus =

Çöplü
- Neighbourhood
- Location in Turkey
- Coordinates: 36°48′N 35°06′E
- Country: Turkey
- Province: Mersin
- District: Tarsus
- Elevation: 5 m (16 ft)
- Population (2022): 300
- Time zone: UTC+3 (TRT)
- Area code: 0324

Çöplü is a neighbourhood in the municipality and district of Tarsus, Mersin Province, Turkey. Its population is 300 (2022). It is located in the Çukurova plains (Cilicia of antiquity) to the north of Berdan River. Its distance to Tarsus is 33 kilometres (21 mi) and its distance to Mersin is 63 kilometres (39 mi). The main economic activity is farming. Various vegetables and fruits especially cotton are the most common crops.
