= Yaramış, Tarsus =

Yaramış
- Neighbourhood
- Location in Turkey
- Coordinates: 36°49′N 35°03′E
- Country: Turkey
- Province: Mersin
- District: Tarsus
- Elevation: 5 m (16 ft)
- Population (2022): 200
- Time zone: UTC+3 (TRT)
- Area code: 0324

Yaramış is a neighbourhood in the municipality and district of Tarsus, Mersin Province, Turkey. Its population is 200 (2022). It is situated in Çukurova (Cilicia of the antiquity) to the southeast of Tarsus and to the west of Berdan River. Its distance to Tarsus is about 25 kilometres (16 mi) and its distance to Mersin is 55 kilometres (34 mi).
