= Yeniçay, Tarsus =

Yeniçay
- Neighbourhood
- Location in Turkey
- Coordinates: 36°51′N 34°57′E
- Country: Turkey
- Province: Mersin
- District: Tarsus
- Elevation: 5 m (16 ft)
- Population (2022): 117
- Time zone: UTC+3 (TRT)
- Area code: 0324

Yeniçay is a neighbourhood in the municipality and district of Tarsus, Mersin Province, Turkey. Its population is 117 (2022). It is situated in Çukurova (Cilicia of the antiquity) to the south of Tarsus on the west bank of Berdan River. Its distance to Tarsus is 7 kilometres (4.3 mi) and its distance to Mersin is 33 kilometres (21 mi).
