= Yüksek, Tarsus =

Yüksek
- Neighbourhood
- Location in Turkey
- Coordinates: 36°56′N 35°03′E
- Country: Turkey
- Province: Mersin
- District: Tarsus
- Elevation: 15 m (49 ft)
- Population (2022): 199
- Time zone: UTC+3 (TRT)
- Area code: 0324

Yüksek (or Yüksekköy) is a neighbourhood in the municipality and district of Tarsus, Mersin Province, Turkey. Its population is 199 (2022). It is situated in Çukurova (Cilicia of the antiquity) to the east of Tarsus and to the south of Yenice, Tarsus. Its distance to Tarsus is 19 kilometres (12 mi) and its distance to Mersin is 47 kilometres (29 mi).
