= Kelahmet, Tarsus =

Kelahmet
- Neighbourhood
- Location within Turkey
- Coordinates: 36°49′N 34°59′E
- Country: Turkey
- Province: Mersin
- District: Tarsus
- Elevation: 5 m (16 ft)
- Population (2022): 557
- Time zone: UTC+3 (TRT)
- Area code: 0324

Kelahmet is a neighbourhood in the municipality and district of Tarsus, Mersin Province, Turkey. Its population is 557 (2022). It is located in Çukurova (Cilicia of the antiquity) to the south of Tarsus. It is situated to the north of the coast of the Mediterranean Sea and to the west of the Berdan River. Its distance to Tarsus is 15 kilometres (9.3 mi) and its distance to Mersin is 40 kilometres (25 mi). Situated in fertile plains, farming is the major economic activity with cotton and greenhouse vegetables being popular crops.
