= Arıklı, Tarsus =

Arıklı
- Neighbourhood
- Location in Turkey
- Coordinates: 36°59′N 35°05′E
- Country: Turkey
- Province: Mersin
- District: Tarsus
- Elevation: 30 m (98 ft)
- Population (2022): 175
- Time zone: UTC+3 (TRT)
- Area code: 0324

Arıklı is a neighbourhood in the municipality and district of Tarsus, Mersin Province, Turkey. Its population is 175 (2022). It is situated in the Çukurova (Cilicia) plains. It is on the state highway D.400, east of Mersin, Tarsus and Yenice. It is the easternmost village of the province. The distance to Tarsus is 19 kilometres (12 mi) and the distance to Mersin is 46 kilometres (29 mi).
