= Camilimanda =

- Neighbourhood
- Location in Turkey
- Coordinates: 37°00′N 35°00′E
- Country: Turkey
- Province: Mersin
- District: Tarsus
- Elevation: 65 m (213 ft)
- Population (2022): 290
- Time zone: UTC+3 (TRT)
- Area code: 0324

Camilimanda is a neighbourhood in the municipality and district of Tarsus, Mersin Province, Turkey. Its population is 290 (2022). It is situated in the Çukurova (Cilicia of the antiquity) plains between Çukurova motorway and state road D.400. The distance to Tarsus is 13 kilometres (8.1 mi) and the distance to Mersin is 43 kilometres (27 mi).
