= Günyurdu =

Settlement in Turkey

- Neighbourhood
- Location in Turkey
- Coordinates: 37°00′N 35°06′E
- Country: Turkey
- Province: Mersin
- District: Tarsus
- Elevation: 40 m (130 ft)
- Population (2022): 2,416
- Time zone: UTC+3 (TRT)
- Area code: 0324

Günyurdu is a neighbourhood in the municipality and district of Tarsus, Mersin Province, Turkey. Its population is 2,416 (2022). It is situated in Çukurova (Cilicia of the antiquity) plains between Çukurova motorway and state road D.400. It is one of the easternmost villages of the province. The distance to Tarsus is 20 kilometres (12 mi) and the distance to Mersin is 50 kilometres (31 mi).
