= Sayköy, Tarsus =

Sayköy
- Neighbourhood
- Location in Turkey
- Coordinates: 36°56′N 34°47′E
- Country: Turkey
- Province: Mersin
- District: Tarsus
- Elevation: 120 m (390 ft)
- Population (2022): 421
- Time zone: UTC+3 (TRT)
- Area code: 0324

Sayköy is a neighbourhood in the municipality and district of Tarsus, Mersin Province, Turkey. Its population is 421 (2022). It is situated in Çukurova (Cilicia of the antiquity). Çukurova Motorway (O.51) is to the north and Turkish state highway D.400 is to the south of the village. The distance to Tarsus is 12 kilometres (7.5 mi) and to Mersin is 30 kilometres (19 mi). It is a typical Çukurova village, cotton and fresh vegetables being the main crops.
