= Çamtepe, Tarsus =

Çamtepe
- Neighbourhood
- Location in Turkey
- Coordinates: 36°59′N 34°56′E
- Country: Turkey
- Province: Mersin
- District: Tarsus
- Elevation: 80 m (260 ft)
- Population (2022): 251
- Time zone: UTC+3 (TRT)
- Area code: 0324

Çamtepe is a neighbourhood in the municipality and district of Tarsus, Mersin Province, Turkey. Its population is 251 (2022). It is situated in Çukurova (Cilicia of the antiquity) to the northeast of Tarsus and between the Turkish motorway O.31 and the Turkish state highway D.750. Its distance to Tarsus is 9 kilometres (5.6 mi) and its distance to Mersin is 38 kilometres (24 mi).
