= Takbaş =

- Neighbourhood
- Location in Turkey
- Coordinates: 36°56′46″N 34°50′10″E
- Country: Turkey
- Province: Mersin
- District: Tarsus
- Elevation: 150 m (490 ft)
- Population (2022): 828
- Time zone: UTC+3 (TRT)
- Area code: 0324

Takbaş is a neighbourhood in the municipality and district of Tarsus, Mersin Province, Turkey. Its population is 828 (2022). It is situated in Çukurova (Cilicia of antiquity). Çukurova Motorway (O.51) is to the north and Turkish state highway D.400 is to the south of the village. The distance to Tarsus is 4 kilometres (2.5 mi) and to Mersin is 35 kilometres (22 mi). It is a typical Çukurova village, cotton and fresh vegetables being the main crops.
