= Böğrüeğri, Tarsus =

Böğrüeğri
- Neighbourhood
- Location in Turkey
- Coordinates: 37°04′N 34°56′E
- Country: Turkey
- Province: Mersin
- District: Tarsus
- Elevation: 1,040 m (3,410 ft)
- Population (2022): 438
- Time zone: UTC+3 (TRT)
- Area code: 0324

Böğrüeğri is a neighbourhood in the municipality and district of Tarsus, Mersin Province, Turkey. Its population is 438 (2022). It is situated in the Taurus Mountains (Cilicia of the antiquity) plains at the north bank of Berdan Dam reservoir. The distance to Tarsus is 46 kilometres (29 mi) and the distance to Mersin is 78 kilometres (48 mi).
