= Kayadibi, Tarsus =

Kayadibi
- Neighbourhood
- Location in Turkey
- Coordinates: 37°01′N 34°54′E
- Country: Turkey
- Province: Mersin
- District: Tarsus
- Elevation: 125 m (410 ft)
- Population (2022): 285
- Time zone: UTC+3 (TRT)
- Area code: 0324

Kayadibi is a neighbourhood in the municipality and district of Tarsus, Mersin Province, Turkey. Its population is 285 (2022). It is situated in the peneplane area to the south of Toros Mountains. Berdan Dam reservoir is to the west of the village. It is located 10 kilometres (6.2 mi) away from Taurus and 38 kilometres (24 mi) away from Mersin. The villages' main economic activity is farming. Grapes and various vegetables are produced.
