= Yunusoğlu, Tarsus =

Yunusoğlu
- Neighbourhood
- Location in Turkey
- Coordinates: 36°57′N 34°59′E
- Country: Turkey
- Province: Mersin
- District: Tarsus
- Elevation: 20 m (66 ft)
- Population (2022): 506
- Time zone: UTC+3 (TRT)
- Area code: 0324

Yunusoğlu is a neighbourhood in the municipality and district of Tarsus, Mersin Province, Turkey. Its population is 506 (2022). It is situated in Çukurova (Cilicia of the antiquity) to the east of Tarsus between Turkish motorway O.31 and Turkish state highway D.750. It also functions as a railroad stop. Its distance to Tarsus is 7 kilometres (4.3 mi) and its distance to Mersin is 33 kilometres (21 mi).
