= Meşelik, Tarsus =

Meşelik
- Neighbourhood
- Location in Turkey
- Coordinates: 37°04′N 34°47′E
- Country: Turkey
- Province: Mersin
- District: Tarsus
- Elevation: 375 m (1,230 ft)
- Population (2022): 349
- Time zone: UTC+3 (TRT)
- Area code: 0324

Meşelik is a neighbourhood in the municipality and district of Tarsus, Mersin Province, Turkey. Its population is 349 (2022). It is situated in the southern slopes of the Toros Mountains and to the west of Berdan River. Its distance to Tarsus is 25 kilometres (16 mi) and its distance to Mersin is 50 kilometres (31 mi).
