= Kerimler, Tarsus =

Kerimler
- Neighbourhood
- Location in Turkey
- Coordinates: 36°56′N 34°46′E
- Country: Turkey
- Province: Mersin
- District: Tarsus
- Elevation: 160 m (520 ft)
- Population (2022): 183
- Time zone: UTC+3 (TRT)
- Area code: 0324

Kerimler is a neighbourhood in the municipality and district of Tarsus, Mersin Province, Turkey. Its population is 183 (2022). It lies between Turkish state highway D.400 and Motorway O.51 both going from west to east in Çukurova (Cilicia of the antiquity). Its distance to Tarsus is 15 kilometres (9.3 mi) and its distance to Mersin is 27 kilometres (17 mi). The main economic activity is farming. Various vegetables and fruits are farmed with grapes being the most dominant crop.
