= Köselerli, Tarsus =

Köselerli
- Neighbourhood
- Location in Turkey
- Coordinates: 36°50′N 34°52′E
- Country: Turkey
- Province: Mersin
- District: Tarsus
- Elevation: 3 m (10 ft)
- Population (2022): 264
- Time zone: UTC+3 (TRT)
- Area code: 0324

Köselerli is a neighbourhood in the municipality and district of Tarsus, Mersin Province, Turkey. Its population is 264 (2022). It is situated in the Çukurova plains. Its distance to Tarsus is 12 kilometres (7.5 mi) and its distance to Mersin is 20 kilometres (12 mi). Cotton, fruits and especially grapes are the most commonly produced crops of the village. A big tourism complex on the Mediterranean Sea shore is under construction (see Tourism centers of Mersin Province). When finished, it may be another source of revenue for the village.
