= Alifakı =

- Neighbourhood
- Location in Turkey
- Coordinates: 36°53′N 35°00′E
- Country: Turkey
- Province: Mersin
- District: Tarsus
- Elevation: 10 m (33 ft)
- Population (2022): 6,551
- Time zone: UTC+3 (TRT)
- Area code: 0324

Alifakı is a neighbourhood in the municipality and district of Tarsus, Mersin Province, Turkey. Its population is 6,551 (2022). It is situated in Çukurova (Cilicia of the antiquity) plains to the southeast of Tarsus. The distance to Tarsus is 13 kilometres (8.1 mi) and the distance to Mersin is 38 kilometres (24 mi).
