= Yanıkkışla, Tarsus =

Yanıkkışla
- Neighbourhood
- Location in Turkey
- Coordinates: 37°09′N 34°53′E
- Country: Turkey
- Province: Mersin
- District: Tarsus
- Elevation: 515 m (1,690 ft)
- Population (2022): 377
- Time zone: UTC+3 (TRT)
- Area code: 0324

Yanıkkışla is a neighbourhood in the municipality and district of Tarsus, Mersin Province, Turkey. Its population is 377 (2022). It is situated to the east of Turkish state highway D.750. Its distance to Tarsus is 33 kilometres (21 mi) and its distance to Mersin is 60 kilometres (37 mi).
