= Ardıçlı, Tarsus =

Ardıçlı
- Neighbourhood
- Location in Turkey
- Coordinates: 37°14′N 34°45′E
- Country: Turkey
- Province: Mersin
- District: Tarsus
- Elevation: 1,080 m (3,540 ft)
- Population (2022): 428
- Time zone: UTC+3 (TRT)
- Area code: 0324

Ardıçlı is a neighbourhood in the municipality and district of Tarsus, Mersin Province, Turkey. Its population is 428 (2022). It is situated in the Taurus Mountains to the west of the Turkish state highway D.750. The distance to Tarsus is 48 kilometres (30 mi) and the distance to Mersin is 78 kilometres (48 mi).
