= Kanberhüyüğü =

- Neighbourhood
- Location in Turkey
- Coordinates: 36°58′06″N 35°01′31″E
- Country: Turkey
- Province: Mersin
- District: Tarsus
- Elevation: 30 m (98 ft)
- Population (2022): 578
- Time zone: UTC+3 (TRT)
- Area code: 0324

Kanberhüyüğü is a neighbourhood in the municipality and district of Tarsus, Mersin Province, Turkey. Its population is 578 (2022). It is situated in Çukurova (Cilicia of the antiquity) to the east of Tarsus and to the north of Turkish state highway D.400. It also functions as a railroad stop. Its distance to Tarsus is 12 kilometres (7.5 mi) and its distance to Mersin is 35 kilometres (22 mi). Kanberhüyüğü is known as the location of the clash during the War of Turkish Independence on 27 July 1920 in which French forces defeated local militia.
