= Verimli, Tarsus =

Verimli
- Neighbourhood
- Location in Turkey
- Coordinates: 36°54′N 35°07′E
- Country: Turkey
- Province: Mersin
- District: Tarsus
- Elevation: 10 m (33 ft)
- Population (2022): 116
- Time zone: UTC+3 (TRT)
- Area code: 0324

Verimli is a neighbourhood in the municipality and district of Tarsus, Mersin Province, Turkey. Its population is 116 (2022). It is situated in Çukurova (Cilicia of antiquity). It is one of the easternmost villages of Mersin Province. Its distance to Tarsus is 28 kilometres (17 mi) and its distance to Mersin is 55 kilometres (34 mi). When completed, Çukurova Airport will be to the west of the village.
