= Karadiken, Tarsus =

Karadiken
- Neighbourhood
- Location in Turkey
- Coordinates: 37°00′N 34°43′E
- Country: Turkey
- Province: Mersin
- District: Tarsus
- Elevation: 300 m (980 ft)
- Population (2022): 559
- Time zone: UTC+3 (TRT)
- Area code: 0324

Karadiken is a neighbourhood in the municipality and district of Tarsus, Mersin Province, Turkey. Its population is 559 (2022). It is situated on the southern slopes of the Taurus Mountains. The distance to Tarsus is 25 kilometres (16 mi) and 52 kilometres (32 mi) to Mersin. It is a typical Çukurova village. Cotton, grapes and fresh vegetables are the main crops.
