= Kocaköy, Tarsus =

Kocaköy
- Neighbourhood
- Location in Turkey
- Coordinates: 36°55′N 35°02′E
- Country: Turkey
- Province: Mersin
- District: Tarsus
- Elevation: 10 m (33 ft)
- Population (2022): 57
- Time zone: UTC+3 (TRT)
- Area code: 0324

Kocaköy is a neighbourhood in the municipality and district of Tarsus, Mersin Province, Turkey. Its population is 57 (2022). It is situated in the Çukurova plains. Its distance to Tarsus is 12 kilometres (7.5 mi) and to Mersin is 40 kilometres (25 mi). Although its name means "big village" it is one of the least populous settlements in Tarsus district.
