= Nemiroğlu, Tarsus =

Nemiroğlu
- Neighbourhood
- Location in Turkey
- Coordinates: 36°55′N 35°01′E
- Country: Turkey
- Province: Mersin
- District: Tarsus
- Elevation: 10 m (30 ft)
- Population (2022): 109
- Time zone: UTC+3 (TRT)
- Area code: 0324

Nemiroğlu is a neighbourhood in the municipality and district of Tarsus, Mersin Province, Turkey. Its population is 109 (2022). It is situated in Çukurova (Cilicia of the antiquity) to the east of Tarsus and to the south of the Turkish state highway D.400. Its distance to Tarsus is 15 kilometres (9.3 mi) and its distance to Mersin is 40 kilometres (25 mi). Its main economic activity is agriculture with grapes being the village's major crop.
