= Simithacılı =

- Neighbourhood
- Location in Turkey
- Coordinates: 36°53′N 35°07′E
- Country: Turkey
- Province: Mersin
- District: Tarsus
- Elevation: 10 m (33 ft)
- Population (2022): 86
- Time zone: UTC+3 (TRT)
- Area code: 0324

Simithacılı is a neighbourhood in the Tarsus district of Mersin Province, Turkey. Its population is 86 (2022). It is situated in the Çukurova (Cilicia of antiquity) plains. The Turkish state highway D.400 runs some 13 kilometres (8 mi) to the north of the village, and the Çukurova Airport is under construction to the west of the village. The distance to Tarsus is 25 kilometres (16 mi) and the distance to Mersin is 58 kilometres (36 mi). The major crop grown in the village is cotton.
