= Baltalı, Tarsus =

Baltalı
- Neighbourhood
- Location in Turkey
- Coordinates: 36°57′N 35°05′E
- Country: Turkey
- Province: Mersin
- District: Tarsus
- Elevation: 20 m (66 ft)
- Population (2022): 375
- Time zone: UTC+3 (TRT)
- Area code: 0324

Baltalı is a neighbourhood in the municipality and district of Tarsus, Mersin Province, Turkey. Its population is 375 (2022). It is situated in the Çukurova (Cilicia of the antiquity) plain to the south of the Turkish state highway D.400. The distance to Tarsus is 16 kilometres (9.9 mi) and the distance to Mersin is 43 kilometres (27 mi).
