= Yazlık, Tarsus =

Yazlık
- Neighbourhood
- Location in Turkey
- Coordinates: 37°06′N 34°53′E
- Country: Turkey
- Province: Mersin
- District: Tarsus
- Elevation: 380 m (1,250 ft)
- Population (2022): 66
- Time zone: UTC+3 (TRT)
- Area code: 0324

Yazlık is a neighbourhood in the municipality and district of Tarsus, Mersin Province, Turkey. Its population is 66 (2022). It is situated in the southern slopes of the Taurus Mountains to the west of Turkish state highway D.750. Its distance to Tarsus is about 20 kilometres (12 mi) and it distance to Mersin is 50 kilometres (31 mi).
