= Muratlı, Tarsus =

Muratlı
- Neighbourhood
- Location in Turkey
- Coordinates: 37°02′N 34°59′E
- Country: Turkey
- Province: Mersin
- District: Tarsus
- Elevation: 130 m (430 ft)
- Population (2022): 109
- Time zone: UTC+3 (TRT)
- Area code: 0324

Muratlı is a neighbourhood in the municipality and district of Tarsus, Mersin Province, Turkey. Its population is 109 (2022). It is situated in Çukurova (Cilicia of the antiquity) to the northeast of Tarsus and the junction of the motorways O.21 and O.52, and is slightly elevated with respect to the plains. It lies 16 kilometres (9.9 mi) away from Tarsus and 41 kilometres (25 mi) away from Mersin. Its main economic activity is agriculture with grapes being its principal crop.
