= Çokak, Tarsus =

Çokak
- Neighbourhood
- Location in Turkey
- Coordinates: 37°10′N 34°54′E
- Country: Turkey
- Province: Mersin
- District: Tarsus
- Elevation: 550 m (1,800 ft)
- Population (2022): 233
- Time zone: UTC+3 (TRT)
- Area code: 0324

Çokak is a neighbourhood in the municipality and district of Tarsus, Mersin Province, Turkey. Its population is 233 (2022). It is situated in the southern slopes of the Taurus Mountains to the east of Turkish state highway D.750. The distance to Tarsus is 36 kilometres (22 mi) and the distance to Mersin is 64 kilometres (40 mi). The main agricultural product of the village is grapes.
