= Özlüce, Tarsus =

Özlüce
- Neighbourhood
- Location in Turkey
- Coordinates: 37°00′N 35°03′E
- Country: Turkey
- Province: Mersin
- District: Tarsus
- Elevation: 45 m (148 ft)
- Population (2022): 361
- Time zone: UTC+3 (TRT)
- Area code: 0324

Özlüce is a neighbourhood in the municipality and district of Tarsus, Mersin Province, Turkey. Its population is 361 (2022). It is situated in Çukurova (Cilicia of the antiquity) to the east of Tarsus. Turkish state highway D.400 is to the south and Turkish motor way O.51 is to the north of the village. Its distance to Tarsus is 16 kilometres (9.9 mi) and its distance to Mersin is 44 kilometres (27 mi). The village's main economic activity is farming with the most pronounced crop being grape.
