= Körlü Beyi =

Körlü Beyi Gürlü
- Neighbourhood
- Location in Turkey
- Coordinates: 37°04′N 34°55′E
- Country: Turkey
- Province: Mersin
- District: Tarsus
- Elevation: 180 m (590 ft)
- Population (2022): 63
- Time zone: UTC+3 (TRT)
- Area code: 0324

Körlü Beyi (or Körlübeyi; formerly Gürlü) is a neighbourhood in the municipality and district of Tarsus, Mersin Province, Turkey. Its population is 63 (2022). It is situated in Çukurova (Cilicia of the antiquity). Its distance to Tarsus is 18 kilometres (11 mi) and its distance to Mersin is 45 kilometres (28 mi). The former name of the village was Gürlü. The main economic activity is farming and the major crop is grape.
