= Baharlı, Tarsus =

Baharlı
- Neighbourhood
- Location in Turkey
- Coordinates: 36°45′N 34°57′E
- Country: Turkey
- Province: Mersin
- District: Tarsus
- Elevation: 1 m (3.3 ft)
- Population (2022): 277
- Time zone: UTC+3 (TRT)
- Area code: 0324

Baharlı is a neighbourhood in the municipality and district of Tarsus, Mersin Province, Turkey. Its population is 277 (2022). It is situated to the west of the Berdan River and about 4 kilometres (2.5 mi) north of the coast of the Mediterranean Sea. Its distance to Tarsus is 28 kilometres (17 mi) and its distance to Mersin is 58 kilometres (36 mi).
