= Bahşiş =

- Neighbourhood
- Location in Turkey
- Coordinates: 36°49′N 34°53′E
- Country: Turkey
- Province: Mersin
- District: Tarsus
- Elevation: 3 m (9.8 ft)
- Population (2022): 2,422
- Time zone: UTC+3 (TRT)
- Postal code: 33401
- Area code: 0324

Bahşiş is a neighbourhood in the municipality and district of Tarsus, Mersin Province, Turkey. Its population is 2,422 (2022). Before the 2013 reorganisation, it was a town (belde). It is situated in the Çukurova plain. Its distance to Tarsus is 11 kilometres (6.8 mi).
