= Hacıbozan =

- Neighbourhood
- Location in Turkey
- Coordinates: 36°56′N 35°00′E
- Country: Turkey
- Province: Mersin
- District: Tarsus
- Elevation: 15 m (49 ft)
- Population (2022): 232
- Time zone: UTC+3 (TRT)
- Area code: 0324

Hacıbozan is a neighbourhood in the municipality and district of Tarsus, Mersin Province, Turkey. Its population is 232 (2022). It is situated in Çukurova (Cilicia of the antiquity) plains to the south of Turkish state highway D.400. The distance to Tarsus is 8 kilometres (5.0 mi) and the distance to Mersin is 36 kilometres (22 mi).
