= Aliefendioğlu =

- Neighbourhood
- Location in Turkey
- Coordinates: 36°52′N 34°55′E
- Country: Turkey
- Province: Mersin
- District: Tarsus
- Elevation: 12 m (39 ft)
- Population (2022): 930
- Time zone: UTC+3 (TRT)
- Area code: 0324

Aliefendioğlu is a neighbourhood in the municipality and district of Tarsus, Mersin Province, Turkey. Its population is 930 (2022). It is situated in Çukurova (Cilicia of the antiquity) plains to the south of Tarsus. The distance to Tarsus is 4 kilometres (2.5 mi) and the distance to Mersin is 28 kilometres (17 mi).
