= Konaklar, Tarsus =

Konaklar
- Neighbourhood
- Location in Turkey
- Coordinates: 36°57′N 35°00′E
- Country: Turkey
- Province: Mersin
- District: Tarsus
- Elevation: 20 m (66 ft)
- Population (2022): 280
- Time zone: UTC+3 (TRT)
- Area code: 0324

Konaklar is a neighbourhood in the municipality and district of Tarsus, Mersin Province, Turkey. Its population is 280 (2022). It is situated in the Çukurova (Cilicia of the antiquity) plains to the south of Turkish state highway D.400. The neighborhood's distance to Tarsus is 8 kilometres (5.0 mi) and the distance to Mersin is 36 kilometres (22 mi). The main economic activity is agriculture. Cotton, wheat and various vegetables are produced.
