= Cırbıklar, Tarsus =

Cırbıklar
- Neighbourhood
- Location in Turkey
- Coordinates: 37°04′N 34°58′E
- Country: Turkey
- Province: Mersin
- District: Tarsus
- Elevation: 180 m (590 ft)
- Population (2022): 119
- Time zone: UTC+3 (TRT)
- Area code: 0324

Cırbıklar is a neighbourhood in the municipality and district of Tarsus, Mersin Province, Turkey. Its population is 119 (2022). It is situated in the Çukurova (Cilicia of antiquity) plains to the east of motor way O.21. The distance to Tarsus is 18 kilometres (11 mi) and the distance to Mersin is 48 kilometres (30 mi).
