= Damlama =

- Neighbourhood
- Location in Turkey
- Coordinates: 37°08′N 34°52′E
- Country: Turkey
- Province: Mersin
- District: Tarsus
- Elevation: 515 m (1,690 ft)
- Population (2022): 325
- Time zone: UTC+3 (TRT)
- Area code: 0324

Damlama is a neighbourhood in the municipality and district of Tarsus, Mersin Province, Turkey. Its population is 325 (2022). It lies on the Turkish state highway D.750. It is located 30 kilometres (19 mi) away from Tarsus and 57 kilometres (35 mi) away from Mersin.
