= Mantaş, Tarsus =

Mantaş
- Neighbourhood
- Location in Turkey
- Coordinates: 36°53′N 34°55′E
- Country: Turkey
- Province: Mersin
- District: Tarsus
- Elevation: 10 m (33 ft)
- Population (2022): 337
- Time zone: UTC+3 (TRT)
- Area code: 0324

Mantaş is a neighbourhood in the municipality and district of Tarsus, Mersin Province, Turkey. Its population is 337 (2022). It is situated in Çukurova and to the south of Tarsus. It is almost merged with Tarsus. Its distance to Mersin is about 30 kilometres (19 mi).
