= Karayayla, Tarsus =

Karayayla
- Neighbourhood
- Location in Turkey
- Coordinates: 37°01′N 34°59′E
- Country: Turkey
- Province: Mersin
- District: Tarsus
- Elevation: 150 m (490 ft)
- Population (2022): 205
- Time zone: UTC+3 (TRT)
- Area code: 0324

Karayayla is a neighbourhood in the municipality and district of Tarsus, Mersin Province, Turkey. Its population is 205 (2022). It is situated in Çukurova (Cilicia of the antiquity) to the northeast of Tarsus and the junction of the motor ways O.21 and O.52. The village is slightly elevated with respect to the plains. Its distance to Tarsus is 15 kilometres (9.3 mi) and its distance to Mersin is 40 kilometres (25 mi). The main economic activity of the village is agriculture. Grapes are the major crop of the village.
