= Sıraköy, Tarsus =

Sıraköy
- Neighbourhood
- Location in Turkey
- Coordinates: 37°02′N 34°51′E
- Country: Turkey
- Province: Mersin
- District: Tarsus
- Elevation: 185 m (607 ft)
- Population (2022): 346
- Time zone: UTC+3 (TRT)
- Area code: 0324

Sıraköy is a neighbourhood in the municipality and district of Tarsus, Mersin Province, Turkey. Its population is 346 (2022). It is situated in the southern slopes of Toros Mountains. Turkish state highway D.750 is to the east of, and the Berdan dam reservoir is to the south of the village. The distance to Tarsus is 22 kilometres (14 mi) and the distance to Mersin is 45 kilometres (28 mi). The major crop of the village is grape.
