= Eskişehir, Tarsus =

Eskişehir
- Neighbourhood
- Location in Turkey
- Coordinates: 37°02′N 34°56′E
- Country: Turkey
- Province: Mersin
- District: Tarsus
- Elevation: 145 m (476 ft)
- Population (2022): 82
- Time zone: UTC+3 (TRT)
- Area code: 0324

Eskişehir is a neighbourhood in the municipality and district of Tarsus, Mersin Province, Turkey. Its population is 82 (2022). It is situated in Çukurova (Cilicia of the antiquity). It is located about 10 kilometres (6.2 mi) away from Tarsus and 37 kilometres (23 mi) away from Mersin. The main crop of the village is grapes.
