= Hasanağa, Tarsus =

Hasanağa
- Neighbourhood
- Location in Turkey
- Coordinates: 36°49′N 34°56′E
- Country: Turkey
- Province: Mersin
- District: Tarsus
- Elevation: 2 m (7 ft)
- Population (2022): 187
- Time zone: UTC+3 (TRT)
- Area code: 0324

Hasanağa is a neighbourhood in the municipality and district of Tarsus, Mersin Province, Turkey. Its population is 187 (2022). It is situated in Çukurova (Cilicia of the antiquity). Its distance to Tarsus is 12 kilometres (7.5 mi) and its distance to Mersin is 42 kilometres (26 mi). The major crop of the village is cotton.
