= Topçu, Tarsus =

Topçu
- Neighbourhood
- Location in Turkey
- Coordinates: 37°03′N 35°02′E
- Country: Turkey
- Province: Mersin
- District: Tarsus
- Elevation: 135 m (443 ft)
- Population (2022): 87
- Time zone: UTC+3 (TRT)
- Area code: 0324

Topçu is a neighbourhood in the municipality and district of Tarsus, Mersin Province, Turkey. Its population is 87 (2022). It is situated to the north of Çukurova (Cilicia of the antiquity) and to the northeast of Tarsus. It lies 25 kilometres (16 mi) away from Tarsus and 53 kilometres (33 mi) away from Mersin.
