= Yeşiltepe, Mersin =

Yeşiltepe Çatalkeli
- Neighbourhood
- Location in Turkey
- Coordinates: 36°51′N 34°54′E
- Country: Turkey
- Province: Mersin
- District: Tarsus
- Elevation: 3 m (9.8 ft)
- Population (2022): 2,137
- Time zone: UTC+3 (TRT)
- Postal code: 33401
- Area code: 0324

Yeşiltepe (former Çatalkeli) is a neighbourhood in the municipality and district of Tarsus, Mersin Province, Turkey. Its population is 2,137 (2022). Before the 2013 reorganisation, it was a town (belde).

== Geography ==
Yeşiltepe is located between Tarsus (8 kilometres to the south) and the coast of the Mediterranean Sea (8 kilometres to the north) in the plains of Çukurova. Karabucak Forest is slightly to the north of Yeşiltepe.

== History ==
No document exists about the deep history of the settlement. But probably before the project of Karabucak forest during the republican era, it was only a small village because of the marshes around the village which made the otherwise fertile plains unarable. After the World War I the village (then known as Çatalkeli) was occupied by the French army. After the treaty of Ankara (1921) and the project of Karabucak forest, the population of the village began to increase. The name of the village was changed to Çataltepe in 1965 and to Çatalkuyu after a merger with another settlement. In 1989, the village was declared a township and renamed as Yeşiltepe.

== Economy ==
The town enjoys triple cropping income. The main agricultural products are vegetables such as leek, cabbage and tomato. Water melon is another important crop.
