= Hacıhamzalı =

- Neighbourhood
- Location in Turkey
- Coordinates: 37°04′N 34°50′E
- Country: Turkey
- Province: Mersin
- District: Tarsus
- Elevation: 450 m (1,480 ft)
- Population (2022): 1,204
- Time zone: UTC+3 (TRT)
- Area code: 0324

Hacıhamzalı is a neighbourhood in the municipality and district of Tarsus, Mersin Province, Turkey. Its population is 1,204 (2022). It is to the north of Tarsus and Berdan Dam reservoir. Its distance to Tarsus is 28 kilometres (17 mi) and its distance to Mersin is 55 kilometres (34 mi).
