= Çiftlik, Tarsus =

Çiftlik
- Neighbourhood
- Location in Turkey
- Coordinates: 37°08′N 34°50′E
- Country: Turkey
- Province: Mersin
- District: Tarsus
- Elevation: 550 m (1,800 ft)
- Population (2022): 278
- Time zone: UTC+3 (TRT)
- Area code: 0324

Çiftlik is a neighbourhood in the municipality and district of Tarsus, Mersin Province, Turkey. Its population is 278 (2022). It is situated in the southern slopes of the Taurus Mountains to the west of Turkish state highway D.750. The distance to Tarsus is 20 kilometres (12 mi) and the distance to Mersin is 50 kilometres (31 mi). The main agricultural product of the village is grape.
