= Yeniköy, Tarsus =

Yeniköy
- Neighbourhood
- Location in Turkey
- Coordinates: 37°11′N 34°51′E
- Country: Turkey
- Province: Mersin
- District: Tarsus
- Elevation: 825 m (2,707 ft)
- Population (2022): 136
- Time zone: UTC+3 (TRT)
- Area code: 0324

Yeniköy is a neighbourhood in the municipality and district of Tarsus, Mersin Province, Turkey. Its population is 136 (2022). It is situated in the Taurus Mountains to the west of Turkish state highway D.750. Its distance to Tarsus is 40 kilometres (25 mi) and its distance to Mersin is 70 kilometres (43 mi).
