= Çavuşlu, Tarsus =

Çavuşlu
- Neighbourhood
- Location in Turkey
- Coordinates: 37°09′N 34°55′E
- Country: Turkey
- Province: Mersin
- District: Tarsus
- Elevation: 400 m (1,300 ft)
- Population (2022): 224
- Time zone: UTC+3 (TRT)
- Area code: 0324

Çavuşlu is a neighbourhood in the municipality and district of Tarsus, Mersin Province, Turkey. Its population is 224 (2022). It is situated in the southern slopes of the Taurus Mountains to the east of the Turkish state highway D.750. The distance to Tarsus is 35 kilometres (22 mi) and the distance to Mersin is 65 kilometres (40 mi). The main agricultural product of the village is grape.
