= Kızılçukur, Tarsus =

Kızılçukur
- Neighbourhood
- Location in Turkey
- Coordinates: 37°06′N 34°49′E
- Country: Turkey
- Province: Mersin
- District: Tarsus
- Elevation: 520 m (1,710 ft)
- Population (2022): 291
- Time zone: UTC+3 (TRT)
- Area code: 0324

Kızılçukur is a neighbourhood in the municipality and district of Tarsus, Mersin Province, Turkey. Its population is 291 (2022). It is situated in the southern slopes of the Toros Mountains. Berdan River is 3 kilometres (1.9 mi) to the west of the village. The village lies 35 kilometres (22 mi) away from Tarsus 60 kilometres (37 mi) away from Mersin.
