= Kefeli, Tarsus =

Kefeli
- Neighbourhood
- Location in Turkey
- Coordinates: 36°48′02″N 35°08′12″E
- Country: Turkey
- Province: Mersin
- District: Tarsus
- Elevation: 5 m (16 ft)
- Population (2022): 94
- Time zone: UTC+3 (TRT)
- Area code: 0324

Kefeli is a neighbourhood in the municipality and district of Tarsus, Mersin Province, Turkey. Its population is 94 (2022). It is situated in the Çukurova plains. Its distance to Tarsus is 33 kilometres (21 mi) and to Mersin is 62 kilometres (39 mi). The village's main economic activity is farming. Cotton and various vegetables are produced.
