= İncirgediği =

- Neighbourhood
- Location in Turkey
- Coordinates: 37°06′N 34°59′E
- Country: Turkey
- Province: Mersin
- District: Tarsus
- Elevation: 185 m (607 ft)
- Population (2022): 169
- Time zone: UTC+3 (TRT)
- Area code: 0324

İncirgediği is a neighbourhood in the municipality and district of Tarsus, Mersin Province, Turkey. Its population is 169 (2022). It is on to the east of Turkish state highway D.750. It is 28 kilometres (17 mi) away from Tarsus and 57 kilometres (35 mi) away from Mersin.
