= Çiriştepe, Tarsus =

Çiriştepe
- Neighbourhood
- Location in Turkey
- Coordinates: 36°56′N 34°44′E
- Country: Turkey
- Province: Mersin
- District: Tarsus
- Elevation: 185 m (607 ft)
- Population (2022): 157
- Time zone: UTC+3 (TRT)
- Area code: 0324

Çiriştepe is a neighbourhood in the municipality and district of Tarsus, Mersin Province, Turkey. Its population is 157 (2022). It is situated in Çukurova (Cilicia of antiquity) to the east of Tarsus and between Turkish motorway O-31 and Turkish state highway D.750. Çiriştepe is also a railway stop. The village's distance to Tarsus is 20 kilometres (12 mi) and the distance to Mersin is 45 kilometres (28 mi).
