= İnköy, Tarsus =

İnköy
- Neighbourhood
- Location in Turkey
- Coordinates: 37°14′N 34°43′E
- Country: Turkey
- Province: Mersin
- District: Tarsus
- Elevation: 880 m (2,890 ft)
- Population (2022): 531
- Time zone: UTC+3 (TRT)
- Area code: 0324

İnköy is a neighbourhood in the municipality and district of Tarsus, Mersin Province, Turkey. Its population is 531 (2022). It is situated in the Toros Mountains on the east bank of Berdan River. Its distance to Tarsus is 65 kilometres (40 mi) and to Mersin is 90 kilometres (56 mi).
