= Mahmutağa, Tarsus =

Mahmutağa
- Neighbourhood
- Location in Turkey
- Coordinates: 36°56′N 34°58′E
- Country: Turkey
- Province: Mersin
- District: Tarsus
- Elevation: 20 m (66 ft)
- Population (2022): 441
- Time zone: UTC+3 (TRT)
- Area code: 0324

Mahmutağa is a neighbourhood in the municipality and district of Tarsus, Mersin Province, Turkey. Its population is 441 (2022). It is situated in Çukurova on the Turkish state highway D.400. It lies 6 kilometres (3.7 mi) away from Tarsus and 33 kilometres (21 mi) away from Mersin.
