= Ballıca, Tarsus =

Ballıca
- Neighbourhood
- Location in Turkey
- Coordinates: 36°54′N 35°01′E
- Country: Turkey
- Province: Mersin
- District: Tarsus
- Elevation: 10 m (30 ft)
- Population (2022): 156
- Time zone: UTC+3 (TRT)
- Area code: 0324

Ballıca is a neighbourhood in the municipality and district of Tarsus, Mersin Province, Turkey. Its population is 156 (2022). It is situated in the plains of Çukurova (Cilicia of the antiquity). Its distance to Tarsus is 15 kilometres (9.3 mi) and its distance to Mersin is 42 kilometres (26 mi).

There are tumuli of ancient ages around the village, but the modern village was founded in 1730 by Yörüks (once-nomadic Turkmen). During the brief occupation by Ibrahim Pasha of Egypt in the 19th century, cotton farming was introduced to the village. After the village was returned to the Ottoman Empire, Turkmen from Elazığ were settled in the village to work in cotton fields. After irrigation facilities were improved during the republican era after 1923, cotton production increased.
