= Taşobası =

- Neighbourhood
- Location in Turkey
- Coordinates: 37°05′26″N 34°55′41″E
- Country: Turkey
- Province: Mersin
- District: Tarsus
- Elevation: 255 m (837 ft)
- Population (2022): 1,095
- Time zone: UTC+3 (TRT)
- Area code: 0324

Taşobası is a neighbourhood in the municipality and district of Tarsus, Mersin Province, Turkey. Its population is 1,095 (2022). It is on Turkish state highway D.750. It is 15 kilometres (9.3 mi) away from Tarsus and 42 kilometres (26 mi) away from Mersin.
