= Göçük, Tarsus =

Turkish village

Göçük
- Neighbourhood
- Location in Turkey
- Coordinates: 37°05′N 34°52′E
- Country: Turkey
- Province: Mersin
- District: Tarsus
- Elevation: 410 m (1,350 ft)
- Population (2022): 226
- Time zone: UTC+3 (TRT)
- Area code: 0324

Göçük is a neighbourhood in the municipality and district of Tarsus, Mersin Province, Turkey. Its population is 226 (2022). It is situated in the peneplane area to the south of the Taurus Mountains and to the north of Berdan Resorvoir. It is located about 20 kilometres (12 mi) away from Tarsus and 57 kilometres (35 mi) away from Mersin. The main crop of the village is grapes.
