= Yalamık, Tarsus =

Yalamık
- Neighbourhood
- Location in Turkey
- Coordinates: 37°08′N 34°46′E
- Country: Turkey
- Province: Mersin
- District: Tarsus
- Elevation: 715 m (2,346 ft)
- Population (2022): 249
- Time zone: UTC+3 (TRT)
- Area code: 0324

Yalamık is a neighbourhood in the municipality and district of Tarsus, Mersin Province, Turkey. Its population is 249 (2022). It is situated in the Berdan River valley to the south of Kadıncık Dam reservoir. Yalamık is located 33 kilometres (21 mi) away from Tarsus and 60 kilometres (37 mi) away from Mersin.
