= Çağbaşı, Tarsus =

Çağbaşı
- Neighbourhood
- Location in Turkey
- Coordinates: 36°52′N 35°04′E
- Country: Turkey
- Province: Mersin
- District: Tarsus
- Elevation: 5 m (16 ft)
- Population (2022): 492
- Time zone: UTC+3 (TRT)
- Area code: 0324

Çağbaşı is a neighbourhood in the municipality and district of Tarsus, Mersin Province, Turkey. Its population is 492 (2022). It is situated in Çukurova (Cilicia of the antiquity) to the southeast of Tarsus. The distance to Tarsus is 17 kilometres (11 mi) and the distance to Mersin is 47 kilometres (29 mi). The village is situated in a fertile area and the main products are grapes and cotton.
