= Pamukluk Dam =

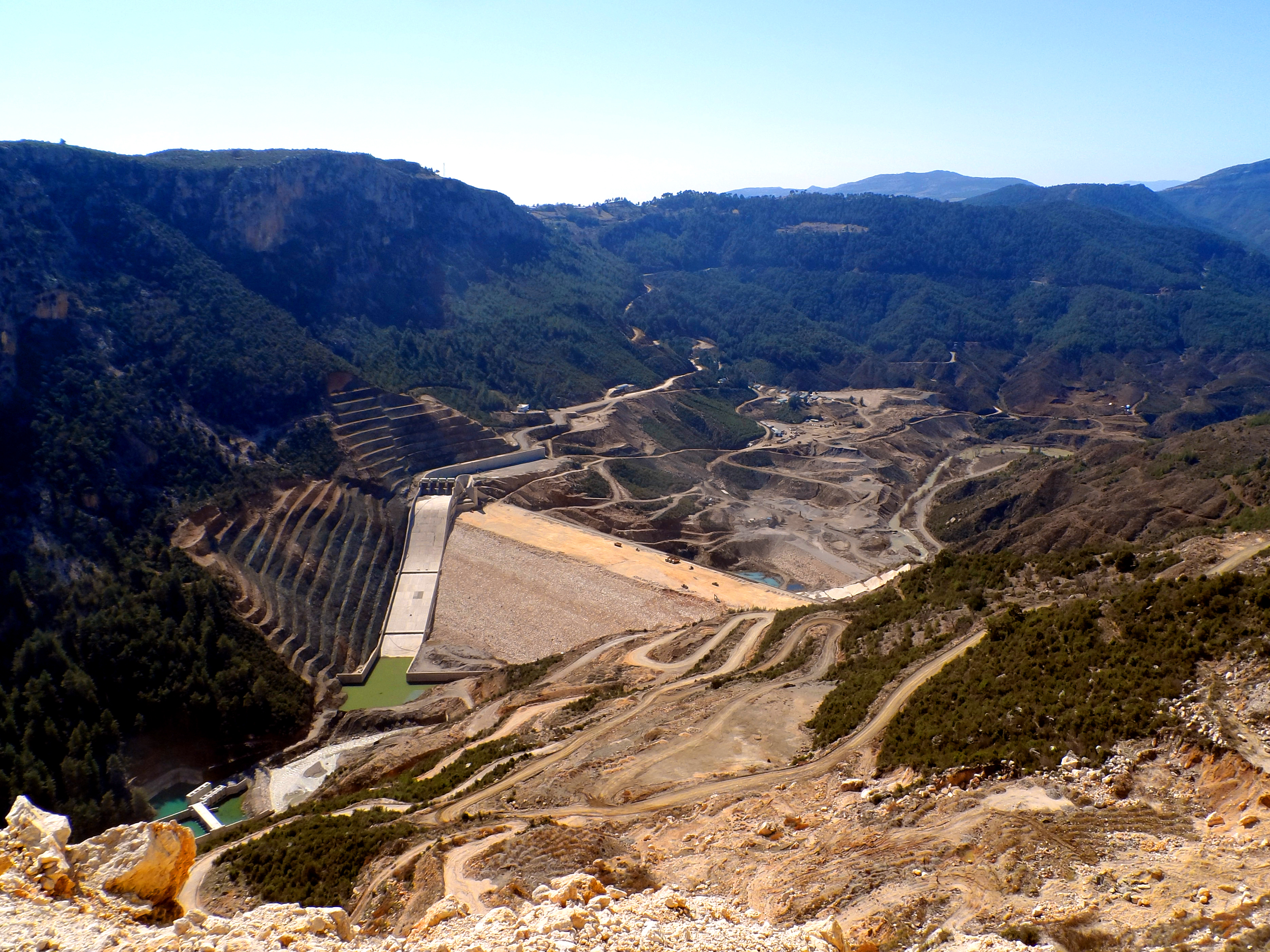
- Location: Turkey
- Coordinates: 37°04′N 34°43′E

Dam and spillways
- Impounds: Berdan River

Reservoir
- Total capacity: 282,000,000 m^{3} (228,621 acre⋅ft)

Power Station
- Annual generation: 68 GWh

Pamukluk Dam (Turkish: Pamukluk Barajı) is a hydroelectric plant in Mersin Province, southern Turkey. Currently, it is under construction and about 84 percent of the construction has already been completed.

== Location ==
The dam is at Çamlıyayla and Tarsus ilçes of Mersin Province. It is on Pamukluk River, a tributary of Berdan River. The northernmost point of the plant is at about 37°04′N 34°43′E.

== Details ==
When completed, the capacity of the reservoir will be 282×10^{6} m^{3} (10.0×10^{9} cu ft). It will irrigate 184×10^{6} m^{2} (1,980×10^{6} sq ft) and will produce 68 million KW-hour of electrical energy. Its water will also be used as drinking water in many towns and villages. Its contribution to Turkish economy will be 131 million Turkish lira.
