= Kadelli =

- Neighbourhood
- Location in Turkey
- Coordinates: 37°06′N 34°54′E
- Country: Turkey
- Province: Mersin
- District: Tarsus
- Elevation: 320 m (1,050 ft)
- Population (2022): 388
- Time zone: UTC+3 (TRT)
- Area code: 0324

Kadelli is a neighbourhood in the municipality and district of Tarsus, Mersin Province, Turkey. Its population is 388 (2022). A part of the village (Dörtler) lies on Turkish state highway D.750. It is located 27 kilometres (17 mi) away from Tarsus and 54 kilometres (34 mi) away from Mersin. The main agricultural crop of the village is grape which is commercially known as Tarsus beyazı (literally "white of Tarsus"). Wheat and cotton are other products.
