= Koçmarlı, Tarsus =

Koçmarlı
- Neighbourhood
- Location in Turkey
- Coordinates: 37°08′31″N 34°54′40″E
- Country: Turkey
- Province: Mersin
- District: Tarsus
- Elevation: 315 m (1,033 ft)
- Population (2022): 160
- Time zone: UTC+3 (TRT)
- Area code: 0324

Koçmarlı is a village in the municipality and district of Tarsus, Mersin Province, Turkey. Its population is 160 (2022). It is situated in the southern slopes of the Toros Mountains. Its distance to Tarsus is 37 kilometres (23 mi) and its distance to Mersin is 60 kilometres (37 mi).
