= Karabucak Forest =

Forest in Turkey

- Interactive map of Karabucak Forest

Geography
- Area: 1200 ha

Karabucak Forest is a forest plantation in Turkey.

== Geography ==
The forest is at the south of Tarsus city in Mersin Province. The center of the forest is at about 36°53′N 34°52′E. The distance to Tarsus is 5 kilometres (3.1 mi) and to Mersin is 25 kilometres (16 mi). There are two sections in the forest. In the older section called Güresin forest Eucalyptus (Eucalyptus camaldulensis) has been planted and in the newer section called Turan Emeksiz, stone pine (Pinus pinea) and maritime pine (Pinus pinaster) have been planted along with a few other species (Güresin was the surname of Fehmi Güresin, the engineer in charge of the project back in 1939 and Turan Emeksiz was the name of a forestry engineering student killed in 1960).

== History ==
During the ancient ages, Tarsus was a Mediterranean Sea port. But because of alluvial deposits from the Berdan River the coastline was continuously moving to south. By the 6th century, the coastline had already been moved away and a small lagoon named Rhegma had been formed which obstructed the river flow in the rainy seasons and caused floods. Byzantine Emperor Justinian I (reigned 527-565) had a channel constructed at the east of the city to facilitate easier flow. (present watercourse of the river). After 7th century the lake was partially dried up and turned into marshes. But because of the marshes, the number of malaria cases increased sharply. In 1939, the Turkish government (ministry of forestry) started a project to drain the marshes. Eucalyptus trees were planted on 885 hectare area and the marshes were totally drained. In 1960s the forest was further enlarged by covering the coastal band. Pine was preferred in the coastal band.

== Karabucak today ==
The marsh has been drained and the sands movement at the coast has been checked. The forest in addition to being a source of revenue, is now a popular picnic area for Tarsus citizens.
