= Eminlik, Tarsus =

Eminlik
- Neighbourhood
- Location in Turkey
- Coordinates: 37°15′N 34°55′E
- Country: Turkey
- Province: Mersin
- District: Tarsus
- Elevation: 995 m (3,264 ft)
- Population (2022): 183
- Time zone: UTC+3 (TRT)
- Area code: 0324

Eminlik is a neighbourhood in the municipality and district of Tarsus, Mersin Province, Turkey. Its population is 183 (2022). It is situated in the Taurus Mountains and extreme east of the province. It is about 50 kilometres (31 mi) away from Tarsus and 77 kilometres (48 mi) away from Mersin.
