= Heleke, Tarsus =

Heleke
- Neighbourhood
- Location in Turkey
- Coordinates: 36°55′N 34°58′E
- Country: Turkey
- Province: Mersin
- District: Tarsus
- Elevation: 15 m (49 ft)
- Population (2022): 294
- Time zone: UTC+3 (TRT)
- Area code: 0324

Heleke (formerly: Reşadiye) is a neighbourhood in the municipality and district of Tarsus, Mersin Province, Turkey. Its population is 294 (2022). It is situated in Çukurova plains (Cilicia of the antiquity) to the east of Tarsus and is very close to Tarsus. Its distance to Mersin is 33 kilometres (21 mi). Various agricultural crops are produced in the village, the most pronounced crops being grapes and cotton.
