= Keşli, Tarsus =

Keşli
- Neighbourhood
- Location in Turkey
- Coordinates: 37°16′N 34°53′E
- Country: Turkey
- Province: Mersin
- District: Tarsus
- Elevation: 1,220 m (4,000 ft)
- Population (2022): 283
- Time zone: UTC+3 (TRT)
- Area code: 0324

Keşli is a neighbourhood in the municipality and district of Tarsus, Mersin Province, Turkey. Its population is 283 (2022). It is situated in the Toros Mountains. It is a mountain village. Its distance to Tarsus is 62 kilometres (39 mi) and its distance to Mersin is 85 kilometres (53 mi).
