= Büyükkösebalcı =

- Neighbourhood
- Location in Turkey
- Coordinates: 37°01′N 34°51′E
- Country: Turkey
- Province: Mersin
- District: Tarsus
- Elevation: 150 m (490 ft)
- Population (2022): 194
- Time zone: UTC+3 (TRT)
- Area code: 0324

Büyükkösebalcı is a neighbourhood in the municipality and district of Tarsus, Mersin Province, Turkey. Its population is 194 (2022). It is situated in the peneplane area to the south of the Taurus Mountains and to the north of Berdan Dam reservoir. Its distance to Tarsus is 15 kilometres (9.3 mi) and its distance to Mersin is 41 kilometres (25 mi).
