= Pirömerli, Tarsus =

Pirömerli
- Neighbourhood
- Location in Turkey
- Coordinates: 37°02′N 34°43′E
- Country: Turkey
- Province: Mersin
- District: Tarsus
- Elevation: 630 m (2,070 ft)
- Population (2022): 316
- Time zone: UTC+3 (TRT)
- Area code: 0324

Pirömerli is a neighbourhood in the municipality and district of Tarsus, Mersin Province, Turkey.

== Geography ==
Its population is 316 (2022).

It is situated on the lower slopes of the Taurus Mountains.

Its distance to Tarsus is 30 kilometres (19 mi) and its distance to Mersin is 60 kilometres (37 mi).

The village is a Turkmen village. The main economic sector of the village is agriculture with grape being the main product.
