= Taşkuyu, Tarsus =

Taşkuyu
- Neighbourhood
- Location in Turkey
- Coordinates: 36°57′N 34°47′E
- Country: Turkey
- Province: Mersin
- District: Tarsus
- Elevation: 200 m (700 ft)
- Population (2022): 392
- Time zone: UTC+3 (TRT)
- Area code: 0324

Taşkuyu is a neighbourhood in the municipality and district of Tarsus, Mersin Province, Turkey. Its population is 392 (2022). It is close to Eshabıkehf, the cave of Seven Sleepers, which is considered a pilgrimage center by some. It is 10 kilometres (6.2 mi) to Tarsus and 37 kilometres (23 mi) to Mersin.
