= Cin, Tarsus =

Cin
- Neighbourhood
- Location in Turkey
- Coordinates: 36°59′N 34°45′E
- Country: Turkey
- Province: Mersin
- District: Tarsus
- Elevation: 170 m (560 ft)
- Population (2022): 594
- Time zone: UTC+3 (TRT)
- Area code: 0324

Cin (or Cinköy) is a neighbourhood in the municipality and district of Tarsus, Mersin Province, Turkey. Its population is 594 (2022). It is situated to the South of the Taurus Mountains and to the North of Turkish motorway O.51. The distance to Tarsus is 24 kilometres (15 mi) and the distance to Mersin is 45 kilometres (28 mi). Grapes are the most important agricultural product of the village.
