= İbrişim, Tarsus =

İbrişim
- Neighbourhood
- Location in Turkey
- Coordinates: 37°00′N 34°49′E
- Country: Turkey
- Province: Mersin
- District: Tarsus
- Elevation: 205 m (673 ft)
- Population (2022): 498
- Time zone: UTC+3 (TRT)
- Area code: 0324

İbrişim is a neighbourhood in the municipality and district of Tarsus, Mersin Province, Turkey. Its population is 498 (2022). It is situated on the lower slopes of the Toros Mountains. Its distance to Tarsus is 12 kilometres (7.5 mi). The main economic sector of the village is viticulture. Olives and various fruits are also produced.
