= Ulaş, Tarsus =

Ulaş
- Neighbourhood
- Location in Turkey
- Coordinates: 37°00′N 34°47′E
- Country: Turkey
- Province: Mersin
- District: Tarsus
- Elevation: 310 m (1,020 ft)
- Population (2022): 1,274
- Time zone: UTC+3 (TRT)
- Area code: 0324

Ulaş is a neighbourhood in the municipality and district of Tarsus, Mersin Province, Turkey. Its population is 1,274 (2022). It is situated on the lower slopes of the Toros Mountains and on the road connecting Tarsus to Çamlıyayla. It is 12 kilometres (7.5 mi) northwest of Tarsus. According to Ulaş school page the village was founded as the winter settlement of the Turkmen nomads after 1375. The main economic sector of the village is viticulture. Olives and various fruits are also produced. There is also an olive press in the village.
