= Mersin Free Zone =

Economic zone in Turkey

Mersin Free Zone is a free economic zone in Mersin, Turkey. It is in the Mediterranean Mersin Harbor area at 36°46′20″N 34°39′00″E.

It was established on 3 January 1987. It was the first free zone of Turkey. Its initial area was 776 decares (0.776 km^{2}; 0.300 sq mi) The area is now 836 decares (0.836 km^{2}; 0.323 sq mi). It is operated by Mesbaş firm with build-operate-transfer method. With a handling capacity of 9 million tonnes of bulk cargo and 2.6 million tonnes of containerized cargo it is the second largest free zone of Turkey.
