= Dorak, Tarsus =

Dorak
- Neighbourhood
- Location in Turkey
- Coordinates: 37°02′N 34°38′E
- Country: Turkey
- Province: Mersin
- District: Tarsus
- Elevation: 825 m (2,707 ft)
- Population (2022): 207
- Time zone: UTC+3 (TRT)
- Area code: 0324

Dorak is a neighbourhood in the municipality and district of Tarsus, Mersin Province, Turkey. Its population is 207 (2022). It is situated in the Taurus Mountains, 37 kilometres (23 mi) away from Tarsus and 65 kilometres (40 mi) away from Mersin.
