= Tekeliören =

- Neighbourhood
- Location in Turkey
- Coordinates: 36°58′N 35°00′E
- Country: Turkey
- Province: Mersin
- District: Tarsus
- Elevation: 27 m (89 ft)
- Population (2022): 798
- Time zone: UTC+3 (TRT)
- Area code: 0324

Tekeliören is a neighbourhood in the municipality and district of Tarsus, Mersin Province, Turkey. Its population is 798 (2022). It is close to state road D.400. Its distance to Tarsus is 8 kilometres (5.0 mi) and its distance to Mersin is 35 kilometres (22 mi).
