= Tepeköy, Tarsus =

Tepeköy
- Neighbourhood
- Location in Turkey
- Coordinates: 36°59′N 34°44′E
- Country: Turkey
- Province: Mersin
- District: Tarsus
- Elevation: 245 m (804 ft)
- Population (2022): 130
- Time zone: UTC+3 (TRT)
- Area code: 0324

Tepeköy is a neighbourhood in the municipality and district of Tarsus, Mersin Province, Turkey. Its population is 130 (2022). It is situated on the southern slopes of the Toros Mountains. It is 26 kilometres (16 mi) to Tarsus and 50 kilometres (31 mi) to Mersin.
