= Topaklı, Tarsus =

Topaklı
- Neighbourhood
- Location in Turkey
- Coordinates: 37°05′N 34°45′E
- Country: Turkey
- Province: Mersin
- District: Tarsus
- Elevation: 590 m (1,940 ft)
- Population (2022): 386
- Time zone: UTC+3 (TRT)
- Area code: 0324

Topaklı is a neighbourhood in the municipality and district of Tarsus, Mersin Province, Turkey. Its population is 386 (2022). It is situated in the Taurus Mountains. It lies 30 kilometres (19 mi) away from Tarsus and 57 kilometres (35 mi) away from Mersin. There are some Roman ruins around the village, but they are not officially registered. There is a marble quarry to the west of the village.
