= Kütüklü, Tarsus =

Kütüklü
- Neighbourhood
- Location in Turkey
- Coordinates: 37°02′02″N 35°03′36″E
- Country: Turkey
- Province: Mersin
- District: Tarsus
- Elevation: 100 m (330 ft)
- Population (2022): 141
- Time zone: UTC+3 (TRT)
- Area code: 0324

Kütüklü is a neighbourhood in the municipality and district of Tarsus, Mersin Province, Turkey. Its population is 141 (2022). Its distance from Tarsus is 24 kilometres (15 mi) and its distance to Mersin is 54 kilometres (34 mi).
