= Taşçılı, Tarsus =

Taşçılı
- Neighbourhood
- Location in Turkey
- Coordinates: 36°59′N 34°41′E
- Country: Turkey
- Province: Mersin
- District: Tarsus
- Elevation: 315 m (1,033 ft)
- Population (2022): 605
- Time zone: UTC+3 (TRT)
- Area code: 0324

Taşçılı is a neighbourhood in the municipality and district of Tarsus, Mersin Province, Turkey. Its population is 605 (2022). It is situated on the lower slopes of the Toros Mountains. Its distance to Tarsus is 27 kilometres (17 mi) and its distance to Mersin is 25 kilometres (16 mi). The village is a Turkmen village. The main economic sectors of the village are agriculture and animal breeding. Grapes, carab, olive and various citrus species are among the crops. Poultry raising as well as ovine and cattle husbandry are other economic activities. Taşçılı is one of the villages in which dairying is promoted by the government.
