= Kozoluk =

- Neighbourhood
- Location in Turkey
- Coordinates: 37°12′N 34°55′E
- Country: Turkey
- Province: Mersin
- District: Tarsus
- Elevation: 775 m (2,543 ft)
- Population (2022): 159
- Time zone: UTC+3 (TRT)
- Area code: 0324

Kozoluk is a neighbourhood in the municipality and district of Tarsus, Mersin Province, Turkey. Its population is 159 (2022). It is situated in the southern slopes of the Toros Mountains. Kozoluk lies 40 kilometres (25 mi) away from Tarsus and 67 kilometres (42 mi) away from Mersin.
