= Kurtçukuru, Tarsus =

Kurtçukuru
- Neighbourhood
- Location in Turkey
- Coordinates: 37°10′N 34°45′E
- Country: Turkey
- Province: Mersin
- District: Tarsus
- Elevation: 523 m (1,716 ft)
- Population (2022): 107
- Time zone: UTC+3 (TRT)
- Area code: 0324

Kurtçukuru is a neighbourhood in the Tarsus district of Mersin Province, Turkey. Its population is 107 (2022). It is situated in the southern slopes of the Toros Mountains and to the west of Turkish state highway D.400. Its distance to Tarsus is 50 kilometres (31 mi), and the distance to Mersin is 75 kilometres (47 mi).
