= Tepetaşpınar =

- Neighbourhood
- Location in Turkey
- Coordinates: 37°01′N 34°40′E
- Country: Turkey
- Province: Mersin
- District: Tarsus
- Elevation: 735 m (2,411 ft)
- Population (2022): 192
- Time zone: UTC+3 (TRT)
- Area code: 0324

Tepetaşpınar is a neighbourhood in the municipality and district of Tarsus, Mersin Province, Turkey. Its population is 192 (2022). It lies in the Toros Mountains, 40 kilometres (25 mi) away from Tarsus and 60 kilometres (37 mi) away from Mersin.
