= Cambazlı =

- Neighbourhood
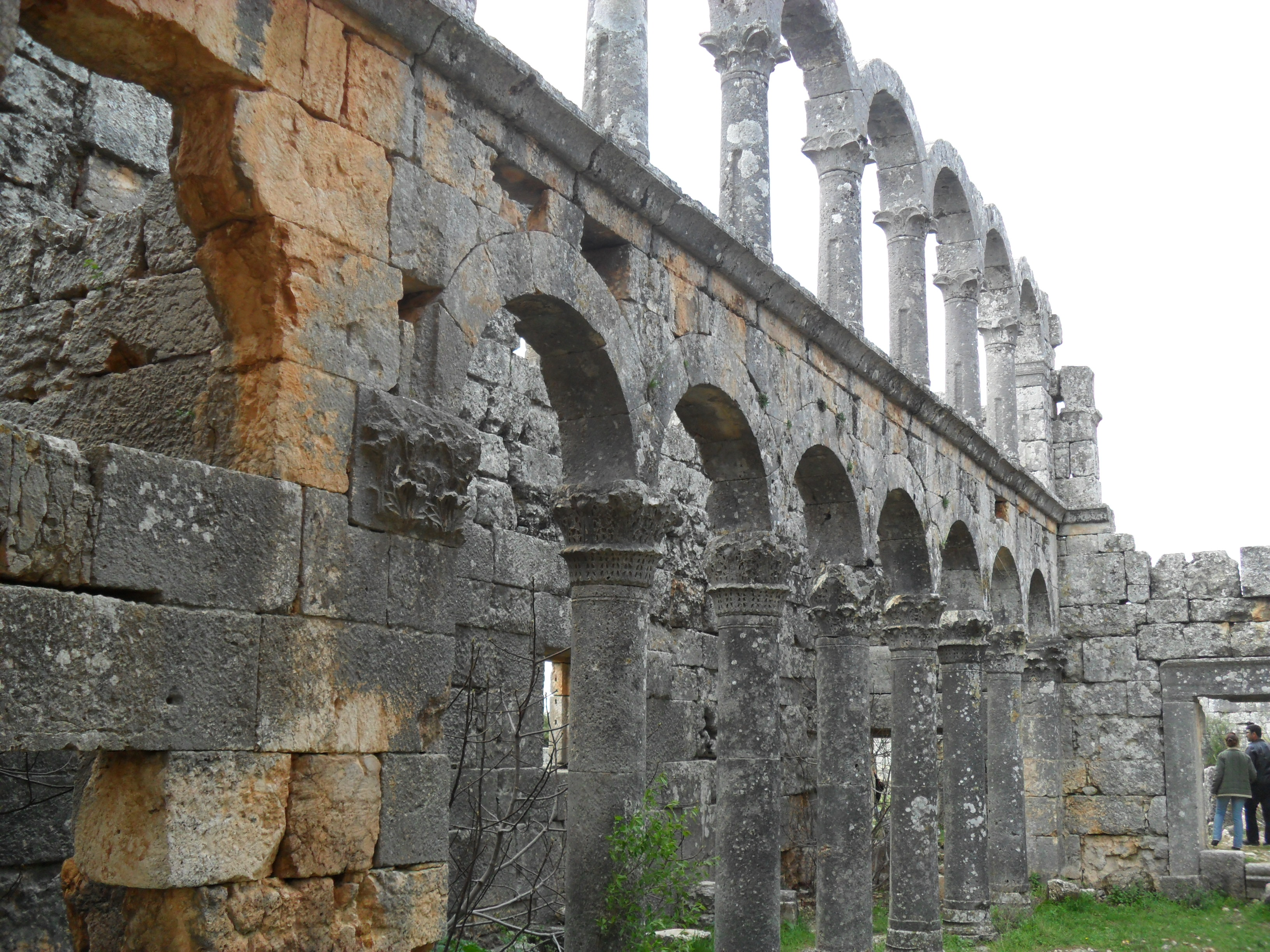

- Location within Turkey
- Coordinates: 36°35′N 34°02′E
- Country: Turkey
- Province: Mersin
- District: Silifke
- Elevation: 925 m (3,035 ft)
- Population (2022): 686
- Time zone: UTC+3 (TRT)
- Postal code: 33940
- Area code: 0324

Cambazlı is a neighbourhood in the municipality and district of Silifke, Mersin Province, Turkey. Its population is 686 (2022).

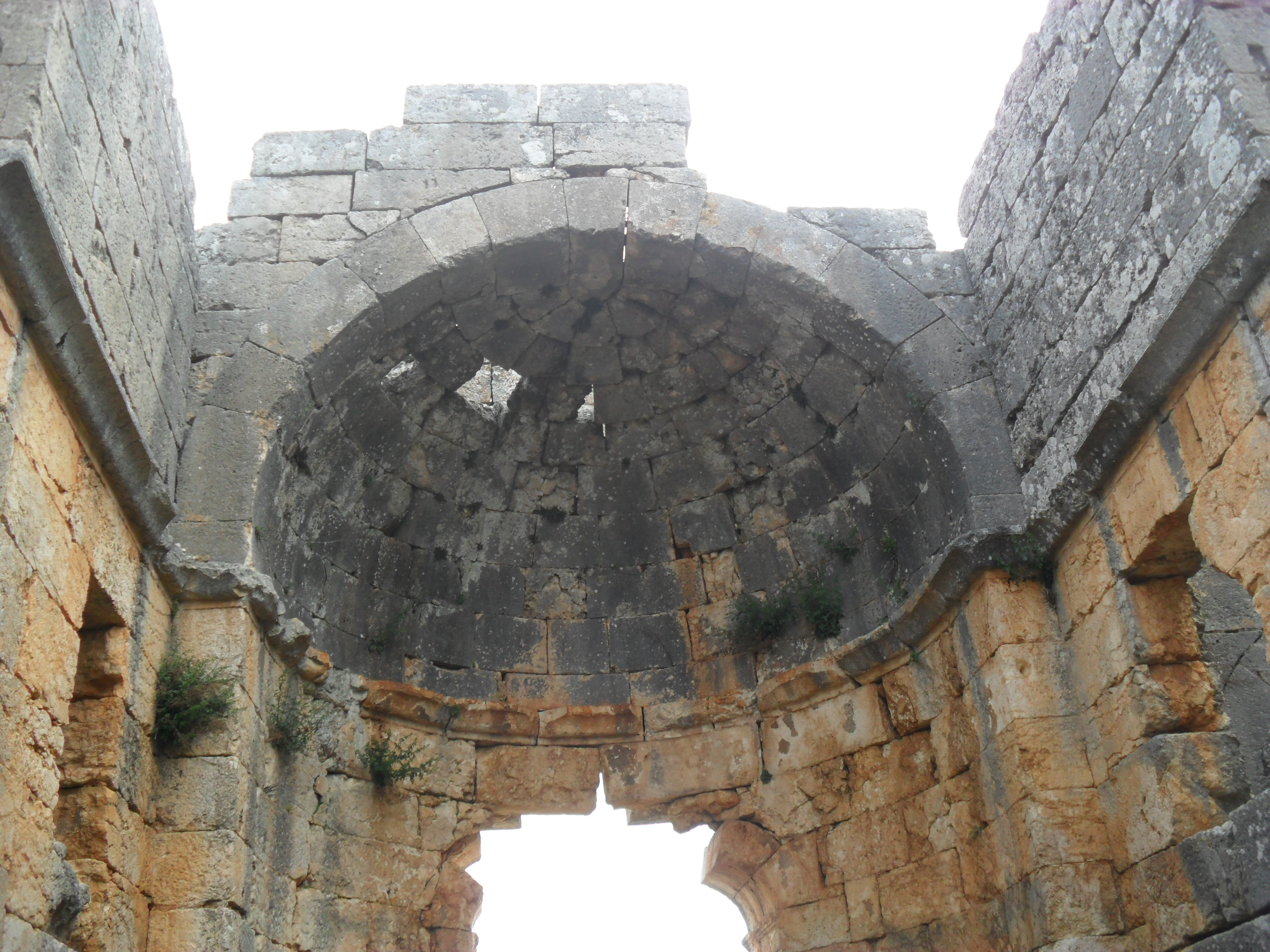

It is situated in the plateau to the south of the Taurus Mountains. The distance to Silifke is 30 kilometres (19 mi) and to Mersin is 85 kilometres (53 mi).

== Cambazlı Ruins ==
Cambazlı was an important settlement during the early Byzantine age. It is on the road connecting Uzuncaburç (Diocæsarea) to Kızkalesi (Corycus), both important ancient settlements.
