= Sanlıca =

- Neighbourhood
- Location in Turkey
- Coordinates: 37°14′N 34°51′E
- Country: Turkey
- Province: Mersin
- District: Tarsus
- Elevation: 1,000 m (3,300 ft)
- Population (2022): 78
- Time zone: UTC+3 (TRT)
- Area code: 0324

Sanlıca is a neighbourhood in the municipality and district of Tarsus, Mersin Province, Turkey. Its population is 78 (2022). It is situated in the Taurus Mountains in the extreme east of the province. It is about 45 kilometres (28 mi) to Tarsus and 72 kilometres (45 mi) to Mersin.
