= Kaklıktaşı =

- Neighbourhood
- Location in Turkey
- Coordinates: 37°01′N 34°41′E
- Country: Turkey
- Province: Mersin
- District: Tarsus
- Elevation: 580 m (1,900 ft)
- Population (2022): 297
- Time zone: UTC+3 (TRT)
- Area code: 0324

Kaklıktaşı is a neighbourhood in the municipality and district of Tarsus, Mersin Province, Turkey. Its population is 297 (2022). It is situated in the Taurus Mountains. Its distance to Tarsus is 32 kilometres (20 mi) and to Mersin is 36 kilometres (22 mi). The area around Kaklıktaşı was populated in the Roman Empire era of the 2nd and 3rd centuries. But the village was founded during the Ottoman period. Main economic activities are agriculture animal breeding and poultry husbandry.
