= Olukkoyağı, Tarsus =

Olukkoyağı
- Neighbourhood
- Location in Turkey
- Coordinates: 37°14′N 34°41′E
- Country: Turkey
- Province: Mersin
- District: Tarsus
- Elevation: 1,005 m (3,297 ft)
- Population (2022): 566
- Time zone: UTC+3 (TRT)
- Area code: 0324

Olukkoyağı is a neighbourhood in the municipality and district of Tarsus, Mersin Province, Turkey. Its population is 566 (2022). It is situated in the Toros Mountains. Its distance to Tarsus is 68 kilometres (42 mi) and its distance to Mersin is 93 kilometres (58 mi). There is a trout farm in the location named Papazınbahçesi for production of a trout species named salma trıutta.
