= Sandal, Tarsus =

Sandal
- Neighbourhood
- Location in Turkey
- Coordinates: 37°11′N 34°47′E
- Country: Turkey
- Province: Mersin
- District: Tarsus
- Elevation: 975 m (3,199 ft)
- Population (2022): 183
- Time zone: UTC+3 (TRT)
- Area code: 0324

Sandal is a neighbourhood in the municipality and district of Tarsus, Mersin Province, Turkey. Its population is 183 (2022). It lies in the Toros Mountains. It is 43 kilometres (27 mi) to Tarsus and 70 kilometres (43 mi) to Mersin. The village was founded in 1945 by issuing from the neighbouring village Panzinçukuru.
