= Yenice, Tarsus =

Turkish neighborhood

Yenice
- Neighbourhood
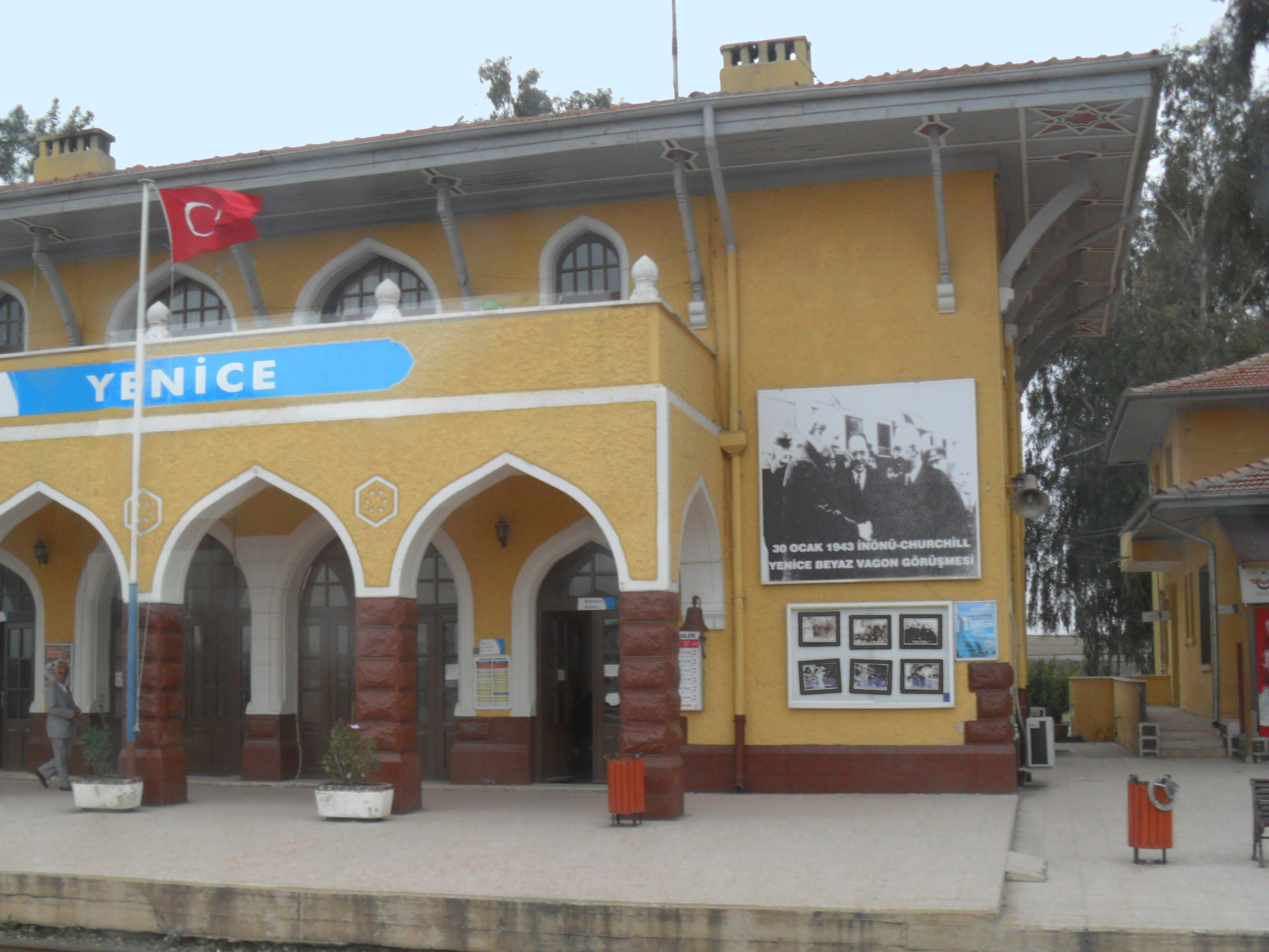
- Yenice railway station

- Location within Turkey
- Coordinates: 36°58′N 35°03′E
- Country: Turkey
- Province: Mersin
- District: Tarsus
- Elevation: 30 m (98 ft)
- Population (2022): 8,433
- Time zone: UTC+3 (TRT)
- Postal code: 33800
- Area code: 0324

Yenice is a neighbourhood in the municipality and district of Tarsus, Mersin Province, Turkey. Its population is 8,433 (2022). Before the 2013 reorganisation, it was a town (belde).

== Geography ==
Yenice is situated in the extreme east of Mersin province, 15 kilometres (9.3 mi) east of Tarsus, 43 kilometres (27 mi) east of Mersin, and 25 kilometres (16 mi) west of Adana. The Mediterranean coast is about 30 kilometres (19 mi) to south.

== History ==
The village was established in 1543 during the Ottoman era by Oghuz Turks (Turkmens). The name of the town probably refers to a certain Yenice Bey who was a rebellious Turkmen chief who lived in the first half of the 16th century. In the early years of the 19th century, the town was briefly occupied by the rebellious İbrahim Pasha of Egypt. After the First World War, Yenice was shortly occupied by France (cf. Sykes–Picot Agreement). After the Treaty of Ankara, 20 October 1921, Yenice was ceded to Turkey.

On 30 January 1943, during the Second World War, the Adana Conference between the Turkish president İsmet İnönü and the British prime minister Winston Churchill was held in a railway carriage at Yenice Railway Station to discuss Turkey's role in the war. The carriage is now displayed in the station.

In 1953 Yenice was declared a township.

== Economy ==
The town is situated in the fertile Çukurova plain (ancient Cilicia). It is approximately at the midpoint between the Seyhan and Berdan rivers. The most important crop is cotton, followed by vegetables, citrus and wheat. There is also some light industry.

Yenice is an important railway junction on the Adana–Mersin railway, connecting to the Konya/Ankara line to the north. It lies on the Çukurova Motorway. The airport of Adana is within 20 minutes and the newer Çukurova Airport is under construction near the town. The Port of Mersin is within 45 minutes.
