= Çukurova Motorway =

Motorway in South Turkey

Çukurova motorway (Turkish: Çukurova otoyolu) is the unofficial name of the motorway (Turkish: otoyol) of Çukurova (ancient Cilicia) in Turkey. It is actually composed of the motorways O-51 (from Mersin to Adana), O-53 (from Ceyhan to İskenderun) and a part of O-52 (between O-51 and O-53).

== The list of junctions ==
Mersin Province	Adana Province	Hatay Province

Junction code	Location	Distance from prev. location (km.)	Distance from prev. location (mi.)
K9	Çeşmeli (Summer houses)		
K7	Kuyuluk (West Mersin)	10.6	6.6
K6	Mersin (North Mersin and Gözne)	14.5	9
K5	Serbest Bölge (Mersin Free Zone)	4.8	3
K4	West Tarsus	24	14.9
K3	Çamtepe (Tarsus)	11	6.8
K2	East Tarsus (Yenice)	2.1	1.3
K2	West Adana	19.1	11.9
K1	North Adana	8.6	5.3
K1	East Adana (Kozan)	15.1	9.4
K2	Misis	15.5	9.6
K3	Ceyhan-Yumurtalık	23.4	14.5
K4	Junction of O-52	11.5	7.1
K1.1	Industrial region (Free zone of Yumurtalık)	7.1	4.4
K2	Gözeneller	8.9	5.5
K3	Erzin	2.4	1.5
K4	Dörtyol	16.1	10
K5	Payas	13.8	8.6
K6	İskenderun	16	9.9
K7	Çankaya (South İskenderun)	7.2	4.5
K8	Belen	4.8	3

The total distance between the two ends is 236 kilometres (147 mi).

== Connections ==
The main junctions of the motorway are as follows;

- At junction K2; (east of Tarsus), it merges to another motorway; O-21 to north .
- At junction K4; (east of Ceyhan), it continues as O-52 to east.
- At junction K9; (Çeşmeli) it is connected to D.400 highway (Datça Mersin highway) to west.
- At junction K3; (Çamtepe) it is connected to D.750 highway to north.
- At junction K8; (Belen) it is connected to D.817 (E-91) highway to southeast.
