= Berdan Dam =

Coordinates: 36.966°N 34.8953°E

- Interactive map of Berdan Dam
- Location: Turkey
- Construction began: 1975
- Opening date: 1984

Dam and spillways
- Impounds: Berdan River
- Height: 66 m (217 ft)
- Dam volume: 1,928,000 m^{3} (2,521,729 cu yd)

Reservoir
- Total capacity: 88,000,000 m^{3} (71,343 acre⋅ft)

Power Station
- Installed capacity: 10 MW
- Annual generation: 47 GWh

Berdan Dam is an embankment dam on the Berdan River in Mersin Province, Turkey. It was built between 1975 and 1984. It supports a 10 MW power station, and provides water for the irrigation of 27,050 hectares (66,800 acres).

== See also ==
- List of dams and reservoirs in Turkey
