= State road D.750 (Turkey) =

Road in Turkey

D.750

Route information
- Part of E90
- Length: 722 km (449 mi)

Major junctions
- North end: Zonguldak
- South end: Tarsus

Location
- Country: Turkey

Highway system
- Highways in Turkey; Motorways; List; State Highways; List

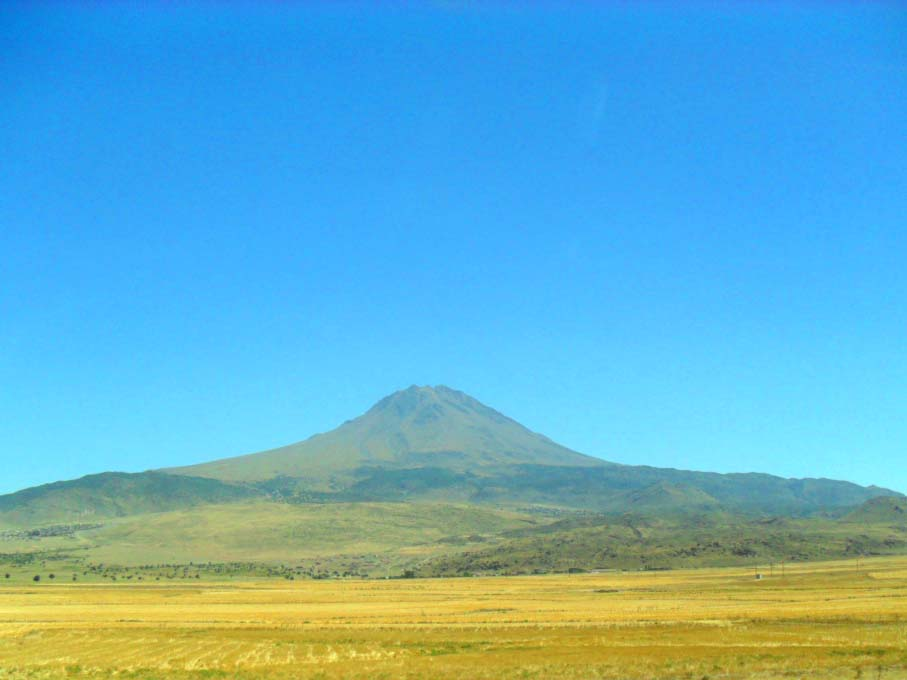
View of the volcano Hasandağı from the D750 state road, south of Aksaray.

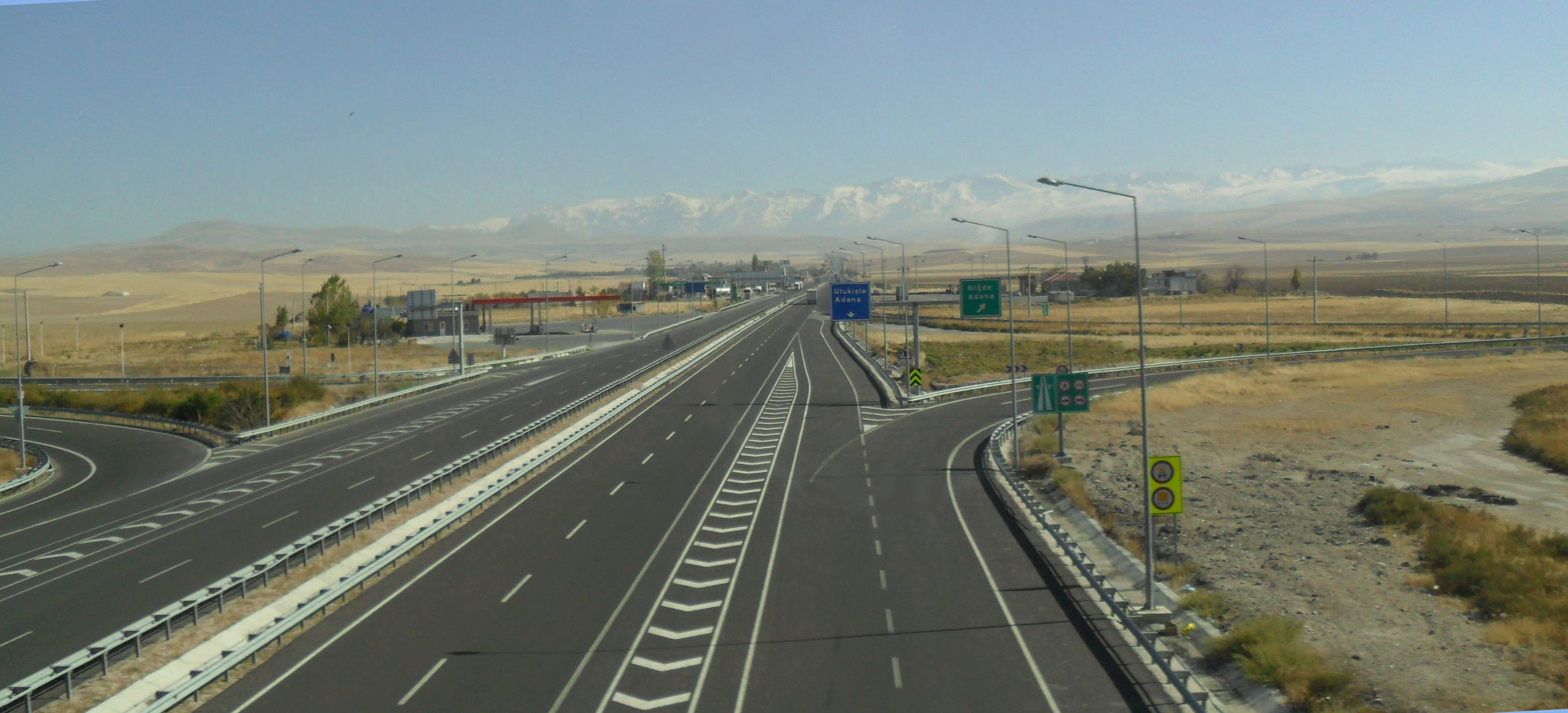
Turkish state road D 750 at Konya junction. Toros Mountains in the background

D.750 is a north-to-south state road in Turkey. It starts at Zonguldak at the Black Sea coast and ends at the junction of D.400 near Tarsus in the Mediterranean Region. Across its length of 722 km, it crosses many state roads, including the D.100, D.715, D.300, D.330 and D.805.

== Itinerary ==
Province	Location	Distance from Zonguldak (km)	Distance from Zonguldak (mile)	Distance from Tarsus (D400) (km)	Distance from Tarsus (D400) (mile)
Zonguldak
Zonguldak	Zonguldak	0	0	722	449
Zonguldak	Devrek	45	28	677	421
Bolu
Bolu	Mengen	102	63	620	385
Bolu	D100	122	76	600	373
Bolu	Gerede	133	83	589	366
Ankara
Ankara	Kızılcahamam	195	121	527	327
Ankara	Ankara (D140)	272	169	450	280
Konya	D715	371	231	351	218
Ankara	Şereflikoçhisar	418	260	304	189
Aksaray	Aksaray (D300)	496	308	226	140
Konya
Konya	D330 (north)	565	351	157	98
Konya	D330 (south)	587	365	135	84
Niğde
Niğde	Ulukışla	602	374	120	75
Niğde	D805	607	377	115	71
Adana	Pozantı	645	401	77	48
Mersin	Tarsus (D400)	722	449	0	0

== Connections to motorways ==
There are a number of connections to motorways of Turkey. Connections to O-4 are in Bolu and Ankara provinces. Connections to O-21 are in Konya, Adana and Mersin provinces and connection to O-51 is in Mersin province.
