= Berdan River =

River in Turkey

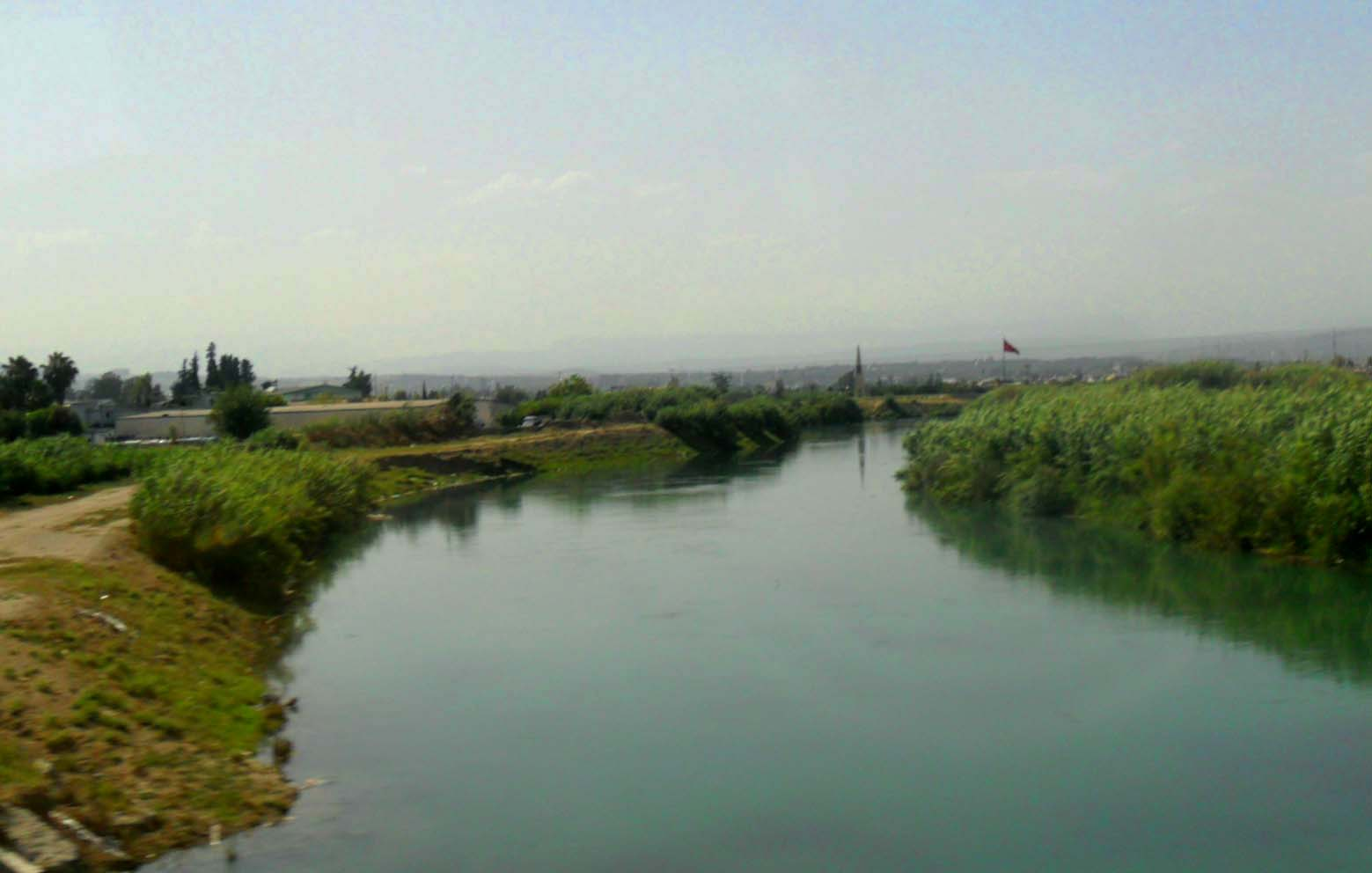
Berdan River from the south

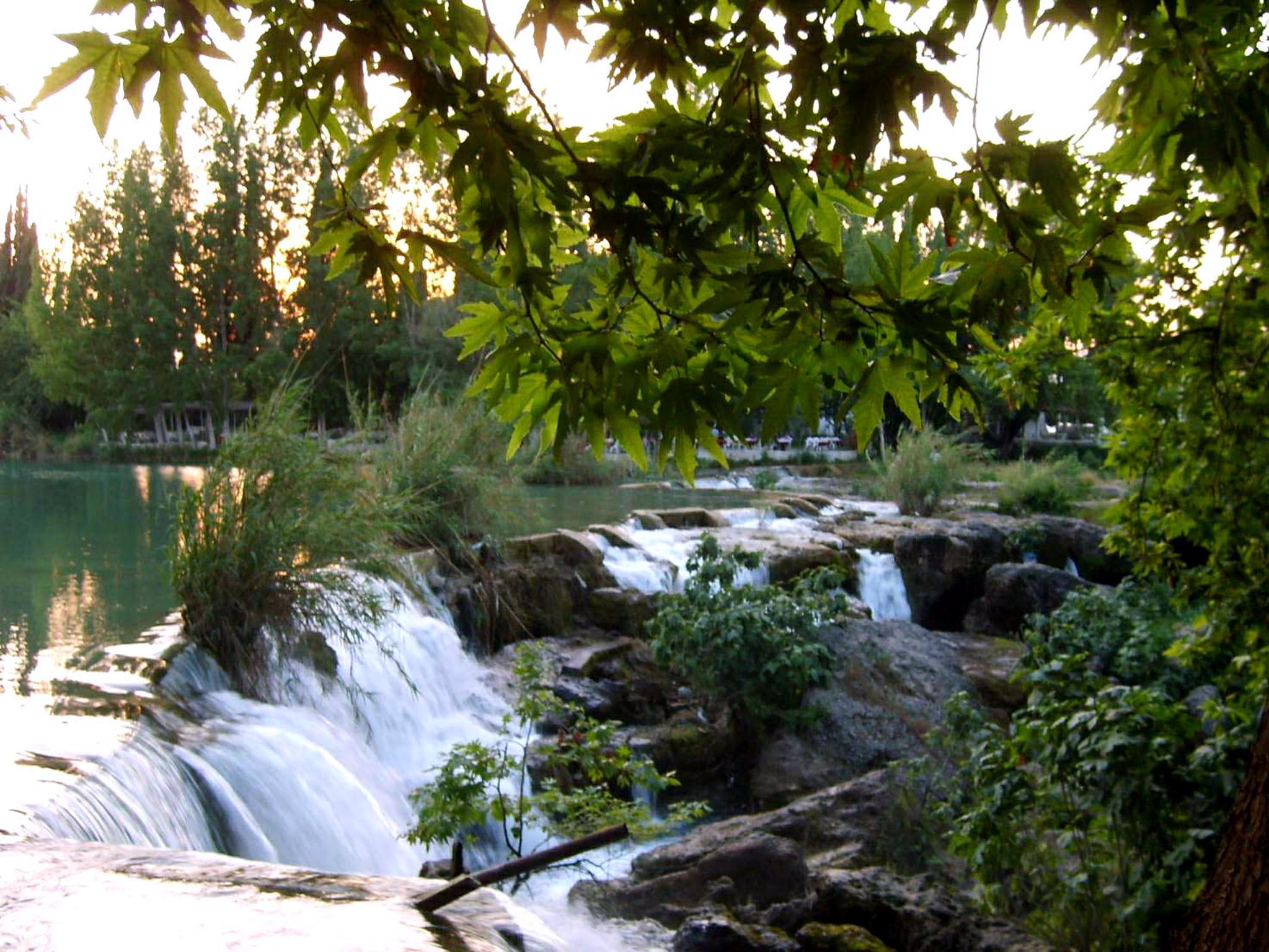
Berdan waterfall (Turkish: Tarsus şelalesi) from the east

The Berdan (also Baradān or Baradā), the ancient Cydnus (Ancient Greek: Κύδνος, romanized: Kúdnos), is a river in Mersin Province, south Turkey. The historical city of Tarsus is on the river and it is therefore sometimes called the Tarsus River. Originally the watercourse passed directly through the city, but the section in Tarsus was changed to its present course in the 6th century. The river is also the location of Tarsus Waterfall.

== Geography ==
The main headwaters are in the Toros Mountains. There are two main tributaries: Kadıncık and Pamukluk (its upper reaches are called Cehennem Deresi). Total length of the river is 124 kilometres (77 mi) (including Kadıncık). Although the river is quite short, the average discharge is 42 cubic metres per second (1,500 cu ft/s), which is higher than most short rivers in the vicinity. The drainage basin covers 1,592 square kilometres (615 sq mi). The river flows to the Mediterranean Sea at 36.47°N 34.50°E. Just north of Tarsus there is a waterfall on the river, which is a popular picnic area for Tarsus residents.

== Dams ==
There are four dams on Berdan. These are used both for controlling floods and for producing electricity. But the lower reaches of the river flow in an agricultural area, and because of the pollution caused by fertilisers the dams in the lower reaches are not used for drinking water.

Name of the dam	Construction date	Installed power, MW
Kadıncık I	1971	70
Kadıncık II	1974	56
Berdan	1996	10
Pamukluk	2003	23.9

== History and mythology ==
The Berdan River flows in one of the warmest regions of Turkey, but its upper reaches in the Toros Mountains make the water much cooler than the surrounding streams. Two prominent historical figures suffered severe health problems – possibly hypothermia and/or pneumonia – as a result of swimming in the river: Alexander the Great (333 BCE) and Caliph Al-Ma'mun (833 CE) both fell ill as a result and Al Mamun died,

In Greek mythology, the young Comaetho fell in love with the river-god Cydnus, and after the goddess Aphrodite transformed her into a spring, the two mixed waters forever.

Cleopatra sailed up the river (older watercourse) and first met Mark Antony aboard her boat.
