= Çukurova =

Fertile Plain in Turkey

Çukurova imposed on Mersin, Adana, Osmaniye and Hatay provinces.

Çukurova (Turkish pronunciation: [tʃuˈkuɾova]), or the Cilician Plain (Cilicia Pedias in antiquity), is a large fertile plain in the Cilicia region of southern Anatolia. The plain covers the easternmost areas of Mersin Province, southern and central Adana Province, western Osmaniye Province and northwestern Hatay Province.

== Etymology ==
Çukurova is a compound of the Turkish words çukur "hollow, depression" and ova "plains". The oldest recorded use of the name in Turkish can be traced back to Aşıkpaşazade's late 15th-century Ottoman Turkish work Tevârîh-i Âl-i Osmān.

== History ==
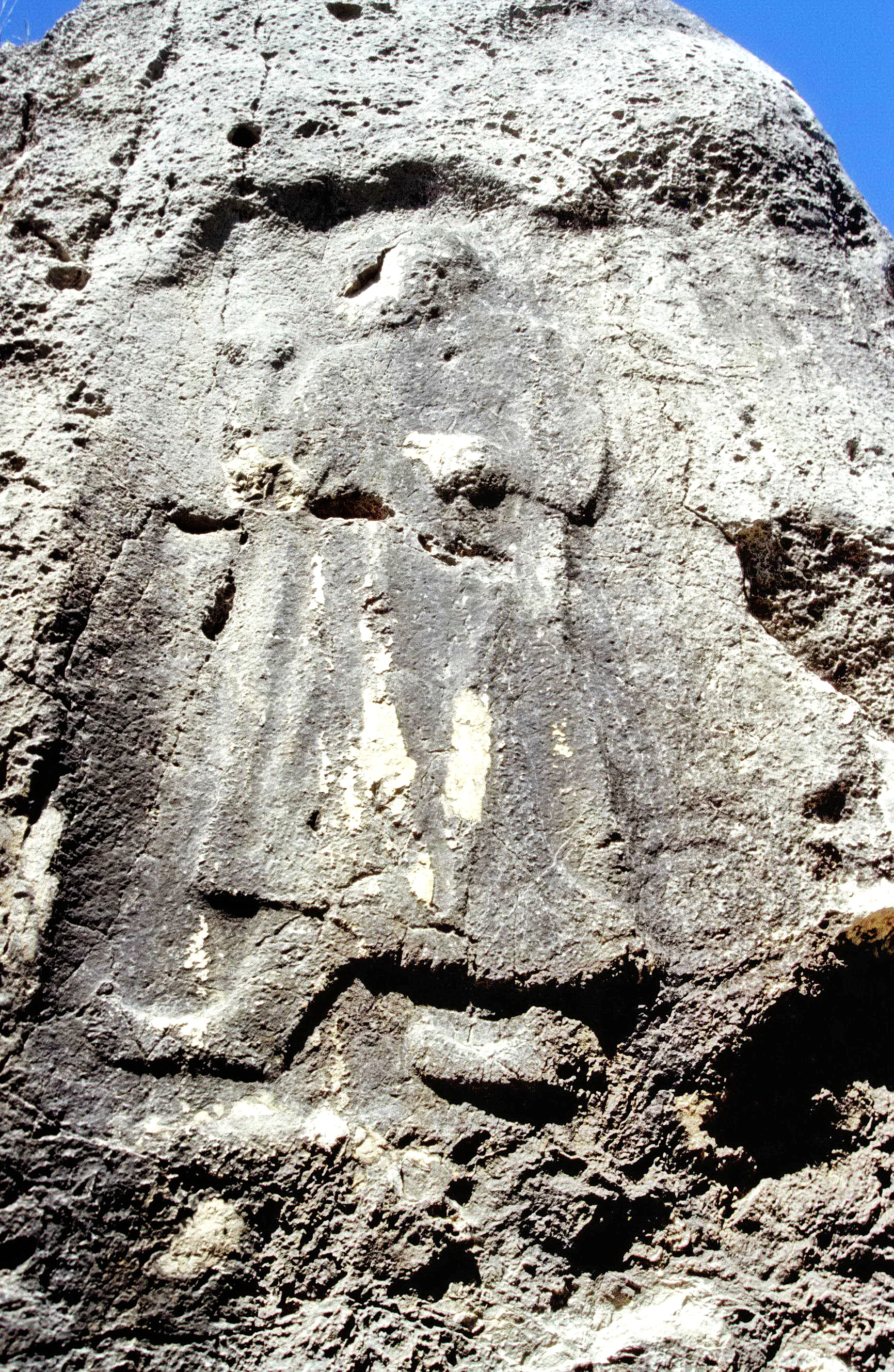
On the west bank of the Ceyhan river near the village of Sirkeli (Sirkeli Höyük), a late Hittite rock relief reminds of the presence of the Hittites in Çukurova (Cilician Plain). It shows the Hittite Great King Muwatalli II (1290–1272 BC)

The region's recorded history dates back over 6,000 years. During the Bronze Age, the region was known as Kizzuwatna. As an area located between the native Hurrian lands of Southeastern Anatolia and the native Luwian lands of the Mediterranean coast of Anatolia, it was a mixed Luwian-Hurrian region. Hence, these two indigenous languages, Luwian and Hurrian were prevalent in Kizzuwatna during the Bronze Age. The exact time of the Hittite conquest of Kizzuwatna is unknown but the scholars think that the region was incorporated into the Hittite Empire even before the reign of Ḫattušili I. Kizzuwatna plain was also known as Adaniya at the time.

Kizzuwatnan religion was similar to Hurrian religion as Tešup and Ḫepat form the main couple of gods in both pantheons. In the late 1270s BC Hittite Great King Ḫattušili III's marriage to the Kizzuwatna priestess Puduḫepa strengthened the Hurrian influence in the region and also increased the importance of the region among the provinces of the Hittite Empire. Išputaḫšu, Šunaššura, Eḫeya, Palliya and Padditaššu are the names of the Kizzuwatna kings that can be found in Hittite tablets. After the collapse of the Hittite Empire, a neo-Hittite kingdom called Ḫiyawa emerged in the region.

Armenian presence in Cilicia dates back to the first century BC, when under Tigranes the Great, the Kingdom of Armenia briefly expanded and conquered a vast region in the Levant. In 83 BC, the Greek aristocracy of Seleucid Syria, weakened by a bloody civil war, offered their allegiance to the ambitious Armenian king. During the Roman and early Byzantine Empires, the capital of the Province of Cilicia was the important seaport of Tarsus, where Mark Antony met Cleopatra, and birthplace of Paul the Apostle and Theodore of Tarsus, among other important missionaries.

The region became an early battleground between Muslim and Christian forces during the early Muslim conquest of the Levant, and was conquered in the 8th century and remained part of the Abbasid Caliphate until reconquered by Byzantine forces in 962. Shortly after, in 1080, Ruben founded the Armenian Kingdom of Cilicia. Throughout the Armenian period, the region was ruled by members of the royal Armenian House of Lampron.

When the Seljuk Turks captured the region in the 12th century, many Turkomans, including Oğuz clans of Yüreğir, Afshar and Chepni settled in the region's northern parts under the direction of Ramadanids. Those who preserved the nomadic lifestyle were named Yörüks. As of the 18th century, the Ottoman Empire pursued a policy aimed at settling these populations in permanent settlements; the process was more or less complete in the 19th century, although it involved many difficulties and much tension especially for the Ottoman dynasty.

Between the 1832 Convention of Kütahya leaving the territorial gains acquired by Ibrahim Pasha of Egypt to his administration till the 1841 London Conference convened to settle the question, Çukurova remained under the rule of the Khedive of Egypt. Although the period of Egyptian rule, motivated by Egypt's perennial need, timber for the navy, was relatively short, it left important marks in such areas as the introduction of industrial-scale cotton production and new arrivals into the population tissue of the region. Cottonpickers of Çukurova still start their workday with prayers for the memory of İbrahim Pasha, and the locally influent Menemencioğlu family, with notable descendants till our day, including Turkey's foreign minister during the Second World War, Numan Menemencioğlu, rose to notability by acting as middlemen for the Pasha. Among other families still prominent today and that had risen with the cotton boom, Kozanoğlu, Güveloğlu, Kerimoğlu, Karsantıoğlu, Küçükalioğlu families can be cited.

In 1869, the Vilayet of Adana (Adana Province) was incorporated after splitting up Aleppo Province. The borders of the Vilayet of Adana are similar to today's Çukurova region. Throughout the last remaining years of Ottoman rule, the region served as an important base for the Ottoman Navy.

The development of Mersin as a major port also began during this period. As a result, the cities of the region became prominent centers of trade, farming and industry. Today, Adana is the 5th largest city of Turkey, and a vital center of many agricultural products such as cotton.

== Population ==
The area has historically kept a mixed population, with Turks, Armenians and Arabs in significant numbers. The Arab population of the area are mostly Alawites, although Sunnis and orthodox Christians are also present. The number of Alawites in the provinces of Adana and Mersin region, determined through surveys and field work in 2000, was estimated between 247,000 and 329,000, encompassing the area's three large cities (Adana, Mersin and Tarsus) and the country side. The percentages of Alawite Arab are estimated at 5-6% in Mersin, 10-15% in Adana, and 15-20% in Tarsus. Thirty-two Alawite Arab villages are scattered in the area south of the Adana-Mersin road.

== Geography ==
Historically, the region was known as Kizuwatna by the Hittites and it was divided into two parts, Uru Adaniya (flat Cilicia) and western Cilicia (Tarza), which was also known as the mountainous Cilicia. The gates which allow passage from Çukurova into the Central Anatolian Plateau through the Taurus Mountains, the Cilician Gates of antiquity, is called Gülek Pass today. Belen Pass which connects the region to the southeast (to the modern district of Dörtyol in Hatay Province) and Sertavul Pass constitute other important points of passage. The region is included in the Mediterranean region of Turkey, and it borders Central Anatolia (historical Cappadocia) to the north, and Southeastern Anatolia to the east.

=== Natural resources ===
==== Agriculture ====
The Çukurova plain has very fertile soil. The region is the producer of all agricultural products of Turkey except hazelnut and tobacco. Çukurova leads Turkey in soy, peanuts and corn harvest and is a major producer of fruits and vegetables. Half of Turkey's citrus export is from Çukurova. Anamur is the only sub-tropical area of Turkey where bananas, mango, kiwi and other sub-tropical produce can be harvested.

Çukurova is the second largest honey producer in Turkey after the Muğla–Aydın region. Samandağ, Yumurtalık, Karataş and Bozyazı are some of the towns in the region where fishing is the major source of income. Gray mullet, red mullet, sea bass, lagos, calamari and gilt-head bream are some of the most popular fish in the region. There are aquaculture farms in Akyatan, Akyağan, Yumurtalık lakes and at Seyhan Reservoir. While not as common as other forms of agriculture, dairy and livestock are also produced throughout the region.

==== Mining ====
- Zinc and lead: Kozan-Horzum seam is the major source.
- Chrome is found around Aladağlar.
- Baryte resources are around Mersin and Adana.
- Iron is found around Feke and Saimbeyli.
- Asbestos mines are mostly in Hatay Province.
- Limestone reserves are very rich in Çukurova. The region is home to four lime manufacturing plants.
- Pumice resources are the richest in Turkey. 14% of the country's reserves are in Çukurova.

=== Parks and conservation areas ===
Akyatan Lagoon is a large wildlife refuge which acts as a stopover for migratory birds voyaging from Africa to Europe. The wildlife refuge has a 14,700-hectare (36,000-acre) area made up of forests, lagoon, marsh, sandy and reedy lands. Akyatan lake is a natural wonder with endemic plants and endangered bird species living in it together with other species of plants and animals. 250 species of birds are observed during a study in 1990. The conservation area is located 30 km south of Adana, near Tuzla.

Yumurtalık Nature Reserve covers an area of 16,430 hectares within the Seyhan-Ceyhan delta, with its lakes, lagoons and wide collection of plant and animal species. The area is an important location for many species of migrating birds, the number gets higher during the winters when the lakes become a shelter when other lakes further north freeze.

Karatepe-Aslantaş National Park located on the west bank of Ceyhan River in Osmaniye Province. The park include the Karatepe Hittite fortress and an open-air museum.

Tekköz-Kengerlidüz Nature Reserve, located 30 km north of Dörtyol, is known for having an ecosystem different from the Mediterranean. The main species of trees around Kengerliduz are beech, oak and fir, and around Tekkoz are hornbeam, ash, beach, black pine and silver birch. The main animal species in the area are wild goat, roe deer, bear, hyena, wild cat, wagtail, wolf, jackal and fox.

== Çukurova in popular culture ==
Culturally, the life and the hardships faced by the ordinary people of Çukurova was brought to the screen by many Turkish film directors including Yılmaz Güney, especially in his 1970 masterpiece Umut (The hope). It is impossible to make a reference to Çukurova without mentioning the internationally acclaimed author who gave the region legendary dimensions, Yaşar Kemal. The popular Turkish TV series Bir Zamanlar Çukurova is set in Çukurova, Adana.

== See also ==
- List of alluvial plains of Turkey
- List of municipalities in Çukurova
