= Tarsus, Mersin =

City in Turkey

Tarsus
- District and municipality
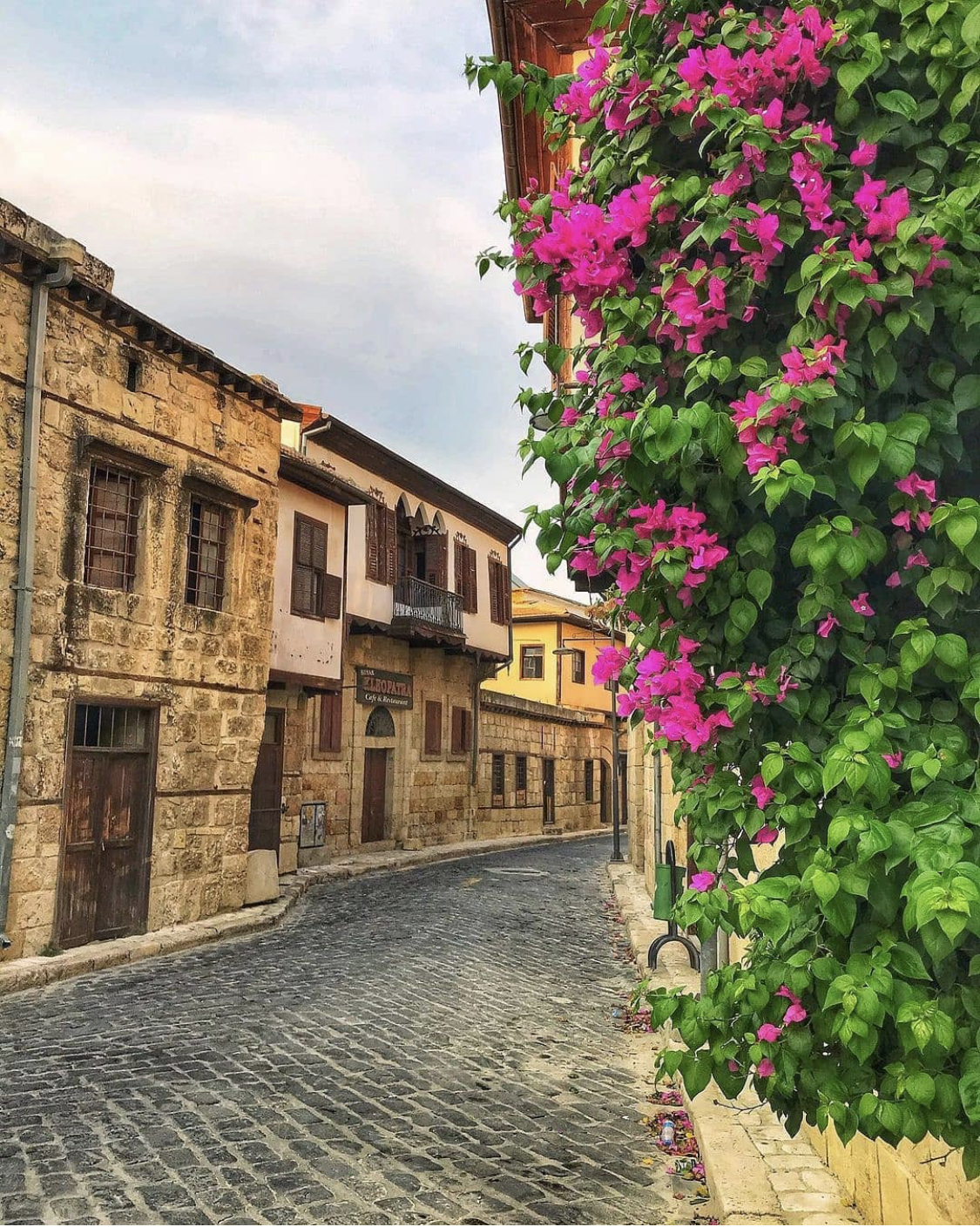
- Street view of the old town

- Logo

- Map showing Tarsus District in Mersin Province

- Location within Turkey
- Coordinates: 36°54′59″N 34°53′42″E
- Country: Turkey
- Province: Mersin

Government
  - Mayor: Ali Boltaç (CHP)
- Area: 2,029 km^{2} (783 sq mi)
- Population (2022): 350,732
  - Density: 172.9/km^{2} (447.7/sq mi)
- Time zone: UTC+3 (TRT)
- Area code: 0324
- Website: www.tarsus.bel.tr

Tarsus (/ˈtɑːrsəs/; Hittite: 𒋫𒅈𒊭 Tārša; Greek: Ταρσός Tarsós; Armenian: Տարսոն Tarson; Arabic: طَرسُوس Ṭarsūs) is a municipality and district of Mersin Province, Turkey. Its area is 2,029 km^{2}, and its population is 350,732 (2022). It is a historic city, 20 km (12 miles) inland from the Mediterranean Sea. It is part of the Adana-Mersin metropolitan area, the fourth-largest metropolitan area in Turkey. Tarsus forms an administrative district in the eastern part of Mersin Province and lies at the heart of the Çukurova region.

With a history going back over 6,000 years, Tarsus has long been an important stop for traders and a focal point of many civilisations. During the Roman Empire, it was the capital of the province of Cilicia. It was the scene of the first meeting between Mark Antony and Cleopatra, and the birthplace of Paul the Apostle.

Tarsus was served by Adana Şakirpaşa Airport, replaced in August 2024 by Çukurova International Airport; and is connected by Turkish State Railways to both Adana and Mersin.

== Etymology ==
The ancient name Tarsos is derived from Tarsa, the original name given to the city by the Hittites, who were among the earliest settlers of the region. That in turn was possibly derived from the name of the storm god Tarḫunz. During the Hellenistic era Tarsus was known as Antiochia on the Cydnus (Greek: Αντιόχεια του Κύδνου, Latin: Antiochia ad Cydnum), to distinguish it from Syrian Antioch. The Romans knew it as Juliopolis, while it was Darson in Western Armenian and Tarson in Eastern Armenian.

According to the Suda, the city was founded by Perseus after he fought the Isaurians and the Cilicians. An oracle told him to found a city in the place where the flat (ταρσός) of his foot would touch the earth while he was dismounting from his horse after the victory.

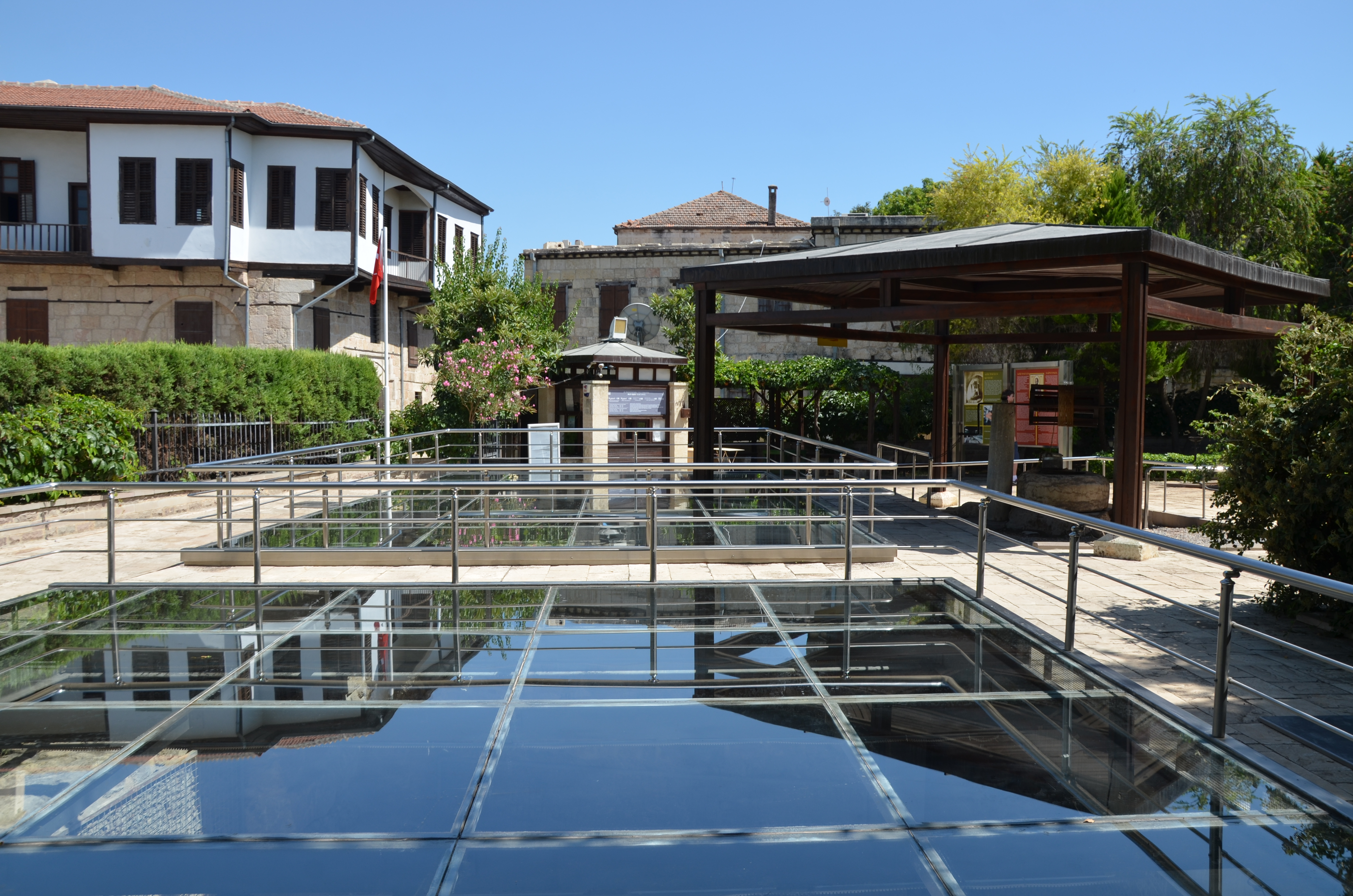
St. Paul's Well in Tarsus, Cilicia

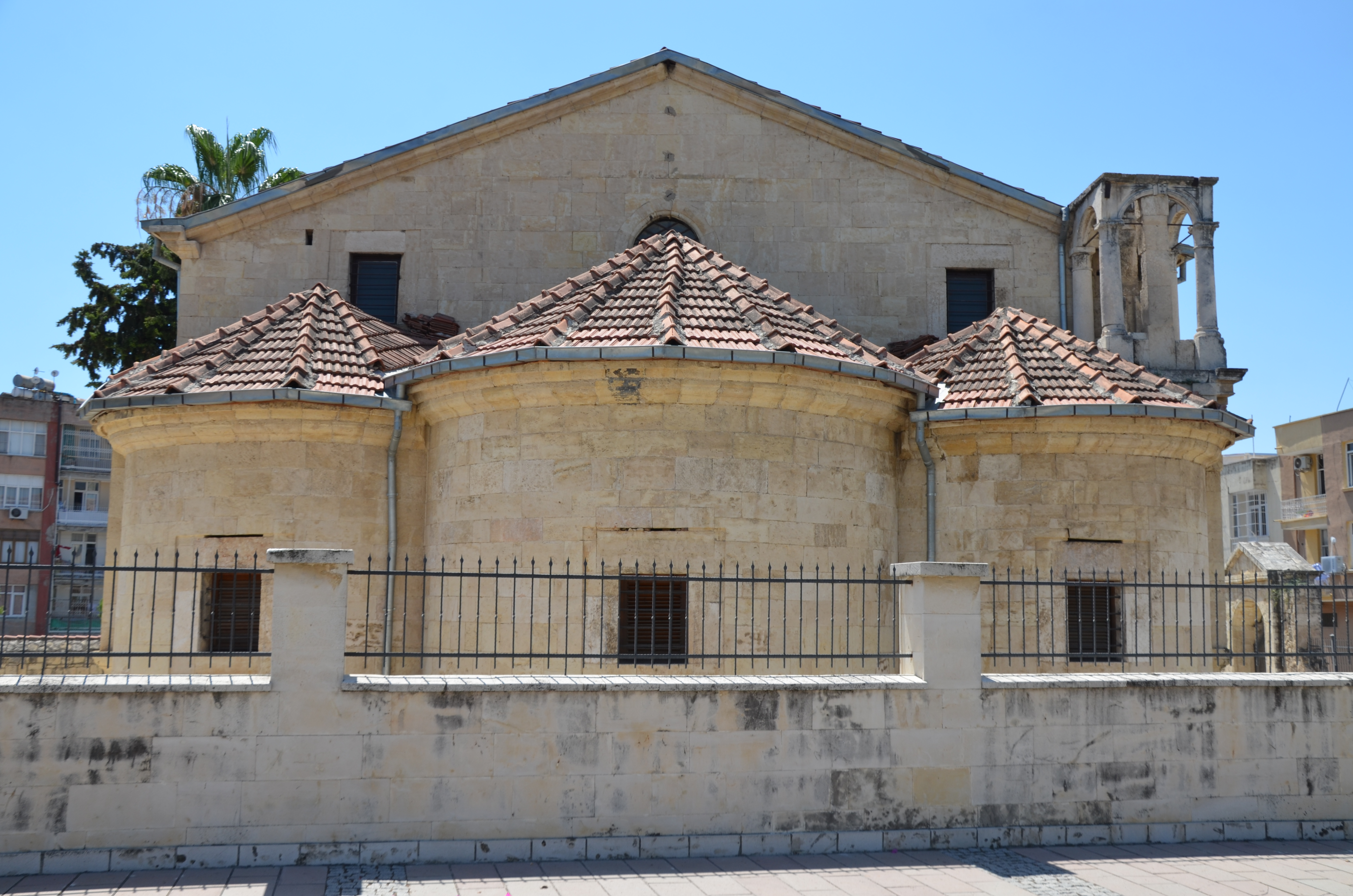
St. Paul's Church

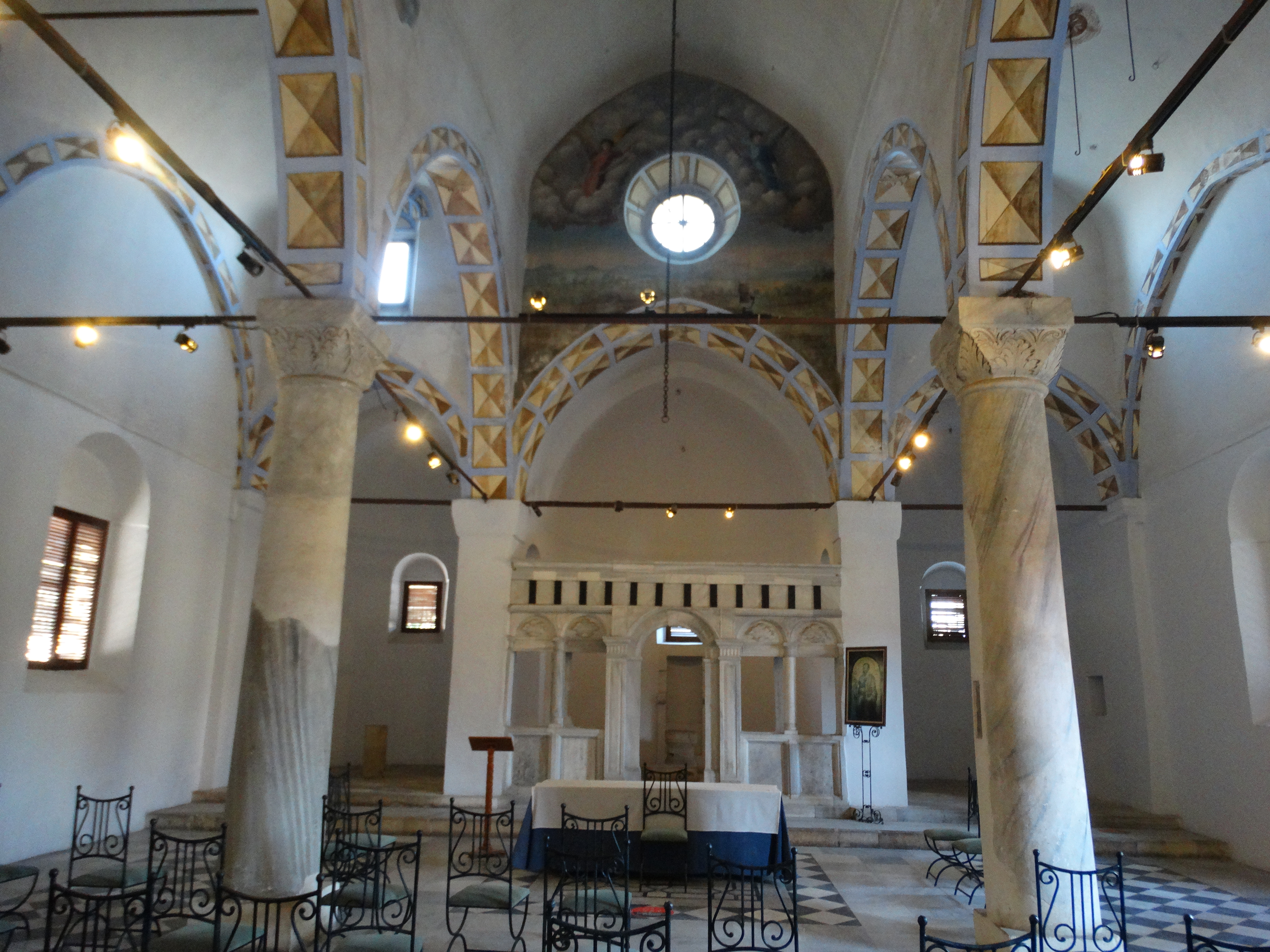
Interior of Saint Paul's Church

== Geography ==
Located on the mouth of the Berdan River (Cydnus in antiquity), which empties into the Mediterranean, Tarsus sits at a junction where land and sea routes connecting the Cilician plain (today called Çukurova), central Anatolia and the Mediterranean Sea meet. The climate is typical of the Mediterranean region, with very hot, humid summers and chilly, damp winters.

Tarsus has a long history of commerce, and is still a commercial centre today, trading in the produce of the fertile Çukurova plain. Tarsus is also a thriving industrial centre for refining and processing for export. Industries include agricultural machinery, spare parts, textiles, fruit-processing, brick-making and ceramics.

Agriculture is an important source of income with half the local land area farmland (1,050 km^{2} [410 sq mi]) and most of the remainder forest or orchard. The farmland is mostly well-irrigated, fertilised and managed with up-to-date equipment.

== History ==
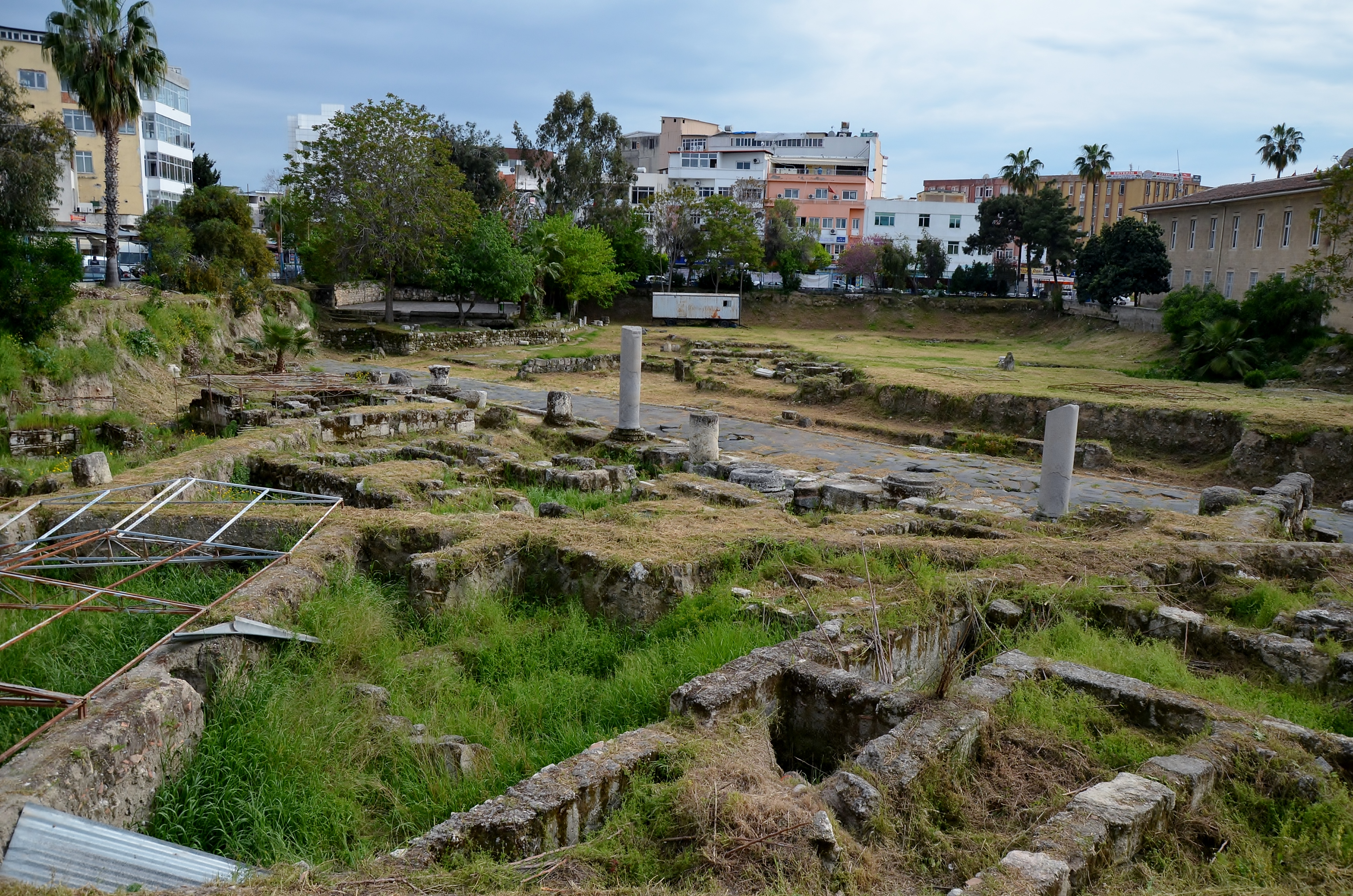
Roman road in Tarsus

=== Foundation and prehistory ===
Archaeological evidence suggests Gözlükule, a mound located in southeastern Tarsus, was the site where humans first settled in the area. Excavations conducted under Princeton University archaeologist Hetty Goldman in the 1930s and 1940s at the mound found evidence that the site was occupied from Neolithic to Islamic times. A fortified town existed at the site of Tarsus since at least as early as the 3rd millennium BC.

The settlement stood at the crossing of several important trade routes linking Anatolia to Syria and beyond. Because most of the ruins lie under the modern city, archaeology has barely touched the ancient city. As an important port in a merchant marine trade network spanning the eastern Mediterranean and beyond from before the third millennium, the city was always an important centre for cultural interchange with traces of its influence visible from pre-Homeric Greek evidence onwards. The city may have been of Anatolian or Semitic origin; it is first mentioned as Tarsisi in Neo-Assyrian records of the campaigns of Esarhaddon, as well as several times in the records of Shalmaneser I and Sennacherib, the latter having had the city rebuilt. A Greek legend connects it with the memory of the Assyrian king Sardanapalus (Ashurbanipal), still preserved in the Dunuk-Tach, called 'tomb of Sardanapalus', a monument of unknown origin. During the Hellenistic era it was a centre for exchange between Neo-Platonic, Gnostic and Mystery traditions.

Stephanus of Byzantium quotes Athenodorus of Tarsus on another legend:

Anchiale, daughter of Iapetus, founded Anchiale (a city near Tarsus): her son was Cydnus, who gave his name to the river at Tarsus: the son of Cydnus was Parthenius, from whom the city was called Parthenia: afterwards the name was changed to Tarsus.

Much of this legendary account of the foundation of Tarsus, however, appeared in the Roman era, and it is not reliable. The geographer Strabo states that Tarsus was founded by people from Argos who were exploring this coast. Another legend claims that Bellerophon fell off his winged horse Pegasus here, hurting his foot in the process, and that the city was named tar-sos (the sole of the foot) in memory of his accident. Other candidates for legendary founder of the city include the hero Perseus and Triptolemus, son of the earth-goddess Demeter, doubtless because the countryside around Tarsus is such good farmland. Later the coins of Tarsus bore the image of Hercules due to another tale in which the hero was held prisoner here by the local god Sandon. Tarsus has been suggested as a possible site for the biblical Tarshish, to which the prophet Jonah wanted to flee, but Tartessos in Spain has also been offered as a possible location for this. (See further)

=== Early antiquity ===
In historical times, the city was first ruled by the Hittites, followed by Assyria, and then by the Persian Empire. As the principal town of Cilicia, Tarsus was the seat of a Persian satrapy from 400 BC onward. Indeed, Xenophon records that in 401 BC, when Cyrus the Younger marched against Babylon, the city was governed by King Syennesis in the name of the Persian monarch.

At this period the god of the city was Sandon, of whom a large monument existed at Tarsus at least until the 3rd century AD. Coins showed Sandon standing on a winged and horned lion, and it is now thought likely that the Lion of Saint Mark on the pillar in the Piazza San Marco in Venice was in origin a winged lion-griffin copied from such a monument in Tarsus.

Alexander the Great passed through with his army in 333 BC and nearly met his death here after bathing in the Cydnus. By this time Tarsus was already largely influenced by Greek language and culture, and as part of the Seleucid Empire it became more and more Hellenised. Strabo praised the cultural level of Tarsus in this period with its philosophers, poets and linguists. The schools of Tarsus rivalled those of Athens and Alexandria. A reference in the Bible (2 Maccabees (4:30)) records the city's revolt against Antiochus IV Epiphanes in about 171 BC. The king had renamed the town Antiochia on the Cydnus although the name did not stick because too many cities were named Antioch. At this time the library of Tarsus held 200,000 books, including a huge collection of scientific works.

=== Roman period ===
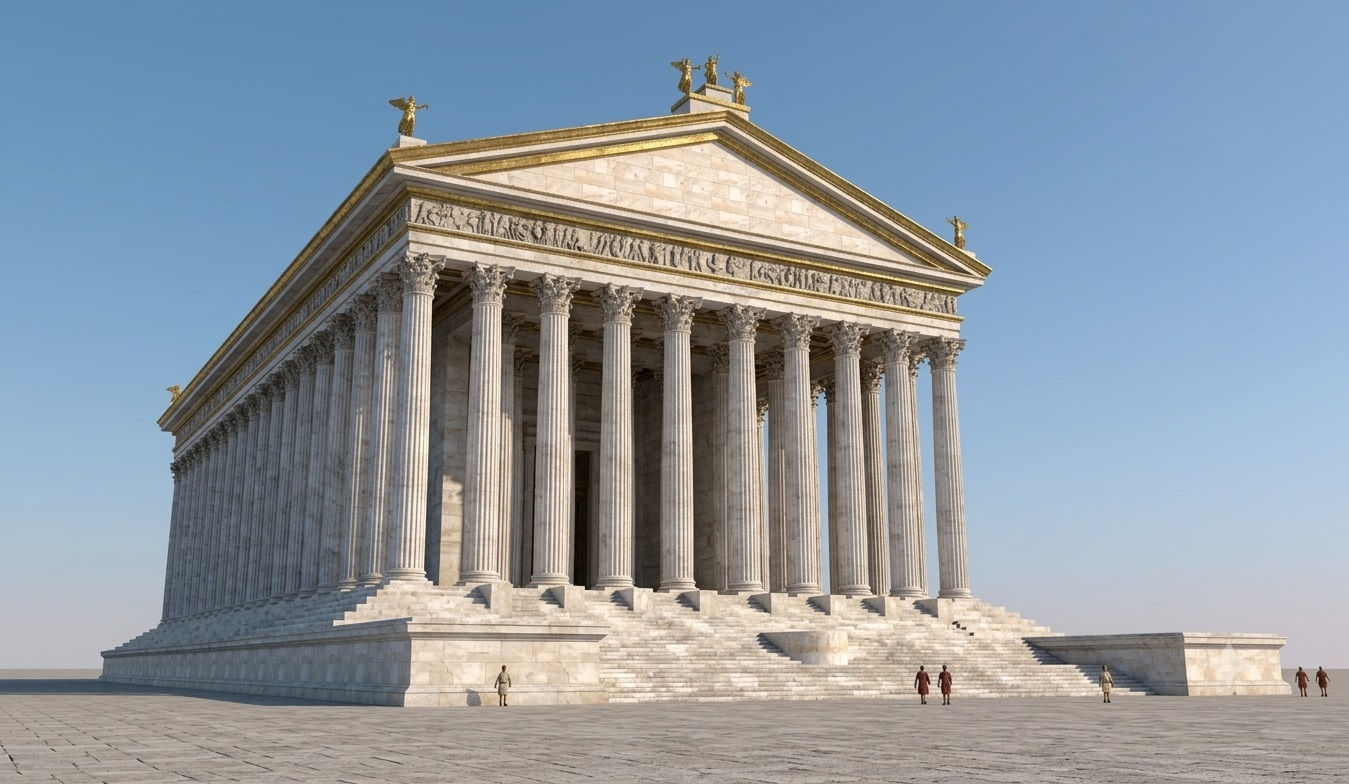
The huge Temple of Tarsus, one of the largest and most important in antiquity

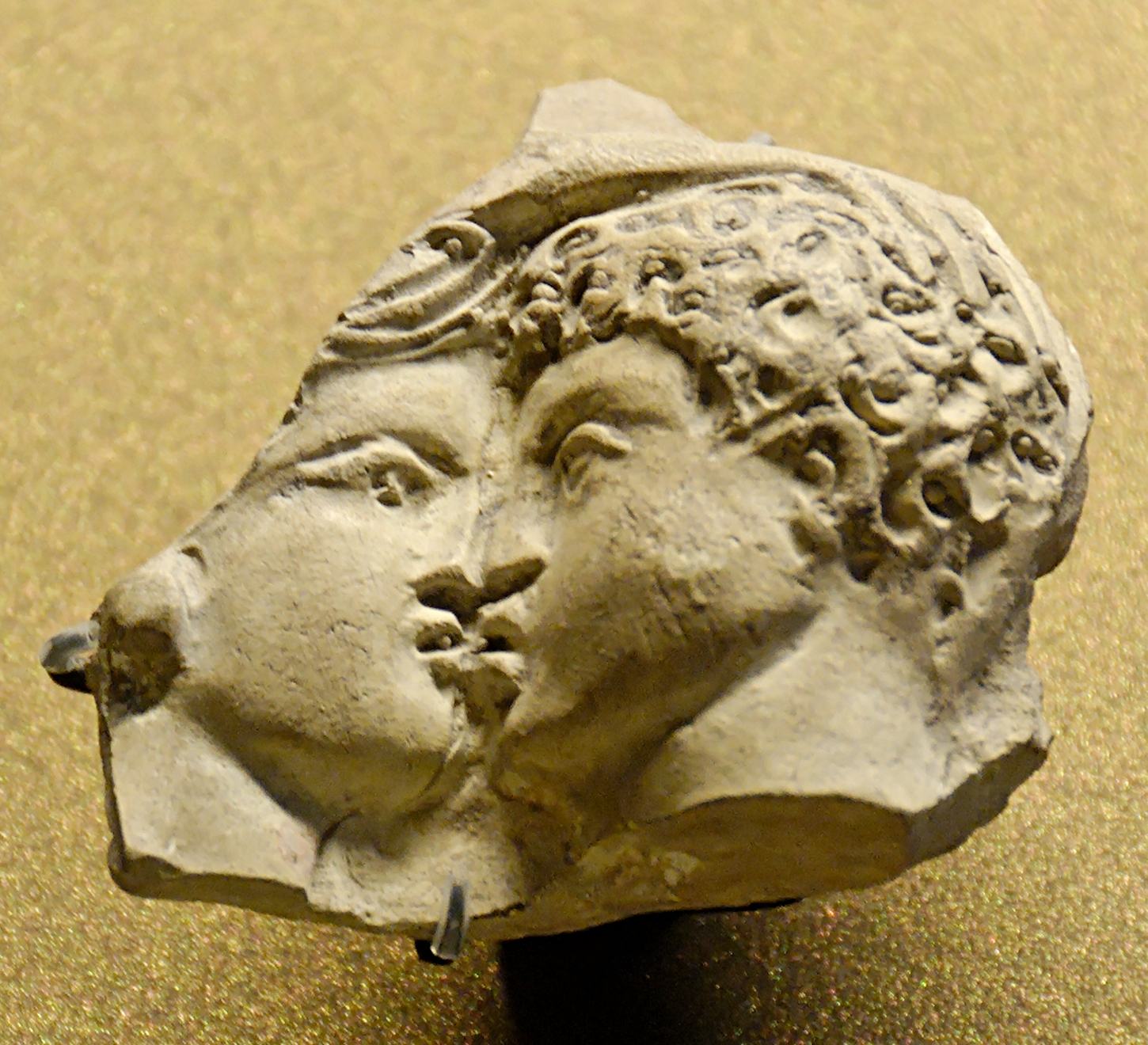
Oscillum depicting a couple kissing. Terracotta figurine made in Tarsus, Roman Era.

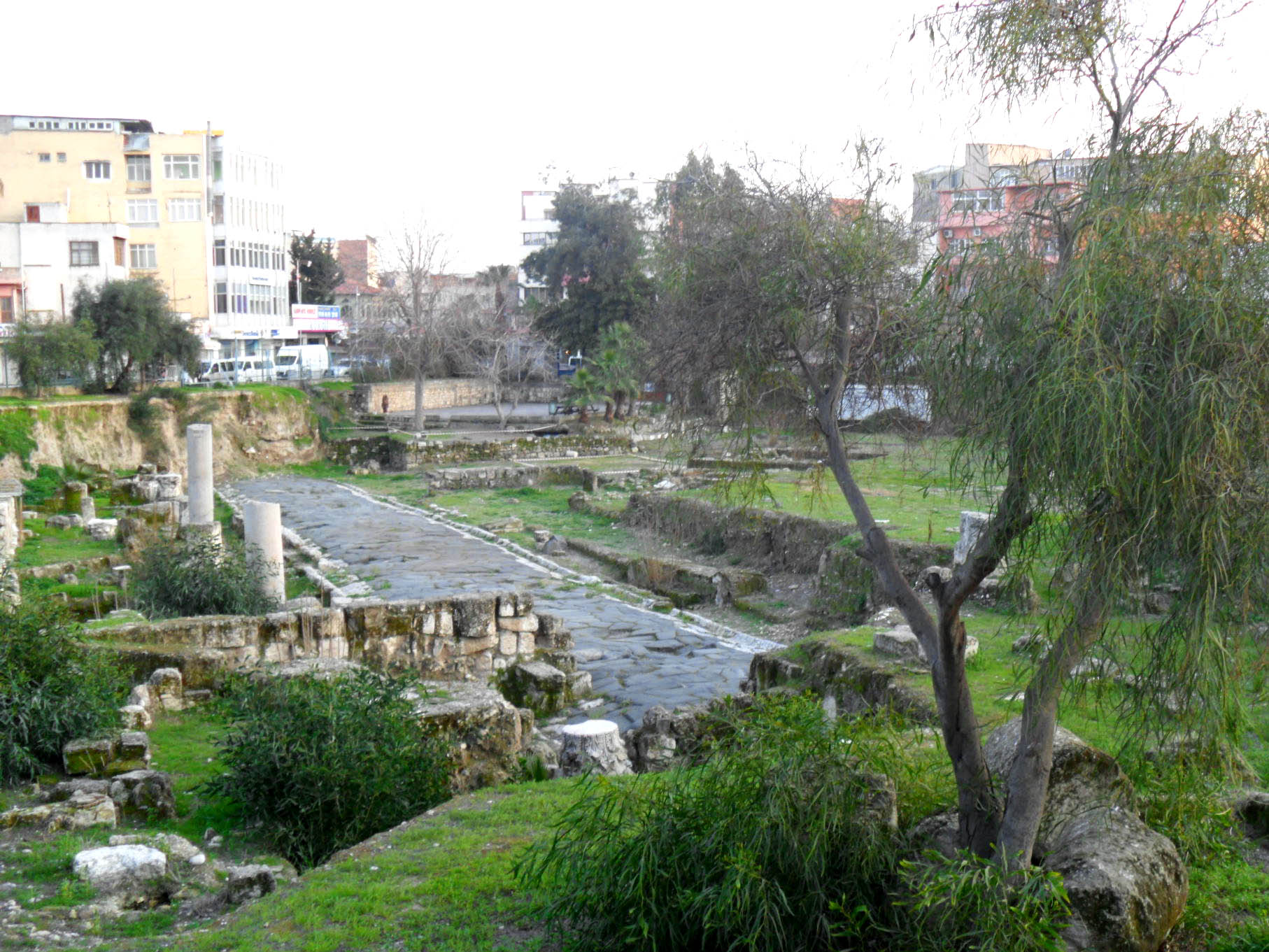
Roman road in Tarsus

After crushing the feared Cilician pirates, Pompey brought Tarsus under Roman rule In 67 BC, and it became the capital of the Roman province of Cilicia. To flatter Julius Caesar, it was briefly named Juliopolis. Cassius Longinus planned to kill him here as early as 47 BC, and Cleopatra and Mark Antony met and was the scene of the celebrated feasts they gave during the construction of their fleet (41 BC). In William Shakespeare's 1606 play Antony and Cleopatra (Act 5, Scene 2) Cleopatra says she is going to Cydnus to meet Antony after his death, (i.e. she will commit suicide to meet him in the afterlife). "Go fetch / My best attires: I am again for Cydnus, / To meet Mark Antony."

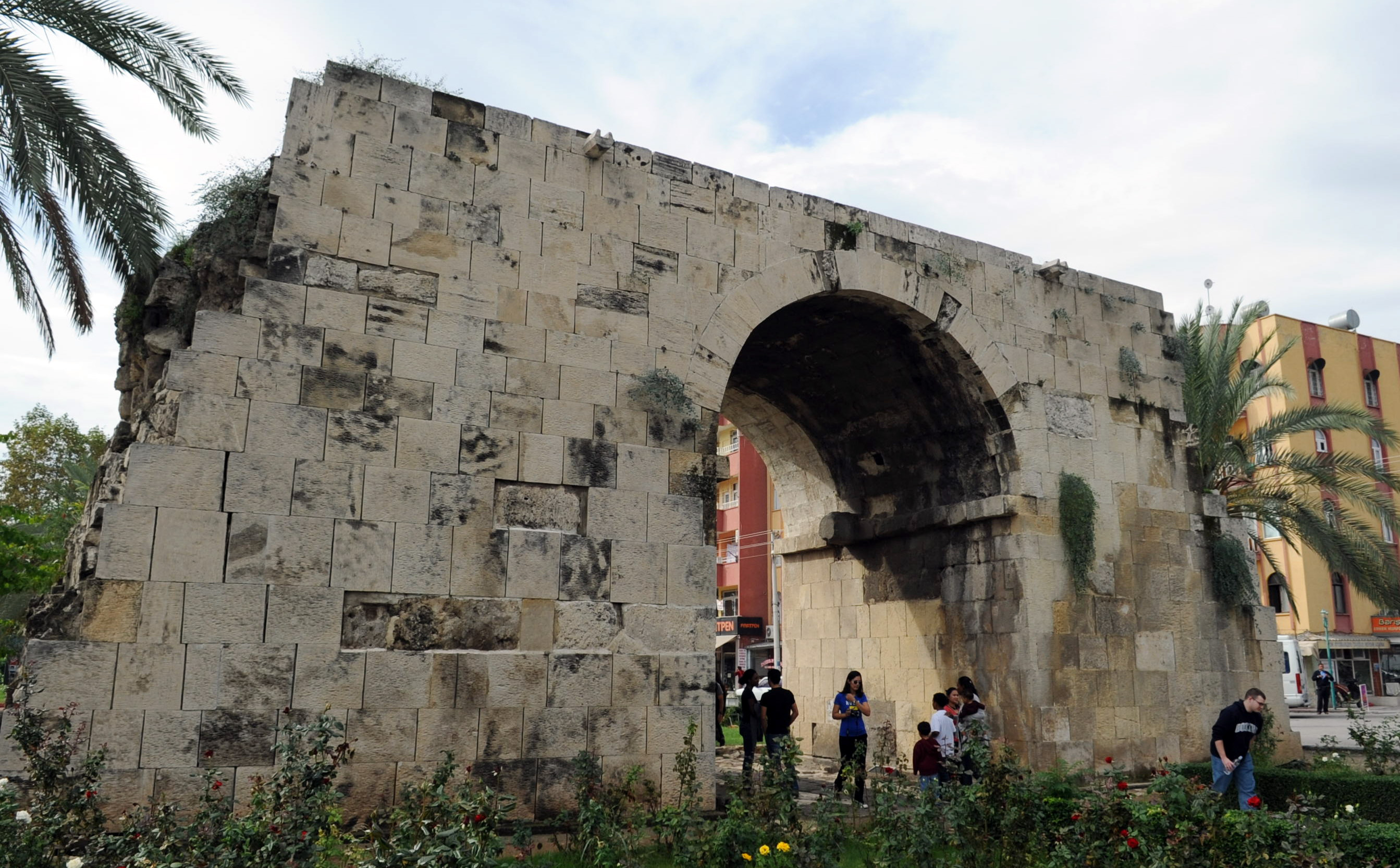
Cleopatra's Gate in Tarsus

In the Roman period, the city was an important intellectual centre, boasting its own academy. One of its leading lights, the philosopher Athenodorus Cananites, was the tutor of the first Roman emperor, Augustus, a fact which secured continuous imperial patronage for the city.

When the province of Cilicia was divided, Tarsus remained the civil and religious metropolis of Cilicia Prima, a grand city with palaces, marketplaces, roads and bridges, baths, fountains and waterworks, a gymnasium on the banks of the Cydnus, and a stadium. Tarsus was later eclipsed by nearby Adana but remained important as a port and shipyard. Several Roman emperors were interred here: Marcus Claudius Tacitus, Maximinus II and Julian the Apostate, who planned to move his capital here from Antioch if he returned from his Persian expedition.

=== Early Christian and Byzantine eras ===
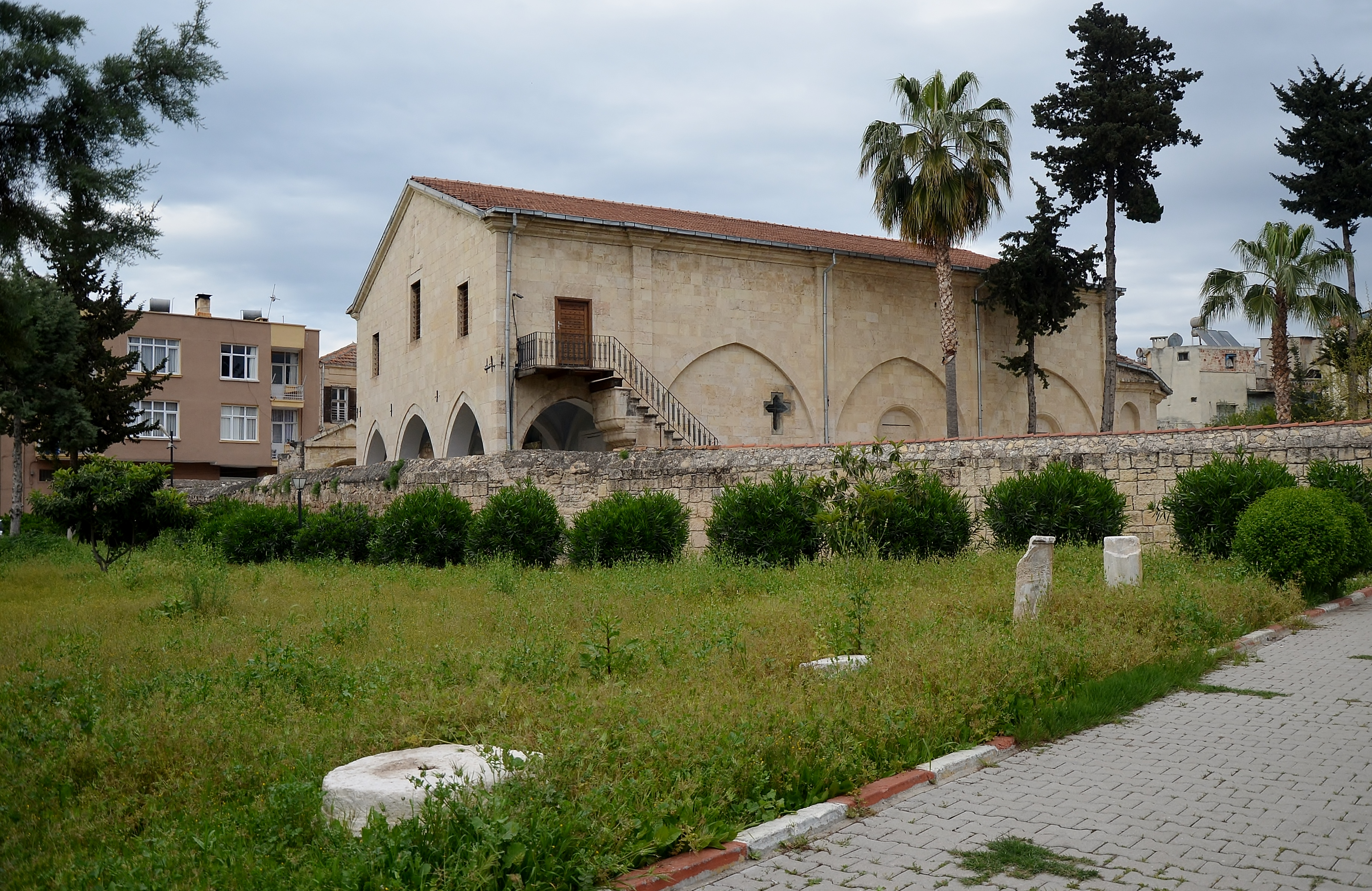
Church of St. Paul in Tarsus (the church and its surroundings are on the UN World Heritage tentative list)

Tarsus was the city where, according to the Acts of the Apostles, Saul of Tarsus was born, although he was brought up in Jerusalem. He was a Roman citizen (Acts 21:39; Acts 22:25–29) "of Tarsus, a city in Cilicia, a citizen of no mean city". Scholars largely agree that Paul was from Tarsus and was a Roman citizen, as stated in Acts. Saul, who eventually became Paul the Apostle after his professed encounter with Jesus (Acts 9:11,21:39,22:3), returned here after his conversion (Acts 9:30). About eight years later, Barnabas retrieved him from Tarsus to help with the work of preaching and teaching in Syrian Antioch (Acts 11:25).

By then, a Christian community probably already existed although the first recorded bishop, Helenus, dates only from the 3rd century. Owing to the importance of Tarsus, many martyrs were put to death there, including Saint Pelagia of Tarsus, Saint Boniface of Tarsus, Saint Marinus of Tarsus, Saint Diomedes, Saint Quiricus and Saint Julitta.

The city remained largely pagan until the reign of Julian the Apostate (r. 361–363), who reportedly planned to make it his capital. Following his death during his campaign against Sassanid Persia, he was buried next to the city walls, opposite the earlier tomb of the Tetrarch Maximinus Daza. In the early 5th century, Christian chronicler Palladius recorded the presence of Samaritan and Jewish synagogues in Tarsus (407/408 CE). Under Emperor Justinian I (r. 527–565), public works were carried out in the city, including alterations to the course of the Cydnus river and the rebuilding of the bridge. Towards the end of his reign, the city suffered from riots instigated by the Hippodrome Blues faction.

A cave near Tarsus is one of several places said to be the location of the legend of the Seven Sleepers, common to Christianity and Islam.

=== Middle Ages ===
Following the Muslim conquest of the Levant in the 630s, the city came into contact with the forces of the Rashidun Caliphate. It is unclear when the town was first captured by the Arabs, but it is clear that it, and the wider region of Cilicia, remained contested between the Byzantines and the new Caliphate for several decades, up to the early 8th century. According to Muslim sources, as he was retreating the Byzantine emperor Heraclius (r. 610–641) deliberately withdrew the population and devastated the region between Antioch and Tarsus, creating a no man's land between the two empires.

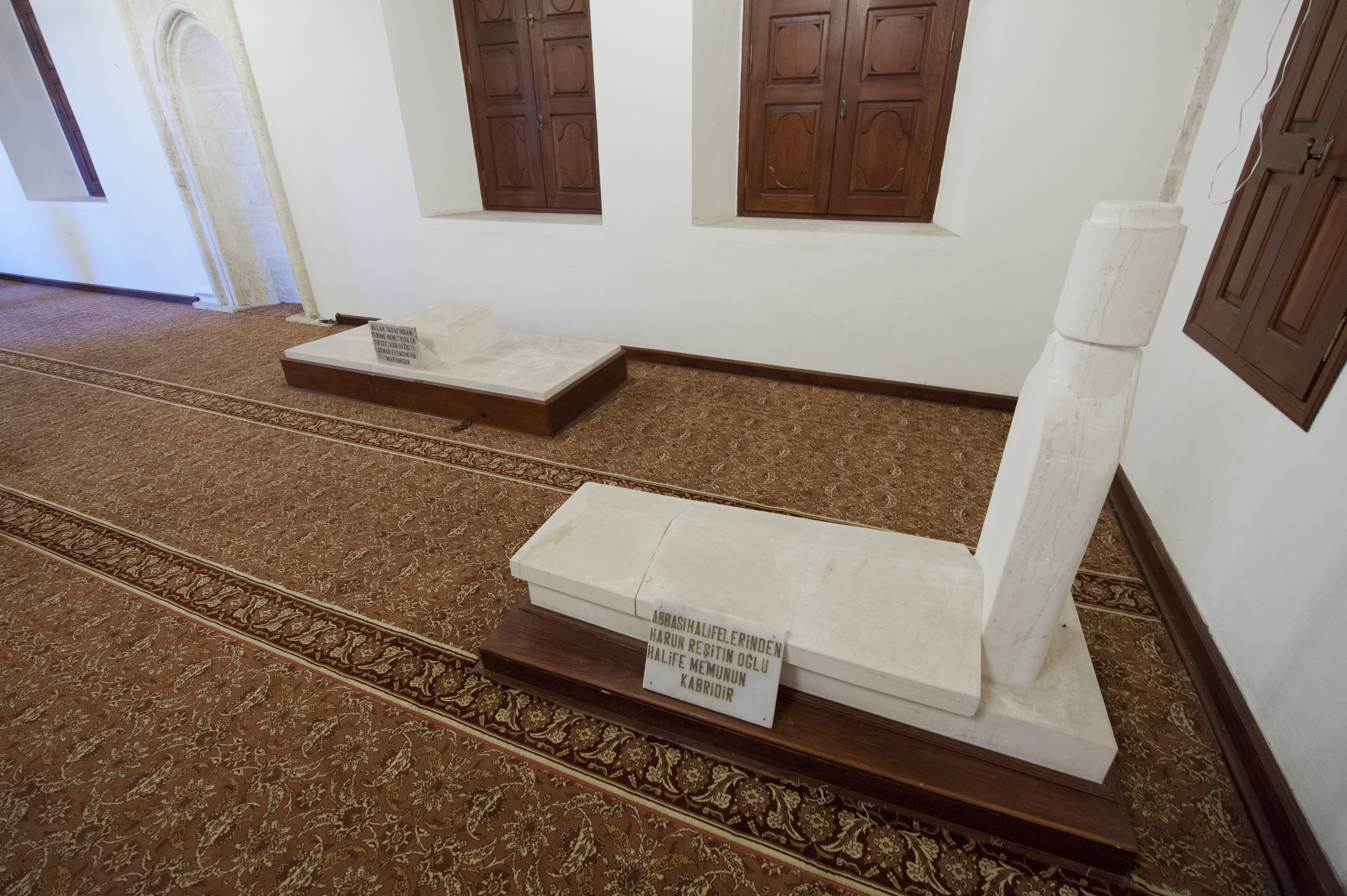
Tomb of Al-Ma'mun in Tarsus Grand Mosque

It was not until the early Abbasid period that Tarsus, by then lying in ruins, was reoccupied and refortified, this time as an advance strongpoint within the fortified zone of the al-ʿAwāṣim, stretching from Tarsus northeast to Malatya, and as an assembly point for expeditions against the Byzantine Empire. The first attempt was undertaken by al-Hasan ibn Qahtaba al-Ta'i in 778/9 but was apparently unsuccessful and the city was not fully restored until 787/8, by Abu Sulaym Faraj on the orders of Caliph Harun al-Rashid (r. 786–809). Three thousand Khurasanis and 2,000 Syrians (a thousand each from Antioch and al-Massisa) were given houses and land in the new fortress city. Tarsus was apparently recovered by the Byzantines soon after, at some point around the turn of the century. The city probably remained in Byzantine hands during the Abbasid civil war of the Fourth Fitna, but returned to Muslim control by 830 when Caliph al-Ma'mun (r. 813–833) recommenced offensive campaigns against Byzantium using the city as a base.

Henceforth and until the Byzantine reconquest in the 10th century, Tarsus was one of the main centres for the holy war (jihād) against Byzantium, comprising annual raids (ṣawāʿif) into Byzantine lands through the Cilician Gates when the mountain snows had melted and passage was possible. These raids were mounted by the local garrisons, maintained by the taxation not only of the frontier zone of the al-ʿAwāṣim but also by generous subsidies from the caliphal government, and large numbers of volunteer warriors of the faith (mujahidun or ghazis). Tarsus remained under direct Abbasid control until 878/9, when it and the wider Cilician border zone were given to the autonomous ruler of Egypt, Ahmad ibn Tulun. The local governor Yazaman al-Khadim returned the city to the direct allegiance of Baghdad from 882 on, but was forced to recognise the Tulunids again in 890. Tulunid possession of the border zone lasted until the death of Ibn Tulun's heir Khumarawayh in 896, after which Caliph al-Mu'tadid (r. 892–902) re-asserted direct control. The area remained under Abbasid rule for the next four decades. After a brief period when the border zone was under Ikhshidid control, in 946/7, Tarsus recognised the overlordship of the Hamdanid emir Sayf al-Dawla of Aleppo, who had become the new master of northern Syria and the Byzantine borderlands. Facing a resurgent Byzantium, he was able to stem the tide for a while, but in 965, the Byzantine emperor Nikephoros II Phokas (r. 963–969) captured the city, ending Muslim rule there. Throughout this period, the governors of Tarsus also operated an active mint in the city.

The terms of the city's surrender allowed any Muslim who wished to leave with as many of his possessions as he could carry. Many of those who left eventually settled, according to al-Muqaddasi, at Baniyas. Most of those who remained behind became Christians and the main mosque was either torn down or turned into a stable. The city remained under Byzantine rule until 1085. It was thereafter disputed between Latin Crusaders, Byzantines (1137–1172), Seljuk Turks and the Armenians of the Armenian Kingdom of Cilicia (Kingdom of Lesser Armenia). The city was the capital of the Armenian Kingdom of Cilicia between 1080 and 1198. The Armenians became definitive masters until about 1359 when the city was captured by the Ramadanid Emirate and Mamluk Sultanate. Finally, the area was brought under the control of the Ottoman Empire by Selim I in 1516.

In the Middle Ages, Tarsus was renowned throughout the Middle East; a number of Arab writers praised it as a beautiful and well-defended city, its walls having two layers of fortifications with five gates and earthworks outside, surrounded by rich farmland and watered by the river and the lake.

=== Ottoman and modern period ===
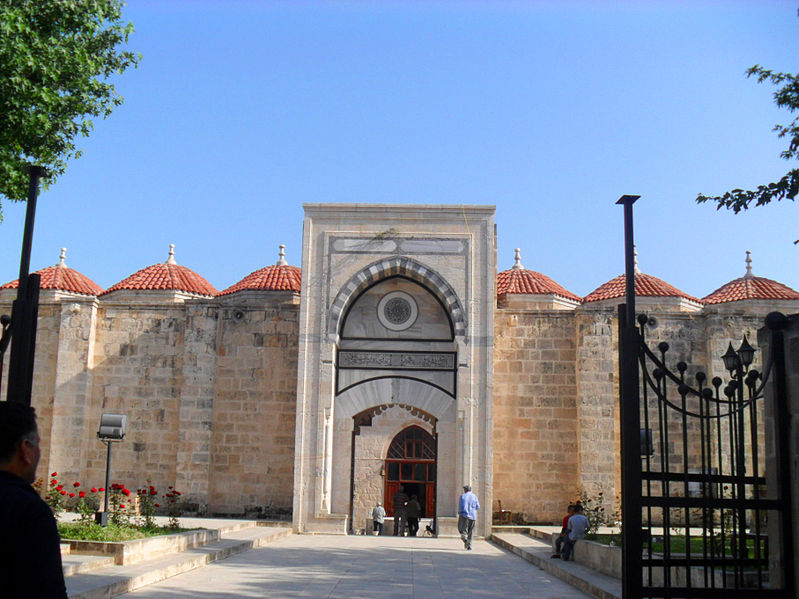
Tarsus Grand Mosque (Ulu Cami)

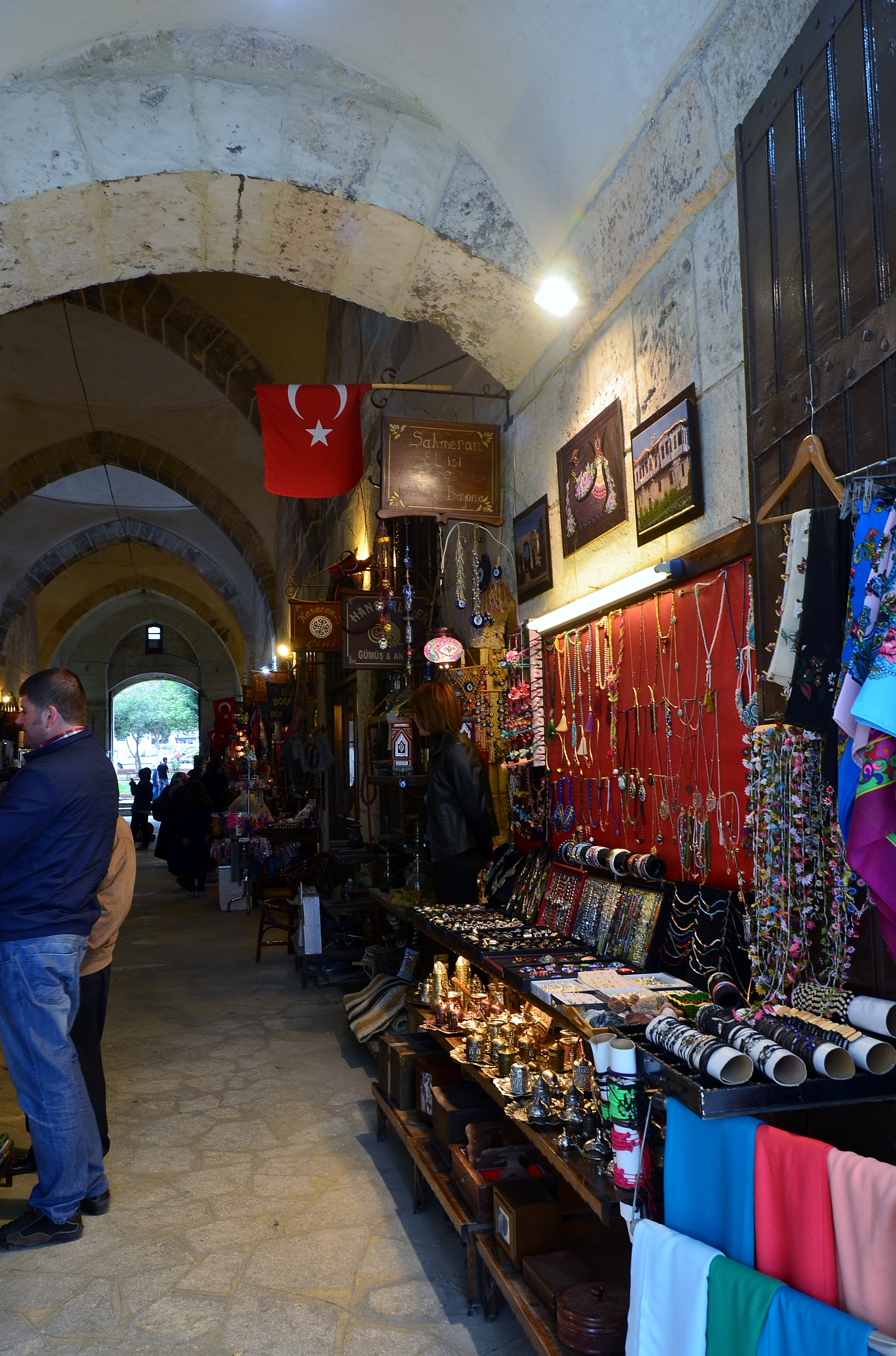
Kırkkaşık (Forty Teaspoons) Bazaar

Under Ottoman rule, Tarsus initially formed part of the Eyalet of Aleppo. After the Ottoman conquest of Cyprus in 1571 it became the seat of a sanjak (sub-province) within the Cyprus Eyalet, before being transferred in 1608 to the sanjak of Adana as a kaza (district).

Visiting in 1671 the traveller Evliya Çelebi recorded "a city on the plain, an hour from the sea, surrounded by strong walls two-storeys high, moated on all sides, with three distinct neighbourhoods inside the walls".

Despite its excellent defences, Tarsus was captured from the Ottomans in 1832 by the Egyptian army of Ibrahim Pasha of Egypt, son of Muhammad Ali, and remained for eight years in Egyptian hands. The Egyptians began growing cotton on the surrounding plain. Following the return of Ottoman rule this cotton drove substantial growth in the local economy, due to increased world demand for the crop during shortages caused by the U.S. Civil War. A new road was built to the port in Mersin and the city of Tarsus grew and thrived. Still today many large houses in the city stand as reminders of the wealth generated during this period.

However, after 3,000 years as a flourishing port, by the end of the 19th century neglect meant Tarsus lost its access to the sea as the delta became a swamp. At this point it was a typical Ottoman city with communities of Muslim Turks, Christian Greeks and Armenians. With the founding of the Turkish Republic in the 1920s, the swamp was drained and the River Berdan was dammed to build Turkey's first hydro-electric power station. Irrigation, roadworks and a railway brought the economy of Tarsus back to life, with new factories particularly producing textiles.

== Composition ==
There are 180 neighbourhoods in Tarsus District:

- 82 Evler
- Ağzıdelik
- Akarsu
- Akçakocalı
- Akgedik
- Akşemsettin
- Aladağ
- Aliağa
- Alibeyli
- Aliefendioğlu
- Alifakı
- Altaylılar
- Anıt
- Ardıçlı
- Arıklı
- Atalar
- Atatürk
- Avadan
- Bağlar
- Baharlı
- Bahçe
- Bahşiş
- Ballıca
- Baltalı
- Barbaros
- Belen
- Beydeğirmeni
- Beylice
- Boğazpınar
- Böğrüeğri
- Bolatlı
- Boztepe
- Büyükkösebalcı
- Çağbaşı
- Çağlayan
- Çakırlı
- Çamalan
- Camilimanda
- Caminur
- Çamtepe
- Çatalca
- Çavdarlı
- Çavuşlu
- Çevreli
- Çiçekli
- Çiftlik
- Cin
- Cırbıklar
- Çiriştepe
- Çokak
- Çöplü
- Çukurbağ
- Cumhuriyet
- Dadalı
- Damlama
- Dedeler
- Dorak
- Duatepe
- Egemen
- Eminlik
- Emirler
- Ergenekon
- Esenler
- Eskiömerli
- Eskişehir
- Fahrettinpaşa
- Fatih
- Ferahimşalvuz
- Fevzi Çakmak
- Gaziler
- Gazipaşa
- Girne
- Göçük
- Gömmece
- Gözlükule
- Gülek
- Günyurdu
- Hacıbozan
- Hacıhamzalı
- Halitağa
- Hasanağa
- Heleke
- Hürriyet
- İbrişim
- İncirgediği
- İncirlikuyu
- İnköy
- İsmetpaşa
- Kaburgediği
- Kadelli
- Kaklıktaşı
- Kaleburcu
- Kanberhüyüğü
- Karaçerçili
- Karadiken
- Karadirlik
- Karakütük
- Karayayla
- Kargılı
- Karsavran
- Kavaklı
- Kayadibi
- Kefeli
- Kelahmet
- Kemalpaşa
- Kerimler
- Keşli
- Kırıt
- Kırklarsırtı
- Kızılçukur
- Kızılmurat
- Kocaköy
- Koçmarlı
- Konaklar
- Körlü Beyi
- Kösebalcı
- Köselerli
- Kozoluk
- Kulak
- Kumdere
- Kurbanlı
- Kurtçukuru
- Kuşçular
- Kütüklü
- Mahmutağa
- Mantaş
- Meşelik
- Mithatpaşa
- Muratlı
- Nemiroğlu
- Öğretmenler
- Olukkoyağı
- Özbek
- Özlüce
- Pirömerli
- Reşadiye
- Sağlıklı
- Şahin
- Sandal
- Sanlıca
- Sarıveli
- Sayköy
- Şehit Kerim
- Şehit Mustafa
- Şehitishak
- Şehitler Tepesi
- Simithacılı
- Sıraköy
- Sucular
- Takbaş
- Taşçılı
- Taşkuyu
- Taşobası
- Tekeliören
- Tekke
- Tepeçaylak
- Tepeköy
- Tepetaşpınar
- Topaklı
- Topçu
- Tozkoparanzahit
- Ulaş
- Verimli
- Yalamık
- Yanıkkışla
- Yaramış
- Yarbay Şemsettin
- Yazlık
- Yeni Ömerli
- Yeniçay
- Yenice
- Yeniköy
- Yenimahalle
- Yeşilevler
- Yeşilmahalle
- Yeşiltepe
- Yeşilyurt
- Yüksek
- Yunusemre
- Yunusoğlu

== Cuisine ==
The distinctive local cuisine includes chargrilled chicken, hummus (sometimes heated and served with pastırma), şalgam, tantuni, miniature lahmacun called "fındık lahmacun", and cezerye, a dessert made from carrots.

== Sports ==
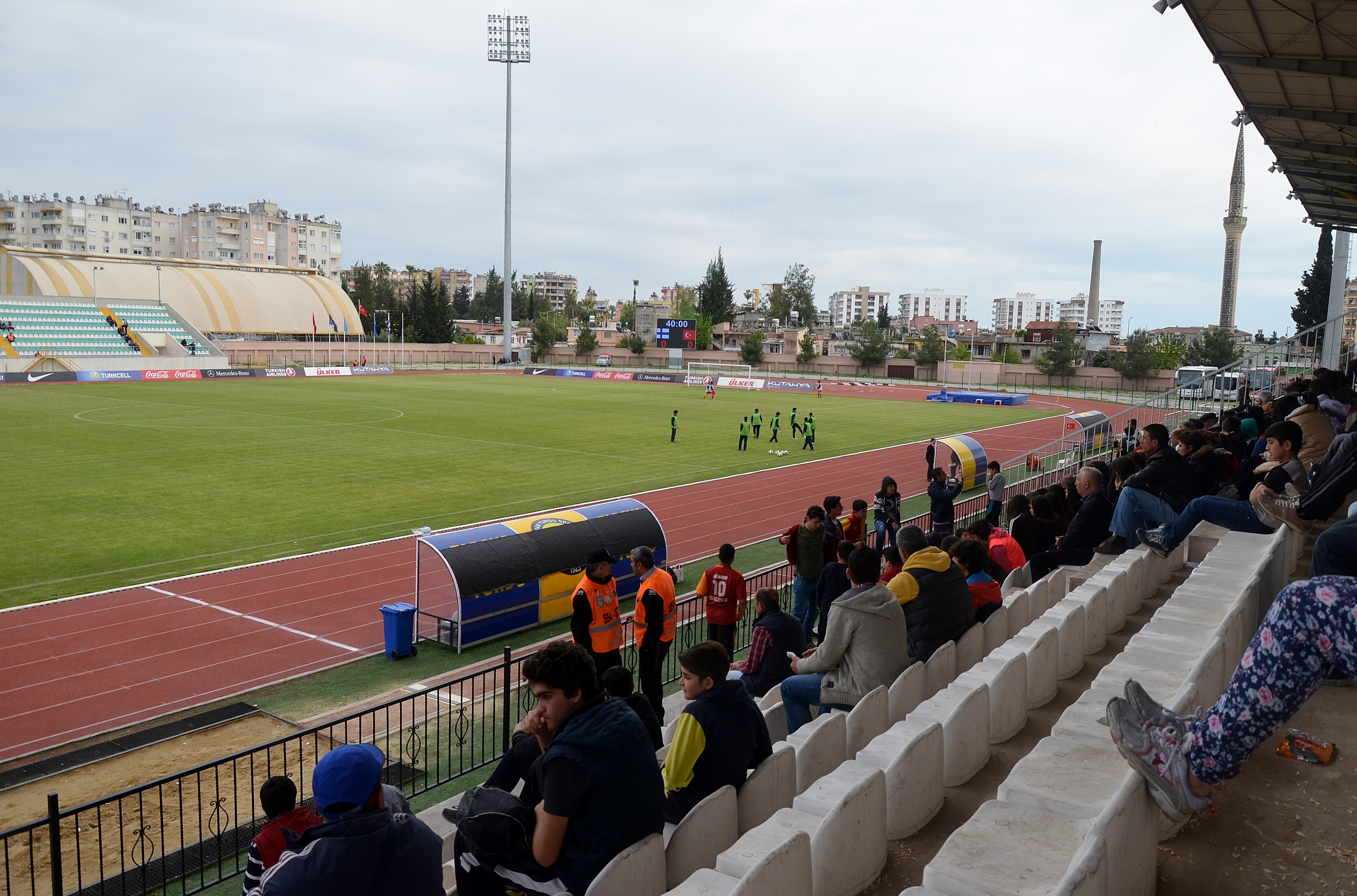
Tarsus City Stadium

Tarsus has two football stadiums, Tarsus City Stadium and Burhanettin Kocamaz Stadium, and an arena, Tarsus Arena. The local football club is Tarsus Idman Yurdu.

== Main sites ==
Tarsus city centre is home to the magnificent homes of wealthy traders, some of them restored, some still waiting a saviour. Additionally it is home to several historic sites although some are in need of restoration and research. These sites have been described by travellers for well over a century. For instance Blackwood's Magazine (Edinburgh) in 1890, and H. V. Morton's In the Steps of St Paul in 1936.

The best known include:

- Cleopatra's Gate – to the west of the city, the only ancient city gate still standing, where Antony and Cleopatra entered the city in 41 BC, though the "restoration" of this structure has covered much of it with shiny new stone (see for a picture of the gate before the work was done).
- Roman bridge of Justinian over the Berdan River. It remains in good condition.
- Tarsus Museum, containing many ancient coins and a severed mummified arm
- Roman road north of Tarsus
- Ancient road another Roman road in the town centre
- Kızlar Kalesi, a medieval castle ruin
- Gözlükule - slight remains of original settlement mound

Sites of religious interest and pilgrimage include:

- St. Paul's Church and well (it is a museum, but occasionally Christian services take place here).
- Mosque said to be the burial place of the Prophet Daniel.

From the Turkish period:

- Tarsus Grand Mosque (Ulu Cami), 16th-century mosque
- Kırkkaşık Bedesten covered market built in 1579
- Bilal Habeşi Masjid
- The old baths; the dark brown spots on the white marble walls are said to be the bloodstains of Shahmeran, the legendary Snake King who was killed in an ambush in the baths. (see Shahmeran Hamam)
- "Nusret (Nusrat)", the minelayer used to defend the Straits before the Battle of Gallipoli

Places of natural beauty include:

- Tarsus Waterfall
- Karabucak Forest, popular picnic place a few kilometres south of the city centre

== Notable residents ==
- Paul the Apostle (Saul of Tarsus), Christian apostle, missionary, martyr, and saint, was born here and returned for a brief period later in life.
- Antipater, Stoic philosopher
- Archedemus of Tarsus, Stoic philosopher
- Chrysippus, Stoic philosopher
- Hagnon of Tarsus, rhetor and philosopher
- Hermogenes of Tarsus, rhetor
- Zeno of Tarsus, philosopher
- Saints Cyricus and Julitta
- Saint Nerses of Lambron, Archbishop of Tarsus in the Armenian Kingdom of Cilicia
- Saint Theodore of Tarsus, Archbishop of Canterbury
- Cicero, is believed to have resided in Tarsus while he was the governor of Cilicia
- Oral Çalışlar, journalist
- Ümit Yaşar Oğuzcan, poet and author
- Former CEO of the Coca-Cola Company, Muhtar Kent, graduated from Tarsus American College
- Emine Ülker Tarhan, former judge and politician
- Mehmet Emin Karamehmet, chairman of Çukurova Holding
- Manuş Baba, singer
- Tuğba Şenoğlu, volleyball player
- Derya Cebecioğlu, volleyball player
- Ali Mahir Başarır, politician and lawyer

== International relations ==
Tarsus is twinned with:

- Langen, Germany
- Muğla, Turkey
- Antalya, Turkey
- Akanthou, Northern Cyprus

== Gallery ==
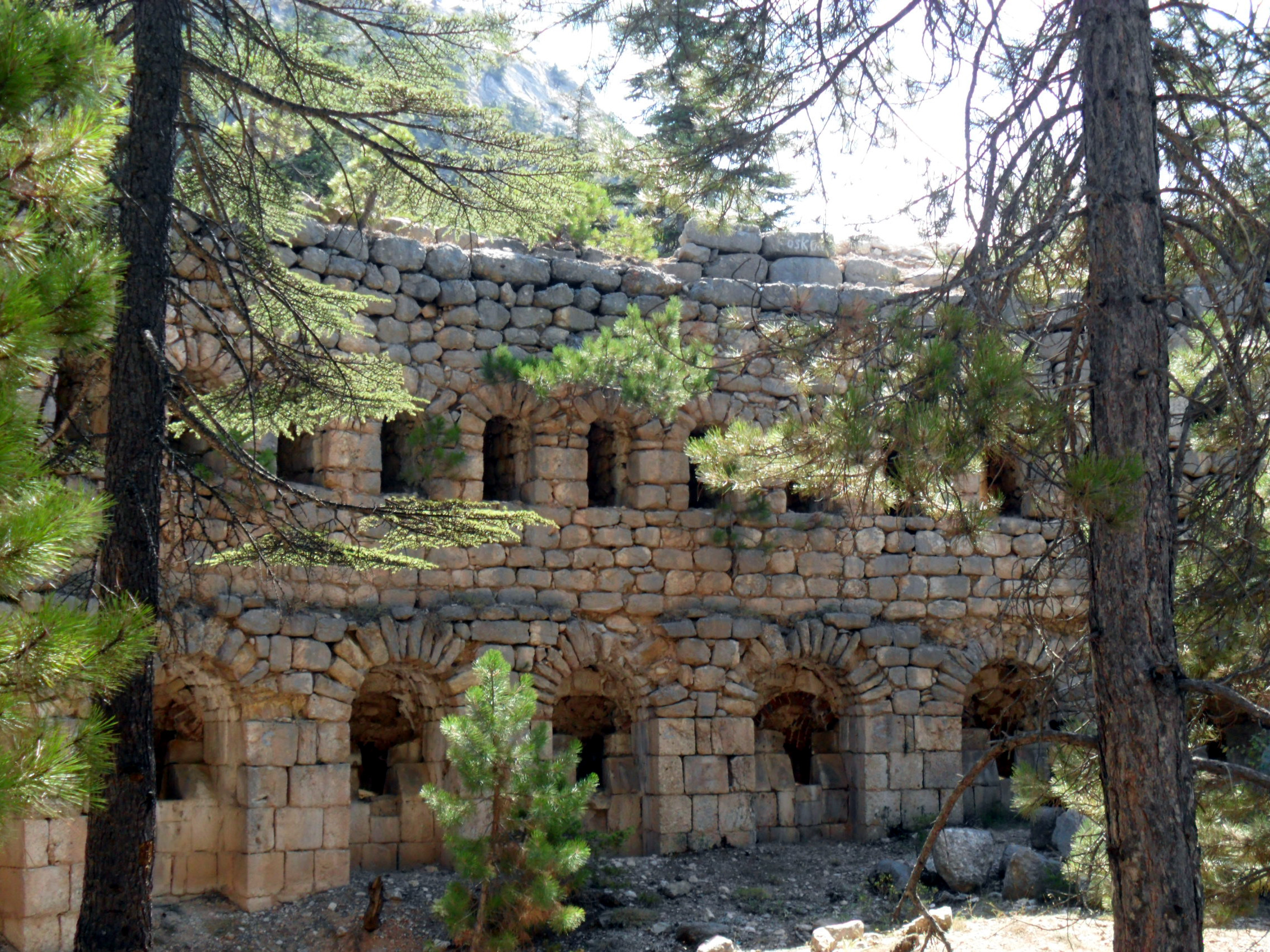
Casemate of İbrahim Pasha

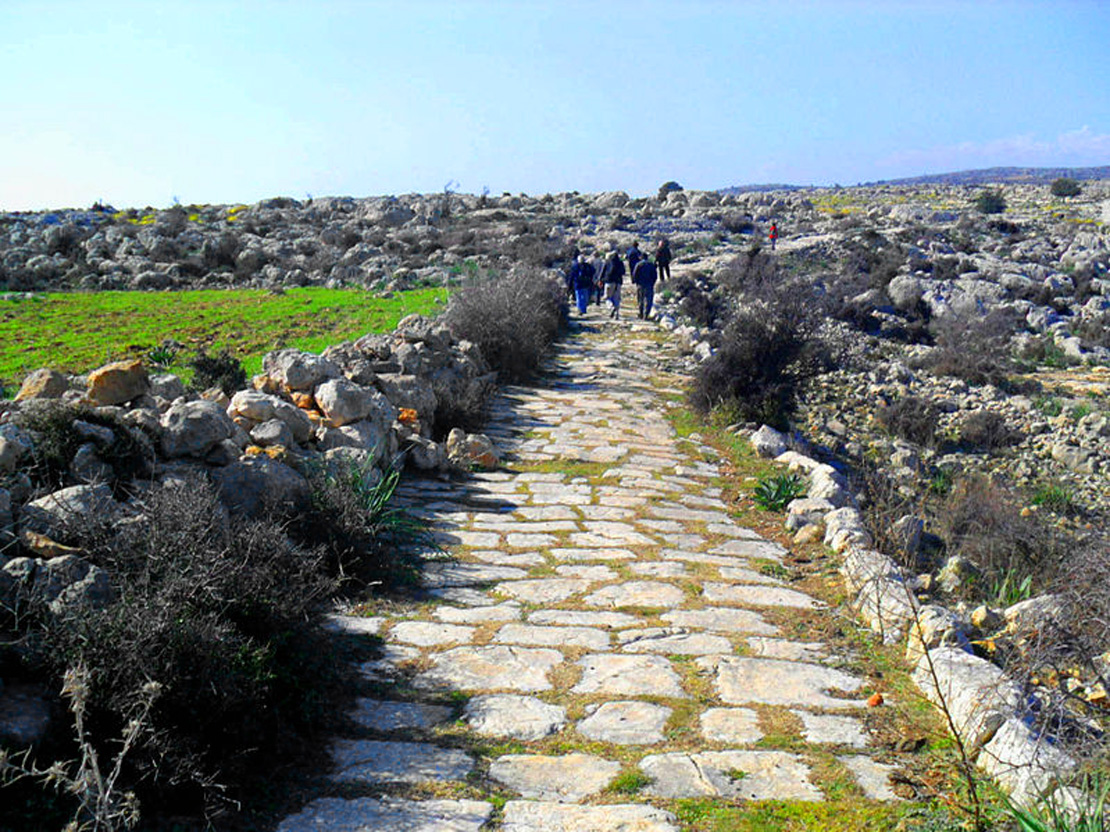
Roman Road

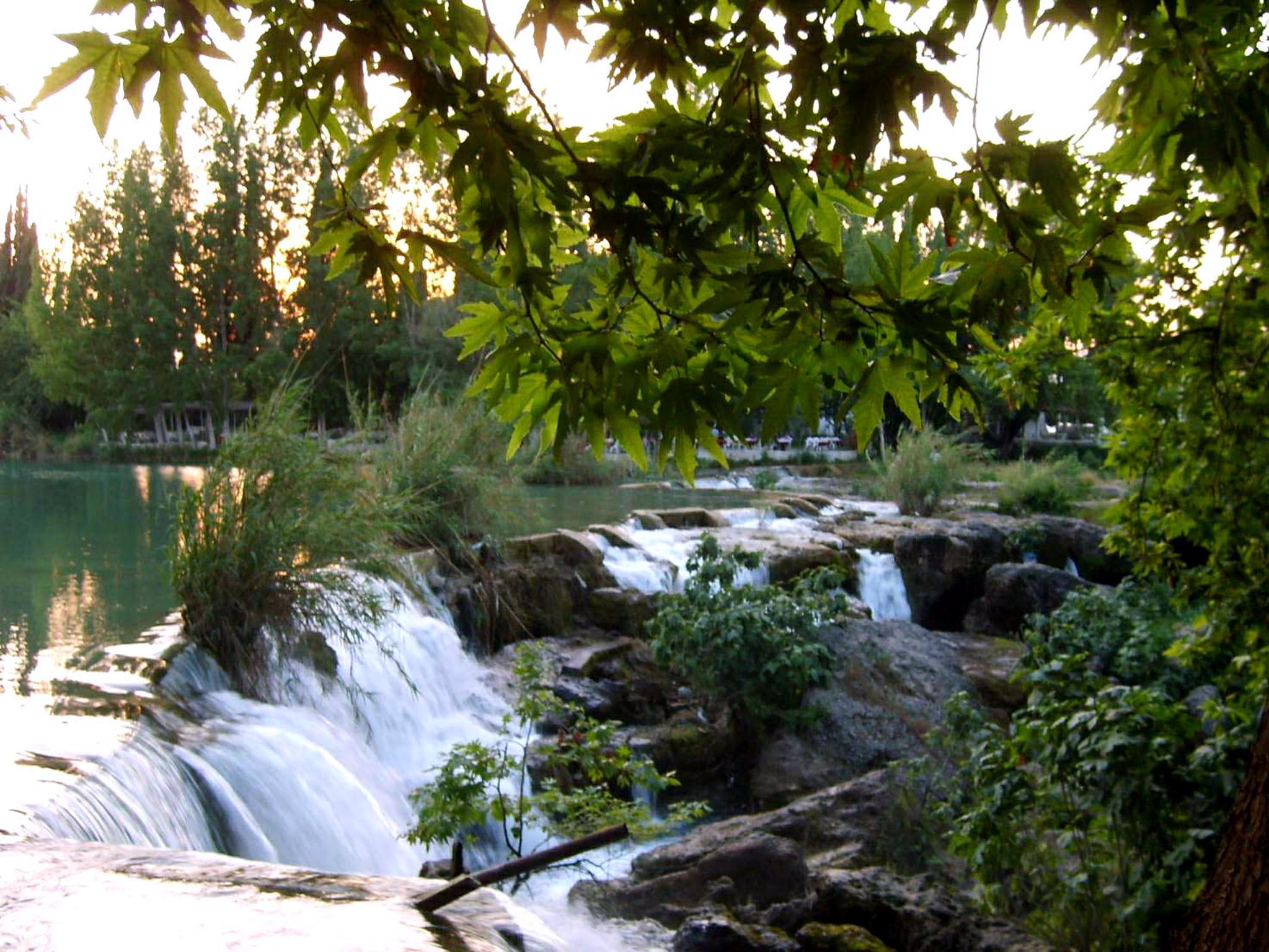
Berdan waterfall

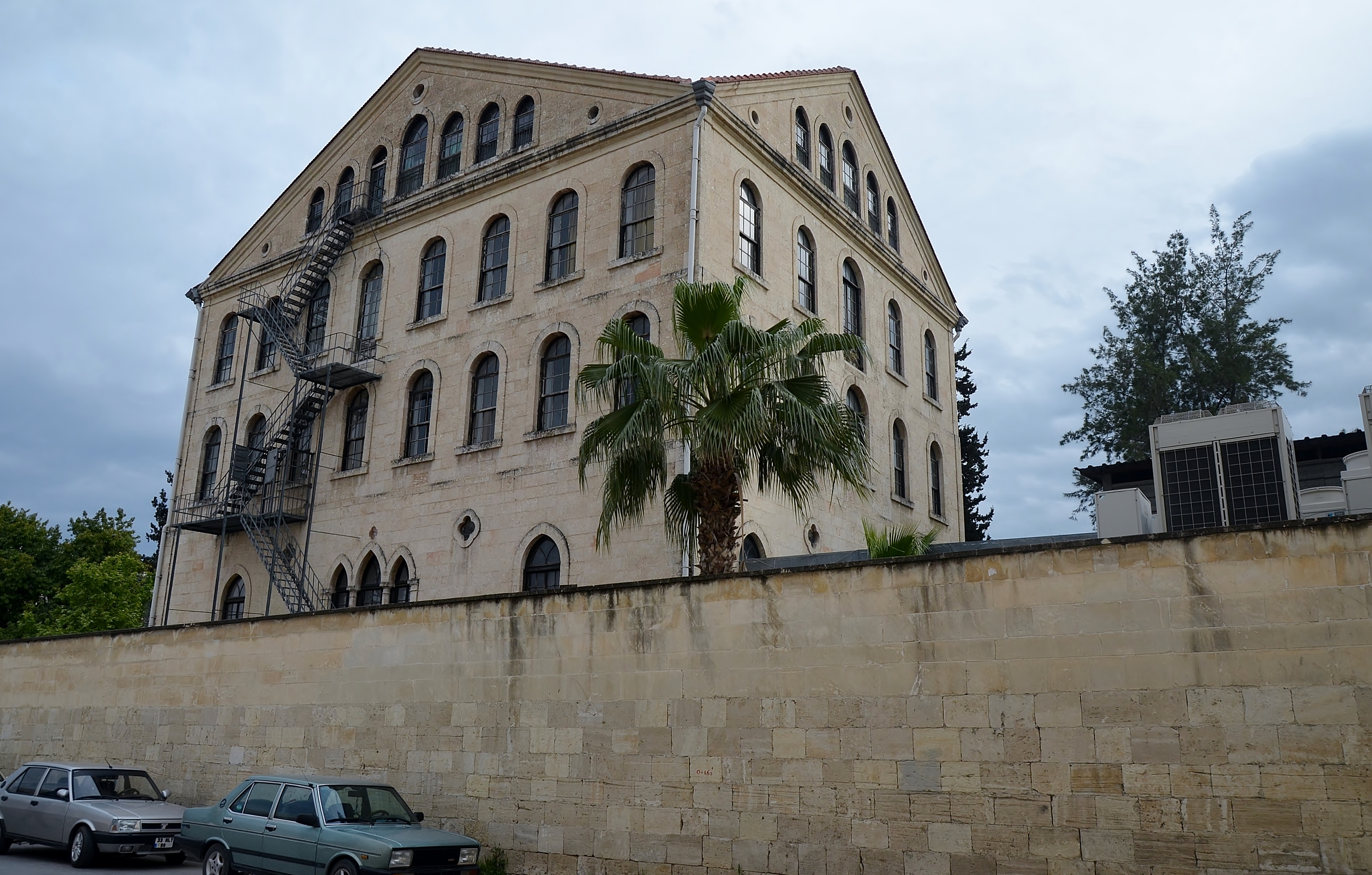
Tarsus American College, Stickler Building

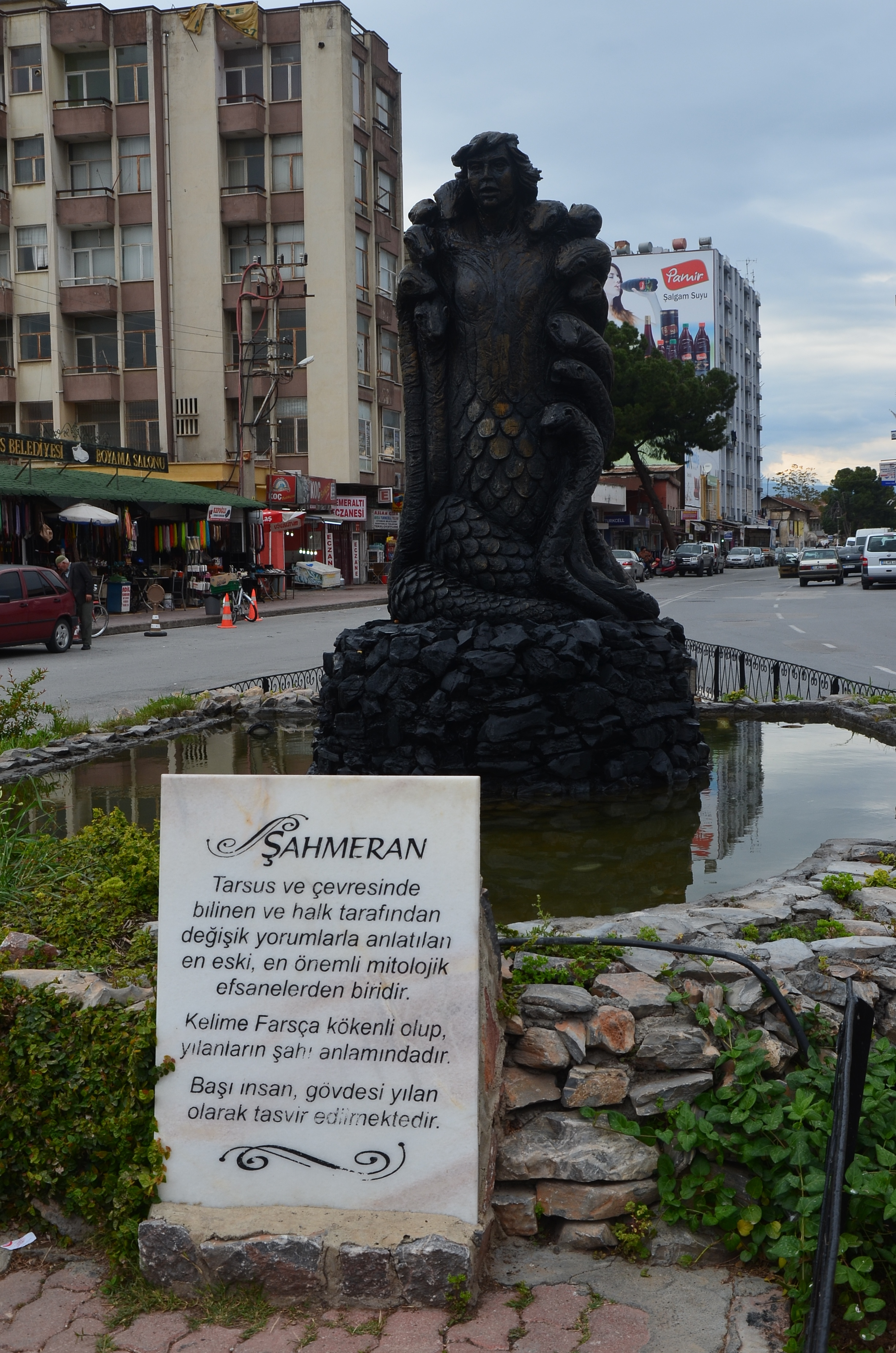
Statue of Shahmaran (mythology)

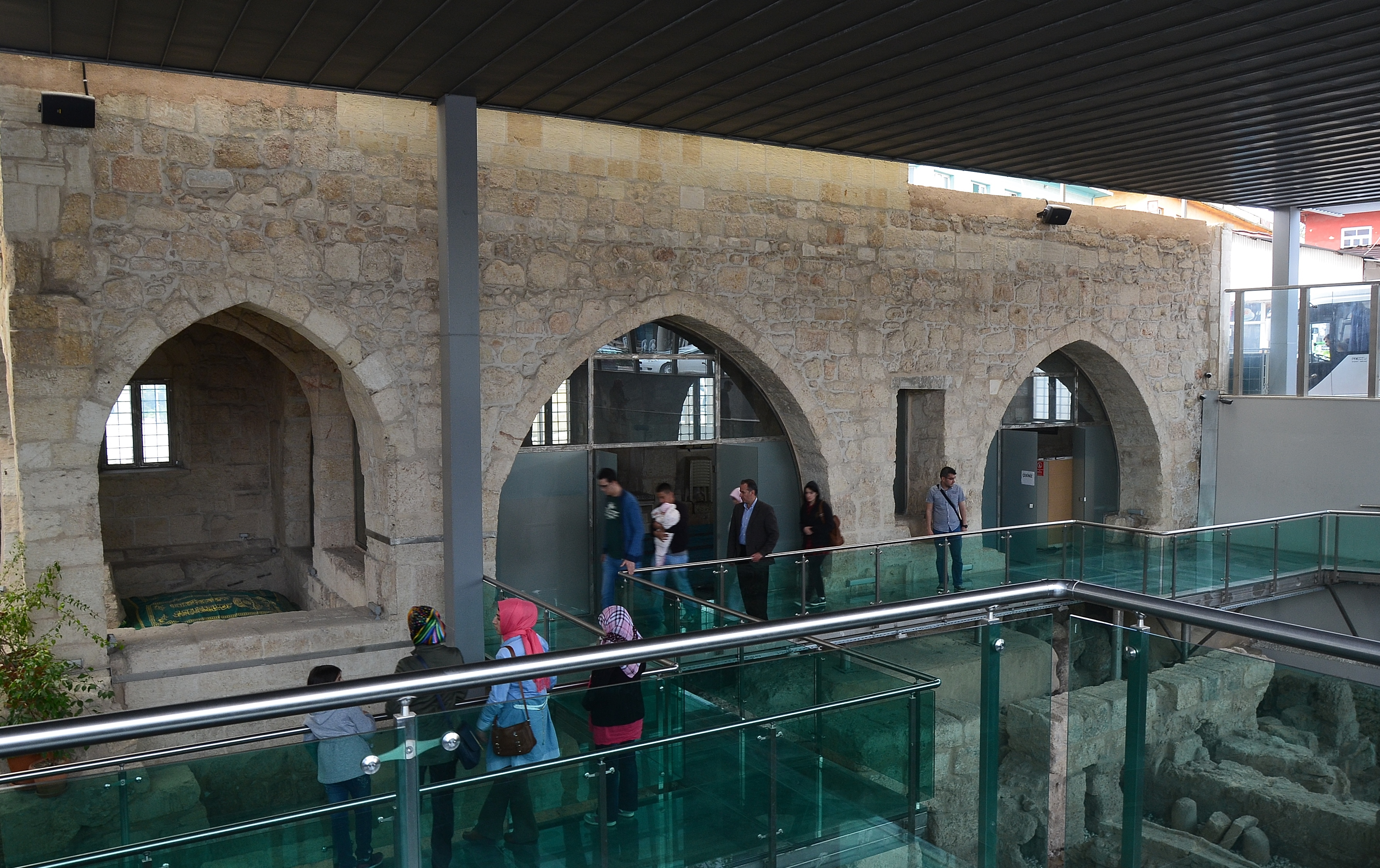
Ruins of Makam-ı Danyal Mosque

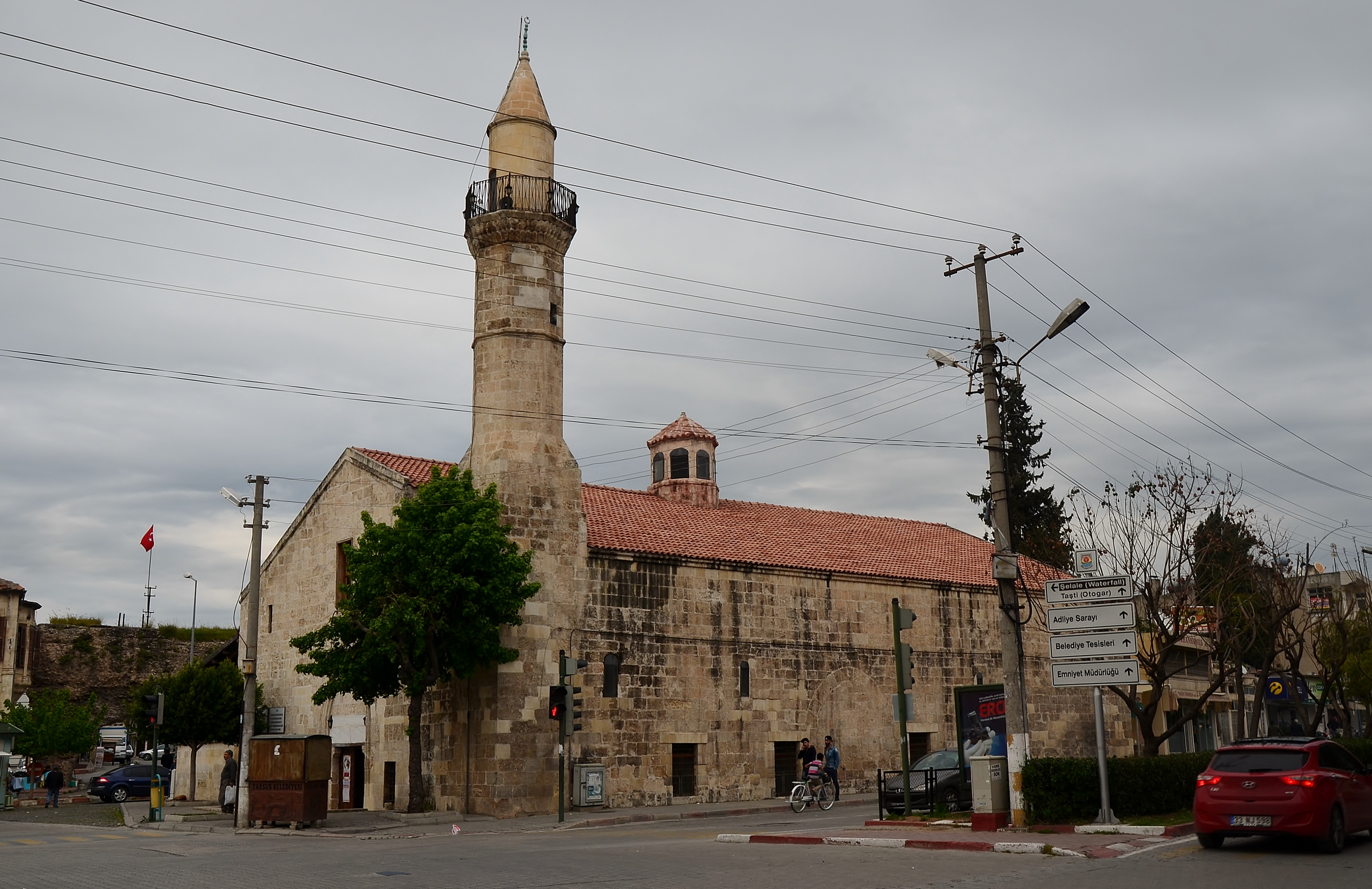
Old Mosque converted from church

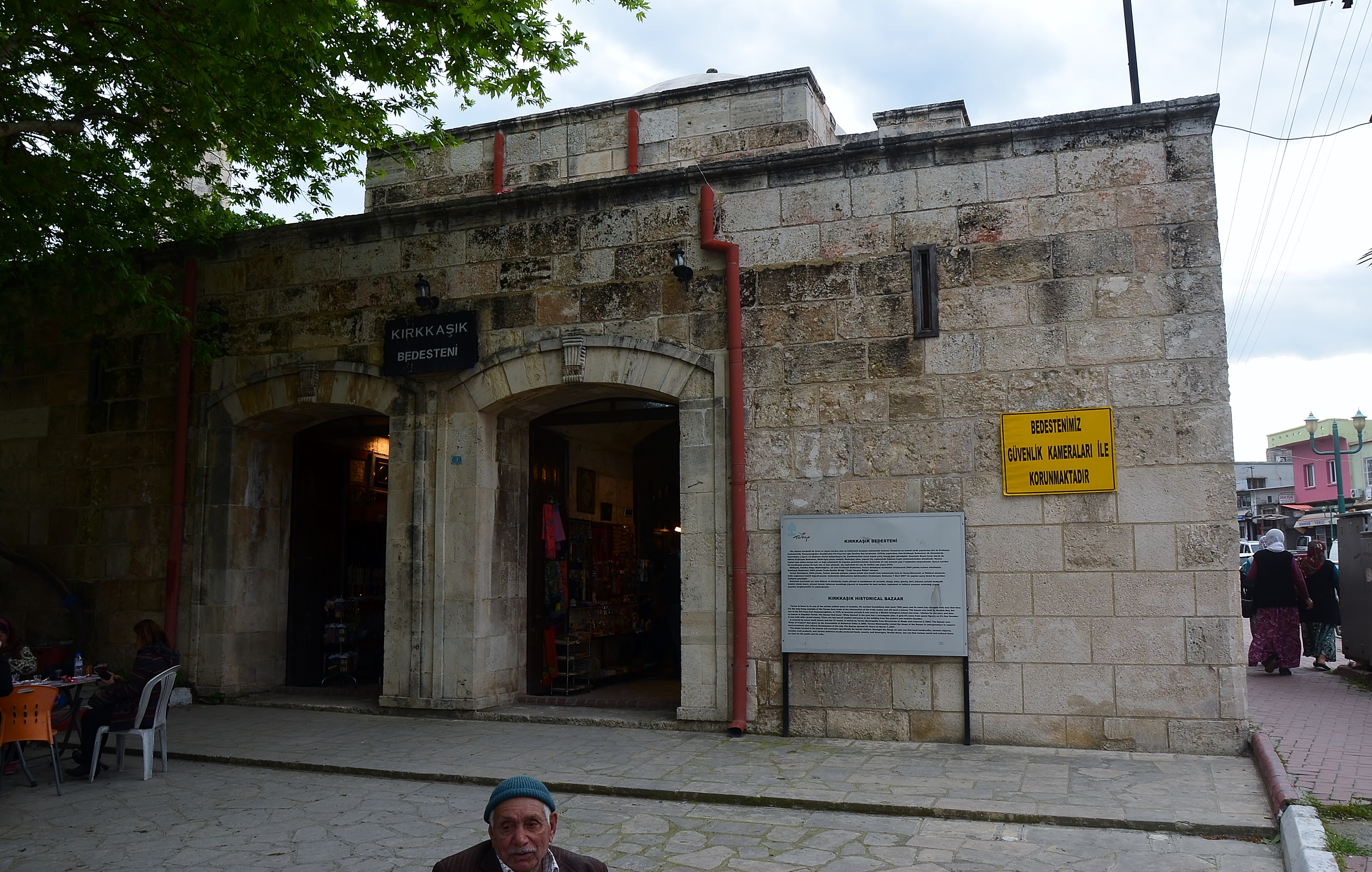
Kırkkaşık Bazaar

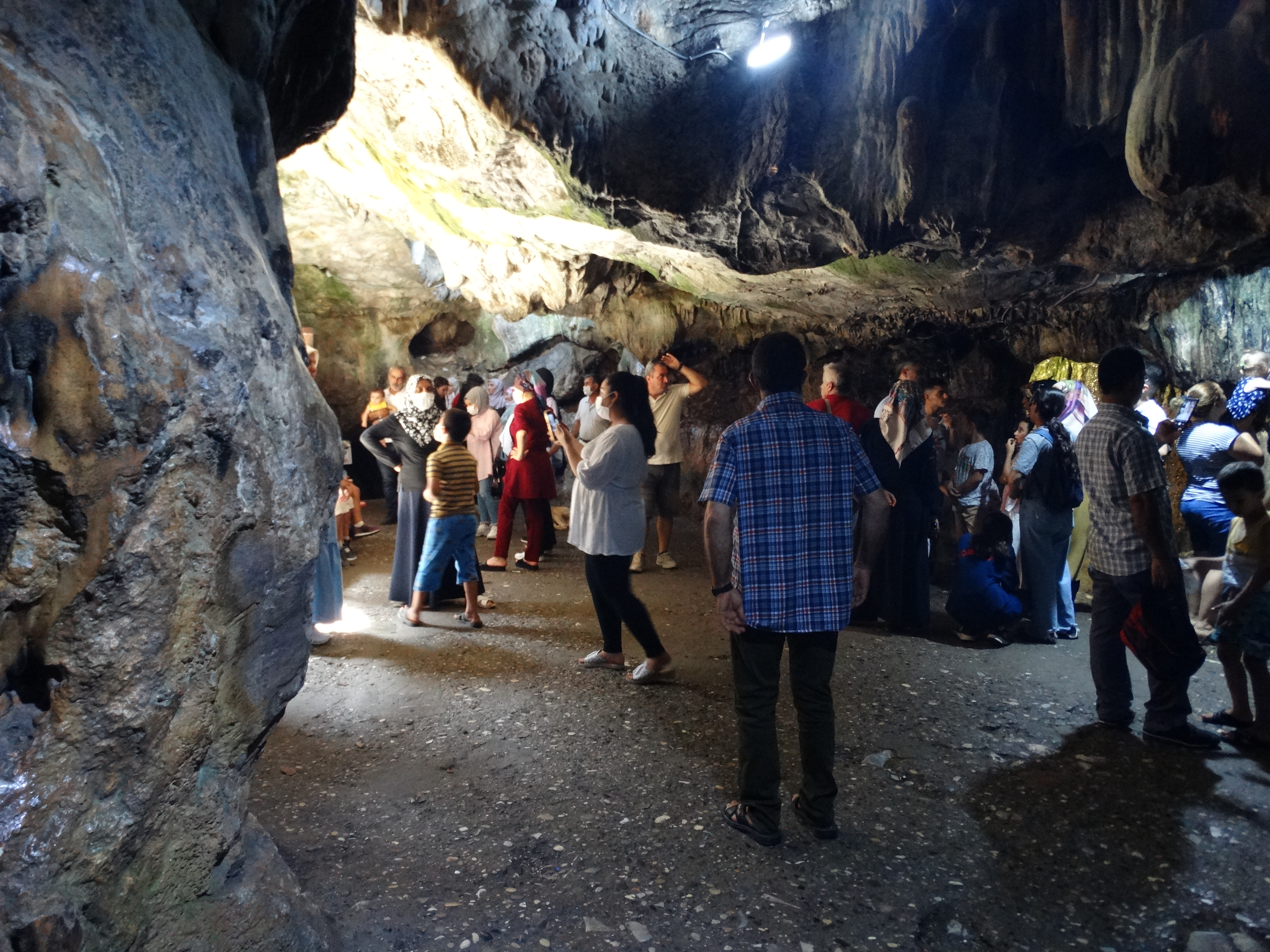
The cave of seven sleepers

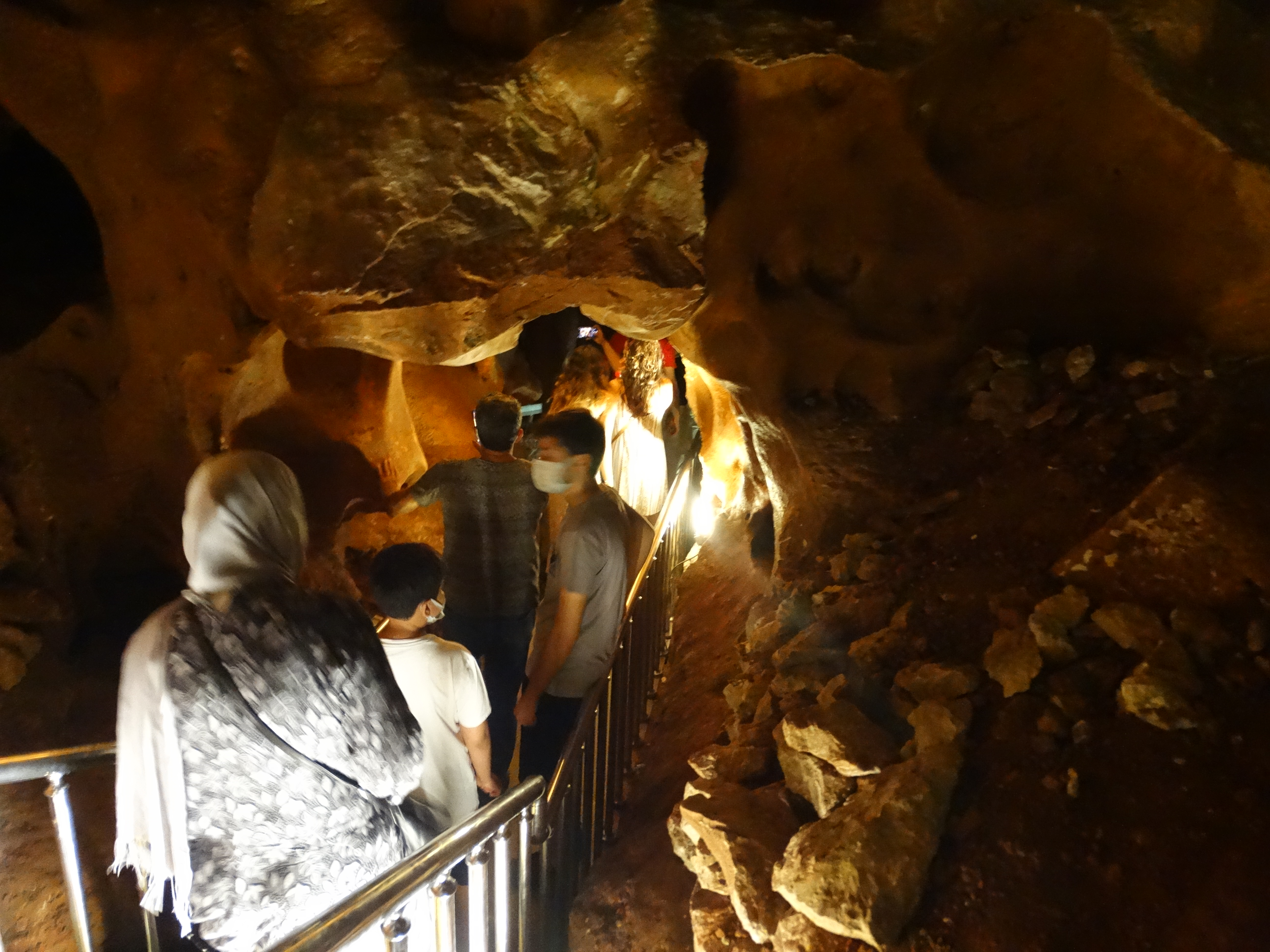
Toshkuyu cave

== See also ==
- Tarsus (West Syriac Diocese)
