= Donuktaş =

Roman temple in Tarsus, Turkey

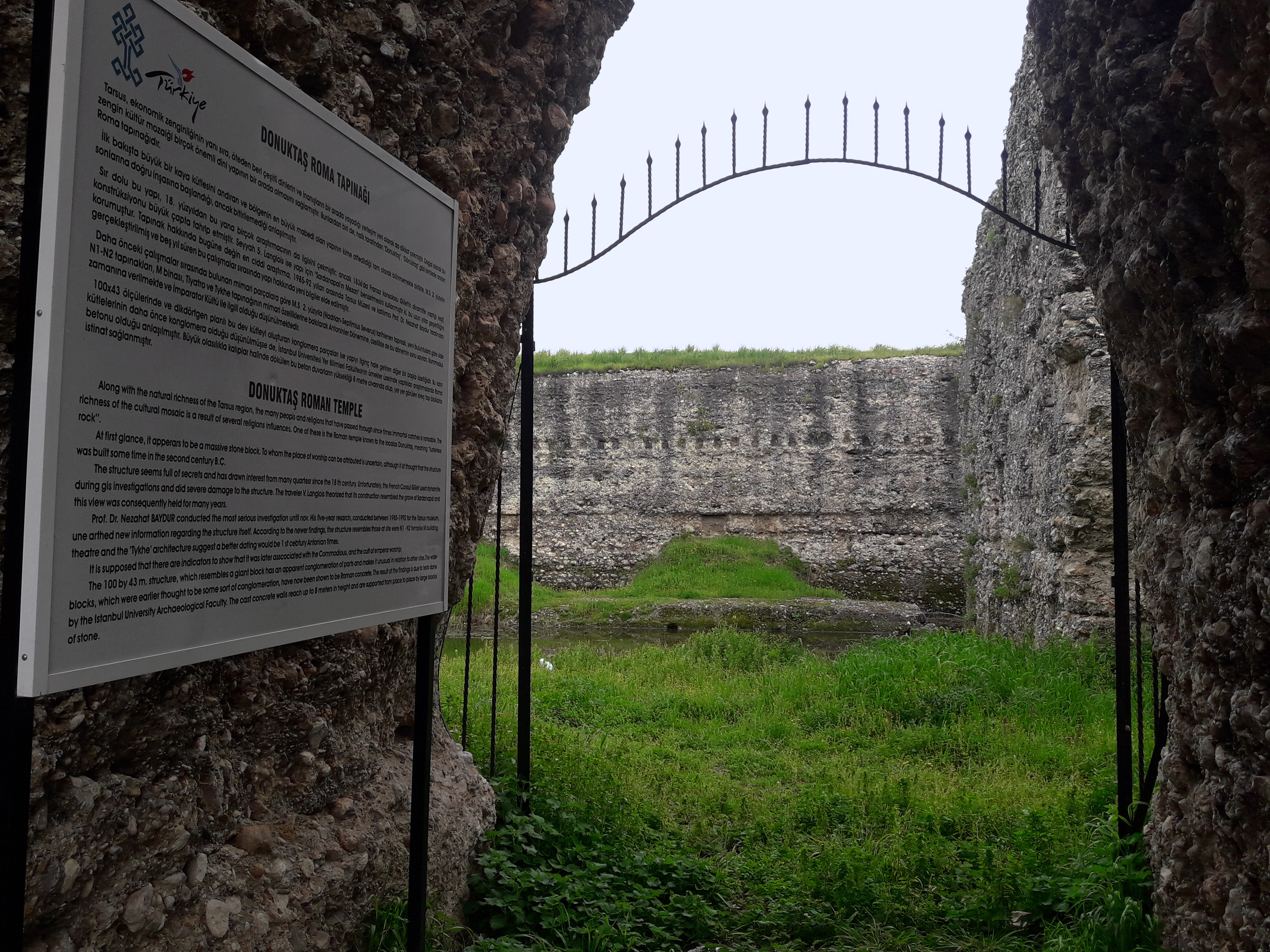
- Gate of Donuktaş

- Location within Turkey
- 36°54′59″N 34°54′12″E
- Type: Temple
- Location: Tarsus, Mersin Province, Turkey

Site notes
- Height: 8 m (26 ft)
- Length: 98 m (322 ft)
- Width: 43 m (141 ft)
- Archaeologists: Nezahat Baydur; Winfried Held
- Condition: In ruins

Donuktaş (literally “Pale Stone”) is a Roman temple in Tarsus ilçe (district) of Mersin Province, southern Turkey.

== Location ==
Donuktaş is in the urban fabric of Tarsus. It is to the east of other historical places of Tarsus and to the north of Turkish state highway D.400. Its distance to Mersin is about 29 km (18 mi).

== Exploration history ==
The first written document about Donuktaş dates back to 1545. According to a member of the Venetian Barbaro family, who was the Bailo of Constantinople, Donuktaş was a palace. But according to later accounts in the 19th century, it is a mausoleum. The French historian Victor Langlois (1829–1869) in his book Voyage Dans la Cilicie et Dans la Montagnes du Taurus 1852-1853 described Donuktaş as the mausoleum of Sardanapalus (612-605 BC), the last Assyrian king. The German archaeologist Robert Koldewey (1855–1925) supported this assertion. British orientalist William Burckhardt Barker (1810?–1856) on the other hand, believed that Donuktaş is a mausoleum of another king. However, during the systematic exploration between 1982 and 1992 by Turkish archaeologist Nezahat Baydur, Donuktaş was defined as a temple built in the 2nd century, during the Roman Empire, much later than the Neo-Assyrian Empire (911–609 BC). Originally, It was a temple of Sandon, an ancient Hittite deity. Later, Sandon was identified with the Roman god Jupiter, and the temple became a Temple of Jupiter. The exploration continued after 2007 by the German archaeologist Winfried Held.

== The building ==
The building is huge construction without a roof. It has a rectangular form oriented in northeast to southwest direction. Its length is 98 m (322 ft) and the width is 43 m (141 ft). It is surrounded by 6.5 m (21 ft)-thick walls. The walls are about 8 m (26 ft) high. The building material is Roman cement. Although the wall is presently naked, it was originally covered by marble.

== See also ==
- Temple of Jupiter (Silifke)
