= Cleopatra's Gate =

Historical gate in Tarsus, Turkey

Coordinates: 36°54′46.9″N 34°53′31.4″E

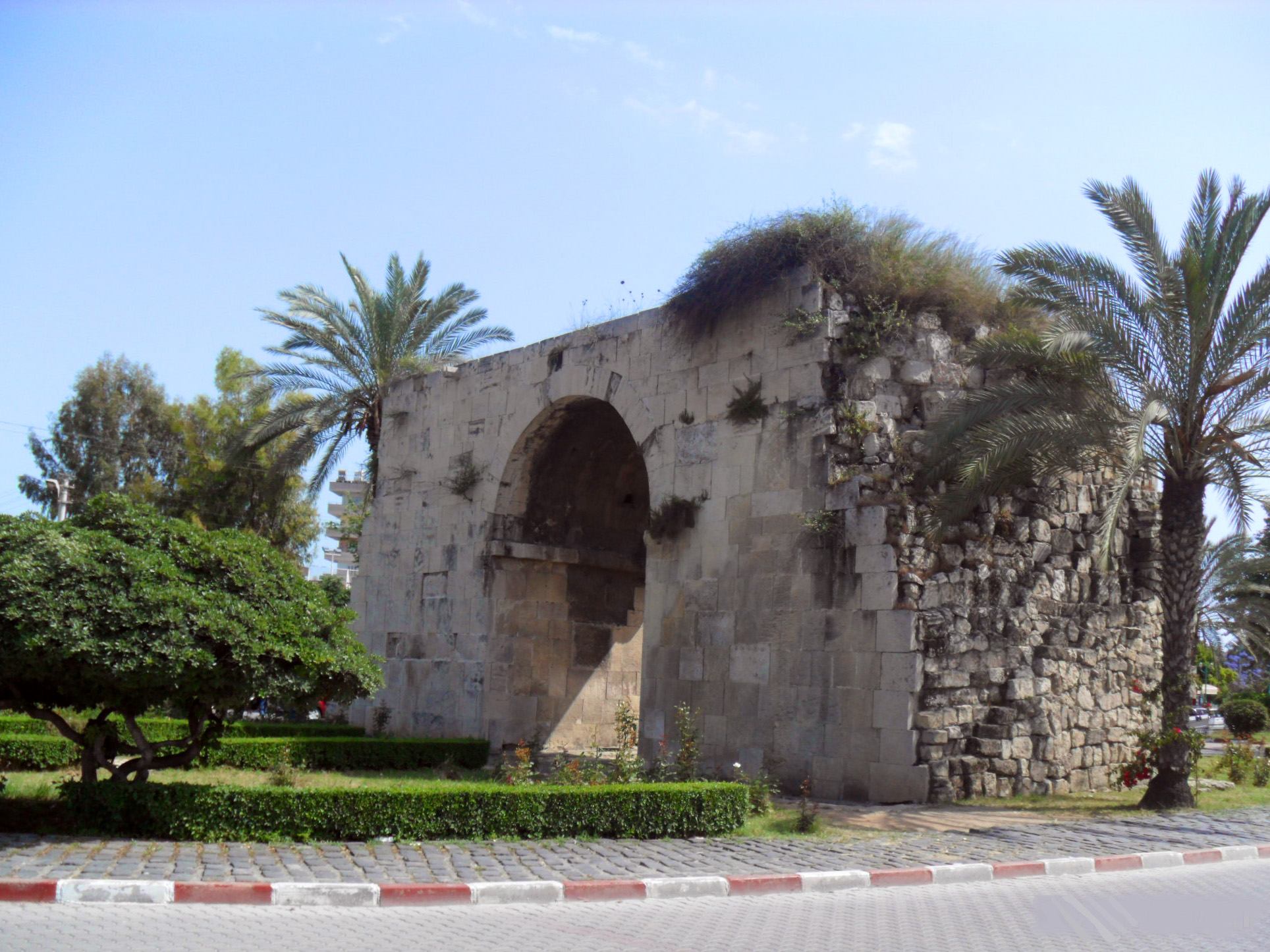
Cleopatra's Gate (Turkish: Kleopatra Kapısı)

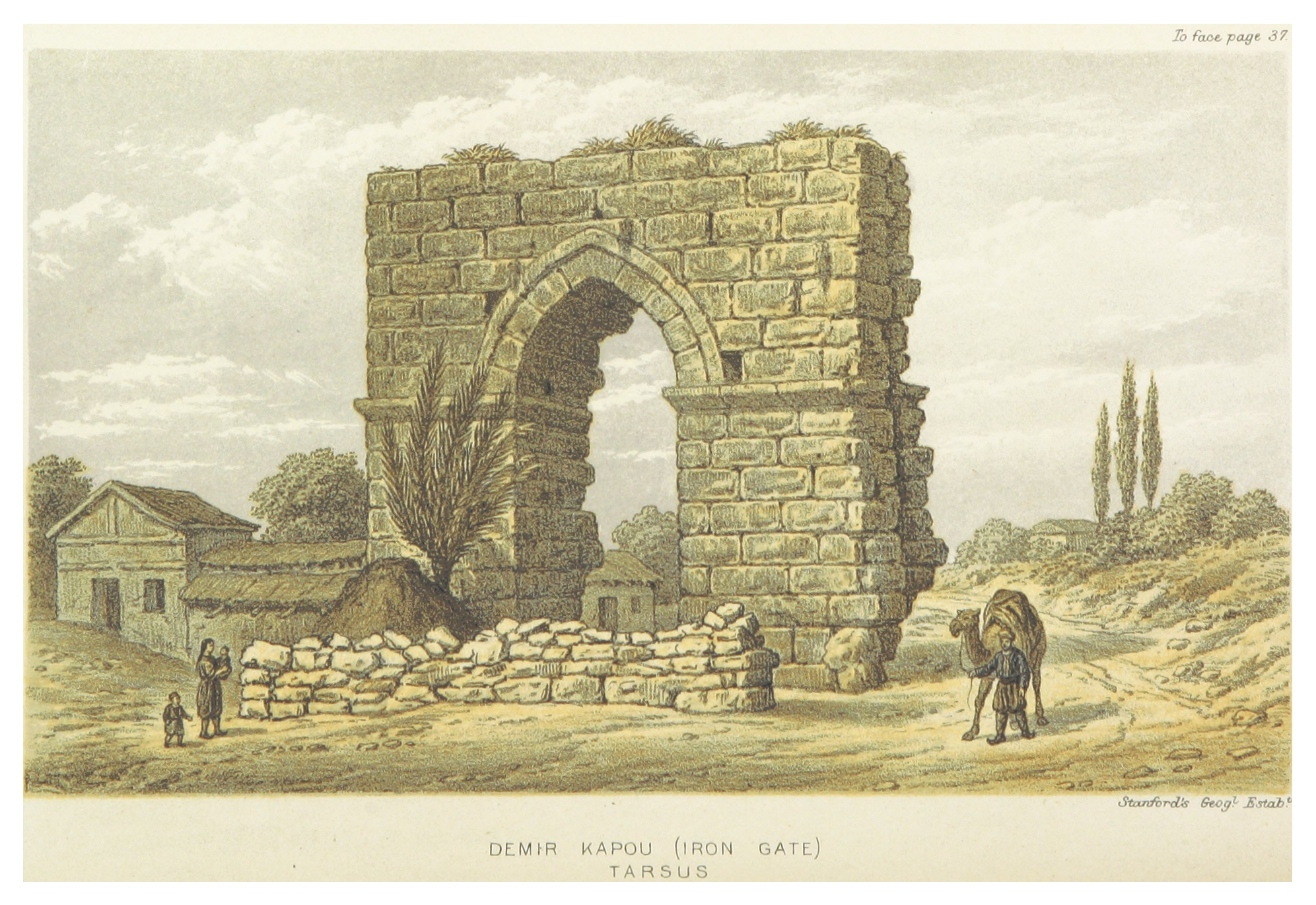
Demir Kapi (Iron Gate) was the second important gate of the city walls

Cleopatra's Gate is a city gate of Tarsus, in Mersin Province, Turkey, named after the Egyptian (Ptolemaic) queen Cleopatra VII.

== History of Tarsus and its walls ==
Tarsus, located in the region known as Cilicia Pedias in Antiquity (modern south-central Turkey), was an important city during both the ancient and the medieval eras. It was the capital of Roman province of Cilicia. In 41 BC, Mark Antony during his struggle against Octavian, allied himself with Cleopatra VII in Tarsus.

Tarsus was enclosed by a pair of concentric defense walls. According to 17th century-Turkish traveler Evliya Çelebi, there were three gates; a mountain gate to Toros Mountains in the north, a port gate to the Mediterranean coastline in the south and the Adana Gate to the neighbouring city of Adana in the east. In 1835, the walls were demolished by Ibrahim Pasha of Egypt, following the Egyptian–Ottoman War of 1831–1833. Only the port gate survived up to the present time, albeit because of alluvial deposits from the rivers Berdan and Seyhan, the coastline is currently 15 kilometres (9.3 mi) south of the port gate.

Cleopatra entered Tarsus via the port gate. The history of the gate after Cleopatra is not documented, but by analyzing the building stones and the cement, it is usually believed that the original gate was rebuilt during the Middle Ages, either by the Byzantine Empire or by the Abbasids. The popular name of the gate was Kancık Kapı (feminine gate) during the late Ottoman period. However, from the early 20th century, the name Cleopatra kapısı ("Cleopatra's Gate") replaced the former name.

The outer height of the gate is 8.53 metres (28.0 ft) and the inner height is 6.17 metres (20.2 ft). The length of the passage is 6.48 metres (21.3 ft). The mortar used in the original gate was khorosan mortar. The gate was used on the street up to 30 years ago, when it was put under restoration, which resulted in the partial loss of its original appearance.

Gate is still treated as one of the most important points of the city.
