= Sağlıklı =

- Neighbourhood
- Location in Turkey
- Coordinates: 37°02′0″N 34°54′30″E
- Country: Turkey
- Province: Mersin
- District: Tarsus
- Elevation: 175 m (574 ft)
- Population (2022): 1,212
- Time zone: UTC+3 (TRT)
- Area code: 0324

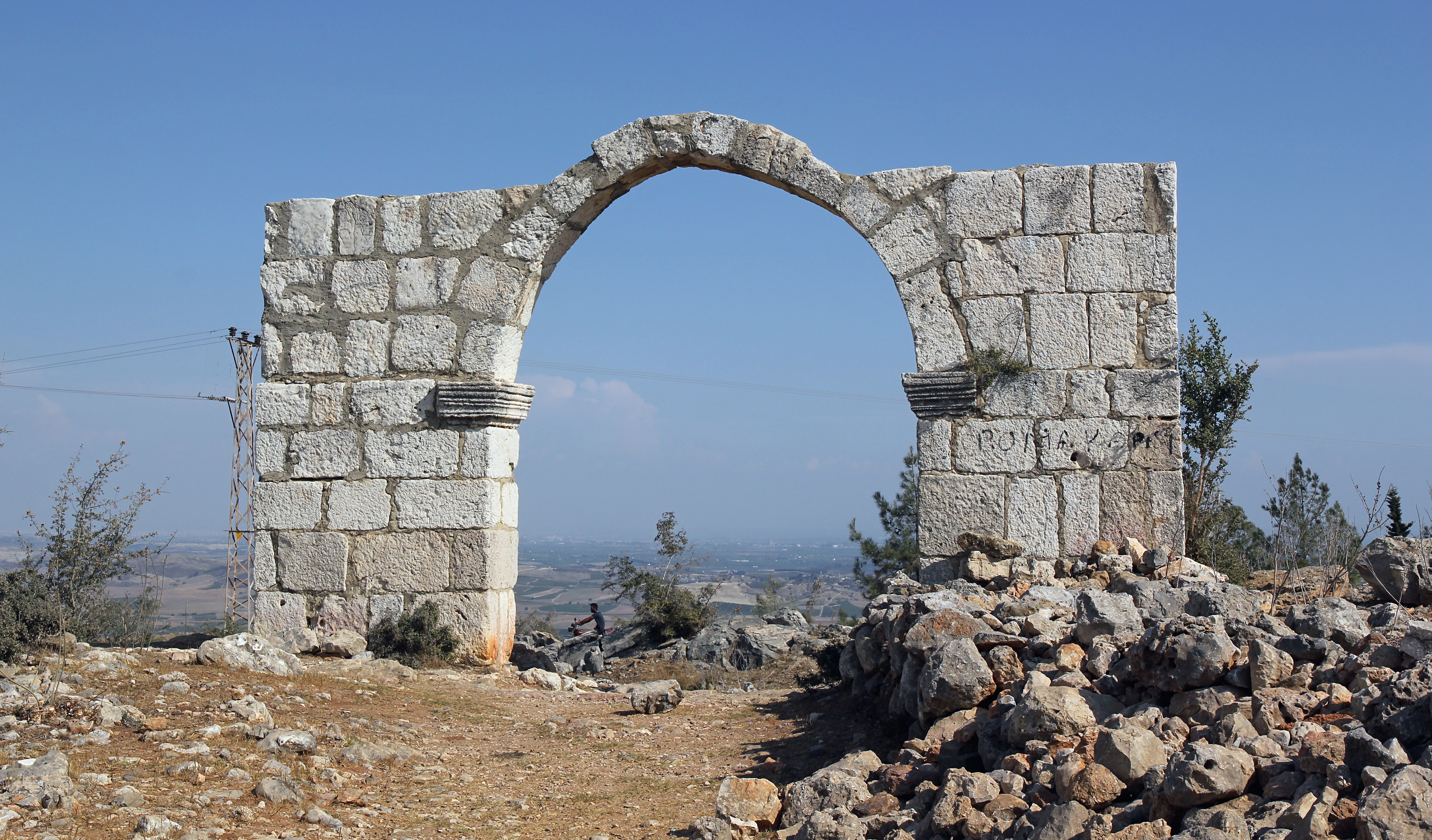
Roman road near Sağlıklı

Sağlıklı is a neighbourhood in the municipality and district of Tarsus, Mersin Province, Turkey. Its population is 1,212 (2022). It is 10 kilometres (6.2 mi) to Tarsus and 37 kilometres (23 mi) to Mersin. Sağlıklı is famed for the 3 kilometres (1.9 mi) Roman road, the starting point of which is near the village.
