= Roman road in Cilicia =

Ancient Roman road in Turkey

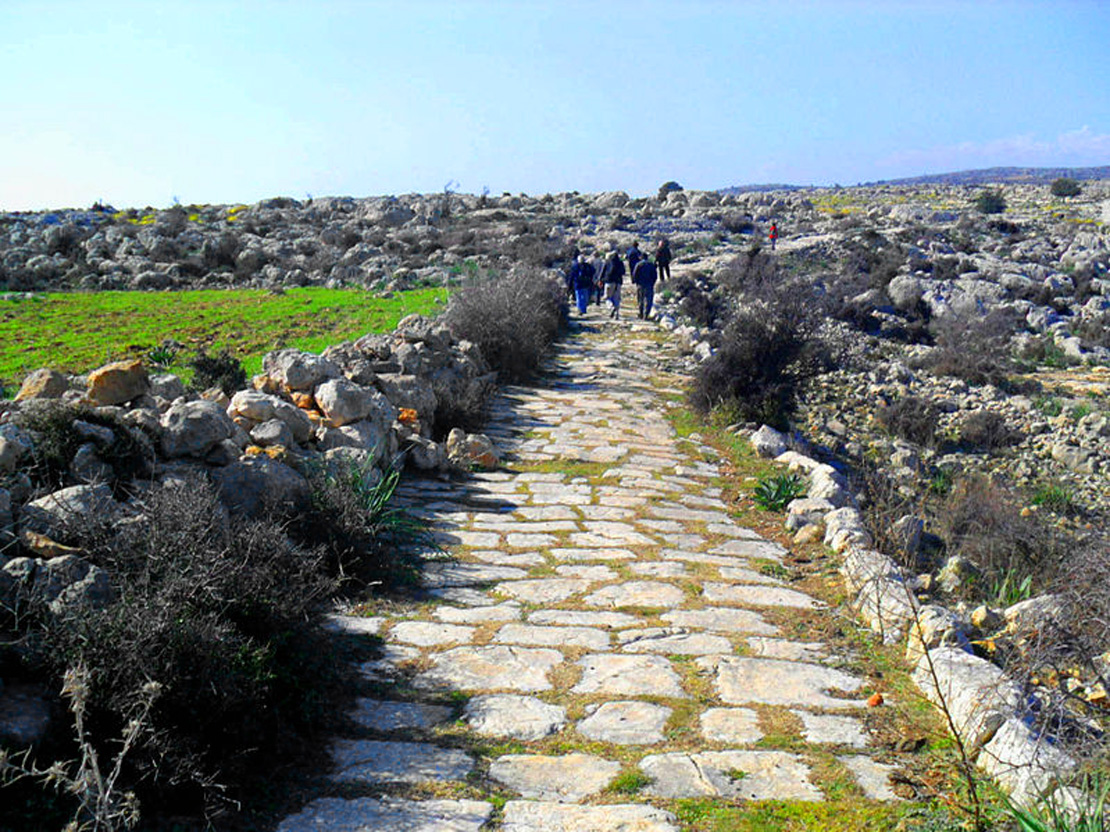
The Roman road near Sağlıklı village, in Tarsus district of Mersin province.

The Roman road in Cilicia (Turkish: Roma yolu) is a part of a Roman road in Mersin Province, Turkey.

== Geography ==
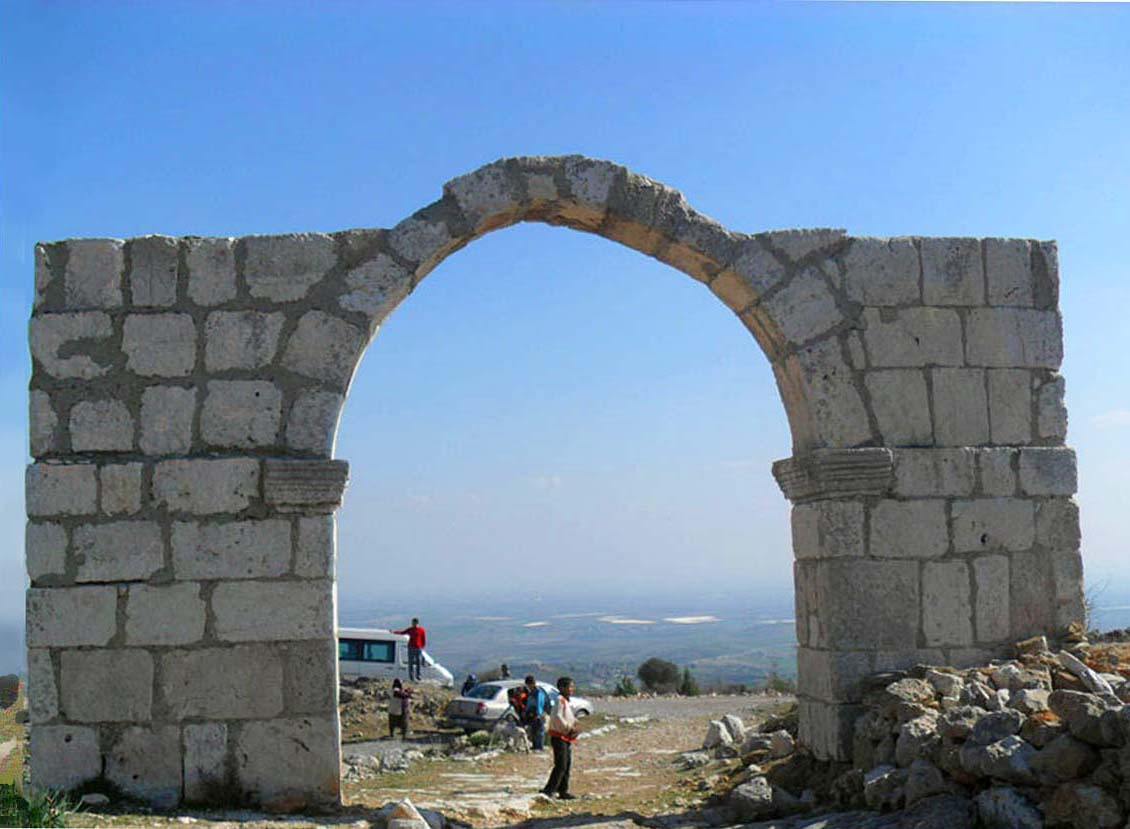
Gate at the southern end

The road is thought to be a part of the main road connecting Cilicia to Capadocia during antiquity. The northern terminus was likely in the town of Bahçeli, a part of the ancient city of Tyanna in Niğde Province. The southern terminus was in Tarsus, a major district center in Mersin Province and an important ancient city. The modern highway distance between these two locations is 148 kilometres (92 mi). But presently only a small section of the road has been unearthed. The unearthed road starts from a hill at about 37°03′N 34°54′E around Sağlıklı village which is 14 kilometres (8.7 mi) from Tarsus, and continues about 3 kilometres (1.9 mi) to the north. The average altitude of the road is 300 metres (980 ft) to 400 metres (1,300 ft). At the southern end of the unearthed section, where Tarsus is in the view, there is a gate which was either an arch gate or a border check point of Cilicia. There is also a very short road in Tarsus urban fabric called Ancient road which has been discovered only recently. But whether the two roads are connected is unclear.

== History ==
The road is thought to have been constructed in the 1st century AD by the Roman Empire. But according to a restoration inscription next to the road, it was rebuilt or repaired during the reign of Caracalla in the 3rd century. The original gate, dated to 5th century, was destroyed at some point, and the present gate was reconstructed much later.

== Technical details ==
The road is stone pavement and there are stone parapets on each side of the road. The width of the road excluding the parapet is about 3 metres (9.8 ft).

The outer dimensions of the cut stone gate is 8.8 m. wide x 5.2 m. high (28.98 ft high x 17 ft wide). The inner width is 4.11 metres (13.5 ft).
