= Temple of Jupiter (Silifke) =

Ruined Roman temple in Silifke, Turkey

- Roma Tapınağı
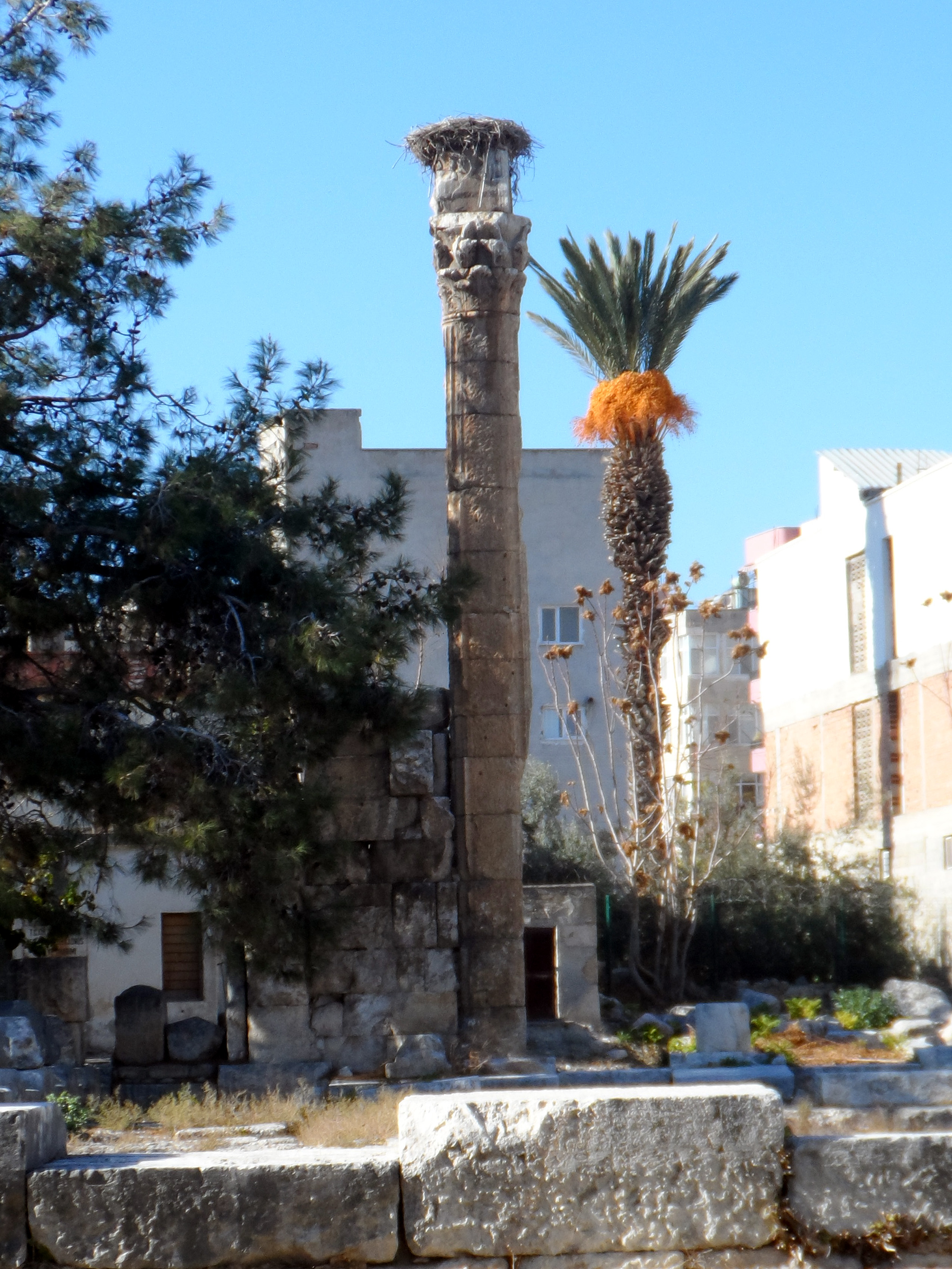
- From the south

- Location within Turkey
- 36°22′33″N 33°55′49″E
- Type: Temple
- Location: Silifke, Mersin Province, Turkey
- Region: Cilicia Trachea

Site notes
- Condition: Mostly in ruins

The Temple of Jupiter is a ruined Roman temple in Silifke, Turkey. It was built in the 2nd century, and presently one column still stands.

Silifke is an ilçe (district) in Mersin Province. Although the city which was founded by Seleucus I Nicator is an old city, the ground level of the city was elevated because of the floods caused by Göksu River (Calycadnus of the antiquity) and there are few archaeological remains on the surface of the present city fabric. Jupiter's temple is an exception, since it was originally built on a 2 metres (6 ft 7 in) high platform. Presently, there is no official restoration work on the ruins. But they are protected by fencing. They are situated to the west of the İnönü Boulevard of Silifke at 36°22′33″N 33°55′49″E.

== History ==
Jupiter's Temple was built in the 2nd century AD during the Roman Empire. According to a legend told by the historian Zosimus of the 5th century, when the fields around Silifke were infested by grasshoppers, Silifke citizens asked the god Apollo to protect their crop. Apollo sent a flock of grasshopper-eating birds. The people built the temple to show their gratitude.

It was a peripteros type temple with 14x 8 corinthian columns. Its outer dimensions were 40 metres (130 ft) length and 21 metres (69 ft) width. The height of each column was 10 metres (33 ft). Presently only one column is standing. During the Byzantine Empire era, the temple was transformed into a church.

== See also ==
- List of Ancient Roman temples
