= Bolatlı =

Bolatlı can refer to:

== People ==
- Rıdvan Bolatlı (1928–2022), Turkish football defender

== Places ==
- Bolatlı, Gölpazarı, village in Gölpazarı District, Bilecik Province, Turkey
- Bolatlı, Tarsus, neighborhood of Tarsus, Mersin Province, Turkey
