= Caravel =

Type of sailing ship

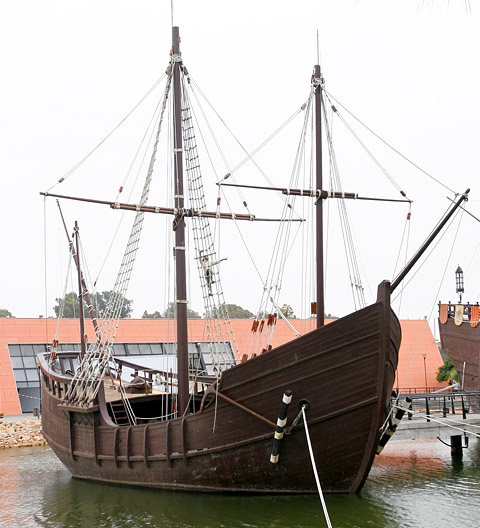
Replica of the Pinta in Palos de la Frontera, one of the Spanish ships of Christopher Columbus's first voyage to the West Indies, and one of the first two caravels to reach the New World in 1492.

The caravel (Galician: carabela, IPA: [kaɾaˈbɛla]; Portuguese: caravela, IPA: [kɐɾɐˈvɛlɐ]; Spanish: carabela, IPA: [kaɾaˈbela]) was a small sailing ship that developed from the fishing craft of Galicia, Portugal, and Atlantic Andalusia. It could be rigged either entirely with lateen sails or with a combination of lateen and square sails. It was noted for its capacity for sailing windward (beating) and for its remarkable speed. Caravels were used by the Portuguese and the Spanish for voyages of exploration during the 15th and 16th centuries, in the Age of Exploration.

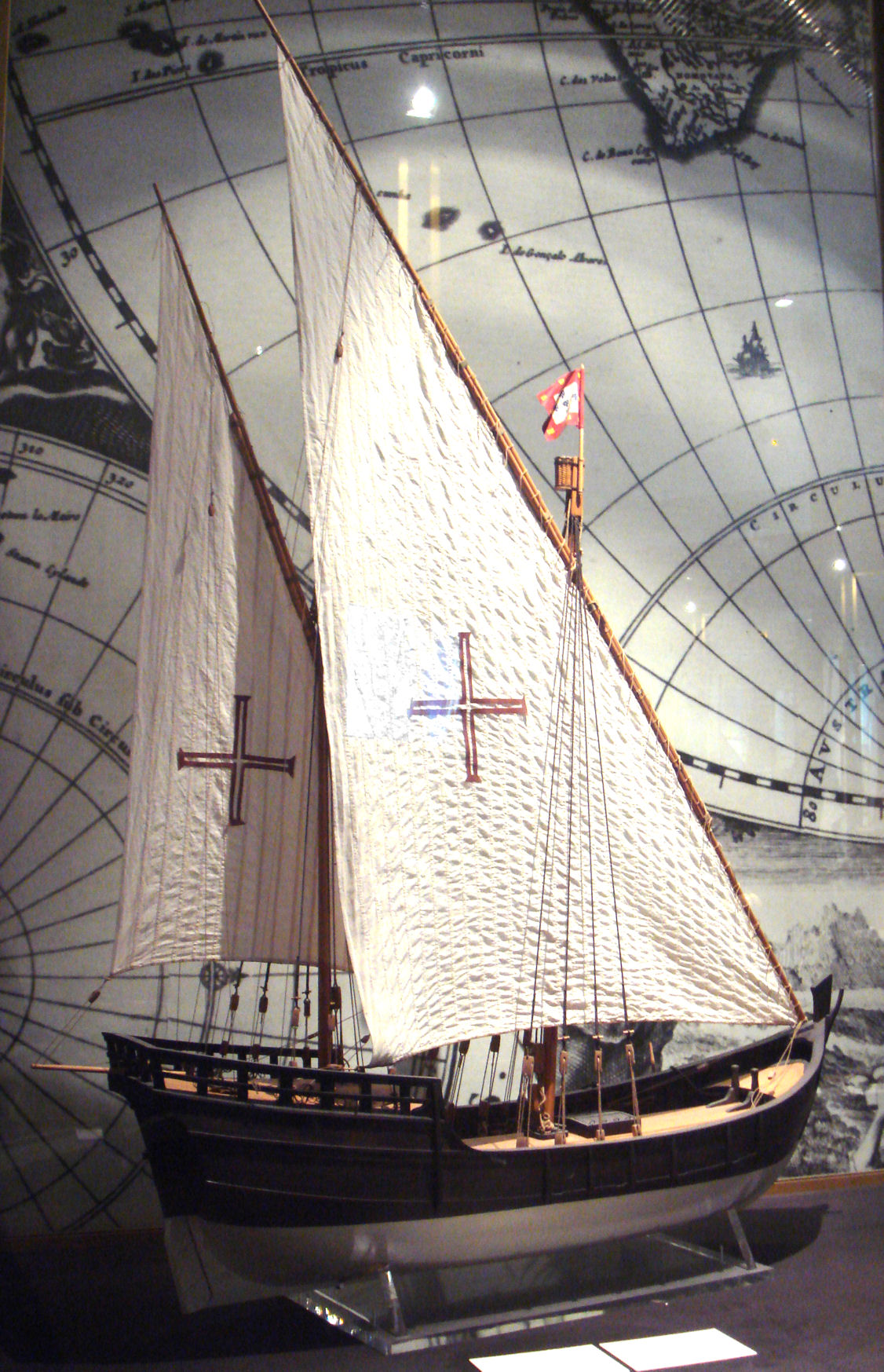
Model of a Portuguese caravel, found in the Musée national de la Marine

The caravel is a poorly understood type of vessel. Though there are now some archaeologically investigated wrecks that are most likely caravels, information on this type is limited. The ships of the Greeks and Romans of classical antiquity are better understood than caravels are.

== Etymology ==
The English name caravel derives from the Portuguese caravela. The word caravela in Portuguese, or carabela in Galician and Castilian Spanish, descends from the Late Latin carăbus (wicker vessel), and this in turn from the Byzantine Greek κάραβος (kárabos, light ship). This is also the etymology of the Medieval Spanish cárabo (a small Mediterranean sailing ship), and the modern Greek καράβι (karávi, ship). This linguistic lineage corresponds with a documented continuity of carvel-planking construction practices across the Mediterranean basin.

Alternatively, some historians propose a parallel origin via the Arabic qārib (قارب, a small boat).

The earliest documented usage of the word in Portuguese records occurs in 1255, while the final entries in printed maritime records date to 1766, indicating that the designation was applied to varying hull types over a multi-century period.

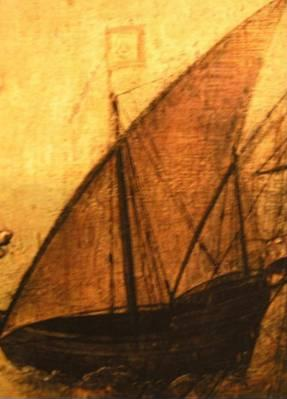
What is believed to be the most accurate depiction of a lateen caravel, featured in the 16th century Retábulo de Santa Auta, now at the National Museum of Ancient Art, in Lisbon

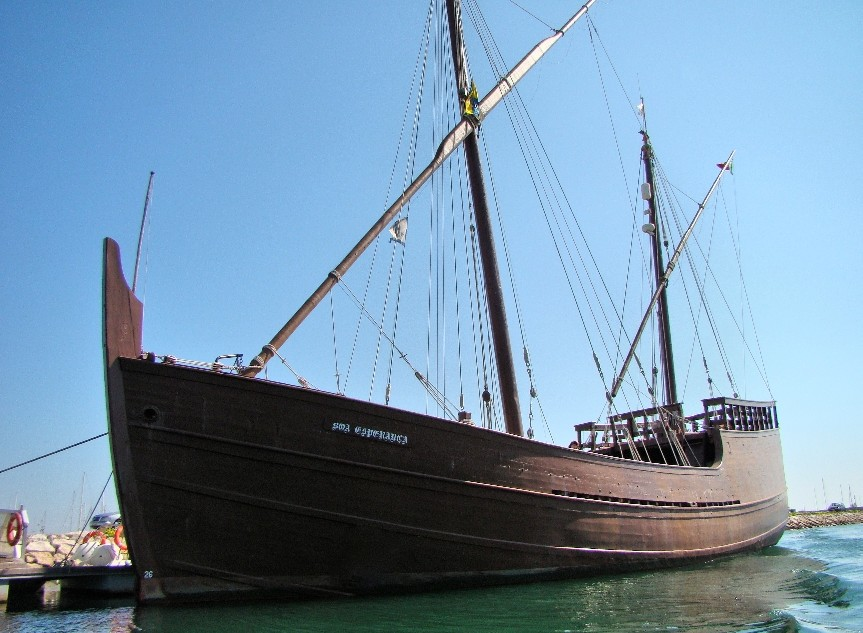
A replica of the caravel Boa Esperança in the city of Lagos, Portugal

== History ==
=== Origins and development ===
The origins of the caravel are in the Mediterranean during the times of the Roman Empire. The lateen sail developed during Roman times, appearing on smaller merchant vessels as early as the 2nd century AD and becoming common by the 5th century. A 2nd-century AD gravestone depicts a quadrilateral variant (the settee), while a 4th-century mosaic shows the triangular lateen that became standard throughout the Middle Ages. The earliest excavated ship reconstructed with a lateen rig dates to ca. 400 AD (Yassi Ada II), with four more attested prior to the Arab advance. The Kelenderis ship mosaic (late 5th to early 6th century) and the Kellia ship graffito from the early 7th century complement this archaeological picture.

During the 5th century AD, the traditional Mediterranean square rig underwent a simplification on cost grounds, removing components like brails and lead rings, which caused some degradation in its performance. Because the alternative lateen sail had fewer component parts, it could compete on build and maintenance costs while maintaining the original performance of the unsimplified square rig. This shift coincided with an innovation in hull construction methods, as shell first planking with pegged tenons started to be replaced by early phases of cost-efficient, frame first carvel construction. Therefore, the transition from the square rig to the lateen rig was driven by construction and maintenance costs rather than a significant difference in sailing performance.

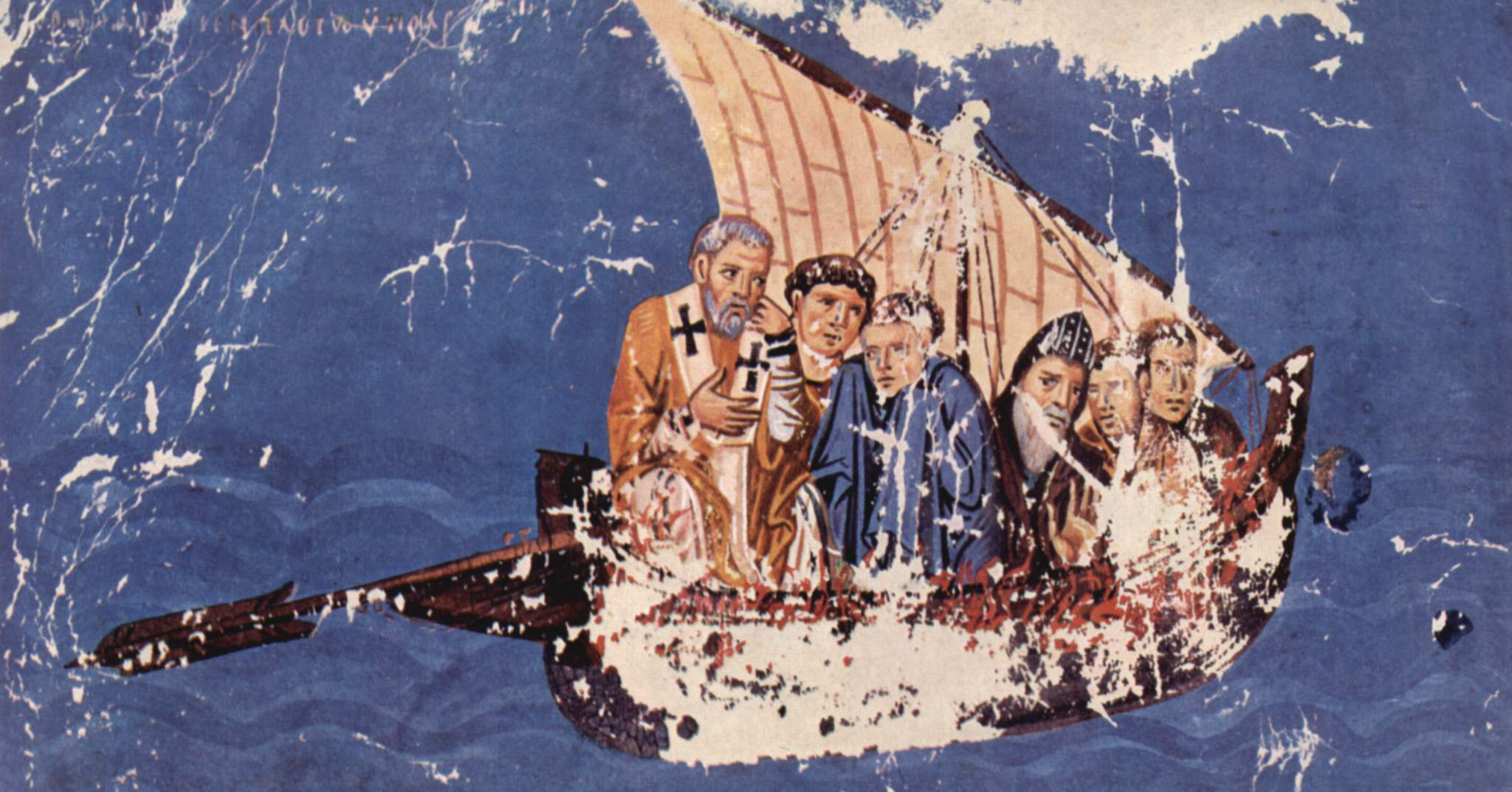
Byzantine ship rigged with settee sail (miniature from c. 880)

By the 6th century, the lateen sail had largely replaced the square sail throughout the Mediterranean, which almost disappeared from regional iconography until the mid-13th century. It became the standard rig of the Byzantine dromon war galley and was likely used by Belisarius' flagship during the 532 AD reconquest of Roman North Africa from the Vandals. Triangular lateens and settees continued to coexist in the middle Byzantine period, as evidenced by Christian iconography, and a recent graffito from the Yenikapı excavations. In the 12th to 13th centuries, the rigging shifted when hook-shaped mastheads made way for a barrel-like crow's nest arrangement.

After the Muslim conquests of the Byzantine Exarchate of Africa, the former Byzantine province of Spania, and the Visigothic Kingdom, these lateen-rigged shipbuilding traditions were maintained by regional shipwrights and crews under the Umayyad and later caliphates, which took over existing ports and shipyards. The Arabs adopted the lateen sail by way of the Copts, which shared the existing Mediterranean maritime tradition and provided the bulk of galley crews for Muslim-led fleets. This is also indicated by the lateen terminology among Arabs, which is derived from Greco-Roman nomenclature. Unequivocal depictions of sailing rigs are rare in early Islamic art, making an 11th-century glazed pottery dish from Saracenic Dénia the earliest securely identifiable example found in the region.

The design of the caravel developed from traditional small, single-masted fishing vessels used in the thirteenth century along the coasts of Galicia, Portugal, and Atlantic Andalusia. These early craft originated when Mediterranean trade networks carried lateen rigging westward through the Strait of Gibraltar, where regional shipwrights merged it with Atlantic boatbuilding practices. They adapted the lateen rig to small, shallow-draft, open boats designed to navigate the rough swells, shifting sandbars, and river mouths of the Atlantic coast.

Initially weighing less than 20 tons and sailed by a five-man crew, these open fishing vessels grew larger throughout the fourteenth century. Historical records from 1307 note caravels of up to 30 tons in Biscay, and by the early fifteenth century, the updated decked versions were widely used across the Iberian Peninsula.

=== Optimization and the Age of Discovery ===
In the mid-to-late fifteenth century, Prince Henry the Navigator of Portugal needed better ships to explore the Atlantic ocean and the African coast. At Sagres, Henry brought together a group of experts in mapmaking, navigation, astronomy, and ship design to build a vessel that could handle the open sea. Before this, European ships relied on rowers, fixed sails, or both; the square-rigged barca was the standard vessel. The new caravel, along with the development of the heavier nao from the older cog (coca), improved long-distance European ocean travel.

The design of the caravel allowed it to sail in difficult winds and open ocean conditions. It became the main vessel used by Portuguese explorers like Diogo Cão, Bartolomeu Dias, and the Corte-Real brothers (Gaspar and Miguel), and was used in Spanish expeditions by Christopher Columbus. They were easier to steer and handle than older designs like the barca and barinel. These explorations helped establish global trade networks and enabled the spice trade for Portugal and Spain. The caravel was an important step in Iberian shipbuilding from 1400 to 1600.

=== Decline and obsolescence ===
While caravels found new trade routes, their small size made them poor cargo ships. They were eventually replaced on commercial trade routes by the much larger carrack (carraca or nao), which could carry more goods and make more money.

In the decades after the Americas were colonized, caravels fell out of use as newer designs appeared. They were replaced by the galleon (galeón), which combined the design of the nao and carrack but was stronger, could carry more weight, and was easier to maneuver.

== Design ==
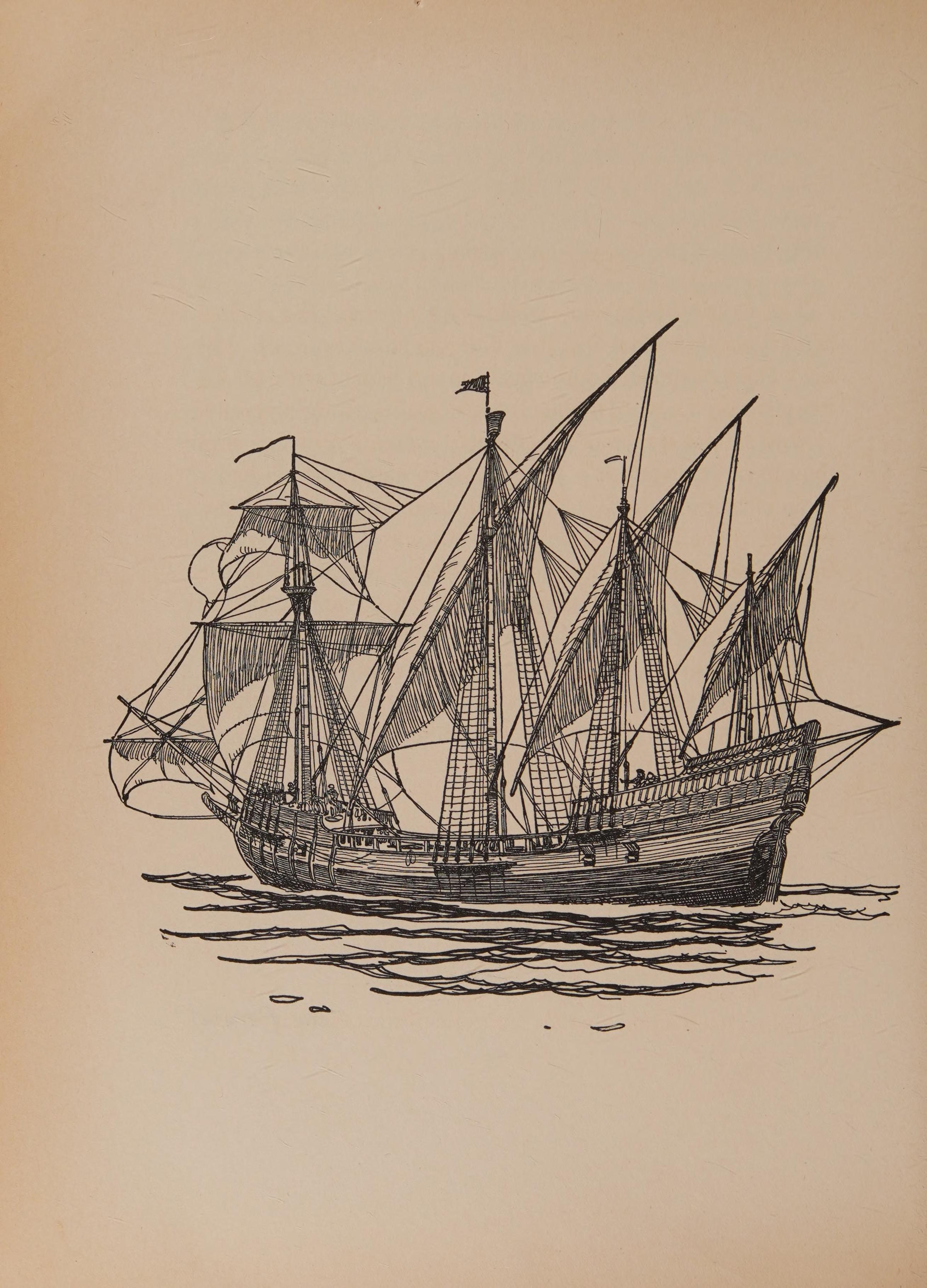
A caravel. Full-page pen-and-ink plate (signed “G.G.”) from The Book of Old Ships by Henry B. Culver, illustrated by Gordon Grant (1924).

The earliest caravels in the thirteenth century were small and are believed to have been un-decked, carrying one mast with lateen sails, while later types were larger and had two or three masts and decks. Caravels such as the caravela tilhlda of the 15th century had an average length of between 12 and 18 m (39 and 59 ft), an average capacity of 50 to 60 tons, a high length-to-beam ratio of around 3.5 to 1, and narrow ellipsoidal frame (unlike the circular frame of the nau), making them very fast and maneuverable but with a limited cargo capacity. It was in such ships that Christopher Columbus set out on his expedition in 1492, while the Santa María was a small carrack of about 150 tons and served as the flagship, the Pinta and Niña were caravels of around 15–20 m with a beam of 6 m and a displacement of around 60–75 tons. The Niña was re-rigged by Columbus with square rig to give better performance on the Atlantic crossing – most of which was following favourable winds, for which lateen was less suitable.

=== Square-rigged caravel ===
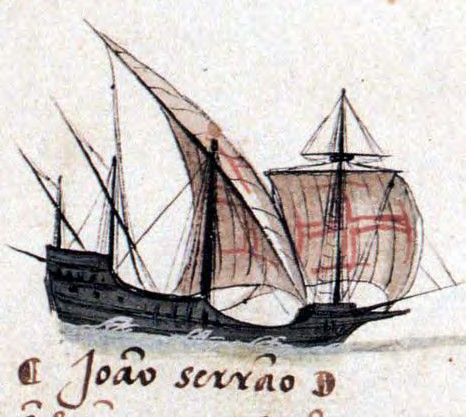
A typical square-rigged caravel (Livro das Armadas)

Towards the end of the 15th century, the Portuguese developed a larger version of the caravel, bearing a forecastle and sterncastle – though not as high as those of a carrack, which would have made it unweatherly – but most distinguishable for its square-rigged foremast, and three other masts bearing lateen rig. In this form it was referred to in Portuguese as a "round caravel" (caravela redonda) as in Iberian tradition, a bulging square sail is said to be round.

It was employed in coast-guard fleets near the Strait of Gibraltar and as an armed escort for merchant ships between Portugal and Brazil and in the Cape Route. Some consider this a forerunner of the fighting galleon and it remained in use until the 17th century.

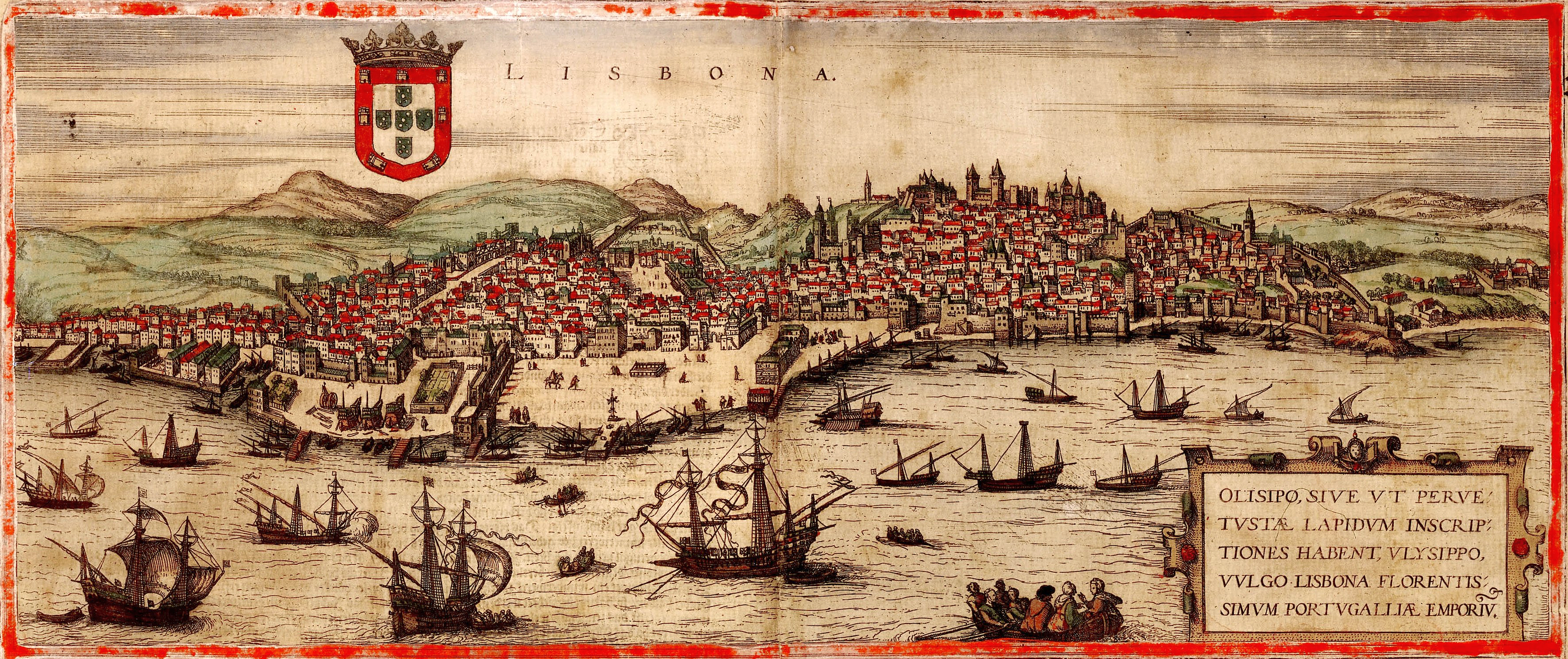
Lisbon, 1572. Galleon (center) surrounded by carracks, galleys, round caravels, and caravels (lateen)

== See also ==
- Carrack, a type of round ship used in voyage to East India
- Iberian ship development, 1400–1600
- Lateen sail

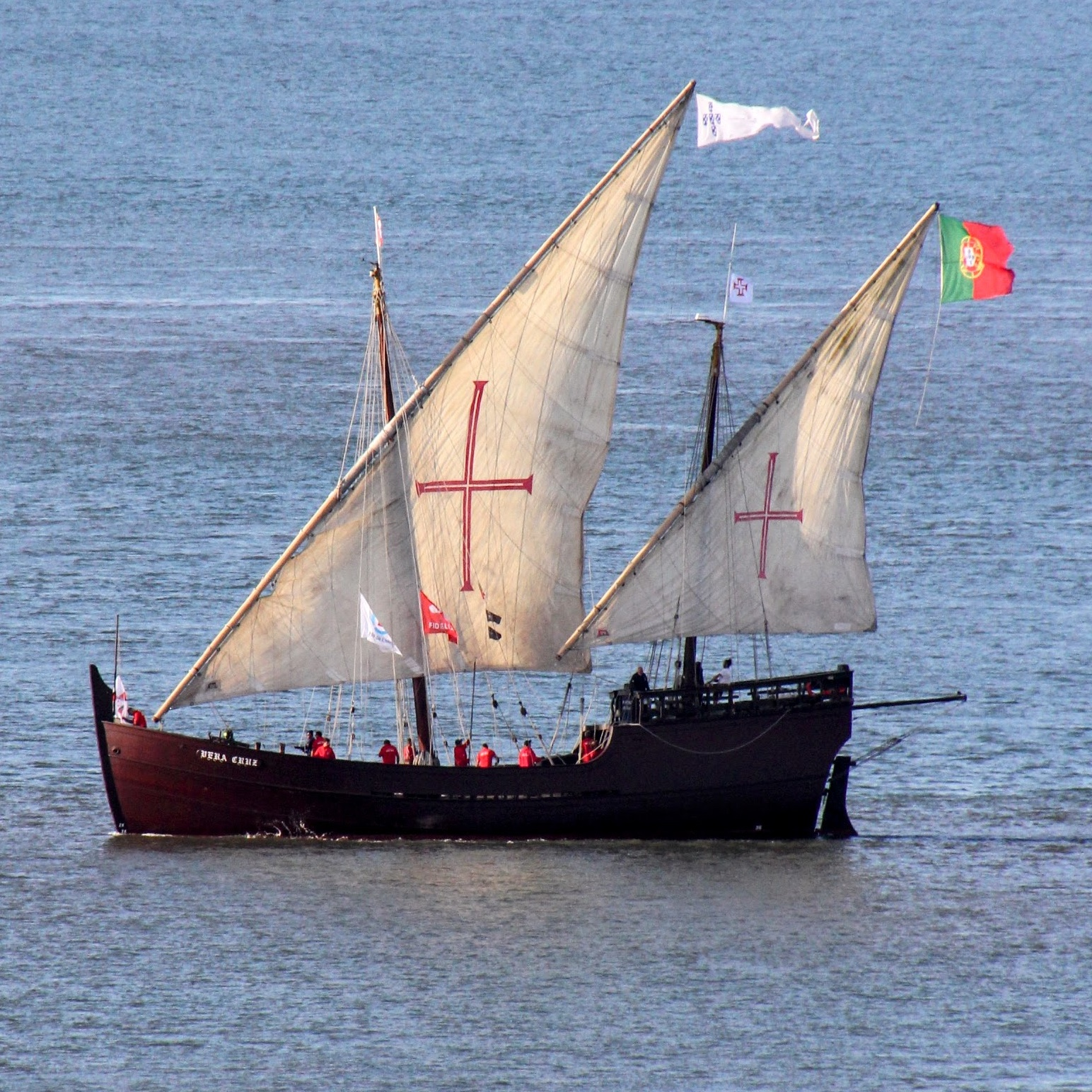
Lateen-rigged caravel. Modern replica.

- Man-of-war
- Molasses Reef Wreck – one of the oldest wrecks of European ships in the Americas, thought to be a caravel
- Notorious – a replica caravel in Australia
- Portuguese India Armadas
- Portuguese man o' war § Etymology
- Square rig

== Sources ==
- Basch, Lucien (2001), "La voile latine, son origine, son évolution et ses parentés arabes", in Tzalas, H. (ed.), Tropis VI, 6th International Symposium on Ship Construction in Antiquity, Lamia 1996 proceedings, Athens: Hellenic Institute for the Preservation of Nautical Tradition, pp. 55–85
- Campbell, I. C. (1995), "The Lateen Sail in World History" (PDF), Journal of World History, vol. 6, no. 1, pp. 1–23, archived from the original (PDF) on 4 August 2016
- Casson, Lionel (1995), Ships and Seamanship in the Ancient World, Johns Hopkins University Press, ISBN 978-0-8018-5130-8
- Castro, F.; Fonseca, N.; Vacas, T.; Ciciliot, F. (2008), "A Quantitative Look at Mediterranean Lateen- and Square-Rigged Ships (Part 1)", The International Journal of Nautical Archaeology, vol. 37, no. 2, pp. 347–359, Bibcode:2008IJNAr..37..347C, doi:10.1111/j.1095-9270.2008.00183.x, S2CID 45072686
- Günsenin, Nergis; Rieth, Éric (2012), "Un graffito de bateau à voile latine sur une amphore (IXe s. ap. J.-C.) du Portus Theodosiacus (Yenikapı)", Anatolia Antiqua, vol. 20, pp. 157–164
- Pomey, Patrice (2006), "The Kelenderis Ship: A Lateen Sail", The International Journal of Nautical Archaeology, vol. 35, no. 2, pp. 326–335, Bibcode:2006IJNAr..35..326P, doi:10.1111/j.1095-9270.2006.00111.x, S2CID 162300888
- White, Lynn (1978), "The Diffusion of the Lateen Sail", Medieval Religion and Technology. Collected Essays, University of California Press, pp. 255–260, ISBN 978-0-520-03566-9
- Whitewright, Julian (2009), "The Mediterranean Lateen Sail in Late Antiquity", The International Journal of Nautical Archaeology, vol. 38, no. 1, pp. 97–104, Bibcode:2009IJNAr..38...97W, doi:10.1111/j.1095-9270.2008.00213.x, S2CID 162352759
- Whitewright, Julian (2011). "The Potential Performance of Ancient Mediterranean Sailing Rigs". International Journal of Nautical Archaeology. 40 (1): 2–17. Bibcode:2011IJNAr..40....2W. doi:10.1111/j.1095-9270.2010.00276.x. S2CID 111007423.
- Whitewright, Julian (2012a). "Technological Continuity and Change: The Lateen Sail of the Medieval Mediterranean". Al-Masāq. 24 (1): 1–19. doi:10.1080/09503110.2012.655580. S2CID 161464823.
- Whitewright, Julian (2012b), "Early Islamic Maritime Technology", in Matthews, R.; Curtis, J.; Gascoigne, A. L. (eds.), Proceedings of the 7th International Congress on the Archaeology of the Ancient Near East. Volume 2: Ancient & Modern Issues in Cultural Heritage, Colour & Light in Architecture, Art & Material Culture, Islamic Archaeology, Wiesbaden: Harrassowitz Verlag, pp. 585–598
