= Iberian ship development, 1400–1600 =

Technological development due to wars

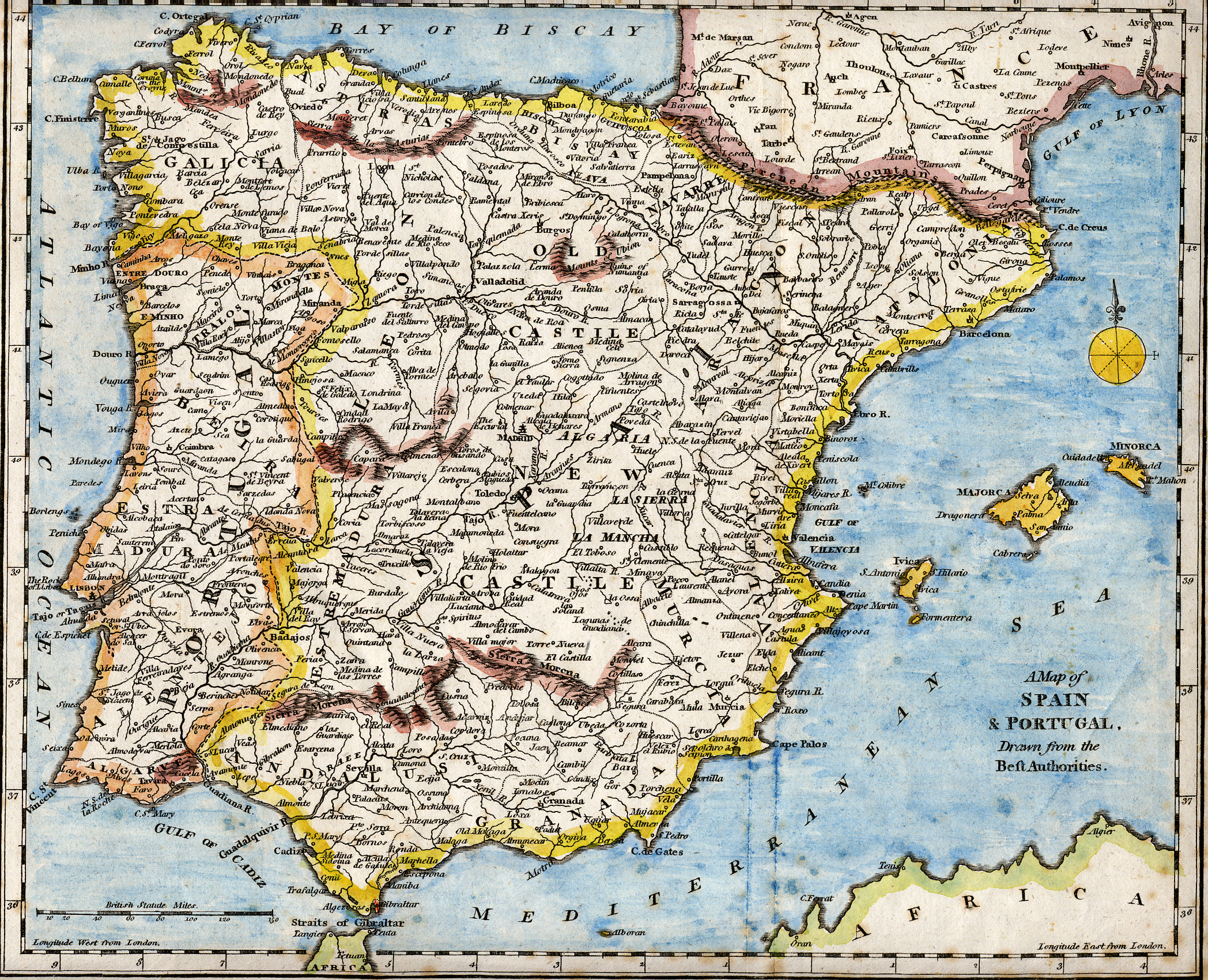
An eighteenth-century map of the peninsula depicting various topographical features of the land, as published in Robert Wilkinson's General Atlas, c. 1794

Due to centuries of constant conflict, warfare and daily life in the Iberian Peninsula were interlinked. Small, lightly equipped armies were maintained at all times. The near-constant state of war resulted in a need for maritime experience, ship technology, power, and organization. This led the Crowns of Aragon, Portugal, and later Castile, to put their efforts into the sea.

Due to geography, Iberian countries had greater access to the sea than did much of Europe; this allowed the Iberian kingdoms to become a people of mariners and traders. These people had the motivation to move; they were close to the wealth of Africa and the Mediterranean. Expansion and development of ship technology were due to commercial, military and religious endeavors.

By 1411, Portugal was no longer fighting Castile. In 1415, it conquered Ceuta, its first overseas colony. The crusades cemented trade and external alliances. Portugal wanted to protect its coast from Muslim raids and secured their base in the Mediterranean. They were able to attack Muslim commerce while taking part in the trade of gold, slaves, and ivory. As a seafaring people in the south-westernmost region of Europe, the Portuguese became natural leaders of exploration during the Middle Ages. Faced with the options of either accessing other European markets by sea, by exploiting its seafaring prowess, or by land, and facing the task of crossing Castile and Aragon territory, it is not surprising that goods were sent via the sea to England, Flanders, Italy and the Hanseatic league towns.

One important reason was the need for alternatives to the expensive eastern trade routes that followed the Silk Road. Those routes were dominated first by the republics of Venice and Genoa, and then by the Ottoman Empire after the conquest of Constantinople in 1453, which barred European access. For decades the ports in the Spanish Netherlands produced more revenue than the colonies, since all goods brought from Spain, Mediterranean possessions, and the colonies were sold directly there to neighbouring European countries: wheat, olive oil, wine, silver, spice, wool and silk were big businesses.

The gold brought home from Guinea stimulated the commercial energy of the Portuguese, and its European neighbors, especially Spain. Apart from their religious and scientific aspects, these voyages of discovery were highly profitable.

They had benefited from Guinea's connections with neighboring Iberians and north African Muslim states. Due to these connections, mathematicians and experts in naval technology appeared in Portugal. Portuguese and foreign experts made several breakthroughs in the fields of mathematics, cartography and naval technology.

In 1434 the first consignment of African slaves was brought to Lisbon; slave trading was the most profitable branch of Portuguese commerce until India was reached. Throughout the fifteenth century, Portuguese explorers sailed the coast of Africa, establishing trading posts for several tradable commodities, as firearms, spices, silver, gold, slaves.

Portugal were able to have a unique evolution of ships because they were on a geographically crucial land area, one that was literally a hinge between Northern and Southern waters. When there was no reason to expand the development of ships, their development was partially stagnant, even though they were not perfected yet. People would utilize mainly two kinds of ships: longships and roundships (dromonds). Longships were reliant on oarsmen and they tended to be used as warships. Roundships, on the other hand, used sails and tended to be used for carrying freight. These ships met the conditions of the sea but not in a perfected sense. The galley (longship) had to be light so that the men could propel it and it had to be long enough so enough men could move the ship. These specifications made it impossible for the ship to be adequately provisioned for a long voyage. As long as the longship was not venturing too far from any given port, she did her job, but clearly for the voyages that would make Spain and Portugal famous, she was simply not cut out for the work. The roundship was able to hold more provisions and she was able to resist more perilous weather than the longship but was impossibly slow, so almost useless as a ship meant to work in warring conditions. These ships were important for their intended jobs, but in no way capable of maritime exploration to distant seas. If Iberians wanted to travel further, they had to utilize different technologies to propel the advancement of ships. Iberian peninsular kingdoms were exposed to both Northern and Southern ships from surrounding states. The Mediterranean tended to rely on triangular lateen sails and the use of actual tools to correct navigation. Lateen sails were such an innovation because they had the ability to carry a ship with even the smallest of breezes. Atlantic sailors tended to utilize a stouter, heavier Baltic cog, lapstrake, planked cargo ship with a single square sail that had axial stern rudders that was meant to help in the stormy waters they were accustomed to.

== Background ==
The cultural context of the Iberian Peninsula was different from that of the rest of Continental Europe from the Middle Ages, due to contact with Moorish culture and the isolation provided by the Pyrenees. Doctrines, equipment, and tactics differed from those found in the rest of Europe.

The forces were capable of quickly moving long distances, allowing a quick return home after battle. Wars were fought mainly at borders, in no man's land, where skirmishers lived, people who were used to a life of sacking enemy posts and villages. On land, these wars combined some European methods with techniques from Muslim raiders in Al-Andalus. These tactics consisted of small groups who attempted to catch their opponents by surprise, through an ambush. In Mombasa Vasco de Gama resorted to piracy, looting Arab merchant ships, which were generally unarmed trading vessels without heavy cannons.

There were obstacles to work around, such as the dependence on wood for the construction of ships. Geography benefited Portugal by allowing them open access to the water and a suitable coast for ports, but they also had to deal with scarce forests from which to procure trees. In order to encourage shipbuilders, the government would give specific subsidies to certain areas. This was the case in Lisbon, where the government completely eliminated the tax on trees from the royal forest, for trees that would be made into ships that would be over one hundred tons. Fewer numbers of trees meant that the people working on the construction would not be allotted room for mistakes, so the ships being newly built were clearly being built with the newest of ship technologies which led to the development of Portuguese expansion through the water.

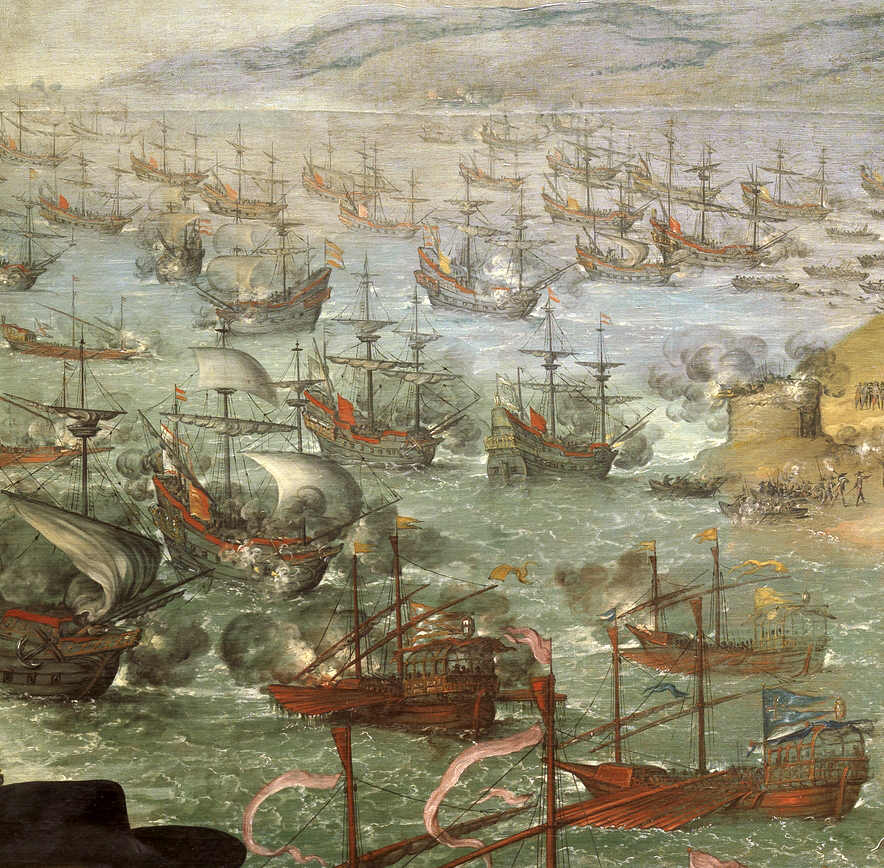
Defense of Cádiz against the English (detail), by Francisco de Zurbarán.

Spain had an easier time with shipbuilding because it was more forested than Portugal. This is not to say that Spain had a limitless supply of trees, but it did allow them more room for ship variation. Spain did not direct its people to fell trees because of their desire for tree conservation; this was because of the assumed necessity for firewood, and the need for trees to provide acorns and shelter for cattle. The Spanish monarchy urged people to replace the trees that they cut down by encouraging that for every one felled, two seeds should be planted. What unfortunately tended to occur was the simple transplanting of trees to areas with recently cut down forests. This often resulted in trees that died because they were not able to properly adjust to the new environment. It was not until the 1560s and 1570s that Philip II began to show actual interest in the timber for shipbuilding and began allocating definite numbers of oaks trees that needed to be set in certain districts. There were definite laws that were being enforced with special forest guards that reported directly to the king; this even resulted in some corporations pleading poverty. The Spanish were excellent shipbuilders; later on in the century, ships themselves were used as items of commerce. The English alone have records of buying six galleons from the Spanish in order to build up their own fleet. Even with a dwindling supply of trees, the profitable avenue of shipbuilding encouraged construction. Shipbuilding became integrated into the Spanish economy; areas specialized. Seville, for example, was known for the repairing of ships, the manufacture of sails and the making of biscuits and casks for shipyard provisions. These commercial interests financed the continual development of ships. As long as there was a need for better, faster, stronger ships, people were able to improve technologies, therefore making it more probable for ships to be able to venture further from the shore and eventually across an entire ocean.

Long before Castile, Portugal had colonized the Atlantic islands, Madeira, the Azores, Cape Verde, Sao Tome... it had established a marine route circling Africa, with numerous coastal enclaves along the route.

Iberian mare clausum claims during the Age of Discovery

With the colonization of the Atlantic islands and the African enclaves, Portugal had enough forests to build its fleet and income to finance the construction. For example, Madeira island, literally Wood island, was uninhabited and covered with hardwood virgin forest when it was discovered and colonised.

Besides coastal exploration, Portuguese ships also made trips further out to gather meteorological and oceanographic information. These voyages revealed the archipelagoes of Bissagos Islands where the Portuguese were defeated by native people in 1535, Trindade and Martim Vaz, Saint Peter and Saint Paul Archipelago, Fernando de Noronha, Corisco, Elobey Grande, Elobey Chico Annobón Island, Ascension Island, Bioko Island, Falkland Islands, Príncipe Island, Saint Helena Island, Tristan da Cunha Island and Sargasso Sea.

The knowledge of wind patterns and currents, the trade winds and the oceanic gyres in the Atlantic, and the determination of latitude led to the discovery of the best ocean route back from Africa: crossing the Central Atlantic to the Azores, using the winds and currents that spin clockwise in the Northern Hemisphere because of atmospheric circulation and the effect of Coriolis, facilitating the way to Lisbon and thus enabling the Portuguese to venture farther from shore, a maneuver that became known as the "volta do mar" (English: return of the sea). In 1565, the application of this principle in the Pacific Ocean led the Spanish making the Manila Galleon trade route.

There were other factors that counteracted Iberian domination. Whether traveling up the rivers in Africa or encountering the indigenous populations in the New World, both these groups had easily maneuverable canoes that could put lots of pressure on the Portuguese and Spanish. Natives could sail up close to caravels and heavily attack them with projectiles, and then escape before Iberian ships could position themselves in an ideal fighting distance.

== Ship design ==
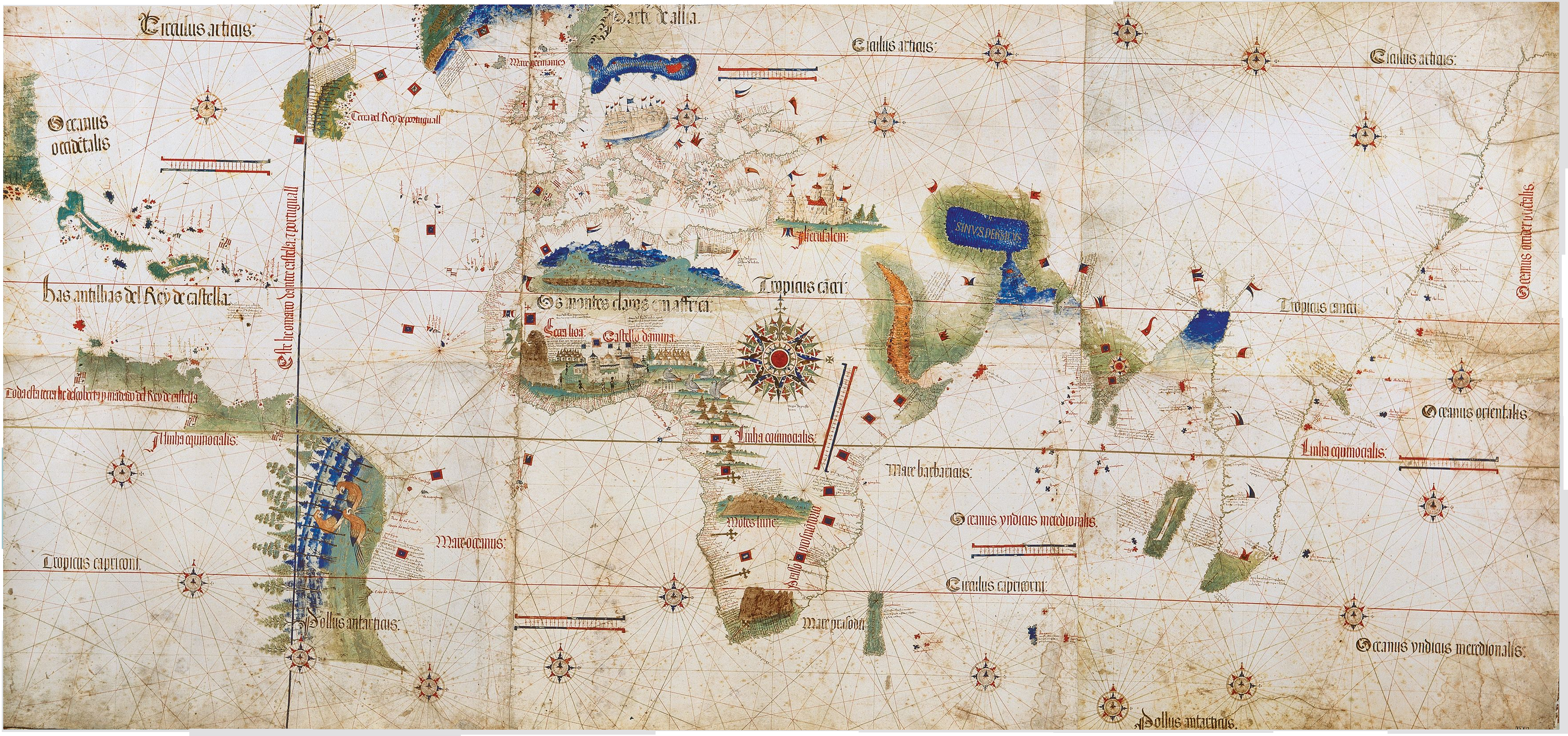
Cantino planisphere 1502, earliest surviving chart showing the explorations of Columbus to Central America, Corte-Real to Newfoundland, Gama to India and Cabral to Brazil. Tordesillas line depicted, Biblioteca Estense, Modena

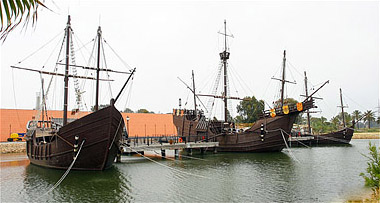
Replicas of La Niña, La Pinta and La Santa María at Palos de la Frontera, Spain

The ship that launched the first phase of the discoveries along the African coast was the Portuguese caravel. Since its development was a gradual transition and far from any unilineal model, the predecessors and birthplace of the caravel may never be known for certain, but it likely evolved from some kind of tending or coastal craft in the Mediterranean. It is clear from historical records that there were Portuguese caravels used as fishing vessels in the 13th century Iberians quickly adopted it for their merchant navy. They were agile and easier to navigate, with a tonnage of 50 to 160 tons and 1 to 3 masts, with lateen triangular sails allowing luffing. The caravel particularly benefited from a greater capacity to tack. The limited capacity for cargo and crew were their main drawbacks, but this did not hinder their success. Limited crew and cargo space was acceptable, initially, because as exploratory ships, their "cargo" was what was in the explorer's discoveries about a new territory, which only took up the space of one person. Among the famous caravels are Berrio and Caravela Annunciation. Columbus also used them in his travels.

Long oceanic voyages led to larger ships. "Nau" was the Portuguese archaic synonym for any large ship, primarily merchant ships. Due to the piracy that plagued the coasts, they began to be used in the navy and were provided with cannon ports, which led to the classification of a nau according to the power of its artillery. The carrack or nau was a three- or four-masted ship. It had a high rounded stern with large aftcastle, forecastle and bowsprit at the stem. It was first used by the Portuguese, and later by the Spanish. They were also adapted to the increasing maritime trade. They grew from 200 tons capacity in the fifteenth century to 500. In the sixteenth century they usually had two decks, stern castles fore and aft, two to four masts with overlapping sails. Voyages to India in the sixteenth century used carracks, large merchant ships with a high edge and three masts with square sails, that reached 2,000 tons.

People interested included merchants looking for profitable trade, people who were not initially dreaming of traveling over the vast expanses of the ocean. Merchants were agents of change. They desired stronger vessels that were most efficient with the most cargo possible. Traders desired large ships because they were harder to attack and they could carry bulk commodities cheaply. The problem with these huge vessels: they had a long turnaround rate, which was less profitable and when smaller ships started arming themselves with artillery, large ships became vulnerable. Also these ships often cost the modern equivalent of US$2 million to build. What is important to note is that need facilitated change. By the fifteenth and sixteenth centuries, merchants began to start favoring smaller ships. They went from heavy to a lighter sailing craft. This was around the same time that people began realizing their potential to explore further off the coasts.

Ship change depends on the purpose; technologies do not invent themselves without a demand. What may have begun as commercial enterprises eventually shifted to voyages of discovery. Distant trade wants meant that development of better ships was expected. Stable ships that could be controlled by a limited number of sailors, small enough to be easily maneuverable along the coast and in rivers, yet big enough to carry provisions and trade goods across long distances, were needed. New ship developments were needed for merchants and as ships improved people realized they had potential to explore. And once people knew they had a desire to explore, ships changed their function as well. Ships for exploration had one main job: to carry an explorer's feedback, they did not have to carry a merchant's goods or a warrior's guns. This realization was huge because it meant that ship engineers now had a specific purpose for their newest construction projects. They started adapting the Mediterranean roundship that relied on a single, square rig on the mainmast and they slowly began increasing the cargo tonnage. By the fifteenth century one can easily see the transformation as ships went from single to multi-rigged and they started having a heavier reliance on artillery. This is evidence for a nice hybrid between commercial and military ships. Technologies were being communicated more readily and this led to regional differences in ships slowly becoming less distinct. When looking in a textbook one may see an array of multiple names for ships in this century, but in reality many of these ships were fundamentally the same. With a common purpose fitted to ships, which was the exploration of new territories and the expansion of the crown, ships were more uniformly designed and common patterns emerged.

By the fifteenth and sixteenth centuries, the main ships in use were the caravels and naus (carrack). Caravels are unique because they are an ‘evolved’ ship. They started as a small, open boat that was used by coastal merchants and fisherman. Once the boat started to be used for more than trade and fishing, it was realized that it needed to be built for the sea rather than cargo. The nau was built with more beams. It was larger and considered a “workhorse” that was able to carry colonists, arms, tools and provisions. The nau was a clear contrast with the caravel mainly due to its higher state of utility, minus the speed of the caravel. These ships are what propelled Spain and Portugal to split the world between themselves. This high development of technology that drew upon past innovations allowed for the further expansion and exploration of uncharted waters without any inhibitions.

== Caravels and their purposeful evolution ==
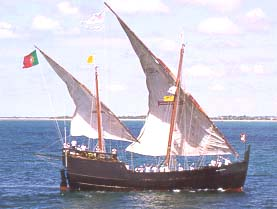
A lateen-rigged caravel, Caravela Latina

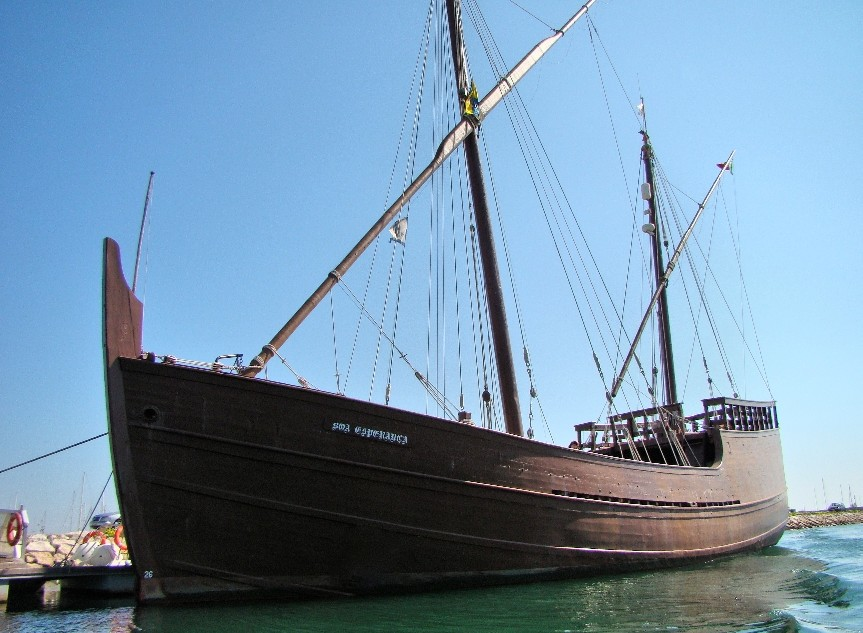
A replica of the caravel Boa Esperança in the city of Lagos, Portugal

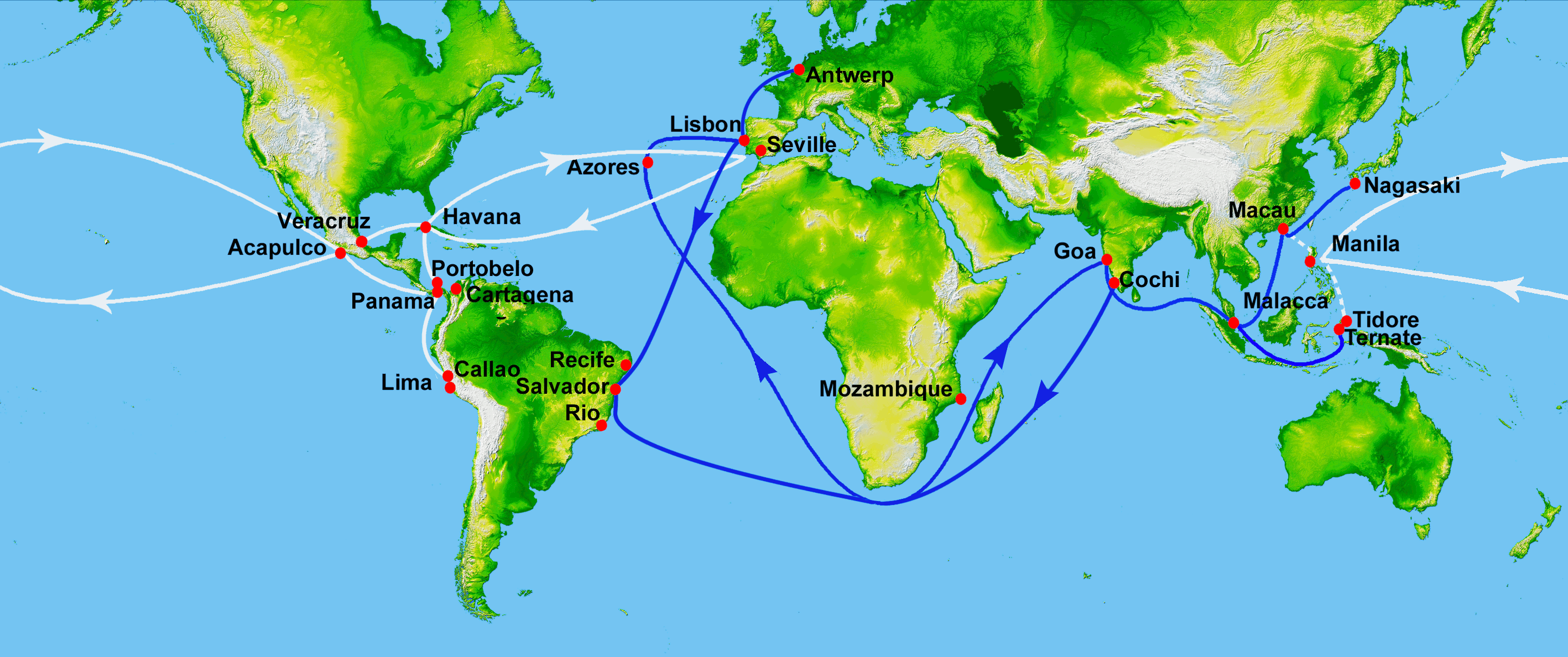
Portuguese trade routes (blue) and Spanish trade routes (white)

The origin of their name holds some controversy, though it is strongly supported that caravel comes from the Greek word Καραβος, meaning light vessel."The vessel so named which had a real celebrity in the fifteenth and sixteenth centuries, the vessel employed by the Portuguese in their voyages of discovery and by Christopher Columbus in his daring adventure to the westward, was a small structure belonging to the family of roundships but more graceful in shape than its contemporaries, the nefs, and having narrower quarters. It was a faster sailer, more able, and was better fitted for all enterprises demanding speed and rapid maneuvering." It had square sterns, fore and after castles and fairly high bulwarks, a bowsprit and usually four masts. It is hard to specifically look at the rig because depending on the period and the nationality, the rig was subject to change. The early caravels did not have square sails, though later, square sails were carried on the foremast for running or for bad weather. The most identifiable rig was a four mast vessel with a square-rigged foremast raking far forward and having a round top and three lateen-rigged masts gradually decreasing in size. Looking at exceptions may show that mainmasts occasionally carried a roundtop similar to what was on a foremast. Another type of caravel was with four masts but lateen and square sails were arranged so that the first and fourth masts were lateen sails while the second and third masts were square sails. These varieties of ships changed based on exploration while most of them were around an eighty-ton range.

Caravels were designed specifically to outmaneuver previous ships. They were meant for nimble and shallow trips. Initially they went quite short in distance and duration. As voyages got longer, caravels began relying on larger storing ships that would be able to join them. They needed a ship that would be a huge storehouse of supplies as well as be able to have the consolidated power of a caravel, hence the invention of naus.

Caravels and naus created an unmatchable team for explorers. Columbus used one nau, La Santa María, and two caravels, La Pinta and La Niña, on his journey across the Atlantic. It was so successful because it had defensive armaments and the team was highly maneuverable; they were similar to floating batteries of firepower. Vasco da Gama saw the success of Columbus and in 1497 he followed Dias's lead to India using two newly constructed naus, each weighing in at one hundred tons, and one caravel, weighing in at fifty tons. By 1502 he went on another journey using ten naus and five armed caravels to go to the East African coast. These newly designed ships easily tore apart Islamic dhows. Following this pattern, Magellan had a fleet of five naus, though only one made it back on the return journey.

It is helpful to look at caravels in three phases of maritime vessels: early caravels, exploring caravels and fleet caravels. Before the Spanish and Portuguese began their discoveries, caravels were small and unable to leave the sight of shore. Some of them did not even have decks. The next phase was the exploratory caravels. As Iberians began questing for more than what was immediately tradable off their own shores, they began experimenting more with ships so that gold, slaves, ivory and spices could be part of the Iberian world. Before the caravel was perfected, Iberians were relying on multiple ships: the barcha and barineles. These were in common use by the 15th century and were drawn upon to round Bojador, which took twelve years and fifteen voyages to complete. Both of these ships were utilized to continue further down the African coast. The barcha weighed in at around twenty-five to thirty tons; it was partially decked and was considered a sailing vessel although it could be rowed with the fourteen to fifteen men that usually could fill the capacity of the ship. The barinel was similar, though slightly larger. These ships were influential in their time, but the problem was that they tended to be slow and unmanageable for exploration. When these ships would make their way but up the coast when returning from Africa, it was difficult for them to fight the northeast winds. Even the addition of square sails and oars was found to be too slow. Technology changes when people demand it to; there was a need for larger crews, provisions and trading truck, not to mention a desire for more maneuverability.

When people began to realize that they had specific needs that barchas and barineles were not fulfilling, that is when they started drawing on aspects of the caravel. It was realized that the caravel's shallow draft was good for riverine commerce and that is when they started understanding that the caravel, if adapted properly, would be beneficial for deeper exploration. A windward vessel was a must, so triangular sails that would allow better access to the wind were drawn upon for the revamping of the explorative ship. Part of how the Portuguese were able to build better ships was by creating hybrids of what they had seen. The caravela Latina combined their Arab conquests with what Iberians had seen in Egypt to make a ship that was longer, larger, lighter and more sophisticated than what had ever been used before. A typical caravel was fifty plus tons, twenty to thirty meters in length and six to eight meters in breadth, the lateen sails were rigged on two-thirds tall masts and occasionally no bowsprit. These adjustments made it possible to increase the speed and the crew, but at the expense of cargo space and war capabilities. People learned that what may have been of benefit going up the coast of Africa was not useful for Atlantic voyages. There was a demand for better technology so the caravela redonda was engineered. It consisted of adding three masts so there would be an increased steering ability, a new rig for ocean sailing and square sails. These improvements made it possible to sail the entire Atlantic without as much uncertainty.

These initial exploratory vessels were not the end of the caravel's evolution. The caravela redonda continued to increase in size, as well as having a rigging system that became even more complex. The caravel now had three or four masts, bowsprit and topsails, and now included a crow's nest. These transformations were another phase of the caravels, and by this time they were considered caravelas de armada. This means that they were owned by the state or employed by military commanders. A variation was the caravela de mexerguerira; it was a messenger ship that was meant to transmit orders within the fleet. There was a continual change in ships because they all held different purposes. Caravels are almost universally known for their lateen sails, yet with the caravela en la modal Andalucia, the lateen sails were abandoned and its forecastle produced a higher bow. These ships allowed for a different type of movement that was better adjusted for the Atlantic Ocean. Spain was such a formidable power on the Atlantic and the Mediterranean because it knew how to adapt its ships to fit the purpose and environment they were sailing in, whether it was galleys for war or a different craft for exploration. By the end of the seventeenth century, caravels were no longer being used as a main ship for exploration. They were ships that remained for the fishermen of Galicia, while new ships like the pataches began to replace them because they were fast, small, and easy for reconnaissance.

== Naus ==
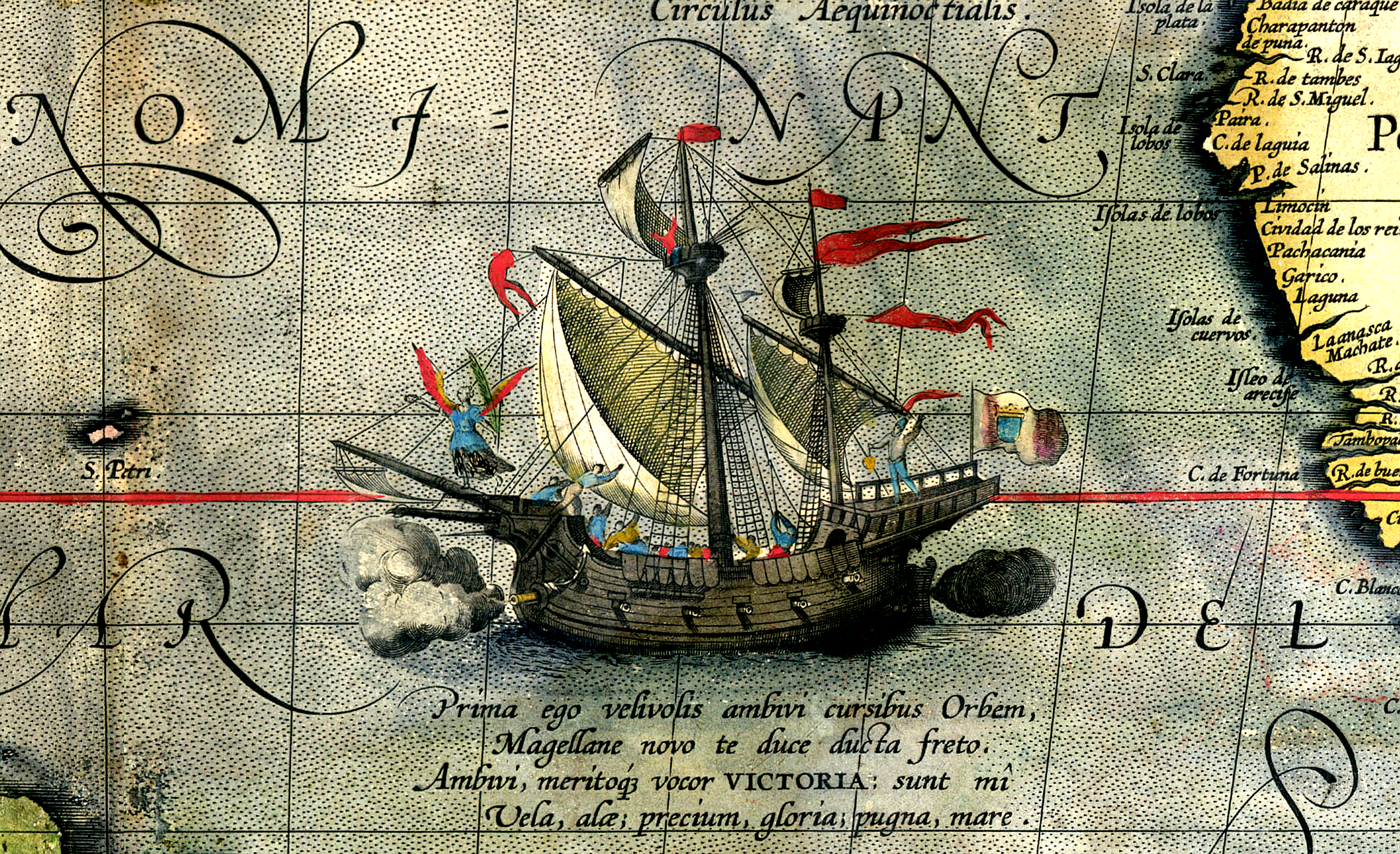
The nau Victoria of Magellan

As glorious as the caravel may have been, its light nature meant that it was susceptible to volatile ocean conditions. As journeys became longer, explorers made greater demands of the ships, so the caravel got a new partner: the nau. This vessel was designed to carry larger amounts of weaponry and cargo while still maintaining reasonable speed and durability. The hull and rig were more sophisticated than previous ships and this allowed for there to be more ease on the ocean. This form was not alien from the caravel, it was an improved version. It was able to sit high in the water; this was a hybrid idea from earlier roundships, which allowed the entire vessel to be roomier. These ships had forward masts and topsails with a crow's nest, while still mixing in lateen mizzens and square mainsails. There was a demand for a more seaworthy ship that still had the perks of the caravel, so the nau was engineered.

In English literature naus are often mistaken for carracks, a common military ship in Britain during the early fifteenth century. Carracks were smaller ships, neither suitable for high seas nor suitable for freight.

== Galleons ==
The seas carried more than explorers. Commercial trade propelled new technologies to improve ships, but another factor was for military reasons. Military conquest was a motivation; the scale of war increased to an unprecedented amount in the sixteenth century. Countries needed to prove their military might to show that they could maintain their sovereignty. Military means was also for expansion and coercion. One of the best vessels for that was the galleon, which was primarily used as a war vessel. It was built in the sixteenth and seventeenth centuries. In addition to their use as warships, galleons were also used for transporting treasure and cargo from the Americas.

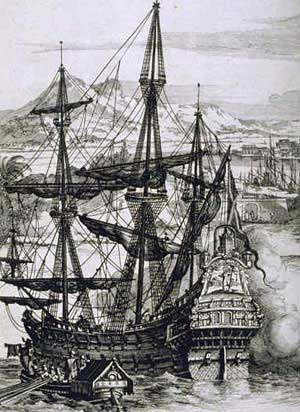
A Spanish galleon

It is important to notice the differences that began to develop with the galleon versus other ships of the time, such as the capital ship, because it was made to act more efficiently in a time of war, such as having fewer decks which helped make them more graceful in the water, not to mention easier to handle for sailors. This does not mean it was the perfect design; it was large and cumbersome, and as learned in 1588, these ships were easily outmaneuvered by the English navy's lighter and swifter ships. Galleons had three divisions (levels) whereas great ships had four. Another difference is the form of the head; the galleon was not long and projecting forecastle like many of the larger ships that sailed during this time. Instead the galleon's forecastle ended at her stern. It had an elongated and slimmer beck, which was comparable to a galley, which means that it projected forward. The transom of the stern was square and the poop deck narrow. One can specifically look at the region of Spain and Portugal with more variations, such as the skids were meant to strengthen the sides. The fore and mainmasts were made with round tops and were capable of carrying courses and topsails in addition to having one or two lateen mizzens. In short, “the galleon was three-masted and square rigged, usually with two decks, and with its main batteries in broadsides.” These ships were unique at the time because they were made with the specific purpose of going to war, and, because that was their job, they were made to be most efficient on the sea while catering to the needs of soldiers and sailors.

After the failure of the Spanish Armada, the galleon lost much prestige; by the seventeenth century new ships were already being designed that would better fit the needs of the Iberian empires. New demands led to new ship technologies. Developments of shipbuilding were adjusted to fit the time and the motivations of the state, though a definite decline in shipbuilding occurred as the Iberian empires adjusted to more internal conflicts.

== See also ==
- Age of Discovery
- Caravel
- Galleon
- Carrack
