= Karadere, Aydıncık =

Karadere
- Neighbourhood
- Location in Turkey
- Coordinates: 36°10′N 33°13′E
- Country: Turkey
- Province: Mersin
- District: Aydıncık
- Elevation: 170 m (560 ft)
- Population (2022): 223
- Time zone: UTC+3 (TRT)
- Postal code: 33847
- Area code: 0324

Karadere is a neighbourhood in the municipality and district of Aydıncık, Mersin Province, Turkey. Its population is 223 (2022). Distance to Aydıncık is 27 kilometres (17 mi) and to Mersin is 202 kilometres (126 mi). The village is situated in the Taurus Mountains. The village was once a part of Yenikaş village at the Mediterranean Sea coast. Vegetable farming and animal breeding are the main economic activities of the village.
