= Karaseki =

Karaseki can refer to:

- Karaseki, Aydıncık
- Karaseki, Bucak
