= Myus (Cilicia) =

Town in ancient Cilicia

Coordinates: 36°08′09″N 33°17′31″E

Myus or Myous (Ancient Greek: Μυούς) was a town on the coast of ancient Cilicia, between Nagidus and Celenderis. William Smith conjectured it to be the same place as the Myanda or Mysanda mentioned by Pliny the Elder; and if so, also identical with the town of Mandane (Μανδάνη) mentioned in Stadiasmus Maris Magni as between Celenderis and Cape Pisidium or Posidium (modern Kızıl Burun), from which it was only 7 stadia distant. Modern scholarship tentatively accepts the identity with Myanda/Mysanda but rejects that of Mandane.

Myus is tentatively located near Yenikaş in Asiatic Turkey.
