= Teknecik (disambiguation) =

Teknecik can refer to:

- Teknecik
- Teknecik, Horasan
- Teknecik, Refahiye
