= Pembecik, Aydıncık =

Pembecik
- Neighbourhood
- Location in Turkey
- Coordinates: 36°15′N 33°13′E
- Country: Turkey
- Province: Mersin
- District: Aydıncık
- Elevation: 760 m (2,490 ft)
- Population (2022): 400
- Time zone: UTC+3 (TRT)
- Postal code: 33847
- Area code: 0324

Pembecik is a neighbourhood in the municipality and district of Aydıncık, Mersin Province, Turkey. Its population is 400 (2022). Distance to Aydıncık is 18 kilometres (11 mi) and to Mersin is 190 kilometres (120 mi). The village is situated in the Taurus Mountains. Main agricultural products of the village are greenhouse vegetables.
