= Hacıbahattin =

- Neighbourhood
- Location in Turkey
- Coordinates: 36°10′32″N 33°21′26″E
- Country: Turkey
- Province: Mersin
- District: Aydıncık
- Elevation: 60 m (200 ft)
- Population (2022): 1,614
- Time zone: UTC+3 (TRT)
- Postal code: 33847
- Area code: 0324

Hacıbahattin is a neighbourhood in the municipality and district of Aydıncık, Mersin Province, Turkey. Its population is 1,614 (2022). It is situated on the road connecting Aydıncık to Gülnar. Distance to Aydıncık is 5 kilometres (3.1 mi) and to Mersin is 175 kilometres (109 mi). The main economic sector is vegetable and fruit farming.
