= Yeniyürükkaş =

- Neighbourhood
- Location in Turkey
- Coordinates: 36°14′N 33°19′E
- Country: Turkey
- Province: Mersin
- District: Aydıncık
- Elevation: 700 m (2,300 ft)
- Population (2022): 81
- Time zone: UTC+3 (TRT)
- Postal code: 33847
- Area code: 0324

Yeniyürükkaş is aneighbourhood in the municipality and district of Aydıncık, Mersin Province, Turkey. Its population is 81 (2022). Distance to Aydıncık is 20 kilometres (12 mi) and to Mersin is 195 kilometres (121 mi). The village is situated in the Taurus Mountains.
