= Duruhan =

- Neighbourhood
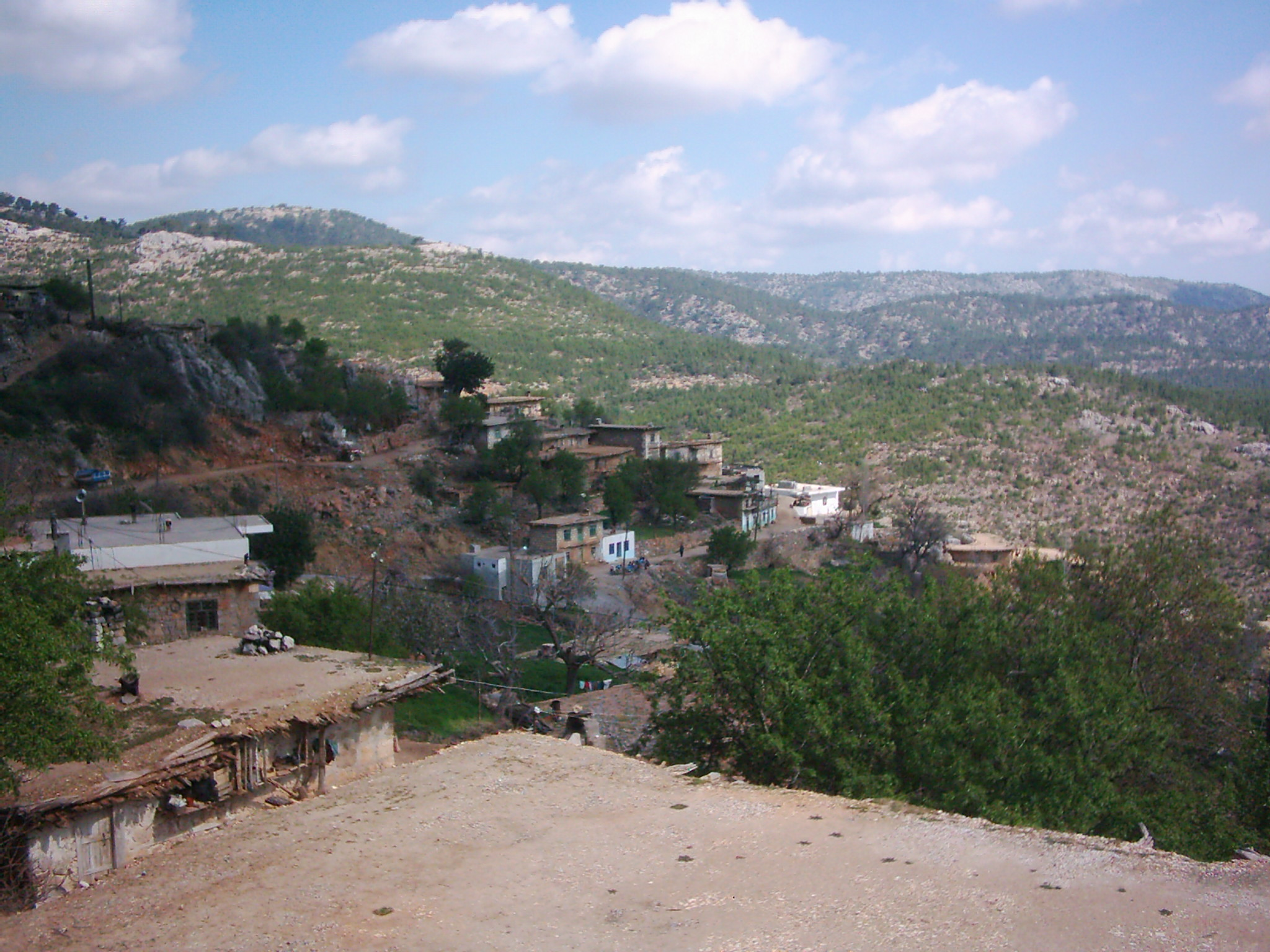

- Location within Turkey
- Coordinates: 36°14′N 33°18′E
- Country: Turkey
- Province: Mersin
- District: Aydıncık
- Elevation: 610 m (2,000 ft)
- Population (2022): 342
- Time zone: UTC+3 (TRT)
- Postal code: 33847
- Area code: 0324

Duruhan is a neighbourhood in the municipality and district of Aydıncık, Mersin Province, Turkey. Its population is 342 (2022). It is a mountain village. The distance to Aydıncık is 17 kilometres (11 mi) and to Mersin is 190 kilometres (120 mi).
