= Yeniyürük =

- Neighbourhood
- Location in Turkey
- Coordinates: 36°14′N 33°22′E
- Country: Turkey
- Province: Mersin
- District: Aydıncık
- Elevation: 675 m (2,215 ft)
- Population (2022): 391
- Time zone: UTC+3 (TRT)
- Postal code: 33847
- Area code: 0324

Yeniyürük is a neighbourhood in the municipality and district of Aydıncık, Mersin Province, Turkey. Its population is 391 (2022). Its name ("new Yörük") refers to the fact that the village was founded by Yörüks who settled during the Seljuks (or Anatolian Beyliks) era (in contrast to Yörüks of the 9th century) The distance to Aydıncık is 20 kilometres (12 mi) and to Mersin 195 kilometres (121 mi). The village is situated in the Toros Mountains.
