= Carabus (boat) =

Small coracle or boat made of wicker-work

Carabus (Ancient Greek: κάραβος and καράβιον) was a small coracle or boat made of wicker-work, and covered with rawhides. The Caravel and the modern Greek καράβι, which means vessel, derives from carabus.

These boats could be moved by short oars. Ancient authors wrote that carabus were used in the River Po.

Caesar described such boats as employed by him in Spain, from having seen it in Britain.
