= Eskiyürük =

- Neighbourhood
- Location in Turkey
- Coordinates: 36°15′N 33°22′E
- Country: Turkey
- Province: Mersin
- District: Aydıncık
- Elevation: 730 m (2,400 ft)
- Population (2022): 627
- Time zone: UTC+3 (TRT)
- Postal code: 33847
- Area code: 0324

Eskiyürük, is a neighbourhood in the municipality and district of Aydıncık, Mersin Province, Turkey. Its population is 627 (2022). It is located 14 kilometres (8.7 mi) from Aydıncık and 185 kilometres (115 mi) from Mersin. The village is situated in the Taurus Mountains, not far from Mediterranean Sea (about 12 kilometres (7.5 mi). The name of the village is a composite word; eski means "old" and Yürük refers to Turkmen people. The main agricultural products of the village are greenhouse vegetables.
