= Yenikaş =

- Neighbourhood
- Location in Turkey
- Coordinates: 36°08′N 33°17′E
- Country: Turkey
- Province: Mersin
- District: Aydıncık
- Elevation: 60 m (200 ft)
- Population (2022): 1,016
- Time zone: UTC+3 (TRT)
- Postal code: 33847
- Area code: 0324

Yenikaş is a neighbourhood in the municipality and district of Aydıncık, Mersin Province, Turkey. Its population is 1,016 (2022). It is a coastal village on state highway D.400. Distance to Aydıncık is 4 kilometres (2.5 mi) and to Mersin is 174 kilometres (108 mi). According to Sir Francis Beaufort, the village was situated in an ancient settlement named Melanie by Strabo, but modern scholarship points to the site being that of Myus. The village was founded by once nomadic Karakeçili tribe of Turkmens.
