= Aydıncık mosaic =

Medieval floor mosaic in Mersin Province, Turkey

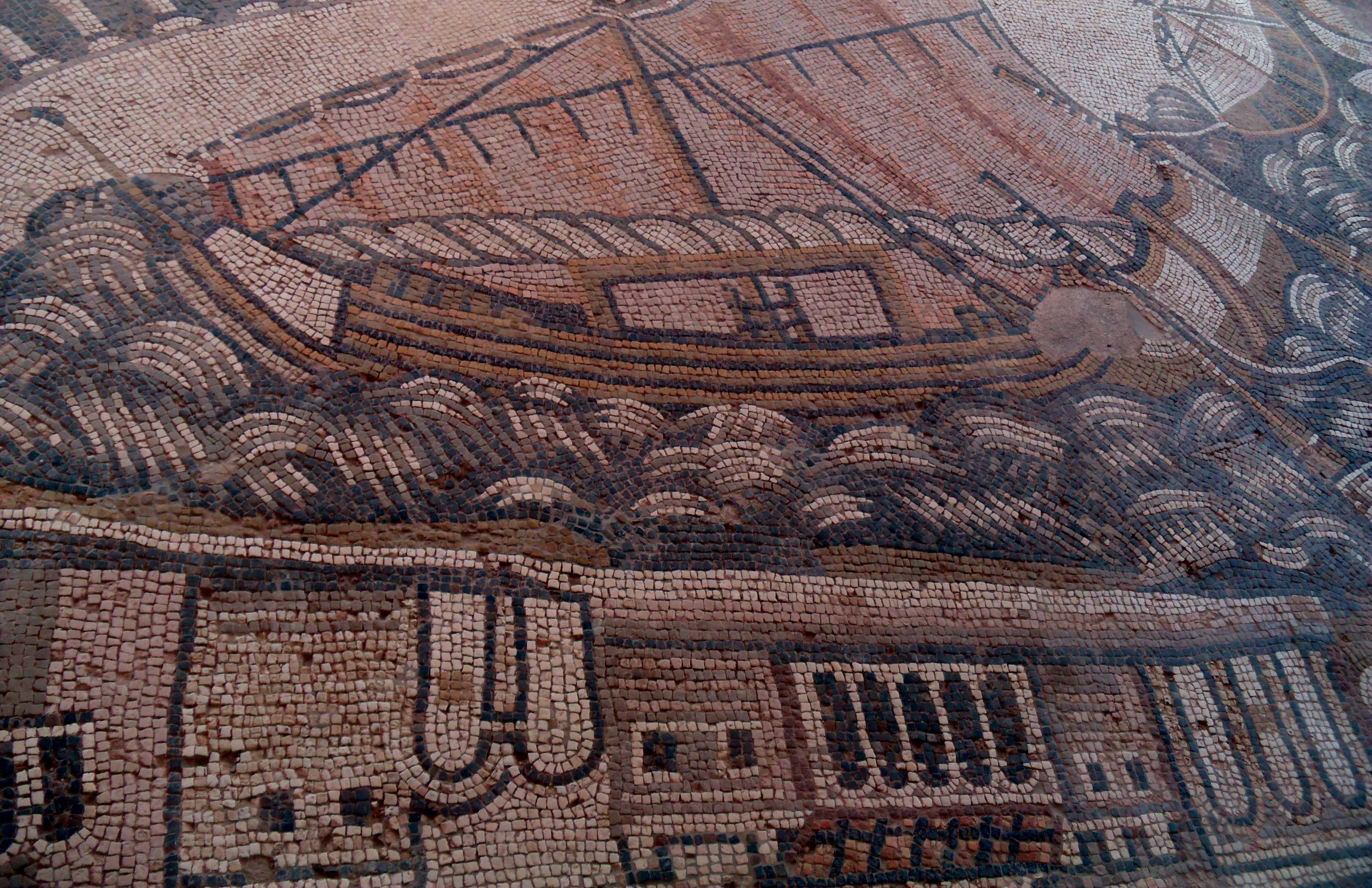
A detail from the Kelenderis mosaic

The Mosaic of Aydıncık (Turkish: Aydıncık Mozayiği, also called Mosaic of Kelenderis) is a 5th or 6th century AD floor mosaic in Mersin Province, Turkey.

== Geography ==
The mosaic is in the urban fabric of Aydıncık ilçe (district) of Mersin Province at 36°08′36″N 33°19′24″E. It is slightly to the west of the ancient harbor in a place locally known as Hanyıkığı. Its distance to Mersin is 160 kilometres (99 mi).

== The mosaic ==
The mosaic was unearthed by Professor Levent Zoroğlu of Selçuk University and his team in 1992.

The dimensions of the floor mosaic is 12 x 3.2 square meters (40 x 11 square feet). On the mosaic, the medieval harbor, two vessels and a part of the city were depicted. A part of the mosaic has been decorated with geometric figures. Professor Zoroğlu estimates that the mosaic had been created in the fifth and sixth centuries, i.e., early Byzantine era. There is no human being or a tree. Probably the image displayed on the mosaic was a kind of city guide for the visitors.

In 2005 the mosaic was put under a displaycase.
