= Teknecik =

- Neighbourhood
- Location in Turkey
- Coordinates: 36°16′N 33°19′E
- Country: Turkey
- Province: Mersin
- District: Aydıncık
- Elevation: 755 m (2,477 ft)
- Population (2022): 122
- Time zone: UTC+3 (TRT)
- Postal code: 33847
- Area code: 0324

Teknecik is a neighbourhood in the municipality and district of Aydıncık, Mersin Province, Turkey. Its population is 122 (2022). Distance to Aydıncık is 30 kilometres (19 mi) and to Mersin is 205 kilometres (127 mi). The village is situated in the Taurus Mountains.
