= Karaseki, Aydıncık =

Karaseki
- Neighbourhood
- Location in Turkey
- Coordinates: 36°11′N 33°18′E
- Country: Turkey
- Province: Mersin
- District: Aydıncık
- Elevation: 450 m (1,480 ft)
- Population (2022): 79
- Time zone: UTC+3 (TRT)
- Postal code: 33847
- Area code: 0324

Karaseki is a neighbourhood in the municipality and district of Aydıncık, Mersin Province, Turkey. Its population is 79 (2022). It is situated on the road connecting Aydıncık to Gülnar. The distance to Aydıncık is 10 kilometres (6.2 mi) and to Mersin is 185 kilometres (115 mi). The village is situated in the Taurus Mountains. Due to a shortage of irrigation water, dry farming is common in the village.
