= Sagres =

Sagres may refer to:

== Places ==
- Sagres (Vila do Bispo), a civil parish in the municipality of Vila do Bispo, Portugal
- Sagres Point, a promontory in the southwestern part of Vila do Bispo, Portugal
  - Lighthouse of Ponta de Sagres
- Sagres, São Paulo, a municipality in the state of São Paulo, Brazil

== Other ==
- Escola de Sagres, a nautical school that would have existed in the civil parish of Sagres, Portugal, during the fifteenth century
- NRP Sagres (1896), a tall ship in Portuguese naval service also known as Sagres II, and now Rickmer Rickmers
- NRP Sagres (1937), a tall ship in Portuguese naval service also known as Sagres III
- Sagres (beer), a Portuguese brewery, founded in 1934
- "Sagres" (song), the first single from the album Dark Bird Is Home by Swedish artist The Tallest Man on Earth

== See also ==
- Sgares (born 1988), American professional Counter-Strike: Global Offensive player
