= Aydıncık, Mersin =

Aydıncık
- District and municipality
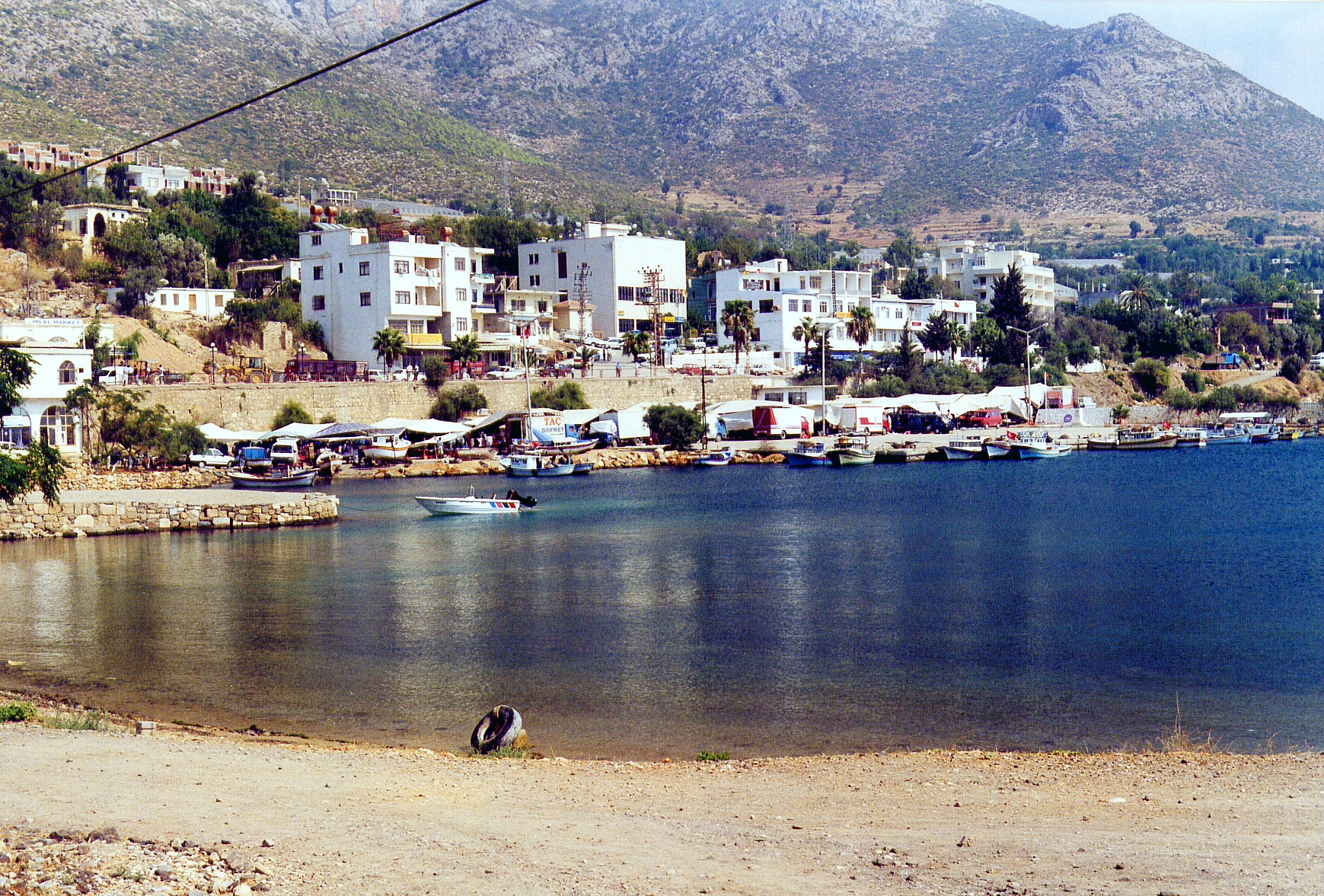

- Map showing Aydıncık District in Mersin Province

- Location within Turkey
- Coordinates: 36°08′30″N 33°19′04″E
- Country: Turkey
- Province: Mersin

Government
  - Mayor: Özkan Kılıçarpa (CHP)
- Area: 352 km^{2} (136 sq mi)
- Population (2022): 11,468
  - Density: 32.6/km^{2} (84.4/sq mi)
- Time zone: UTC+3 (TRT)
- Postal code: 33840
- Area code: 0324
- Website: www.mersinaydincik.bel.tr

Aydıncık is a municipality and district of Mersin Province, Turkey. Its area is 352 km^{2}, and its population is 11,468 (2022). It is on the Mediterranean coast, 173 km (107 mi) from Mersin and 325 km (202 mi) from Antalya.

Aydıncık has also been called in Armenian Կելենդերիդա, and Gilindire, from Kelenderis (Greek: Κελένδερις).

This remote coastline is mostly unspoilt and 38 kilometers long, including some sandy beach, and the town of Aydıncık is spread along the coast near a small point, Sancak Burnu.

== History ==
Aydıncık is the site of the ancient Greek Celenderis, a port and fortress in ancient Cilicia and later Isauria. It was one of the best harbours of this coast in ancient times and also a very strong defensive position. Artemidorus, with other geographers, considered this place, as the commencement of Cilicia. There must have been earlier settlement going back to the Hittites and Assyrians but so far no evidence has been uncovered.

According to legend the city was founded by Sandocus, a grandson of Phaethon, who emigrated here from Syria. He married Pharnace, the princess of Hyria. Their son Cinyras founded Paphos. Historians reported that the city was indeed a Phoenician settlement, later expanded by an Ionian colony from Samos. Excavations carried out since 1986 have revealed findings going back to the 8th century B.C. when the Samians arrived.

The city thrived during the 4th and 5th centuries BC. It was a stop on the shipping lanes between the Aegean Sea to the west, Cyprus to the south, and Syria to the east. In the 450s B.C. the fleets of Athens passed by on their way to support rebellions against the Achaemenid Empire in Cyprus and Egypt. During this period Celenderis became the easternmost city to pay tribute to the Athenian-led Delian League. Payments were only made from 460 B.C. to 454 B.C. before Athens abandoned both campaigns and accepted a peace agreement which left Celenderis in the Achaemenid-allied Kingdom of Cilicia.

During the Hellenistic era (1st century BC) Celenderis was in a political coalition with the kingdom of the Ptolemys of Egypt, and faced severe difficulties from piracy. This problem persisted until Ancient Rome took military actions against the pirates, and Celenderis enjoyed a second period of wealth as the Romans secured the Mediterranean trade routes. They built a city around the port with villas, palaces, waterworks, and baths. During the Middle Ages, the grandeur persisted as the city was controlled by Byzantium, and in the 11th century the Armenians.

In 1228, Celenderis castle was captured from the Armenians by the Karamanoğlu Beylik and the coast was settled by Turkish peoples. The town's name mutated to Gilindere and it continued to be an important port between Anatolia and Cyprus until the beginning of the twentieth century. It was renamed Aydıncık in 1965.

=== Celenderis Coins ===
The town gave name to a region called Celenderitis, and coined those silver tetradrachms, which supply some of the earliest and finest specimens of the numismatic art. There are also coins of the Syrian kings, and of the later Roman emperors.

== Places of interest ==
The remains of ancient Celenderis are very few and the ruins today are mostly overlaid by the expanding modern Aydıncık. Fortifications may still be detected around the modern lighthouse on the small promontory which forms and commands the harbor. There is a landlocked bay with its famous spring 1.6 km to the west at Soguksu. Here there are ancient ruins, notably a bath at the head of the bay and archaeological debris on the peninsula at its mouth. There are handsome but much destroyed rock-cut tombs at Duruhan 9.6 km to the North.

In 2002, remains of a 2400-year-old harbor was discovered underwater around the island Yılanlı Island.

=== The Port Bath ===
It was most probably built during fourth or fifth centuries AD. The castle on the point and the theater apparently belong to the Roman era.

=== Tombs ===
In the graveyards of the city, rock graves, vaulted graves and pyramid-roofed monumental graves can be seen spanning a period from the sixth millennium B.C. up to the fourth century. The majority of the items displayed at the museum are from these graves.

=== Floor Mosaic ===
The mosaic discovered near the port in 1992 is an exceptional example in depicting the panorama of the city as it stood in the fifth century.

=== The Dörtayak Cenotaph ===
There is a large Roman Cenotaph with four columns from the 2nd century. It was marked as a CENOTAPH (a monument erected as a memorial to a dead person or dead people buried elsewhere, especially people killed fighting a war) on the map of Chelindreh harbor prepared by Rear Admiral Sir Francis Beaufort. This is a tetrapylon made of well-cut limestones with a rectangular burial room on the lower part, four pylons erected on this and a pyramidal roof carried by the arches of the four pylons. This type is a common one in the Roma period and may be dated to the second half of the second or early third century AD.

=== Gilindire Cave ===
The cave of Gilindere is about an hour's ride along the coast by small boat, and is 555m of attractive stone and crystal formations.

== Composition ==
There are 15 neighbourhoods in Aydıncık District:

- Atatürk
- Cumhuriyet
- Duruhan
- Eskiyürük
- Hacıbahattin
- Hürriyet
- Karadere
- Karaseki
- Merkez
- Pembecik
- Teknecik
- Yeni
- Yenikaş
- Yeniyürük
- Yeniyürükkaş
