= Kubat Pasha Medrese =

Madrasa in Tarsus, Mersin, Turkey

Kubat Pasha Madrese
- Kubat Paşa Medresesi
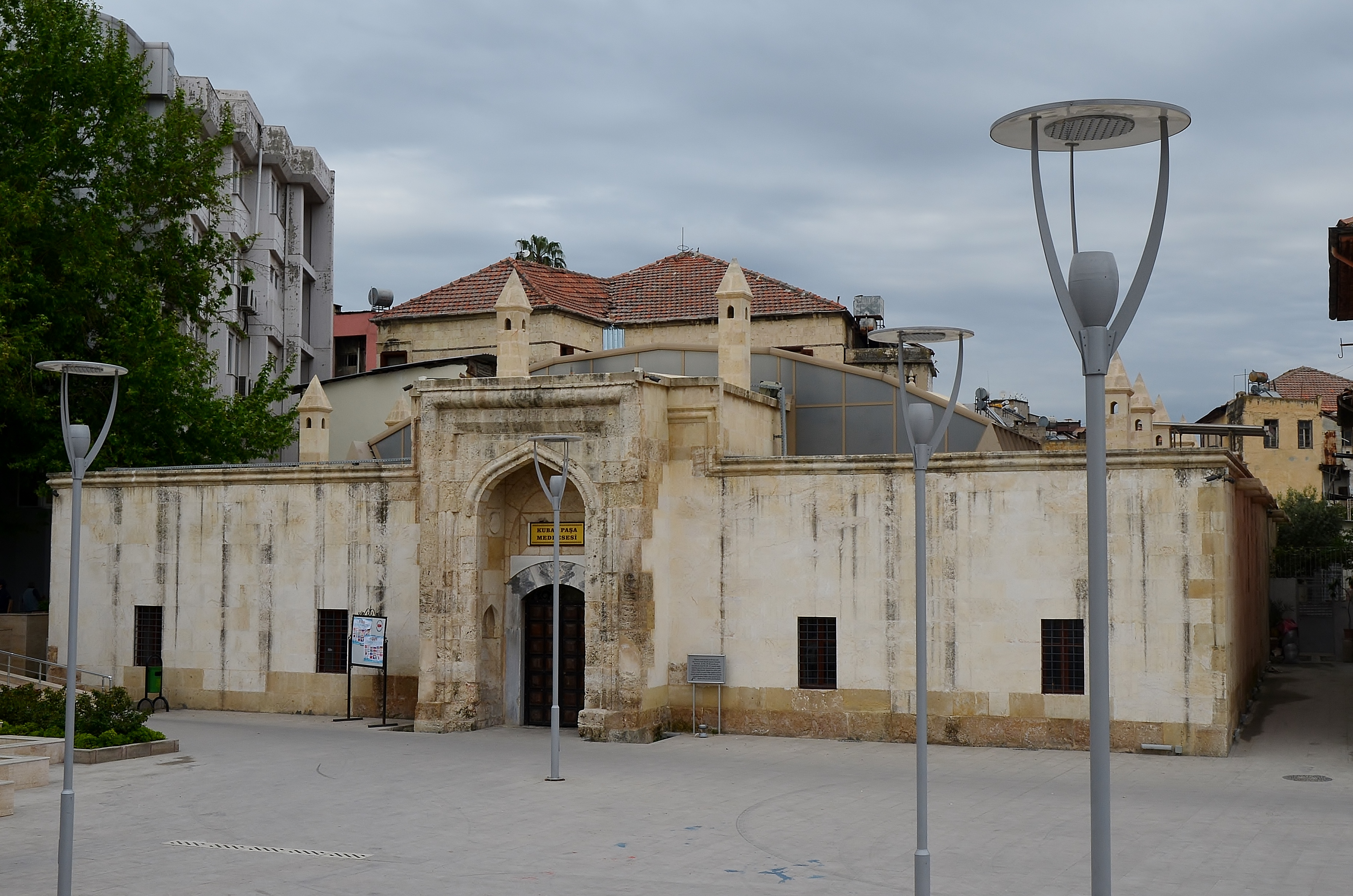

- Location of Kubat Pasha Madrese in Turkey.

Religion
- District: Tarsus
- Province: Mersin Province
- Patron: Kubat Pasha
- Status: Preserved

Location
- Country: Turkey
- Coordinates: 36.91684°N 34.89748°E

Architecture
- Style: Seljuk, Ottoman
- Completed: 1557

Specifications
- Direction of façade: Southwest
- Materials: Ashlar

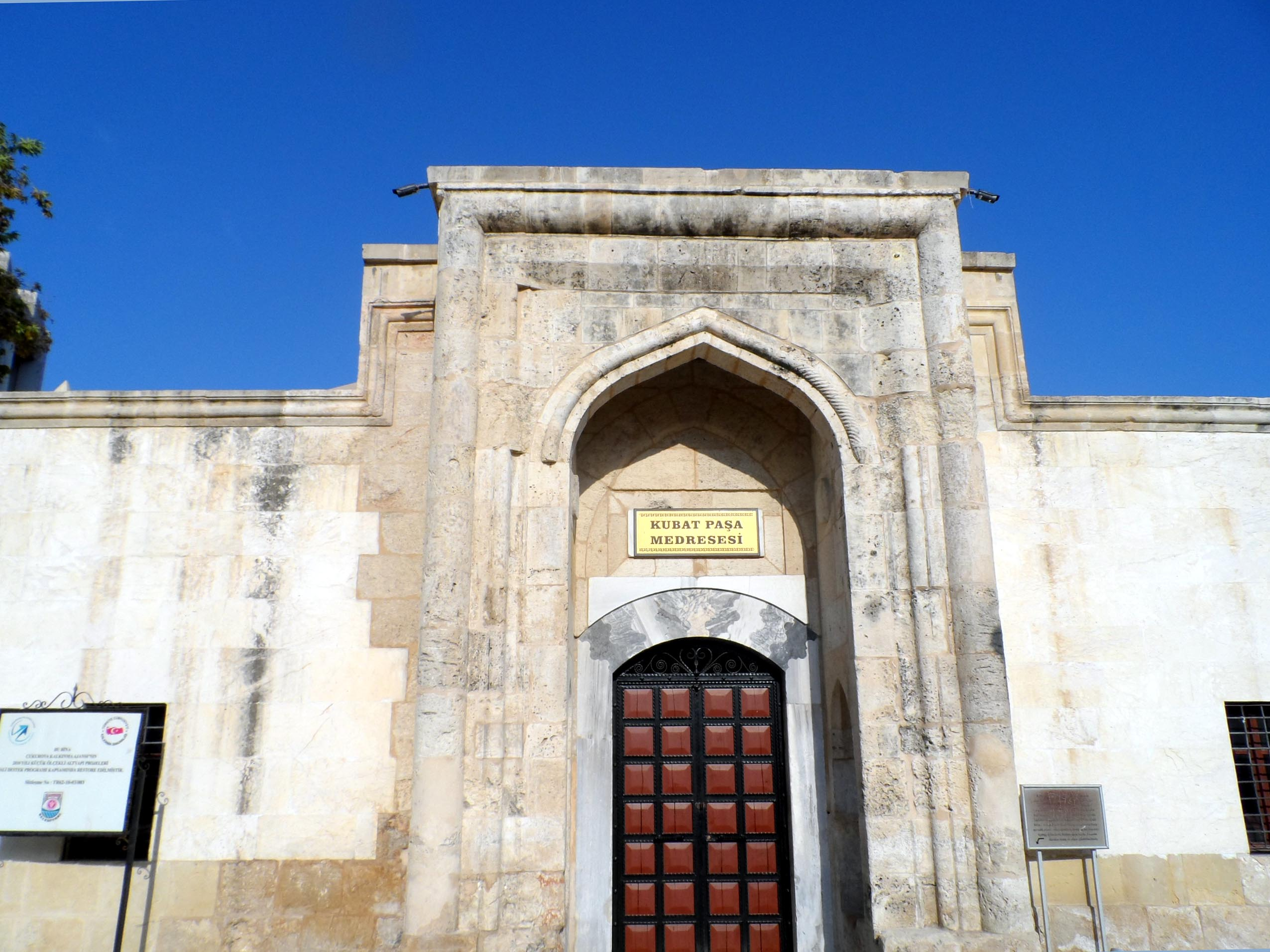
Main gate of the Madrasa.

Kubat Pasha Medrese (Turkish: Kubat Paşa Medresesi) is a historic madrasa building in Tarsus district of Mersin Province, southern Turkey.

== Location ==
The madrasa is located in the old city center south of the main street, where some other historical buildings, including the Grand Mosque of Tarsus, Mausoleum of Danyal and Saint Paul's Church, are also situated. The madrasa building faces the Mausoleum of Danyal to the west.

== History ==
Madrasa was the main religious educational institution in Islamic countries. The Kubat Pasha Medrese was founded in 1557 by Kubat Pasha, brother of Piri Pasha, a member of the Ramazanid house and a vassal bey of the Ottoman Empire. In 1517, Ramazanids accepted the suzerainty of the Ottomans.

The madrasa underwent many restorations in the past. During the restoration in 1969-1970, it was redesigned to be used as a museum, and it lost some of its original characteristics by this works. In 1999, the Tarsus Museum was relocated to its present building at the 75th Anniversary Cultural Center. During the restoration works at the Mausoleum of Daniel Mosque, the madrasa building was briefly used as a mosque.

== The building ==
Designed in Seljuk architecture and built in ashlar masonry, the madrasa has a rectangular plan. Originally, the building had two stories with a single iwan around a courtyard. During the restoration works in 1970, the building lost its original form in great extend. It is a small quadrangle with 16 rooms around. The vaulted rooms are fitted each with a fireplace. Entrance to the madrasa is through a decorated portal in the Seljuk architectural style faces southwest.

In 2012, the Municipality of Tarsus undertook another restoration at the madrasa. During the works, an inscription in Ancient Greek language, which is assumed to be from the Roman period, was unearthed at the base of the entrance gate.
