= Sharif al-Ulama =

Grand Ayatollah Sharif al-Ulama
- شریف العلماء

Personal life
- Born: 1205 AH Karbala in Iraq
- Died: 1246 AH
- Cause of death: Plague
- Resting place: Karbala
- Parent: Sheikh Mulla Hassan Ali Amoli Mazandarani (father)

Religious life
- Religion: Islam
- Denomination: Shi'a
- School: Twelver
- Initiation: by one of the founders of the science of principles

Senior posting
- Teacher: Sadr al-Din bin Saleh; Mirza-ye Qomi; Seyyed Ali Tabatabai; Seyyed Mohammad Mujahed
- Period in office: Qajar dynasty
- Students: Murtadha al-Ansari Sheikh Jafar Shooshtari Mulla Ismail Yazdi Saeid al-Ulama Fazel Darbandi Muhammad Ridha Al Yasin Ebrahim Mousavi Qazvini Mohammad Hossein Fazel Ardakani

Muhammad Sharif bin Hassan Ali Amoli Mazandarani Haeri also known as Sharif al-Ulama, was a Shi'a religious authority. He died in the widespread plague of 1246 AH in Karbala and was buried in his house. He was the master of Murtadha al-Ansari and Sheikh Jafar Shooshtari.

== See also ==
- Murtadha al-Ansari – Iranian Shia Islamic scholar (1799–1864)
- Sheikh Jafar Shooshtari – Shia scholar (1810s–1885)
