= Mausoleum of Danyal =

Tombs in Tarsus, Turkey

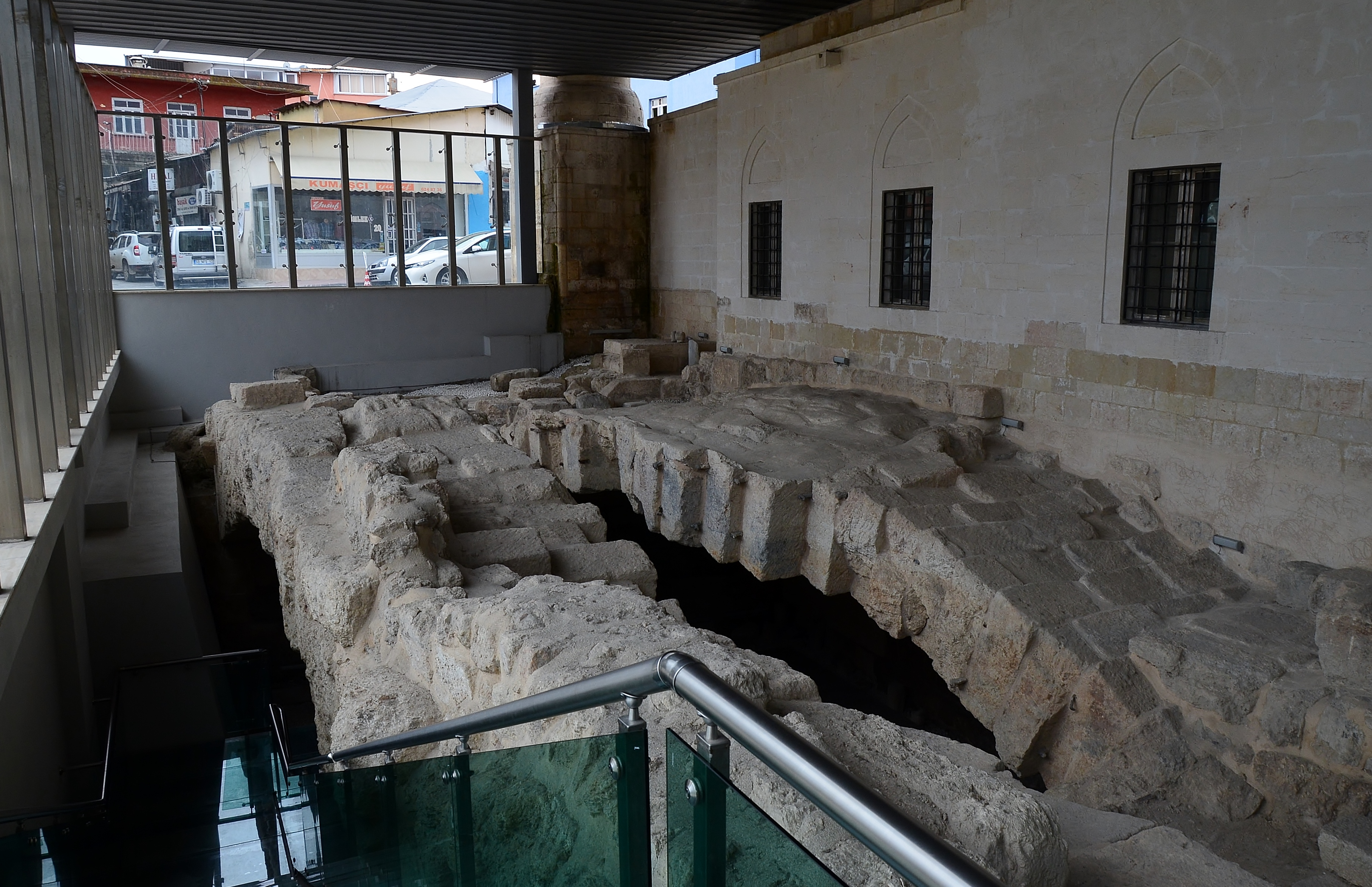
Ruins in the basement of Daniel's Tomb Mosque

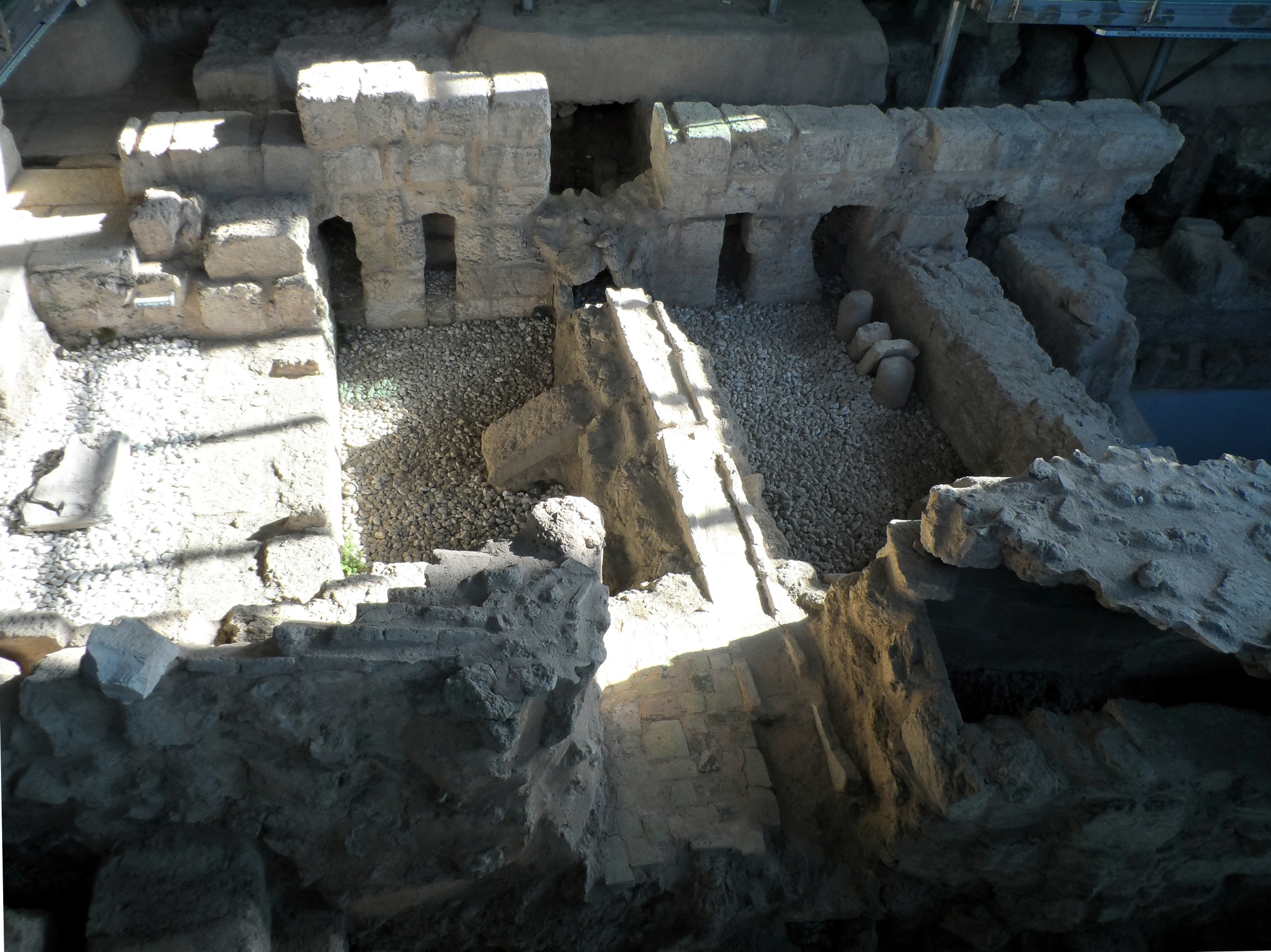
The ruins in the basement seen from the platform in the mosque

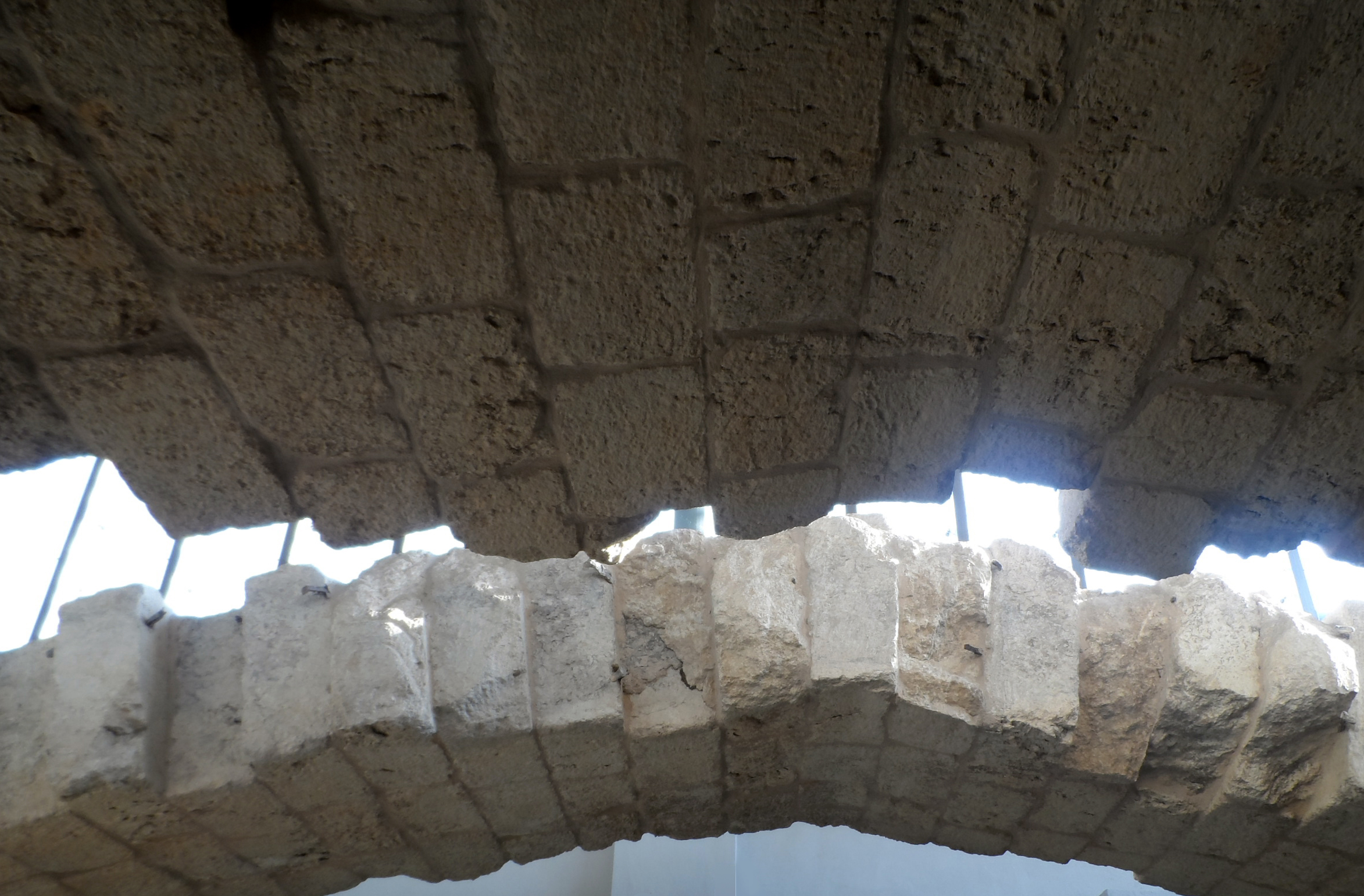
One of the arches. The width of the crack is about 1.50 m (4.9 ft).

The Mousoleum of Danyal (Turkish: Danyal Makamı) is a small complex in Tarsus, Turkey, consisting of a mosque and a tomb, which is believed to be that of the biblical figure Daniel. Two arches of a Roman bridge were found in the basement of the mosque-tomb complex during a renovation project.

== Geography ==
Tarsus is an old city and is known as the birthplace of Paul the Apostle. The Mausoleum of Danyal, the mosque and the arches of the Roman bridge, are located in a neighborhood of the city which is full of historical buildings such as the Grand Mosque of Tarsus, the Tarsus Old Mosque and Saint Paul's Church. It is at 36°55′02″N 34°53′51″E. The mosque is to the north and the tomb as well as the arches of the bridge are situated to the south of the complex. Its distance to Mersin is 28 km (17 mi).

== Legend of Daniel ==
Although Danyal in Islam is not included in the list of the 25 Islamic Prophets, he is considered to be a holy figure. According to legend, during a famine period Danyal was invited to Tarsus and brought prosperity to the city. When he died he was buried in Tarsus. In 1857, a small mosque was built next to the place where his body was thought to lie, even before his tomb was unearthed. Subsequently, the mosque was named after him.

According to a source which refers to an 11th-century Arabic language source, Tarsus was captured by the Rashidun caliph Umar. A subordinate of Umar found a large coffin and a ring on the finger of the deceased. There was a figure of two lions and a boy on the ring and Umar predicted that the deceased was Danyal. In order to protect the coffin, Umar buried the coffin under the river.

== History of the bridge ==
The arches are part of a large Roman bridge constructed in the 1st century AD. Before the 6th century, the course of the Berdan River lay within the city, and the city suffered from the irregular flow rate and the seasonal floods. The Byzantine Emperor Justinianus I (reigned 527–565) had an alternative course to the east of the city constructed to reduce the risk of floods. The Roman bridge had spanned the river's former course and had lost its function after the river was diverted. When the city was captured by the Arabs (ca. 7th–9th centuries) they found the useless bridge, and it seems they used a part of the bridge as a tomb. However, because of the floods in the following centuries, the ground level of Tarsus was slowly rising and the former bridge was buried under the ground.

The long-forgotten bridge might have been unearthed in 1946 during a city sewage project when a part of the arch was found. But unconscious of its historical value, the constructor partially damaged it while laying water pipes. It was only recently that the two arches were rediscovered. In 2002, during the renewal of Danyal's Mosque to add a abdestlik ("wudu place"), the constructor unearthed a part of a big arch several meters underground. After a rescue excavation by the Ministry of Culture and Tourism in 2006, the arch of a drop-vault bridge and an accompanying small building, which houses an Islamic tomb, were unearthed. Although there was no inscription on the tomb, it was popularly taken to be the tomb of Danyal in accordance with the popular belief.

== Archaeology ==
Judging from the size of the arch, there must be more arches of the former bridge. The other arches are still buried under the urban fabric, including other valuable historical buildings, and presently they have not been excavated. The size of the main underground compartment of the two arches is 13.80 m × 6.50 m (45.3 ft × 21.3 ft) and the dimension of the adjacent compartment of the tomb to the northeast is 3.60 m × 2.80 m (11.8 ft × 9.2 ft). The depth of the foundation of the arch is 5.40 m (17.7 ft) and the depth of the highest point is 1.50 m (4.9 ft) with respect to ground level. For structural performance, the voussoirs were jointed with lead-coated iron fittings. On the wall adjacent to the tomb, a hectogram had been carved. There are some small finds, which are thought to belong to a yet unearthed bath, and four coins of the Rashidun Caliphate.

== See also ==
- Daniel in Islam
- Tomb of Daniel, in Susa, Iran.
