= Daniel in Islam =

Prophet of Islam

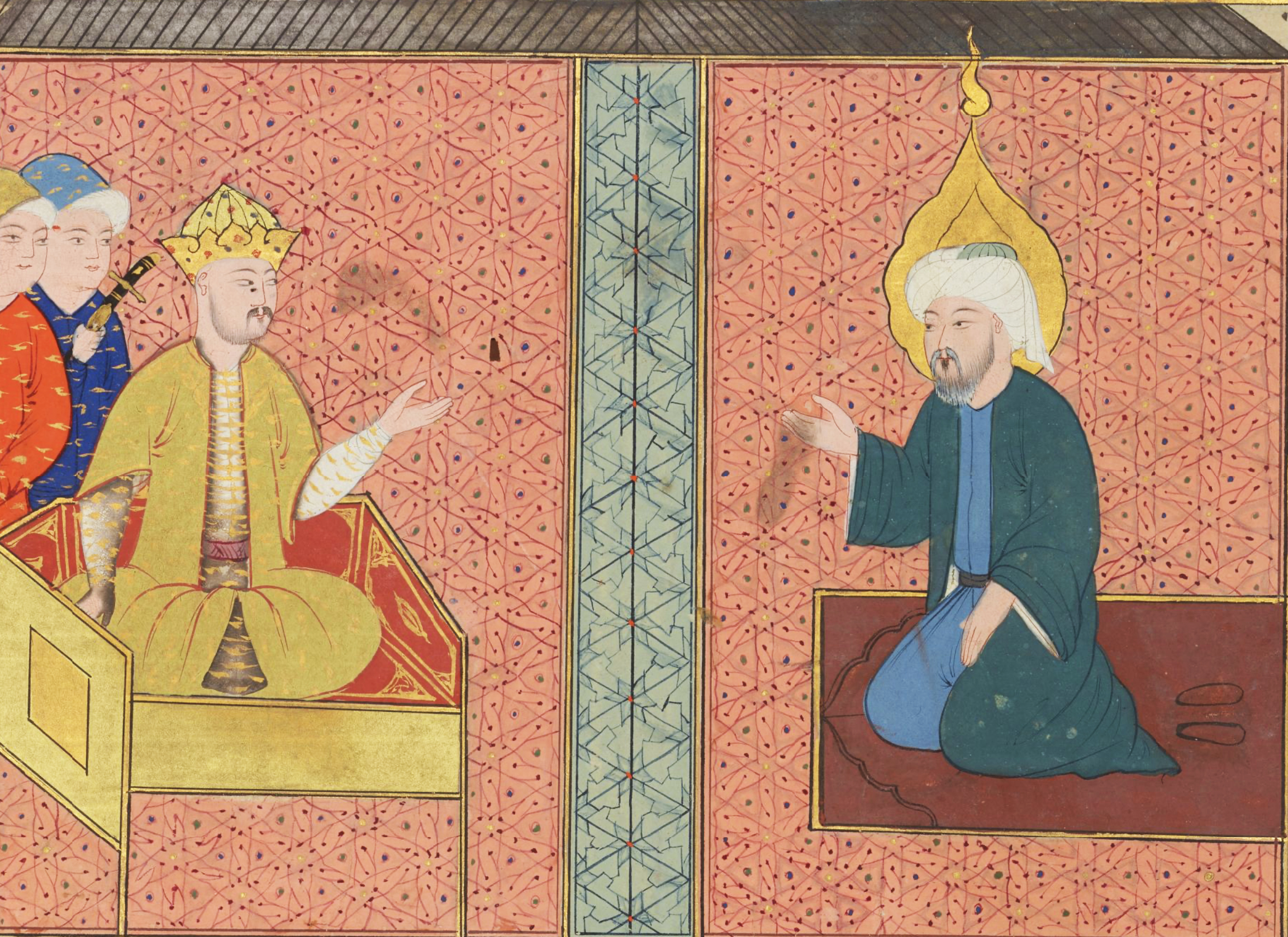
Illustration of a 1585-1590 Ottoman manuscript depicting Danyal (right) speaking to king Nebuchadnezzar II as a dream interpreter.

Daniel (Arabic: دانيال, Dānyāl) is usually considered by Muslims in general to have been a prophet and according to Shia Muslim hadith he was a prophet. Although he is not mentioned in the Qur'an, nor in hadith of Sunni Islam, Sunni Muslim reports of him are taken from Isra'iliyyat, which bear his name and which refer to his time spent in the den of the lions. There are debates, however, that go on about Daniel's time of preaching and while in reports of Shia Islam from the Shia Imams he is considered as a prophet, some Muslims from other branches of Islam believe that he was not a prophet but a saintly man. Some Muslim records suggest that a book regarding apocalyptic revelations was found in a coffin, which is supposed to have contained the remains of Daniel, which was brought to light at the time of the Muslim conquest of Tustar, and buried again at the request of Umar.

== Background ==
Muslim tradition has retained some records of the two figures named Daniel in the Hebrew Bible: the first being the sage of ancient times mentioned by Ezekiel and the second being the visionary who lived at the time of the captivity in Babylon, whose life was chronicled in the Book of Daniel, canonized in the current Hebrew Bible. The first figure is referred to as "Daniel the Elder" in Muslim writing, whilst the second figure is referred to as Daniel. Daniel's character in Muslim legend has shaped the figure in a similar way to that of the prophet Idris, as he is considered to have been a revealer of future mysteries, coupled with one who excelled in scientific matters. However, other scholars reject the differentiating and treat both Daniel the Elder and Daniel as one and the same. Also Ibn Tayymiyyah in his book al-Jawaab as-Saheeh writes a lot about Daniel writing and foretelling Muhammad

== Daniel in Muslim literature ==
Muslim tradition recounts that it was Daniel who preached in Babylon, exhorting the people to return to God. He lived during the reign of Cyrus, and taught this prince the unity of God and the true religion of Islam. Key events from Daniel's life which are recounted in exegesis are the presence of Daniel and his companions in the court of Nebuchadnezzar; Nebuchadnezzar's dreams; the friction between Daniel and his detractors and his miraculous delivery from the den of the lions; and Belshazzar's feast and the deciphering of the mysterious writing. Other events from the Book of Daniel, such as Susanna and the Elders, play no part in tradition.

One legend that is not found in Jewish tradition but appears in Muslim writings is that of Jeremiah meeting Daniel. A similar event involving Habakkuk and Daniel, however, is to be found in Lives of the Prophets. Ibn Abi Al-Dunya narrated the following, based on a chain of citations:

Nebuchadnezzar captured two lions and threw them into a pit. He then brought Danyal and threw him at them; yet they did not pounce at him; rather, he remained as God wished. When then he desired food and drink, God revealed to Jeremiah, who was in Sham: "Prepare food and drink for Danyal." He said: "O Lord I am in Jerusalem while Danyal is in Babylon." God revealed to him: "Do what I have commanded you to do, and I shall send you one who will carry you and what you have prepared." Jeremiah did so and God sent him something that would carry him until he arrived at the brink of the pit. Then Danyal asked: "Who is this?" He answered: "I am Jeremiah." He asked: "What brought you?" He answered: "Your Lord sent me to you." He said: "And so my Lord has remembered me?" He said: "Yes." Danyal said: "Praise be to God Who has never forgotten me! And Praise be to God Who never forgets those who appeal to Him! And Praise be to Him Who compensates good with good, rewards patience with safety, dispels harm after distress, assures us when we are overwhelmed, and is our hope when skill fails us."

Danyal also appears in The Thousand and One Nights. On Night 394, in the tale of ‘The Pious Jewish Woman’ he appears as a 12-year-old boy who mediates in the case of a woman falsely accused of adultery. The book refers to him as a prophet.

=== In Shia Islam ===
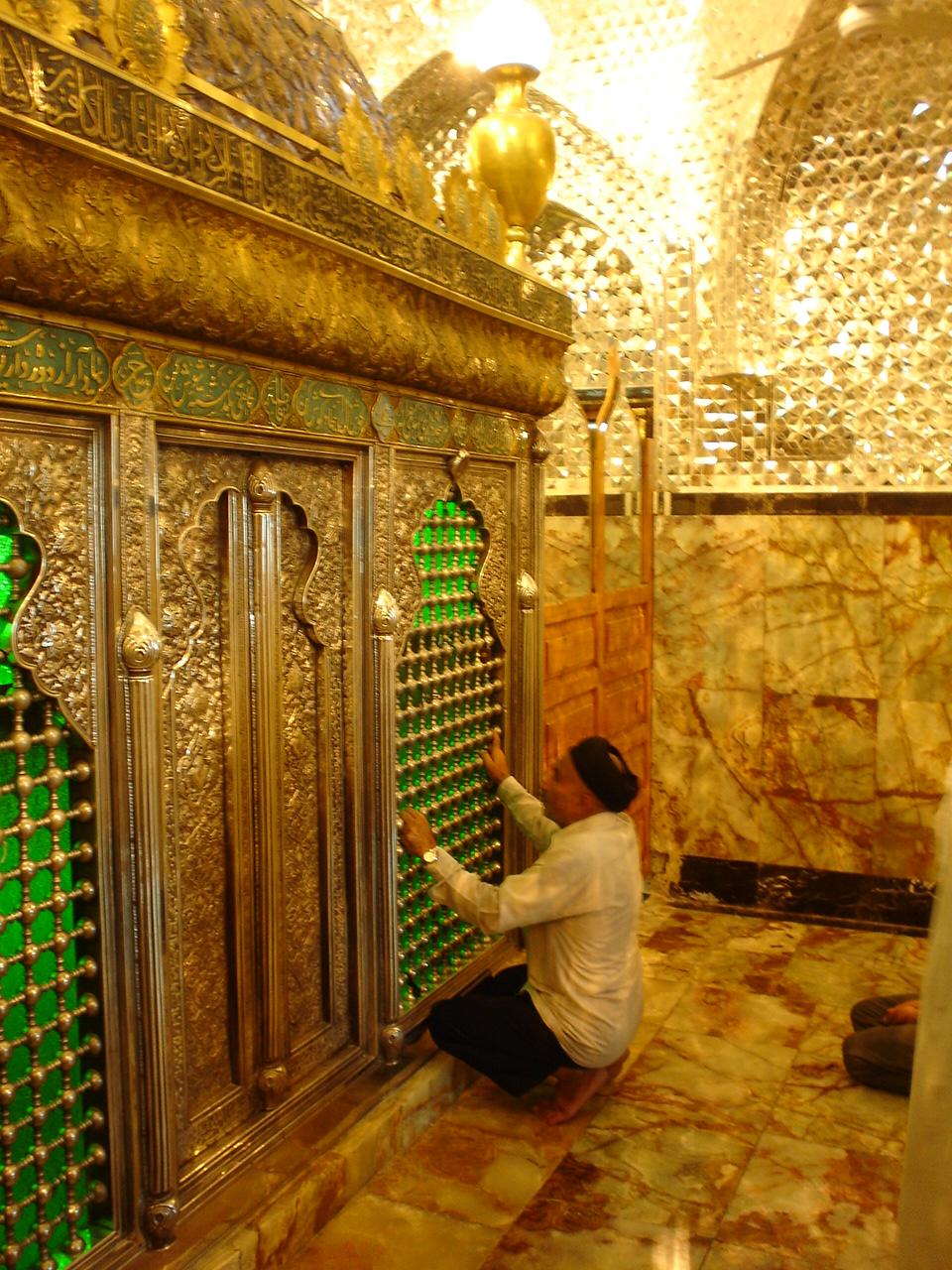
Tomb of Daniel in Susa, Iran

Once one of the close companions of the 6th Shia Imam Ja'far al-Sadiq known as Jabir al-Ju'fi reported:

I asked the Imam regarding the interpretation of dreams of Danyal? The Imam said: Yes, he was inspired. He was a Prophet and one to whom God had taught the interpretation of dreams. He was truthful, wise...

A shrine known as Tomb of Daniel in Susa, Iran, is considered by Shia Muslims to be his sacred resting place and is visited by pilgrims.

== See also ==
- Mausoleum of Danyal, Tarsus, Turkey
- Tomb of Daniel, Susa, Iran
- Walter Benjamin

== Bibliography ==
- Emil G. Hirsch and M. Seligsohn (1906), Daniel, Jewish Encyclopedia; citing:
  - Tabari, Chronigue (French transl. by Zotenberg), i. 44, 496, 503, 571, ii. 283;
  - Mas'udi, Les Prairies d'Or (ed. B. de Meynard), ii. 128;
  - Barthélemy d'Herbelot, Bibliothèque Orientale, s.v.
- 'Balkhi, al-Badwa wa'l-Tarikh, ii, 156 f./144; 165/150 sq.; iii, 114 f./ 118 f. and c.f. index
- Thalabi, 'Ara'is al-Madjalis, 198 - 202
