= Tarsus Museum =

Museum in southern Turkey

Tarsus Museum (Tarsus Müzesi)
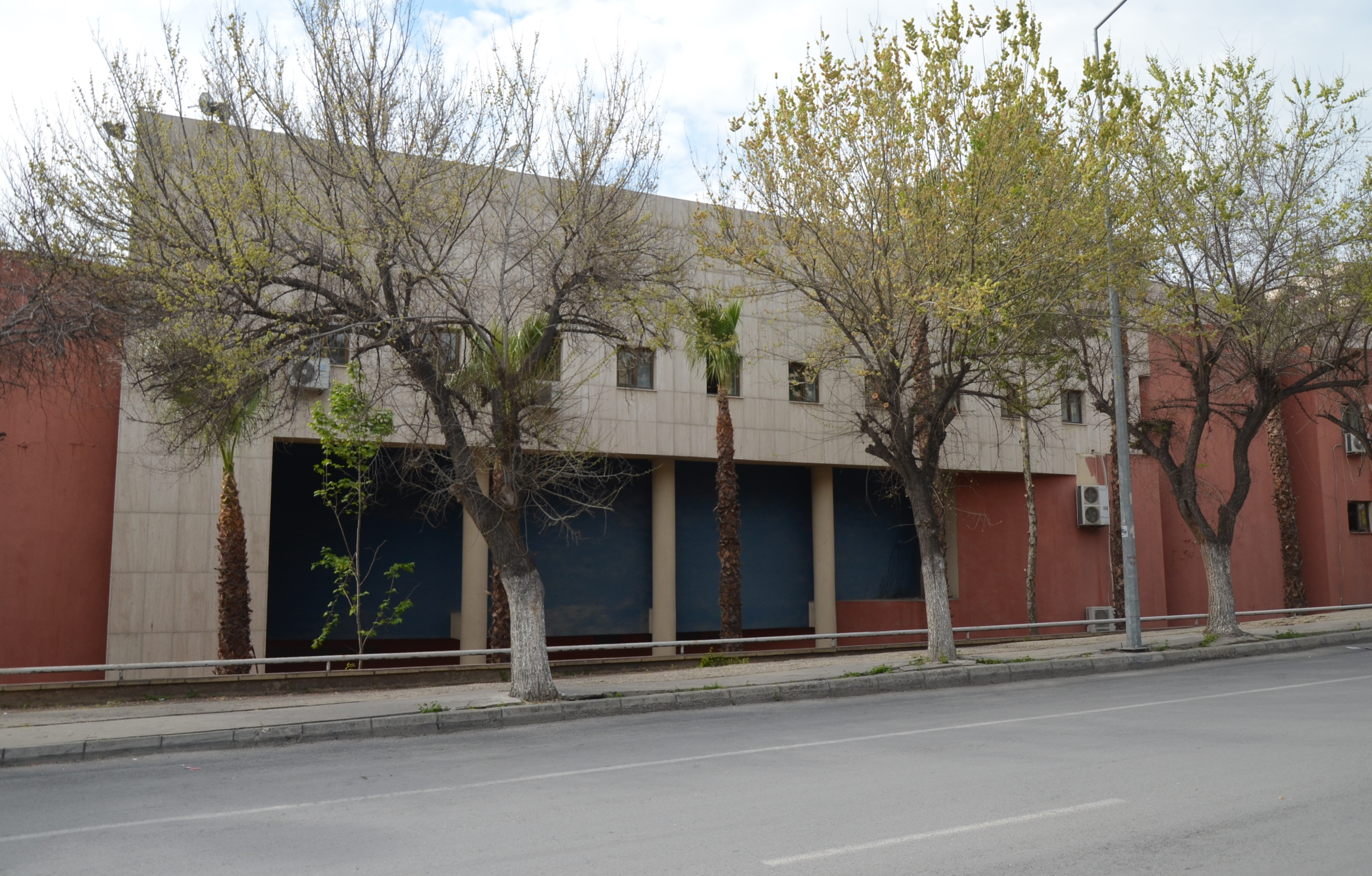
- 75th Anniversary Cultural Center housing the Tarsus Museum.

- Location of Tarsus Museum in Turkey.
- Established: 1971; 55 years ago
- Location: Muvaffak Uygur Cad. 75. Yıl Kültür Merkezi; Tarsus, Mersin, Turkey
- Coordinates: 36°54′52″N 34°53′18″E
- Type: Archaeology, ethnography

Tarsus Museum is an archaeology and ethnography museum in Tarsus, Mersin Province, in southern Turkey.

The present location of the museum is in the city's cultural complex known as "75th Anniversary Culture Complex". The complex is in a neighborhood, which is rich in historical buildings like the Tarsus Grand Mosque and St. Paul's Church.

== History of Tarsus ==
Tarsus is a historic city, which was an important settlement and cultural center within Çukurova without discontinuity throughout the ages. Gözlükule to the south of the city is a tumulus, which was inhabited during the Neolithic age. During the Roman Empire, Saint Paul lived in Tarsus. Later, the Byzantine Empire, the Umayyad and the Abbasid Caliphates and the Armenian Kingdom of Cilicia controlled the city. During the Turkish era, Tarsus was one of the principal cities of the Ramazanoğlu dynasty and later of the Ottoman Empire.

== Museum ==
The forming of the museum began in the years 1969-70 with the collection of artifacts. In 1971, the museum was established in a 1966-restored building, which was formerly a medrese commissioned by Kubat Pasha, a 16th-century member of the Ramazanid house. In 1999, the museum was moved to its present building.

The museum has over 35,000 objects in its archive including architectural pieces, which were found in and around Tarsus, and artifacts, which were purchased, confiscated or discovered during archaeological excavations.

The museum's collection consists of 5,198 archaeological and 1,596 ethnographical objects, 28,176 coins, 376 seals and 6 hand-written books. In addition, there are ten archaeological sites, five natural protected areas, nine historic military buildings, two military memorial cemeteries and 206 religious, cultural or civil constructions including the most notable St. Paul's Church and its well, which fell under the responsibility of the museum's administration.

The museum is housed in a two-story building with a mezzanine and a basement, and consists in two big halls, in which archaeological and ethnographical objects are exhibited.

=== Ethnography Hall ===
Ethnographic objects belonging to Tarsus and its environment, which are a major part of the culture in Çukurova, are displayed in this hall. The impact of the lifestyle, as the social, religious and the way of thinking of the people lived in the region, on the metal working and weaving is shown here. The handicraft items are designed with great diligence on silver, copper and wood. The cultural object include silver horse tack, saddlebags, amulets, decorative rugs, woman garments, silver headgear, money bags, kitchenware and other objects of the Yörüks and Turkmens. The weapons such as flintlocks, handguns, swords, daggers, powder flasks, field glasses, ceremonial shields are from the Ottoman era. Other objects of the social life on display are also silver tobacco pipes, silver watches, rings, onyx rosaries, hand-written religious books and Quran and water pipes.

Tarsus Home Corner

A typical Ottoman-era household of the region is depicted in the Tarsus Home corner.

=== Archaeology Hall ===
In the Archaeology Hall, artifacts which were purchased or unearthed during the archaeological excavations in the region are exhibited in chronological order. The objects span a period of 7,000 years including the Neolithic, Chalcolithic, Bronze Age and Iron Age as well as the civilizations of Archaic Greece, Classical antiquity, Hellenistic period, Ancient Rome, and Byzantine Empire.

Excavations section

From Gözlükule site are Bronze Age artifacts, terracotta objects and kitchenware and bronze tools. Tarsus Cumhuriyet Square finds include bronze furniture leg, terracotta oil lamps, actor figures, amphoras, mosaics of Tethys, bone tools, loom weights. Artifacts such as terracotta oil lamps, marble architectural elements, glass bracelets, heads of terracotta figures were discovered at the Roman temple of Donuktaş. Other objects are marble capitals and oil lamps found in the well of St Paul's church as well as a jug, teardrop bottles, hydria and 1st-century AD artifacts excavated from the Roman mausoleum.

Chronological artifacts section

Artifacts obtained through purchasing are on display in chronological order. These are utensils, cylindrical stone seals, loom weights and containers representative of Chalcolithic, Bronze Age and Iron Age originating from Adana and eastern Anatolia. There are containers in various forms, amphoras, lekythoi, and oil lamps from the Hellenistic period. Other exhibits are golden sheets, diadems, earring with Eros figure, golden rings and earrings, bronze barrettes, glass jugs, dishes, teardrop bottles, terracotta figures and bronze mini statues, bronze amphoras and handles, scales and daggers of the Roman Empire. Artifacts from the Byzantine Era complete the section.

Stone artifacts like marble busts and statues date back to the era between 330 BC and 396 AD found in Tarsus and around. Steles and terracotta graves document the timespan from the 6th century BC up to the 5th century AD in this region.

Coinage section

The rich coinage collection consists of finds beginning from the 5th century BC with Persian Empire and includes coins from the Classical antiquity, Hellenistic period, Roman Empire, Byzantine Empire and Islamic era.

St. Paul Museum

== Location and access ==
The museum is situated at Muaffak Uygur Cad. 75 Yıl Kültür Merkezi in Tarsus. It is open every day from 8:30 until 17:30 local time but Mondays.
