= Tomb of Daniel =

Burial place of the biblical figure Daniel in Iran

- آرامگاه دانیال نبی
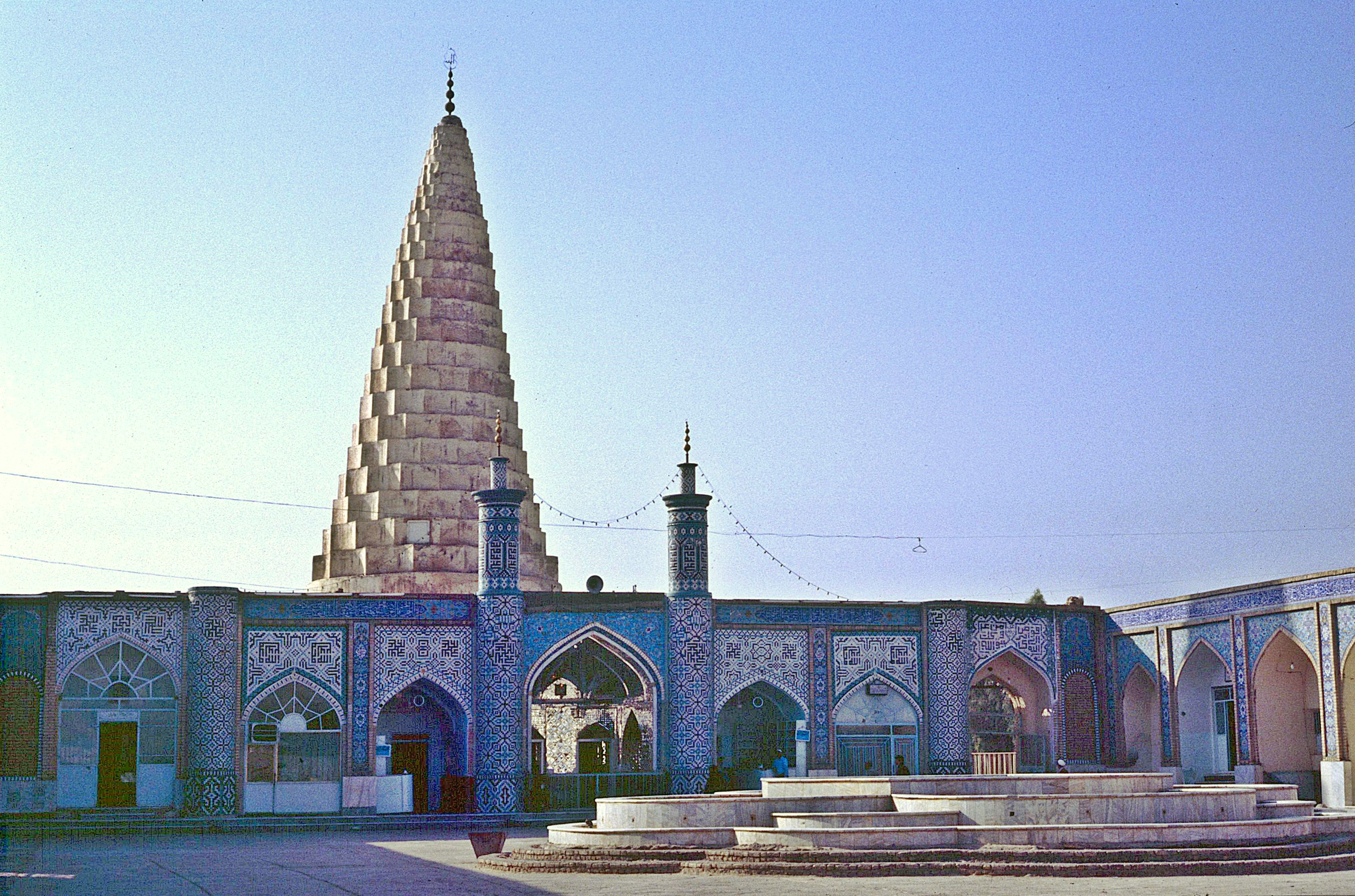
- The Tomb of Daniel

- Location of the tomb in Iran

Religion
- Affiliation: Christianity; Islam; Judaism
- Ecclesiastical or organisational status: Mausoleum
- Status: Active

Location
- Location: Susa, Khuzestan province
- Country: Iran
- Interactive map of Tomb of Daniel
- Coordinates: 32°11′25″N 48°14′37″E

Architecture
- Shrine: One: (Daniel)
- Iran National Heritage List
- Official name: Susa and Tomb of Daniel
- Type: Ruins/Mausoleum
- Designated: 1931
- Reference no.: 51
- Conservation organization: Cultural Heritage, Handicrafts and Tourism Organization of Iran

The Tomb of Daniel (Persian: آرامگاه دانیال نبی) is the traditional burial place of the biblical figure Daniel. Various locations have been named for the site, however the tomb in Susa, in the province of Khuzestan, Iran, is the most widely accepted site, it being first mentioned by Benjamin of Tudela, who visited Western Asia between 1160 and 1163 CE.

== Susa‌, Iran ==
The Book of Daniel mentions that Daniel lived in Babylon and may have visited the palace of Susa, Iran, but the place where he died is not specified; the tradition preserved among the Jews and Muslims is that he was buried in Susa. Today the Tomb of Daniel in Susa is a popular attraction among local Muslims and Iran's Jewish community alike.

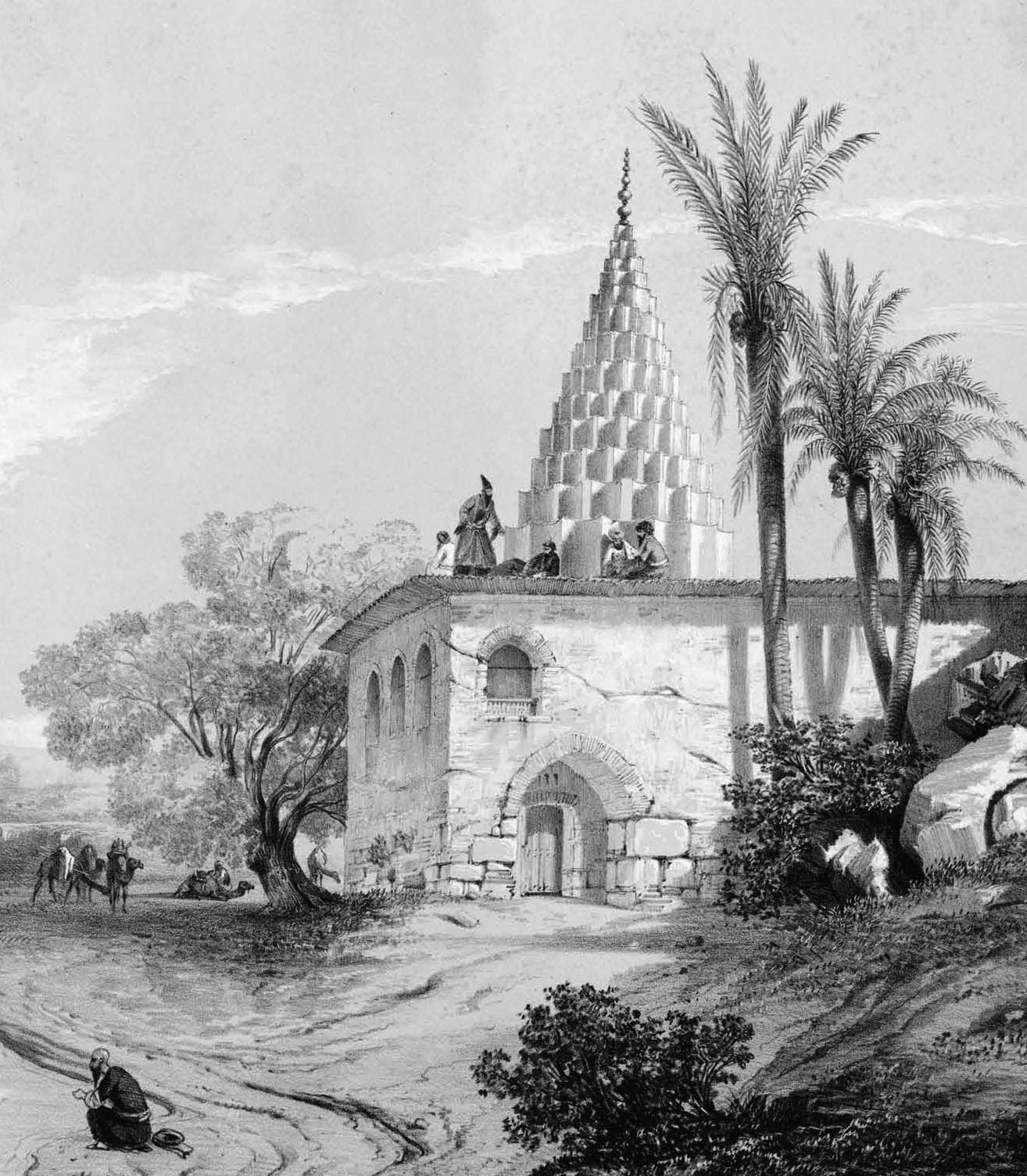
19th-century engraving of Daniel's tomb in Susa, from Voyage en Perse Moderne, by Flandin and Coste

The earliest mention of Daniel's Tomb published in Europe is given by Benjamin of Tudela who visited Asia between 1160 and 1163 CE. In the façade of one of its many synagogues, Benjamin was shown the tomb assigned by tradition to Daniel. Benjamin declared however, that the tomb does not hold Daniel's remains, which were said to have been discovered at Susa about 640 CE. The remains were supposed to bring good fortune and bitter quarrels arose because of them between the inhabitants of the two banks of the Choaspes River. Those who lived on the side on which Daniel's grave was situated were rich and happy, while those on the opposite side were poor and in want; the latter, therefore, wished the bier of Daniel to be moved to their side of the river. They finally agreed that the bier should rest alternately one year on each side. The agreement was carried out for many years, until the Seljuk shah Sanjar, on visiting the city, stopped the practice, holding that the continual removal of the bier was disrespectful to the prophet. He ordered the bier to be fastened with chains to the bridge, directly in the middle of the structure; and he erected a chapel on the spot for both Muslims and Jews. The king also forbade fishing in the river within a mile of Daniel's bier. Benjamin mentioned that the place was a dangerous one for navigation, since godless persons perish immediately on passing it; and the water under the bier is distinguished by the presence of goldfish.

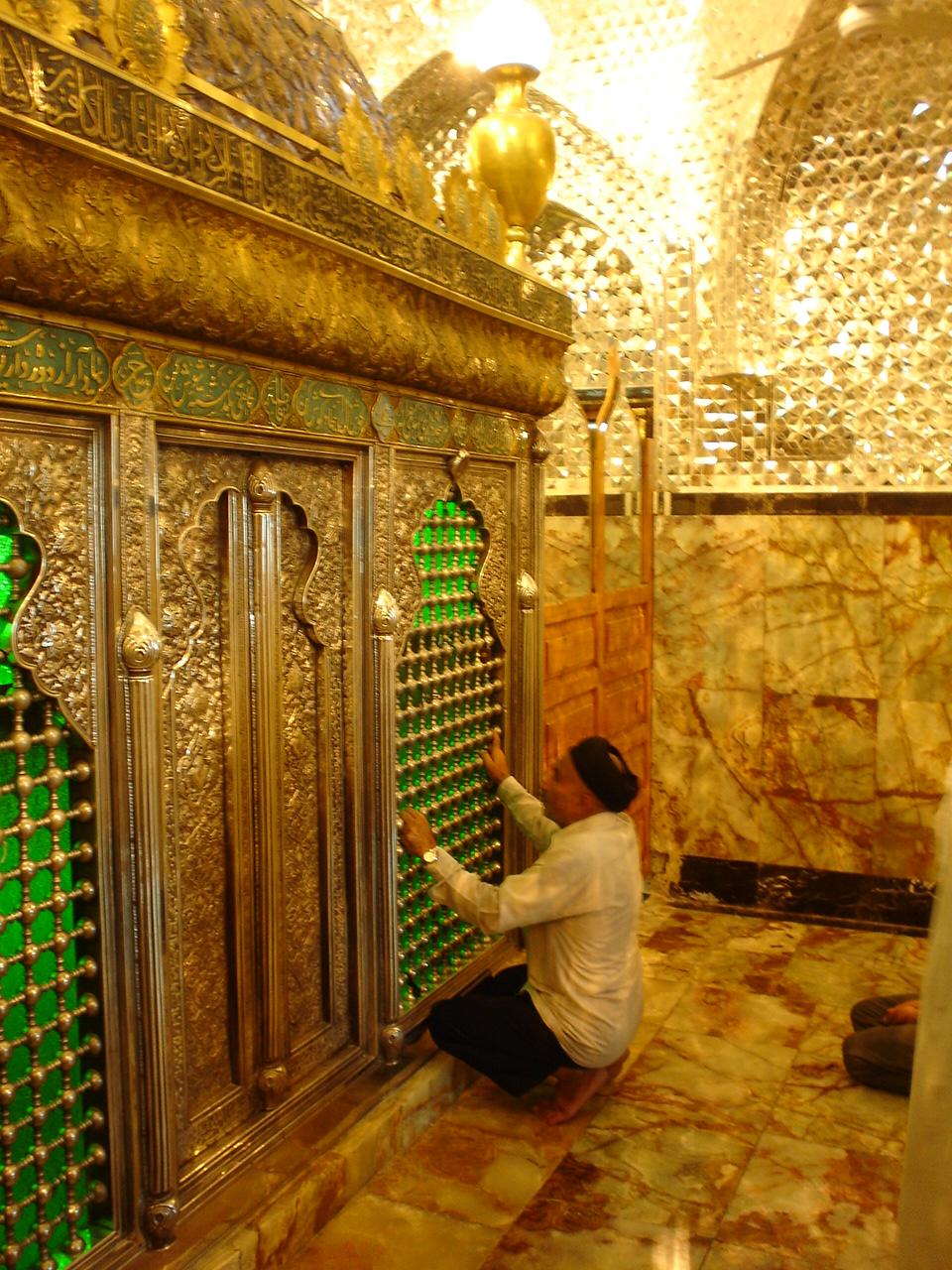
Interior of the tomb

Muslim traditions agree in stating that Daniel was buried at Susa, and a similar tradition was current among the Syriac writers. Al-Baladhuri (ninth century) stated that when the conqueror Abu Musa al-Ash'ari came to Susa in 638 CE, he found the coffin of Daniel, which had been brought thither from Babylon in order to bring down rain during a period of drought. Abu Musa referred the matter to the calif Umar, who ordered the coffin to be buried, which was done by sinking it to the bottom of one of the streams nearby.

A similar account is given by 10th-century Arab chronicler Ibn Hawqal who wrote:

"In the city of Susa there is a river and I have heard that in the time of Abu Musa al Ashari a coffin was found there; it is said to contain the bones of Daniel the Prophet. The people held it in great veneration and in times of distress, famine or droughts brought it out and prayed for rain. Abu Mousa Al Ashoari ordered that the coffin be encased with three coverings and submerged it in the river so that it could not be viewed. The grave can be seen by anyone who dives to the bottom of the water".

Istakhri gave a similar account and added that the Jews were accustomed to make a circuit around Daniel's tomb and to draw water in its neighborhood. Al-Muqaddasi referred to the contention between the people of Susa and those of Tustar. A slightly divergent tradition was reported by Ibn Taimiyyah who stated that the body was found in Tustar; that at night thirteen graves were dug, and it was put in one of these—a sign according him, that the early Muslims were opposed to the worship of the tombs of holy men.

William Ouseley, in Walpole's Memoirs of the East, described the Tomb of Daniel in Susa as being situated in:

"… a most beautiful spot, washed by a clear running stream and shaded by planes and other trees of ample foliage. The building is of Mahomedan date and is inhabited by a solitary Dervish, who shows the spot where the prophet is buried beneath, a small and simple square brick mausoleum, said to be (without probability) coeval with his death. It has, however, neither date nor inscription to prove the truth or falsehood of the Dervish's assertion. The small river running at the foot of this building, which is called the Bellerau, it has been said flows immediately over the prophets Tomb, and from the transparency of the water, his coffin was to be seen at the bottom; but the Dervish and the natives whom I questioned remembered no tradition corroborating such a fact; on the contrary; it has at all times been customary with the people of the country to resort hither on certain days of the months, when they offer up their prayers at the tomb I have mentioned, in supplication to the prophet's shade."

The current tomb was renovated and repaired in 1870 CE by order of Shia scholar Sheikh Jafar Shooshtari, the work was executed by Haj Mulla Hassan Memar. Later Mulla Hassan's son, Mulla Javad carried out further renovations on the site.

== Other recorded locations of the Tomb of Daniel ==
Name	Images	Location	Established	Remarks
Mala Amir		Khuzestan		The Jewish Encyclopedia noted that a five-day journey from Dezful, near Mala Amir, in Khuzestan of Iran, there was another sacred, tomb said to be that of Daniel.
Mosque of the Prophet Daniel, Kirkuk		Kirkuk, Iraq	7th century CE	This site is located in the Kirkuk Citadel. It was formerly a synagogue, but converted into a mosque during the reign of Umar ibn Abdul-Aziz. Every year, thousands of people from around the world visit the mosque to offer prayers and make pilgrimage to the grave of the Prophet Daniel and Hananiah, Mishael and Azariah who are allegedly buried next to him.
Tomb of the Prophet Daniel		Mosul, Iraq	1813 CE	Originally a mosque founded by the governor Ma'ruf ibn Ibrahim al-Sulayman, the tomb of the Prophet Daniel was discovered at a later date. The site was rebuilt in the 1980s, but it was completely demolished in 2014 by the Islamic State of Iraq and the Levant.
Mausoleum of St. Daniel		Samarkand, Uzbekistan	14th century CE	The tomb of Daniel in Samarkand was rebuilt in the 20th century. Inside, the grave is at least 18 m (59 ft) long, underneath a marble sarcophagus covered with a green cloth. According to the local legend, Tamerlane attempted to conquer Syria for many years, but was unsuccessful. One of his ministers suggested it was because the saint from the biblical times, Daniel, was buried there. Timur then sent his army to where Daniel was entombed in Syria, and after a fierce fight with the Syrians, was able to take some of his remains back to Uzbekistan. It is also said that on the day Daniel was entombed a natural source of water sprung up at that spot, and it is believed by locals that its water has the power to heal.
Mausoleum of Danyal		Tarsus, Turkey		The mosque and tomb complex was built atop some Roman-era ruins. The tomb was unearthed in 2006 during an excavation, and it was attributed to Prophet Daniel due to an erroneous legend that the Prophet was buried there.
Tarsus Grand Mosque		Tarsus, Turkey		The backroom of the mosque contains two graves which are attributed to Daniel and Seth. Next to both graves is the grave of the Abbasid Caliph Al-Ma'mun.
Tomb of Sidi Deniane		Jorf El Yhoudi, Oriental, Morocco		This site is located at Jorf El Yhoudi, known as Cliff of the Jews. The grave of Daniel, also known as Sidi Deniane, is located within the structure.

== See also ==
- List of mausoleums in Iran
- Islam in Iran
- Judaism in Iran
- Christianity in Iran
