= Kırkkaşık Bedesten =

Market in Tarsus, Turkey

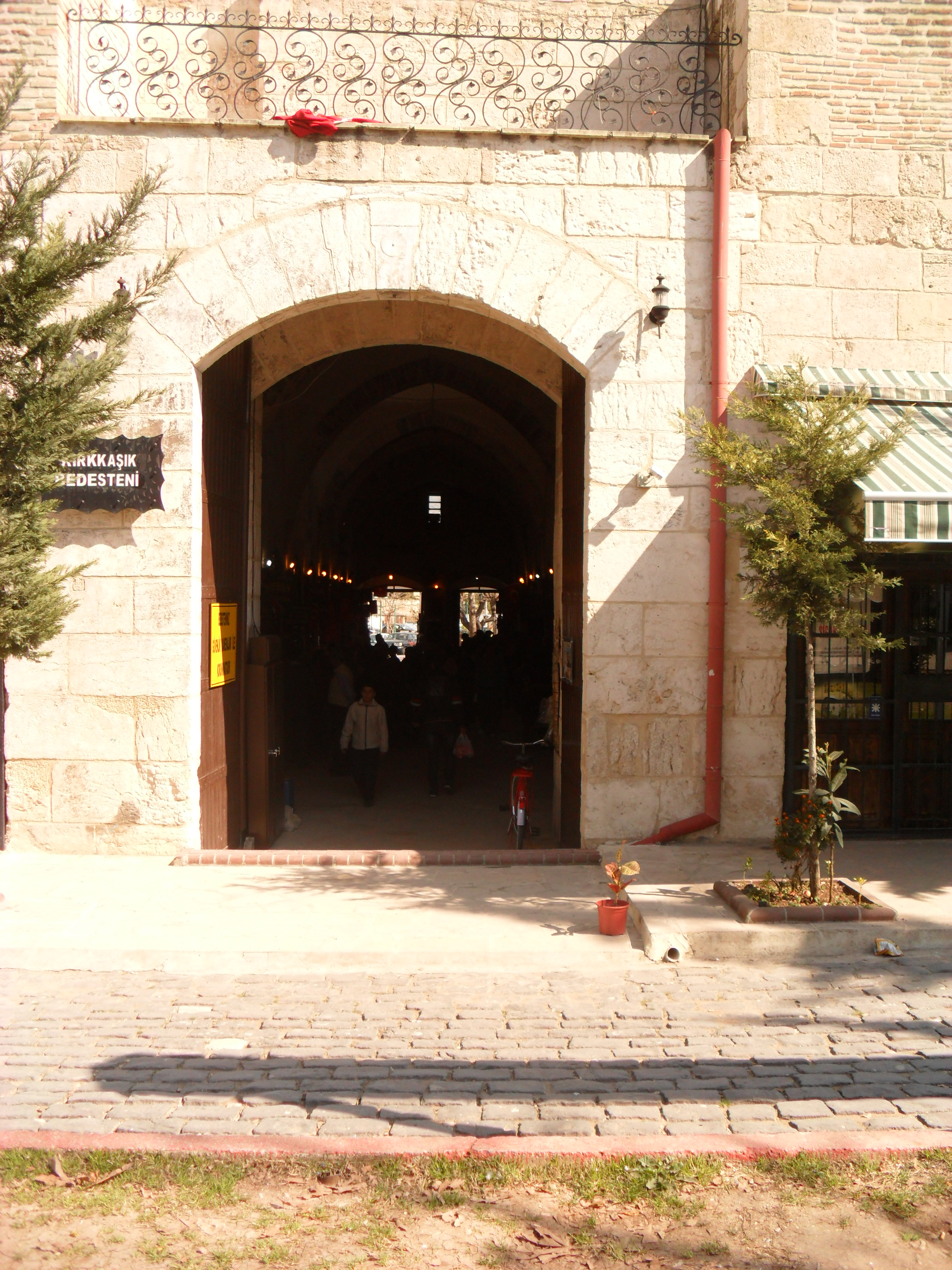
East portal

Kırkkaşık Bedesten is a bedesten (covered market) in Tarsus, Turkey. There are figures of lotus carved on the pediment of the bedesten. In the Medieval Age, the people named the bedesten Kırkkaşık (forty spoons) because they mistook the lotuses for spoons.

== Geography ==
The bedesten is in Tarsus, a district center in Mersin Province. It is situated at 36°55′N 34°54′E in Camii Nur neighbourhood of Tarsus, adjacent to Tarsus Grand Mosque

== History ==
In Medieval Turkish tradition, Vakıf was a source of revenue, endowed by the commissioners of the mosques and other charitable institutions for the exploitation and the maintenance of these institutions. Kırkkaşık Bedesten was an vakıf and hospice commissioned by İbrahim Bey of Ramazanoğlu house of the Ottoman Empire in 1579 to support Tarsus Grand Mosque. (İbrahim Bey was also the commissioner of the mosque). In 1960-1961 the bedesten was repaired and reopened to public use.

== Details ==
The construction material of the 600 square metres (6,500 sq ft) rectangular plan bedesten is cut stone. The roof is made of five domes. There are 18 rooms all of which are used as shops in the bedesten.
