= Sheikh Jafar Shooshtari =

Shia scholar (1810s–1885)

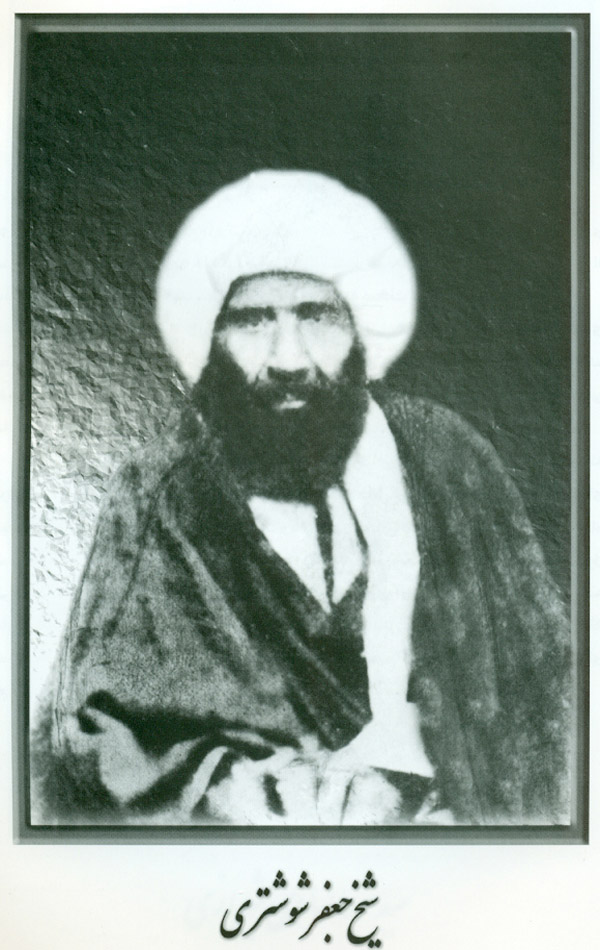
Sheikh Jafar Shooshtari

Sheikh Jafar ibn Hussein ibn Ali Shooshtari (born 1230 AH, 1814/1815 AD, died 20 Safar 1303 AH/28 November 1885) was a Shia scholar from the city of Shooshtar.

== Biography ==
He was born in 1230 AH in Shooshtar. He was a descendant of Ali ibn Hussain Najjar who was a great Shia scholar of 11th century AH. His paternal lineage is as follows: Jafar son of Hussein son of Hassan son of Ali son of Ali AlNajjar Shooshtari. He moved to Kadhimiya in early childhood with his father. He was taught by Sheikh Mohammad Al-e-Yasin, Sheikh AbdulNabi Kazemi and Sheikh Ismail ibn Asadollah Kazemi. He then returned to Shooshtar and then went to Karbala to study under Sheikh Mohammad Hossein Esfahani and Sharif ol Olama. Then he moved to Najaf to study under Sheikh Ansari. He returned to Shooshtar in 1255 AH and wrote "Menhaj ol Ershad" and built a Husseinya. In 1287 AH the tomb of prophet Daniel in Susa was repaired by the order of Shaikh Jafar in the hands of Haj Mulla Hassan Memar.

After spending some time in Tehran, he made a trip to Mashhad and then returned to Tehran again. Shah suggested that he should stay in Tehran, but he said that he wants to be buried next to his master Ali Ibn Abi Talib in Najaf.

== Teachers ==
- Sheikh Mohammad Hossein Saheb Fosool

== See also ==
- Mohammad-Taqi Shoushtari – Iranian Islamic scholar (1903–1995)
