= Grand Mosque of Tarsus =

16th-century Ottoman-era mosque in Mersin Province, Turkey

Tarsus Grand Mosque
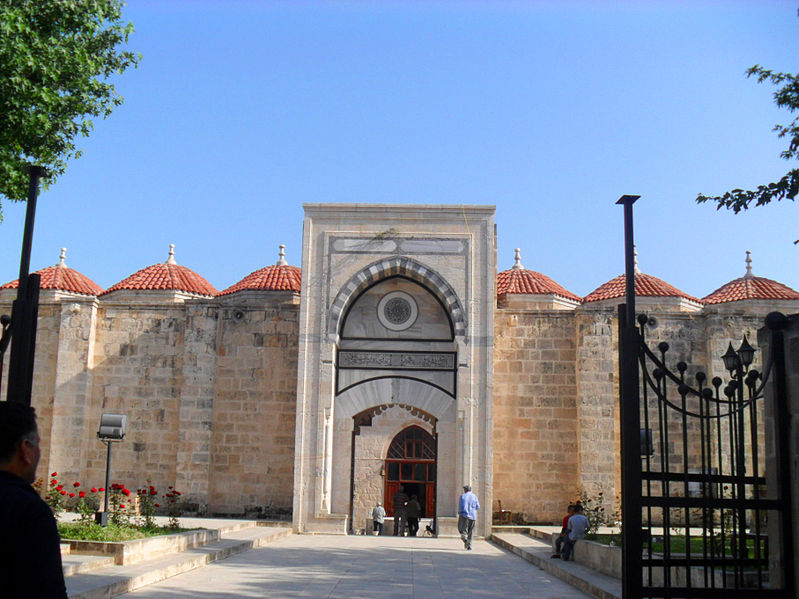

Religion
- Affiliation: Islam
- District: Tarsus
- Province: Mersin Province
- Region: Mediterranean Region
- Rite: Sunni Islam
- Status: Active

Location
- Location: Tarsus, Turkey
- Interactive map of Tarsus Grand Mosque
- Coordinates: 36°54′56″N 34°53′51″E

Architecture
- Type: Mosque
- Style: Ottoman
- Completed: 1579

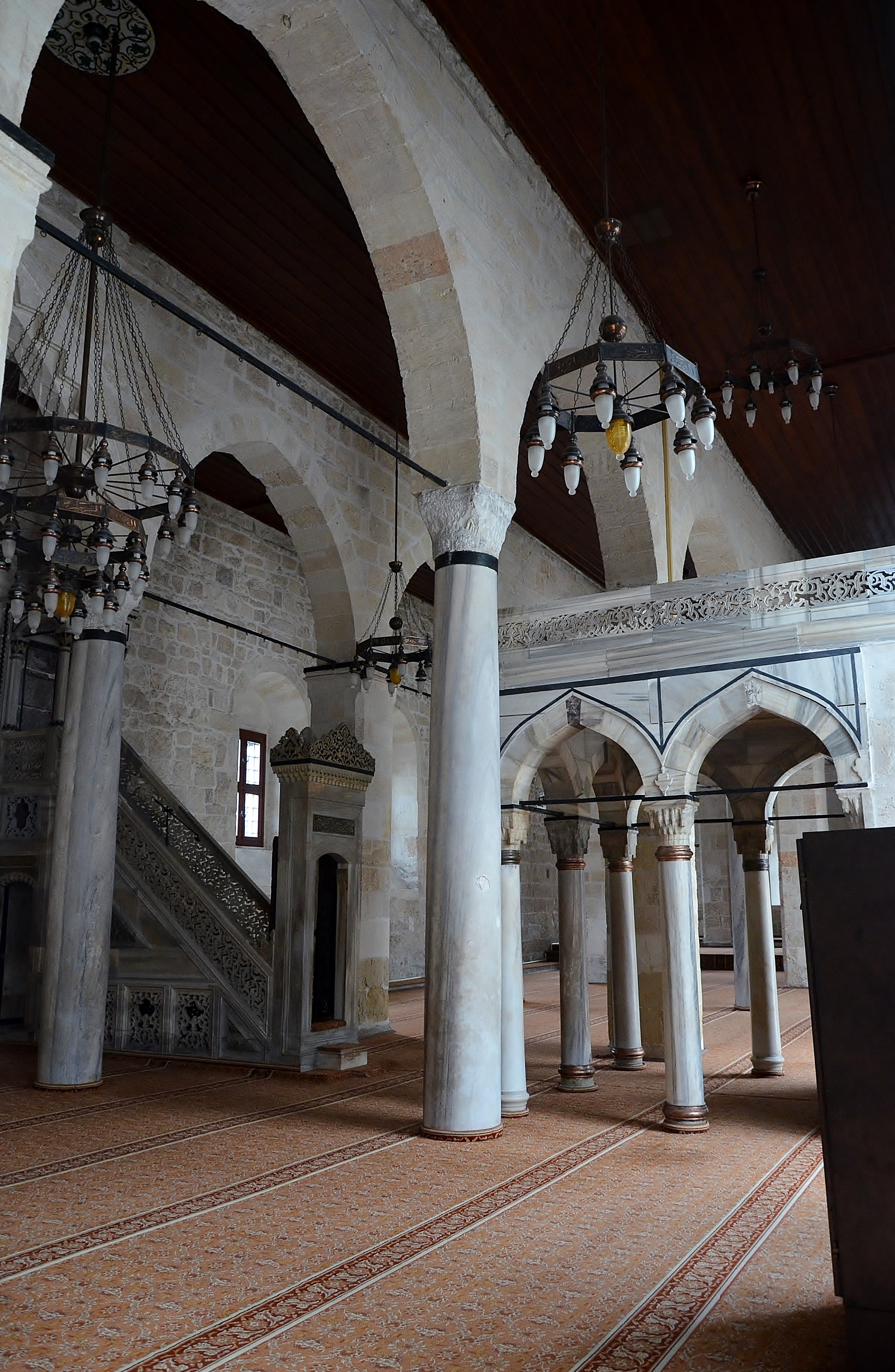
Interior of Grand Mosque of Tarsus

Tarsus Grand Mosque (Turkish: Tarsus Ulu Cami) is a mosque in Tarsus, Mersin Province, Turkey.

== Geography ==
The mosque is at the center of Tarsus in Camii Nur neighbourhood. It is the biggest mosque of Tarsus. It is close to St Paul's Church, only about 180 metres (590 ft) bird's flight away.

== History ==
The mosque had been built in 1579 during Ottoman rule. The commissioner of the mosque is İbrahim Bey of Ramadanid dynasty, a Turkmen dynasty which ruled the region before 1517 and continued as the vassal of the Ottoman Empire during the rest of the 16th century. But according to information plate of the mosque, there was an older mosque in the place of Grand Mosque which was built during the Abbasid (Arab) rule in the 9th century. After Tarsus was captured by the Byzantine Empire, the old mosque was transformed into a church. But in the 14th century Ramazanoğlu captured Tarsus and in 1579 the mosque was rebuilt. Kırkkaşık Bedesten a bedesten to support the mosque was also built in 1579.

== Technical details ==
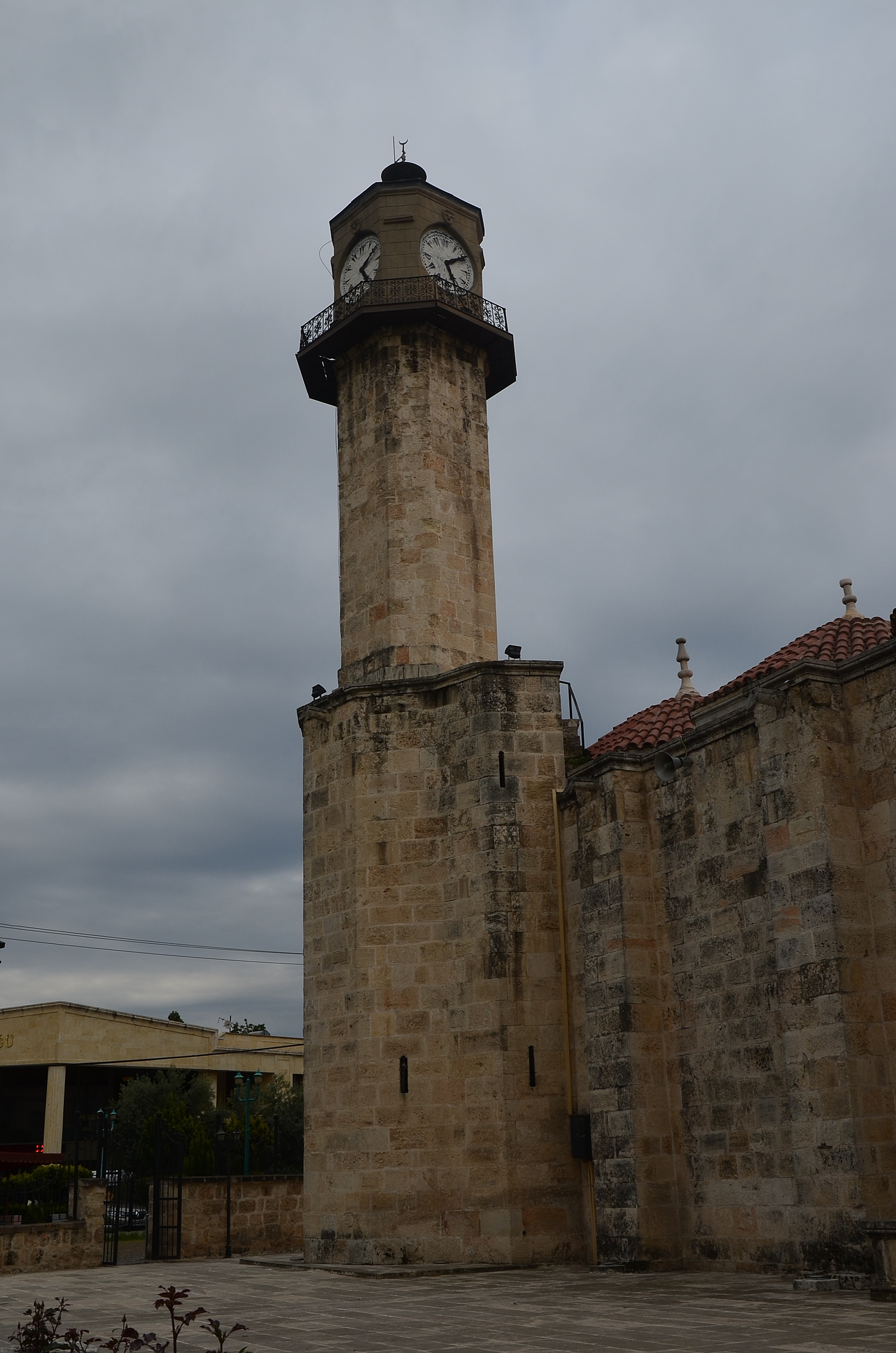
Clock tower at Grand Mosque of Tarsus

The entrance to mosque courtyard is via a monumental marble gate at the north. The nartex with 14 columns to bear 16 domes has been decorarated with tiles. The building material of the main building is carved stone. The columns in the main building have been connected with half pointed arch so called Iranian Arch. The pulpit and the niche (directed to Mecca) is made of marble.

== The tombs ==
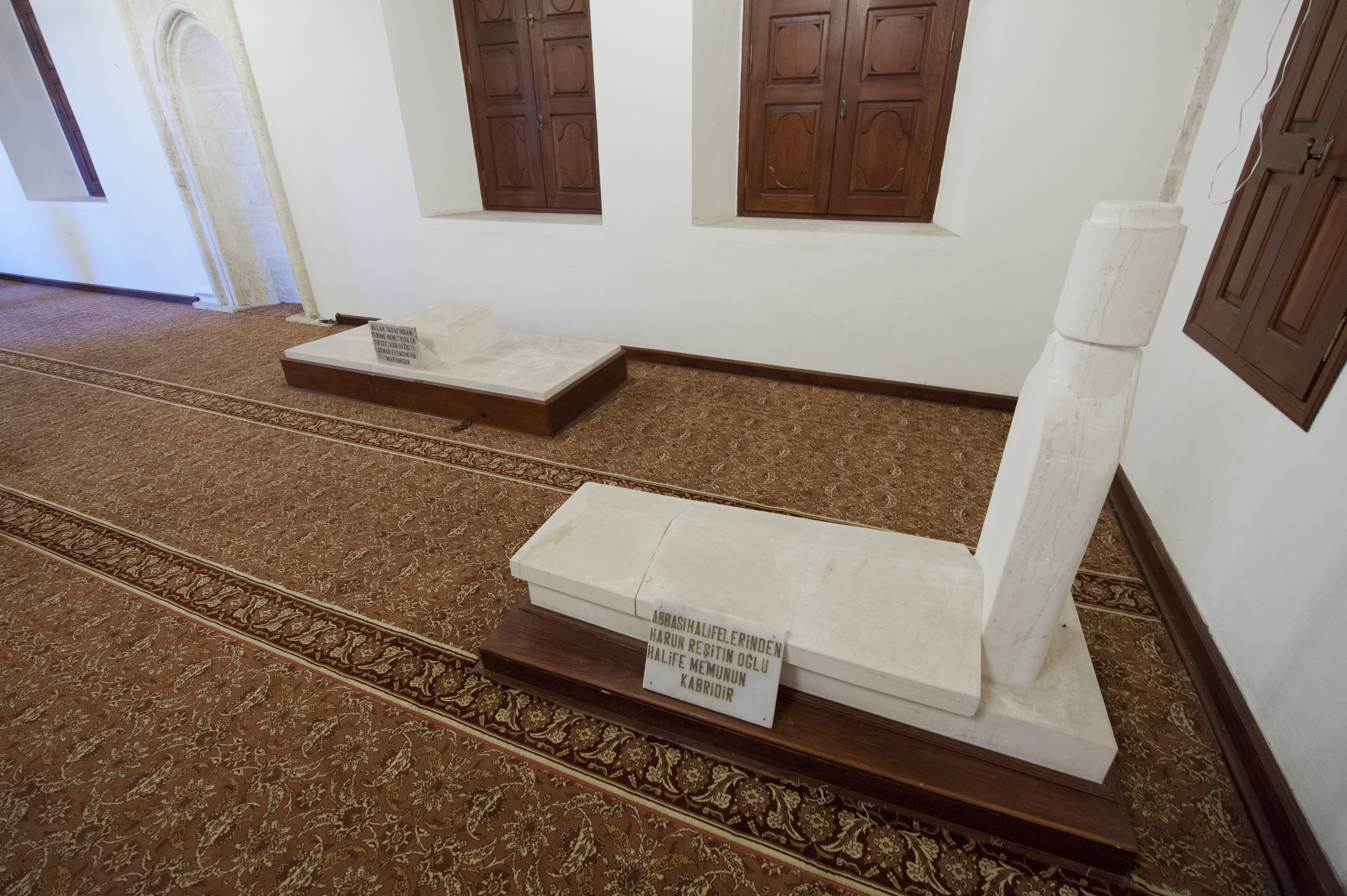
Tomb of Al-Ma'mun

At the east of the mosque there are tombs of Al-Ma'mun (the Abbasid caliph), Luqman and Seth who is believed to be the son of Adam.

== See also ==
- List of Turkish Grand Mosques
