= Saint Paul's Church, Tarsus =

Former church in Turkey

Coordinates: 36°54′51″N 34°53′52″E

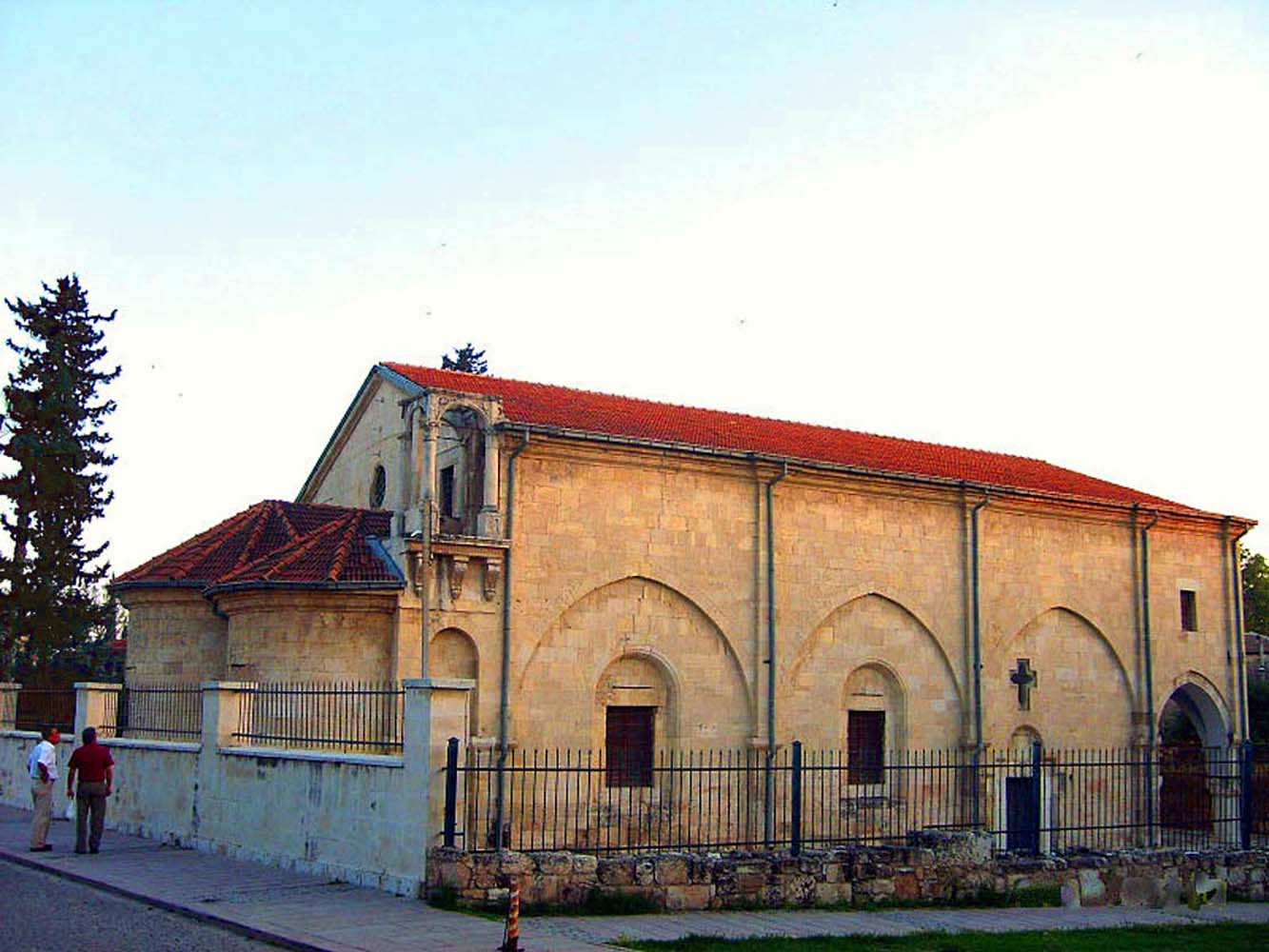
Church of Saint Paul

Saint Paul's Church is a former church in Tarsus, Mersin Province, Turkey. This church was built on the birthplace (of Saul of Tarsus), to commemorate him as a key figure in Christianity.

== Tarsus and the churches ==
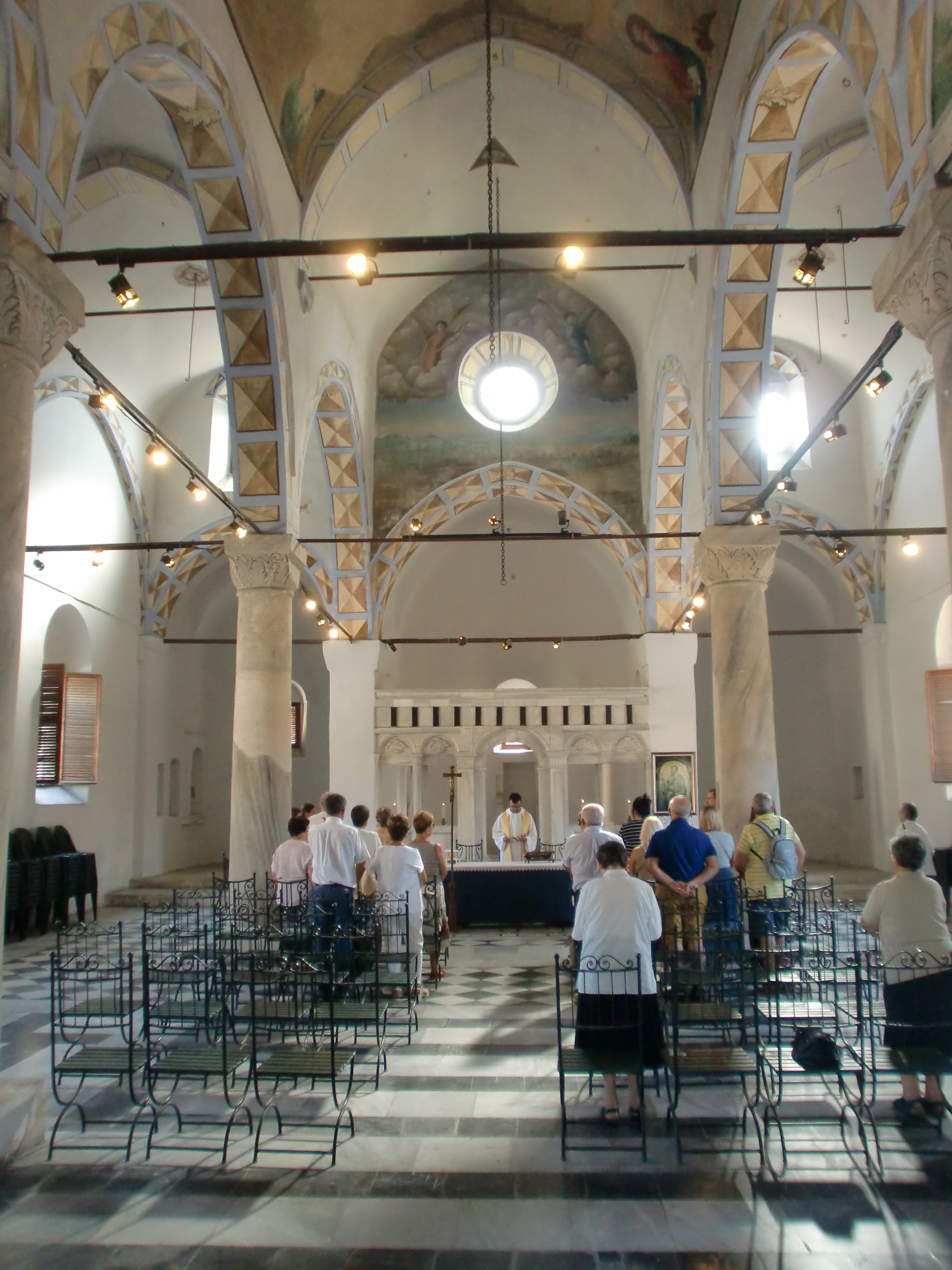
Interior of the church during the celebration of a mass

Tarsus, in the Cilicia of the antiquity, in what is now southern Turkey, was an important city during both ancient and medieval ages. The tombs of Daniel of the Bible, and the caliph Al-Ma'mun (786–833), are both in Tarsus. Saint Paul was a resident of Tarsus. He was born and lived in Tarsus as a Jew named Saul and, after converting, made a number of missionary journeys ending in his arrest and beheading by the Roman Emperor Nero in AD 64 or 67 on the 29th of June. After Paul's death, Tarsus continued as an important city of the area. It became part of the Byzantine Empire, the Abbasid Empire, the Seljuk Empire, the Armenian Kingdom of Cilicia, the Ramadanids and the Ottoman Empire.

It is not known if there were any churches established by Paul in Tarsus, but in 1704, P. Lucas wrote that there was a Romanesque church which had been built by Paul. V. Langlois visited Tarsus in 1851 and confirmed this. In his words, thick walls that resembled the Roman style, windows that are narrower outside than inside, and thick columns are noticeable, but no other records exist to substantiate this claim.

Medieval Mersin's most important Christian sanctuary was the Armenian cathedral of Hagia Sophia in which Leon I of the House of Rubenid was crowned by Konrad Von Wittelsbach, the Archbishop of Mainz and the representative of Pope, as the king of the Cilician Kingdom of Armenia in 1198.

The Holy Roman Emperor, Frederick I, drowned in Saleph (now called Göksu) river on 10 June 1190. His heart and inner organs might be buried in Saint Paul's Church.

== Saint Paul Church ==
According to tradition the building date of the Saint Paul Church is 1102, but the present structure, a domeless basilica, was built (or rebuilt) much later, in 1862. The entrance to its grounds is via an ornate gateway. The total area of the church building is 460 m^{2}. The longer dimension of the building consists of face stone walls and blind vaults. The interior measures 19.30 m × 17.50 m (63.3 ft × 57.4 ft). In the northeast corner stands an elevated belfry. The sides of the central nave window had been decorated by angels and landscape depictions. On the ceiling there are frescos of Jesus in the middle, and Matthew, Mark, Luke and John at the two sides.

== Restoration ==
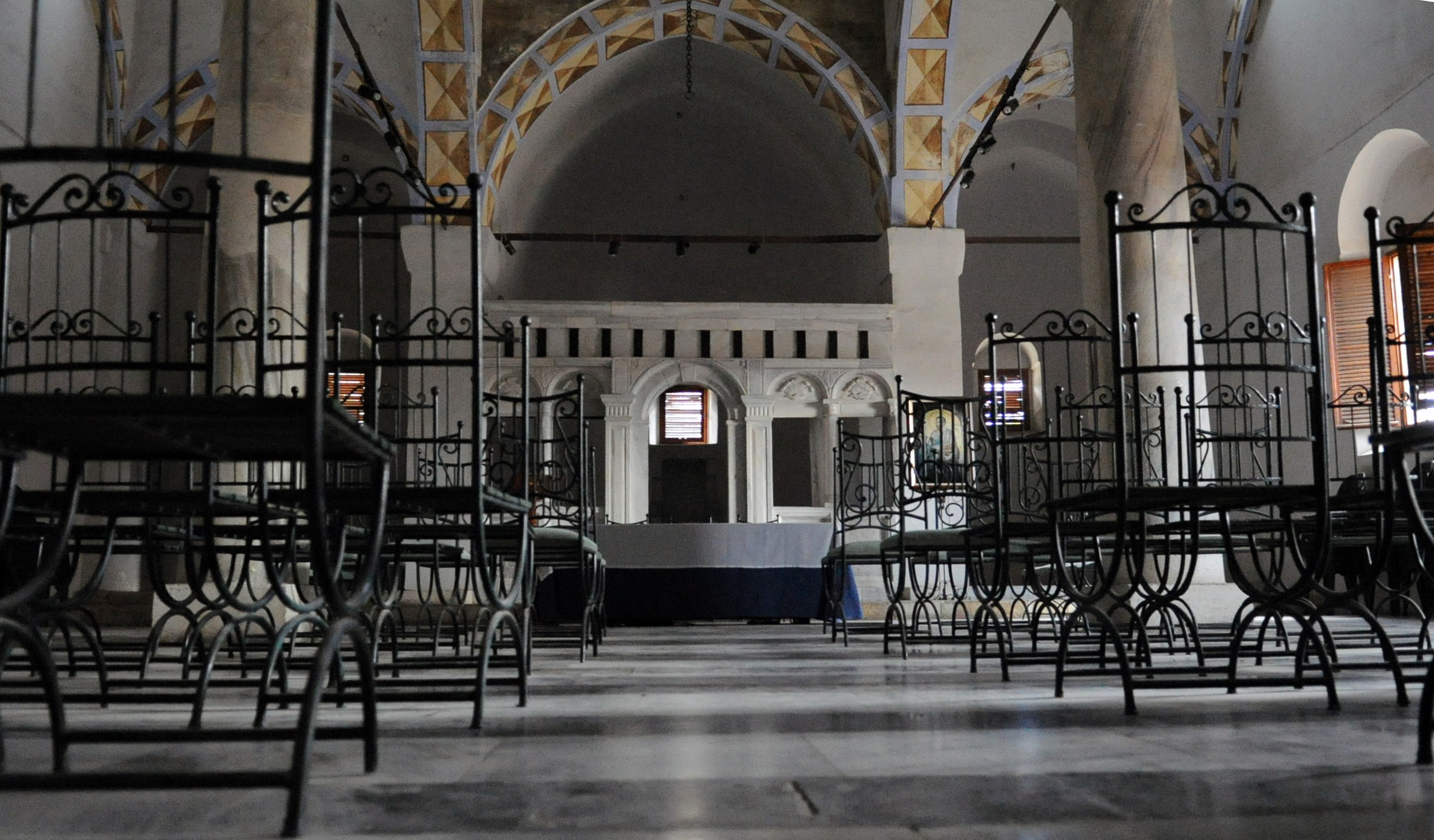
Interior of the church.

The church has been put under protection since 1993 and restoration work was carried out from 1998-2000. It is now under the protection of the Ministry of Culture and officially known as Monumental Museum. Although the church is open to religious services, because of the lack of community, regular services are not held; however, ceremonies are held for groups of pilgrims. During Saint Pavlos year between 29 June 2008 and 29 June 2009, there was a number of special ceremonies and the closing ceremony of the year was held in Saint Paul's Church in Tarsus.

The church and its surroundings are on the UN World Heritage Tentative List.
