= Abdidarun Complex =

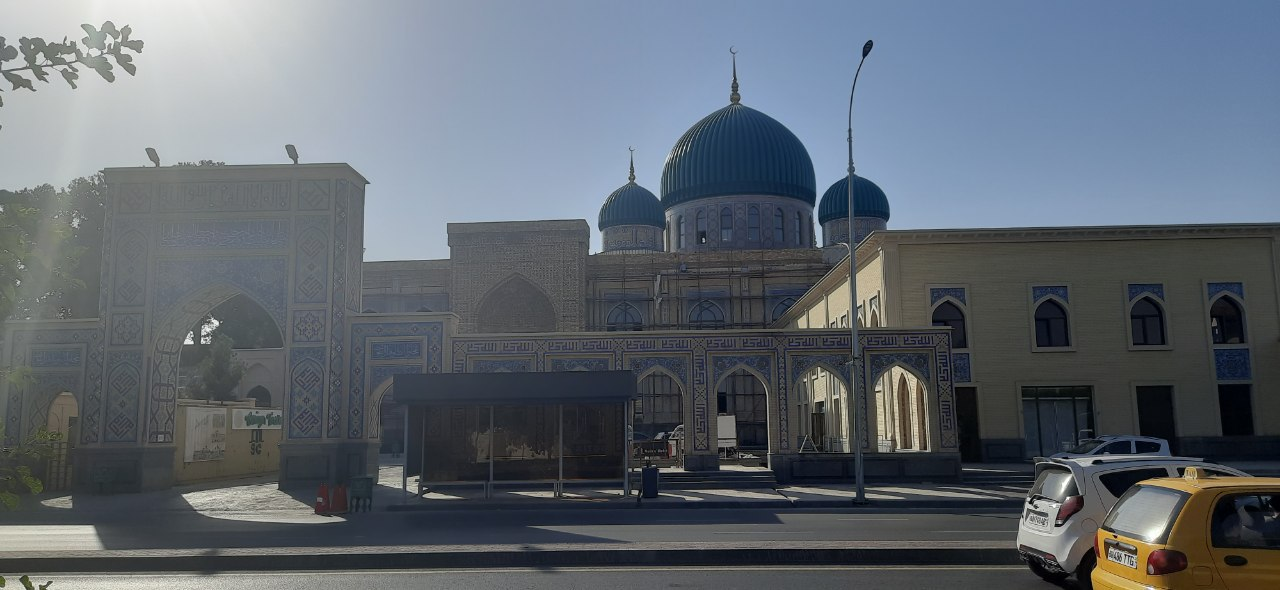
- Interactive map of the Abdidarun Complex area

General information
- Architectural style: Central Asian Architecture
- Location: Samarkand, Uzbekistan
- Coordinates: 39.64183062013838°N 66.9914865465794°E
- Year built: 11th century
- Owner: State Property

Technical details
- Material: baked brick

Abdidarun Complex is an ancient shrine located on the eastern side (inside, darun means inside) of the Samarkand fortress wall. Various buildings appeared and became an architectural shrine around the tomb of Allama Abd Maziddin, who lived in the 9th century. In the center, the largest building – the hall (15th century) stands out. Its facade, dome and wall decorations indicate that it is a product of the architecture of the Ulug Beg period. The shrine is a public building that served as a mosque. There is a mausoleum of the saint inside the hall. As a result of the renovation, the original appearance of the mausoleum building has changed. Since the pond in the middle of the courtyard is located on a spring, its water was kept at the same level in winter and summer, and it was considered healing among the population. The rooms around the courtyard and the mosque on the west side belong to the 19th century. Among the decorations of the mosque, the names of the masters have been preserved.

== History ==
The name of the complex was attributed to the Islamic jurist Abd-al Maziddin (in some sources Mu'iddin) known as Khwaja Abdi. He was one of the respected judges in Samarkand. He died around 861 and was buried according to Muslim custom in a garden near the outer city wall in the south-eastern part of Samarkand. This garden was the personal property of Khoja Abdi. Sources differ on the origins of Abd al Maziddin. Abu Tahirkhoja in the book "Samaria" calls him the son of Khoja Muhammad Yakub and the grandson of Khoja Abu ibn Usman. At the same time, the Islamic theologian Abu Hafsa Najmuddin Umar in his work "Kandiya" connects his genealogy to Caliph Uthman, and to Muhammad.

In the first half of the 12th century, by order of Sultan Sanjar, a small mausoleum in the shape of an octagonal cube was built over Abd al Mazeddin's grave. By this time, it is possible that other graves appeared around the tomb. The mausoleum turned out to be so small that almost all of its inner space was filled with the tomb of the saint. Therefore, in the first half of the 15th century, during the reign of Ulug Beg, after the neighboring area was cleared, a tiled building was built. In front of the mausoleum, rooms were built. Some time later, additional household rooms were added to the sides of the chamber and mausoleum. In the 15th century, the first mosque and a number of other buildings appeared in the complex, which have survived to this day. In the first half of the 19th century, a new mosque was built on the ancient foundation on the western side of the complex, but it was not preserved after the reconstruction at the beginning of the 20th century. At the same time, a gate was built in the northwest corner of the mosque, and a corridor was laid to it from the outside through the cemetery. In 1905, a small madrasa was built in the northern part of the complex, and in 1909, a larger L-shaped building was built in place of the old mosque in the western part. Among the paintings of the mosque, the names of 20th century masters Sabir Nadjara, Siddiq, Abduzahid and Abdugani Hasankhan Tailoqi have been preserved. In the same period, the pond was given an octagonal shape. Thanks to the restoration work carried out at the beginning of the 20th century, the Abdidarun ensemble has been well preserved to this day. At the turn of the 20th and 21st centuries, the elements of external decoration that disappeared in the Middle Ages, including the skufi of the dome of the house, were restored. The complex was surrounded by a porch with wooden pillars on the eastern side. A new minaret was built on the eastern side of the ensemble in the area of the Old Cemetery, and a new entrance was built on the northwest side of the complex on Sadriddin Aini Street.

The word "Darun" (translated from the Tajik language – internal, i.e. located inside the city wall) is different from Abdiberun Ensemble (birun – external, i.e. located outside). The area of the mausoleum is 15 hectares.

== See also ==
- Abdiberun Ensemble
- Khoja Doniyor Mausoleum

== Gallery ==
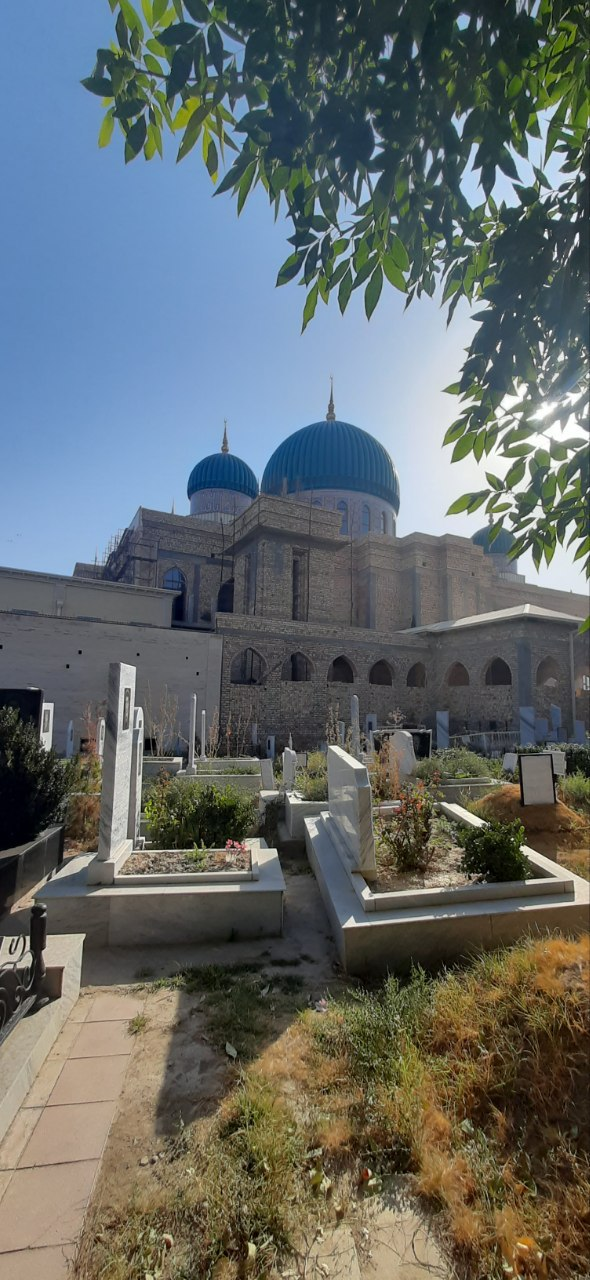
Cemetery

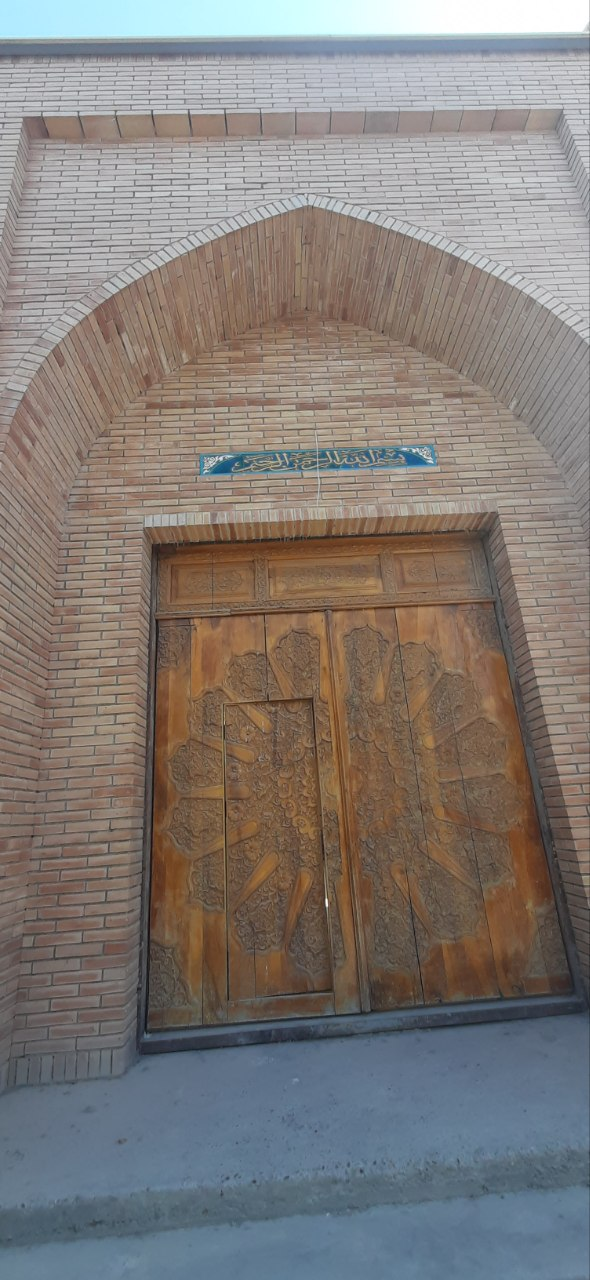
Mausoleum

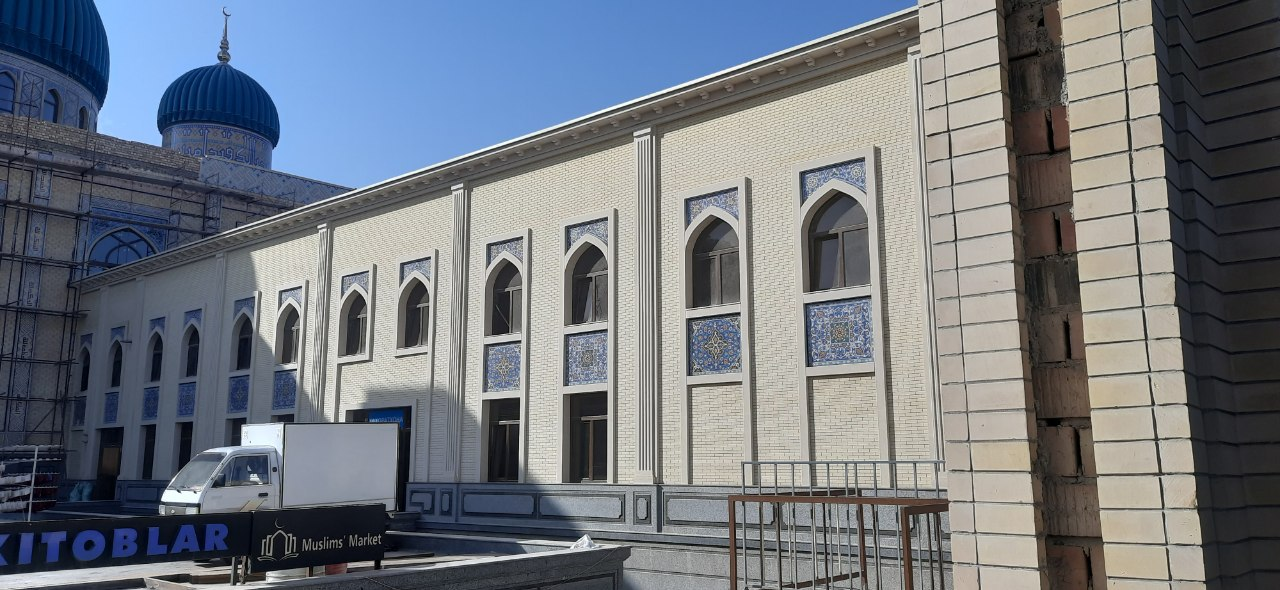
Mosque

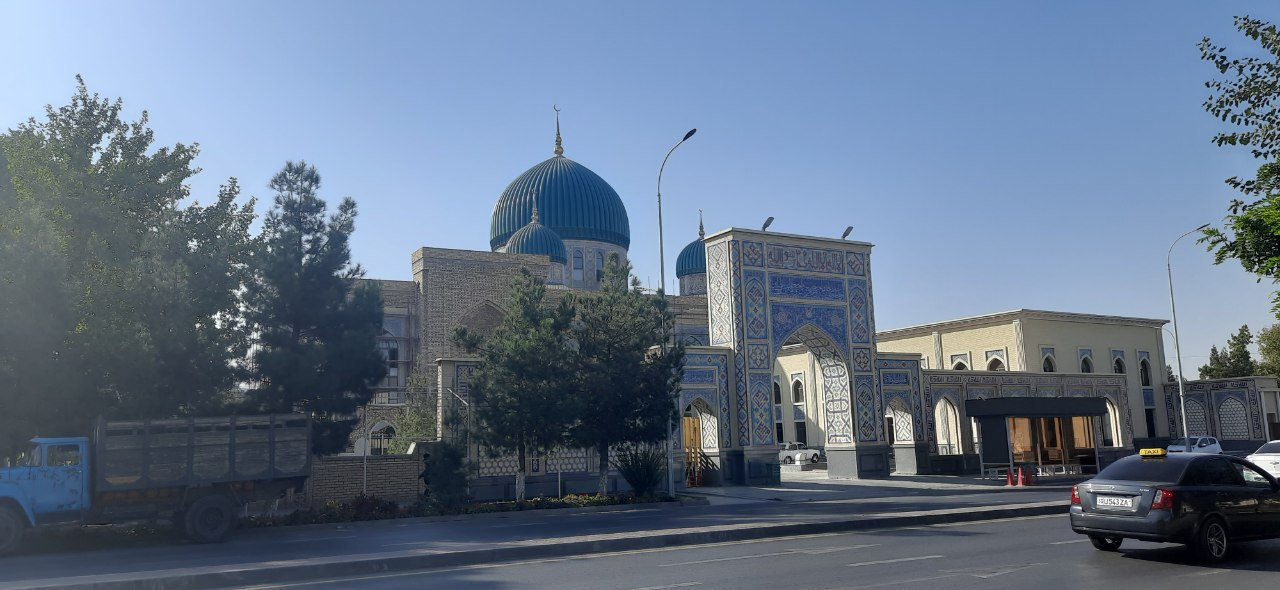
Overall view of the complex
