= Abdiberun Ensemble =

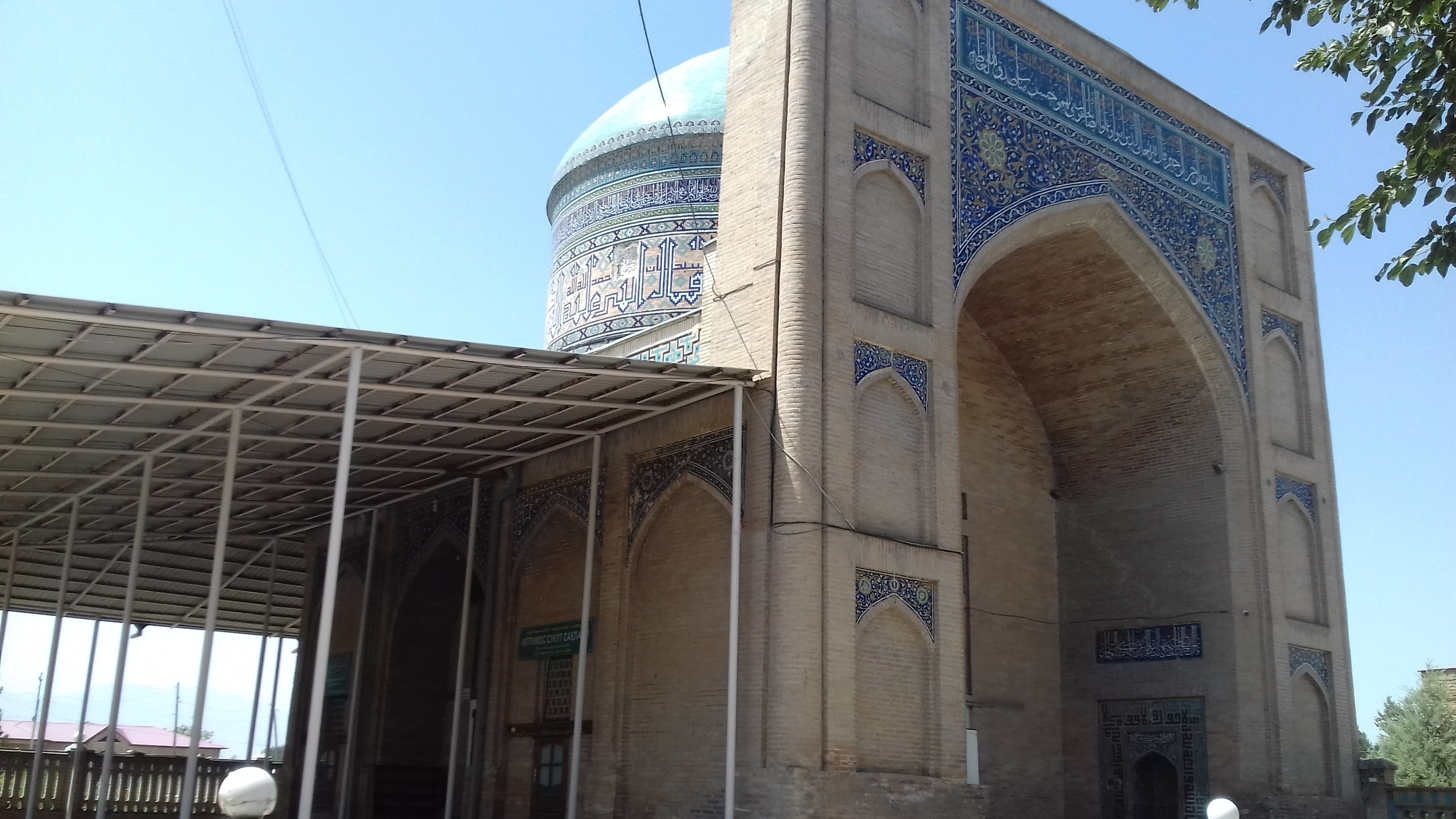
- Interactive map of the Abdiberun Ensemble area

General information
- Architectural style: Central Asian Architecture
- Location: Samarkand, Uzbekistan
- Coordinates: 39.6108°N 66.9752°E
- Year built: 1633
- Owner: State Property

Technical details
- Material: baked brick

Abdiberun Ensemble is an architectural complex dating back to the first half of the 17th century, located in the southern side of the Samarkand fortress wall, in the territory of Sarmozor neighborhood, Samarkand District, Uzbekistan. It was built in 1633 by Nadir Devanbegi, who was the prime minister of Bukhara Emirate. A mosque (15th century) with a curved arch was built next to the old grave, a public hall in the middle, rooms and stairs were built in the corners. The two-story dome, plinth, and walls were decorated with glazed bricks and tiled patterns. The door was opened from three sides of the pilgrimage. The mihrab is simple, the room is beautiful, it is a simple and graceful place of pilgrimage, there is a saint's grave in north side of it. The scene of the large courtyard features a pool and a gatehouse.

== History ==
"Abdiberun" ensemble is related to the name of Said Abdi ibn Yaqub, known as Khoja Abdi in Mowarounnahr. He served as a judge in Samarkand and lived a modest life. After his death, the Samarkand fortress wall (Doomsday Wall). He was buried in the cemetery of Okmachit village. In this regard, the word "birun" (translated from Tajik - outside, that is, located outside the city wall) began to be added to the name of his burial place, unlike the Abdidarun mausoleum. Another representative of the Abdi family, Al Maziddin, is buried in Abdidarun. Both ensembles – Abdiberun and Abdidarun are known in Samarkand under the name Khoja Abdi.

The worship of Khoja Abdi arose in Samarkand at the end of the 9th–10th centuries. According to assumptions, the Abdiberun tomb was built in the first half of the 12th century by order of Sultan Sanjar. However, during the Mongol invasion in 1220, Samarkand and its surroundings became ruins. Restoration of the tomb began only in the 17th century. In 1633, the influential representative of the Khan of Bukhara, Nadir Devanbegi, built a dahma over the grave of Abdiberun and built a brick wall around it. Soon, a house and a summer mosque were built next to the dahma. Later, the ensemble was surrounded by a stone wall, a rectangular pool was dug in front of the gatehouse and the house.

The Abdiberun ensemble was well preserved until the middle of the 20th century. In 1959–1960, filming of the film "Hamza" was carried out in the room. However, during the rule of the Soviets, the complex was not included in the list of attractions of Samarkand, and funds were not allocated for its maintenance and repair. The restoration of the ensemble began only in the 2000s. By 2013, the main construction and finishing works on its territory were completed.

== Architecture ==
The complex "Abdiberun" is located on an area of 4000 square meters and includes a house, a burial yard and a summer mosque. During the restoration works, cells connected to each other by underground passages were also found in the territory of the complex. The western side of the courtyard is occupied by the summer mosque, which is entered through a porch opened from the courtyard, the roof of the porch is set on wooden pillars. The main part of the burial yard is occupied by the Abdiberun dahma, a rectangular stylobate covered with marble.There are several ancient tombs behind the fence.

The hall is located in the southern part of the complex and consists of a domed composition. There are two entrances. Geometric patterns are made from polished bricks. The second entrance is on the east side. Opposite the house on the north side of the yard, in the shade of the trees, is a square house. A small minaret was built in 2000 on the left side of the main entrance of the hall.

== Gallery ==
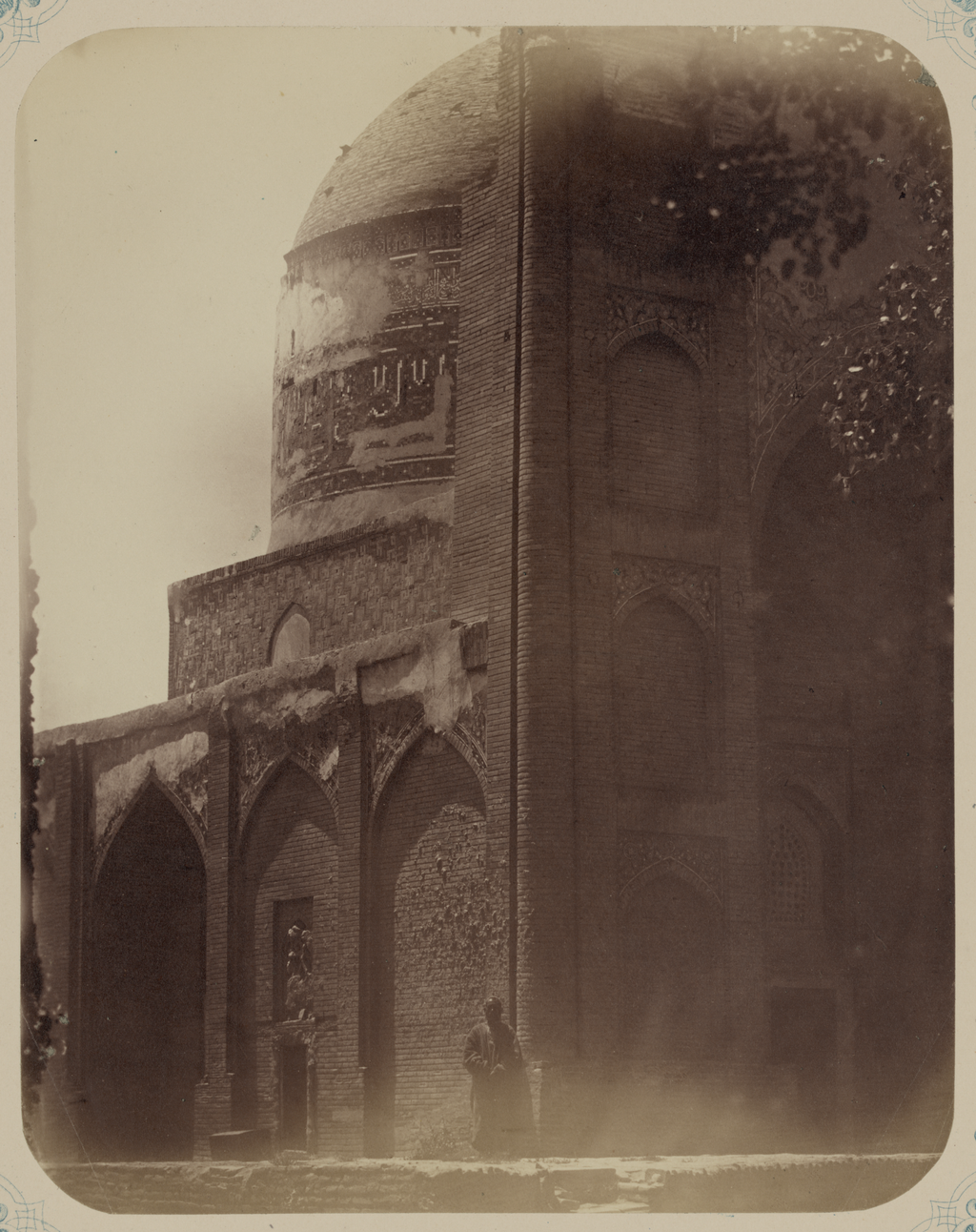
View of the mosque from the northwest in the 19th century

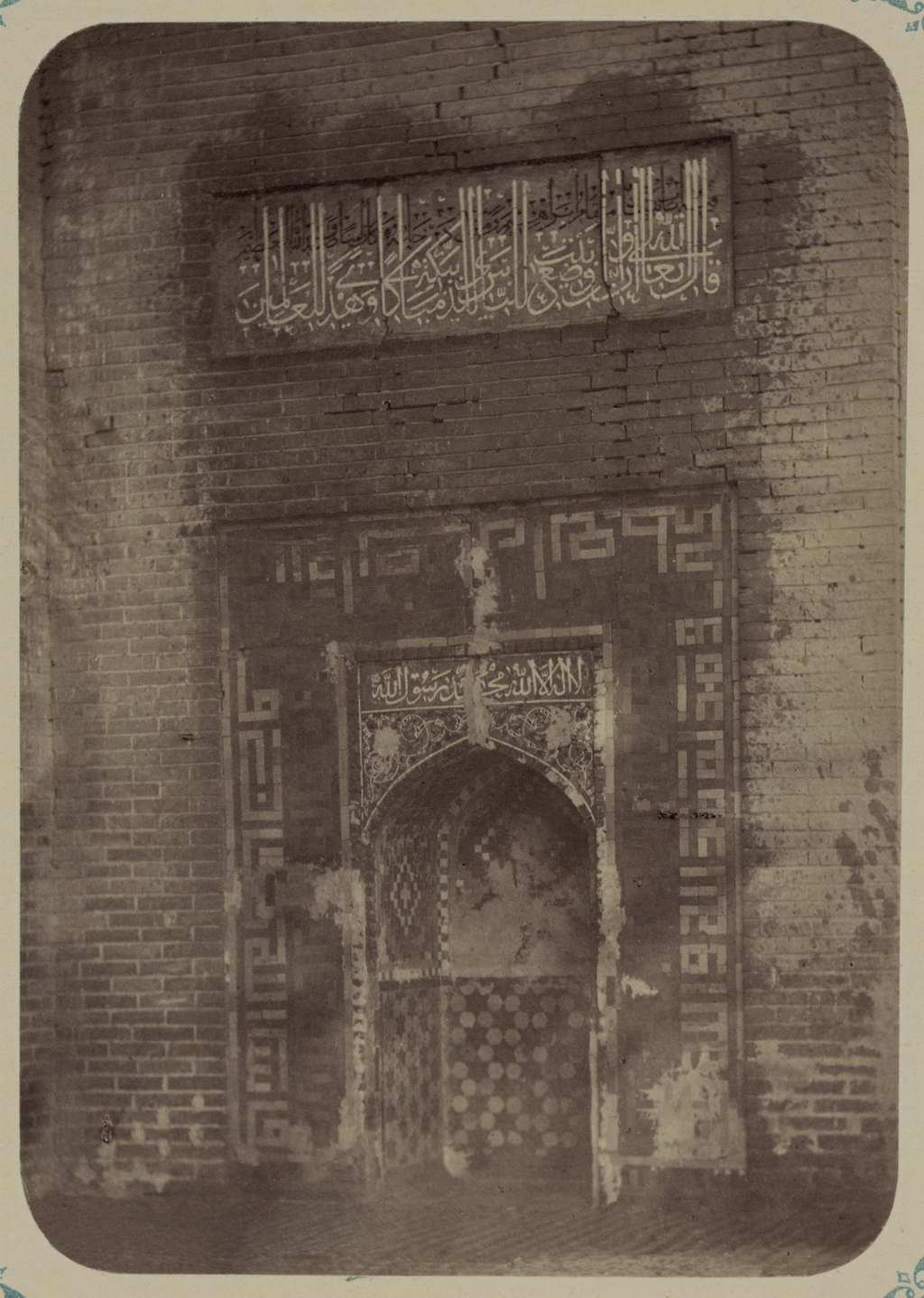
Mihrab of the Mosque of Khodzha Abdu-Berun. Photographed in the 19th century

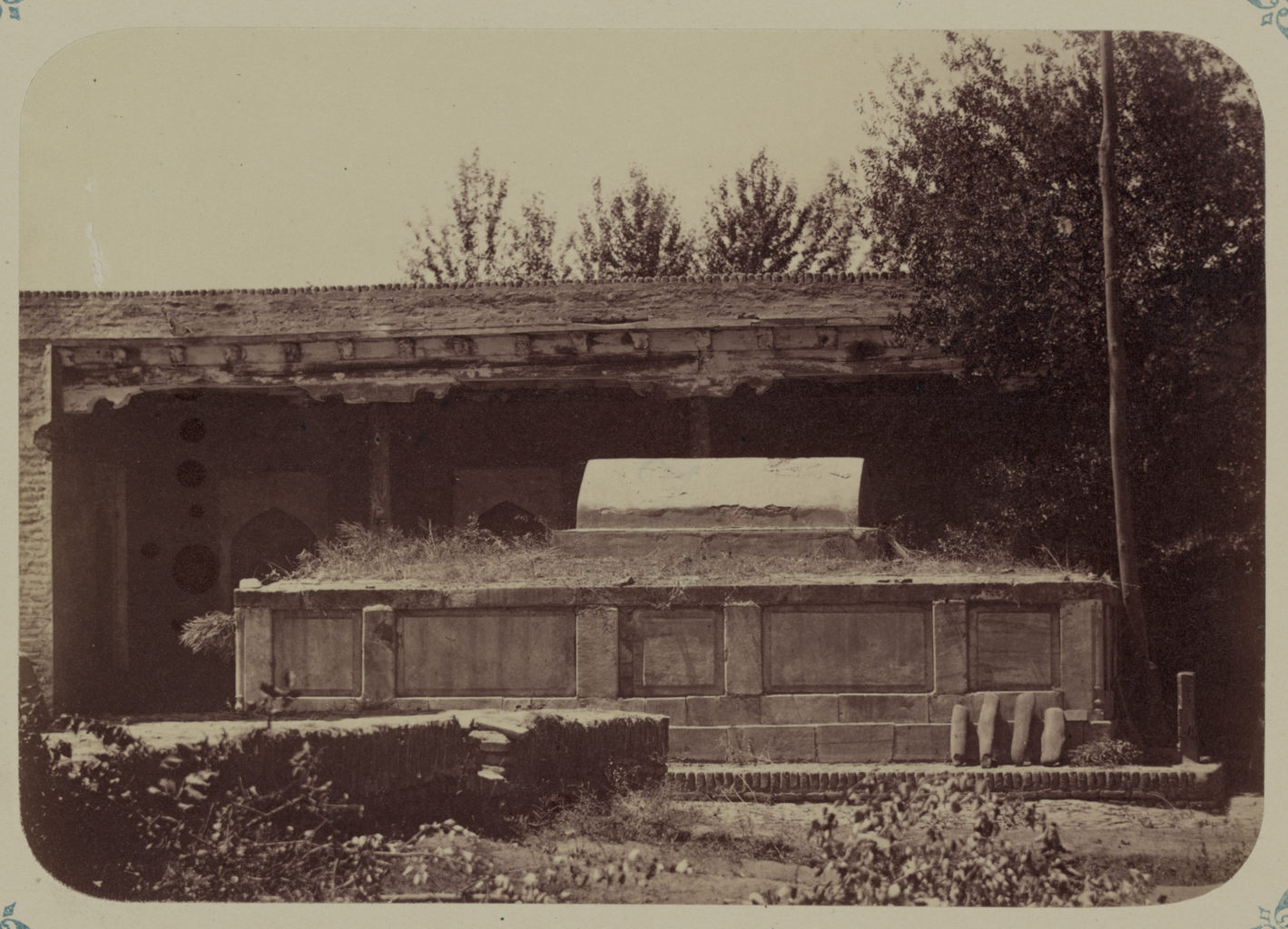
Mosque of Khodzha Abdu-Berun

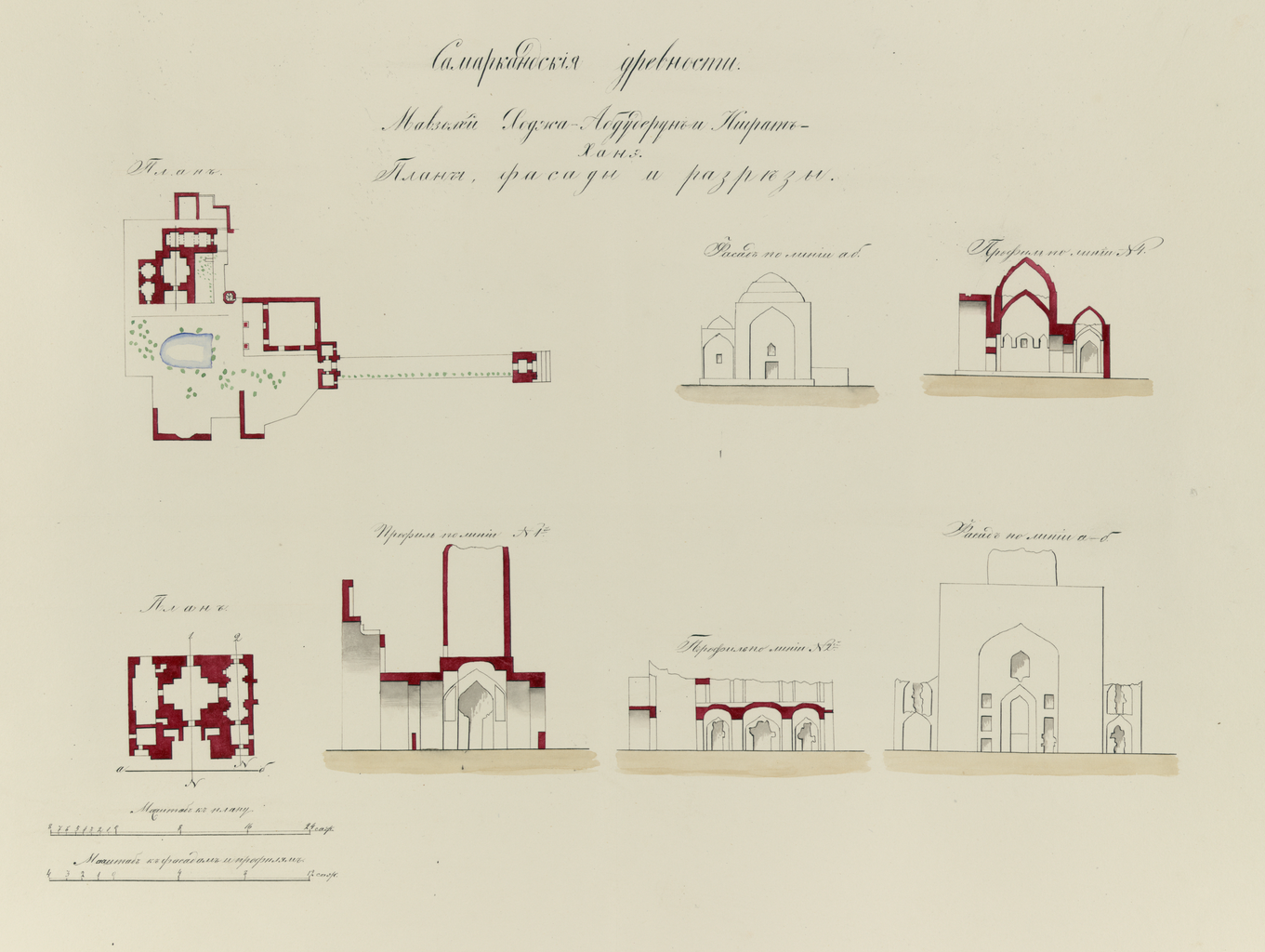
Scheme of the Abdiberun Ensemble
