= Khoja Doniyor Mausoleum =

Khoja Doniyor mausoleum
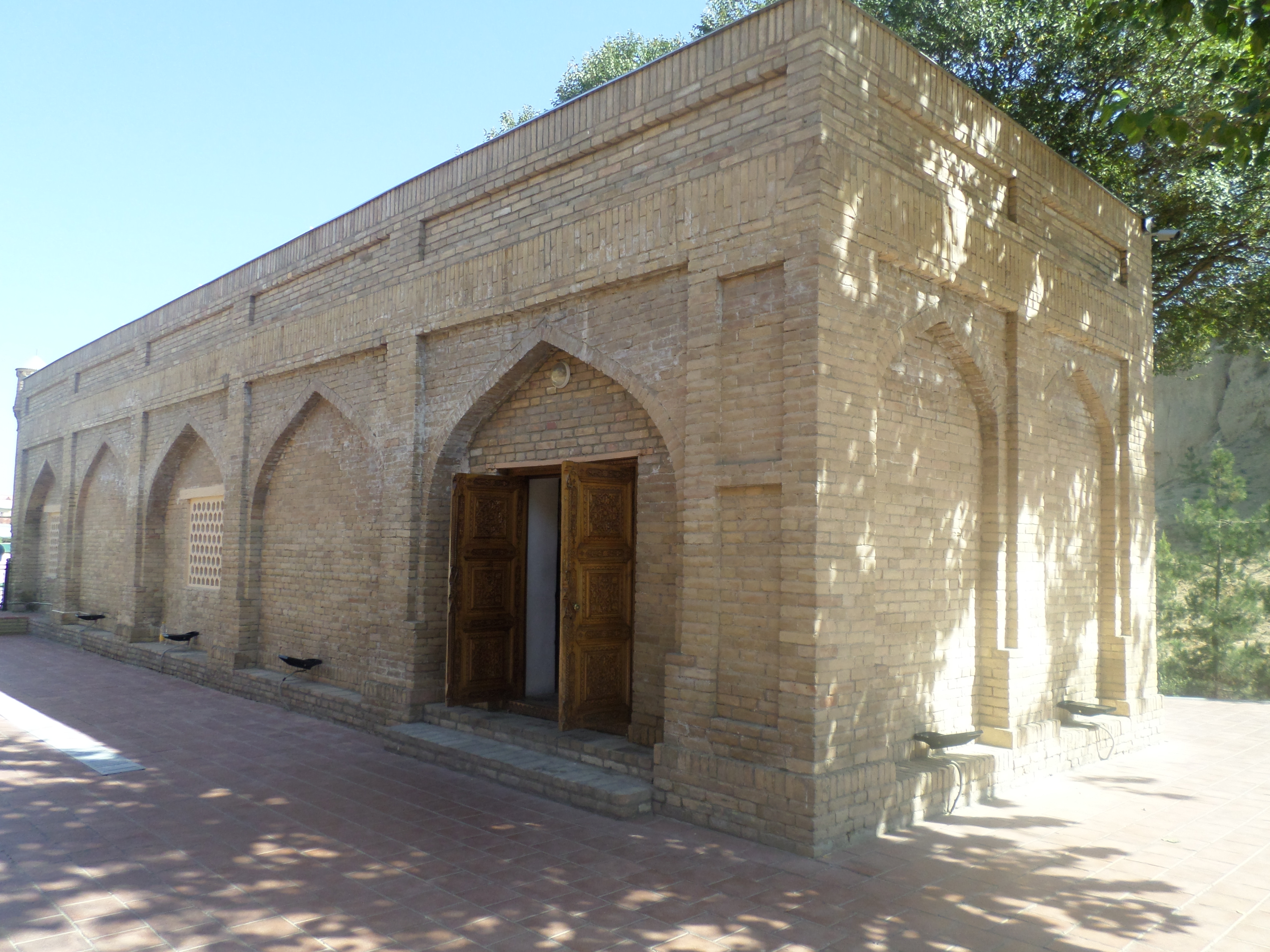
- Interactive map of the Khoja Doniyor mausoleum area

General information
- Architectural style: 39°40′24″N 66°59′40″E
- Location: Samarkand, Uzbekistan
- Year built: 15th century
- Owner: Amir Temur

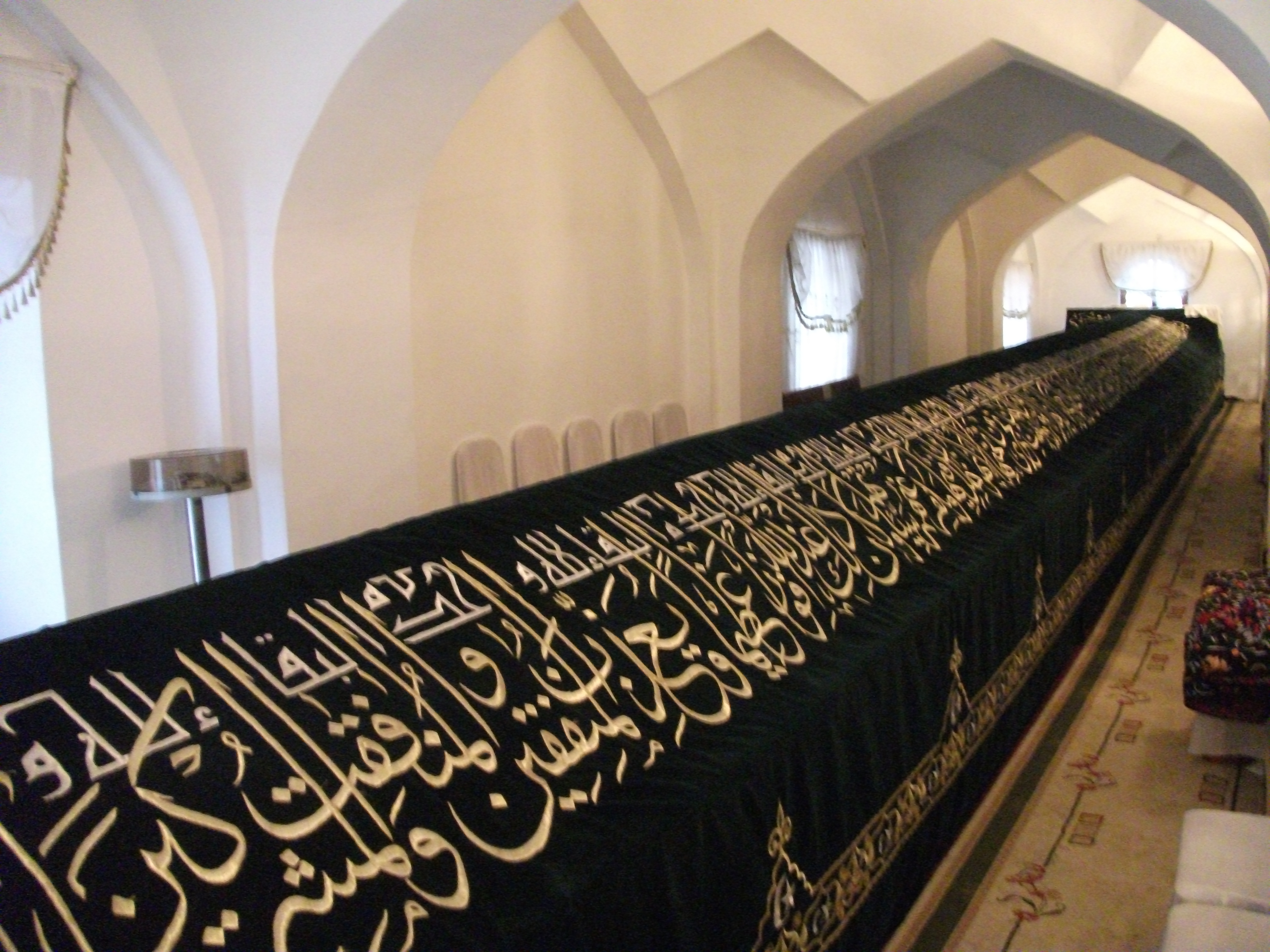
The grave of wali Daniyar

Khoja Doniyor mausoleum is an architectural monument in Samarkand (built at the beginning of the 20th century). It is located in the east side of the Afrosiyab fortress along the Siyob stream. It was built on the grave of Wali Khoja Doniyor. It consists of a rectangular room with a gable and five domes (the length is about 15 m). The pediment (on the north side) and the domed, cup-shaped patterns on both sides of it were decorated with ganch carving, and the sides are decorated with arches. There is an oblong hut inside the mausoleum. The spring near the mausoleum is considered a blessing among the people. According to Abu Tahirkhoja's work "Samaria", Khoja Doniyor (Doniyol) was one of the companions of Kusam Ibn Abbas.

== History ==
Khoja Doniyor mausoleum is one of the most prestigious and famous shrines in Samarkand. Representatives of three religions – Islam, Christianity and Judaism – visit Khoja Doniyor's mausoleum as equally sacred and blessed. Doniyor, Daniil, Daniel is the name of one saint in Muslim, Christian and Jewish literature.

According to the interpretation of the Bible, Daniel, translated from the Hebrew language, means "God is my judge". Daniel was born in Jerusalem in 603 BC and belongs to the descendants of King David and Solomon. In 586 BC, after the conquest of Israel by the Babylonian king Nebuchadnezzar, Daniel was taken to Babylon (Iraq) with the children of other nobles. They studied different subjects. Daniel was considered one of the most talented young people. He showed the strength of his religious beliefs, abstained from drinking wine and alcohol, and ate only vegetables and followed religious rules. That's why his wisdom and religious piety are described as a reward from Allah according to the interpretation of the Bible. Because of the wise interpretation of Novokhudonosor's dream, the king rewarded him with large gifts and added him to the ranks of his close people. Upon the arrival of the Persians, King Darius promoted Daniel to the leadership of the country. Such compliments make jealous the courtiers close to the king. These people slandered Daniel and threw him into a den of hungry lions by the king's order, but the animals did not touch him. Then, by the order of the king, the slanderers themselves are thrown into the pit, and the lions tear them to pieces. The history of construction of Khoja Doniyor mausoleum is related to the Central Asian commander, strategist and conqueror Amir Timur (Tamerlan), who in the 1300s – later 1400s lived in Samarkand, and built a mosque in the site of Doniyor's funeral. Many repairs have been carried out in the mausoleum. The shrine was surrounded by a wall and a 3-part staircase was built to reach the shrine. At the same time, the tomb was covered with onyx and black marble. An early 20th century photograph shows the mausoleum as having six domes, but today it has five domes, which one of them may have been destroyed and rebuilt. On the north side of the mausoleum, the upper part of the building is decorated with domes made of baked bricks. They were built in European style. In the interior, shield-shaped anchors and arches supporting the domes were used in that period.

In 1996, the 15th Patriarch of Moscow and all Rus' Alexy II, during his visit to Uzbekistan, visited Samarkand, in particular the Khoja Doniyor mausoleum. Near the crypt there was a dried pistachio tree, which the patriarch decided to consecrate, and, according to an urban legend for tourists, after some time the tree came to life again.

In 2001, the city of Samarkand and its historical architectural and archaeological monuments, including the mausoleum and the Khoja Doniyor complex, were included in the UNESCO World Heritage List under the title "Samarkand – the crossroads of cultures.”

== Gallery ==
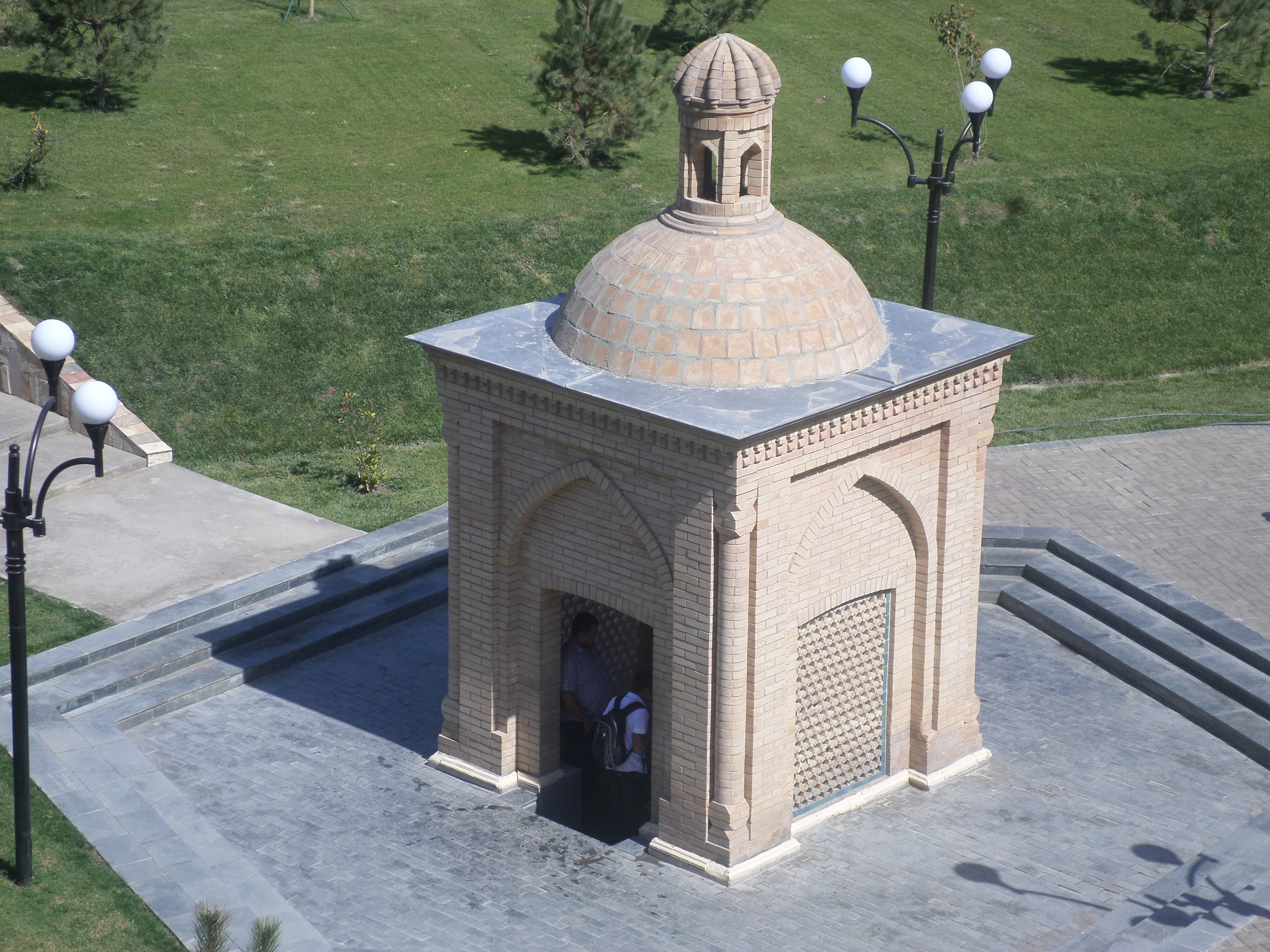
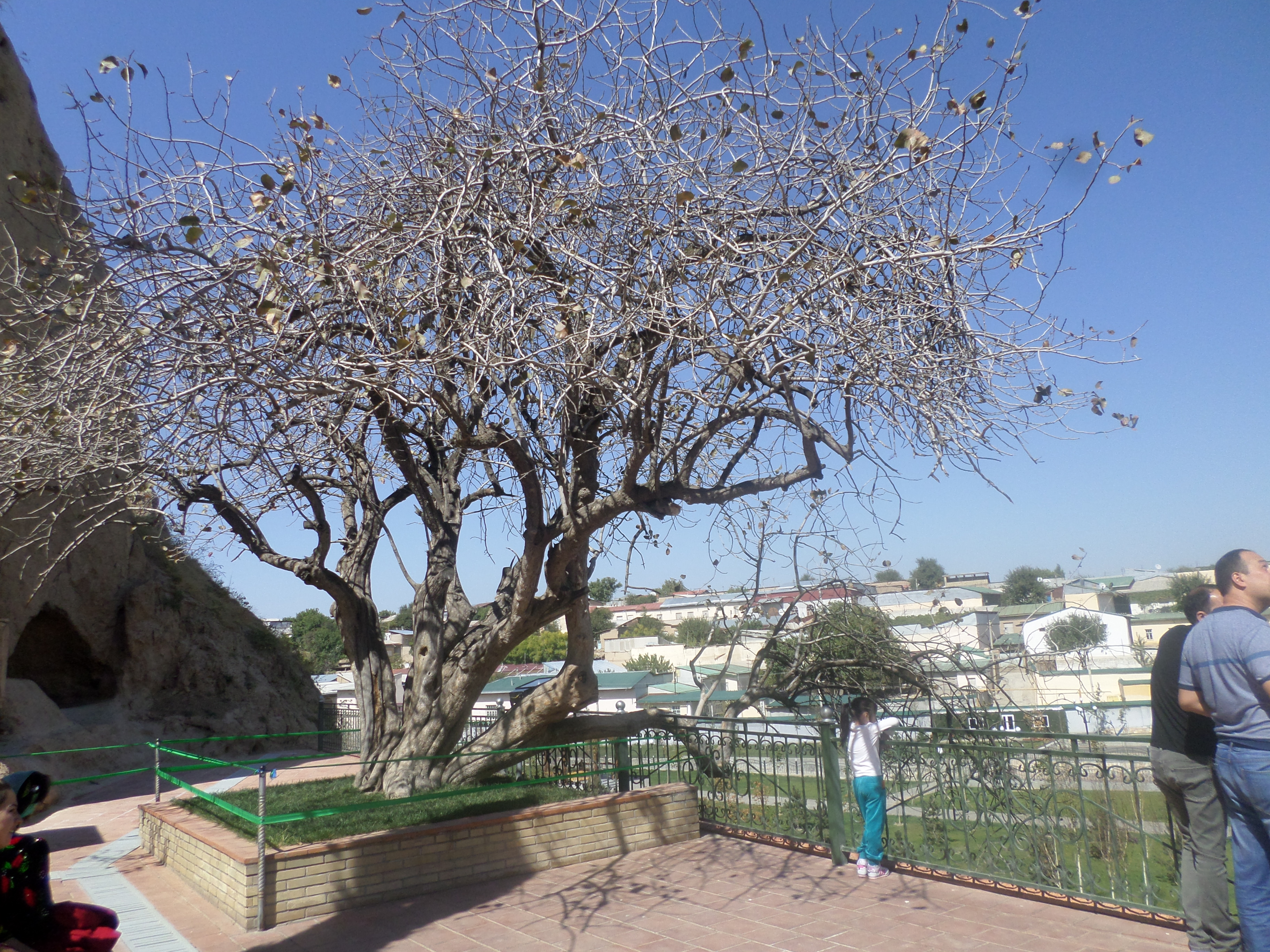
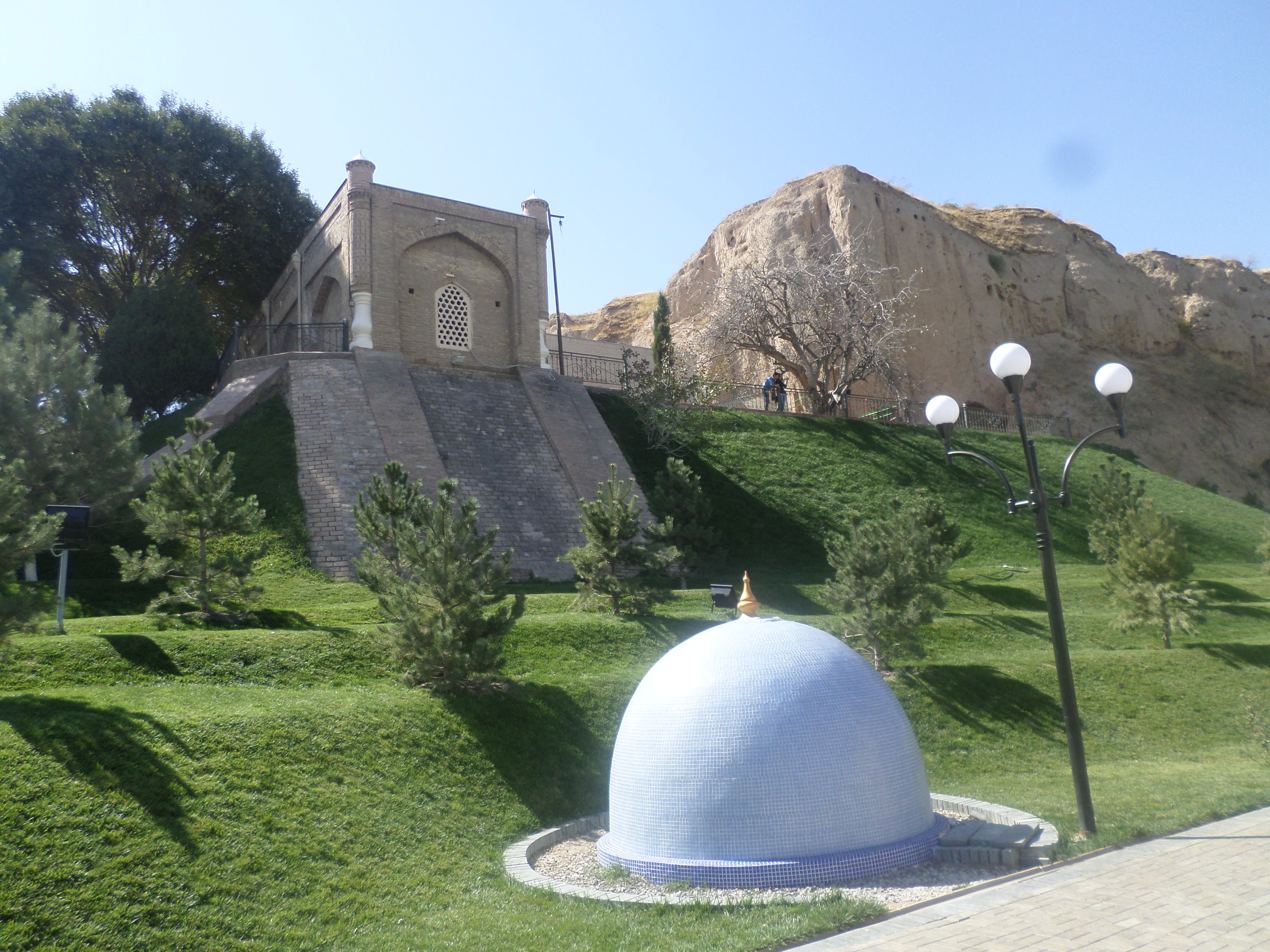
