= Kisecik Canyon =

Canyon in Mersin Province, Turkey

Kisecik Canyon Kisecik Kanyonu
- Hidden Heaven (Saklı Cennte)
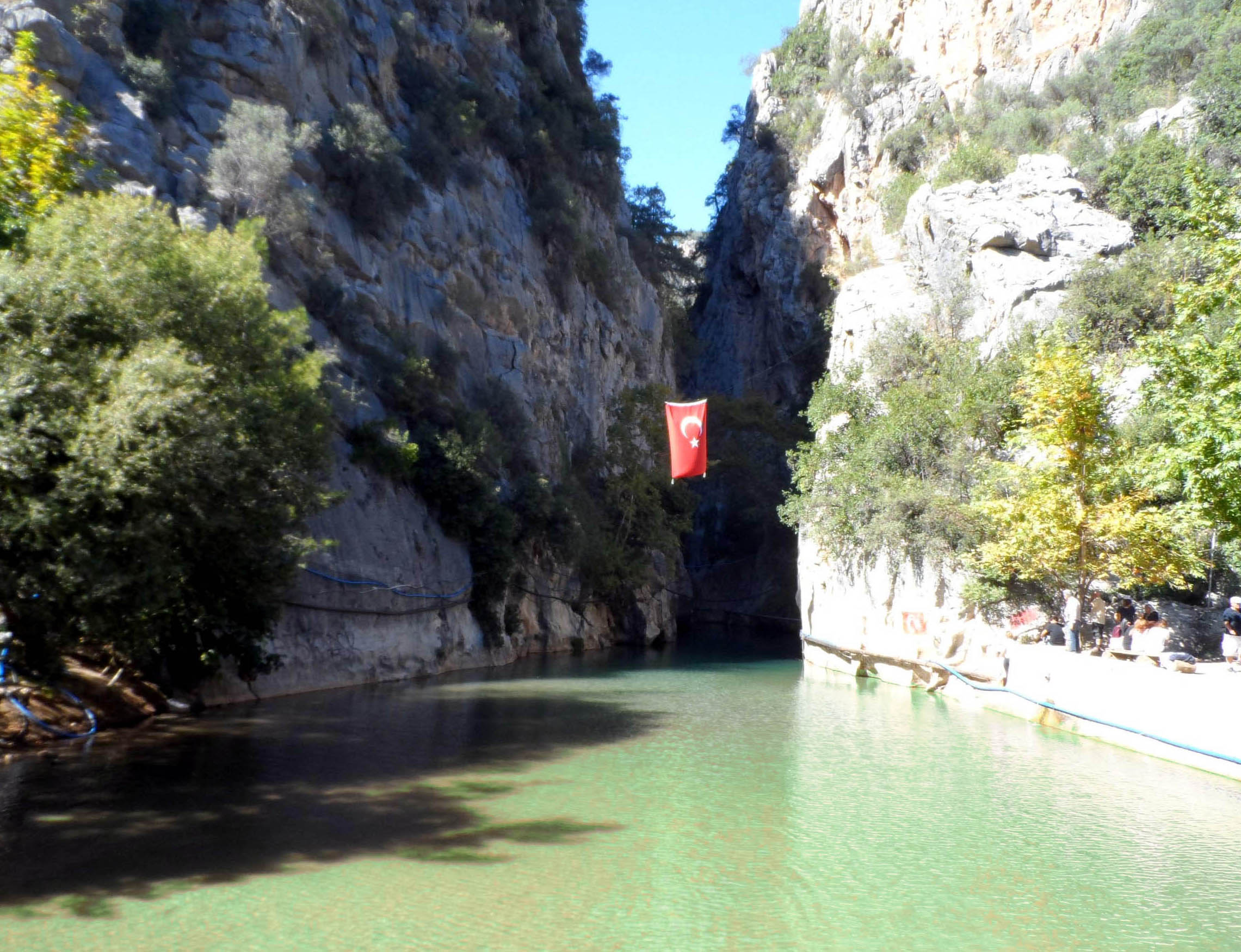
- Kisecik Canyon and its creek

- Location within Turkey
- Floor elevation: 420 m (1,380 ft)
- Long-axis direction: east–west

Geography
- Coordinates: 37°06′18″N 34°38′54″E
- Rivers: Creek
- Interactive map of Kisecik Canyon; Kisecik Kanyonu

Kisecik Canyon (Turkish: Kisecik Kanyonu), a.k.a. Saklı Cennet ("Hidden Heaven"), is a canyon in Mersin Province, Turkey.

The canyon at 37°06′18″N 34°38′54″E is located in the Toros Mountains. Administratively, it is a part of Çamlıyayla ilçe (district) of Mersin Province, at an elevation of 420 m (1,380 ft). Although it is named after the nearest village Kesecik, its shortest road is from Sarıkavak village which is about 7 kilometres (4.3 mi) to the canyon. The distance from the canyon to Çamlıyayla is 24 km (15 mi) and to Mersin is 76 km (47 mi). The canyon is locally dubbed Saklı Cennet ("Hidden Heaven").

The road between Sarıkavak and the canyon is a popular hiking course. It is stabilized only descending about 500 m (1,600 ft) downhill. Visitors reach a small pond, which is fed by a creek, a tributary of Berdan River in the canyon. The canyon is very narrow, with steep slopes. It takes about six hours to pass through the canyon by foot on a tough trail. The creek offers recreational outdoor activities like swimming and rafting.
