= Korucak =

Korucak can refer to:

- Korucak, Bayramiç
- Korucak, Çamlıyayla
