= Fakılar =

Fakılar can refer to:

- Fakılar, Alaca
- Fakılar, Çamlıyayla, a village in Turkey
- Fakılar, Devrekani, a village in Turkey
