= Sarıkoyak =

Village in Mersin Province inTurkey

- Neighbourhood
- Location in Turkey
- Coordinates: 37°05′N 34°44′E
- Country: Turkey
- Province: Mersin
- District: Çamlıyayla
- Elevation: 770 m (2,530 ft)
- Population (2022): 226
- Time zone: UTC+3 (TRT)
- Postal code: 33582
- Area code: 0324

Sarıkoyak is a neighbourhood in the municipality and district of Çamlıyayla, Mersin Province, Turkey. Its population is 226 (2022). It is situated in the Taurus Mountains. Its distance to Çamlıyayla is 25 kilometres (16 mi).
