= Belçınar =

- Neighbourhood
- Location in Turkey
- Coordinates: 37°10′N 34°40′E
- Country: Turkey
- Province: Mersin
- District: Çamlıyayla
- Elevation: 1,190 m (3,900 ft)
- Population (2022): 574
- Time zone: UTC+3 (TRT)
- Postal code: 33582
- Area code: 0324

Belçınar is a neighbourhood in the municipality and district of Çamlıyayla, Mersin Province, Turkey. Its population is 574 (2022). It is situated in the Taurus Mountains 10 kilometres (6.2 mi) east of Çamlıyayla.
