= Giden =

- Neighbourhood
- Location in Turkey
- Coordinates: 37°07′N 34°42′E
- Country: Turkey
- Province: Mersin
- District: Çamlıyayla
- Elevation: 760 m (2,490 ft)
- Population (2022): 122
- Time zone: UTC+3 (TRT)
- Postal code: 33582
- Area code: 0324

Giden is a neighbourhood in the municipality and district of Çamlıyayla, Mersin Province, Turkey. Its population is 122 (2022). It is situated in Toros Mountains 18 kilometres (11 mi) to east of Çamlıyayla.
