= Darıpınarı =

- Neighbourhood
- Location in Turkey
- Coordinates: 37°08′N 34°43′E
- Country: Turkey
- Province: Mersin
- District: Çamlıyayla
- Elevation: 710 m (2,330 ft)
- Population (2022): 671
- Time zone: UTC+3 (TRT)
- Postal code: 33582
- Area code: 0324

Darıpınarı is a neighbourhood in the municipality and district of Çamlıyayla, Mersin Province, Turkey. Its population is 671 (2022). It is situated in the Taurus Mountains 12 kilometres (7.5 mi) east of Çamlıyayla.
