= Bağçatağı =

- Neighbourhood
- Location in Turkey
- Coordinates: 37°08′N 34°44′E
- Country: Turkey
- Province: Mersin
- District: Çamlıyayla
- Elevation: 665 m (2,182 ft)
- Population (2022): 107
- Time zone: UTC+3 (TRT)
- Postal code: 33582
- Area code: 0324

Bağçatağı is a neighbourhood in the municipality and district of Çamlıyayla, Mersin Province, Turkey. Its population is 107 (2022). It is situated in the Taurus Mountains 14 kilometres (8.7 mi) east of Çamlıyayla.
