= Sebil, Mersin =

Sebil
- Neighbourhood
- Location in Turkey
- Coordinates: 37°08′N 34°34′E
- Country: Turkey
- Province: Mersin
- District: Çamlıyayla
- Elevation: 1,100 m (3,600 ft)
- Population (2022): 1,726
- Time zone: UTC+3 (TRT)
- Postal code: 33580
- Area code: 0324

Sebil is a neighbourhood in the municipality and district of Çamlıyayla, Mersin Province, Turkey. Its population is 1,726 (2022). Before the 2013 reorganisation, it was a town (belde).

== Geography ==
Sebil is a part of Çamlıyayla district which in turn is a part of Mersin Province. Distance between Sebil and Çamlıyayla is 6 km (3.7 mi). Sebil is located on southern slopes of Toros Mountains. The average altitude is about 1,100 m (3,600 ft). The country about Sebil is chiefly formed of conglomerate and limestone. Just west of the town there is a canyon, approximately 400 m (1,300 ft) deep. The canyon had been formed by the rivulet Cehennem Deresi which is a tributary of Berdan River.

== History ==
Five centuries ago the nomadic Oghuz Turks (also called Yörük) used this location as their summer camps (so called yayla). They called the location Sebil meaning free (i.e., no rent for the camp). In later years observing the winter was not harsh, eventually they chose the area as their permanent settlement. Sebil was declared a township in 1972.

== Economy ==
Sebil produces fresh fruits and vegetables. A secondary economic activity is animal husbandry. Domestic tourism in the canyon also seems promising with challenging tracking courses and game animals in the dense forest.
