= Körmenlik =

- Neighbourhood
- Location in Turkey
- Coordinates: 37°07′N 34°38′E
- Country: Turkey
- Province: Mersin
- District: Çamlıyayla
- Elevation: 830 m (2,720 ft)
- Population (2022): 254
- Time zone: UTC+3 (TRT)
- Postal code: 33582
- Area code: 0324

Körmenlik is a neighbourhood in the municipality and district of Çamlıyayla, Mersin Province, Turkey. Its population is 254 (2022). It is situated in the Taurus Mountains. Its distance to Çamlıyayla is 8 kilometres (5.0 mi).
