= Sarıkavak, Çamlıyayla =

Sarıkavak
- Neighbourhood
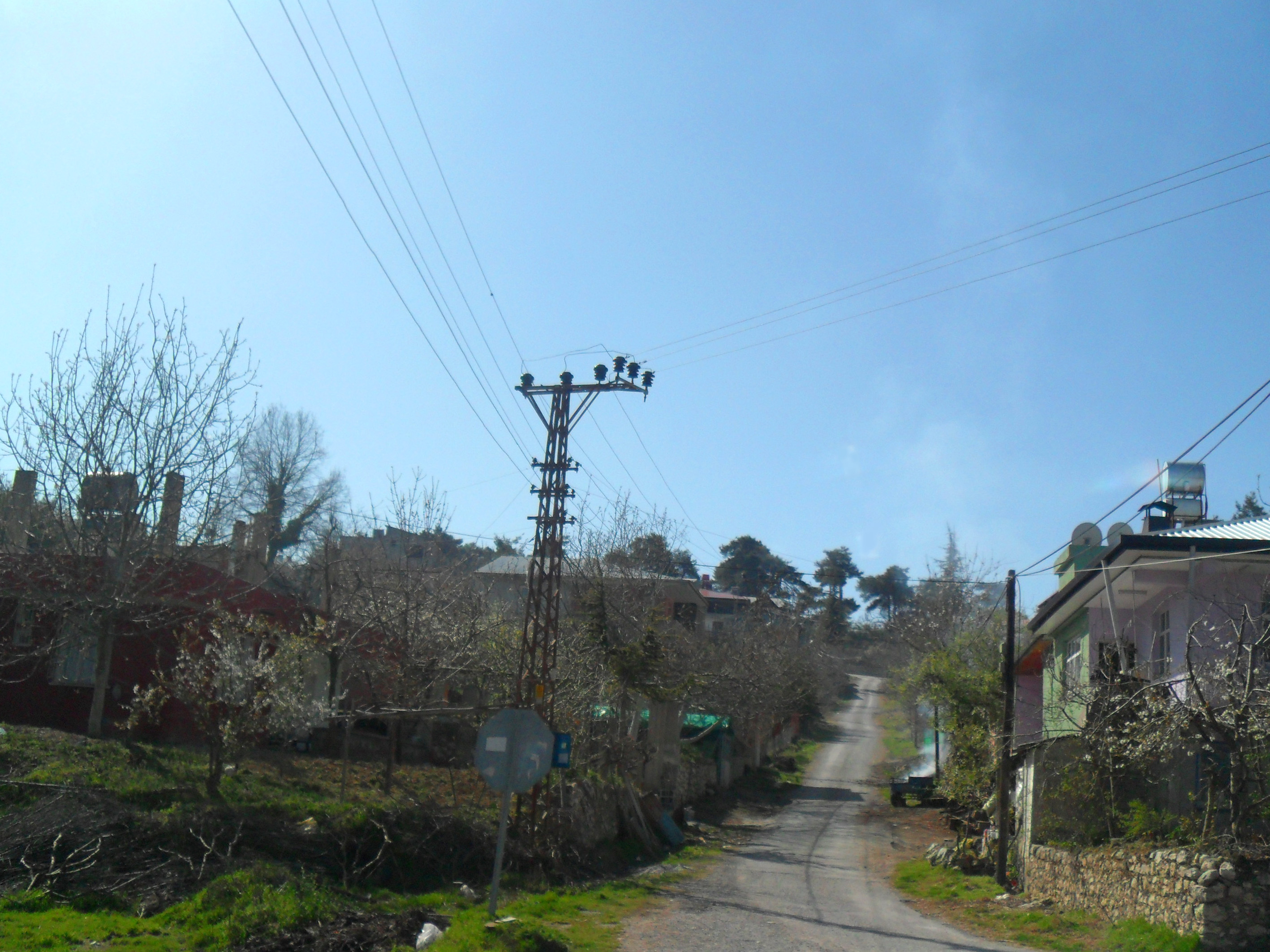

- Location within Turkey
- Coordinates: 37°06′N 34°41′E
- Country: Turkey
- Province: Mersin
- District: Çamlıyayla
- Elevation: 850 m (2,790 ft)
- Population (2022): 677
- Time zone: UTC+3 (TRT)
- Postal code: 33582
- Area code: 0324

Sarıkavak is a neighbourhood in the municipality and district of Çamlıyayla, Mersin Province, Turkey. As of 2022, its population was 677 (2022). It is on the road connecting Çamlıyayla to Tarsus and Mersin. Distance to Çamlıyayla is 17 kilometres (11 mi) to Tarsus is 40 kilometres (25 mi) and to Mersin is 69 kilometres (43 mi). The popular hiking course and the canyon Kisecik Canyon is to the west of the village. Sarıkavak is a typical agricultural village where vegetables and olives are the main crops. Some residents also work in cotton fields around Tarsus, Mersin, and Adana.
