= Kesecik, Çamlıyayla =

Kesecik
- Neighbourhood
- Location in Turkey
- Coordinates: 37°06′N 34°38′E
- Country: Turkey
- Province: Mersin
- District: Çamlıyayla
- Elevation: 720 m (2,360 ft)
- Population (2022): 204
- Time zone: UTC+3 (TRT)
- Postal code: 33582
- Area code: 0324

Kesecik is a neighbourhood in the Çamlıyayla district of Mersin Province, Turkey. Its population is 204 (2022). It is situated in the Taurus Mountains 18 kilometres (11 mi) to east of Çamlıyayla.
