= Korucak, Çamlıyayla =

Korucak
- Neighbourhood
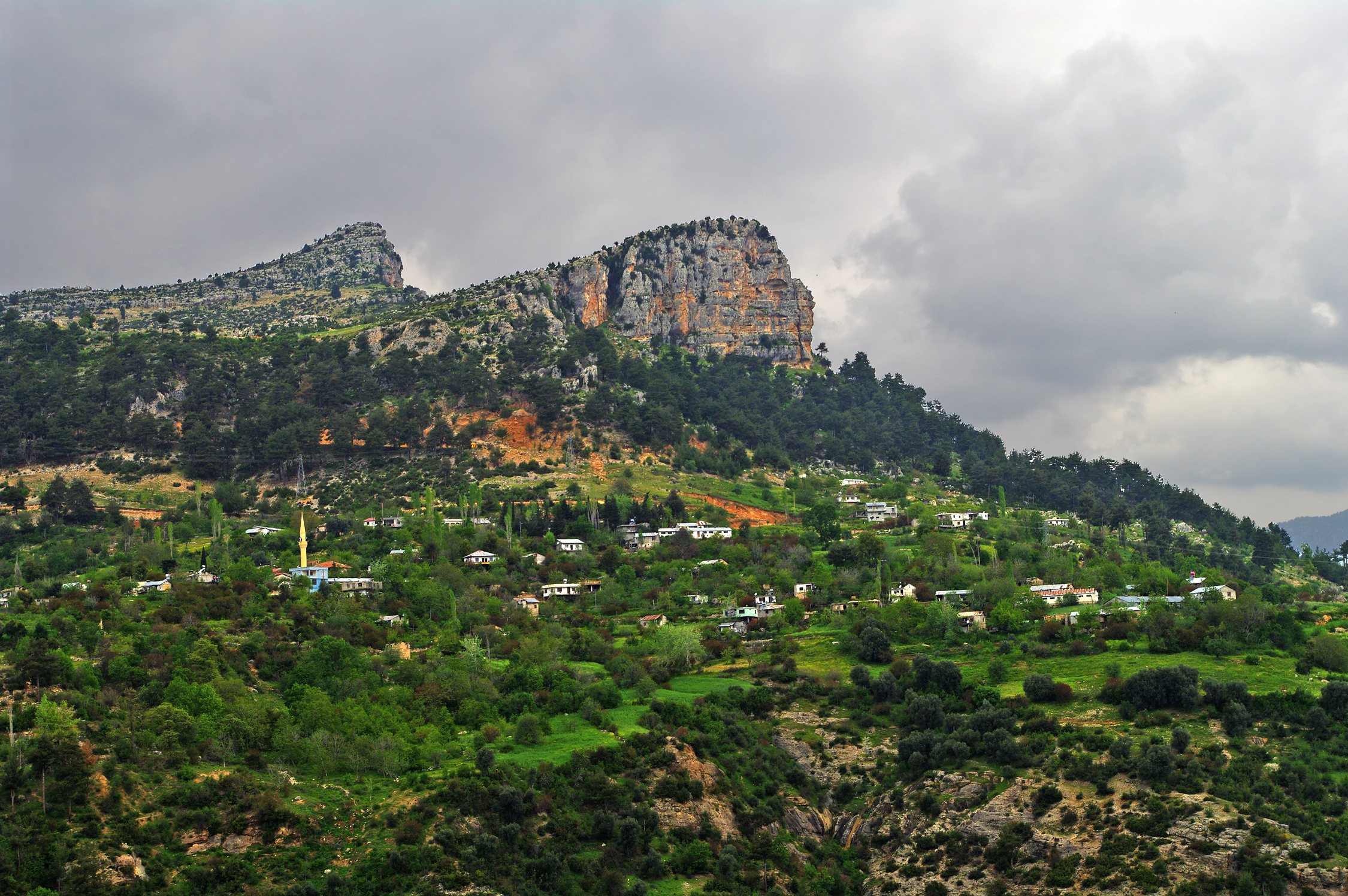

- Location within Turkey
- Coordinates: 37°09′N 34°43′E
- Country: Turkey
- Province: Mersin
- District: Çamlıyayla
- Elevation: 730 m (2,400 ft)
- Population (2022): 238
- Time zone: UTC+3 (TRT)
- Postal code: 33582
- Area code: 0324

Korucak is a neighbourhood in the municipality and district of Çamlıyayla, Mersin Province, Turkey. Its population is 238 (2022). It is situated in the Taurus Mountains, 18 kilometres (11 mi) to east of Çamlıyayla.
