= Çamlıyayla =

- District and municipality
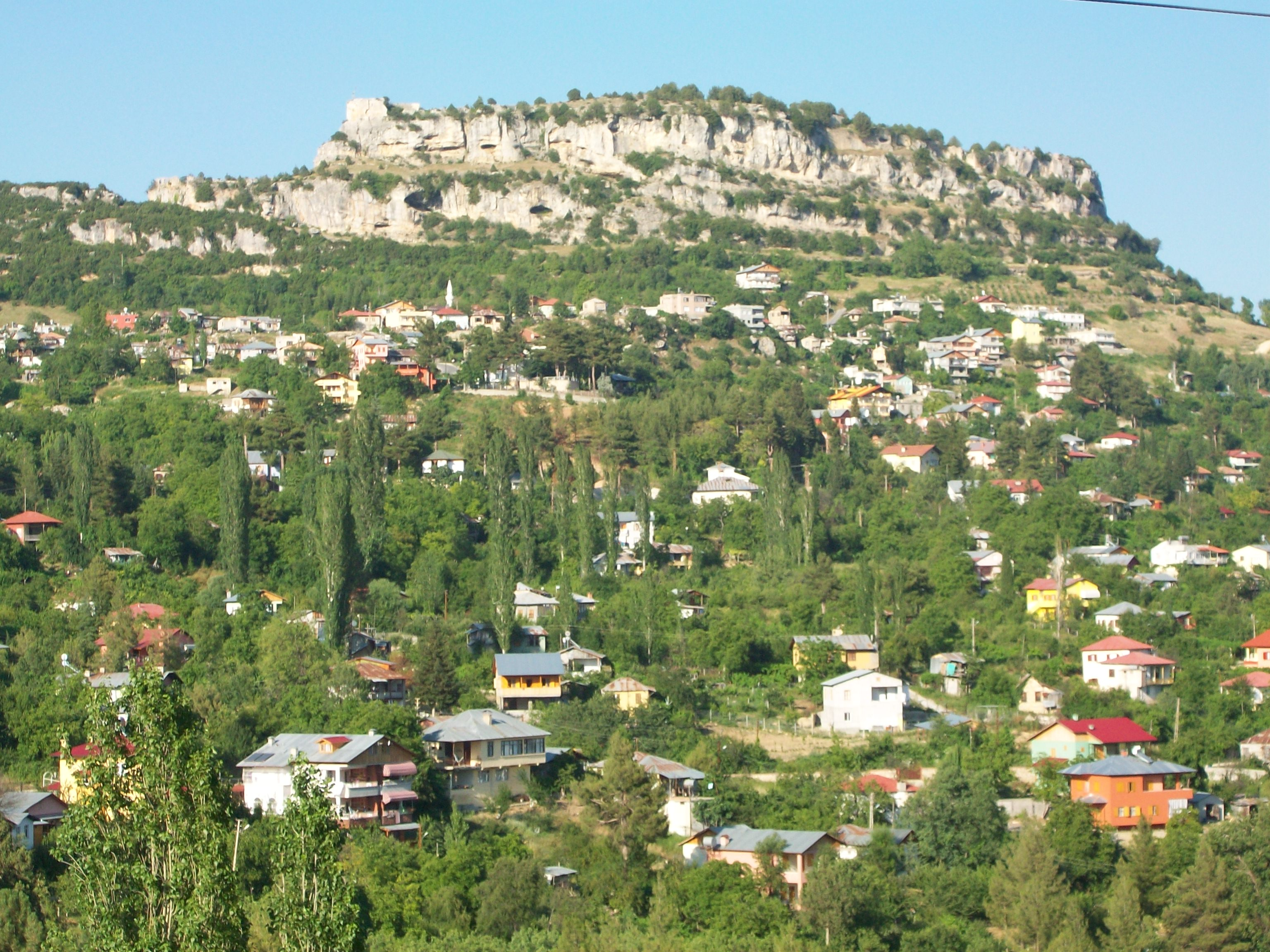
- Çamlıyayla and Namrun Castle

- Map showing Çamlıyayla District in Mersin Province

- Location within Turkey
- Coordinates: 37°10′13″N 34°36′30″E
- Country: Turkey
- Province: Mersin

Government
  - Mayor: Mehmet Fatih Sofu (İYİ)
- Area: 602 km^{2} (232 sq mi)
- Population (2022): 8,164
  - Density: 13.6/km^{2} (35.1/sq mi)
- Time zone: UTC+3 (TRT)
- Postal code: 33580
- Area code: 0324
- Website: www.camliyayla.bel.tr

Çamlıyayla is a municipality and district of Mersin Province, Turkey. Its area is 602 km^{2}, and its population is 8,164 (2022).

Çamlıyayla is a small district high in the Taurus Mountains. In summer the lakes, streams and pine forests of Çamlıyayla attract many visitors, people from Adana, Mersin and Tarsus escaping from the extreme heat on the coast to summer homes up in the hills (see yayla).

Çamlıyayla is a quiet rural area without the wild nightlife to entertain young people and is therefore popular with families and the retired, typically children stay in the hills with their grandparents while their parents are at work in the city; in the school holiday period the population of the district rises to over 100,000. The cuisine includes a slushed ice called karsambaç, the ancestor of ice cream, very refreshing in summer.

There is a mountain goat breeding centre in Çamlıyayla and people go there to hunt for wild boar, rabbits and sandgrouse. At higher altitudes, the district is bare mountainside, above the tree line.

== History ==
The early history of the area is unknown but these hills must have been occupied from the earliest times. By the late 11th century, the area was briefly controlled by the Byzantine empire, but was briefly conquered by the Seljuk Turks in 1081. Near the edge of the town is the sprawling Hetʽumid castle of Lampron, an Armenian construction of the 11th and 12th centuries, which has a few structural remains from the earlier late antique and Byzantine periods. The residential chambers at the northwest are especially impressive with their well-cut ashlar masonry. This site guarded a strategic route from Cappadocia to the Armenian Kingdom of Cilicia. Subsequently, the castle was brought into the Ottoman Empire and was the scene of fighting between the Ottomans and the Mamluks.

== Composition ==
There are 14 neighbourhoods in Çamlıyayla District:

- Bağçatağı
- Belçınar
- Çayırekinliği
- Cumayakası
- Darıpınarı
- Fakılar
- Giden
- Kale
- Kesecik
- Körmenlik
- Korucak
- Sarıkavak
- Sarıkoyak
- Sebil
