= Fakılar, Çamlıyayla =

Fakılar
- Neighbourhood
- Location in Turkey
- Coordinates: 37°11′N 34°40′E
- Country: Turkey
- Province: Mersin
- District: Çamlıyayla
- Elevation: 970 m (3,180 ft)
- Population (2022): 771
- Time zone: UTC+3 (TRT)
- Postal code: 33582
- Area code: 0324

Fakılar is a neighbourhood in the municipality and district of Çamlıyayla, Mersin Province, Turkey. Its population is 771 (2022). It is situated in the Taurus Mountains. The distance between Fakılar and Çamlıyayla is 7 km (4.3 mi). The main crops of Fakılar are cherry and hickory nut.
