= Mersin Province =

Province of Turkey

Coordinates: 36°40′43″N 33°48′19″E

Mersin Province Mersin ili
- Province and metropolitan municipality
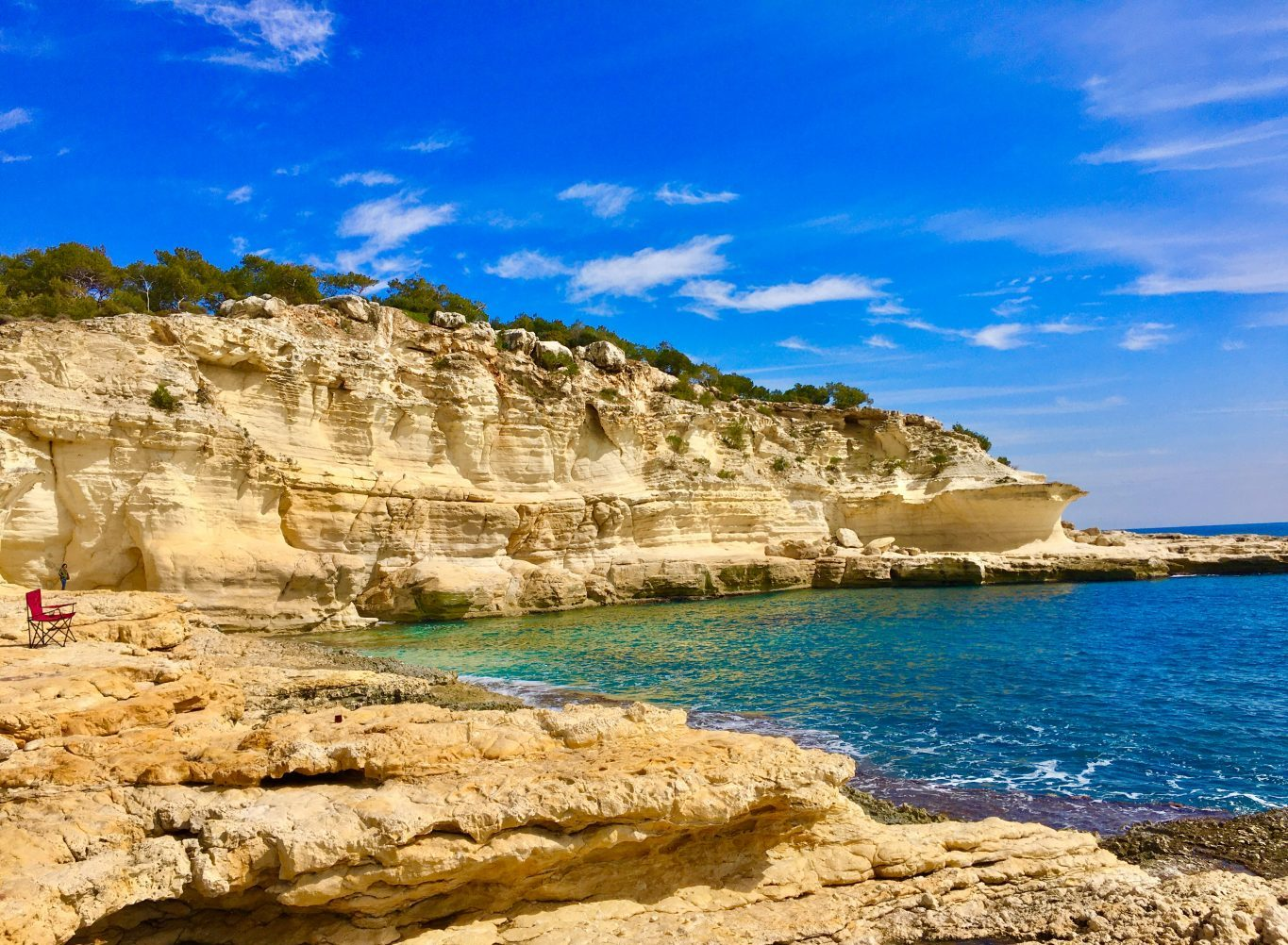
- Mersin coastline

- Location of the province within Turkey
- Country: Turkey
- Seat: Mersin

Government
  - Mayor: Vahap Seçer (CHP)
  - Vali: Attila Toros
- Area: 16,010 km^{2} (6,180 sq mi)
- Population (2022): 1,916,432
  - Density: 119.7/km^{2} (310.0/sq mi)
- Time zone: UTC+3 (TRT)
- Area code: 0324
- Website: www.mersin.bel.tr www.mersin.gov.tr

Mersin Province (Turkish: Mersin ili), formerly İçel Province (İçel ili), is a province and metropolitan municipality in southern Turkey, on the Mediterranean coast between Antalya and Adana. Its area is 16,010 km^{2}, and its population is 1,916,432 (2022). The provincial capital and the biggest city in the province is Mersin, which is composed of four municipalities and district governorates: Akdeniz, Mezitli, Toroslar and Yenişehir. Next largest is Tarsus, the birthplace of Paul the Apostle. The province is considered to be a part of the geographical, economical and cultural region of Çukurova, which covers the provinces of Mersin, Adana, Osmaniye and Hatay.

== Etymology ==
The province is named after its biggest city Mersin. Mersin was named after the aromatic plant genus Myrsine (Greek: Μυρσίνη, Turkish: mersin) in the family Primulaceae, a myrtle that grows in abundance in the area. The 17th-century Ottoman traveler Evliya Çelebi has recorded in his Seyahatnâme that there was also a clan named Mersinoğulları in the area.

== Geography ==
Köppen map of Mersin Province and surrounding regions:
- Csa
- Csb
- Dsa
- Dsb
- Dsc

Ninth biggest province of Turkey by land area, Mersin consists 2,02% of Turkey. 87% of the land area is mountain, leading up to the rocky heights of the central Taurus Mountains, the highest peak is Medetsiz (3,584 m) in the Bolkar range, and there are a number of important passes over to central Anatolia. There are many high meadows and small plains between 700 and 1500m.

The coastal strip has many large areas of flatland, formed from soil brought down by rivers and streams running off the mountains. This is fertile land, the largest area being the plain of Tarsus. The largest rivers are the Göksu and the Berdan (Göksu Calycadnus and Berdan Cydnus of antiquity), but there are many small streams running into lakes, reservoirs or the Mediterranean sea. Mersin has 321 km of coastline, much of it sandy beach. The climate is typical of the Mediterranean; very hot and rainless in summer, mild and wet in winter. The winter rains can be very heavy and flooding is a problem in many areas, but it never snows on the coast, only in the mountainous areas.

Mersin

Climate chart (precipitation, max. and min. temperature)
J	F	M	A	M	J	J	A	S	O	N	D
116 15 8	79 16 8	56 19 11	35 22 14	27 26 19	12 29 23	9.3 32 26	7.3 33 26	13 31 23	36 28 19	80 22 13	163 17 9
- █ Average max. and min. temperatures in °C
- █ Precipitation totals in mm
Imperial conversion
J	F	M	A	M	J	J	A	S	O	N	D
4.6 59 46	3.1 61 47	2.2 66 52	1.4 72 58	1.1 78 65	0.5 84 73	0.4 89 78	0.3 91 79	0.5 88 74	1.4 82 65	3.2 72 55	6.4 62 48
- █ Average max. and min. temperatures in °F
- █ Precipitation totals in inches

Erdemli

Climate chart (precipitation, max. and min. temperature)
J	F	M	A	M	J	J	A	S	O	N	D
107 15 5	78 16 6	54 19 8	38 22 11	23 26 15	7.5 29 20	2 32 23	2.7 32 24	8.4 31 20	35 28 15	72 22 10	141 17 7
- █ Average max. and min. temperatures in °C
- █ Precipitation totals in mm
Imperial conversion
J	F	M	A	M	J	J	A	S	O	N	D
4.2 59 41	3.1 61 42	2.1 66 46	1.5 72 52	0.9 78 60	0.3 84 68	0.1 89 74	0.1 90 75	0.3 87 68	1.4 82 59	2.8 71 50	5.6 62 44
- █ Average max. and min. temperatures in °F
- █ Precipitation totals in inches

Mut

Climate chart (precipitation, max. and min. temperature)
J	F	M	A	M	J	J	A	S	O	N	D
68 11 3	51 13 4	35 18 7	22 23 11	26 29 16	12 34 21	0.9 37 24	2.7 37 24	5.5 33 20	20 27 15	43 19 9	76 13 5
- █ Average max. and min. temperatures in °C
- █ Precipitation totals in mm
Imperial conversion
J	F	M	A	M	J	J	A	S	O	N	D
2.7 52 38	2 56 40	1.4 64 45	0.9 73 52	1 83 60	0.5 93 69	0 99 75	0.1 99 75	0.2 92 68	0.8 80 58	1.7 65 47	3 55 40
- █ Average max. and min. temperatures in °F
- █ Precipitation totals in inches

Anamur

Climate chart (precipitation, max. and min. temperature)
J	F	M	A	M	J	J	A	S	O	N	D
192 16 9	136 16 9	82 19 10	46 22 13	28 26 17	3.5 30 21	0.8 33 24	1.2 34 25	13 31 22	56 28 18	135 22 14	209 18 10
- █ Average max. and min. temperatures in °C
- █ Precipitation totals in mm
Imperial conversion
J	F	M	A	M	J	J	A	S	O	N	D
7.6 61 47	5.3 62 47	3.2 66 51	1.8 71 55	1.1 78 62	0.1 86 69	0 92 75	0 93 76	0.5 89 71	2.2 82 65	5.3 72 57	8.2 64 50
- █ Average max. and min. temperatures in °F
- █ Precipitation totals in inches

== History ==
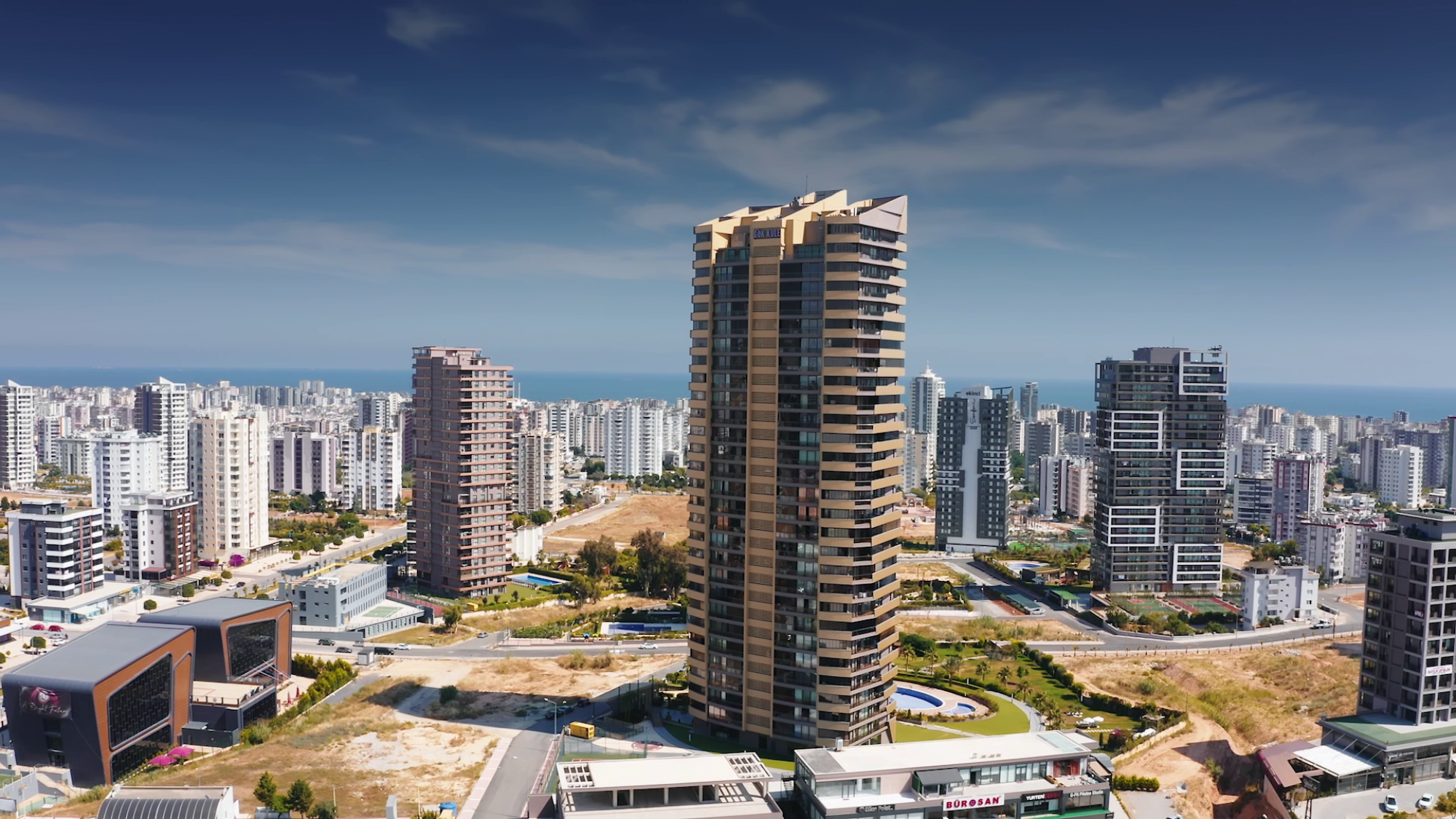
Mersin from the sky

In antiquity, this coast was part of Cilicia, named for a Phoenician or Assyrian prince that had settled here. Trade from Syria and Mesopotamia over the mountains to central Anatolia passed through here, through the Cilician Gates. The geographer Strabo, described the region as being divided into "Rugged Cilicia" (Cilicia Trachea, Κιλικία Τραχεία in Greek) and "Flat Cilicia" (Cilicia Pedias, Κιλικία Πεδιάς). The capital of both sections of Cilicia was Tarsus and Mersin was its seaport. The Seljuks later captured it from the Byzantines and it then came under the Crusaders then the Seljuks again and finally the Ottomans captured it and it remained part of the Ottoman Empire until 1922.

== Administration ==
The province of Mersin until 1933 didn't include the western territories of the modern province, which then constituted the separate İçel province, with Silifke as its administrative center. In 1933, the provinces of Mersin and İçel were merged. The new province was named "İçel" and the city of Mersin was made its capital. The province was renamed to "Mersin" on 28 June 2002.

=== Districts ===
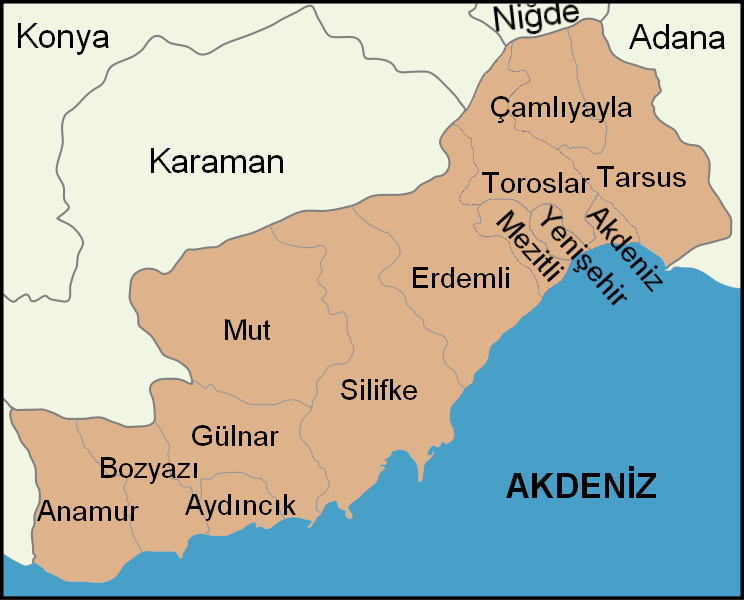

Mersin province is divided into thirteen districts four of which are actually included within the municipality of Mersin city (shown in boldface letters).

- **Akdeniz**
- Anamur
- Aydıncık
- Bozyazı
- Çamlıyayla
- Erdemli
- Gülnar
- **Mezitli**
- Mut
- Silifke
- Tarsus
- **Toroslar**
- **Yenişehir**

== Demographics ==
Historical population
Year	Pop.	±% p.a.
1927	211,543	—
1935	244,236	+1.81%
1940	257,709	+1.08%
1950	317,929	+2.12%
1960	444,523	+3.41%
1970	590,943	+2.89%
1980	843,931	+3.63%
1990	1,266,995	+4.15%
2000	1,651,400	+2.69%
2010	1,647,899	−0.02%
2020	1,868,757	+1.27%
Source:Turkstat

About 50% of the population of the province is younger than 24 years of age. 68% were born in Mersin. The literacy rate is 89%. About 43% of the male population and about 27% of the female population graduated from middle school. Infant mortality is 0.48%. Urban population growth rate is 2.42%. Population density is 117 as of November 2020.(In the table below, the four second-level municipalities are merged within Mersin proper.)

Name of the district	Population (urban area)	Population (district total, including rural area)
Mersin	842,230	888,803
Anamur	34,227	62,702
Aydıncık	8,004	11,651
Bozyazı	15,615	26,295
Çamlıyayla	2,861	9,847
Erdemli	45,241	125,391
Gülnar	8,357	19,141
Mut	28,966	63,673
Silifke	51,684	113,404
Tarsus	233,436	308,681

== Economy ==
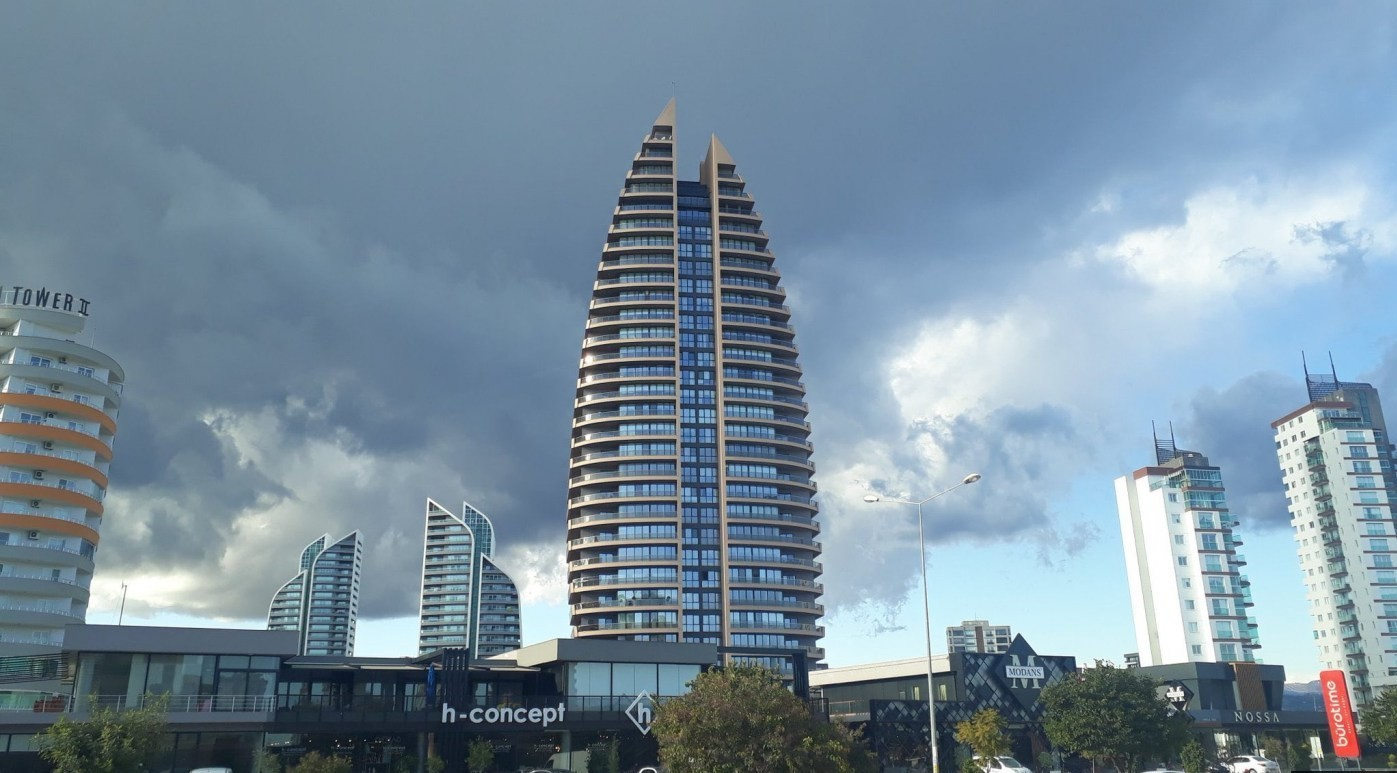
Mersin skyline

The city of Mersin is one of busiest cities in Turkey. Due to the economic activity in this part of Turkey generated by the GAP Project Mersin is Turkey's biggest Mediterranean port, and also hosts an oil refinery and a free trade zone; there are a number of factories along the road between Mersin and Adana, manufacturing glass, detergents, fertilizers and many more. With all this activity a modern city has grown with a university and other major amenities.

=== Tourism ===
Mersin does not have the huge volume of tourists enjoyed by neighbouring Antalya or the Aegean coast, but Turkish people do come to this coast, especially now that the hotels have air-conditioning, and perhaps more to the mountain country behind where there are healing mineral water springs. In summer the hills are a popular retreat from the high humidity and extreme heat on the coast. West of Mersin includes bays, and little islands. Yacht touring is a tourism income in these areas.

== Places of interest ==
- The city of Tarsus, birthplace of St Paul, whose house and well are sites of Christian pilgrimage.
- Alahan Monastery
- Silifke - ancient Seleucia in Isauria, buildings include the church of Aya Tekla, the first female saint.
- The ancient Roman town of Soloi-Pompeiopolis, now within the city. About Mersin
- The ancient Roman town of Anemurium, adjacent to the modern town of Anamur.
- Another ancient city of Elaiussa Sebaste, 55 km from the city of Mersin.
- Castles including Mamure, Kızkalesi and Namrun.
- Yerköprü Waterfall
- Mersin Naval Museum

== Towns and other geographic features ==
=== Towns ===
- Arslanköy
- Ayvagediği
- Büyükeceli
- Çarıklar
- Çeşmeli
- Göksu
- Gözne
- Gülek
- Fındıkpınarı
- Kargıpınarı
- Kızkalesi
- Kocahasanlı
- Köseçobanlı
- Kuskan
- Limonlu
- Narlıkuyu
- Ören
- Sebil
- Taşucu
- Tekeli
- Tekmen
- Uzuncaburç
- Yenice
- Yeşilovacık
- Yeşiltepe
- Zeyne

=== Archaeological and historical ===
- Adamkayalar
- Alahan Monastery
- Altından geçme
- Akhayat sinkhole
- Aya Tekla Church
- Baç Bridge
- Bilal Habeşi Masjid
- Canbazlı ruins
- Caracalla's inscription
- Cennet and Cehennem
- Cleopatra's gate
- Corycus
- Çanakçı rock tombs
- Dörtayak
- Gözlükule
- Kanlıdivane
- Karakabaklı
- Kırkkaşık Bedesten
- Laal Pasha Mosque
- Lamas Aqueduct
- Mancınık Castle
- Mamure Castle
- Meydancık Castle
- Mezgitkale
- Mut Castle
- Olba (ancient city)
- Öküzlü ruins
- Paşa Türbesi
- Roman road in Cilicia
- Saint Paul's Church, Tarsus
- Silifke Castle
- Sinekkale
- Soli, Cilicia
- Tapureli ruins
- Tarsus Grand Mosque
- Taşgeçit Bridge
- Tekir ambarı
- Üçayaklı ruins
- Veyselli rock reliefs
- Yanıkhan
- Yumuktepe

=== Museums ===
- Anamur Museum
- Mersin Museum
- Mersin Atatürk Museum
- Mersin Naval Museum
- Mersin Urban History Museum
- Mersin Water Museum
- Narlıkuyu Museum
- Silifke Museum
- Silifke Atatürk Museum
- Tarsus Museum

=== Other ===
- 2013 Mediterranean Games
- Berdan River
- Cyprus Memorial Cemetery in Silifke
- Çukurova
- Dana Adası
- Gulf of Mersin
- Karabucak Forest
- Karakız Lake
- List of municipalities in Mersin Province
- List of populated places in Mersin Province
- Mersin Congress and Exhibition Center
- Mersin Grand Mosque
- Mersin Harbor
- Mezitli River
- Muğdat Mosque
- Müftü River
- Tourism centers of Mersin Province
- Transport in Mersin Province
- Yenice Conference (Yenice Görüşmesi )

=== Gallery ===
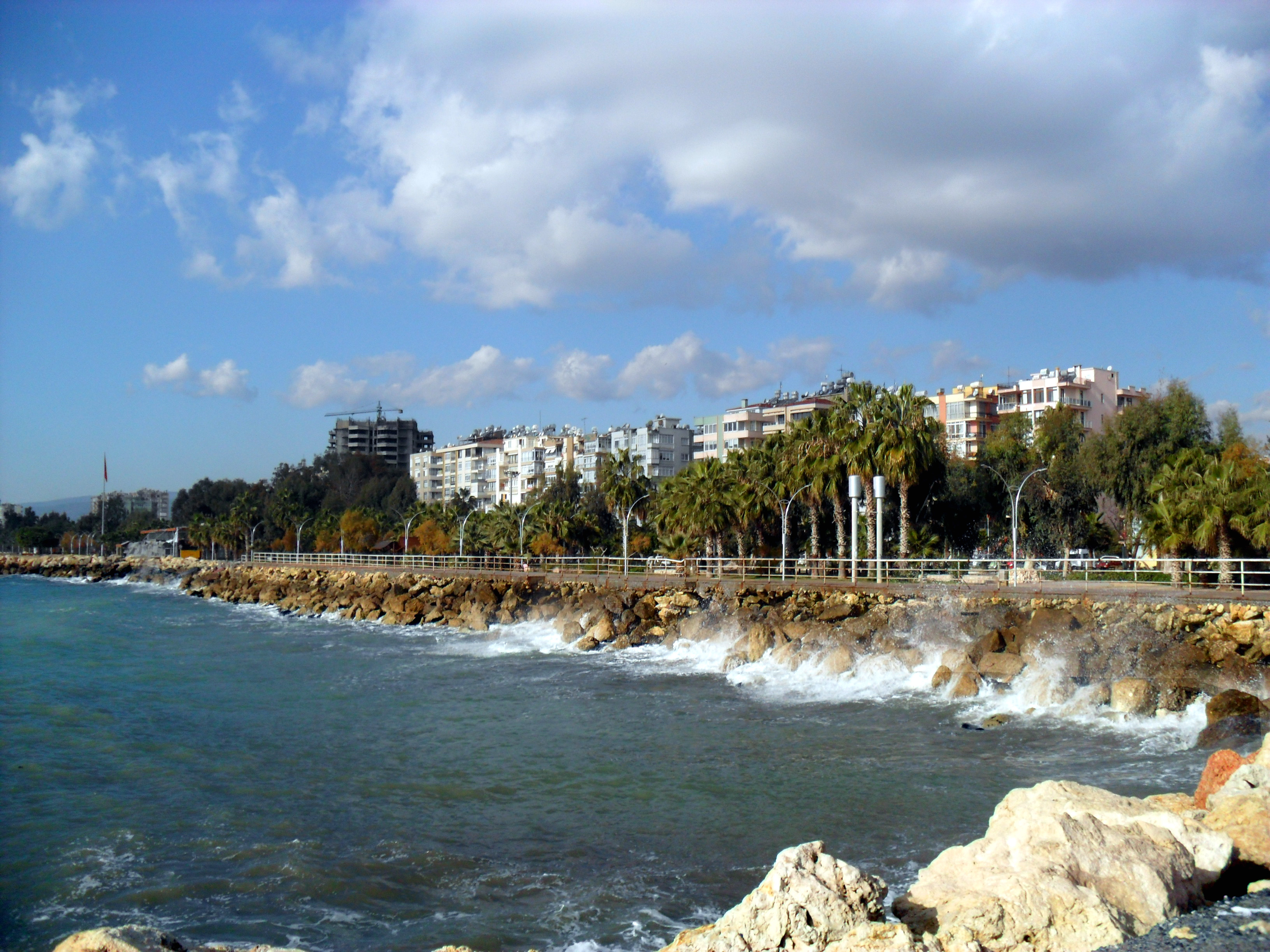
Mersin
Mediterranean sea shore

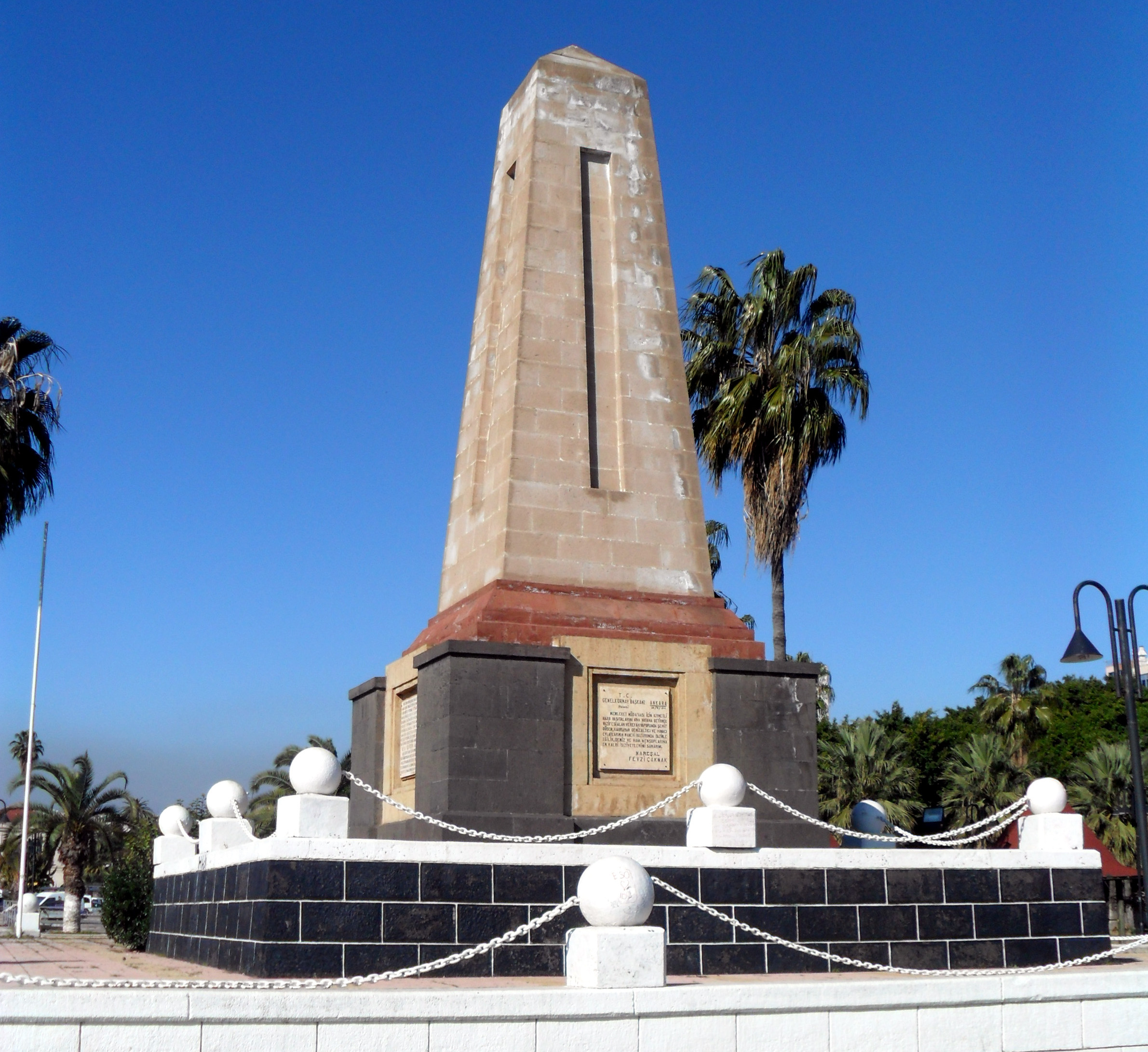
Mersin
Refah monument

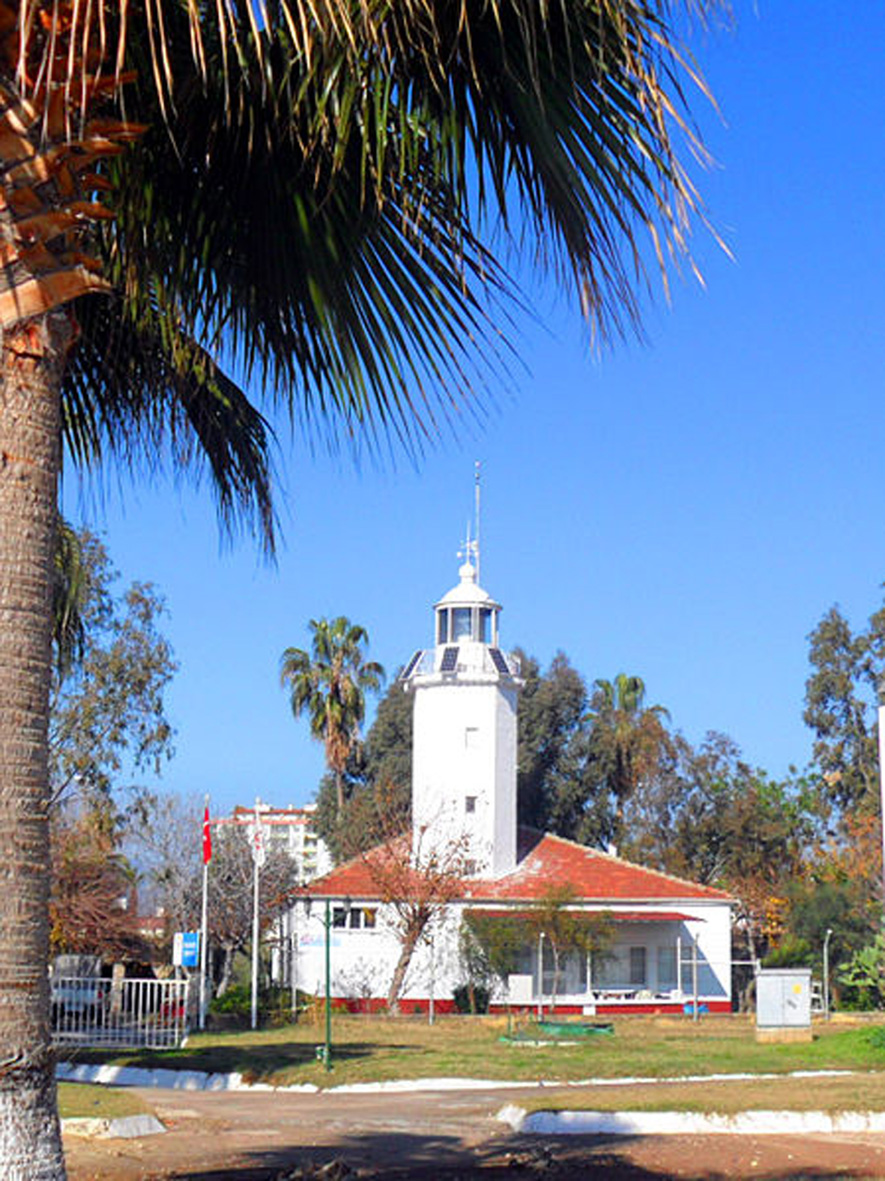
Mersin
Light house

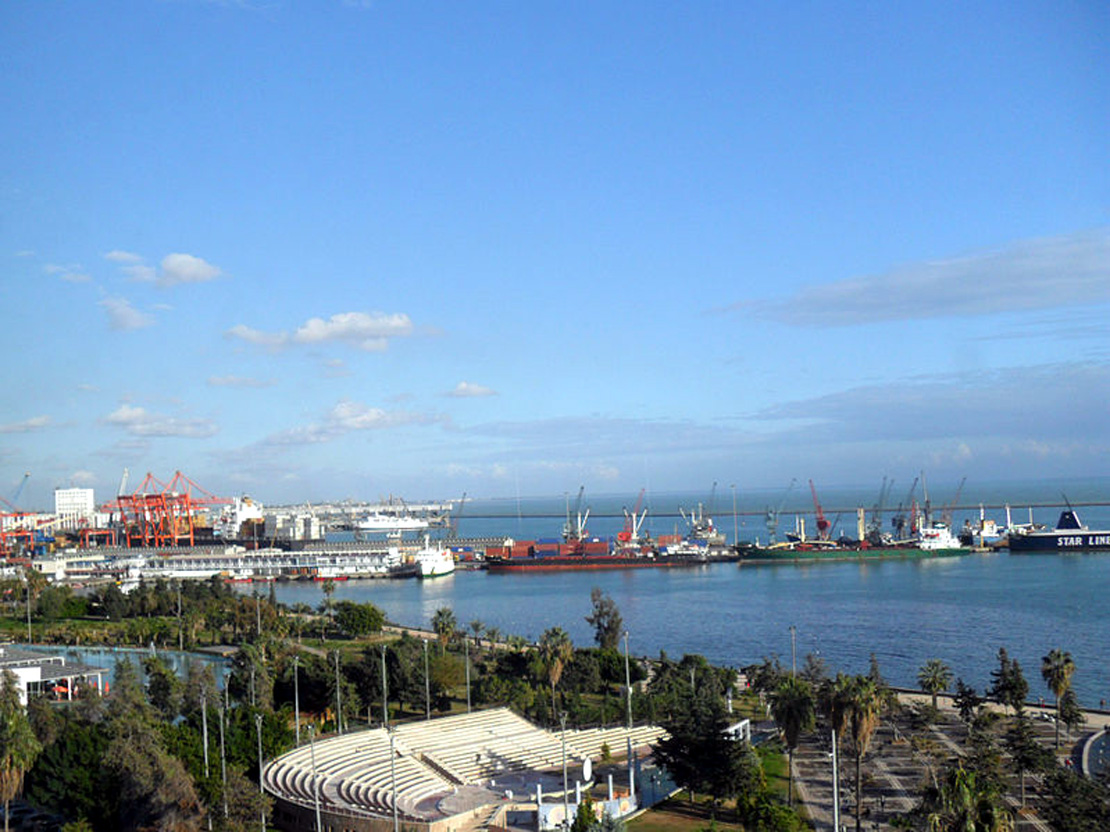
Mersin
Harbor

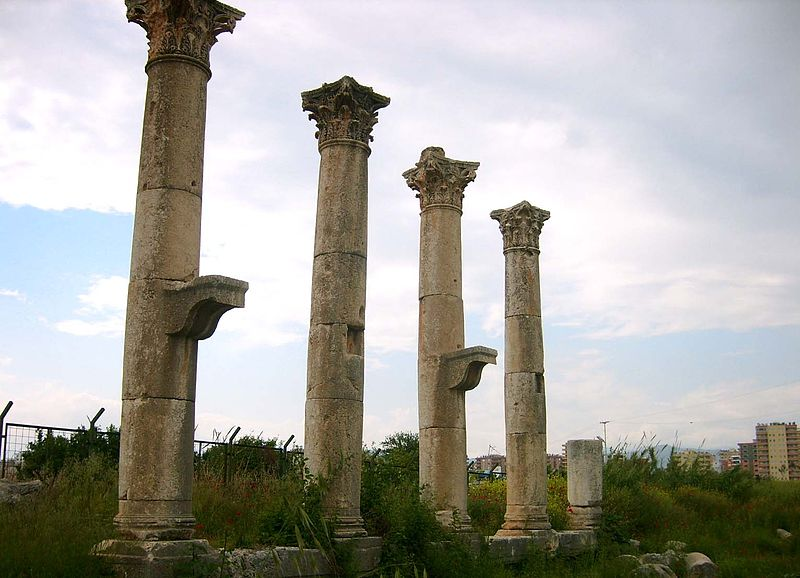
Mersin
Soli ruins

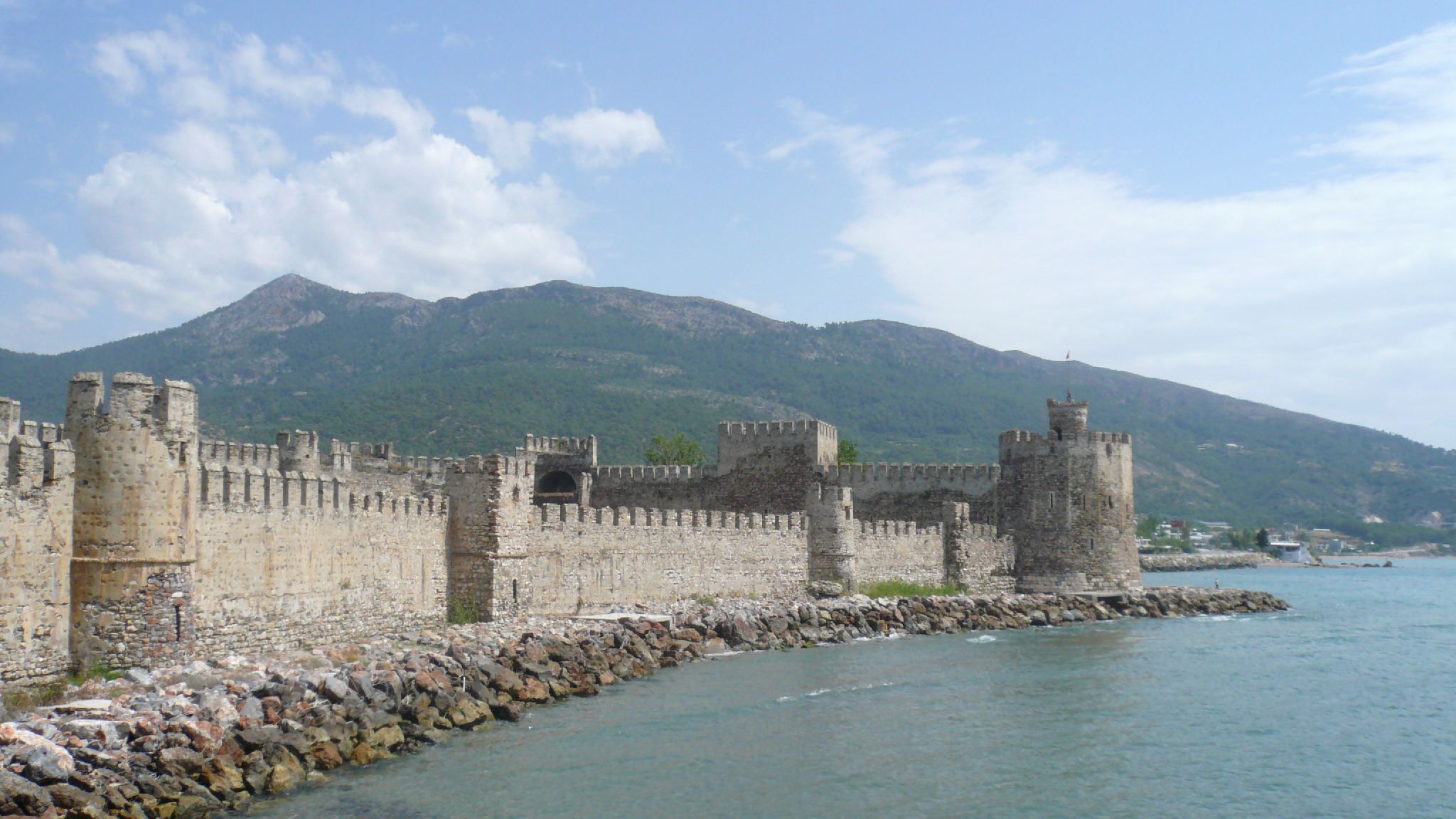
Anamur
Mamure castle

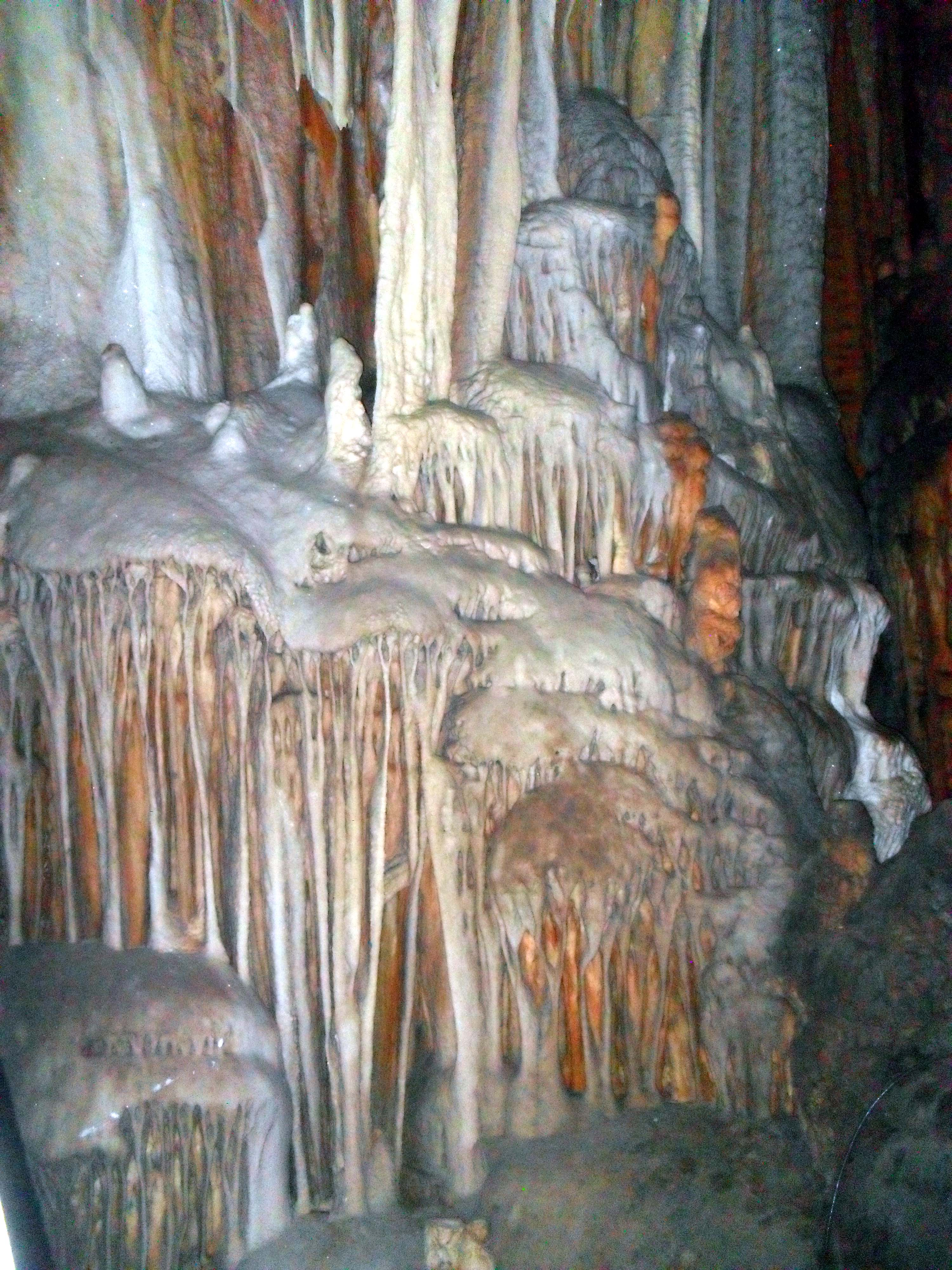
Aydıncık
Aynalıgöl

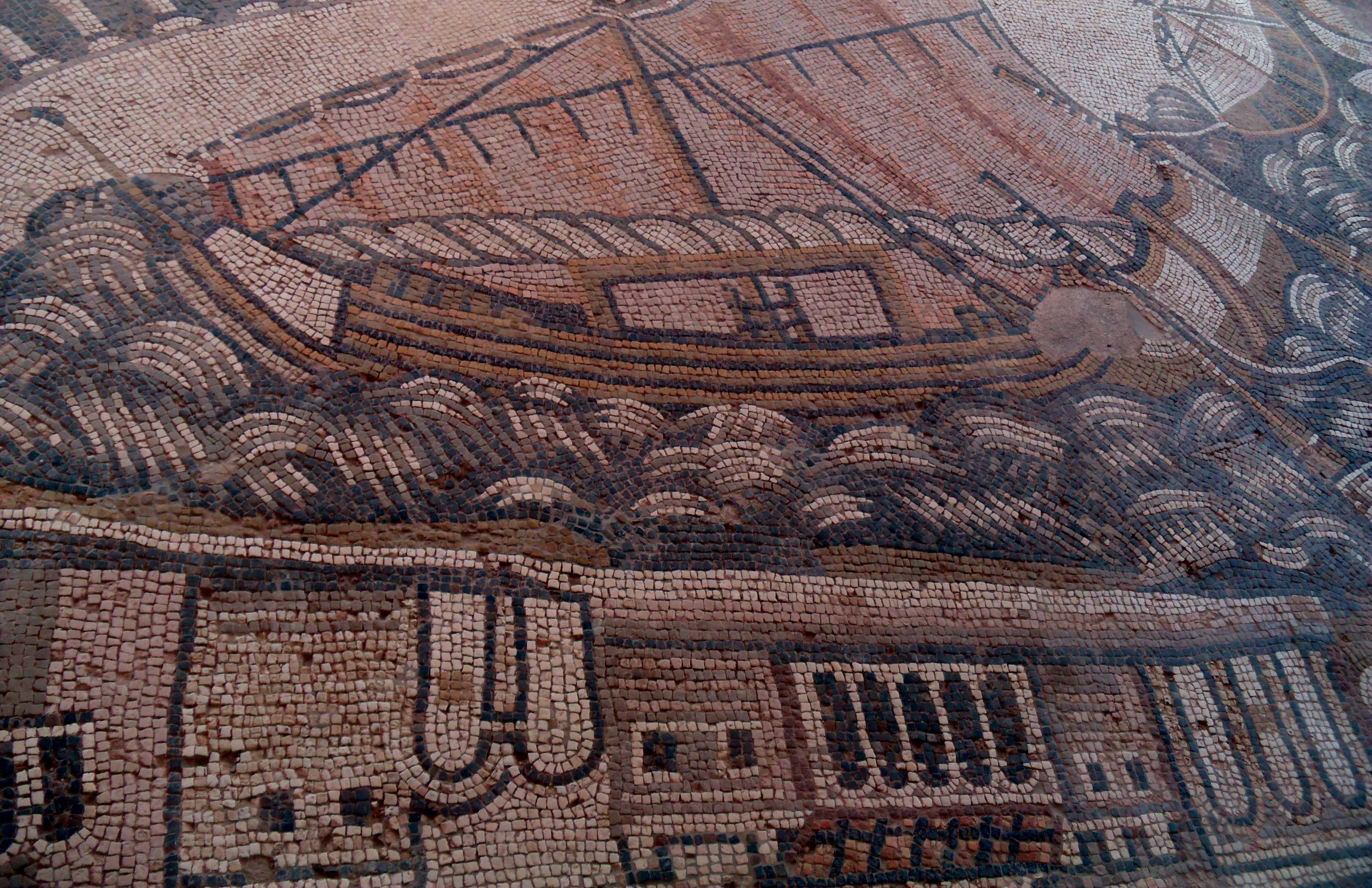
Aydıncık
Detail from the mosaic

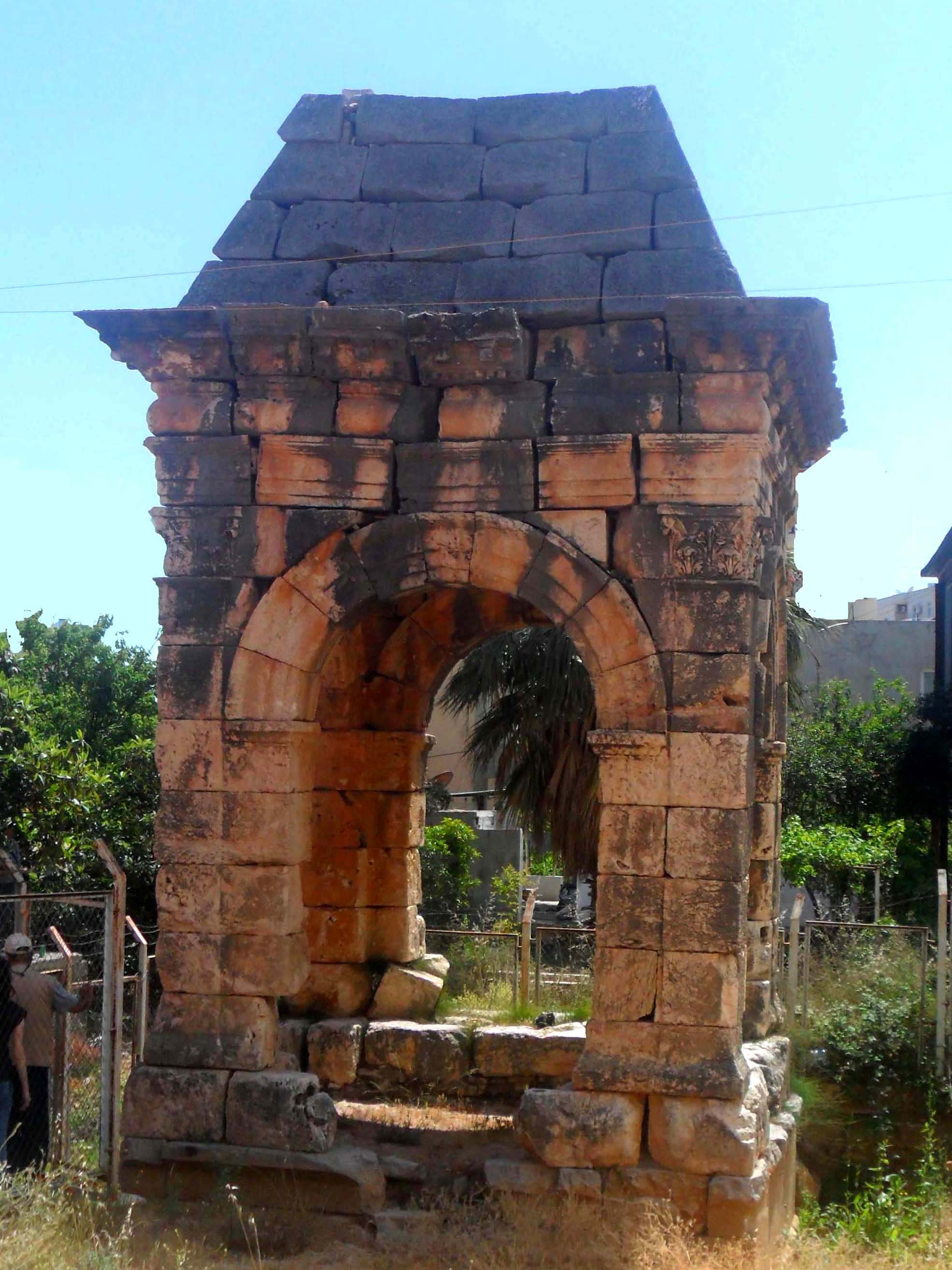
Aydıncık
Dörtayak

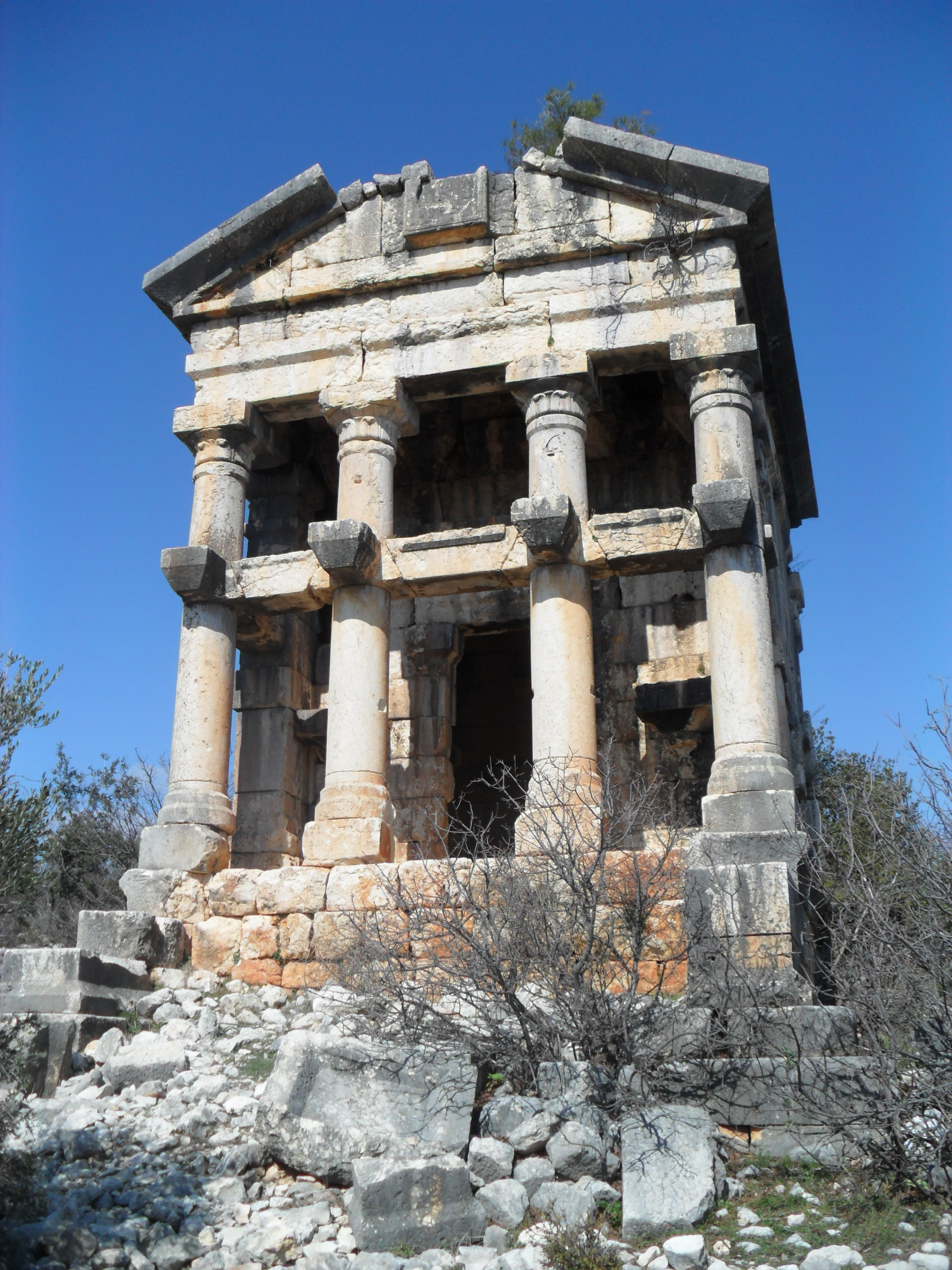
Mezgitkale, Mersin Province

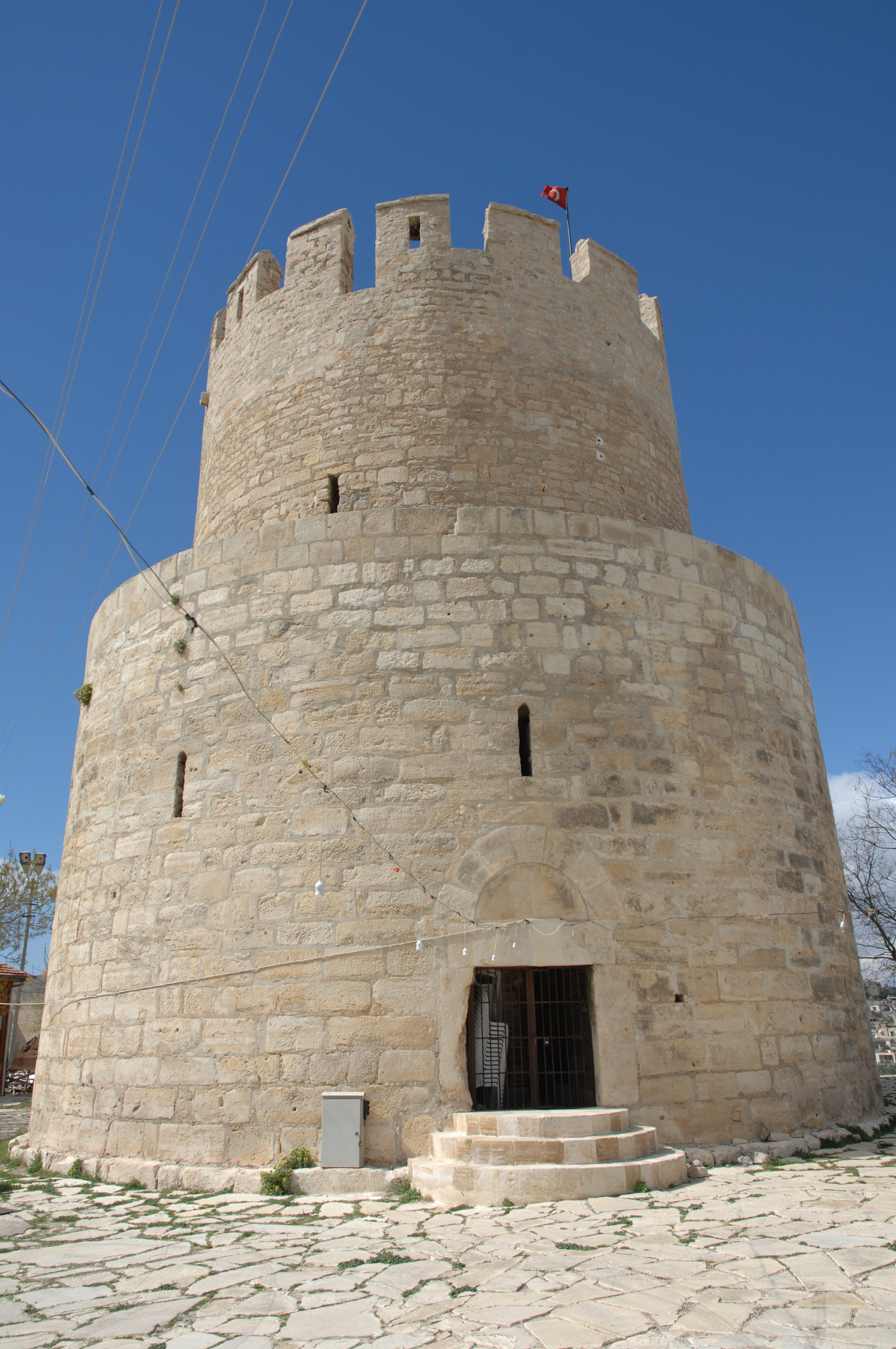
Mut citadel

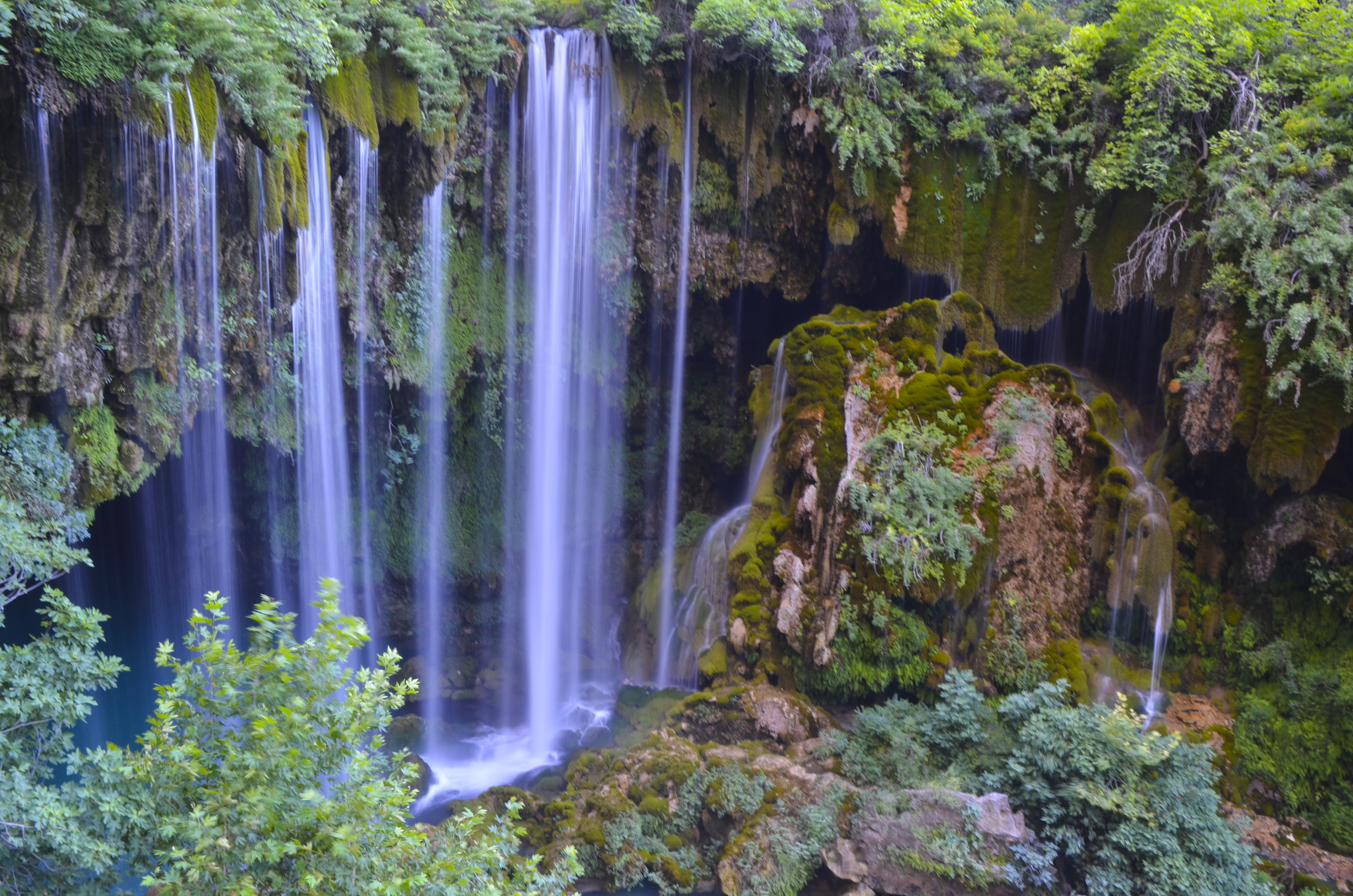
Yerköprü Şelalesi

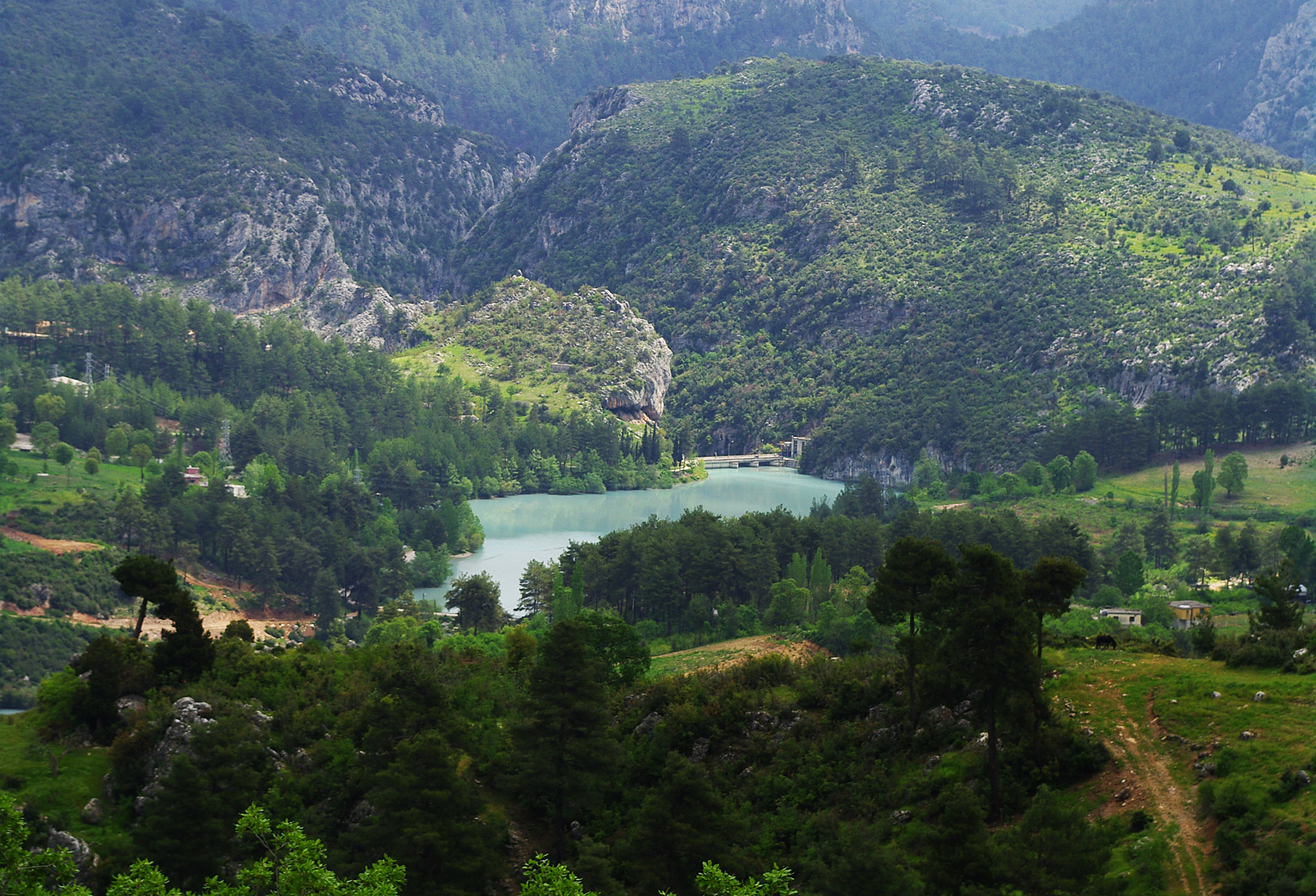
Çamlıyayla
Kadıncık dam

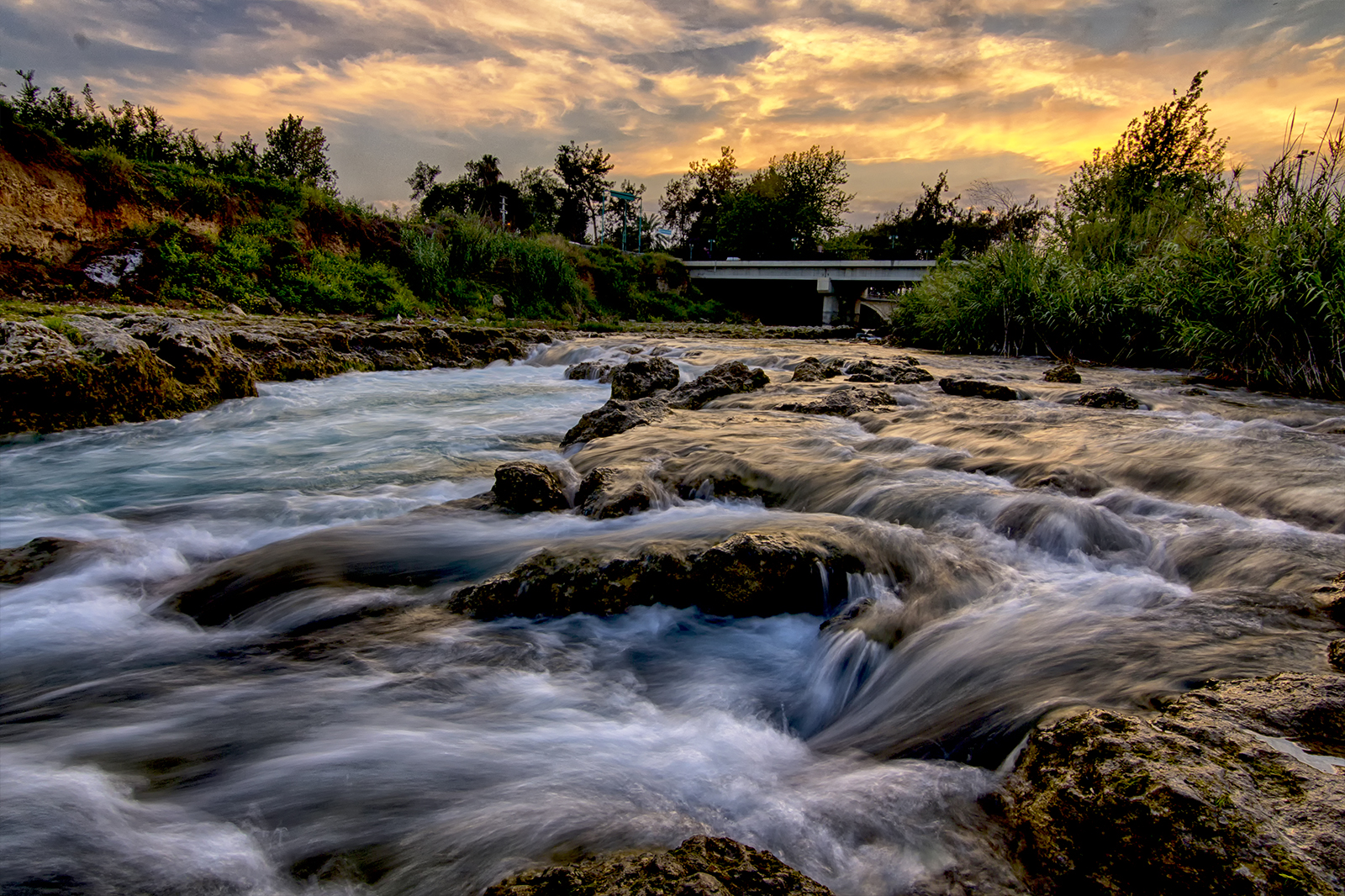
Berdan river

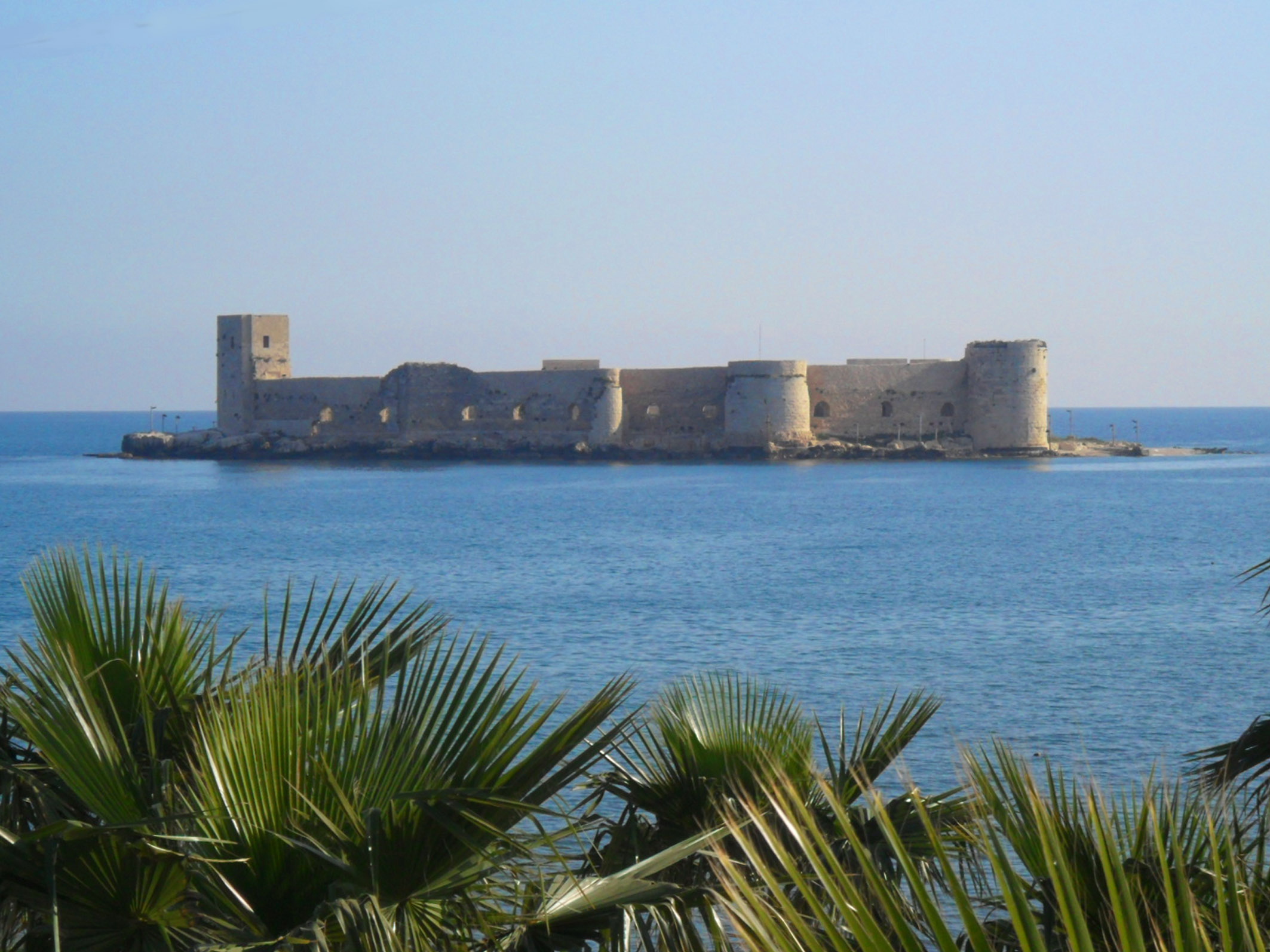
Erdemli
Maiden's castle

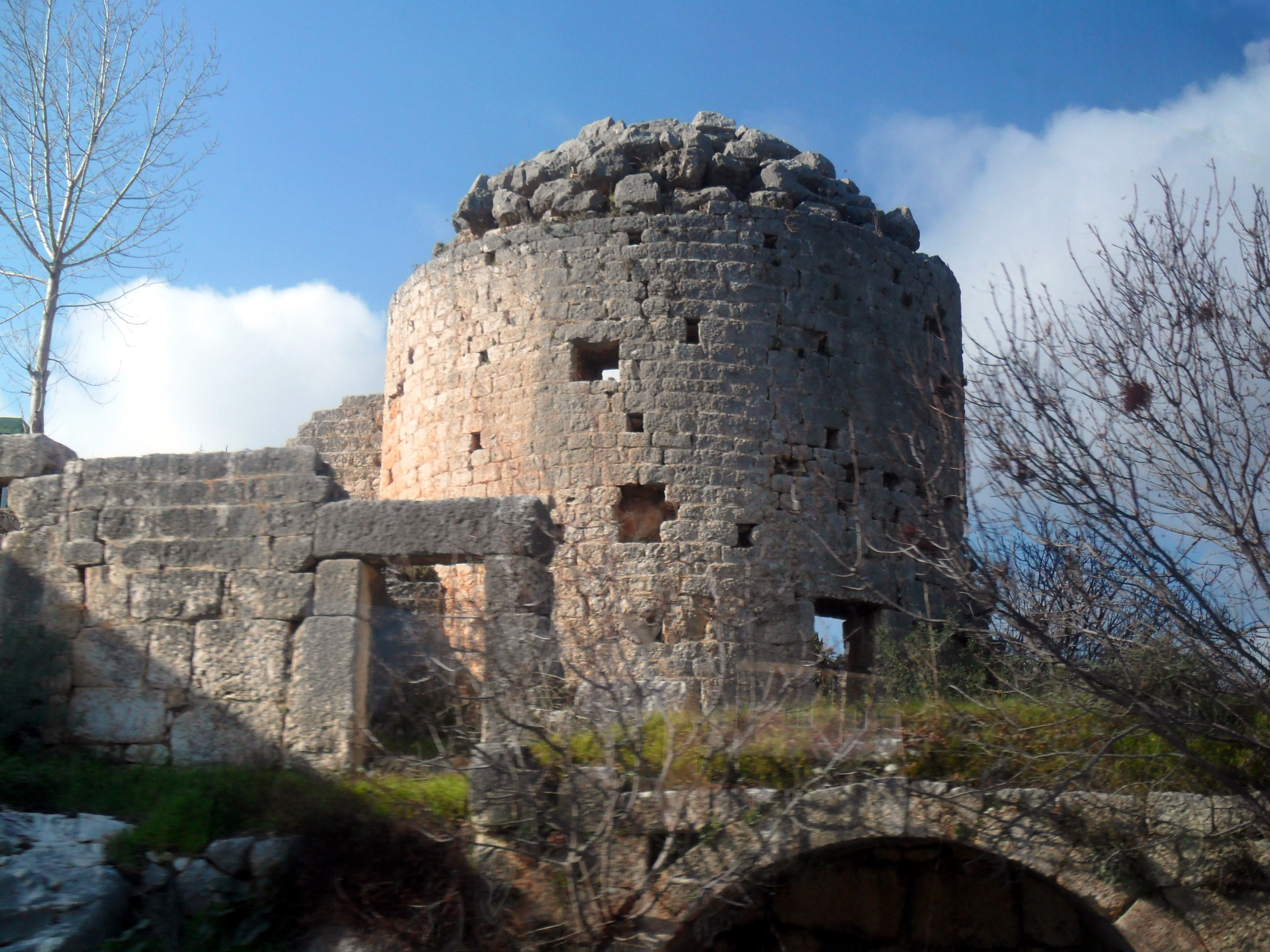
Hasanaliler Church, Mersin Province.

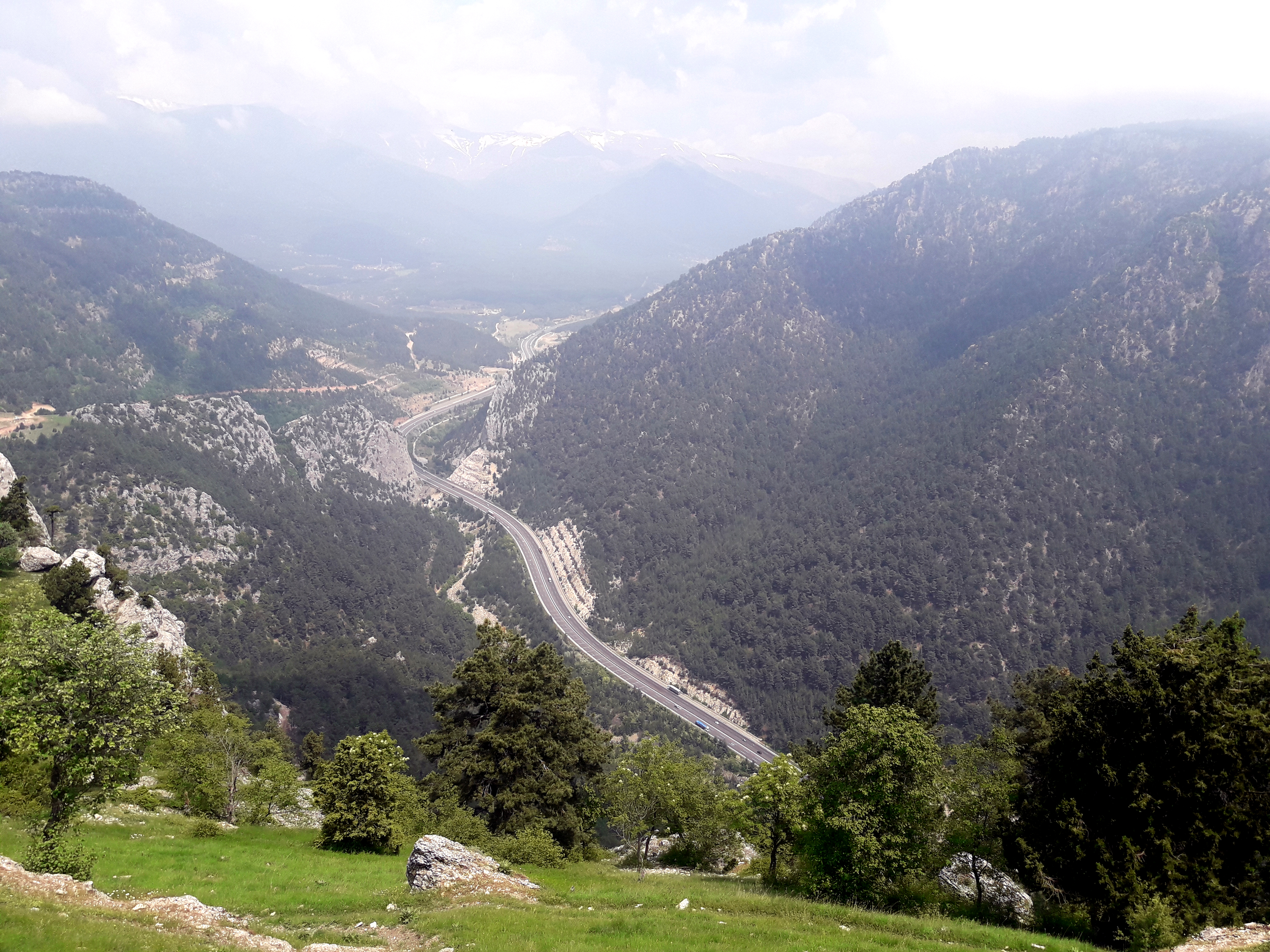
View from Gülek Castle, Mersin Province.

== See also ==
- List of populated places in Mersin Province
