= Cambazlı ruins =

Archaeological site in Mersin Province, Turkey

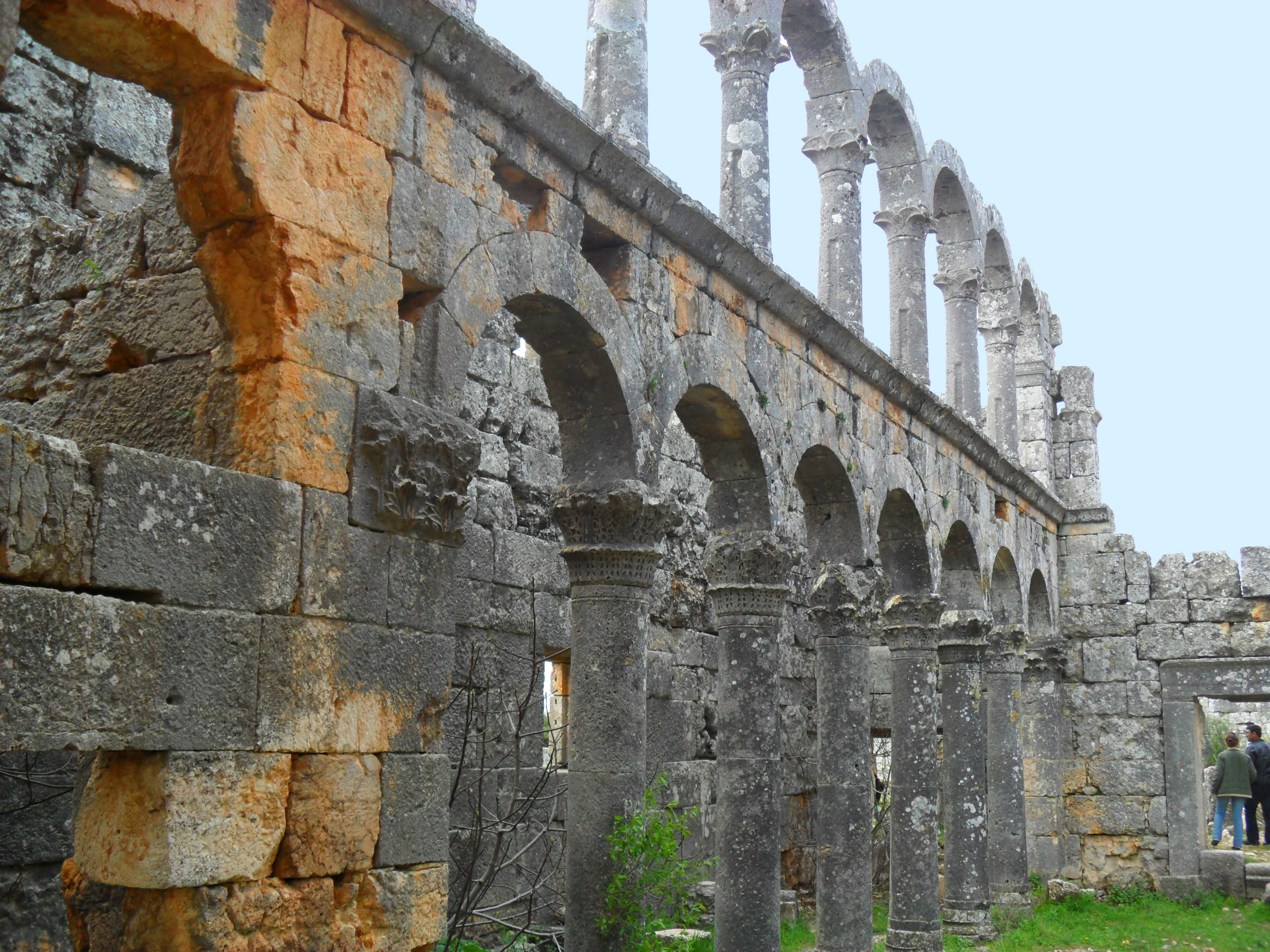

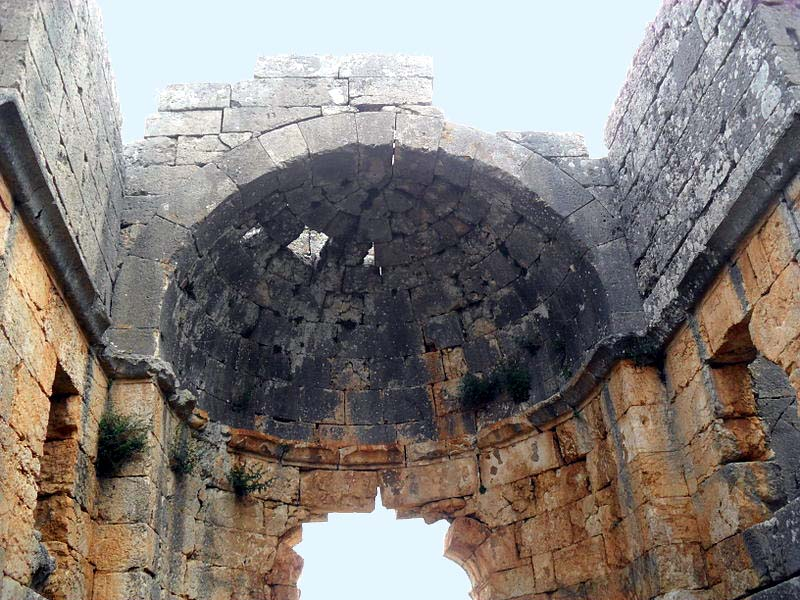

Cambazlı is an archaeological site in Mersin Province, Turkey

== Geography ==
Cambazlı is in the plateau to the south of the Toros Mountains at 36°35′N 34°02′E which is a part of a wide region which was called Cilicia Trachaea in the antiquity. It is situated in a village with the same name. Administratively, it is part of Silifke district of Mersin Province. Its distance to Silifke is 30 kilometres (19 mi) and to Mersin is 85 kilometres (53 mi).

== History ==
The original name of the settlement is not known. But it was an important settlement because it was connected to other important ancient settlements like Corycus and Diocaesarea by Roman roads. Although It dates back to late Hellenistic age, it was also inhabited during the Roman and Byzantine eras.

== The ruins ==
There are ruins of mausoleums, rock tombs and cisterns around the village. But the most important building is a 13x 20 m early Byzantine era (5th century) basilica with three naves. (Turkish: Cambazlı Kilisesi) The columns with Corinth type headings in the southern side as well as the apse a part of the walls are standing; but the columns in the northern side have been demolished.

== Gallery ==
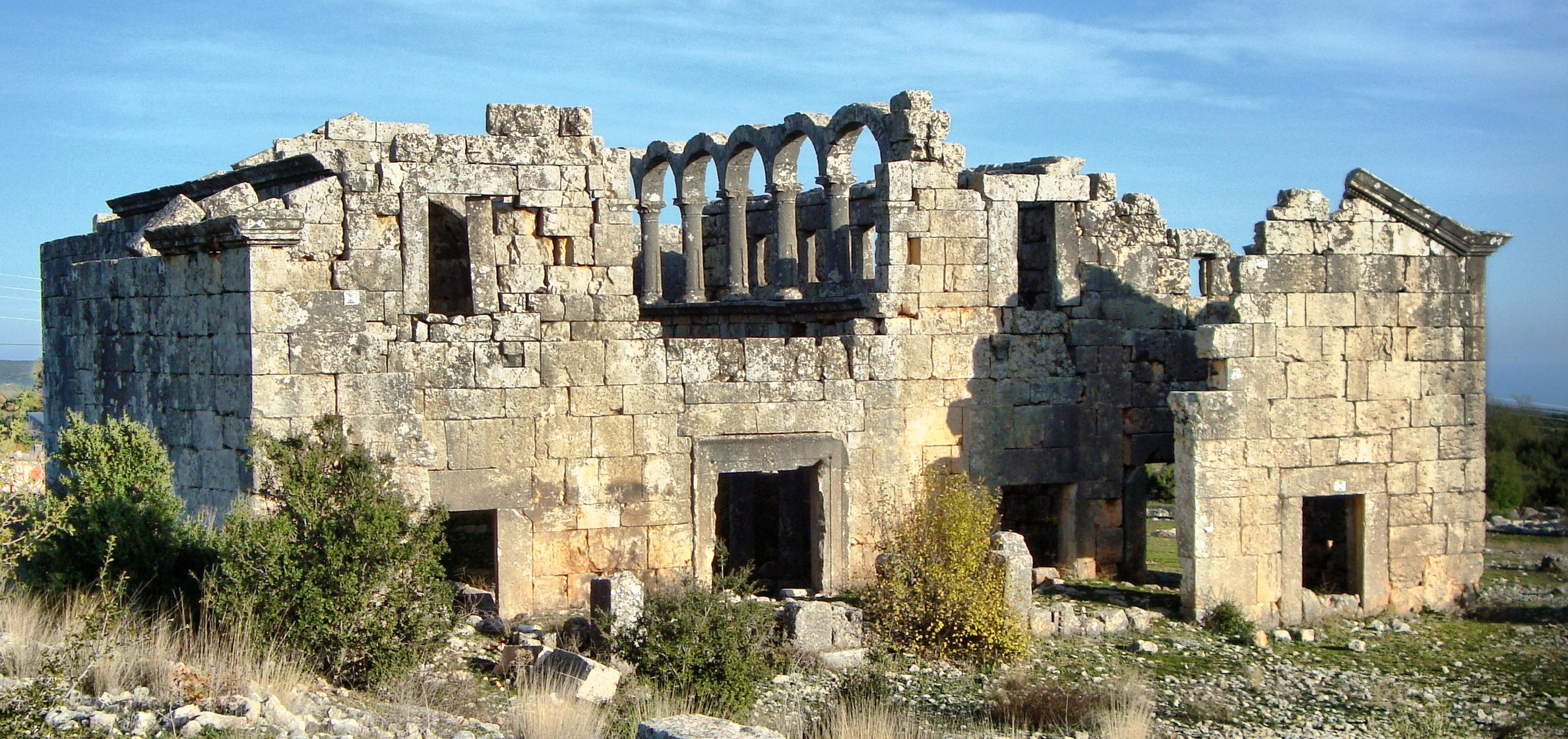
Panoramic view of Cambazlı Byzantine Church

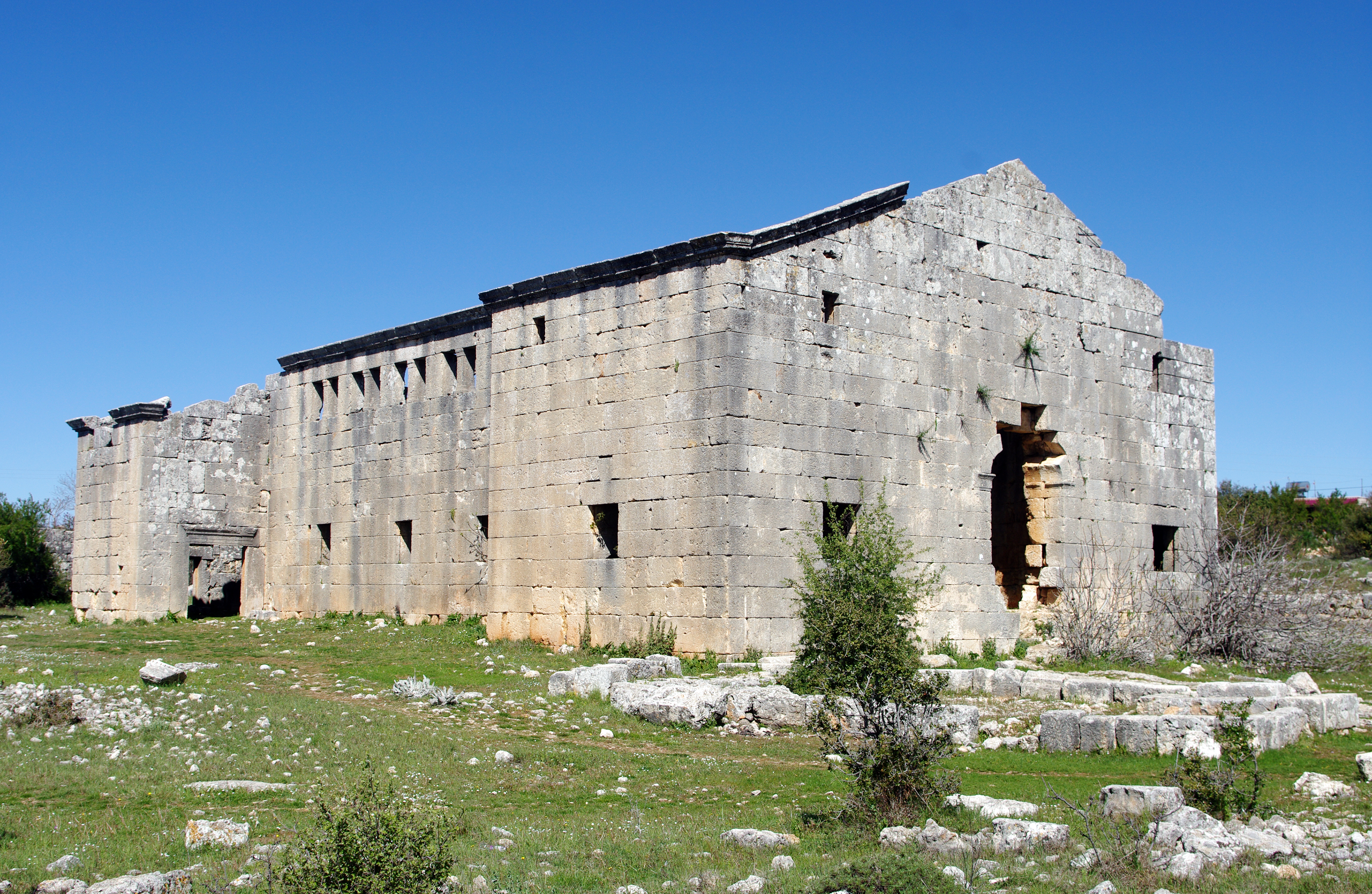
A view from the southeast façade of the Cambazlı Byzantine Church ruins

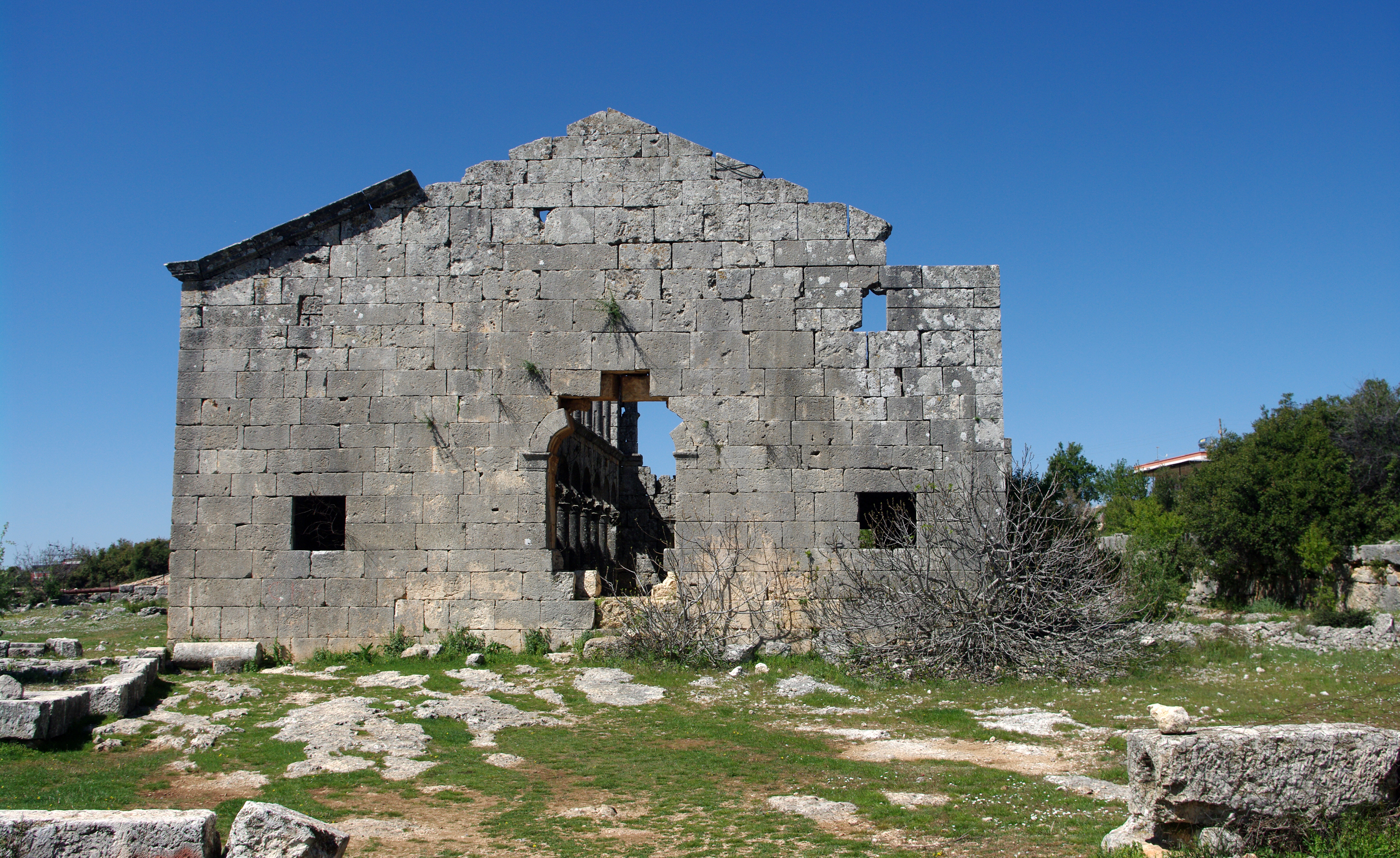
A view from the eastern facade of the Cambazlı Byzantine Church ruins

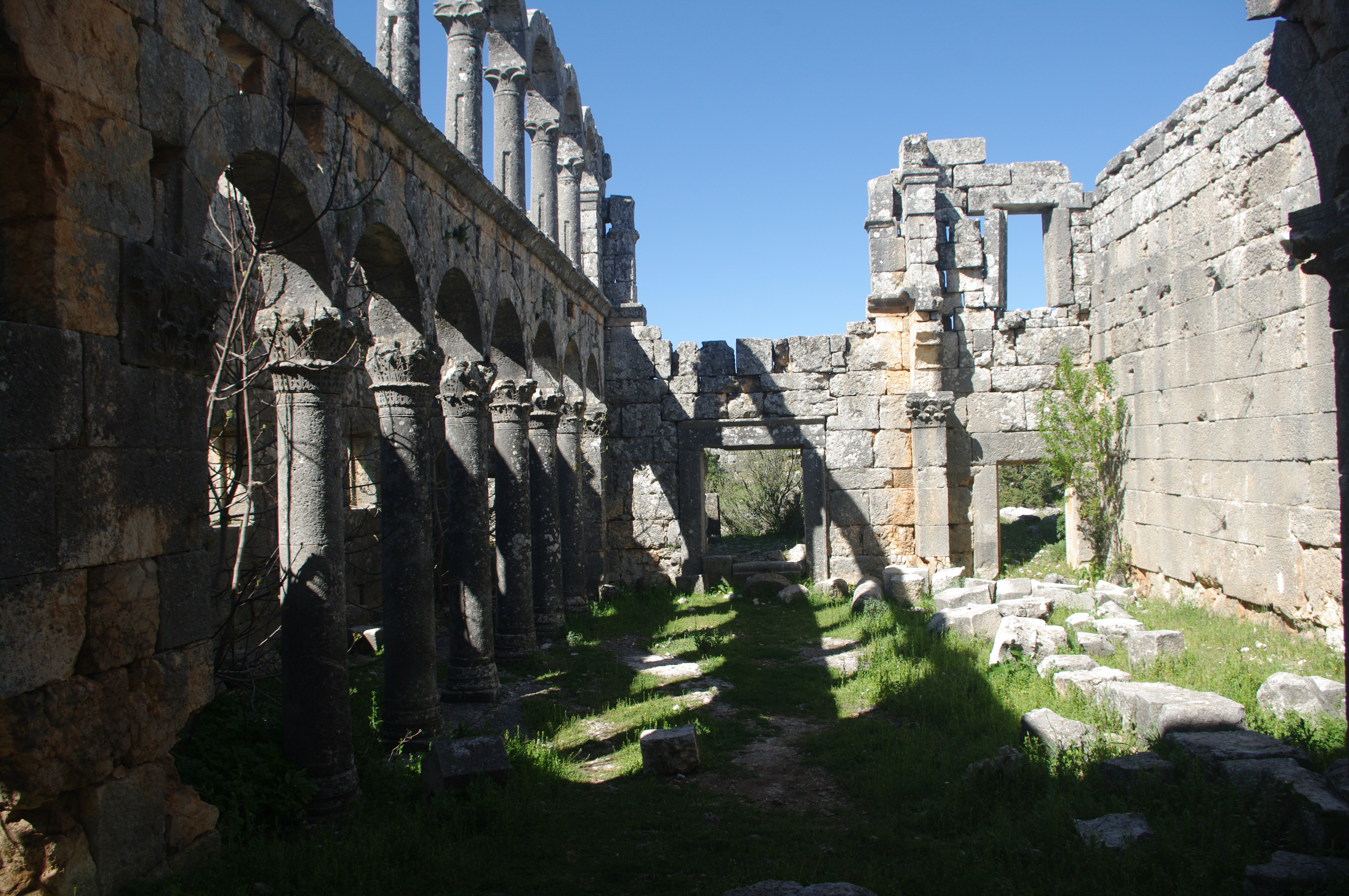
An interior view of the Byzantine Church ruins in Cambazlı

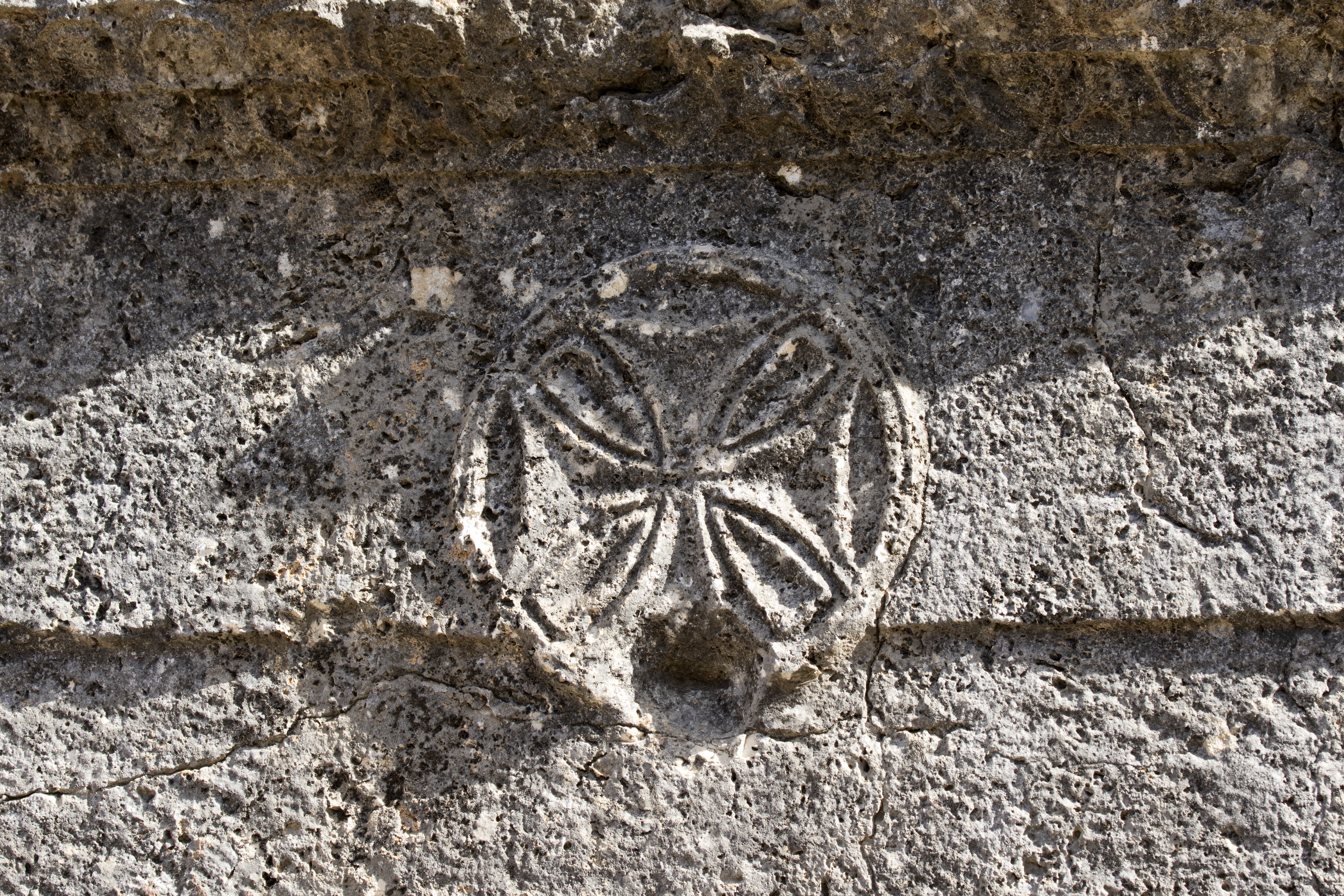
Cross motif on the east entrance door of Cambazlı Church

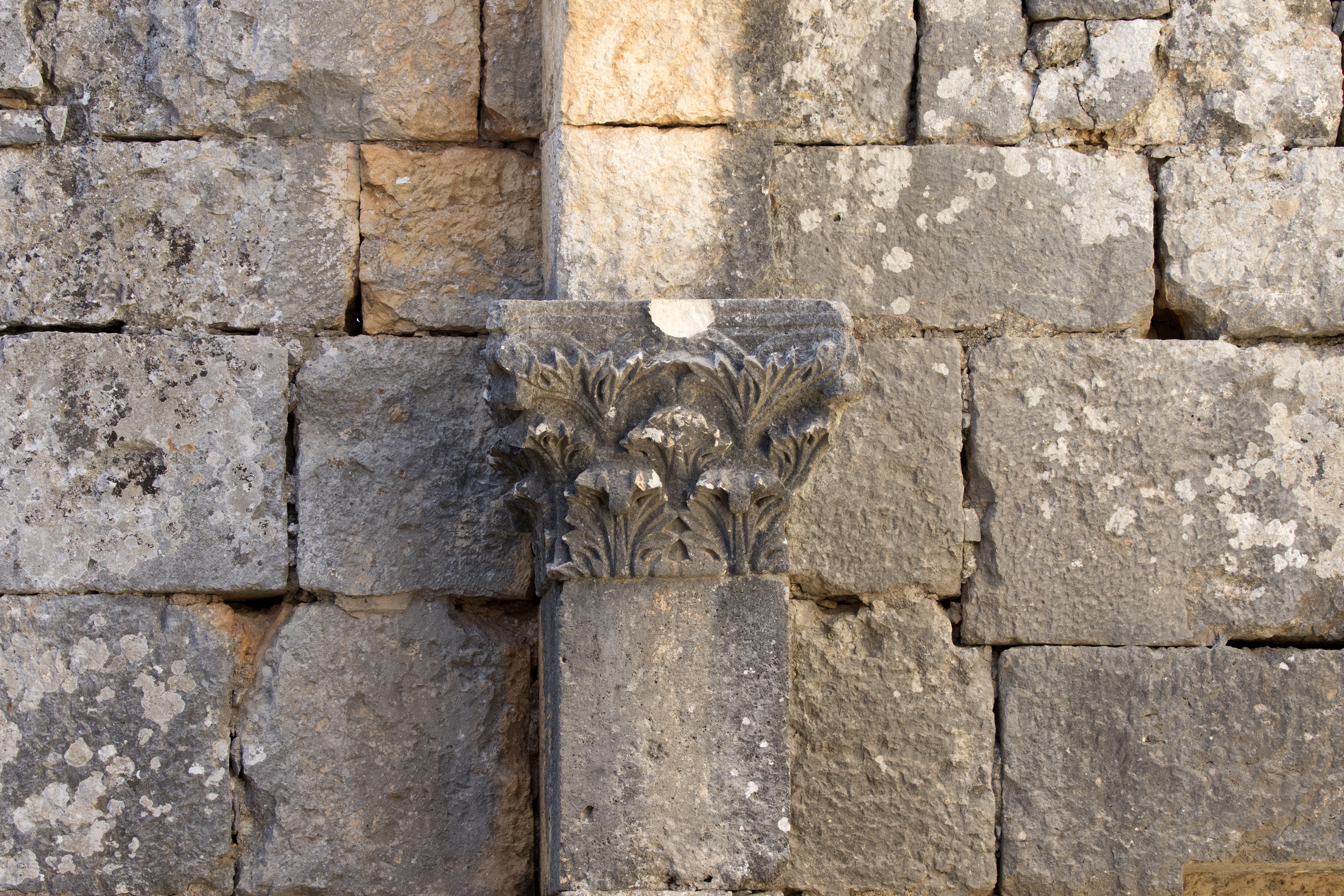
A partial view from the north side walls of Cambazlı Church

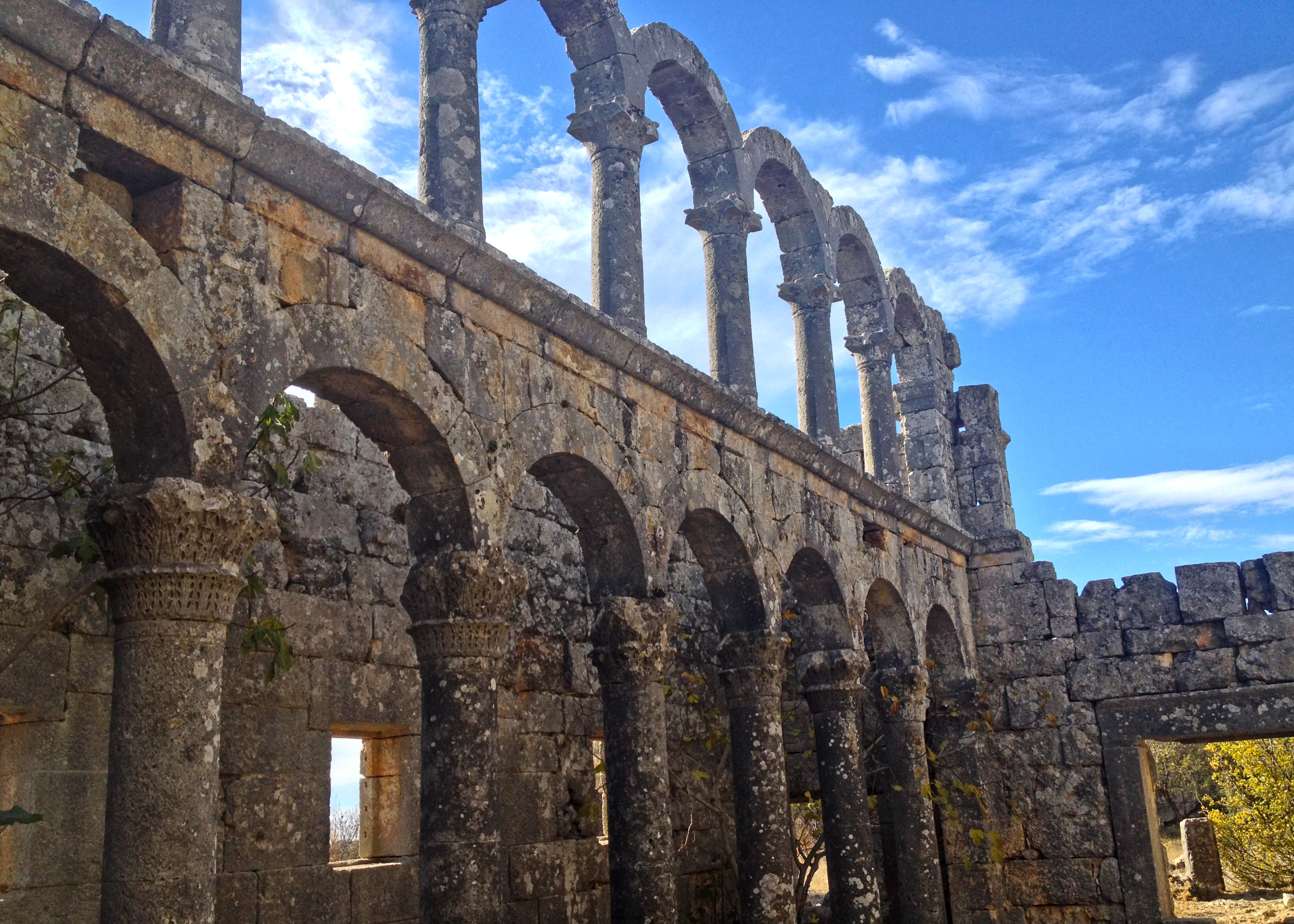
A view from the interior of Cambazlı Church

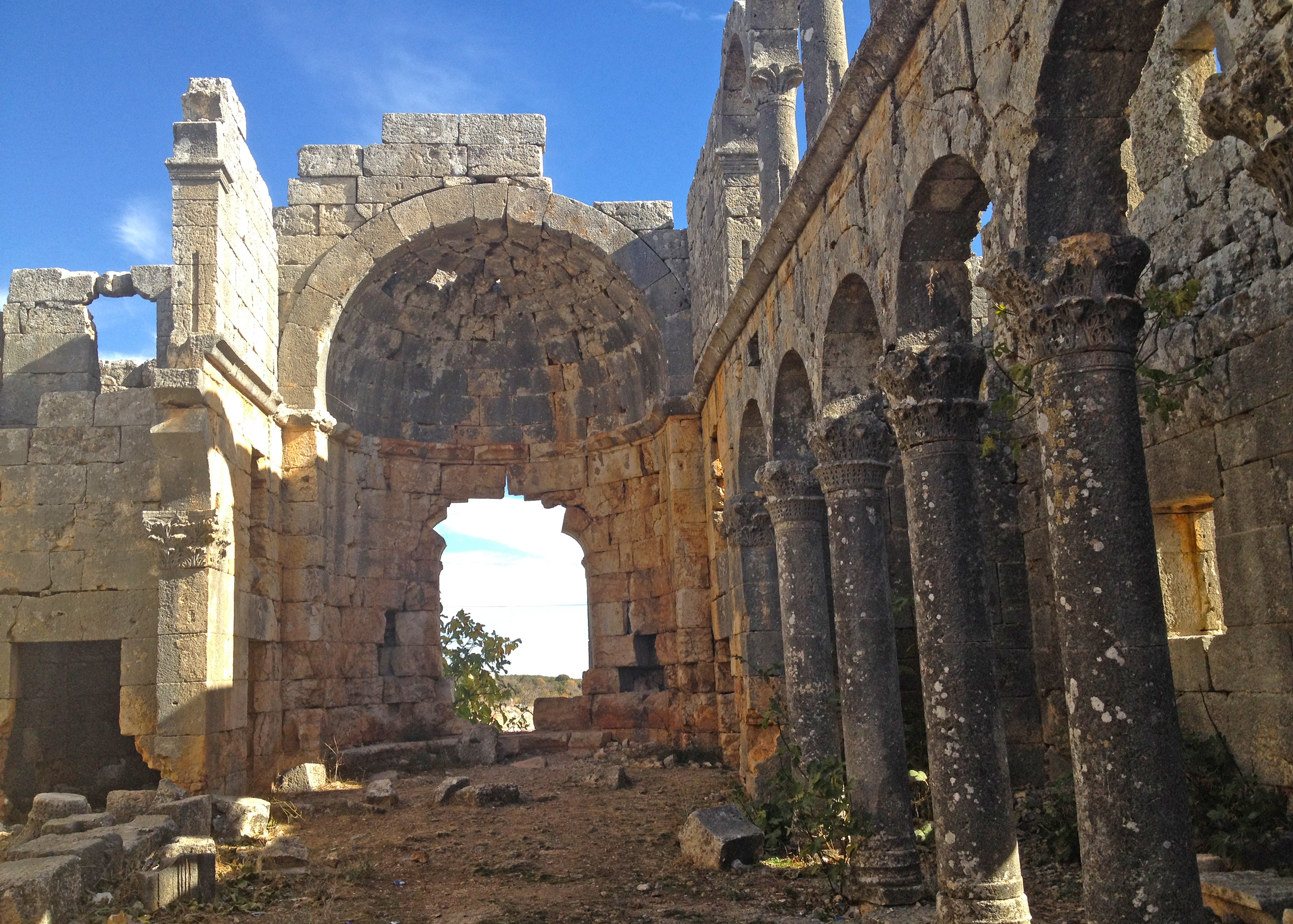
A view from the apse of Cambazlı Church

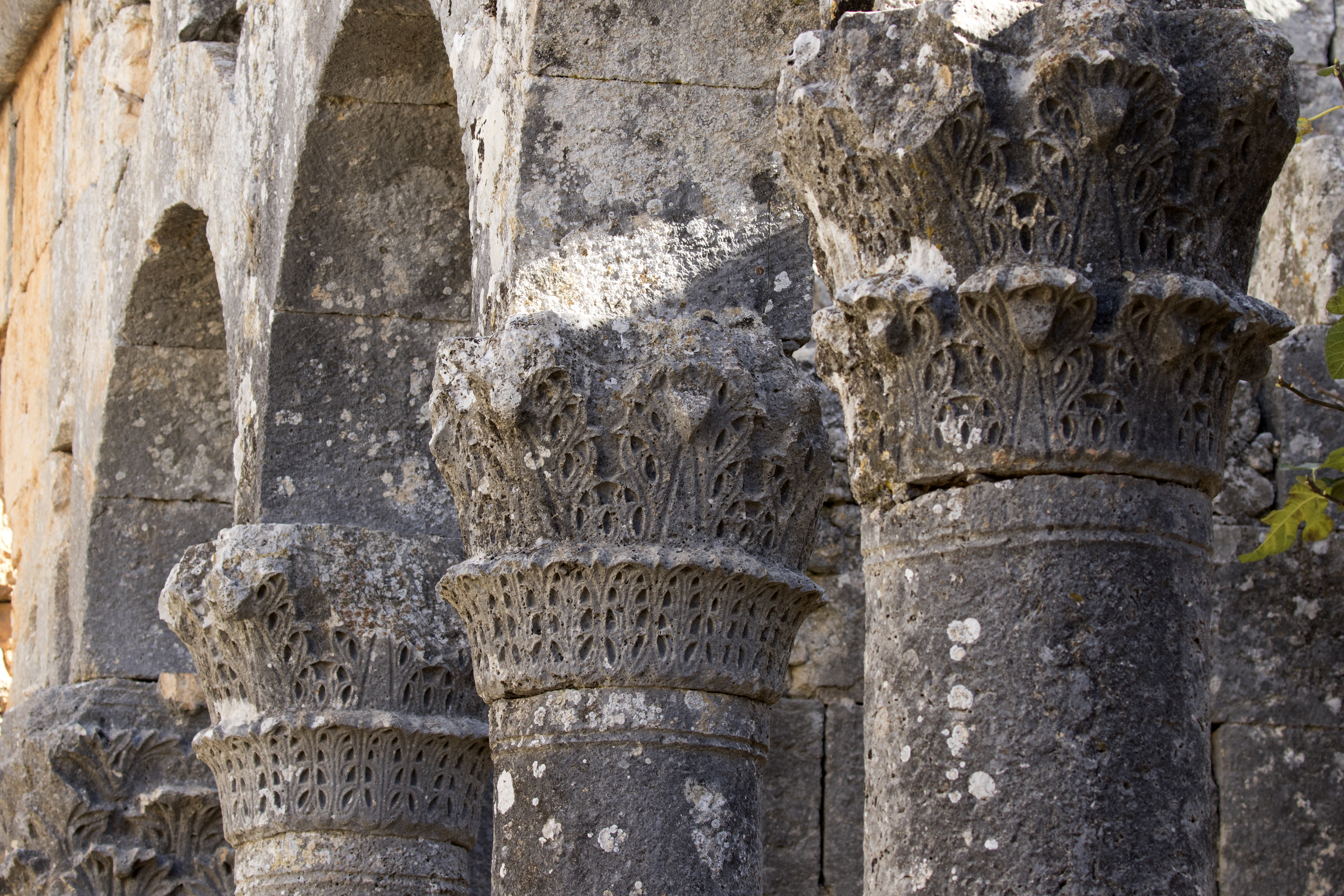
Corinthian type column capitals on the south side of Cambazlı Church
