= Transport in Mersin Province =

Transport in Turkish province

Mersin Province is a Mediterraneran province of Turkey. The south eastern plain of the province is a part of Çukurova (or historically Cilicia Pedias ). But most of the province is mountainous with a number of small alluvial plains at the coastal band. Below are the transport facilities of the province.

== Railroad ==
There are two railroads. One line (constructed in 1882) connects Mersin to Adana at the east. That line known as Adana–Mersin Railway Line has 7 stops in Mersin Province most of which are used by the commuter trains. Mersin Railway Station is the southernmost train terminal of Turkey and by a tail line it is connected to Port of Mersin. Tarsus Railway Station is in Tarsus, the second most populous city of the province. Yenice Railway Station in Yenice town is another important station, because it is the connection point of the Adana Mersin line and a second line from the Central Anatolia.

== Highways ==
The following table lists the motorways and state highways in Mersin. The so-called Province roads (Turkish: İl yolu) which connect district centers to each other and the village roads are not shown.

Type	Name	Itinerary (total)	Itinerary (in Mersin Province)	Distance in Mersin Province
Motorway
Motorway	O-21	From Ankara to D400 junction (near Yenice)	From Kandilsırtı to D400 junction	54 km
Motorway	O-51	From Çeşmeli to Adana	From Çeşmeli to Arıklı (near Yenice)	75 km
State road
State road	D.400	From Datça to Esendere	From Kaledran to Arıklı (near Yenice)	316 km
State road	D.715	From Kulu makası to Silifke	From Akçeşme (near Sertavul Pass) to Silifke	112 km
State road	D.750	From Zonguldak to Tarsus	Kandilsırtı (near Gülek) to Tarsus	61 km

== Ports ==
There are several sea ports with harbor infrastructure. The most important port of the province (and one of the most important in Turkey) is the Port of Mersin.(For the infrastructure see Mersin Harbor). In the town of Taşucu (Holmi of the antiquity) near Silifke, there are two smaller ports. The rest in Bozyazı, Aydıncık, Yeşilovacık and Karaduvar ( east of Mersin) are even smaller fishing ports. There are two marinas, Mersin Marina and Kumkuyu Marina in Kumkuyu town of Erdemli district.

== Airport ==
At the moment there are no airports in the province. Because Adana Şakirpaşa Airport is only 65 kilometres (40 mi) east of Mersin. But a larger airport for all Çukurova is under planning. The new airport (Çukurova Airport) will be in Mersin Province.
