= Anamur Museum =

Archaeology museum in Anamur, Turkey

- Anamur Müzesi
- Anamur Museum
- Established: 1992; 34 years ago
- Location: Yalıevleri, Adnan Menderes cad.3, Anamur, Turkey
- Coordinates: 36°04′12″N 32°51′57″E
- Type: Archaeology, Ethnography
- Collections: Hellenistic period, Roman Empire, Byzantine Empire, Seljuk Empire, Ottoman Empire
- Collection size: 11552
- Owner: Ministry of Culture and Tourism
- Website: Anamur Museum

Anamur Museum is a museum of archaeology and ethnography in Anamur ilçe (district) of Mersin Province, southern Turkey.

== Location ==
The museum is the Yalıevleri (coastal) neighborhood of Anamur at 36°04′12″N 32°51′57″E. Mouth of Dragon Creek is to the 1,250 metres (4,100 ft) to the east of the museum. Its distance to Anamur centrum is about 2.5 kilometres (1.6 mi) and to Mersin is 220 kilometres (140 mi).

== History ==
In 1976, the building area of 260 square metres (2,800 sq ft) was allocated for the planned museum. But construction was delayed and the museum building was opened in 1992. Anamur area is rich in archaeological remains. Up to the establishment of the museum the finds were displayed in other museums, notably in Silifke and Alanya Museums. After 1992 Anamur based articles were returned to Anamur.

== The building and the displayed items ==
The upper floor of the two storey building is reserved the administration, library, photo lab and a conference room. The archaeology and ethnography display halls as well as the stock room and the cafeteria are in the ground floor. In the museum section in addition to finds in Anamur area, the finds in Bozyazı and Aydıncık (ancient Nagidos and Kelenderis respectively) are also displayed. In the archaeology hall there are coins, mosaics, oil lamps ornaments and the like from the Roman Empire era and earlier. Some examples in the ethnography hall are carpets, various equipment about coffee treat, powder horn, swords, metallic cookware, copper caldron, clocks etc. There are 3470 archaeology items, 849 ethnography items, 7105 coins and 124 stamps.
