= Dörtayak =

Ancient cenotaph in Turkey

Coordinates: 36°08′55″N 33°19′38″E

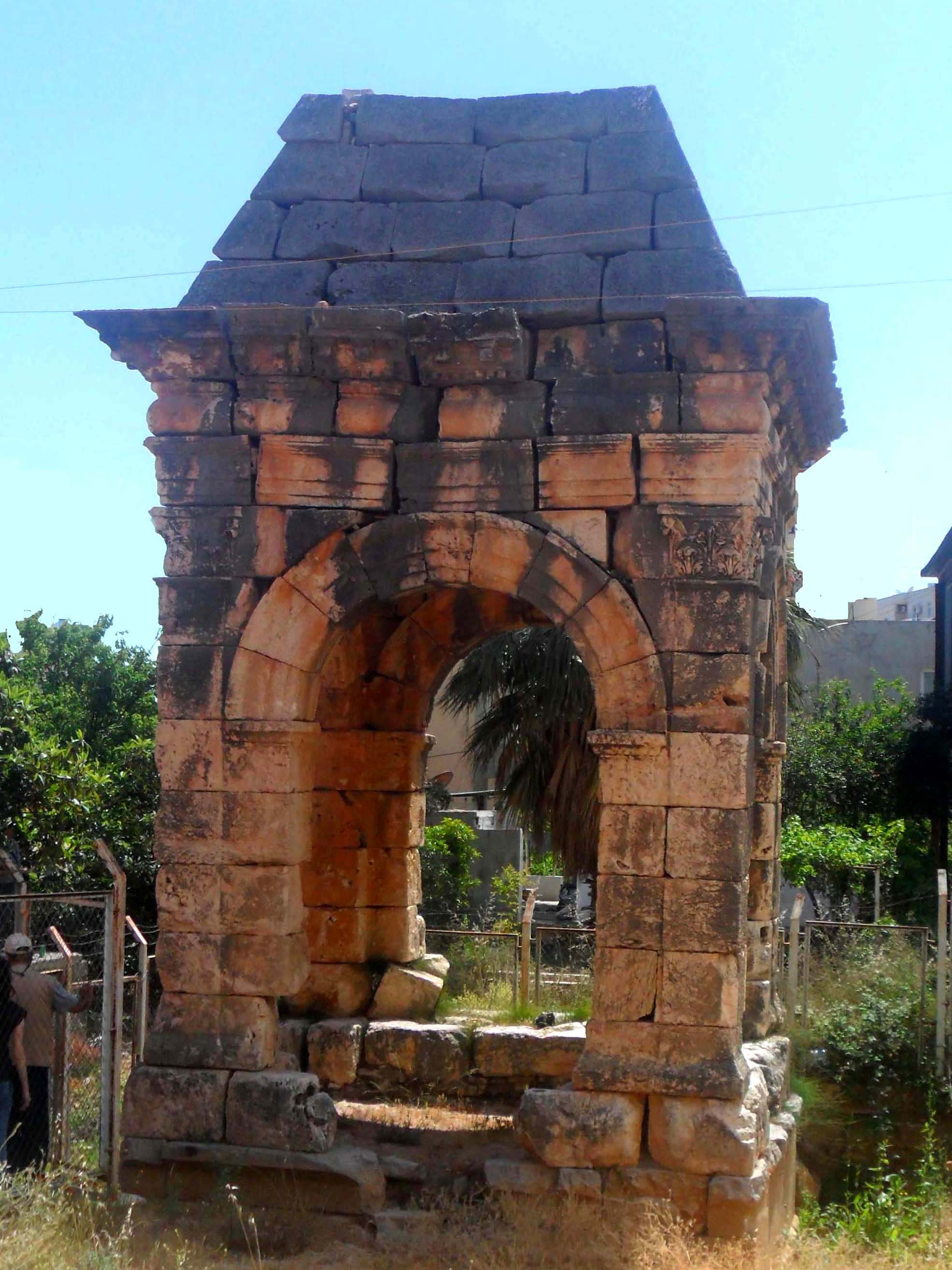

Dörtayak is an ancient cenotaph in ancient Kelenderis, modern Aydıncık of Mersin Province, Turkey

== Geography ==
It is close to the Turkish state highway D.400. Its distance to Mersin is 170 kilometres (110 mi).

== History ==
Although the building is known as a cenotaph, according to Aydıncık culture society it might also be a mausoleum. There are no documents about the history of the cenotaph. But judging from the architecture it is assumed to be built in the 2nd century AD during the Roman Empire.

== The building ==
The building has a square plan as its Turkish name suggests. (Turkish name Dörtayak means "Four feet") The four wide cut-stone columns in each corner are so oriented that the four sides of the building face the cardinal directions. Presently there are no side walls. The ceiling is supported by vaults. The total height of the building is 8 metres (26 ft). Its roof is pyramidal and this may indicate an Egyptian style.

== Historical references ==
Captain Francis Beaufort in 1812, describes this building as "it has a single arch on each side which supports a pyramidal roof of large stones and it seems to have been intended to contain a statue." According to Victor Langlois, "the building with large cut stones, rises conically . The top is decorated with a beautiful cornice"
