= Bilal-i Habeşi Masjid =

Historical small mosque in Tarsus, Mersin Province, Turkey

Bilal-i Habeşi Mosque
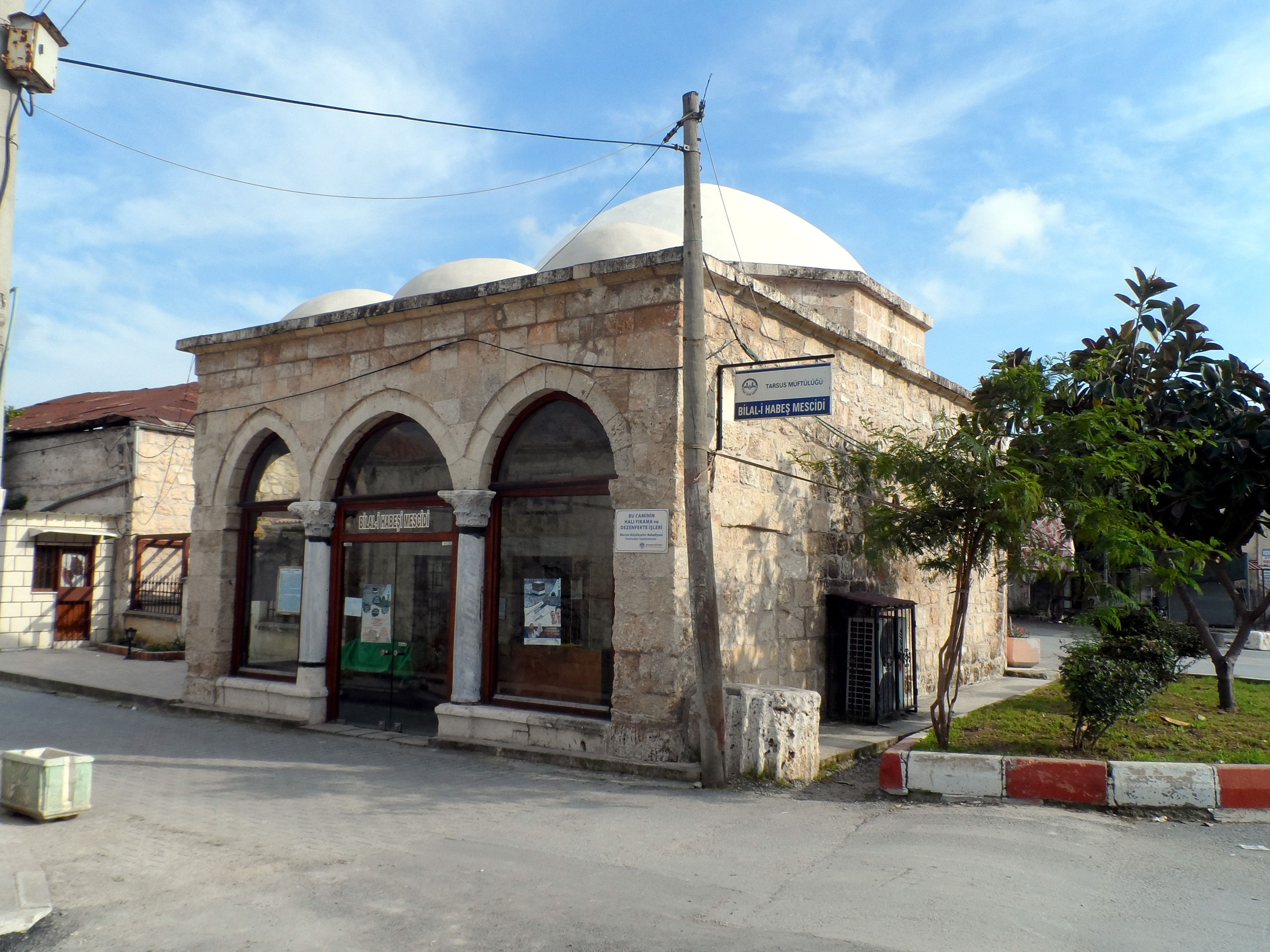

Religion
- Affiliation: Sunni Islam

Location
- Location: Tarsus, Mersin, Turkey
- Interactive map of Bilal-i Habeşi Mosque
- Coordinates: 36°54′55″N 34°53′49″E

Architecture
- Established: 16th century

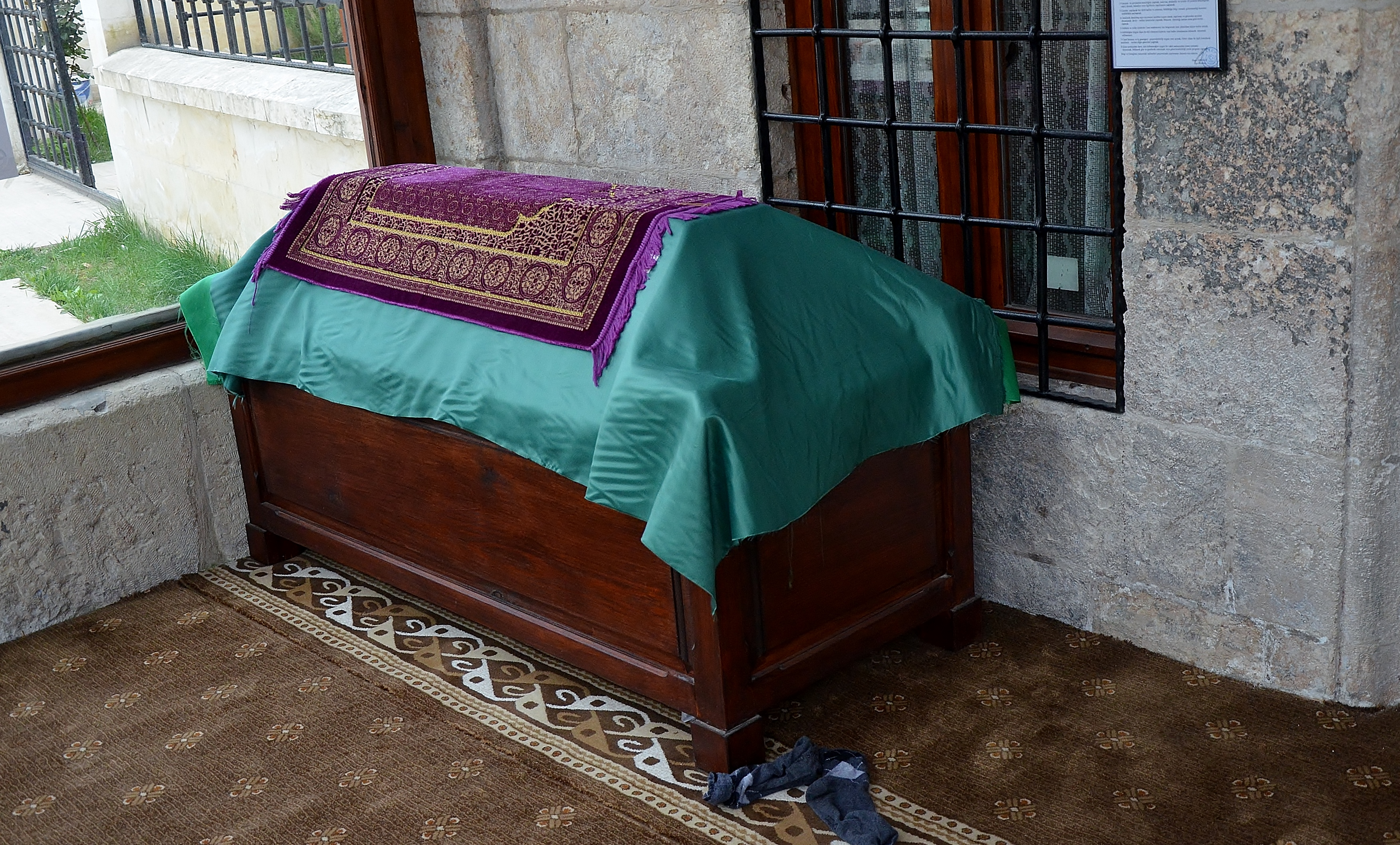
Sarcophagus inside the Bilal-i Habeşi Masjid

Bilal-i Habeşi Masjid is a historical small mosque in Tarsus, Mersin Province, Turkey.

The masjid is located in Tarsus ilçe (district) of Mersin Province between Grand Mosque of Tarsus and Saint Paul's Church, Tarsus.

== History ==
According to Ottoman documents a foundation named after Bilal ibn Rabah (580–640 AD), also known as Bilal al-Habeshi, Bilal ibn Riyah, and ibn Rabah, was established in 1519. Bilal was one of the most trusted and loyal companions (Sahabah) of the Islamic prophet Muhammad. It is believed that Bilal-i Habeşi went to Tarsus while visiting the places conquered during the reign of Caliph of Islam Umar (r. 634–644), and called to prayer at the site, where today the masjid is located. The word mescit (masjid) refers in Turkish to a small mosque. The masjid, which was named after Bilal was built in the 16th century.

== Architecture ==
The Masjid has a square plan and is covered by one big dome. The narthex has three openings and is topped by three domes. A sarcophagus is situated in the narthex.
