= Altından geçme =

Gate in the city wall of Tarsus, Turkey

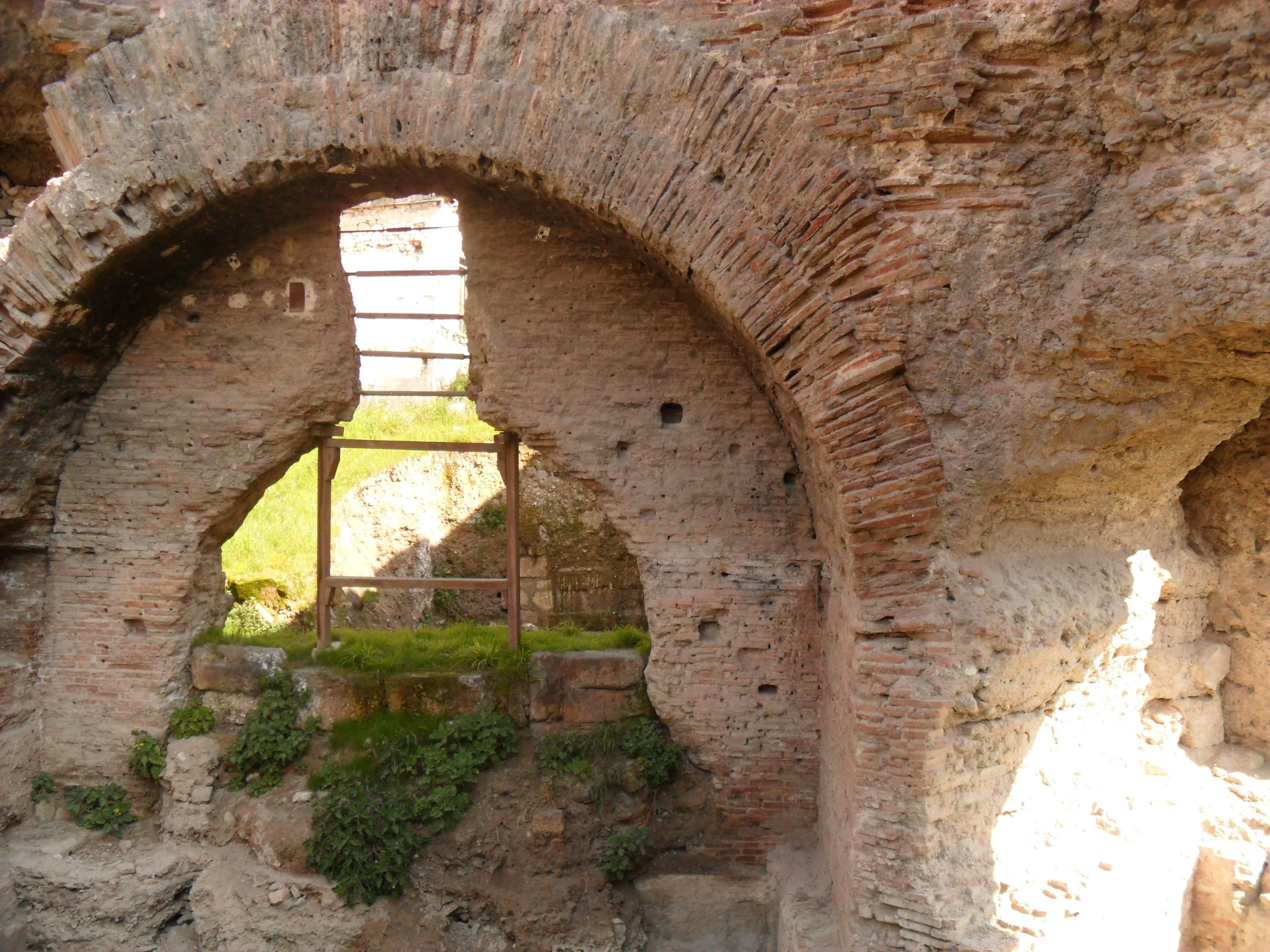
Eastern wall

Altından geçme 'underpass' is a gate in the city wall of Tarsus, Mersin Province, Turkey, originally part of a Roman bath.

== Geography ==
Tarsus is situated in Çukurova (ancient Cilicia) between Adana and Mersin. The bath is located in the urban fabric of Tarsus. It is situated to the north of Tarsus Old Mosque and Tarsus Grand Mosque and to the east of Saint Paul's well at 36°55′05″N 34°53′51″E.

== History ==
The bath was built in the 2nd or 3rd century during the Roman Empire. It was a big complex, most of which was destroyed during the earthquakes in the 6th century. The unaffected eastern part of the building was later used as a glass workshop during the Byzantine Empire.

== Details ==
The building material is rubble stone and the cement is Khorosan mortar. The bath used the water from Berdan River (ancient Cydnus), which was close by. However, because of constant floods, Byzantine Emperor Justinian I (reigned 527–565) had a channel constructed at the east of the city to facilitate easier flow. Thus presently the river is about 1,600 m (5,200 ft) away. A part of the southern wall was bored during the construction of an urban road. The maximum width of the so formed gate is 3.5 m (11 ft) and the height is 4 m (13 ft). The popular name of the gate is Altından geçme 'underpass'.
