= Hasanaliler Church =

Church ruin in Mersin Province, Turkey

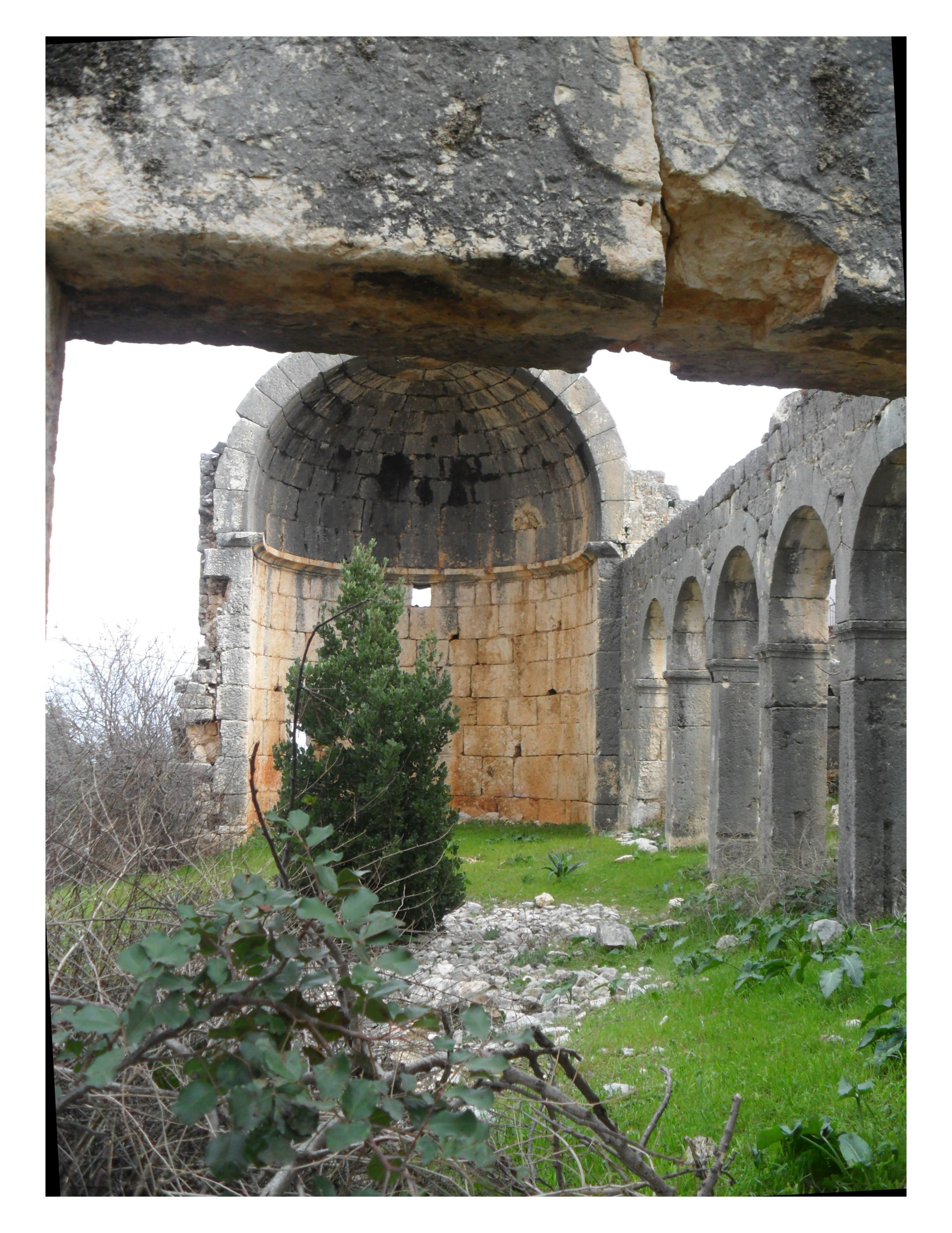
Hasanaliler Church

Hasanaliler Church is a church ruin in Mersin Province, Turkey.

Hasanaliler is the name of a village which is now a neighborhood of Narlıkuyu in Silifke ilçe (district). The church ruin is in the village north of the mosque at 36°27′50″N 34°05′11″E. Cennet and Cehennem sinkholes are nearby. Its distance to Narlıkuyu (Mediterranean Sea side) is about 4 kilometres (2.5 mi), to Silifke is 18 kilometres (11 mi) and to Mersin is 62 kilometres (39 mi).

The church is a 6th-century Byzantine church. It is a basilica-type church. The narthex of the three-nave church is to the west of the building. There is a cistern under the building.
