= List of municipalities in Mersin Province =

This is the List of municipalities in Mersin Province, Turkey as of October 2007.

== Municipalities ==
District	Municipality
Anamur	Anamur
Anamur	Çarıklar
Anamur	Ören
Aydıncık	Aydıncık
Bozyazı	Bozyazı
Bozyazı	Tekeli
Bozyazı	Tekmen
Çamlıyayla	Çamlıyayla
Çamlıyayla	Sebil
Erdemli	Arpaçbahşiş
Erdemli	Ayaş
Erdemli	Çeşmeli
Erdemli	Erdemli
Erdemli	Esenpınar
Erdemli	Kargıpınarı
Erdemli	Kızkalesi
Erdemli	Kocahasanlı
Erdemli	Kumkuyu
Erdemli	Limonlu
Erdemli	Tömük
Gülnar	Büyükeceli
Gülnar	Gülnar
Gülnar	Köseçobanlı
Gülnar	Kuskan
Gülnar	Zeyne
Mersin (Merkez)	Adanalıoğlu
Mersin	Akdeniz
Mersin	Arpaçsakarlar
Mersin	Arslanköy
Mersin	Ayvagediği
Mersin	Bahçeli
Mersin	Çiftlikköy
Mersin	Davultepe
Mersin	Değirmençay
Mersin	Dikilitaş
Mersin	Dorukkent
Mersin	Fındıkpınarı
Mersin	Gözne
Mersin	Güzelyayla
Mersin	Karacailyas
Mersin	Kazanlı
Mersin	Kuyuluk
Mersin	Mezitli
Mersin	Soğucak
Mersin	Tece
Mersin	Tepeköy
Mersin	Toroslar
Mersin	Yalınayak
Mersin	Yenişehir
Mersin	Yenitaşkent
Mut	Göksu
Mut	Mut
Silifke	Akdere
Silifke	Arkum
Silifke	Atakent
Silifke	Atayurt
Silifke	Narlıkuyu
Silifke	Silifke
Silifke	Taşucu
Silifke	Uzuncaburç
Silifke	Yeşilovacık
Tarsus	Atalar
Tarsus	Bağcılar
Tarsus	Bahşiş
Tarsus	Gülek
Tarsus	Huzurkent
Tarsus	Tarsus
Tarsus	Yenice
Tarsus	Yeşiltepe

== Changes in 2014 ==
According to Law act no. 6360, belde (town) municipalities within provinces with more than 750,000 population (so called Metropolitan municipalities) were abolished as of 30 March 2014. 41 belde municipalities in the above list are now defunct. The list is kept for historical reference.

== See also ==
- List of populated places in Mersin Province
