= Kalanthia =

Coastal town of ancient Cilicia

- Interactive map of Kalanthia
- 36°36′27″N 34°18′18″E
- Type: Coastal town
- Cultures: Roman, Byzantine
- Location: Near Erdemli, Asiatic Turkey
- Region: Ancient Cilicia

History
- Built: Roman era
- Abandoned: Byzantine era

Site notes
- Condition: Ruins
- Public access: Yes

Kalanthia (Ancient Greek: Καλανθία) was a coastal town of ancient Cilicia, inhabited during the Roman and Byzantine eras.

== Location ==
Its site is located near Erdemli in Asiatic Turkey.

Kalanthia is situated approximately 10 km northeast of Erdemli, 2 km west of the Erdemli-Güzeloluk road. Ancient sources indicate that it was located 100 stadia east of the city of Elaiussa Sebaste and 150 stadia west of Soli. This location corresponds to the present-day Erdemli district. The ancient city is situated right next to the river known as the Alata River.

== Name and Etymology ==
According to Bilge Umar, the original name of the settlement was Kalanda or Kala(wa)nd, which may mean “with a pier.” This name emphasizes the region’s character as a coastal area and a village with a pier. During the Hellenistic period, the city was known as Kalanthia.

== History ==
=== Prehistoric and Ancient Periods ===
The history of settlement in the region dates back quite far. It is known that during the prehistoric period, the local population lived in caves within the valley canyons and later moved to mound-type settlements in places such as Çeşmeli, Tömük, and Kocahasanlı. In the 2nd millennium BCE, local principalities were established under the name “Kalakka,” and these principalities remained under the influence of the Hittite Empire. Kemeryayla emerged as an important trade center during this period.

=== Roman and Byzantine Periods ===
Kalanthia continued to exist during the Roman and Early Byzantine periods. However, this settlement is no longer mentioned in Byzantine-period sources. According to information provided by the Austrian Byzantinist Friedrich Hild and the German Byzantinist Hansgerd Hellenkemper, in Uzzano’s portolan (nautical chart) from 1374, a place named Gondaslas is listed between Korikos and Adana, and there was also a church or monastery there.

=== Ruins ===
In the hillside settlement known as Old Erdemli, located northwest of present-day Erdemli, there are ruins that may belong to Kalanthia. These ruins include a large early Byzantine-era basilica—of which only the apse remains today and which was occasionally used as a mosque—as well as numerous house ruins, rock-cut tombs, and sarcophagi.
