= Karacaoğlan River =

River in Turkey

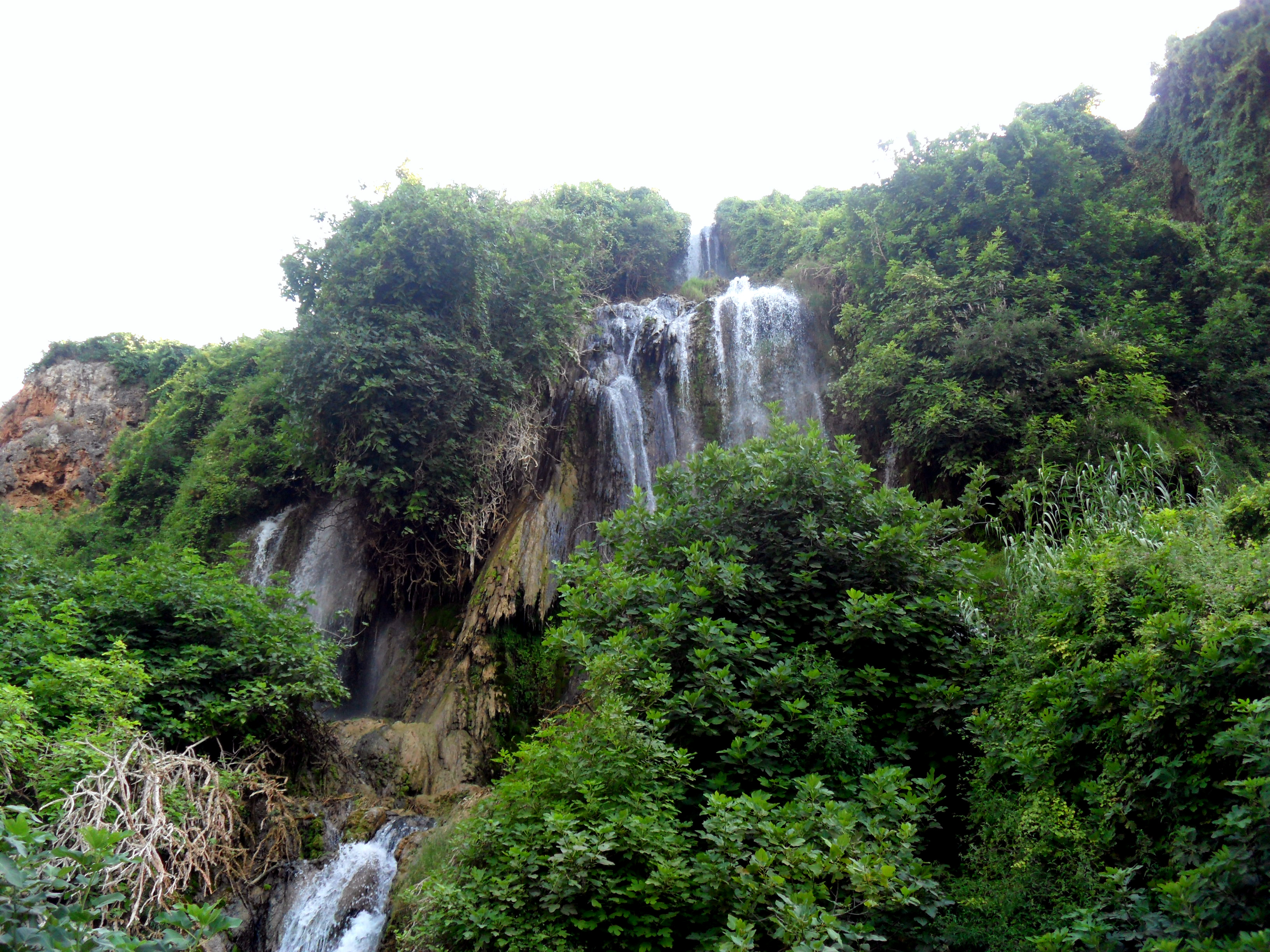
Karacaoğlan Waterfall in Mersin Province, Turkey

Karacaoğlan River (or Karacaoğlan Creek, Turkish: Karacaoğlan Deresi) is a small river in Erdemli ilçe (district) of Mersin Province, Turkey. Its headwaters are around Tepeköy in the Toros Mountains. It has a number of names depending on the villages around such as; Şahna, Müğlü, Dikiner, Sandal, Kargıpınarı (or Gilindire; the former name of Kargıpınarı). In the lower reaches in Çukurova (Cilician) plains it is used for irrigation . During the post-rainy seasons its excess water flows over the cliffs to create a waterfall to the east of Elvanlı. The waterfall is a popular excursion area for Mersin citizens. The river then flows between the towns of Kargıpınarı and Çeşmeli and discharges to Mediterranean Sea at 36°39′51″N 34°25′42″E.
