= Tömük Creek =

Irregular-flow creek in Turkey

Tömük Creek (also called Karakız) is an irregular-flow creek in Turkey.

It is in Erdemli ilçe (district) of Mersin Province. The upper reaches are in Toros Mountains at 1,500 metres (4,900 ft) altitude. However, after the construction of Karakız Lake now it is fed by the lake Its main course is toward south east. After flowing through Karahıdırlı and Tömük it flows to Mediterranean Sea at 36°38′34″N 34°22′38″E. The creek supplies the water to the agricultural area around Tömük
