= Güzeloluk Mosque =

Mosque in Güzeloluk, Erdemli, Mersin, Turkey

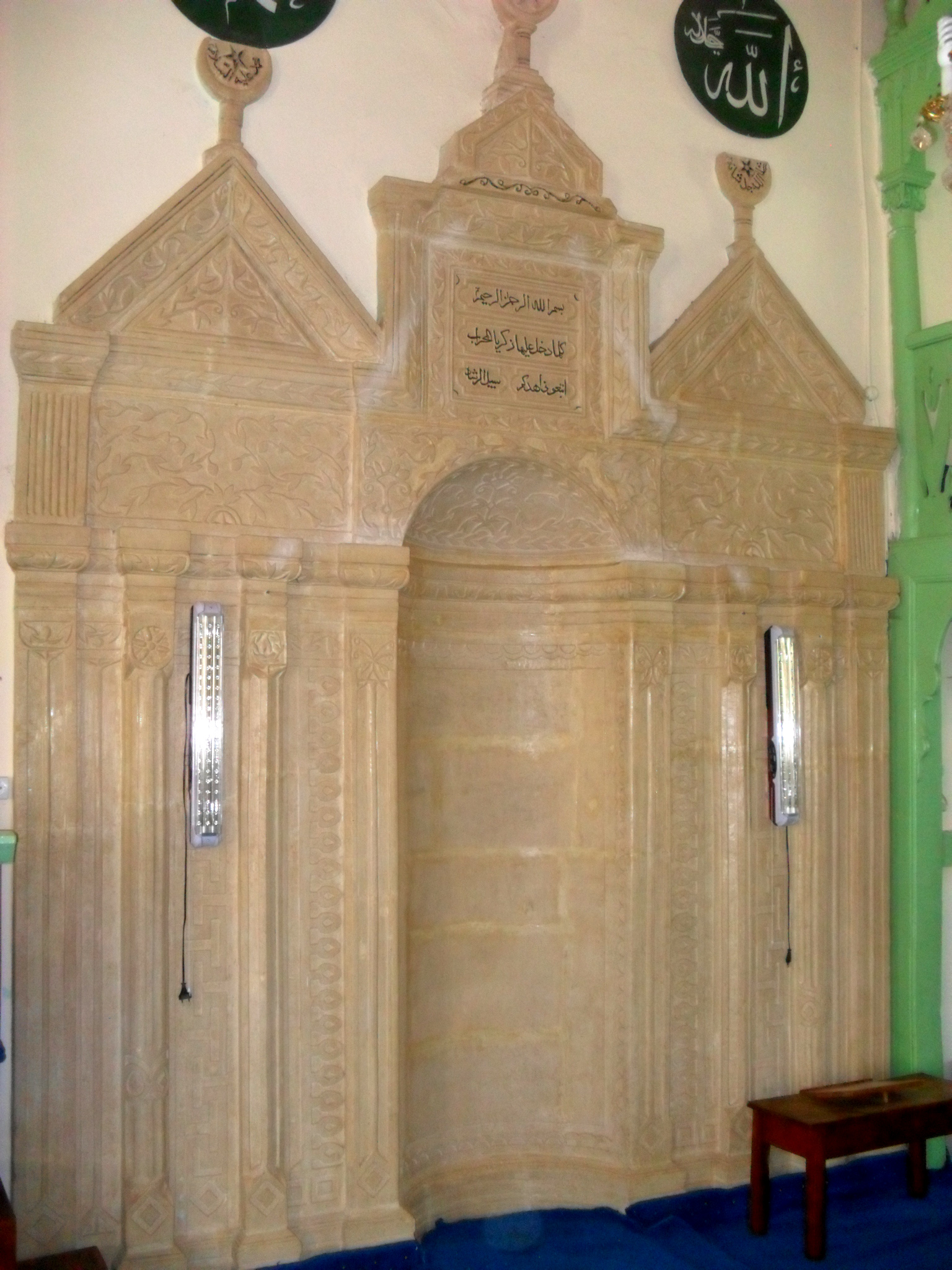
- Mihrab of the mosque

Religion
- Affiliation: Islam
- Ecclesiastical or organisational status: Active

Location
- Location: Güzeloluk, Erdemli; Mersin Province, Turkey
- Interactive map of Güzeloluk Mosque
- Coordinates: 36°47′41″N 34°04′54″E

Architecture
- Architect: Todiri
- Type: Mosque
- Style: Ottoman architecture
- Completed: 1873; 153 years ago

Specifications
- Capacity: 400
- Length: 15 m (49 ft)
- Width: 15 m (49 ft)
- Dome: 1
- Minaret: 1
- Materials: Stone

The Güzeloluk Mosque (Turkish: Güzeloluk Camii) is a 19th-century mosque in Güzeloluk village of Mersin Province, Turkey

== Geography ==
Güzeloluk is a village in Erdemli district of Mersin Province. The mosque is situated on the road connecting Güzeloluk to west at 36°47′41″N 34°04′54″E.

== History ==
Güzeloluk Mosque is unique in Erdemli villages as being the only historical mosque. According to the inscription of the mosque it was built in 1873. But the minaret was added in 1908. Although the minaret was partially demolished in 1970 as a result of a thunderbolt, it was repaired in 1978. According to the official plaque hanged on the wall, the mosque was commissioned by the village people. But according to an academic report the mosque was commissioned by a certain Böcüoğlu İbrahim . Its architects were Ottoman Armenians named Todiri and his assistant Nikolos.

== Building ==
According to the official plaque, the total area of the mosque is 688 m^{2} (7,410 sq ft) and the square-plan interior area is 253 m^{2} (2,720 sq ft), meaning enough room for 400 prayers. The building material is stone.

Although it is an Ottoman mosque, the non-Muslim architect Todiri has introduced some church elements like unusually decorated minbar and the portal of the building.
