= Çiftepınar =

- Neighbourhood
- Location in Turkey
- Coordinates: 36°43′N 34°21′E
- Country: Turkey
- Province: Mersin
- District: Erdemli
- Elevation: 210 m (690 ft)
- Population (2022): 1,111
- Time zone: UTC+3 (TRT)
- Postal code: 33730
- Area code: 0324

Çiftepınar (literally "double fountain") is a neighbourhood in the municipality and district of Erdemli, Mersin Province, Turkey. Its population is 1,111 (2022). It lies along the west bank of Karakız creek. It was split off from Pınarbaşı, a nearby village, in 1954, and it makes up a larger conglomeration, along with both Pınarbaşı and Elvanlı, another village to the south. Its distance to Erdemli is 17 kilometres (11 mi) and to Mersin is 30 kilometres (19 mi). The town was founded by a Turkmen tribe named Keşli Türkmen. The village economy depends agriculture and especially citrus farming.
