= Hacıhalilarpaç =

- Neighbourhood
- Location in Turkey
- Coordinates: 36°44′N 34°23′E
- Country: Turkey
- Province: Mersin
- District: Erdemli
- Elevation: 170 m (560 ft)
- Population (2022): 1,047
- Time zone: UTC+3 (TRT)
- Postal code: 33730
- Area code: 0324

Hacıhalilarpaç (also called Halilarpaç) is a neighbourhood in the municipality and district of Erdemli, Mersin Province, Turkey. Its population is 1,047 (2022). The village is situated among citrus gardens in the peneplane area to the north of Çukurova (Cilicia) plains. The distance to Erdemli is 17 kilometres (11 mi) and the distance to Mersin is 40 kilometres (25 mi).

The village was founded in 1773. The name of the village refers to the founder of the village Hacı Halil. According to tradition, three brothers who were barley (Turkish: arpa) producers founded three villages including Arpaçsakarlar, a former village, now included in Greater Mersin and Arpaçbahşiş located 12 kilometres (7.5 mi) southwest of Halilarpaç and Halilarpaç. During Ottoman era, Halilarpaç was a quarter of Elvanlı, a village south of Halilarpaç. In 1934 Halilarpaç was issued from Elvanlı. Citrus (orange, lemon etc.) is the main product of the village. Tomato is also produced.
