= Fakılı, Erdemli =

Fakılı
- Neighbourhood
- Location within Turkey
- Coordinates: 36°44′N 34°12′E
- Country: Turkey
- Province: Mersin
- District: Erdemli
- Elevation: 680 m (2,230 ft)
- Population (2022): 198
- Time zone: UTC+3 (TRT)
- Postal code: 33730
- Area code: 0324

Fakılı is a neighbourhood in the municipality and district of Erdemli, Mersin Province, Turkey. Its population is 198 (2022). It is situated in the forests of the Toros Mountains. It is located on the eastern side of the Alata River valley opposite to Koramşalı at the western side of the valley. The distance to Erdemli is 24 kilometres (15 mi) and 60 kilometres (37 mi) to Mersin. The village is named after Fakih, who founded the village in the 1520s. The neighborhood's main economic activity is farming. Tomato, cucumber, pomegranate, beans and grapes are the main crops.
