= Elbeyli (disambiguation) =

Elbeyli is a district of Kilis Province, Turkey.

Elbeyli may also refer to the following places in Turkey:

- Elbeyli, İznik, a town in İznik district of Bursa Province
- Elbeyli, Erdemli, a village in Erdemli district of Mersin Province
- Elbeyli, Mut, a village in Mut district of Mersin Province
