= Arslanlı =

Arslanlı (literally "(place) with lions") is a Turkish place name that may refer to the following places in Turkey:

- Arslanlı, Erdemli, a village in the district of Erdemli, Mersin Province
- Arslanlı, Kozan, a village in the district of Kozan, Adana Province
- Arslanlı, Taşköprü, a village
