= Üçtepe, Erdemli =

Üçtepe
- Neighbourhood
- Location in Turkey
- Coordinates: 36°35′N 34°14′E
- Country: Turkey
- Province: Mersin
- District: Erdemli
- Elevation: 225 m (738 ft)
- Population (2022): 1,387
- Time zone: UTC+3 (TRT)
- Postal code: 33730
- Area code: 0324

Üçtepe (literally “three hills”) is a neighbourhood in the municipality and district of Erdemli, Mersin Province, Turkey. Its population is 1,387 (2022). It is situated to the north of Kocahasanlı, a town in Erdemli district. Distance to Mediterranean Sea side is 3 kilometres (1.9 mi), to Erdemli is 8 kilometres (5.0 mi) and to Mersin is 44 kilometres (27 mi). Up to 1987 the village was a remote quarter of Kocahasanlı and the population is composed of Yörüks who are nomadic Turkmens just like the residents of Kocahasanlı. The main economic activity of the village is greenhouse agriculture.
