= Karacaoğlan (disambiguation) =

Karacaoğlan was a 17th-century Turkic folk poet.

It may also refer to:

- Karacaoğlan River, river in southern Turkey
- Karacaoğlan, Kargı, village in Kargı District, Çorum Province, Turkey
- Karacaoğlan, Mut, village in Mut District, Mersin Province, Turkey
