= Alata =

Alata may refer to:

== Places ==
- Alata, Corse-du-Sud, France
- Alata, Mali
- Alata Research Institute of Horticulture, a research institute in Mersin Province, Turkey

== Fictional Characters ==
- Alata, a character from Tensou Sentai Goseiger
