= Kızılen =

- Neighbourhood
- Location in Turkey
- Coordinates: 36°42′N 34°05′E
- Country: Turkey
- Province: Mersin
- District: Erdemli
- Elevation: 1,170 m (3,840 ft)
- Population (2022): 482
- Time zone: UTC+3 (TRT)
- Postal code: 33730
- Area code: 0324

Kızılen is a neighbourhood in the municipality and district of Erdemli, Mersin Province, Turkey. Its population is 482 (2022). It is situated in the valley of a dry river bed. Its distance to Erdemli is 35 kilometres (22 mi) and to Mersin is 70 kilometres (43 mi). There are traces of ancient civilizations around the village. The village was founded by a Turkmen tribe from Taşkale of Karaman Province. In the early years of the Turkish Republic Kızılen was a neighbourhood of Küstülü, another village to the south east. But in 1961 it gained its legal status as a village. The main economic activity is agriculture. Tomato, cucumber, bean as well as fruits like apple, peach and cherry are among the crops harvested in the village.
