= 1961–62 Mersin İdmanyurdu season =

Mersin İdmanyurdu
1961–62 season
- President: Mehmet Karamehmet
- Stadium: Mersin, Turkey
- Turkey Amateur League: Champions
- Turkish Cup: not played

Mersin İdmanyurdu (also Mersin İdman Yurdu, Mersin İY, or MİY) Sports Club; located in Mersin, east Mediterranean coast of Turkey in 1961–62. Mersin İdmanyurdu (MİY) football team.

== Information on previous seasons ==
- 1951: Mersin İdmanyurdu participated in "Türkiye Futbol Birincilikleri" (Turkey Football Championships) and took place in İçel Group with Adana Demirspor, Adana İdmanyurdu and Karagücü. Games were played on 12–17 May 1951. Group leaders participated in finals in Balıkesir starting from 24 May 1951.
- 1953: Mersin İdmanyurdu participated in "Türkiye Futbol Birincilikleri" (Turkey Football Championships). MİY became the leader of Mersin Group. Finals were played in Adana and Mersin on 17, 18 and 20 May 1953. On 15 May, MİY played against Bursa Merinosspor in Adana. In other leg Havagücü and Göztepe played. The winner of the Adana group played the winner of the Mersin group.
- 28 Nov 1954 - Mersin İdmanyurdu-Mersinspor: 0-0. Mersin League game.
- 19 Oct 1958 - Mersin İdmanyurdu-Tarsus Yıldırımspor: 1–0. Mersin League game.
- 24.02.1960 - Army team's preparation game: Army team- MİY: 4–0. Mersin. Army team: Sabih, Abdullah, Şehmuz, Ali (Tuncay), Süreyya, Mustafa Çam, Turhan, Can (Rıza), K.Ahmet, Hüseyin, Aydın. Goals: Turhan, K.Ahmet (first half), Aydın, Hüseyin.
- 9 Jun 1960 - MİY played "Türkiye Futbol Birincilikleri" (Turkey Football Championships) group matches with Havagücü. The next day, on 11 May, Muhafızgücü beat MİY 1–0. 12 May Urfa Gençlikspor-Mersin İdmanyurdu: 2–1.
- 5 Mar 1961 - Çukurova İdmanyurdu-Konya İdmanyurdu: 4–0.
- 28.02.1961 - ÇİY- Konya İdmanyurdu: - Previous games: ÇİY-KİY: 2–4. ÇİY-Konya G.Bir: 2–0. ÇİY-Nevşehir L.S.: 4–0. ÇİY-Nevşehir Gü.: 4–0. ÇİY: Ad. D. spor: 1–3.

== 1961–62 season ==
=== Preparation games ===
- 24 Feb 1962 - Army Team beat MİY 4–0 in a preparation game in Mersin.

=== Regional amateur league participation ===
Mersin League games (12.12.1961) and regional games (24.04.1962): ÇİY-Demirspor: 1-1. ÇİY-İçelspor:0-0. ÇİY-Yolspor: 3–1. ÇİY-Berzanspor: 4–0. ÇİY-Türkocağı: 3–1. ÇİY-Tarsus İdmanyurdu: 4–1. ÇİY-İtilspor: 2–1. ÇİY-Meriçspor: 1-1. ÇİY-Demirspor: 3–1. ÇİY-Demirspor: 3–0. ÇİY-Adana Kocavezir:

=== Amateur football championship group stage ===
1962 - MİY played "Türkiye Futbol Birincilikleri" (Turkey Football Championships) group matches.

- On the first day (01.06.1962) ÇİY-Urfa Tektekspor: 5–0.
- In Mersin on the second day (2 June) Çukurova İdmanyurdu-Sivas Karagücü: 1–0.
- On the last day (3 June), Çukurova İdmanyurdu-Diclespor: 1-1. Çukurova İdmanyurdu became leader of the Mersin group and became eligible to play finals in Balıkesir.

=== Amateur football championship finals ===
Finals started on June 8. After the final games İzmir Karagücü became the champions. Eskişehir Şekerspor were runners-up. ÇİY took the third place.

place	team	games				goals		points	games		
place	team	P	W	D	L	F	A	points	F-A	#	plc
1	İzmir Karagücü	3	2	1	0	5	2	5	1-3		
2	Eskişehir Şekerspor	3	1	1	1	4	4	3	-		
3	Çukurova İdmanyurdu	3	1	0	2	4	5	2			
4	Trabzon İdmanocağı	3	1	0	2	1	3	2	0-1		

- 10.06.1962 - Trabzon İdmanocağı-ÇİY: 1–0. Referee: Muvahhit Afir. Trabzon İdmanocağı: Ergin, Haydar, Erdoğan, Suat, Kenan, Osman, Cemalettin, Zekai, Nevzat, Faruk, Abdurrahman. Goal: Suat 78'. ÇİY: Doğan, Nevzat, Yahya, Emin, Ahmet, Oktay, Erol, Selahattini Teoman, Muammer, Hüseyin. In the other game same day, Eskişehir Şekerspor: 1 İzmir Karagücü: 1.

== 1961–62 squad ==
no	nat	name	birth	born	pos	apps	Goal	Booked	Sent off (straight red)	notes

Rızıkallah, Nevzat, Ergin, Demir, Ahmet, Oktay, Selahattin, Uğur, Abdi, Alp, Hüseyin.

Midfield player Selahattin was capped in the Amateur National Team for the 4th Mediterranean Games.

== See also ==
- Football in Turkey
