= Üçayaklı ruins =

Villa rustica in Mersin Province, Turkey

Üçayaklı
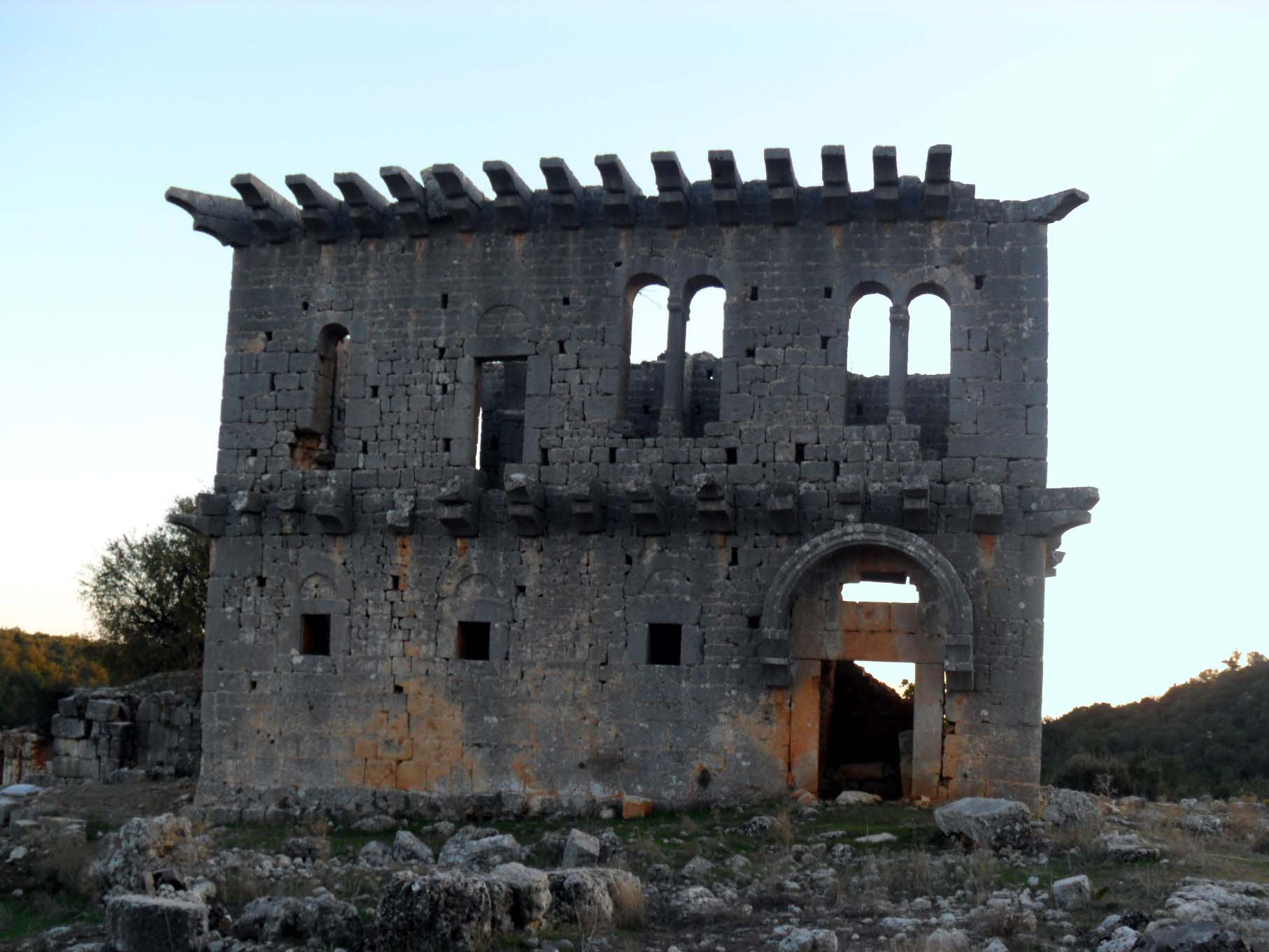
- Villa rustica from the east

- Location within Turkey
- 36°39′40″N 34°06′34″E
- Type: Villa rustica
- Periods: early Byzantine Empire
- Location: Erdemli, Mersin Province, Turkey
- Region: Mediterranean Region

Site notes
- Condition: Partially demolished
- Owner: Ministry of Culture and Tourism

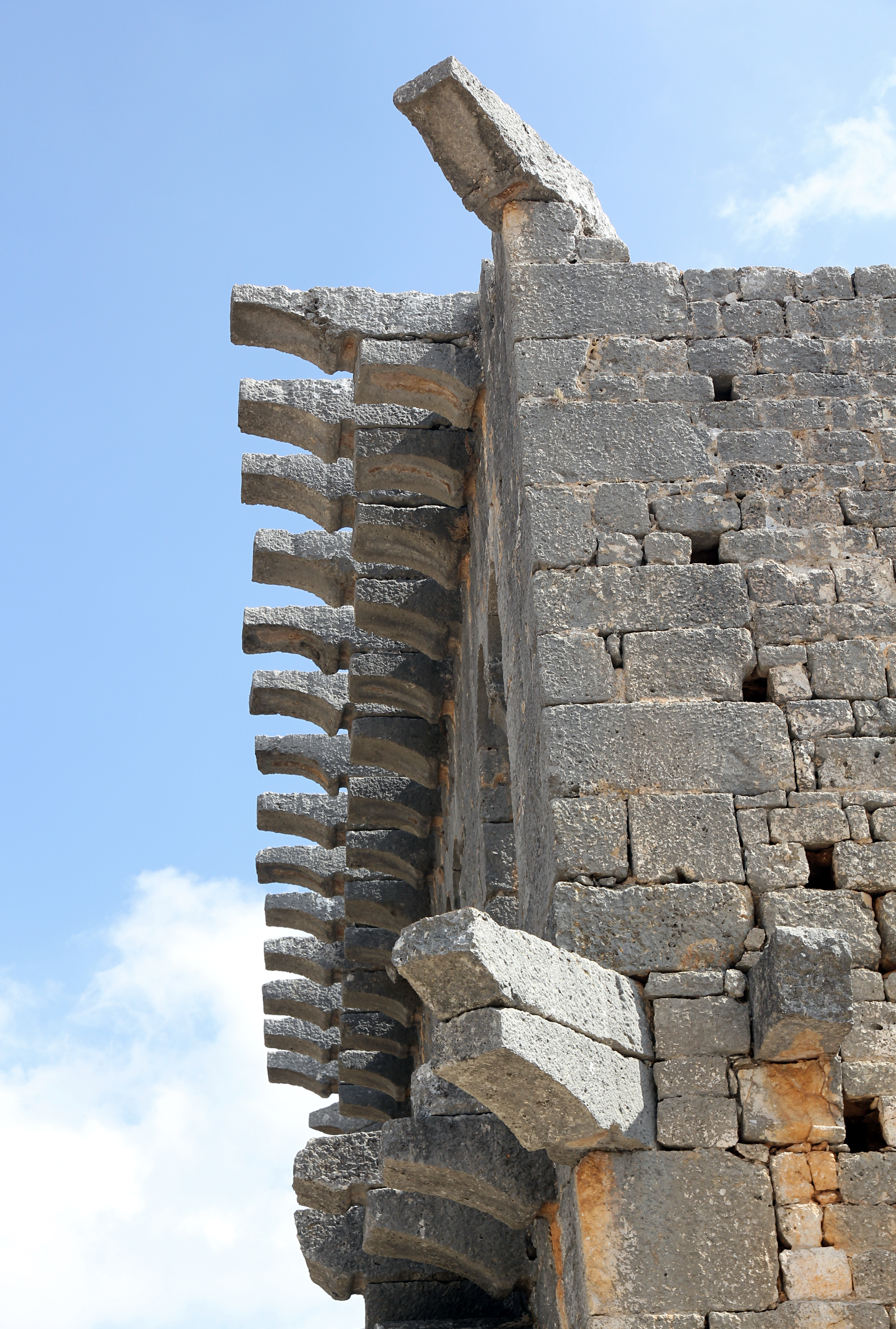

The Üçayaklı ruins are a Byzantine-era archaeological site in Mersin Province, Turkey.

== Geography ==
Üçayaklı ruins are on the plateau at the south of Toros Mountains with an altitude of 915 metres (3,002 ft) between two Turkmen villages named Küstülü and Hüsametli in Erdemli ilçe (district) of Mersin Province. Although the site is in the Mediterranean Region of Turkey, bird's flight distance to Mediterranean coast is 20 kilometres (12 mi) and highway distance to the main highway D.400 at the coast is 25 kilometres (16 mi). The total distance to Erdemli is about 30 kilometres (19 mi) and to Mersin is about 65 kilometres (40 mi).

== The ruins ==
The ruins are composed of two houses and a cistern. The big house is a two or three-storey building with balconies and wide windows on the second floor. The building was a villa rustica during the Byzantine Empire period. The stone walls, interior coving and blind vaults as well as corbels to support the balconies survive. But the ceiling and floor structures which were wooden have been demolished. There is a wide downspout which leads the rain water to a cistern at the back of the house. (In the Mediterranean area such cisterns were common during the Roman times). One of the balconies was a toilet room with sewage drain. There is also a smaller house at the back which was probably a service building of the villa.
