= Kuşluca =

Kuşluca can refer to:

- Kuşluca, Erdemli
- Kuşluca, Karaçoban
