= Lake Karakız =

Artificial pond in Turkey

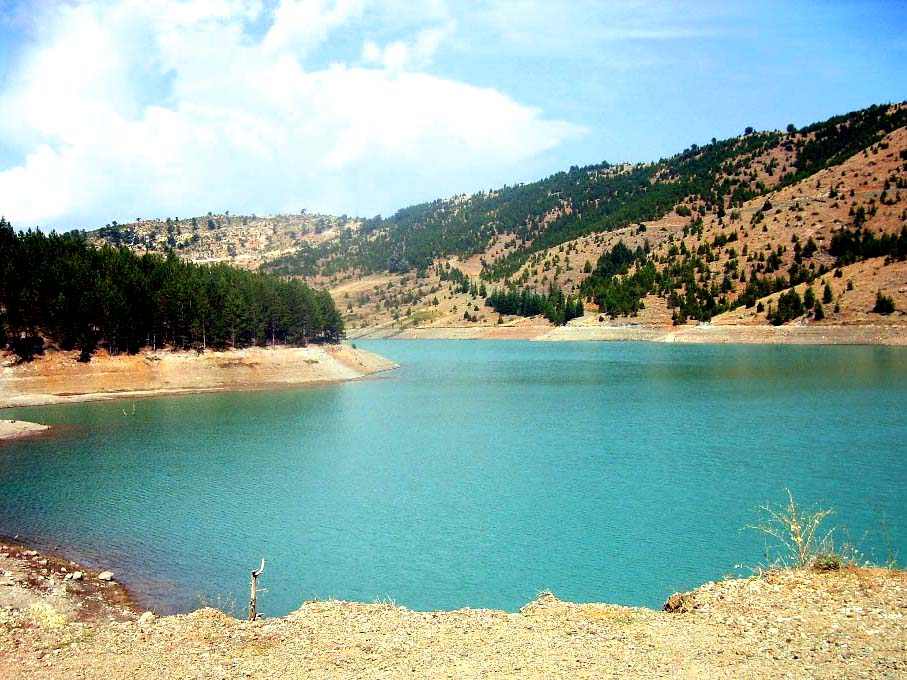

- Location within Turkey
- Location: Mersin Province, Turkey
- Coordinates: 36°51′N 34°13′E
- Primary inflows: Karakız Creek
- Primary outflows: Tömük Creek
- Built: 1998
- Max. length: 1,500 m (4,900 ft)
- Water volume: 3,240,000 m^{3} (114,000,000 cu ft)
- Surface elevation: 1,530 m (5,020 ft)

Karakız Lake (Turkish: Karakız Göleti) is an artificial pond in Mersin Province, Turkey.

== Geography ==
The lake was formed in 1998. It is on Toros Mountains in the rural area of Erdemli district. Its main water source is Karakız Creek. It is at the east of the village Hacıalanı which actually is a yayla (summer resort). Distance to Erdemli is 49 kilometres (30 mi) and to Mersin is 65 kilometres (40 mi) . The bird’s flight distance to Mediterranean coast is 27 kilometres (17 mi). The longer dimension of the lake which is in north to south direction is about 1,500 metres (4,900 ft). The surface altitude is about 1,530 metres (5,020 ft). The total water capacity is 3,240,000 cubic metres (114,000,000 cu ft). The lake discharges to Tömük Creek.

== Uses ==
The lake is used for irrigation. It is also a popular picnic and fishing area. In the future it may further be used for sports. Mersin Union of Industrialists proposes to establish a winter sports complex around the lake.
