= İlemin =

- Neighbourhood
- Location in Turkey
- Coordinates: 36°44′N 34°19′E
- Country: Turkey
- Province: Mersin
- District: Erdemli
- Elevation: 635 m (2,083 ft)
- Population (2022): 666
- Time zone: UTC+3 (TRT)
- Postal code: 33730
- Area code: 0324

İlemin is a neighbourhood in the municipality and district of Erdemli, Mersin Province, Turkey. Its population is 666 (2022). The distance to Erdemli is 24 kilometres (15 mi) and the distance to Mersin's city centre is 37 kilometres (23 mi).
