= Aydınlar, Erdemli =

Aydınlar Avgadı
- Neighbourhood
- Location in Turkey
- Coordinates: 36°46′N 34°07′E
- Country: Turkey
- Province: Mersin
- District: Erdemli
- Elevation: 1,340 m (4,400 ft)
- Population (2022): 354
- Time zone: UTC+3 (TRT)
- Postal code: 33730
- Area code: 0324

Aydınlar (formerly Avgadı) is a neighbourhood in the municipality and district of Erdemli, Mersin Province, Turkey. Its population is 354 (2022). It is situated in the Taurus Mountains. It is located 33 kilometres (21 mi) away from Erdemli and 69 kilometres (43 mi) away from Mersin. There are cedar and turpentine forests around the village and the former name of the village may refer to game animals ("av" in Turkish means hunt). The major economic activity is agriculture. Apple, cherry and cereals are produced. Animal breeding is another activity.
