= Sarıyer, Erdemli =

Sarıyer
- Neighbourhood
- Location in Turkey
- Coordinates: 36°43′N 34°24′E
- Country: Turkey
- Province: Mersin
- District: Erdemli
- Elevation: 160 m (520 ft)
- Population (2022): 618
- Time zone: UTC+3 (TRT)
- Postal code: 33730
- Area code: 0324

Sarıyer (also called Sarıyar) is a neighbourhood in the municipality and district of Erdemli, Mersin Province, Turkey. Its population is 618 (2022). It is situated in the peneplane area to the south of the Toros Mountains. Its distance to Erdemli is 17 kilometres (11 mi) and to Mersin is 27 kilometres (17 mi). There are historical ruins around the village. The settlement was founded by the Yörüks (once-nomadic Turkmens from Alanya, west). Up to 1950 it was a part of Dağlı a village to the northeast of Sarıyer. Then it gained its legal entity as a village. Its original name was Sarıyar (literally "yellow cliff") referring to cliffs on both sides of the village. The villages' main economic activity is farming with Tomatoes being the main crop. Citrus, locust bean and olive are also produced. Beekeeping is another profitable activity.
