= Çerçili =

- Neighbourhood
- Location in Turkey
- Coordinates: 36°46′N 34°10′E
- Country: Turkey
- Province: Mersin
- District: Erdemli
- Elevation: 900 m (3,000 ft)
- Population (2022): 524
- Time zone: UTC+3 (TRT)
- Postal code: 33730
- Area code: 0324

Çerçili (formerly Ali) is a neighbourhood in the municipality and district of Erdemli, Mersin Province, Turkey. Its population is 524 (2022). It is situated in the Taurus Mountains. The distance to Erdemli is 30 kilometres (19 mi) and to Mersin is 66 kilometres (41 mi). The major economic activity is agriculture. Animal breeding is another activity.
