= Çamlı, Erdemli =

Çamlı
- Neighbourhood
- Location in Turkey
- Coordinates: 36°45′N 34°12′E
- Country: Turkey
- Province: Mersin
- District: Erdemli
- Elevation: 930 m (3,050 ft)
- Population (2022): 477
- Time zone: UTC+3 (TRT)
- Postal code: 33730
- Area code: 0324

Çamlı is a neighbourhood in the municipality and district of Erdemli, Mersin Province, Turkey. Its population is 477 (2022). It is situated to the east of Alata creek valley. Its distance to Erdemli is 25 kilometres (16 mi) and to Mersin is 60 kilometres (37 mi). There are traces of ancient civilizations around the village, but the village was founded in 1960 by merging two hamlets named Ohut and Firzin. The main economic activity is agriculture, and various vegetables are produced.
