= Sarıkaya, Erdemli =

Sarıkaya
- Neighbourhood
- Location within Turkey
- Coordinates: 36°45′40″N 34°06′45″E
- Country: Turkey
- Province: Mersin
- District: Erdemli
- Elevation: 1,330 m (4,360 ft)
- Population (2022): 655
- Time zone: UTC+3 (TRT)
- Postal code: 33730
- Area code: 0324

Sarıkaya ("yellow-rock", also called Sarıcakaya, "yellowish rock")) is a neighbourhood in the municipality and district of Erdemli, Mersin Province, Turkey. Its population is 655 (2022). Its distance to Erdemli is 33 kilometres (21 mi) and to Mersin is 69 kilometres (43 mi). The village is situated in the southern slopes of the Toros Mountains and in summers it is used as a summer resort, a so called yayla. There are cedar forests around the village. The village was founded by a Turkmen tribe from Karaman in the 18th century. Initially, they had founded another village now called Yanıkköy (“burnt village”); but for reasons unknown, they had a clash with other Turkmen who had previously settled around and during the clashes Yanıkköy was burned down. Sarıcakaya was their next home. The main economic activity of the village is animal breeding. Fruits like cherry, apple and peach are also produced.
