= Hacıalanı, Erdemli =

Hacıalanı
- Neighbourhood
- Location in Turkey
- Coordinates: 36°50′N 34°11′E
- Country: Turkey
- Province: Mersin
- District: Erdemli
- Elevation: 1,550 m (5,090 ft)
- Population (2022): 181
- Time zone: UTC+3 (TRT)
- Postal code: 33730
- Area code: 0324

Hacıalanı is a neighbourhood in the municipality and district of Erdemli, Mersin Province, Turkey. Its population is 181 (2022). The village is situated in the peneplane area to the south of the Toros Mountains. The distance to Erdemli is 43 kilometres (27 mi) and the distance to Mersin is 70 kilometres (43 mi).

Because the village is actually a yayla (summer resort) the population sharply increases during the summer to up to 3000. The artificial lake Karakız is to the east of the village. The touristic potential of the village with the Roman ruins as well as cedar forests is promising. But at the present tourism plays no important role in village economy. Its main economic activity is farming, with tomato, cherry, peach, apple and beans being the main crops. Animal breeding is another activity.
