= Alata River =

River in Turkey

Alata River (Turkish: Alata çayı) is small river in Erdemli ilçe (district) of Mersin Province, Turkey

== Geography ==
The headwaters are around the village of Toros (Küçüksorgun) in the Toros Mountains at an elevation of about 1,500 metres (4,900 ft). In the upper reaches it is usually called Sorgun Creek (Turkish: Sorgun Çayı). Flowing to south for 90 kilometres (56 mi), it empties into the Mediterranean Sea at 36°36′13″N 34°19′10″E. Presently its estuary is in the urban fabric of Erdemli.

== History ==
According to the 1892 map drawn by Vital Cuinet and the 1897-salname (provincial annal) of Adana, Alata was the border line between Mersin and İçil districts (which were later merged with). At the estuary there was an active commercial pier. According to researcher Mehmet Mazak, during 1880-1920 term, Alata pier was the only Mediterranean pier between Mersin and Taşucu piers. Presently there is only a small fishing pier.

== Hydroelectric power plant ==
A dam on the Alata River under the supervision of Turkish State Hydraulic Works is under construction. The dam will serve for irrigation as well as energy production. The elevation of the rockfill dam is 1,290 metres (4,230 ft). 52410 decare of land will be irrigated and 37678 GW-hour of electric energy will be produced.
