= Evdilek, Erdemli =

Evdilek
- Neighbourhood
- Location in Turkey
- Coordinates: 36°52′N 33°58′E
- Country: Turkey
- Province: Mersin
- District: Erdemli
- Elevation: 1,660 m (5,450 ft)
- Population (2022): 107
- Time zone: UTC+3 (TRT)
- Postal code: 33730
- Area code: 0324

Evdilek is a neighbourhood in the municipality and district of Erdemli, Mersin Province, Turkey. Its population is 107 (2022). The remote village is situated in the Taurus Mountains. The village's distance to Erdemli is 80 kilometres (50 mi) and to Mersin is 116 kilometres (72 mi). Evdilek is a high altitude village, and until recently, it was only a yayla which was unpopulated during the winters. In 2006, it was declared a village, but its winter population remains low. The main economic activity of Evdilek is animal breeding, but fruit production is on the rise.
