= Tozlu, Erdemli =

Village in Erdemli, Turkey

Tozlu
- Neighbourhood
- Location in Turkey
- Coordinates: 36°48′N 34°07′E
- Country: Turkey
- Province: Mersin
- District: Erdemli
- Elevation: 1,460 m (4,790 ft)
- Population (2022): 142
- Time zone: UTC+3 (TRT)
- Postal code: 33730
- Area code: 0324

Tozlu is a neighbourhood in the municipality and district of Erdemli, Mersin Province, Turkey. Its population is 142 (2022). Its distance to Erdemli is 44 kilometres (27 mi) and 80 kilometres (50 mi) to Mersin. The village is situated in the Toros Mountains and in the summer it is used as a summer resort, a so called yayla. During summers the population may increase up to 1000. The economy of the permanent settlers depends on farming. Apple, plum and cherry are the main crops.
