= İçil Sanjak =

Sanjak of the Ottoman Empire

İçil was the name of a sanjak (a former administrative unit until 1921) in Turkey and the Ottoman Empire.

== Nomenclature ==
During the Ottoman Empire, İçil was a sanjak (an administrative unit smaller than vilayet and larger than kaza) in south Turkey. It roughly corresponded to Cilicia Trachaea of the antiquity. İçil literally means "inner territory". Although it borders the Mediterranean Sea, the Toros Mountains, which are mostly impassable (except for the Sertavul Pass), may be the reason of the name, was first documented in the 12th century by Sejukid Turks. They used the name only for the Göksu River valley. But soon it became the name of a wider territory. According to an official map drawn by Vital Cuinet the east border of İçil was Alata River and the west border was an unidentified river just to the east of Alanya (may be Dim River). The northern border followed the summit line of the mountains.

== Kazas ==
According to salname (annual) of Adana Vilayet, there were six kazas (districts, now called ilçe) in the sanjak; namely, Anamur, Ermenek, Gülnar, Karataş, Mut, and Silifke. Anamur was the current Anamur and Bozyazı ilçes (districts) of Mersin Province with the addition of Selinti (Gazipaşa) nahiye (a smaller unit, now an ilçe in Antalya Province); Ermenek, the capital of the sanjak till 1871 was the current Ermenek ilçe of Karaman Province; Gülnar was the current Gülnar and Aydıncık ilçes of Mersin Province; Karataş was the current Erdemli ilçe of Mersin Province; Mut was the current Mut ilçe of Mersin Province and Silifke was the current Silifke ilçe of Mersin Province. Except for Gazipaşa and Ermenek İçil was the west part of the current Mersin Province. As a result of administrative reforms, Ermenek was separated from the sanjak in 1919 and Gazipaşa in 1926.

== Republican era ==
During the Republican era, the second i in İçil underwent a change and İçil became İçel. In the early years of the Republic, İçel was an il (province) and its capital was Silifke. But in 1933, the İçel İl and Mersin İl (to the east) were merged. İçel was kept as the name of the whole il. But the capital of the province was Mersin. In 2002, the name of İçel was replaced with that of Mersin.
