= Doğusandal =

- Neighbourhood
- Location in Turkey
- Coordinates: 36°46′N 34°24′E
- Country: Turkey
- Province: Mersin
- District: Erdemli
- Elevation: 330 m (1,080 ft)
- Population (2022): 267
- Time zone: UTC+3 (TRT)
- Postal code: 33730
- Area code: 0324

Doğusandal (meaning "East sandalwood" named after Santalum album, a common tree) is a neighbourhood in the municipality and district of Erdemli, Mersin Province, Turkey. Its population is 267 (2022). It is situated in the lower slopes of the Toros Mountains. Its distance to Erdemli is 25 kilometres (16 mi) and to Mersin is 30 kilometres (19 mi). There are ruins of Byzantine settlements around the village, however the village was founded about four centuries ago. The main agricultural crops grown in the village are citrus, olive and tomato.
