= Çatıören =

Archaeological site in Mersin Province, Turkey

Coordinates: 36°31′23″N 34°07′24″E

Çatıören is an archaeological site in Mersin Province, Turkey.

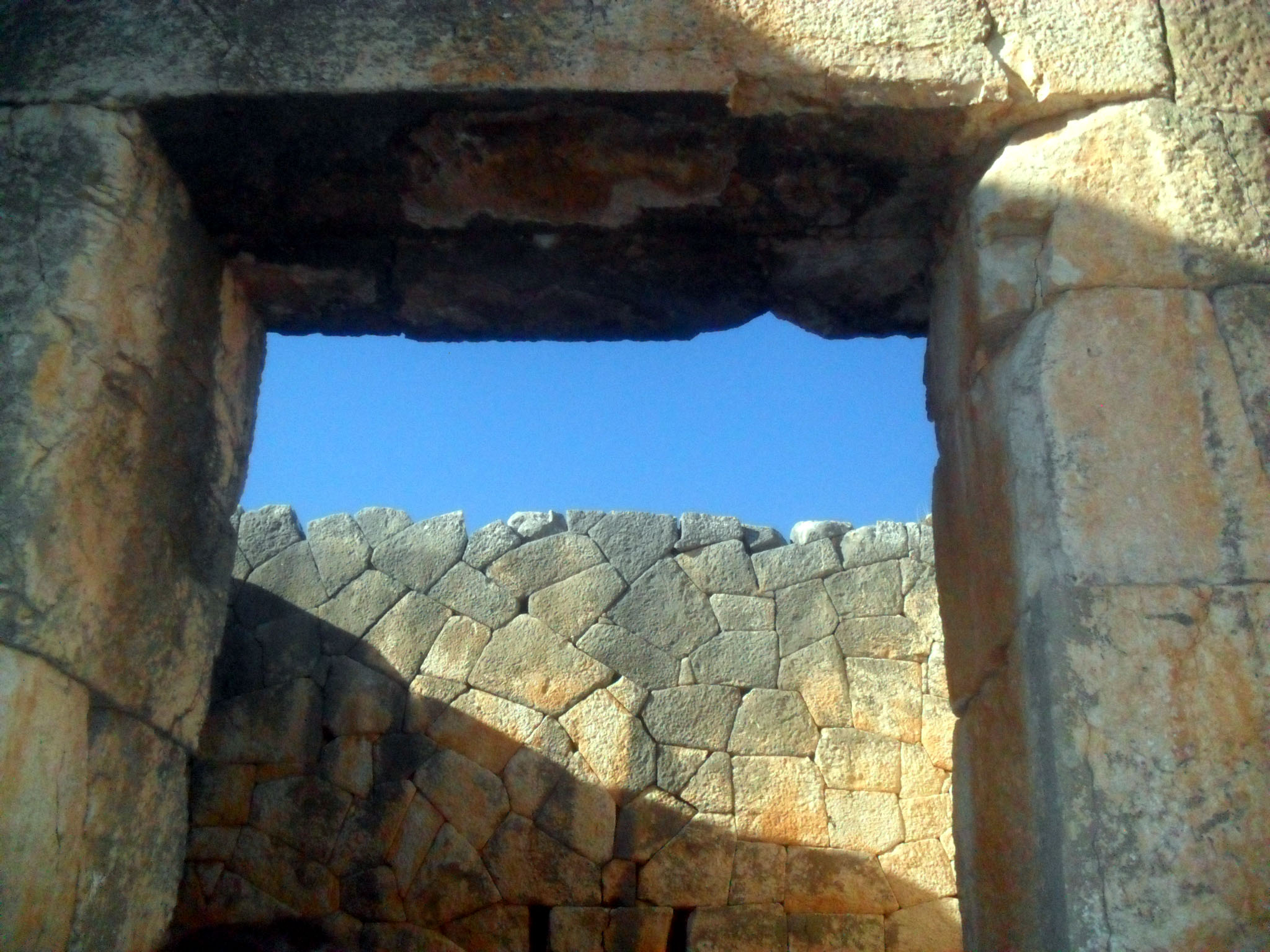
Temple of Hermes in Çatıören

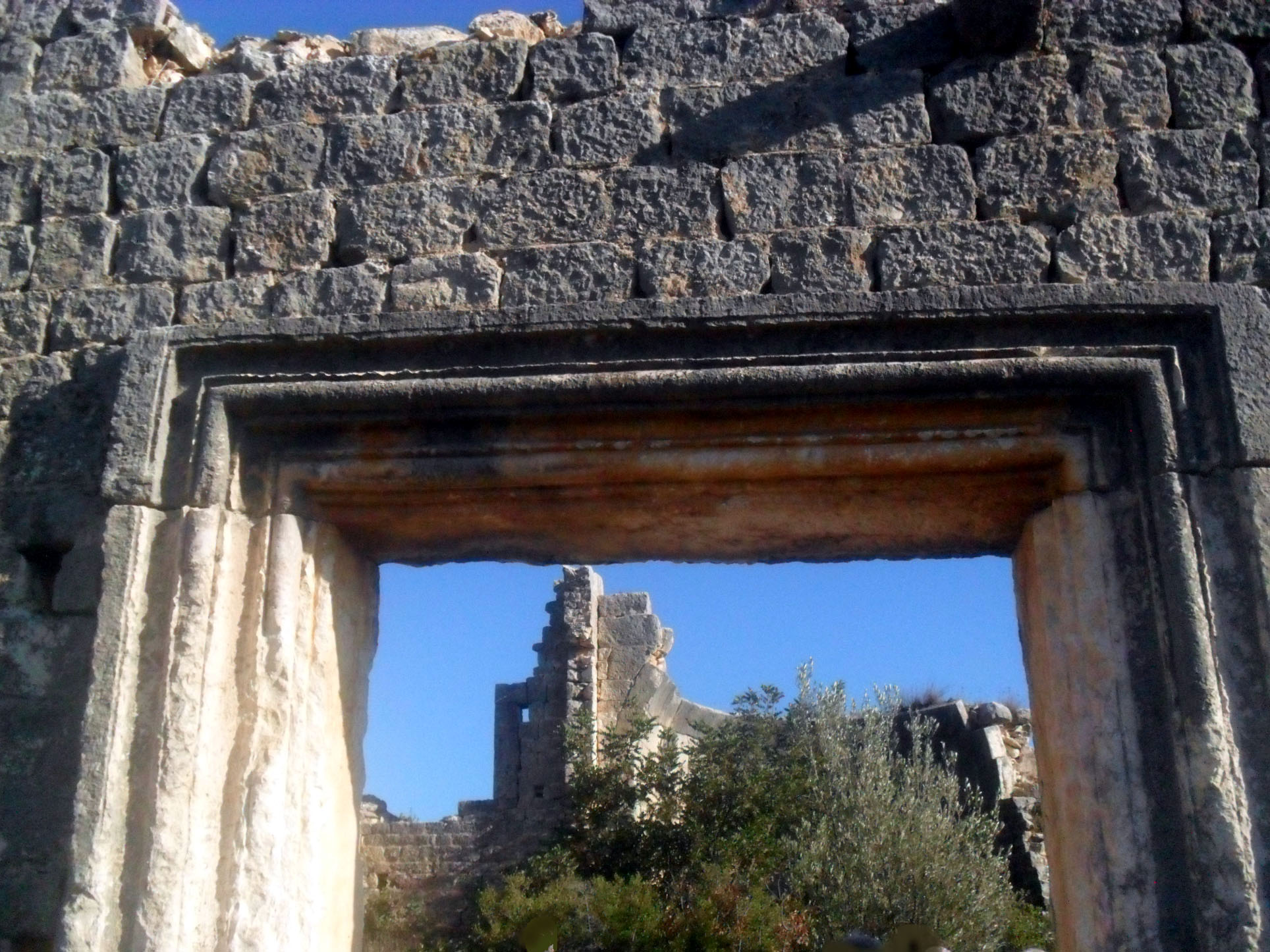
Çatıören church

== Geography ==
The site is situated in the rural area of Erdemli district of Mersin Province. Its distance to Erdemli is about 25 kilometres (16 mi) and to Mersin is 62 kilometres (39 mi). Visitors from Mersin follow Turkish state road D.400 and a village road from the town of Ayaş to north. The ruins are to the west of the road.

== History ==
Due to scarcity of documents, the history of the site has not been studied and the original name of the site is unknown. The Turkish name Çatıören means "roof-ruin". But the presence of a Hellenistic temple and polygonal masonry imply that the site was originally a Hellenistic site. It may be a 1st or 2nd century BC temple. The church however is probably a 6th-century Byzantine building. It seems, like many other similar sites the settlement continued uninterrupted from the Hellenistic to Byzantine age.

== The ruins ==
Although the ruins are scattered around, only three building are partially standing. The building just next to the road is thought to be an early Byzantine church. Two walls as well as the apse are standing. The Hellenistic temple is further to west and located on a hill. It is a temple of Hermes, the Greek god of transitions. Partially rock carved, four walls and a staircase are standing. On the wall there is a relief of Caduceus. There is another building which was probably a tower to the south of the temple. There are also ruins of cisterns, sepulchers etc. around.
