= Yağda, Erdemli =

Yağda
- Neighbourhood
- Location in Turkey
- Coordinates: 36°44′N 34°03′E
- Country: Turkey
- Province: Mersin
- District: Erdemli
- Elevation: 1,310 m (4,300 ft)
- Population (2022): 362
- Time zone: UTC+3 (TRT)
- Postal code: 33730
- Area code: 0324

Yağda is a neighbourhood in the municipality and district of Erdemli, Mersin Province, Turkey. Its population is 362 (2022). It is situated in the peneplain area of the Taurus Mountains. The distance to the town of Erdemli is 47 kilometres (29 mi), and to the port of Mersin, the distance is 83 kilometres (52 mi). The citrus groves around the village provide kindling and the village is named after kindling oil (Yağ means oil in Turkish). The main economic activity is farming, and a variety of fruits and vegetables are produced.
