= Kösbucağı =

- Neighbourhood
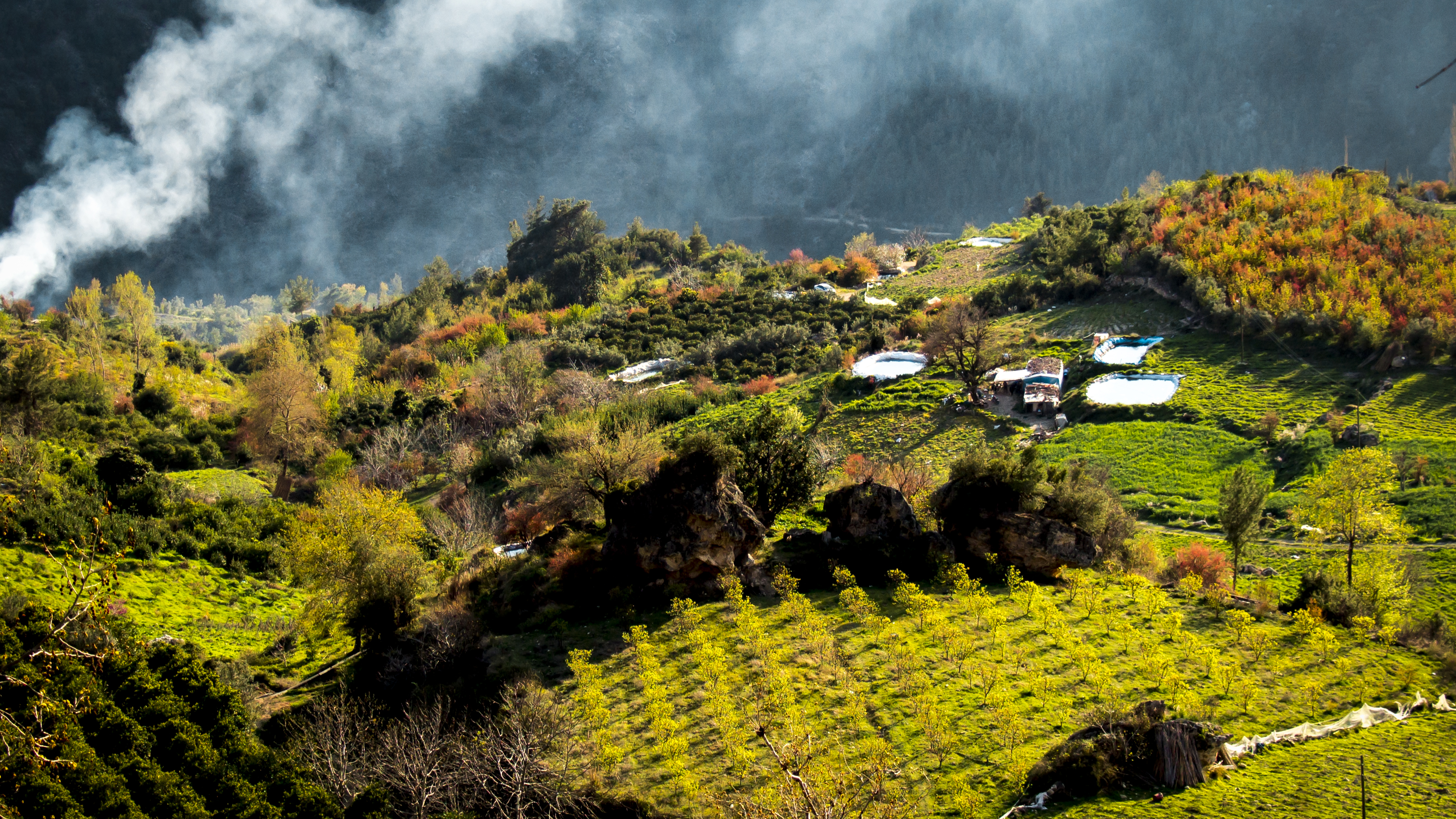

- Location within Turkey
- Coordinates: 36°41′N 34°15′E
- Country: Turkey
- Province: Mersin
- District: Erdemli
- Elevation: 525 m (1,722 ft)
- Population (2022): 1,933
- Time zone: UTC+3 (TRT)
- Postal code: 33730
- Area code: 0324

Kösbucağı is a neighbourhood in the municipality and district of Erdemli, Mersin Province, Turkey. Its population is 1,933 (2022). It is a dispersed mountain village situated in forests. The distance to Erdemli is about 12 kilometres (7.5 mi) and 48 kilometres (30 mi) to Mersin. There are Roman and Byzantine ruins (including a bridge) around the village. However, the inhabitants are of Turkmen origin. The main economic activity of the village is farming. Citrus, various fruits and vegetables are produced. There is also a poultry farm in the village. Some village residents work in chromium mines next to the village.
