= Gücüş =

Güçüş
- Neighbourhood
- Location in Turkey
- Coordinates: 36°38′30″N 34°12′10″E
- Country: Turkey
- Province: Mersin
- District: Erdemli
- Elevation: 640 m (2,100 ft)
- Population (2022): 269
- Time zone: UTC+3 (TRT)
- Postal code: 33730
- Area code: 0324

Güçüş is a neighbourhood in the municipality and district of Erdemli, Mersin Province, Turkey. Its population is 269 (2022). It is situated in the forests of the Toros Mountains to the east of the Alata creek canyon. The distance to Erdemli is 14 kilometres (8.7 mi) and 50 kilometres (31 mi) to Mersin. The village is a Turkmen village. It was named after the phrase Güç iş meaning "Hard work", referring to the hardships encountered during the foundation of the village. The main economic activity of the village is farming. Tomato and cucumber are among the more important crops of the village. Olive production is on the rise.
