= Pınarbaşı, Erdemli =

Pınarbaşı
- Neighbourhood
- Location in Turkey
- Coordinates: 36°42′15″N 34°21′45″E
- Country: Turkey
- Province: Mersin
- District: Erdemli
- Elevation: 300 m (980 ft)
- Population (2022): 909
- Time zone: UTC+3 (TRT)
- Postal code: 33730
- Area code: 0324

Pınarbaşı is a neighbourhood in the municipality and district of Erdemli, Mersin Province, Turkey. Its population is 909 (2022). It is almost merged with Elvanlı, another village to the south. The distance to Erdemli is 18 kilometres (11 mi) and 31 kilometres (19 mi) to Mersin. The village was founded in 1865 as a result of Ottoman policy of Turkmen placement. The former name of the village was Çakalkeşli. In 1954, a neighbourhood was issued from the village and the village was named as Pınarbaşı, referring to the water resources of the village. The village's economy depends on fresh water fishing and citrus farming.
