= Şahna, Erdemli =

Şahna
- Neighbourhood
- Location in Turkey
- Coordinates: 36°51′N 34°19′E
- Country: Turkey
- Province: Mersin
- District: Erdemli
- Elevation: 975 m (3,199 ft)
- Population (2022): 260
- Time zone: UTC+3 (TRT)
- Postal code: 33730
- Area code: 0324

Şahna is a neighbourhood in the municipality and district of Erdemli, Mersin Province, Turkey. Its population is 260 (2022). The village is situated in the peneplane area to the north of Çukurova (Cilicia) plains. The distance to Erdemli is 43 kilometres (27 mi) and the distance to Mersin is 51 kilometres (32 mi). According to village dwellers, the original name of the village was Şahane yer ("Wonderful place") referring to the beautiful forest scenery around the village. It was founded 200 years ago by Yörüks (then nomadic Turkmen people) from Alanya. A part of the village named Üzümlü recently issued from the village. Main economic activities in the village are farming and animal breeding. Tomato, cucumber, peach, pear and grapes are the major crops.
