= Kayacı =

- Neighbourhood
- Location in Turkey
- Coordinates: 36°39′N 34°12′E
- Country: Turkey
- Province: Mersin
- District: Erdemli
- Elevation: 660 m (2,170 ft)
- Population (2022): 1,223
- Time zone: UTC+3 (TRT)
- Postal code: 33730
- Area code: 0324

Kayacı is a neighbourhood in the municipality and district of Erdemli, Mersin Province, Turkey. Its population is 1,223 (2022). The distance to Erdemli is 10 kilometres (6.2 mi) and to Mersin is 46 kilometres (29 mi). The village is situated on the lower slopes of the Toros Mountains.

There are Roman ruins around the village and a few kilometer west of the village there is a valley named after the village (Turkish: Kayacı vadisi) which is used as a picnic spot by Mersin citizens.
