= Harfilli, Erdemli =

Harfilli Cıcık
- Neighbourhood
- Location in Turkey
- Coordinates: 36°47′N 34°03′E
- Country: Turkey
- Province: Mersin
- District: Erdemli
- Elevation: 1,370 m (4,490 ft)
- Population (2022): 427
- Time zone: UTC+3 (TRT)
- Postal code: 33730
- Area code: 0324

Harfilli (former Cıcık) is a neighbourhood in the municipality and district of Erdemli, Mersin Province, Turkey. Its population is 427 (2022). It is situated in the high plateau of Toros Mountains. In summers, it is also a yayla of Erdemli which is about 40 kilometres (25 mi) south of Harfili. There are ancient ruins around the village. Main economic activities of the village are farming and animal breeding. The crops harvested are Tomato, cucumber, peach, cherry and apple. Every year a village festival named "Raw vegetable festival" is held in the village.
