= Çiriş, Erdemli =

Çiriş
- Neighbourhood
- Location in Turkey
- Coordinates: 36°38′N 34°13′E
- Country: Turkey
- Province: Mersin
- District: Erdemli
- Elevation: 560 m (1,840 ft)
- Population (2022): 1,000
- Time zone: UTC+3 (TRT)
- Postal code: 33730
- Area code: 0324

Çiriş is a neighbourhood in the municipality and district of Erdemli, Mersin Province, Turkey. Its population is 1,000 (2022). It is situated to the south of the dense forestry of the Taurus Mountains. The distance to Erdemli is 12 kilometres (7.5 mi) and to Mersin is 48 kilometres (30 mi). The village was founded in a place full of ancient ruins. It was named after the Turkish name of the plant Asphodelus. The main economic activity of the village is farming. Various vegetables and fruits (including greenhouse crops) are produced. Tropical fruits like avocado and kiwifruit are also produced.
