= Sıraç, Erdemli =

Sıraç
- Neighbourhood
- Location in Turkey
- Coordinates: 36°46′N 34°20′E
- Country: Turkey
- Province: Mersin
- District: Erdemli
- Elevation: 800 m (2,600 ft)
- Population (2022): 702
- Time zone: UTC+3 (TRT)
- Postal code: 33730
- Area code: 0324

Sıraç is a neighbourhood in the municipality and district of Erdemli, Mersin Province, Turkey. Its population is 702 (2022). It is situated in the southern slopes of the Toros Mountains. The distance to Erdemli is 25 kilometres (16 mi) and to Mersin is 40 kilometres (25 mi). The village was founded during the Ottoman Empire and in 1865 some members of Karakeçili Turkmen tribe were settled in the village. The village was specialized in saddle manufacture. Its earlier name Saraç ("saddle manufacturer") eventually became Sıraç. In the 20th century the former prefession was replaced by farming, beekeeping and animal breeding. The springs around the village also contribute to village economy.
