= Akpınar, Erdemli =

Akpınar
- Neighbourhood
- Location in Turkey
- Coordinates: 36°49′N 34°03′E
- Country: Turkey
- Province: Mersin
- District: Erdemli
- Elevation: 1,430 m (4,690 ft)
- Population (2022): 208
- Time zone: UTC+3 (TRT)
- Postal code: 33730
- Area code: 0324

Akpınar is a neighbourhood and yayla (summer resort) in the municipality and district of Erdemli, Mersin Province, Turkey. Its population is 208 (2022). It is situated in the Taurus Mountains. Akpınar is located 44 kilometers away from Erdemli and 80 kilometers away from Mersin. Being a yayla, the population increases during the summer months and most of the buildings in the village are vacant during the winter months.
