= Üzümlü, Erdemli =

Üzümlü
- Neighbourhood
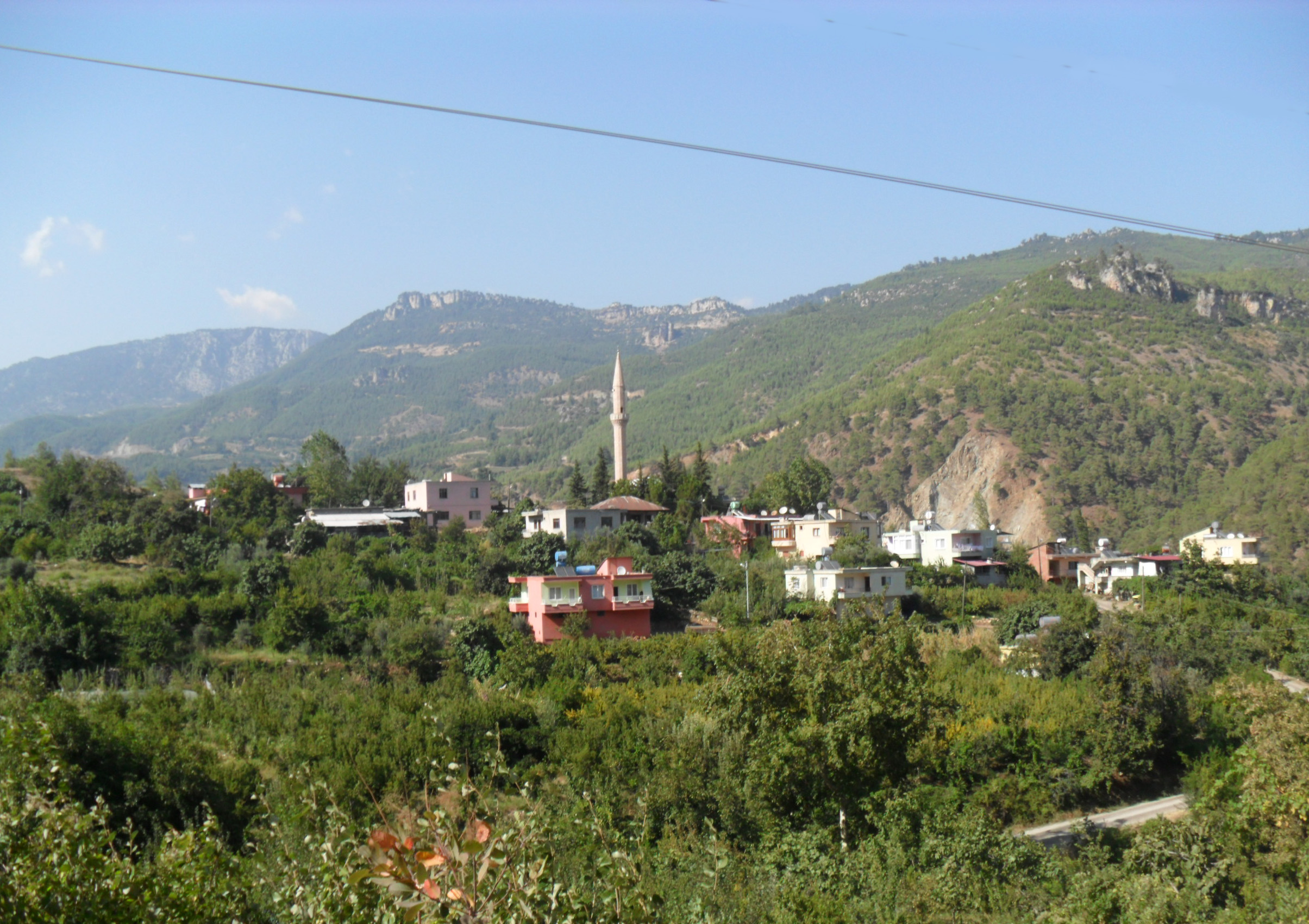

- Location within Turkey
- Coordinates: 36°51′N 34°20′E
- Country: Turkey
- Province: Mersin
- District: Erdemli
- Elevation: 625 m (2,051 ft)
- Population (2022): 221
- Time zone: UTC+3 (TRT)
- Postal code: 33730
- Area code: 0324

Üzümlü is a neighbourhood in the municipality and district of Erdemli, Mersin Province, Turkey. Its population is 221 (2022). It is situated in the valley of Müğlü creek in the Toros Mountains. It is surrounded by pine forests and vineyards. It is located 46 kilometres (29 mi) from Erdemli and 56 kilometres (35 mi) from Mersin.

The village was founded 200 years ago by Yörüks (once nomadic Turkmens) from Alanya. Later another clan from Malatya also settled in Üzümlü. It was a neighbourhood of Şahna called Küçük Şahna ("Little Şahna") until sundered and declared a separate village. Farming is the major activity of the village. As implied by the name of the village (Üzüm means "grape") the main crop of the village is grapes. Citrus is also produced.
