= Karakeşli =

- Neighbourhood
- Location in Turkey
- Coordinates: 36°39′N 34°19′E
- Country: Turkey
- Province: Mersin
- District: Erdemli
- Elevation: 80 m (260 ft)
- Population (2022): 887
- Time zone: UTC+3 (TRT)
- Postal code: 33730
- Area code: 0324

Karakeşli is a neighbourhood in the municipality and district of Erdemli, Mersin Province, Turkey. Its population is 887 (2022). It is 6 kilometres (3.7 mi) north east of Erdemli and about 42 kilometres (26 mi) west of Mersin. The population of the village is composed of a once-nomadic tribe (a subunit of Sarıkeçili Turkmen tribe) which was settled in 1865 in its present location. The major economic activity is greenhouse farming. Citrus cucumber and tomato are main crops.
