= Paşa Türbesi =

Tomb in Turkey

Coordinates: 36°28′38″N 34°10′15″E

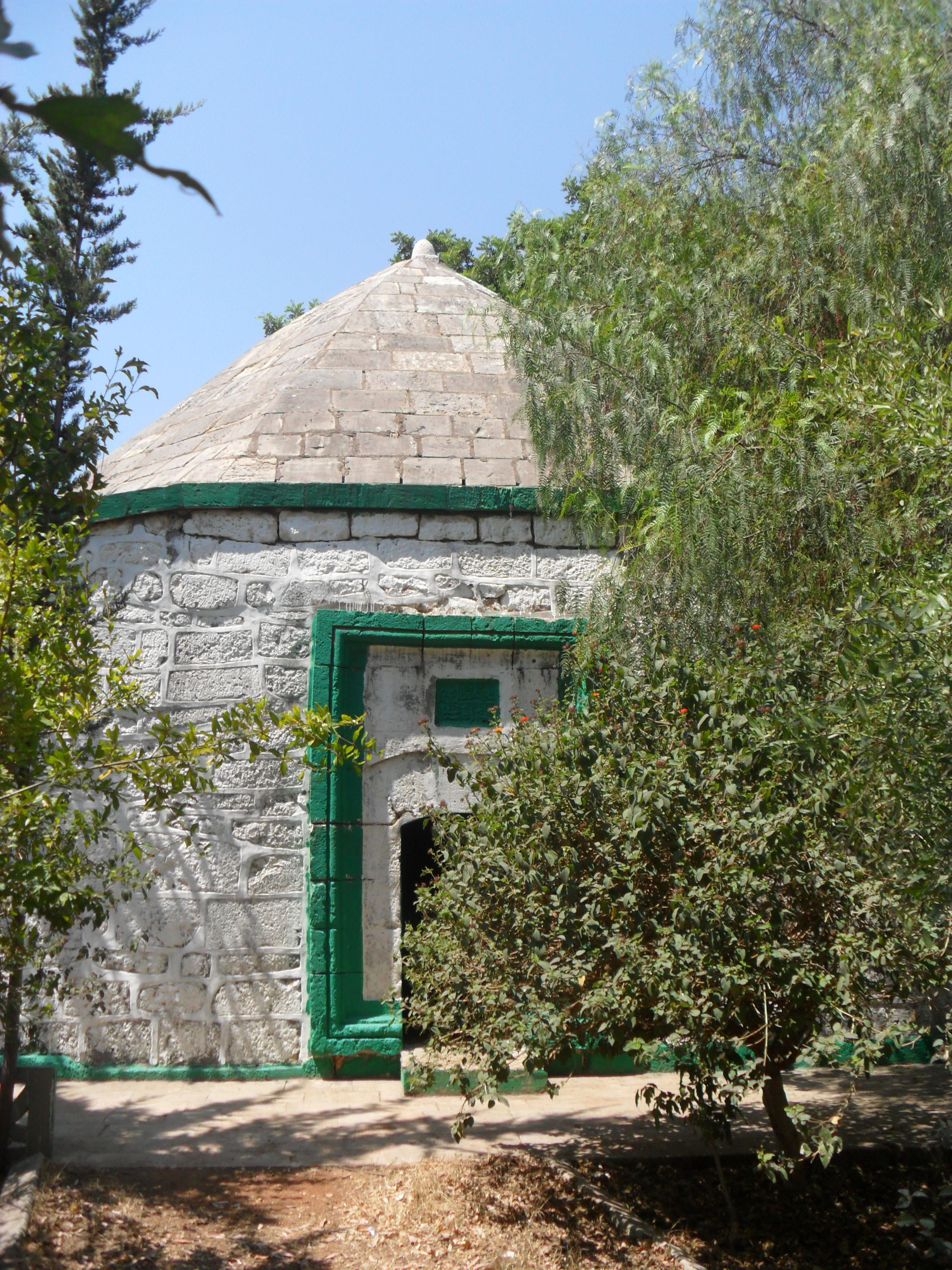

Paşa Türbesi (literally "The mausoleum of pasha") is a tomb in the Mersin Province, Turkey

== Geography ==
The small tomb is in the rural area of Erdemli district of the Mersin Province. It is on the north roadside of Turkish state highway D.400 which runs parallel to Mediterranean Sea side. It is situated to the west of Erdemli and Mersin. Its distance to Erdemli is 20 kilometres (12 mi) and to Mersin is 56 kilometres (35 mi). Paşa Türbesi is geographically between two important ancient sites: Elaiussa Sebaste (now Ayaş) is to the east and Corycus (now Kızkalesi) is to the west of Paşa Türbesi.

== History ==
During the 13th century, the area around Paşa Türbesi was a battle ground between the Seljuks of Turkey and The Armenian Kingdom of Cilicia.

The tomb belongs to a Seljuk commander named Aktaş oğlu Sinan (Sinan, Aktaş's son) who died in 1220. However according to Ali Selçuk, the tomb may belong to another person from Khorasan. Although there is an inscription about Sinan there is no account of how he died. The tomb was built after his death in 1312.

== Building ==
The tomb is a square building, with a hexagonal roof. Flat stones are used in the building. The entrance is via a door to northeast. Like most other tombs, an unofficial cemetery had been established around the tomb. There is also a wish tree just to the north of the tomb
