= Hüsametli =

- Neighbourhood
- Location in Turkey
- Coordinates: 36°40′N 34°09′E
- Country: Turkey
- Province: Mersin
- District: Erdemli
- Elevation: 840 m (2,760 ft)
- Population (2022): 523
- Time zone: UTC+3 (TRT)
- Postal code: 33730
- Area code: 0324

Hüsametli is a neighbourhood in the municipality and district of Erdemli, Mersin Province, Turkey. Its population is 523 (2022). It is 21 kilometres (13 mi) north-west of Erdemli and about 57 kilometres (35 mi) west of Mersin.

There are traces of ancient civilizations around the village (See Üçayaklı ruins). But the village was founded in the early 1800s by a local Turkish chieftain named Hüsamettin. The economy of the village depends on agriculture. Traditional dry farming is now being replaced by irrigated farming. The main crops are beans and cucumber. The attitude of the village is 840 m, which makes its climate pretty cold during the winter. Along with agriculture, some inhabitants of the village make their living with cattle breeding which is a traditional occupation of the Turkmen people. The literacy in the village is high particularly in the new generation. There are 3 coffee-houses in the village where people gather to socialize in their leisure time.
