= Güneyli, Erdemli =

Güneyli
- Neighbourhood
- Location in Turkey
- Coordinates: 36°47′N 34°01′E
- Country: Turkey
- Province: Mersin
- District: Erdemli
- Elevation: 1,400 m (4,600 ft)
- Population (2022): 427
- Time zone: UTC+3 (TRT)
- Postal code: 33730
- Area code: 0324

Güneyli is a neighbourhood in the municipality and district of Erdemli, Mersin Province, Turkey. Its population is 427 (2022). It is situated in the high plateau of Toros Mountains. Although there are forests around the village, the treeline of the Taurus Mountains is to the north of the village and the north of this line is devoid of forests. Its distance to Erdemli is 50 kilometres (31 mi) and to Mersin is 86 kilometres (53 mi). There are ruins of Roman buildings around the village and it is reported that some ancient water wells are still in use.

There is no document showing the founding date of the village, but the villagers are of Turkmen origin, and they tend to keep their traditional life styles. The main economic activities are animal breeding and farming. Cereals, tomatoes, and beans are the main products of the village. Fruit production is a relatively recent activity. Women in the village also weave rugs.
