= Arpaçbahşiş =

Settlement in Turkey

Arpaçbahşiş, Erdemli
- Neighbourhood
- Location within Turkey
- Coordinates: 36°39′N 34°21′E
- Country: Turkey
- Province: Mersin
- District: Erdemli
- Municipality: Erdemli Belediyesi
- Population (2022): 7,285
- Time zone: UTC+3 (TRT)
- Postal code: 33730
- Area code: 0324

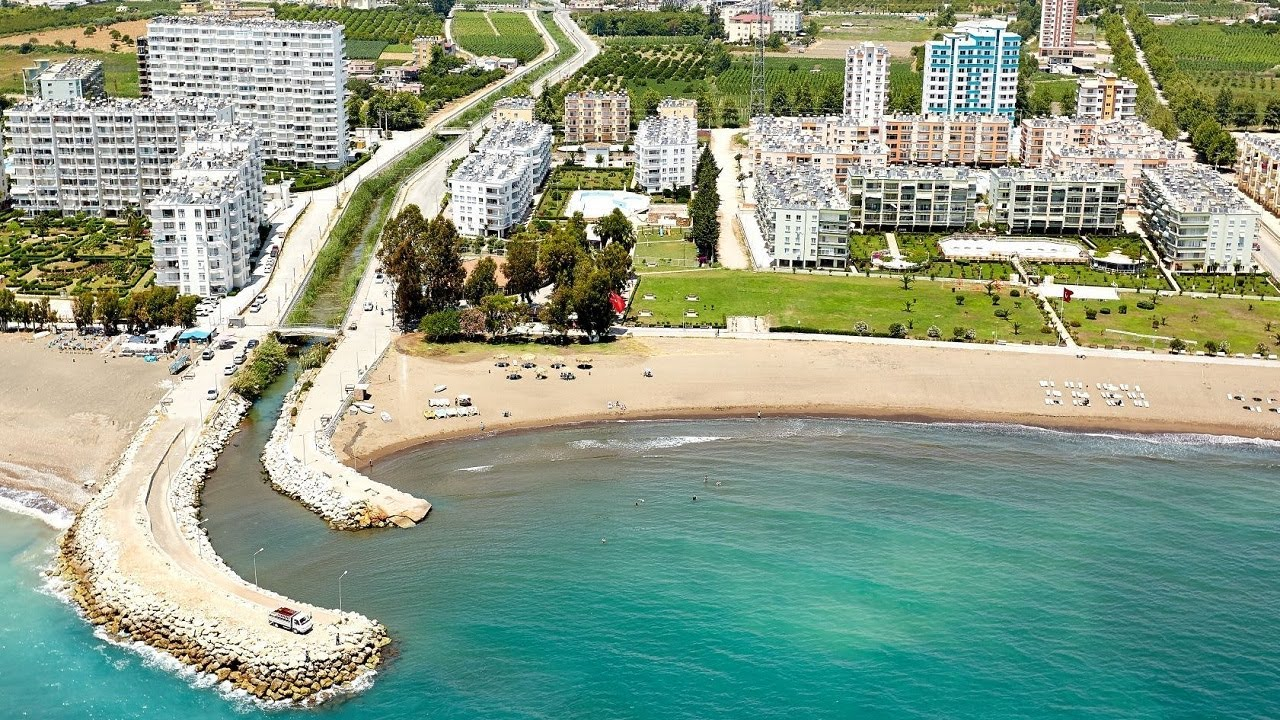
Arpaçbahşiş Public Beach (Halk Plajı) with gated communities nestled in the background

Arpaçbahşiş is a neighborhood within the municipality and district of Erdemli, Mersin Province, Turkey, with a population of 7,285 as of 2022. Prior to the administrative reorganization of 2013, it was classified as a town (belde). Currently, Arpaçbahşiş serves as a summer resort area, primarily attracting Turkish tourists. Its coastal location offers a shoreline that draws seasonal visitors seeking a local retreat. In the wake of the earthquake in Kahramanmaraş, many individuals affected by the disaster have begun to reside in the area during the winter months, with some transforming their vacation properties into primary residences. Additionally, in recent years, there has been a notable increase in residents from Russia.

== History ==
The area around Arpaçbahşiş was once part of Cilicia Pedias, the flat eastern region of ancient Cilicia. In the 13th to 16th centuries, during the rule of the Ramadanid principality, the Varsak Turkmen tribe settled north of present-day Tömük, a few kilometers northeast of Arpaçbahşiş. By around 1375, Elvan Bey of the Varsak tribe controlled the region near Arpaçbahşiş. However, the town itself was not established until much later, likely in the early 18th century during the Ottoman period. It was then that the Sarıkeçili, a Turkmen tribe from Konya in central Anatolia, moved to the area. The town was named after Arpaç Hüseyin, the chief of the Sarıkeçili tribe.

Arpaçbahşiş, formerly a village, was granted municipal status and became a town (belde) on July 28, 1971. With the enactment of Law No. 6360 by the Grand National Assembly of Turkey on November 12, 2012, it was reclassified as a neighborhood (mahalle).

== Geography ==
While the original settlement is located 2 km (1.2 mi) north of the Mediterranean coast, newer developments are being established along the coastal area. Arpaçbahşiş is positioned between Mersin and Erdemli, with Erdemli approximately 5 km (3.1 mi) to the west and Mersin around 30 km (19 mi) to the east. From Arpaçbahşiş, there is a view of the Taurus Mountains.

== Economy ==
Like many nearby towns, Arpaçbahşiş has traditionally been an agricultural community specializing in citrus fruits. Recently, however, the coastal area of Arpaçbahşiş has evolved into a popular summer resort, featuring numerous summer homes. Services for these properties have become an important and growing source of revenue for the town.

To support this development, Mersin Municipality (CHP) has enhanced infrastructure, expanded the bus network, and improved transportation options. Before these upgrades, residents primarily used dolmuşes—shared minibuses that provide public transportation—to travel to Mersin and Erdemli. Additionally, the area has become increasingly favored by Russian residents, some of whom live there year-round. This increasing demand has resulted in heightened construction activity and the development of new buildings in recent years. The demand primarily originates from Turkish vacationers, but it also includes foreign tourists, notably Russians.
