= Esenpınar =

Settlement in Turkey

- Neighbourhood
- Location in Turkey
- Coordinates: 36°35′N 34°07′E
- Country: Turkey
- Province: Mersin
- District: Erdemli
- Elevation: 780 m (2,560 ft)
- Population (2022): 1,287
- Time zone: UTC+3 (TRT)
- Postal code: 33730
- Area code: 0324

Esenpınar is a neighbourhood in the municipality and district of Erdemli, Mersin Province, Turkey. Its population is 1,287 (2022). Before the 2013 reorganisation, it was a town (belde).

== Geography ==
Esenpınar is located in the rural area of the Erdemli district of Mersin Province. It lies on the southern slopes of the Toros Mountains at an altitude of 780 m (2,560 ft). The distance to Erdemli is 27 km (17 mi) and to Mersin is 65 km (40 mi).

== History ==
The former name of the settlement was Gövere. Gövere was founded by a Turkmen tribe called Sarıkeçili. Although the exact date of foundation is uncertain, it is claimed that the settlement might have been founded during the era of Seljuks, (i.e., 12-13th century). The mosque of Gövere was built in 1741 and there is a grave stone which dates back to 1461. The settlement was declared a township in 1992.

== Economy ==
The main economic activity is irrigated farming, the source of irrigation being Limonlu River and Gövere puddle at the north of the town. Cauliflower, bean, tomato, apple and peach are among the more important crops.
