= Arslanlı, Erdemli =

Arslanlı
- Neighbourhood
- Location in Turkey
- Coordinates: 36°40′N 34°10′E
- Country: Turkey
- Province: Mersin
- District: Erdemli
- Elevation: 870 m (2,850 ft)
- Population (2022): 585
- Time zone: UTC+3 (TRT)
- Postal code: 33730
- Area code: 0324

Arslanlı (formerly Akkuyu) is a neighbourhood in the municipality and district of Erdemli, Mersin Province, Turkey. Its population is 585 (2022). It is located 18 kilometres (11 mi) north west of Erdemli and 54 kilometres (34 mi) west of Mersin. The village is at the junction of village roads from Erdemli, one to north and one to west. (The road to west leads to some ruins of the ancient ages.) Thus the village is a convenient place as a stop for people traveling to other villages and there are a number of self-service kebab shops (known as Kendin pişir kendin ye). The major economic activity in Arslanlı is farming.
