= Kızkalesi =

- Neighbourhood
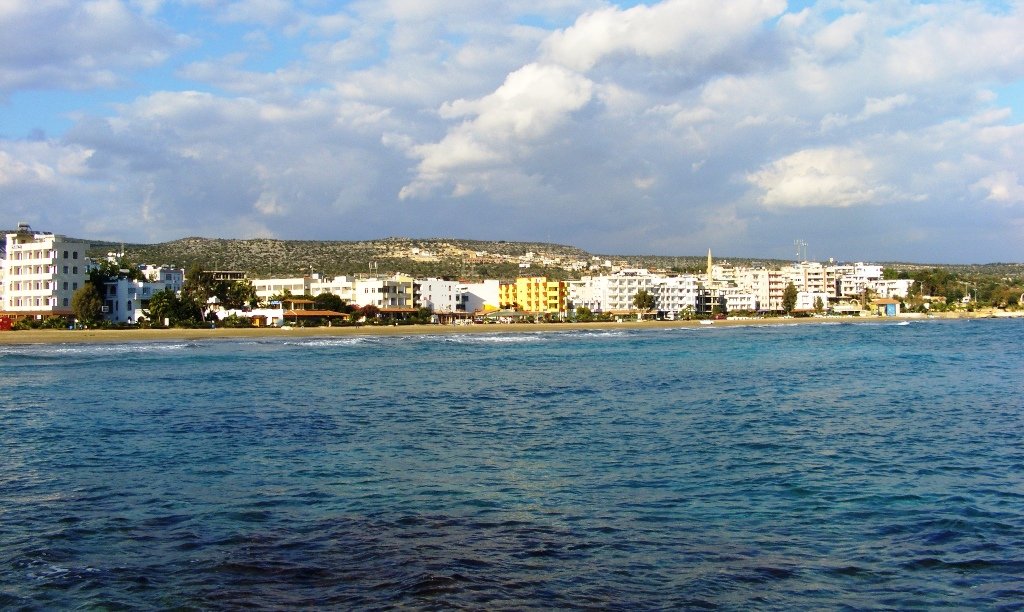

- Location within Turkey
- Coordinates: 36°28′N 34°09′E
- Country: Turkey
- Province: Mersin
- District: Erdemli
- Elevation: 10 m (33 ft)
- Population (2022): 1,781
- Time zone: UTC+3 (TRT)
- Postal code: 33730
- Area code: 0324

Kızkalesi (English: Maiden's castle) is a neighbourhood in the municipality and district of Erdemli, Mersin Province, Turkey. Its population is 1,781 (2022). Before the 2013 reorganisation, it was a town (belde). The town, known in Antiquity as Corycus or Korykos (Greek: Κώρυκος), is named after the ancient castle built on a small island just facing the town.

== Geography ==
Kızkalesi is a Mediterranean coastal town. The Taurus Mountains are located north of the town and in fact some quarters of the town are situated on the lower mountain slopes. The surrounding area is mostly covered by maquis shrubland.

Kızkalesi is west of Erdemli and Mersin. It is on the D 400 highway, the highway distances being 23 kilometres (14 mi) to Erdemli and 60 kilometres (37 mi) to Mersin.

== People and history ==
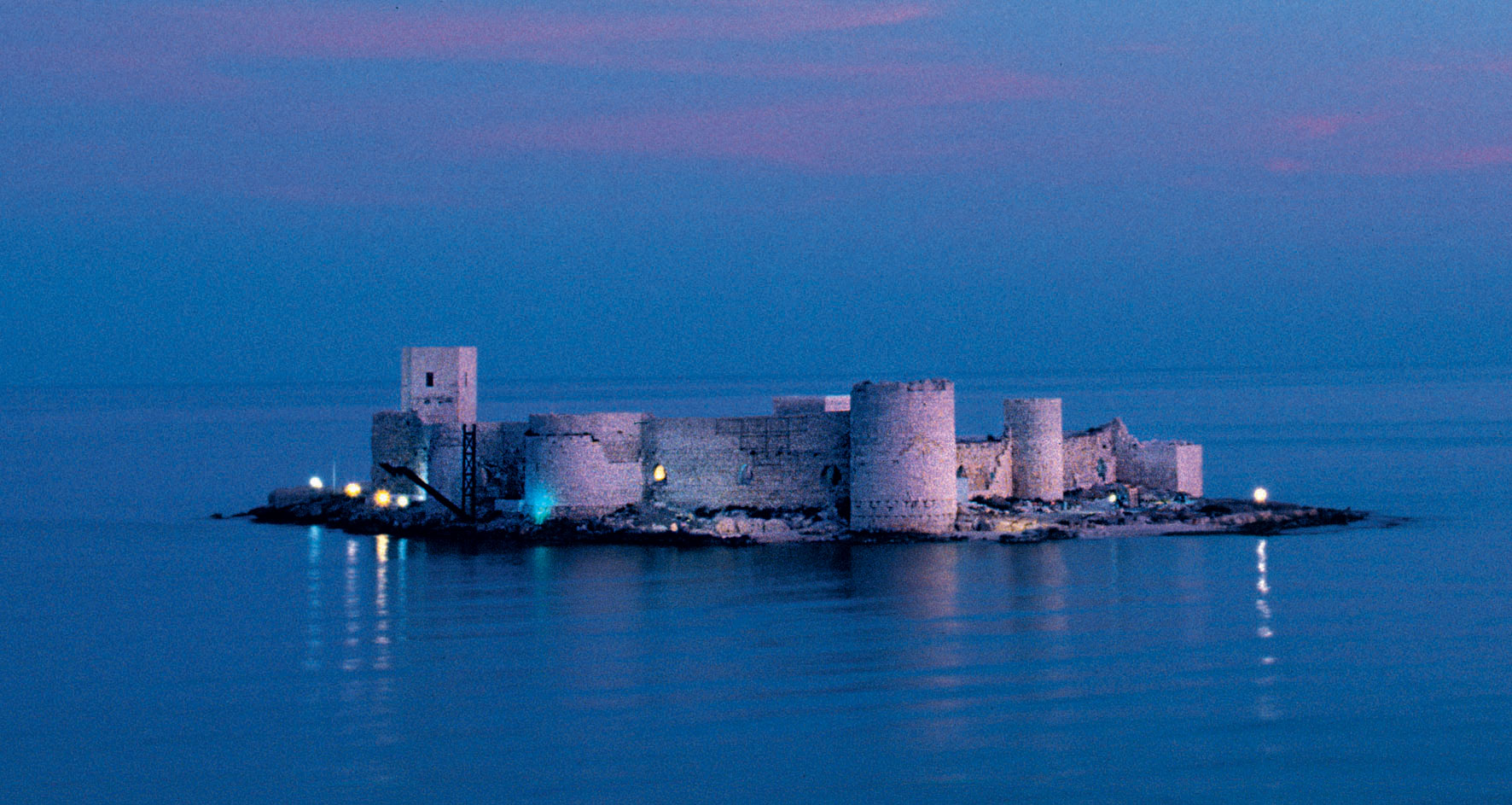
The "Maiden's castle" facing the town.

Ancient Corycus was a large city. It became part of the Seleucid Empire, the Roman Empire, the Byzantine Empire, the various Seljuk empires, the Armenian Kingdom of Cilicia, Beylik of Karaman, and finally the Ottoman Empire. In Turkish history, it is known as Prince Cem Sultan's departing point from Turkey in 1482 after his defeat in an Ottoman civil war on his way to Rome. After Cem's departure, Kızkalesi became the winter settlement of nomadic Turkmen tribes known as Ayaş. It was declared as a seat of township in 1992.

== Economy ==
The most important economic activities are agriculture and tourism. Tomatoes, cucumbers, apricots, beans, and citrus are the most cultivated crops. With widespread historical ruins and wide beaches, the touristic potential of the town is notable, but Kızkalesi's tourism economy is not yet up to international standards.

== At Mediterranean Games ==
The beach of Kızkalesi hosted beach volleyball at the 2013 Mediterranean Games held in Mersin.
