= Küstülü =

- Neighbourhood
- Location in Turkey
- Coordinates: 36°41′N 34°06′E
- Country: Turkey
- Province: Mersin
- District: Erdemli
- Elevation: 1,170 m (3,840 ft)
- Population (2022): 751
- Time zone: UTC+3 (TRT)
- Postal code: 33730
- Area code: 0324

Küstülü (former Yanıkköy) is a neighbourhood in the municipality and district of Erdemli, Mersin Province, Turkey. Its population is 751 (2022). It is 30 kilometres (19 mi) north west of Erdemli and about 65 kilometres (40 mi) west of Mersin. Even though the village was founded in 1790 by a Turkmen tribe named Elbeyli, there are traces of ancient civilizations around the village (See Üçayaklı ruins). Küstüllü is a dispersed settlement due to a shortage of irrigation water. The villages' main economic activity is farming. Tomato cucumber and beans are among the main crops. Fruits like plum, peach and apple are also produced.
