= Koramşalı =

Koramşalı Kirazlı
- Neighbourhood
- Location in Turkey
- Coordinates: 36°44′N 34°11′E
- Country: Turkey
- Province: Mersin
- District: Erdemli
- Elevation: 700 m (2,300 ft)
- Population (2022): 437
- Time zone: UTC+3 (TRT)
- Postal code: 33730
- Area code: 0324

Koramşalı (former Kirazlı) is a neighbourhood in the municipality and district of Erdemli, Mersin Province, Turkey. Its population is 437 (2022). It is situated in the valley of Alata creek. The distance to Erdemli is 26 kilometres (16 mi) and to Mersin is 60 kilometres (37 mi). Recently a road to the Saklı şelale waterfalls next to the village was constructed.

== History ==
Located on the eastern side of a plateau, Koramşalı is quite secluded, and, although not fully investigated, it seems to have a rich history. In the vicinity of the village there are ancient graves as well as caves which are thought to have been inhabited in ancient times. There are also rock tanks for must and vine from the Roman era. An undated stone bridge may also be a Roman bridge. Although there are 5-6 century-old sycamore trees within the village, the exact founding date of the present village is not known.

== Economy ==
Koramşalı is a typical agricultural village. Tomato, peach, cherry, nut and pomegranate are its main products. Pomegranate syrup is also produced. The secondary economic activity is cattle breeding.
