= Limonlu, Mersin =

Limonlu Lamas
- Neighbourhood
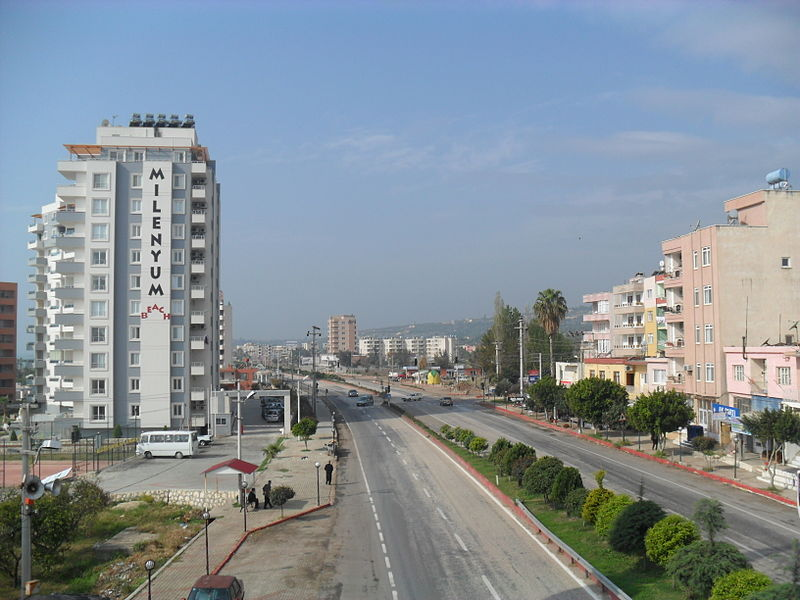

- Location within Turkey
- Coordinates: 36°33′N 34°14′E
- Country: Turkey
- Province: Mersin
- District: Erdemli
- Elevation: 5 m (16 ft)
- Population (2022): 2,939
- Time zone: UTC+3 (TRT)
- Postal code: 33730
- Area code: 0324

Limonlu (ancient: Antiochia Lamotidos; Byzantine: Lamousia; Arabic: Lāmis; Armenian: Lamos, popularly called Lamas) is a neighbourhood in the municipality and district of Erdemli, Mersin Province, Turkey. Its population is 2,939 (2022). Before the 2013 reorganisation, it was a town (belde).

== Geography ==
Limonlu is a coastal town by the river Limonlu. Highway distances to selected localities are as follows: 9 kilometres (5.6 mi) to Erdemli 38 kilometres (24 mi) to Silifke (another district center in Mersin Province) and 45 kilometres (28 mi) to Mersin.

== History ==
In antiquity the Limonlu River was the boundary between Cilicia Pedias and Cilicia Trachea, making Limonlu an important border town. In the 10th century A.D. it was a Greek frontier post where prisoners of war were exchanged with the Arabs who controlled Cilicia Pedias. The Byzantine Emperor Manuel I Komnenos captured the town from the Armenians in 1158, but lost it shortly thereafter to the Armenian Kingdom of Cilicia. In the 1160s Vasak, the brother of the Armenian Baron of Papeŕōn (Çandır Castle), was listed in the Chronicle of Smbat as the lord of Lamas Castle. The Armenians maintained possession of this strategic site until the 14th-century invasion of the Karamanids. The Ottomans captured the town and its fortress in the late 15th century.

The ruins of the castle are located 1 kilometer (0.62 mi) north of the town and consist of a very symmetrical oval wall and at least five towers. At the west end a large fortified wall with a square bastion is placed inside the circuit wall. Most of the fort’s masonry consists of spolia taken from the nearby late antique city and necropolis. Because of its peculiar layout, masonry, and techniques of construction, it is highly likely that this is a Byzantine castle. An extensive photographic survey and plan of Limonlu fortress was made between 1973 and 1979.

== Economy ==
Like most Mediterranean coastal towns, Limonlu produces fresh vegetables and fruits. The town used to specialize in citrus production and the name of the town means with lemon. But lately, tourism has almost replaced agriculture as the most important economic activity. In 4 kilometres (2.5 mi) Limonlu coastal band, there are many summer houses owned by city dwellers (Turkish: yazlık site). The coastal band is also used for tent camps. Most of the town houses on the other hand, are rented as summer boarding houses.

== University ==
Middle East Technical University in Ankara has a campus just east of Limonlu (called Mersin–Erdemli campus) used by the Institute/Graduate School of Marine Sciences (Turkish: Deniz Bilimleri Enstitüsü) since 1975.

== Notable native ==
- Nevit Kodallı, composer
