= Elbeyli, Erdemli =

Elbeyli
- Neighbourhood
- Location in Turkey
- Coordinates: 36°41′N 34°01′E
- Country: Turkey
- Province: Mersin
- District: Erdemli
- Elevation: 1,330 m (4,360 ft)
- Population (2022): 506
- Time zone: UTC+3 (TRT)
- Postal code: 33730
- Area code: 0324

Elbeyli is a neighbourhood in the municipality and district of Erdemli, Mersin Province, Turkey. Its population is 506 (2022). It is located in the forests of Toros Mountains. Its distance to Erdemli is 46 kilometres (29 mi) and to Mersin is 82 kilometres (51 mi). The village was founded in 1800s by Turkmen people. The main economic activity of the village is farming. Tomato, cucumber and beans are produced.
