= Alata Research Institute of Horticulture =

Horticulture research institute in Mersin Province, Turkey

Alata Research Institute of Horticulture (Turkish: Alata Bahçe Kültürleri Araştırma Enstitüsü) is a research institute for horticulture in Mersin Province, Turkey.

== Location ==
The institute, located at about 36°38′N 34°21′E, is close to Erdemli ilçe (district). It is on the state highway D.400, which connects Mersin to west along the Mediterranean coastline. It covers an area of 4,000 daa (4.0 km^{2}; 1.5 sq mi) stretching 3 km (1.9 mi) on the coastline.

== History ==
In 1944, a school of horticulture was established in the location known as Alata, just east of Erdemli. In 1967, the institute was established next to the school, and in 1981, the infrastructure of the school was transferred to the institute. In 2011, Tarsus Water and Soil Institute was merged into Alata Research Institute of Horticulture. It is a subsidiary of the Department of Agricultural Research and Policies at the Ministry of Food, Agriculture and Livestock. Manager of the institute is Dr. Davut Keleş.

== Services ==
In addition to research and development in horticulture, the institute produces and improves the quality of fruits and vegetables. It also carries out analysis on soil, leaves, fertilizer as well as irrigation water, and helps the local farmers. The zone of responsibility of the institute covers entire Mediterranean Region.
