= Kuşluca, Erdemli =

Kuşluca
- Neighbourhood
- Location in Turkey
- Coordinates: 36°52′N 34°06′E
- Country: Turkey
- Province: Mersin
- District: Erdemli
- Elevation: 1,625 m (5,331 ft)
- Population (2022): 99
- Time zone: UTC+3 (TRT)
- Postal code: 33730
- Area code: 0324

Kuşluca ("(place) with birds") is a neighbourhood in the municipality and district of Erdemli, Mersin Province, Turkey. Its population is 99 (2022). It is situated in the high plateau of the Toros Mountains. The distance to Erdemli is 50 kilometres (31 mi) and to Mersin 85 kilometres (53 mi). There are forests around the village and the village is named after the birdsongs from the forest. Until 2005, Kuşluca was a hamlet. During the summers the population may increase. The main economic activities of the village are vegetable agriculture and animal husbandry. The main crops are fruits.
