= Toros, Erdemli =

Toros Küçüksorgun
- Neighbourhood
- Location within Turkey
- Coordinates: 36°53′N 34°07′E
- Country: Turkey
- Province: Mersin
- District: Erdemli
- Elevation: 1,580 m (5,180 ft)
- Population (2022): 322
- Time zone: UTC+3 (TRT)
- Postal code: 33730
- Area code: 0324

Toros (named after the mountain range in which the village has been founded) or Küçüksorgun, as it is popularly called, is a neighbourhood in the municipality and district of Erdemli, Mersin Province, Turkey. As of 2022, its population was 322. The distance between Toros and Erdemli is 55 kilometres (34 mi) and its distance to Mersin is 90 kilometres (56 mi). It is also connected to Ayrancı in the Karaman Province to the north over the mountains by a stabilized road through 300-year-old cedar forests. The village is situated in the Taurus Mountains and is one of the highest locations of the Mersin Province. In the summer it is used as a summer resort, a so-called yayla.

Around Toros, there are ruins dating back to the Roman and Byzantine eras and tombstones from the Ottoman era. The main economic activities of the village are vegetable agriculture and beekeeping. The main crops are tomato, cucumber, beans and cabbage.
