= Karahıdırlı =

- Neighbourhood
- Location in Turkey
- Coordinates: 36°44′N 34°16′E
- Country: Turkey
- Province: Mersin
- District: Erdemli
- Elevation: 700 m (2,300 ft)
- Population (2022): 1,267
- Time zone: UTC+3 (TRT)
- Postal code: 33730
- Area code: 0324

Karahıdırlı is a neighbourhood in the municipality and district of Erdemli, Mersin Province, Turkey. Its population is 1,267 (2022). It is situated on the southern slopes of the Toros Mountains.
