= Güzeloluk =

- Neighbourhood
- Location in Turkey
- Coordinates: 36°48′N 34°05′E
- Country: Turkey
- Province: Mersin
- District: Erdemli
- Elevation: 1,400 m (4,600 ft)
- Population (2022): 702
- Time zone: UTC+3 (TRT)
- Postal code: 33730
- Area code: 0324

Güzeloluk (former Yağda-Koyuncu) is a neighbourhood in the municipality and district of Erdemli, Mersin Province, Turkey. Its population is 702 (2022). It is situated in the high plateau of the Taurus Mountains. In summer, it is also a yayla (resort) of Erdemli which is about 35 kilometres (22 mi) south of Güzeloluk. The village was founded in 1865. The present name of the village refers to a public fountain built in the village.
