= Çeşmeli =

Settlement in Turkey

- Neighbourhood
- Location in Turkey
- Coordinates: 36°41′N 34°25′E
- Country: Turkey
- Province: Mersin
- District: Erdemli
- Elevation: 5 m (16 ft)
- Population (2022): 5,925
- Time zone: UTC+3 (TRT)
- Postal code: 33730
- Area code: 0324

Çeşmeli is a neighbourhood in the municipality and district of Erdemli, Mersin Province, Turkey. Its population is 5,925 (2022). Before the 2013 reorganisation, it was a town (belde).

== Geography ==
Çeşmeli midtown is situated two kilometers north of the Mediterranean seaside and at the east of the rivulet Kargıpınarı (which is also known as Gelinderesi). The town of Kargıpınarı is at the west of the rivulet. Çeşmeli is between Mersin and Erdemli on the highway D400. The distance to Mersin is 23 km (14 mi) and 14 km (8.7 mi) to Erdemli. Çeşmeli is also the west end of Çukurova motorway.

== History ==
Nothing definite is known about the origin of the town. According to legend, the earliest settlement was established 300 years ago by a certain Şahin Ali Bey at a location nearer to Mersin. The settlers moved to the present site later on, using the name of their former settlement, Çeşmeli (meaning location with a fountain). It was declared a township in 1969.

== Economy ==
The major economic activity is agriculture. Çeşmeli along with the neighbouring Kargıpınarı is one of the most important citrus producers of Mersin Province and Mersin Province is the most important citrus producer of Turkey. In recent years floriculture has become another profitable activity. At the coastal strip of the town there are summer houses of city dwellers as well as foreigners and services to summer houses also seem promising.
