= Kargıpınarı =

Kargıpınarı Gilindire
- Neighbourhood
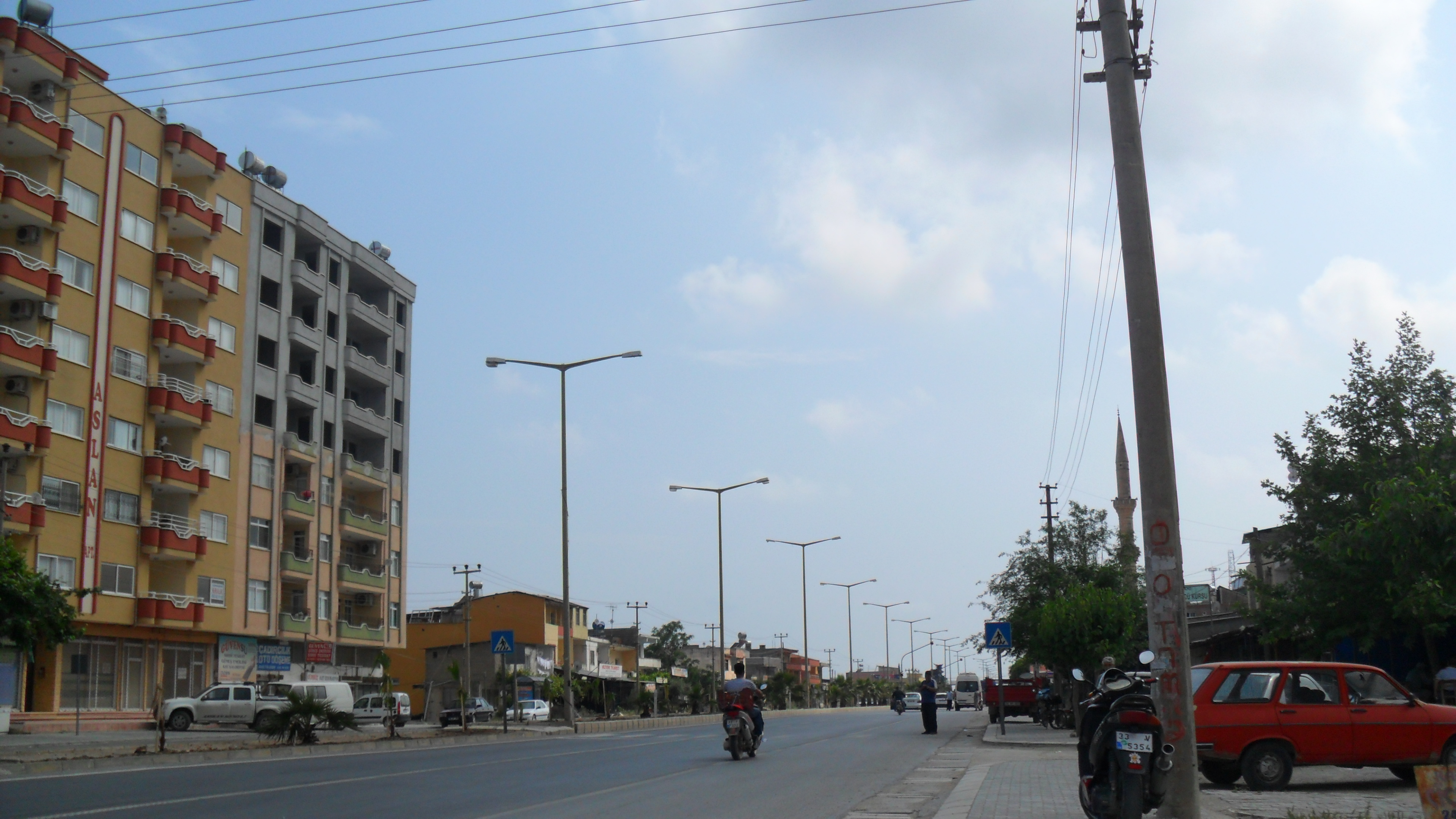

- Location within Turkey
- Coordinates: 36°40′N 34°25′E
- Country: Turkey
- Province: Mersin
- District: Erdemli
- Elevation: 5 m (16 ft)
- Population (2022): 13,959
- Time zone: UTC+3 (TRT)
- Postal code: 33730
- Area code: 0324

Kargıpınarı (former Gilindire) is a neighbourhood in the municipality and district of Erdemli, Mersin Province, Turkey. Its population is 13,959 (2022). Before the 2013 reorganisation, it was a town (belde).

== Geography ==
Kargıpınarı is situated on the Mersin Antalya highway. The town is 12 kilometres (7.5 mi) east of Erdemli and 25 kilometres (16 mi) west of Mersin.

== Etymology and History ==
The former name of the town is Gilindire. There are two theories about the origin of this name. The town shares the same name with the river at the east side of the town. The earliest reference to the river can be found in Evliya Çelebi’s Seyahatname of 1671 with the name Gelendir. According to the other theory the name began to be used as recently as 19th century. It is known that the village had been established by Oghuz Turks (Turkmens) who had migrated from Aydıncık district of Mersin in the 19th century. The Turkmen used the former name of Aydıncık (which was Kelenderis) for their new home. But later the name of a spring around the village came to be used both for the village and for the river. (Kargıpınarı English: Spring of cane)

The population of the village increased in the first half of the 20th century and Kargıpınarı was declared a seat of township in 1969.

== Economy ==
The major economic activity is agriculture. Kargıpınarı is one of the most important citrus producers of the Mersin Province and Mersin Province is the most important citrus producer of Turkey. Other crops such as tomatoes and cucumbers are also produced. The citrus plantation is mostly in the north of the town. The Mediterranean coast is just about 2 kilometres (1.2 mi) from the center of the town and the newer houses are built at the sea side as summer resort housing estates for the city dwellers.
