= Kocahasanlı =

Settlement in Turkey

- Neighbourhood
- Location within Turkey
- Coordinates: 36°35′N 34°16′E
- Country: Turkey
- Province: Mersin
- District: Erdemli
- Elevation: 30 m (98 ft)
- Population (2022): 4,495
- Time zone: UTC+3 (TRT)
- Postal code: 33730
- Area code: 0324

Kocahasanlı is a neighbourhood in the municipality and district of Erdemli, Mersin Province, Turkey. Its population is 4,495 (2022). Before the 2013 reorganisation, it was a town (belde).

== Geography ==
The distance to Erdemli is 5 kilometres (3.1 mi) and to Mersin is 41 kilometres (25 mi).

== People and history ==
Although there are ruins around the town, the town itself is quite young. The population of Kocahasanlı is composed of Yörüks who were nomadic Turkmen. They settled in a location named Üçtepe, 3 kilometres (1.9 mi) northwest of the town in 1928. In 1952 the village was relocated to its present location. But there is also a group of families which had moved from Bulgaria as a result of ethnic repression by the Bulgarian government against Turks during the 1950s. In 1972, Kocahasanlı was declared a seat of township.

== Economy ==
The main economic activity is greenhouse vegetable agriculture. The town also produces citrus and bananas. The coastline of Kocahasanlı is about 2,500 metres (8,200 ft) long and summer tourism begins to play a part in town revenues.
