= Tömük =

Settlement in Turkey

- Neighbourhood
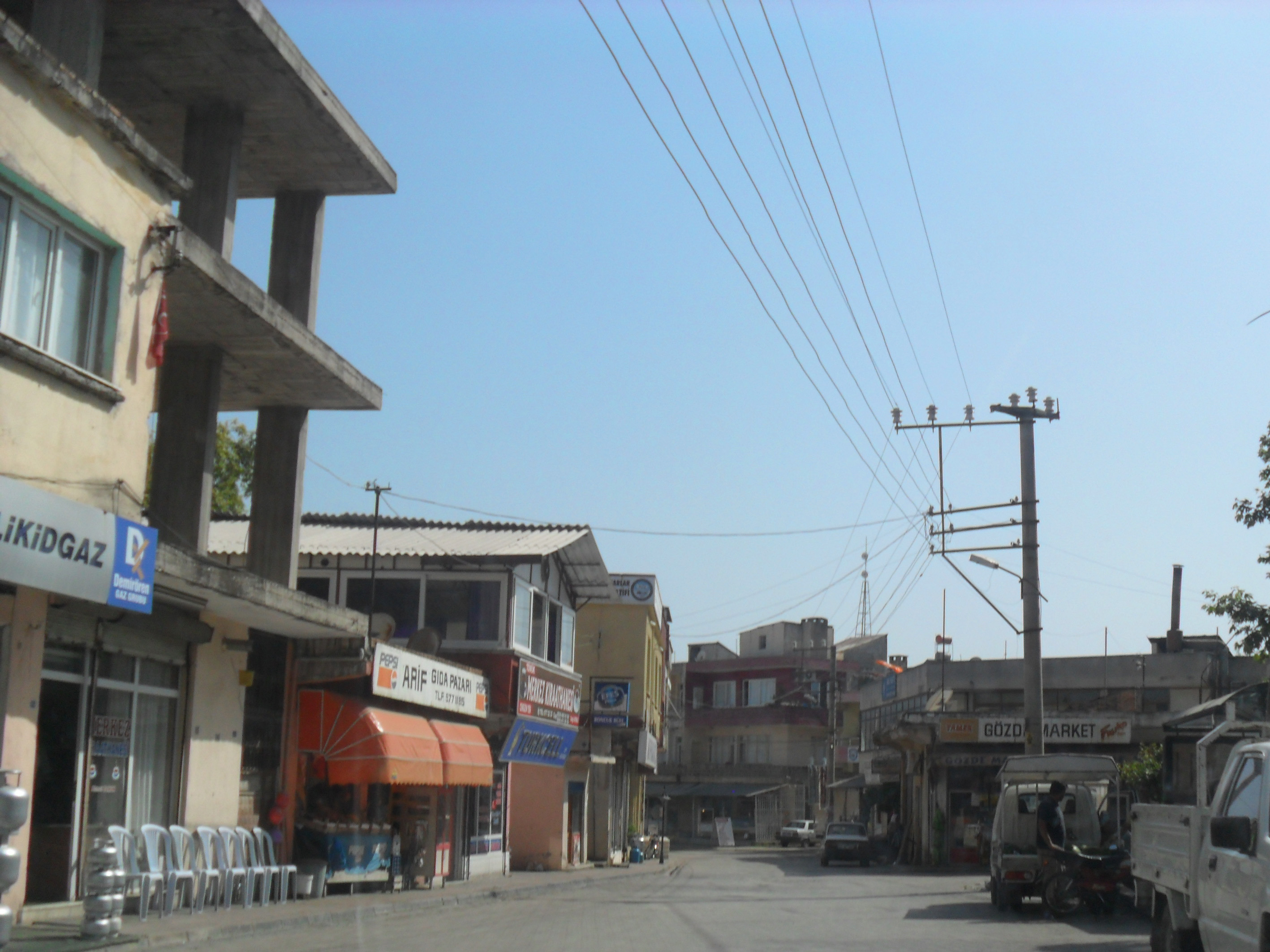

- Location within Turkey
- Coordinates: 36°40′N 34°23′E
- Country: Turkey
- Province: Mersin
- District: Erdemli
- Population (2022): 12,170
- Time zone: UTC+3 (TRT)
- Postal code: 33730
- Area code: 0324

Tömük is a neighbourhood in the municipality and district of Erdemli, Mersin Province, Turkey. Its population is 12,170 (2022). Before the 2013 reorganisation, Tömük was a town (belde). It is inhabited by Tahtacı.

== Geography ==
Tömük is in the rural area of Erdemli district. Although the midtown is 3 km (1.9 mi) north of the seaside, newer quarters of the town are founded at the seaside just to the south of the main highway D.400 connecting Mersin to the west. The highway distance to Mersin is 27 km (17 mi) and 12 km (7.5 mi) to Erdemli.

== History ==
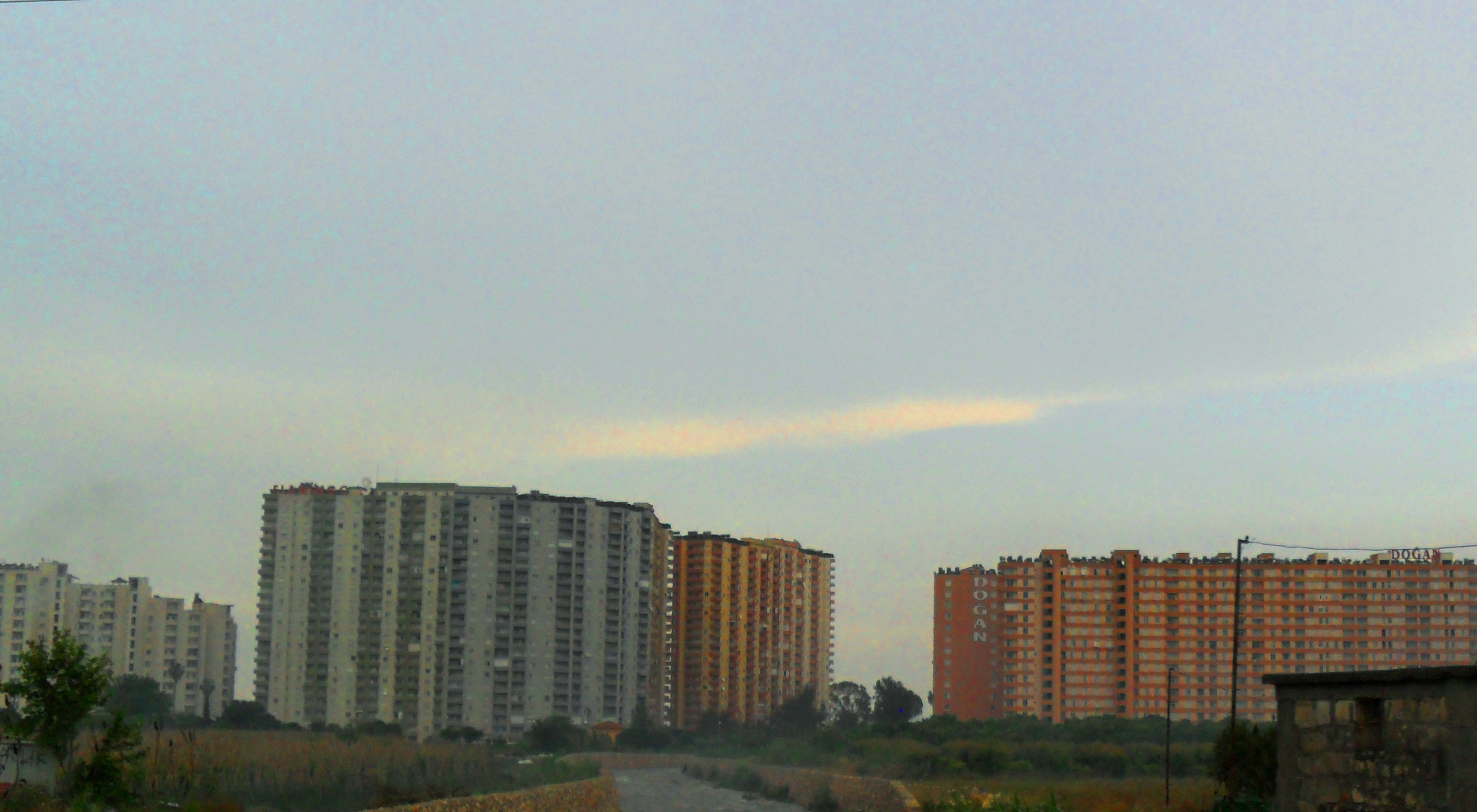
Summer houses

The earliest settlers were the members of a Turkmen tribe of a certain Elvan Bey in the 14th century. They founded the village of Elvanlı a few kilometers east of Tömük. Tömük was a just a hamlet used occasionally by the Elvanlı residents. But, early in the last years of the 18th century, people from other villages began to populate Tömük. In 1969, Tömük was declared a township.

Tömük is home to a large Tahtacı population.

== Economy ==
The major economic activity is citrus horticulture. Olive, tomato and green pepper are among the other important crops. Services for summer houses in the coastal band also contribute to the economy of the town.
