= Elvanlı =

- Neighbourhood
- Location in Turkey
- Coordinates: 36°42′N 34°22′E
- Country: Turkey
- Province: Mersin
- District: Erdemli
- Elevation: 160 m (520 ft)
- Population (2022): 2,337
- Time zone: UTC+3 (TRT)
- Postal code: 33730
- Area code: 0324

Elvanlı is a neighbourhood in the municipality and district of Erdemli, Mersin Province, Turkey. Its population is 2,337 (2022). It is 5 kilometres (3.1 mi) north of state road D.400 and 6 kilometres (3.7 mi) north of the coast of the Mediterranean Sea. Its distance to Erdemli is 15 kilometres (9.3 mi) and 28 kilometres (17 mi) to Mersin. The altitude of the village is about 160 metres (520 ft).

== History ==
The name of the village refers to a certain Elvan Bey who founded the village in the 14th century. Elvan Bey was a Turkmen leader and it is claimed that he was probably a member of Karamanids house which established the Beylik of Karaman. During the Ottoman Empire era, Elvanlı was a seat of bucak (subcounty). But later on the nearby village Tömük, a former hamlet of Elvanlı, became a local center of attraction causing Elvanlı's importance to partially decline.

== Economy ==
Elvanlı is one of the wealthier villages of Mersin Province. Several kinds of citrus fruit are produced in large quantities. The village is also famous for its picnic area called Dedekavak.
