= Erdemli =

- District and municipality
- Map showing Erdemli District in Mersin Province

- Location in Turkey
- Coordinates: 36°36′20″N 34°18′40″E
- Country: Turkey
- Province: Mersin

Government
  - Mayor: Mustafa Kara (MHP)
- Area: 2,279 km^{2} (880 sq mi)
- Population (2022): 151,928
  - Density: 66.66/km^{2} (172.7/sq mi)
- Time zone: UTC+3 (TRT)
- Postal code: 33730
- Area code: 0324
- Website: www.erdemli.bel.tr

Erdemli is a municipality and district of Mersin Province, Turkey. Its area is 2,279 km^{2}, and its population is 151,928 (2022). It is 35 km (22 mi) west of the city of Mersin.

== Geography ==
Erdemli is located between the districts of Mezitli (to the east) and Silifke (to the west). In the north, Erdemli is bordered by Karaman Province and in the south by the Mediterranean Sea.

The district extends from the Mediterranean coastal plain, the largest agricultural area in Mersin Province, to high in the Taurus Mountains where there is forest, and then a large area (half the land area of the district) is high mountain above the treeline.

Erdemli is a quiet rural district where the people are conservative, and is traditionally a strong base for Turkish nationalism. The local economy is centered around on agriculture. The coastal plain is covered with citrus fruits, bananas, and various fruits and vegetables grown year-round in open fields or in greenhouses. High meadows in the mountains are planted with grain pulses and fruits such as apples, peaches, and cherries. At these altitudes there are also vineyards, olive groves, and fig trees.

This is an attractive forested coastal district, and Erdemli is now attracting investment in infrastructure to develop a tourist industry.

The coast is home to the endangered Mediterranean monk seal. The Middle East Technical University in Ankara has an Institute of Marine Sciences graduate school here, which has a biology group that monitors the seals.

=== Climate ===
Erdemli has a hot-summer Mediterranean climate (Köppen: Csa), with hot, muggy, virtually rainless summers, and mild, rainy winters.

Climate data for Erdemli (1991–2020)
Month	Jan	Feb	Mar	Apr	May	Jun	Jul	Aug	Sep	Oct	Nov	Dec	Year
Mean daily maximum °C (°F)	15.2 (59.4)	16.1 (61.0)	18.8 (65.8)	22.0 (71.6)	25.7 (78.3)	29.0 (84.2)	31.5 (88.7)	32.3 (90.1)	30.7 (87.3)	27.5 (81.5)	21.9 (71.4)	16.9 (62.4)	24.0 (75.2)
Daily mean °C (°F)	10.0 (50.0)	10.7 (51.3)	13.2 (55.8)	16.6 (61.9)	20.8 (69.4)	24.7 (76.5)	27.8 (82.0)	28.3 (82.9)	25.6 (78.1)	21.3 (70.3)	15.8 (60.4)	11.6 (52.9)	18.9 (66.0)
Mean daily minimum °C (°F)	5.2 (41.4)	5.5 (41.9)	7.5 (45.5)	10.9 (51.6)	15.3 (59.5)	19.8 (67.6)	23.4 (74.1)	23.7 (74.7)	20.0 (68.0)	15.2 (59.4)	10.1 (50.2)	6.8 (44.2)	13.7 (56.7)
Average precipitation mm (inches)	106.81 (4.21)	78.07 (3.07)	54.03 (2.13)	38.22 (1.50)	22.61 (0.89)	7.54 (0.30)	2.01 (0.08)	2.71 (0.11)	8.37 (0.33)	34.93 (1.38)	71.92 (2.83)	141.43 (5.57)	568.65 (22.39)
Average precipitation days (≥ 1.0 mm)	8.3	6.8	4.9	3.8	2.6	1.7	1.1	1.0	1.6	3.8	4.8	8.8	49.2
Average relative humidity (%)	63.7	64.0	65.7	67.5	67.8	68.2	69.2	68.0	63.1	59.3	58.6	63.9	64.9
Source: NOAA

== Places of interest ==
- Akkale (in the modern village of Tırtar) - the ruins of a large Byzantine building, possibly a palace, with baths, a water tank and large tank for storing olive oil.
- Alata Research Institute of Horticulture Research Institute, also offers picnic area
- Emirzeli - the ruins of an ancient city with traces of Hellenistic, Ancient Roman and Byzantine architecture including a church, a tower, water storage and houses.
- Çanakçı rock tombs - a group of rock-carved tombs dating back to the 2nd century AD.
- Çatıören - a Hellenistic city with temple of Hermes and necropolis.
- Öküzlü - the foundations of an ancient city, with a basilica, water tanks and monumental stones.
- Corycus and Kızkalesi - Findings in the necropolis inform us that the city of Corycus dates back the 4th century BC, in the 1st century they minted coinage here. The nearby castle of Kızkalesi Ghorgos was built on an island offshore in the 12th century.
- Elaiussa Sebaste - founded in the 2nd century, but thrived under the Romans and Byzantines, the site includes a necropolis, theatre and waterworks.
- Canytelis - occupied since the 3rd century BC, the site includes rock tombs and a Hellenistic period tower.
- Kanlıdivane - an ancient city around a big sinkhole dating back to ancient Olba Kingdom.
- Paşa Türbesi - a small Seljuk-era (13th century) tomb and there are many more remains from antiquity in the area.

== Composition ==
There are 71 neighbourhoods in Erdemli District:

- Adnan Menderes
- Akdeniz
- Akpınar
- Alata
- Alibeyli
- Arpaçbahşiş
- Arslanlı
- Ayaş
- Aydınlar
- Barbaros
- Batısandal
- Çamlı
- Çerçili
- Çeşmeli
- Çiftepınar
- Çiriş
- Dağlı
- Doğusandal
- Elbeyli
- Elvanlı
- Esenpınar
- Evdilek
- Fakılı
- Fatih
- Gücüş
- Güneyli
- Güzeloluk
- Hacıalanı
- Hacıhalilarpaç
- Harfilli
- Hüsametli
- İlemin
- Karaahmetli
- Karahıdırlı
- Karakeşli
- Karayakup
- Kargıcak
- Kargıpınarı
- Kayacı
- Kızılen
- Kızkalesi
- Kocahasanlı
- Koramşalı
- Kösbucağı
- Kösereli
- Koyuncu
- Kuşluca
- Küstülü
- Limonlu
- Merkez
- Pınarbaşı
- Şahna
- Sarıkaya
- Sarıyer
- Sinap
- Sıraç
- Sorgun
- Tabiye
- Tapureli
- Tırtar
- Tömük
- Toros
- Tozlu
- Türbe
- Üçtepe
- Üzümlü
- Veyselli
- Yağda
- Yarenler
- Yeniyurt
- Yüksek

== Gallery ==
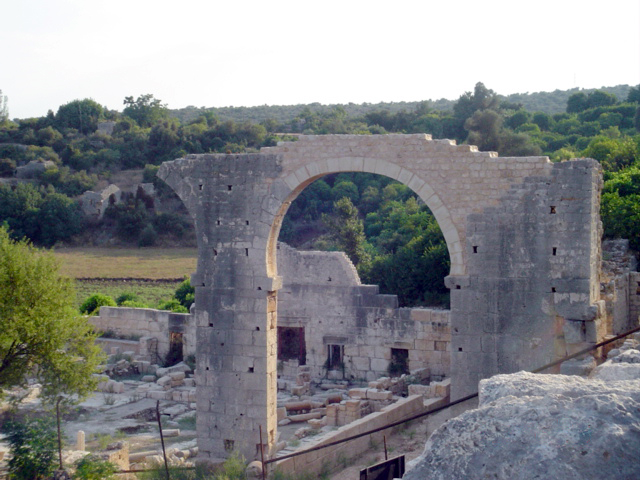
Elaiussa Sebaste

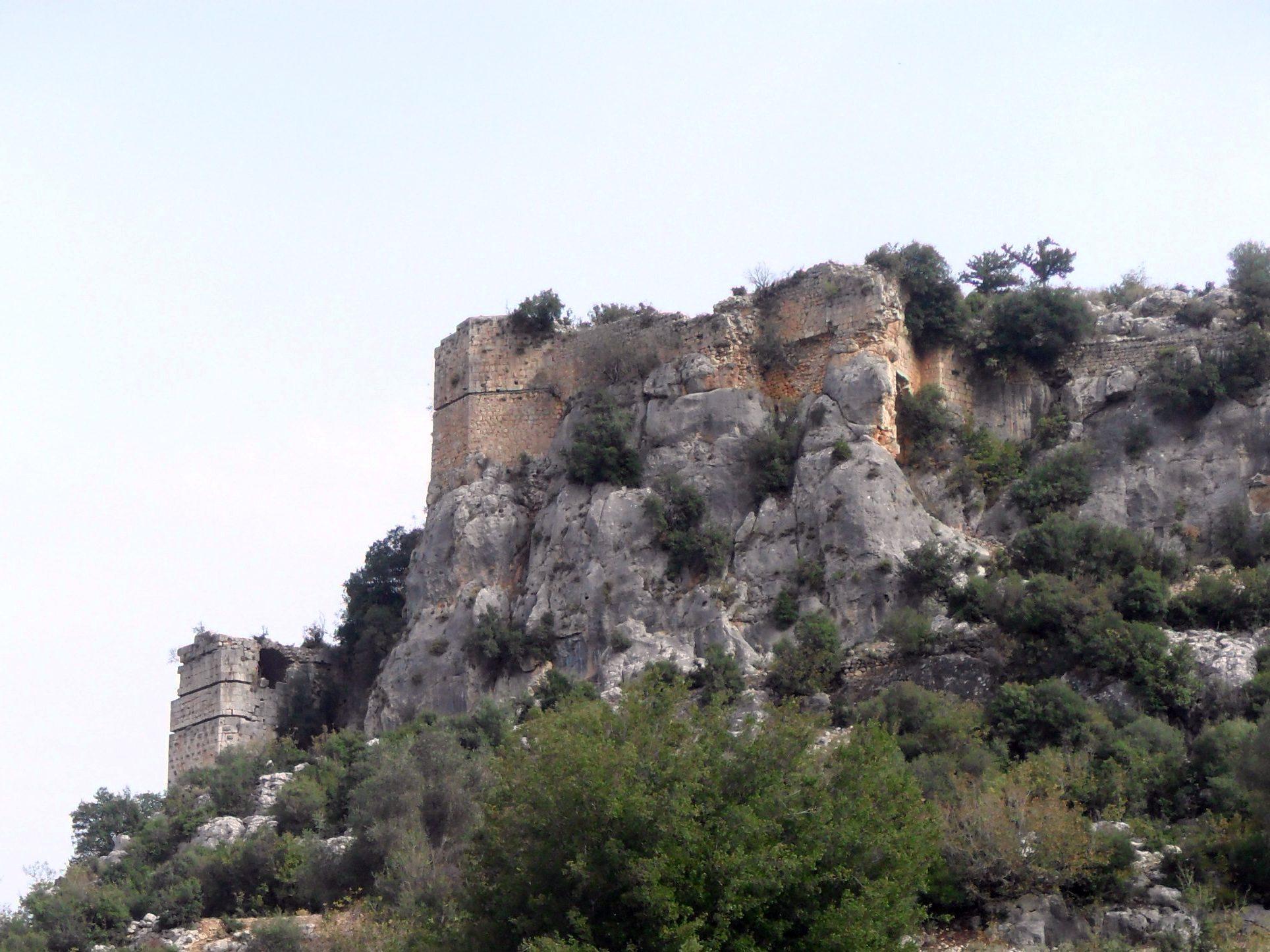
Dağlı Castle

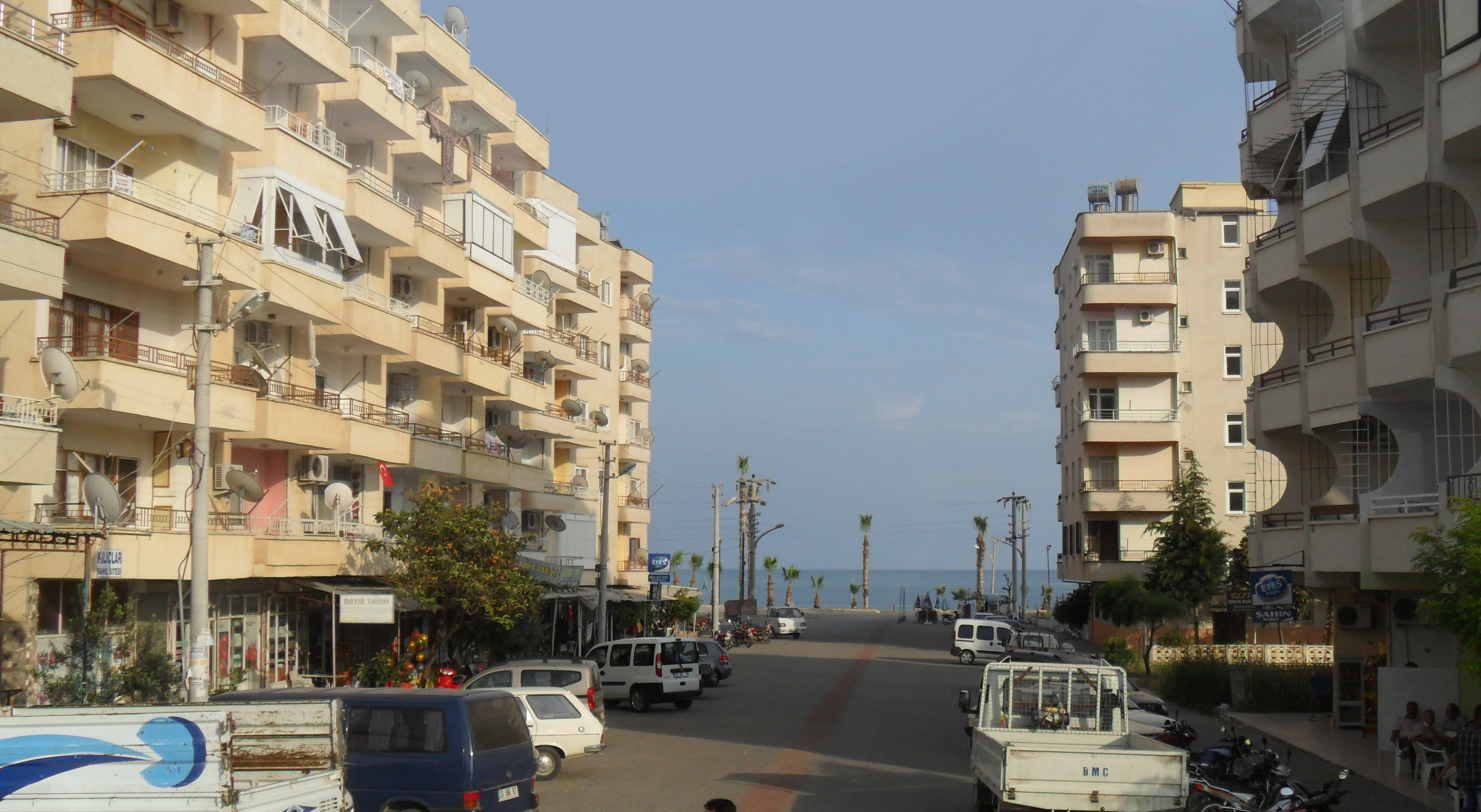
Kumkuyu

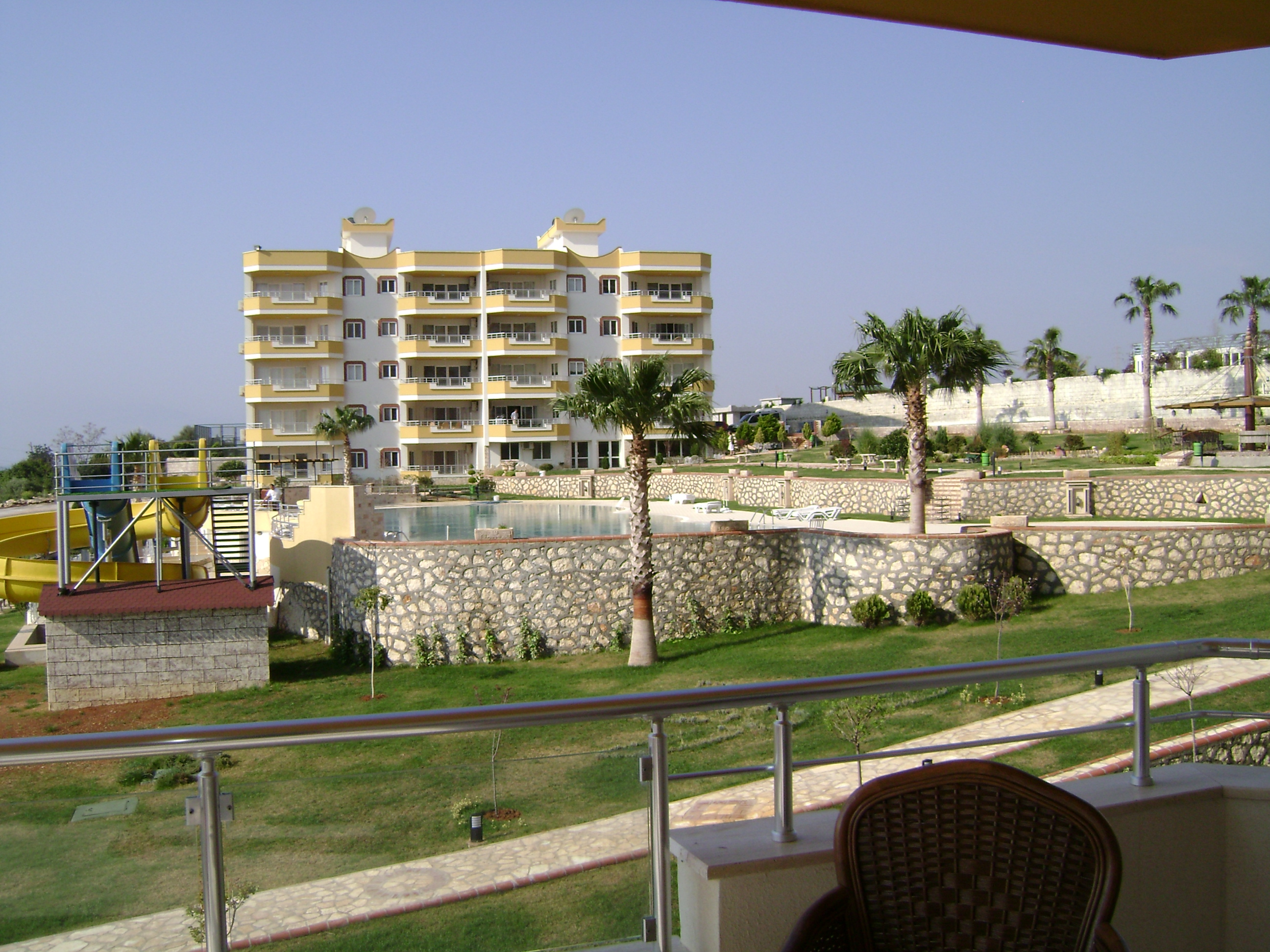
From Kumkuyu

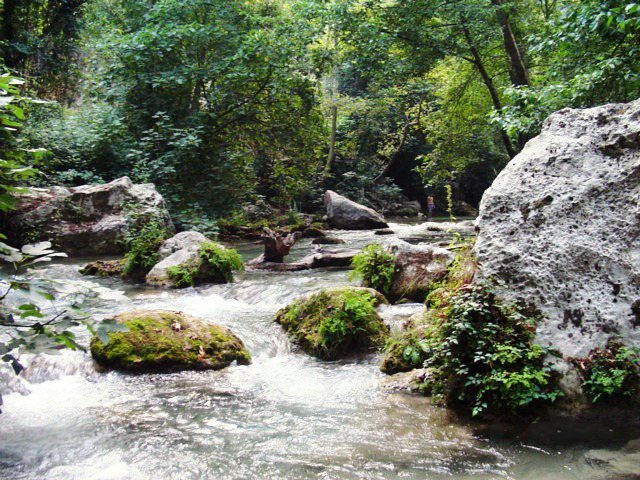
Kayacı valley
