= Olba Kingdom =

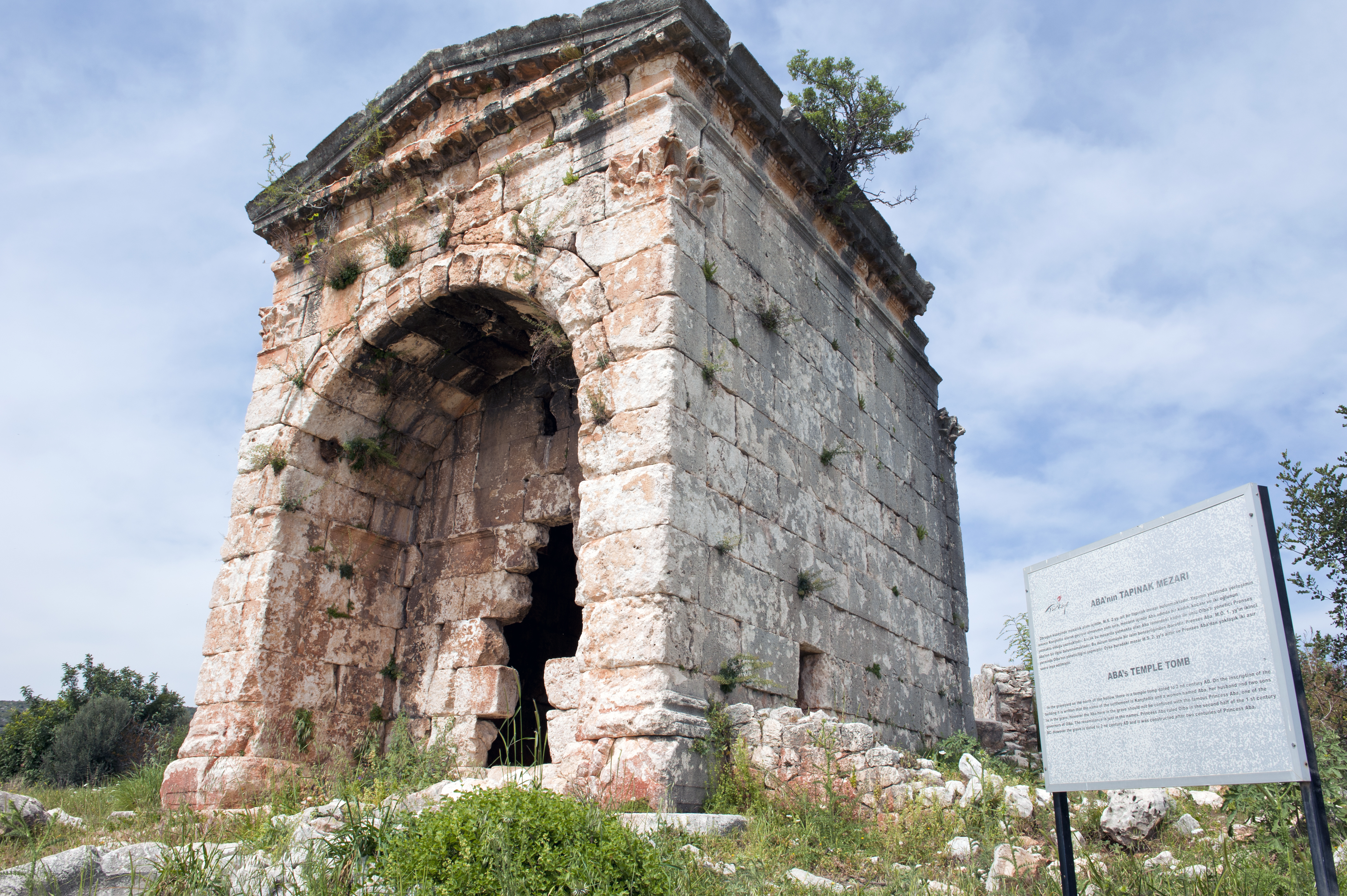
Mausoleum of Queen Aba

Olba Kingdom was an ancient kingdom in south Anatolia. It was a vassal of the Seleucid and Roman Empires.

== Geography ==
The kingdom was a small state situated in Cilicia Trachea (present Mersin Province, Turkey). It was bounded by the Toros Mountains to the north, the Mediterranean Sea to the south, the Lamos River to the east and the river Calycadnus (Göksu) to the west. Archaeologists today refer to this area as Olba Territorium. Its capital was on a plateau named Uğuralanı, a settlement to the northeast of Uzuncaburç (Diokaisareia).

== History ==
Its kings were also priests and the kingdom was an example of "temple state". Although a minor political power it was a prosperous state. The origin of its wealth was olive oil and grapes.

It flourished during the Hellenistic Age. During the time of severe Cilician piracy, it lost its ports and its economy suffered. Ksenophanes was one of the pirates. After he was killed, his daughter Aba (who was raised as a priestess) married the king and became the de facto ruler of Olba state between 43 BC to 39 BC. Aba paid obeisance to Cleopatra of Egypt and Marcus Antonius of the Roman Republic. Olba once again flourished under Roman rule. However, after Cappadocian king Archelaus was appointed as the governor of Cilicia in 25 BC, Olba lost its semi-independence and thereafter was incorporated into the Isauria province of the Roman Empire.

== Archaeology of Olba ==
Below is the list of archaeological remains in Olba Territorium (including later additions)

- Adamkayalar
- Akkale
- Athena relief
- Canbazlı ruins
- Corycus
- Çanakçı rock tombs
- Çatıören
- Elaiussa Sebaste
- Emirzeli
- Gömeç
- Hisarin Castle
- Imbriogon (Demircili)
- Işıkkale
- Kabaçam
- Karakabaklı
- Lamas Aqueduct
- Mancınık Castle
- Meydan Castle
- Mezgitkale
- Olba Aqueduct
- Öküzlü ruins
- Pasha's Tomb
- Sinekkale
- Tapureli ruins
- Taşgeçit Bridge
- Uzuncaburç (Diokaesareia)
- Üçayaklı ruins
- Veyselli rock reliefs
- Yanıkhan
- Yeniyurt Castle

== Gallery ==
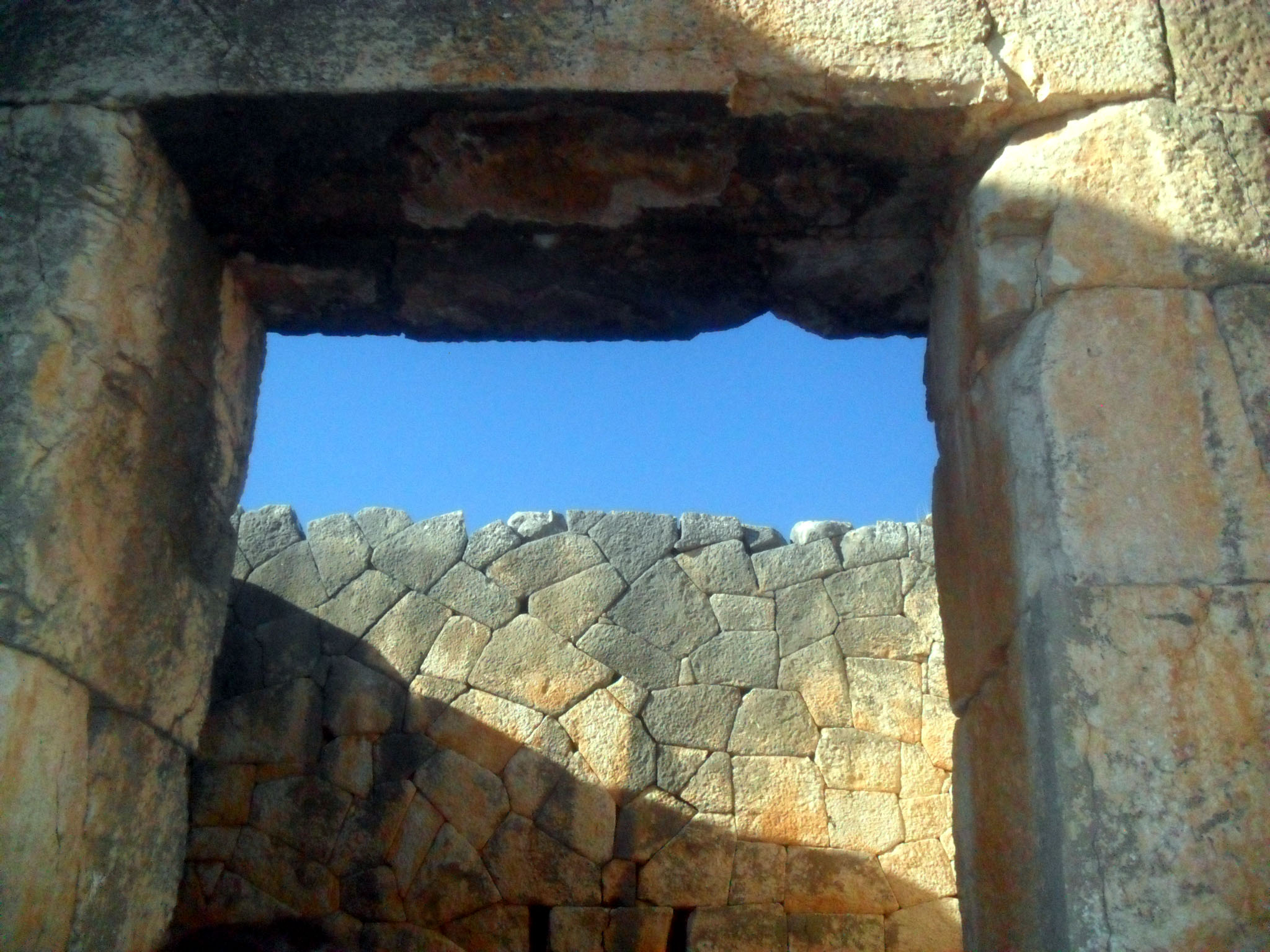
Hermes temple in Çatıören

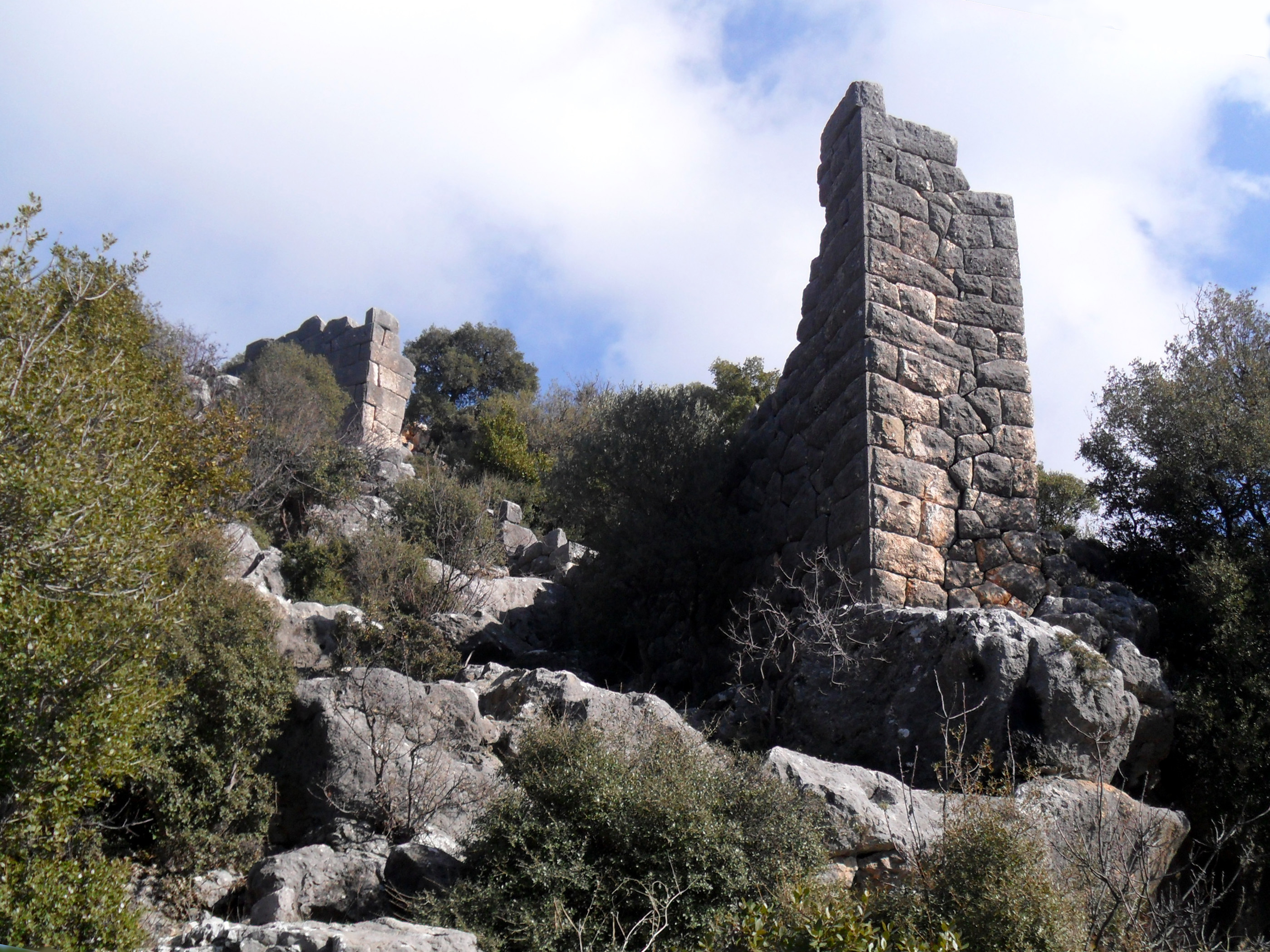
Mancınık Castle

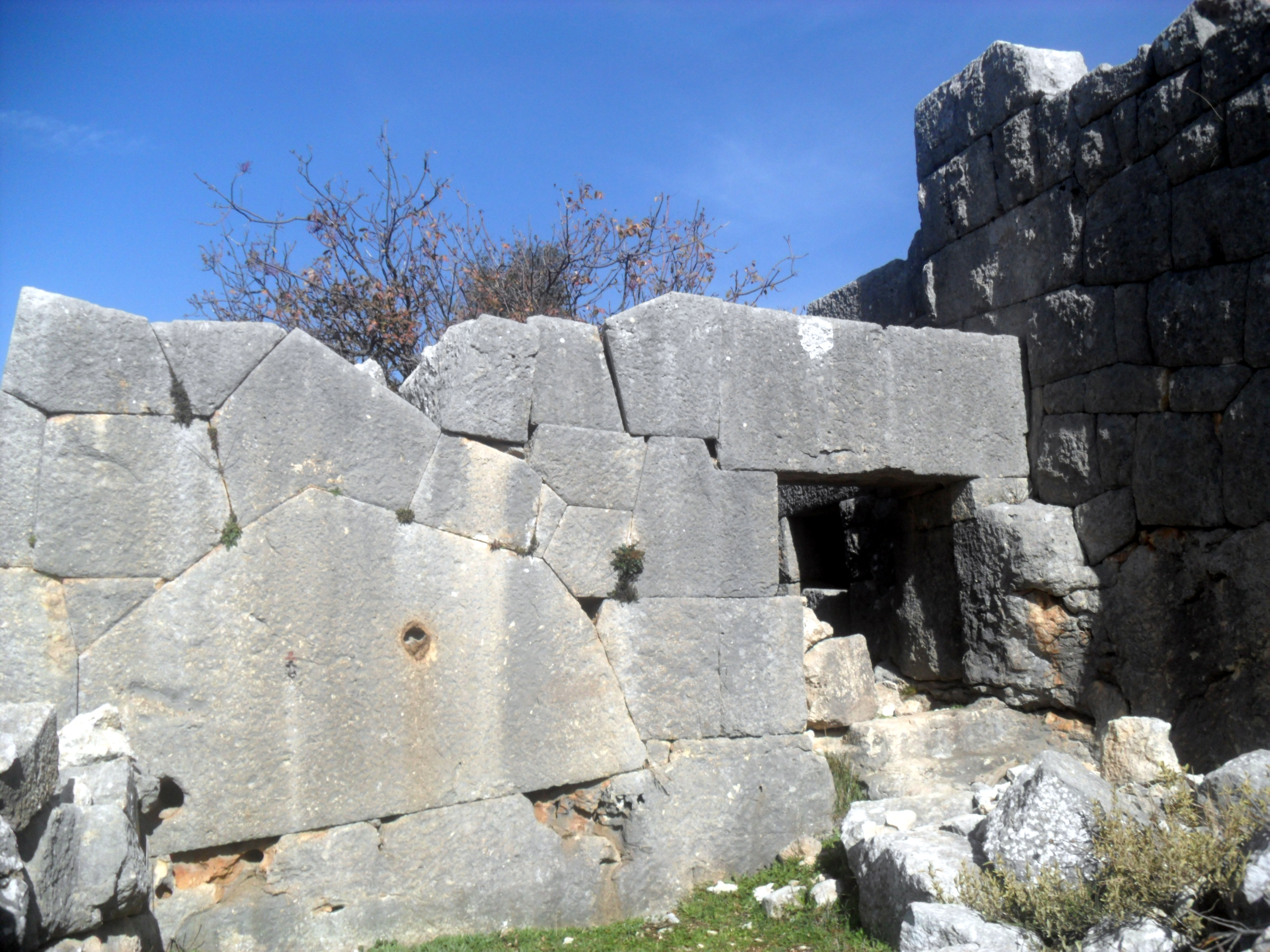
Castle walls of Meydankale

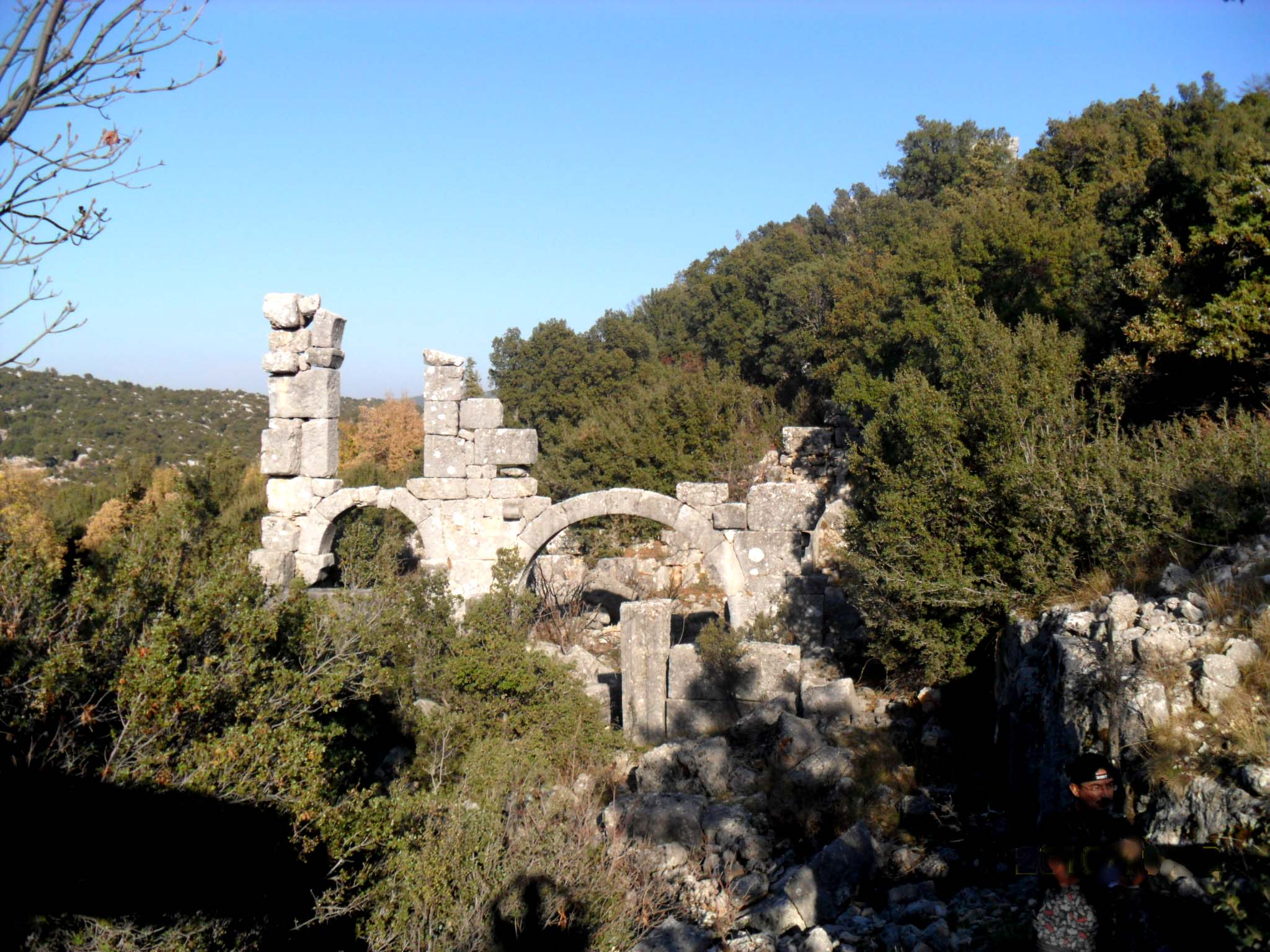
Tapureli

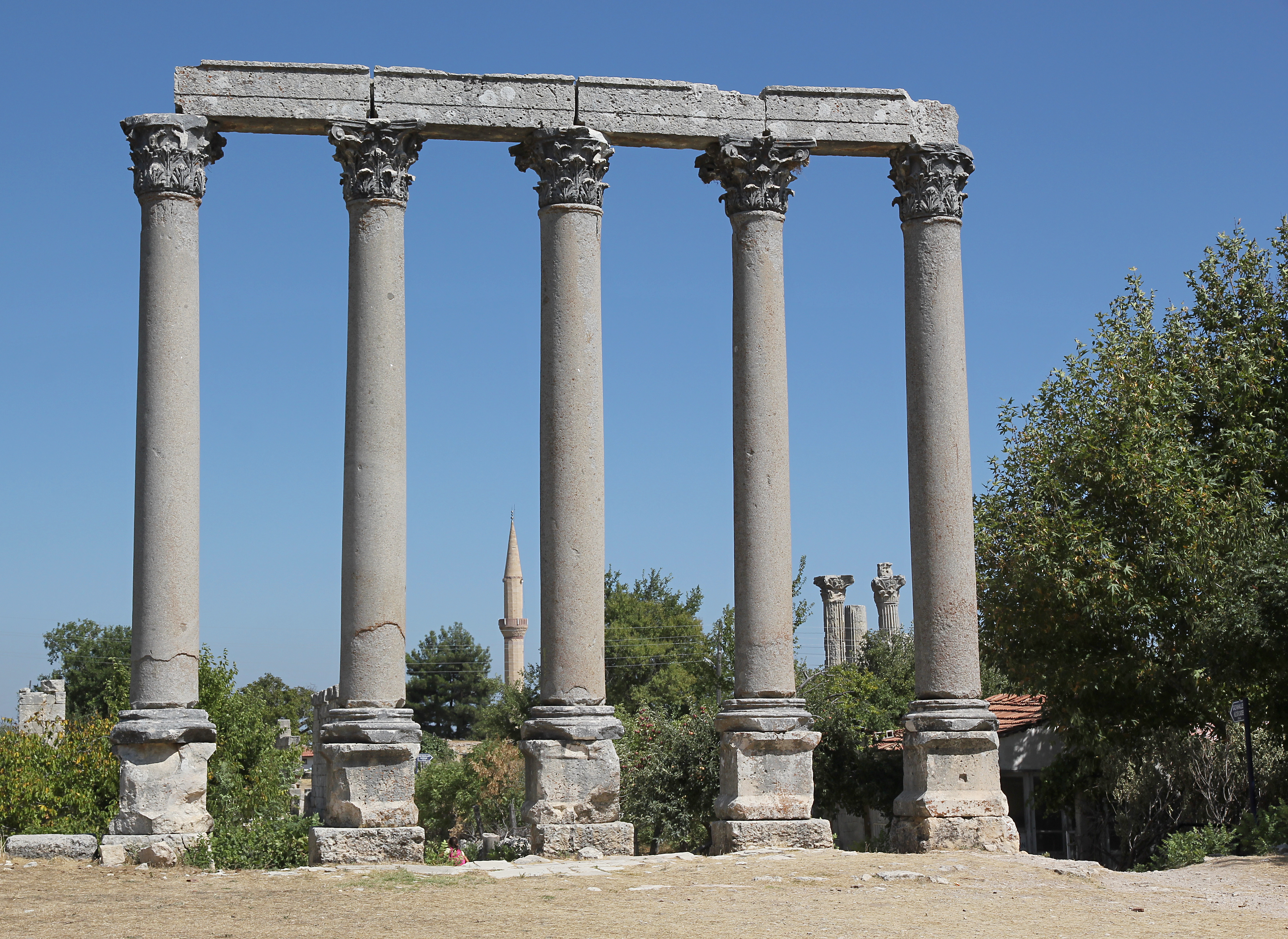
Tyche temple in Diokaesareia
