= Tower of Gömeç =

Tower in Mersin Province, Turkey

- Mersin Province in Turkey
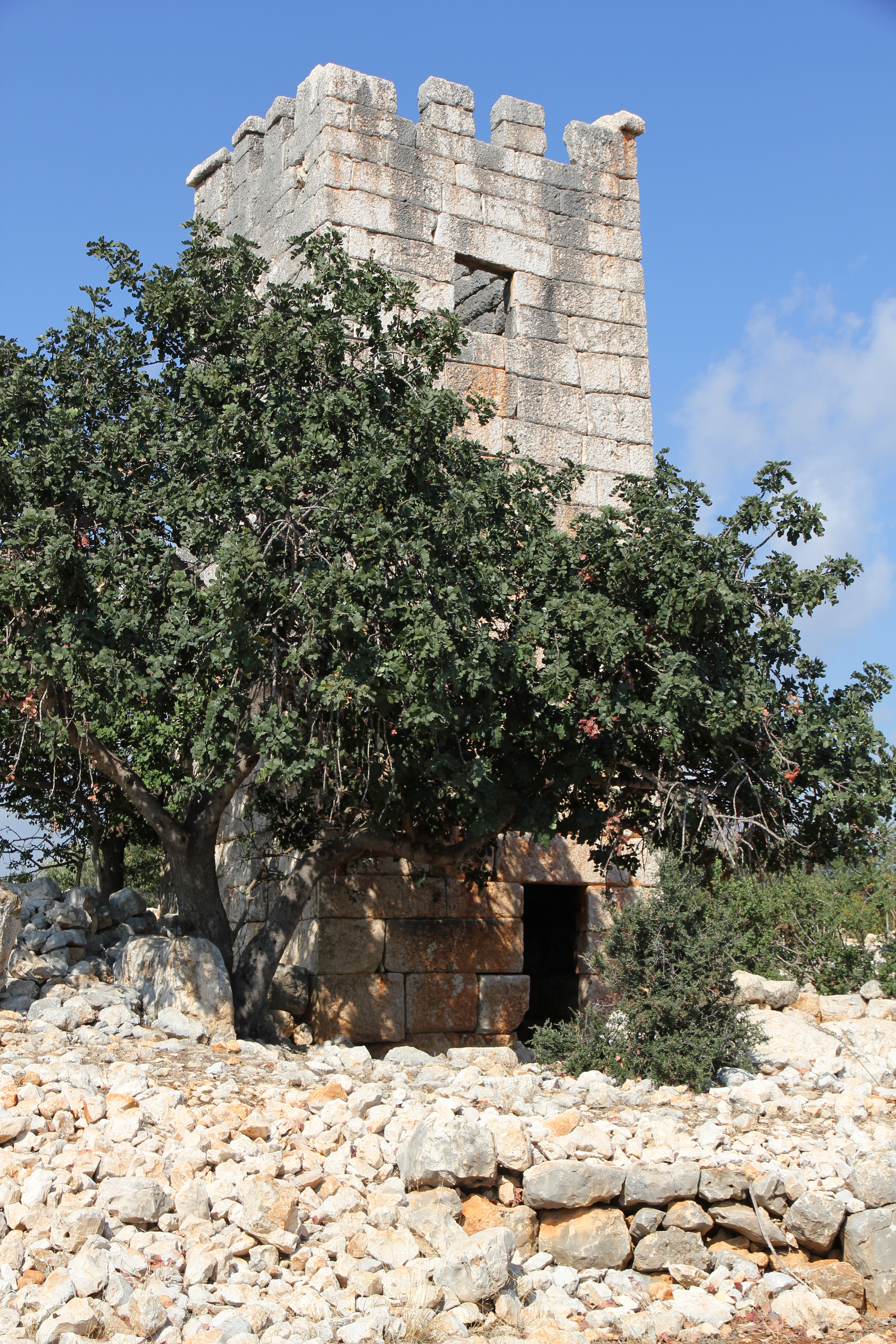
- Tower from the south

Location
- Coordinates: 36°29′25″N 34°8′8″E

The Tower of Gömeç (Gömeç Kalesi) is a Roman watch tower in Cilicia, present-day Mersin Province in southern Turkey.

== Location ==
The watchtower is located in the district of Erdemli in Mersin province, about three kilometres north of Kızkalesi and 20 kilometres southwest of Erdemli. Along with remnants of walls, it stands atop a 240-metre-high (790 ft) hill in the mountainous hinterland of Kızkalesi (the ancient Korykos), on a road which extends from there to the east side of Şeytan Deresi valley, then to the cliff graves of Adamkayalar, through Hüseyinler to Cambazlı, terminating at Uzuncaburç (ancient Olba). There are a number of other towers in the area: the older tower of Gücük is about 200 metres away, the Tower of Sarayın is two kilometres to the southeast, and the Tower of Akkum is three kilometres to the southwest.

== Description ==
The tower, which is almost completely intact, is 11.32 metres high. At ground level it has a floor area of 4.7 x 4.7 metres, which decreases to 4.2 x 4.2 metres at the top. It is built from stone blocks without mortar, using the pseudo-isodomum technique, in which the stones of each layer are the same size, but the size of the stones in different layers may differ. The height of the blocks varies between 80 and 30 centimetres. The door is located on the south side and measures 1.9 x 0.96 metres. Above it, on the exterior wall, there is a series of 13 beam holes, which were added some time after construction in order to support a porch.

There are four floors. On the south side of the first floor there is a window, which has been bricked up; above it, on the second floor there is a slit-window and on the third there is a square window, measuring about 85 centremetres on each side. There were also windows in the east and west walls of the third floor, which were later sealed up with small blocks. There is still a slit window in the west wall of the first floor. There are no openings in the north wall on any floor.

The door opened inwards and to the right. The holes for the anchor plate and the door hinges are visible. It was bolted on the inside with a beam and two bars and by a single beam on the outside. On the inside walls of the tower, there are beam holes for the floorbeams of the four levels - the lowest are directly above the door lintel. On the first, third and fourth floors, the beams ran north–south, on the second floor they ran east–west. The top floor was the viewing platform, which was surrounded by two layers of stone blocks and crenellations. These are almost completely intact, with the saddle-shaped tops of the merlons still preserved in some cases.

Around the tower are the ruined walls of various buildings, including an olive oil press.

== Towers in Cilicia ==
In Cilicia, particularly in the area between the river Kalykadnos (modern Göksu) and the Lamos (modern Limonlu), there are many Late Hellenistic and Roman towers. Some of these were free-standing, some were parts of settlements or fortresses, but all appear to have served as watch towers. They protected against attack, especially from the pirates, who had settled in the region during the transition from Seleucid to Roman control of the area in the second century BC. Five free-standing towers in the isodomic style (Akkum, Boyan, Gömeç, Sarayın und Yalama) cluster around Korykos and Elaiussa Sebaste, which were both the main city of the area at different times. At the same time, they appear to have served as homes and storehouses. The lower stories were dark and therefore could be used to store foodstuffs such as cereals, while also serving as a place of refuge for the inhabitants of the surrounding area. The crenellations of the upper platform offered protection from archers. On account of the similar style of the different towers and the fact that they are located within three to five kilometres of one another, it can be concluded that they were built as a group, perhaps intended to communicate with one another using signals. They were probably built between the end of Seleukid rule in 133 BC, the defeat of the pirates by Pompey in 65 BC, and (at the latest) the conversion of the area into a Roman province in AD 74.

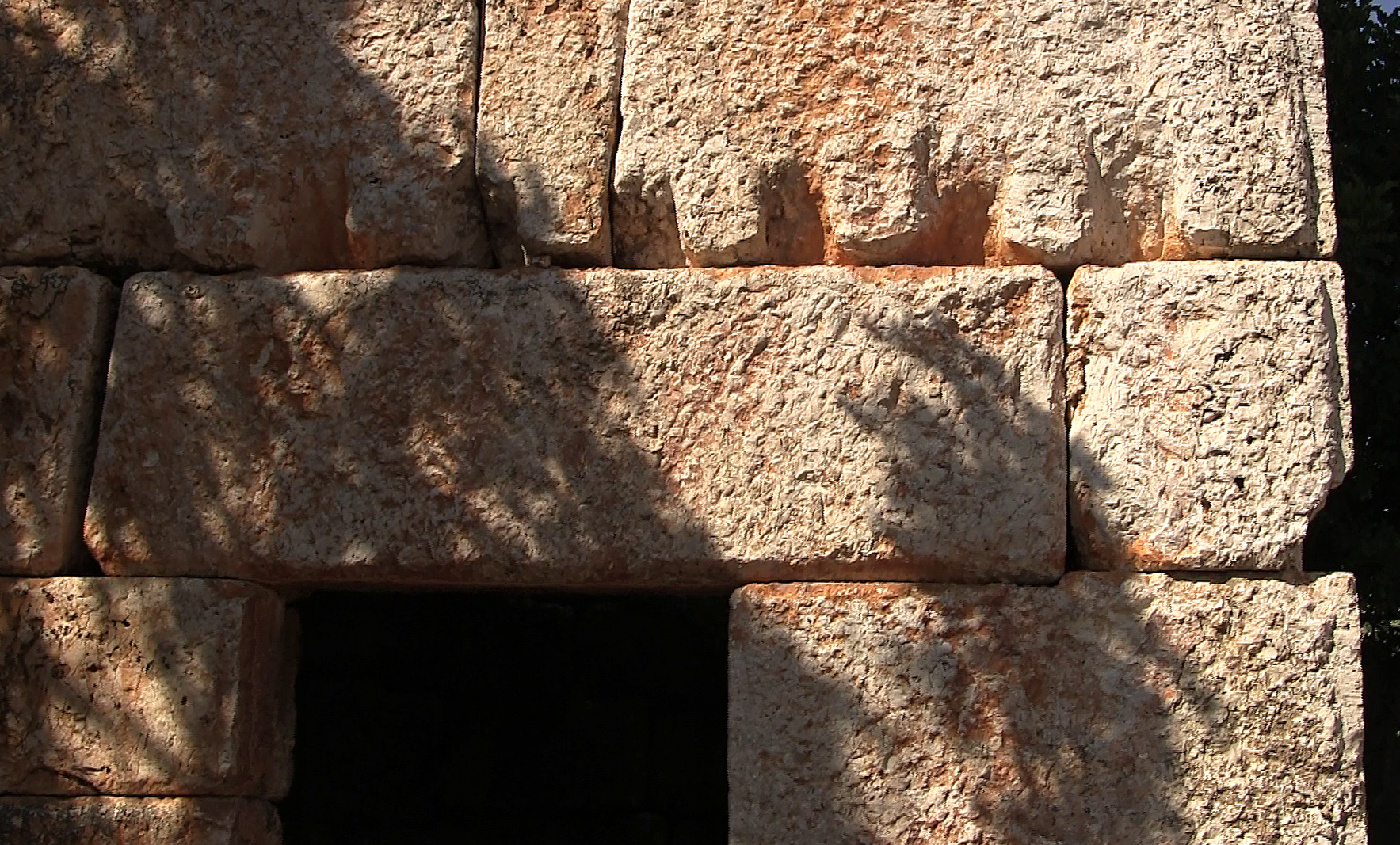
Door with holes for beams

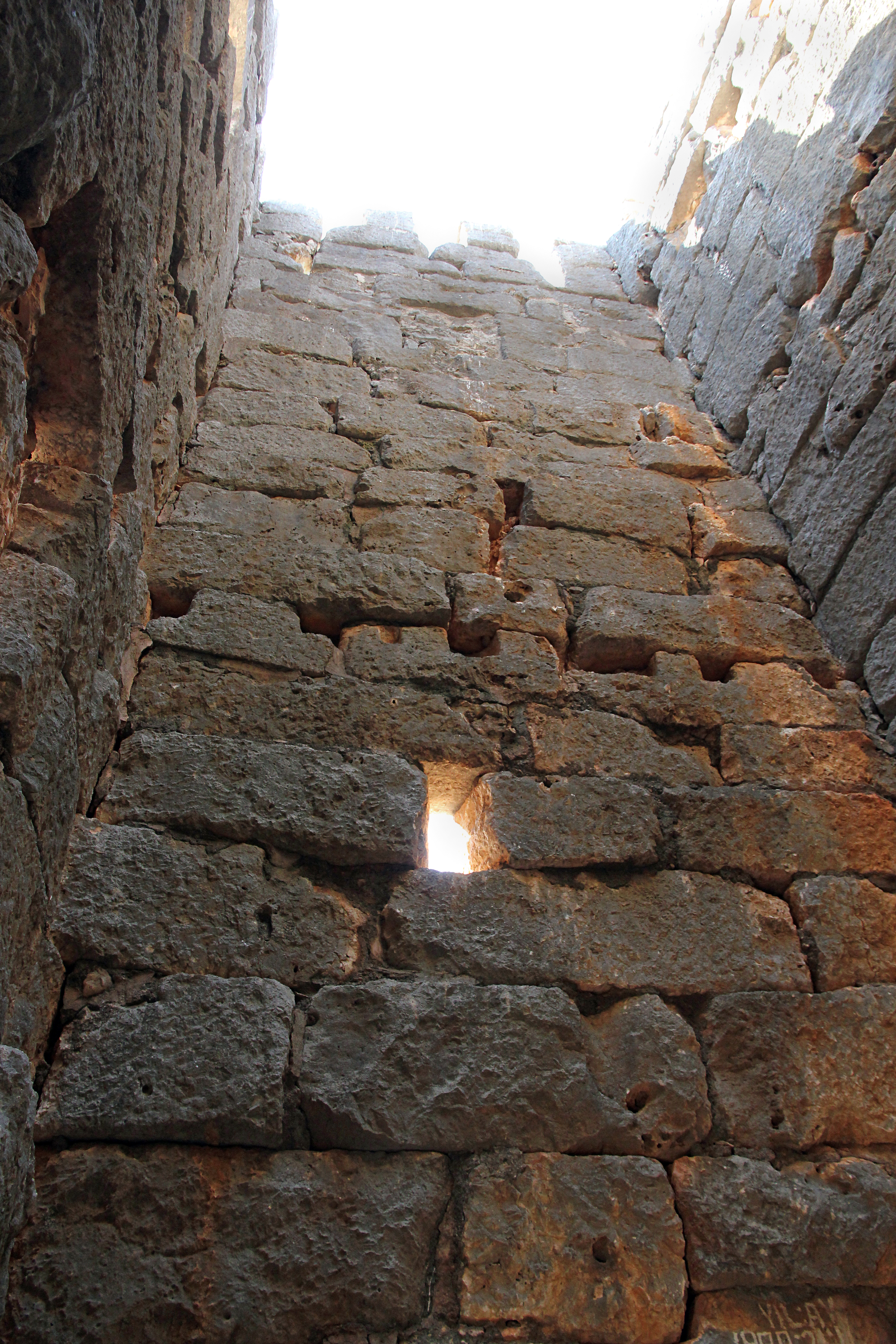
West wall interior with beam holes

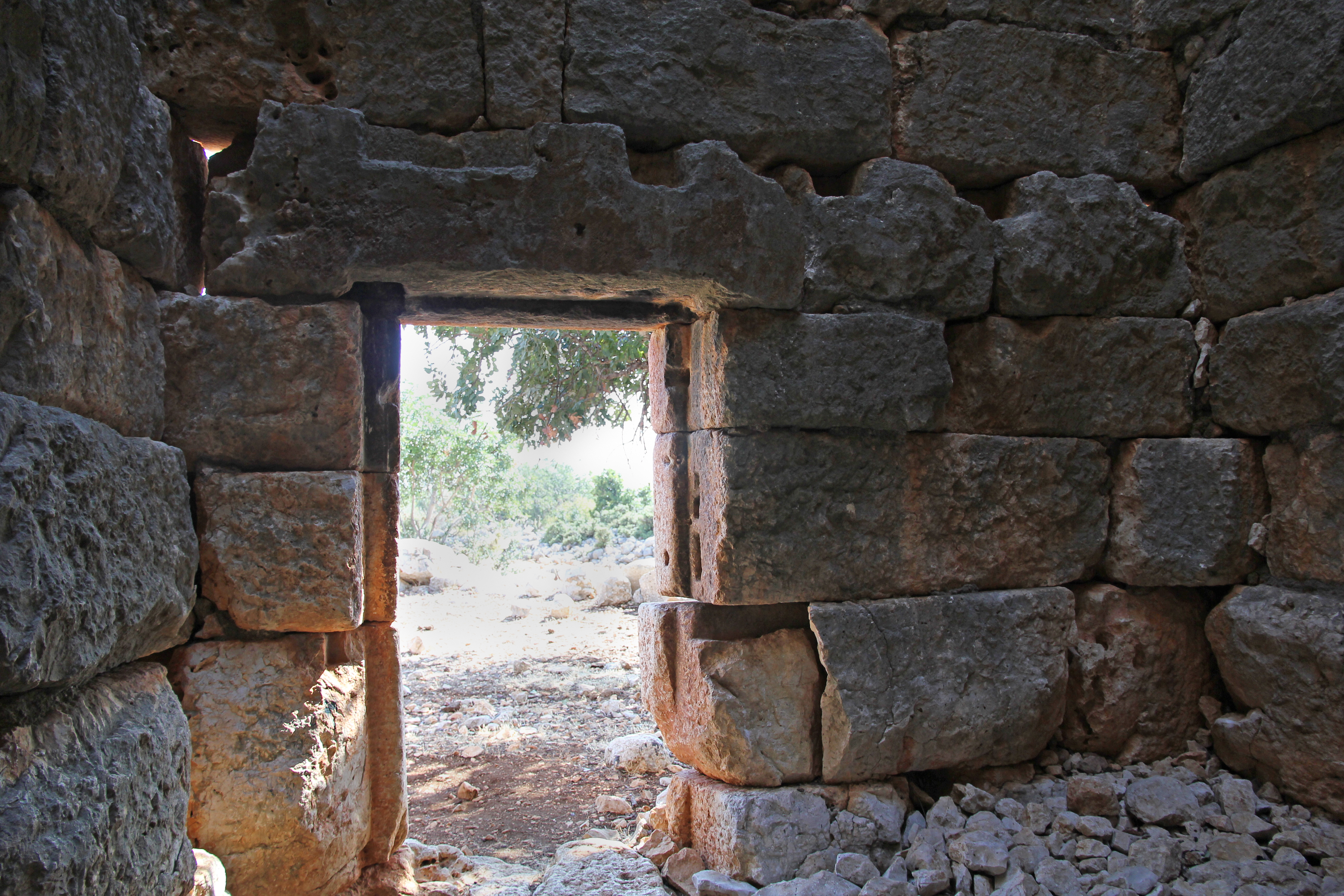
Door from inside

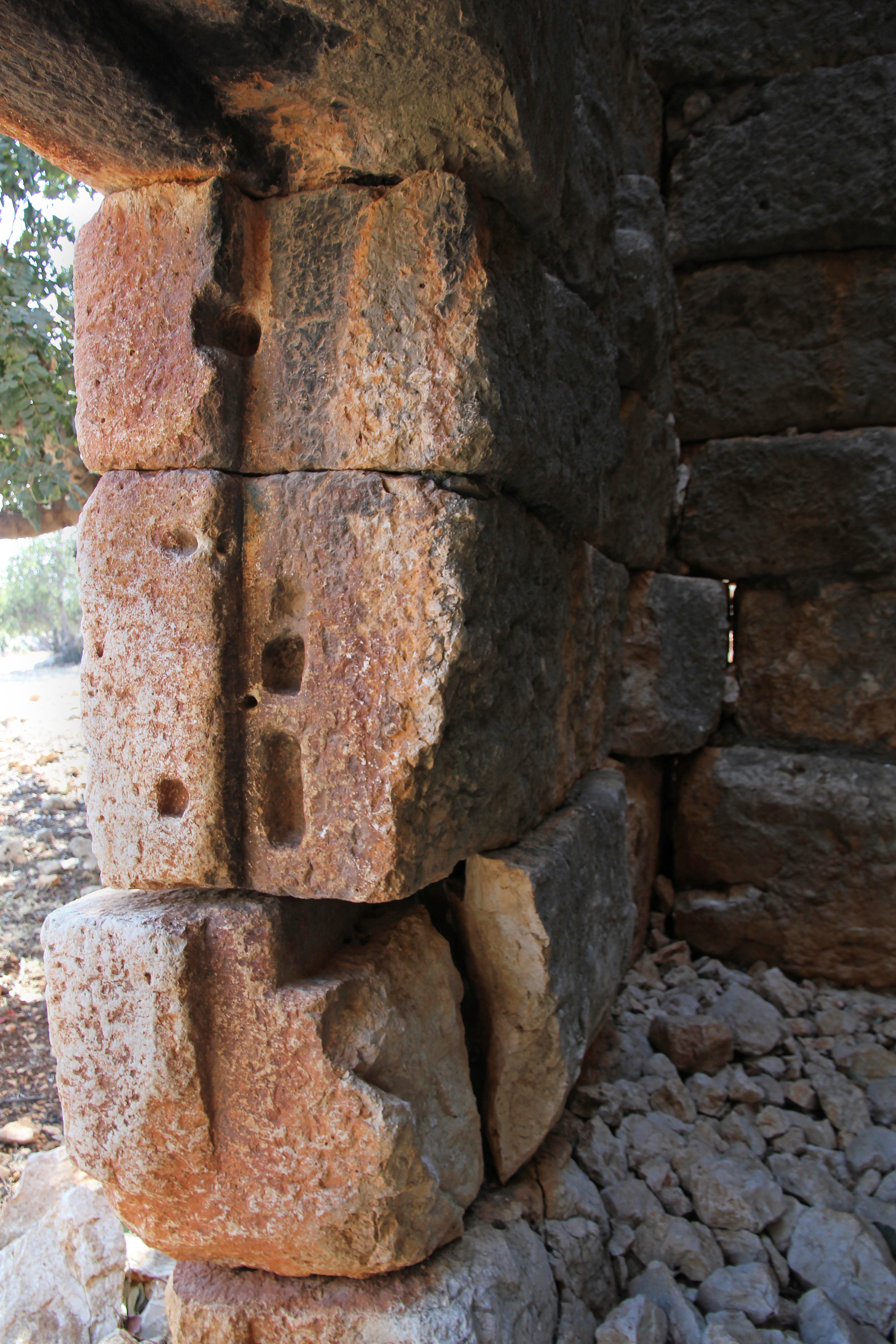
Edge of door

== Bibliography ==
- Josef Keil, Adolf Wilhelm: Denkmäler aus dem rauhen Kilikien, (= MAMA 3), Manchester 1931, pp. 119–120 Tab. 45 Fig. 146
- Serra Durugönül: Türme und Siedlungen im Rauhen Kilikien. Asia Minor Studien Band 28. Rudolf Habelt, Bonn 1998 ISBN 3-7749-2840-1 pp. 66–74
