= Olba Aqueduct =

Roman aqueduct in Mersin Province, southern Turkey

- Olba Su kemeri
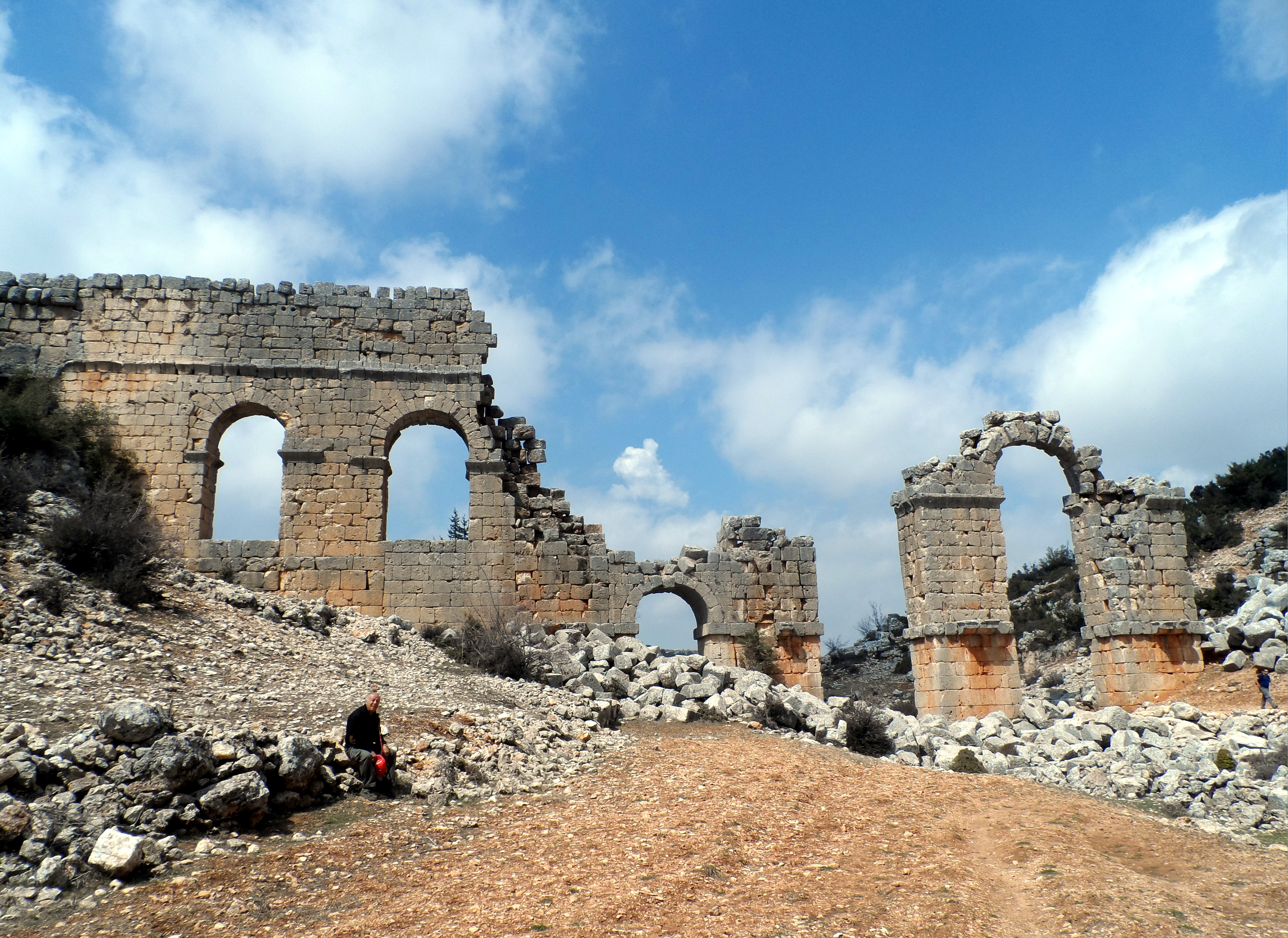
- Aqueduct from the south
- Interactive map of the Olba Aqueduct area

General information
- Type: Aqueduct
- Architectural style: Ancient
- Location: Olba (ancient city), Mersin, Turkey
- Coordinates: 36°35′10″N 33°58′8″E
- Opened: 199
- Owner: Turkish Republic

Technical details
- Material: Granite

Olba Aqueduct is a ruined Roman aqueduct in Mersin Province, southern Turkey.

The aqueduct is in Silifke ilçe (district) of Mersin Province at 36°35′10″N 33°58′08″E. It is about 4 kilometres (2.5 mi) east of the sacred place of Diokaesareia (now called Uzuncaburç town) and close to the capital of Olba Kingdom (a local kingdom).

The aqueduct was commissioned by the Roman emperor Septimius Severus (193–211) in 199. On the inscription it reads "the city of Olba residents". The aqueduct underwent repairs during the reign of Byzantine emperor Justinian I (527–565) in 566.

The aqueduct is mostly demolished. A part of it can be seen to the west of the agora ruins. It is a double tier aqueduct. Its height is 25 metres (82 ft) and its length over a valley next to the city is 150 metres (490 ft). There are observation towers around the aqueduct. The source of the watercourse is Limonlu River also known as Lamas River around the village of Kızılgeçit which is about 8 kilometres (5.0 mi) to the northeast.

== See also ==
- List of aqueducts in the Roman Empire
- List of Roman aqueducts by date
- Ancient Roman technology
- Roman engineering
