= Uzuncaburç (Diokaisareia) =

Archaeological site in Turkey

Diokaisareia
- Uzuncaburç
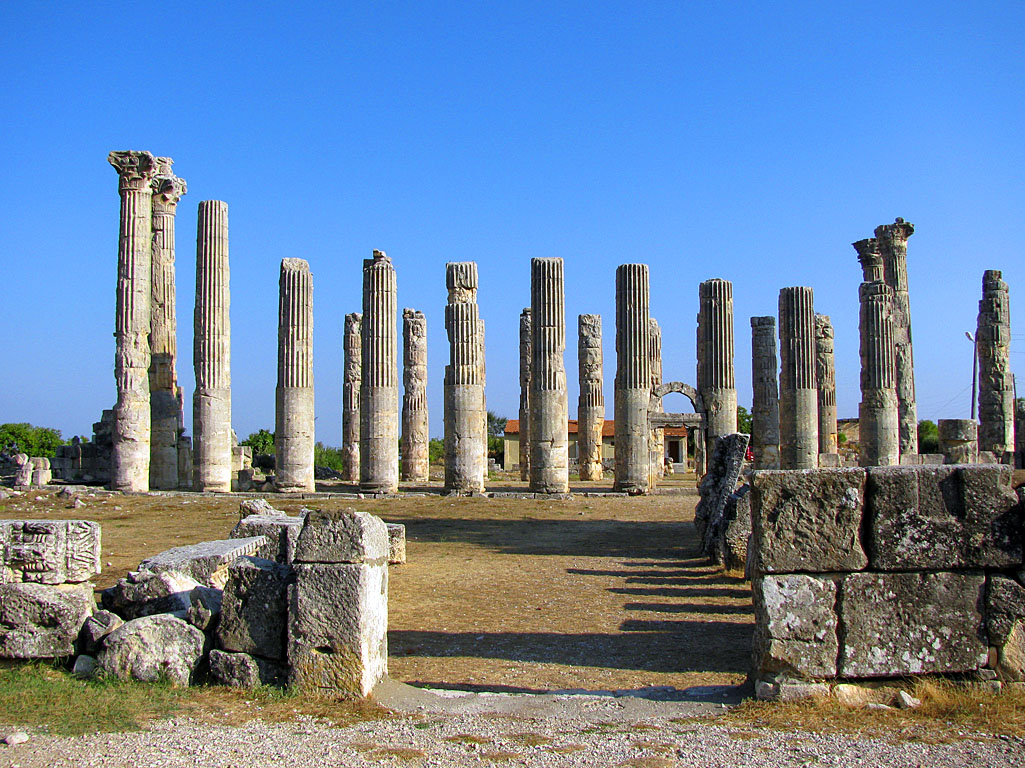
- Zeus temple

- Location within Turkey
- 36°35′N 33°56′E
- Type: Sacred place
- Cultures: Hellenistic, Roman
- Location: Silifke, Mersin Province, Turkey
- Region: Cilicia Trachea

Site notes
- Height: 1,200 metres (3,900 ft)
- Condition: In ruins

Uzuncaburç is an archaeological site in Mersin Province, Turkey, containing the remnants of the ancient city of Diokaisareia or Diocaesarea (Greek: Διοκαισάρεια).

== Location ==
Uzuncaburç is in the rural area of Silifke ilçe (district). (Silifke was known as Seleukeia during the Hellenistic age) distance from Silifke is 30 kilometres (19 mi) and from Mersin is 104 kilometres (65 mi). The visitors from Silifke follow the road to north and then to east. The visitors from Mersin follow the highway D.400 to the west up to the west of Susanoğlu where they turn north.

== History ==
During the Hellenistic period, the area of Diokaisareia was a part of the Seleucid Empire. The region around Uzuncaburç was controlled by the local kings and queens of Olba on behalf of the Seleucid Empire. Uzuncaburç was the sacred place of the Olba people, but their main settlement was in Ura,4 kilometres (2.5 mi) east of the site of Diokaisareia. However, after the area was captured by the Roman Empire, Emperor Vespasian (r. 69–79) transformed the sacred place to a city, with the right to issue its coins. During the Christian age, most of the temples in Diokaisareia were converted to churches.

During the Middle Ages the city faded away. During the Ottoman Empire, the Turkmen people established their own settlement to the east of the ancient site and named their settlement after the Hellenistic tower Uzuncaburç, which means "tall bastion" in Turkish. Now both the town and the ancient site shares the same name.

== Archaeology ==
Main structures of interest are the following

Within the—now vanished—city walls;

- Ceremonial gate: It is at the east side of the site. Only six columns survive. The radius of each column is 1 metre (3 ft 3 in) and the height is 7 metres (23 ft). There are consoles in each column which were used to erect small statues.
- Main gate: It is at the northwest of the site. There is one monumental gate and two auxiliary gates in each side.
- Zeus Temple : It is in the middle of the site. It is a peripteros type temple. 36 columns survive. It was probably commissioned by Seleucus I Nicator (r. 305–281 BC).
- Tyche Temple:It is at the west end of the site. It is an architrave over five columns each 6 metres (20 ft) high. According to an inscription it was commissioned by Oppius and Kyria.

Out of the city walls;

- Theatre: It is to the east. It is a Roman structure and was built during the reign of Marcus Aurelius (r 161–180) and Lucius Verus (r 161–169)
- Hellenistic tower: It is close to the north east corner of the walled site. The base area is 16*13 m^{2} and the height is 23 metres (75 ft) It was commissioned by a certain Teukros, the son of Tarkyaris. It was probably used as a hiding place of the people during the wars.
- Mausoleum: It is out of the walled area and to the south east. Its base area is 5.5*5.5 m^{2} The height is 15 metres (49 ft).
- Necropolis: It is located in the valley to the north.

== Museum status ==
The site is under the control of Ministry of Culture and Tourism. The site is open to visits. As of 2018, admission charge was 6 Turkish lira. The visiting hours 8.00 to 18.45 (summer) and 8.00 to 16.45 (winter)

== Gallery ==
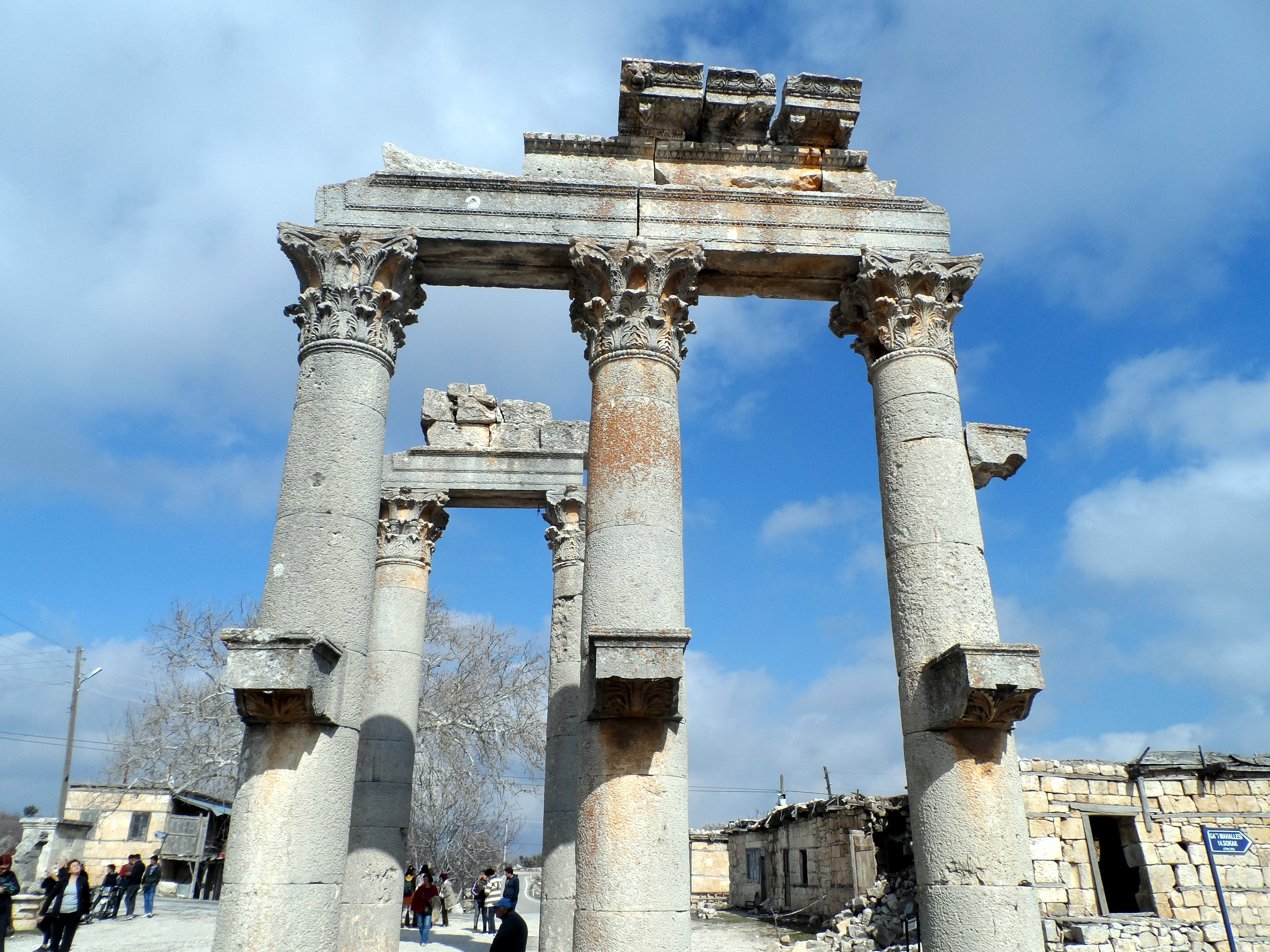
Ceremonial gate

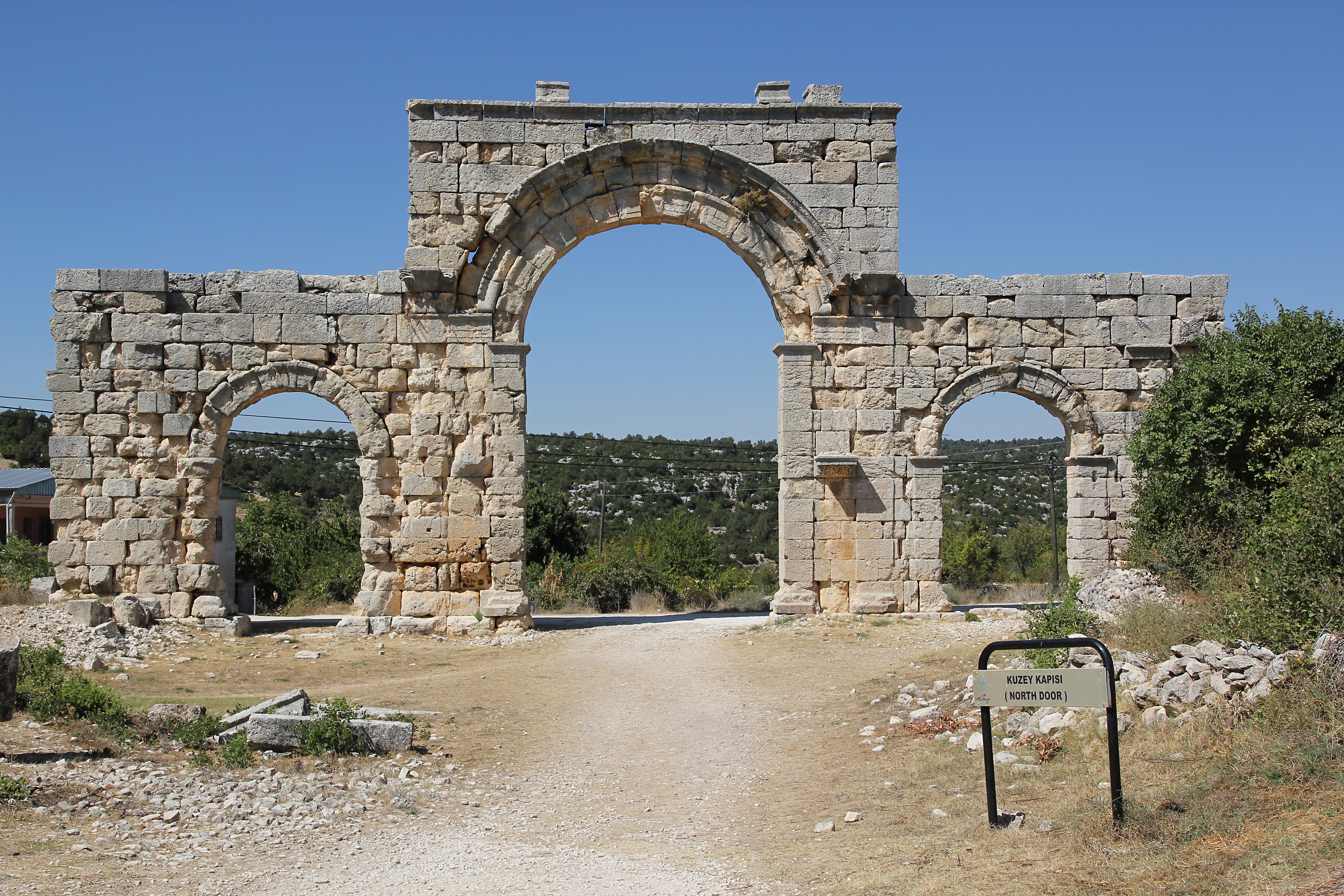
Main gate

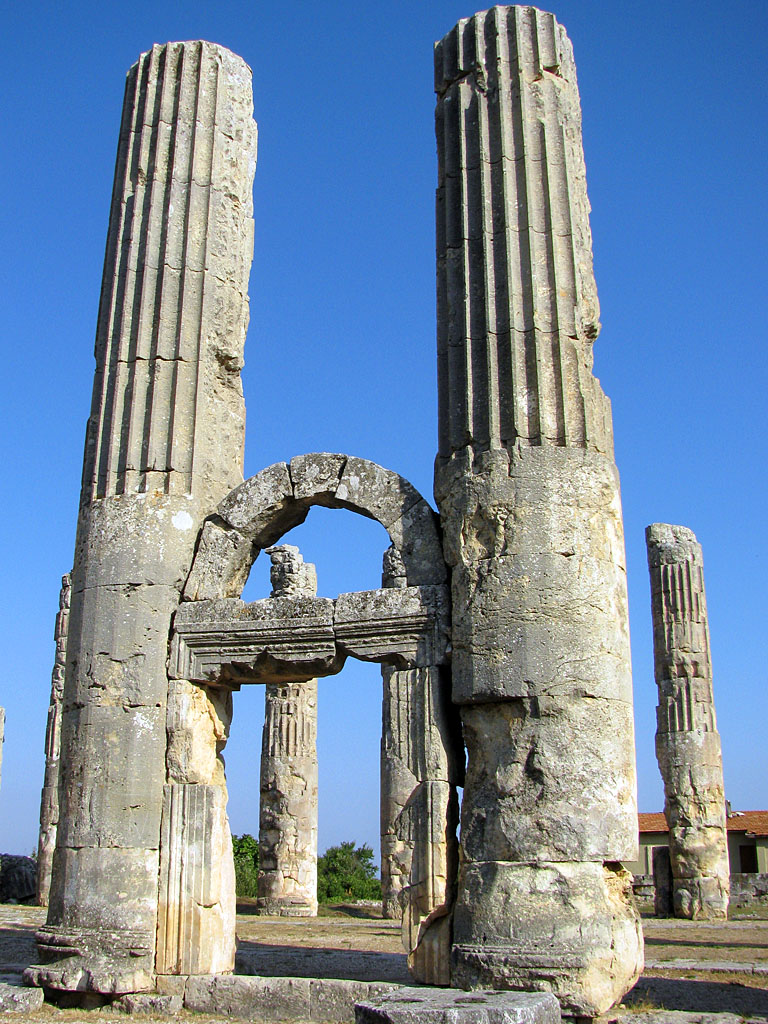
Gate of the Zeus temple

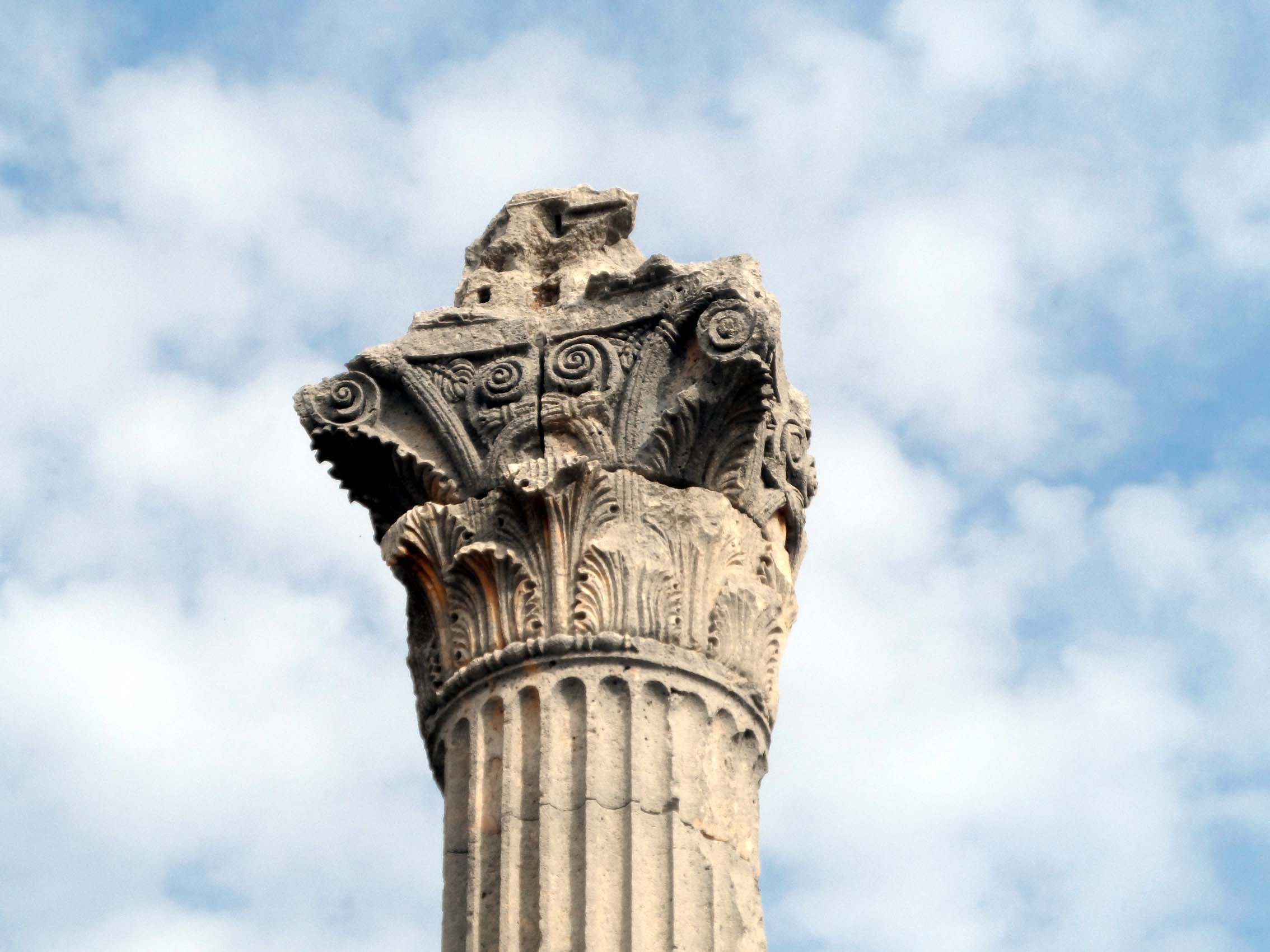
Corinthian columnhead

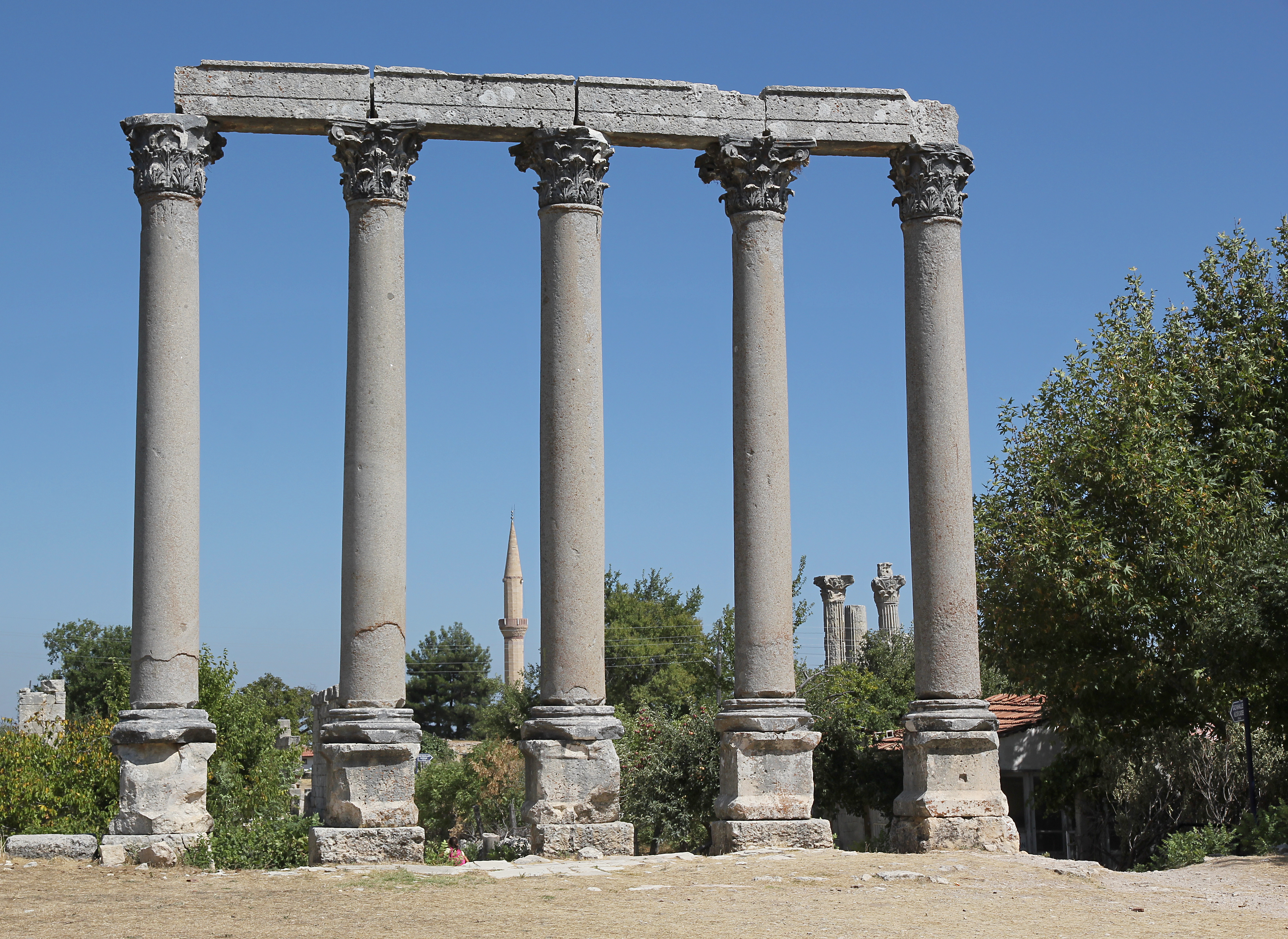
Tyche temple

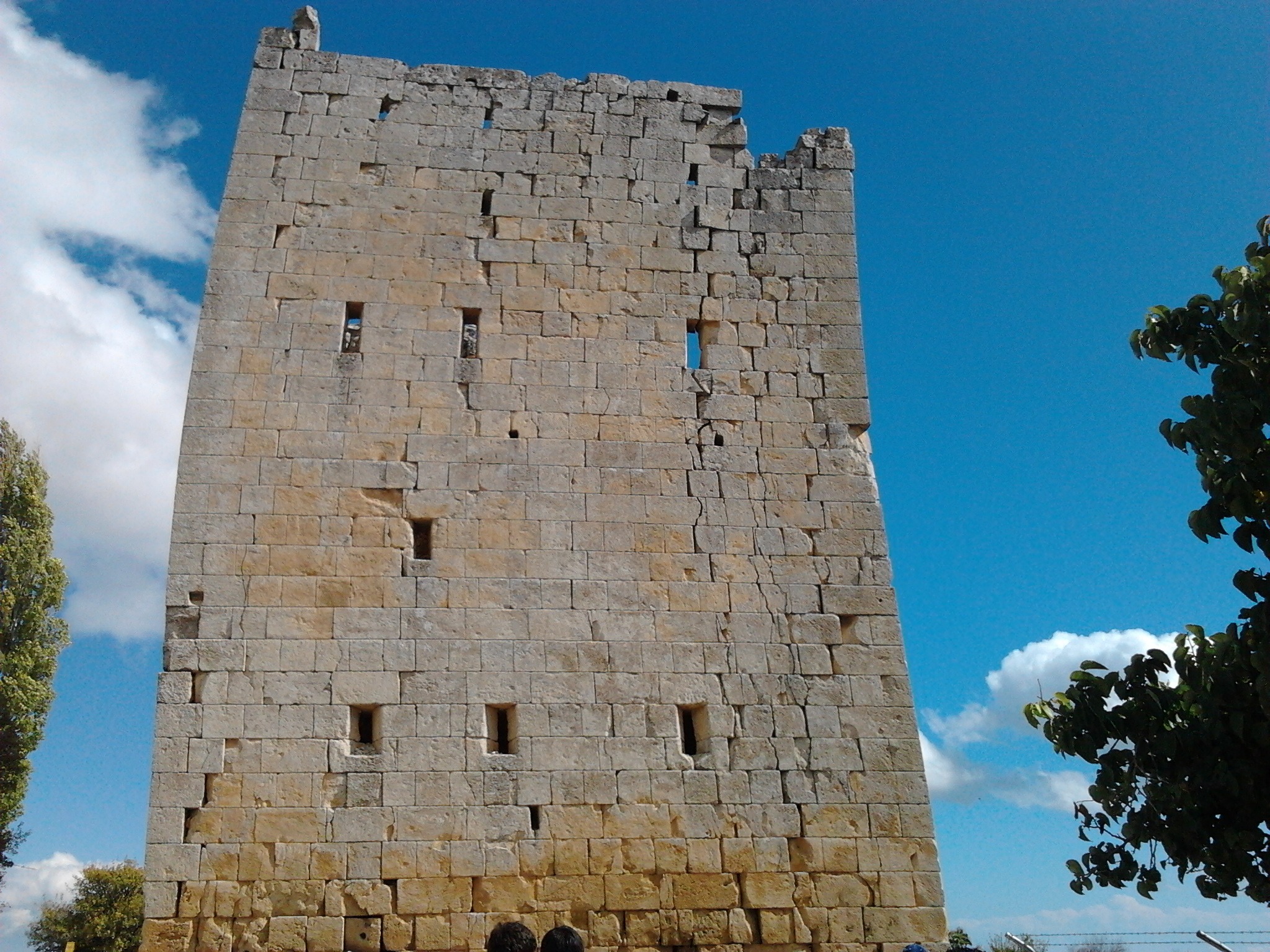
Hellenistic tower

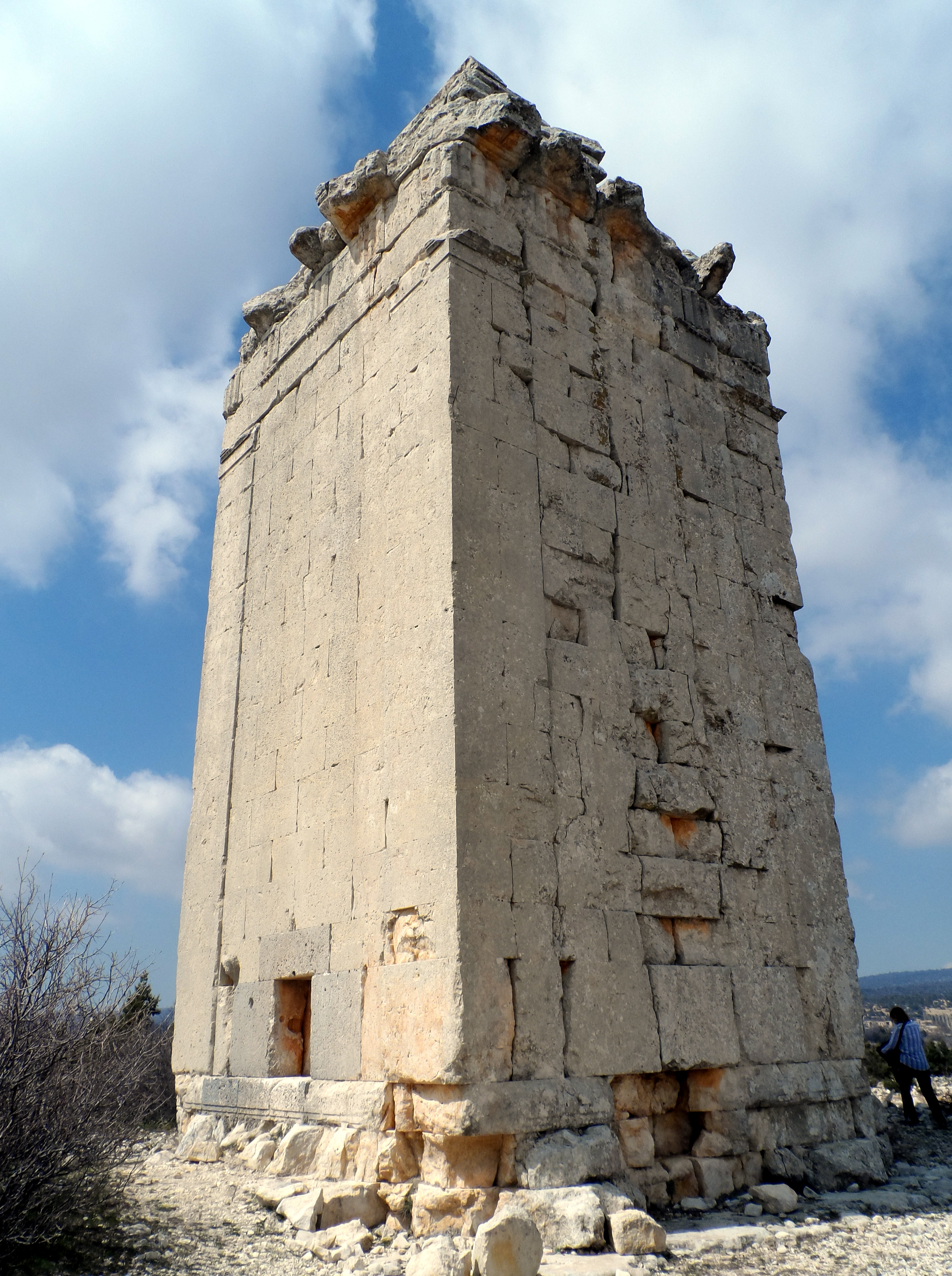
Mausoleum
