= Hüseyinler, Silifke =

Hüseyinler
- Neighbourhood
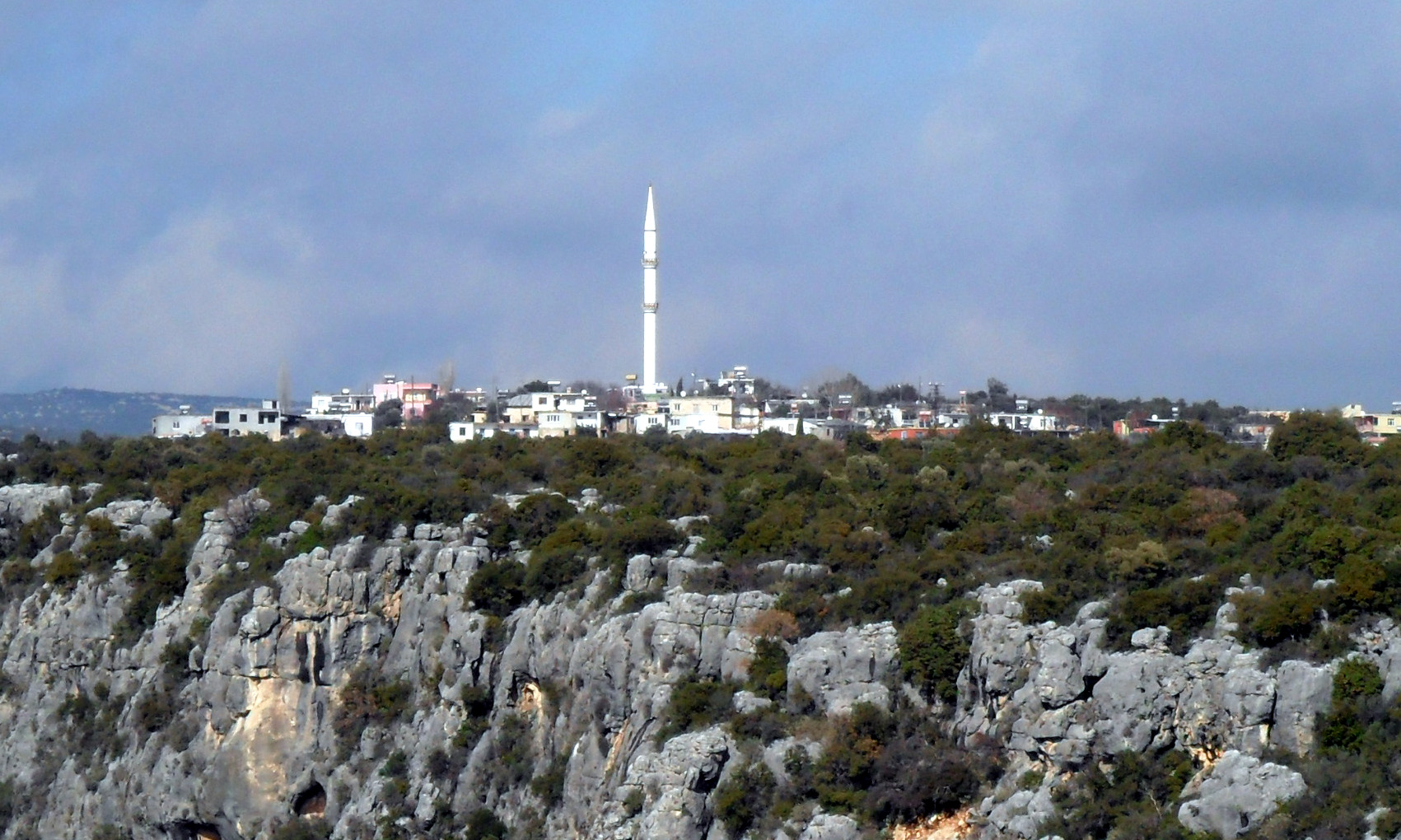
- Across the canyon

- Location within Turkey
- Coordinates: 36°32′N 34°03′E
- Country: Turkey
- Province: Mersin
- District: Silifke
- Elevation: 670 m (2,200 ft)
- Population (2022): 565
- Time zone: UTC+3 (TRT)
- Postal code: 33940
- Area code: 0324

Hüseyinler is a neighbourhood in the municipality and district of Silifke, Mersin Province, Turkey. Its population is 565 (2022). The village is situated in the peneplane area of Toros Mountains. The distance to Silifke is 30 kilometres (19 mi) and to Mersin is 65 kilometres (40 mi). Hüseyinler is north of Kızkalesi (Corycus of the antiquity) and Adamkayalar ( a location known for Roman rock reliefs.) The road between Hüseyinler and Kızkalesi is only 5 kilometres (3.1 mi) and the path (not passable by motor vehicles) to Adamkayalar is 2 kilometres (1.2 mi). Main activity of the village is agriculture. The crops include tomato and beans. Export of bay leaf also contribute to village economy.
