= Kabaçam =

Roman archaeological ruin in Turkey

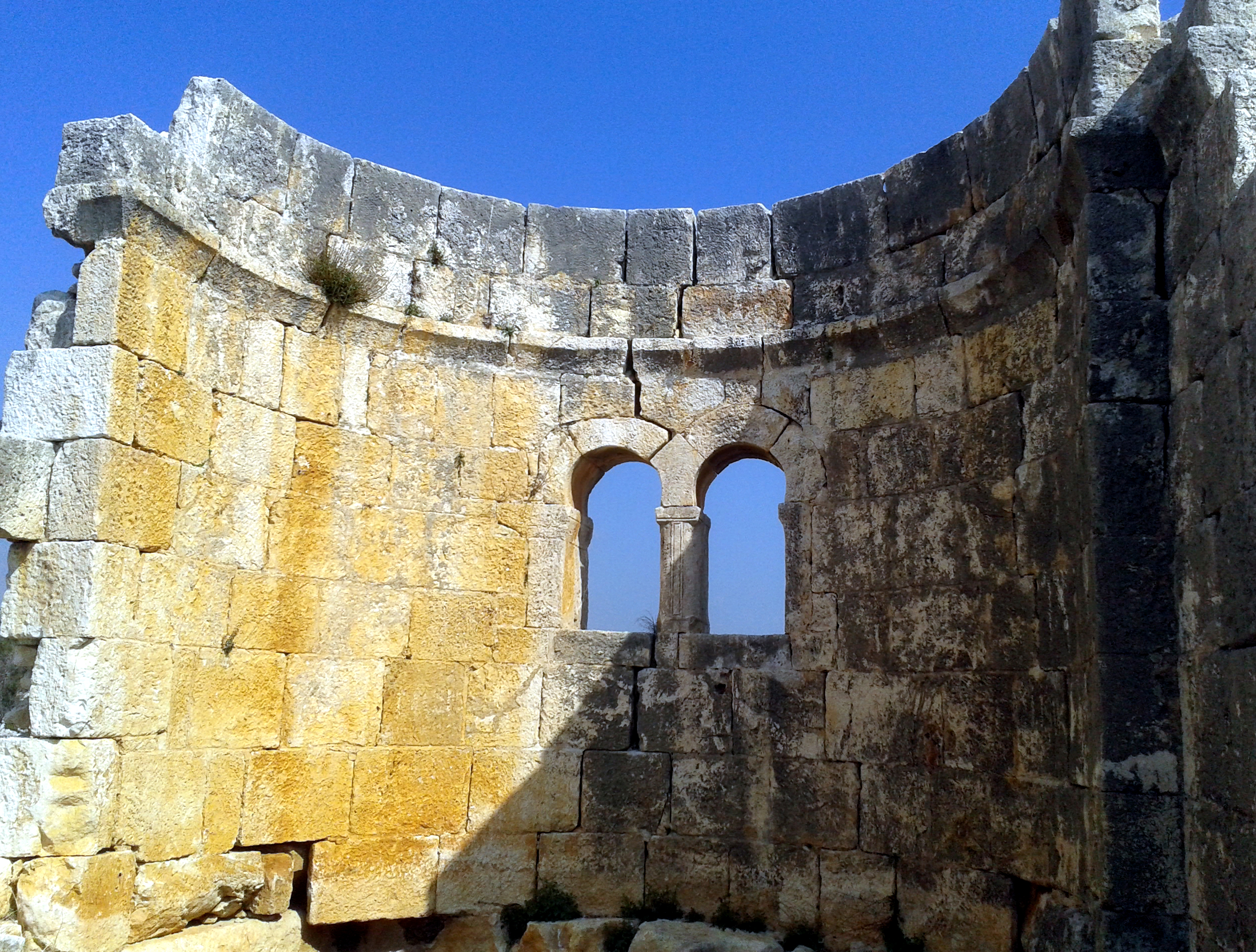
Kabaçam Church

Kabaçam, a.k.a. Kabaşam, is an archaeological site of a historic settlement in Mersin Province, southern Turkey.

== Geography ==
The site is in the rural area of Erdemli district of Mersin Province at 36°30′52″N 34°09′12″E. Hisarin Castle, another historical ruin to the south can be viewed from the site. Its distance to Erdemli is 19 km (12 mi) and to Mersin is 56 km (35 mi). Visitors to Kabaçam from Mersin follow the Turkish state highway D.400 up to Yemişkumu beach and then follow the village road to north for about 3 km (1.9 mi). The road runs within the settlement while most of the ruins are situated just at the west of the road.

== The site ==
The original name and the history of the settlement is not known. However, it is dated to late Roman or early Byzantine era.

Among the ruins, there are a basilica-plan church, houses, olive production workshops and a tower. There are reliefs of grapes and a relief of Hercules. In the necropolis, there are Ottoman tombs in addition to khamasorion-type sarcophagi. Originally, there was also a Roman road to the south, which is now almost lost in the dense scrub.
