= Aba, ruler of Olba =

Ancient ruler of Olba

Aba
- Tyrant ruler of Olba
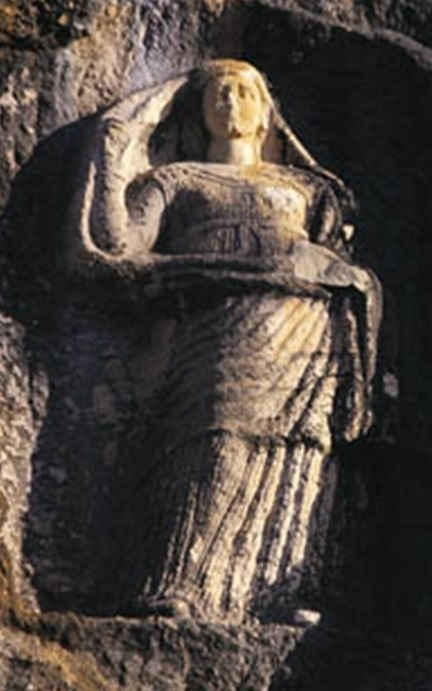
- Reign: 1st century BC
- Predecessor: Zenophanes

Aba (flourished 1st century BC) was a female Tyrant ruler of the state of Olba in Ancient Anatolia.

== Life ==
She was the daughter of the tyrant (absolute ruler) Zenophanes (or Xenophanes) of the Olba kingdom in Cilicia (present-day Turkey). Her father trained her in politics and she was appointed to the post of priestess prior to her rule.

She succeeded her father as tyrant-ruler of Olba where a temple was located of Jupiter, founded by Ajax, son of Teucer. At the time when she ascended to the throne, it was uncommon for a woman to rule as tyrant. The exact years of her reign is not known. She reportedly succeeded her father sometime during the years between 43 BC to 39 BC, but it is not known how long she ruled. It is known that she ruled during the Final War of the Roman Republic (32–30 BC), since she is known for her policy during that war.

Aba was known for her diplomatic contacts, such that Egyptian ruler Cleopatra VII of Egypt and Roman Mark Antony conferred Olba upon Aba as a favor. She was their ally during the Final War of the Roman Republic (32–30 BC).

She was ultimately deposed, but her descendants ruled over Olba until its definitive incorporation into the Roman Empire.

== Literature ==
- Johannes Toepffer: Aba 4. In: Pauly's Realencyclopedia of classical antiquity (RE). Volume I,1, Stuttgart 1893, column 4.
- Walther Ruge: Olbe. In: Pauly's Realencyclopedia of classical antiquity (RE). Volume XVII,2, Stuttgart 1937, col. 2399-2403.
- Roller, Duane W. (2018). Cleopatra's Daughter: And Other Royal Women of the Augustan Era. Oxford University Press. pp. 121–123. ISBN 978-0-19-061882-7.
