= Hisarın Castle =

Castle ruin in Turkey

- Part of Olba
- Mersin Province, Turkey
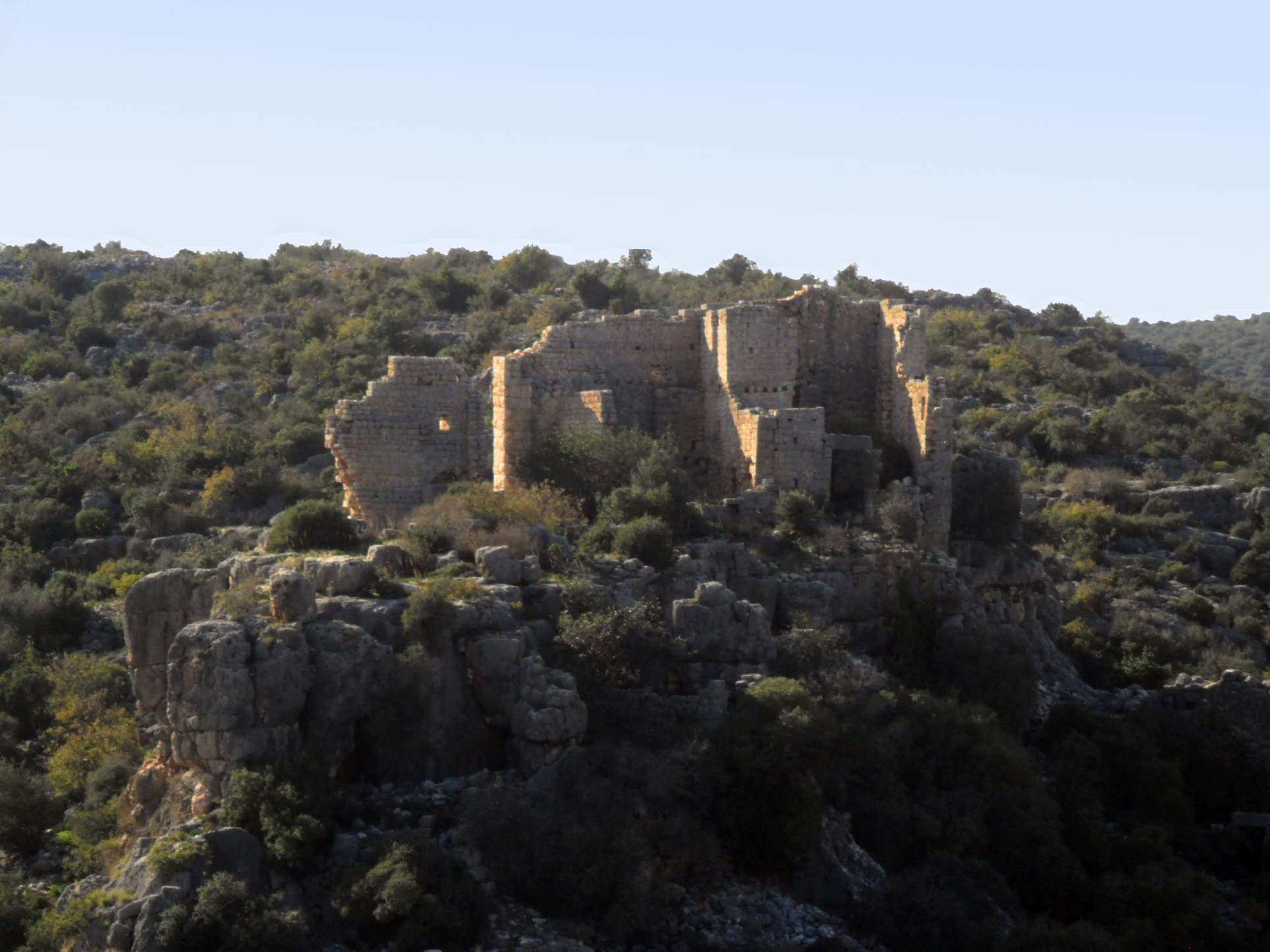
- From the east

Site information
- Type: Fortress
- Open to the public: Yes

Location
- Coordinates: 36°30′26″N 34°09′26″E

Site history
- Built by: Seleucid Empire (?)
- Materials: Stone
- Demolished: Most of it

Hisarin Castle (Turkish: Hisarinkale also known as Hisarkale where Hisar means "fort") is a castle ruin in Mersin Province, Turkey.

== Geography ==
The castle is in the rural area of Erdemli district, to the west of an irregular stream. Although its birds flight distance to the highway D.400 which connects Mersin to Antalya is about 3 kilometres (1.9 mi) there is no direct road to the castle and the castle can be reached by foot through bushy terrain from the village road between Ayaş and Esenpınar. Its distance to Erdemli is 20 kilometres (12 mi) and to Mersin is 56 kilometres (35 mi).

== History ==
The history of the castle has not been firmly established. But the polygonal masonry suggests ancient age. (Seleucid Empire or Roman Empire era). The castle was used as a garrison to protect the ancient city to the east of the valley.

== The building ==
The double layer rampart was built by polygonal masonry. The inner side of rampart was supported by backing-walls. There are some compartments to the north which are thought to be workshops of the castle and there are three mausoleums to the north east. There are a number of graves and some rooms to the south of the castle. One important element of the castle is a Heracles figuration on the wall which was a symbol of Olba Kingdom, a vassal of the Seleucid Empire.
