= Taşgeçit Bridge =

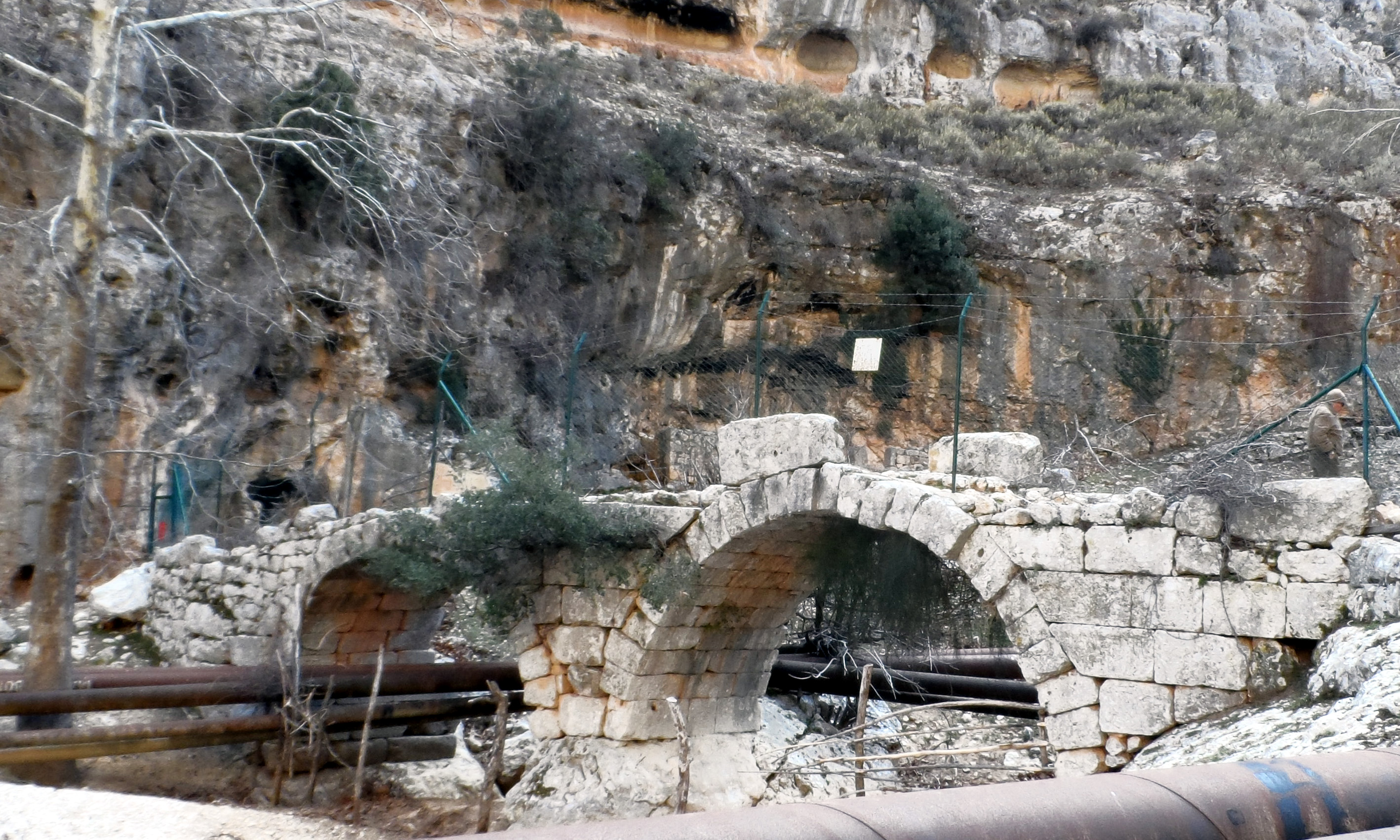
- From north east
- Coordinates: 36°36′45″N 34°06′13″E
- Crosses: dry river bed

Characteristics
- Material: Stone arches
- Width: ca 1 metre (3 ft 3 in)
- No. of spans: 2

History
- Construction start: 2nd century

Location
- Interactive map of Taşgeçit Bridge

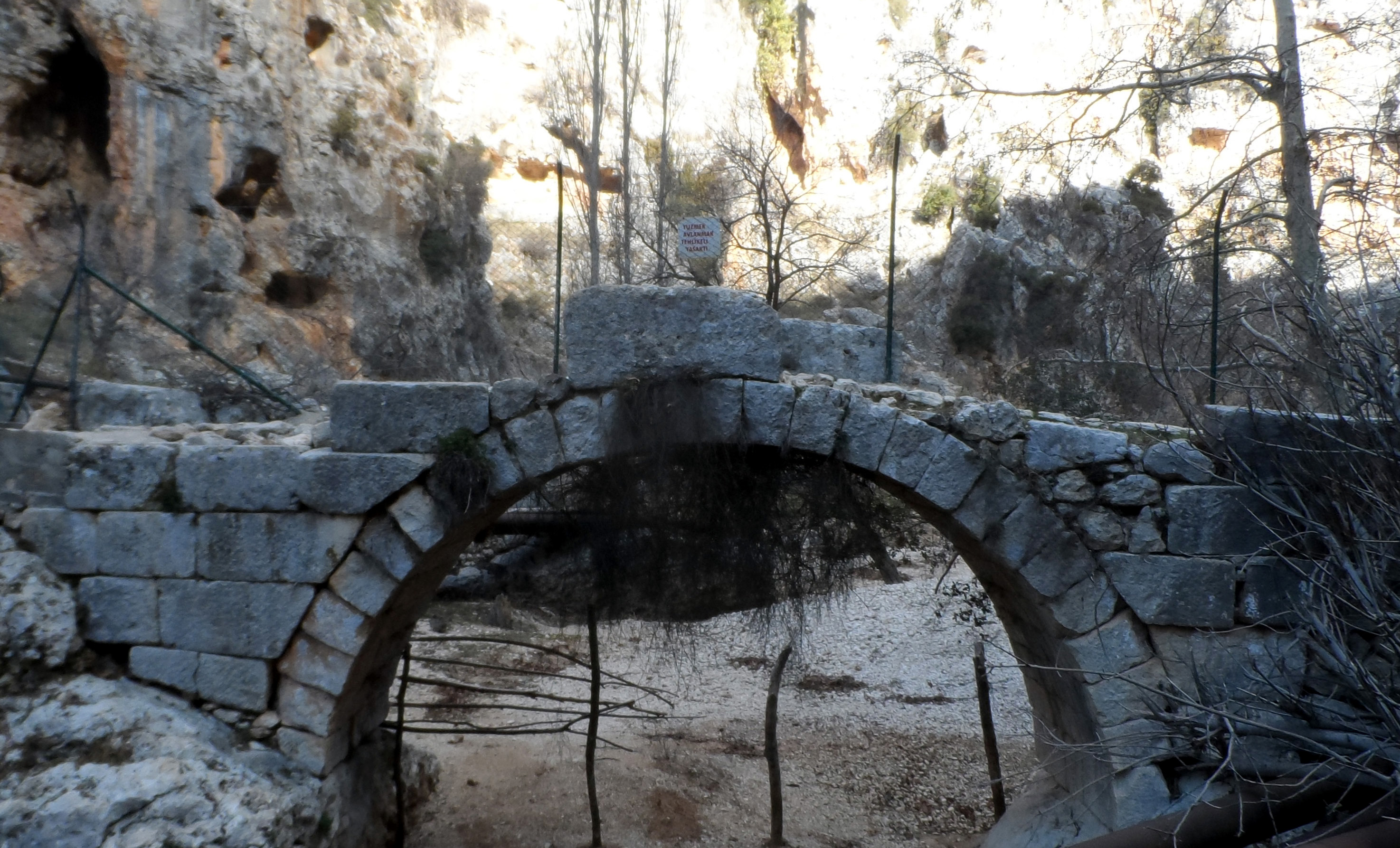
Main arch of Taşgeçit Roman Bridge Mersin Province, Turkey from south west

Taşgeçit Bridge (Turkish: Taşgeçit Köprüsü, literally Stone gate bridge) is a Roman bridge in Mersin Province, Turkey.

The bridge is about 3.5 kilometres (2.2 mi) south west of Yeniyurt village of Erdemli ilçe (district) at 36°36′45″N 34°06′13″E. Its distance to Erdemli is 29 kilometres (18 mi) and to Mersin is 65 kilometres (40 mi). It was over a now dried up creek, a tributary of Lamas River.

There are a few written sources on the bridge. According to Professor Serra Durugönül of Mersin University Archaeology department, the bridge was constructed in the 2nd century during the Roman rule in Anatolia. It is a stone bridge with two arches. Even today the bridge is quite usable. However the creek has dried up and the ancient road has already been wiped off. Thus the bridge is out of usage. Presently there are water pipes from a nearby water regulator to villages passing under the arches.
