= Yanıkhan =

Archaeological site in Turkey

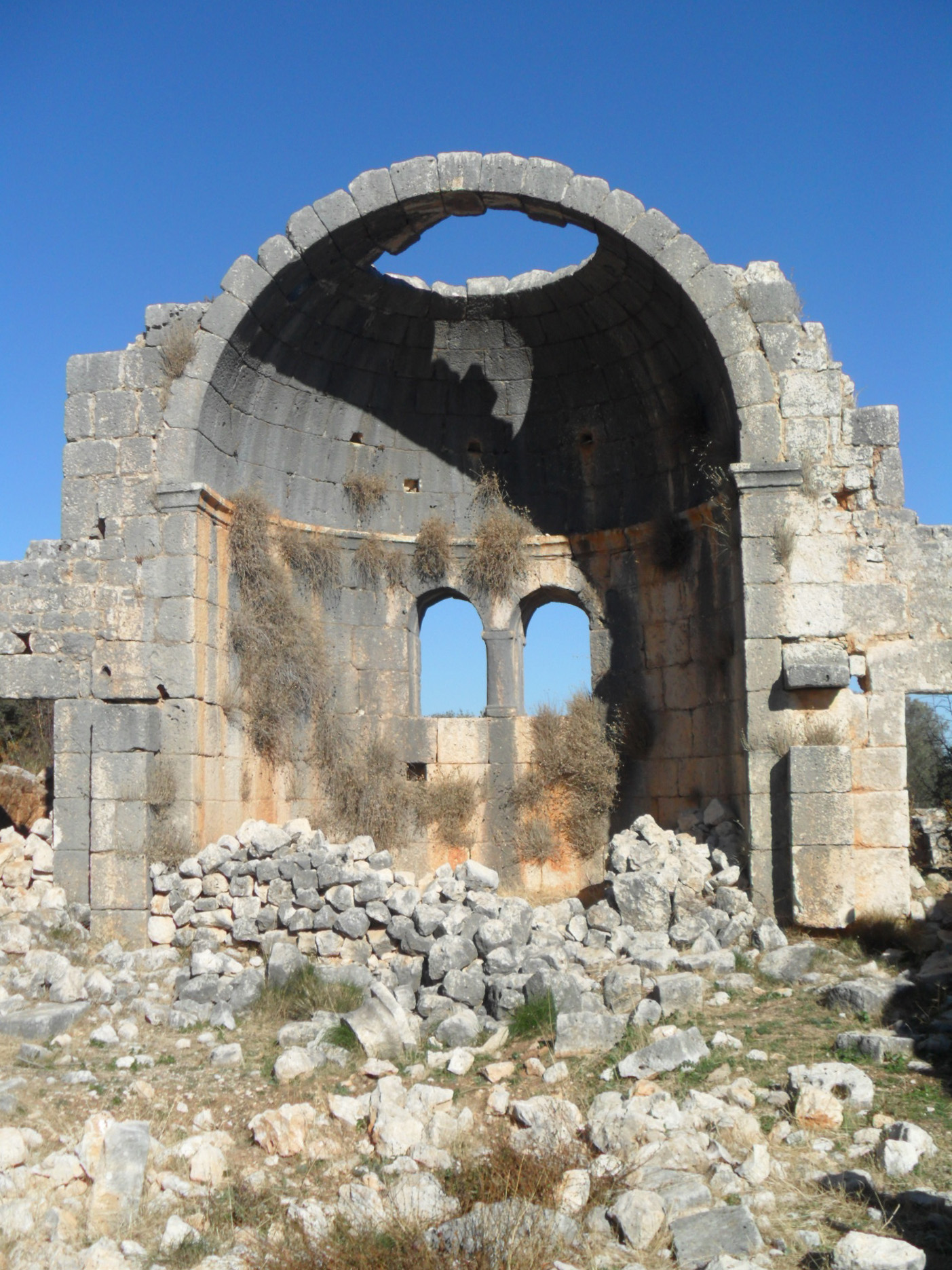
- Basilica in Yanıkhan

- Location within Turkey
- 36°35′N 34°12′E
- Type: Settlement
- Periods: Byzantine Empire
- Location: Erdemli, Mersin Province, Turkey
- Region: Mediterranean Region

Yanıkhan is an archaeological site in Mersin Province, Turkey. It is about 5 kilometres (3.1 mi) northwest of Limonlu town. It is to the east of Limonlu-Esenpınar road and west of Limonlu River at about 36°35′N 34°12′E. Its distance to Erdemli is 18 kilometres (11 mi) and to Mersin is 54 kilometres (34 mi).

== History ==
The original name of the site is not known. But according to archaeological evidence it is a 5th and 6th century Byzantine site. First reference to its existence was by Professor Michael Gough in 1959.

== Archaeology ==
Yanıkhan was a village. There are more than 30 house ruins. The most important building is a basilica. Although the houses are completely demolished a part of the basilica survives. In addition to main abscissa there are two minor abscissas. There are two sarcophagi. One may be an arcosolium which may belong to a certain Georgios Konon Chrisyophoros who, according to an inscription, was the commissioner of the basilica. There is also a cistern to the west of the basilica. 100 metres (330 ft) to the east of the basilica there is another church (called Church B by the archaeologists).
