= Uzuncaburç =

- Neighbourhood
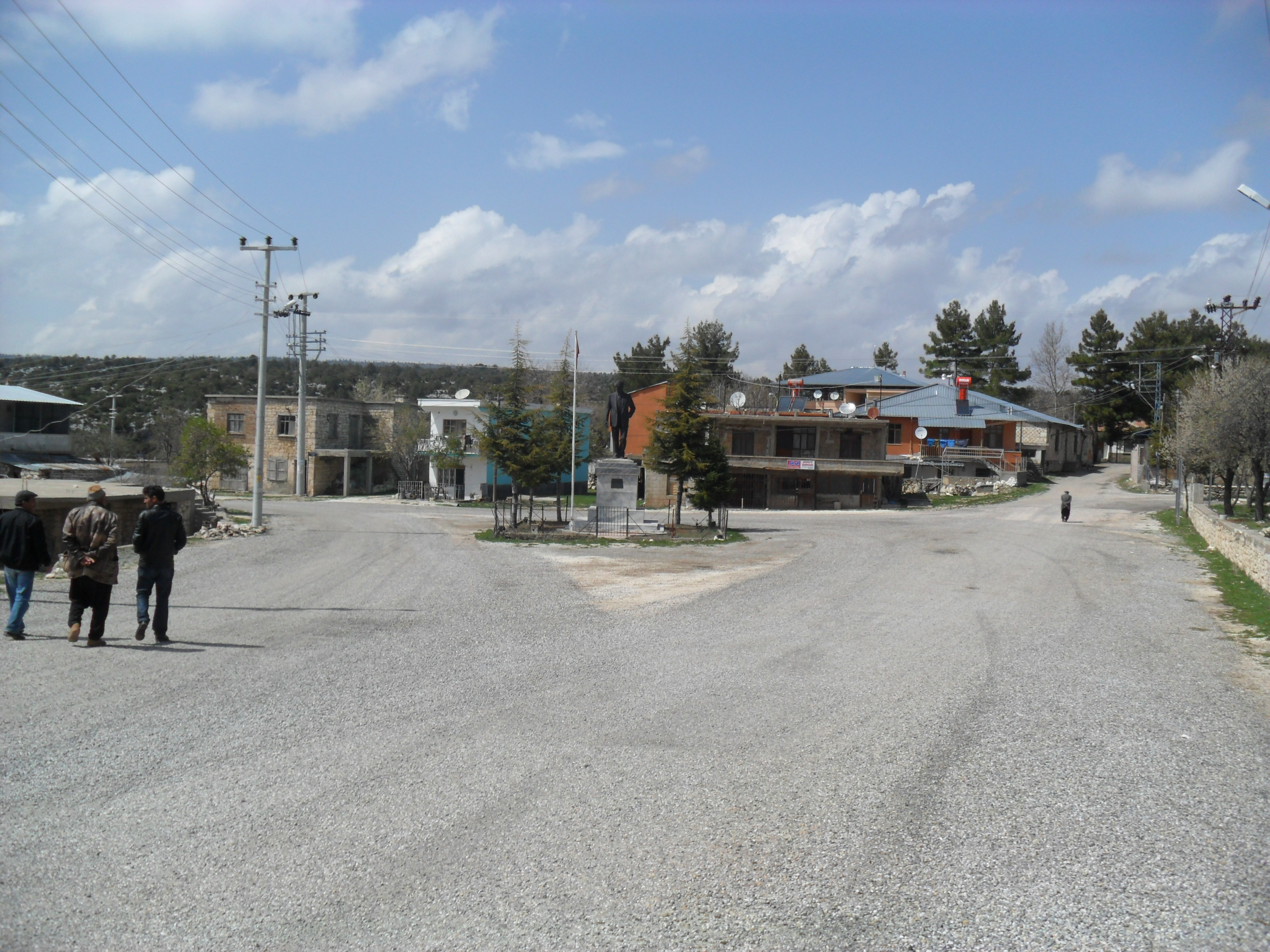

- Location within Turkey
- Coordinates: 36°35′N 33°56′E
- Country: Turkey
- Province: Mersin
- District: Silifke
- Elevation: 1,200 m (3,900 ft)
- Population (2022): 878
- Time zone: UTC+3 (TRT)
- Postal code: 33940
- Area code: 0324

Uzuncaburç is a neighbourhood in the municipality and district of Silifke, Mersin Province, Turkey. Its population is 878 (2022). Before the 2013 reorganisation, it was a town (belde).

== Geography ==
Uzuncaburç is in the rural area of the Silifke district. It is located in the valleys of Toros Mountains at the north of Silifke with an altitude of 1,200 m (3,900 ft). The highway distance to Silifke is 30 km (19 mi) and to Mersin is 111 km (69 mi).

== History ==
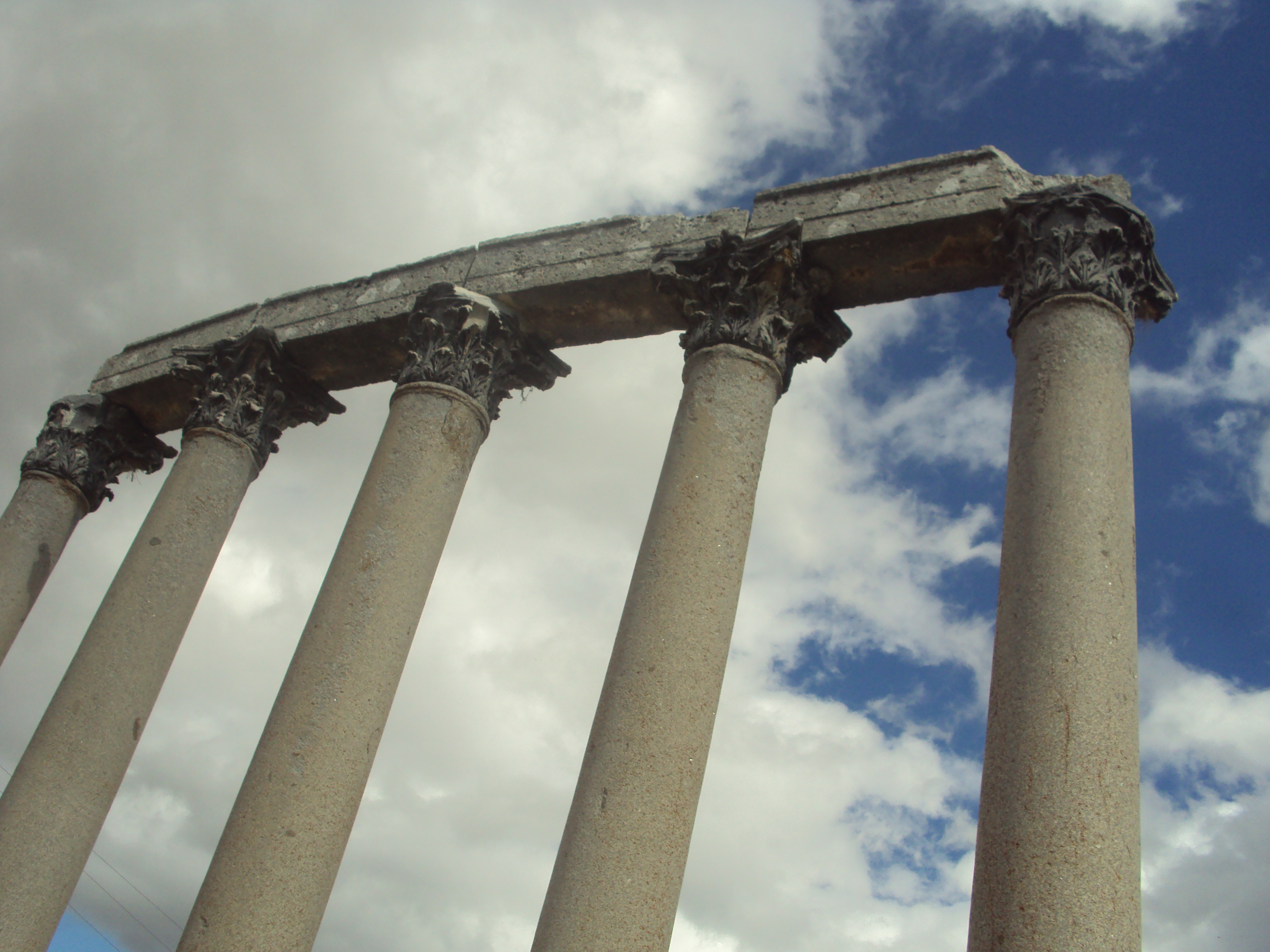
Temple of Tyche, Olba.

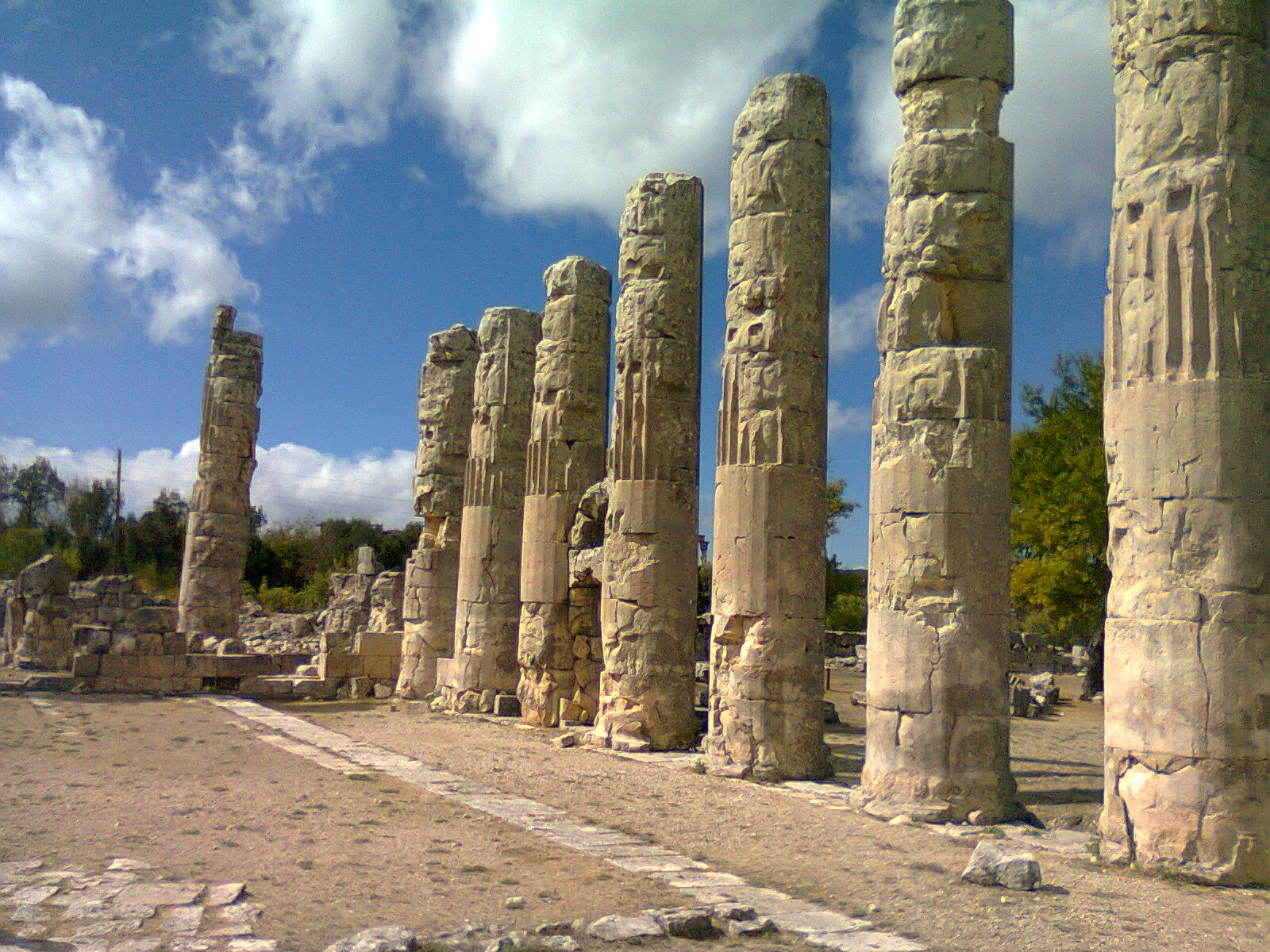
Temple of Zeus, Olba.

Uzuncaburç is situated next to ruins of the ancient city Olba and the name of the town Uzuncaburç (after 1973) means Tall bastion referring to the ruins. Uzuncaburç was declared township in 1992.

== Economy ==
Main crops are cereals and chickpea. There are also some vineyards. The secondary economic activity is sheep and goat breeding. Although touristic potential is great, at the present tourism plays no important role in the economy of the town.
