= Adamkayalar =

Rock carved figures in Mersin Province, Turkey

Adamkayalar (literally "man-rocks") is a location in Mersin Province, Turkey famous for its eponymous ancient rock-carved figures.

== Geography ==
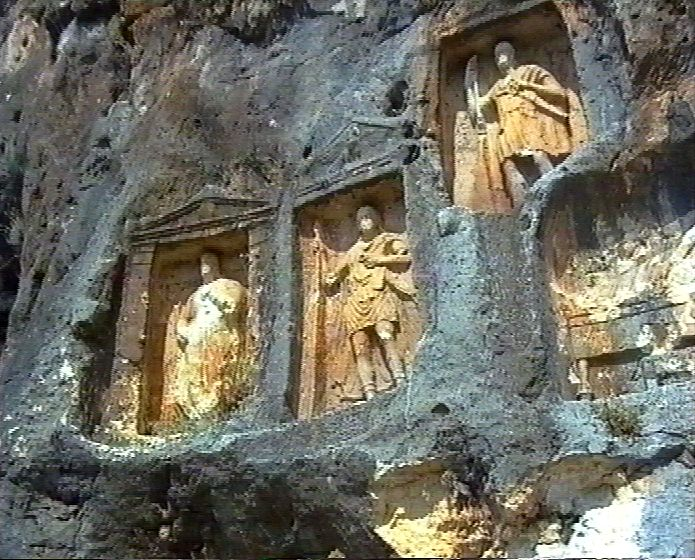

Adamkayalar is on the southern slopes of the Toros Mountains only several kilometers north of the Kızkalesi and Mediterranean coastline at about 36°31′30″N 34°03′15″E. Distance to Kızkalesi, the coastline town is 7 kilometres (4.3 mi), to Silifke is 32 kilometres (20 mi) and to Mersin is 66 kilometres (41 mi). Kızkalesi is on the Datça-Mersin highway. To reach Adamkayalar the travellers have to follow an asphalt village road of 5 kilometres (3.1 mi). But the last 2 kilometres (1.2 mi) of the path which detaches from the village road, leads to a gorge named Şeytanderesi. The rest of the road is impassable by the motor vehicles and in order to reach the rocks the explorers should climb down.

== Figures ==
On the rocks facing the gorge, there are carved figures in nine niches. These are the figures of eleven males, four females and two children and one ibex. (The name Adamkayalar means Men-rocks) On pediment, there are also the figures of Roman eagles (Aquila). No document exists about the origin of the figures, but they are probably from the second century AD.

In 2019, a large amount of damage was inflicted on the reliefs; reports said it had been done by treasure hunters who believed gold was inside the statues.
