= Olba (ancient city) =

Ancient city in Turkey

- Ὄλβη (Ancient Greek)
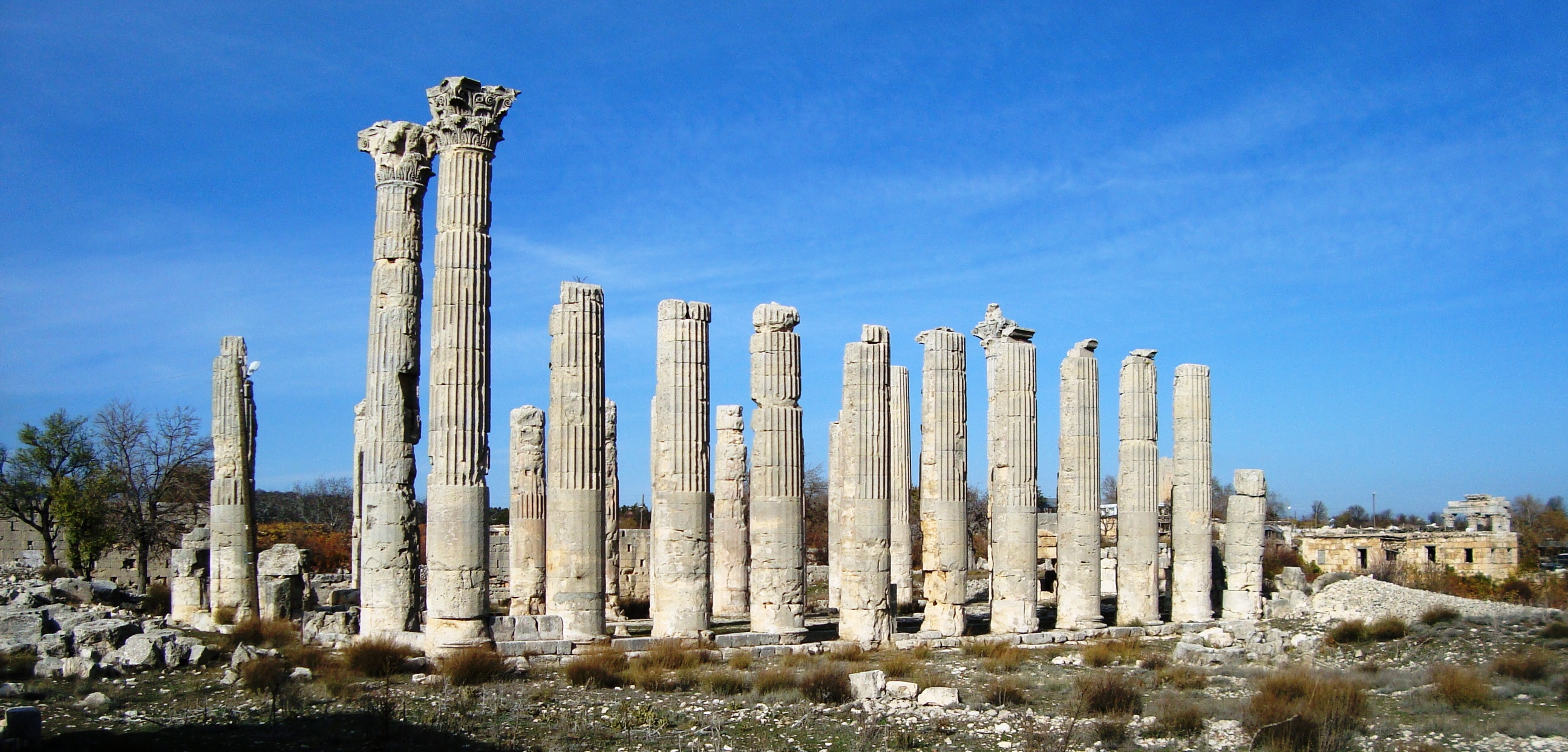
- Temple of Zeus at Olba

- Location within Turkey
- 36°35′N 33°56′E
- Type: Settlement
- Location: Mersin Province, Turkey
- Region: Cilicia

Site notes
- Condition: In ruins

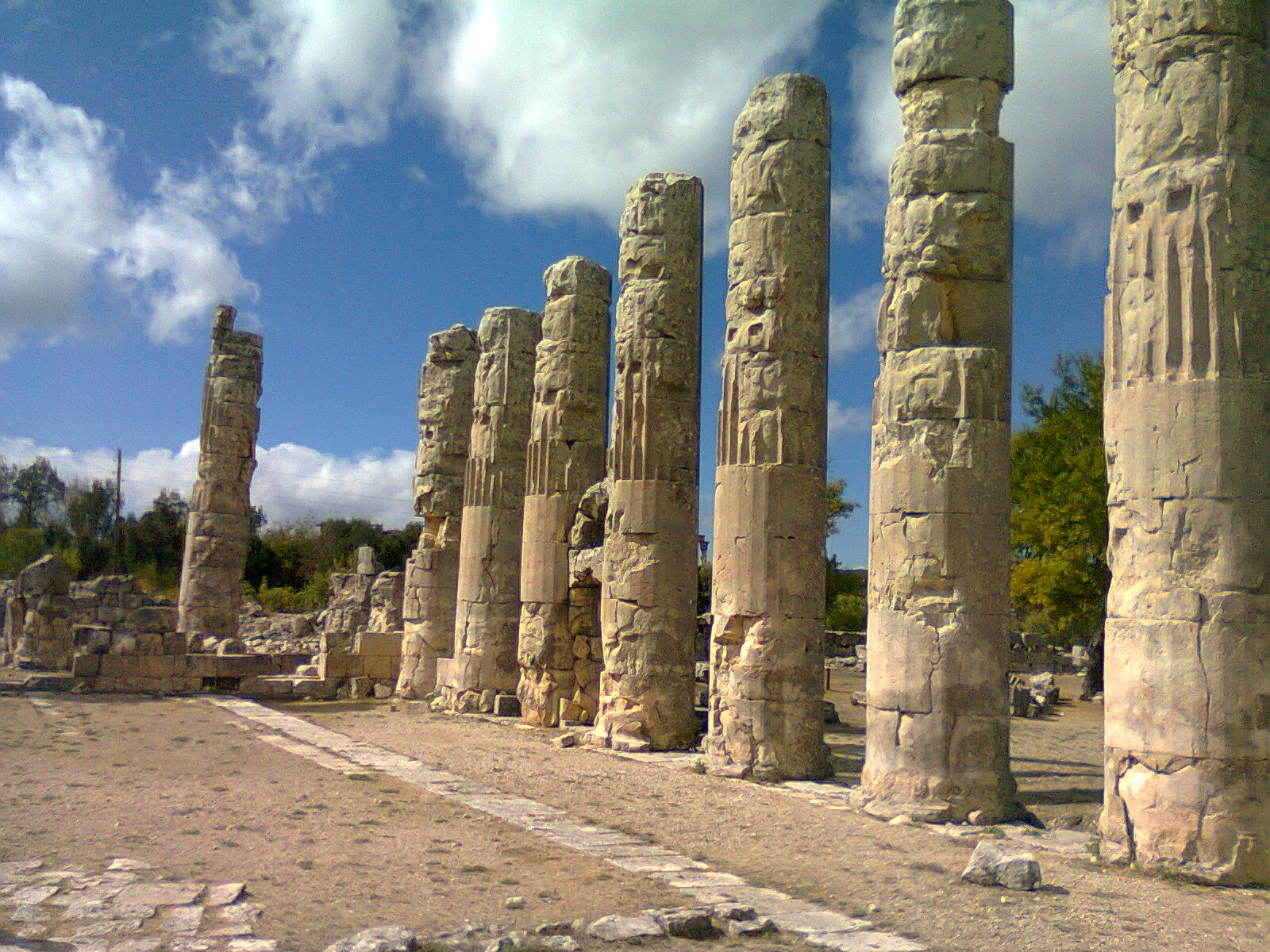
Temple of Zeus

Olba or Olbe (Ancient Greek: Ὄλβη; Turkish: Oura) was an ancient city and bishopric in the Roman province of Isauria, in present-day southern Turkey. It is included in the Catholic Church's list of Latin titular sees.

== Discovery ==
The site of Olba, within the broader Olbian region, was identified by archaeologist Theodore Bent and his wife in March 1890, during their survey of part of Cilicia Tracheia.

== History ==
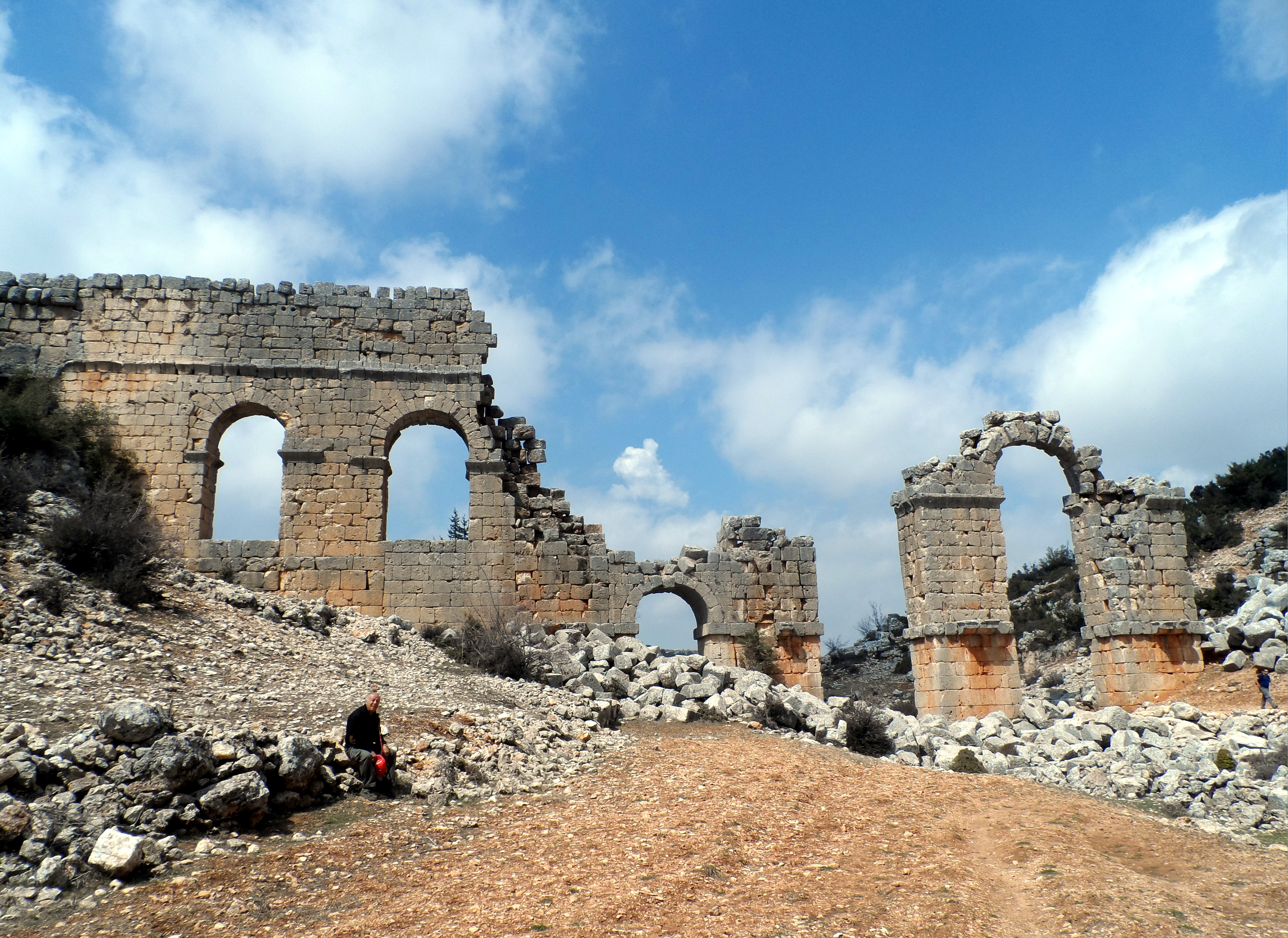
Olba Aqueduct

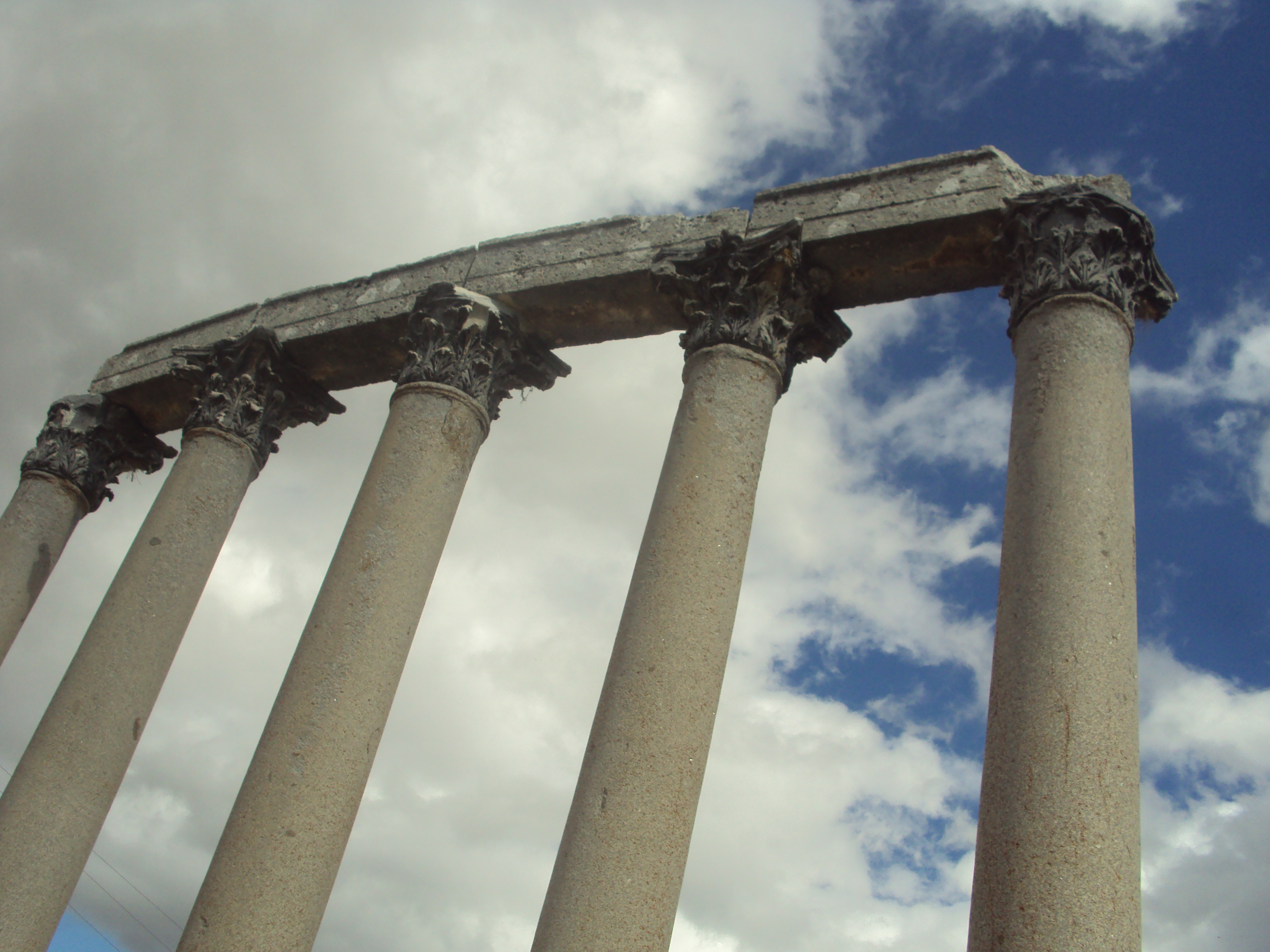
Temple of Tyche, Olba.

Olba was a city of Cetis in Cilicia Aspera, later forming part of Isauria. It was situated at the foot of the Taurus Mountains, on a tributary of the Calycadnus.

According to Greek mythology, Olbe had been built by Ajax, half-brother of Teucer; it contained a temple of Zeus, whose priest once ruled over all Cilicia Aspera. Strabo described it:

"Above this [ Kyinda ] and Soloi [in Kilikia] is a mountainous country, in which is a city Olbe, with a temple of Zeus, founded by Aias the son of Teukros. The priest of this temple became dynast of Kilikia Trakheia; and then the country was beset by numerous tyrants, and the gangs of pirates were organized. And after the overthrow of these they called this country the domain of Teukros, and called the same also the priesthood of Teukros; and most of the priests were named Teukros or Aias."

The temple would have been closed when Christianity was introduced during the persecution of pagans in the late Roman Empire.

During the 1st century BC, it was ruled by the local tyrants Zenophanes and his daughter Aba. Later, it became a Roman colony. Strabo calls it Olbe (Ὄλβη). Ptolemy calls it Olbasa (Ὄλβασα). Stephanus of Byzantium calls it Olbia (Ὀλβία).

A coin of Diocæsarea, Olbos; Hierocles (Synecdemus, 709), Olbe; Basil of Seleucia (Mirac. S.Theclæ, 2, 8) and the Greek Notitiæ episcopatuum, Olba. The primitive name must have been Ourba or Orba, found in Theophanes the Chronographer, hence Ourbanopolis in "Acta S. Bartholomei".

In Christian times, it was regarded as belonging to Isauria, and was the seat of a bishop.

Its ruins, north of Silifke in the Turkish province of Mersin, are called Oura in Turkish.

== Ecclesiastical history ==
Olba was a suffragan of the Metropolitan of Isauria's provincial capital Seleucia, but faded like most sees in Asia Minor. Olba maintained a sizable Christian population in the 4th and 5th centuries, when the Temple of Zeus was converted into a church.

Michel Le Quien (Oriens christianus, II, 1031) gives four bishops between the fourth and seventh centuries; but the Notitiæ episcopatuum mentions the see until the thirteenth century.

=== Titular see ===
The diocese was nominally restored as titular bishopric of the episcopal (lowest) rank under the name Olba (Latin and Curiate Italian); Latin adjective Olbiensis.

In 1927 it was suppressed, having had the following incumbents, all of the fitting Episcopal (lowest) rank:

- Louis-François-Alexandre de Jarente de Senas d’Orgeval (1780.12.11 – 1788.05.28), Coadjutor Bishop of Orleans (France) (1780.12.11 – 1788.05.28), succeeding as Bishop of Orléans (1788.05.28 – retired 1801.10.29); died 1805
- Antonio Luis Gaona, Military Order of Saint James the Sword (O.S.) (1800.08.11 – death 1804) (born Spain; no prelature)
- Vasco José a Domina Nostra de Bona Morte Lobo, Canons Regular of Saint Augustine (C.R.S.A.) (1805.06.26 – death 1822.06.01), as Bishop-Prelate of Mozambique (Mozambique) (1805.06.26 – retired 1811.12.17) and on emeritate
- Francis Patrick Moran (1871.12.22 – 1872.08.11) as Coadjutor Bishop of Ossory (Ireland) (1871.12.22 – 1872.08.11), succeeded as Bishop of Ossory (1872.08.11 – 1884.03.14), later Metropolitan Archbishop of Sydney (Australia) (1884.03.14 – death 1911.08.16), created Cardinal-Priest of S. Susanna (1885.07.30 – death 1911.08.16)
- Stephanus Junák (1875.11.23 – death 1879.09.03) as Auxiliary Bishop of Oradea Mare (Romania) (1875.11.23 – 1879.09.03)
- Bernard Hermann Koeckemann, Picpus Fathers (SS.CC.) (1881.05.17 – 1892.02.22) as Coadjutor Apostolic Vicar Hawaiian Islands (Polynesia, USA; now Diocese of Honolulu) (1881.05.17 – 1882.06.11), succeeding as Vicar Apostolic of Hawaiian Islands (USA) (1882.06.11 – death 1892.02.22)
- Charles-François Lasne, Lazarists (C.M.) (1911.02.15 – death 1927.06.23) as Coadjutor Vicar Apostolic of Fort-Dauphin (Madagascar) (1911.02.15 – 1927.06.23)

In 1933 it was again restored as titular bishopric of Olba. It is vacant since decades, having had the following incumbents, so far of the fitting episcopal rank :

- Louis-Justin Gumy, Capuchin Friars Minor (O.F.M. Cap.) (1934.01.09 – 1941.04.27) as emeritate, previously Bishop of Port Victoria (Seychelles) (1921.03.10 – 1934.01.09)
- Tihamér Tóth (1938.05.30 – 1939.03.03) as Coadjutor Bishop of Veszprém (Hungary) (1938.05.30 – 1939.03.03), succeeded as Bishop of Veszprém (1939.03.03 – death 1939.05.06)
- Augustine Danglmayr (1942.04.24 – death 1992.09.18) as Auxiliary Bishop of Diocese of Dallas (Texas, USA) (1942.04.24 – retired 1969.08.22) and on emeritate

== See also ==
- Uzuncaburç

== Bibliography ==
- Durugönül, Serra (1998). Türme und Siedlungen im rauhen Kilikien. Eine Untersuchung zu den archäologischen Hinterlassenschaften im Olbischen Territorium [Towers and Settlements in Rough Cilicia. A Study of the Archaeological Remains in the Olbian Territory]. Asia Minor Studien, vol. 28. Bonn: Habelt, ISBN 3774928401.

== Sources and external links ==
- Livius.org: Olba (Diocaesarea)
- GCatholic - (titular) bishopric
