= Öküzlü =

Archaeological site in Mersin Province, Turkey

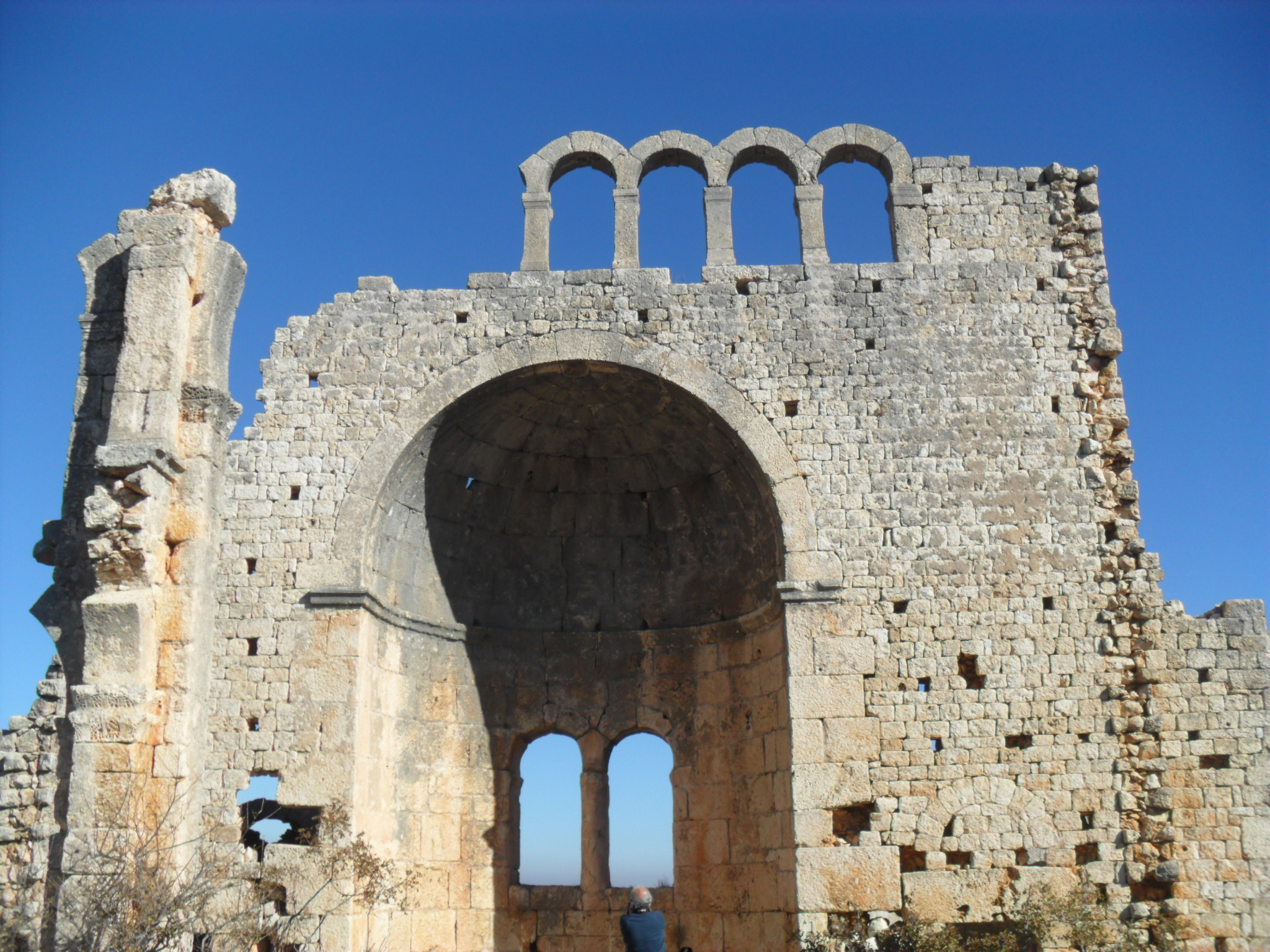
- Basilica at Öküzlü

- Location within Turkey
- 36°34′0″N 34°09′40″E
- Type: Settlement
- Location: Erdemli, Mersin Province, Turkey
- Region: Cilicia Trachea

Site notes
- Condition: In ruins

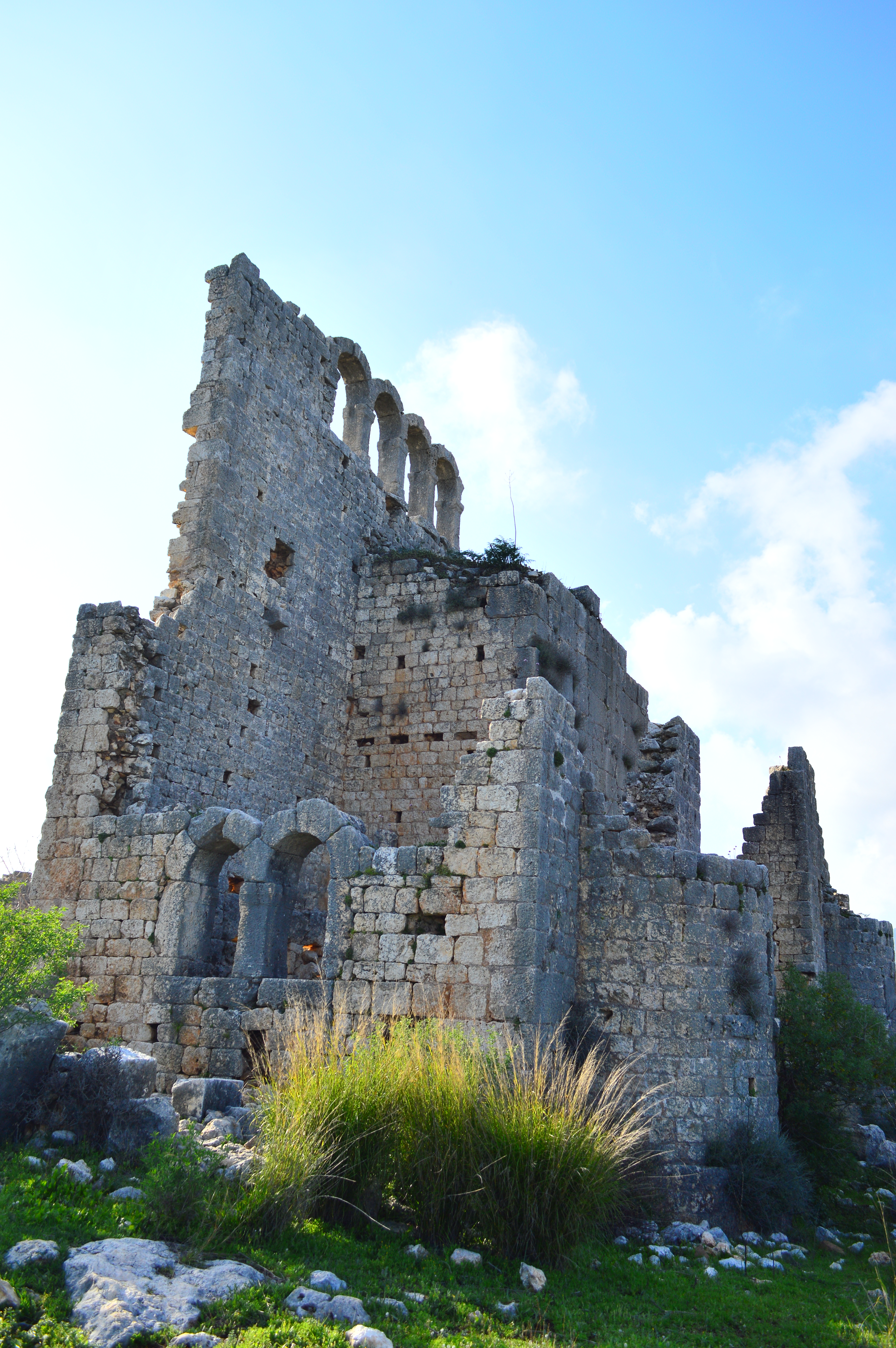
Backside of the basilica

Öküzlü is an archaeological site in Mersin Province, Turkey.

== Geography ==
Öküzlü (Öküzlüklü) is situated in the rural area of Erdemli district which is rich in archaeological ruins. It is close to Batısandal village. There are many ruins around Öküzlü. Kanlıdivane and Elaiussa Sebaste are to the south, Emirzeli is to the west, Tapureli ruins are to the north of Öküzlü. Highway distance to the coastal town of Ayaş on Turkish state highway D.400 is 12 kilometres (7.5 mi). Öküzlü is also accessible from Limonlu (Lamos of the antiquity). Its distance to Erdemli is 30 kilometres (19 mi) and to Mersin is 67 kilometres (42 mi).

== History ==
The original name of the site is not known. Turkish name Öküzlü (literally "with ox") refers to reliefs of oxen on column heads (now in Mersin Museum). Archaeological evidence from masonry imply that the site can be backdated to Hellenistic era. It was however reconstructed in the 5th or 6th centuries, i.e., early Byzantine era.

== The ruins ==
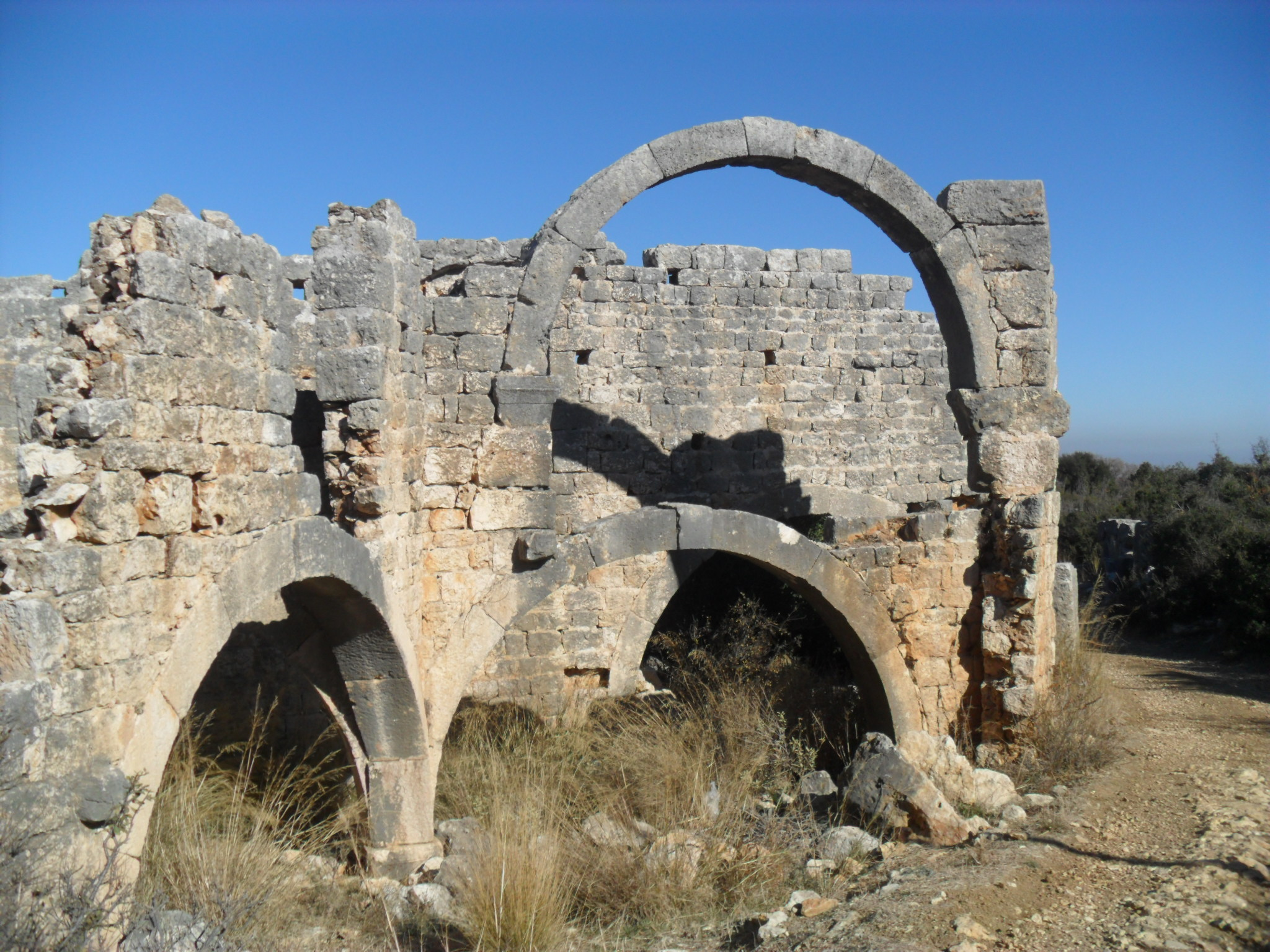
Öküzlü

The house ruins in the north of the site are examples of the polygonal and Byzantine masonry. One house is a peristyle house. The foundations of some buildings are carved rock. There are sarcophagi along the road. At the center of the site there are ruins of a basilica. The basilica with three naves and a transept is backdated to about 500. There is a smaller church situated about 500 metres (1,600 ft) south of the basilica.
