= Lamas Aqueduct =

Roman aqueduct in Turkey

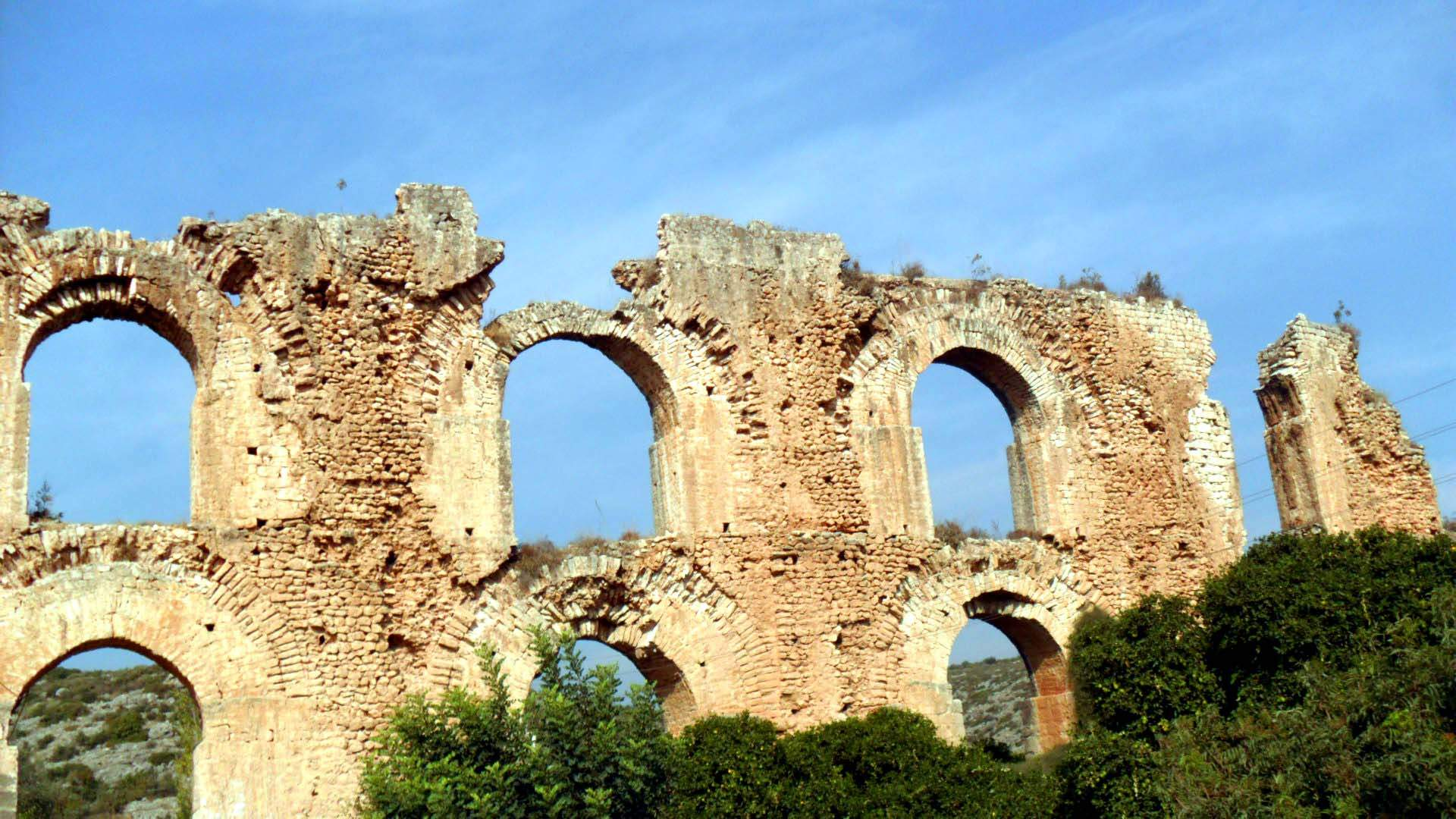
A part of the aqueduct near the town of Kumkuyu

Lamas Aqueduct is a Roman aqueduct in Mersin Province, Turkey

== Location ==
The source of the watercourse is Limonlu River also known as Lamas River at an altitude of approximately 100 metres (330 ft). It is directed to south west in parallel to Mediterranean coast. The average distance between the coast and the aqueduct is about 1 kilometre (0.62 mi). The original aqueduct ends by the ancient Elaiussa Sebaste (modern Ayaş), but a supplementary aqueduct reaches to Corycus (modern Kızkalesi).

The total length of the aqueduct is more than 15 kilometres (9.3 mi).

== History ==
The first section of the watercourse up to Elaiussa Sebaste was built by the Roman Empire in the 1st or 2nd centuries. After Elaiussa Sebaste's decline, the Byzantine Empire extended the watercourse to Corykos in the 5th or 6th centuries.

== Construction ==
Part of the watercourse is through open channels or galleries in the peneplane area south of Toros Mountains. The galleries have windows for maintenance. But most of the watercourse is actually a series of seven aqueducts over the fields and the roads . To ensure a stable flow in the aqueduct the aqueduct has a constant slope between Limonlu River and Corykus. The cross sectional area of the aqueduct is about 1.1 metres (3 ft 7 in) high by 1.7 metres (5 ft 7 in) wide.

== See also ==
- List of aqueducts in the Roman Empire
- List of Roman aqueducts by date
- Ancient Roman technology
- Roman engineering
