= Ayaş, Mersin =

Ayaş
- Neighbourhood
- Location in Turkey
- Coordinates: 36°29′N 34°11′E
- Country: Turkey
- Province: Mersin
- District: Erdemli
- Elevation: 20 m (66 ft)
- Population (2022): 2,634
- Time zone: UTC+3 (TRT)
- Postal code: 33730
- Area code: 0324

Ayaş is a neighbourhood in the municipality and district of Erdemli, Mersin Province, Turkey. Its population is 2,634 (2022). Before the 2013 reorganisation, it was a town (belde).

== Geography ==
Ayaş lies on the Turkish state highway D.400. It is located 55 kilometers (34 mi) away from Mersin and 18 kilometres (11 mi) from Erdemli. The town is situated at the Mediterranean coast and there are two beaches of touristic potential, Yemişkumu and Merdivenkuyu.

== History ==
Ayaş had been inhabited since the ancient ages. Ancient Ayas was an island named Elaiussa and a town on the shore facing the island named Sebaste. Archelaus of Cappadocia had a palace in Elaiussa. But the island had since been joined the mainland because of alivion accumulation. During middle age, Elaiussa Sebaste lost its former importance. After the 12th century, the ruins of the former town became a battle ground between the Armenian Kingdom of Cilicia and the Karamanids. The area around the former town was incorporated into Ottoman Empire in the 15th century and it became the grazing area of a nomadic Turkmen tribe named Ayaş. A part of the tribe settled in the village named after Ayaş and, in 1989, it was incorporated into Kumkuyu municipality on the east. In 1999, Ayaş was declared a town and issued from Kumkuyu municipality.

== Economy ==
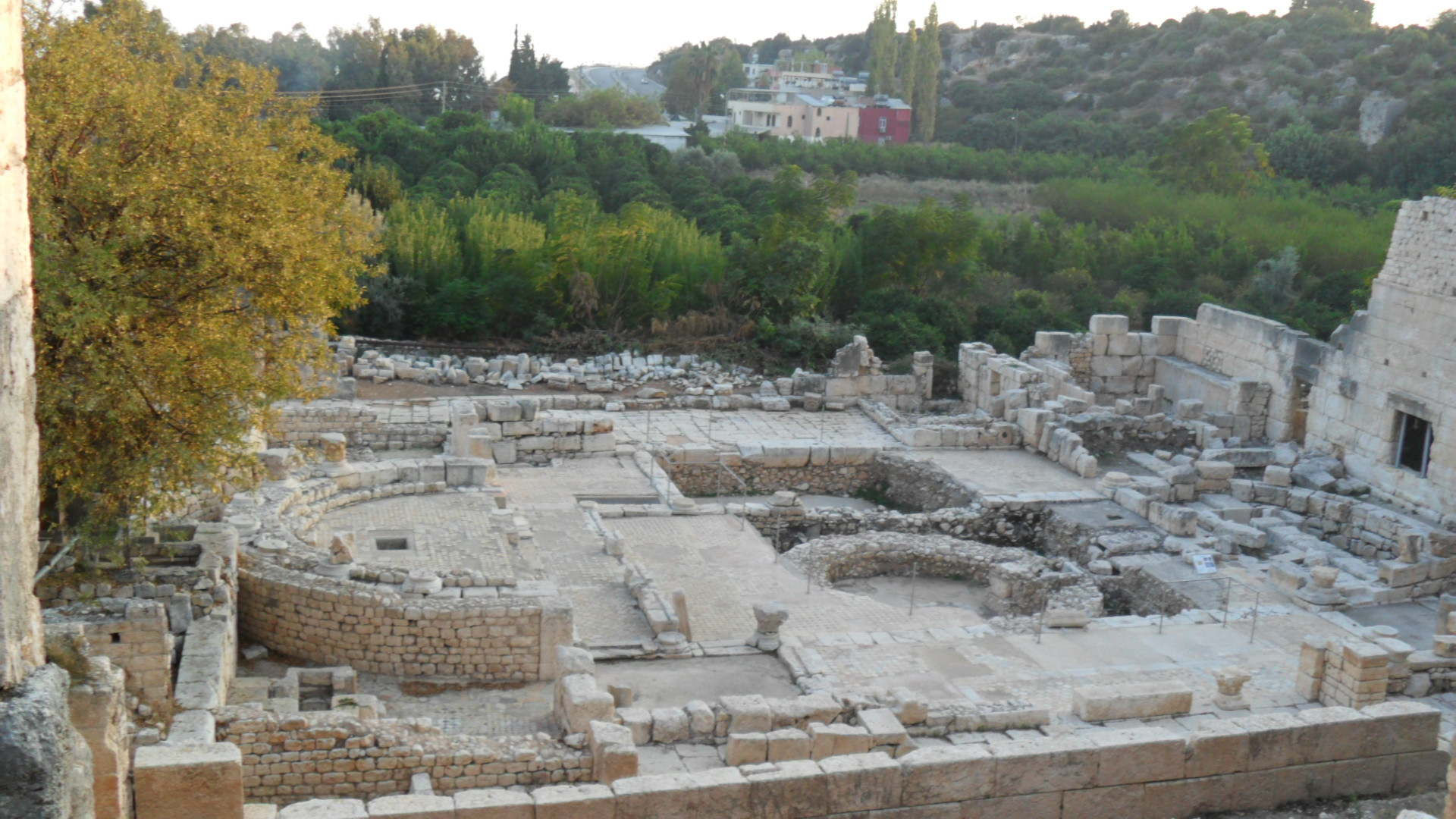
The town houses and the ruins next to each other

Like most towns around, Ayaş economy depends on vegetable agriculture. Tourism has begun to play a role in the town's economy and there are hotels, beaches and summer houses.

== See also ==
- Kanlıdivane
- Çanakçı rock tombs
