= Kanytelis =

Inland town of ancient Cilicia

Coordinates: 36°31′33″N 34°10′42″E

Kanytelis was an inland town of ancient Cilicia, inhabited during the Hellenistic, Roman, and Byzantine eras. Its name does not appear among ancient authors but is inferred from epigraphic and other evidence.

Its site is located near Kanlıdivane in Asiatic Turkey.

== Gallery ==
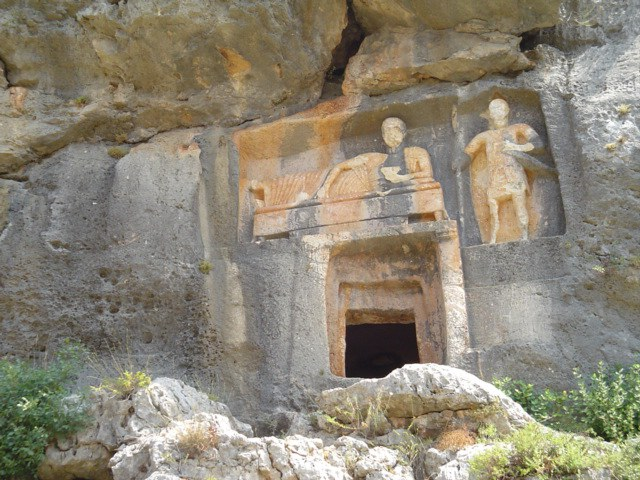
Detail of a relief in the necropolis.

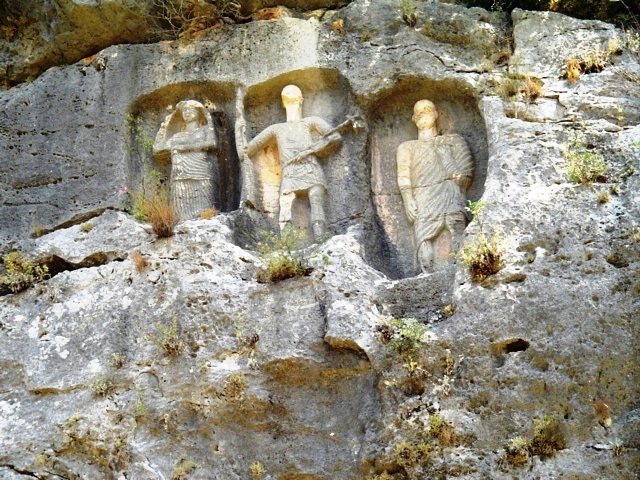
Rock cut tombs.

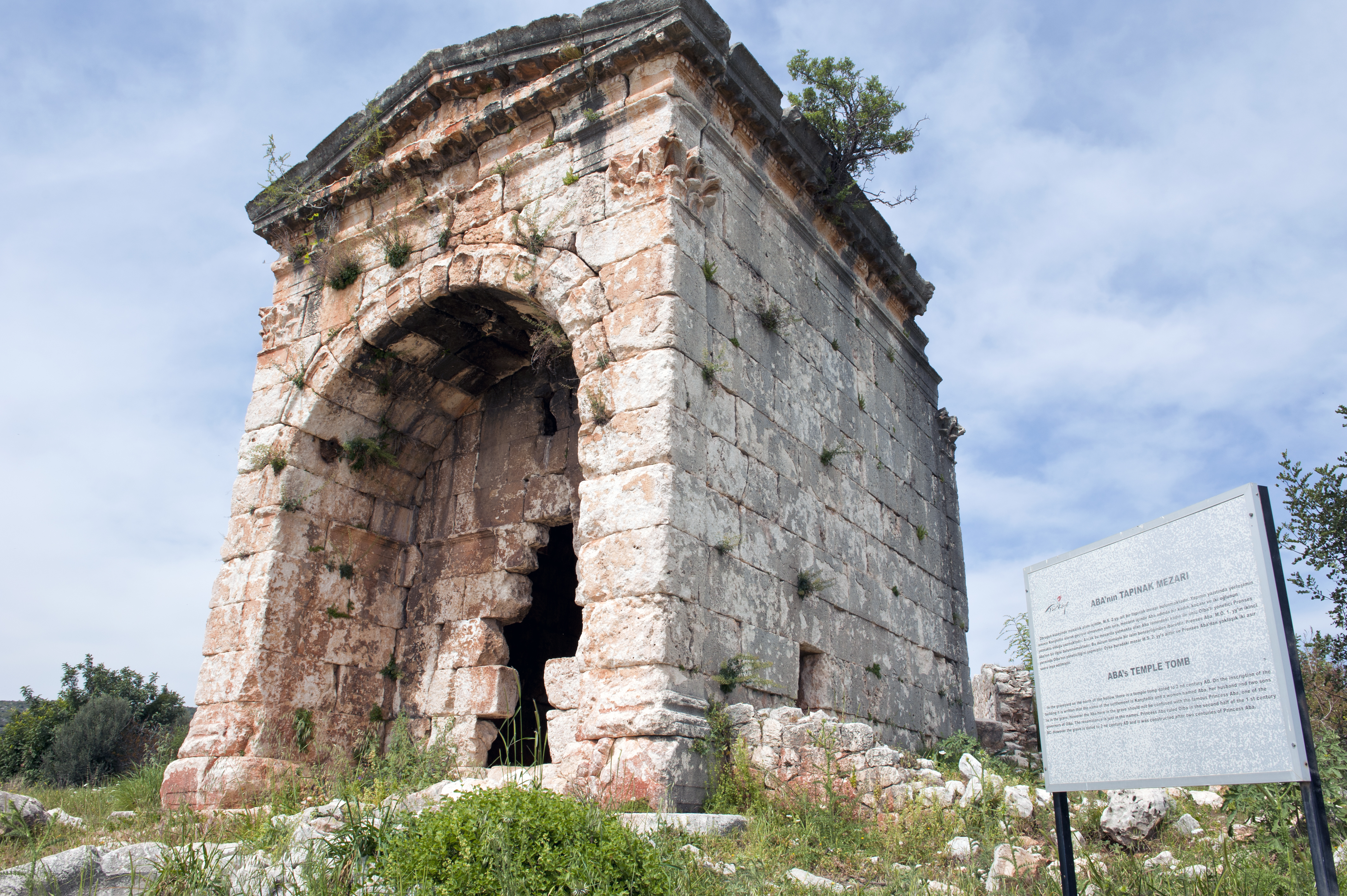
Temple tomb.

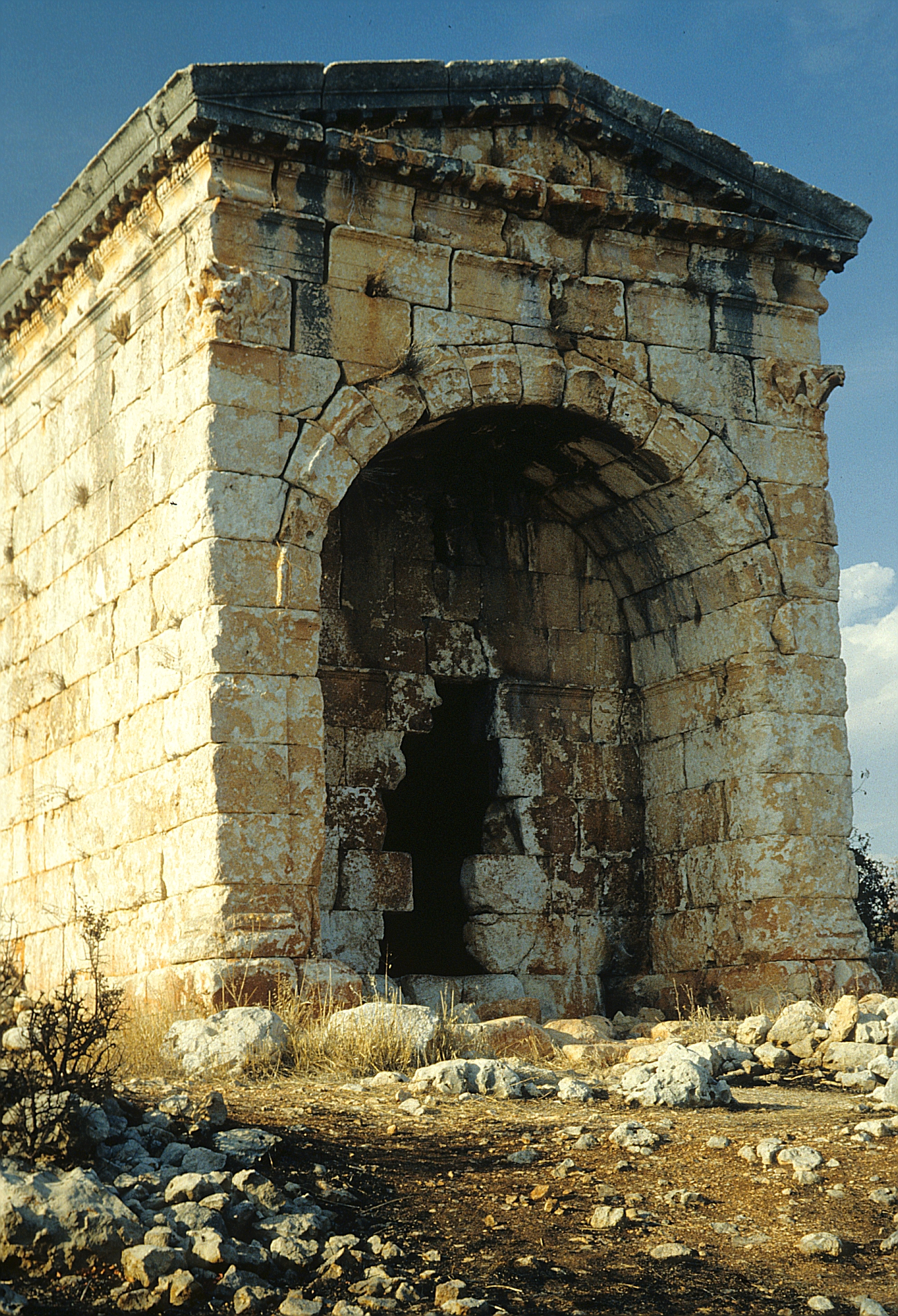
Temple tomb.

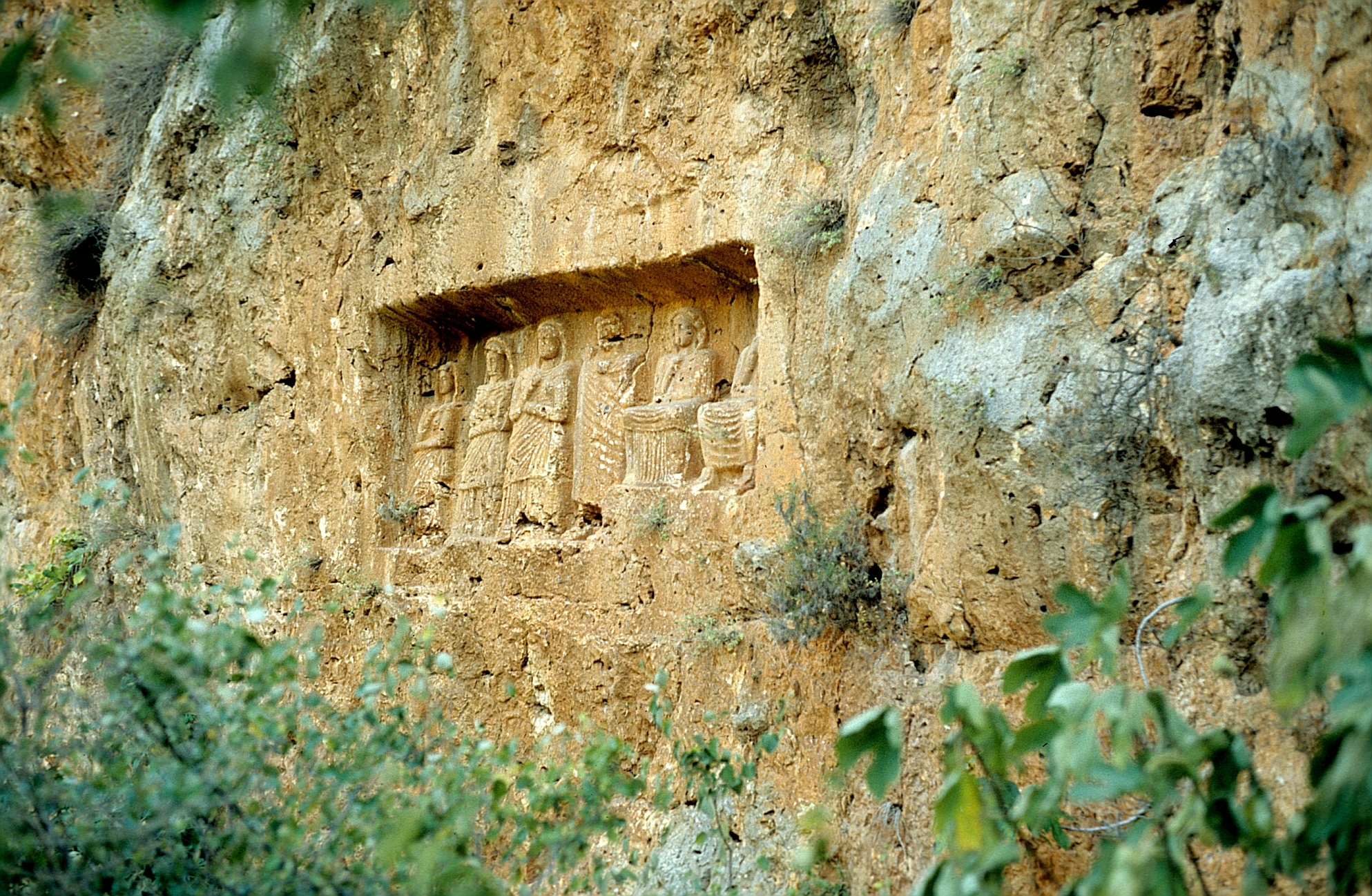
Armaronksas family tomb.
