= Emirzeli =

Hellenistic ruins in southern Turkey

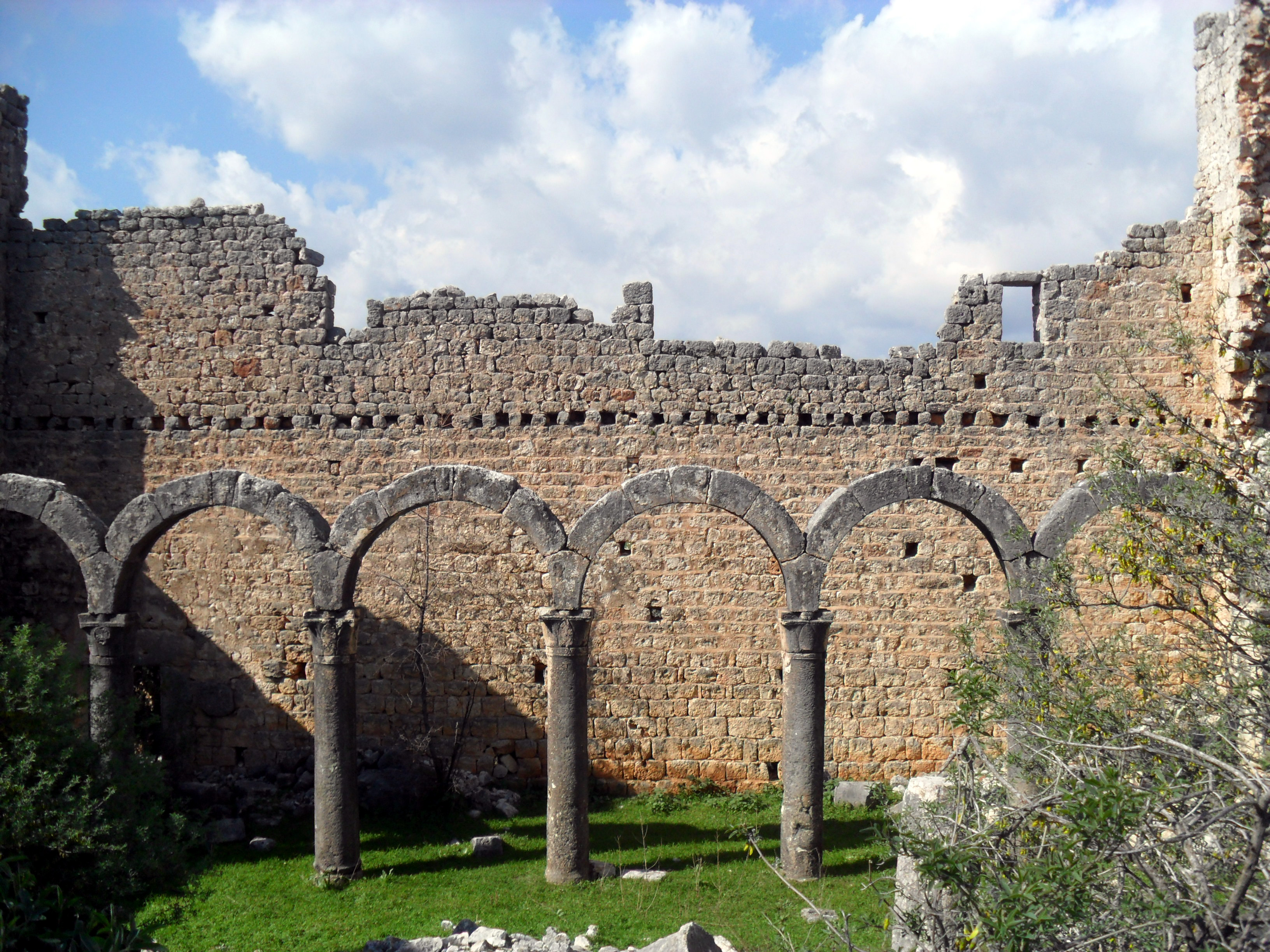
- Second church in Emirzeli

- Location within Turkey
- 36°32′N 34°06′E
- Type: Settlement
- Periods: Hellenistic Age to Byzantine Empire
- Location: Erdemli, Mersin Province, Turkey
- Region: Mediterranean Region

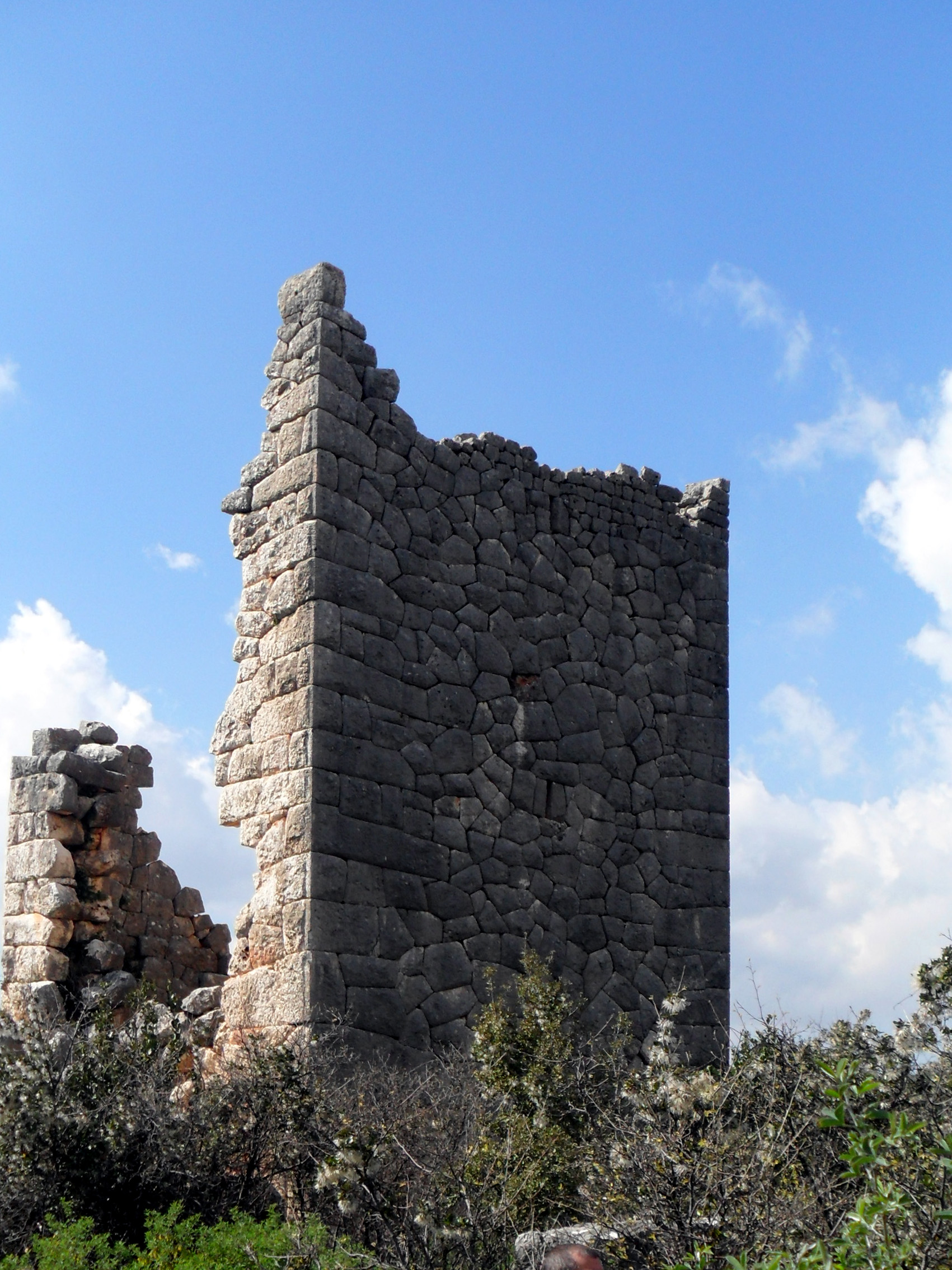
Hellenistic tower

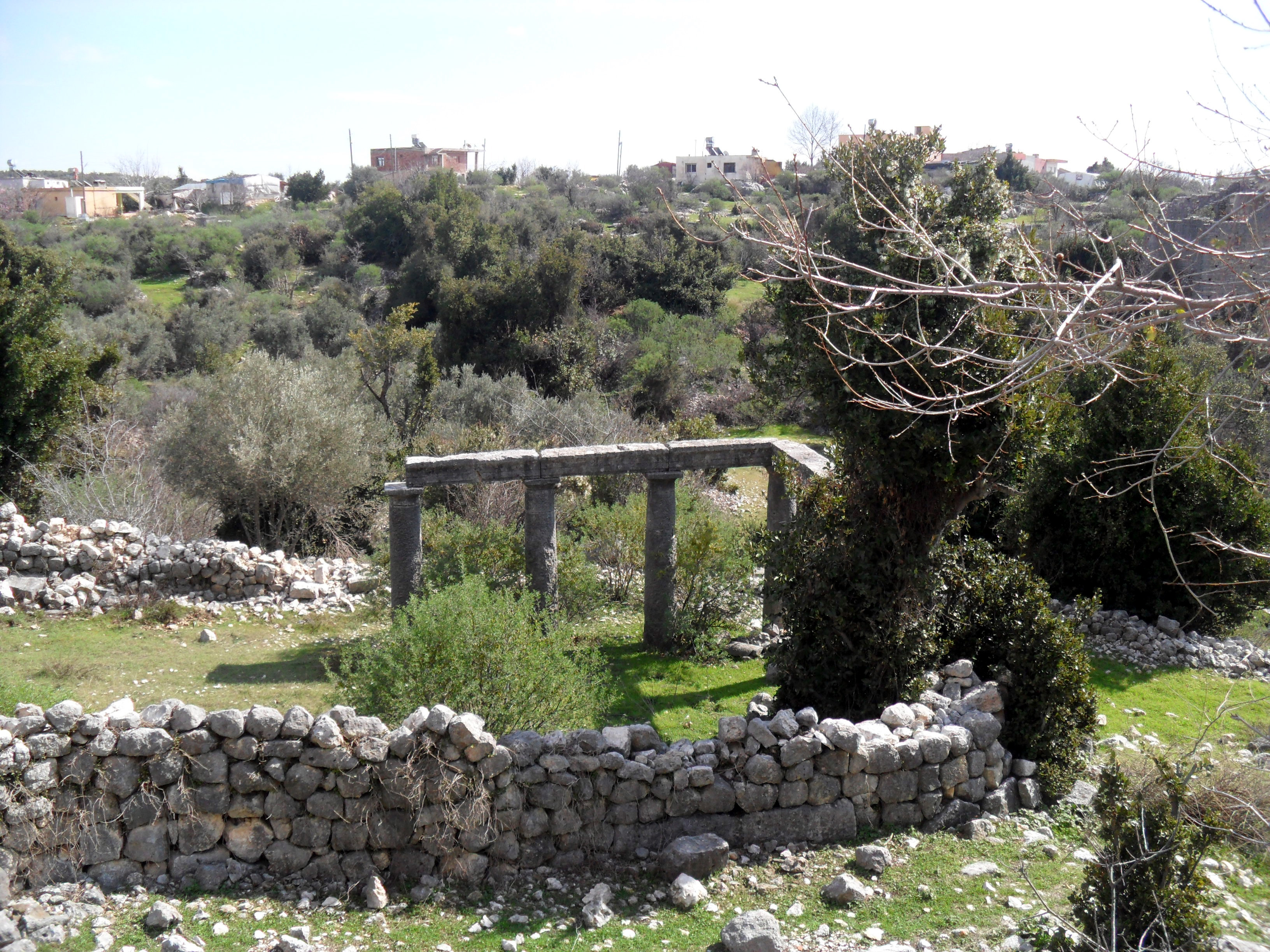
Pergola

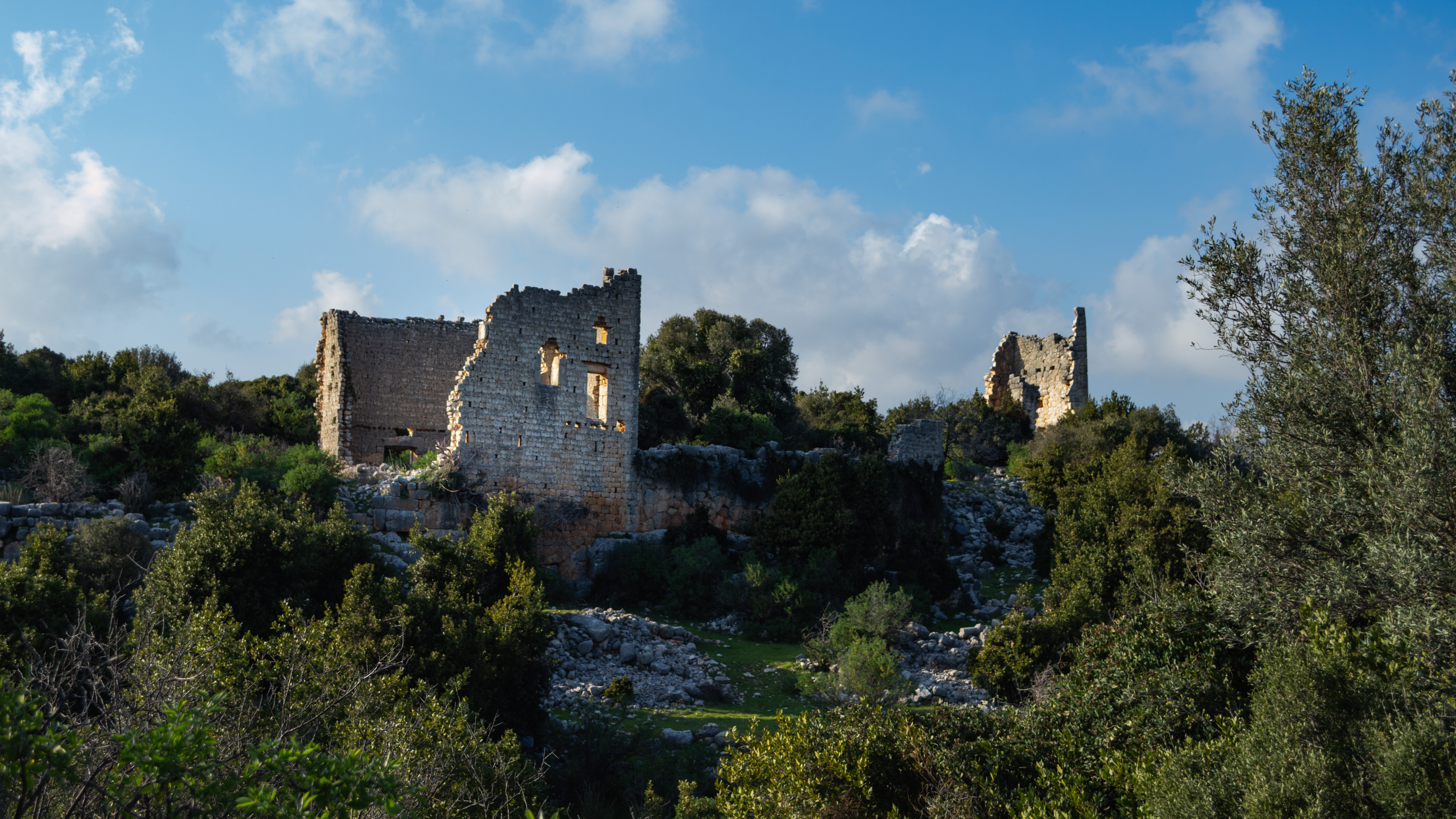
General view of ruined buildings at Emirzeli

Emirzeli (İmirzeli) is a group of ruins in Mersin Province, Turkey.

== Location ==
Emirzeli is a part of Karahmetli village in Erdemli district of Mersin Province. The road to Emirzeli detaches from Turkish state highway D.400. Kanlıdivane, an important religious center of the antiquity is also on this road. The distance from Emirzeli to Erdemli is 28 kilometres (17 mi) and to Mersin is 64 kilometres (40 mi).

== History ==
The earliest ruins in Emirzeli are from the Hellenistic era, dating to the 2nd century BC. The settlement was an important town of the Hellenistic kingdom of Olba. After the collapse of the Hellenistic states, the settlement became a part of the Roman and Byzantine Empires. Later the site seems to have been abandoned. The modern village was founded to the east of the site by a Turkmen tribe.

== Ruins ==
The castle at the north with polygonal masonry was built in the second century BC. Its dimensions are 105 x 60 m^{2} (345 x 200 ft^{2}), but only the tower at the east wall is standing. A phallus can be seen on the wall. Some stones of the castle were probably re-used in later buildings. To the south of the castle there is a part of stone pergola from the Roman era. On the south hill there are ruins of three basilica-style churches, probably from the early Byzantine era (5th or 6th century). The second church is partially standing.
