= Batısandal =

- Neighbourhood
- Location in Turkey
- Coordinates: 36°34′N 34°11′E
- Country: Turkey
- Province: Mersin
- District: Erdemli
- Elevation: 350 m (1,150 ft)
- Population (2022): 744
- Time zone: UTC+3 (TRT)
- Postal code: 33730
- Area code: 0324

Batısandal (meaning "west sandalwood" named after Santalum album, a common tree) is a neighbourhood in the municipality and district of Erdemli, Mersin Province, Turkey. Its population is 744 (2022). It is situated in the hilly region to the south of the Taurus Mountains. It is a dispersed settlement about 20 kilometres (12 mi) north west of Erdemli and 57 kilometres (35 mi) west of Mersin.

The village was founded by a Turkmen clan from Central Asia. Initially named Kelete, it was administratively included in Limonlu. In 1929, it was declared a village. There are historical ruins around the village such as an archaeological site (named Öküzlü), a church and Ottoman tombstones from the early 19th century. Main products of the village are vegetables and fruits. Olive and Laurus are also produced.
