= Akkale =

Archeological site in Erdemli, Mersin, Turkey

- (Tırtar Akkele)
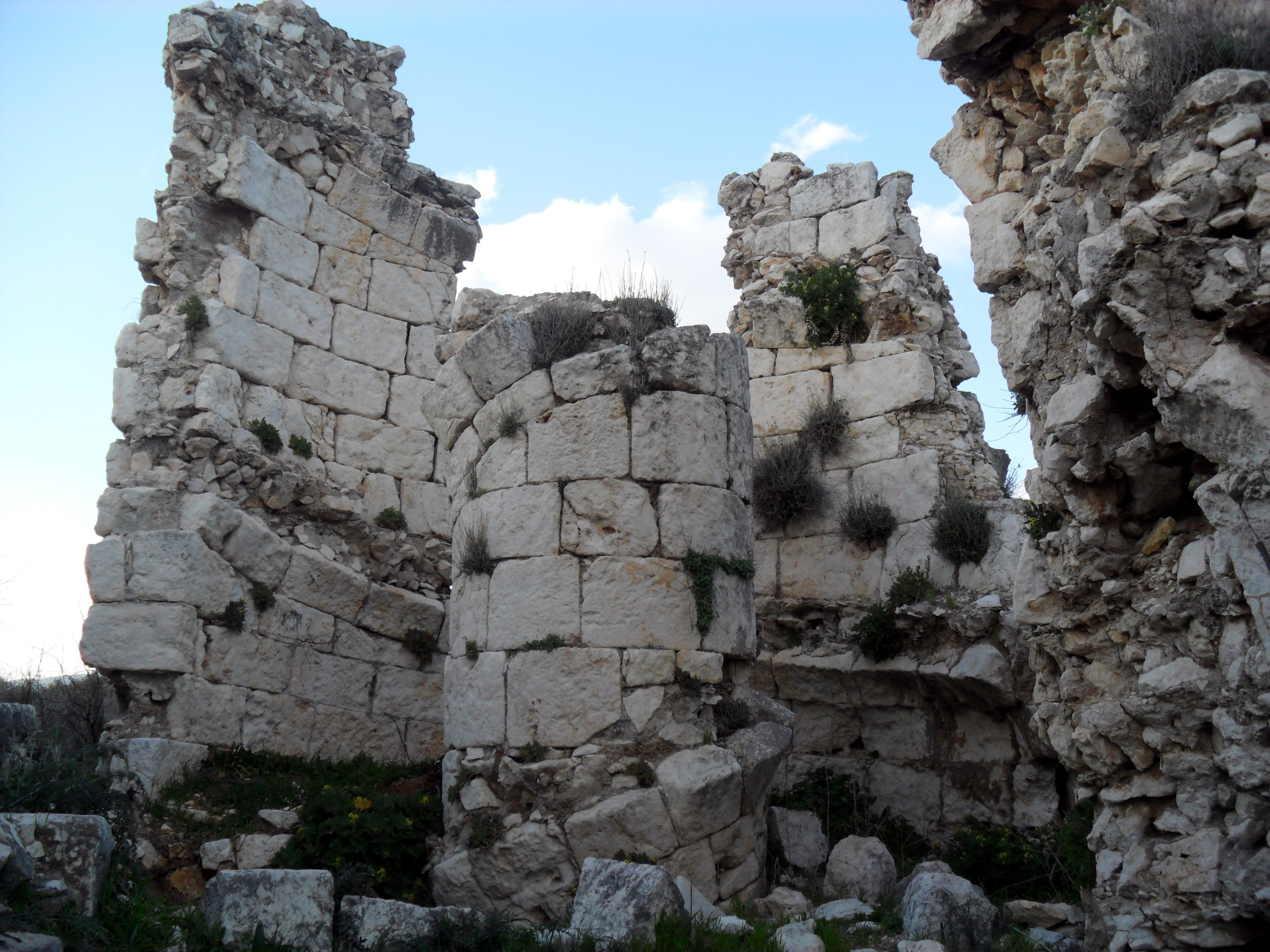
- Spiral staircase in Akkale

- Location within Turkey
- 36°22′N 34°13′E
- Type: Palace (?)
- Location: Erdemli, Mersin Province, Turkey
- Region: Cilicia Trachea

Site notes
- Archaeologists: Semavi Eyice and Dr. Robert W. Edwards
- Condition: In ruins

Akkale (literally "white castle") is the popular name given to ruins of a building complex in Kumkuyu town of Erdemli district, Mersin Province, Turkey

== Geography ==
Akkale (also called Tırtar Akkale where Tırtar is the former name of Kumkuyu) is situated to south west of Kumkuyu. Its distance to Erdemli is 14 kilometres (8.7 mi) and to Mersin is 51 kilometres (32 mi). The buildings are accessible by a short lane from the Turkish state highway D.400. The distance to Mediterranean Sea coast is about 250 metres (820 ft).

== History ==
The original name of the site is not known. But it was a port administration complex of the Roman Empire built in the 4th century. However, according to Turkish archaeologist Semavi Eyice the main building may be the palace of Archelaus of Cappadocia who lived in the first century and was known to spend summers in Cilicia. A part of the buildings were repaired during the Byzantine era probably after the great earthquakes of the 6th century.

== Technical details ==
Although the popular name Akkale means "White castle", the complex was not a castle, but a small, wealthy settlement. It consists of the ruins of the main building, which was once five stories in height, a large cistern, and numerous other constructions. The five-story building is traditionally called a palace (Turkish: Akkale sarayı), for it may have been used both as the office and the lodging building of the governor. The corbels which are on all sides of the building indicate the existence of a now completely demolished balcony which circumscribed the building. The main staircase of the building was a spiral staircase. A small building is assumed to be the treasury office where documents may have been kept in the basement. The cistern is one of the biggest cisterns in Cilicia with over 17,000 cubic metres (600,000 cu ft). It was used to sell water to ships.

Within this complex is a free-standing rectangular structure which has one of the region’s few extant domes on pendentives and was thought to be a church. However, in 1989 an archaeological study was published with a plan, which describes the site as a mausoleum. This cruciform building was constructed with beautifully cuts blocks of limestone masonry.
