= Karaahmetli, Erdemli =

Karaahmetli İmirzeli
- Neighbourhood
- Location within Turkey
- Coordinates: 36°33′N 34°08′E
- Country: Turkey
- Province: Mersin
- District: Erdemli
- Elevation: 600 m (2,000 ft)
- Population (2022): 419
- Time zone: UTC+3 (TRT)
- Postal code: 33730
- Area code: 0324

Karaahmetli is a neighbourhood in the municipality and district of Erdemli, Mersin Province, Turkey. Its population is 419 (2022). Situated in the plateau to the south of the Toros Mountains, at 36°33′N 34°07′E, the neighborhood is 26 kilometres (16 mi) away from Erdemli and 62 kilometres (39 mi) away from Mersin.

== History ==
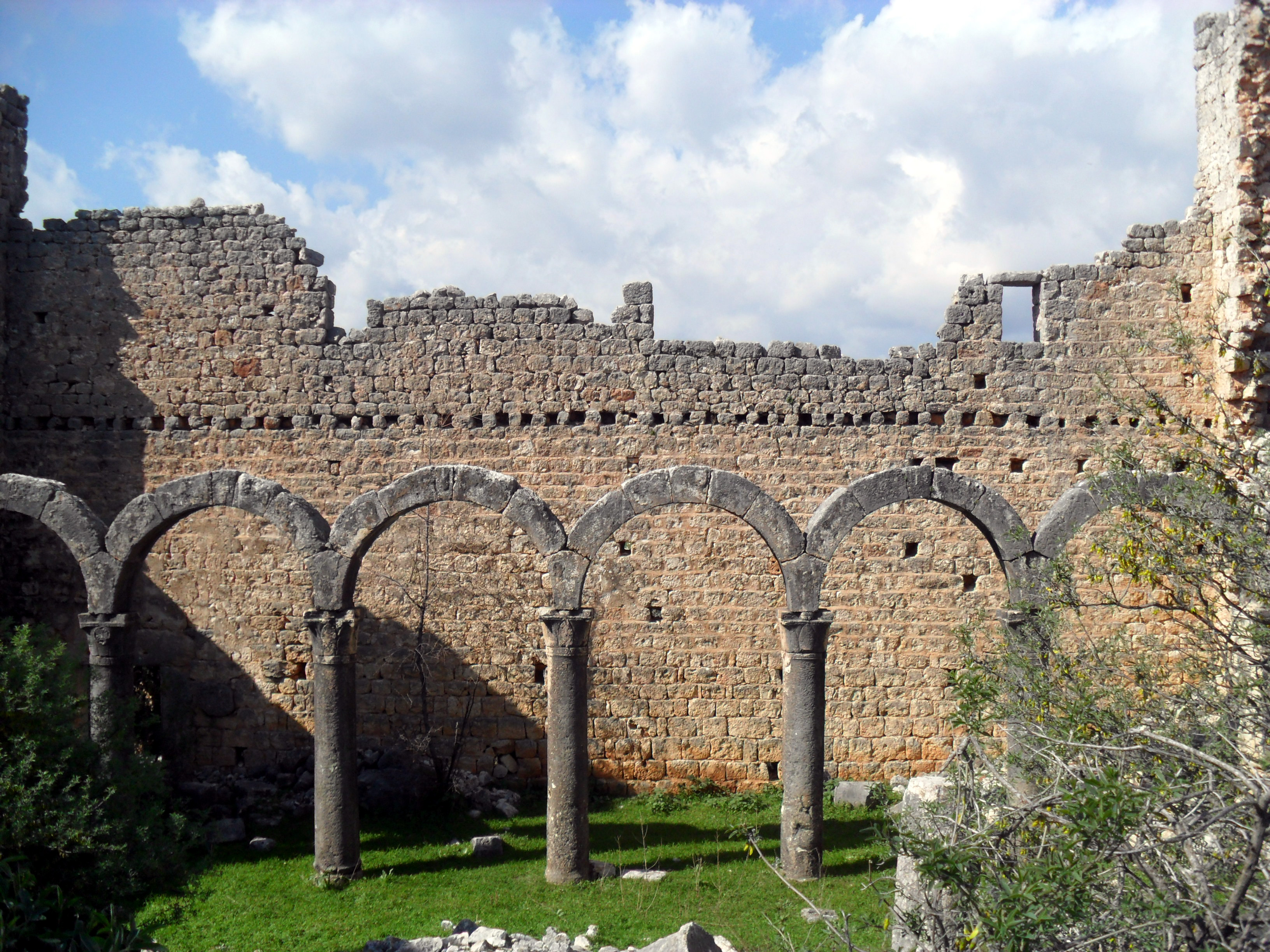
İmirzeli

The village was probably founded by a Turkmen tribe in the Middle Ages. The name of the village refers to the founder of the village. In the vicinity of the village, many early Byzantine religious ruins can be found, and the village may be described as an open-air museum. Especially the ruins of a 5th- or 6th-century church (now called Emirzeli) is an important example of Byzantine architecture.

== Economy ==
Animal husbandry, which once constituted the major economic sector of the village, is on the decline. The main agricultural crops are tomato, cucumber, olive and some fruits. Although the village hosts valuable archeological sites, at the moment, tourism plays no part in the village's economy.
