= Tapureli =

Tapureli Tahtalı
- Neighbourhood
- Location in Turkey
- Coordinates: 36°39′N 34°04′E
- Country: Turkey
- Province: Mersin
- District: Erdemli
- Elevation: 1,040 m (3,410 ft)
- Population (2022): 1,076
- Time zone: UTC+3 (TRT)
- Postal code: 33730
- Area code: 0324

Tapureli (former Tahtalı) is a neighbourhood in the municipality and district of Erdemli, Mersin Province, Turkey. Its population is 1,076 (2022). It is located 32 kilometres (20 mi) northwest of Erdemli and about 70 kilometres (43 mi) west of Mersin. The village was founded in the early 1800s by a Turkmen chieftain named Gökali. The name of the village refers to the rocky landscape that surrounds it. There are ruins of an ancient settlement called Tapureli ruins just 3 kilometres (1.9 mi) southwest of the village.
