= Çanakçı Rock Tombs =

Rock carved figures in Mersin Province, Turkey

The Çanakçı Rock Tombs are a group of rock-carved tombs in ancient Cilicia, and in modern Mersin Province, Turkey, right beside Kanlıdivane.

== Geography ==
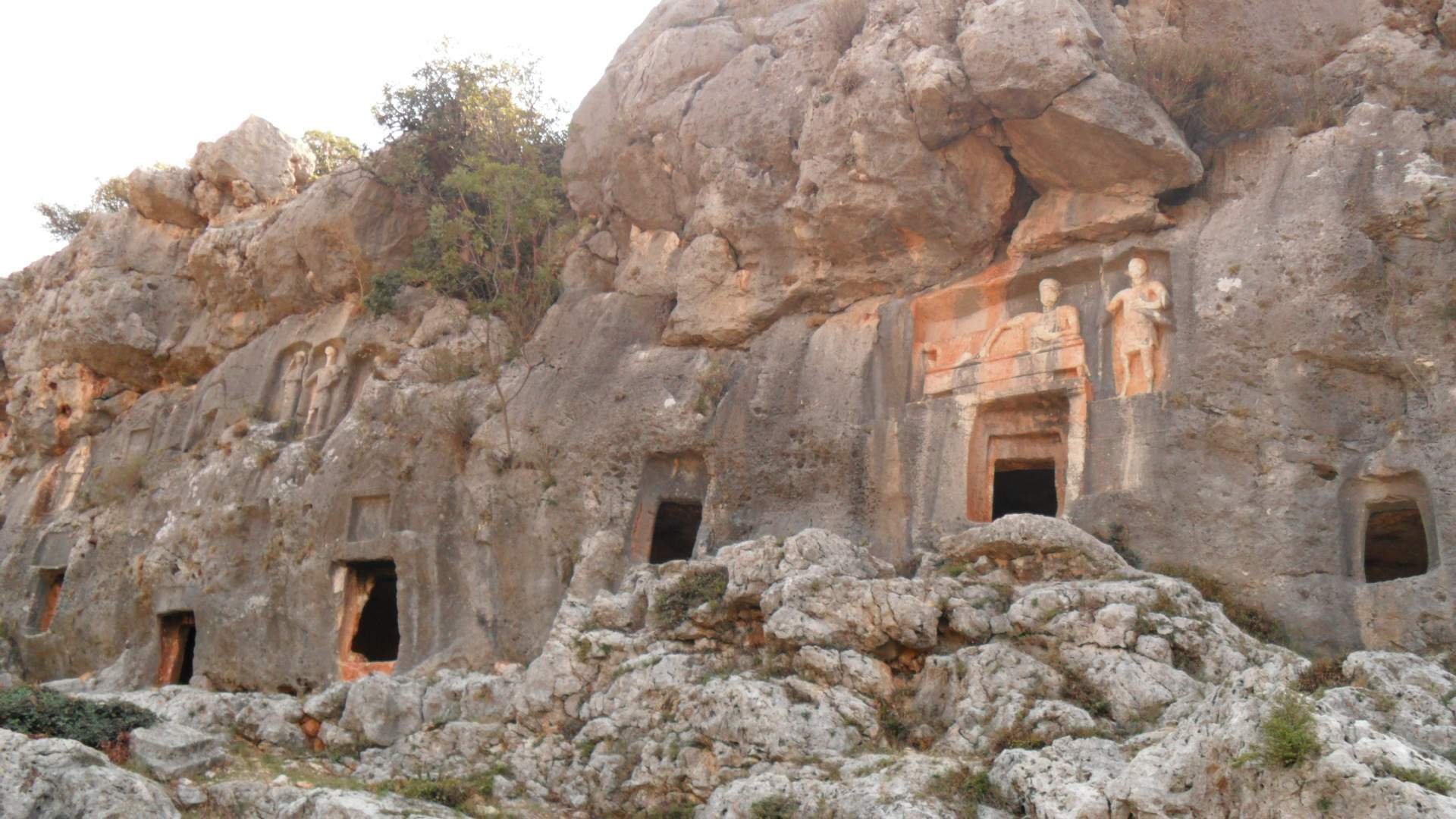

The Çanakçı Rock Tombs are at about 36°31′24″N 34°10′27″E a few hundred meters west of the Kanlıdivane sink hole. The general altitude of the area is around 225 metres (738 ft).They are sculpted on rocks on the southern side of a road running parallel to D.400 and the Mediterranean coastline at an altitude a few meters above the level of the road. The distance to Kumkuyu town is 6 kilometres (3.7 mi) to Erdemli is 19 kilometres (12 mi) and to Mersin is 56 kilometres (35 mi).

== The tombs ==
The tombs form part of the western necropolis of Kanlıdivane and were carved around the 2nd century AD, during the period of the Roman Empire. Each chamber has a rectangular opening which could be closed with a stone block and most contain three tombs. Above most of the entrances are carved figures of the deceased including a soldier with a lance and battle-axe, a man reclining on a couch and two women. Two of the inscriptions survive, one condemning potential grave robbers and saying that they will be forced to pay a fine to a local temple. The names of two of the deceased, Appas and Hekataios, also survive.
