= Tapureli ruins =

Ruins of an ancientcity in Mersin Province, Turkey

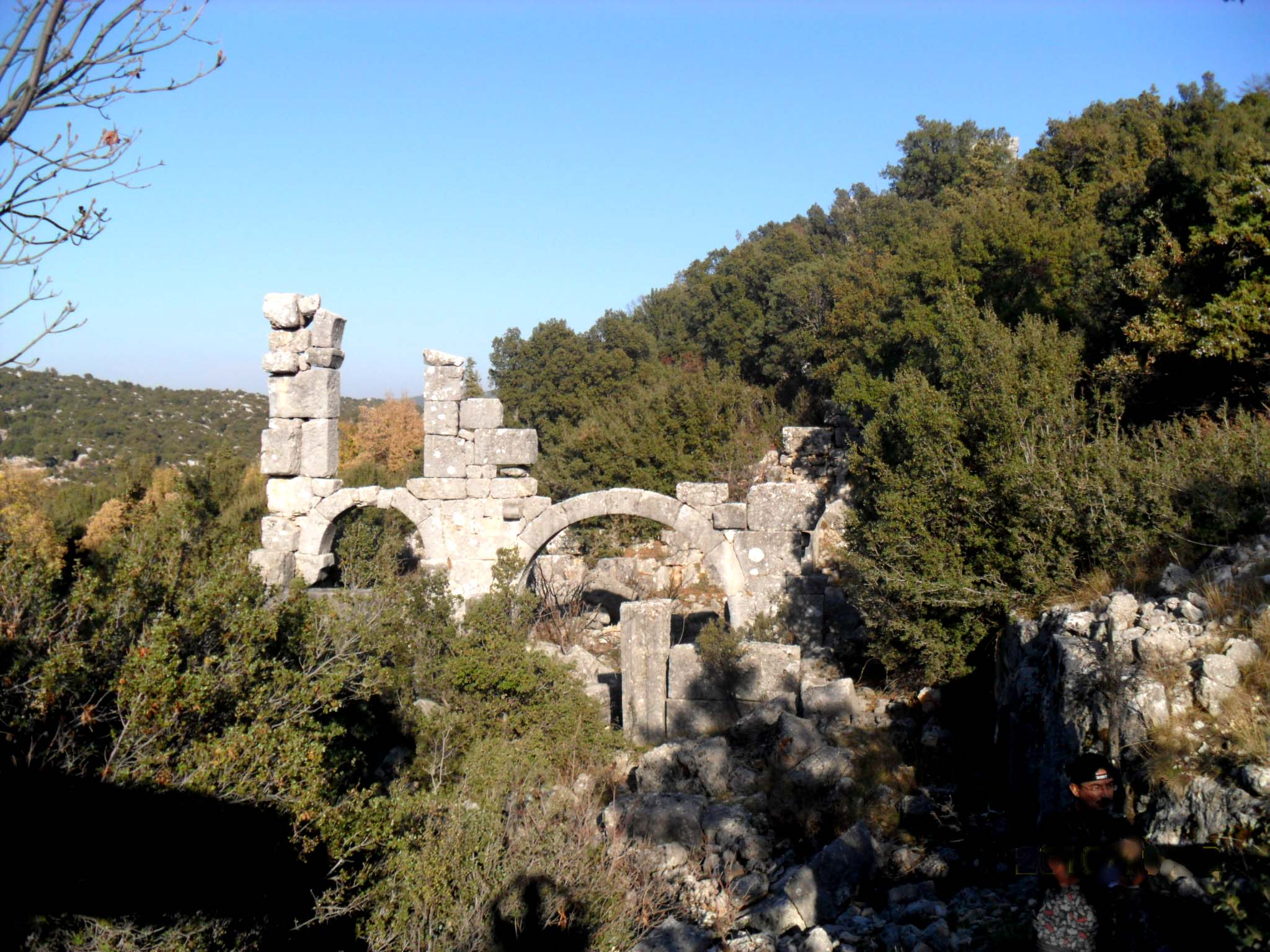
Ruins from the west

Tapureli ruins are in Mersin Province, Turkey.

== Geography ==
Limonlu River is a small river in Erdemli district of Mersin Province. It was named Lamos River in the antiquity and it was usually taken as the borderline between Cilicia Trachaea and Cilicia Pedias. Tapureli ruins are situated on a plateau which overlooks the canyon of the river at about 36°39′N 34°02′E. The ruins are named after the Turkmen village about 3.5 kilometres (2.2 mi) north east of the ruins. The altitude of the ruins which are embosomed by the dense forestry is 1,080 metres (3,540 ft). The distance to Erdemli is 35 kilometres (22 mi) and to Mersin is 70 kilometres (43 mi)

== The ruins ==
The original settlement was a Hellenistic settlement which was rebuilt during Roman (and early Byzantine) era. The ruins which are more or less devastated are examples of civil architecture including five churches, a necropolis, a horizontal sundial, cisterns as well as houses. The finds retrieved after the excavations carried on in the eastern church code named A are now exhibited in Mersin Archaeological Museum.

== See also ==
- Tapureli
