= Tırtar, Erdemli =

Settlement in Turkey

Tırtar Kumkuyu
- Neighbourhood
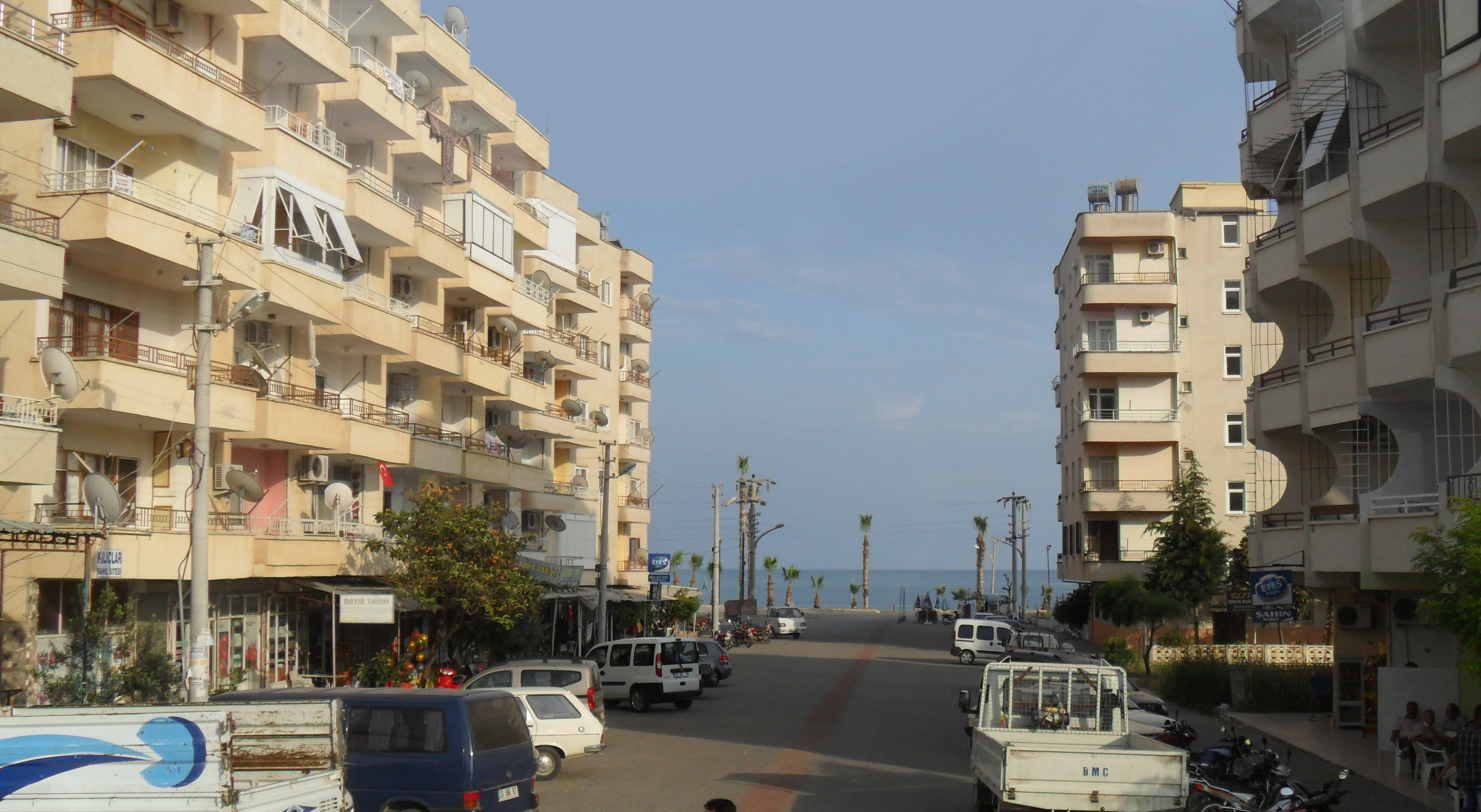

- Location within Turkey
- Coordinates: 36°32′15″N 34°13′50″E
- Country: Turkey
- Province: Mersin
- District: Erdemli
- Elevation: 10 m (33 ft)
- Population (2022): 2,733
- Time zone: UTC+3 (TRT)
- Postal code: 33730
- Area code: 0324

Tırtar (formerly: Kumkuyu) is a neighbourhood in the municipality and district of Erdemli, Mersin Province, Turkey. Its population is 2.733 (2022). Before the 2013 reorganisation, it was a town (belde).

== Geography ==
Kumkuyu is a Mediterranean coastal town in the rural area of Erdemli ilçe (district). It is on the Turkish state highway D.400 which traverses south Anatolia from west to east. The distance to Erdemli is 13 kilometres (8.1 mi) and to Mersin is 50 kilometres (31 mi).

== History ==
The vicinity of the town had been inhabited in the ancient ages. There is a big aqueduct as well as cisterns, rock tanks for olive oil and the ruins of a fort against pirates constructed during Roman Empire. (Kanlıdivane, the ancient religious center is a few kilometers north of Kumkuyu.) But modern settlement began only after the 1950s. The residents of Kumkuyu are the members of a former nomadic Turkmen (Oghuz Turk) tribe named Tırtar. In 1989 Kumkuyu was declared a township.

== Economy ==
Agriculture, especially greenhouse cultivation, has replaced the traditional animal husbandry. The main crops used are citrus and bananas. The tourism potential (historic and beach) is promising. At the moment there are a few holiday hotels on the coastline, but the number is on the rise.

== See also ==
- Akkale
