= Kanlıdivane =

Sinkhole with ruins in Mersin Province, Turkey

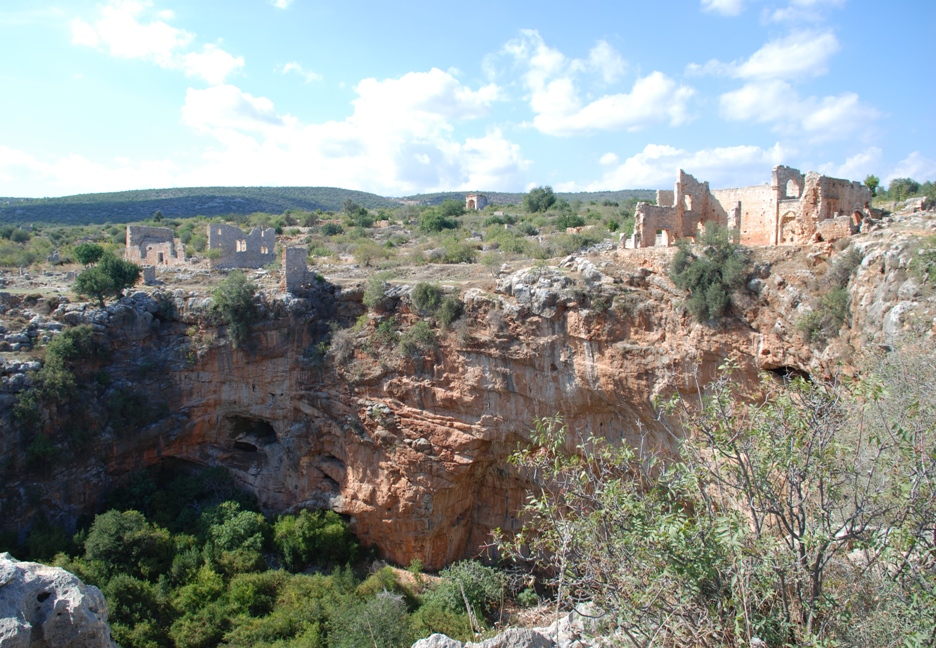
From the south

Kanlıdivane (ancient Canytelis, Greek: Κανυτελής) is an ancient city situated around a big sinkhole in Mersin Province, Turkey.

== Geography ==
Kanlıdivane is in the rural area of Erdemli district, which is a part of Mersin Province at 36°31′32″N 34°10′45″E. It is 18 km (11 mi) to Erdemli and 55 km (34 mi) to Mersin. Its altitude is approximately 230 m (750 ft). It is close to the town Kumkuyu at the coast and just few hundred meters to Çanakçı rock tombs.

The sinkhole is quite wide; the longer dimension being 130 m (430 ft). The depth is about 70 m (230 ft)

== History ==
There are ruins of antiquity around the sinkhole. They were unearthed and surveyed by Victor Langlois and Semavi Eyice.

=== Pre Roman era ===
Kanlıdivane was a part of the Olba Kingdom in the ancient age. In the northern necropolis, there is a mausoleum, which was built by the Queen Aba for her husband and sons. On the inscription of the tower at south-west it reads; "Built by Teukros, the son of priest king Tarkyaris of Olba for Zeus."

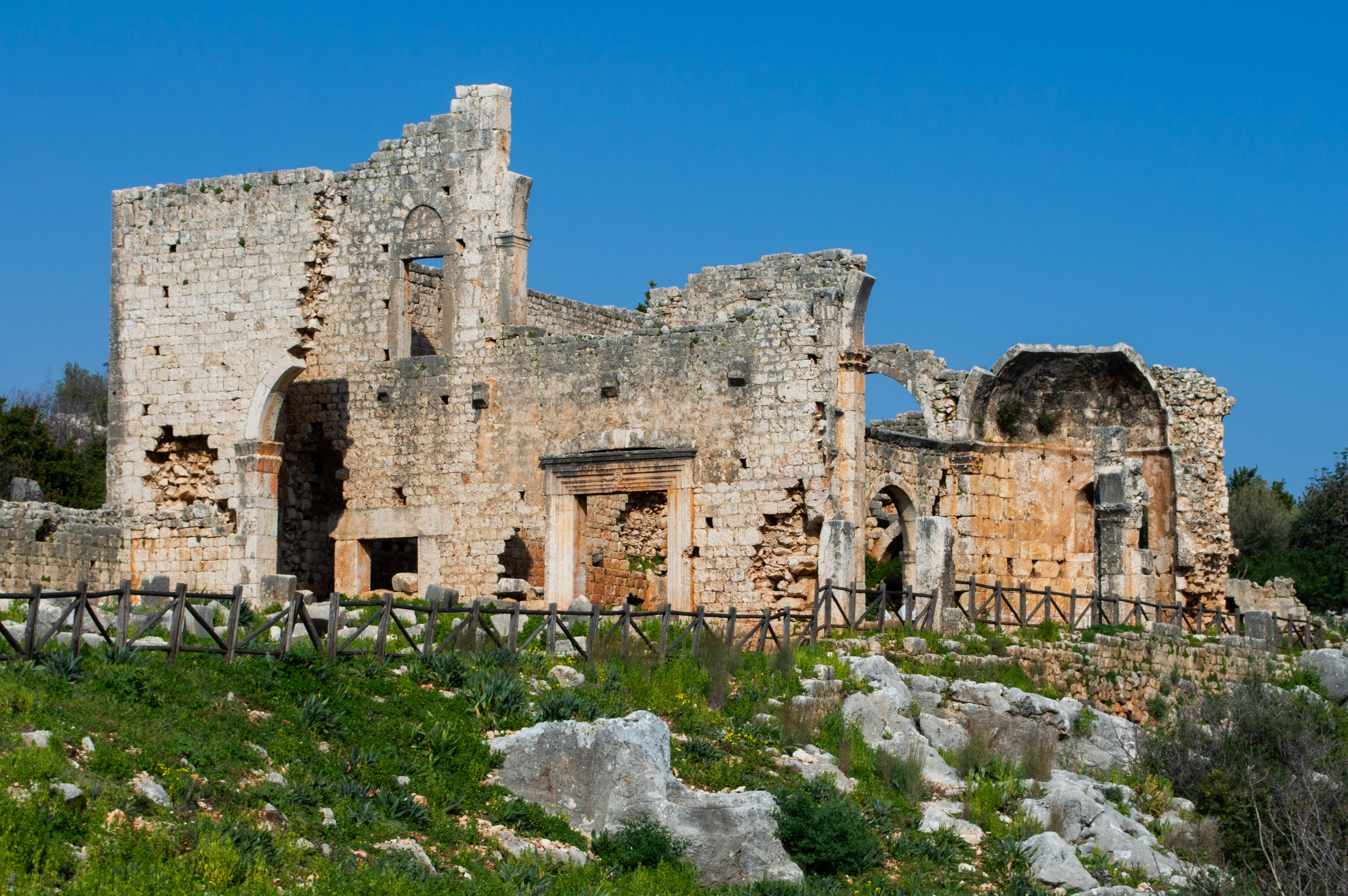
Church 4 from a general view

=== Roman era ===
By the first century, Olba kingdom became a vassal of the Roman Empire. Byzantine Emperor Theodosius II rebuilt the city as a Christian religious center and renamed it Neapolis. There are ruins of basilicas, cisterns, rock cut graves etc. around the sinkhole.

== Kanlıdivane in popular culture ==
The current Turkish name Kanlıdivane may be a corrupt form of the ancient name Canytelis. It means "bloody crazy". It may refer to the red color of the surrounding soil. The name may also refer to a dreadful legend according to which the criminals had been executed by throwing into the sinkhole during Roman times.

== Kanlıdivane in Mersin Music Festival ==
Every year during Mersin International Music Festival, one or two outdoor concerts are held in Kanlıdivane. The audiences and performers sit at the opposite sides of the sinkhole. (During such concerts Metropolitan municipality of Mersin add free bus trips to Kanlıdivane.)

== See also ==
- List of sinkholes of Turkey
- Kanytelis
