= Mersin Bus Terminus =

Bus terminal in Mersin, Turkey

Mersin Bus Terminus Mersin Otogarı (MEŞTİ)
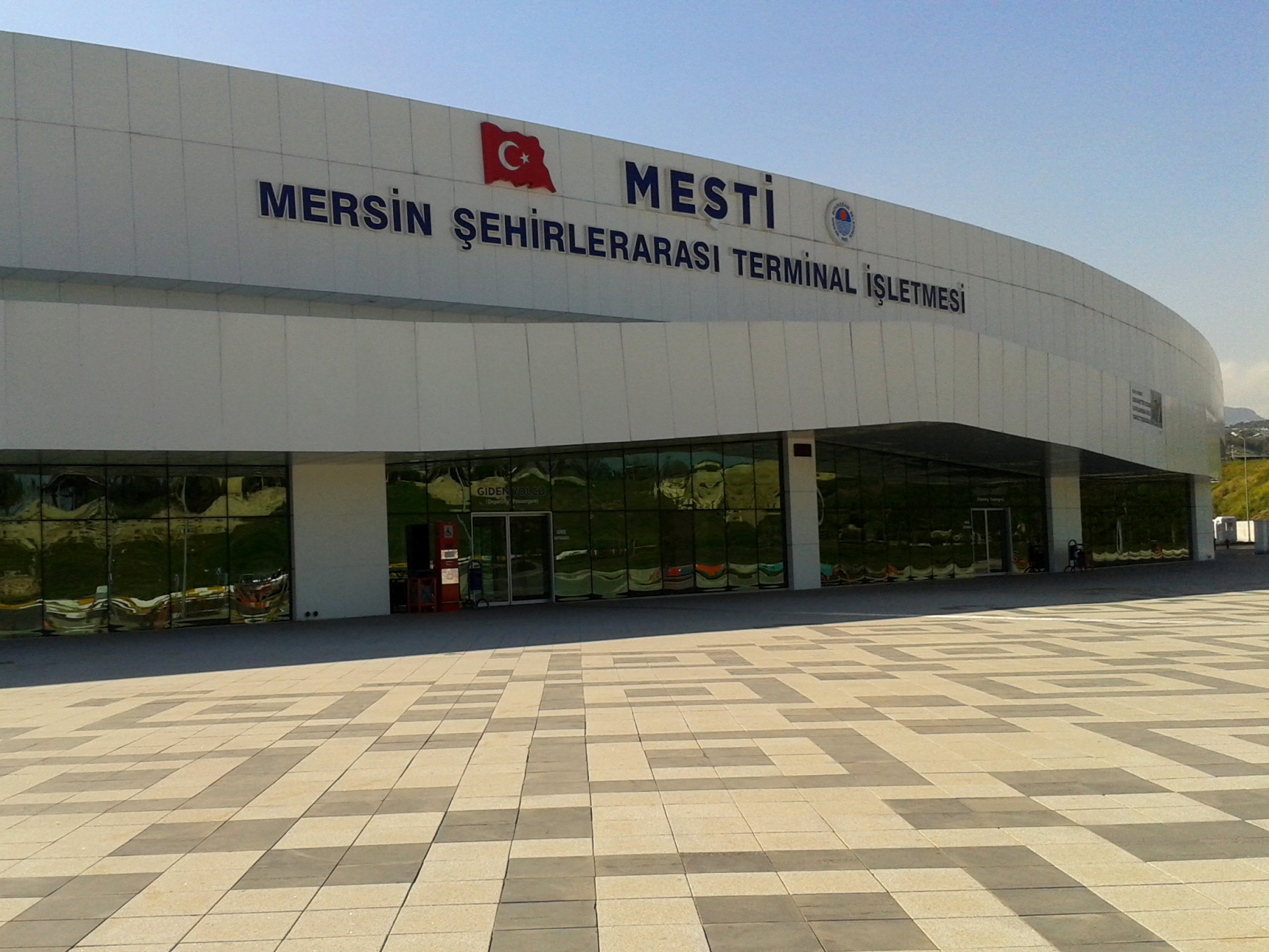
- Mersin Bus Terminus

General information
- Location: Çavuşlu, Toroslar, Mersin; Turkey
- Coordinates: 36.85395°N 34.58902°E
- Owner: Mersin Metropolitan Municipality
- Operator: Mersin Şehirlerarası Terminal İşletmesi (MEŞTİ)
- Platforms: 46 for departures, 25 fpor arrivals

Other information
- Status: Operational

History
- Opened: February 28, 2015; 11 years ago
Location

Mersin Bus Terminus (Turkish: Mersin Otogarı), also known as MEŞTİ for (Turkish: Mersin Şehirlerarası Terminal İşletmesi, English: Mersin Intercity Bus Terminus Management) is the newly built bus terminus of Mersin, Turkey for intercity bus service. Opened on 28 February 2015, it replaced the former bus terminus, which served from 1986.

== Location ==
The bus terminus is located in Çavuşlu neighborhood of Toroslar ilçe (intracity district). Its distance to the city center of Mersin is about 7 km (4.3 mi) and to the motorway O-51 is about 1 km (0.62 mi).

== Facility ==
The terminus complex was built by the Metropolitan Municipality of Mersin and it is owned by the operating company MEŞTİ, a subsidiary of the municipality. It was leased by MEŞTİ to a private company to ₺ 20 million (approx. US$7.7 million) annually for a three-year term.

It consists of three buildings. Situated in the north of the terminus complex, the main service building covers an area of 5,500 m^{2} (59,000 sq ft) and has a semi-circular architectural plan. The building accommodates ticket offices of the long-distance bus companies and a shopping mall for passengers. The two other buildings of the terminus complex have a circular plan. One building serves as a bus station for short-distance busses while the other one is for the comfort of intercity bus crew.

The bus terminus has 46 platforms for departures situated in front of the west side of the main building, and 25 platforms for arrivals to its south. A parking lot capable of 1,000 cars is located east of the main building.

== Controversy ==
Right after the opening of the terminus, intercity bus companies declared not to use the facility because they find the rent amount for their ticket office too high. After demolition of the former terminus, the bus companies serve in provisory tents without entering the new terminus.
