= Tırmıl =

Castle, fortress in Akdeniz District

Tırmıl Castle
- Mersin, Turkey
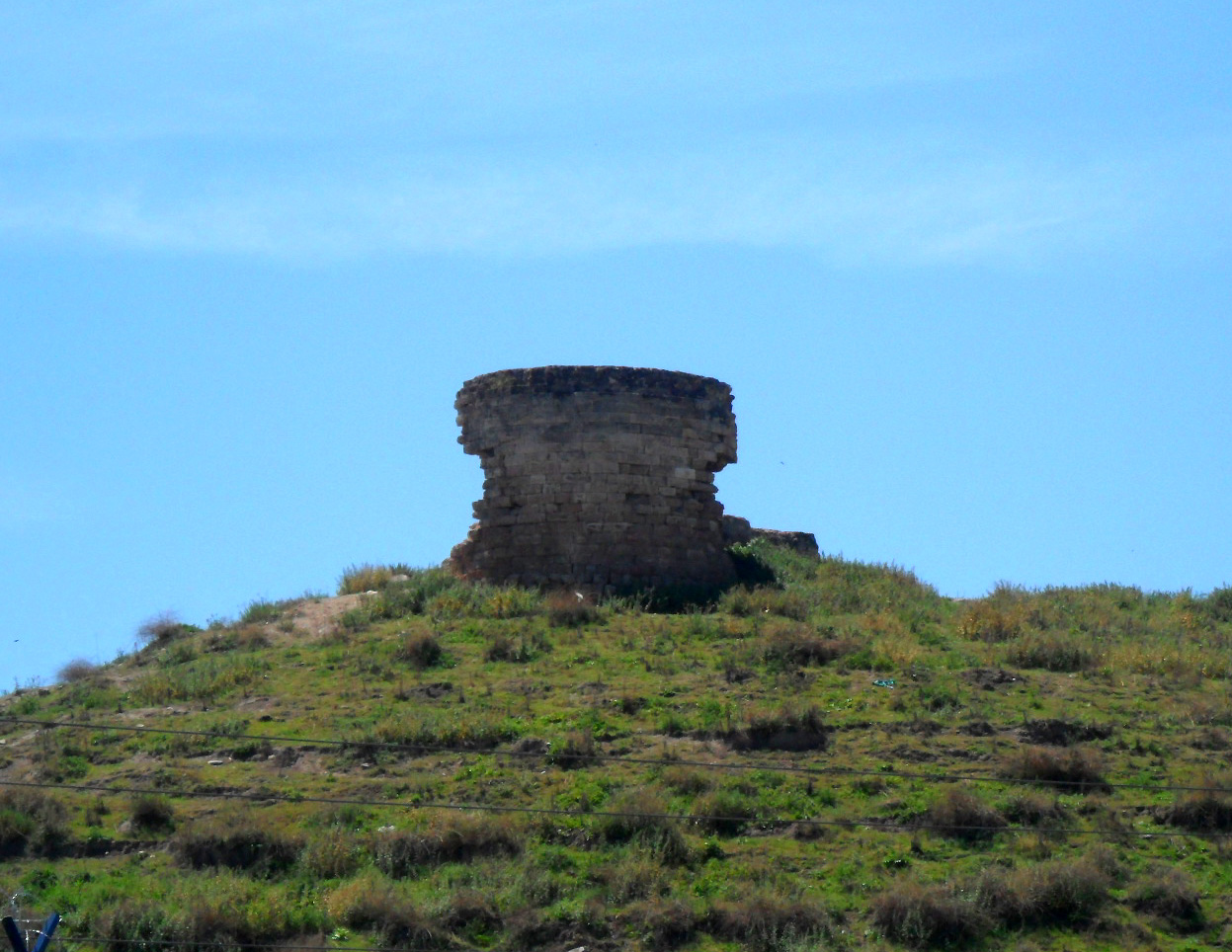
- The castle from the west

Site information
- Type: Fortress
- Open to the public: No
- Condition: Parts of two bastions

Location
- Coordinates: 36°49′33″N 34°39′44″E

Site history
- Built by: Chalcolithic
- Demolished: Mostly

Tırmıl (also Tırmıl Höyük) is a tumulus (Turkish: höyük) in Mersin, Turkey.

== Geography ==
The tumulus is in the urban fabric of Mersin at about 36°49′33″N 34°39′44″E. It is located on top of a low hill with a circular area of about 130 metres (430 ft) radius. The grocery wholesales markets are to the west of the tumulus and newly developed cheap housing quarters of the city are to the east of the tumulus. But there is no modern structure on the tumulus. The bird's flight distance between Tırmıl and Yumuktepe, the oldest ruin in Mersin, is about 6 kilometres (3.7 mi).

== History ==
The site seems to be inhabited in the Chalcolithic age. The settlement continued up to the medieval age. But it is not mentioned in any ancient or medieval document. Probably the first reference to the tumulus was by Sir Francis Beaufort in 1812 who placed his theodolite on the hill during his mission in southern Turkey coasts. (See Caramania) . He was unaware of its historical significance. The tumulus was discovered in 1951 by Veronica Seton-Williams

== Finds ==
On the top of the tumulus the ruins of an ancient castle can be seen. Only two bastions one at the north east and one at the northwest are partially standing. There are traces of ancient pottery all over the tumulus.

== Neighbourhood ==
The name of the tumulus has been used as the name of the industrial site to the north of Tırmıl (Turkish: Tırmıl Sanayi Sitesi). The name is also used as the name of the first stop in the commuter trains from Mersin to Adana which is located to the south of Tırmıl. (see Adana-Mersin Regional)
