= Mersin Water Museum =

Museum in Mersin, Turkey

- Mersin Su Müzesi
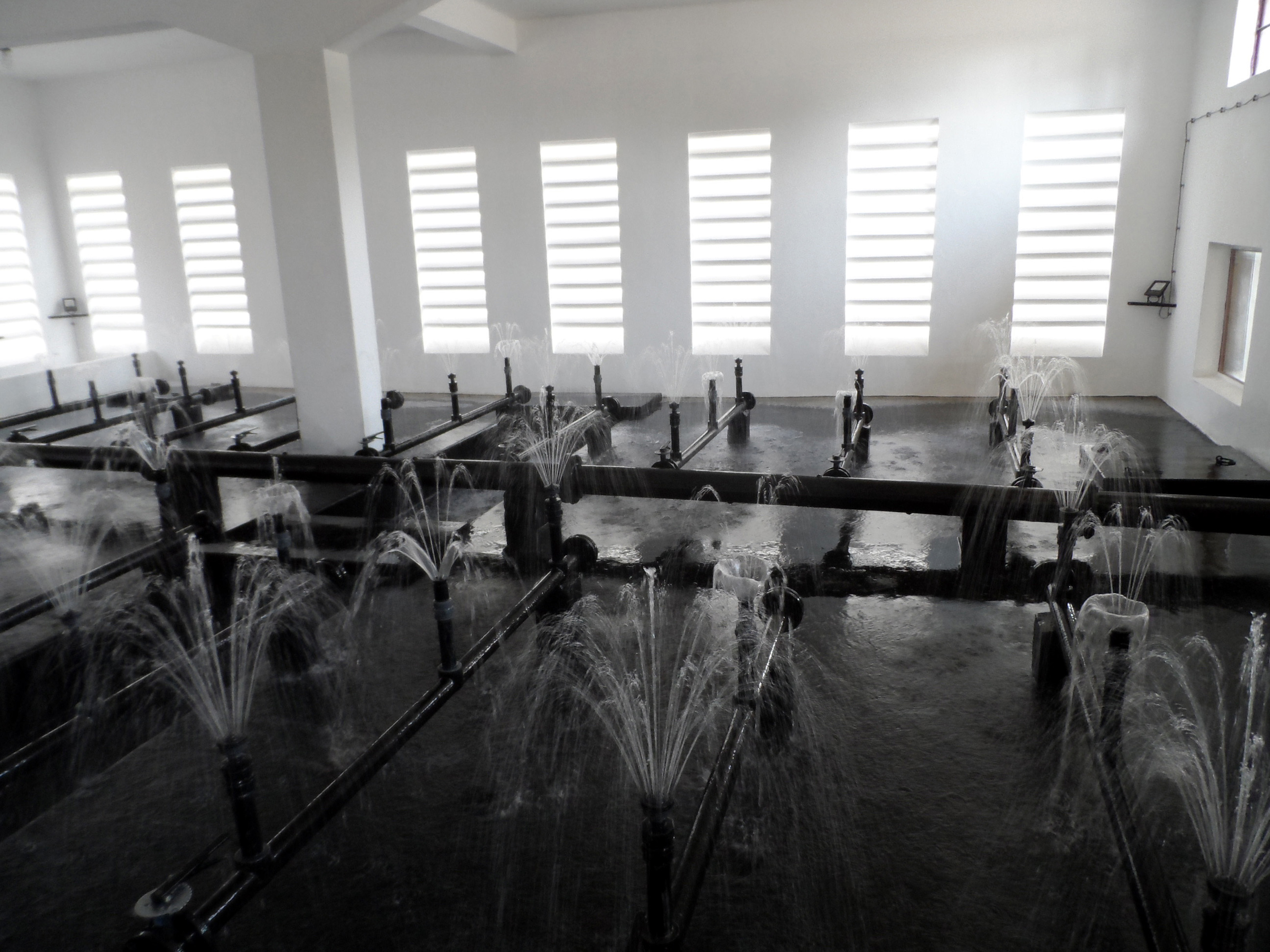
- Ventilation room of the Plant

- Location within Turkey
- Established: 2016
- Location: Akbelen cad. Mezarlık karşısı, Mersin, Turkey
- Coordinates: 36.8141°N 34.6045°E
- Type: Technological
- Owner: Mersin Municipality

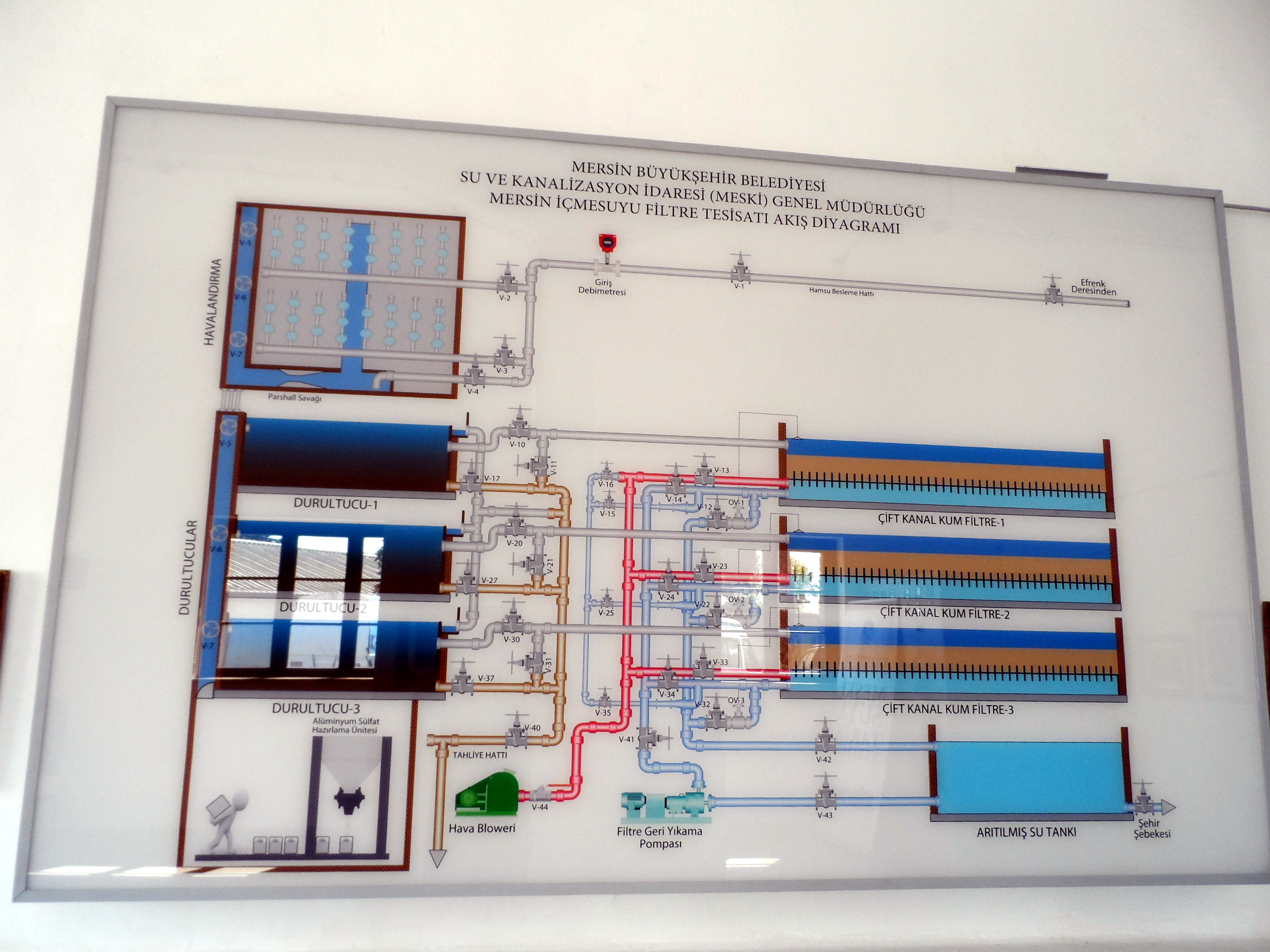
Mersin Water Museum Diagram of the water flow

Mersin Water Museum (Turkish: Mersin Su Müzesi) is a museum in Mersin, Turkey. In 2016 it was awarded by the Association of Turkish Historical Cities.

== Geography ==
The museum is in the Toroslar second level municipality in Mersin. It is sıtuated to the northwest of the intersection of two boulevards and in the workplace of Meski (Mersin Municipality Waterworks Office).

== History ==
The museum is a former water filtration plant of the Mersin city. The water source was Müftü River (also called Efrenk River). The plant was constructed by the municipality of Mersin during the mayorship of Mithat Toroğlu . The construction began in 1936 and it was officially opened on 5 January 1939 But Mersin is a fast growing city and the filtration plant for about 80000 soon fell short of the demand. In 1984 Mersin began to use water from Berdan River via a much bigger filtration plant and the former filtration plant was disabled. The plant was neglected for about 30 years. But finally the municipality decided to keep the plant as a museum. Following a restoration work of two years, the museum was opened on 21 April 2016. In the opening ceremony mayor Burhanettin Kocamaz said that an unpublished history of the city has been brought to light. Following the restoration, the pumps and the other machinery are still operable.

== The building ==
The building consists of a ground floor and a basement. In the ground floor there are a dosing room with an aluminium sulfate smasher, a ventilation room, a chlorination room, three filter pools and a staff room. The basement, called manoeuvre room is reserved for the control of the main valves.
