= Mersin =

- City and metropolitan municipality
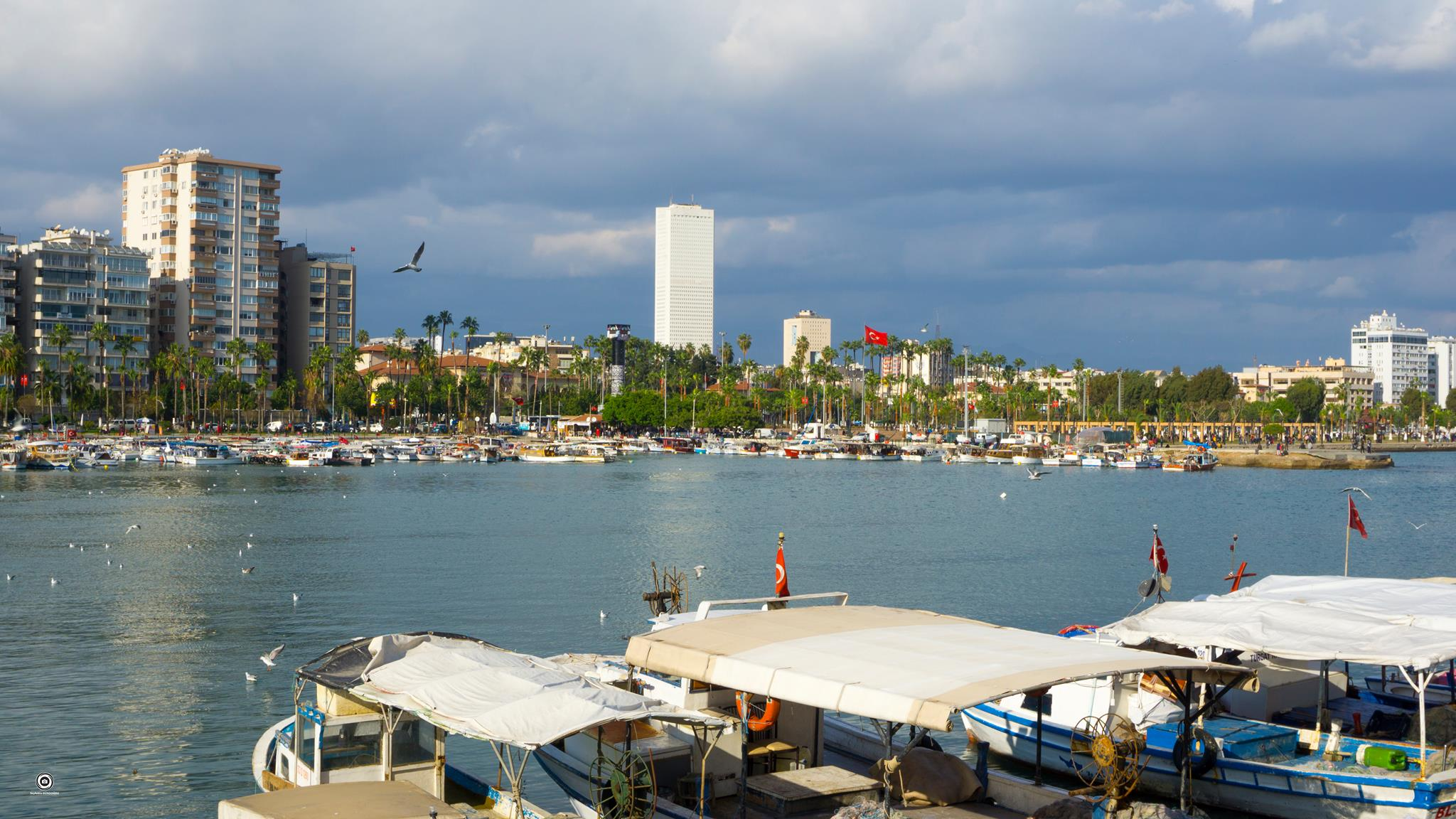
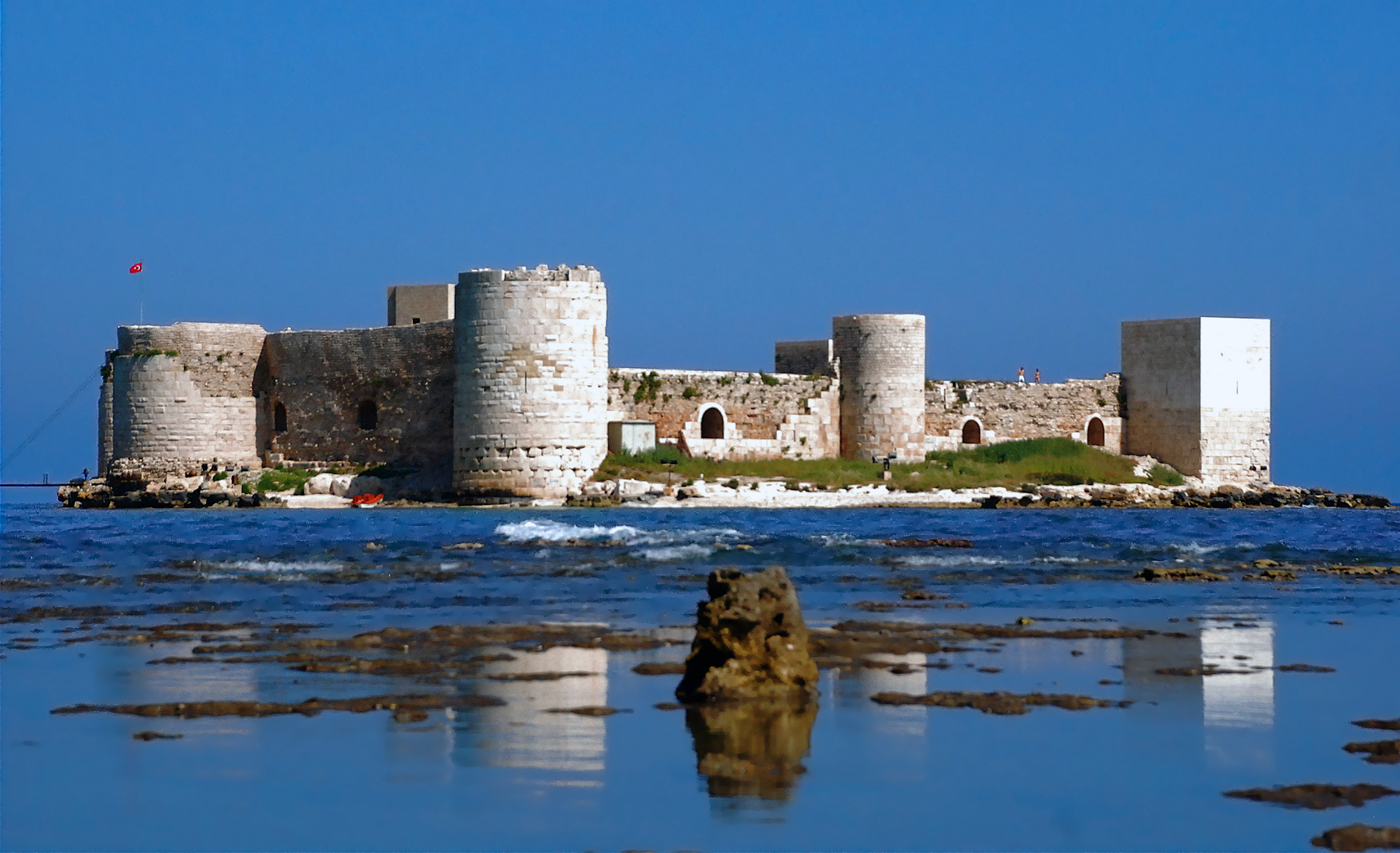
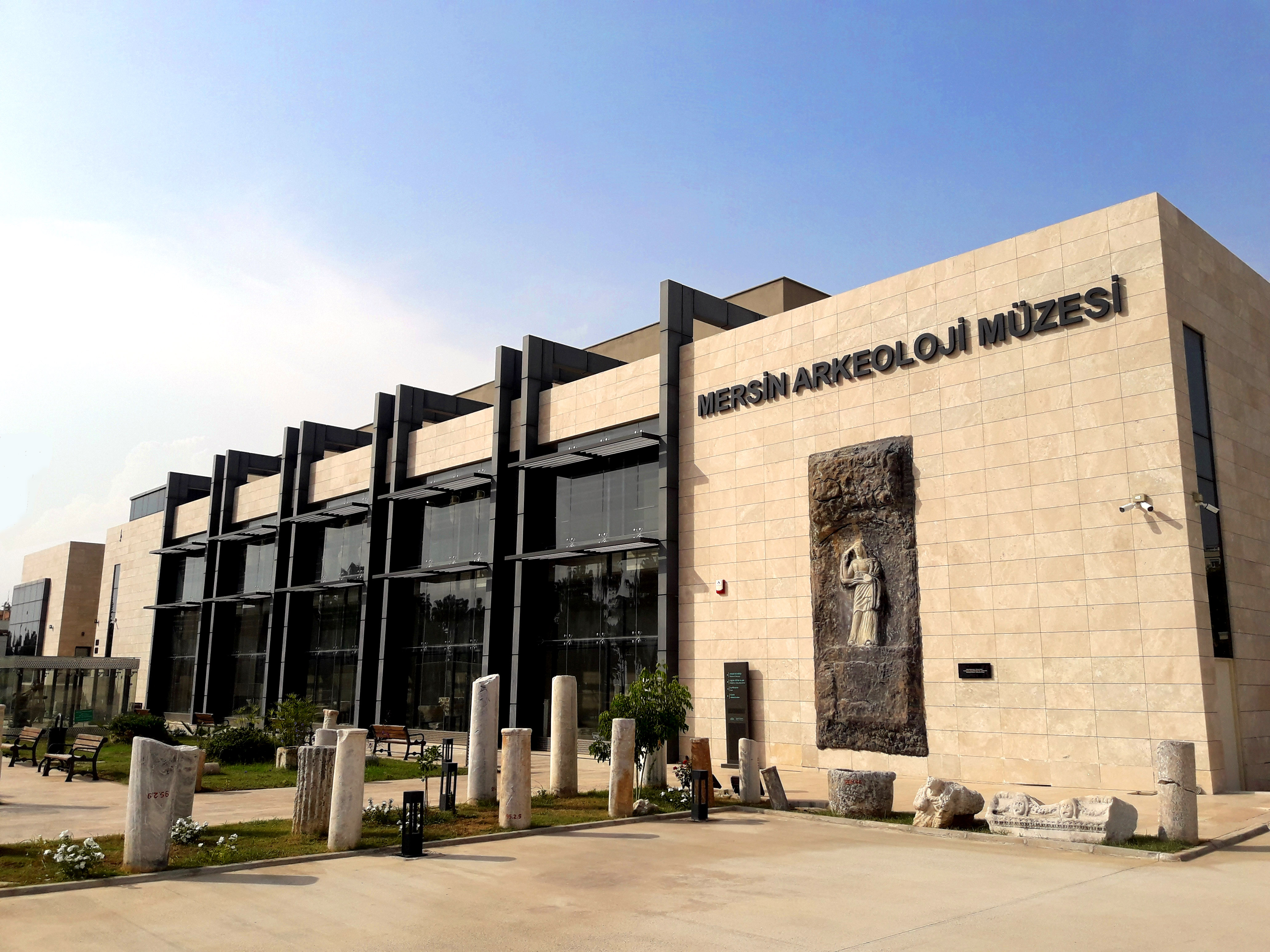
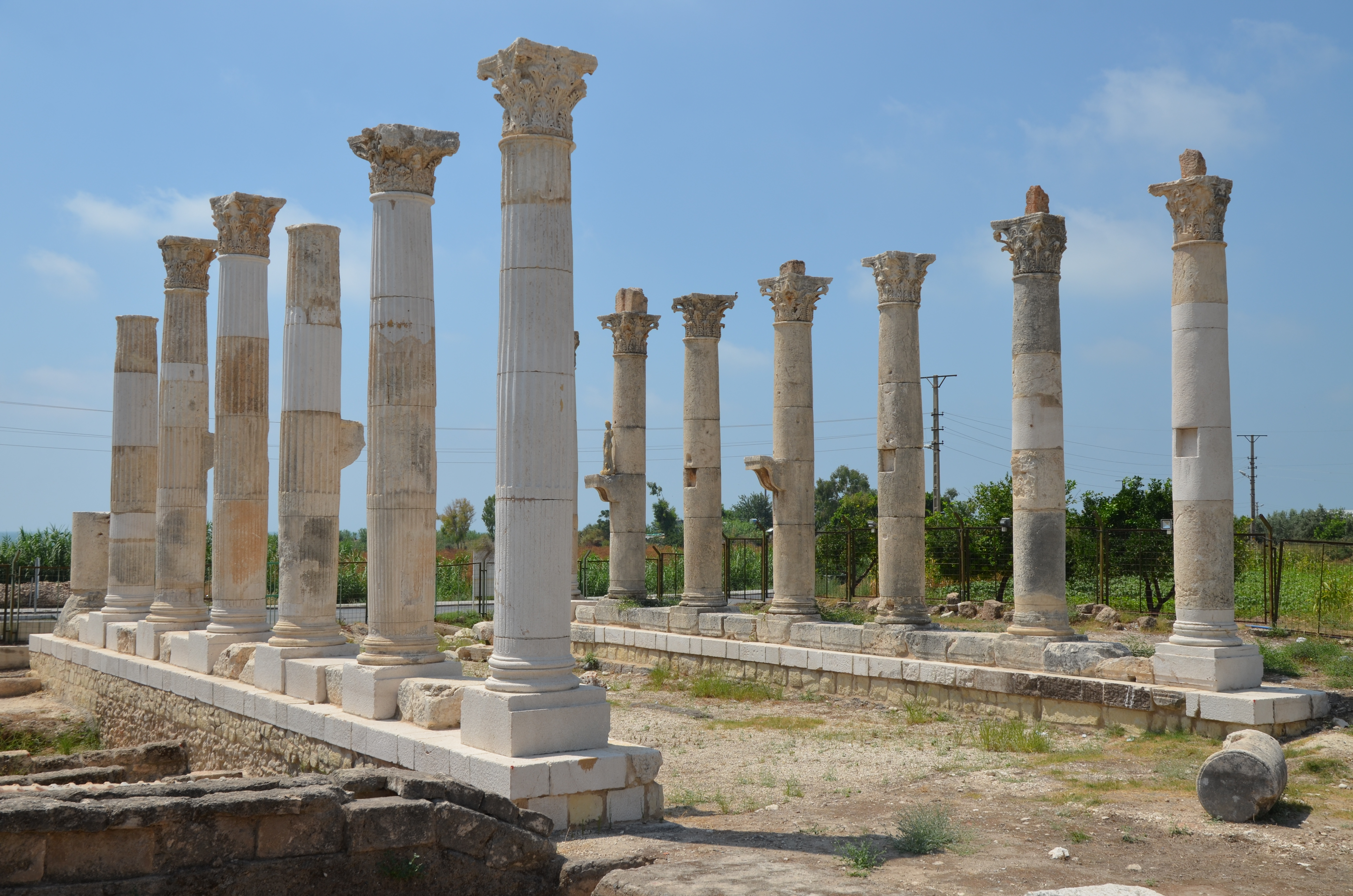
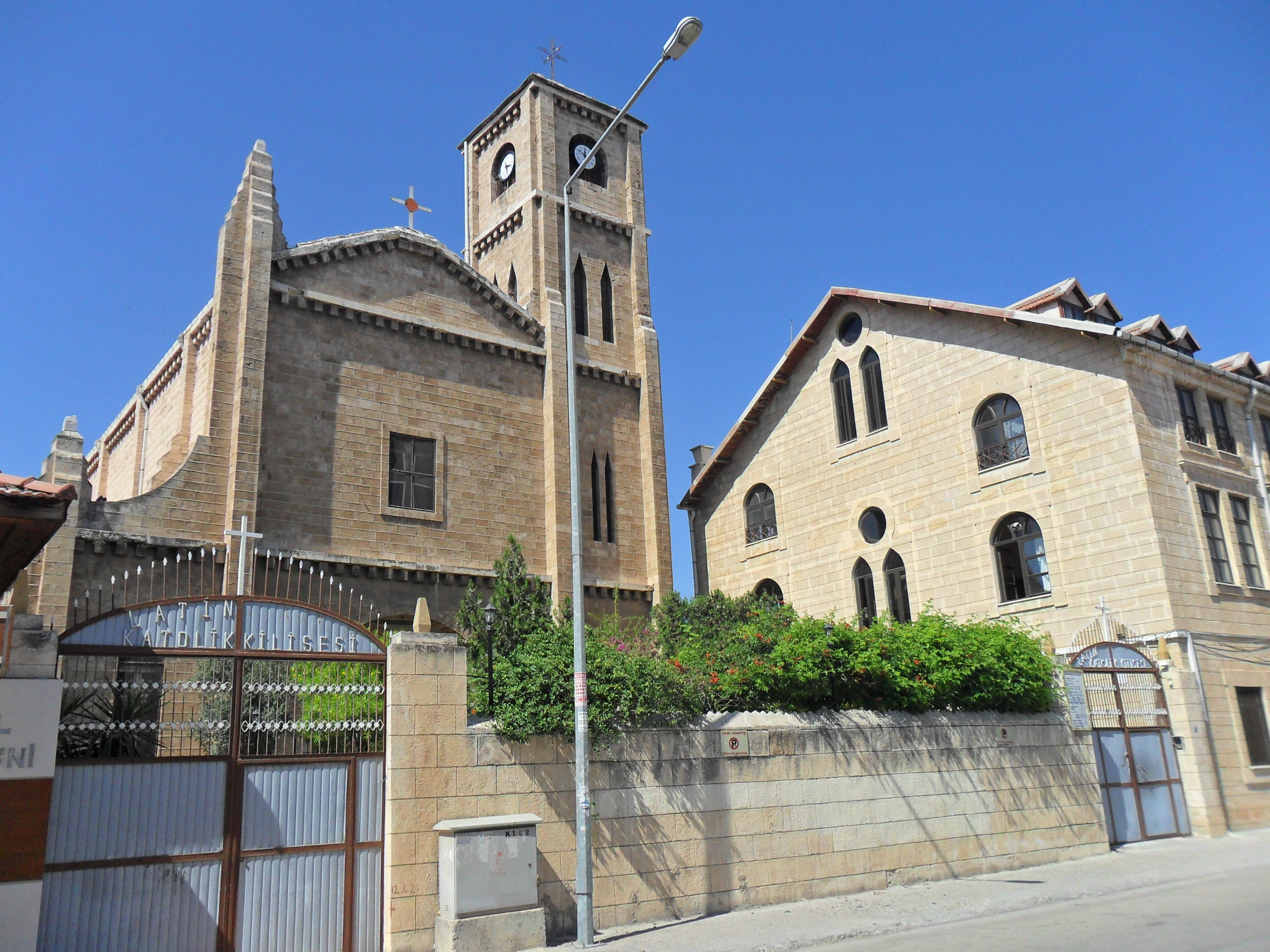
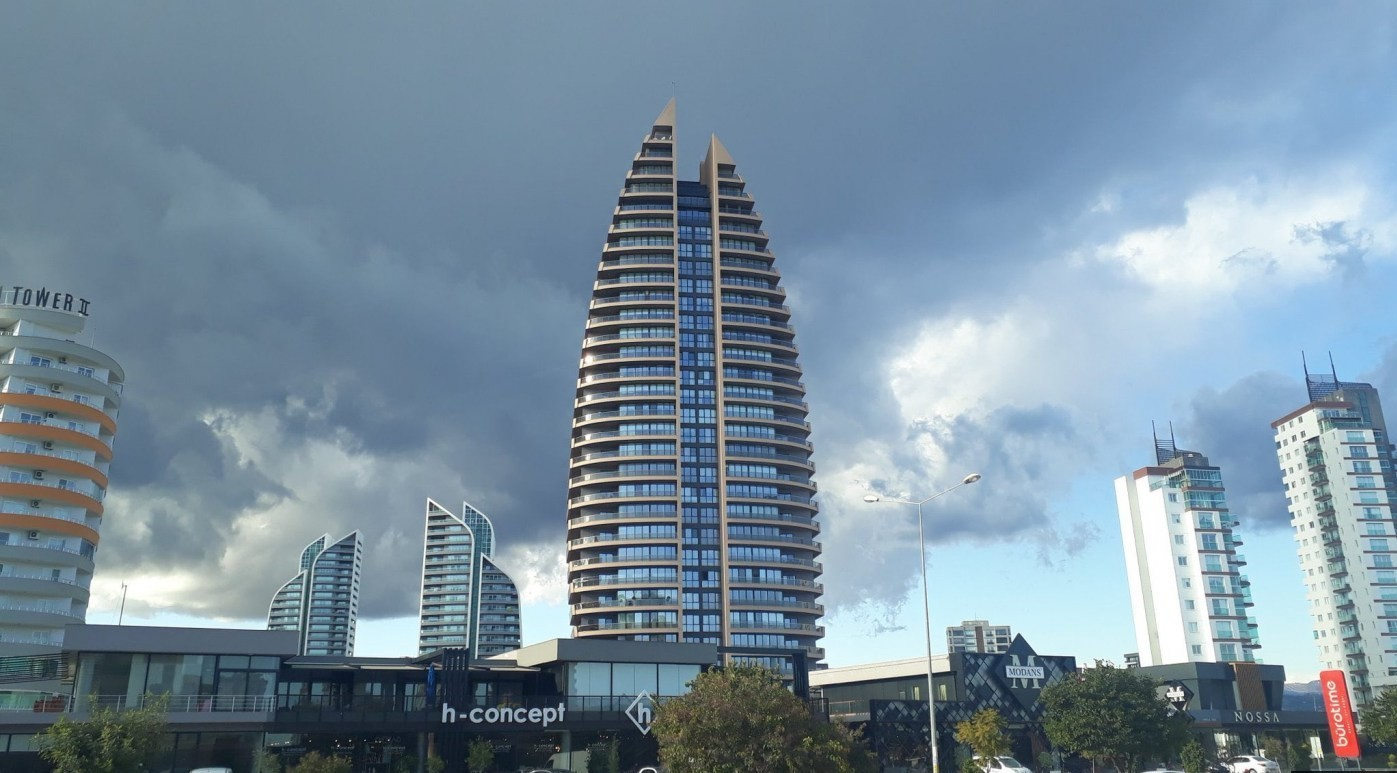
- Clockwise from top: Mertim Tower and the promenade on the Mediterranean coast, Mersin Archaeological Museum, St. Anthony Latin Catholic Church of Mersin, Yenişehir, Soli Pompeiopolis, Kızkalesi

- Emblem of Mersin Metropolitan Municipality

- Location within Turkey Location within Mediterranean
- Coordinates: 36°47′40″N 34°37′38″E
- Country: Turkey
- Region: Mediterranean
- Province: Mersin
- Districts: Akdeniz, Mezitli, Toroslar, Yenişehir

Government
  - Mayor: Vahap Seçer (CHP)

Area
  - Urban: 1,708.6 km^{2} (659.7 sq mi)
- Elevation: 10 m (33 ft)

Population (2024)
  - City and metropolitan municipality: 1 954 279 (province)
  - Urban: 1,084,789
  - Urban density: 634.90/km^{2} (1,644.4/sq mi)
- Time zone: UTC+3 (TRT)
- Postal code: 33XXX
- Area code: (+90) 324 Metropolitan Municipality
- Licence plate: 33
- Website: Mersin

Mersin (pronounced [ˈmæɾsin]) is a large city and port on the Mediterranean coast of southern Turkey. It is the provincial capital of the Mersin Province (formerly İçel). It is made up of four district governorates, each having its own municipality: Akdeniz, Mezitli, Toroslar and Yenişehir.

A larger metropolitan region which combines Mersin with Tarsus and Erdemli houses more than 1.7 million inhabitants. (Note: including residents and Syrian refugees in temporary protection status) Çukurova International Airport (COV) situated 50 kilometres (31 miles) from Mersin city centre, is its closest international airport. There are ferry services from Mersin to Famagusta (Mağusa) in Northern Cyprus. Mersin is linked to Adana via Tarsus by way of TCDD trains.

== Etymology ==
The city was named after the aromatic plant genus Myrsine (Turkish: Mersin, Greek: Μυρσίνη) in the family Primulaceae, a myrtle that grows in abundance in the area. The 17th-century Ottoman traveler Evliya Çelebi also recorded in his Seyahatnâme that there was a clan named the Mersinoğulları (Sons of Mersin) living in the area. In the 19th century Mersin was also referred to as Mersina.

== History ==
=== Prehistory ===
This coast has been inhabited since the 9th millennium BC. Excavations by John Garstang of the hill of Yumuktepe have revealed 23 levels of occupation, the earliest dating from ca. 6300 BC. Fortifications were put up around 4500 BC, but the site appears to have been abandoned between 350 BC and 300 BC.

=== Classical, Hellenistic and Roman Eras ===
Over the centuries, the city was ruled by many states and civilisations including the Hittites, Assyrians, Urartians, Persians, Greeks, Armenians, Seleucids and Lagids. During the Ancient Greek period, the city bore the name Zephyrion (Greek: Ζεφύριον) and was mentioned by numerous ancient authors. Apart from its natural harbour and strategic position along the trade routes of southern Anatolia, the city profited from trade in molybdenum (white lead) from the neighbouring mines of Coreyra. Ancient sources attributed the best molybdenum to the city, which also minted its own coins.

During the Wars of the Diadochi, Ptolemy I Soter established himself there with a fleet while attempting to weaken Eumenes by sending messages to the commanders of the Silver Shields and the officers guarding the royal treasury at Cyinda, urging them not to support Eumenes.

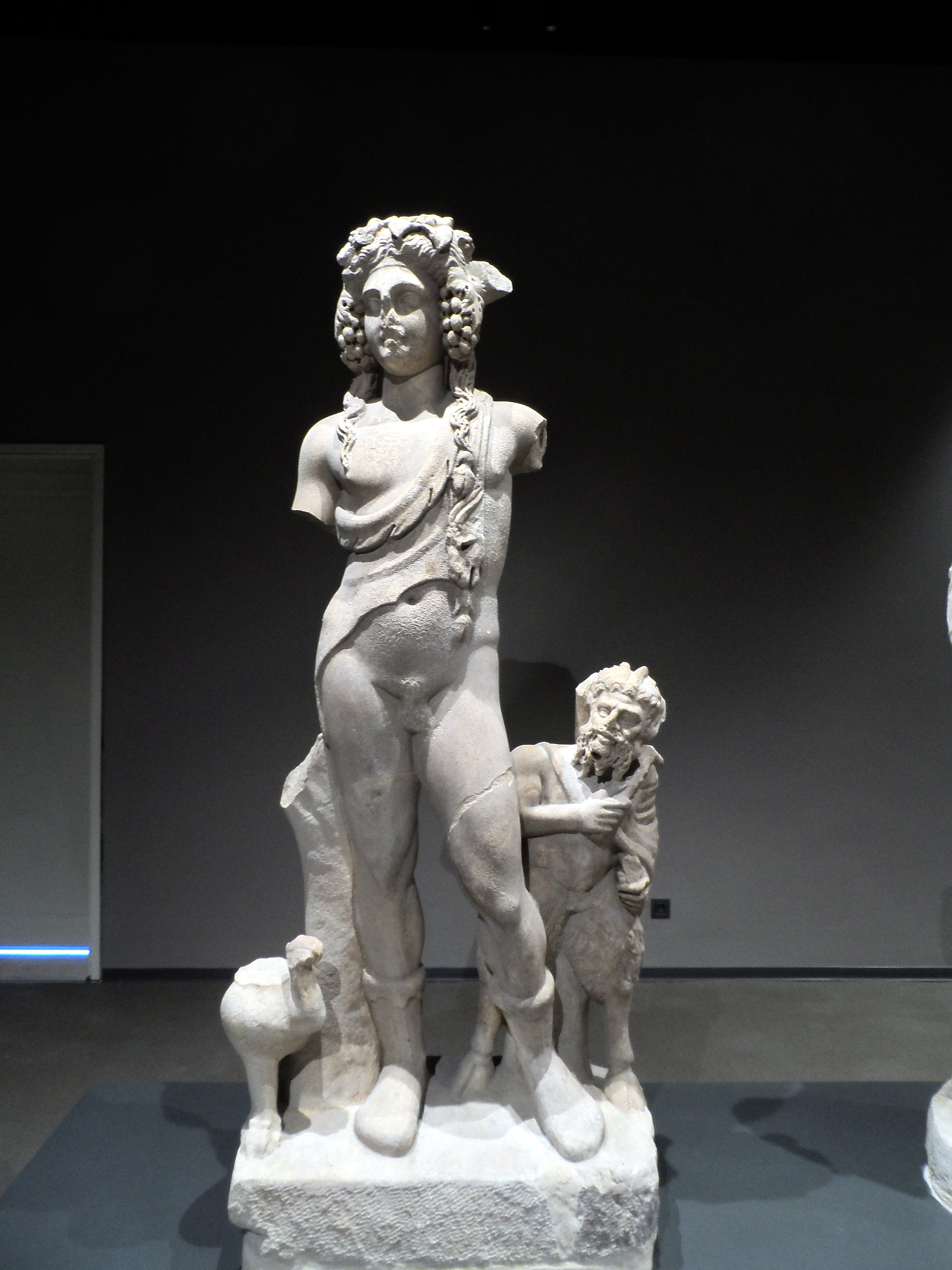
Hellenistic sculpture in Mersin Archaeological Museum

The area later became a part of the Roman province of Cilicia, which had its capital at Tarsus, while nearby Mersin was the major port. The city, whose name was Latinised to Zephyrium, was renamed as Hadrianopolis in honour of the Roman emperor Hadrian. After the death of the emperor Theodosius I in 395 and the subsequent permanent division of the Roman Empire, Mersin fell into what became the Byzantine Empire.

The city was an episcopal see under the Patriarchate of Antioch. Le Quien names four bishops of Zephyrium: Aerius, present at the First Council of Constantinople in 381; Zenobius, a Nestorian, the writer of a letter protesting the removal of Bishop Meletius of Mopsuestia by Patriarch John of Antioch (429–441); Hypatius, present at the Council of Chalcedon in 451; and Peter, present at the Council in Trullo in 692. The bishopric is included in the Catholic Church's list of titular sees, but since the Second Vatican Council no new titular bishop of this Eastern see has been appointed.

=== Medieval period ===
Cilicia was conquered by the Arabs in the early 7th century, by which time it appears Mersin was a deserted site. The Arabs were followed by the Egyptian Tulunids, then by the Byzantines between 965 and c.1080 and then by the Armenian Kingdom of Cilicia. Under Armenian Cilicia, the region of Mersin served as the powerbase for the House of Lampron. From 1362 to 1513 the region was captured and governed by the Ramadanid Emirate, first as a protectorate of the Mamluk Sultanate, then as an independent state for roughly a century and then as a protectorate of the Ottoman Empire from 1513 until 1518 when it was annexed into the Ottoman Empire and turned into an imperial province.

=== Ottoman Empire ===
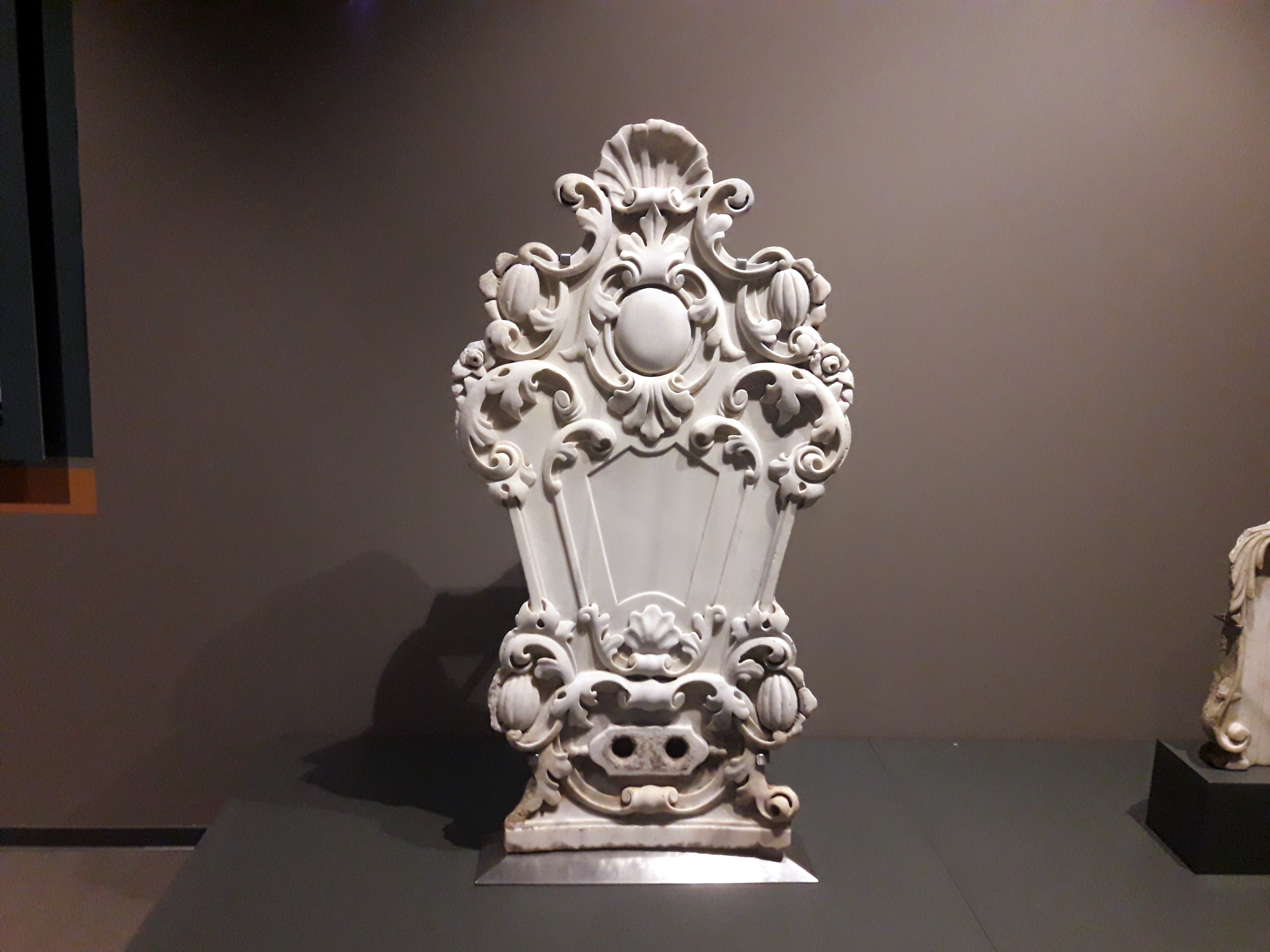
From Mersin Archaeological Museum

Ottoman incorporation of Mersin occurred in 1517 when Sultan Selim I defeated the Mamluks and annexed Cilicia, organizing the area under the Adana Eyalet with the Ramadanid beys retaining hereditary administration until 1608. Mersin at this time was a modest coastal village. The city's geographical position on the Mediterranean coast made it the natural gateway to the sea for the entire Cilicia region, though it remained relatively undeveloped for much of the Ottoman period. At the beginning of the 19th century, Mersin was still a small village, with the Christian population of the region concentrated in nearby Tarsus. It was only towards the mid-19th century that Mersin began to flourish as a port serving the Çukurova region.

During the American Civil War, the region became a major supplier of cotton to make up for the high demand due to shortage. Railroads were extended in 1866 to link the cotton-growing areas with Mersin, enabling export by sea, and the city developed into a major trade centre. In 1909, Mersin's port hosted 645 steamships and 797,433 tons of goods. Before World War I, Mersin exported mainly sesame seeds, cotton, cottonseed, cakes and cereals, and livestock. Cotton was exported to Europe, grain to other areas in Turkey, and livestock to Egypt. Mersin's main import at the time was coal. Messageries Maritimes was the largest shipping line to use the port.

In 1918, the Ottoman Empire collapsed and Mersin was occupied by French and British troops in accordance with the Treaty of Sèvres. It was recovered by the Turkish Army in 1921 at the end of the Franco-Turkish War. In 1924, Mersin was made a province, and in 1933 Mersin and İçel provinces were merged to form a larger İçel Province, with Mersin as its capital. In 2002 the name of that larger İçel Province was changed to Mersin Province.

As of 1920, Mersin had five piers at its port, one of which was privately owned by a railroad company serving Mersin, Tarsus, and Adana.

=== Modern Mersin ===
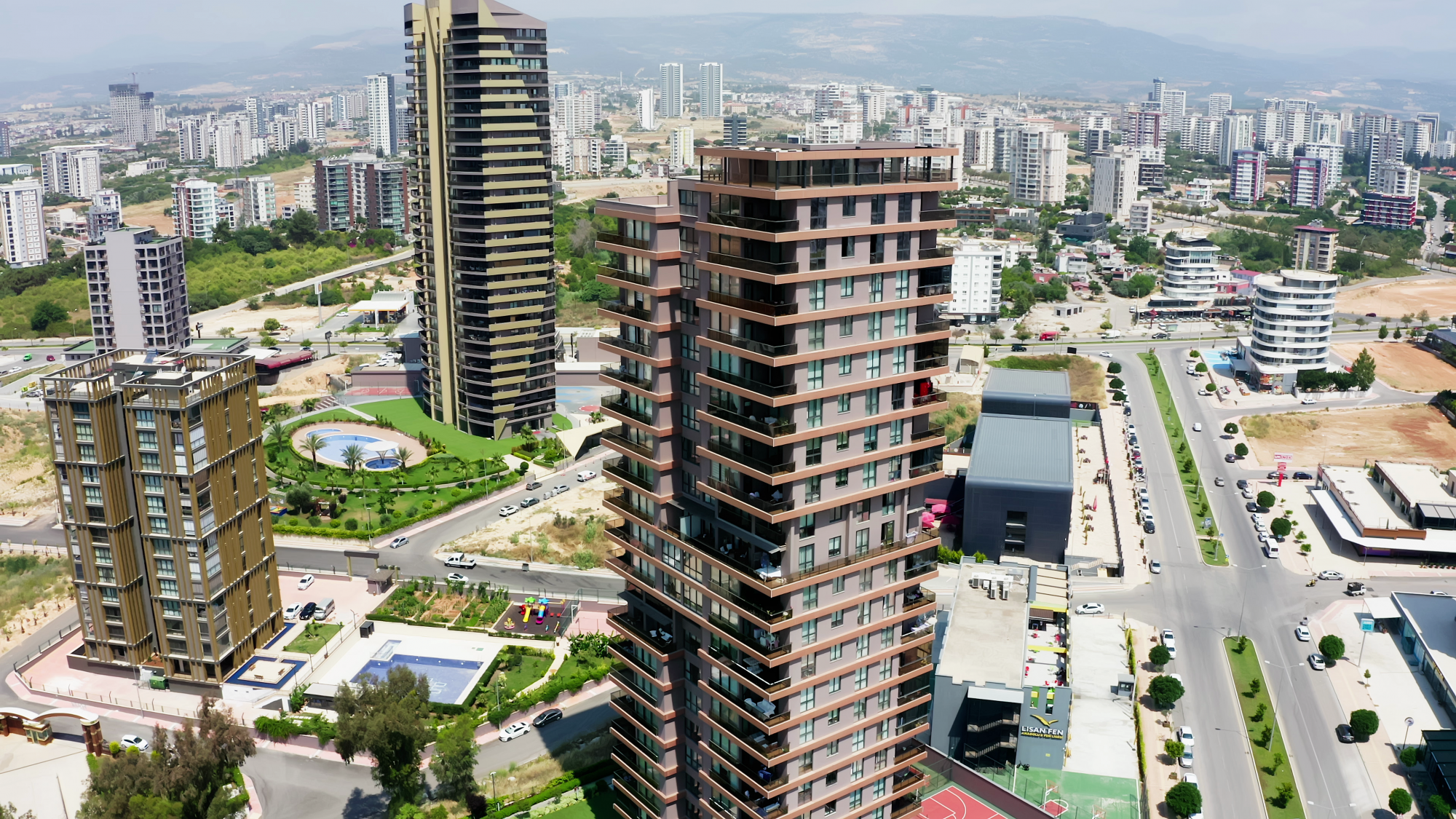
Limonluk neighbourhood

Today, Mersin is a large city spreading out along the coast. It has the longest seashore in Turkey as well as in the Eastern Mediterranean.

The Metropolitan Municipality has rescued long stretches of the seafront with walkways, parks and statues, and there are still palm trees on the roadsides.

Since the start of the Syrian War in 2011 Mersin has acquired a large population of Syrian refugees.

On 6 February 2023 Mersin was shaken by the twin Turkish-Syrian earthquakes. Citizens made homeless in cities further to the east also flocked to Mersin in search of shelter. The urban population of the city is 1,084,789 (Mezitli, Yenisehir, Toroslar, Akdeniz), with a metropolitan population of 1,954,279.

== Local attractions ==
There are six museums within the Mersin urban area; Mersin Archaeological Museum, Mersin Atatürk Museum, Mersin Naval Museum, Mersin State Art and Sculpture Museum, Mersin Urban History Museum, Mersin Water Museum.

In the western suburb of Viranşehir (Ruined City) the remains of the ancient city of Soli/Pompeiiopolis stand close to the sea. Only two colonnades dating from the 2nd or 3rd century are obvious although the outline of the agora and of a mole from the harbour can just about be made out. Mersin lies on the western side of Çukurova, a Turkish economic hub housing Turkey's largest seaport. The city also hosted the 2013 Mediterranean Games.

The Chasms of Heaven and Hell are located in the rural region of Silifke, a district in Mersin. The chasms are two sinkholes that were naturally formed from underground waters melting the layer of limestone above. The heaven sinkhole has a small monastery located in the corner of the entrance. The deepest point of the sinkhole is 135 meters deep. The hell sinkhole is 128 meters deep. In mythology, there is a story of Zeus temporarily trapping Typhon in the sinkhole.

The city has a total of three modern shopping malls, from which the Forum Mersin is the largest one. Mersin Marina can also be considered a shopping center with over 40 shops, apart from its main function as a marina. In the old city center you will find further shopping opportunities and bazaar-like shopping areas.

== Geography ==
Köppen map of Mersin Province and surrounding regions:
- Csa
- Csb
- Dsa
- Dsb
- Dsc

Unlike the mountainous rugged terrain of the whole province Mersin is located at the western edge of the Çukurova plain. Earthquake risk of the city is relatively low especially compared to other regions of Turkey, but due to its closeness to several other fault lines in Anatolia, the city center, which was built on an alluvial deposit is considered to be a risk region.

=== Climate ===
Mersin has a hot-summer Mediterranean climate (Köppen climate classification: Csa, Trewartha climate classification: Cs), a type of subtropical climate with hot, humid summers and mild, wet winters. Mersin has its highest rainfall in winter. The driest months are in summer with hardly any rainfall at all. The highest temperature of Mersin was recorded on 3 September 2020 at 41.5 °C (106.7 °F), and the lowest was recorded on 6 February 1950 at −6.6 °C (20.1 °F).

Climate data for Mersin (1991–2020, extremes 1940–2025)
Month	Jan	Feb	Mar	Apr	May	Jun	Jul	Aug	Sep	Oct	Nov	Dec	Year
Record high °C (°F)	25.2 (77.4)	26.5 (79.7)	30.8 (87.4)	34.7 (94.5)	36.0 (96.8)	40.0 (104.0)	38.1 (100.6)	39.8 (103.6)	41.5 (106.7)	37.5 (99.5)	31.0 (87.8)	27.0 (80.6)	41.5 (106.7)
Mean daily maximum °C (°F)	15.2 (59.4)	16.2 (61.2)	19.0 (66.2)	22.2 (72.0)	25.8 (78.4)	29.1 (84.4)	31.9 (89.4)	32.8 (91.0)	31.1 (88.0)	27.9 (82.2)	22.1 (71.8)	16.9 (62.4)	24.2 (75.6)
Daily mean °C (°F)	11.0 (51.8)	12.0 (53.6)	14.9 (58.8)	18.2 (64.8)	22.1 (71.8)	25.8 (78.4)	28.7 (83.7)	29.3 (84.7)	27.0 (80.6)	23.0 (73.4)	17.2 (63.0)	12.6 (54.7)	20.1 (68.2)
Mean daily minimum °C (°F)	7.6 (45.7)	8.2 (46.8)	10.9 (51.6)	14.4 (57.9)	18.6 (65.5)	22.6 (72.7)	25.8 (78.4)	26.3 (79.3)	23.2 (73.8)	18.6 (65.5)	13.0 (55.4)	9.1 (48.4)	16.5 (61.7)
Record low °C (°F)	−6.3 (20.7)	−6.6 (20.1)	−2.2 (28.0)	0.6 (33.1)	7.0 (44.6)	12.0 (53.6)	16.1 (61.0)	15.0 (59.0)	11.0 (51.8)	2.7 (36.9)	−3.3 (26.1)	−3.0 (26.6)	−6.6 (20.1)
Average precipitation mm (inches)	115.9 (4.56)	79.0 (3.11)	56.1 (2.21)	34.6 (1.36)	26.7 (1.05)	12.0 (0.47)	9.3 (0.37)	7.3 (0.29)	13.4 (0.53)	35.7 (1.41)	80.2 (3.16)	162.7 (6.41)	632.9 (24.92)
Average rainy days	10.07	9.07	7.37	7.27	6.07	2.70	1.00	1.03	2.13	5.27	6.37	10.83	69.2
Average snowy days	0	0.19	0	0	0	0	0	0	0	0	0	0.06	0.25
Average relative humidity (%)	62.5	62.5	63.6	66.7	69.3	71.2	72.1	69.7	63.2	57.6	56.7	61.9	64.8
Mean monthly sunshine hours	148.8	158.2	209.5	229.2	263.2	294.7	311.7	304.6	272.2	235.1	175.2	137.9	2,736.1
Mean daily sunshine hours	4.8	5.6	6.8	7.7	8.5	9.8	10.1	9.8	9.1	7.6	5.9	4.6	7.5
Source 1: Turkish State Meteorological Service
Source 2: NOAA (humidity, sun 1991–2020), Meteomanz(snow days 2008–2023)

== Demographics ==
The population of the city was 1,040,507 according to 2022 estimates. This figure refers to the urban part of the four districts Akdeniz, Mezitli, Toroslar and Yenişehir, that had a total population of 1,077,054 at the end of 2022. As of a 2021 estimation, the population of the Adana-Mersin Metropolitan Area was 3,300,000 inhabitants, making it the 4th most populous area of Turkey.

=== Religion ===
The Mersin Interfaith Cemetery, in the Yusuf Kılıç district, serves as a cemetery for all religions with graves of Muslims, Christians and Jews.

According to church estimates, the total number of Christians in Mersin is around 3,000. Of these, roughly 1,500 belong to the Orthodox Church and about 1,300 are Catholics, while a small remainder consists of Armenians and Christians of Levantine origin.

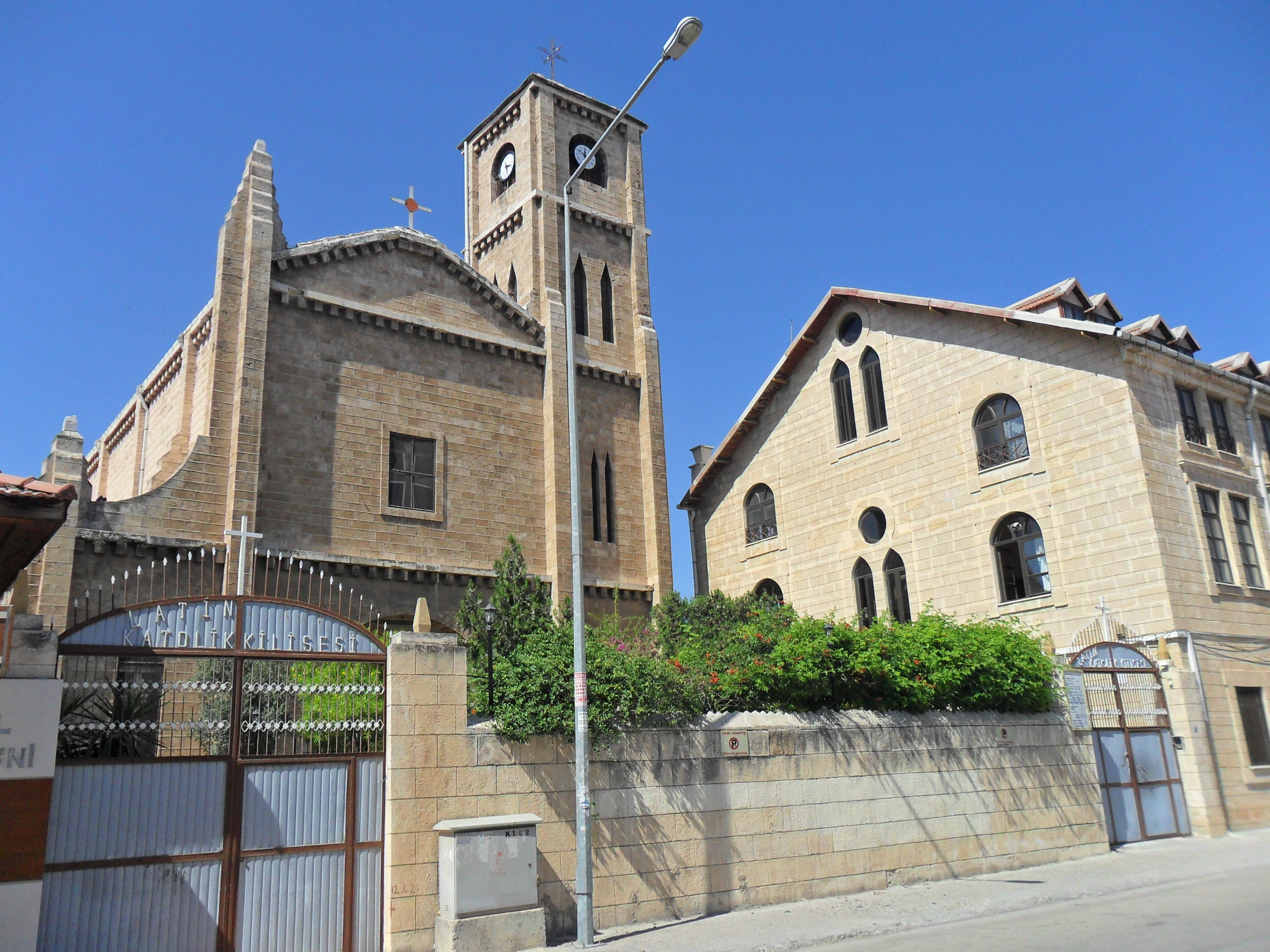
Cathedral of St. Anthony of Padua

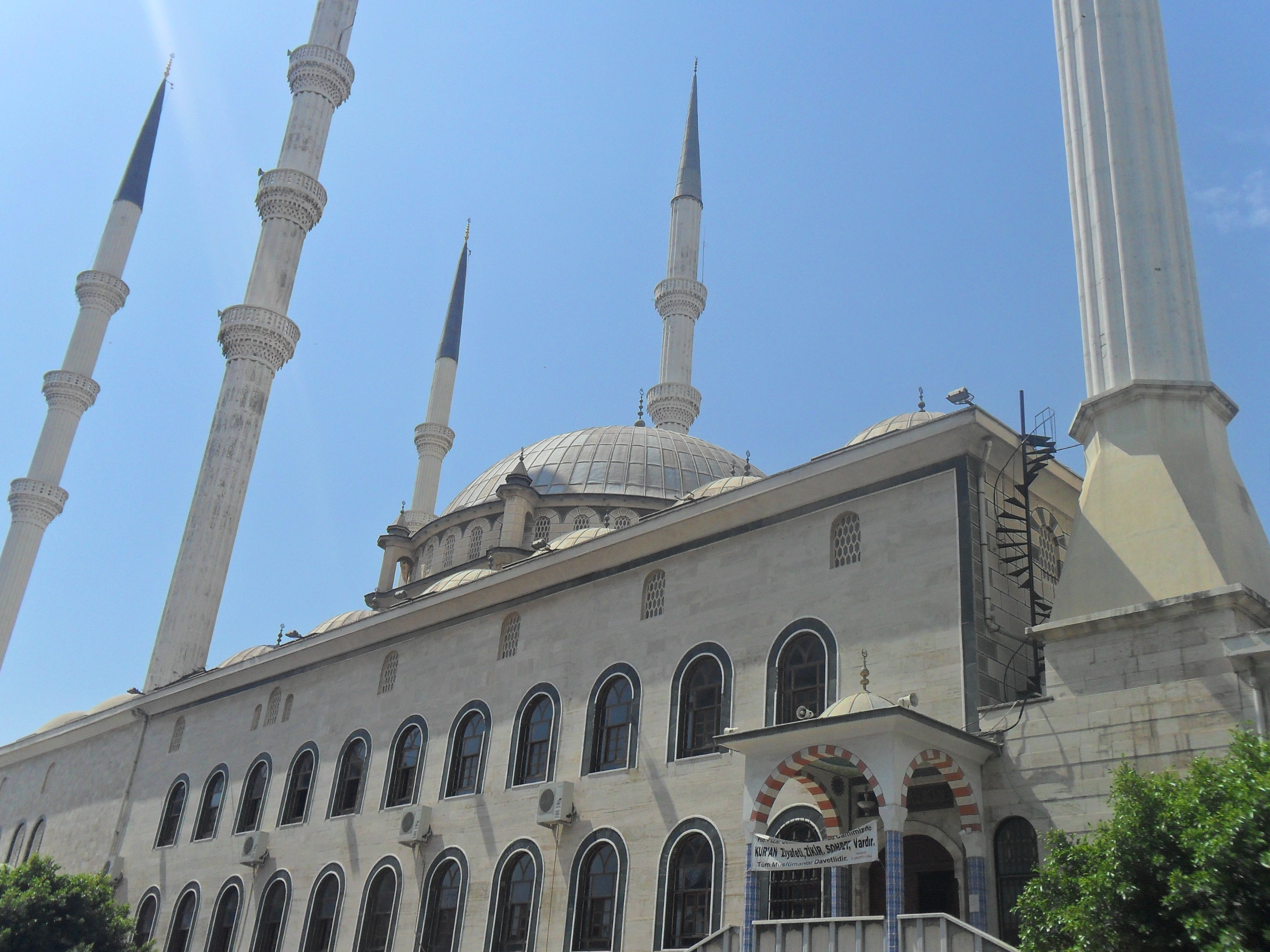
Muğdat Mosque in Yenişehir was built in the 1980s

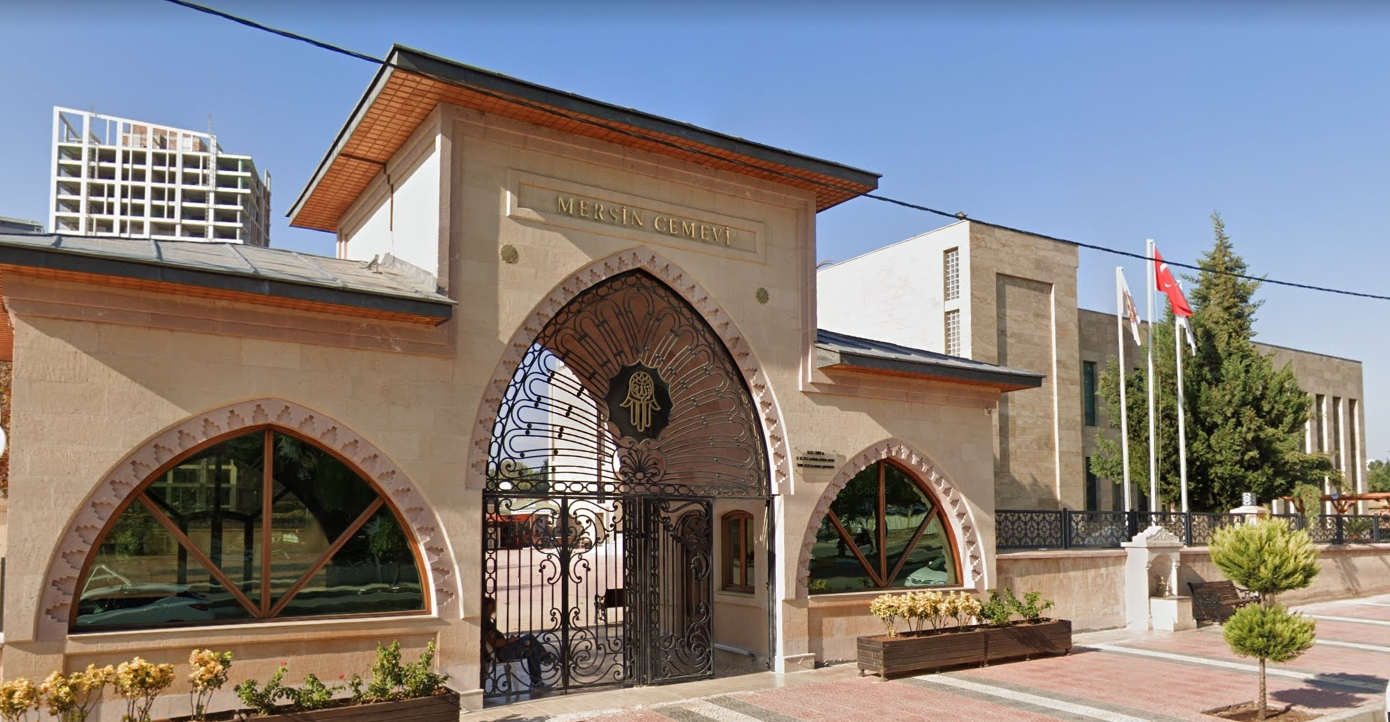
Mersin Cemevi, an Alevi place of worship

== Economy and transportation ==
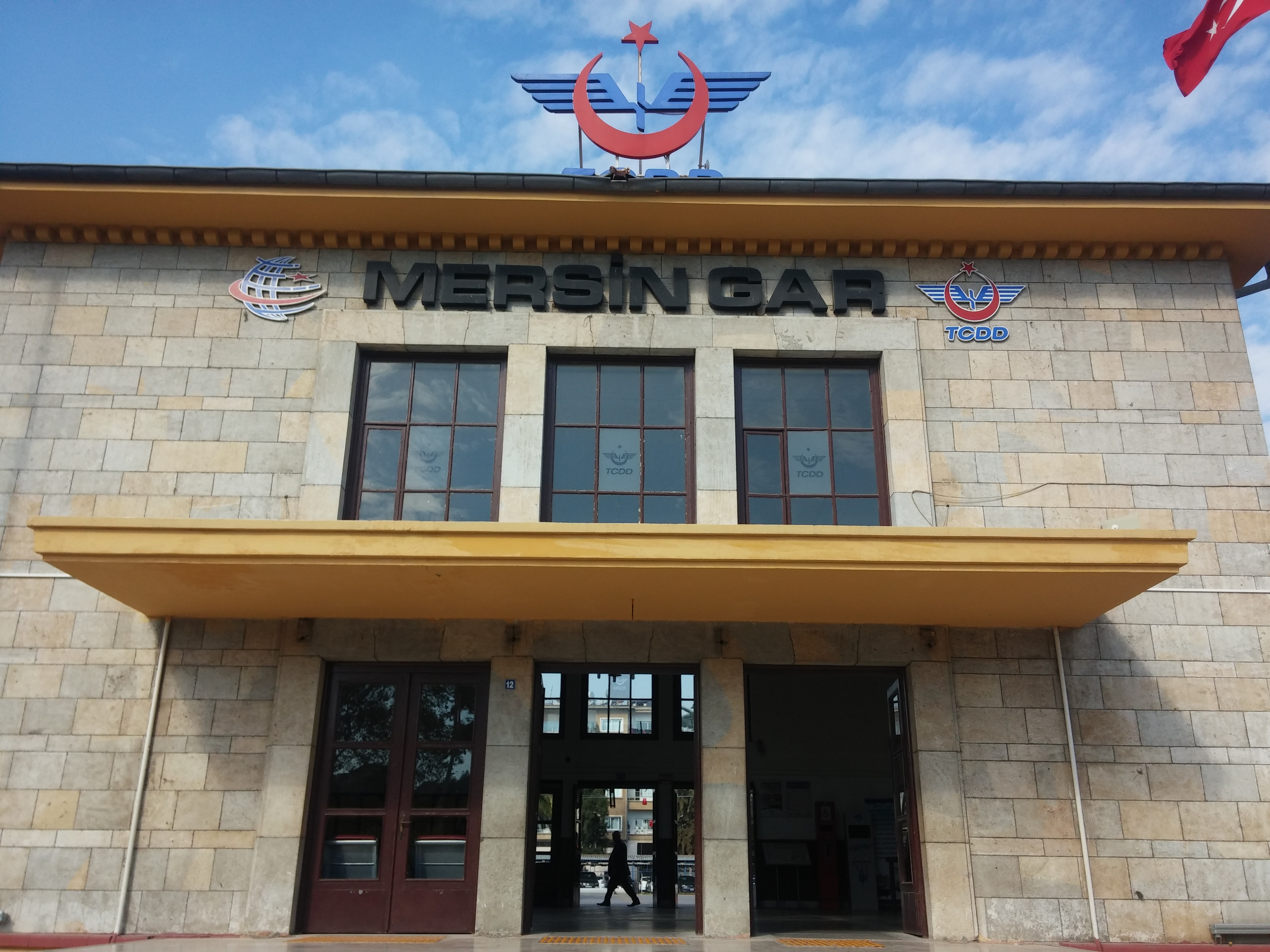
Mersin Train Station

The Port of Mersin is an international hub for vessels routed to European countries, with a capacity of 6,000 ships per year.

Next to the port is the Mersin Free Zone, established in 1986 as the first free zone in Turkey. The zone is a publicly owned centre for foreign investors, close to major markets in the Middle East, North Africa, Europe, Russia and Central Asia. In 2002 the free zone's trading volume was US$51.8 billion.

Historically, Mersin was a major producer of cottonseed oil. The area around Mersin is renowned for its citrus and cotton production. Additionally, bananas, olives and other assorted fruits are also produced.

Mersin has highway connections to the North, East and West. It is also connected to the Southern railroad. Mersin railway station in the district of Akdeniz has been in use since 1886. Opened on 28 February 2015, Mersin Bus Terminus is the terminus for intercity bus services, replacing the bus station that had been in the city centre since 1986. A metro system with 11 stations and a length of 13.4 kilometres (8.3 mi) is scheduled for opening at the end of 2026.

Since August 2024, transport by air is facilitated by the Çukurova International Airport.

Work is underway to complete the Akkuyu Nuclear Power Plant, Turkey's first nuclear power plant, some 80 miles west of Mersin. Environmental groups, such as Greenpeace, have opposed the construction.

== Culture ==
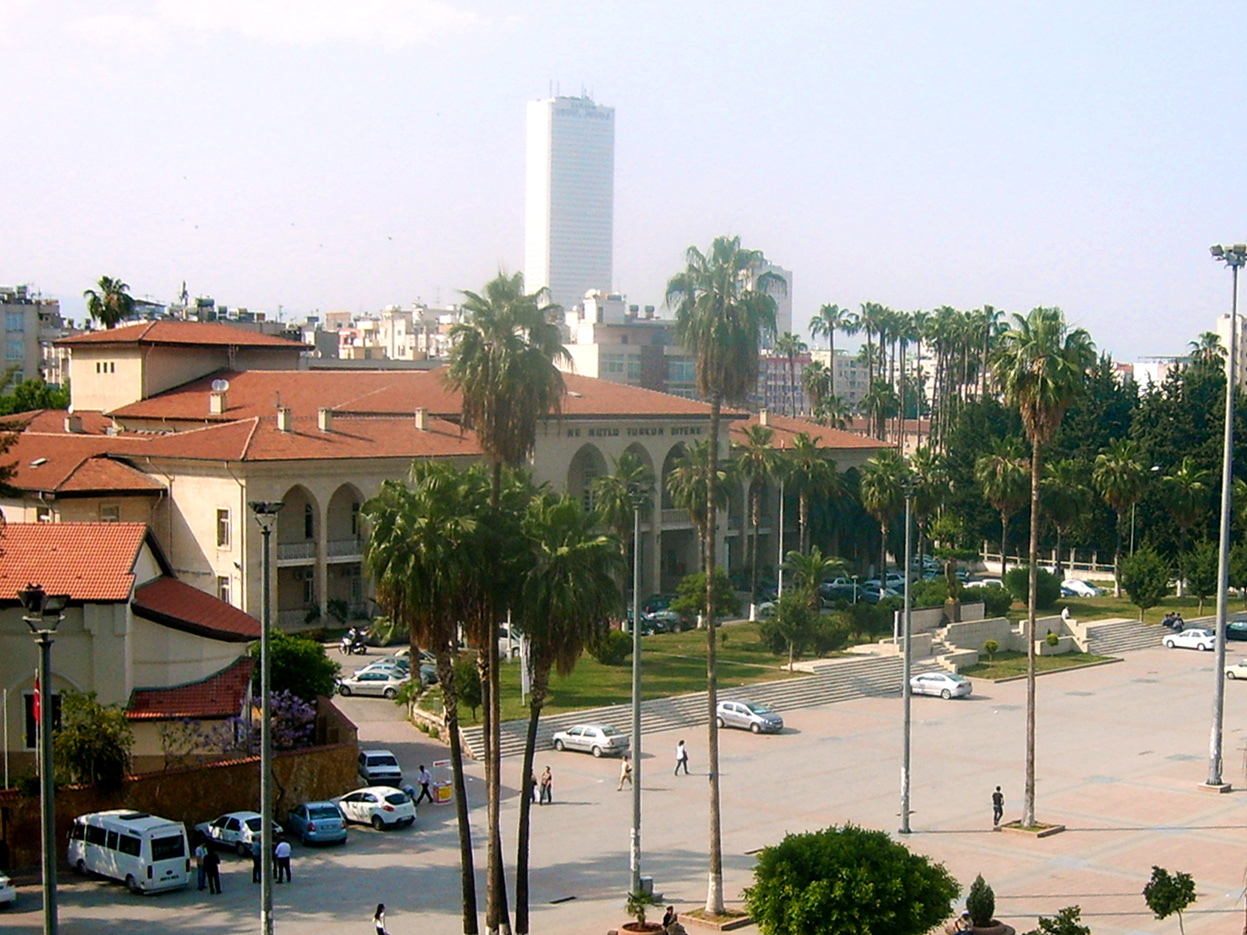
Mersin Opera and Ballet House

Mersin is home to a State Opera and ballet, the fourth in Turkey after Istanbul, İzmir and Ankara. Mersin International Music Festival was established in 2001 and takes place every October.

The photography associations Mersin Fotoğraf Derneği (MFD) and Mersin Olba Fotoğraf Derneği (MOF) are amongst the city's most popular and active cultural organisations. Some cultural activities are sponsored by the İçel sanat kulübü (Art Club of Mersin) and Mediterranean Opera and Ballet Club.

The Mersin Citrus Festival is a festival organized to promote the citrus produced in Mersin. The festival typically includes folk dancers from different traditions and sculptures constructed from different types of citrus. The first festival was held in 2010. The festival is held annually on a weekend in November.

=== Cuisine ===
Mersin is best known in Turkey for its tantuni, and restaurants serving it can be found all over the country. The provincial cuisine includes specialties such as:

- Ciğer kebap, (liver on mangal), typically served on lavaş with an assortment of meze at 12 skewers at a time,
- Tantuni, a hot lavaş wrap consisting of julienned lamb stir-fried on a sac on a hint of cottonseed oil,
- Bumbar or mumbar, lamb intestines filled with a mixture of rice, meat and pistachios, that are served either grilled or steamed, famous throughout the Levant ,
- Cezerye, a lokum-like delight made of caramelized carrot paste, covered in (sometimes sliced) pistachios and often also sprinkled with ground coconut,
- Karsambaç, a variety of shaved ice served with pekmez or honey as toppings,
- Künefe, a wood-oven baked dessert based on a mixture of cheese and pastry; known all throughout the Levant,
- Kerebiç, a shortbread filled with pistachio paste, also famous throughout the Levant,
- Şalgam suyu, a beverage made of fermented red carrots, very popular in Southern Turkey.

=== Media ===
Local TV channels

- Kanal 33
- İçel TV
- Sun RTV
- Güney TV

Local radio channels

- Radyo Metropol (101.8)
- Tarsus Süper FM (91.1)
- Tempo 94 FM (94.3)
- Örgün FM (94.7)
- Tarsus Star FM (95.5)
- Tarsus Radyo Time (97.7)
- Flaş FM (98.3)
- Mix FM (91.6) (sadece yabancı müzik, 1993-günümüz)
- Kent Radyo (98.5)

== Sports ==
The city was formerly home to Mersin İdman Yurdu, a football club that played in the Süper Lig as recently as the 2015–16 season. The men's basketball team of the Mersin Büyükşehir Belediyesi S.K. plays in the Turkish Basketball League while its women's basketball team plays in the Turkish Women's Basketball League.

The city has one football stadium, Mersin Arena, with a seating capacity of 25,534. There was another stadium, Tevfik Sırrı Gür Stadium, which had a capacity of 10,128 and is now demolished and turned into a park. The men's and women's basketball teams of the Mersin Büyükşehir Belediyesi S.K. play their home matches at the Edip Buran Sport Hall, which has a seating capacity of 2,700.

Eleven new sports venues were built for Mersin to host the 2013 Mediterranean Games. The Servet Tazegül Arena, the fourth biggest indoor arena of Turkey with its 7,500 seating capacity, hosted the men's basketball events and the volleyball finals of the Games. The athletics and paralympic athletics events were held at the Nevin Yanıt Athletics Complex.

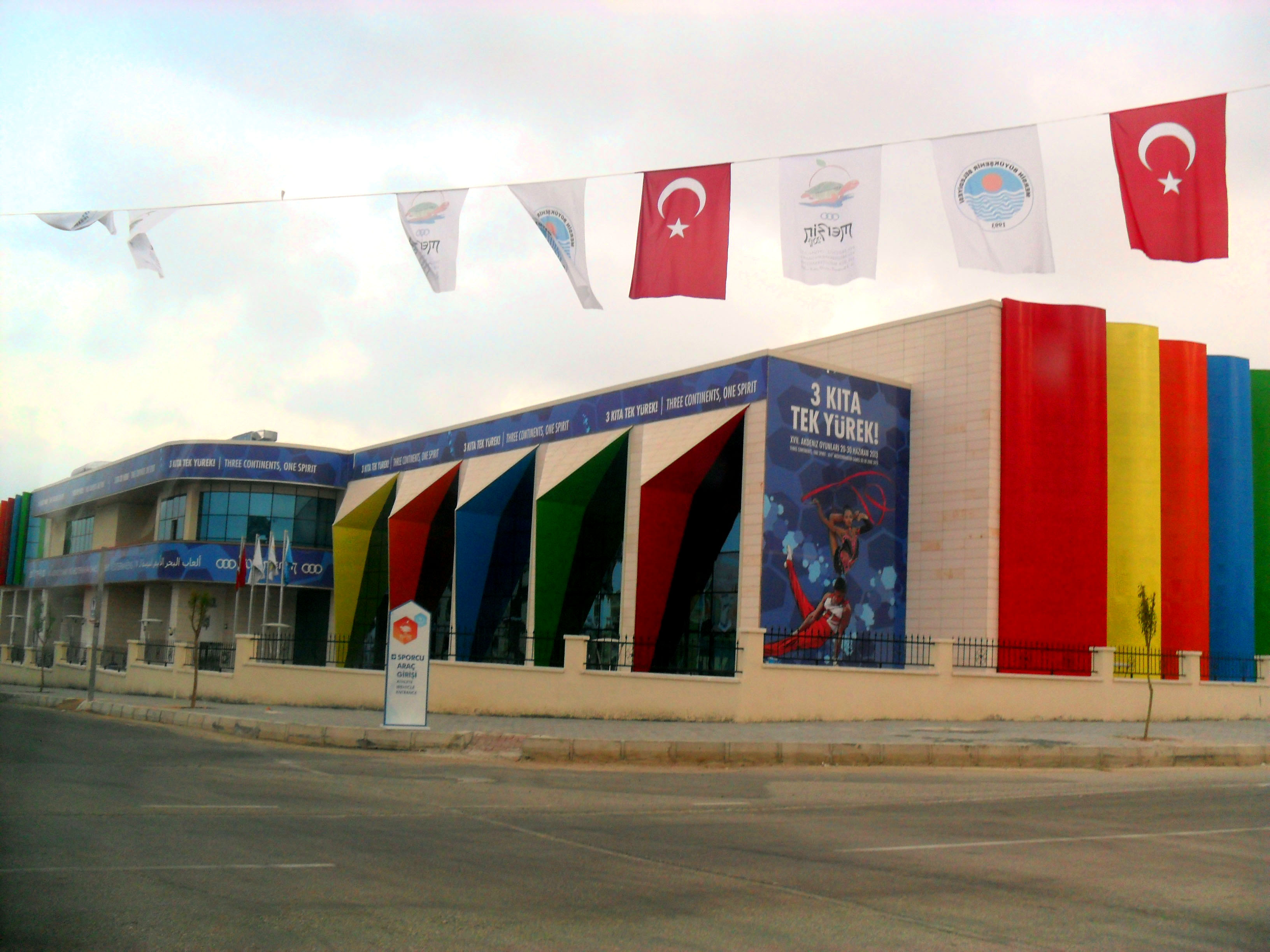
Mersin Gymnastics Hall

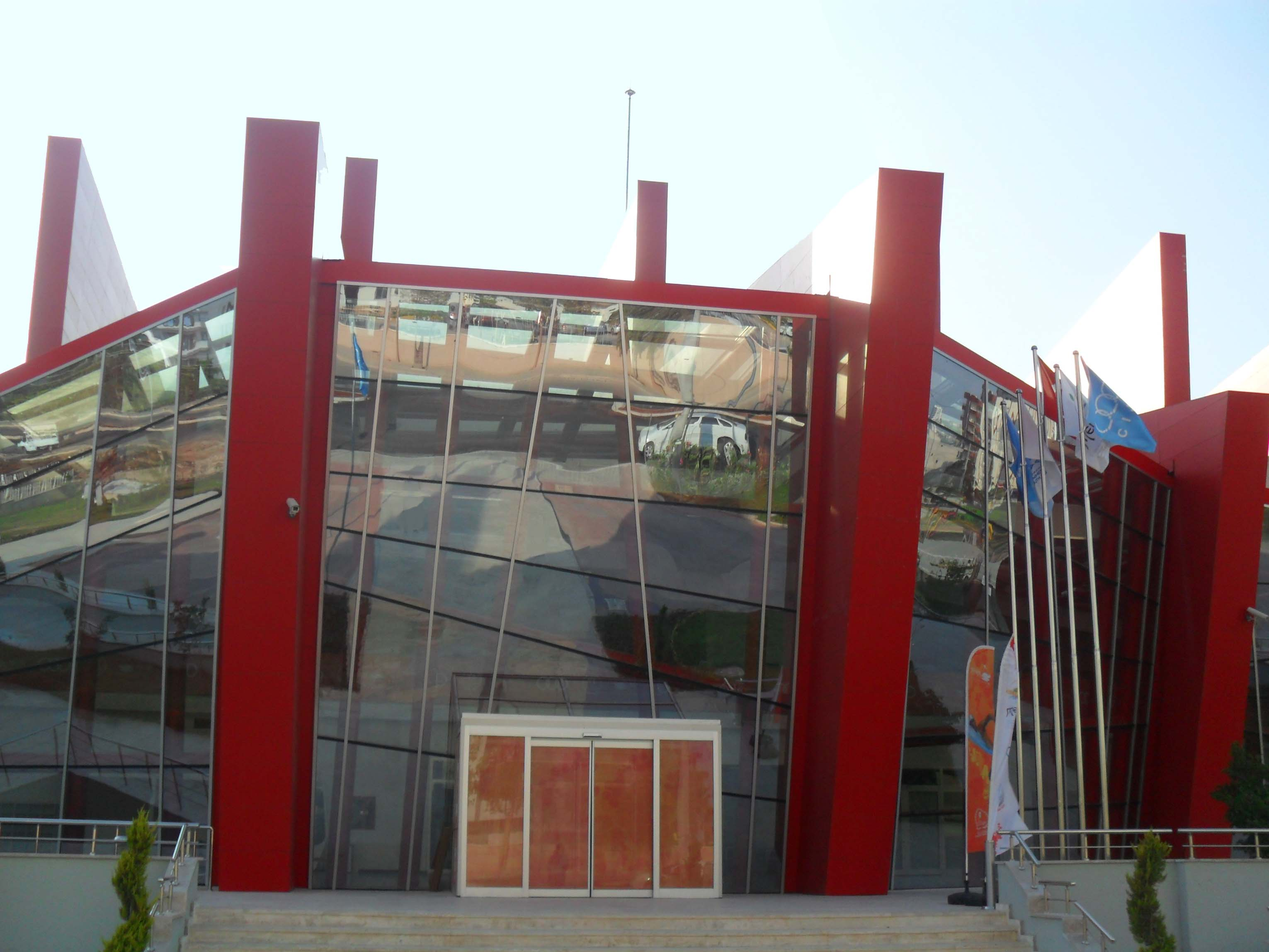
Mersin Olympic Swimming Pool

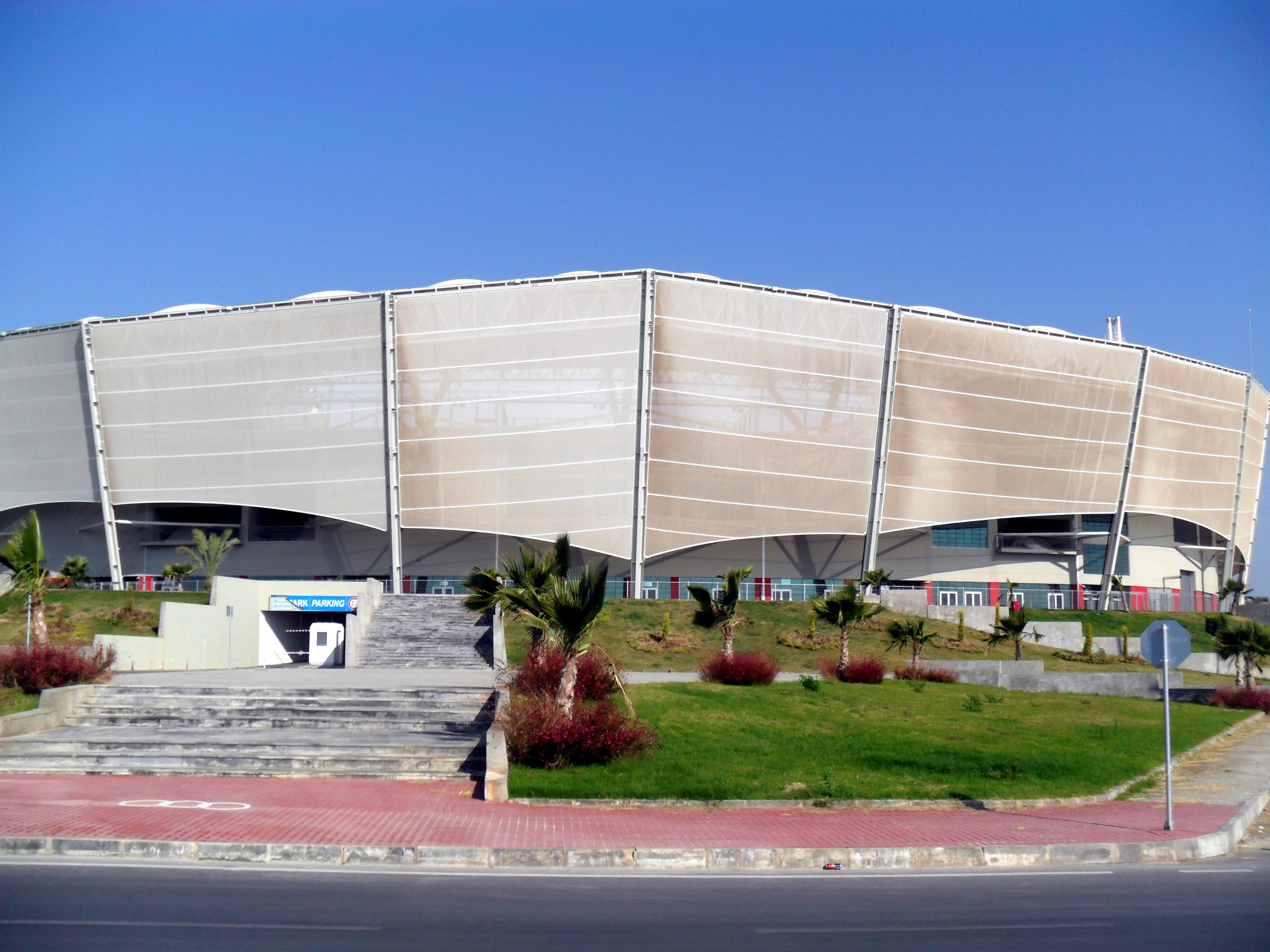
Mersin Arena

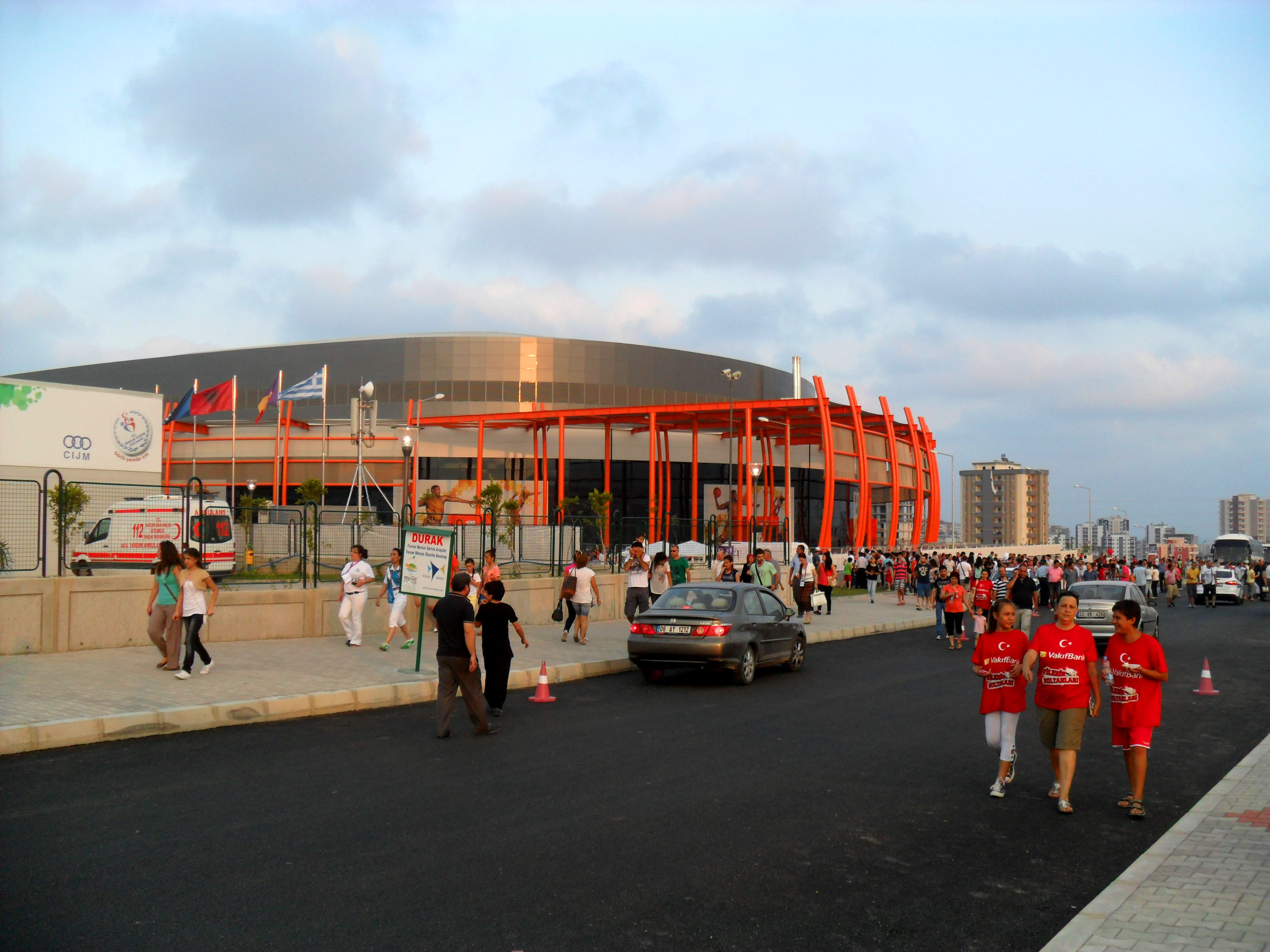
Sporthall in Mersin

== Universities ==
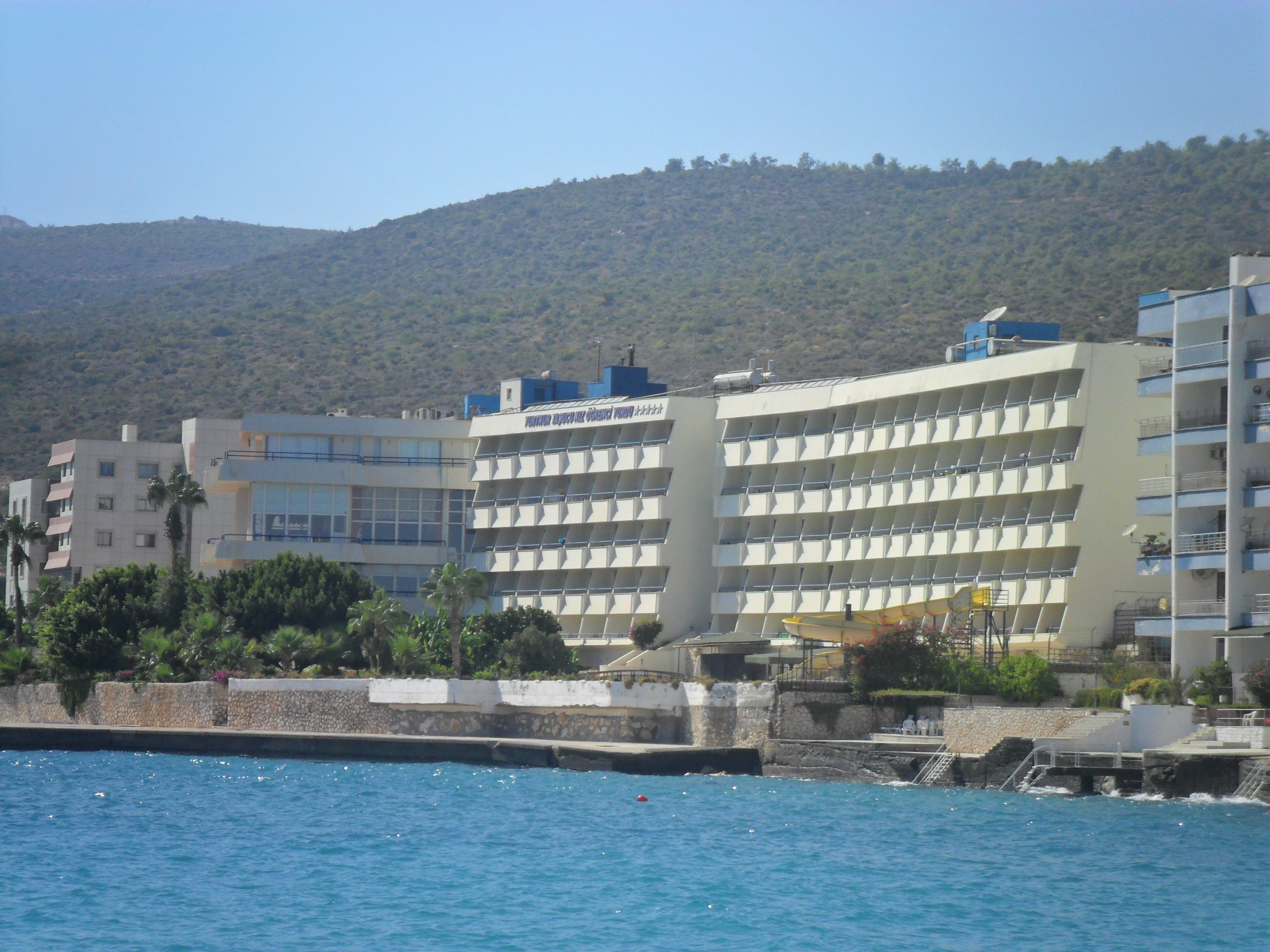
Mersin University Dorms

Mersin University was founded in 1992 and started teaching in 1993–1994, with eleven faculties, six schools and nine vocational schools. The university has had about 10,000 graduates, has broadened its current academic staff to more than 2,100 academicians.

Toros University is a non-profit private foundation established in Mersin in 2009.

Çağ University

Tarsus University

== Twin towns – sister cities ==
Mersin is twinned with:

- Durban, South Africa
- Gazi Mağusa, Northern Cyprus (Note: Gazi Mağusa, also known as Famagusta, is de jure a part of Republic of Cyprus, but the city is de facto administrated by the self declared Turkish Republic of Northern Cyprus since the Turkish invasion of Cyprus in 1974. The twinning is between Northern Cypriot and Turkish administration.)
- Kherson, Ukraine
- Klaipėda, Lithuania
- Kushimoto, Japan, where there is a Turkish Memorial and Museum in commemoration of the 1890-sunken Ottoman frigate Ertuğrul. A street in Mersin is named after the Japanese town.
- Nizhnekamsk, Russia
- Oberhausen, Germany
- Ölgii, Mongolia
- Ufa, Russia
- Valparaíso, Chile
- West Palm Beach, United States

== Notable people ==
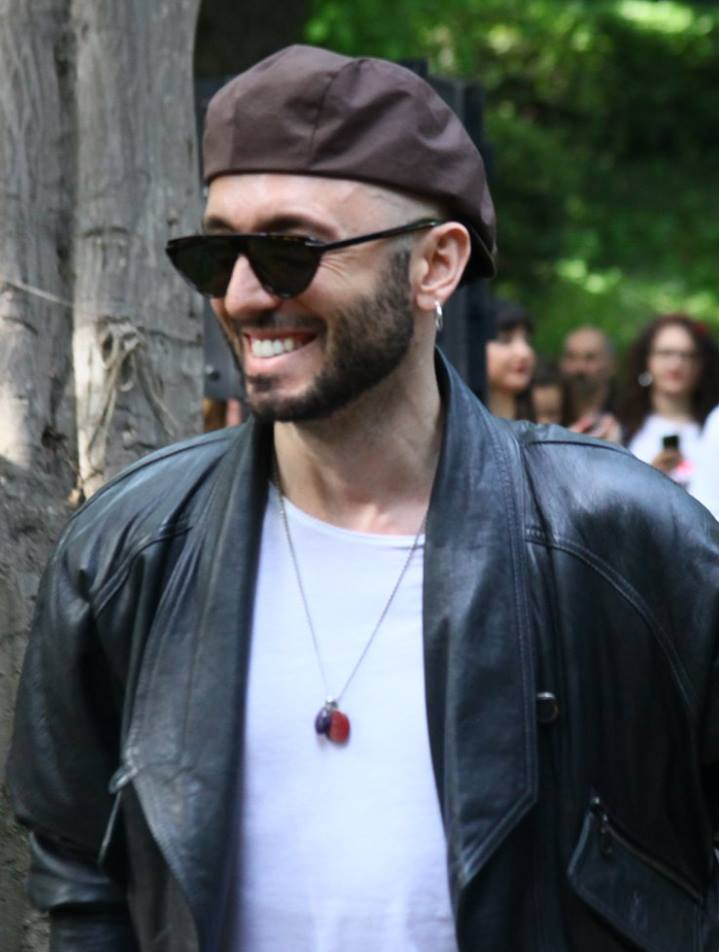
Mabel Matiz

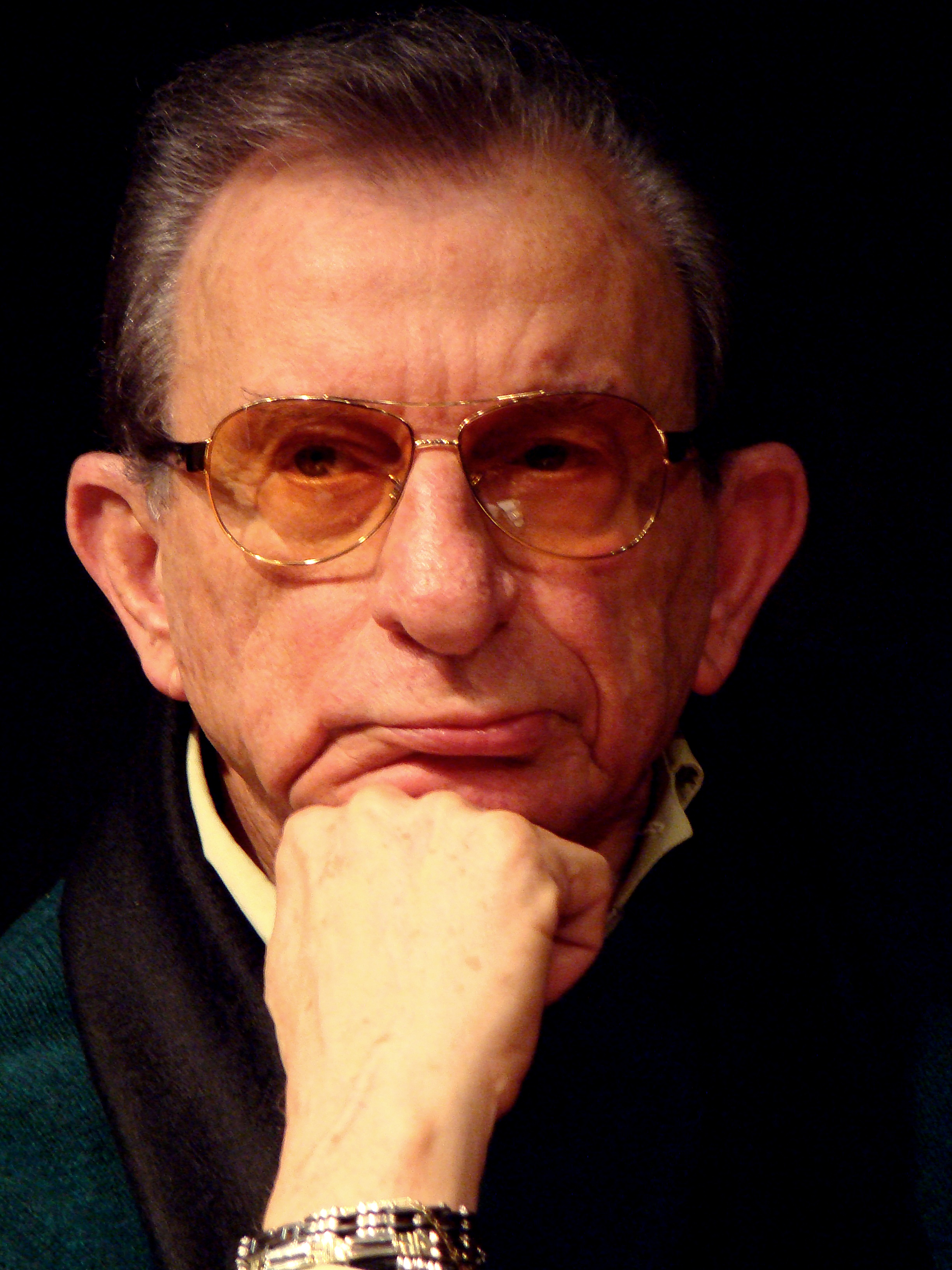
Haldun Dormen

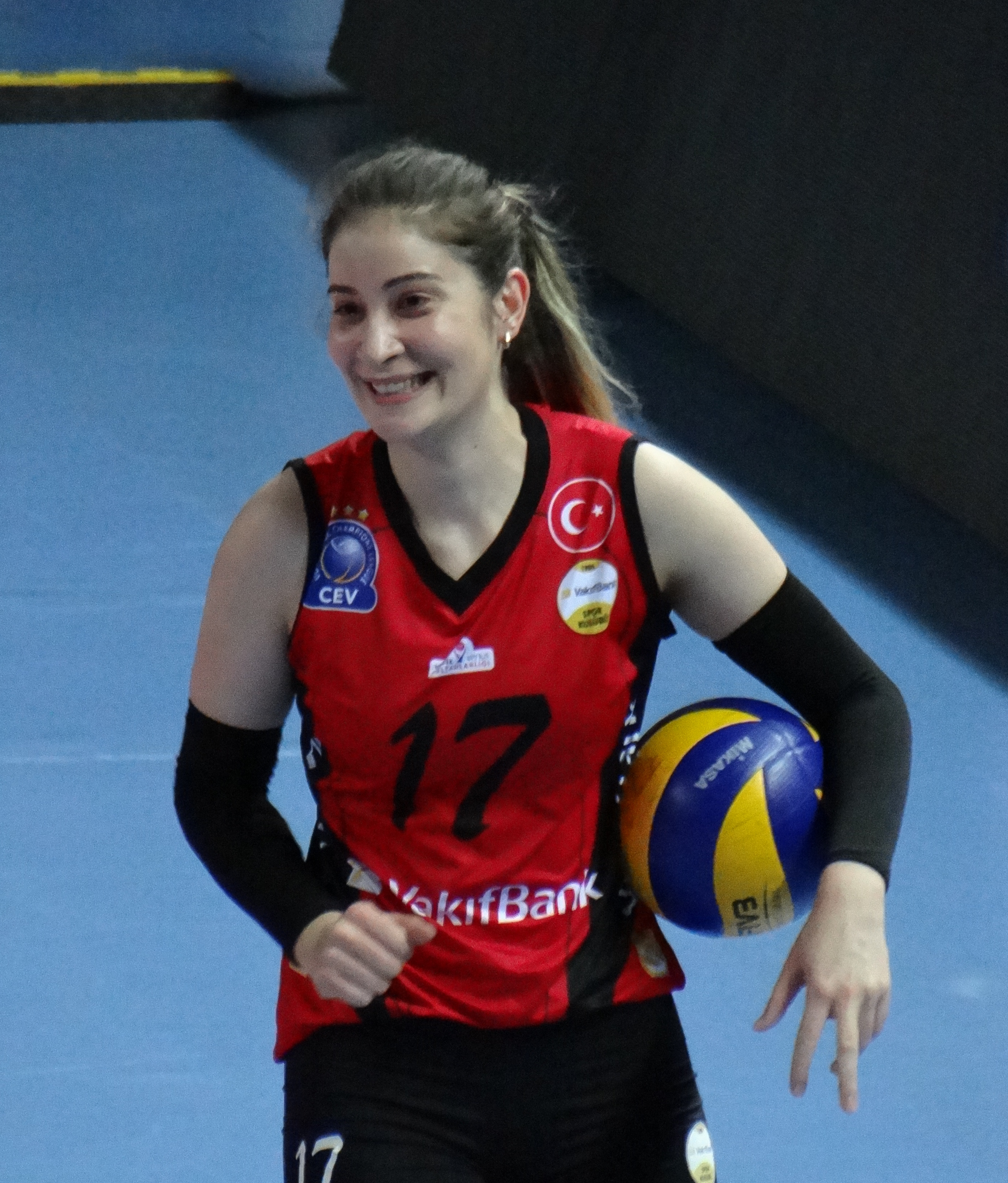
Tuğba Şenoğlu

Music

- Mabel Matiz – Turkish pop musician
- Bergen – Turkish Arabesque singer
- Musa Eroğlu – Turkish folk music artist, folk poetry, composer, musician
- Mansur Ark – Turkish pop and R&B singer
- Manuş Baba – Pop folk musician
- Nevit Kodallı – composer
- Eda Özülkü – Turkish pop musician
- Metin Özülkü – musician, singer-songwriter, composer and arranger

=== Arts and entertainment ===
Film, television, and theatre

- Haldun Dormen – theatre & film actor and director
- Atıf Yılmaz – film director and producer
- Olga Nakkas – film director
- Mustafa Üstündağ – actor

Literature and visual arts

- Gencay Kasapçı – painter
- Seyhan Kurt – poet, writer, sociologist
- İpek Ongun – writer
- Suna Tanaltay – writer and psychologist

=== Business ===
- Mehmet Emin Karamehmet – businessman and founder of Çukurova Holding

=== Politics and military ===
- Müfide İlhan – first woman mayor in Turkey in the 1950s
- Cemal Mersinli – a pasha of the Ottoman Empire
- Macit Özcan – former mayor

=== Public figures ===
- Özgecan Aslan – Mersin University Psychology student
- Konca Kuriş – Islamic feminist writer, journalist and activist

=== Science ===
- Ahmet Mete Işıkara – scientist

=== Sports ===
- Erman Toroğlu – former footballer, FIFA-level referee
- Emre Demir – footballer
- Ahmet Kireççi (aka Mersinli Ahmet) – Olympic medalist wrestler
- Tuğba Şenoğlu – volleyball player
- Nevin Yanıt – athlete

== See also ==
- Mersin Martyrs' Memorial
- Gözne
- Soli, Cilicia
- Kazanlı
- List of mayors of Mersin
- Attorney General of Mersin
- Atatürk Monument (Mersin)
- Gulf of Mersin
- Dikilitaş, Mersin
- Mersin Feneri
- Atatürk Parkı
- Tırmıl
- Mersin Citrus Festival
- Radyo Çukurova
