= Olga Nakkas =

Turkish-Lebanese film director (born 1953)

- Born: 30 March 1953; Mersin, Turkey
- Other names: Naccache
- Occupation: Documentary film director

Olga Nakkas or Naccache (born 30 March 1953) is a Turkish-Lebanese documentary film director.

== Early life ==
Olga Nakkas was born on 30 March 1953 in Mersin, Turkey, the daughter of a Turkish father and a Lebanese mother. Her family moved to Beirut, Lebanon in 1958. She studied in Paris and worked for the BBC and Canal Plus. At the end of the Lebanese Civil War, she returned to Beirut.

== Works ==
Her film ‘Ashura (1987) is about Shi‘ites in southern Lebanon during the holiday of Ashura. She described her work about women in post-war Lebanon, Lebanon, Bits and Pieces (1992), as "the first film into which I really put a lot of myself. It deals with my relationship with my past and with a country I love and hate at the same time." She focused on the country again in Mother, Lebanon & Me (2009). She examined issues around hijabs and veils in Turkey in Women of Turkey: Between Islam and Secularism (2006).

Her film Mon ami Imad et le taxi, about a taxi driver wandering the empty streets of civil war Beirut, began as an unfinished Super 8 film shot in 1985. Né à Beyrouth combined her film with another unfinished work by Hassan Zbib and presented it with an electronic music soundtrack at their 2006 festival.

== Filmography ==
- Saida, portrait d’une ville (Saida, Portrait of a City), 35 mm, 19 min., 1986
- ‘Ashura/Ashoura (Ashura), 35 mm, 27 min, co-directed, 1987
- Lubnan min taraf ila taraf akhar/Lebanon, Bits and Pieces, 35 mm, 60 min, 1992
- Halima, 35 mm, 40 min., 2000.
- Women of Turkey: Between Islam and Secularism, 52 min, 2006.
- Mon ami Imad et le taxi (My Friend Imad and the Taxi), Super 8, 19 min., co-directed with Hassan Zbib, 1985/2006.
- Mother, Lebanon & Me. 70 min, 2009.
- Istanbul Taxi, 52 min, 2010.
- Souriya, The Challenge, 2016.
