= Mersin Citrus Festival =

Mersin Citrus Festival Mersin Narenciye Festivali
- Status: Active
- Genre: Festival
- Frequency: Annually
- Location: Mersin
- Country: Turkey
- Years active: 2010–present

Mersin Citrus Festival (Turkish: Mersin Narenciye Festivali) is an annual festival held in Mersin, Turkey.

== Citrus in Mersin economy ==
Citrus is the main crop of Mersin. According to official figures between 2006 and 2009, the total production in Turkey has risen from 3,220,435 tonnes to 3,513,772 tonnes. In the same period the production in Mersin Province has risen from 861,327 tonnes to 1,118,858 tonnes. In 2009, the citrus production in Mersin area consisted of 54% lemon, 29% orange, 14% tangerina and 3% grapefruit.

== Festival ==
The annual Citrus Festival was established in 2010. Each year, the festival is held in a weekend in November. The main purpose of the festival is to promote Mersin citrus and the touristic potential of the city and the surroundings. The festival begins by the short speeches of the trade union speakers, the mayor and the governors. Then, a parade of various life size objects made of citrus and folkloric groups from many foreign countries takes place. Fashion shows and dance shows of the folkloric groups both in the city and in Kızkalesi continue two days long.

According to festival page, the foreign participants to the festival in 2013 were Albania, Algeria, Azerbaijan, Belarus, Bosnia-Herzegovina, Bulgaria, Chile, Croatia, Ghana, Georgia, Greece, India, Indonesia, Iraq, Kazakhstan, Kosovo, Moldavia, Montenegro, PROC, Romania, Russia, Serbia, Slovakia, Thailand, and Ukraine, as well as the Autonomous Republic of Adjara, Bashkurdistan, Chechenia and Chuvashia The inauguration of this fourth edition of the festival was presided by Zafer Çağlayan, Minister of Economy of Turkey. The public relations and media activities of this edition were taken care of by the local Turkish company Penguen.

== Gallery ==
The following images are from the parade of the 2013 festival

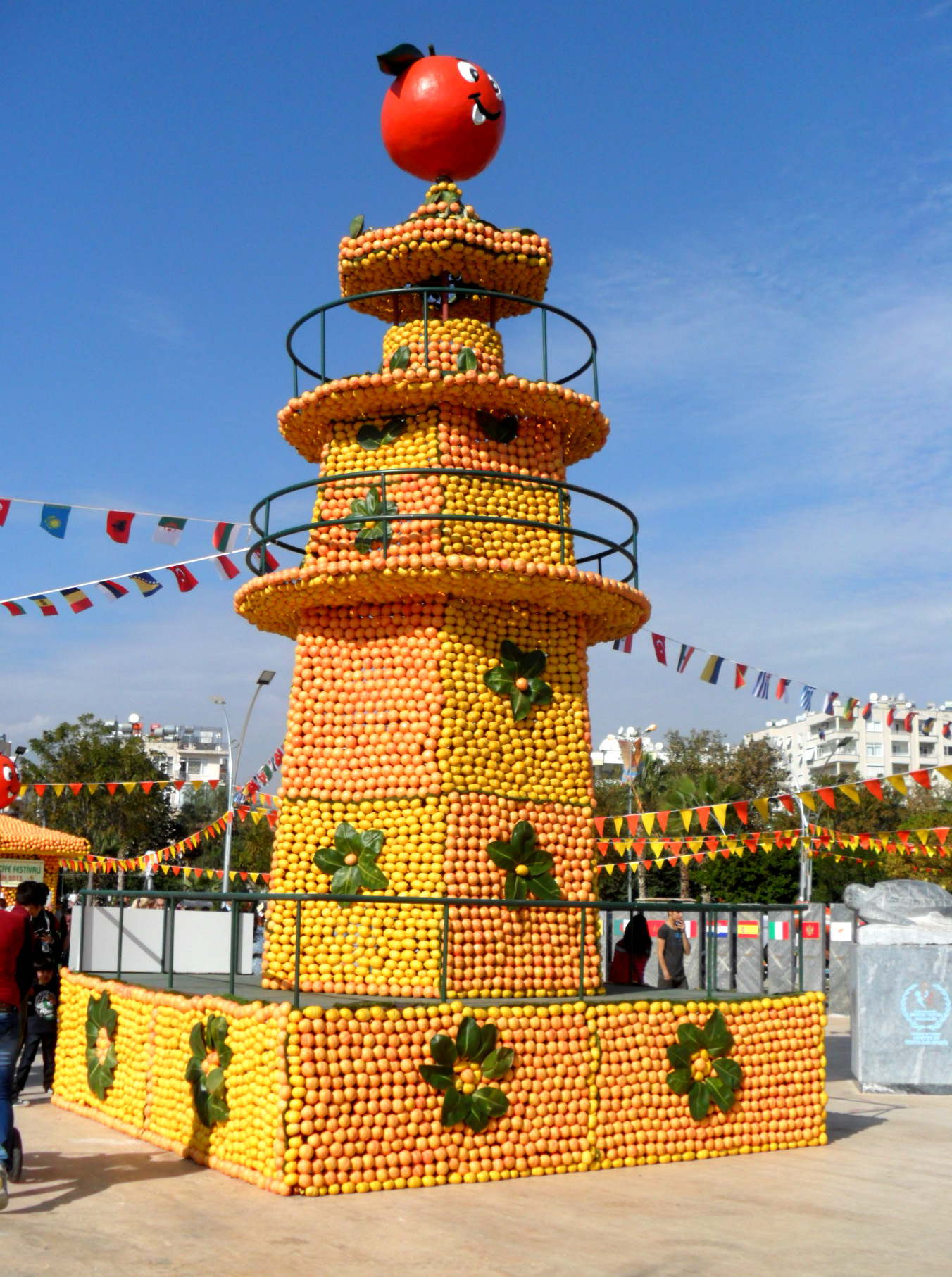
Citrus Lighthouse in Mersin Citrus Festival

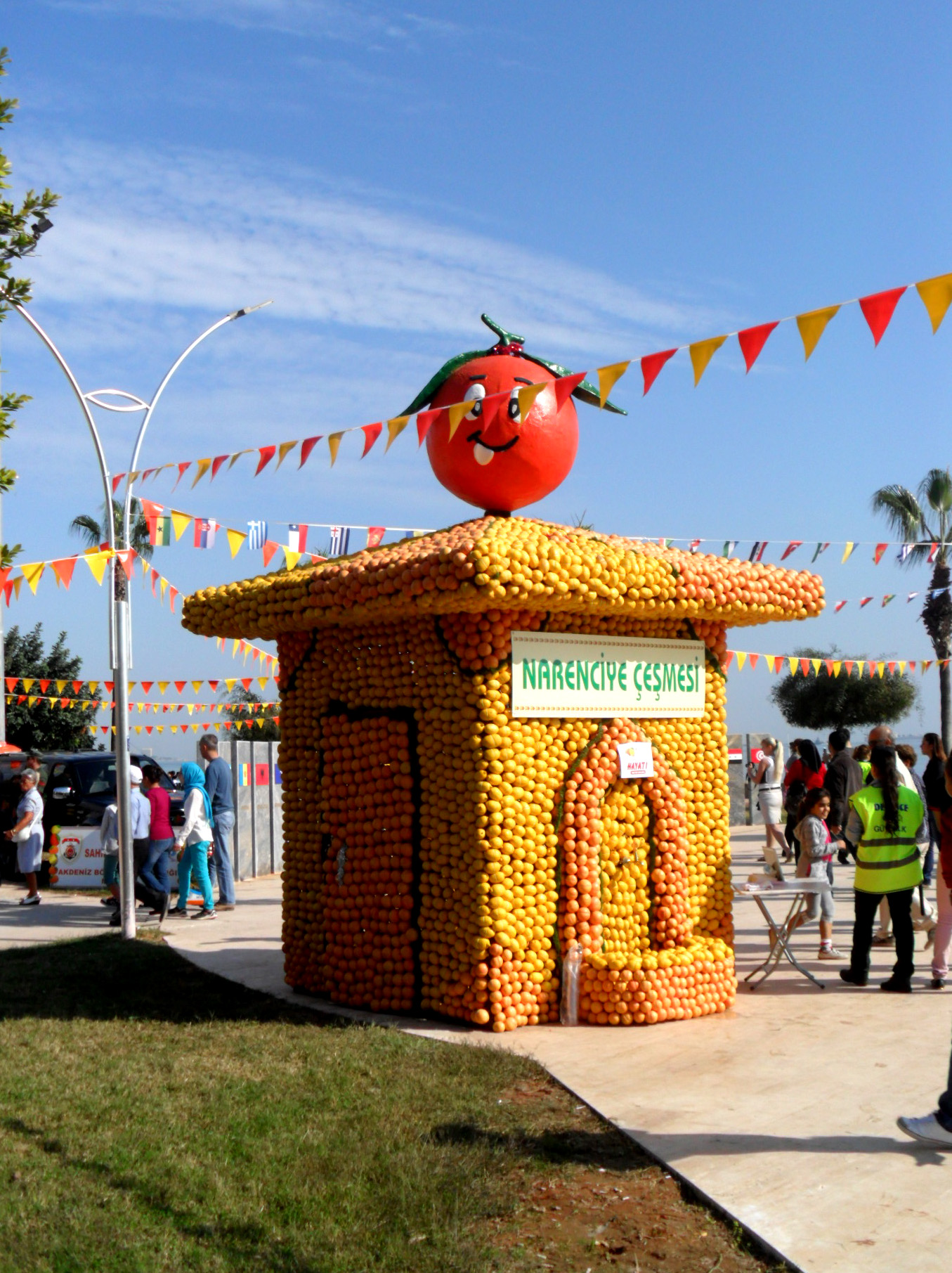
Citrus Fountain in Mersin Citrus Festival

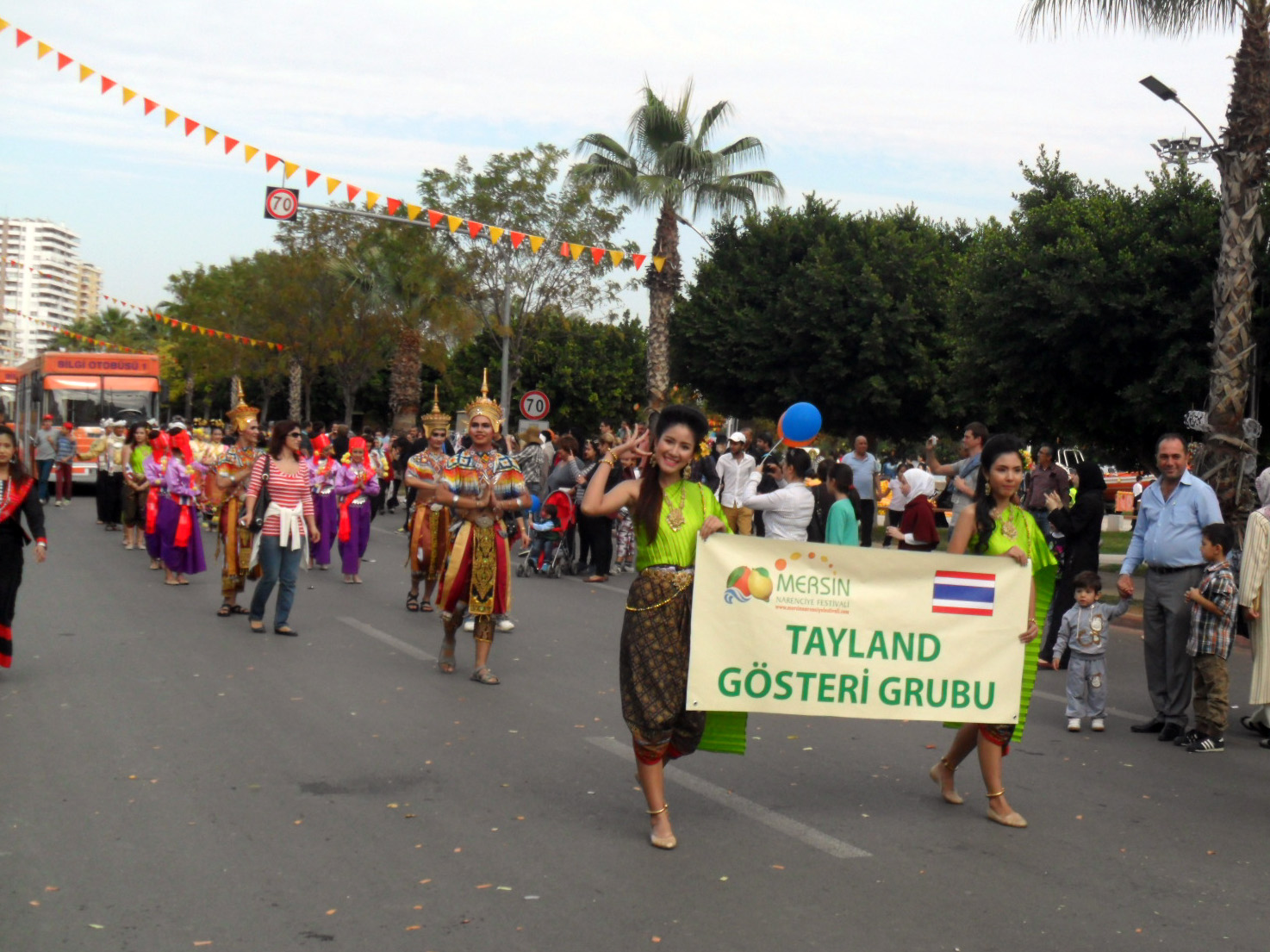
Thailand group in Mersin Citrus Festival

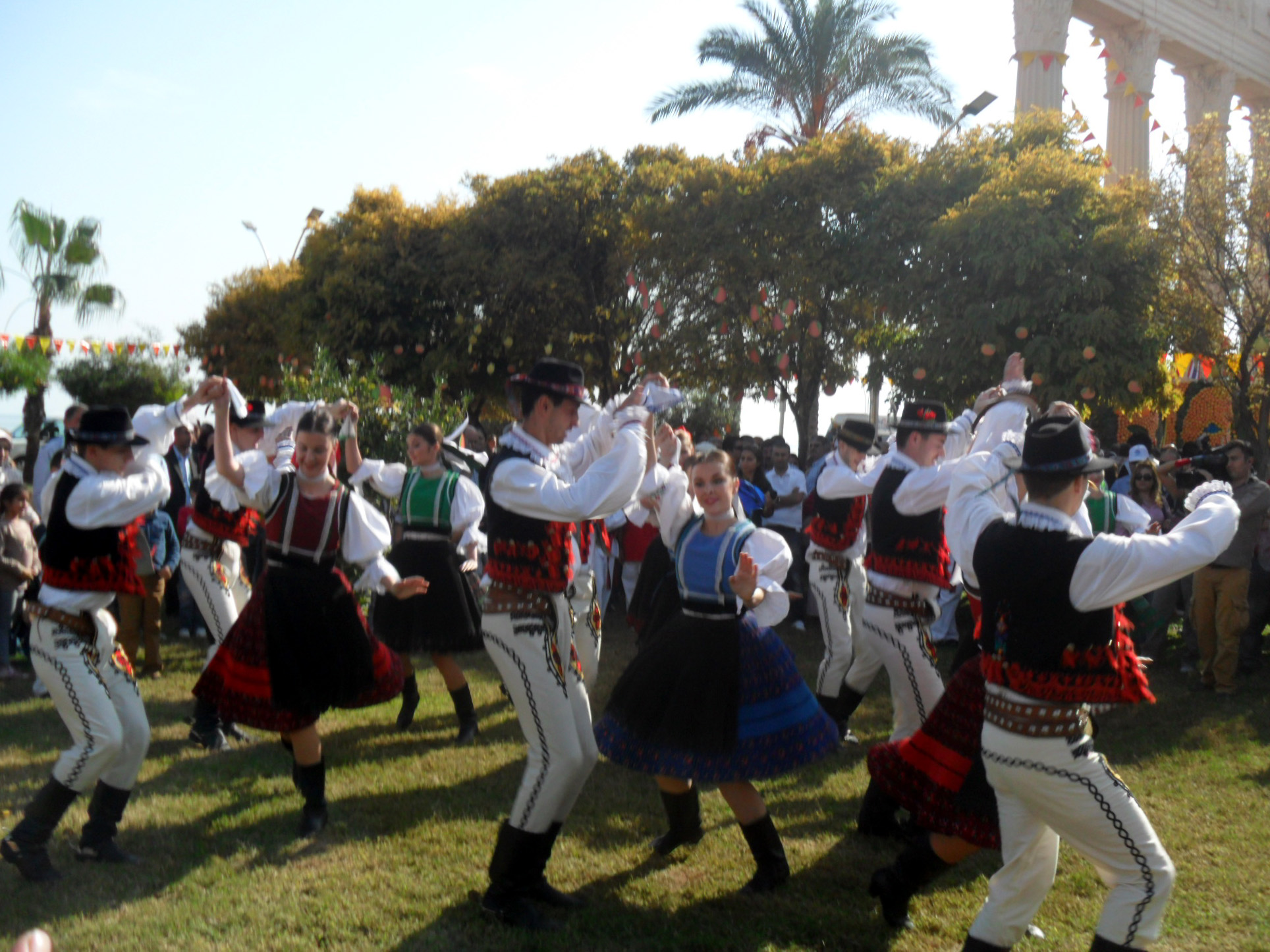
Dance in Mersin Citrus Festival

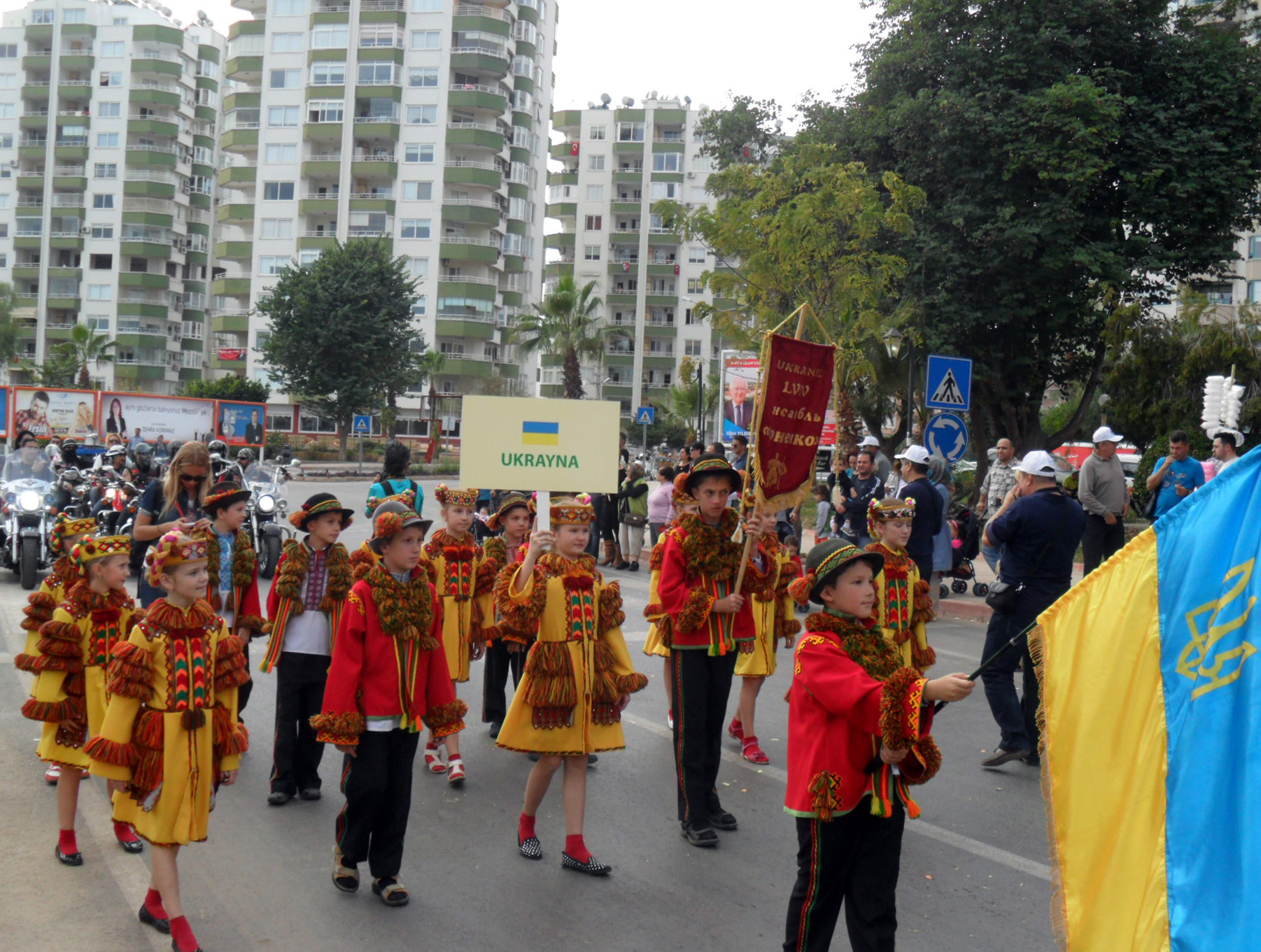
Kids from Ukraine in Mersin Citrus Festival

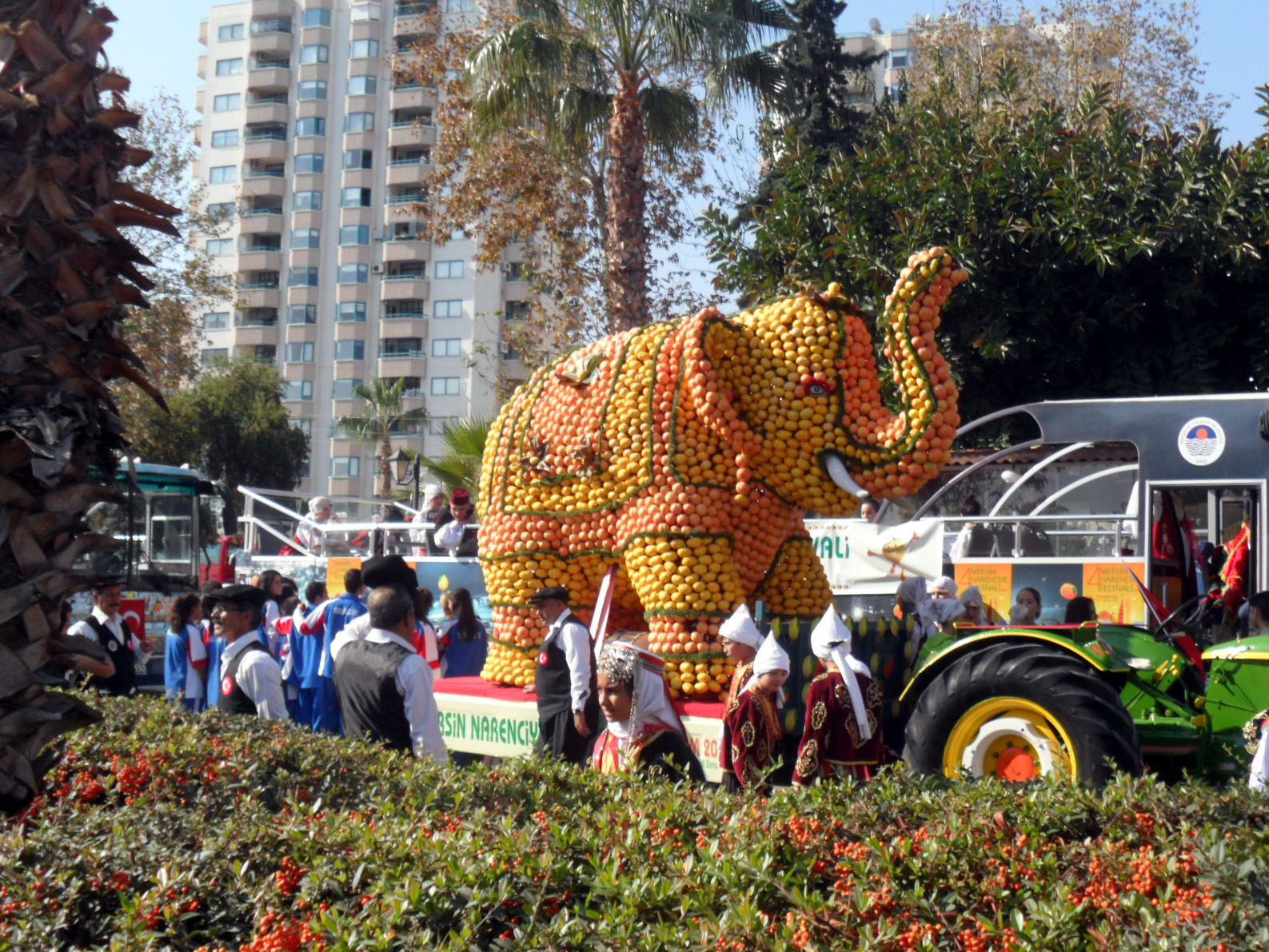
Elephant in Mersin Citrus Festival
