= Attorney General of Mersin =

Attorney General of the Republic for Mersin
- Mersin Cumhuriyet Başsavcılığı
- Incumbent; Mustafa Yıldırım
- Minister of Justice
- Appointer: Supreme Board of Judges and Prosecutors
- Term length: No term limit
- Constituting instrument: Constitution of Turkey
- Website: Mersin Courts of Law

The Attorney General of the Republic for Mersin (Turkish: Mersin Cumhuriyet Başsavcılığı) is the office of the chief prosecutor responsible for the Turkish city of Mersin. The Attorney General is accompanied by several prosecutors, but the Supreme Board of Judges and Prosecutors (HSYK) can vote on the recommendation of the Ministry of Justice to assign Deputy Attorneys General to the city of Mersin to aid the sitting Attorney General if necessary.

== Functions and responsibilities ==
=== Office ===
The Office of the Attorney General of Mersin has the following functions and responsibilities.

- To make inquiries and pursue investigations into whether to open a public trial
- To observe legal proceedings on behalf of the public and resort to legal remedies when necessary
- To implement and observe finalised court orders

=== Office-holder ===
The Attorney General of Mersin has the following functions and responsibilities.

- To represent the Office of the Attorney General of Mersin
- To ensure that the Office of the Attorney General works in an efficient manner on a regular basis and to assign roles to other officials
- To perform the tasks required by the judicial office, to attend the hearings and to resort to legal remedies
- To perform other duties assigned by law

== See also ==
- Governor (Turkey)
- Judiciary of Turkey
