= Dikilitaş =

Dikilitaş (Turkish for "obelisk", from dikili "upright" + taş "stone") can refer to:

== Monuments ==
- The Obelisk of Theodosius in Sultanahmet Square, Istanbul, Turkey
- A Phrygian rock monument near Tavşanlı, Kütahya Province, Turkey
- Dikilitaş, Mersin a monument and a neighbourhood in Mersin, Turkey
- Dikili Tash, a Neolithic and Bronze Age Settlement near Philippi, Greece

== Places ==
- Dikilitaş, a neighbourhood in the Akdeniz district of Mersin Province, Turkey
- Dikilitaş, a neighbourhood in the Beşiktaş district of Istanbul, Turkey
- Dikilitaş, Besni, a village in Besni district of Adıyaman Province, Turkey
- Dikilitaş, Ceyhan, a village in Ceyhan district of Adana Province, Turkey
- Dikilitaş, Gölbaşı, a neighborhood in the Gölbaşı district of Ankara Province, Turkey
- Dikilitaş, Kozan, a village in Kozan district of Adana Province, Turkey
- Dikilitaş, Niğde, a town in Niğde Province, Turkey
