= Mersin Martyrs' Memorial =

- Mersin Şehitler Anıtı
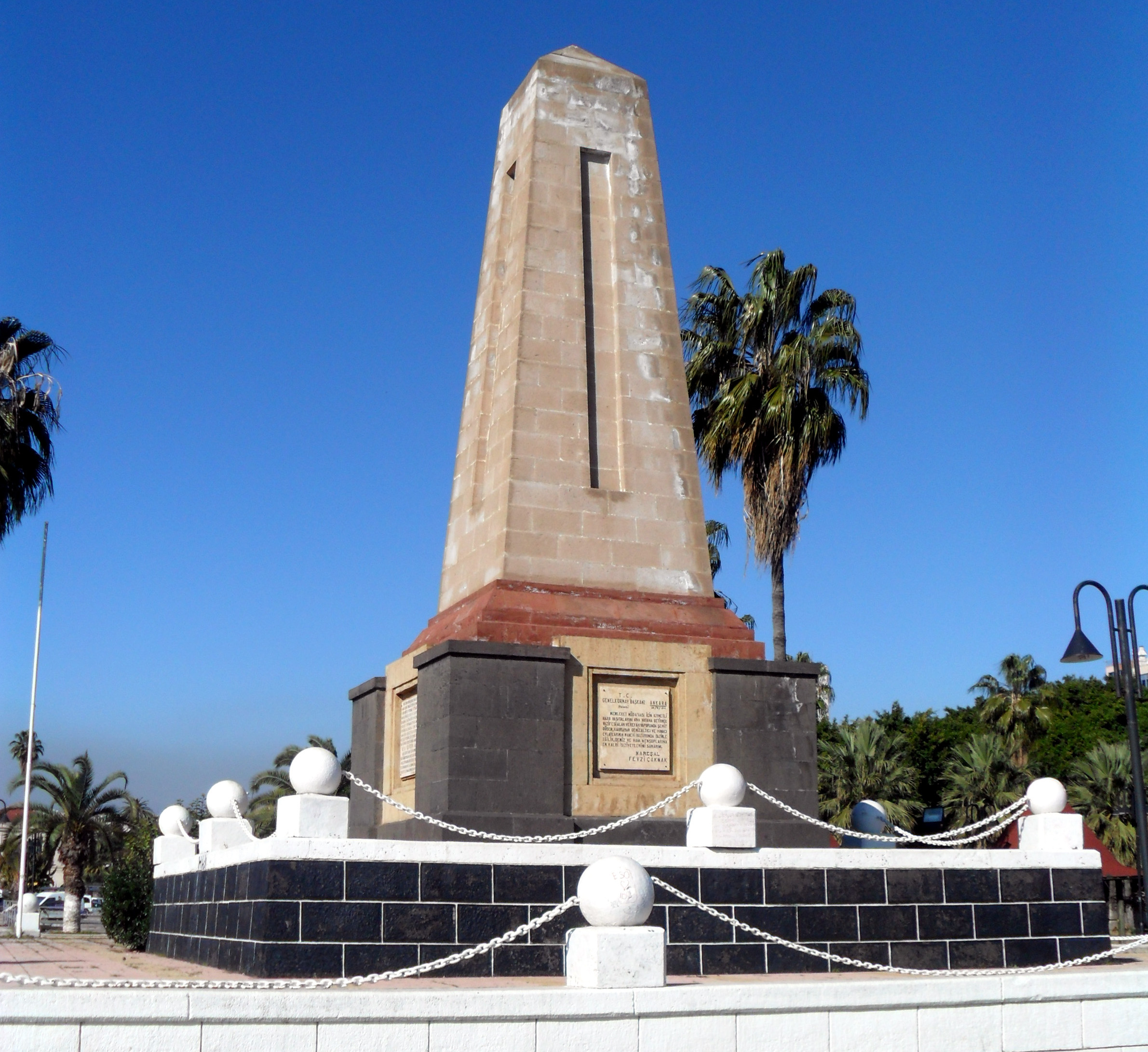
- Interactive map of Mersin Martyrs' Memorial
- Location: Atatürk Park, Mersin, Turkey
- Coordinates: 36°47′37″N 34°37′43″E
- Type: Memorial
- Opening date: June 23, 1971

Mersin Martyrs' Memorial (Turkish: Şehitler Anıtı), also known as the Monument of the Refah Martyrs, is a monument in Mersin, Turkey.

== Geography ==
The monument is situated in Atatürk Park of Mersin about 20 metres (66 ft) from the Mediterranean Sea coast at 36°47′37″N 34°37′43″E.

== Commemoration ==
Although the popular name of the monument refers to the Refah Tragedy, the monument actually memorializes two different marine events.

- 18 September 1890: Ottoman frigate Ertuğrul sank in Japan during her return voyage from Japan to Turkey due to bad weather. In this maritime accident more than 500 sailors were drowned.
- 23 June 1941: Turkish cargo ship named Refah which departed from Mersin port carrying about 200 military personnel for training in the United Kingdom, was torpedoed by an unidentified vessel (Turkey was neutral in World War II.) 168 people were killed during this attack.

== Construction history ==
When Celal Eyiveoğlu, the commander of the Turkish Naval Forces paid an official visit to Japan in 1970, he visited a monument in Kushimoto Turkish Memorial and Museum to commemorate the Ertuğrul event. He was inspired and after returning home, he persuaded Mersin governorship and municipality to erect a similar monument in Mersin The monument was officially opened on 23 June 1972

== Monument ==
The monument resembles a fat obelisk. It is in an 800 square metres (8,600 sq ft) yard. The outer dimensions of the monument are 10×10 m^{2} ( 37.7×32.7 ft ^{2}) Its door faces northwest (i.e., city center) On its three other walls there are inscriptions. One (southwest) inscription is about Refah tragedy, one (southwest) is about the message of Fevzi Çakmak, the chief of staff during the Refah tragedy. The third inscription (northeast) is about the Ertuğrul frigate. On this inscription, the Kushimoto monument is mentioned.

== See also ==
- 125 Years Memory: Drama film commemorating the 125th anniversary of the Ertuğrul incident
