= Mersin Aquapark =

Water park in Mersin, Turkey

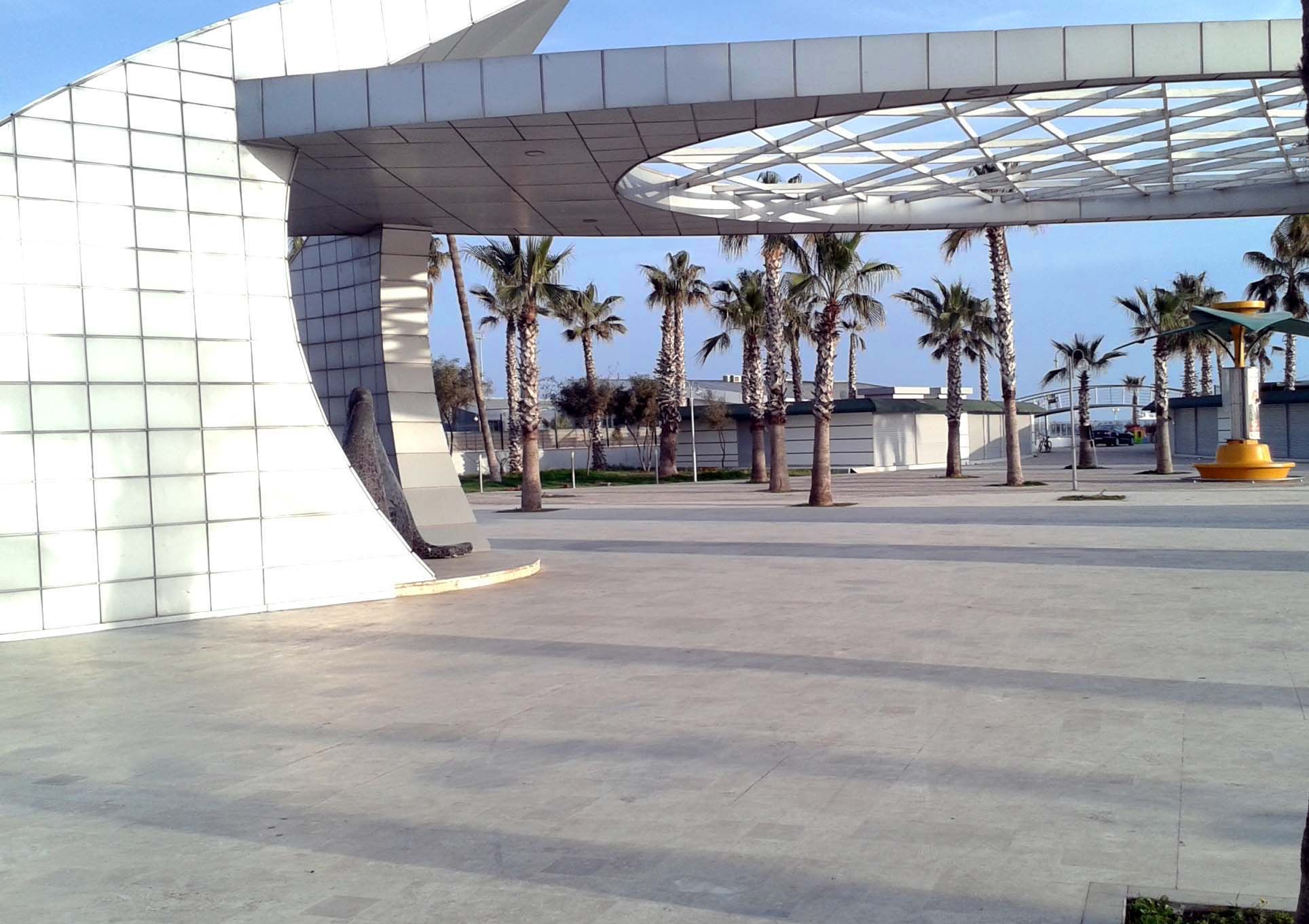
- Aquapark from the north
- Interactive map of Mersin Aquapark
- Location: Mersin, Turkey
- Coordinates: 36.7884°N 34.6274°E
- Area: 40 da

Mersin Aquapark is a waterpark in Mersin, Turkey.

== Geography ==
The aquapark is situated to the west of the Atatürk Park and the western breakwater of Mersin Harbor. An amusement park and Müftü River are to the west and the Mediterranean Sea coastline is to the south of the aquapark.

== History ==
The aquapark was established by the Mersin municipality with a total cost of 35 million Turkish liras (During the construction 1.7 TL = $1). But in 2012 a Mersin citizen filed a lawsuit claiming that the establishment does not respect the relevant coastal regulations which give the priority of the coastal usage to public. The court ruled that the establishment must be removed. Mersin municipality challenged the decision.

== Details ==
In the 50-decare aquapark there is an Olympic pool, two children’s pools, diving towers, five waterslides with different heights and a skating rink. There are also coffee houses, restaurants and a ball room.
