= İsmet İnönü Boulevard =

Major urban road in Mersin, Turkey

- Native name: İsmet İnönü Bulvarı (Turkish)
- Length: 11.2 km (7.0 mi)
- Location: Mersin, Turkey
- Coordinates: 36°48′46″N 34°39′18″E
- Major junctions: Gazi Mustafa Kemal Boulevard

İsmet İnönü Boulevard (Turkish: İsmet İnönü Bulvarı) is a major avenue in Mersin, Turkey. It is named after İsmet İnönü (1884–1973), the second president of Turkish Republic between 1938 and 1950.

== Geography ==
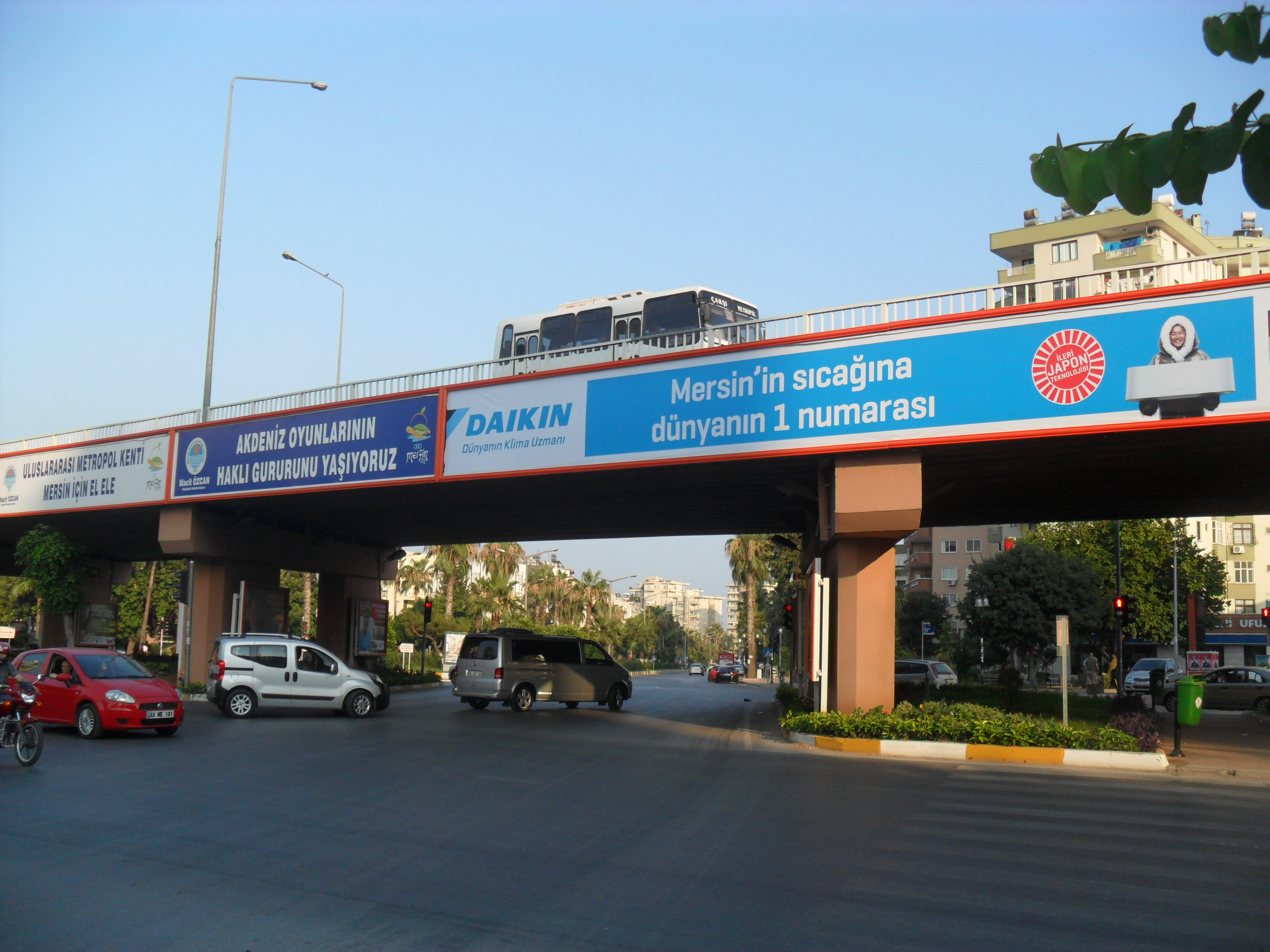
Upper:Gazi Mustafa Kemal Boulevard Lower: İsmet İnönü Boulevard

The eastern end of the boulevard is to the north of the Mersin Harbor, where it meets the state highway D.400 at about 36°48′46″N 34°39′18″E. It runs parallel to the Mediterranean Sea coast line to south west for about 4.5 km (2.8 mi) within the second-level municipality of Akdeniz. The Atatürk Park is between the boulevard and the sea. The governor's office, mayor's office, Mersin Grand Mosque Atatürk Manument and Mersin Halkevi are situated to the north of the boulevard.

It crosses Müftü River and continues within Yenişehir second-level municipality. The Tevfik Sırrı Gür Stadium is to the north of the boulevard and Mersin Lighthouse is to the south. At the junction with Adnan Menderes Boulevard, it turns to northwest and runs perpendicular to the sea coast. Its total course in Yenişehir municipality is about 6.7 km (4.2 mi) . In this course, it intersects with Gazi Mustafa Kemal Boulevard by an interchange. The Nevin Yanıt Athletics Complex and the Macit Özcan Sports Complex are situated on the north portion of the boulevard.

== History ==
Up to 1950s, the first 4.5 km (2.8 mi) of the boulevard was actually the coast line. During the construction of the harbor the dredged material of the sea basin was spread out in front of the city to build the boulevard and Atatürk Park. Rest of the boulevard was constructed after the 1980s.
