= Kushimoto (disambiguation) =

Kushimoto is a town at Wakayama Prefecture in Japan, and it may refer to:

== Places ==
- Kushimoto, Wakayama, a coastal town located in Higashimuro District, Wakayama Prefecture in western Japan
- Kushimoto Station, a railway station in Kushimoto, Higashimuro District, Wakayama Prefecture, Japan
- Kushimoto Street, a business street in Mersin, Turkey, a twin city of Kushimoto
- Kushimoto Turkish Memorial and Museum, a monument and a museum to commemorate the sailors of the Ottoman frigate Ertuğrul, which sunk in 1890 off Kushimoto, Wakayama in Japan
