= Kushimoto Street =

Street in Yenişehir, Turkey

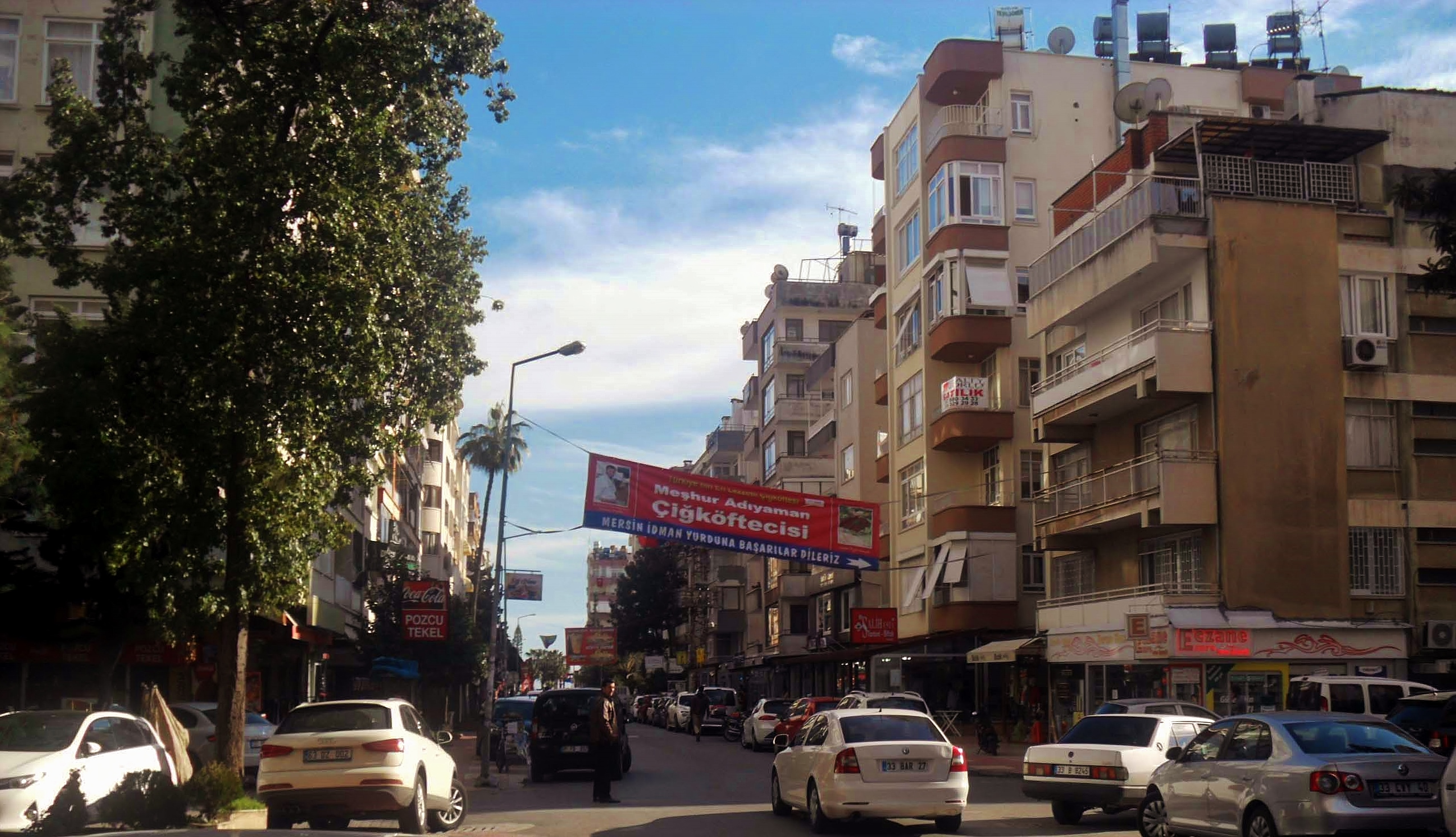
- Interactive map of Kushimoto Street
- Native name: Kushimoto Sokağı (Turkish)
- Former name: 4002 Street
- Addresses: İnönü mah., Yenişehir, Mersin
- Location: Yenişehir, Mersin, Turkey
- Coordinates: 36°47′N 34°36′E
- north end: Gazi Mustafa Kemal Boulevard ( D.400)
- south end: Adnan Menderes Boulevard

Construction
- Inauguration: 1996 (renamed)

Kushimoto Street (Turkish: Kushimoto Sokağı) is a business street located in Yenişehir, Mersin district of Mersin, southern Turkey.

Formerly known as the "4002 Street", it connects Gazi Mustafa Kemal Boulevard ( D.400) in the north with Adnan Menderes Boulevard in the south. In 1996, Mersin municipality renamed the street after Kushimoto, which is the Japanese twin city of Mersin. Kushimoto hosts the Turkish Memorial and Museum in commemoration of the 1890-sunken Ottoman frigate Ertuğrul .

Presently, the street, as well as the four intersecting second level streets, have a wide variety of shops and restaurants. A small park is situated to the west of the Kushimoto Street.

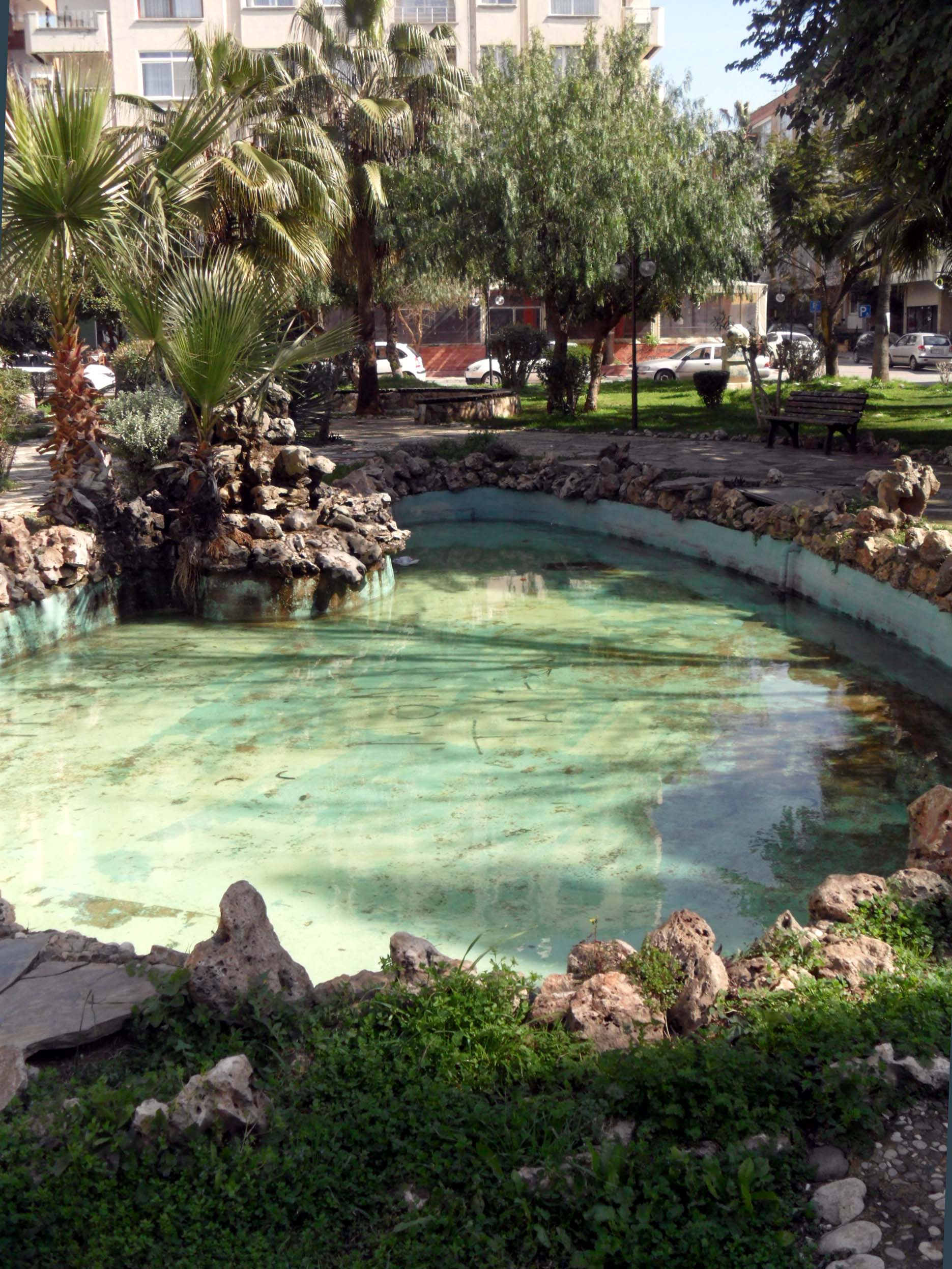
İnönü Park to the west of the street
