= Esenli (disambiguation) =

Esenli can refer to:

- Esenli
- Esenli, Bigadiç
- Esenli, Çilimli
- Esenli, Hınıs
- Esenli, Kastamonu
