= Atatürk Cultural Center in Mersin =

Cultural center in Mersin, Turkey

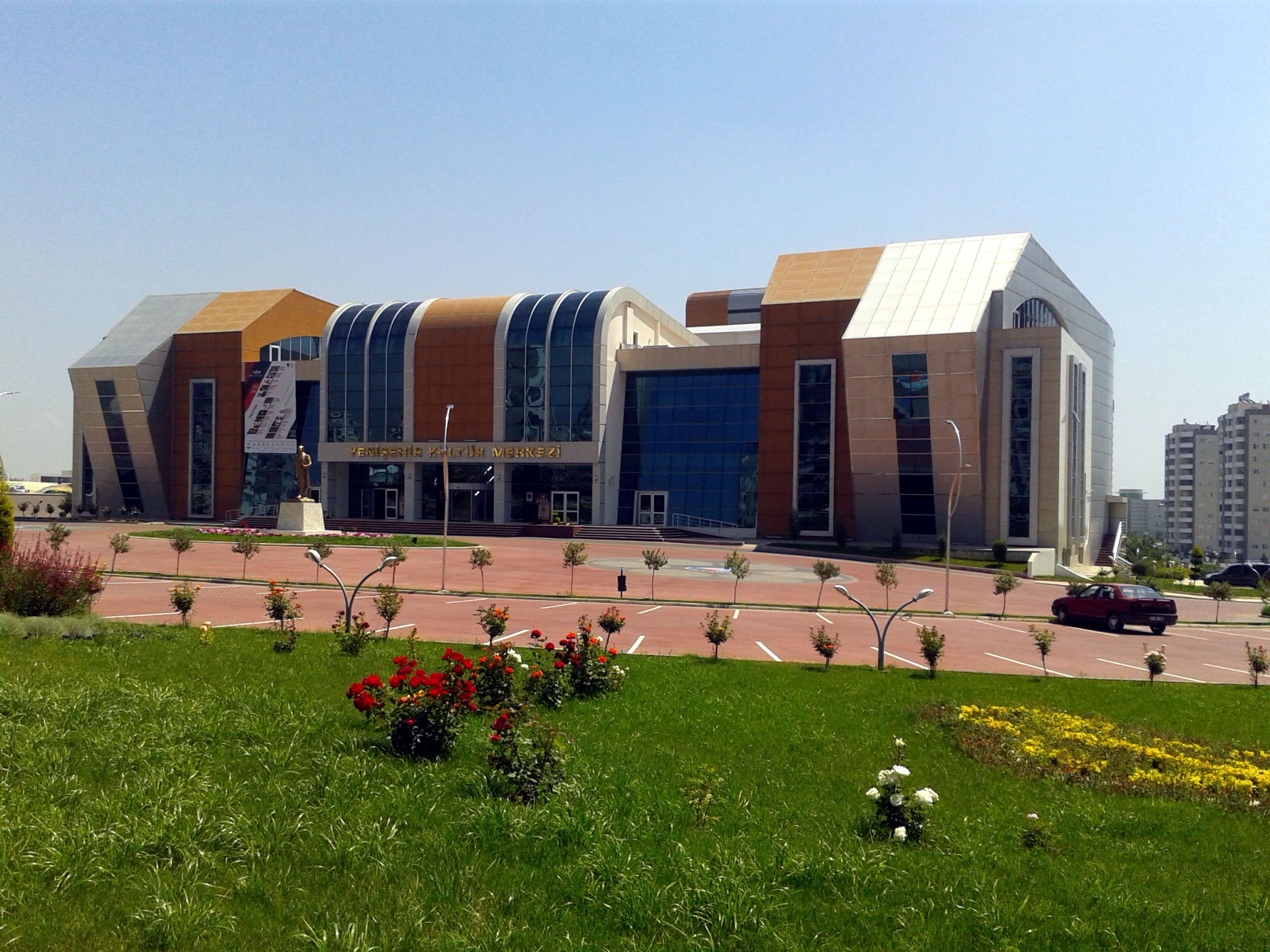

Atatürk Cultural Center is a building complex for cultural events in Mersin, Turkey. Its full name is "Yenişehir Municipaty Atatürk Cultural Center" (Turkish: Yenişehir Belediyesi Atatürk Kültür Merkezi). Yenişehir is a central municipality in Mersin. Together with Mersin Halkevi and Mersin Congress and Exhibition Center this complex is used for the cultural activities in Mersin.

== Geography ==
The building at 36°48′16″N 34°35′15″E is on the 13th boulevard which runs parallel to the Mediterranean Sea coast. The municipality building is about 900 metres (3,000 ft) to the south east of the complex.

== History ==
In 2012, the Yenişehir mayor İbrahim Genç gave the approximate construction period as 1.5 years. The center was opened in October 2014.

== The building ==
The total area of the complex is 28,000 square metres (300,000 sq ft) including 300-car-capacity parking lot. The building base area is 7,000 square metres (75,000 sq ft) and the total area of the building (including upper floors) is 22,000 square metres (240,000 sq ft). There are three halls; a 1500-sitting-capacity big hall, a 500-sitting-capacity ballet hall and a 500-sitting-capacity conference center. The big hall is equipped with an orchestra pit and a 29 metres (95 ft) ceiling tower. There are also smaller halls of 25–150 sitting capacity as well as various facilities such as restaurants, dressing rooms etc.
