= Gazi Mustafa Kemal Boulevard =

Street in Mersin, Turkey

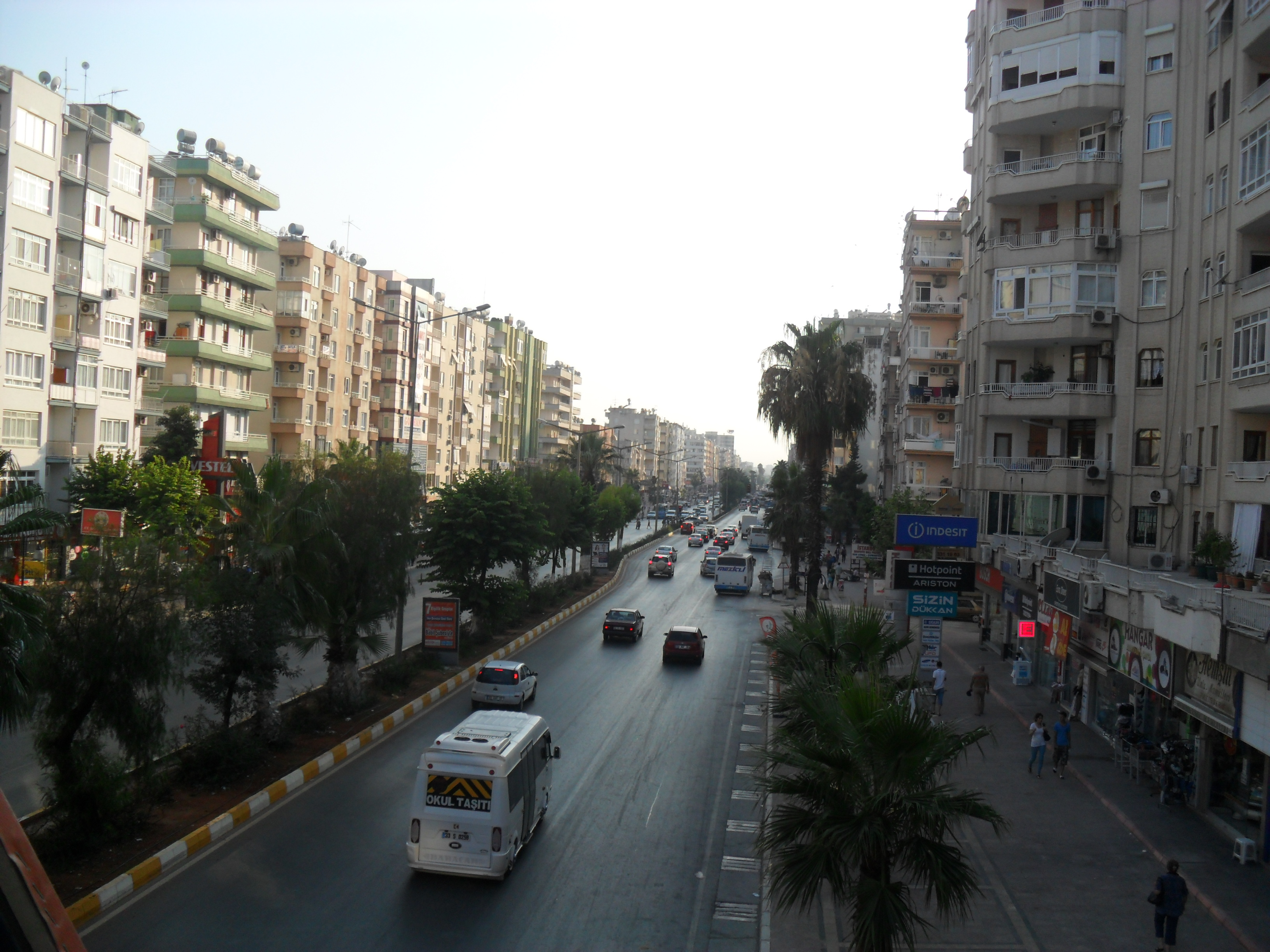
- GMK Boulevard from the overpass
- Interactive map of Gazi Mustafa Kemal Boulevard
- Native name: GMK Bulvarı (Turkish)
- Length: 16.25 km (10.10 mi)
- Location: Mersin, Turkey
- Major junctions: İsmet İnönü Boulevard

Gazi Mustafa Kemal Boulevard, abbreviated as GMK Boulevard, is a major avenue in Mersin, Turkey. It is named after Mustafa Kemal Atatürk (1881-1938), the founder of Turkish Republic.

== Geography ==
The boulevard is a part of the state highway D.400, where it passes through the urban fabric of Mersin.

The eastern end of the boulevard is to the north of the Mersin Harbor, at about 36°48′46″N 34°39′18″E. It runs to west for 3.25 km (2.02 mi). During this course in Akdeniz second level municipality, the boulevard passes on a bridge over the railroad. On both sides of the boulevard, there are shops of small industrial area. Mersin State Hospital is situated on the south side of the boulevard.

Then the avenue turns to south for 2.8 km (1.7 mi), where it is the boundary line between the two second level municipalities of Mersin namely, Akdeniz and Toroslar.

After crossing Müftü River, it runs through Yenişehir second level municipality and it intersects with İsmet İnönü Boulevard by an interchange, from where it directs to southwest for 5.4 km (3.4 mi). This portion is mostly composed of residential quarters of the city. Another important avenue, the Adnan Menderes Boulevard runs parallel to GMK Boulevard about 200 m (660 ft) south of it. A part of Mersin University's facilities is between the two boulevards.

Beyond the university, the boulevard continues for another 4.8 km (3.0 mi) in Mezitli second level municipality before merging to D-400.

== History ==
In the 1950s, the boulevard was constructed to the northwest of the city as a bypass road to ease the traffic of the state highway. But after the construction of the boulevard, the population of the city increased about ten-fold, and many new quarters appeared to the north of the boulevard. Thus the boulevard as well as two more recent boulevards to the north became intracity boulevards. Now, the GMK Boulevard with heavy traffic is one of the main arterial roads of Mersin.
