= Refah tragedy =

1941 maritime disaster in Turkey

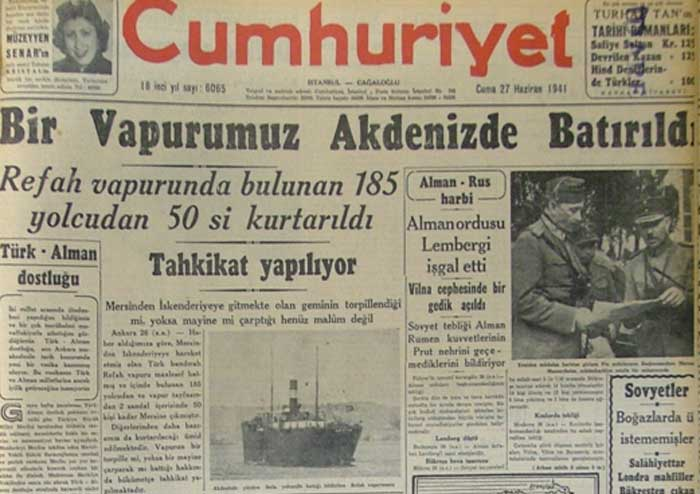
Refah tragedy in the daily newspaper Cumhuriyet on 27 June 1941

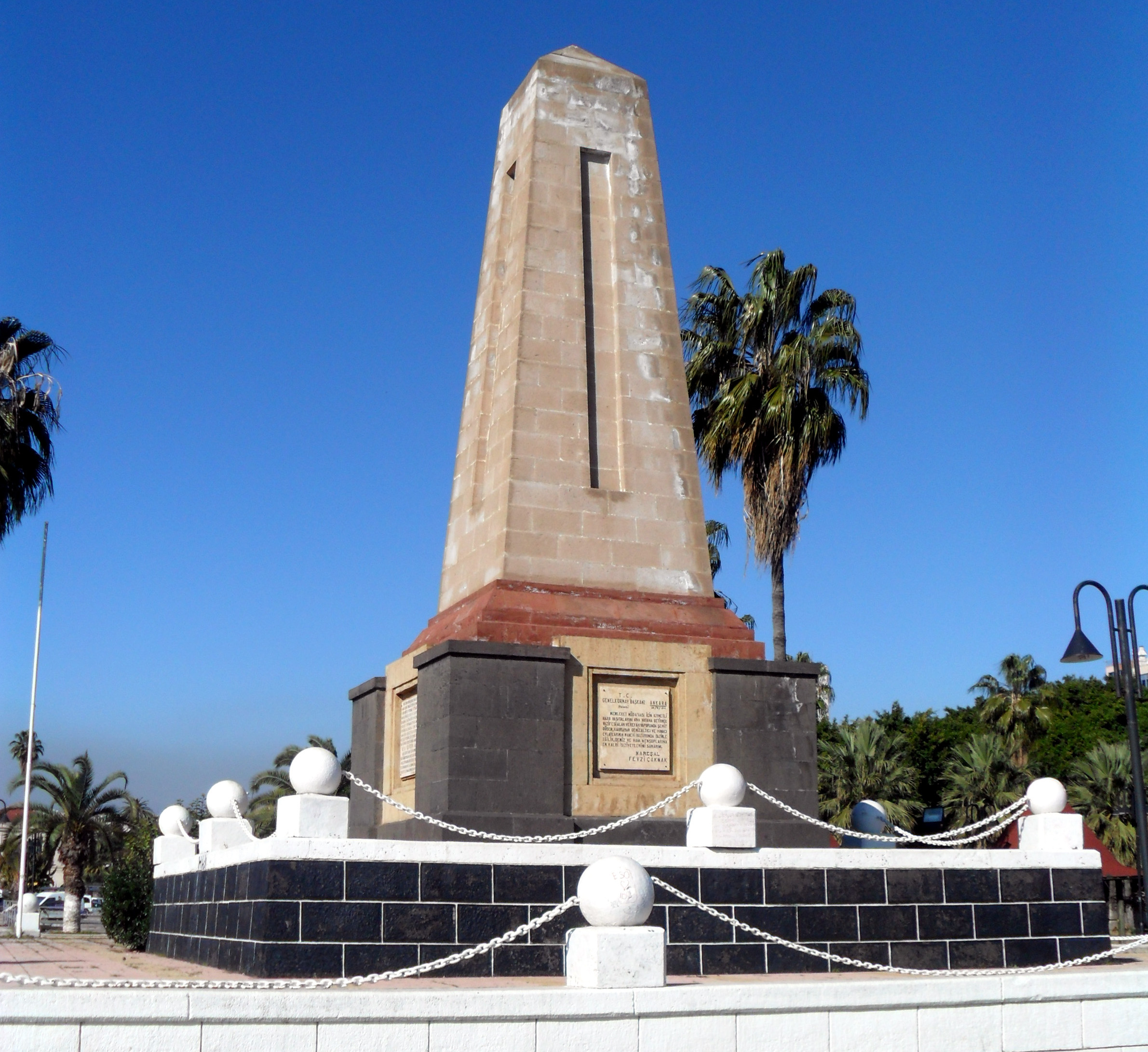
Refah monument from the south (The inscription is the message of Fevzi Çakmak, the chief of general staff)

The Refah tragedy (Turkish: Refah faciası) was a maritime disaster that took place during World War II, in June 1941, when the cargo steamer Refah of neutral Turkey, carrying Turkish military personnel from Mersin in Turkey to Port Said, Egypt, was sunk in eastern Mediterranean waters by a torpedo fired from an unidentified submarine. Of the 200 passengers and crew aboard, only 32 survived.

== Background ==
Turkey remained neutral until the final year of World War II, but its proximity to the fighting made it decide to mobilize a large army in case the country came under attack. In the early stages of the war, the Turkish government had already ordered four submarines, four destroyers, twelve landing craft and aircraft for four flights from the United Kingdom.

Delivery was delayed because of wartime difficulties. Nevertheless, the British decided to make the submarines and aircraft available out of fear of a possible pro-German tendency among the Turkish statesmen. It was planned that both the delivery and the training of the military personnel would take place in the United Kingdom. The direct air route from Turkey to the United Kingdom would have meant travelling over Nazi German-controlled Europe and so it was decided to go by sea to Egypt, then under British control, and then to the United Kingdom by air. The British demanded for the Turkish mission to arrive by 25 June in Port Said to join a British convoy going home.

== Ship ==
The Turkish government chartered the steamer Refah, a cargo ship owned by the Berzilay & Benjamen Company. She was built in 1901 at Sunderland, England, and sailed under the name Perseveranza until renamed Refah (literally: Prosperity) in 1931 by the Turkish owner. The 3,805-ton vessel was 102.20 m (335 ft 4 in) long with 14.80 m (48 ft 7 in) beam and 7.00 m (23 ft 0 in) draught, and 8.5-knot (15.7 km/h; 9.8 mph) maximum speed. The ship departed from Istanbul on 16 June 1941 and arrived five days later in the southeastern Turkish port of Mersin.

Commander Zeki Işın, appointed leader of the mission, inspected the 40-year-old, coal cargo vessel and reported his findings to the authorities in Ankara: the ship had insufficient cabins, beds and toilets for the estimated 170 passengers she was expected to carry, and only two lifeboats were available, each for 24 people. He concluded that the cargo ship was not suitable for a journey of this kind across the Mediterranean Sea.

The ship underwent some minor modifications in great haste before the journey. She was fitted with additional toilets, cabins and beds brought from the naval school in Mersin. Turkish colours were painted on both sides of the steamer's hull and also on the weather deck. In order to signal her identity as a neutral country's vessel even in the night, she was brightly lit.

== Unexpected political developments ==
On 18 June 1941, Nazi Germany and Turkey signed the German–Turkish Treaty of Friendship that followed an invitation by Adolf Hitler with his letter from 4 March 1941 to the Turkish president İsmet İnönü. Meanwhile, Nazi German troops had already invaded the entire Balkans and stood on Turkey's doorstep. While this pact angered the British government, Nazi Germany, its allies and Finland started an offensive (Operation Barbarossa) on 22 June against the Soviet Union, relying on its secure southern front.

== Incident ==
The Turkish military mission came to 171 people, comprising 19 Turkish Navy officers, 72 petty officers, 58 seamen, 20 Turkish Air Force Academy cadets and two civilians. The ship had 28 crew members. A British liaison officer boarded the vessel immediately before her departure, who gave the ship's captain İzzet Dalgakıran the necessary route details.

On 23 June at 17:30 hours local time, Refah weighed anchor, and sailed towards Port Said in eastern Mediterranean waters with a total of 200 people aboard. Turkey was neutral so the voyage was considered safe and the steamer was not escorted by warships.

Around at 22:30 hours, while the passengers were eating their rations throughout the ship, an explosion occurred as the ship was about 10 nautical miles (19 km; 12 mi) east off the coast of Cyprus. She was hit by a torpedo fired from an unidentified submarine. The vessel flooded and began to sink.

According to the survivors, who later recounted the subsequent events, one of the lifeboats fell into the sea with people sleeping inside. The ship's electrical system went dead and her radio became disabled, so that no distress call could be transmitted. Some passengers fell and some jumped into the water. Lieutenant Nevzat Erül came alongside the second lifeboat with a pistol in his hand and directed a rescue operation for 24 passengers. However, the lifeboat could not be launched because the davit did not operate. Meanwhile, some people already in the water climbed up the ship, as they did not expect her to sink immediately. People tried to dismount wooden toilet doors and hold covers for use as rafts. Muhittin Darga, one of the survivors, said in an interview given in 1983 that they waited aboard the sinking ship until 02:00 hours, and then jumped into the lifeboat; the ship was so low in the water at this point that the lifeboat was touching the surface. Around four hours after the explosion, the ship snapped in two pieces and went down.

Darga added that the British officer wearing a lifejacket could not get into the lifeboat. He learned later that the British officer was missing. Most of the people who jumped into the sea drowned. The people in the lifeboat rescued three or four victims from the sea. They used a lifeboat's oar as a mast and a blanket as a sail. Although only 10 nautical miles away from Cyprus, a south wind drove them to the Turkish coast. Those clinging to the makeshift rafts were rescued by boats that came along, while others who left their rafts to swim away drowned. 28 people in the lifeboat landed after 20 hours on the Turkish coast near Karataş lighthouse.

Only then did the tragedy become known. Military aircraft and motorboats were immediately deployed to the scene. A search was conducted all day long. However, only four more survivors could be rescued. Of the 200 people aboard, the disaster claimed the lives of 168 people in total, while only 32 survived.

== Aftermath and speculations ==
There are a number of speculations on who sunk Refah.

Turkey had declared its neutrality in the war eleven times before, and no country claimed responsibility for the attack on the Turkish ship. Britain's ambassador to Turkey, Sir Hughe Knatchbull-Hugessen, stated that the attack was made by a Nazi German or Italian submarine operating in the area. The allegation was denied by the Nazi German news agency DNB. Another assertion that the Refah was sunk by a French warship, which mistook her for an Egyptian vessel, could not be verified because the passengers did not see any warship. Finally, the British were accused, either because they were not willing to deliver the military equipment ordered by Turkey, or to trigger Turkey's involvement in the war on the side of the Allies.

According to Ret. Group Captain Haydar Gürsan, one of the survivors, the ship was torpedoed twice by a French submarine. French reconnaissance aircraft flew over the scene the next morning without reporting the incident to Turkish authorities. He added that a French officer told him in Beirut that the ship was sunk by the French, and the information was also recorded by military intelligence. After reports about Mediterranean marine activities poured in, it became clear that the anonymous submarine belonged to Vichy France. In the summer of 1941, forces of Free France and Vichy France were fighting over Syria; one of Vichy France's submarines mistook Refah for a vessel of Free France. Later, although not officially announced, it is believed that French government handed over two of her warships to Turkey as compensation.

However, disclosed documents from Italian and German archives support an alternative story. A report published by the Italian Navy gives coordinates where the Italian submarine Ondina attacked vessels. The site of Refah's sinking matches that information. The latest release by the Italian Naval Ministry admitted the sinking. Refah was sunk by an Italian submarine named Ondina under the command of Corrado Dal Pozzo at location indicated as (36.08N-34.44E) in Italian naval records. Ondina and Italian Naval records show the submarine fired a torpedo.

Ondina was also sunk a year later by the warships English Protea, HMSAS Southern Maid and Walrus warplanes near Cyprus At (34-35 N, 34-56 E) on 11 July 1942. However, the command of Ondina was under Lieutenant Gabriele Adolfi at that time. The Italian sailors from Ondina were recovered by the warships.

== Political consequences and compensation ==
After the disaster became generally known, discussions in the Turkish parliament led to the opening of an investigation into the case. Minister of Transport Cevdet Kerim İncedayı and Minister of National Defence Saffet Arıkan resigned from the cabinet on 12 November 1941. The parliamentary investigation, concluded on 18 December found these ministers free of guilt. A further investigation found the responsible civil servants not guilty.

The Turkish government paid 4,000 Turkish lira (TL) in compensation to each legal inheritor of the people killed in the disaster, 800 TL to each naval officer, 400 TL to each petty officer and cadet, and 100 TL to each seaman who survived the incident.

== Commemoration ==
In remembrance of the victims of the tragedy, a monument was erected in the Atatürk Park of Mersin, which is situated next to the Port of Mersin.
