= Mersin Lighthouse =

Lighthouse in Mersin, Turkey

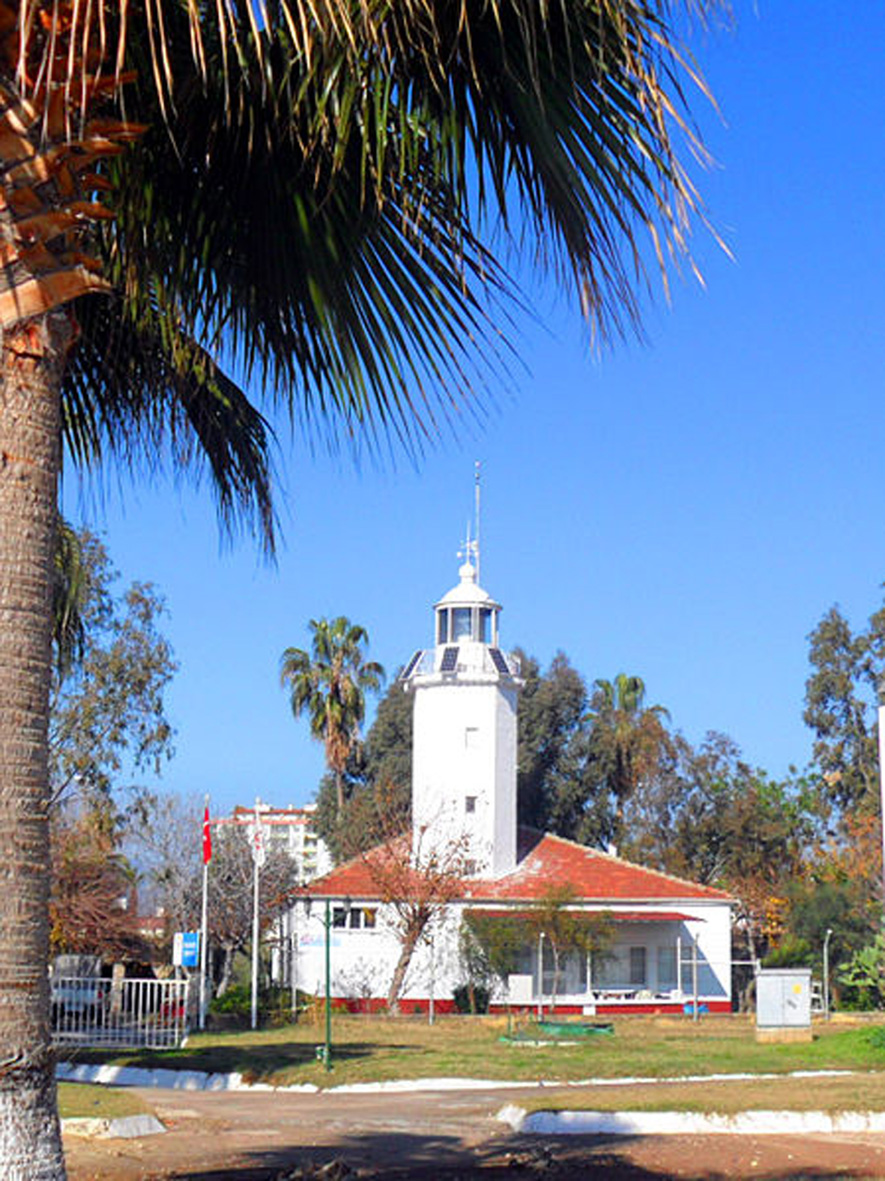
- Mersin Lighthouse from the south
- Location: Mersin; Turkey
- Coordinates: 36°47′03″N 34°37′06″E

Tower
- Constructed: 1865 (first)
- Construction: masonry tower
- Height: 15 m (49 ft)
- Shape: octagonal tower with balcony and lantern rising from the keeper's house
- Markings: white tower and lantern with a red band around the keeper's house
- Operator: Directorate General of Coastal Safety

Light
- First lit: 1883 (current)
- Focal height: 16 m (52 ft)
- Range: 15 nmi (28 km)
- Characteristic: Fl.(3) W 10s.

Mersin Feneri (The Mersin Lighthouse) is located at the Mediterranean coast in the city of Mersin, Turkey.

== Geography ==
Mersin lighthouse is within the Mersin urban fabric and is situated at the west of the mouth of Efrenk River. İsmet İnönü Boulevard is to the north of the lighthouse. It is surrounded by walking tracks and on the west there is a group of restaurants. The harbor lies to the east and the lighthouse is approximately 2 km (1.2 mi) west of harbor entrance. Since the dominant wind in Mersin area is lodos (from south west) the lighthouse provides service to the vessels approaching from the west as it is usually the case.

== History ==
The lighthouse was built in 1865, and reconstructed in 1955. It was bought by the Republic of Turkey, and now it is operated by Directorate General of Coastal Safety (Turkish: Kıyı Emniyeti Genel Müdürlüğü).

== Technical details ==
The building is an octagonal cylindrical masonry tower with lantern and gallery. Adjacent to the tower, there is a keeper's house. Its focal plane is 16 m (52 ft). It flashes three times white every ten seconds. In the past the light source was kerosene and acetylene. Currently, it is lit by a halogen lamp. The range of visibility is about 15 nmi (28 km). Mersin lighthouse is listed in Turkey under the code "TUR-043".

== See also ==
- List of lighthouses in Turkey
