= Huzurkent =

Town in Mersin Province, Turkey

Coordinates: 36°53′N 34°49′E

Huzurkent is a former municipality in Mersin Province, Turkey. In 2008 the municipality was abolished and absorbed into the municipality Akdeniz within the new district Akdeniz, which was created from part of the former central district of Mersin.

== Geography ==
Huzurkent is situated in the Çukurova (ancient Cicilia) plains and about 10 kilometres (6.2 mi) north of the Mediterranean coast. The town has a 3,000 metres (9,800 ft) sandy beach at the coast. It is planned to create a Touristic center in this beach. It is on the highway connecting Mersin to Tarsus. Distance to Tarsus is 9 kilometres (5.6 mi) and to Mersin is 19 kilometres (12 mi). The population of the municipality was 12,553 as of 2007.

== History ==
The town was founded in 1969 by merging three villages which were almost ruined by the big flood disaster of 1968. The town quickly flourished as the main town and municipality in the vicinity of industrial estates between Mersin and Tarsus.

== Economy ==
Huzurkent is one of the affluent towns of Mersin Province. Situated in a fertile plain, main products are fresh fruits and vegetables. Annual harvest festivals are held in the springs. Some residents also work in the nearby factories.
