= Iğdır, Mersin =

Iğdır
- Neighbourhood
- Location in Turkey
- Coordinates: 36°54′N 34°39′E
- Country: Turkey
- Province: Mersin
- District: Akdeniz
- Elevation: 181 m (594 ft)
- Population (2022): 1,216
- Time zone: UTC+3 (TRT)

Iğdır is a neighbourhood in the municipality and district of Akdeniz, Mersin Province, Turkey. Its population is 1,216 (2022). It is located to the north of the city, and the distance between the village and the city is about 12 kilometres (7.5 mi).
