= Yeşilova, Mersin =

Yeşilova
- Neighbourhood
- Location in Turkey
- Coordinates: 36°55′N 34°38′E
- Country: Turkey
- Province: Mersin
- District: Akdeniz
- Elevation: 175 m (574 ft)
- Population (2022): 225
- Time zone: UTC+3 (TRT)
- Postal code: 33261
- Area code: 0324

Yeşilova is a neighbourhood in the municipality and district of Akdeniz, Mersin Province, Turkey. Its population is 225 (2022). It is a neighbourhood in Çukurova (Cilicia) plains. The village produces fruits and vegetables, especially grapes.
