= Yanpar =

Yanpar Gökkuşağı
- Neighbourhood
- Location in Turkey
- Coordinates: 36°55′N 34°43′E
- Country: Turkey
- Province: Mersin
- District: Akdeniz
- Elevation: 135 m (443 ft)
- Population (2022): 712
- Time zone: UTC+3 (TRT)
- Postal code: 33261
- Area code: 0324

Yanpar (also known as Gökkuşağı) is a neighbourhood in the municipality and district of Akdeniz, Mersin Province, Turkey. Its population is 712 (2022). It is situated just south of the Çukurova motorway. The distance to Mersin is 18 kilometres (11 mi). The name of the village refers to the Yanpar tribe. Although there are no references to this tribe in historical records, according to the village website, Yanpar is the original name of the Yaparlu tribe of the historical records. Yanpar tribe is a Turkmen tribe that migrated from Central Anatolia to the present area during the short Egyptian rule in the 1830s.
