= Mersin Urban History Museum =

Museum in Mersin, Turkey

- Mersin Kent Tarihi Müzesi
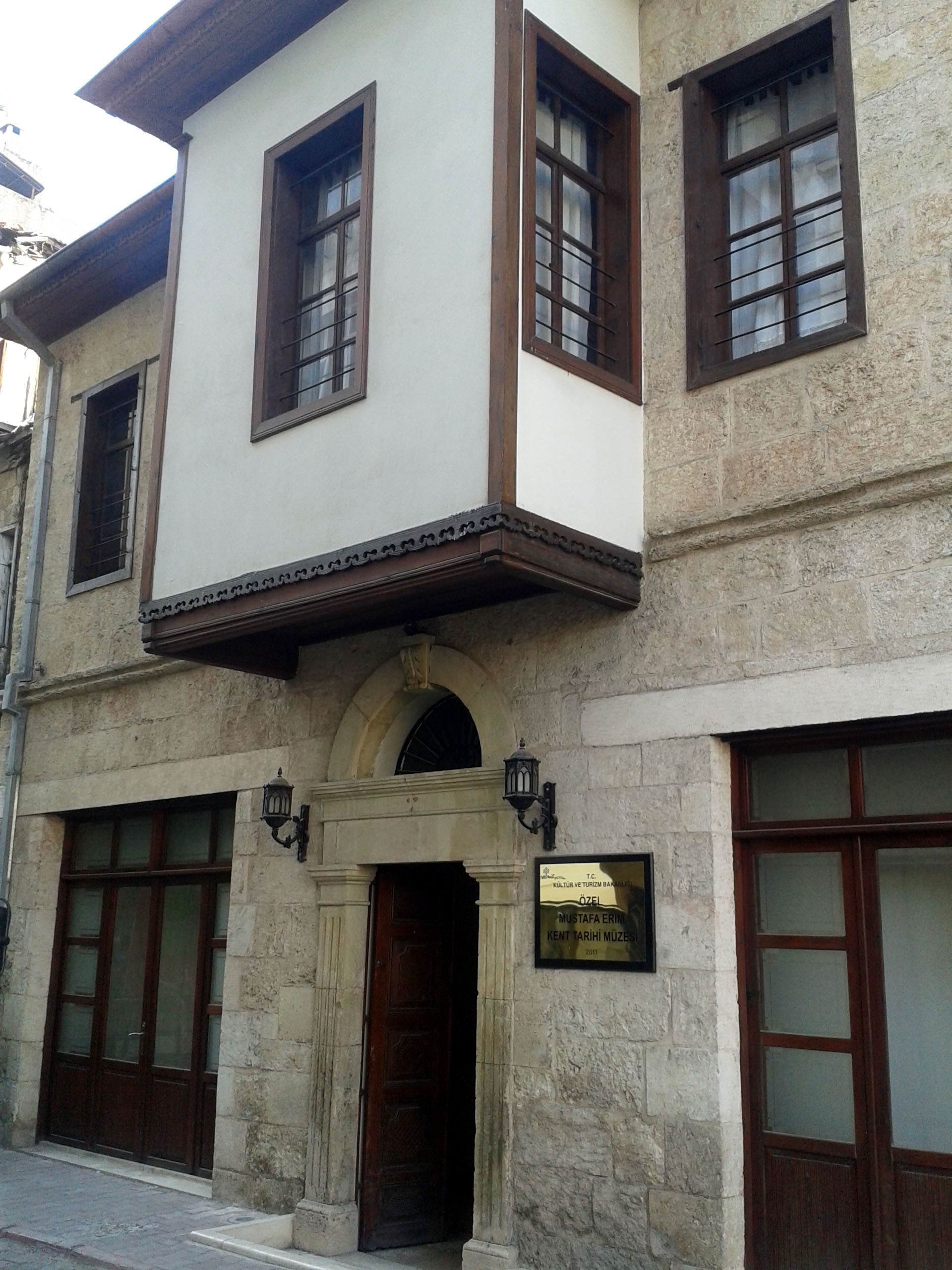
- Mersin Urban History Museum entrance

- Mersin Urban History Museum
- Established: 2010; 16 years ago
- Location: 5219 sok. Akdeniz, Mersin, Turkey
- Coordinates: 36°48′00″N 34°37′42″E
- Type: Urban
- Owner: Mustafa Erim
- Website: Mersin Urban History Museum

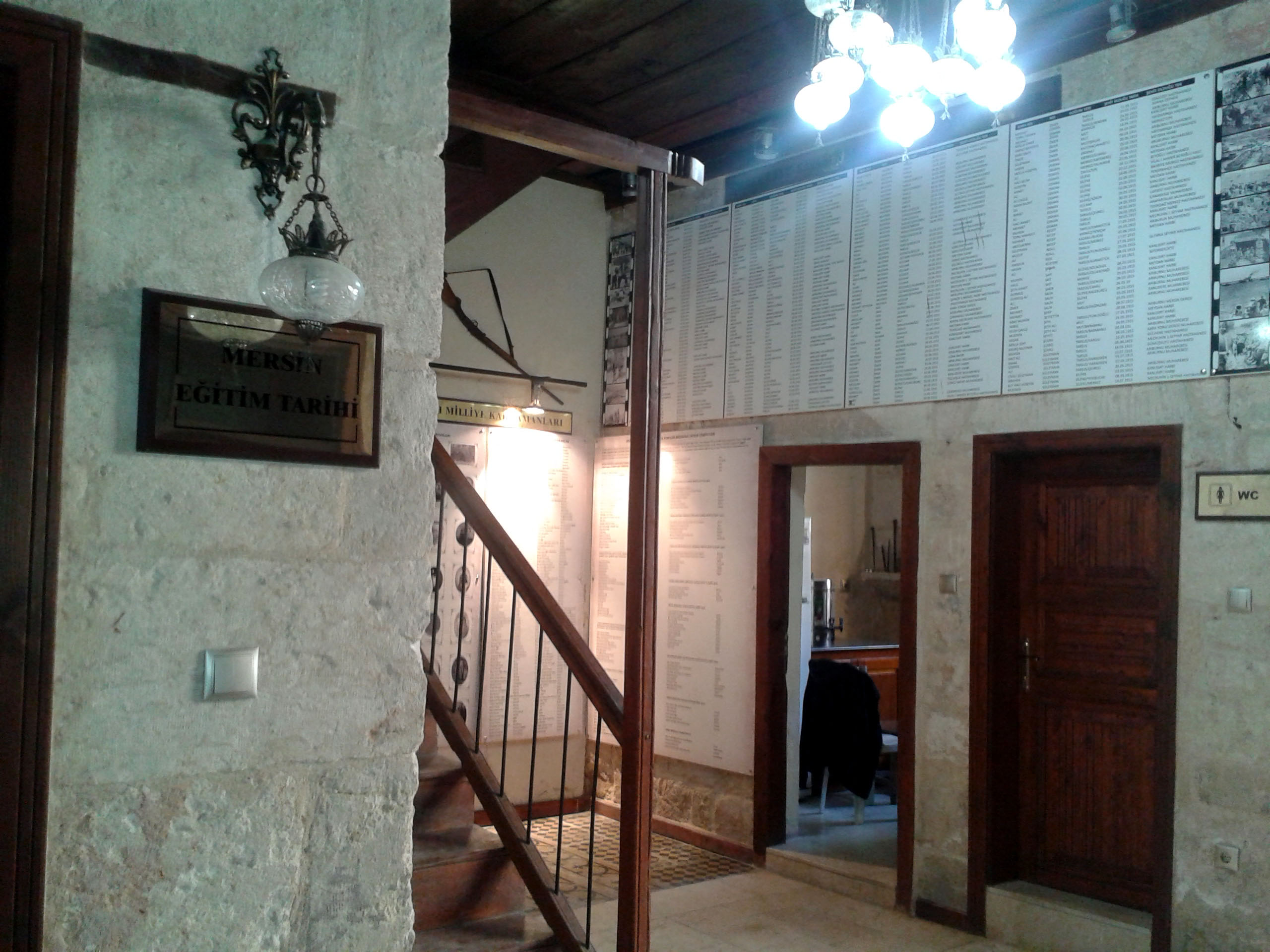
Mersin Urban History Museum interior, Turkey

Mersin Urban History Museum (Turkish: Mersin Kent Tarihi Müzesi) is a private museum in Mersin, Turkey.

== Location and the History ==
The museum at 36°48′00″N 34°37′42″E is in Akdeniz secondary municipality of Mersin, ant it lies about 450 metres (1,480 ft) from the Mediterranean Sea. It is a restored 150 year-old house with a prominent bay window.

The museum building was restored and opened by Mustafa Erim on 4 September 2010.

== Sections in the museum ==
The exhibits in the museum are the following:

- Atatürk in Mersin: photographs of Atatürk (founder of Turkey) during his visits to Mersin.
- Library about Mersin
- Yümüktepe: photographs and documents about the 9,000-yr. old tumulus which is situated within the city borders.
- Education in Mersin: historical documents collected from 70 schools in Mersin
- Castles in Mersin Province: posters and photos of the castles in Mersin Province (see Mersin Archaeology). Although the museum is basically an urban history museum this section includes castles in the greater area.
- Notable Mersin citizens (see Notable People)
- Liberation of Mersin: Opposition to French occupation in Mersin during the Turkish War of Independence
- Mosques and Churches (including inactive ones) in Mersin Province
- Urban History of Mersin (see History)

The museum has also a conference room.
