= Hebilli =

- Neighbourhood
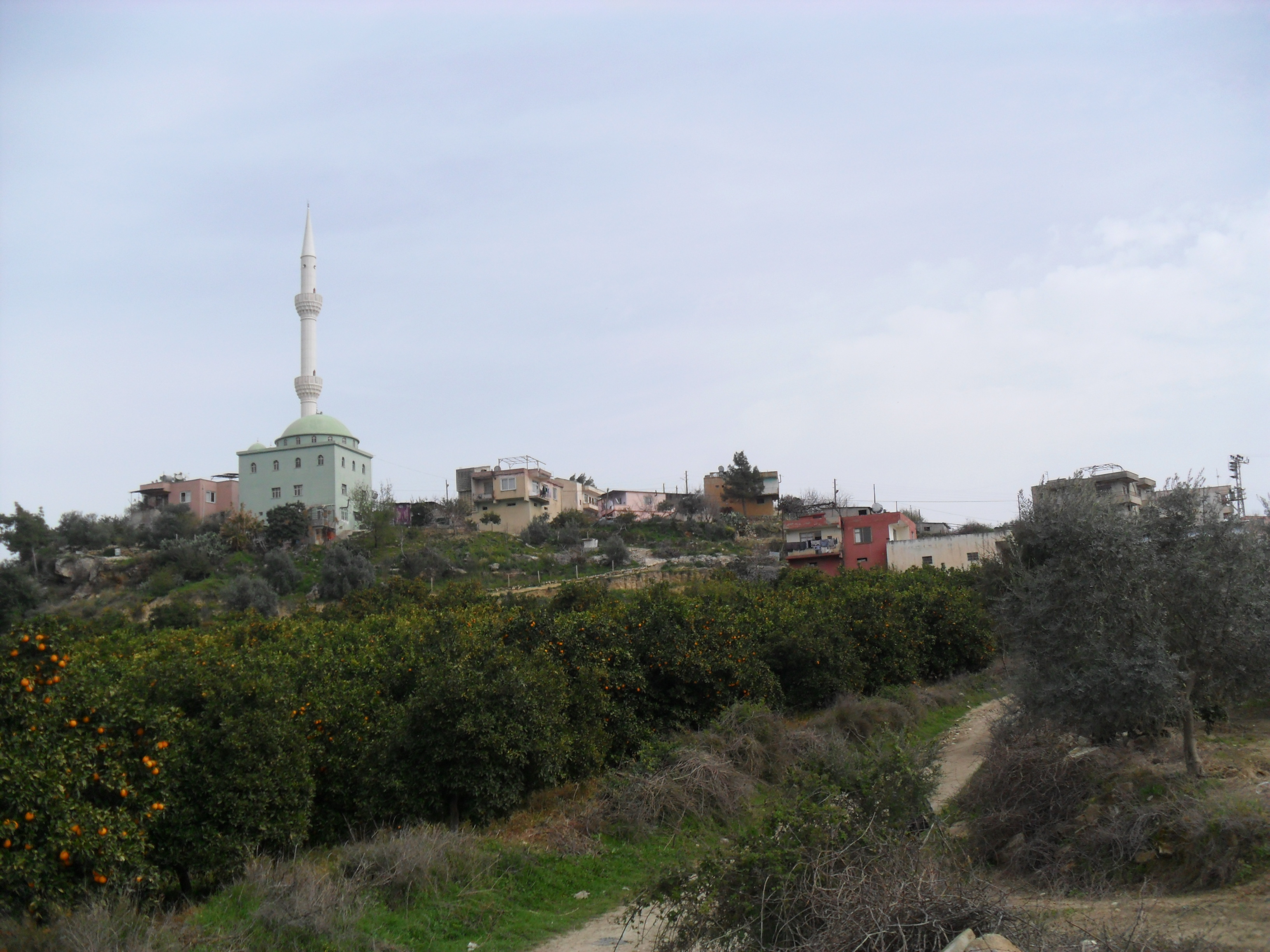

- Location within Turkey
- Coordinates: 36°55′N 34°40′E
- Country: Turkey
- Province: Mersin
- District: Akdeniz
- Elevation: 175 m (574 ft)
- Population (2022): 433
- Time zone: UTC+3 (TRT)
- Postal code: 33261
- Area code: 0324

Hebilli is a neighbourhood in the municipality and district of Akdeniz, Mersin Province, Turkey. Its population is 433 (2022). It is situated to the north of Çukurova Motorway in Çukurova (Cilicia) plains. The distance to Mersin is 15 kilometres (9.3 mi).

The population of the village is largely composed of descendants of Turkish refugees from the island of Crete (now part of Greece) during the last years of the 19th century. There is an Arabic castle ruin in the village built in the middle ages (see Hebilli Castle). The main economic activity of the village is citrus farming.

== Climate ==
The climate in Hebilli is warm and temperate. There is more rainfall in the winter than in the summer in Hebilli. The climate is classified as Mediterranean (Csa) by the Köppen-Geiger system. The average annual temperature is 18.3 °C in Hebilli. The warmest temperatures occur in August, averaging 27.4 °C, whereas the coldest month is January, with temperatures averaging 9.3 °C. Precipitation averages 699 mm.
