= Hebilli Castle =

- Mersin Province, Turkey
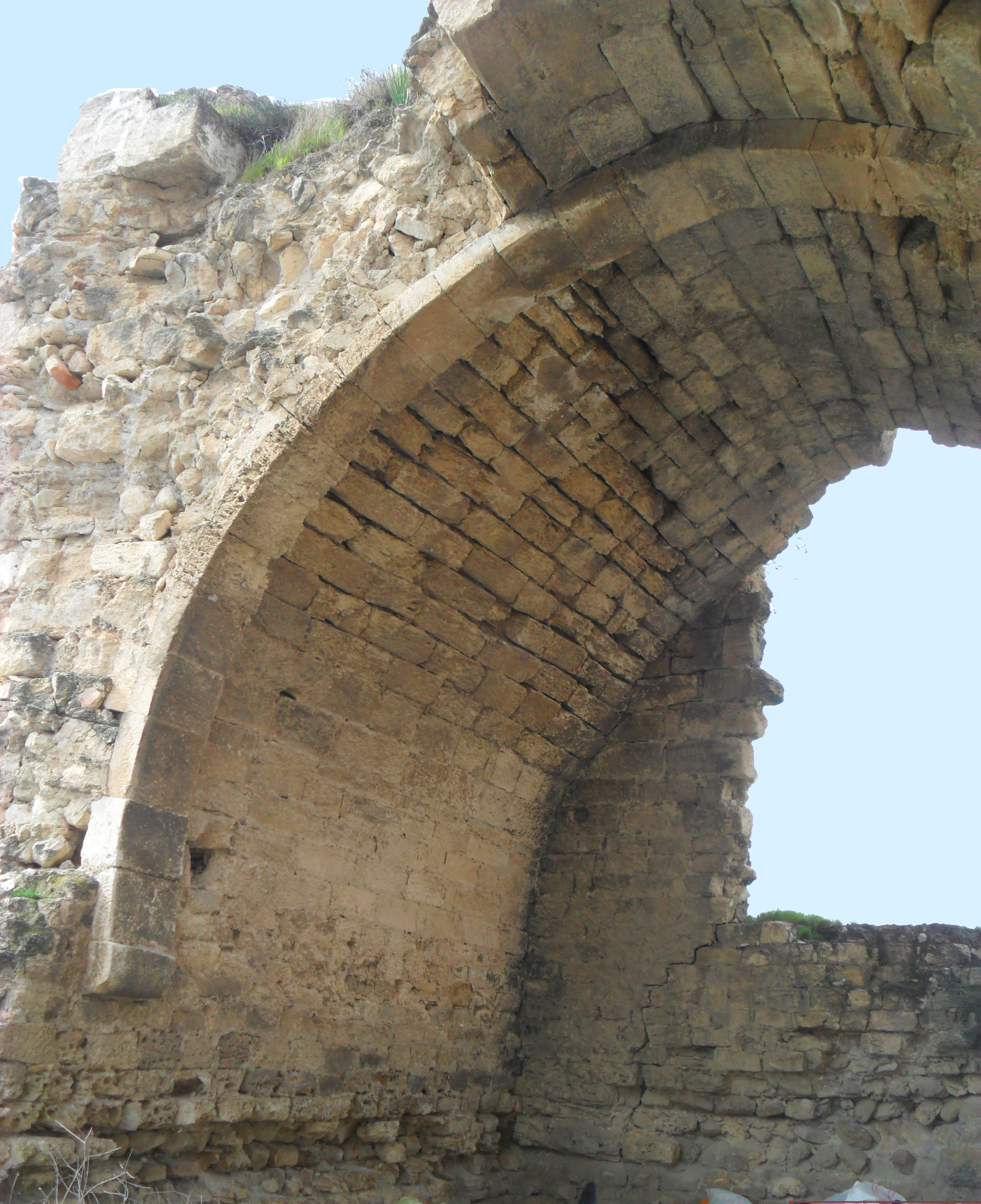
- To east

Site information
- Type: Castle
- Open to the public: Yes
- Condition: Ruined

Location
- Coordinates: 36°55′27″N 34°40′07″E

Site history
- Built by: Caliphate
- Demolished: Most of it

Hebilli Castle is a ruined castle in Mersin Province, Turkey.

== Location ==
The castle ruin is situated in Hebilli village which is now a suburb of Mersin at 36°55′27″N 34°40′07″E. Its distance to Mersin city center is 18 kilometres (11 mi).

== History ==
The castle was built by an Arabic commander named Kalah Habellieh in the 7th century. The name of the castle, as well as the village, refers to its commissioner.

== The building ==
The two-storey castle is a small castle with outer dimensions 14 m × 20 m (46 ft × 66 ft). It was probably an observation castle. The outer walls were made of face stone while the inner walls were of rubble stone.
