= Parmakkurdu =

- Neighbourhood
- Location in Turkey
- Coordinates: 36°58′N 34°40′E
- Country: Turkey
- Province: Mersin
- District: Akdeniz
- Elevation: 460 m (1,510 ft)
- Population (2022): 1,019
- Time zone: UTC+3 (TRT)

Parmakkurdu is a neighbourhood in the municipality and district of Akdeniz, Mersin Province, Turkey. Its population is 1,019 (2022). It is situated on the southern slopes of the Taurus Mountains. Its distance to the city is about 20 kilometres (12 mi).
