= Puğkaracadağ =

- Neighbourhood
- Location in Turkey
- Coordinates: 36°57′N 34°42′E
- Country: Turkey
- Province: Mersin
- District: Akdeniz
- Elevation: 155 m (509 ft)
- Population (2022): 601
- Time zone: UTC+3 (TRT)
- Postal code: 33261
- Area code: 0324

Puğkaracadağ is a neighbourhood in the municipality and district of Akdeniz, Mersin Province, Turkey. Its population is 601 (2022). The village is situated on the north of the Çukurova motorway. The Deliçay creek is to the west of the village. The village's distance to Mersin is about 20 kilometres (12 mi).
