= Camili, Mersin =

Camili
- Neighbourhood
- Location in Turkey
- Coordinates: 36°53′N 34°37′E
- Country: Turkey
- Province: Mersin
- District: Akdeniz
- Elevation: 234 m (768 ft)
- Population (2022): 977
- Time zone: UTC+3 (TRT)

Camili is a neighbourhood in the municipality and district of Akdeniz, Mersin Province, Turkey. Its population is 977 (2022). The village is located northeast of the city center.
