= Esenli =

- Neighbourhood
- Location in Turkey
- Coordinates: 36°56′N 34°39′E
- Country: Turkey
- Province: Mersin
- District: Akdeniz
- Elevation: 245 m (804 ft)
- Population (2022): 398
- Time zone: UTC+3 (TRT)
- Postal code: 33261
- Area code: 0324

Esenli is a neighbourhood in the municipality and district of Akdeniz, Mersin Province, Turkey. Its population is 398 (2022). It is a neighbourhood in Çukurova (Cilicia) plains. The distance to Mersin is 22 kilometres (14 mi).

The village produces fruits and vegetables, especially grapes. A location at the east of the village named Çiftezeytin was proposed as one of the storage areas of Mersin city refuse, but the villagers of Esenli opposed to the proposal.
