= Mersin State Art and Sculpture Museum =

Art museum in Turkey

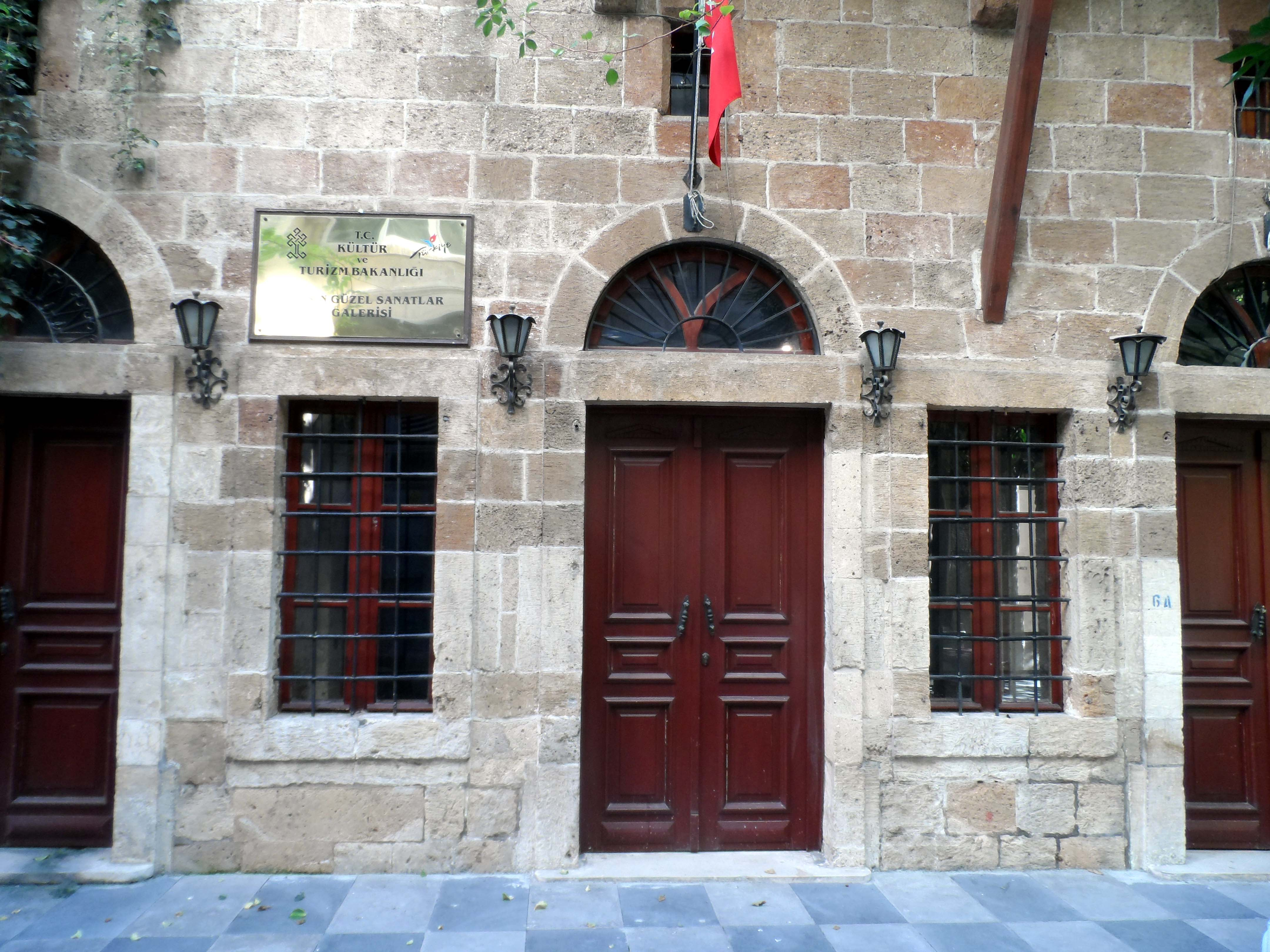

- Location of the museum
- Established: 2002
- Location: Camiişerif mah. 5226 sok., Mersin, Turkey
- Coordinates: 36.7989°N 34.6297°E
- Type: Painting and sculpture

Mersin State Art and Sculpture Museum (Turkish: Mersin Devlet Resim ve Heykel Müzesi) is a museum in Mersin, Turkey. The museum is in the centrum at 36°47′56″N 34°37′47″E. It is in a neighborhood known for galleries and Art Club of İçel.

The construction date of the building is not known. Probably it was an inn for the villagers in the early days of Mersin. There were stables in the ground floor. Later it was converted to a hotel and was purchased by a family from Gülnar ilçe (district). They named the hotel Gülnar Oteli ("Hotel Gülnar"). During the age of modern hotels, Hotel Gülnar was closed and was left alone for about twenty years. With the support of İstemihan Talay, the minister of Culture between 1997-1999, the building was acquired by the government. Following a restoration project, in 2002, it was opened as a state art and sculpture museum. The ground floor is the gallery and the upper floor is reserved for the office and the meeting room.

The construction material of the two storey building is cut stone. Corbels were made by lath and plaster method.
