= Dikilitaş, Mersin =

Dikilitaş
- Neighbourhood
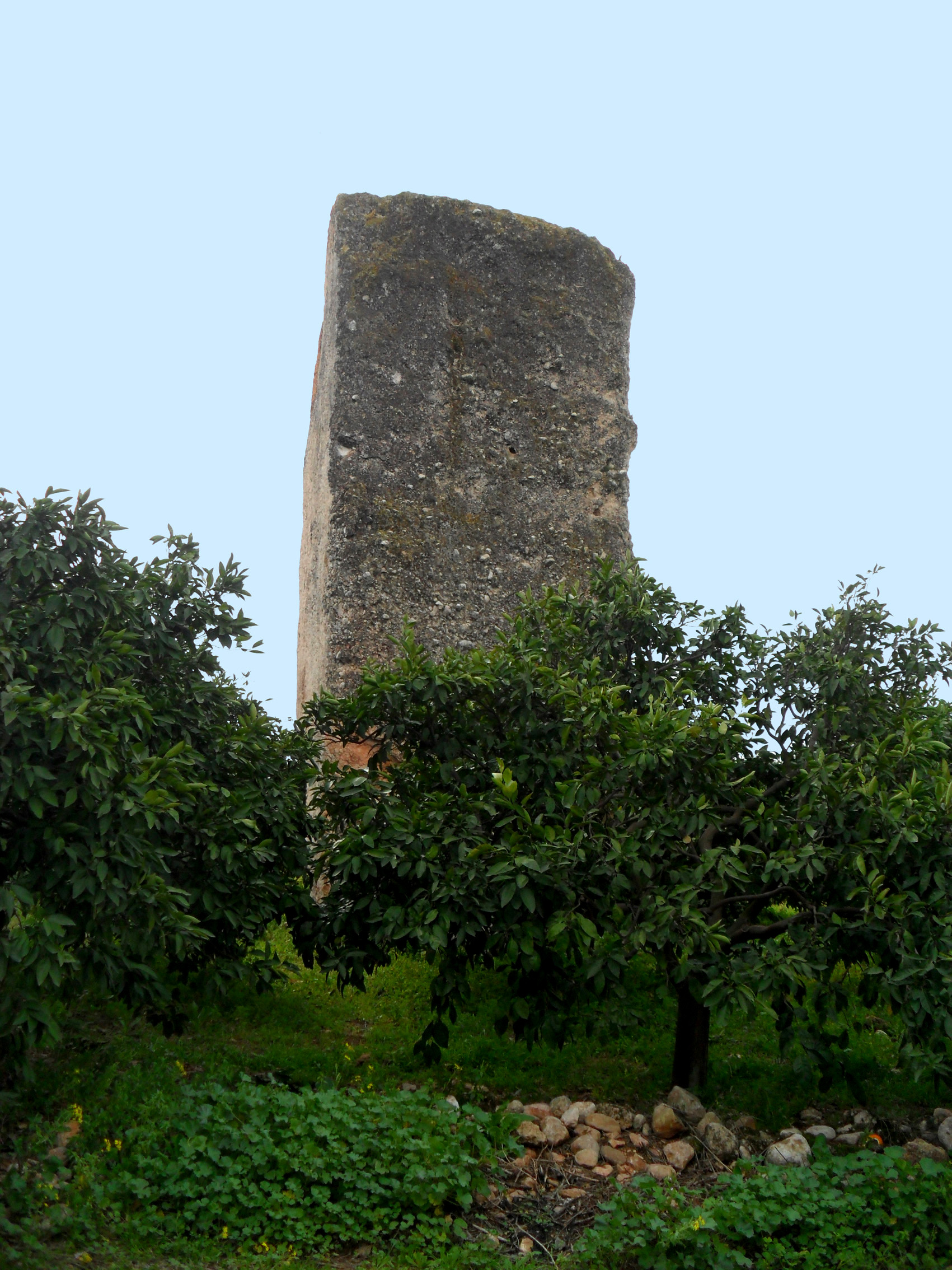
- Dikilitaş monument

- Location within Turkey
- Coordinates: 36°51′46″N 34°39′23″E
- Country: Turkey
- Province: Mersin
- District: Akdeniz
- Population (2022): 1,069
- Time zone: UTC+3 (TRT)

Dikilitaş is a neighbourhood in the municipality and district of Akdeniz, Mersin Province, Turkey. Its population is 1,069 (2022). It takes its name from an ancient Assyrian monument.

== Geography ==
Both the settlement and the monument are in Mersin municipality area. But the monument is secluded in the citrus gardens at about 36°51′04″N 34°39′26″E. The road from the city center to the monument is about 12 kilometres (7.5 mi). The settlement is situated slightly to the north of the monument.

== History ==
In Turkish Dikilitaş means obelisk. Dikilitaş in Mersin was a triumph monument erected by the Assyrian king Sennacherib after his victory against Dorians in 696 BC. When erected, the monument was on the ancient road to Tarsus and probably located in the urban fabric of the ancient city of Anchiale.

== Technical details ==
The monument is actually a rectangular conglomerate 15 metres (49 ft) high, with a base area of 4 × 2 m^{2} (6 × 12 ft^{2}). Its marble cover (and possibly the sculpture on the monument) have since been ruined.

== A legend ==
According to a popular legend there were two struggling families one in Tarsus and the other in Silifke. The families made peace and the daughter of the Tarsus family and the son of the Silifke family got married. But after the bride’s brother died of natural causes in Silifke, the head of the Silifke family travelled to Tarsus to deliver the bad news. However, before reaching to Tarsus he met with the head of the Tarsus family on the spot where the monument is. The monument was erected by the grieving father.
