= Atatürk Park =

Park in Mersin, Turkey

Mersin Atatürk Park
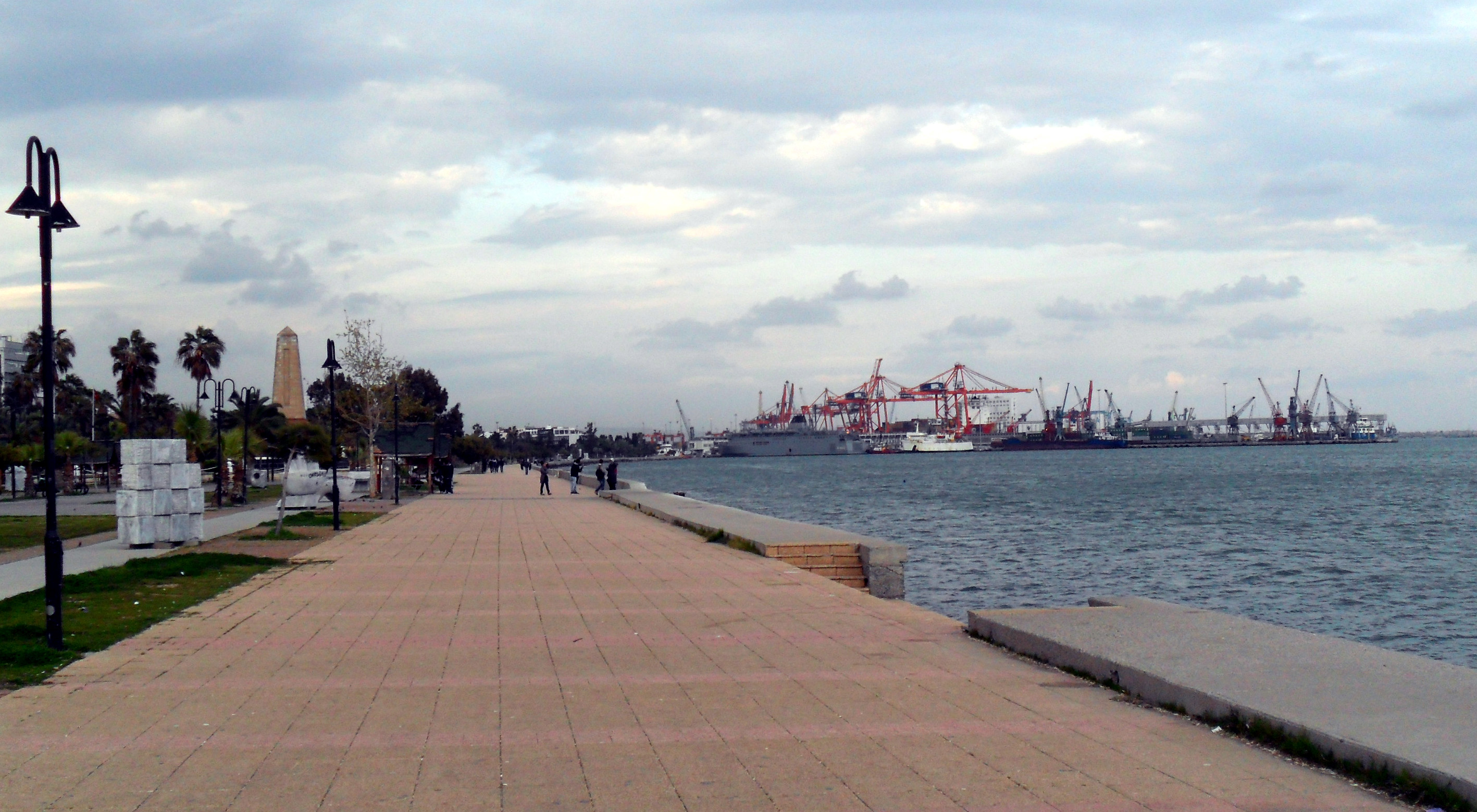
- Mediterranean Sea shore
- Interactive map of Mersin Atatürk Park
- Location: Mersin, Turkey
- Coordinates: 36.79447°N 34.62865°E
- Area: 16 ha (40 acres)

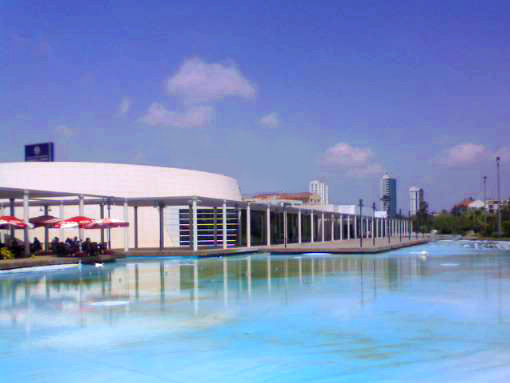
Mersin Congress and Exhibition Center in the park.

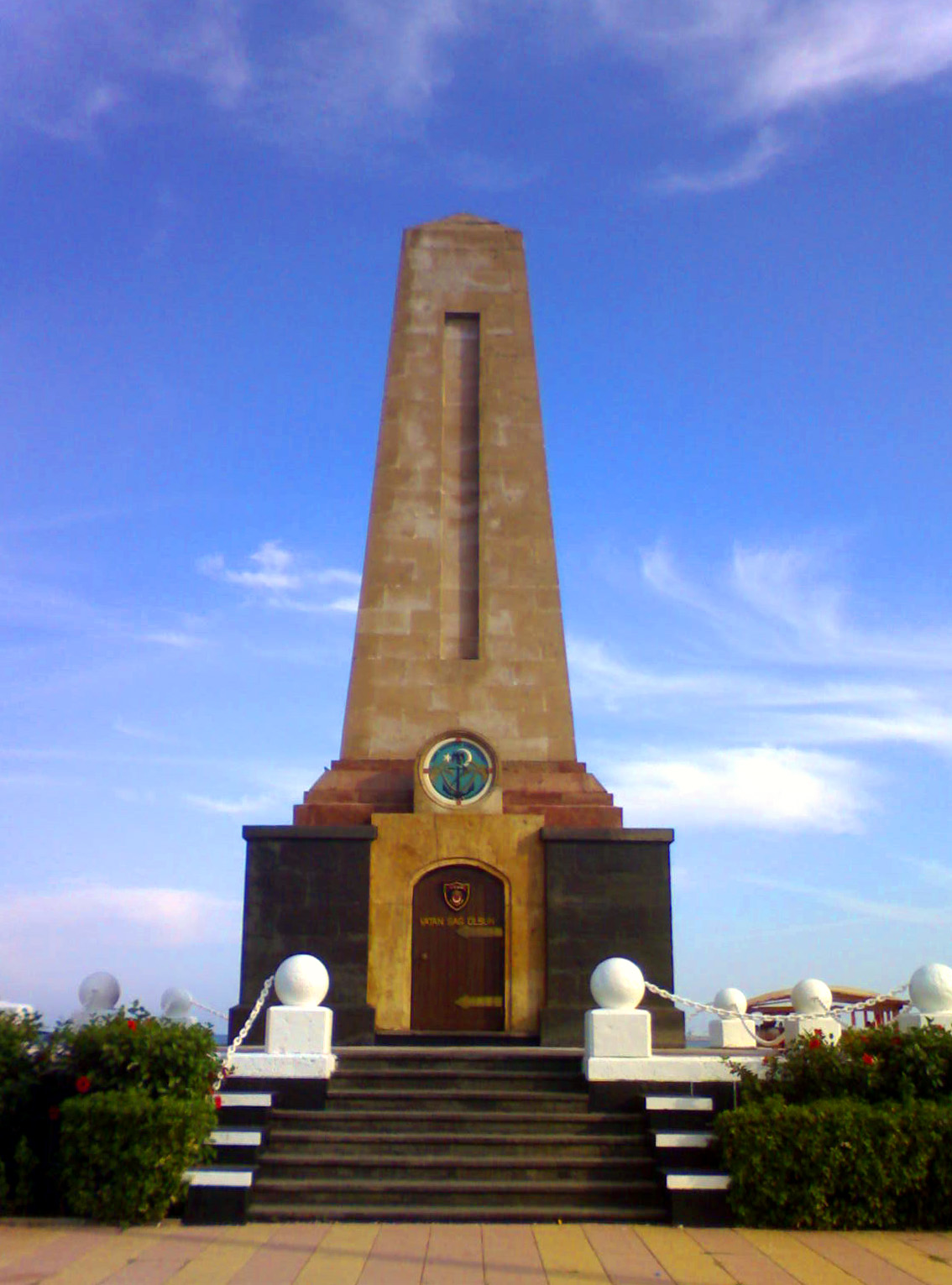
Refah Monument in the park to commemorate the Refah tragedy

Atatürk Park is a public park in Mersin, Turkey.

== Geography ==
The park is a Mediterranean coastal park of Akdeniz district. The longer dimension of the park, which is more than 1,200 m (0.75 mi) lies along the sea coast in north east to south west direction. The total area of the park is 184,772 m^{2} (1,988,870 sq ft). about 16 ha (40 acres). The east of the park is bounded by the harbour facilities and the west is bounded by the old Mersin marina and Efrenk River. The north is bounded by İsmet İnönü Boulevard. Although, coastal park continues 7 km (4.3 mi) to south west beyond Müftü river, the name Atatürk Park is used only for the section between the harbour facilities and the marina.

== History ==
The park is actually the fill area of Mersin Harbor dredging in the 1950s. In the 1970s, the park was designed by the municipality as an area for coffee houses and open air theaters. Up to the 2000s, the park was also reserved for domestic fairs. But after a new fair ground was established about 5 km (3.1 mi) away, the park lost most of its former activities. However, within the scope of a renewal project, the park is now transforming into a culture park.

== Park today ==
The main excursion area is by the sea side. The amateur fishermen's club is at the west, next to the anchoring berth of the fishing boats (old marina). Most of the park is covered by flower beds. At the main entrance, there is a monument called Refah Şehitleri Abidesi (Martyrs of Refah), commemorating the deaths of the sunken ship Refah during the World War II. Ottoman frigate Ertuğrul, another sunken ship of the late 19th century in Japan is also commemorated by this monument.

In 2008, at the north east of the park a 3,160 m^{2} (34,000 ft^{2}) complex of Congress and Exhibition Center (Turkish: Kongre ve Sergi Merkezi) has been established. with conference and performance halls, a pool and related services.
