= Adnan Menderes Boulevard =

Road in Mersin, Turkey

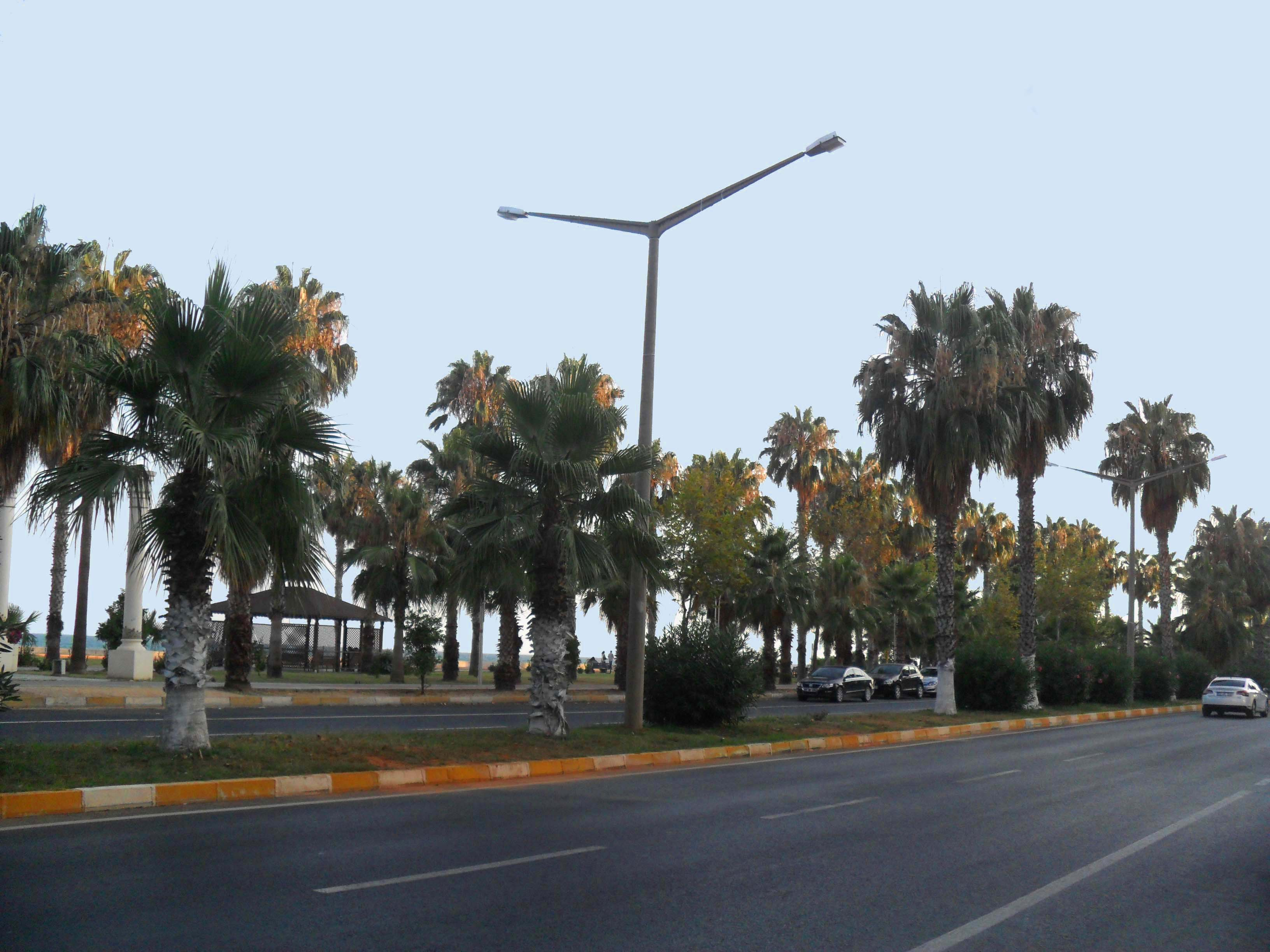
- Palm trees in Adnan Menderes Boulevard
- Interactive map of Adnan Menderes Boulevard
- Native name: Adnan Menderes Bulvarı (Turkish)
- Length: 7 km (4.3 mi)
- Location: Mersin, Turkey
- Coordinates: 36°47′02″N 34°36′44″E
- Major junctions: İsmet İnönü Boulevard

Adnan Menderes Boulevard (Turkish: Adnan Menderes Bulvarı) is a major avenue in Mersin, Turkey. It is named after Adnan Menderes (1899-1961), the prime minister of Turkey between 1950 and 1960.

== Geography ==
The eastern end of the boulevard is a junction at 36°47′02″N 34°36′44″E on İsmet İnönü Boulevard. While İsmet İnönü Boulevard continues to northwest Adnan Menderes Boulevard runs to west and south east. It is parallel to Mediterranean Sea coast, the distance between the coast and the boulevard is about 50 m (160 ft). The area is used for recreation by residents of Mersin. Many coffeehouses as well as parks designed by various football clubs are situated at this recreational area. The Mersin Marina is also situated within this area. The biggest mosque in Mersin, the Muğdat Mosque, Mersin Naval Museum, a number of public schools and a part of Mersin University are on the north side of the boulevard. Gazi Mustafa Kemal Boulevard runs in parallel to Adnan Menderes Boulevard at a distance of about 200 metres (660 ft). The total length of the boulevard is about 7 km (4.3 mi).

== 2013 Mediterranean Games ==
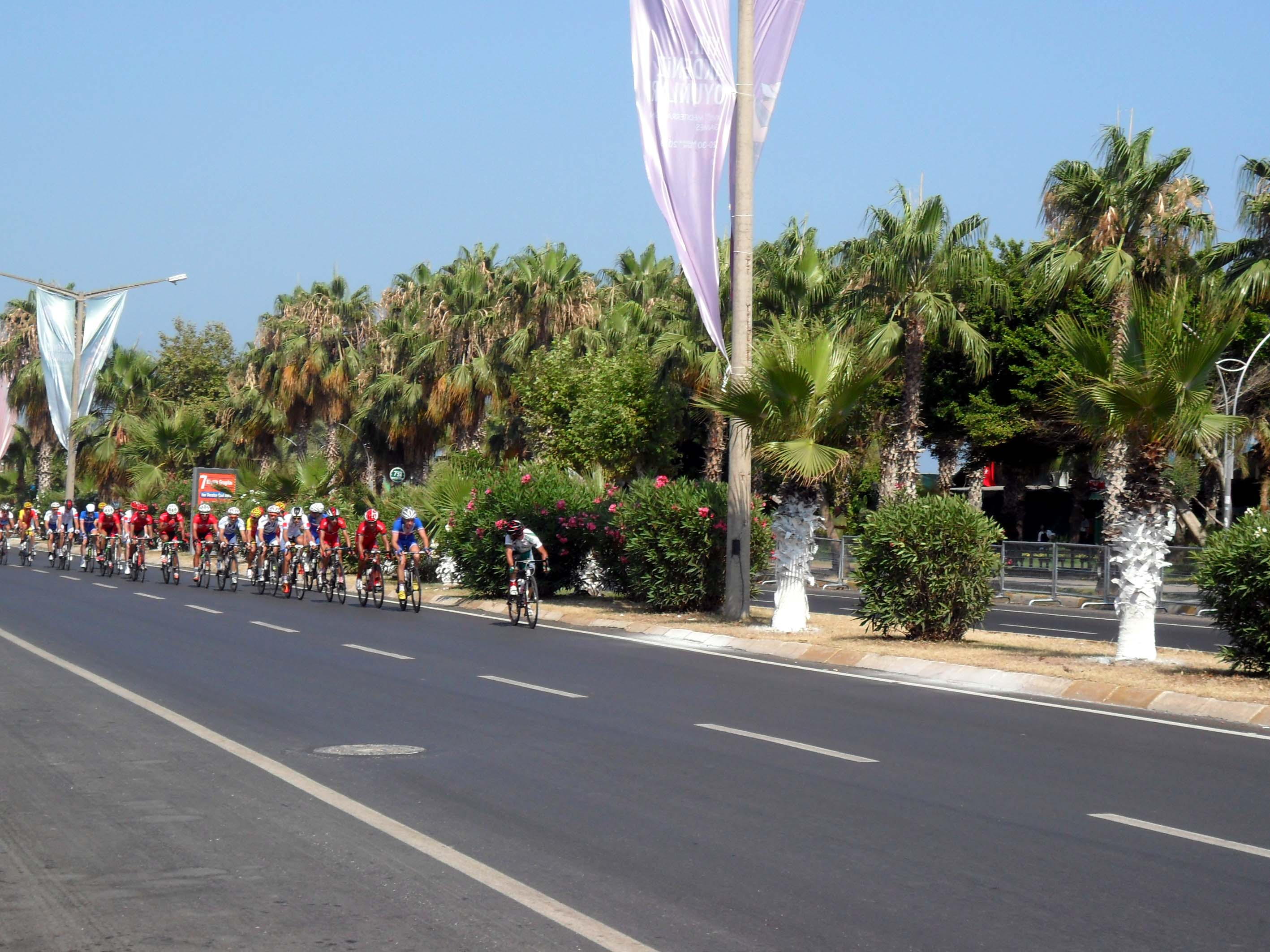
Cyclists at 2013 Mediterranean Games

The constant altitude boulevard, without any pronounced curves provides an ideal racecourse for races. At the 2013 Mediterranean Games, both the cycling and the half marathon events were held on Adnan Menderes Boulevard.
