= Mersin Congress and Exhibition Center =

Conference center in Turkey

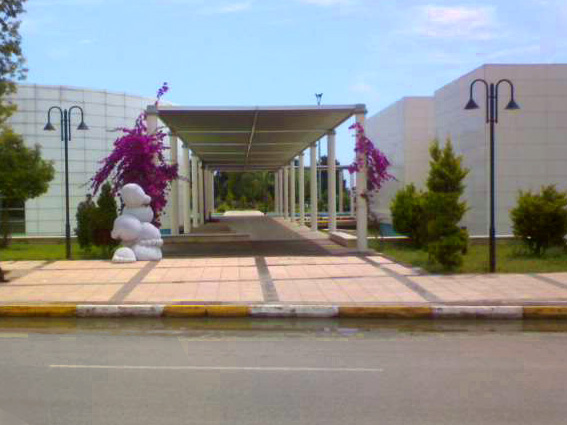
- Interactive map of Mersin Congress and Exhibition Center
- Address: İsmet İnönü Blv, Camiişerif mah. 33257, Mersin, Türkiye
- Location: Atatürk Park, Mersin, Turkey
- Coordinates: 36.79898°N 34.63396°E
- Owner: Mersin Municipality

Construction
- Built: 2005–2008
- Opened: 2008

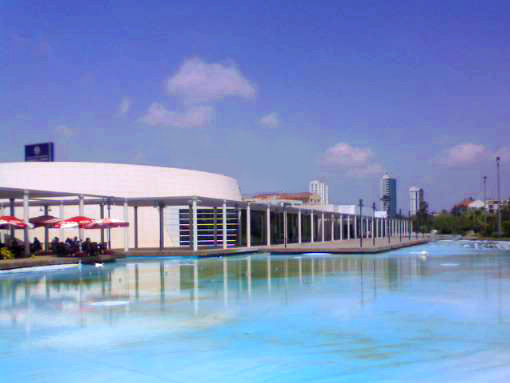

Mersin Congress and Exhibition Center (Turkish: Mersin Kongre ve Sergi Merkezi) is a congress center is Mersin, Turkey. (also called Mersin Congress and Exhibition Palace) It is situated at the north east corner of the Atatürk Park in Mersin. Constructed between 2005 and 2008, it is owned by Mersin municipality. The chief architect is Celal Abdi Güzer.

The center is designed as an artificial island in a pool with the ground area of 3,160 m^{2} (34,000 sq ft). But with the pool, parking area and other open space facilities, the center covers a much wider area. There are three conference halls in the center, the biggest being a 1,000-seat hall.
