= Akdeniz, Mersin =

Secondary municipality in Mersin, Turkey

Akdeniz
- District and municipality
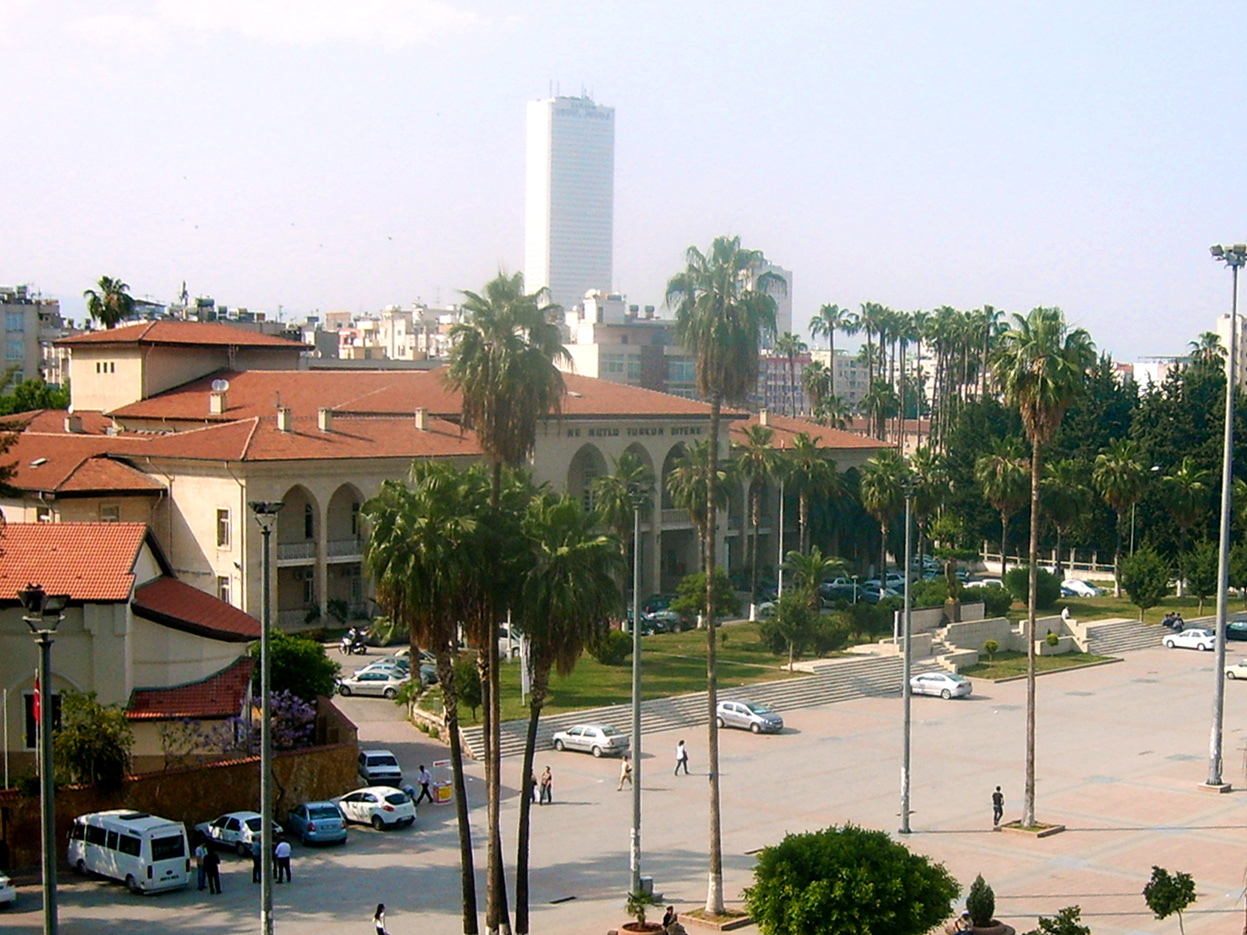
- Mersin Halkevi, a public building in Akdeniz

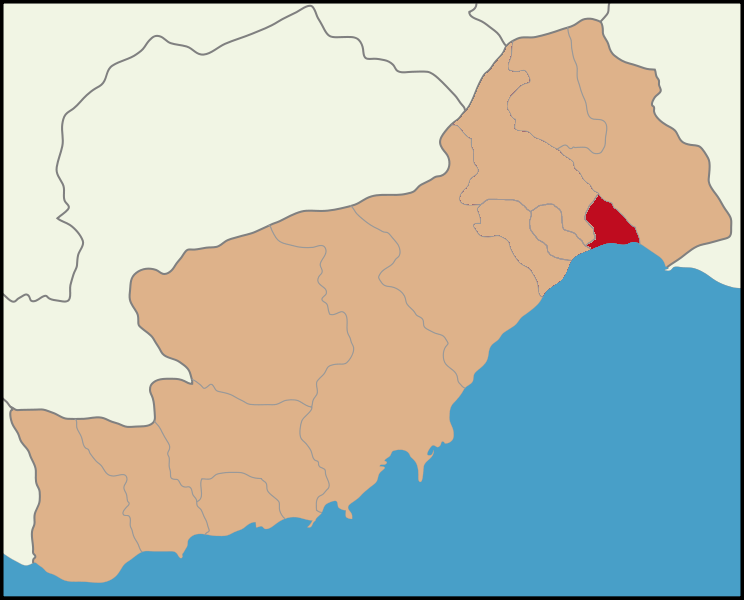
- Map showing Akdeniz District in Mersin Province

- Location within Turkey
- Coordinates: 36°48′N 34°38′E
- Country: Turkey
- Province: Mersin

Government
  - Mayor: Zeyit Şener (State Appointment)
- Area: 265 km^{2} (102 sq mi)
- Population (2022): 255,946
  - Density: 966/km^{2} (2,500/sq mi)
- Time zone: UTC+3 (TRT)
- Area code: 0324
- Website: www.akdeniz.bel.tr

Akdeniz is a municipality and district of Mersin Province, Turkey. Its area is 265 km^{2}, and its population is 255,946 (2022). It covers the central and eastern part of the city of Mersin and the adjacent countryside.

== History ==
The municipality of Akdeniz was established in 1993 as a secondary level municipality. In 2008 the district Akdeniz was created from part of the former central district of Mersin, along with the districts Mezitli, Toroslar and Yenişehir. At the same time, the former municipalities Adanalıoğlu, Bahçeli, Dikilitaş, Karacailyas, Kazanlı, Yenitaşkent, Bağcılar and Huzurkent were absorbed into the municipality of Akdeniz. At the 2013 Turkish local government reorganisation, the rural part of the district was integrated into the municipality, the villages becoming neighbourhoods.

== Location ==
Akdeniz borders the other districts Toroslar to the north and Yenişehir to the west. The south is bounded by the Mediterranean Sea and the west is bounded by Müftü River.

== Business ==
Most of government offices as well as the seats of Mersin governor and the mayor of Greater Mersin are in Akdeniz. Akdeniz also hosts most of the business quarters of the city. Mersin railway station, harbor, free port and maritime authority, as well as, shipping and customs agencies are in Akdeniz. The port of Mersin is the biggest in Turkey. It is especially used for export. In the port area there is a 100,000 tonnes grain silo and a fertiliser factory. East of Akdeniz is industrial region, with a petroleum refinery and factories of glass, cement, ferrochrome and soda.

== Composition ==
There are 65 neighbourhoods in Akdeniz District:

- Abdullahşahutoğlu
- Adanalıoğlu
- Adnan Menderes
- Akdam
- Akdeniz
- Anadolu
- Aşağı Burhan
- Bağcılar-Ihsaniye
- Bağlarbaşı
- Bahçe
- Bahşiş
- Barış
- Bekirde
- Camili
- Camişerif
- Çankaya
- Çay
- Çilek
- Civanyaylağı
- Cumhuriyet
- Demirhisar
- Dikilitaş
- Emek
- Esenli
- Evci
- Evren
- Gazi
- Gündoğdu
- Güneş
- Hal
- Hamidiye
- Hebilli
- Hürriyet
- Iğdır
- İhsaniye
- Karacailyas
- Karaduvar
- Kazanlı
- Kiremithane
- Köselerli
- Kulak
- Kültür
- Kürkçü
- Limonlu
- Mahmudiye
- Mesudiye
- Mitatpaşa
- Müfide Ilhan
- Nacarlı
- Nusratiye
- Özgürlük
- Parmakkurdu
- Puğkaracadağ
- Şakirgülmen
- Sarıibrahimli
- Şevket Sümer
- Siteler
- Toroslar
- Turgut Reis
- Üçocak
- Yanpar
- Yenimahalle
- Yeşilçimen
- Yeşilova
- Yukarı Burhan

== Sites of interest ==
- Mersin Atatürk Museum
- Mersin State Art and Sculpture Museum
- Mersin Urban History Museum

== Gallery ==
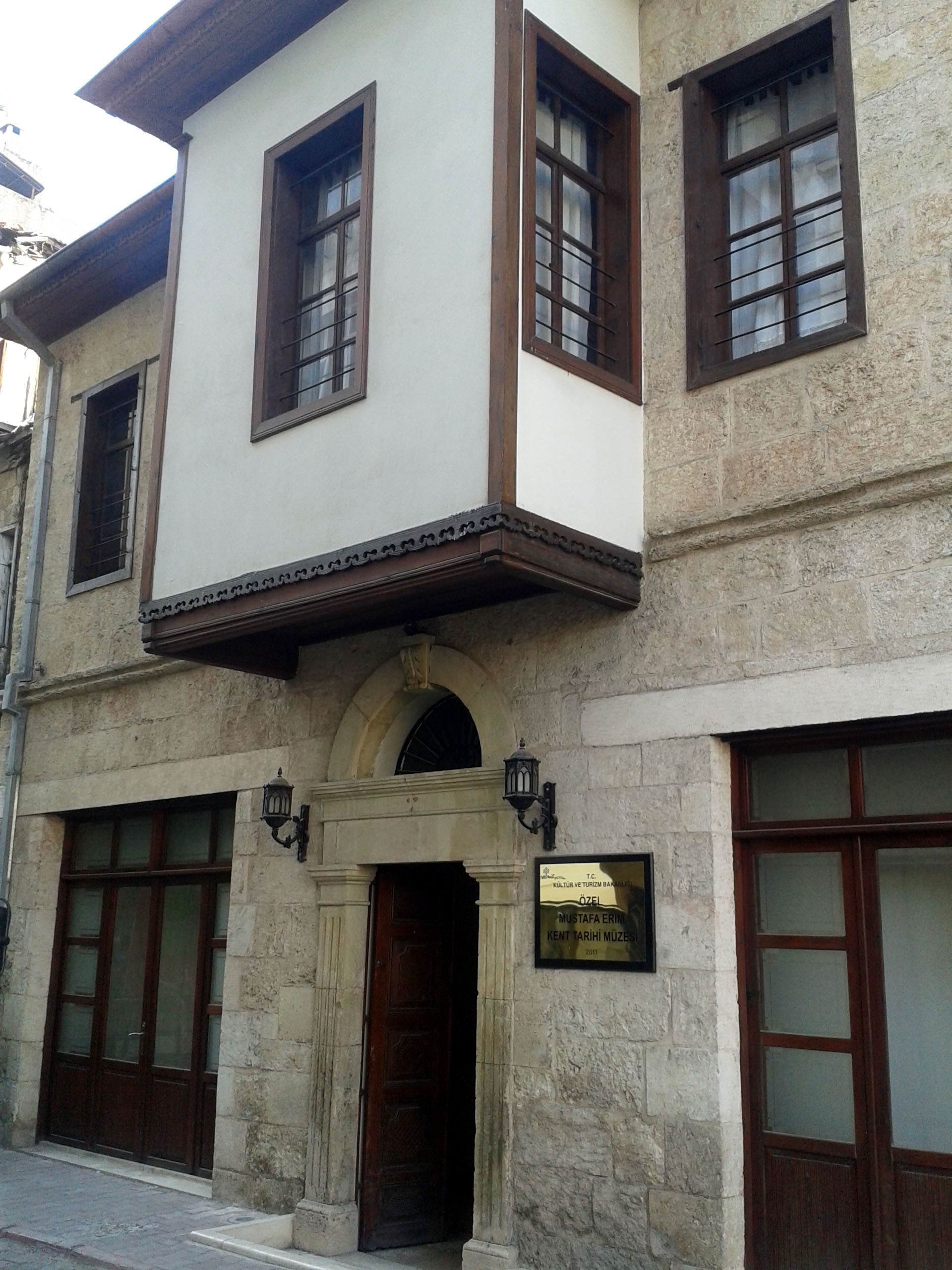
Mersin Urban History Museum

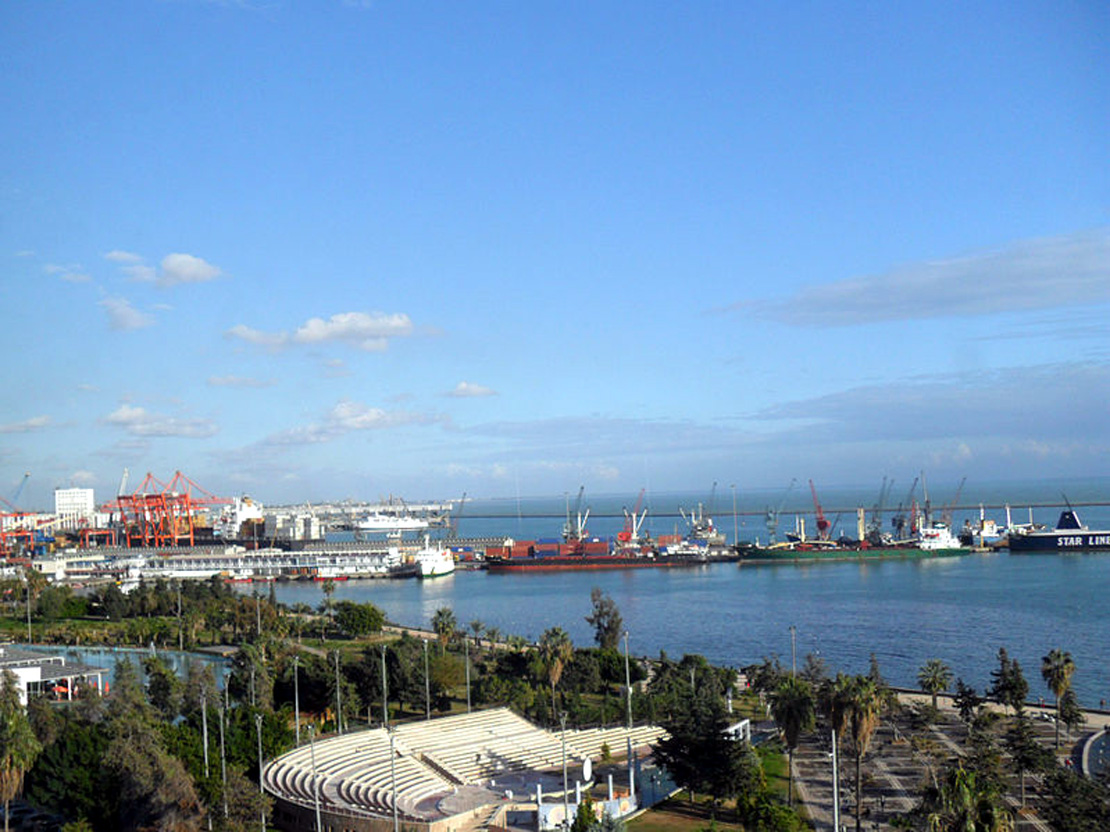
Mersin Harbor

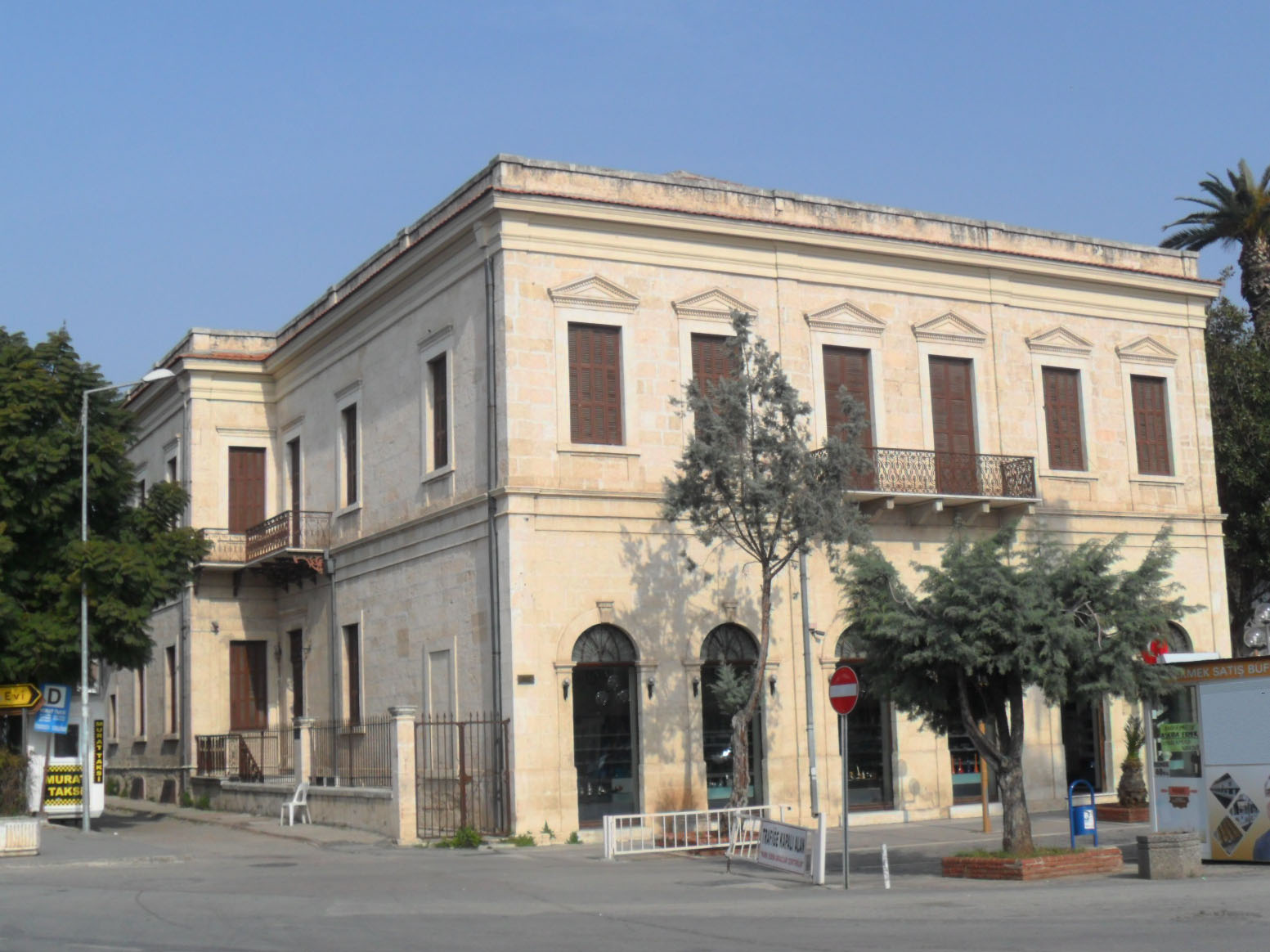
Mersin Atatürk Museum

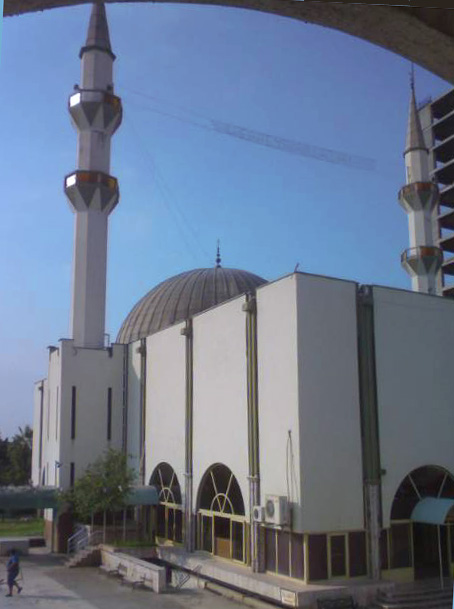
Mersin Grand Mosque

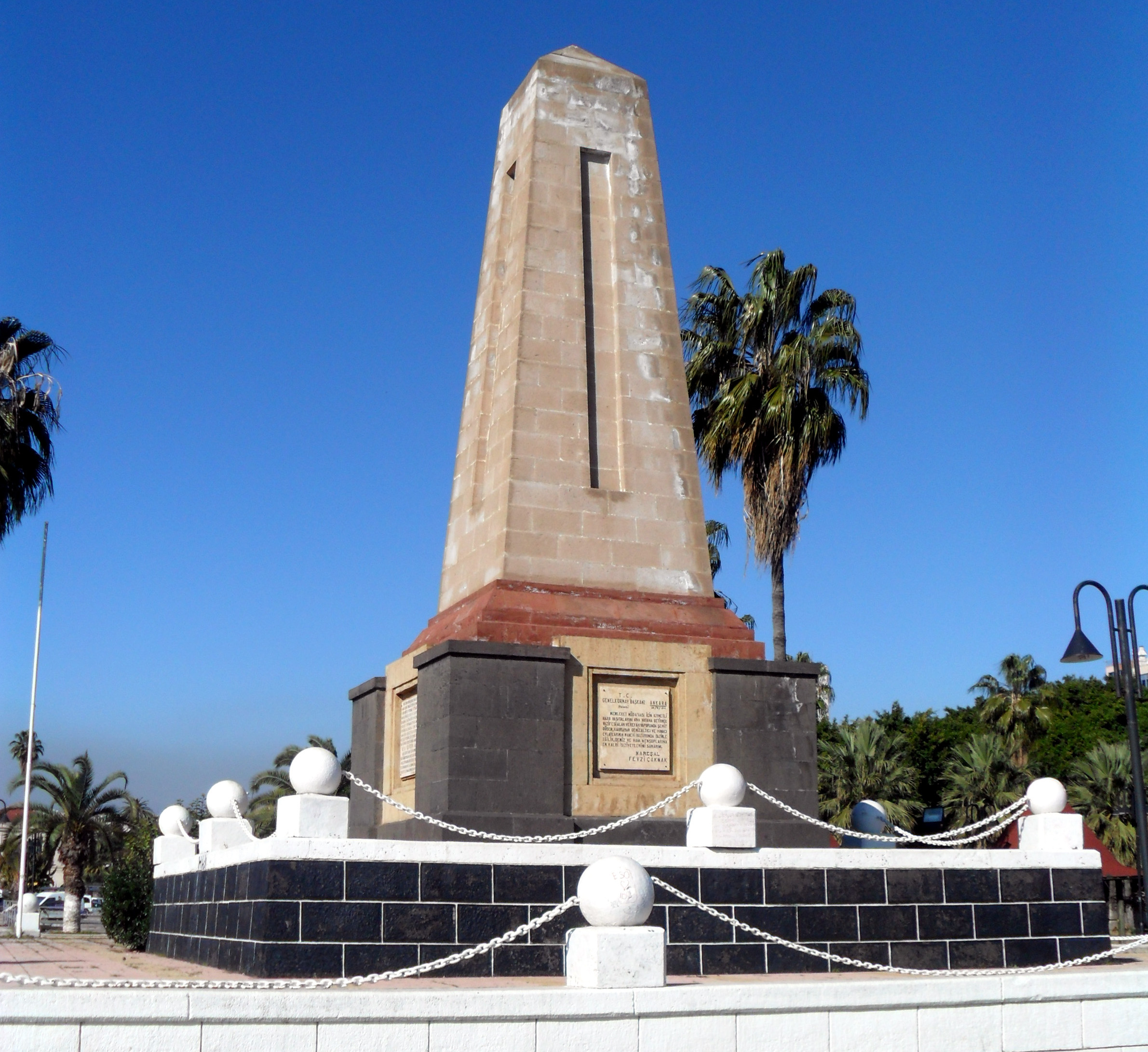
Refah Monument

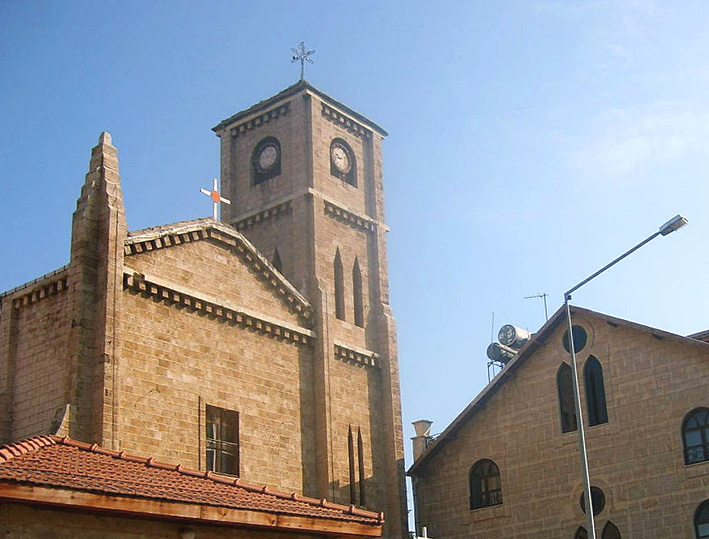
Mersin Catholic Church

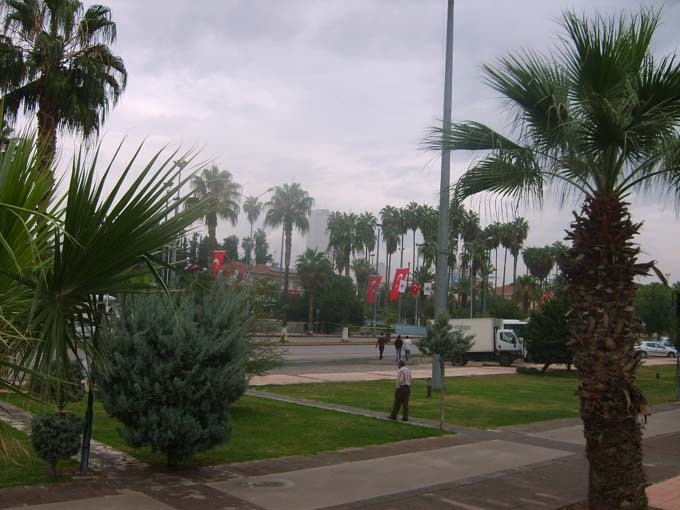
Street scene
