= Port of Mersin =

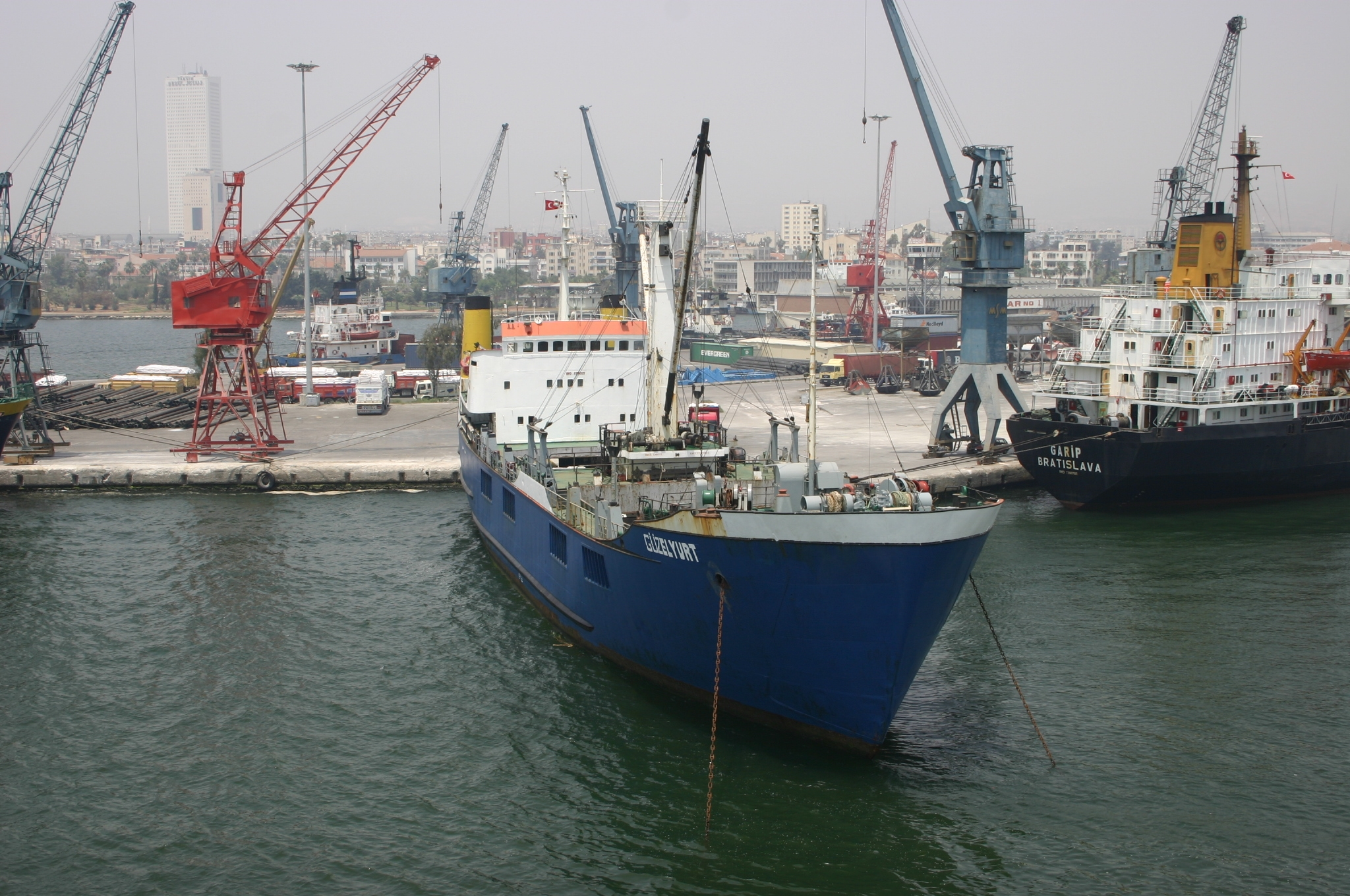
- Port of Mersin
- Interactive map of Port of Mersin

Location
- Country: Turkey
- Location: Mersin
- Coordinates: 36.80045°N 34.63908°E
- UN/LOCODE: TRMER

Details
- Opened: 1958
- Operated by: PSA – Akfen
- Owned by: Turkish State Railways (TCDD)
- Type of Harbor: bulk cargo, Container terminal, Ro-Ro and oil terminal

Port of Mersin (Turkey)

The Port of Mersin (Turkish: Mersin Limanı), is a major seaport located on the north-eastern coast of Mediterranean Sea in Mersin, southern Turkey. As one of the largest harbors in the country, it is Turkey's main gateway to the Mediterranean Sea. It was constructed during the 1950s as a major government project. It is the country's second largest port after Ambarli, near Istanbul. Owned by the Turkish State Railways (TCDD), its operating right is transferred on May 11, 2007, to PSA – Akfen consortium for a period of 36 years.

== Background ==
During the American Civil War in the 19th century, Mersin, then a small town, had become an important seaport for the export of cotton in eastern Mediterranean Sea because of the increased demand. In the later years, with a considerable hinterland in Anatolia, Mersin flourished as a major port. However, it lacked the harbor facilities and the Gulf of Mersin was found to be insufficient for secure anchorage. So, after the proclamation of the Turkish Republic in 1923, a harbor infrastructure for Mersin was suggested, and a company was established on 29 August 1929 both for the exploitation of the port and construction of the harbor infrastructure. Nevertheless, at the eve of the World War II, the project was postponed and the company was acquired on 14 August 1942 by the government.

== Construction ==
International auction by underbidding was held on 4 April 1954 and the groundbreaking ceremony was held on 25 April the same year. The awarded party was the Royal Nederlands Harbour Works Co. (Dutch: Koninklijke Nederlandsche maatschappij voor havenwerken N.V.). The governmental inspection authority was in Mersin. While under construction, the first pier was put in use by 30 August 1958 and the last one by 30 June 1961. The construction of the complementary buildings and structures like administrative buildings, passenger lounges, warehouses and roads followed. The harbor is situated in Akdeniz secondary municipality area.

== Location ==
The harbor is situated in the Akdeniz district of Mersin. The Mersin railway station is just north of the harbor. Mersin Aquapark is situated next to the western breakwater.

== Structure ==
The port's rail connection brings heavy freight train traffic to Mersin, via the Adana–Mersin railway. The railway infrastructure within the Port of Mersin is one of the best in Turkey with Derince. There are 4 railway ramps. Containers can be handled without any need of shunting. 5 of the berths has railway connection, where loading/unloading to/from vessels can be done directly.

The port has bulk cargo, container, Ro-Ro and oil terminals.

=== Quays ===
The main quays as of the 1960s were the following:

- Merchandise quay (comprising foreign, domestic and passenger piers)
- Cereal quay (with a 100,000 ton silo, which was the subject of another project) Caissons are used in this quay for supporting the conveyor of the silo. These 12 caissons were the largest caissons used in Turkey up to the 1960s.
- Livestock and timber quay
- Fishery quay
- Bulk product (including mineral ore and coal) quay
- Petroleum quay (associated with ATAŞ refinery, which was the subject of another project)
- Maintenance quay

There is also a small marina at the west side of the harbor.

=== Breakwaters ===
There are two breakwaters:

- The 2,400 m (7,900 ft) east breakwater is a downwind breakwater. It is constructed by concrete blocks each weighted 60 metric tonnes.
- The 1,600 m (5,200 ft) southwest breakwater is the main breakwater for the dominant wind of lodos in the Mersin area. It is constructed by block stones. 1.75 million metric tonnes of stone was carried by barges from a quarry around Limonlu town some 45 km (28 mi) west of Mersin.

=== Dredging ===
Bucket dredging of the sea floor was carried out by a Danish company Christiani & Nielsen in four years. The level of the floor was lowered to an average depth level of 10 m (33 ft), between 6 and 14 m (20 and 46 ft) depending on the pier. The total area of dredging was more than 3.5 km^{2} (1.4 mi^{2}) and the mass of the total dredged material was about 8.4 million metric tonnes. Most of these material was spread out in front of the city to build a seaside park. (Atatürk Park)

=== Warehouses ===
- Two 75 m × 120 m (246 ft × 394 ft) warehouses with prestressed roof for transit goods.
- One 75 m × 32 m (246 ft × 105 ft) passengers' warehouse

Mersin harbour has also an open storage space of more than 3 km^{2} (1.2 mi^{2}).

== Project completion and aftermath ==
The total cost of the project was 70 million Dutch guilders or about US$34 million, not including the cost of other smaller construction works in the harbor area (roads, railways, electrification, signalization, landscape works and private sector buildings etc.) In the later years, original design of the surface installations were changed and new piers were added. Also a fertiliser plant (Akgübre) was constructed within the harbor area. In 2007, the operating rights of the port was transferred within the governmental privatization programme to the consortium of PSA – Akfen.

== One of the Turkey's top 50 civil engineering projects ==
Turkish Chamber of Civil Engineers lists Mersin Harbor as one of the fifty civil engineering feats in Turkey, a list of remarkable engineering projects realized in the first 50 years of the chamber.
