= Musalı =

Musalı or Musaly may refer to:

- Musalı, Jalilabad, Azerbaijan
- Musaly, Salyan, Azerbaijan
- Musalı, Mersin, Turkey
