= Evciler Castle =

Castle in Turkey

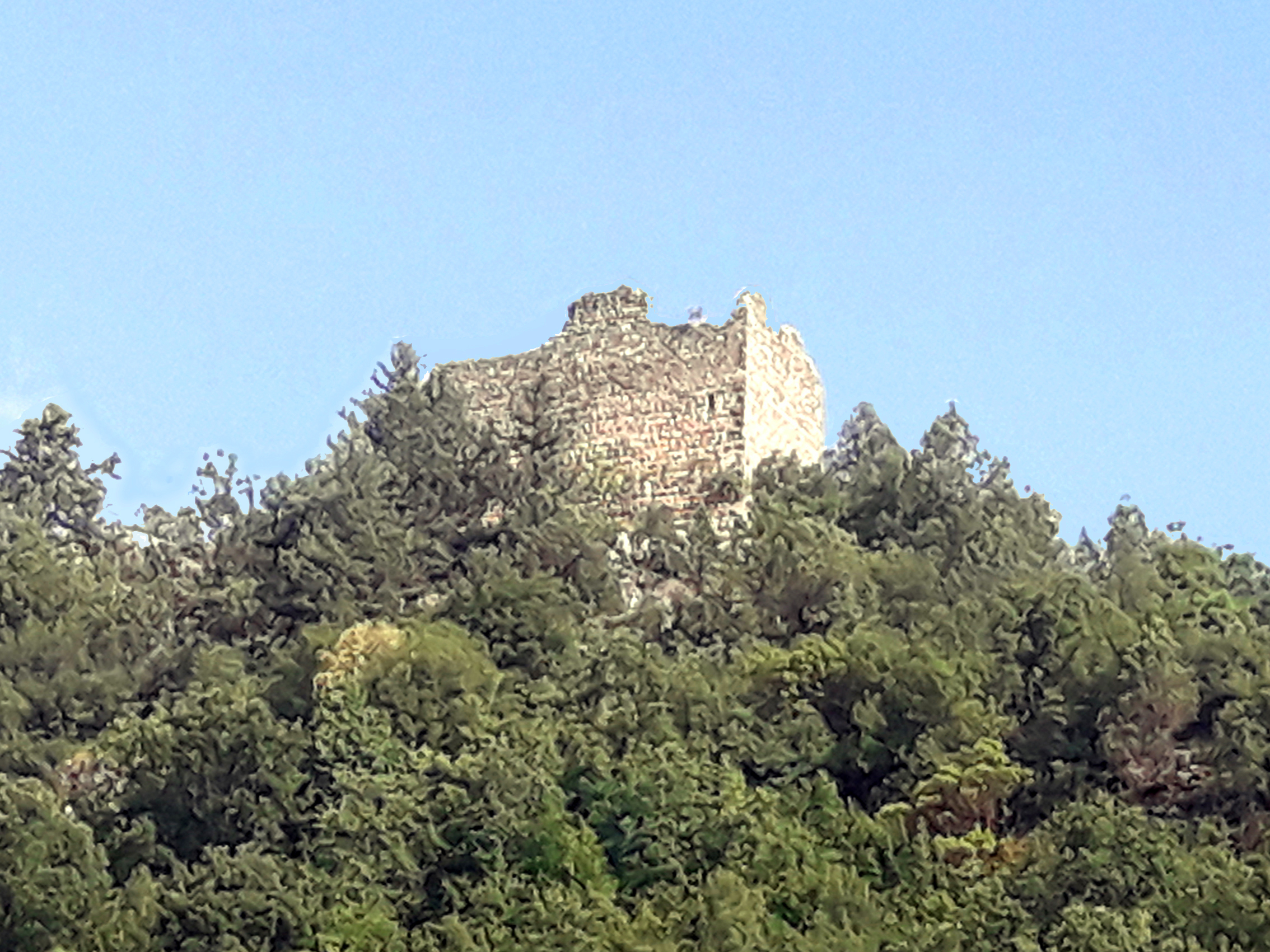
Evciler Castle

Evciler Castle (Turkish: Evciler Kalesi), also called as Kızılbağ Castle, and Evcili Castle is a small medieval castle in Mersin Province, Turkey.

The castle is located at 37°02′26″N 34°29′34″E. Visitors from Mersin follow to highway norths to Kızılbağ, and from there eastwards to Değirmendere. The castle is situated on a 890 m (2,920 ft)-high hill. It overlooks Kızılbağ Pond. Its distance to Mersin is about 40 km (25 mi).

There is no historical document about the castle, which was formally surveyed in 1979. But, judging from the masonry, it may be a Byzantine or Armenian fortification. It has small rectangular plan and three storey keep.
