= Kızılbağ Pond =

Artificial pond in Mersin Province, Turkey

- Güzelyayla Pond
- Kızılbağ Göleti (Turkish)
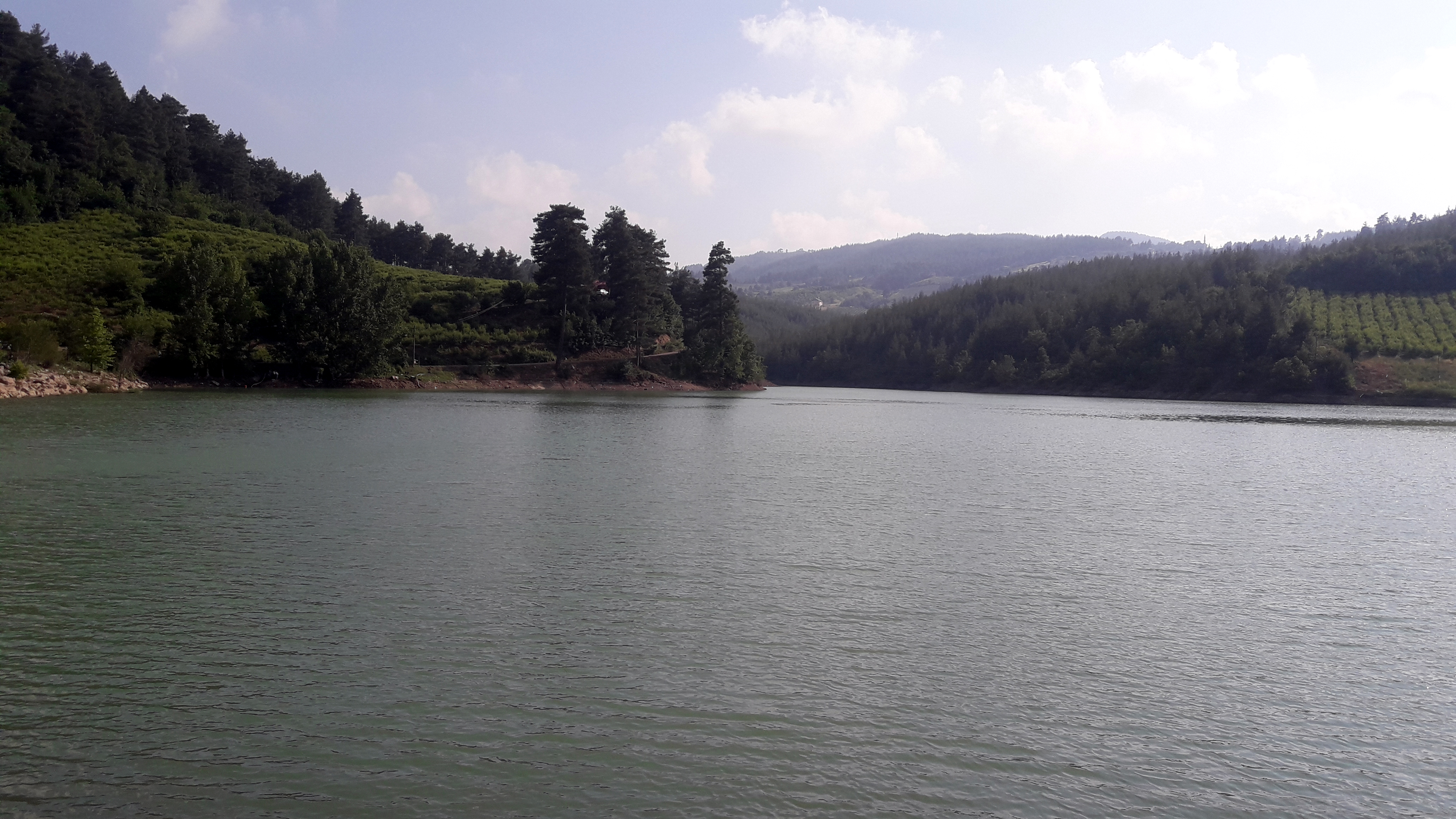
- Kızılbağ Pond

- Location within Turkey
- Location: Mersin Province, Turkey
- Coordinates: 37°02′15″N 34°29′27″E
- Type: artificial pond

Kızılbağ Pond (Turkish: Kızılbağ Göleti), also known as Güzelyayla Pond, is an artificial pond in Mersin Province, Turkey.

The pond is in the rural area of Toroslar secondary municipality in Mersin Province at 37°02′15″N 34°29′27″E. The visitors follow the road from Mersin to Kızılbağ and then to another road to Değirmendere. The pond is to the north of the road. The total distance to Mersin is about 35 kilometres (22 mi). The pond was recently constructed on the upper reaches of Deliçay. The surface area of the pond is 346 hectares (850 acres).
