= Çamlıdere, Mersin =

Çamlıdere
- Neighbourhood
- Location in Turkey
- Coordinates: 36°54′N 34°33′E
- Country: Turkey
- Province: Mersin
- District: Toroslar
- Elevation: 450 m (1,480 ft)
- Population (2022): 126
- Time zone: UTC+3 (TRT)
- Area code: 0324

Çamlıdere is a neighbourhood in the municipality and district of Toroslar, Mersin Province, Turkey. Its population is 126 (2022). Çamlıdere lies along the highway which connects Mersin to Gözne and Arslanköy. The distance to Mersin is about 10 kilometres (6.2 mi). At the west of the village, there is an animal house for the street dogs of Mersin.
