= Müftü Mosque =

Historic mosque in Mersin, Turkey

Mersin Müftü Mosque
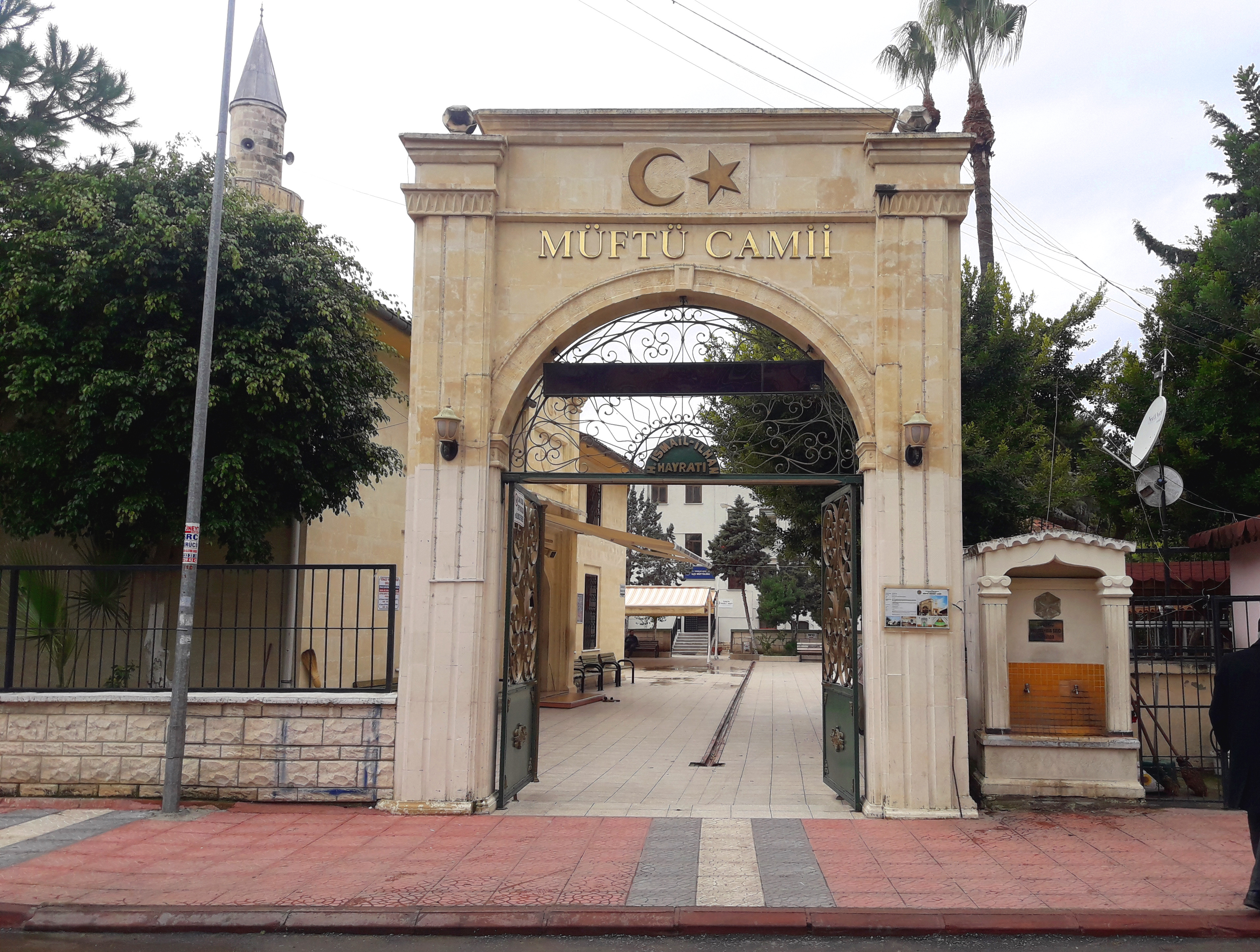
- Müftü Mosque portal from the east

Religion
- Affiliation: Islam
- Province: Mersin Province
- Region: Mediterranean Region
- Rite: Sunni Islam
- Status: Active

Location
- Location: Mersin, Turkey
- Interactive map of Mersin Müftü Mosque
- Coordinates: 36°47′18″N 34°36′57″E

Architecture
- Type: Mosque
- Completed: 1884; 142 years ago
- Minaret: 1

Müftü Mosque (Turkish: Müftü Camisi) is a historic mosque in Mersin, Turkey.

The mosque is to the east of Efrenk River, also known as Müftü River referring to the mosque. The mosque was commissioned by Müftü Emin in 1884. A Müftü (Mufti) is an Islamic scholar, who interprets and expounds Islamic law sharia and fiqh, a jurist qualified to give authoritative legal opinion known as fatwa. Originally, there was also a madrasa to the northeast of the mosque. Later, a Quran course building was built to the west of the main building.

The square-plan mosque is built with ashlar, and has a wooden roof. Main portal to the yard is from the east. There are two auxiliary gates from the north. The shadirvan, the fountain for abdest, is to the north and the single minaret is to the northwest of the main building. In the burial area to the east of the building, there are three tombs which belong to Müftü Emin, his wife and his son.

The madrasa is currently no more existent and some of the original work was lost. The mosque and the Quran course building underwent restoration in 2007 by the Directorate General of Foundations. Currently, the Quran course building is being used as the Müftü's office.
