= Kızılkaya, Toroslar =

Kızılkaya
- Neighbourhood
- Location in Turkey
- Coordinates: 37°05′N 34°32′E
- Country: Turkey
- Province: Mersin
- District: Toroslar
- Elevation: 1,225 m (4,019 ft)
- Population (2022): 97
- Time zone: UTC+3 (TRT)
- Area code: 0324

Kızılkaya is a neighbourhood in the municipality and district of Toroslar, Mersin Province, Turkey. Its population is 97 (2022). It is situated in the Toros Mountains next to another village named Alanyalı. The distance to Mersin is 43 kilometres (27 mi). The village is inhabited by Tahtacı.
