= Çağlarca =

Çağlarca may refer to:

- Çağlarca, Konyaaltı, village in Antalya Province, Turkey
- Çağlarca, Toroslar, village in Mersin Province, Turkey
