= Işıktepe, Toroslar =

Işıktepe
- Neighbourhood
- Location in Turkey
- Coordinates: 36°52′19″N 34°33′25″E
- Country: Turkey
- Province: Mersin
- District: Toroslar
- Elevation: 180 m (590 ft)
- Population (2022): 115
- Time zone: UTC+3 (TRT)
- Area code: 0324

Işıktepe is a neighbourhood in the municipality and district of Toroslar, Mersin Province, Turkey. Its population is 115 (2022). It is situated in the southern slopes of the Toros Mountains, close to Hamzabeyli, another village. The distance to city center is 17 kilometres (11 mi).
