= Yeniköy, Mersin =

Yeniköy
- Neighbourhood
- Location in Turkey
- Coordinates: 36°58′N 34°30′E
- Country: Turkey
- Province: Mersin
- District: Toroslar
- Elevation: 850 m (2,790 ft)
- Population (2022): 343
- Time zone: UTC+3 (TRT)
- Area code: 0324

Yeniköy is a neighbourhood in the municipality and district of Toroslar, Mersin Province, Turkey. Its population is 343 (2022). It is situated in the forests of the Taurus Mountains to the east of the Müftü River valley. The distance to Mersin is 25 kilometres (16 mi). The main agricultural crops are fruits such as cherries and peaches.
