= Kurudere, Mersin =

Kurudere
- Neighbourhood
- Location in Turkey
- Coordinates: 37°01′N 34°25′E
- Country: Turkey
- Province: Mersin
- District: Toroslar
- Elevation: 1,190 m (3,900 ft)
- Population (2022): 86
- Time zone: UTC+3 (TRT)
- Area code: 0324

Kurudere is a neighbourhood in the municipality and district of Toroslar, Mersin Province, Turkey. Its population is 86 (2022). It is situated in the Toros Mountains, on the road connecting Mersin to Arslanköy. The distance to Mersin is 36 kilometres (22 mi).
