= Deliçay =

River in Mersin, Turkey

Deliçay (literally 'crazy creek', also called Selindi) is a creek in Mersin Province, Turkey. In Turkish rivers with irregular flowrate are usually called Deliçay. But here it is a proper noun and it refers to its highly irregular flowrate.

The head waters are close to the village Değirmendere in Toros Mountains. In fact at this point the village and the river are named after each other. (Değirmendere means "mill river") But in the lower reaches it is called Deliçay. It flows by the villages of Çandır, Parmakkurdu and Hebilli. It discharges to Mediterranean Sea at 36°48′29″N 34°42′57″E between Kazanlı (Aulai of the antiquity) and Karaduvar (Anchiale of the antiquity).

In the past this river was called Serince, Selinti and Anhiyaleos
