= Korucular (disambiguation) =

Korucular is a Turkish word meaning "guards". It may refer to:

- Korucular village guards system in Turkey
- Korucular, Murgul a village in Artvin Province
- Korucular, Mersin a village in Mersin Province
