= Aladağ, Mersin =

Aladağ
- Neighbourhood
- Location in Turkey
- Coordinates: 36°57′N 34°30′E
- Country: Turkey
- Province: Mersin
- District: Toroslar
- Elevation: 740 m (2,430 ft)
- Population (2022): 369
- Time zone: UTC+3 (TRT)
- Area code: 0324

Aladağ is a neighbourhood in the municipality and district of Toroslar, Mersin Province, Turkey. Its population is 369 (2022). It is 25 kilometres (16 mi) to Mersin. The village is situated in forests of Taurus Mountains overlooking Müftü River valley at the west and there are picnic sites as well as summer resort houses in the vicinity of the village. Main agricultural product is olive.
