= Atlılar =

Atlılar (literally "horsemen" or "cavalrymen") is a Turkish place name and may refer to:

- Aloda, a village in the Famagusta district in the Turkish Federated State of North Cyprus, whose Turkish name is Atlılar
- Atlılar, Mersin, a village in Mersin Province, Turkey
