= Soğucak =

Settlement in Turkey

Soğucak Belenkeşlik
- Neighbourhood
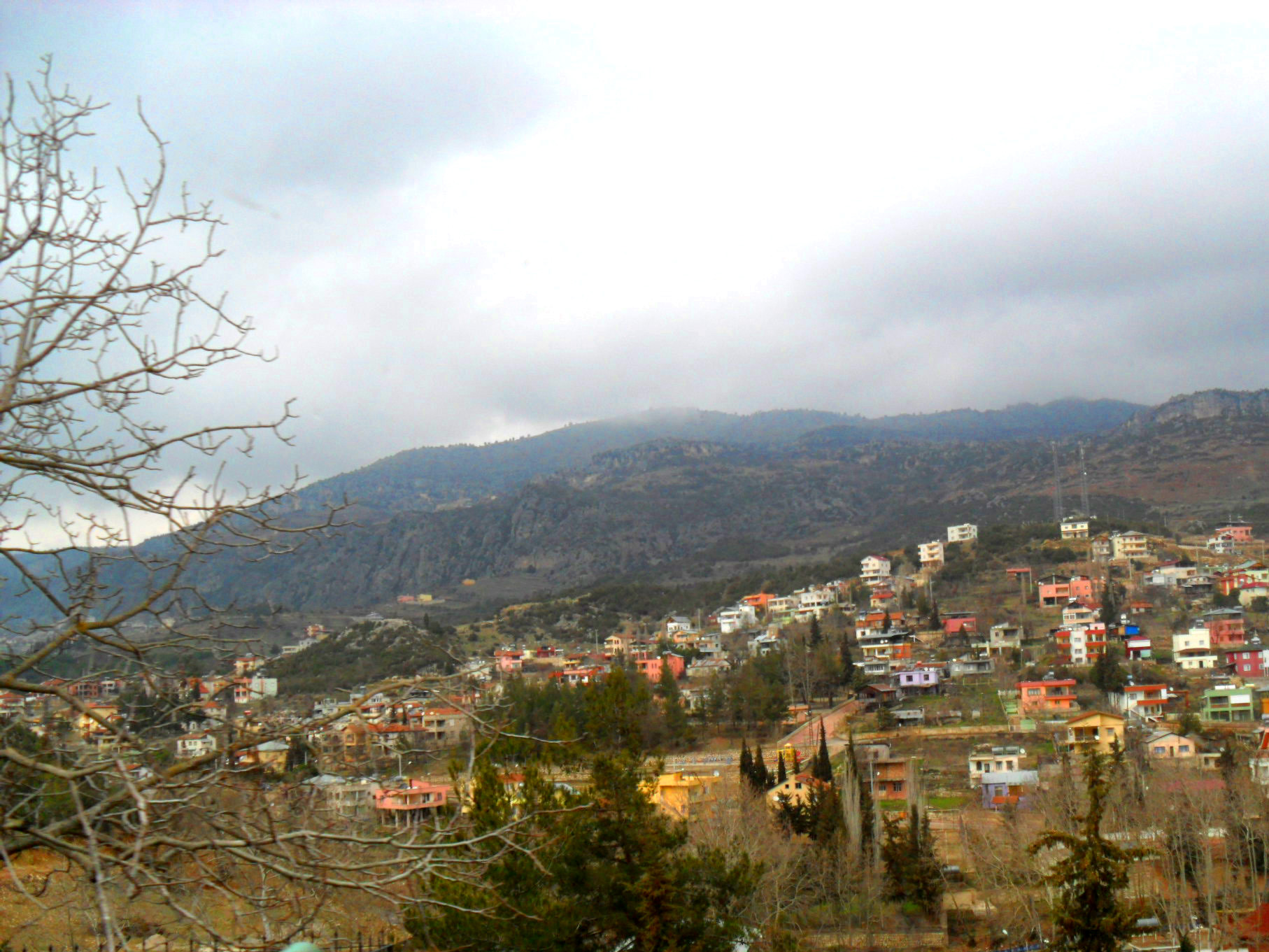

- Location within Turkey
- Coordinates: 36°58′N 34°33′E
- Country: Turkey
- Province: Mersin
- District: Toroslar
- Elevation: 825 m (2,707 ft)
- Population (2022): 712
- Time zone: UTC+3 (TRT)
- Postal code: 33251
- Area code: 0324

Soğucak, formerly Belenkeşlik, is a neighbourhood in the municipality and district of Toroslar, Mersin Province, Turkey. Its population is 712 (2022). Before the 2013 reorganisation, it was a town (belde).

== Geography ==
The town is situated at the southern slopes of the Taurus Mountains. The average altitude is 825 metres (2,707 ft). It is 24 kilometres (15 mi) north of Mersin.

== History ==
Near the town is a well-preserved, rectangular fortified estate house (keep) built in the 12th or 13th century during the period of the Armenian Kingdom of Cilicia. The upper level has eight embrasured loopholes for archers. This was one of the many sites that guarded a route between the Mediterranean Sea and the Hetʽumid stronghold of Çandır Castle (Papeṙōn). The fortress as well as the small village was named Belenkeşlik. The fortification was surveyed in 1979. For many years, Belenkeşlik was used as a yayla (summer resort of Mersin citizens).

In 1890, the Armenian church records stated there were 76 Armenian households in Mogounk. In 1910, the church only recorded 58 Armenian households. On the eve of the Armenian genocide, there were 67 Armenian households.

During the second half of the 20th century the population of the village increased and the village was declared township in 1997.

== Economy ==
Although the mountains around Soğucak are covered with pine forests, there is enough agricultural land for the Soğucak residents. Fresh fruits and vegetables are the main products. House rental services during summers and animal husbandry are also pronounced activities.
