= Kavaklıpınar =

- Neighbourhood
- Location in Turkey
- Coordinates: 37°01′N 34°21′E
- Country: Turkey
- Province: Mersin
- District: Toroslar
- Elevation: 1,250 m (4,100 ft)
- Population (2022): 248
- Time zone: UTC+3 (TRT)
- Area code: 0324

Kavaklıpınar is a neighbourhood in the municipality and district of Toroslar, Mersin Province, Turkey. Its population is 248 (2022). It is situated in the Toros Mountains. The distance to Mersin city center is 48 kilometres (30 mi).
