= Çelebili =

- Neighbourhood
- Location in Turkey
- Coordinates: 36°56′N 34°36′E
- Country: Turkey
- Province: Mersin
- District: Toroslar
- Elevation: 415 m (1,362 ft)
- Population (2022): 304
- Time zone: UTC+3 (TRT)
- Area code: 0324

Çelebili is a neighbourhood in the municipality and district of Toroslar, Mersin Province, Turkey. Its population is 304 (2022). It is situated in the lower slopes of the Taurus Mountains and close to an artificial lake. Its distance to Mersin city center is 12 kilometres (7.5 mi). The village is a relatively recent settlement. Before being declared a village in 1955, it was a hamlet near Musalı, and the name of the settlement probably refers to a letter writer of the settlement who was called Çelebi, an Ottoman-era title meaning "gentleman."
