= Değnek =

- Neighbourhood
- Location in Turkey
- Coordinates: 37°04′N 34°23′E
- Country: Turkey
- Province: Mersin
- District: Toroslar
- Elevation: 1,360 m (4,460 ft)
- Population (2022): 343
- Time zone: UTC+3 (TRT)
- Area code: 0324

Değnek is a neighbourhood in the municipality and district of Toroslar, Mersin Province, Turkey. Its population is 343 (2022). It is situated on the Taurus Mountains. The distance to Mersin is 48 kilometres (30 mi). The main crops of the village are fruits like peaches and cherries. Irrigation used to be a problem in the past, but today, an irrigation dam is under construction 7 kilometres (4.3 mi) north of the village. In the near future, the dam will be used to irrigate 45,000 decares of land.
