= Kerimler, Mersin =

Kerimler
- Neighbourhood
- Location in Turkey
- Coordinates: 36°55′N 34°32′E
- Country: Turkey
- Province: Mersin
- District: Toroslar
- Elevation: 640 m (2,100 ft)
- Population (2022): 243
- Time zone: UTC+3 (TRT)
- Area code: 0324

Kerimler is a neighbourhood in the municipality and district of Toroslar, Mersin Province, Turkey. Its population is 243 (2022). It is situated in the southern slopes of the Toros Mountains to the north of the city center. The distance to Mersin is 15 kilometres (9.3 mi).
