= Tırtar =

- Neighbourhood
- Location in Turkey
- Coordinates: 37°03′N 34°21′E
- Country: Turkey
- Province: Mersin
- District: Toroslar
- Elevation: 1,550 m (5,090 ft)
- Population (2022): 221
- Time zone: UTC+3 (TRT)
- Area code: 0324

Tırtar is a neighbourhood in the municipality and district of Toroslar, Mersin Province, Turkey. Its population is 221 (2022). The village is in Toros Mountains and the distance to Mersin city center is about 55 kilometres (34 mi). The name of the village refers to a once-nomadic Turkmen tribe. The main economic activity of the village is agriculture.
