= Kepirli =

- Neighbourhood
- Location in Turkey
- Coordinates: 36°57′N 34°33′E
- Country: Turkey
- Province: Mersin
- District: Toroslar
- Elevation: 905 m (2,969 ft)
- Population (2022): 405
- Time zone: UTC+3 (TRT)
- Area code: 0324

Kepirli is a neighbourhood in the municipality and district of Toroslar, Mersin Province, Turkey. Its population is 405 (2022). It is situated in the southern slopes of the Toros Mountains to the north of the city center and on the road connecting Mersin to mountain villages. The distance to Mersin is 20 kilometres (12 mi). The population is composed of Yörüks (once nomadic Turkmens). The village overlooks Mersin and there are on-road restaurants for the passengers around the village .
