= Yüksekoluk =

- Neighbourhood
- Location in Turkey
- Coordinates: 36°59′N 34°25′E
- Country: Turkey
- Province: Mersin
- District: Toroslar
- Elevation: 1,230 m (4,040 ft)
- Population (2022): 400
- Time zone: UTC+3 (TRT)
- Area code: 0324

Yüksekoluk (formerly Glavur) is a neighbourhood in the municipality and district of Toroslar, Mersin Province, Turkey. Its population is 400 (2022). The village is in the Taurus Mountains and the distance to Mersin city center is about 35 kilometres (22 mi). The main economic activity of the village is agriculture.
