= Şahinpınarı =

- Neighbourhood
- Location in Turkey
- Coordinates: 37°01′N 34°38′E
- Country: Turkey
- Province: Mersin
- District: Toroslar
- Elevation: 570 m (1,870 ft)
- Population (2022): 123
- Time zone: UTC+3 (TRT)
- Area code: 0324

Şahinpınarı is a neighbourhood in the municipality and district of Toroslar, Mersin Province, Turkey. Its population is 123 (2022). It is situated in Toros Mountains. The distance to Mersin city center is 36 kilometres (22 mi).
