= Kayrakkeşli =

- Neighbourhood
- Location in Turkey
- Coordinates: 36°56′N 34°29′E
- Country: Turkey
- Province: Mersin
- District: Toroslar
- Elevation: 640 m (2,100 ft)
- Population (2022): 177
- Time zone: UTC+3 (TRT)
- Area code: 0324

Kayrakkeşli (also called Kayrakkeşlik) is a neighbourhood in the municipality and district of Toroslar, Mersin Province, Turkey. Its population is 177 (2022). It is situated on the road connecting Mersin to mountains villages in the Toros Mountains. The distance to Mersin is 25 kilometres (16 mi).
