= Resulköy =

Settlement in Turkey

- Neighbourhood
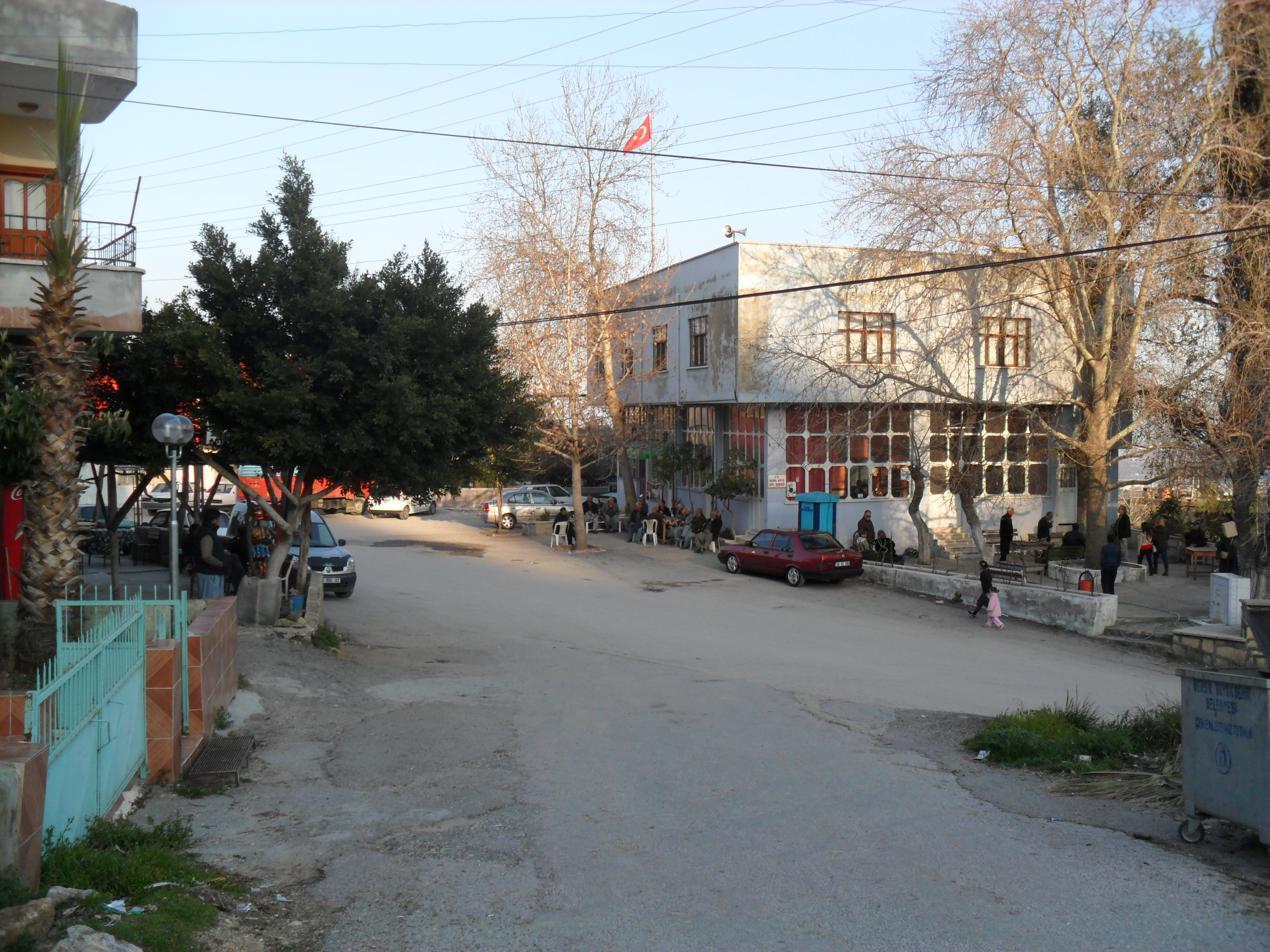
- Public house of the village

- Location within Turkey
- Coordinates: 36°53′N 34°36′E
- Country: Turkey
- Province: Mersin
- District: Toroslar
- Elevation: 295 m (968 ft)
- Population (2022): 946
- Time zone: UTC+3 (TRT)
- Area code: 0324

Resulköy is a neighbourhood in the municipality and district of Toroslar, Mersin Province, Turkey. Its population is 946 (2022). It is situated in the lower slopes of Toros Mountains and just at the north of the Çukurova motorway. Distance to Mersin city center is 12 kilometres (7.5 mi). Scallion is the most important agricultural crop of the village.
