= Horozlu =

Horozlu Hangediği
- Neighbourhood
- Location in Turkey
- Coordinates: 37°02′N 34°28′E
- Country: Turkey
- Province: Mersin
- District: Toroslar
- Elevation: 1,000 m (3,300 ft)
- Population (2022): 189
- Time zone: UTC+3 (TRT)
- Area code: 0324

Horozlu (Hangediği) is a neighbourhood in the municipality and district of Toroslar, Mersin Province, Turkey. Its population is 189 (2022). It is situated in the Toros Mountains. The distance to Mersin city center is 37 kilometres (23 mi).
