= Düğdüören, Toroslar =

Neighbourhood in Mersin Province, Turkey

Düğdüören
- Neighbourhood
- Location in Turkey
- Coordinates: 36°53′2″N 34°34′16″E
- Country: Turkey
- Province: Mersin
- District: Toroslar
- Population (2022): 597
- Time zone: UTC+3 (TRT)

Düğdüören is a neighbourhood in the municipality and district of Toroslar, Mersin Province, Turkey. The village is inhabited by Tahtacı and had a population of 597 in 2022.
