= Doruklu =

- Neighbourhood
- Location in Turkey
- Coordinates: 36°54′54″N 34°33′33″E
- Country: Turkey
- Province: Mersin
- District: Toroslar

Government
  - Muhtar: Hüseyin Demir
- Elevation: 400 m (1,300 ft)
- Population (2022): 774
- Time zone: UTC+3 (TRT)
- Area code: 0324

Doruklu is a neighbourhood in the municipality and district of Toroslar, Mersin Province, Turkey. Its population is 774 (2022). The distance to Mersin is 13 kilometres (8.1 mi). Most of the village inhabitants are actually Turkmen( Turkmen) origin.
