= Efrenk River =

River in South Turkey

The Efrenk River (also called Suntras or Arslanlöy River in the upper reaches and Müftü River in the lower reaches) is a short river in Mersin Province, Turkey. It was originally called the Efrenk River. After a mosque named Müftü Mosque was built by the river in Mersin, it was popularly renamed the Müftü River.

== Geography ==
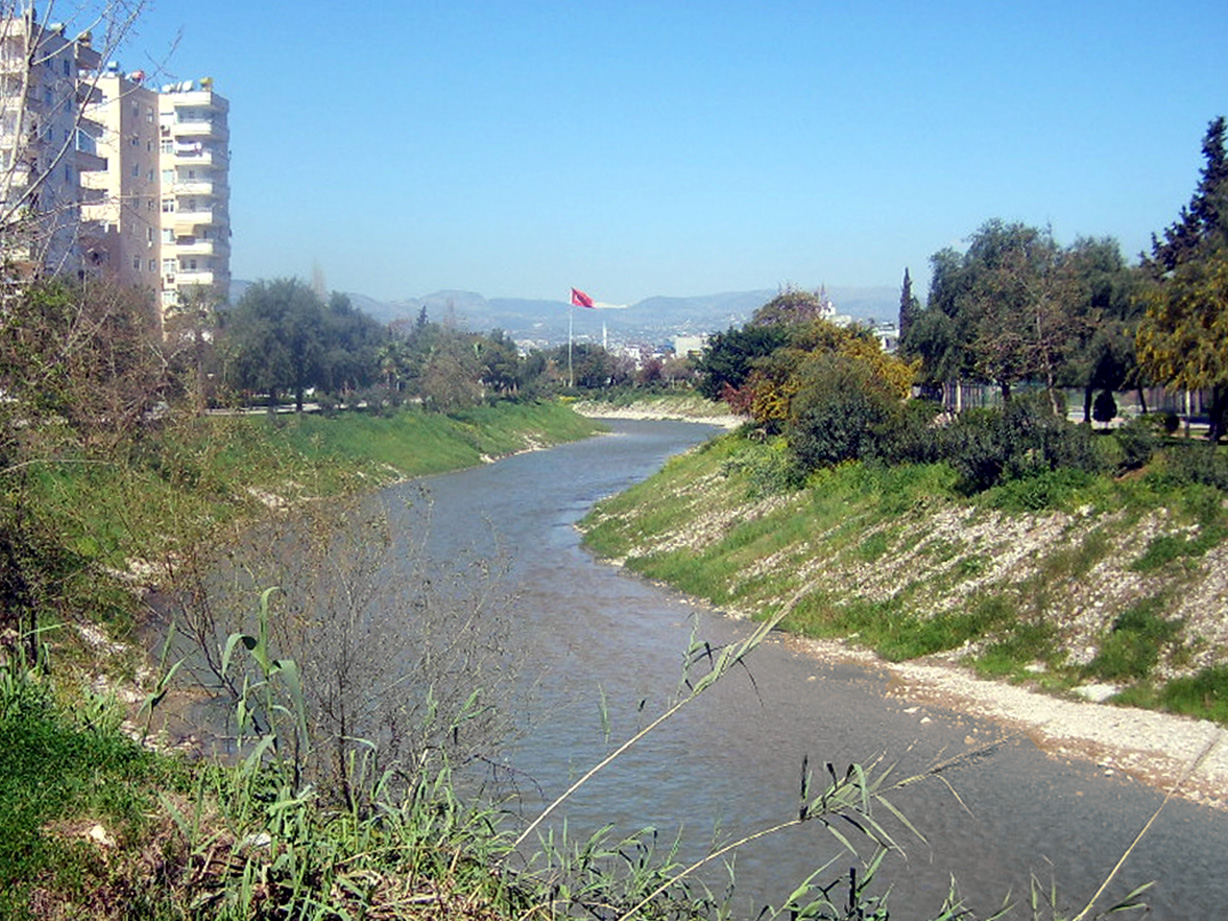

The headwaters are in the Toros Mountains, near the town of Arslanköy and the village of Atlılar (Sadiye). The river runs east and then south, flowing to the Mediterranean Sea within the city of Mersin at 36°47′06″N 34°37′16″E. In fact the river is the borderline between the second level municipalities of Mersin; Yenişehir is to the west and Akdeniz and Toroslar are to the east of the river. There are five bridges within Mersin and one on the Çukurova motorway just north of the city.

== Hydrology ==
The drainage basin is only 480 square kilometres (190 sq mi) in area. But the altitudes of the headwaters are about 1,500 metres (4,900 ft). Thus the river flows fast. Like the other locations of the Mediterranean Region annual precipitation is mostly in the spring and the winter. So the flow rate is highly irregular depending on the season. While the average flow rate is quite low, 303 m^{3}/s (10700 ft^{3}/s) had been recorded during the flood of 2001.

== Arslanköy pond ==
Arslanköy Pond is an artificial pond on the upper reaches of the river. The storage capacity is 1.3 hm^{3} (1.7·10^{6}yd^{3}) and the total irrigation area is about 1.51 km^{2} (0.69 mi^{2}).
