= Evrenli =

- Neighbourhood
- Location in Turkey
- Coordinates: 36°56′N 34°35′E
- Country: Turkey
- Province: Mersin
- District: Toroslar
- Elevation: 440 m (1,440 ft)
- Population (2022): 262
- Time zone: UTC+3 (TRT)
- Area code: 0324

Evrenli is a neighbourhood in the municipality and district of Toroslar, Mersin Province, Turkey. Its population is 262 (2022). Evrenli is to the north of the Mersin city center and the distance to the city center is 18 kilometres (11 mi).
