= Arslanköy Pond =

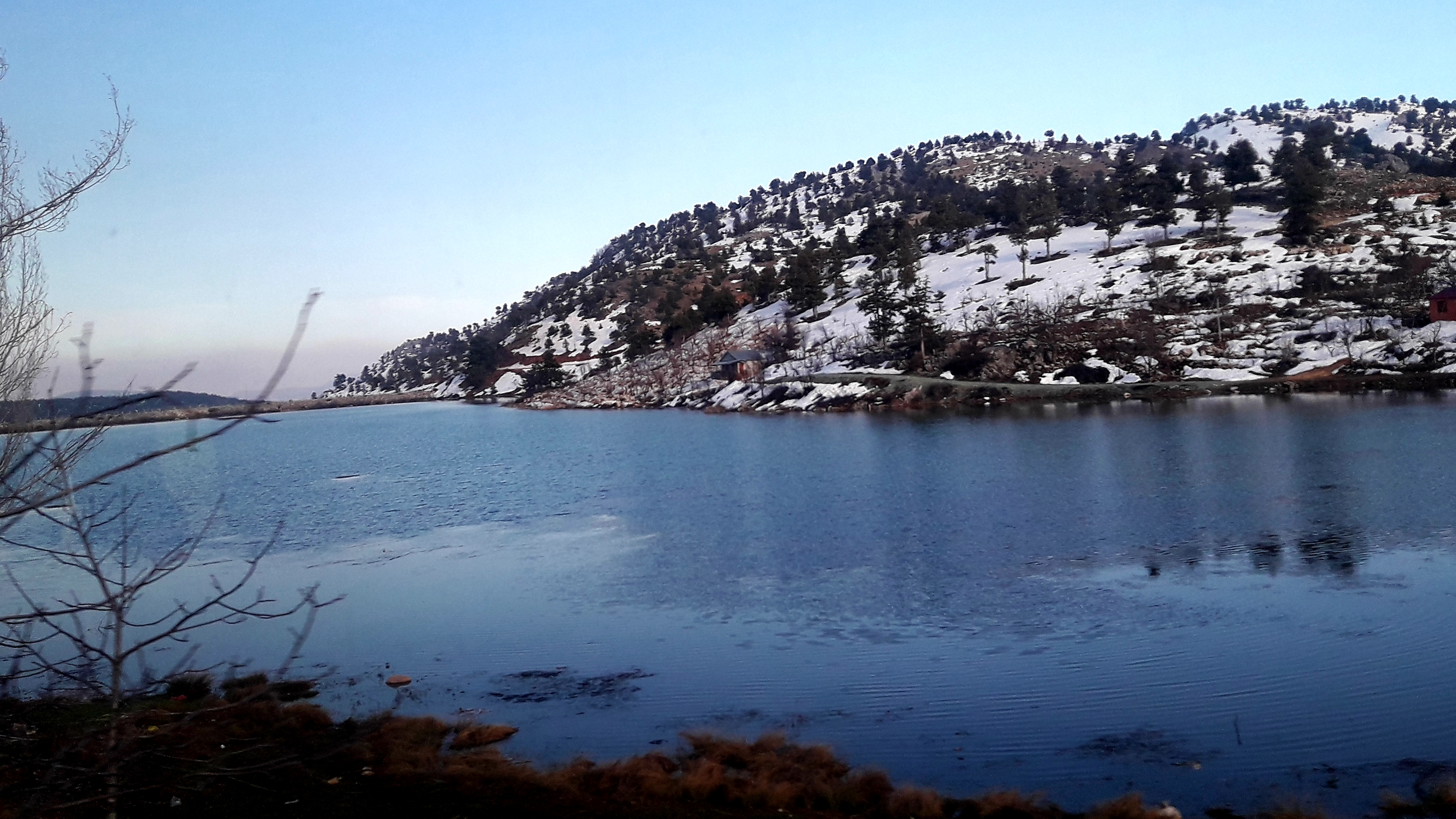
- Arslanköy Pond

- Location within Turkey
- Location: Mersin Province, Turkey
- Coordinates: 37°00′29″N 34°17′05″E
- Type: reservoir
- Water volume: 1,680 cubic hectometres (5.9×10^{10} cu ft)
- Surface elevation: 1,370 metres (4,490 ft)

Arslanköy Pond is an artificial pond in Mersin Province, Turkey. It is used to irrigate 151 hectares (370 acres) of land.

The pond is to the south of Arslanköy in Mersin Province. It is in the Taurus Mountains at 37°00′29″N 34°17′05″E. The altitude of the pond with respect to sea level is 1,370 metres (4,490 ft). Its distance to Mersin is 53 kilometres (33 mi). It was constructed in 2007.

The depth at the thalweg is 28 metres (92 ft) and barrage crest length is 303 metres (994 ft). The maximum water volume is 1,680 cubic hectometres (5.9×10^{10} cu ft) and the amount of riprap is 348,000 cubic metres (12,300,000 cu ft).
