= Yavca =

- Neighbourhood
- Location in Turkey
- Coordinates: 37°01′N 34°23′E
- Country: Turkey
- Province: Mersin
- District: Toroslar
- Elevation: 1,170 m (3,840 ft)
- Population (2022): 291
- Time zone: UTC+3 (TRT)
- Area code: 0324

Yavca is a neighbourhood in the municipality and district of Toroslar, Mersin Province, Turkey. Its population is 291 (2022). The village is in Toros Mountains and the distance to Mersin city center is about 45 kilometres (28 mi). The main economic activity of the village is agriculture.
