= Bekiralanı =

- Neighbourhood
- Location in Turkey
- Coordinates: 36°59′N 34°32′E
- Country: Turkey
- Province: Mersin
- District: Toroslar
- Elevation: 910 m (2,990 ft)
- Population (2022): 651
- Time zone: UTC+3 (TRT)
- Area code: 0324

Bekiralanı is a neighbourhood in the municipality and district of Toroslar, Mersin Province, Turkey. Its population is 651 (2022). The distance to Mersin city center is 28 kilometres (17 mi). It is situated in the Taurus Mountains. It is inhabited by Tahtacı.
