= Dalakdere =

- Neighbourhood
- Location in Turkey
- Coordinates: 36°55′34″N 34°34′8″E
- Country: Turkey
- Province: Mersin
- District: Toroslar
- Elevation: 395 m (1,296 ft)
- Population (2022): 483
- Time zone: UTC+3 (TRT)
- Area code: 0324

Dalakdere is a neighbourhood in the municipality and district of Toroslar, Mersin Province, Turkey. Its population is 483 (2022). The distance to Mersin city center is about 15 kilometres (9.3 mi). It is inhabited by Tahtacı.
