= Darısekisi =

- Neighbourhood
- Location in Turkey
- Coordinates: 36°58′N 34°34′E
- Country: Turkey
- Province: Mersin
- District: Toroslar
- Elevation: 820 m (2,690 ft)
- Population (2022): 295
- Time zone: UTC+3 (TRT)
- Area code: 0324

Darısekisi is a neighbourhood in the municipality and district of Toroslar, Mersin Province, Turkey. Its population is 295 (2022). The village is situated in the Taurus Mountains. The distance to Mersin is 35 kilometres (22 mi).
