= Ayvagediği =

Settlement in Turkey

- Neighbourhood
- Location in Turkey
- Coordinates: 37°01′N 34°34′E
- Country: Turkey
- Province: Mersin
- District: Toroslar
- Elevation: 1,200 m (3,900 ft)
- Population (2022): 1,316
- Time zone: UTC+3 (TRT)
- Postal code: 33251
- Area code: 0324

Ayvagediği is a neighbourhood in the municipality and district of Toroslar, Mersin Province, Turkey. Its population is 1,316 (2022). Before the 2013 reorganisation, it was a town (belde).

== Geography ==
Ayvagediği is a mountain town at an average altitude of 1,180 metres (3,870 ft) in a valley on Toros Mountains. It is an example of a series of towns called yayla (just like the neighbouring town Gözne), which are used as summer residences for city dwellers in the Mediterranean and Aegean regions of Turkey.The town is 34 kilometres (21 mi) from Mersin.

== Economy ==
The main agricultural crops are fruits such as grapes, apples, apricots and pears. Another economic activity is domestic tourism or more precisely yayla tourism (active commerce and house rentals during summer months).
