= Gözne Castle =

Medieval castle in Turkey

- Mersin Province, Turkey
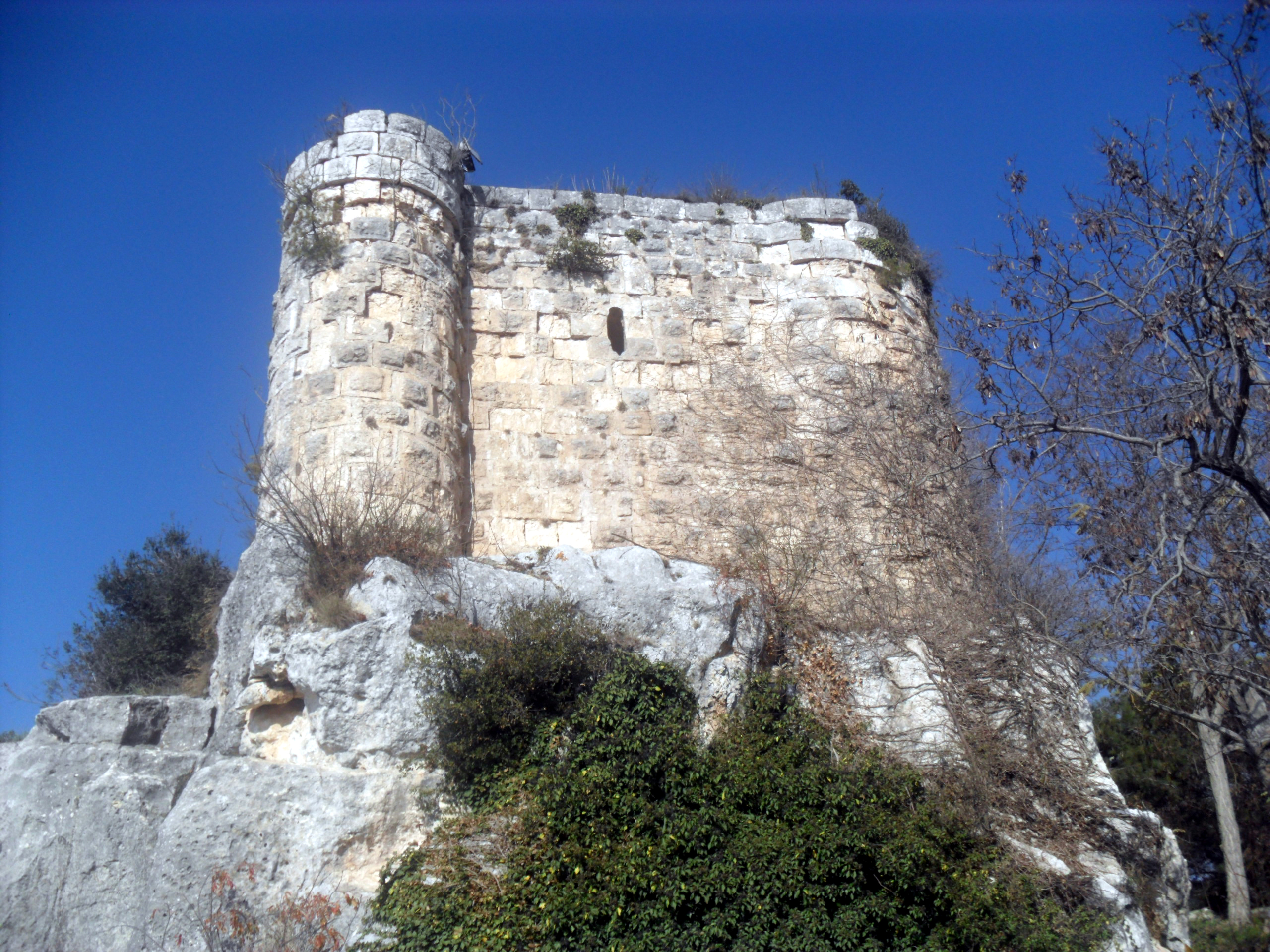
- East building

Site information
- Type: Castle
- Controlled by: Ministry of Culture
- Open to the public: Yes
- Condition: Most of east building still standing.

Location
- Coordinates: 36°59′32″N 34°34′27″E

Site history
- Built by: Byzantine Empire
- Demolished: Part of it

Gözne Castle is a medieval castle in Mersin Province, Turkey.

== Geography ==
The castle is in the Toros Mountains at 36°59′45″N 34°34′40″E. It is situated to the south of Gözne town. It is accessible only from the north i.e. Gözne. Its distance to Mersin is 30 kilometres (19 mi) The road to the castle is an all seasons open road. The altitude of the castle is 1,120 metres (3,670 ft). The castle is open to visits.

== History ==
According to the published archaeological description and plan of this site, this “castle” was probably a fortified estate house. It was built with distinctive Armenian masonry between the 12th and 14th centuries. It also protected a strategic route which linked the Mediterranean coast to Çandır Castle and Lampron, the main seats of Het'umid power in the Armenian Kingdom of Cilicia.

== The buildings ==
This site consists of two fortified chambers without connecting masonry walls. The one at the east is a building with a vaulted rectangular hall, a defensive doorway, four towers, five extremely narrow windows, and a single embrasured loophole. The one at the west is a two-story hexagonal tower-donjon with two doors and three windows. Projecting corbels at the top once supported fighting platforms. Recently, a picnic area was established to the north of the castle. An extensive photographic survey and plan of Gözne Castle was made in 1979.
