= Çopurlu =

- Neighbourhood
- Location in Turkey
- Coordinates: 36°51′29″N 34°34′8″E
- Country: Turkey
- Province: Mersin
- District: Toroslar
- Elevation: 820 m (2,690 ft)
- Population (2022): 763
- Time zone: UTC+3 (TRT)
- Postal code: 33250

Çopurlu is a neighbourhood in the municipality and district of Toroslar, Mersin Province, Turkey. Its population is 763 (2022). It is to the north of Çukurova Motorway (O.51) which connects Mersin to Adana and Tarsus. The distance to Mersin is 25 kilometres (16 mi).
