= Musalı, Mersin =

Musalı
- Neighbourhood
- Location in Turkey
- Coordinates: 36°58′N 34°37′E
- Country: Turkey
- Province: Mersin
- District: Toroslar
- Elevation: 540 m (1,770 ft)
- Population (2022): 873
- Time zone: UTC+3 (TRT)
- Area code: 0324

Musalı is a neighbourhood in the municipality and district of Toroslar, Mersin Province, Turkey. Its population is 873 (2022). It is at the north of the city center.
