= Musalı, Jalilabad =

Musalı
- Municipality
- Location within Azerbaijan
- Coordinates: 39°08′27″N 48°18′09″E
- Country: Azerbaijan
- Rayon: Jalilabad

Population
  - Total: 1,725
- Time zone: UTC+4 (AZT)
  - Summer (DST): UTC+5 (AZT)

Musalı (also, Musa-Kend and Musaly) is a village and municipality in the Jalilabad Rayon of Azerbaijan. It has a population of 1,725.
