= Toroslar =

Secondary municipality in Mersin, Turkey

- District and municipality
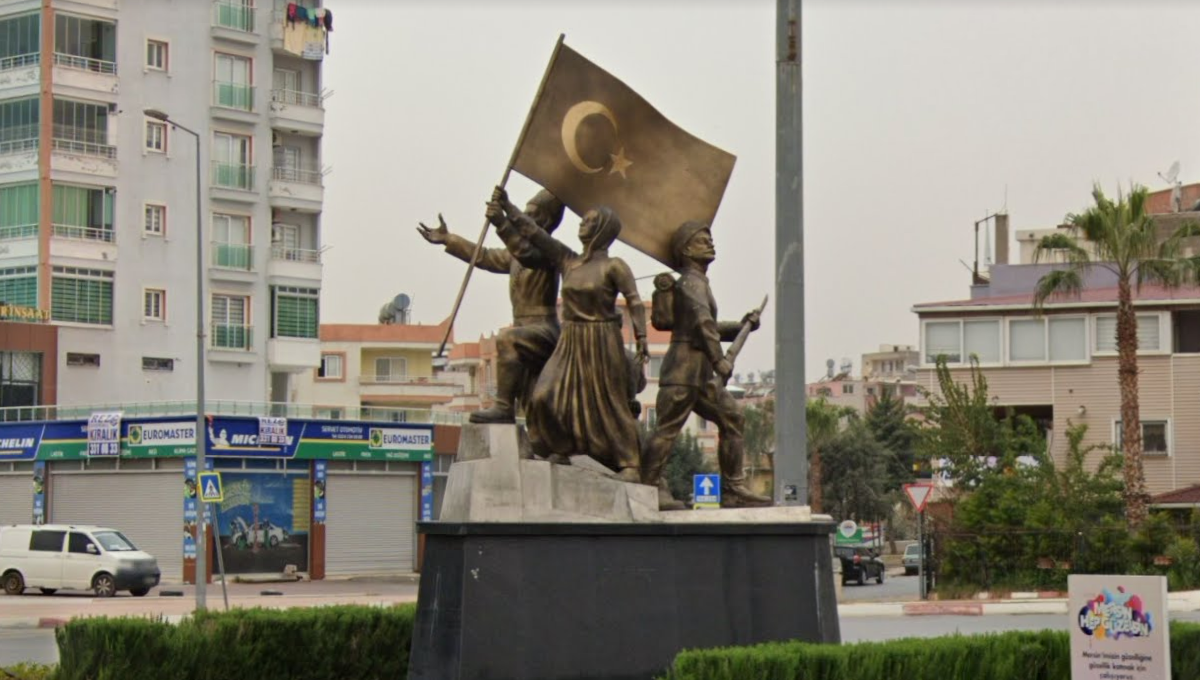
- Kuva-yi Milliye Monument in Toroslar

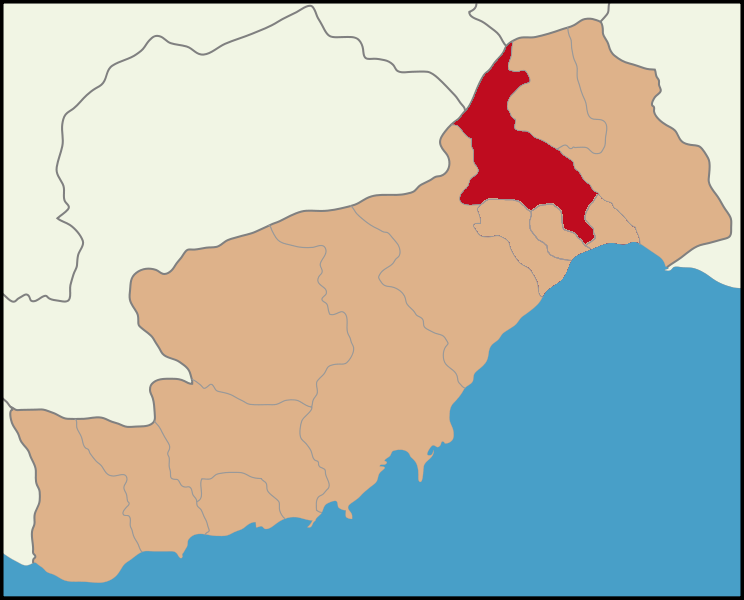
- Map showing Toroslar District in Mersin Province

- Location within Turkey
- Coordinates: 36°49′N 34°37′E
- Country: Turkey
- Province: Mersin

Government
  - Mayor: Abdurrahman Yıldız (CHP)
- Area: 1,075 km^{2} (415 sq mi)
- Population (2022): 319,711
  - Density: 297.4/km^{2} (770.3/sq mi)
- Time zone: UTC+3 (TRT)
- Area code: 0324
- Website: www.toroslar.bel.tr

Toroslar is a municipality and district of Mersin Province, Turkey. Its area is 1,075 km^{2}, and its population is 319,711 (2022). It covers the northern part of the city of Mersin and the adjacent countryside.

== Geography ==
The district of Akdeniz lies in the southeast. Müftü River and the district of Yenişehir lie in the southwest. Southern slopes of Toros mountains lie in the north. Mersin intrafaith cemetery is in Toroslar.

== History ==
Yumuktepe, the ruins of one of the earliest human settlements in Anatolia is in Toroslar. Excavations by John Garstang and Seton Lloyd both of which were directors of the British Institute of Archaeology at Ankara, revealed 23 levels of occupation, the earliest dating from c. 6300 BC. The site however was abandoned during Byzantine Empire period. Modern settlement began in the 19th century.

Originally a part of Mersin municipality, the municipality of Toroslar was established in 1993. In 2008 the district Toroslar was created from part of the former central district of Mersin, along with the districts Mezitli, Akdeniz and Yenişehir. At the same time, the former municipalities Dorukkent, Arpaçsakarlar and Yalınayak were absorbed into the municipality of Toroslar. At the 2013 Turkish local government reorganisation, the rural part of the district was integrated into the municipality, the villages becoming neighbourhoods.

== Population ==
As of 2022, the population of Toroslar is 319,711, which makes it the second-most populous district of Mersin Province after Tarsus. Approximately 30% of Mersin citizens live in Toroslar. The majority of residents are blue-collar workers who work at factories or in the fields.

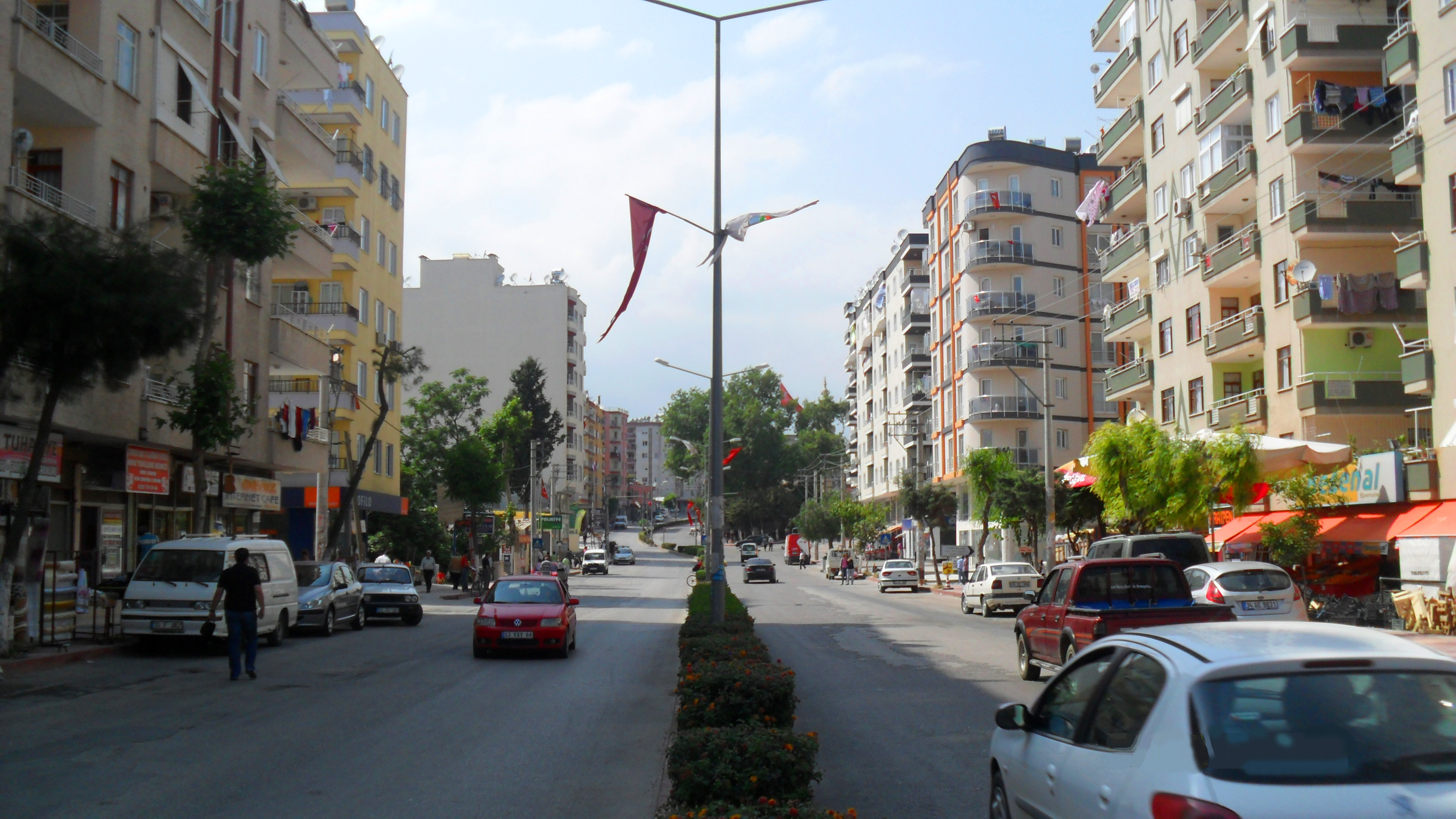
Street scene in Toroslar

== Composition ==
There are 67 neighbourhoods in Toroslar District:

- Akbelen
- Aladağ
- Alanyalı
- Alsancak
- Arpaçsakarlar
- Arslanköy
- Atlılar
- Ayvagediği
- Bekiralanı
- Buluklu
- Çağdaşkent
- Çağlarca
- Çamlıdere
- Çandır
- Çavuşlu
- Çelebili
- Çopurlu
- Çukurova
- Dalakdere
- Darısekisi
- Değirmendere
- Değnek
- Demirtaş
- Doruklu
- Düğdüören
- Evrenli
- Gözne
- Güneykent
- Güzelyayla
- H. Okan Merzeci
- Halkkent
- Hamzabeyli
- Horozlu
- Işıktepe
- Karaisalı
- Kaşlı
- Kavaklıpınar
- Kayrakkeşli
- Kepirli
- Kerimler
- Kızılkaya
- Korucular
- Korukent
- Kurdali
- Kurudere
- Mevlana
- Mithat Toroğlu
- Musalı
- Mustafa Kemal
- Osmaniye
- Portakal
- Resulköy
- Sağlık
- Şahinpınarı
- Selçuklar
- Soğucak
- Tırtar
- Toroslar
- Tozkoparan
- Turgut Türkalp
- Turunçlu
- Yalınayak
- Yavca
- Yeniköy
- Yüksekoluk
- Yusuf Kılıç
- Zeki Ayan

== Sport ==
Sports venues in the district are the 325-seat multi-sport venue, Mersin District 7 Sports Hall, and new-built Toroslar Bocce Facility, both used during the 2013 Mediterranean Games.

== International relations ==
Toroslar is twinned with:

- Uzgen, Kyrgyzstan
