= Musaly, Salyan =

Musaly
- Location within Azerbaijan
- Coordinates: 39°33′N 49°01′E
- Country: Azerbaijan
- Rayon: Salyan
- Time zone: UTC+4 (AZT)
  - Summer (DST): UTC+5 (AZT)

Musaly (also, Musali) is a village in the Salyan Rayon of Azerbaijan.
