= Korucular, Mersin =

Korucular
- Neighbourhood
- Location in Turkey
- Coordinates: 36°56′N 34°32′E
- Country: Turkey
- Province: Mersin
- District: Toroslar
- Elevation: 525 m (1,722 ft)
- Population (2022): 161
- Time zone: UTC+3 (TRT)
- Area code: 0324

Korucular is a neighbourhood in the municipality and district of Toroslar, Mersin Province, Turkey. Its population is 161 (2022). It is situated in the southern slopes of the Toros Mountains to the north of the city center. The distance to Mersin is 17 kilometres (11 mi).
