= Çağlarca, Toroslar =

Çağlarca
- Neighbourhood
- Location in Turkey
- Coordinates: 37°00′N 34°27′E
- Country: Turkey
- Province: Mersin
- District: Toroslar
- Elevation: 990 m (3,250 ft)
- Population (2022): 405
- Time zone: UTC+3 (TRT)
- Area code: 0324

Çağlarca (formerly Suntras) is a neighbourhood in the municipality and district of Toroslar, Mersin Province, Turkey. Its population is 405 (2022). The village is inhabited by Tahtacı.
