= Hamzabeyli =

- Neighbourhood
- Location in Turkey
- Coordinates: 36°51′32″N 34°33′08″E
- Country: Turkey
- Province: Mersin
- District: Toroslar
- Elevation: 160 m (520 ft)
- Population (2022): 213
- Time zone: UTC+3 (TRT)
- Area code: 0324

Hamzabeyli is a neighbourhood in the municipality and district of Toroslar, Mersin Province, Turkey. Its population is 213 (2022). It is situated along a tributary of Müftü River and has a small waterfall on the river. The distance to Mersin is 15 kilometres (9.3 mi).
