= Çandır Castle =

Archaeological site in Turkey

- Mersin Province, Turkey
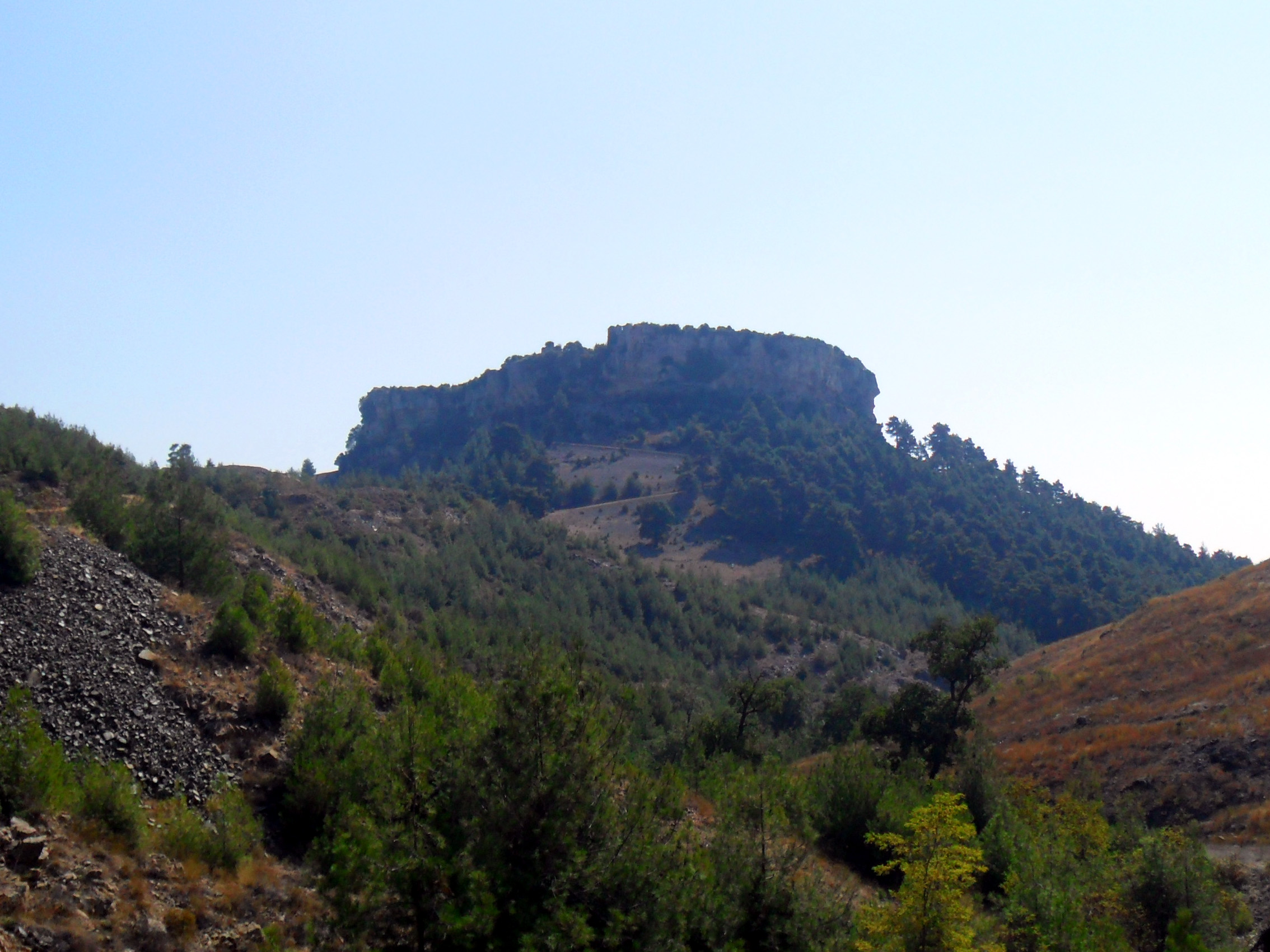
- The mesa from west

Site information
- Type: Fortress
- Open to the public: Yes
- Condition: A part of the church and residence are partially standing.

Location
- Location within Turkey
- Coordinates: 37°01′11″N 34°36′56″E

Site history
- Built by: Byzantines and Armenians
- Demolished: Most of it

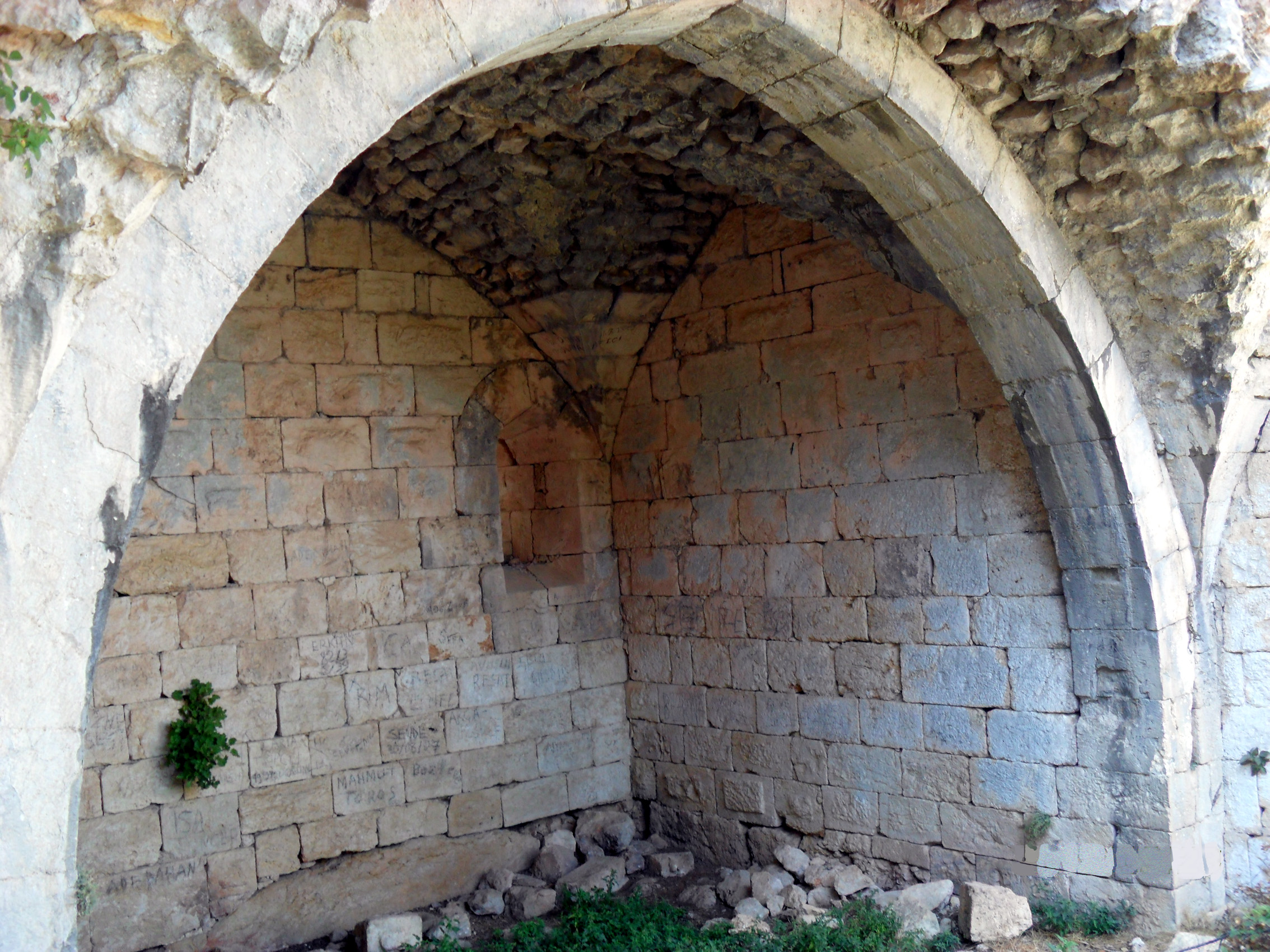
A chamber inside the castle

Çandır Castle (Turkish: Çandır Kalesi) the medieval Armenian site of Paperon (Armenian: Պապեռոն, also known as Barbaron), is a fortification in Mersin Province, Turkey.

== Geography ==
The castle is in the Toros Mountains at 37°01′11″N 34°36′56″E. It is situated to the east of Ayvagediği and Gözne Castle and to the north of Mersin. The distance to Mersin is about 40 kilometres (25 mi). The castle shares the same name with a village lying to the south (see Çandır, Mersin). It is built on a plateau at an altitude of 1,125 metres (3,691 ft).

== History ==
Most historians believe that the castle may be the castle of Paperon which is mentioned in conjunction with Byzantine Emperor Zeno in the 5th century. Zeno, who was an Isaurian, built the castle and spent a part of his refuge years in the castle. Alishan, writing in the 19th century, identifies Paperon with the Byzantine fort of Papirion ("Παπιρίον"), which is first mentioned in conjunction with the Byzantine emperor Zeno the Isaurian in the 5th century. However, there is no archeological evidence to support this and the identification is questioned. The site rose to prominence during the Armenian Kingdom of Cilicia from the 12th through the 14th centuries, when it was the seat of Het’umid power, and the surviving structures date from this period. The fortress controlled two roads to Central Anatolia, one of which leads to the other main Het’umid stronghold, Lampron. Çandır Castle was the residence of many Armenian nobles and kings as well as the home of the remarkable scholar and diplomat, Sempad the Constable.

== The castle ==
In 1979 the site was surveyed by Robert Edwards, who, in 1987, published an archaeological and historical assessment of the site along with an accurate plan. The only entrance into the castle is up a partially vaulted staircase of approximately 140 steps that is cut into the vertical side of the plateau. In parallel to the steps is an inclined plane which was probably used for haulage. The castle is large, but most of the walls as well as the buildings are in ruins. The two most impressive structures are a two-story residence and a church, both of which are constructed with beautifully executed polished stones. This church, which now only partially survives, was, according to its dedicatory inscription in Armenian, completed in 1251 by Sempad the Constable to honor his father. This inscription was on the south exterior wall of the church; it survived at least into the mid-1930s, but no trace of it existed by 1946.

== Trivia ==
A small house has been built inside the castle for a fire warden appointed by the Ministry of Forestry
