= Çandır, Toroslar =

Çandır
- Neighbourhood
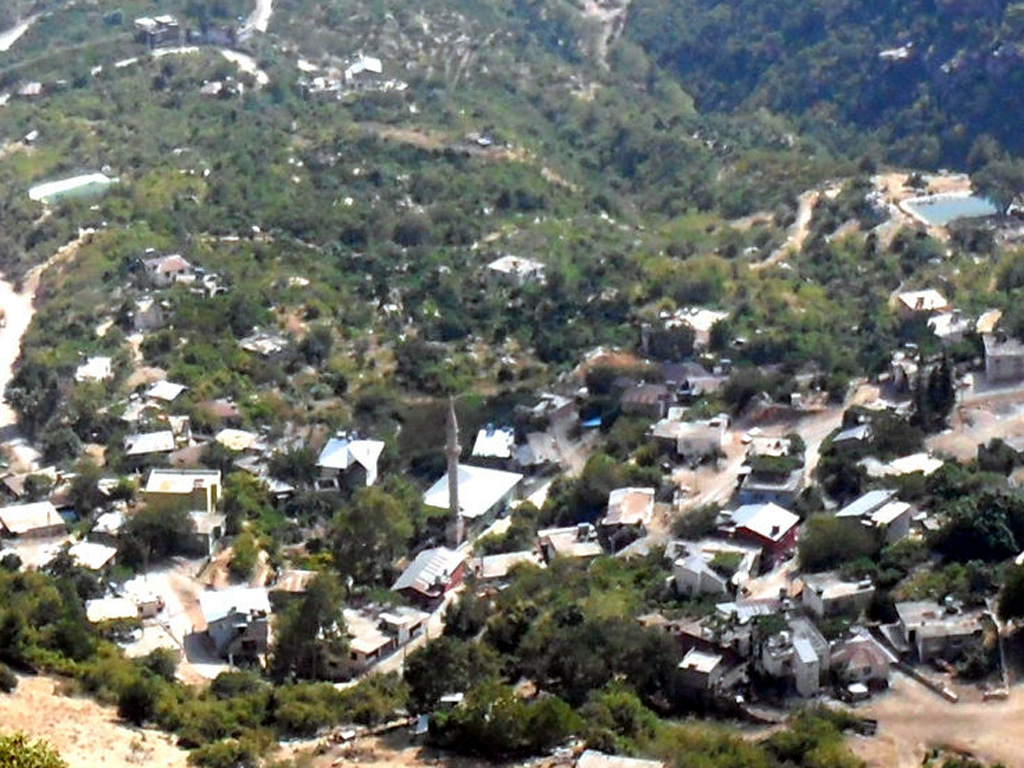

- Location within Turkey
- Coordinates: 37°01′N 34°37′E
- Country: Turkey
- Province: Mersin
- District: Toroslar
- Elevation: 780 m (2,560 ft)
- Population (2022): 319
- Time zone: UTC+3 (TRT)
- Area code: 0324

Çandır is a neighbourhood in the municipality and district of Toroslar, Mersin Province, Turkey. Its population is 319 (2022). It is in the Toros Mountains. The distance to Mersin is 37 kilometres (23 mi). The village is famous for the medieval castle to the north of the village (see Çandır Castle).
