= Alanyalı =

- Neighbourhood
- Location in Turkey
- Coordinates: 37°05′N 34°31′E
- Country: Turkey
- Province: Mersin
- District: Toroslar
- Elevation: 1,330 m (4,360 ft)
- Population (2022): 132
- Time zone: UTC+3 (TRT)
- Area code: 0324

Alanyalı is a neighbourhood in the municipality and district of Toroslar, Mersin Province, Turkey. Its population is 132 (2022). It is situated in the Taurus Mountains. The distance to Mersin is 44 kilometres (27 mi).
