= Güzelyayla =

Settlement in Turkey

- Neighbourhood
- Location in Turkey
- Coordinates: 37°01′N 34°29′E
- Country: Turkey
- Province: Mersin
- District: Toroslar
- Elevation: 900 m (3,000 ft)
- Population (2022): 893
- Time zone: UTC+3 (TRT)
- Postal code: 33251
- Area code: 0324

Güzelyayla is a neighbourhood in the municipality and district of Toroslar, Mersin Province, Turkey. Its population is 893 (2022). Before the 2013 reorganisation, it was a town (belde).

== Geography ==
Güzelyayla is a mountain town on the Taurus Mountains. Highway distance to Mersin is approximately 40 km (25 mi). The altitude of the town is between 900 m (3,000 ft) and 1,100 m (3,600 ft).

== History ==
The earliest settlers were the members of a Turkmen tribe named Sarıkeçili in the 15th century. Two nearby settlements used by the tribe (Evci and Kızılbağ) later on were merged and they were declared the town of Güzelyayla in 1998.

== Economy ==
The main crops are apple, grape and especially peach. Traditional animal husbandry is another economic activity. Tourism at the moment plays only a minor role in the economy of the town. Being a mountain town (yayla) Güzelyayla attracts city dwellers for spending summer holidays.
