= Gözne =

- Neighbourhood
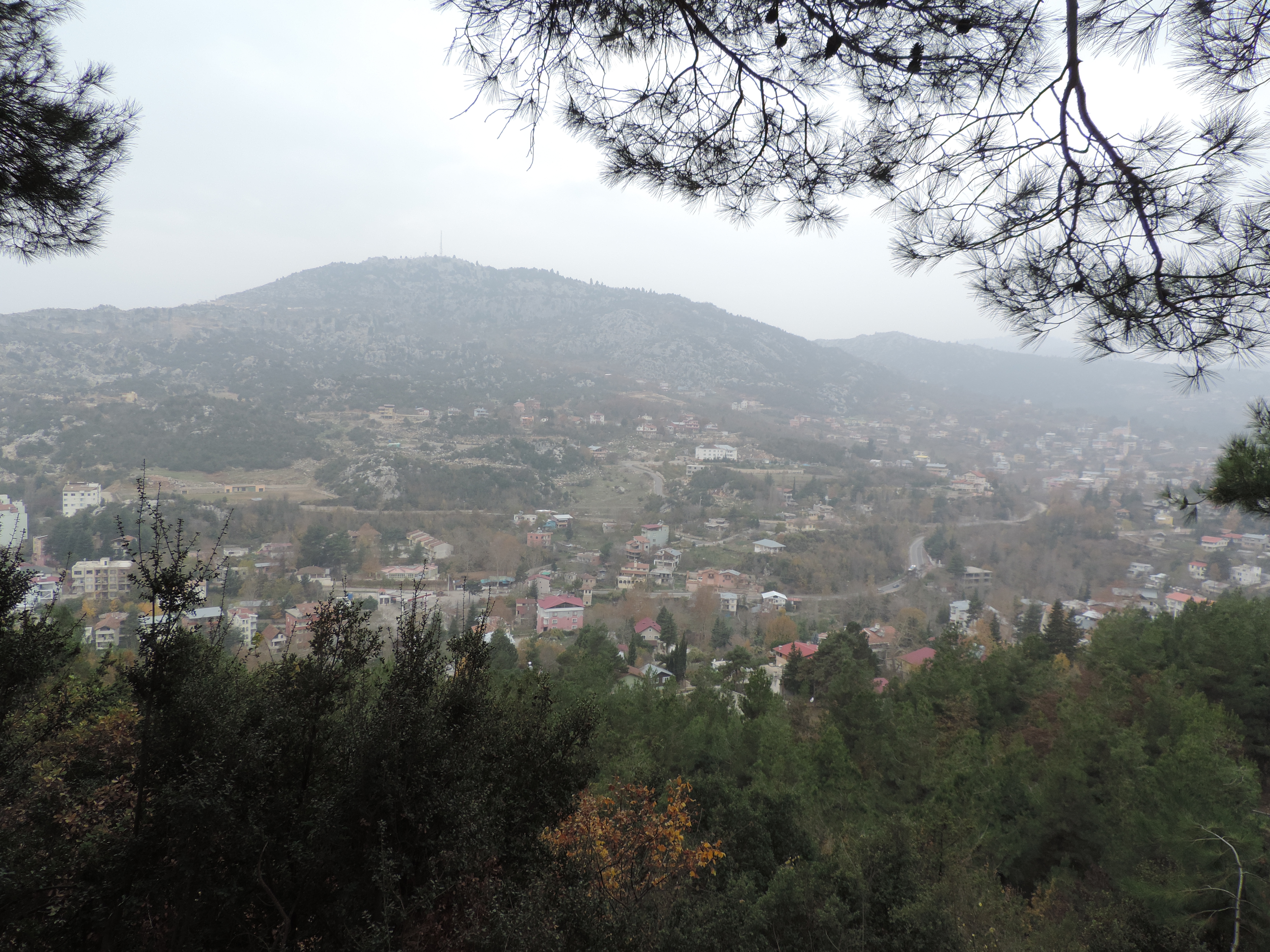
- Gözne town, seen from the Gözne Castle

- Location within Turkey
- Coordinates: 37°00′N 34°34′E
- Country: Turkey
- Province: Mersin
- District: Toroslar
- Elevation: 1,045 m (3,428 ft)
- Population (2022): 1,505
- Time zone: UTC+3 (TRT)
- Postal code: 33251
- Area code: 0324

Gözne is a neighbourhood in the municipality and district of Toroslar, Mersin Province, Turkey. Its resident population is 1,505 (2022), however, it is much higher in the summer. Before the 2013 reorganisation, it was a town (belde).

== Geography ==
Gözne is 28 kilometres (17 mi) north of Mersin. It is situated in the southern slopes of the Taurus Mountains. The average altitude is 1,045 metres (3,428 ft). In some locations of the town, both Mersin and the Mediterranean Sea can be viewed. The road between Mersin and Gözne is quite well cared and accessible whole year, the average travel time being about 30 minutes.

== History ==
It is known that there was a prehistoric settlement in the area which now is Gözne. So far, only one inscription has been unearthed which is in Aramaic. Gözne Castle was built in the Middle Ages.

The modern settlement in Gözne dates back to 19th century when people from Mersin and Tarsus began to use the surrounding as a summer resort (Turkish: yayla).

During the Turkish War of Independence, Mersin and Tarsus were under French occupation and Gözne was one of the centers of the nationalists. After the liberation of Mersin in 1922, Gözne became a village and then a town in 1956.

== Gözne as summer resort ==
Both being Mediterranean cities, Mersin and Tarsus are hot during the summers months. So it was a practice among the people to migrate to Gözne and similar towns in summer months. During the 19th century and early 20th century, usually the landlords stayed in Mersin and met with their families on the weekends. However, after the roads were constructed it is just a short drive from Mersin, and it is possible to spend the night in Gözne and work in Mersin. Nevertheless, after the beginning of beach tourism and other touristic activities as well as the advance in climatization technology, Gözne is not as popular as it used to be.
