= Atlılar, Mersin =

Atlılar Sadiye
- Neighbourhood
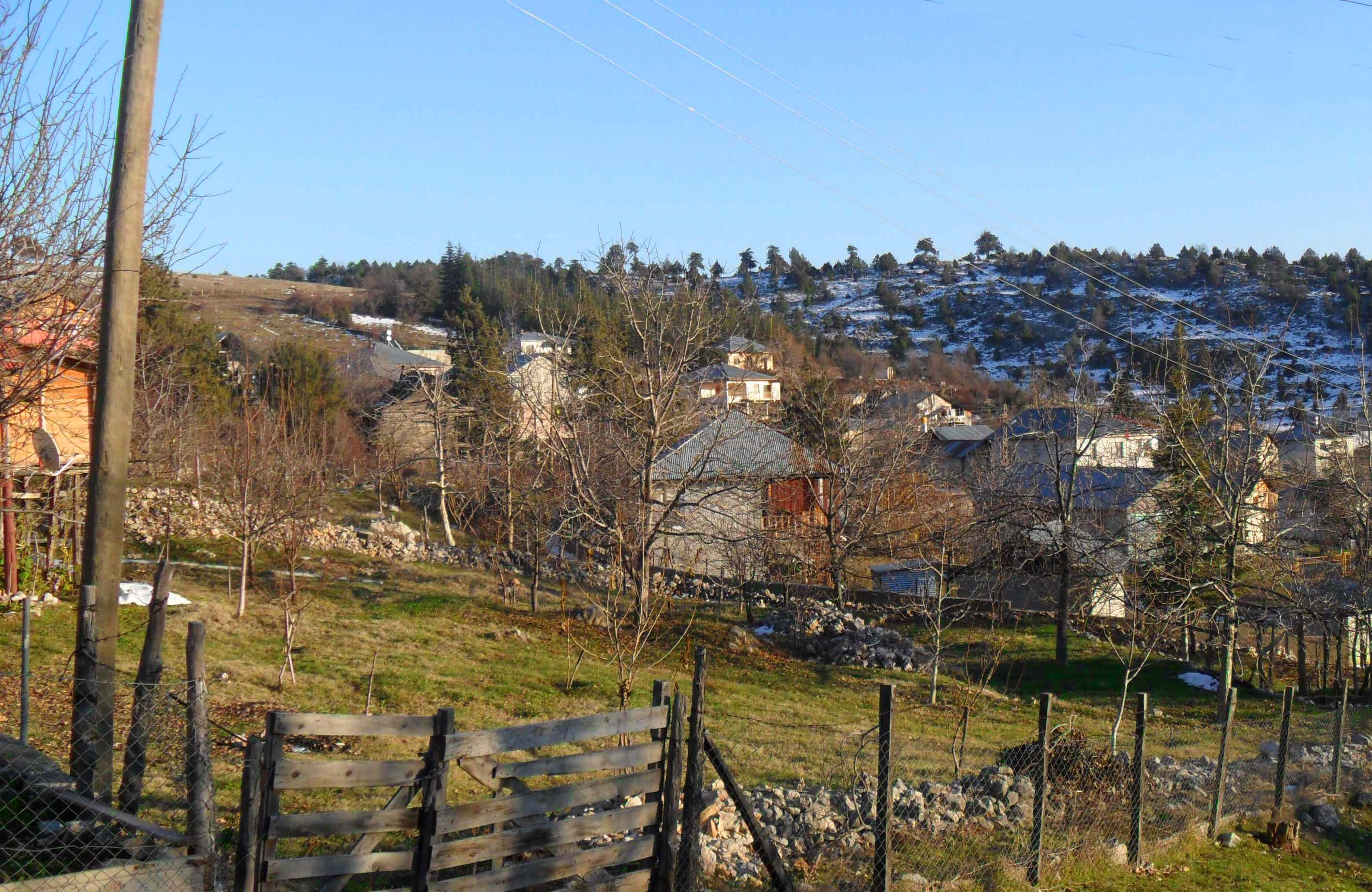

- Location within Turkey
- Coordinates: 37°05′N 34°27′E
- Country: Turkey
- Province: Mersin
- District: Toroslar
- Elevation: 1,425 m (4,675 ft)
- Population (2022): 155
- Time zone: UTC+3 (TRT)
- Area code: 0324

Atlılar (formerly Sadiye) is a neighbourhood in the municipality and district of Toroslar, Mersin Province, Turkey. Its population is 155 (2022). It is a high-altitude village in the Taurus Mountains. Distance to Mersin is 65 kilometres (40 mi).

The village inhabitants are mostly of Circassian (Adyghe) origin. Following Russian–Circassian War in 1864, Adyghe people were expelled from Caucasus, their homeland, to the Ottoman Empire where they were settled in various regions in the Ottoman Empire. The earlier settlement of Circassians in Mersin was Mezitli at the Mediterranean Sea side. But they asked for cooler and high-altitude places and finally they were settled in this village. They named the village after Sadiye, a Circassian born female member of the Ottoman palace who helped them to find their new home. In the earlier years of Turkish Republic the village was specialized in horse breeding and accordingly it was renamed Atlılar ("Horsemen"). Presently Atlılar economy depends on cherry farming and cattle breeding.
