= Arslanköy =

Town in Mersin Province, Turkey

Arslanköy Efrenk
- Neighbourhood
- Location in Turkey
- Coordinates: 37°01′N 34°17′E
- Country: Turkey
- Province: Mersin
- District: Toroslar
- Elevation: 1,475 m (4,839 ft)
- Population (2022): 1,683
- Time zone: UTC+3 (TRT)
- Postal code: 33251
- Area code: 0324

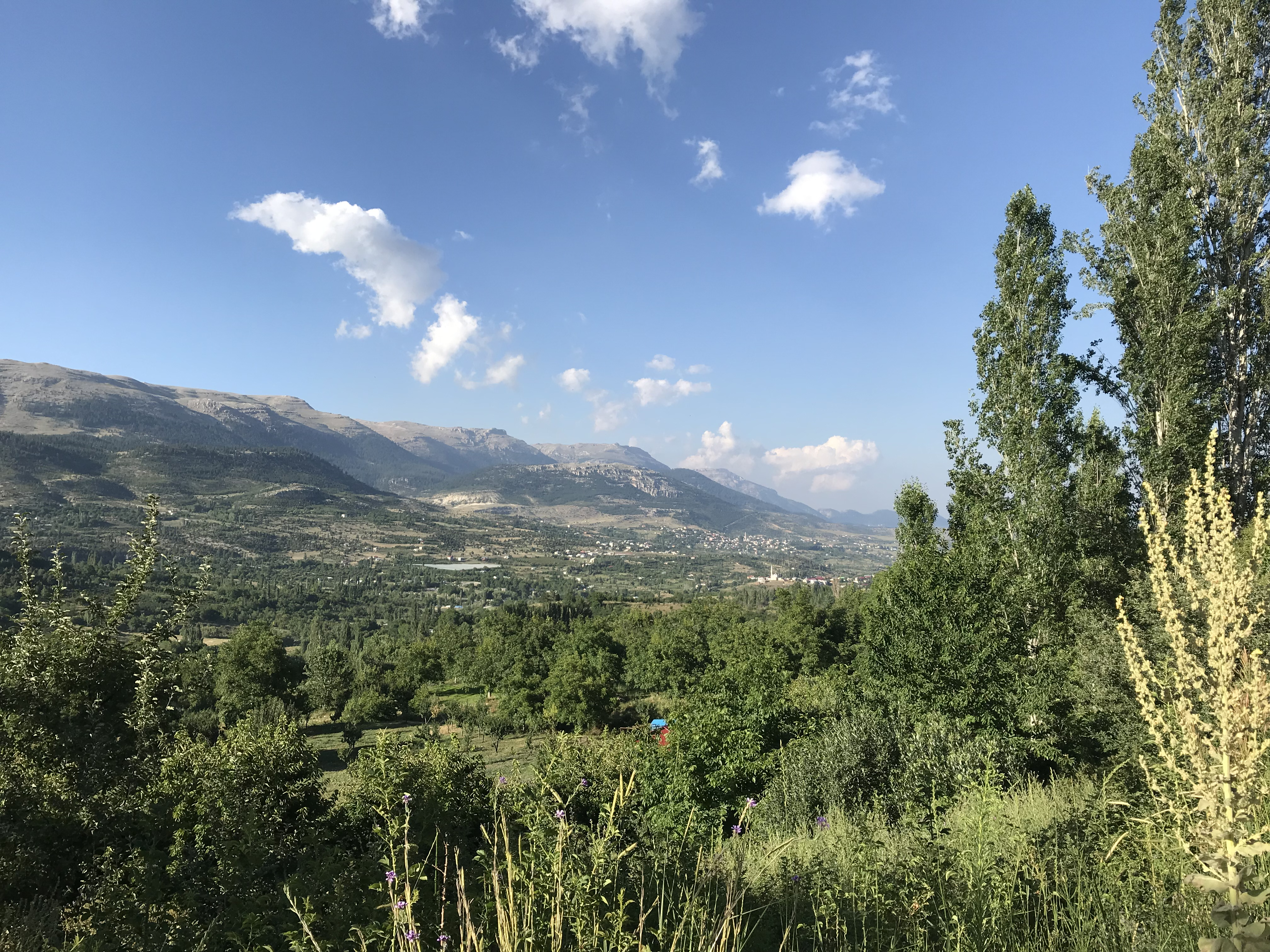
Arslanköy, Mersin province

Arslanköy (also called Efrenk) is a neighbourhood in the municipality and district of Toroslar, Mersin Province, Turkey. Its population is 1,683 (2022). Before the 2013 reorganisation, it was a town (belde).

== Geography ==
Arslanköy is a mountain town situated in the Toros Mountains at an altitude of approximately 1,475 metres (4,839 ft). The distance by road to Mersin is 51 kilometres (32 mi).

== History ==
Located about 3 kilometers south from the town is a small garrison fort that consists of several walls and a gate that block access to the summit of a limestone outcrop. The masonry indicates that it dates from the early Byzantine period with additions in the 12th or 13th century during the period of the Armenian Kingdom of Cilicia. It is located in the Taurus Mountains near the junction of several strategic roads which lead from both Çandır Castle (Papeṙōn) and the Mediterranean Sea to Cappadocia. The fortification was surveyed in 1979.

Among the early settlers were nomadic Oghuz Turks (Turkmens) who began to use the vicinity as a summer camp (Turkish: yayla) in the 14th century. Later a village was established. Some of the most influential folk poets like Karacaoğlan of the 17th century and Dadaloğlu of the 19th century are believed to have spent some years in Arslanköy.

Arslanköy previously an ambiguous village, made news in 1947 local elections. The candidate of the opposition won the elections for village headman (Turkish: muhtar). A civil servant supporting the governing party, tried to alter the official minutes . But residents of the village resisted and fought for their preference.

Arslanköy was declared a seat of township in 1954.

== Economy ==
Owing to high altitude, Arslanköy is one of the coolest parts of the province. The main crops are cereals and some fruits such as apples and peaches.
