= Değirmendere, Mersin =

Değirmendere
- Neighbourhood
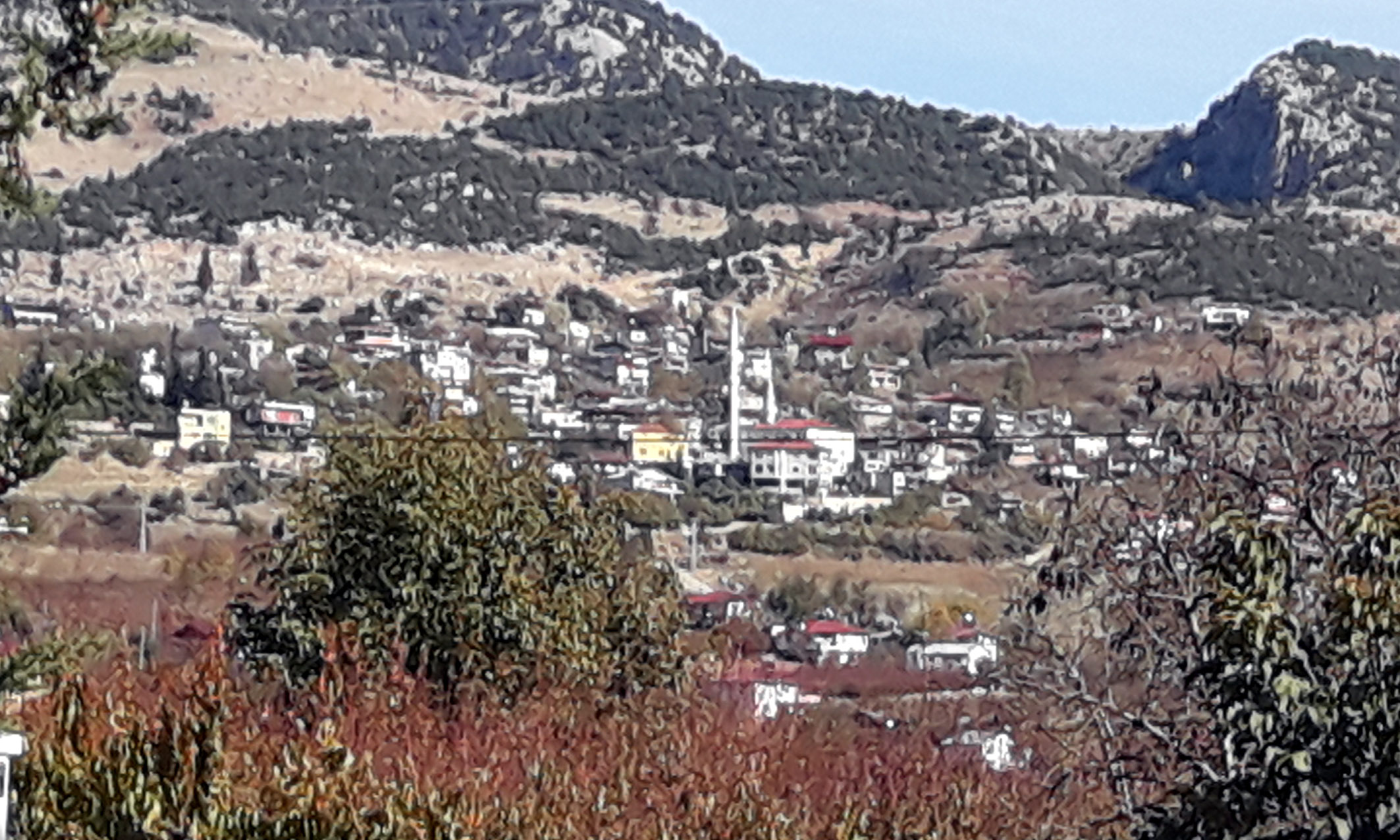

- Location within Turkey
- Coordinates: 37°04′N 34°32′E
- Country: Turkey
- Province: Mersin
- District: Toroslar
- Elevation: 895 m (2,936 ft)
- Population (2022): 713
- Time zone: UTC+3 (TRT)
- Area code: 0324

Değirmendere is a neighbourhood in the municipality and district of Toroslar, Mersin Province, Turkey. Its population is 713 (2022). Değirmendere is situated on a high plateau of the Taurus Mountains. The distance to the city of Mersin is about 40 kilometres (25 mi).
