= Cemilli Castle =

Castle in Turkey

- Mersin Province, Turkey
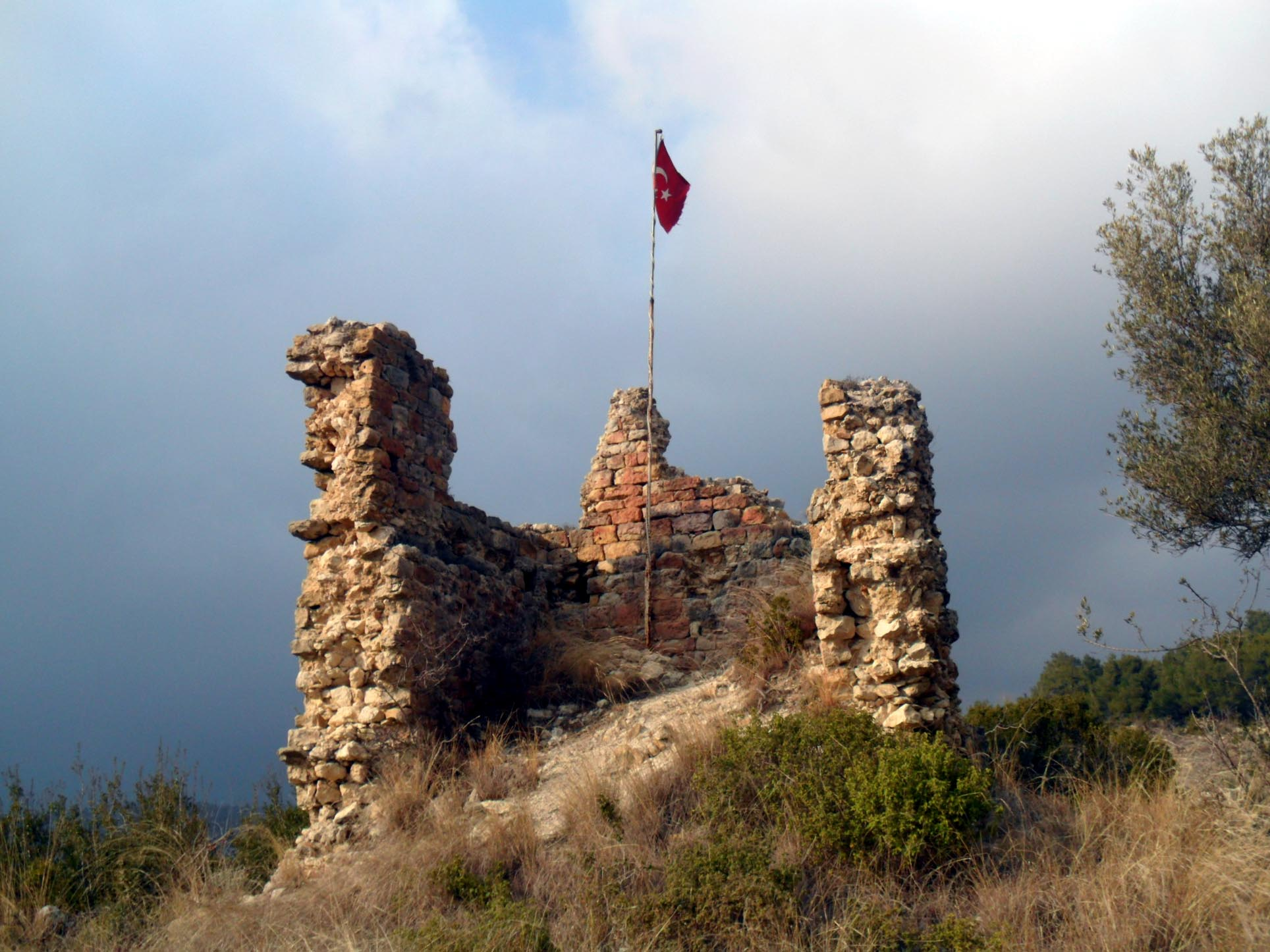
- From the south

Site information
- Type: Small castle
- Open to the public: Yes

Location
- Coordinates: 36°48′09″N 34°27′10″E

Site history
- Built by: Byzantine Empire (?)
- Materials: Stone
- Demolished: Most of it

Cemilli Castle (Turkish: Cemilli Kalesi, also called Kaleburnu Castle) is a medieval castle (or an observation tower) in the rural area of Mersin in southern Turkey.

== Geography ==
The castle is in the southern slopes of Toros Mountains at 36°48′09″N 34°27′09″E. It is situated to the east of Cemilli village and to the west of Mersin. Its distance to Mersin is 30 kilometres (19 mi). Its altitude is 540 m (1,770 ft). It overlooks the village and the road connecting Mersin to Fındıkpınarı.

== Building ==
Both Cemilli and Kaleburnu are Turkish names. The original name of the castle is not known. It is a small medieval age castle. It was built probably to control the road to north. Presently most of the building has been demolished. There are cracked pieces of ceramic coating from the Byzantine, Seljuk and Ottoman eras around the castle.
