= Karahacılı, Mersin =

Karahacılı
- Neighbourhood
- Location in Turkey
- Coordinates: 36°48′58″N 34°29′13″E
- Country: Turkey
- Province: Mersin
- District: Yenişehir
- Elevation: 165 m (541 ft)
- Population (2022): 761
- Time zone: UTC+3 (TRT)
- Postal code: 33112
- Area code: 0324
- Website: Village page

Karahacılı is a neighbourhood in the municipality and district of Yenişehir, Mersin Province, Turkey. Its population is 761 (2022). It is situated in the valley of Mezitli River between Bozön and Turunçlu. The distance to Mersin is 15 kilometres (9.3 mi). Main crops of the village are fruits and vegetables.
