= Insu =

Insu may refer to:

- İnsu, village in Yenişehir District, Turkey
- Insu-dong, neighbourhood of Gangbuk-gu, Seoul, South Korea
- In-soo (Korean name), Korean given name
- Queen Insu (1437–1504)

INSU may refer to:

- Insituform, British provider of trenchless technologies for gravity and pressure pipelines
- Institut national des sciences de l'univers (National Institute for Earth Sciences and Astronomy) of the French National Centre for Scientific Research
