= Mezitli River =

Turkey rivulet

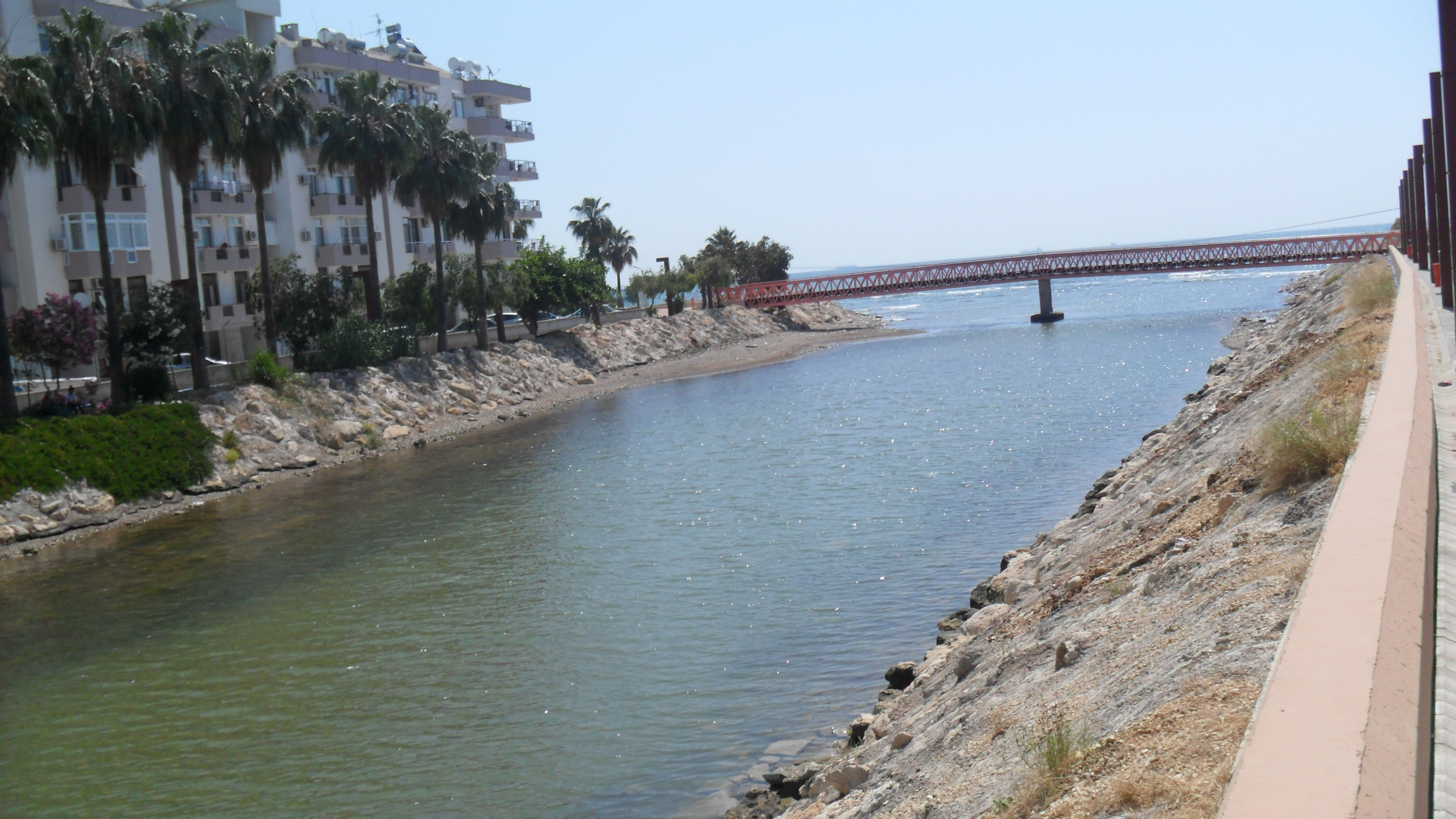
Mezitli River, river mouth

Mezitli River (Liparis of the antiquity) is a rivulet in Mersin Province, Turkey

The river flows in the mid-southern portion of the Toros Mountains from north to south. It is a short river and the birds flight distance between the headwaters and the mouth is about 20 kilometres (12 mi). Its drainage basin is 166 square kilometres (64 sq mi) and during the rainy seasons the length may increase by the contributions of irregular-flow tributaries. Although the river is small it had formed a valley of its own. The villages of Uzunkaş, Turunçlu, Karahacılı and Bozön are in the valley. It flows to Mediterranean Sea in Mersin (Mezitli Municipality) at 36°45′N 34°33′E. In his book titled Voyage Dans La Cilicie et Dans Les Montagnes Du Taurus in 1853, the French Orientalist Charles-Victor Langlois wrote that there were brier roses, laurels and grape plants in the valley. But presently the valley is a center of citrus and pomegranate horticulture.
