= Emirler =

Emirler may refer to:

- Emirler, Bigadiç, a village
- Emirler, Boğazkale
- Emirler, Cide, a village in Cide district
- Emirler, Gölbaşı, a village in Gölbaşı district of Ankara Province, Turkey
- Emirler, Haymana, a village in Haymana district of Ankara Province, Turkey
- Emirler, Mengen, a village in Mengen district of Bolu Province, Turkey
- Emirler, Mersin, a village in Yenişehir district of Mersin Province, Turkey
- Emirler, Gölköy, a village in Gölköy district of Ordu Province, Turkey
- Emirler, Tarsus, a village in Tarsus district of Mersin Province, Turkey
- Emirler, Ulukışla, a village in Ulukışla district of Niğde Province, Turkey
- A former name of the village Kavyli, Greece
