= Liparis =

Liparis may refer to:

- Liparis (amphipod), an invalid synonym of the skeleton shrimp genus Caprella
- Liparis (fish), a genus of snailfishes
- Liparis (plant), a genus of orchids
- Liparis was the ancient name of the Mezitli River
