= Mezitli Producer Women's Market =

Market in Mersin, Turkey

Mezitli Producer Women's Market (Turkish: Mezitli Üretici Kadın Pazarı) is an open market initiative in Mersin, Turkey.

Mezitli is one of the four second level municipalities in Mersin. On 25 August 2014 Mezitli mayor Neşet Turhan established the first women's producer market in Mezitli. The number of women's producer markets is 9 in Mezitli city or in the villages of Mezitli as of September 2018. In these markets, only the women are allowed to sell the products they produce. These may be agricultural products, food, knitting work or bijouterie. The aim of the project is to ensure women's financial independence. According to Guangzhou Award page "The project contributes to greater gender equality and helps strengthen policies and legislation". The municipality supports the producer women with tax immunity, playground for the children and even open-space-air conditioning.

== Guangzhou Innovation Award ==
The Guangzhou International Award for Urban Innovation (the Guangzhou Award) is co-sponsored by the United Cities and Local Governments (UCLG), the World Association of the Major Metropolises According to Eurocities page "The objective of the contest is to award the innovations cities / local governments that implement ongoing or recently completed (within the past two years) initiatives, furthering city-to-city learning and exchange in support of the implementation of global agendas (especially the “2030 Agenda for Sustainable Development” and the “New Urban Agenda”)". In 2018, Mezitli municipality participated in the contest among 313 others and Producer Women's Market Project was awarded in Innovation category.
