= Doğançay =

Doğançay may refer to:

- Doğançay Museum, Turkey's first contemporary art museum
- Doğançay, Mardin, village in the district of Midyat, Mardin Province, Turkey
- Doğançay, Mersin, village in the district of Mezitli, Mersin Province, Turkey

== People with the surname ==
- Adil Doğançay (1900–1990), Turkish painter and father of painter Burhan Dogançay
- Burhan Doğançay (1929–2013), Turkish-American artist
