= Tece Creek =

Stream in Mersin Province, Turkey

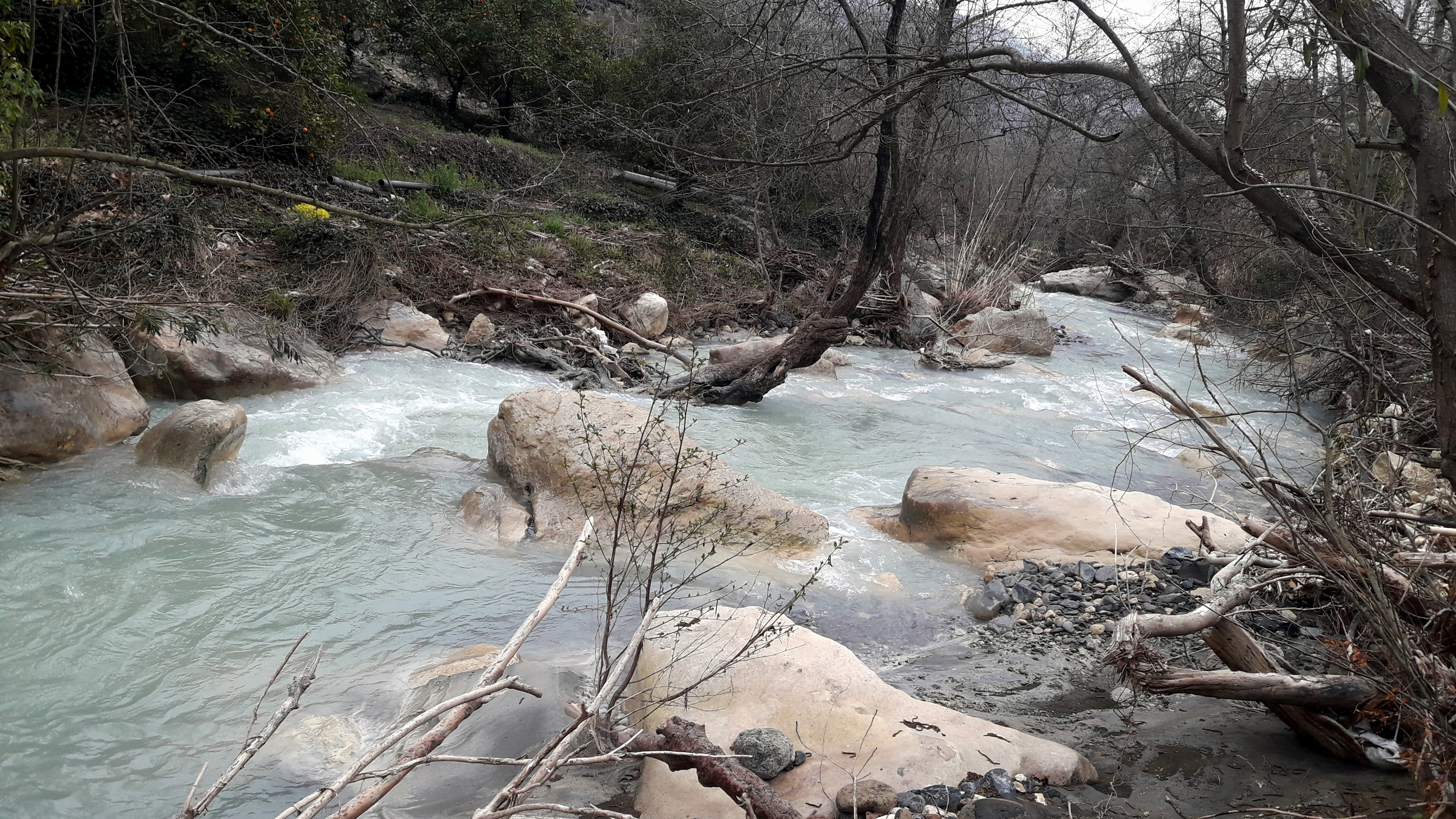
Tece creek in Toros Mountains

Tece Creek is a creek in Mersin Province, Turkey. Its headwaters are around Fındıkpınarı in the Toros Mountains. In upper reaches it is also called Fındık Creek. It flows to Mediterranean Sea at 36°41′54″N 34°27′40″E. Tece town (now a neighborhood of Mersin) is by the creek.
