= Zeybekler =

- Neighbourhood
- Location in Turkey
- Coordinates: 36°52′N 34°20′E
- Country: Turkey
- Province: Mersin
- District: Mezitli
- Elevation: 875 m (2,871 ft)
- Population (2022): 169
- Time zone: UTC+3 (TRT)
- Area code: 0324

Zeybekler is a neighbourhood in the municipality and district of Mezitli, Mersin Province, Turkey. Its population is 169 (2022). It is situated in the southern slopes of the Taurus Mountains. It lies close to Kocayer village to the north. The distance to Mersin is about 40 kilometres (25 mi). Due to frequent landslides the village is planned to be relocated. The village is known as a fruit (especially peach) producer.
