= Kuzucubelen =

- Neighbourhood
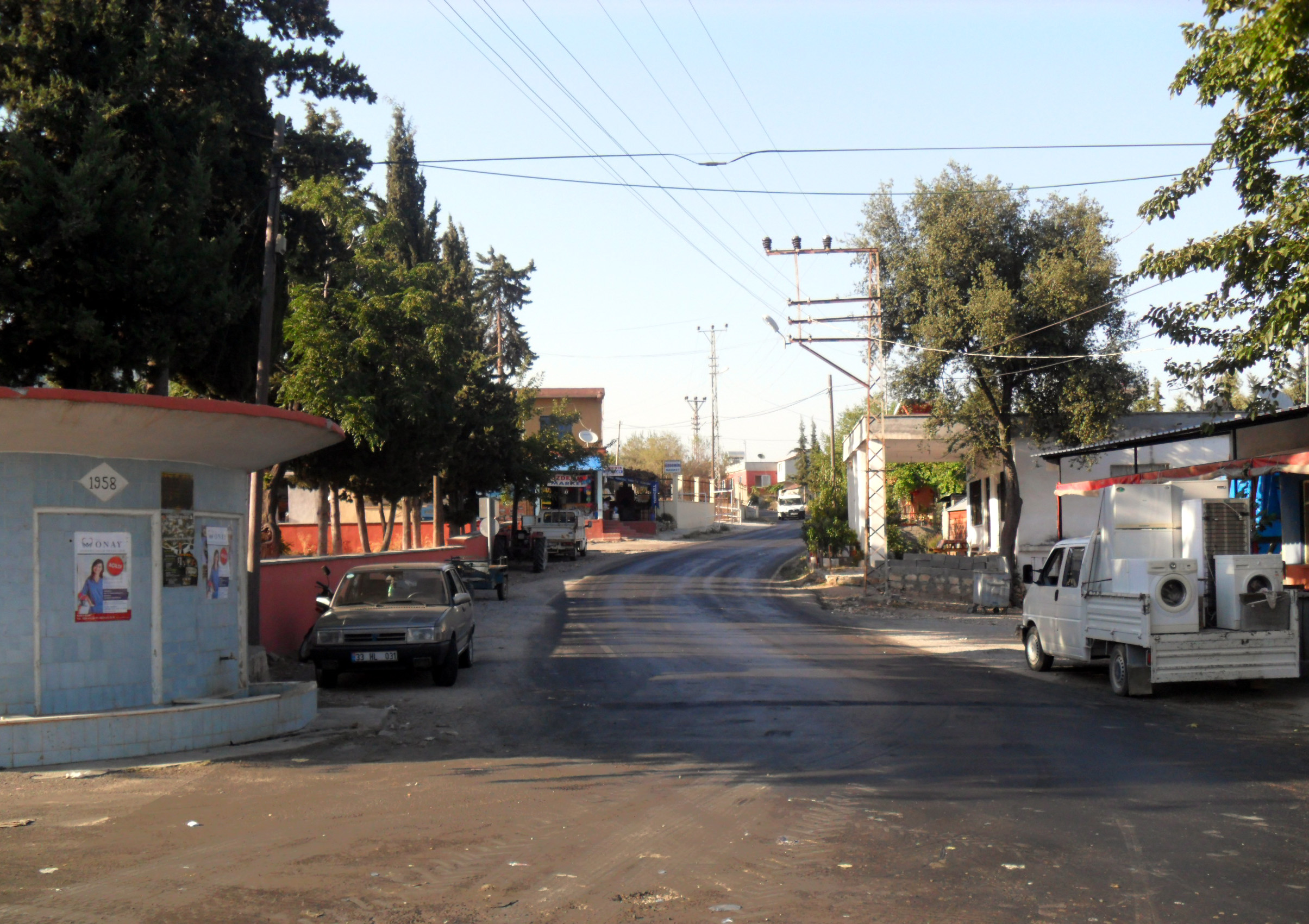

- Location within Turkey
- Coordinates: 36°50′N 34°26′E
- Country: Turkey
- Province: Mersin
- District: Mezitli
- Elevation: 700 m (2,300 ft)
- Population (2022): 517
- Time zone: UTC+3 (TRT)
- Area code: 0324

Kuzucubelen is a neighbourhood in the municipality and district of Mezitli, Mersin Province, Turkey. Its population is 517 (2022). It is situated in the Toros Mountains, 28 kilometres (17 mi) away from Mersin. The village is inhabited by Tahtacı.

Near the town is a two-storey watchtower with a stone vaulted lower-level and three impressive embrasures. The masonry and design indicate that it was built in the 12th or 13th century during the period of the Armenian Kingdom of Cilicia. The fortification was surveyed in 1981. Located between Tece Castle and Başnalar this site guarded a route from the Mediterranean Sea to Cappadocia.
