= Demirışık, Mezitli =

Demirışık
- Neighbourhood
- Location in Turkey
- Coordinates: 36°57′N 34°25′E
- Country: Turkey
- Province: Mersin
- District: Mezitli
- Elevation: 1,010 m (3,310 ft)
- Population (2022): 353
- Time zone: UTC+3 (TRT)
- Area code: 0324

Demirışık is a neighbourhood in the municipality and district of Mezitli, Mersin Province, Turkey. Its population is 353 (2022). It is situated in the forests of the Taurus Mountains. Its distance to Mersin is 51 kilometres (32 mi). The main economic activity is peach horticulture. Apples, plums, and cherries are other crops. During winters, some residents work as wood choppers.

== Notable native ==
- Özdemir İnce, poet and columnist
