= Tepeköy, Mersin =

Tepeköy
- Neighbourhood
- Location in Turkey
- Coordinates: 36°55′N 34°17′E
- Country: Turkey
- Province: Mersin
- District: Mezitli
- Elevation: 1,375 m (4,511 ft)
- Population (2022): 1,797
- Time zone: UTC+3 (TRT)

Tepeköy is a neighbourhood in the municipality and district of Mezitli, Mersin Province, Turkey. Its population is 1,797 (2022). Before the 2013 reorganisation, it was a town (belde).

Mostly surrounded by the Toros Mountains, Tepeköy is a mountain town at an average altitude of about 1,375 metres (4,511 ft). Its main road leads to Fındıkpınarı another town to the east. The distance to Mersin is 56 kilometres (35 mi). The village was founded by Turkmens. In 1994 it was declared a township.
