= Tece Castle =

Castle ruins in the Mersin

- Tece Kalesi
- Mersin Province, Turkey
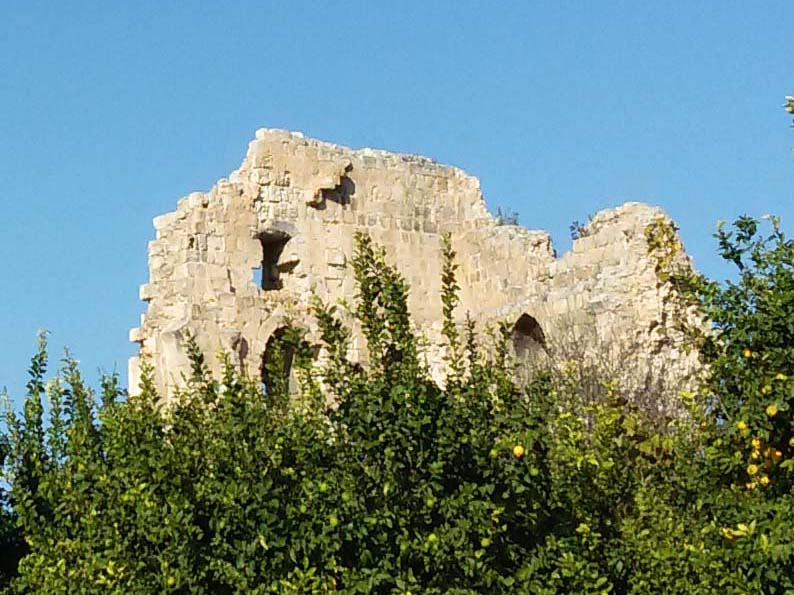
- Tece Castle from the southwest

Site information
- Type: Fortress

Location
- Location within Turkey
- Coordinates: 36°43′N 34°27′E

Site history
- Built by: Roman Empire (?)
- Materials: Stone
- Demolished: Most of it

Tece Castle (Turkish: Tece Kalesi) is a ruined castle in Mersin Province, southern Turkey.

== Location ==
The castle is in the Tece suburb of Mezitli which is a secondary municipality of Mersin. It is about 20 km (12 mi) from Mersin city center.

== History ==
There is no record about the origin of the castle. However, judging from the architecture, it was probably a late Roman or a Byzantine castle. It was a low elevation castle, and it was built to control the road running parallel to the Mediterranean Sea coast. It was also used by the Crusades and Armenian Kingdom of Cilicia, during which the castle underwent renovation.

In June 1981 the American archaeologist and art historian Dr. Robert W. Edwards conducted a formal survey of this site and drew the following conclusions. The rectangular circuit wall and the fragments of its seven small towers were so badly decayed that it was impossible without a formal excavation to deduce the date of construction. However, the surviving portion of the three-storey estate house (keep) is primarily from one period of construction with masonry and architectural features identical to those used during the 12th and 13th centuries in the Armenian Kingdom of Cilicia. It is similar to the nearby medieval site of Kız near the Durak railway station. These sites were built by Armenian masons, perhaps for Crusader occupants.

== Architecture ==
The area within the now ruined ramparts is 1,560 m^{2} (16,800 sq ft). Most of the buildings are ruined. The only partially standing building is a three-story donjon. The length of the eastern wall is 9.60 m (31.5 ft) and its height is 12 m (39 ft). The northern wall is 11.5 m (38 ft) long and 13 m (43 ft) high. The width of the outer wall is 1.50 m (4.9 ft). The masonry of the inner walls is of ashlar blocks and the outer walls of bossage blocks. The 1981 survey was conducted under the auspices of the University of California at Berkeley.

== See also ==
- List of Crusader castles
