= Çukurkeşli =

- Neighbourhood
- Location in Turkey
- Coordinates: 36°54′N 34°30′E
- Country: Turkey
- Province: Mersin
- District: Yenişehir
- Elevation: 405 m (1,329 ft)
- Population (2022): 300
- Time zone: UTC+3 (TRT)
- Postal code: 33112
- Area code: 0324

Çukurkeşli is a neighbourhood in the municipality and district of Yenişehir, Mersin Province, Turkey. Its population is 300 (2022). It is a mountain village situated in a canyon about 400 metres (1,300 ft) deep. The distance to Mersin is 18 kilometres (11 mi) and the village is now considered as a suburb of Mersin.
