= Çavak =

- Neighbourhood
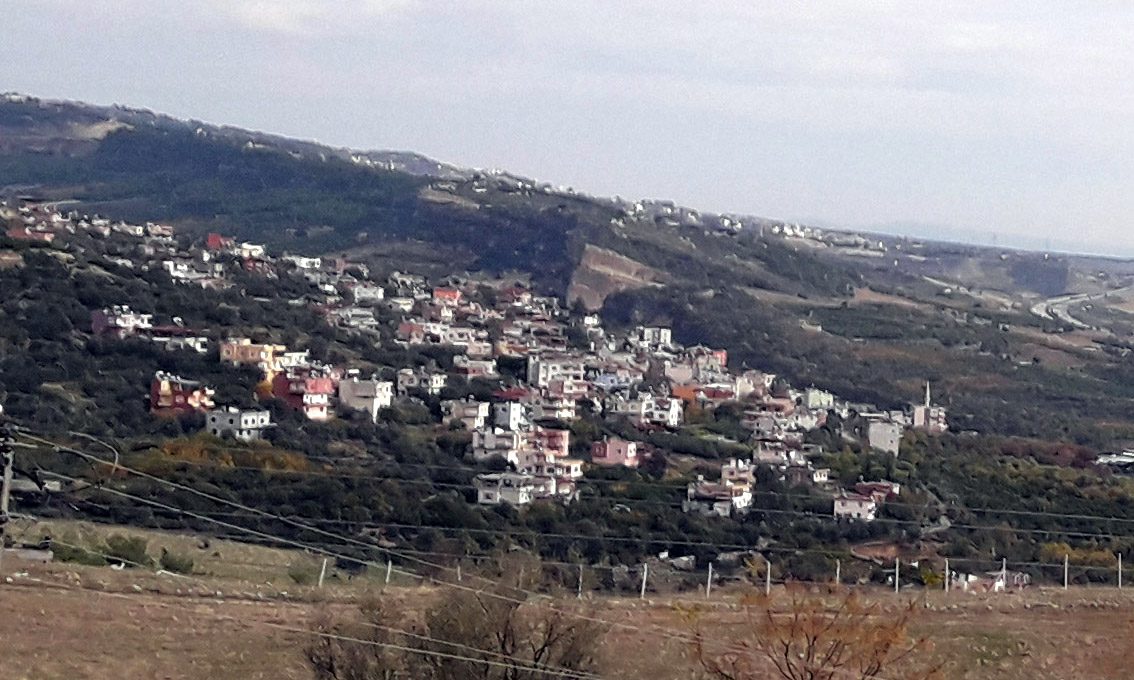
- Çavak from west

- Location within Turkey
- Coordinates: 36°50′N 34°33′E
- Country: Turkey
- Province: Mersin
- District: Yenişehir
- Elevation: 139 m (456 ft)
- Population (2022): 1,121
- Time zone: UTC+3 (TRT)

Çavak is a neighbourhood in the municipality and district of Yenişehir, Mersin Province, Turkey. Its population is 1,121 (2022).
