= Mersin Marina =

Location
- Country: Turkey
- Location: Yenişehir, Mersin
- Coordinates: 36°46′N 34°34′E

Details
- Opened: 1994
- Operated by: ERS İnşaat company
- Type of harbour: yacht marina
- Size of harbour: 160,000 m^{2} (1,700,000 sq ft)
- Land area: 145,000 m^{2} (1,560,000 sq ft)

Statistics
- Website www.mersinmarina.com.tr

Mersin Marina is a marina at the eastern Mediterranean Sea coast situated in Mersin, Turkey

== Geography ==
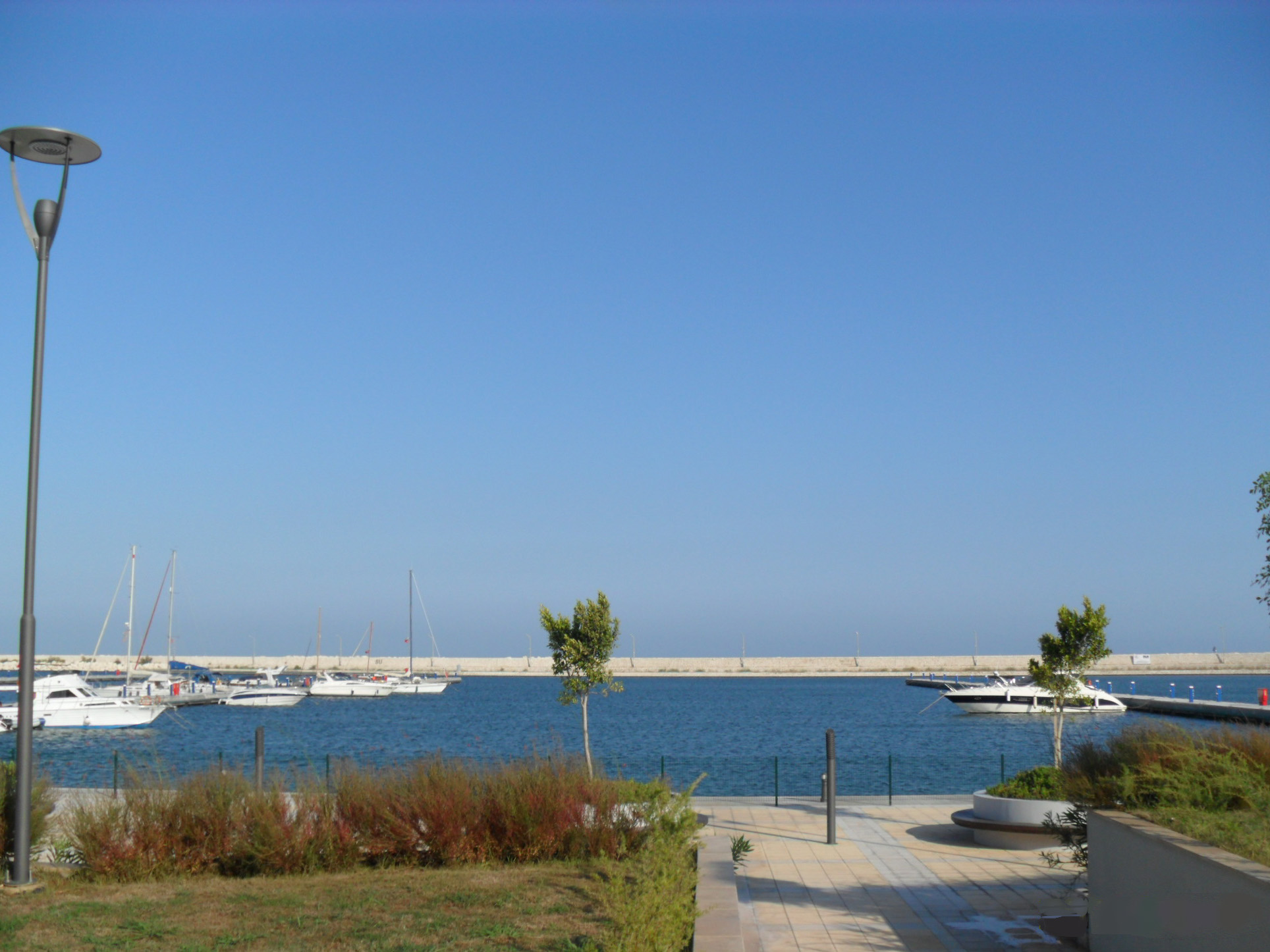
Part of the marina from the mall

The marina is in the Yenişehir district of Mersin, about 6 km (3.7 mi) west of Mersin Harbor.

== History ==
Before the 1970s, Mersin was used to be a stop in scheduled sea voyages of Turkey. But after the maritime operators shortened their cruise destinations, Mersin is no more a stop in scheduled voyages. Instead, it is now planned to be a stop in international yachting tourism. The old marina, which was actually a part of the Mersin Harbour, is found to be insufficient for yacht traffic. While the old marina is now reserved for fishing boats, the new marina was constructed after 1994. In 2006, the operating rights were awarded to ERS İnşaat company within the scope of a build-operate-transfer project.

== Facilities ==
The marina has two breakwaters: the west breakwater is 1,140 m (3,740 ft) and the downwind breakwater is 265 m (869 ft). There are two lighthouses, one at each breakwater. The size of the marina land which is mostly a mall, is 145,000 m^{2} (1,560,000 sq ft) while the enclosed water surface is 160,000 m^{2} (1,700,000 sq ft). The total length of the marina berth is 2,500 m (8,200 ft), which enables the mooring of 500 yachts.
