= Yenişehir, Mersin =

Secondary municipality in Mersin, Turkey

Yenişehir
- District and municipality
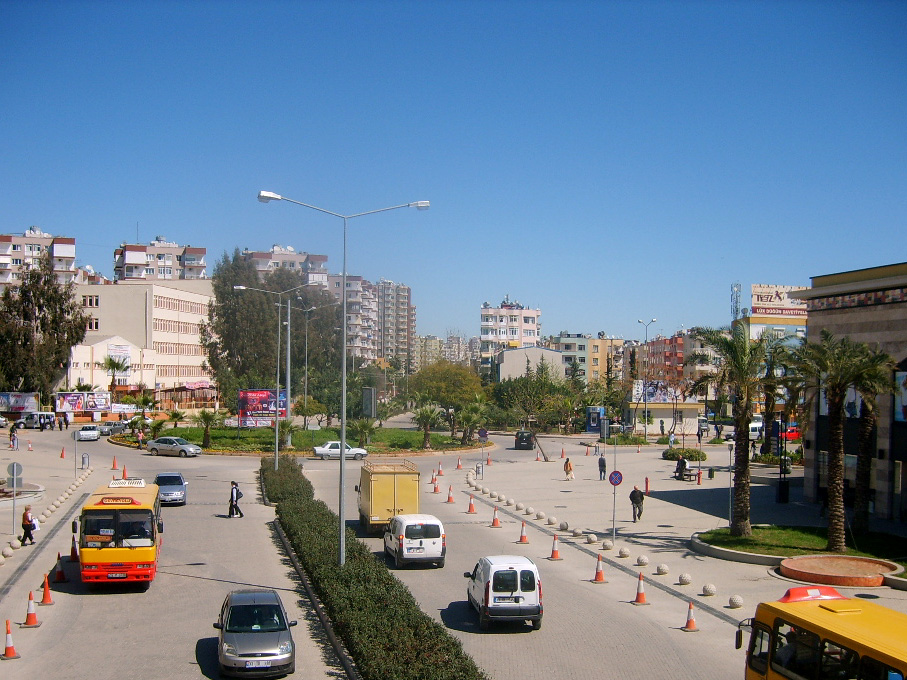

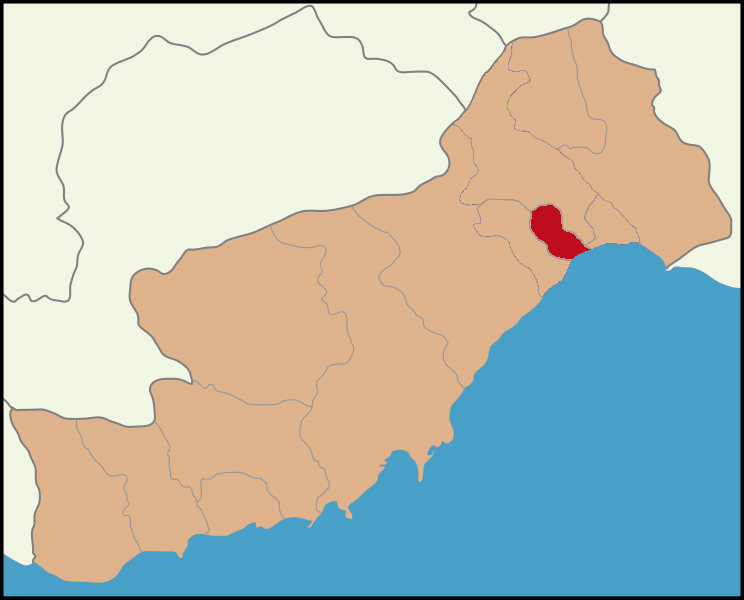
- Map showing Yenişehir District in Mersin Province

- Location within Turkey
- Coordinates: 36°47′N 34°36′E
- Country: Turkey
- Province: Mersin

Government
  - Mayor: Abdullah Özyiğit (CHP)
- Area: 139 km^{2} (54 sq mi)
- Population (2022): 278,961
  - Density: 2,010/km^{2} (5,200/sq mi)
- Time zone: UTC+3 (TRT)
- Area code: 0324
- Website: www.yenisehir.bel.tr

Yenişehir (Turkish pronunciation: ['jeniʃehiɾ]) is a municipality and district of Mersin Province, Turkey. Its area is 139 km^{2}, and its population is 278,961 (2022). It covers the west-central part of the city of Mersin and the adjacent countryside.

== History ==
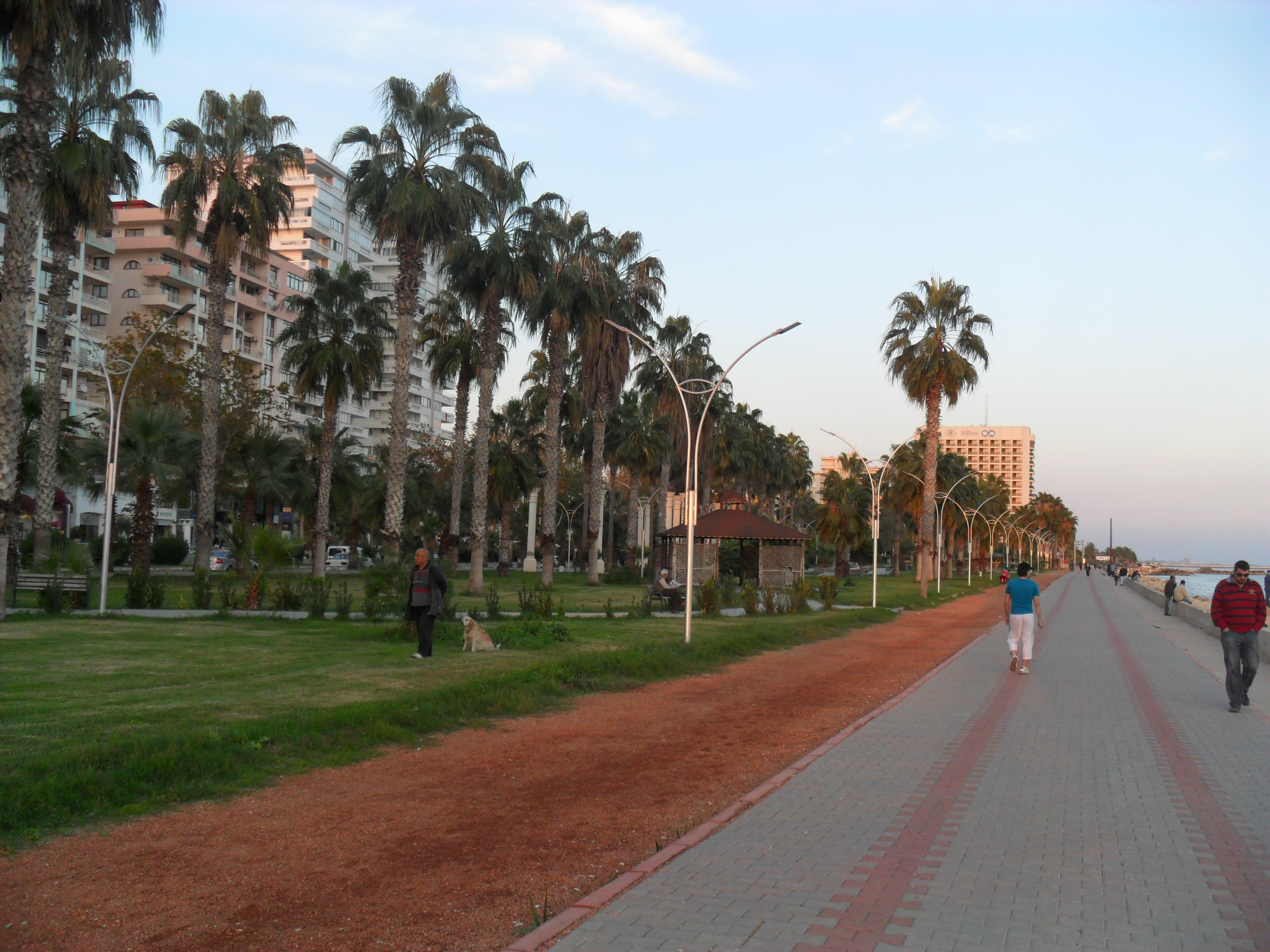
Walking trail by the seaside

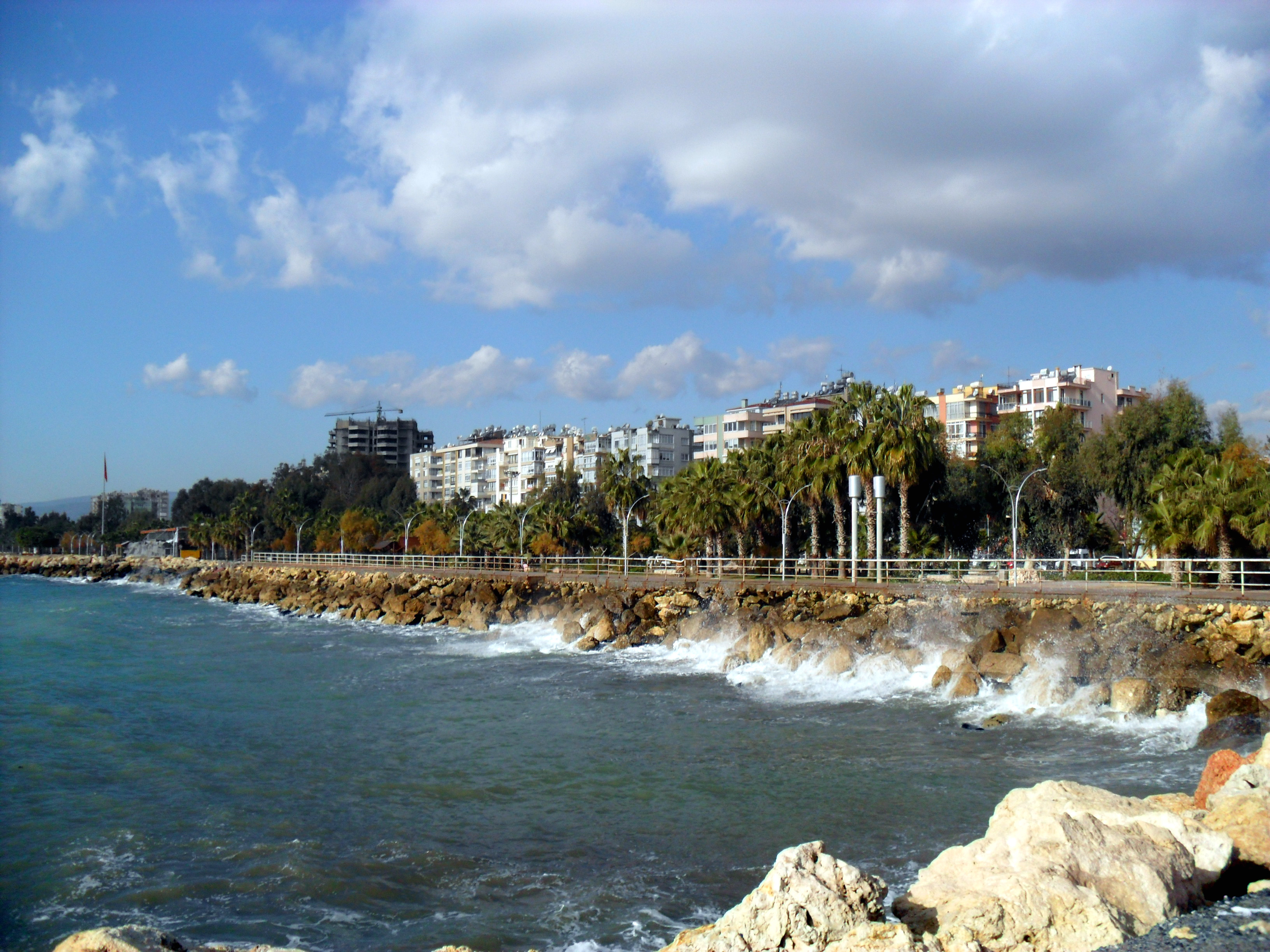
Mediterranean shore

Originally a part of Mersin municipality, the municipality of Yenişehir was established in 1993 as a secondary level municipality of Mersin. In 2008 the district Yenişehir was created from part of the former central district of Mersin, along with the districts Mezitli, Toroslar and Akdeniz. At the same time, the former municipality Çiftlikköy was absorbed into the municipality of Yenişehir. At the 2013 Turkish local government reorganisation, the rural part of the district was integrated into the municipality, the villages becoming neighbourhoods.

== Location ==
Yenişehir is located between Akdeniz (east) and Mezitli (west) districts. In the east Yenişehir is bounded by Efrenk River and in the south by Mediterranean Sea.

== Population ==
According to 2022 figures, the population of Yenişehir was 278,961. Approximately 25% of Mersin citizens live in Yenişehir. The annual population growth is over 3.7% which is higher than Mersin average.

== Living ==
Yenişehir, also regionally known as Pozcu, is the most densely populated intracity district of Mersin and serves as the City's commercial center. Mersin's largest shopping center "Forum" lies at the middle of Yenişehir. Both Mersin University and Toros University are located in Yenişehir. Muğdat Mosque, the largest mosque in Mersin is also in Yenişehir.

== Composition ==
There are 32 neighbourhoods in Yenişehir District:

- 50. Yıl
- Akkent
- Aydınlıkevler
- Bahçelievler
- Barbaros
- Batıkent
- Çavak
- Çiftlikköy
- Çukurkeşli
- Cumhuriyet
- Değirmençay
- Deniz
- Dumlupınar
- Eğriçam
- Emirler
- Fuat Morel
- Gazi
- Gökçebelen
- Güvenevler
- Hürriyet
- İnönü
- İnsu
- Karahacılı
- Kocahamzalı
- Kocavilayet
- Kuzeykent
- Limonluk
- Menteş
- Palmiye
- Pirireis
- Turunçlu
- Uzunkaş

== Sport ==
Most of Mersin sports venues are in Yenişehir. Tevfik Sırrı Gür Stadium as well as Mersin Olympic Stadium are in Yenişehir. Edip Buran Arena, Nevin Yanıt Athletics Complex, Macit Özcan Sports Complex, Mersin Olympic Swimming Pool, Mersin Volleyball Hall, Servet Tazegül Arena, Mersin Tennis Complex and Mersin Gymnastics Hall are also in Yenişehir. All of these facilities were used in 2013 Mediterranean Games.

For the 2013 Mediterranean Games, a 1,288-seat new Mersin Gymnastics Hall was built, and the existing multi-sport venue Edip Buran Arena as well as the Nevin Yanıt Athletics Complex were renovated and modernized. The Edip Buran Arena is home to Turkish Basketball League (TBL) player Mersin Büyükşehir Belediyesi men's and Turkish Women's Basketball League (TKBL) player Mersin Büyükşehir Belediyesi women's basketball teams. Tevfik Sırrı Gür Stadium is the home to Mersin İdmanyurdu. Another new sports venue built for the 2013 Mediterranean Games is the Mersin Volleyball Hall with 1,000 seating capacity, which hosted the men's tournament matches. The Macit Özcan Sports Complex, built in 2008, consists of three football fields, three tennis courts and three swimming pools, one of them in Olympic-size. The water polo events took place at this site on June 19–26.

== Sites of interest ==
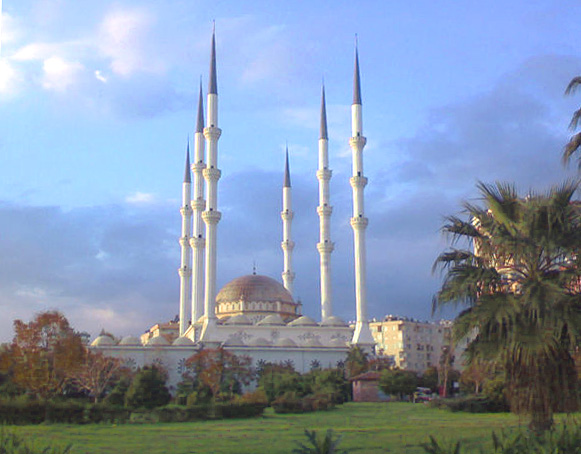
Muğdat Mosque with its six minarets

- Muğdat Mosque, the City's largest Mosque and one of five Mosques in Turkey with six minarets.
- Mersin Archaeological Museum, opened in 2017 exhibits various items from different stages of Mersin History.
- Mersin Naval Museum, opened in 2010
- Emirler Archaeological Site and City Forest Museum, a small Museum about 13 kilometres (8.1 mi) north of the City.
- Mersin Marina

== International relations ==
Yenişehir is twinned with:

- Neustadt an der Weinstraße, Germany
- Iskele, Northern Cyprus
