= Kuzucu, Mezitli =

Kuzucu
- Neighbourhood
- Location in Turkey
- Coordinates: 36°50′N 34°25′E
- Country: Turkey
- Province: Mersin
- District: Mezitli
- Elevation: 660 m (2,170 ft)
- Population (2022): 326
- Time zone: UTC+3 (TRT)
- Area code: 0324

Kuzucu is a neighbourhood in the municipality and district of Mezitli, Mersin Province, Turkey. Its population is 326 (2022). It is situated in the southern slopes of the Toros Mountains. The distance to Mersin is about 25 kilometres (16 mi).
