= Pelitkoyağı =

- Neighbourhood
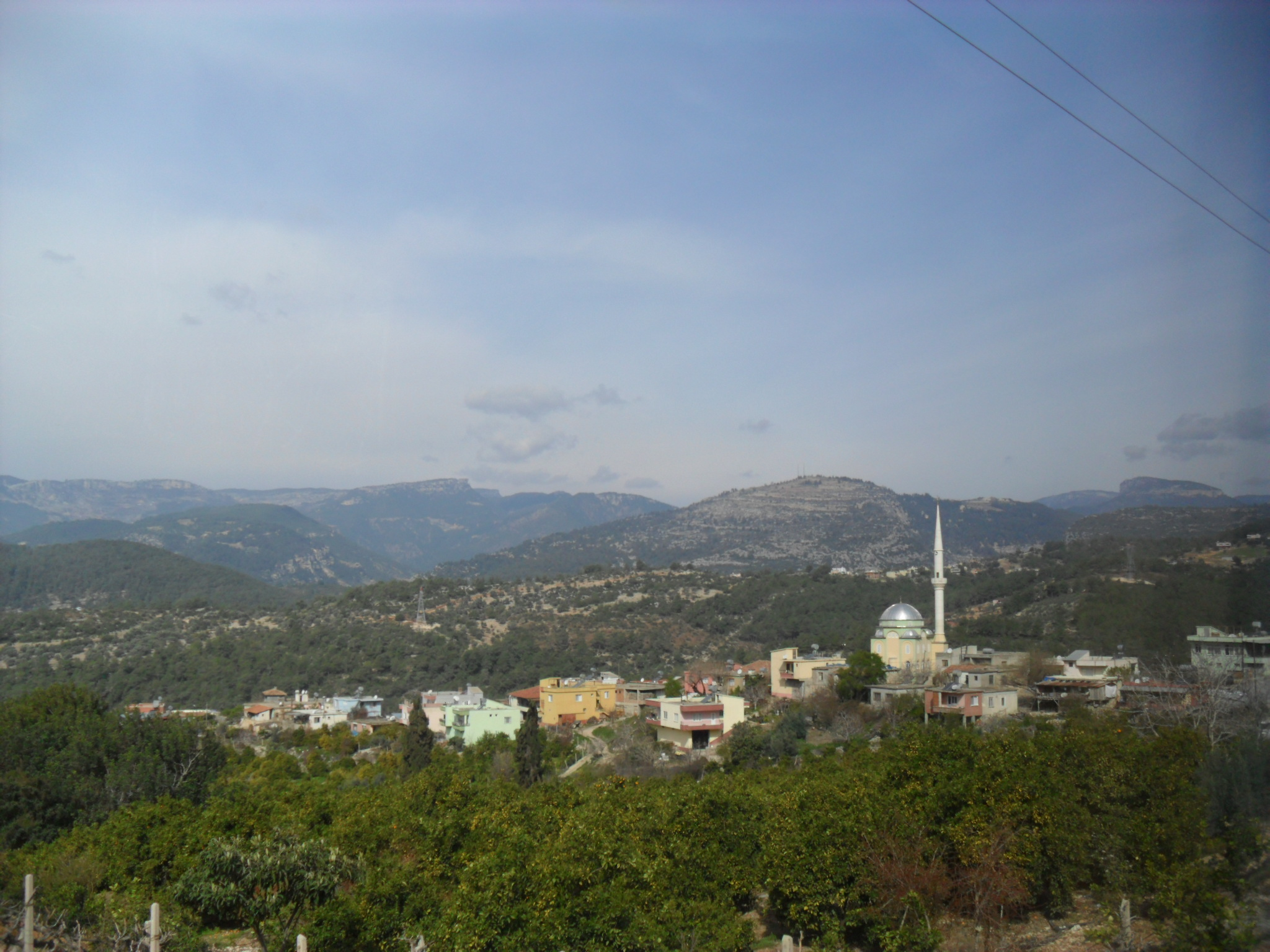

- Location within Turkey
- Coordinates: 36°47′N 34°26′E
- Country: Turkey
- Province: Mersin
- District: Mezitli
- Elevation: 490 m (1,610 ft)
- Population (2022): 117
- Time zone: UTC+3 (TRT)
- Area code: 0324

Pelitkoyağı is a neighbourhood in the municipality and district of Mezitli, Mersin Province, Turkey. Its population is 117 (2022). The distance to Mersin is 18 kilometres (11 mi).
