= Tol, Mersin =

Tol
- Neighbourhood
- Location in Turkey
- Coordinates: 36°49′N 34°23′E
- Country: Turkey
- Province: Mersin
- District: Mezitli
- Elevation: 775 m (2,543 ft)
- Population (2022): 111
- Time zone: UTC+3 (TRT)
- Area code: 0324

Tol (or Tolköy) is a neighbourhood in the municipality and district of Mezitli, Mersin Province, Turkey. Its population is 111 (2022). It is situated between a creek and a high hill in the Taurus Mountains. The distance to Mersin is 28 kilometres (17 mi).
