= Cemilli, Mersin =

Cemilli
- Neighbourhood
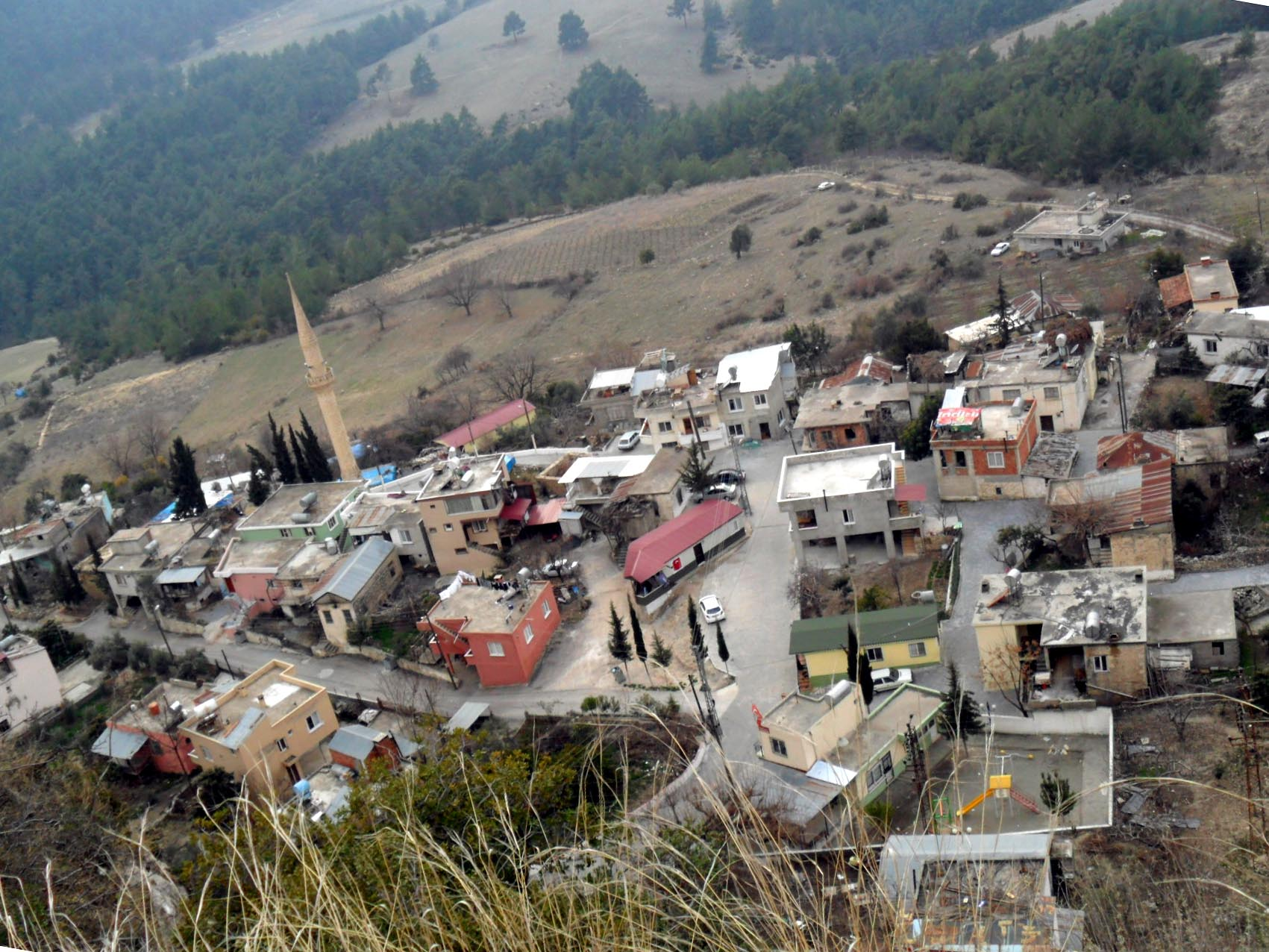

- Location within Turkey
- Coordinates: 36°48′N 34°27′E
- Country: Turkey
- Province: Mersin
- District: Mezitli
- Elevation: 500 m (1,600 ft)
- Population (2022): 242
- Time zone: UTC+3 (TRT)
- Area code: 0324

Cemilli is a neighbourhood in the municipality and district of Mezitli, Mersin Province, Turkey. Its population is 242 (2022). It is situated on the road connecting Mersin to Fındıkpınarı and to the south of the Taurus Mountains. Its distance to Mersin is 22 kilometres (14 mi). As of January 2017, the village did not have a hospital or school.
