= Tece =

- Neighbourhood
- Location in Turkey
- Coordinates: 36°42′09″N 34°26′56″E
- Country: Turkey
- Province: Mersin
- District: Mezitli
- Population (2022): 1,407
- Time zone: UTC+3 (TRT)

Tece (Turkish pronunciation: [ˈtɛdʒɛ]) is a neighbourhood in the municipality and district of Mezitli, Mersin Province, Turkey. Its population is 1,407 (2022).

Tece is named after Tece Creek which is to the east of the neighbourhood. It is located on Turkish state highway D.400, 16 kilometres (9.9 mi) from the center of Mersin.

Tece used to be a small village located in the citrus plantation, but due to its proximity to Mersin and housing projects in the 1990s, its population increased sharply and a municipality was established in Tece. However, in 2008, the municipality was disestablished and Tece was made a neighbourhood of Mezitli.

Tece is known for its ancient castle and its creek. The Mersin municipality now runs a project of coastal area. The project will include walking trails, bicycle roads, playgrounds, fitness centres, sport courts and coffeehouses between Mersin and Tece.
