= Kocahamzalı =

- Neighbourhood
- Location in Turkey
- Coordinates: 36°52′N 34°31′E
- Country: Turkey
- Province: Mersin
- District: Yenişehir
- Elevation: 700 m (2,300 ft)
- Population (2022): 256
- Time zone: UTC+3 (TRT)
- Postal code: 33112
- Area code: 0324

Kocahamzalı is a neighbourhood in the municipality and district of Yenişehir, Mersin Province, Turkey. Its population is 256 (2022). The village is 18 kilometres (11 mi) north of Mersin city center. It overlooks Mersin and local TV and radio stations have installed transmitter stations in the village.
