= Akarca, Mersin =

Akarca
- Neighbourhood
- Location in Turkey
- Coordinates: 36°52′N 34°25′E
- Country: Turkey
- Province: Mersin
- District: Mezitli
- Elevation: 805 m (2,641 ft)
- Population (2022): 581
- Time zone: UTC+3 (TRT)
- Area code: 0324

Akarca is a neighbourhood in the municipality and district of Mezitli, Mersin Province, Turkey. Its population is 581 (2022). It is situated in the Taurus Mountains. Its distance to Mersin is 36 kilometres (22 mi). In the vicinity of the village is a chromium mining site.
