= Değirmençay =

Değirmençay Erçel
- Neighbourhood
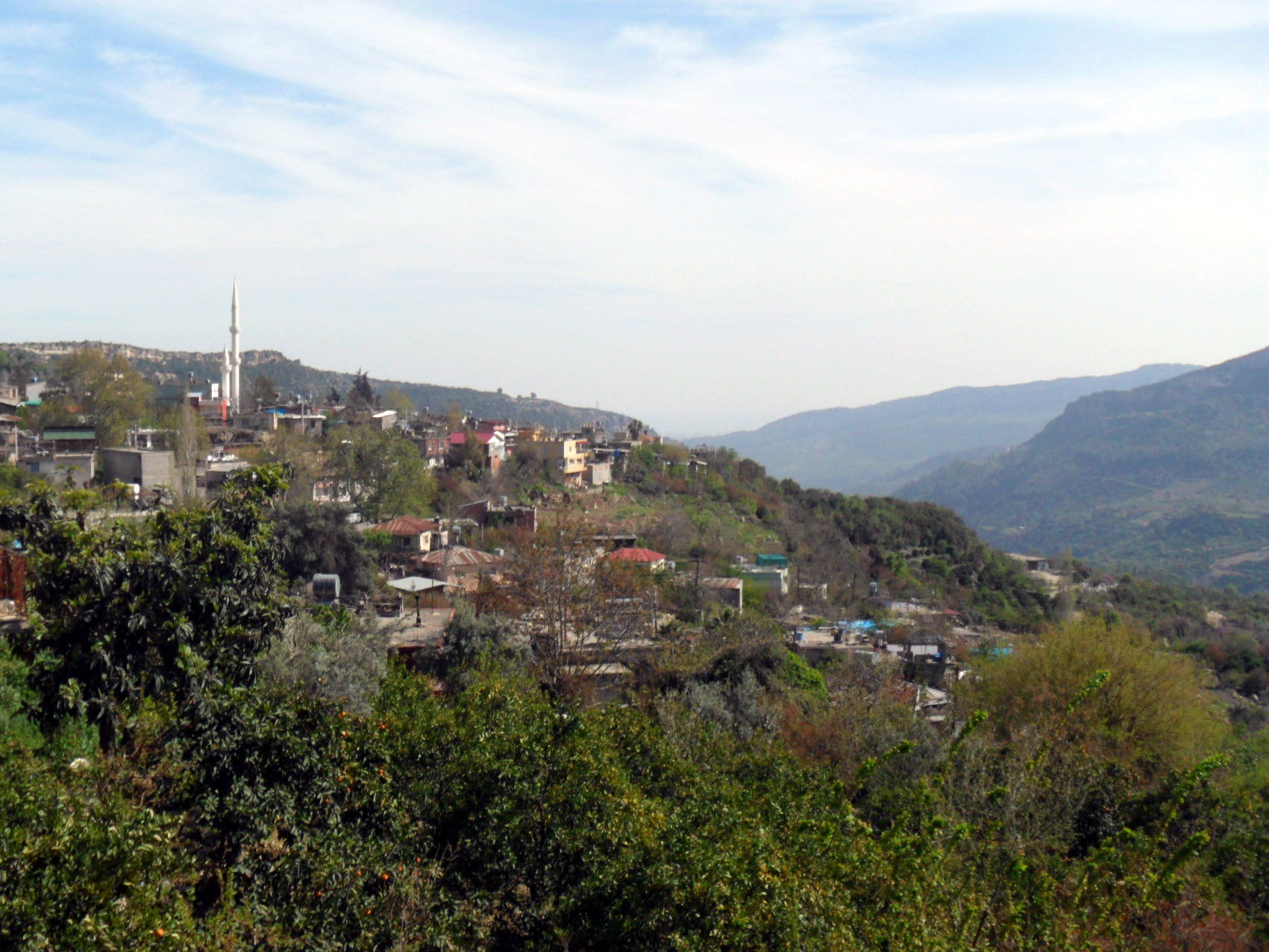

- Location within Turkey
- Coordinates: 36°53′N 34°28′E
- Country: Turkey
- Province: Mersin
- District: Yenişehir
- Elevation: 600 m (2,000 ft)
- Population (2022): 868
- Time zone: UTC+3 (TRT)
- Area code: 0324

Değirmençay (formerly Erçel) is a neighbourhood in the municipality and district of Yenişehir, Mersin Province, Turkey. Its population is 868 (2022). Before the 2013 reorganisation, it was a town (belde).

== Geography ==
The town is in the rural area of Yenişehir district which itself is an intracity district of Mersin. It is situated in the Toros Mountains with an average elevation of 600 m (1830 ft). It is relatively close to plains and the Mediterranean Sea coast. The bird's flight distance to Mediterranean Sea coast is 17 kilometres (11 mi) and the road distance to Mersin is 25 kilometres (16 mi).

== History ==
The village called Erçel may be as old as 300 years. But there are traces of human habitation even before the village was founded. In particular there are ruins of two castles named Manavşa (to the north) and Başnalar (to the south east) Erçel was an important center of Turkish resistance during the Franco-Turkish War just after the First World War. In 1961 the village was named as Değirmençay. In 1992 the village was declared a township.

== Economy ==
Although a mountain town the agricultural products are not different from those produced in the coastal area. Fruits including all kinds of citrus, pomegranate apricot along with vegetables are produced around Değirmençay. On more barren fields cereal is also produced. Another promising activity is apiculture.
