= Çevlik, Mezitli =

Çevlik
- Neighbourhood
- Location in Turkey
- Coordinates: 36°46′44″N 34°27′25″E
- Country: Turkey
- Province: Mersin
- District: Mezitli
- Elevation: 295 m (968 ft)
- Population (2022): 422
- Time zone: UTC+3 (TRT)
- Area code: 0324

Çevlik is a neighbourhood in the municipality and district of Mezitli, Mersin Province, Turkey. Its population is 422 (2022). The distance to Mersin is about 15 kilometres (9.3 mi).
