= Takanlı =

- Neighbourhood
- Location in Turkey
- Coordinates: 36°48′N 34°26′E
- Country: Turkey
- Province: Mersin
- District: Mezitli
- Elevation: 460 m (1,510 ft)
- Population (2022): 372
- Time zone: UTC+3 (TRT)
- Area code: 0324

Takanlı is a neighbourhood in the municipality and district of Mezitli, Mersin Province, Turkey. Its population is 372 (2022). It is situated in the peneplain at the South of the Taurus Mountains 23 kilometres (14 mi) away from Mersin.
