= Sarılar, Mersin =

Sarılar
- Neighbourhood
- Location in Turkey
- Coordinates: 36°54′N 34°18′E
- Country: Turkey
- Province: Mersin
- District: Mezitli
- Elevation: 1,160 m (3,810 ft)
- Population (2022): 421
- Time zone: UTC+3 (TRT)
- Area code: 0324

Sarılar is a neighbourhood in the municipality and district of Mezitli, Mersin Province, Turkey. Its population was 421 as of 2022. It is situated in the southern slopes of Toros Mountains, 65 kilometres (40 mi) away from Mersin.
