= Emirler, Mersin =

Emirler
- Neighbourhood
- Location in Turkey
- Coordinates: 36°50′N 34°31′E
- Country: Turkey
- Province: Mersin
- District: Yenişehir
- Elevation: 360 m (1,180 ft)
- Population (2022): 683
- Time zone: UTC+3 (TRT)
- Postal code: 33112
- Area code: 0324

Emirler is a neighbourhood in the municipality and district of Yenişehir, Mersin Province, Turkey. Its population is 683 (2022). The village is 15 kilometres (9.3 mi) north of Mersin city center. There are other villages named Emirler in both Tarsus and in Niğde and according to tradition these villages were founded by three brothers.
