= Doğlu =

- Neighbourhood
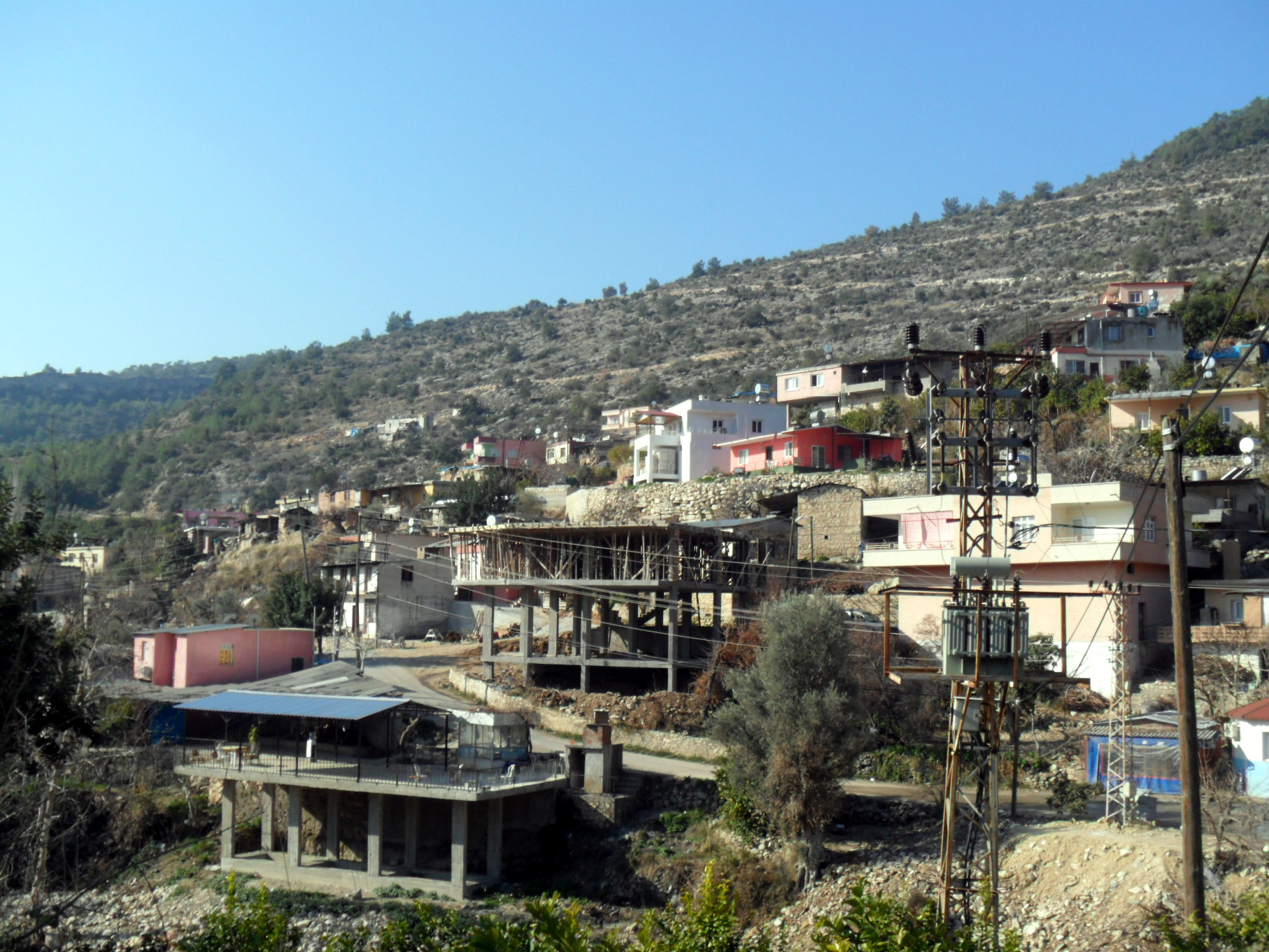

- Location within Turkey
- Coordinates: 36°45′N 34°25′E
- Country: Turkey
- Province: Mersin
- District: Mezitli
- Elevation: 150 m (490 ft)
- Population (2022): 564
- Time zone: UTC+3 (TRT)
- Postal code: 33170
- Area code: 0324

Doğlu is a neighbourhood in the municipality and district of Mezitli, Mersin Province, Turkey. Its population is 564 as of 2022. Situated in the peneplane area at the south of Toros Mountains, its distance to Mersin is about 30 km (19 mi).
