= İnsu =

- Neighbourhood
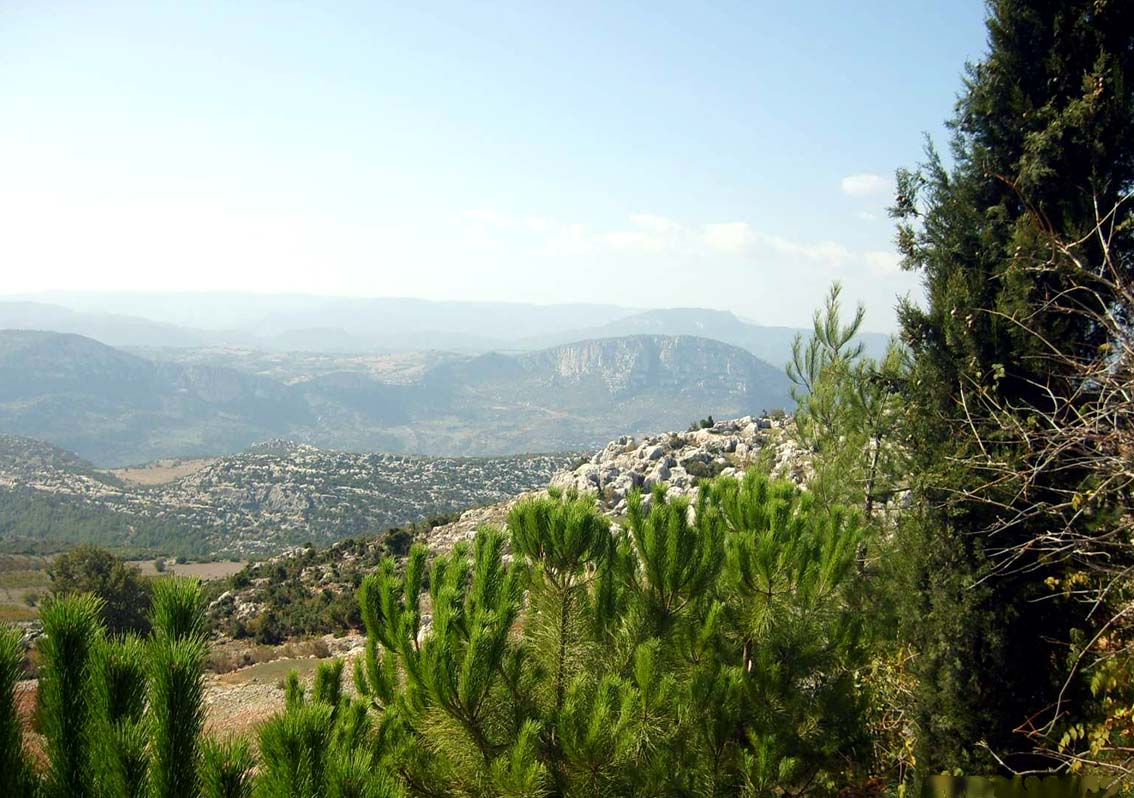

- Location within Turkey
- Coordinates: 36°52′N 34°30′E
- Country: Turkey
- Province: Mersin
- District: Yenişehir
- Elevation: 835 m (2,740 ft)
- Population (2022): 236
- Time zone: UTC+3 (TRT)
- Postal code: 33112
- Area code: 0324

İnsu is a neighbourhood in the municipality and district of Yenişehir, Mersin Province, Turkey. Its population is 236 (2022). The village is 20 kilometres (12 mi) north of Mersin city center and south of a canyon about 400 metres (1,300 ft) deep. After 2019, the southern part of the village became popular as a summer resort. Now İnsu is popular with 'country houses'. It is a leisure destination for families. Some of the new houses are modern style including pools, too. Lately İnsu became a place like 'a neighborhood that is out of city'.
