= Özdemir İnce =

Turkish poet, essayist and translator

- Born: 1 September 1936 (age 90); Fındıkpınarı, Mersin Province, Turkey
- Education: Gazi Institute of Education
- Occupations: Poet, essayist, literary critic, translator, journalist
- Writing career
- Language: Turkish
- Genres: Poetry, essay, literary criticism
- Notable awards: Prix Max Jacob étranger (2006); PEN Turkey Poetry Award (2010)

Özdemir İnce (born 1 September 1936) is a Turkish poet, essayist, literary critic, translator and journalist. He began publishing poetry in the mid-1950s and released his first collection, Kargı, in 1963. His early collections displayed features associated with the Second New movement, while his later poetry combined formal experimentation and dense imagery with socially engaged themes.

İnce has also translated poetry, fiction, drama and works of political thought into Turkish. Writers he has translated include Yannis Ritsos, Lautréamont, Arthur Rimbaud, René Char, Karl Marx and Milan Kundera. The French edition of his poetry collection Mani est vivant! received the Prix Max Jacob étranger in 2006. He received the PEN Turkey Poetry Award in 2010.

== Early life and education ==
İnce was born on 1 September 1936 in the Fındıkpınarı highlands of Mersin Province. He attended Kayatepe Primary School and Mersin High School. During his secondary-school years, his literature teacher, folklorist Cahit Öztelli, introduced him to the literary magazine Varlık and encouraged his interest in writing.

He initially enrolled in the Faculty of Law at Ankara University, but later transferred to the French department of the Gazi Institute of Education, from which he graduated in 1960. He subsequently worked as a French teacher in Sandıklı, Çine, Aydın and Muğla.

After receiving a scholarship from the French government, İnce studied contemporary French language and literature and phonetics at the Sorbonne during the 1965–1966 academic year.

== Professional career ==
In 1969, İnce joined the Turkish Radio and Television Corporation (TRT), initially working as a translator in its foreign news department. During his career at the corporation, he also worked as a scriptwriter and held editorial, programme-planning and administrative positions. He retired from TRT in 1982.

He later worked as an editor for Can Publishing and as an editor and publishing director for Telos Publishing. In 1995, he wrote a column entitled “Tersi ve Yüzü” for the newspaper Yeni Yüzyıl. He used the same title for his column in Hürriyet, where he wrote from January 2000 until April 2012.

== Literary work ==
İnce's first poem appeared in the Adana-based magazine Yağmur. Beginning in 1954, his poems were also published in periodicals including Kaynak, Salkım, Yeni Ufuklar and Yücel. His first collection, Kargı, was followed by books including Tutanaklar and Kiraz Zamanı.

Literary scholar Soner Akpınar describes İnce's early poetry as sharing the image-centred language, linguistic deviation and semantic ambiguity associated with the Second New. İnce, however, did not retain the movement's tendency to subordinate explicit meaning. In later collections such as Siyasetnâme and Zorba ve Ozan, he increasingly developed a socially engaged poetic voice. Akpınar characterises his mature work as a meeting point between the aesthetics of the Second New and socially conscious poetry, while remaining distinct from the slogan-oriented conventions of some socialist-realist writing.

İnce has primarily written in free verse, although he has also used syllabic metre and Western verse forms. His poetry draws on subjects including love, nature, resistance, politics, history and the sciences, and employs colloquial speech, idioms, repetition and linguistic experimentation.

Alongside poetry, İnce has written extensively on literary theory, criticism, culture and politics. Essays first published in journals such as Varlık, Adam Sanat and Hürriyet Gösteri were later collected in book form.

== Translation work ==
İnce has translated works from several literary genres, including poetry, novels, plays, essays and political writing. His translations include works by Ritsos, Lautréamont, Rimbaud, Char, Marx and Kundera. His Turkish translation of Ritsos's Taşlar, Yinelemeler, Parmaklıklar received the Turkish Language Association Translation Award in 1978.

He has described translation as a multidimensional form of cultural transfer between a source text and a target text. He also co-edited poetry anthologies, including Çağdaş Bulgar Şiiri Antolojisi and the multivolume Dünya Şiiri Antolojisi, with Ataol Behramoğlu.

== Selected works ==
=== Poetry ===
- Kargı (1963)
- Tutanaklar (1967)
- Kiraz Zamanı (1969)
- Karşı Yazgı (1974)
- Rüzgâra Yazılıdır (1979)
- Kentler (1981)
- Yedi Deryalar Geçsen (1983)
- Siyasetnâme (1984)
- Zorba ve Ozan (1987)
- Uykusuzluk (1996)
- Evren Ağacı (2000)
- Ot Hızı (2002)
- Keskindoreke Fındınfalava (2006)
- Magma ve Kör Saat (2007)
- Ağustos 1936, Annemin Karnında Son Bir Ay (2008)
- René Char'ın Bostanı'nda Sabah Gezintileri (2012)
- Opera Kahkahası (2017)

=== Essays and literary criticism ===
- Şiir ve Gerçeklik (1985)
- Söz ve Yazı (1991)
- Tabula Rasa (1992)
- Yazınsal Söylem Üzerine (1993)
- Tarih Bağışlamaz (1994)
- Mevsimsiz Yazılar (2002)
- Gördüğünü Kitaba Yaz (2002)
- Cehaletin Rönesansı (2013)
- Edebiyat Sadece Edebiyat Değildir (2015)
- Edebiyat ve Siyaset Olarak Hayat (2016)

=== Selected translations ===
- Karl Marx, Fransa'da Sınıf Mücadeleleri (1967)
- Yannis Ritsos, Taşlar, Yinelemeler, Parmaklıklar (1978)
- Lautréamont, Maldoror'un Şarkıları (1989)
- Arthur Rimbaud, Cehennemde Bir Mevsim – Illuminations (1991)
- Milan Kundera, Saptırılmış Vasiyetler (1993)
- Milan Kundera, Yavaşlık (1995)

== Awards and honours ==
Selected awards received by İnce include:

- May Literature Award (1968)
- Turkish Language Association Translation Award for Taşlar, Yinelemeler, Parmaklıklar (1978)
- Dünya Kitap Book of the Year Award for Uykusuzluk (1996)
- Abdi İpekçi Friendship Special Award (1999)
- Prix Max Jacob étranger for Mani est vivant! (2006)
- Melih Cevdet Anday Poetry Award (2007)
- PEN Turkey Poetry Award (2010)
- Penyo Penev International Poetry Award (2010)
- Translation Association Honorary Award, jointly with Ülker İnce (2010)
