= Uzunkaş =

- Neighbourhood
- Location in Turkey
- Coordinates: 36°52′N 34°27′E
- Country: Turkey
- Province: Mersin
- District: Yenişehir
- Elevation: 545 m (1,788 ft)
- Population (2022): 295
- Time zone: UTC+3 (TRT)
- Postal code: 33112
- Area code: 0324

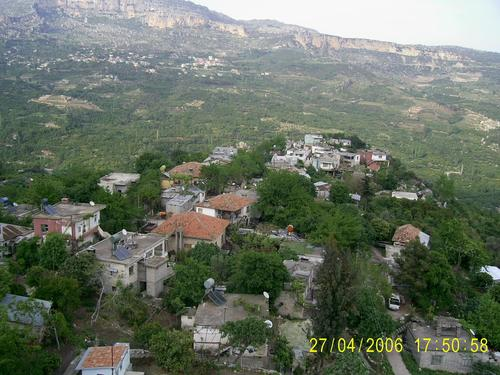
Uzunkaş, Yenişehir

Uzunkaş (former Apsun) is a neighbourhood in the municipality and district of Yenişehir, Mersin Province, Turkey. Its population is 295 (2022). The village is 22 kilometres (14 mi) north west of Mersin city center. The village is situated in Toros Mountains. The main agricultural products are citrus and other fruits.
