= Kocayer =

- Neighbourhood
- Location in Turkey
- Coordinates: 36°53′N 34°19′E
- Country: Turkey
- Province: Mersin
- District: Mezitli
- Elevation: 925 m (3,035 ft)
- Population (2022): 614
- Time zone: UTC+3 (TRT)
- Area code: 0324

Kocayer is a neighbourhood in the municipality and district of Mezitli, Mersin Province, Turkey. Its population is 614 (2022). It is situated in the Toros Mountains. 52 kilometres (32 mi) away from Mersin.
