= In-soo (Korean name) =

- Hangul: 인수
- RR: Insu
- MR: Insu

In-soo, also spelled In-su, is a Korean given name.

People with this name include:

- Seon of Balhae (born Dae Insu, fl. 818–830), 10th king of Balhae
- Queen Insu (1437–1504), wife of Crown Prince Uigyeong of Joseon
- Insoo Kim Berg (1934–2007), Korean-born American psychotherapist
- Moon In-soo (1945–2021), South Korean poet
- Chun In-soo (born 1965), South Korean archer
- Insoo Hyun, American bioethics professor
- Lee In-su (born 1973), South Korean rower
- Kang In-soo (born 1988), South Korean singer, member of boy band Myname
- Yu In-soo (born 1994), South Korean football player
- Yoo In-soo (born 1998), South Korean actor

== See also ==
- List of Korean given names
