= Doğançay, Mersin =

Doğançay Ohun
- Neighbourhood
- Location within Turkey
- Coordinates: 36°51′N 34°26′E
- Country: Turkey
- Province: Mersin
- District: Mezitli
- Elevation: 710 m (2,330 ft)
- Population (2022): 148
- Time zone: UTC+3 (TRT)
- Area code: 0324

Doğançay is a neighbourhood in the municipality and district of Mezitli, Mersin Province, Turkey. Its population is 148 (2022). It is situated in the Taurus Mountains. Its distance to Mersin is 38 kilometres (24 mi).
