= Bozön =

Bozön Kapıköy
- Neighbourhood
- Location in Turkey
- Coordinates: 36°48′N 34°30′E
- Country: Turkey
- Province: Mersin
- District: Mezitli
- Population (2022): 1,141
- Time zone: UTC+3 (TRT)
- Area code: 0324

Bozön is a neighbourhood in the municipality and district of Mezitli, Mersin Province, Turkey. Its population is 1,141 (2022). It is about 10 kilometres (6 mi) west from Mersin city center.
