= Emirler, Tarsus =

Emirler
- Neighbourhood
- Location in Turkey
- Coordinates: 37°13′N 34°57′E
- Country: Turkey
- Province: Mersin
- District: Tarsus
- Elevation: 875 m (2,871 ft)
- Population (2022): 146
- Time zone: UTC+3 (TRT)
- Area code: 0324

Emirler is a neighbourhood in the municipality and district of Tarsus, Mersin Province, Turkey. Its population is 146 (2022). It is situated in the Toros Mountains. It is about 55 kilometres (34 mi) to Tarsus and 85 kilometres (53 mi) to Mersin. According to oral tradition, the village was founded by a tribe from Turkestan. The tribe was split into three and while two other parts founded the villages with the same name near Mersin and near Ulukışla (Niğde Province) the third part founded Emirler in Tarsus district.
