= Mezitli =

Secondary municipality in Mersin, Turkey

- District and municipality
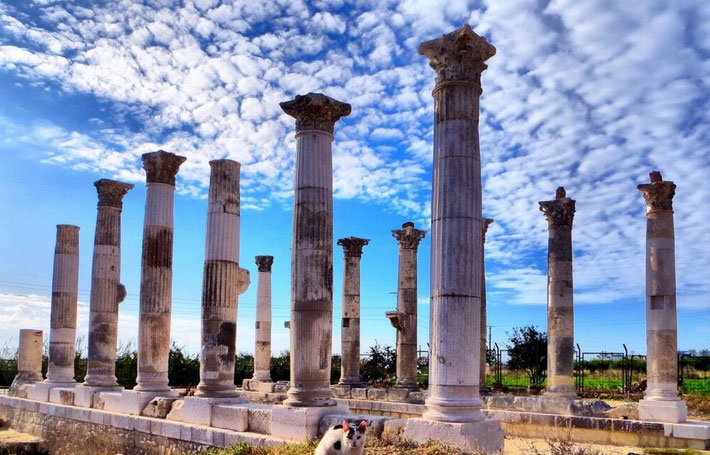
- Colonnades of ancient Soli Pompeipolis

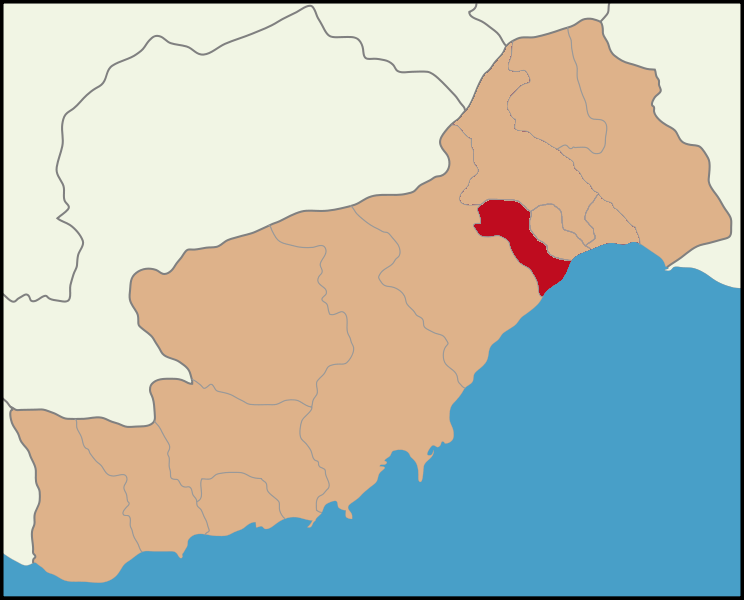
- Map showing Mezitli District in Mersin Province

- Location within Turkey
- Coordinates: 36°45′N 34°32′E
- Country: Turkey
- Province: Mersin

Government
  - Mayor: Ahmet Serkan Tuncer (CHP)
- Area: 371 km^{2} (143 sq mi)
- Population (2024): 225,824
  - Density: 609/km^{2} (1,580/sq mi)
- Time zone: UTC+3 (TRT)
- Area code: 0324
- Website: www.mezitli.bel.tr

Mezitli is a municipality and district of Mersin Province, Turkey. Its area is 371 km^{2}, and its population is 225,824 (2024). It covers the westernmost part of the city of Mersin and the adjacent countryside. The Mayor of Mezitli is Ahmet Serkan Tuncer.

== Geography ==
Mezitli covers the western part of Mersin proper. Southern quarters of Mezitli are popularly known as Viranşehir ("ruined city") because of the ruins. (see below) Yenişehir, another municipality of Mersin, is to the east of Mezitli, Mediterranean Sea is in the south and Toros Mountains in the north. In the west of Mezitli there are summer houses and coastal villages most of which are specialized in citrus industry. Mezitli River (Liparis of the antiquity) flows within Mezitli.

== History ==
The ruins of the ancient Greek city of Soli, which was renamed by Roman general Pompey as Pompeipolis (Πομπηιόπολη) is within Mezitli. Soli was the dominion of Rhodes, Persian Empire, Macedonian Empire, Seleucid Empire, Roman Empire and its successor Byzantine Empire. But after the great earthquake in 528, the city lost its former glory. In later years, the ruins of the city was a part of Umayyad Caliphate, Seljuk Sultanate of Rum, Crusades, Armenian Kingdom of Cilicia, Ramadanids, Mamluk Sultanate, and Ottoman Empire. In the early 20th century, there was only a small village just north of Soli, named after "Mezitoğlu", an Oghuz tribe.

The town municipality was established in 1968. In 2008 the district Mezitli was created from part of the former central district of Mersin, along with the districts Akdeniz, Toroslar and Yenişehir. At the same time, the former municipalities Davultepe, Tece and Kuyuluk were absorbed into the municipality of Mezitli. At the 2013 Turkish local government reorganisation, the rural part of the district was integrated into the municipality, the villages becoming neighbourhoods.

== Living ==
Mezitli is known as a district of middle class residences. Most of Mezitli citizens are either retired or active working people. (Most of business offices are in the other municipalities of Mersin.)

== Composition ==
There are 40 neighbourhoods in Mezitli District:

- 75. Yıl
- Akarca
- Akdeniz
- Anayurt
- Atatürk
- Bozön
- Çamlıca
- Çankaya
- Cemilli
- Çevlik
- Cumhuriyet
- Davultepe
- Demirışık
- Deniz
- Doğançay
- Doğlu
- Esenbağlar
- Eski Mezitli
- Fatih
- Fındıkpınarı
- Hürriyet
- İstiklal
- Kaleköy
- Kocayer
- Kuyuluk
- Kuzucu
- Kuzucubelen
- Menderes
- Merkez
- Pelitkoyağı
- Şahintepesi
- Sarılar
- Seymenli
- Takanlı
- Tece
- Tepeköy
- Tol
- Viranşehir
- Yenimahalle
- Zeybekler

== International relations ==
Mezitli is twinned with:

- Tempelhof-Schöneberg borough of Berlin, Germany
- Çatalköy, Northern Cyprus
