= Turunçlu, Mersin =

Turunçlu
- Neighbourhood
- Location in Turkey
- Coordinates: 36°50′N 34°28′E
- Country: Turkey
- Province: Mersin
- District: Yenişehir
- Elevation: 270 m (890 ft)
- Population (2022): 220
- Time zone: UTC+3 (TRT)
- Postal code: 33112
- Area code: 0324

Turunçlu is a neighbourhood in the municipality and district of Yenişehir, Mersin Province, Turkey. Its population is 220 (2022). The village is 15 kilometres (9.3 mi) north west of Mersin city center.
