= Fındıkpınarı =

Settlement in Turkey

- Neighbourhood
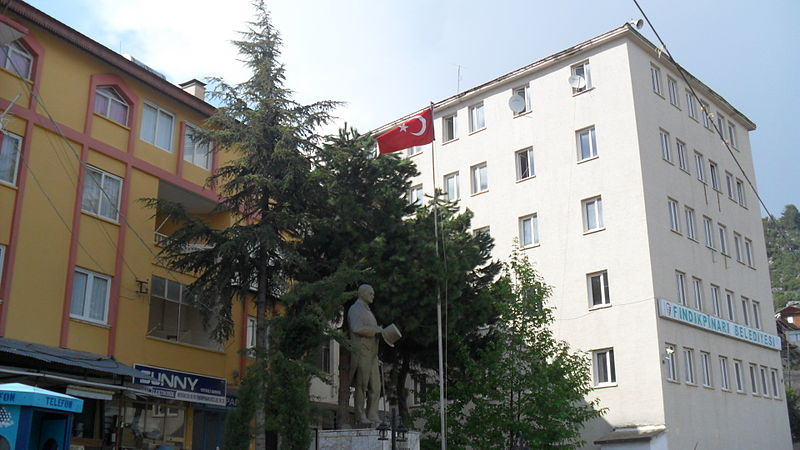
- Town hall

- Location within Turkey
- Coordinates: 36°55′22″N 34°22′5″E
- Country: Turkey
- Province: Mersin
- District: Mezitli
- Elevation: 1,200 m (3,900 ft)
- Population (2022): 991
- Time zone: UTC+3 (TRT)
- Postal code: 33170
- Area code: 0324

Fındıkpınarı is a neighbourhood in the municipality and district of Mezitli, Mersin Province, Turkey. According to 2022 census its population is 991 people. Before the 2013 reorganisation, it was a town (belde).

Fındıkpınarı is a mountain town with an altitude of 1,200 metres (3,900 ft). It is 46 kilometres (29 mi) from Mersin. Situated among pine forests it is a popular summer resort. (Mountain resort towns are usually called yayla) Traditionally, people from Mersin used to spend their summer vacations in Fındıkpınarı.

Above and east of the town is a small garrison fortress consisting of three towers and a single wall which block access to the summit of an outcrop. The masonry and plan of this site date from the 12th or 13th century during the period of the Armenian Kingdom of Cilicia. The fortification was surveyed in 1981. Directly below the outcrop are the traces of a medieval settlement.

On 15 December 1954, Fındıkpınar was declared village and in 1993 the village was declared township .
