= Birkapılı HES =

- Location within Turkey
- Country: Turkey
- Location: Mut, Mersin Province
- Coordinates: 36°43′13″N 33°26′36″E
- Opening date: 11 March 2004

Dam and spillways
- Type of dam: Concrete gravity dam.
- Impounds: Tributary of Göksu River

Power Station
- Installed capacity: 46.5 MWe
- Annual generation: 95 GWh

Birkapılı HES is a privatelly-owned hydroelectric plant in Turkey.

It is at 36°43′13″N 33°26′36″E in Mut ilçe (district) of Mersin Province. It is to the east of Turkish state highway D.715 which connects Mersin to Karaman.

The dam is on Söğütözü (also called Pirinç Suyu) creek, a tributary of Göksu River. It was taken into operation on 11 March 2004. Its operator is Melike Tekstil.

== Technical details ==
The nominal power of the turbines will be 48.5 MWe. With this power the annual energy production is calculated to be 94 GW-hr.
