= Mut Castle =

Castle in Mut, Mersin Province, Turkey

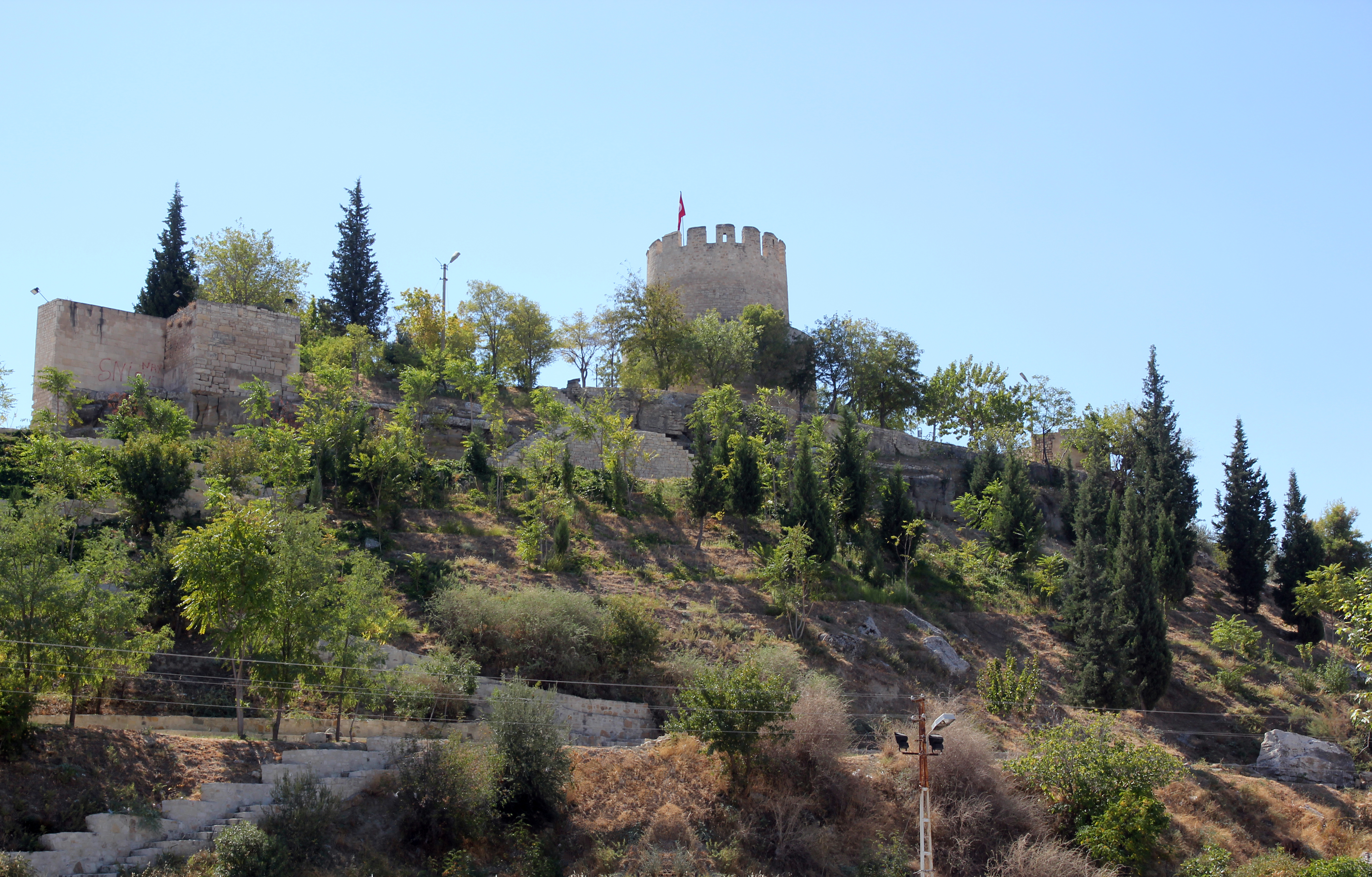
Mut Castle

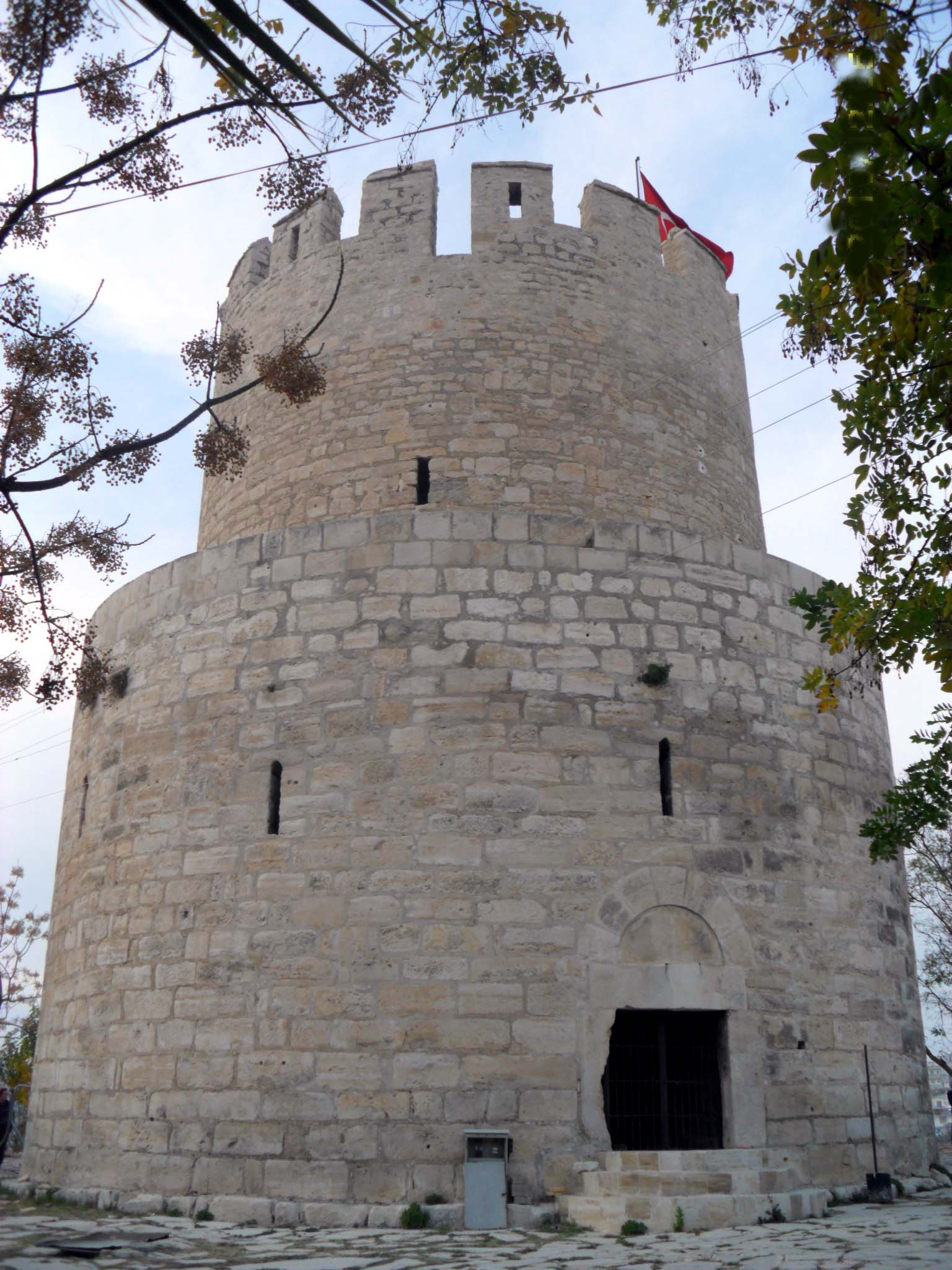
Inner castle

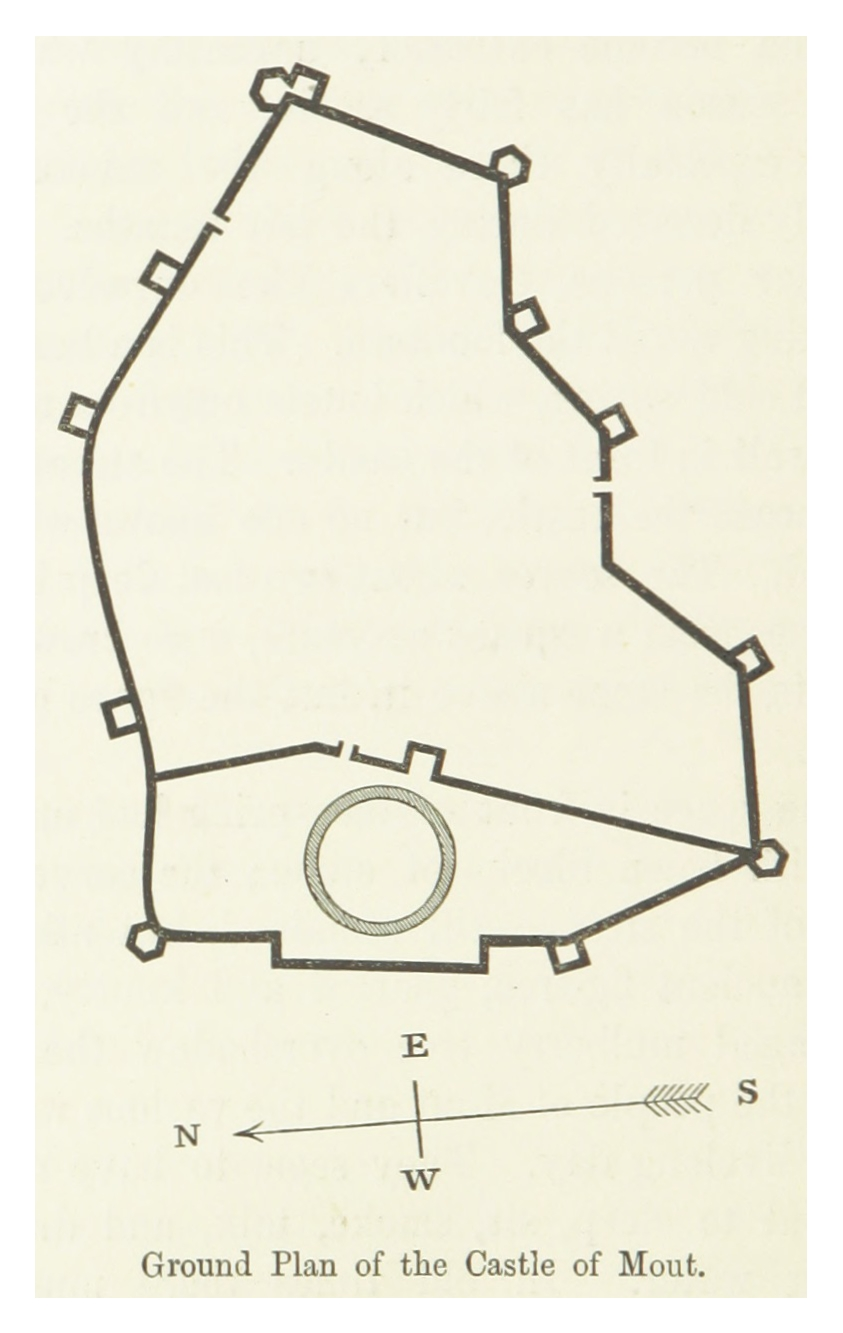
Ground plan of the castle

Mut Castle is a castle in Mut, Mersin Province, Turkey.

== Geography ==
The castle is in mid town at about 36°38′40″N 33°26′02″E. Laal Pasha Mosque is to the east and intercity bus terminal is to the north east. Highway 715, which connects Mersin to Karaman and Konya is northeast of the castle at a distance of about 200 metres (660 ft).

== History ==
The neighbourhood surrounding the castle during the Roman Empire was known as Claudiupolis. According to unconfirmed reports Claudiupolis may be even older than the Roman Empire (up to Hittites). Although the building date of the castle is unknown, it is known that the castle had been used during the Byzantine Empire period. In 1225 the Sultanate of Rum under Kayqubad I captured the castle and rebuilt it. (Mut was frequently used as a co-capital of Karamanids). In 1473, the castle was captured by the Ottoman Empire. During the reign of the Ottoman sultan Ahmet I (1603-1617) the castle was renovated .

== Technical details ==
The plan of the 3,900 square metres (42,000 sq ft) castle is almost square. There are 9 bastions around the fortifications and a small cylindrical inner castle (Turkish: içkale) within the main castle. Face stone and rubble stone were used in the construction.
