= Kösereli =

- Neighbourhood
- Location within Turkey
- Coordinates: 36°42′N 34°10′E
- Country: Turkey
- Province: Mersin
- District: Erdemli
- Elevation: 1,150 m (3,770 ft)
- Population (2022): 211
- Time zone: UTC+3 (TRT)
- Postal code: 33730
- Area code: 0324

Kösereli is a neighbourhood in the municipality and district of Erdemli, Mersin Province, Turkey. Its population is 211 (2022). It is situated in the Toros Mountains. Its distance to Erdemli is 24 kilometres (15 mi) and 60 kilometres (37 mi) to Mersin. The ancestors of the village people were the members of Turkmen Kufralı tribe which was formerly settled in Aşağıköselerli and Yukarıköselerli villages in the Mut district of the Mersin Province. In 1790 some members of the tribe migrated to settle in the present location as a hamlet of Güzelyurt village. In 1954 they gained the legal status of village. The main economic activity of the village is ovine breeding.
