= Selamlı, Mut =

Selamlı
- Neighbourhood
- Location in Turkey
- Coordinates: 36°37′N 33°23′E
- Country: Turkey
- Province: Mersin
- District: Mut
- Elevation: 155 m (509 ft)
- Population (2022): 378
- Time zone: UTC+3 (TRT)
- Postal code: 33600
- Area code: 0324

Selamlı is a neighbourhood in the municipality and district of Mut, Mersin Province, Turkey. Its population is 378 (2022). Selamlı is situated on the east bank of Göksu River. Turkish state highway D.715 is 4 kilometres (2.5 mi) east of the village. Its distance to Mut is 7 kilometres (4.3 mi) and to Mersin is 165 kilometres (103 mi). Main economic activity is farming.
