= Çukurbağ =

Çukurbağ may refer to:

- Çukurbağ, Kaş, a village in Kaş district of Antalya Province, Turkey
- Çukurbağ, Mut, a village in Mut district of Mersin Province, Turkey
- Çukurbağ, Tarsus, a village in Tarsus district of Mersin Province, Turkey
- Çukurbağ, Karaman, a village in Karaman district of Karaman Province, Turkey
