= Yapıntı =

- Neighbourhood
- Location in Turkey
- Coordinates: 36°41′6″N 33°24′4″E
- Country: Turkey
- Province: Mersin
- District: Mut
- Elevation: 165 m (541 ft)
- Population (2022): 943
- Time zone: UTC+3 (TRT)
- Postal code: 33600
- Area code: 0324

Yapıntı is a neighbourhood in the municipality and district of Mut, Mersin Province, Turkey. Its population is 943 (2022). It is on the state highway D.715 just at the lower end of a long ramp from Sertavul Pass. The distance to Mut is 5 kilometres (3.1 mi) and to Mersin is 165 kilometres (103 mi).
