= Ilıca, Mut =

Ilıca
- Neighbourhood
- Location in Turkey
- Coordinates: 36°41′N 33°11′E
- Country: Turkey
- Province: Mersin
- District: Mut
- Elevation: 1,020 m (3,350 ft)
- Population (2022): 497
- Time zone: UTC+3 (TRT)
- Postal code: 33600
- Area code: 0324

Ilıca (literally "Spa") is a neighbourhood in the municipality and district of Mut, Mersin Province, Turkey. Its population is 497 (2022). It is situated in the Toros Mountains to the west of Turkish state highway D.715 and Göksu River. Its distance to Mut is 25 kilometres (16 mi) and to Mersin is 190 kilometres (120 mi). It is a yayla and during the summers the population of the village increases. Main economic activity is agriculture and animal husbandry.
