= Hacıahmetli =

Hacıahmetli is a Turkish place name and may refer to:

- Hacıəhmədli, a village in Barda Rayon, Azerbaijan
- Hacıahmetli, Mut, a village in Mersin Province, Turkey
