= Kışlaköy, Mut =

Kışlaköy
- Neighbourhood
- Location in Turkey
- Coordinates: 36°30′N 33°33′E
- Country: Turkey
- Province: Mersin
- District: Mut
- Elevation: 120 m (390 ft)
- Population (2022): 244
- Time zone: UTC+3 (TRT)
- Postal code: 33600
- Area code: 0324

Kışlaköy is a neighbourhood in the municipality and district of Mut, Mersin Province, Turkey. Its population is 244 (2022). It is situated to the south of Turkish state highway D.715 and to the west of the highway to Gülnar. Göksu River is to the west of the village. Its distance to Mut is 23 kilometres (14 mi) and to Mersin is 140 kilometres (87 mi).
