= Sarıveliler, Mut =

Sarıveliler
- Neighbourhood
- Location in Turkey
- Coordinates: 36°32′N 33°28′E
- Country: Turkey
- Province: Mersin
- District: Mut
- Elevation: 140 m (460 ft)
- Population (2022): 363
- Time zone: UTC+3 (TRT)
- Postal code: 33600
- Area code: 0324

Sarıveliler is a neighbourhood in the municipality and district of Mut, Mersin Province, Turkey. Its population is 363 (2022). It is situated on the west bank of Göksu River. Turkish state highway D.715 is 4 kilometres (2.5 mi) east of the village. Its distance to Mut is 13 kilometres (8.1 mi) and to Mersin is 150 kilometres (93 mi). Main economic activity is farming.
