= Haydarköy, Mut =

Haydarköy
- Neighbourhood
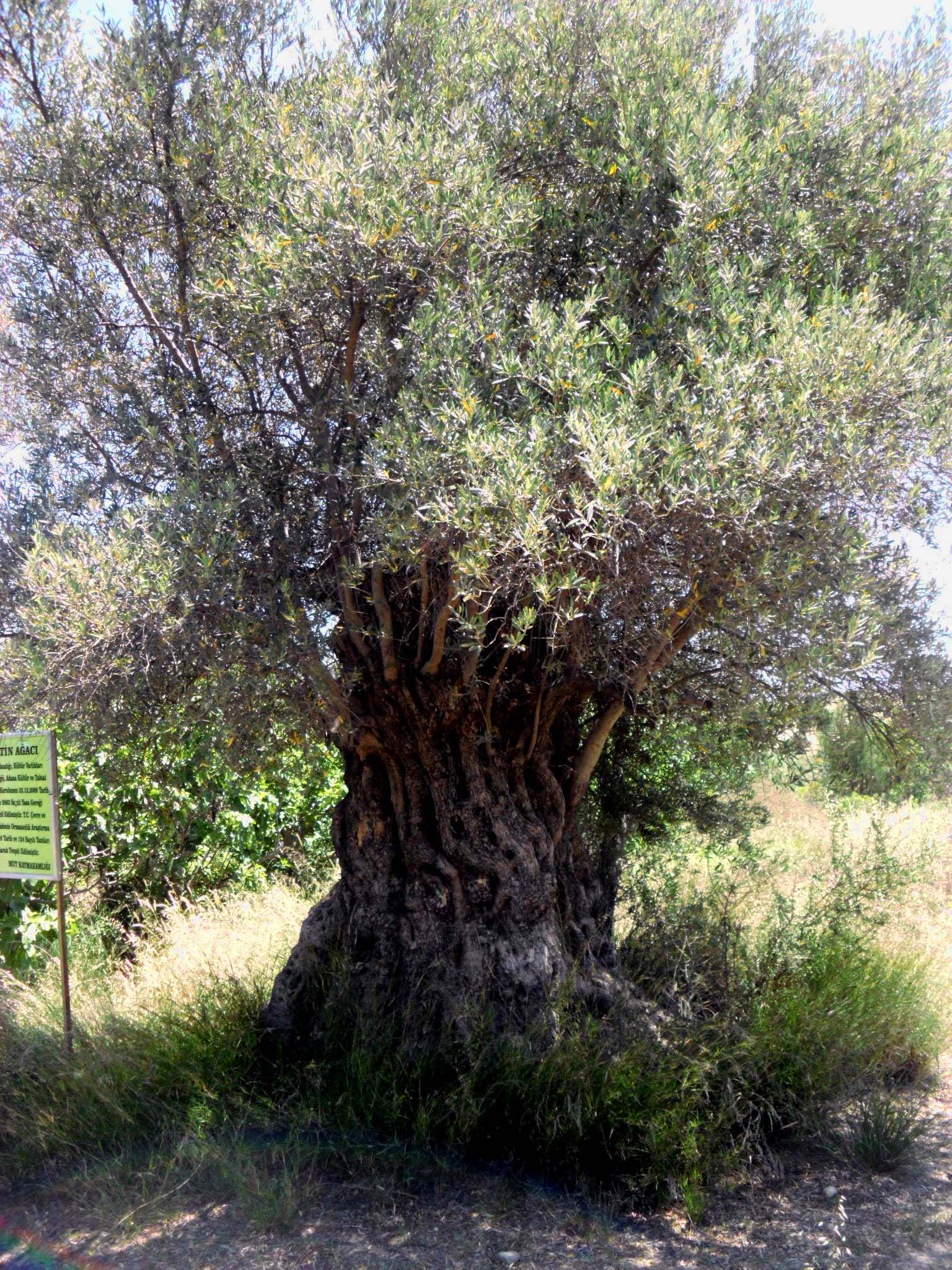
- Monumental tree in Haydarköy

- Location within Turkey
- Coordinates: 36°29′N 33°35′E
- Country: Turkey
- Province: Mersin
- District: Mut
- Elevation: 190 m (620 ft)
- Population (2022): 156
- Time zone: UTC+3 (TRT)
- Postal code: 33600
- Area code: 0324

Haydarköy is a neighbourhood in the municipality and district of Mut, Mersin Province, Turkey. Its population is 156 (2022). It is in the valley of Göksu River in Toros Mountains. It is to the east of Göksu River and to the west of Turkish state highway D.715. Distance to Mut is 32 kilometres (20 mi) and to Mersin is 137 kilometres (85 mi). The name of the village refers to the founder of the village named Haydar. Haydarköy is famous for a monumental olive tree situated just to the west of the village. Its age is determined to be 1300 (oldest in Turkey) by the forestry authorities and it is legally declared as a national monument. The major economic activity of the village is agriculture. Olive, apricot, pomegranate and figs are the main crops.
