= Frederick Barbarossa Memorial (Silifke) =

Memorial in southern Turkey

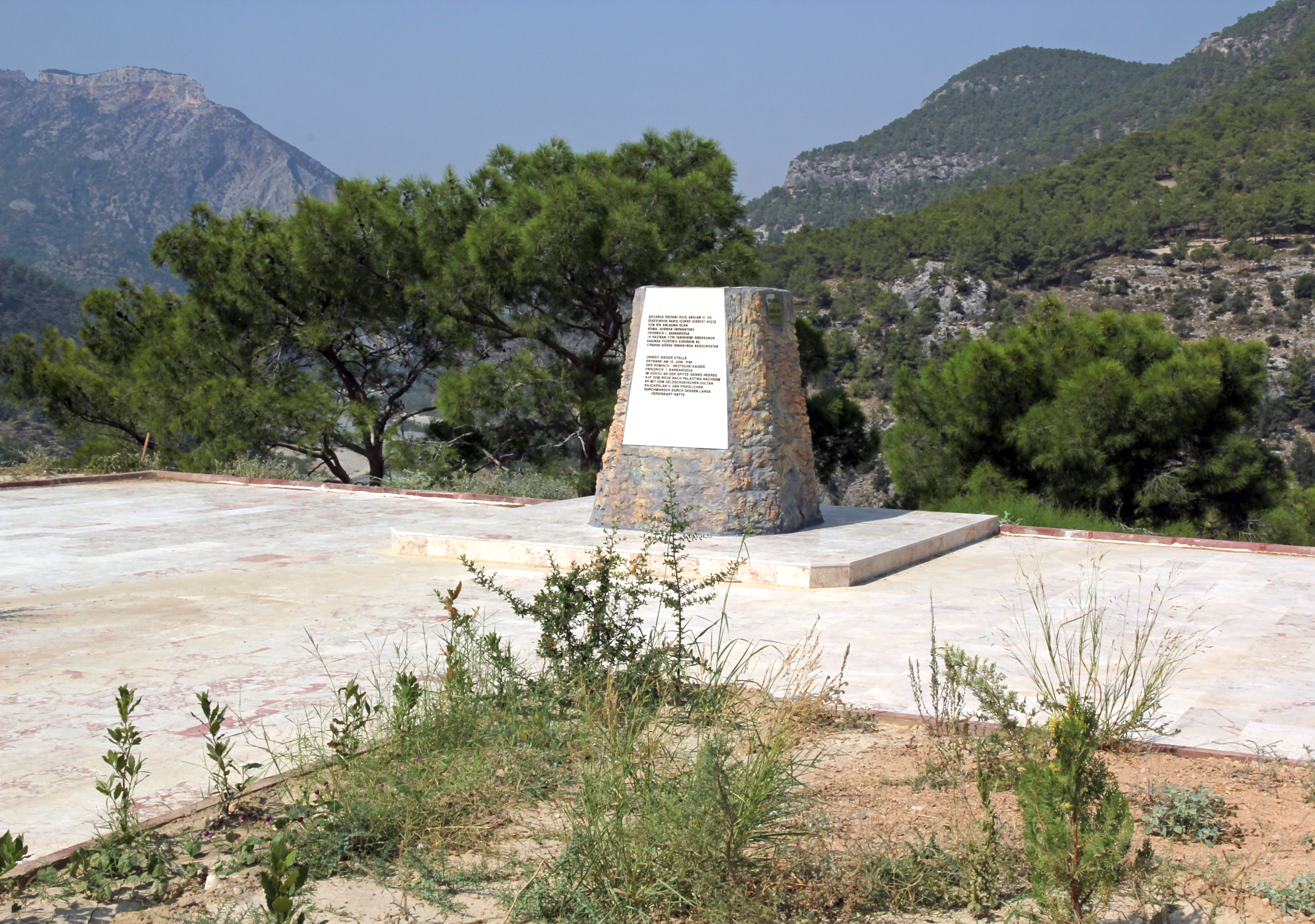
Barbarossa Memorial (without statue).

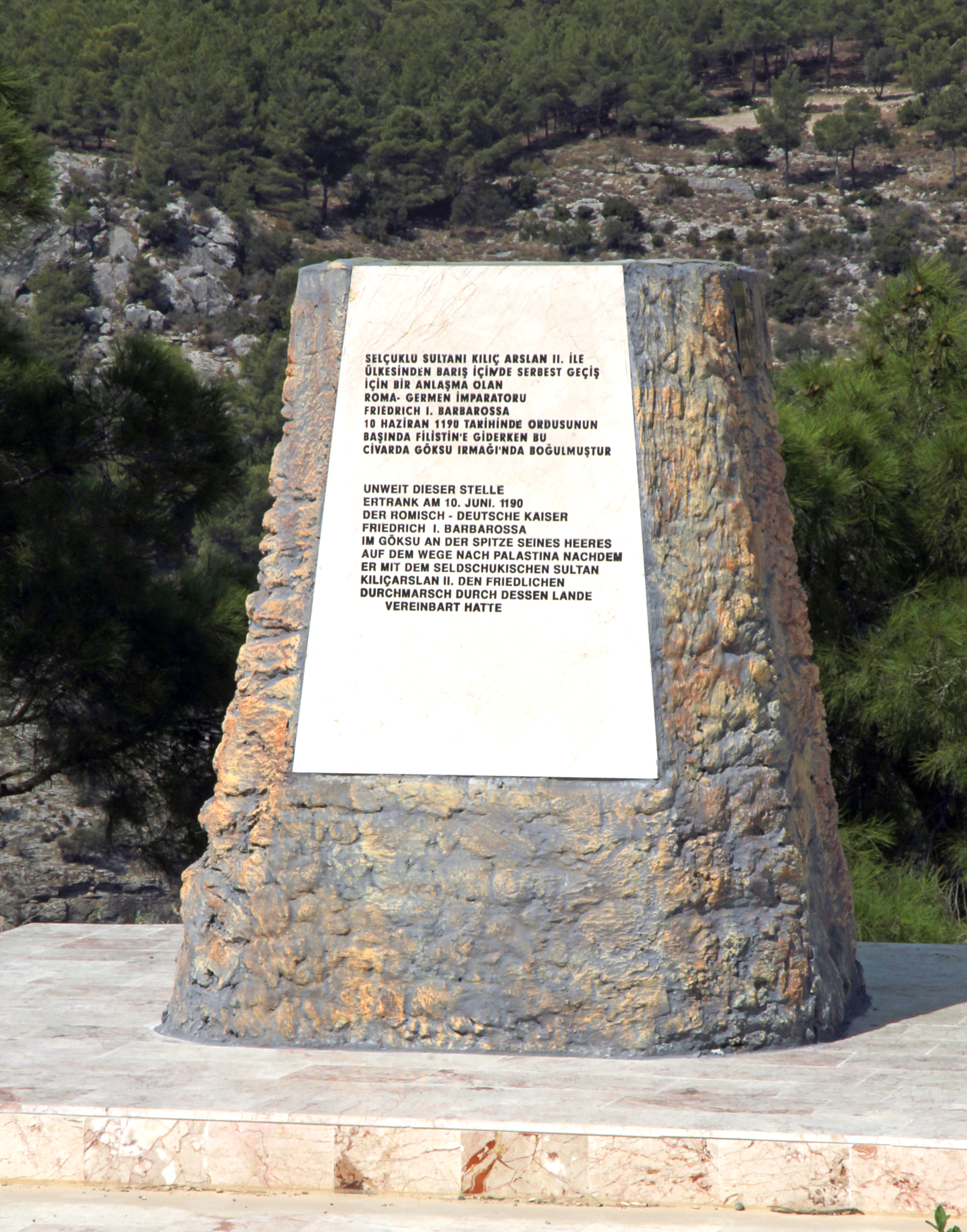
Bilingual inscription.

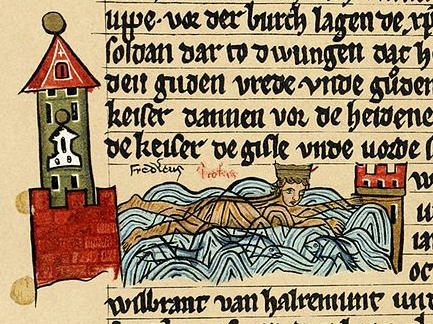
Barbarossa drowns in Göksu River from Sächsische Weltchronik (c. 1280)

Frederick Barbarossa Memorial (Turkish: Frederik Barbaros Anıtı) is a monument dedicated to Holy Roman Emperor Frederick I located in Mersin Province, southern Turkey.

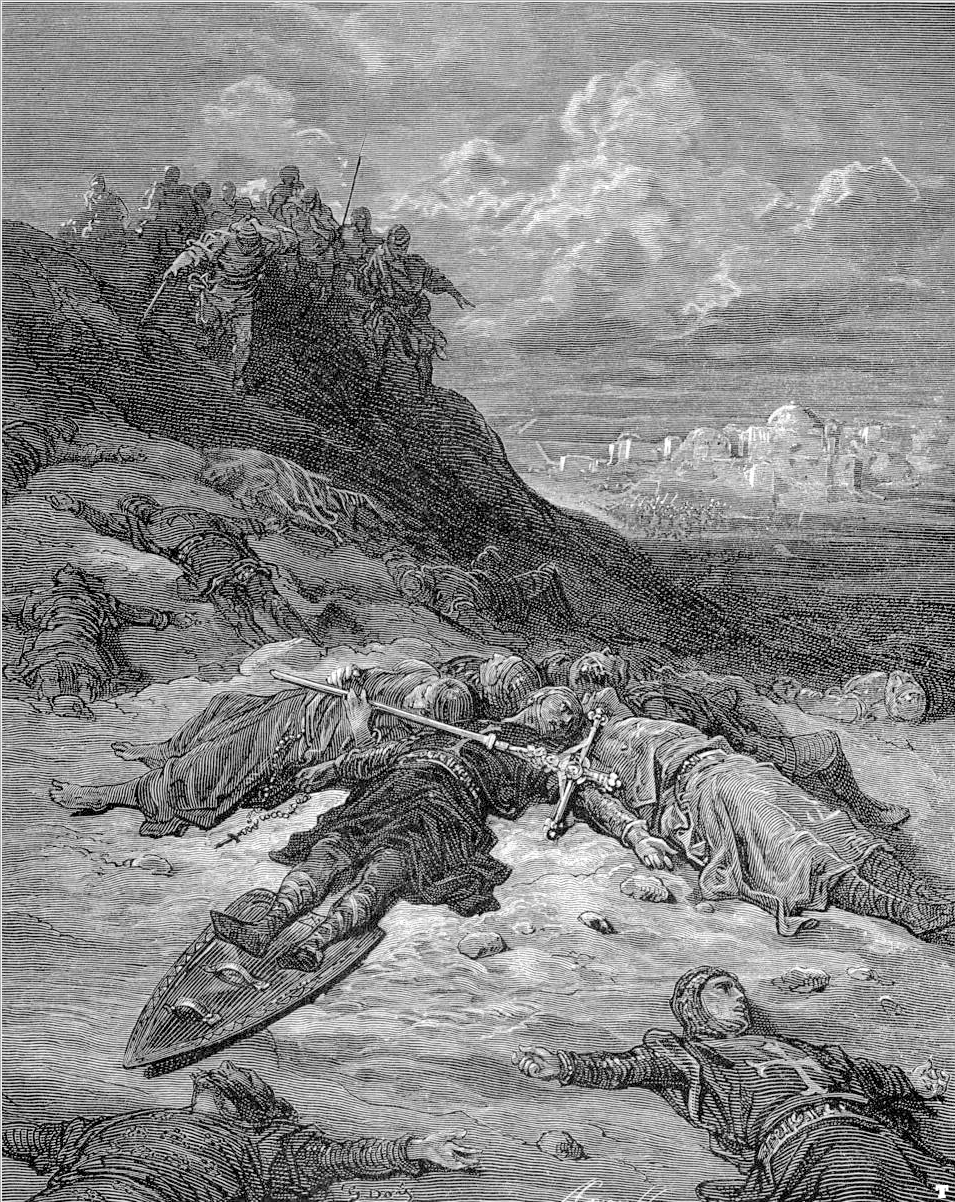
"Death of Frederick of Germany" by Gustave Doré.

== Location ==
It is at 36°23′44.4″N 33°50′36.1″E about 9 km (5.6 mi) west of Silifke and by the state highway D.715. It overlooks the Göksu River and Ekşiler village on the other side of the river.

== History ==
Frederick Barbarossa, Holy Roman Emperor, participated in the Third Crusade (1189–1192). After having left much of Anatolia behind, he drowned on 10 June 1190 in the Saleph River, what is Göksu River today. There are discrepancies in the historical accounts of how exactly Frederick Barbarossa drowned.

== Memorial ==
An inscription was placed close to the point of Frederick's demise by the Embassy of Federal Republic of Germany in 1971. However, when the highway was widened by the General Directorate of Highways, a larger monument with a larger than life statue of the emperor was inaugurated at the present place on 11 May 2012. The new location was determined by the German ambassador Prof. Pascal Hector. The bilingual (German and Turkish) inscription is identical to that of 1971 and reads:

Holy Roman-German Emperor Frederick Barbarossa, who was in friendly agreement with the Seljukid Sultan Kılıçarslan II for a free passage, drowned in Göksu River around this place while going to Palestine with his army.

The text, although not in perfect accord with the historical fact, conveys a peaceful message. (Note: Kılıçarslan II promised the armies of the Third Crusade, led by Frederick Barbarossa to pass freely through his territories; however, his sons who were local chieftains disagreed and fought against the Crusaders at the Battle of Philomelion and Battle of Iconium.) At the time of Frederick's death the region was actually under the control of the Armenian Kingdom of Cilicia.

The statue disappeared a year after the inauguration. Only the base of the monument is left.

== Suggestions ==
According to local historian Dr. Mustafa Erim, Silifke citizens ask for a statue of Kılıçarslan II, who was the Seljukid sultan in 1190, next to that of Frederick Barbarossa.
