= Kemenli, Mut =

Kemenli
- Neighbourhood
- Location in Turkey
- Coordinates: 36°31′N 33°30′E
- Country: Turkey
- Province: Mersin
- District: Mut
- Elevation: 155 m (509 ft)
- Population (2022): 567
- Time zone: UTC+3 (TRT)
- Postal code: 33600
- Area code: 0324

Kemenli is a neighbourhood in the municipality and district of Mut, Mersin Province, Turkey. Its population is 567 (2022). It is in the wide valley of Göksu River in Toros Mountains. It is situated between Göksu River and the Turkish state highway D.715. Its distance to Mut was 18 kilometres (11 mi) and to Mersin is 143 kilometres (89 mi). The main economic activities of the village are animal breeding and agriculture. Main crop is apricot.
