= Irmaklı, Mut =

Irmaklı
- Neighbourhood
- Location in Turkey
- Coordinates: 36°34′N 33°25′E
- Country: Turkey
- Province: Mersin
- District: Mut
- Elevation: 130 m (430 ft)
- Population (2022): 171
- Time zone: UTC+3 (TRT)
- Postal code: 33600
- Area code: 0324

Irmaklı (literally "with river") is a neighbourhood in the municipality and district of Mut, Mersin Province, Turkey, situated on the west bank of Göksu River. The Turkish state highway D.715 is about 4 kilometres (2.5 mi) to the east of the village. Its distance to Mut is 18 kilometres (11 mi) and to Mersin is 155 kilometres (96 mi). Its main economic activity is agriculture and animal husbandry, while its main crops consist of various fruits.

Its population is 171 as of 2022.
