= Silifke HES =

Hydroelectric plant in Turkey

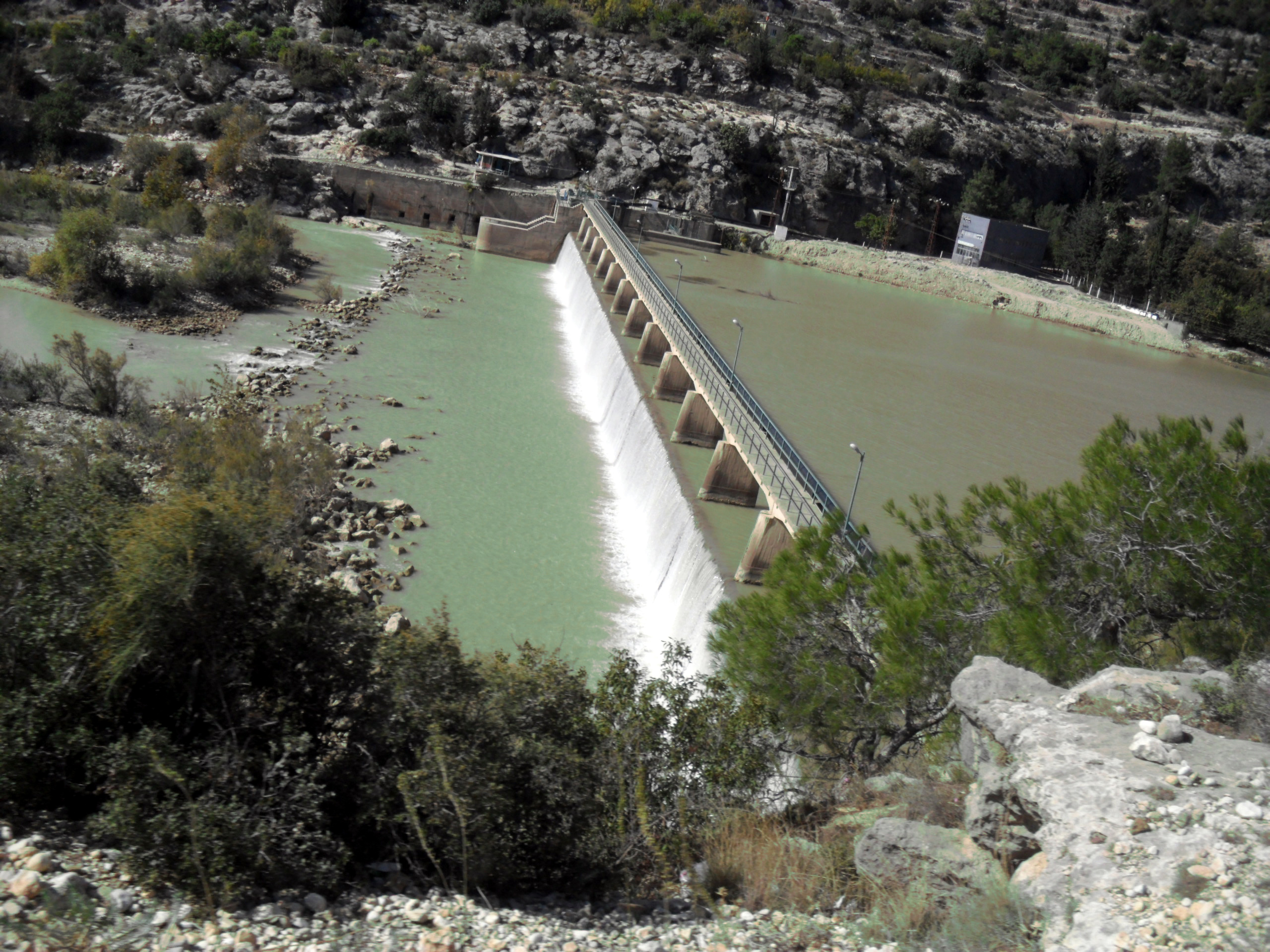
Silifke HES from the east

Silifke HES is a regulator and a low power hydroelectric plant in Turkey.

It is at 36°23′19″N 33°56′34″E in Silifke ilçe (district) of Mersin Province. It is to the east of Turkish state highway D.715 which connects Silifke to north.

The dam is on a channel flowing to Göksu River. Although it is currently owned by EÜAŞ, the public company, soon together with four other low power Hydro electric plants in Mersin Province, it will be privatized.

The annual production is 2 000 000 kWh.
