= Kadıköy, Mut =

Kadıköy
- Neighbourhood
- Location in Turkey
- Coordinates: 36°41′N 33°22′E
- Country: Turkey
- Province: Mersin
- District: Mut
- Elevation: 160 m (520 ft)
- Population (2022): 284
- Time zone: UTC+3 (TRT)
- Postal code: 33600
- Area code: 0324

Kadıköy is a neighbourhood in the municipality and district of Mut, Mersin Province, Turkey. Its population is 284 (2022). It is situated at the west bank of Göksu River. The bridge over the river which connects the villages to the west of Mut to Mut is also called Kadıköy bridge. Its distance to Mut is 9 kilometres (5.6 mi) and to Mersin is 170 kilometres (110 mi). Main economic activity is agriculture and animal husbandry. Main crops are various fruits.
