= Tuğrul =

Tuğrul can refer to:

- Tuğrul, Mut, a village in Mut district of Mersin Province, Turkey
- Tuğrul, Yığılca, a village in the Yığılca District of Düzce Province in Turkey
- Tughril (990-1063), Turkoman founder of the Seljuk Empire
- Toghril (1130-1203), a khan of Keraites

== See also ==
- Turul, a mythological bird of prey in Hungarian tradition
