= Kırkkavak, Mut =

Kırkkavak
- Neighbourhood
- Location in Turkey
- Coordinates: 36°34′N 33°19′E
- Country: Turkey
- Province: Mersin
- District: Mut
- Elevation: 175 m (574 ft)
- Population (2022): 357
- Time zone: UTC+3 (TRT)
- Postal code: 33600
- Area code: 0324

Kırkkavak is a neighbourhood in the municipality and district of Mut, Mersin Province, Turkey. Its population is 357 (2022). It is situated to the south of Göksu River. Its distance to Mut is 25 kilometres (16 mi) and to Mersin is 185 kilometres (115 mi).
