= Derinçay, Mut =

Derinçay
- Neighbourhood
- Location in Turkey
- Coordinates: 36°43′N 33°19′E
- Country: Turkey
- Province: Mersin
- District: Mut
- Elevation: 190 m (620 ft)
- Population (2022): 191
- Time zone: UTC+3 (TRT)
- Postal code: 33600
- Area code: 0324

Derinçay (formerly Hocantı) is a neighbourhood in the municipality and district of Mut, Mersin Province, Turkey. Its population is 191 (2022). It is situated in the valley of Göksu River to the north of Mut. The distance to Mut is 15 kilometres (9.3 mi) and to Mersin is 180 kilometres (110 mi).

The village is an old village founded by Turkmens. The oldest Ottoman documents about the village are of 15th century. Its former name Hocantı may either refer to a certain Hoca Enti, who lived in the Karamanoğlu era, or a settlement in Turkestan. The bridge to the east of the village is a registered as a historical asset by the government. Derinçay economy depends on irrigated farming. Main crops are olives and fruits like apricot, plum, melon and figs.
