= Esençay, Mut =

Esençay
- Neighbourhood
- Location in Turkey
- Coordinates: 36°43′N 33°27′E
- Country: Turkey
- Province: Mersin
- District: Mut
- Elevation: 395 m (1,296 ft)
- Population (2022): 164
- Time zone: UTC+3 (TRT)
- Postal code: 33600
- Area code: 0324

Esençay is a neighbourhood in the municipality and district of Mut, Mersin Province, Turkey. Its population is 164 (2022). It is to the east of the Göksu River valley in the Taurus Mountains. Its distance to Mut is 9 kilometres (5.6 mi) and to Mersin is 194 kilometres (121 mi).
