= Özköy, Mut =

Özköy
- Neighbourhood
- Location in Turkey
- Coordinates: 36°29′18″N 33°30′21″E
- Country: Turkey
- Province: Mersin
- District: Mut
- Elevation: 160 m (520 ft)
- Population (2022): 94
- Time zone: UTC+3 (TRT)
- Postal code: 33600
- Area code: 0324

Özköy is a neighbourhood in the municipality and district of Mut, Mersin Province, Turkey. Its population is 94 (2022). It is situated in the peneplain area to the west of the Göksu River. Its distance to Mut is 22 kilometres (14 mi) and to Mersin is 165 kilometres (103 mi).
