= Çağlayangedik =

- Neighbourhood
- Location in Turkey
- Coordinates: 36°30′N 33°35′E
- Country: Turkey
- Province: Mersin
- District: Mut
- Elevation: 220 m (720 ft)
- Population (2022): 77
- Time zone: UTC+3 (TRT)
- Postal code: 33600
- Area code: 0324

Çağlayangedik is a neighbourhood in the municipality and district of Mut, Mersin Province, Turkey. Its population is 77 (2022). It is situated to the west of D.715. The distance to Mut is 23 kilometres (14 mi) and to Mersin is 142 kilometres (88 mi). The main agricultural products of the village are apricot, fig and olive.
