= Geçimli, Mut =

Geçimli
- Neighbourhood
- Location in Turkey
- Coordinates: 36°48′N 33°20′E
- Country: Turkey
- Province: Mersin
- District: Mut
- Elevation: 860 m (2,820 ft)
- Population (2022): 385
- Time zone: UTC+3 (TRT)
- Postal code: 33600
- Area code: 0324

Geçimli (also called Malya) is a neighbourhood in the municipality and district of Mut, Mersin Province. Turkey. Its population is 385 (2022). It is situated to the west of Turkish state highway D.715 and to the northwest of Mut. The distance to Mut is 25 kilometres (16 mi) and to Mersin is 185 kilometres (115 mi).

== History ==
There are two archaeologically important places in the vicinity of the village. Alaoda Cave is a Cave Chapel and it is unearthed by Michael Gouche in 1955. Alahan Monastery (which is in the tentative list of World Heritage Sites ) is situated at 6 kilometres (3.7 mi) east of Geçimli.

== Economy ==
The main economic activity of the village is agriculture. Olive and apricot are two of the main crops.
