= Hacısait =

- Neighbourhood
- Location in Turkey
- Coordinates: 36°29′N 33°26′E
- Country: Turkey
- Province: Mersin
- District: Mut
- Elevation: 215 m (705 ft)
- Population (2022): 86
- Time zone: UTC+3 (TRT)
- Postal code: 33600
- Area code: 0324

Hacısait is a neighbourhood in the municipality and district of Mut, Mersin Province, Turkey. Its population is 86 (2022). It is situated to the west of the Göksu River valley. Its distance to Mut is 35 kilometres (22 mi) and to Mersin is 155 kilometres (96 mi).
