= Burunköy, Mut =

Burunköy
- Neighbourhood
- Location in Turkey
- Coordinates: 36°44′N 33°23′E
- Country: Turkey
- Province: Mersin
- District: Mut
- Elevation: 550 m (1,800 ft)
- Population (2022): 263
- Time zone: UTC+3 (TRT)
- Postal code: 33600
- Area code: 0324

Burunköy is a neighbourhood in the municipality and district of Mut, Mersin Province, Turkey. Its population is 263 (2022). It is a mountain village on the state highway D.715 which connects Mut and Silifke to Central Anatolia. The distance to Mut is 10 kilometres (6.2 mi) and to Mersin is 175 kilometres (109 mi).
