= Çortak =

- Neighbourhood
- Location in Turkey
- Coordinates: 36°31′N 33°36′E
- Country: Turkey
- Province: Mersin
- District: Mut
- Elevation: 310 m (1,020 ft)
- Population (2022): 179
- Time zone: UTC+3 (TRT)
- Postal code: 33600
- Area code: 0324

Çortak is a neighbourhood in the municipality and district of Mut, Mersin Province, Turkey. Its population is 179 (2022). It is situated in the Taurus Mountains to the east of the Turkish state highway D.715. The distance to Mut is 25 kilometres (16 mi) and to Mersin is 140 kilometres (87 mi).
