= Gökçetaş, Mut =

Gökçetaş
- Neighbourhood
- Location in Turkey
- Coordinates: 36°53′N 33°10′E
- Country: Turkey
- Province: Mersin
- District: Mut
- Elevation: 685 m (2,247 ft)
- Population (2022): 573
- Time zone: UTC+3 (TRT)
- Postal code: 33600
- Area code: 0324

Gökçetaş is a neighbourhood in the municipality and district of Mut, Mersin Province, Turkey. Its population is 573 (2022). It is situated to the east of Göksu River valley. Its distance to Mut is 65 kilometres (40 mi) and to Mersin is 225 kilometres (140 mi).

The village is an old village. During the reign of Ottoman sultan Beyazıt II (15th century), it was known as Sekitler. The origin of the population was Abdal, a religious group, which migrated from Central Anatolia following the campaigns of Gedik Ahmet Pasha. Later it was renamed as Sanşa and after 1960 as Gökçetaş. The main economic activities are agriculture and animal breeding.
