= Topkaya, Mut =

Topkaya
- Neighbourhood
- Location in Turkey
- Coordinates: 36°50′N 33°06′E
- Country: Turkey
- Province: Mersin
- District: Mut
- Elevation: 580 m (1,900 ft)
- Population (2022): 128
- Time zone: UTC+3 (TRT)
- Postal code: 33600
- Area code: 0324

Topkaya is a neighbourhood in the municipality and district of Mut, Mersin Province, Turkey. Its population is 128 (2022). It is situated in the plateaus of the Toros Mountains. The Göksu River flows about 3 kilometres (1.9 mi) to the east of the village Its distance to Mut is 60 kilometres (37 mi) and to Mersin is 225 kilometres (140 mi).
