= Diştaş =

- Neighbourhood
- Location in Turkey
- Coordinates: 36°48′N 33°16′E
- Country: Turkey
- Province: Mersin
- District: Mut
- Elevation: 635 m (2,083 ft)
- Population (2022): 532
- Time zone: UTC+3 (TRT)
- Postal code: 33600
- Area code: 0324

Diştaş is a neighbourhood in the municipality and district of Mut, Mersin Province, Turkey. Its population is 532 (2022). It is situated in the valley of Göksu River. The distance to Mut is 33 kilometres (21 mi) and to Mersin is 193 kilometres (120 mi).
