= Kurtuluş, Mersin =

Kurtuluş, Mersin is the name of two villages in Mersin Province of Turkey.

- Kurtuluş, Mut a village in Mut district
- Kurtuluş, Silifke a village in Silifke district
