= Kelceköy, Mut =

Kelceköy
- Neighbourhood
- Location in Turkey
- Coordinates: 36°39′N 33°28′E
- Country: Turkey
- Province: Mersin
- District: Mut
- Elevation: 485 m (1,591 ft)
- Population (2022): 563
- Time zone: UTC+3 (TRT)
- Postal code: 33600
- Area code: 0324

Kelceköy is a neighbourhood in the municipality and district of Mut, Mersin Province, Turkey. Its population is 563 (2022). It is situated to the east of Göksu River valley and Mut. It is almost merged to Mut and its distance to Mersin is 166 kilometres (103 mi). The main agricultural products of the village are apricot and olive. The village is inhabited by Tahtacı.
