= Ekşiler, Silifke =

Ekşiler
- Neighbourhood
- Location in Turkey
- Coordinates: 36°23′N 33°52′E
- Country: Turkey
- Province: Mersin
- District: Silifke
- Elevation: 300 m (980 ft)
- Population (2022): 113
- Time zone: UTC+3 (TRT)
- Postal code: 33940
- Area code: 0324

Ekşiler (also called Eşkiler) is a neighbourhood in the municipality and district of Silifke, Mersin Province, Turkey. Its population is 113 (2022). It is situated in the Göksu River valley. The village is to the north of Göksu River and Turkish state highway D.715. Its distance to Silifke is 10 kilometres (6.2 mi) and to Mersin is 95 kilometres (59 mi). The main economic activities of the village are farming and animal breeding.
