= Yeşilköy, Mut =

Yeşilköy
- Neighbourhood
- Location in Turkey
- Coordinates: 36°31′N 33°21′E
- Country: Turkey
- Province: Mersin
- District: Mut
- Elevation: 480 m (1,570 ft)
- Population (2022): 277
- Time zone: UTC+3 (TRT)
- Postal code: 33600
- Area code: 0324

Yeşilköy is a neighbourhood in the municipality and district of Mut, Mersin Province, Turkey. Its population is 277 (2022). It is situated in the west side of Göksu River in the Taurus Mountains. Its distance to Mut is 28 kilometres (17 mi) and to Mersin is 168 kilometres (104 mi).
