= Alaçam, Mut =

Alaçam
- Neighbourhood
- Location in Turkey
- Coordinates: 36°42′N 33°16′E
- Country: Turkey
- Province: Mersin
- District: Mut
- Elevation: 560 m (1,840 ft)
- Population (2022): 704
- Time zone: UTC+3 (TRT)
- Postal code: 33600
- Area code: 0324

Alaçam is a neighbourhood in the municipality and district of Mut, Mersin Province, Turkey. Its population is 704 (2022). It is situated to the northwest of Mut and south of Magras Mountain a part of Taurus Mountains. Distance to Mut is 22 kilometres (14 mi) and to Mersin is 182 kilometres (113 mi).

The first reference to the village is dated at 1913. The origin of the population was probably a Turkmen tribe named Karadöneli. The main economic activity is agriculture. But irrigation is an important problem. Main crops of the village are cereals and grapes which require little irrigation. Towards Göksu River to east olive and apricot are also produced.
