= Çatalharman =

Çatalharman can refer to:

- Çatalharman, Elâzığ
- Çatalharman, Mut
