= Ortaköy, Mut =

Ortaköy
- Neighbourhood
- Location in Turkey
- Coordinates: 36°41′N 33°25′E
- Country: Turkey
- Province: Mersin
- District: Mut
- Elevation: 185 m (607 ft)
- Population (2022): 227
- Time zone: UTC+3 (TRT)
- Postal code: 33600
- Area code: 0324

Ortaköy is a neighbourhood in the municipality and district of Mut, Mersin Province, Turkey. Its population is 227 (2022). It is on the state highway D.715. The distance to Mut is 4 kilometres (2.5 mi) and to Mersin is 165 kilometres (103 mi). Main economic activity is agriculture. Population of this settlement are from Abdal origin and they are Alevi Muslims.

== History ==
Ortaköy (formerly Kıpti) is one of the villages established in the last years of the Ottoman Empire. As a matter of fact, according to the report submitted to the Ottoman Government on the administrative structure of Mut, dated December 2, 1913, Ortaköy is a neighbourhood with 24 households, a population of 160 (73 women, 87 men) and registered as “Kıpti” affiliated to the central district of Mut. Village people are from Abdal origin who migrated from Khorasan in the Middle Ages to Anatolia.

== Population ==
Historical population

Year	Pop.	±% p.a.
1913	160	—
1935	71	−3.63%
1940	147	+15.67%
1950	81	−5.79%
1970	127	+2.27%
1975	218	+11.41%
1980	263	+3.82%
1985	287	+1.76%

Year	Pop.	±% p.a.
1990	276	−0.78%
1997	180	−5.92%
2000	198	+3.23%
2007	193	−0.36%
2012	228	+3.39%
2017	239	+0.95%
2022	227	−1.02%

Source: Population censuses (1913-2000) and TÜIK (2007-2022)

According to the Ottoman documents, Ortaköy, was known as "Kıpti" or "Mutkiptiyan", had a population of 160 people (73 women, 87 men) in 24 households in 1913. It is noteworthy that the village population followed an unstable course in the Republic period. The population, which was 71 in 1935, increased to 147 in 1940; Then it started to decline and fell to 117 in 1945. The highest population figure that can be seen was 287 people in 1985; but it started to decline again in the following years.

== Geography ==
It is 163 km from the center of Mersin and 3 km from the center of Mut. It is located on a flat land on the Karaman asphalt, north of Mut. The whitewashed houses of Ortaköy are clustered together on the plain at the base of a small hill to the right of the highway. Among the houses, fruit trees such as figs, plums, pomegranates and mulberries draw attention. The small hill to the north of the village is almost completely bare except for a few bushes on it. The hills to the south are covered with sparse pine trees and bushes.
