= Silifke Castle =

Medieval castle in Mersin Province, Turkey

- Silifke, Mersin Province, Turkey
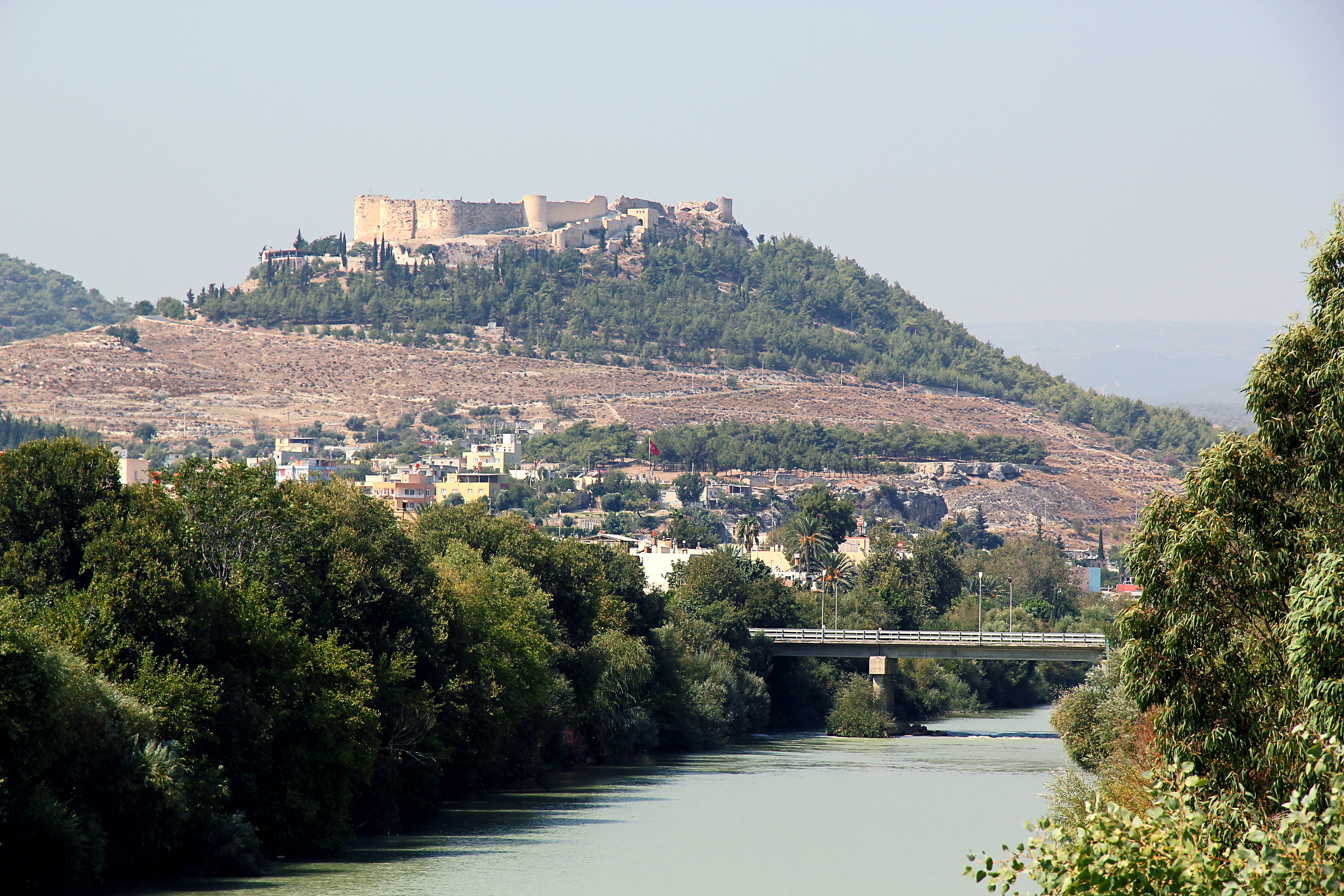

Site information
- Type: Fortress
- Open to the public: Yes
- Condition: Large sections of walls are still standing.

Location
- Location of Silifke Castle
- Coordinates: 36°22′35″N 33°54′56″E

Site history
- Built by: Byzantine Empire
- Demolished: Partially

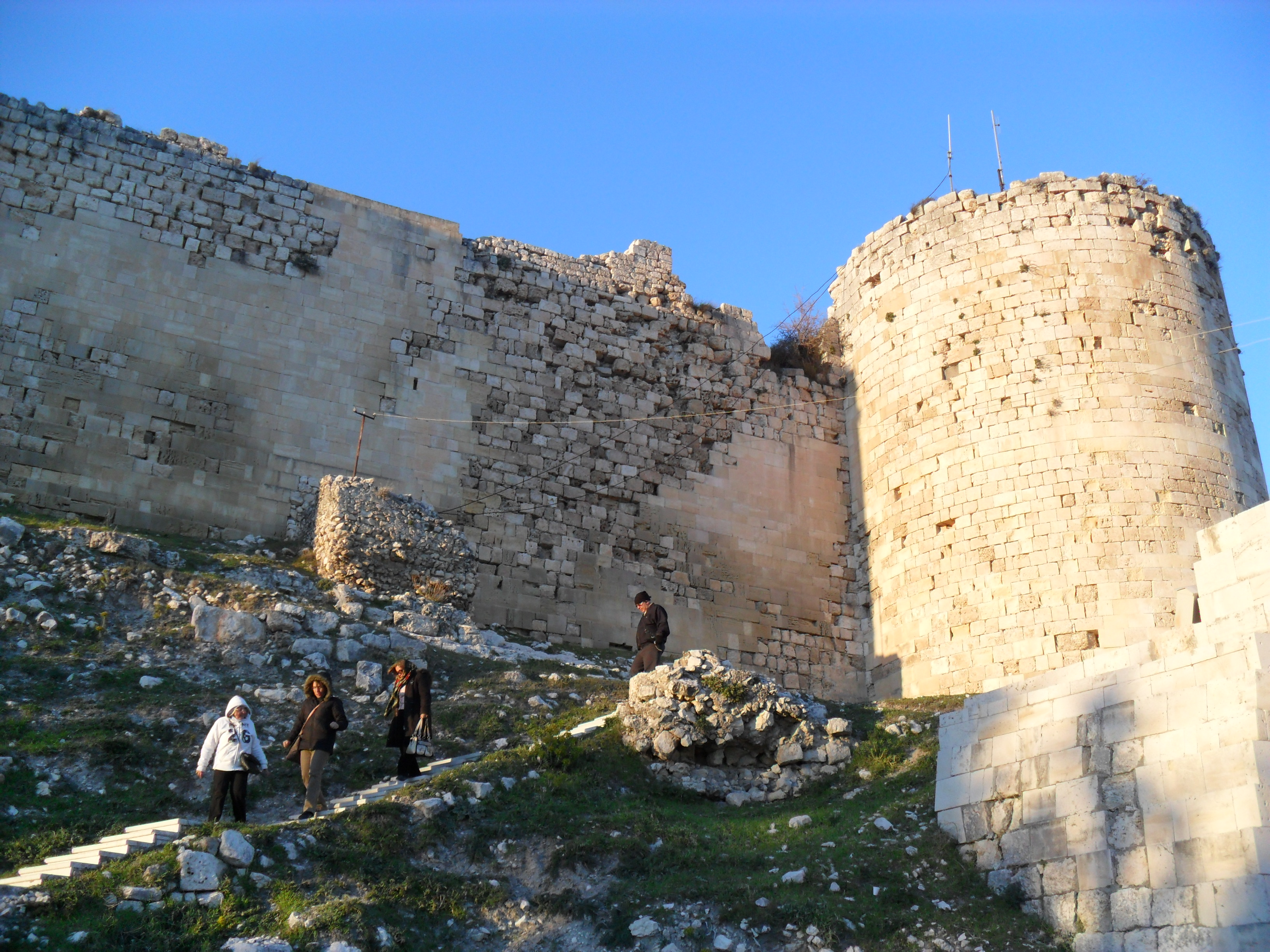

Silifke Castle (Turkish: Silifke kalesi) is a medieval castle in Turkey.

== Geography ==
The castle is in Silifke district of Mersin Province. It is situated to the west of Silifke city center, to the south of Göksu River (Calydanus of the antiquity) and to the north of the Turkish state highway D.715. Although its altitude is only 160 metres (520 ft) with respect to sea level, it is dominant over Silifke plains and the southern section of Göksu valley.

== History ==
Silifke (Roman: Seleucia; Byzantine: kastron Seleukeias; Arab: Salûqiya; Armenian: Selefkia or Selewkia; Frankish: Le Selef) was an important city in antiquity. Founded by and named after Seleucus I Nicator (359 BC-281 BC), one of the Diadochi who served as an infantry general under Alexander the Great. Few traces of the 3rd-century-B.C. settlement survive. There are fragments of a late Roman theater, necropolis, bath, 2nd-century temple, as well as a 5th-century Byzantines cistern. The 1st-century-A.D. stone bridge built during the reign of Emperor Vespasian was replaced in the 1870s. In the late 7th century, to counter Arab invasions, the Byzantines fortified the acropolis, which is situated above the Calycadnus River. The site had a weapons factory and was the administrative center for the coastal theme. In the late-1180s the Rubenid Baron Leo II, who became a decade later Leo I, King of Armenian Cilicia, captured the town and fortress. In exchange for money and cavalry support King Leo granted the castle in 1210 to the Knights Hospitaller who were to defend the western border of his kingdom from the Seljuk Turks. According to a survey published in 1987, most of the present castle is a Crusader construction. On the death of King Leo in 1219 his daughter and designated heiress Zapēl, (also known as Isabella, Queen of Armenian Cilicia), was contracted to marry Philip, the son of Bohemond IV of Antioch. After various disputes with the Armenian barons Philip died by poison in 1226. Zapēl and her mother took refuge in Silifke. When the Armenian army arrived, the Franks surrendered the castle. A fragmentary Armenian inscription in the castle may record its repair or enlargement in 1236. In 1248 the castle may have briefly had a Frankish commander, named Guiscard.

== Details ==
The castle has an oval-shaped plan. The length from west to east is about 250 meters (820 ft) and the width is about 75 meters (246 ft). It is surrounded by a dry moat. According to the 17th-century Turkish traveler, Evliya Çelebi, there were 23 towers, 60 houses and a mosque in the castle. Presently, 10 towers survive, many of which have surviving vaulted ceilings. An equal number of finely crafted under-crofts are preserved, some with pointed vaults. Most of the exterior facing stones consist of well-drafted ashlar blocks. A formal survey of the castle was conducted in 1979.

== See also ==
- List of Crusader castles
