= Yukarıköselerli =

- Neighbourhood
- Location within Turkey
- Coordinates: 36°34′N 33°24′E
- Country: Turkey
- Province: Mersin
- District: Mut
- Elevation: 160 m (520 ft)
- Population (2022): 633
- Time zone: UTC+3 (TRT)
- Postal code: 33600
- Area code: 0324

Yukarıköselerli is a neighbourhood in the municipality and district of Mut, Mersin Province, Turkey. Its population is 633 (2022). It is in the wide valley of Göksu River in the Taurus Mountains. Its distance to Mut is 17 kilometres (11 mi) and to Mersin is 143 kilometres (89 mi).

== History ==
The former name of the village was Kulfalı which was actually the name of the Turkmen tribe which founded the village in the 14th century. Kösreli and Köselerli are the corrupt forms of Kulfalı. They were the subjects of Karamanoğlu Beylik. But eventually the two wings of the village were issued from each other. After 1927, those who settled to the east of the river were called Aşağıköselerli ("lower Köselerli") and those who settled to the south and west of the river were called Yukarıköselerli ("upper Köselerli").

== Economy ==
The main economic activity is farming. Although quite close to Turkish state highway D.715, transportation to main cities in winter is difficult because of the river. Now a bridge is under construction. When finished, the bridge will facilitate the transportation and thus boost the trade.
