= Kurtsuyu =

Kurtsuyu can refer to:

- Kurtsuyu, Düzce
- Kurtsuyu, Mut
