= Hacıilyaslı =

- Neighbourhood
- Location in Turkey
- Coordinates: 36°41′N 33°20′E
- Country: Turkey
- Province: Mersin
- District: Mut
- Elevation: 315 m (1,033 ft)
- Population (2022): 378
- Time zone: UTC+3 (TRT)
- Postal code: 33600
- Area code: 0324

Hacıilyaslı is a neighbourhood in the municipality and district of Mut, Mersin Province, Turkey. Its population is 378 (2022). It is situated in the Göksu River valley. Its distance to Mut is 15 kilometres (9.3 mi) and to Mersin is 175 kilometres (109 mi). The village was founded by a Turkmen tribe named Karadöneli. Main economic activity is animal husbandry. Valuable produce cultivated at Hacıilyaslı include olive agricultural crops.
