= Hamamköy =

- Neighbourhood
- Location in Turkey
- Coordinates: 36°38′N 33°21′E
- Country: Turkey
- Province: Mersin
- District: Mut
- Elevation: 200 m (660 ft)
- Population (2022): 1,450
- Time zone: UTC+3 (TRT)
- Postal code: 33600
- Area code: 0324

Hamamköy (also: Hamam) is a neighbourhood in the municipality and district of Mut, Mersin Province, Turkey. Its population is 1,450 (2022). The name of the village hamam means bath in Turkish and it may refer to Göksu River running at the east of the village. Its distance to Mut is 10 kilometres (6.2 mi) and to Mersin is 170 kilometres (110 mi).
