= Hocalı, Mut =

Hocalı
- Neighbourhood
- Location in Turkey
- Coordinates: 36°29′N 33°37′E
- Country: Turkey
- Province: Mersin
- District: Mut
- Elevation: 280 m (920 ft)
- Population (2022): 109
- Time zone: UTC+3 (TRT)
- Postal code: 33600
- Area code: 0324

Hocalı is a neighbourhood in the municipality and district of Mut, Mersin Province, Turkey. Its population is 109 (2022). It is situated to the east of Turkish state highway D.715. Its distance to Mut is 28 kilometres (17 mi) and to Mersin is 132 kilometres (82 mi). The main economic activity is agriculture. Apricot, plum, and olive are the main crops.
