= Elbeyli, Mut =

Elbeyli
- Neighbourhood
- Location in Turkey
- Coordinates: 36°37′N 33°26′E
- Country: Turkey
- Province: Mersin
- District: Mut
- Elevation: 280 m (920 ft)
- Population (2022): 429
- Time zone: UTC+3 (TRT)
- Postal code: 33600
- Area code: 0324

Elbeyli is a neighbourhood in the municipality and district of Mut, Mersin Province, Turkey. Its population is 429 (2022). It is situated to the west of Turkish state highway D.715. The distance to Mut is 4 kilometres (2.5 mi) and to Mersin is 158 kilometres (98 mi).
