= Kurtsuyu, Mut =

Kurtsuyu
- Neighbourhood
- Location in Turkey
- Coordinates: 36°30′N 33°32′E
- Country: Turkey
- Province: Mersin
- District: Mut
- Elevation: 100 m (330 ft)
- Population (2022): 124
- Time zone: UTC+3 (TRT)
- Postal code: 33600
- Area code: 0324

Kurtsuyu is a neighbourhood in the municipality and district of Mut, Mersin Province, Turkey. Its population is 124 (2022). It is in the valley of Göksu River in Toros Mountains. It is situated by the small creek Kurtsuyu which flows to Göksu River. It is also on the Turkish state highway D.715. Distance to Mut is 20 kilometres (12 mi) and to Mersin is 140 kilometres (87 mi). The major economic activity of the village is agriculture. Olive, apricot and figs are the main crops.
