= Karadiken =

Karadiken (literally black thorn) is a Turkish place name and it may refer to:

- Karadiken, Ulus a village in Ulus district of Bartın Province
- Karadiken, Sütçüler, a village, in Sütçüler District of Isparta Province
- Karadiken, Tarsus, a village in Tarsus district of Mersin Province
- Karadiken, Mut a village in Mut district of Mersin Province
