= Gençali, Mut =

Gençali
- Neighbourhood
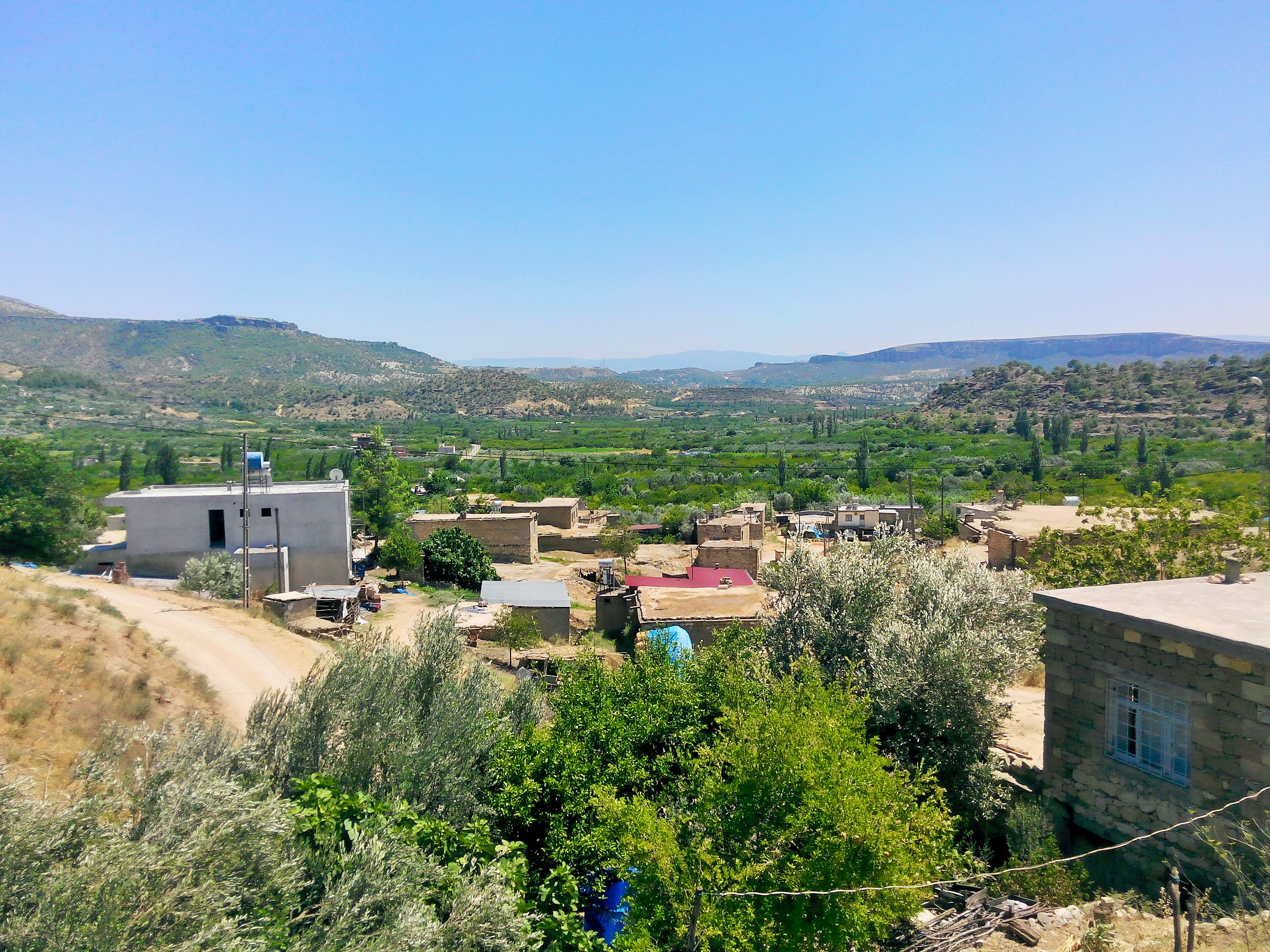

- Location within Turkey
- Coordinates: 36°42′11″N 33°25′23″E
- Country: Turkey
- Province: Mersin
- District: Mut
- Elevation: 275 m (902 ft)
- Population (2022): 278
- Time zone: UTC+3 (TRT)
- Postal code: 33600
- Area code: 0324

Gençali is a neighbourhood in the municipality and district of Mut, Mersin Province, Turkey. Its population is 278 (2022). It is situated in the Toros Mountains to the east of Göksu River valley. Its distance to Mut is 8 kilometres (5.0 mi) and to Mersin is 173 kilometres (107 mi). The village was founded by two Turkmen tribes named Koçaşlı and Meçesli. Main economic activity is agriculture.
