= Güzelyurt, Mut =

Güzelyurt
- Neighbourhood
- Location in Turkey
- Coordinates: 36°50′N 33°12′E
- Country: Turkey
- Province: Mersin
- District: Mut
- Elevation: 630 m (2,070 ft)
- Population (2022): 103
- Time zone: UTC+3 (TRT)
- Postal code: 33600
- Area code: 0324

Güzelyurt is a neighbourhood in the municipality and district of Mut, Mersin Province, Turkey. Its population is 103 (2022). It is located in the Göksu River valley to the north of Mut. Its distance to Mut is 45 kilometres (28 mi) and to Mersin is 205 kilometres (127 mi). Village economy depends agriculture.
