= Mucuk, Mut =

Mucuk
- Neighbourhood
- Location in Turkey
- Coordinates: 36°35′N 33°22′E
- Country: Turkey
- Province: Mersin
- District: Mut
- Elevation: 185 m (607 ft)
- Population (2022): 65
- Time zone: UTC+3 (TRT)
- Postal code: 33600
- Area code: 0324

Mucuk is a neighbourhood in the municipality and district of Mut, Mersin Province, Turkey. Its population is 65 (2022). It is situated to the south of Göksu River. Its distance to Mut is 20 kilometres (12 mi) and to Mersin is 178 kilometres (111 mi).
