= Hisarköy, Mut =

Hisarköy
- Neighbourhood
- Location in Turkey
- Coordinates: 36°32′N 33°34′E
- Country: Turkey
- Province: Mersin
- District: Mut
- Elevation: 215 m (705 ft)
- Population (2022): 146
- Time zone: UTC+3 (TRT)
- Postal code: 33600
- Area code: 0324

Hisarköy is a neighbourhood in the municipality and district of Mut, Mersin Province, Turkey. Its population is 146 (2022). It is situated to the east of Göksu River valley. Its distance to Mut is 32 kilometres (20 mi) and to Mersin is 137 kilometres (85 mi). Main economic activity is agriculture. Apricot, plum and olive are the main crops.
