= Yıldızköy, Mut =

Yıldızköy
- Neighbourhood
- Location in Turkey
- Coordinates: 36°43′N 33°28′E
- Country: Turkey
- Province: Mersin
- District: Mut
- Elevation: 450 m (1,480 ft)
- Population (2022): 143
- Time zone: UTC+3 (TRT)
- Postal code: 33600
- Area code: 0324

Yıldızköy is a neighbourhood in the municipality and district of Mut, Mersin Province, Turkey. Its population is 143 (2022). It is to the east of the Göksu River valley in the Taurus Mountains. Its distance to Mut is 10 kilometres (6.2 mi) and to Mersin is 195 kilometres (121 mi).
