= Topluca, Mut =

Topluca
- Neighbourhood
- Location in Turkey
- Coordinates: 36°42′N 33°28′E
- Country: Turkey
- Province: Mersin
- District: Mut
- Elevation: 580 m (1,900 ft)
- Population (2022): 520
- Time zone: UTC+3 (TRT)
- Postal code: 33600
- Area code: 0324

Topluca is a neighbourhood in the municipality and district of Mut, Mersin Province, Turkey. Its population is 520 (2022). It is located to the east of Göksu River valley. Its distance to Mut is 20 kilometres (12 mi) and to Mersin is 180 kilometres (110 mi).
