= Fakırca, Mut =

Fakırca
- Neighbourhood
- Location in Turkey
- Coordinates: 36°40′N 33°23′E
- Country: Turkey
- Province: Mersin
- District: Mut
- Elevation: 195 m (640 ft)
- Population (2022): 443
- Time zone: UTC+3 (TRT)
- Postal code: 33600
- Area code: 0324

Fakırca is a neighbourhood in the municipality and district of Mut, Mersin Province, Turkey. Its population is 443 (2022). It is situated to the east of Göksu River and to the northwest of Mut. The distance to Mut is 6 kilometres (3.7 mi) and to Mersin is 171 kilometres (106 mi). The main economic activity of the village is agriculture.
