= Palantepe =

- Neighbourhood
- Location in Turkey
- Coordinates: 36°37′1″N 33°26′35″E
- Country: Turkey
- Province: Mersin
- District: Mut
- Elevation: 265 m (869 ft)
- Population (2022): 812
- Time zone: UTC+3 (TRT)
- Postal code: 33600
- Area code: 0324

Palantepe is a neighbourhood in the municipality and district of Mut, Mersin Province, Turkey. Its population is 812 (2022). It is in the wide valley of Göksu River in Toros Mountains. It has almost merged with Mut only 3 kilometres (1.9 mi) away. Distance to Mersin is 158 kilometres (98 mi).
