= Köselerli, Mut =

Köselerli
- Neighbourhood
- Location in Turkey
- Coordinates: 36°33′N 33°27′E
- Country: Turkey
- Province: Mersin
- District: Mut
- Elevation: 100 m (330 ft)
- Population (2022): 701
- Time zone: UTC+3 (TRT)
- Postal code: 33600
- Area code: 0324

Köselerli is a neighbourhood in the municipality and district of Mut, Mersin Province, Turkey. Its population is 701 (2022). It is situated in the Göksu valley and to the west of the Turkish state highway D.715. Its distance to Mut is 11 kilometres (6.8 mi) and to Mersin is 150 kilometres (93 mi). The main economic activities of the village are fruit production and dairying.
