= Mirahor, Mut =

Mirahor
- Neighbourhood
- Location in Turkey
- Coordinates: 36°37′N 33°24′E
- Country: Turkey
- Province: Mersin
- District: Mut
- Elevation: 165 m (541 ft)
- Population (2022): 306
- Time zone: UTC+3 (TRT)
- Postal code: 33600
- Area code: 0324

Mirahor is a neighbourhood in the municipality and district of Mut, Mersin Province, Turkey. Its population is 306 (2022). Mirahor was the chief stable man in the Ottoman Empire and the name of the village probably refers to the grazing land around the village which was once used by the mirahor. It is situated in the Göksu River valley. Its distance to Mut is 5 kilometres (3.1 mi) and to Mersin is 168 kilometres (104 mi).
