= Sertavul Pass =

- Sertavul Geçidi
- Interactive map of Sertavul Pass
- Elevation: 1,660 metres (5,450 ft)
- Traversed by: Route D.715

Third Approach
- Location: Turkey, border of Mersin Province-Karaman Province
- Range: Taurus Mountains
- Coordinates: 36°54′57.6″N 33°16′1.20″E

The Sertavul Pass (Turkish: Sertavul Geçidi) is a mountain pass situated on the central Taurus Mountains at the border of Mersin Province with Karaman Province on the road from Konya over Karaman to the Mediterranean coast at Anamur or Silifke.

The landscape around the pass differs from the other Taurus Mountains' passes due to its relatively flat form. Its character changes as the passage extends further south into the deep valley around Mut north of Mersin Province. While the terrain is mainly treeless and is often with no grass, the plains are covered with cushion plants. The karst landscape is dotted with limestone rocks and riddled with countless sinkholes.

Servatul Pass was the location that Holy Roman Emperor Frederick I Barbarossa crossed the Taurus Mountains on the Third Crusade before he drowned in the River Calycadnus (currently Turkish: Göksu) in 1190.
