= Işıklar, Mut =

Işıklar
- Neighbourhood
- Location in Turkey
- Coordinates: 36°47′N 33°09′E
- Country: Turkey
- Province: Mersin
- District: Mut
- Elevation: 490 m (1,610 ft)
- Population (2022): 539
- Time zone: UTC+3 (TRT)
- Postal code: 33600
- Area code: 0324

Işıklar is a neighbourhood in the municipality and district of Mut, Mersin Province, Turkey. Its population is 539 (2022). It is situated in the Toros Mountains to the west of Göksu River. Its distance to Mut is 55 kilometres (34 mi) and to Mersin is 220 kilometres (140 mi). Main economic activity is agriculture and animal husbandry.
