= Göcekler =

- Neighbourhood
- Location in Turkey
- Coordinates: 36°33′N 33°35′E
- Country: Turkey
- Province: Mersin
- District: Mut
- Elevation: 215 m (705 ft)
- Population (2022): 82
- Time zone: UTC+3 (TRT)
- Postal code: 33600
- Area code: 0324

Göcekler is a neighbourhood in the municipality and district of Mut, Mersin Province, Turkey. Its population is 82 (2022). It is situated to the east of Göksu River valley. Its distance to Mut is 35 kilometres (22 mi) and to Mersin is 140 kilometres (87 mi). Main economic agriculture. Apricot, grapes and olive are the main crops.
