= Bozdoğan, Mut =

Bozdoğan
- Neighbourhood
- Location in Turkey
- Coordinates: 36°41′N 33°13′E
- Country: Turkey
- Province: Mersin
- District: Mut
- Elevation: 670 m (2,200 ft)
- Population (2022): 351
- Time zone: UTC+3 (TRT)
- Postal code: 33600
- Area code: 0324

Bozdoğan is a neighbourhood in the municipality and district of Mut, Mersin Province, Turkey. Its population is 351 (2022). It is at to the west of Göksu River valley. The distance to Mut is 30 kilometres (19 mi) and to Mersin is 195 kilometres (121 mi).
