= Zeytinçukuru =

- Neighbourhood
- Location in Turkey
- Coordinates: 36°35′N 33°20′E
- Country: Turkey
- Province: Mersin
- District: Mut
- Elevation: 155 m (509 ft)
- Population (2022): 104
- Time zone: UTC+3 (TRT)
- Postal code: 33600
- Area code: 0324

Zeytinçukuru is a neighbourhood in the municipality and district of Mut, Mersin Province, Turkey. Its population is 104 (2022). It is situated to the west of Mut on the road to Ermenek. Its distance to Mut is 19 kilometres (12 mi) and to Mersin is 179 kilometres (111 mi).
