= Çampınar, Mut =

Çampınar
- Neighbourhood
- Location in Turkey
- Coordinates: 36°52′N 33°04′E
- Country: Turkey
- Province: Mersin
- District: Mut
- Elevation: 705 m (2,313 ft)
- Population (2022): 244
- Time zone: UTC+3 (TRT)
- Postal code: 33600
- Area code: 0324

Çampınar (formerly Kahdama) is a neighbourhood in the municipality and district of Mut, Mersin Province, Turkey. Its population is 244 (2022). It is to the northwest of Mut. The distance to Mut is 60 kilometres (37 mi) and to Mersin is 225 kilometres (140 mi).
