= Çamlıca, Mut =

Çamlıca
- Neighbourhood
- Location in Turkey
- Coordinates: 36°37′N 33°14′E
- Country: Turkey
- Province: Mersin
- District: Mut
- Elevation: 420 m (1,380 ft)
- Population (2022): 402
- Time zone: UTC+3 (TRT)
- Postal code: 33600
- Area code: 0324

Çamlıca is a neighbourhood in the municipality and district of Mut, Mersin Province, Turkey. Its population is 402 (2022). It is on the road connecting Mut to Ermenek. The distance to Mut is 30 kilometres (19 mi) and to Mersin is 195 kilometres (121 mi).
