= Çivi, Mut =

Çivi
- Neighbourhood
- Location in Turkey
- Coordinates: 36°50′N 33°34′E
- Country: Turkey
- Province: Mersin
- District: Mut
- Elevation: 1,380 m (4,530 ft)
- Population (2022): 339
- Time zone: UTC+3 (TRT)
- Postal code: 33600
- Area code: 0324

Çivi is a neighbourhood in the municipality and district of Mut, Mersin Province, Turkey. Its population is 339 (2022). The village is situated in the Taurus Mountains. The distance to Mut is 60 kilometres (37 mi) and the distance to Mersin is 225 kilometres (140 mi).
