= Çatakbağ, Mut =

Çatakbağ
- Neighbourhood
- Location in Turkey
- Coordinates: 36°40′N 33°11′E
- Country: Turkey
- Province: Mersin
- District: Mut
- Elevation: 650 m (2,130 ft)
- Population (2022): 187
- Time zone: UTC+3 (TRT)
- Postal code: 33600
- Area code: 0324

Çatakbağ is a neighbourhood in the municipality and district of Mut, Mersin Province, Turkey. Its population is 187 (2022). The village is situated in the Taurus Mountains. The distance to Mut is 35 kilometres (22 mi) and to Mersin is 200 kilometres (120 mi).
