= Aydınoğlu, Mut =

Aydınoğlu
- Neighbourhood
- Location in Turkey
- Coordinates: 36°37′N 33°20′E
- Country: Turkey
- Province: Mersin
- District: Mut
- Elevation: 335 m (1,099 ft)
- Population (2022): 384
- Time zone: UTC+3 (TRT)
- Postal code: 33600
- Area code: 0324

Aydınoğlu is a neighbourhood in the municipality and district of Mut, Mersin Province, Turkey. Its population is 384 (2022). It is in the Taurus Mountains to the north of the road connecting Mut to Ermenek. The distance to Mut is 28 kilometres (17 mi) and to Mersin is 190 kilometres (120 mi).
