= Kızılalan, Mut =

Kızılalan
- Neighbourhood
- Location in Turkey
- Coordinates: 36°48′N 33°06′E
- Country: Turkey
- Province: Mersin
- District: Mut
- Elevation: 970 m (3,180 ft)
- Population (2022): 164
- Time zone: UTC+3 (TRT)
- Postal code: 33600
- Area code: 0324

Kızılalan is a neighbourhood in the municipality and district of Mut, Mersin Province, Turkey. Its population is 164 (2022). It is situated in the Taurus Mountains. Its distance to Mut is 60 kilometres (37 mi) and to Mersin is 225 kilometres (140 mi).
