= Güme =

- Neighbourhood
- Location in Turkey
- Coordinates: 36°55′N 33°31′E
- Country: Turkey
- Province: Mersin
- District: Mut
- Elevation: 1,415 m (4,642 ft)
- Population (2022): 189
- Time zone: UTC+3 (TRT)
- Postal code: 33600
- Area code: 0324

Güme is a neighbourhood in the municipality and district of Mut, Mersin Province, Turkey. Its population is 189 (2022). It is situated in Toros Mountains to the north of Mut. It is a high village which is also a yayla (resort) for Mut citizens during the summer. The distance to Mut is 51 kilometres (32 mi) and to Mersin is 211 kilometres (131 mi). The village is an old village and it was founded during the Karamanoğlu beylik era. The main economic activity of the village is animal breeding. Agriculture and beehiving are other activities. Apple is the main agricultural crop.
