= Karadiken, Mut =

Karadiken
- Neighbourhood
- Location in Turkey
- Coordinates: 36°31′N 33°29′E
- Country: Turkey
- Province: Mersin
- District: Mut
- Elevation: 110 m (360 ft)
- Population (2022): 210
- Time zone: UTC+3 (TRT)
- Postal code: 33600
- Area code: 0324

Karadiken is a neighbourhood in the municipality and district of Mut, Mersin Province, Turkey. Its population is 210 (2022). It is situated to the west of the Göksu River to the west of the highway D.715. Its distance to Mut is 15 kilometres (9.3 mi) and to Mersin is 148 kilometres (92 mi).
