= Yeşilyurt, Mut =

Yeşilyurt
- Neighbourhood
- Location in Turkey
- Coordinates: 36°41′N 33°27′E
- Country: Turkey
- Province: Mersin
- District: Mut
- Elevation: 430 m (1,410 ft)
- Population (2022): 245
- Time zone: UTC+3 (TRT)
- Postal code: 33600
- Area code: 0324

Yeşilyurt is a neighbourhood in the municipality and district of Mut, Mersin Province, Turkey. Its population is 245 (2022). It is situated to the north east of Mut. It distance to Mut is 5 kilometres (3.1 mi) and to Mersin is 170 kilometres (110 mi). The village is inhabited by Tahtacı.
