= Demirkapı, Mut =

Demirkapı
- Neighbourhood
- Location in Turkey
- Coordinates: 36°55′N 33°28′E
- Country: Turkey
- Province: Mersin
- District: Mut
- Elevation: 1,450 m (4,760 ft)
- Population (2022): 41
- Time zone: UTC+3 (TRT)
- Postal code: 33600
- Area code: 0324

Demirkapı is a neighbourhood in the municipality and district of Mut, Mersin Province, Turkey. Its population is 41 (2022). It is situated in the high reaches of the Taurus Mountains to the north of Mut. The distance to Mut is 50 kilometres (31 mi) and to Mersin is 215 kilometres (134 mi).
