= Sakız, Mut =

Sakız
- Neighbourhood
- Location in Turkey
- Coordinates: 36°39′N 33°17′E
- Country: Turkey
- Province: Mersin
- District: Mut
- Elevation: 370 m (1,210 ft)
- Population (2022): 999
- Time zone: UTC+3 (TRT)
- Postal code: 33600
- Area code: 0324

Sakız is a neighbourhood in the municipality and district of Mut, Mersin Province, Turkey. Its population is 999 (2022). It is situated to the west of Mut. Distance to Mut is 23 kilometres (14 mi) and to Mersin is 183 kilometres (114 mi). Main crops of the village are olive and apricot. The artificial pond of Sakız, now under planning will solve irrigation problems in farming.
