= Narlıdere, Mut =

Narlıdere
- Neighbourhood
- Location in Turkey
- Coordinates: 36°49′N 33°15′E
- Country: Turkey
- Province: Mersin
- District: Mut
- Elevation: 570 m (1,870 ft)
- Population (2022): 147
- Time zone: UTC+3 (TRT)
- Postal code: 33600
- Area code: 0324

Narlıdere is a neighbourhood in the Mut district of Mersin Province, Turkey. Its population is 147 (2022). It is situated in the Toros Mountains. The distance from Narlıdere to Mut is 12 kilometres (7.5 mi), and to Mersin 177 kilometres (110 mi).

Nearby, approximately 10 kilometres (6 mi) as the crow flies east-southeast from Narlıdere, are the 5th-century ruins of Alahan Monastery.
