= Karacaoğlan, Mut =

Karacaoğlan
- Neighbourhood
- Location in Turkey
- Coordinates: 36°40′N 33°44′E
- Country: Turkey
- Province: Mersin
- District: Mut
- Elevation: 1,110 m (3,640 ft)
- Population (2022): 274
- Time zone: UTC+3 (TRT)
- Postal code: 33600
- Area code: 0324

Karacaoğlan is a neighbourhood in the municipality and district of Mut, Mersin Province, Turkey. Its population is 274 (2022). It is situated in Toros Mountains to the east of Mut and to the south of Sason canyon. It is a rather isolated village; the distance to Mut is 65 kilometres (40 mi) and to Mersin is 225 kilometres (140 mi). The population of the village is composed of Turkmens. The former name of the village was Çukur. But after the tomb of the famous Turkish folk poet Karacaoğlan (1606-1680) was discovered in the village graveyard, it was renamed after Karacaoğlan. Main economic activity of Karacaoğlan is agriculture.
