= Kayaönü, Mut =

Kayaönü
- Neighbourhood
- Location in Turkey
- Coordinates: 36°47′31″N 33°18′4″E
- Country: Turkey
- Province: Mersin
- District: Mut
- Elevation: 800 m (2,600 ft)
- Population (2022): 117
- Time zone: UTC+3 (TRT)
- Postal code: 33600
- Area code: 0324

Kayaönü is a neighbourhood in the municipality and district of Mut, Mersin Province, Turkey. Its population is 117 (2022). It is situated in the Toros Mountains. Its distance to Mut is 26 kilometres (16 mi) and to Mersin is 187 kilometres (116 mi).
