= Pamuklu, Mut =

Pamuklu
- Neighbourhood
- Location in Turkey
- Coordinates: 36°40′N 33°39′E
- Country: Turkey
- Province: Mersin
- District: Mut
- Elevation: 660 m (2,170 ft)
- Population (2022): 115
- Time zone: UTC+3 (TRT)
- Postal code: 33600
- Area code: 0324

Pamuklu is a neighbourhood in the municipality and district of Mut, Mersin Province, Turkey. Its population is 115 (2022). It is situated in the Toros Mountains. Its distance to Mut is 35 kilometres (22 mi) and to Mersin is 155 kilometres (96 mi). Main economic activity is farming and animal husbandry.
