= Çaltılı, Mut =

Çaltılı
- Neighbourhood
- Location in Turkey
- Coordinates: 36°41′N 33°30′E
- Country: Turkey
- Province: Mersin
- District: Mut
- Elevation: 670 m (2,200 ft)
- Population (2022): 149
- Time zone: UTC+3 (TRT)
- Postal code: 33600
- Area code: 0324

Çaltılı is a neighbourhood in the municipality and district of Mut, Mersin Province, Turkey. Its population is 149 (2022). It is to the northeast of the town of Mut. The distance to Mut is 9 kilometres (5.6 mi) and to Mersin is 169 kilometres (105 mi). The village was founded during the Ottoman Empire era. The main economic activity is dairy farming and growing apricots, olives, hickory nuts, pomegranates and figs.
