= Kumaçukuru, Mut =

Kumaçukuru
- Neighbourhood
- Location in Turkey
- Coordinates: 36°40′N 33°22′E
- Country: Turkey
- Province: Mersin
- District: Mut
- Elevation: 800 m (2,600 ft)
- Population (2022): 31
- Time zone: UTC+3 (TRT)
- Postal code: 33600
- Area code: 0324

Kumaçukuru is a neighbourhood in the municipality and district of Mut, Mersin Province, Turkey. Its population is 31 (2022). It is situated in the Toros Mountains. Its distance to Mut is 10 kilometres (6.2 mi) and to Mersin is 173 kilometres (107 mi). The village is inhabited by Tahtacı.
