= Narlı, Mut =

Narlı
- Neighbourhood
- Location in Turkey
- Coordinates: 36°40′N 33°38′E
- Country: Turkey
- Province: Mersin
- District: Mut
- Elevation: 755 m (2,477 ft)
- Population (2022): 211
- Time zone: UTC+3 (TRT)
- Postal code: 33600
- Area code: 0324

Narlı is a neighbourhood in the municipality and district of Mut, Mersin Province, Turkey. Its population is 211 (2022). It is situated in the Toros Mountains. Its distance to Mut is 33 kilometres (21 mi) and to Mersin is 185 kilometres (115 mi).
