= Bağcağız =

- Neighbourhood
- Location within Turkey
- Coordinates: 36°41′N 33°32′E
- Country: Turkey
- Province: Mersin
- District: Mut
- Elevation: 975 m (3,199 ft)
- Population (2022): 162
- Time zone: UTC+3 (TRT)
- Postal code: 33600
- Area code: 0324

Bağcağız is a neighbourhood in the municipality and district of Mut, Mersin Province, Turkey. Its population is 162 (2022). It is to the east of Mut. The distance to Mut is 12 kilometres (7.5 mi) and to Mersin is 172 kilometres (107 mi).

It is an old village: according to Ensar Köse, the earliest document about the village was an Ottoman document of the 16th century which gave the 16th century population of the village as 82. Its main economic activity is farming, producing fruits like apricots and plums. Recently the village was in the news, because of villagers' objection to a planned quarry around the village.
