= Kavaközü, Mut =

Kavaközü
- Neighbourhood
- Location in Turkey
- Coordinates: 36°53′N 33°24′E
- Country: Turkey
- Province: Mersin
- District: Mut
- Elevation: 1,525 m (5,003 ft)
- Population (2022): 83
- Time zone: UTC+3 (TRT)
- Postal code: 33600
- Area code: 0324

Kavaközü is a neighbourhood in the municipality and district of Mut, Mersin Province, Turkey. Its population is 83 (2022). It is situated in the Toros Mountains. Its distance to Mut is 43 kilometres (27 mi) and to Mersin is 203 kilometres (126 mi).
