= Aşağıköselerli =

- Neighbourhood
- Location in Turkey
- Coordinates: 36°30′N 33°30′E
- Country: Turkey
- Province: Mersin
- District: Mut
- Elevation: 170 m (560 ft)
- Population (2022): 814
- Time zone: UTC+3 (TRT)
- Postal code: 33600
- Area code: 0324

Aşağıköselerli is a neighbourhood in the municipality and district of Mut, Mersin Province, Turkey. Its population is 814 (2022). It is close to the south bank of Göksu River. Distance to Mut is 22 kilometres (14 mi) and to Mersin is 165 kilometres (103 mi).

The former name of the village was Kulfalı which is actually the name of the Turkmen tribe which founded the village in the 14th century. Kösreli and Köselerli are the corrupt forms of Kulfalı. They were the subjects of Karamanoğlu Beylik. But eventually the two wings of the village were issued from each other. After 1927. those who settled to the east of the river were called Aşağıköselerli ("lower Kösreli") and those who settled to the south and west of the river were called Yukarıköselerli ("upper Köselerli"). The most important crop of the village is paprika.
