= Çömelek =

- Neighbourhood
- Location in Turkey
- Coordinates: 36°42′N 33°41′E
- Country: Turkey
- Province: Mersin
- District: Mut
- Elevation: 1,180 m (3,870 ft)
- Population (2022): 320
- Time zone: UTC+3 (TRT)
- Postal code: 33600
- Area code: 0324

Çömelek is a neighbourhood in the municipality and district of Mut, Mersin Province, Turkey. Its population is 320 (2022). The village is situated in the Taurus Mountains to the east of Mut. The distance to Mut is 45 kilometres (28 mi) and to Mersin is 165 kilometres (103 mi). Sason canyon is to the south of the village.
