= Evren, Mut =

Evren
- Neighbourhood
- Location in Turkey
- Coordinates: 36°35′N 33°17′E
- Country: Turkey
- Province: Mersin
- District: Mut
- Elevation: 250 m (820 ft)
- Population (2022): 456
- Time zone: UTC+3 (TRT)
- Postal code: 33600
- Area code: 0324

Evren is a neighbourhood in the municipality and district of Mut, Mersin Province, Turkey. Its population is 456 (2022). It is on the road connecting Mut to Ermenek. The distance to Mut is 25 kilometres (16 mi) and to Mersin is 190 kilometres (120 mi).
