= Kayabaşı, Mut =

Kayabaşı
- Neighbourhood
- Location in Turkey
- Coordinates: 36°36′N 33°38′E
- Country: Turkey
- Province: Mersin
- District: Mut
- Elevation: 500 m (1,600 ft)
- Population (2022): 112
- Time zone: UTC+3 (TRT)
- Postal code: 33600
- Area code: 0324

Kayabaşı is a neighbourhood in the municipality and district of Mut, Mersin Province, Turkey. Its population is 112 (2022). It is situated in the Toros Mountains. Its distance to Mut is 42 kilometres (26 mi) and to Mersin is 127 kilometres (79 mi). The village is inhabited by Tahtacı.
