= Dereköy, Mut =

Dereköy
- Neighbourhood
- Location in Turkey
- Coordinates: 36°39′N 33°39′E
- Country: Turkey
- Province: Mersin
- District: Mut
- Elevation: 460 m (1,510 ft)
- Population (2022): 434
- Time zone: UTC+3 (TRT)
- Postal code: 33600
- Area code: 0324

Dereköy is a neighbourhood in the municipality and district of Mut, Mersin Province, Turkey. Its population is 434 (2022). It is situated in the Toros Mountains to the east of Mut. The headwaters of Kurtsuyu creek and the canyon of Sason are close to the village. The distance to Mut is 52 kilometres (32 mi) and to Mersin is 156 kilometres (97 mi). The earliest references about the village are dated from 1500. It was then known as Dereli with a population of only 35. The main economic activity of the village is fruit farming. Fruits like apricot and fig are the main crops.
