= Tuğrul, Mut =

Tuğrul
- Neighbourhood
- Location in Turkey
- Coordinates: 36°32′N 33°33′E
- Country: Turkey
- Province: Mersin
- District: Mut
- Elevation: 155 m (509 ft)
- Population (2022): 116
- Time zone: UTC+3 (TRT)
- Postal code: 33600
- Area code: 0324

Tuğrul is a neighbourhood in the municipality and district of Mut, Mersin Province, Turkey. Its population is 116 (2022). It is situated to the east of Göksu River valley. Its distance to Mut is 25 kilometres (16 mi) and to Mersin is 150 kilometres (93 mi).
