= Yalnızcabağ =

- Neighbourhood
- Location in Turkey
- Coordinates: 36°39′N 33°10′E
- Country: Turkey
- Province: Mersin
- District: Mut
- Elevation: 860 m (2,820 ft)
- Population (2022): 520
- Time zone: UTC+3 (TRT)
- Postal code: 33600
- Area code: 0324

Yalnızcabağ (literally "Lonely orchard") is a neighbourhood in the municipality and district of Mut, Mersin Province, Turkey. Its population is 520 (2022). It is in the Toros Mountains. Distance to Mut was 45 kilometres (28 mi) and to Mersin is 205 kilometres (127 mi). Main crops of the village are pomegranate, apple, grape and pistachio

The tomb of Nure Sofi, the predecessor of Karamanoğlu dynasty is the pasture of in Yalnızcabağ. He died in the 13th century. Three centuries later, in 1687 the borders of his personal territory was certified by the Ottoman authorities. A copy of the certificate is kept by the muhtar of the village.
