= Güzelköy, Mut =

Güzelköy
- Neighbourhood
- Location in Turkey
- Coordinates: 36°31′N 33°22′E
- Country: Turkey
- Province: Mersin
- District: Mut
- Elevation: 370 m (1,210 ft)
- Population (2022): 217
- Time zone: UTC+3 (TRT)
- Postal code: 33600
- Area code: 0324

Güzelköy is a neighbourhood in the municipality and district of Mut, Mersin Province, Turkey. Its population is 217 (2022). It is situated in the west of Göksu River valley. Its distance to Mut is 20 kilometres (12 mi) and to Mersin is 180 kilometres (110 mi). The village economy depends on agriculture.
