= Tekeli, Mut =

Tekeli
- Neighbourhood
- Location in Turkey
- Coordinates: 36°39′N 33°13′E
- Country: Turkey
- Province: Mersin
- District: Mut
- Elevation: 410 m (1,350 ft)
- Population (2022): 194
- Time zone: UTC+3 (TRT)
- Postal code: 33600
- Area code: 0324

Tekeli is a neighbourhood in the municipality and district of Mut, Mersin Province, Turkey. Its population is 194 (2022). It is situated in mountainous area. Its distance to Mut is 35 kilometres (22 mi) and to Mersin is 200 kilometres (120 mi).
