= Kavaklı, Mut =

Kavaklı
- Neighbourhood
- Location in Turkey
- Coordinates: 36°33′N 33°23′E
- Country: Turkey
- Province: Mersin
- District: Mut
- Elevation: 370 m (1,210 ft)
- Population (2022): 405
- Time zone: UTC+3 (TRT)
- Postal code: 33600
- Area code: 0324

Kavaklı is a neighbourhood in the municipality and district of Mut, Mersin Province, Turkey. Its population is 405 (2022). It is situated in the penaplane area to the west of the Göksu River. Its distance to Mut is 19 kilometres (12 mi) and to Mersin is 145 kilometres (90 mi).
