= Suçatı, Mut =

Suçatı
- Neighbourhood
- Location in Turkey
- Coordinates: 36°37′N 33°22′E
- Country: Turkey
- Province: Mersin
- District: Mut
- Elevation: 140 m (460 ft)
- Population (2022): 511
- Time zone: UTC+3 (TRT)
- Postal code: 33600
- Area code: 0324

Suçatı is a neighbourhood in the municipality and district of Mut, Mersin Province, Turkey. Its population is 511 (2022). It is situated to the west of the Göksu River on the highway D-740 which connects Mut to Ermenek. Its distance to Mut is 15 kilometres (9.3 mi) and to Mersin is 180 kilometres (110 mi). Olive production and cattle breeding are the main economic activities of the village.
