= Çınarlı, Mut =

Çınarlı
- Neighbourhood
- Location in Turkey
- Coordinates: 36°37′N 33°38′E
- Country: Turkey
- Province: Mersin
- District: Mut
- Elevation: 410 m (1,350 ft)
- Population (2022): 101
- Time zone: UTC+3 (TRT)
- Postal code: 33600
- Area code: 0324

Çınarlı is a neighbourhood in the municipality and district of Mut, Mersin Province, Turkey. Its population is 101 (2022). It is situated on the Taurus Mountains to the east of Mut. The distance to Mut is 45 kilometres (28 mi) and Mersin 190 kilometres (120 mi).
