= Kürkçü, Mut =

Kürkçü
- Neighbourhood
- Location in Turkey
- Coordinates: 36°34′53″N 33°38′35″E
- Country: Turkey
- Province: Mersin
- District: Mut
- Elevation: 740 m (2,430 ft)
- Population (2022): 324
- Time zone: UTC+3 (TRT)
- Postal code: 33600
- Area code: 0324

Kürkçü (also known as Sarıkavak) is a neighbourhood in the municipality and district of Mut, Mersin Province, Turkey. Its population is 324 (2022). It is 40 kilometres (25 mi) to Mut and 125 kilometres (78 mi) Mersin. Main agricultural product is olive.
