= Barabanlı =

- Neighbourhood
- Location in Turkey
- Coordinates: 36°39′N 33°25′E
- Country: Turkey
- Province: Mersin
- District: Mut
- Elevation: 250 m (820 ft)
- Population (2022): 860
- Time zone: UTC+3 (TRT)
- Postal code: 33600
- Area code: 0324

Barabanlı is a neighbourhood in the municipality and district of Mut, Mersin Province, Turkey. Its population is 860 (2022). It is on the road connecting Mut to Ermenek. The distance to Mut is 5 kilometres (3.1 mi) and to Mersin is 170 kilometres (110 mi). According to the page of the village school the name of the village either refers to a certain Baraban clan or Turkish adverb beraber ("together") referring to Yayla tradition of Mut residents.
