= Elmapınar, Mut =

Elmapınar
- Neighbourhood
- Location in Turkey
- Coordinates: 36°54′N 33°26′E
- Country: Turkey
- Province: Mersin
- District: Mut
- Elevation: 1,435 m (4,708 ft)
- Population (2022): 71
- Time zone: UTC+3 (TRT)
- Postal code: 33600
- Area code: 0324

Elmapınar is a neighbourhood in the municipality and district of Mut, Mersin Province, Turkey. Its population is 71 (2022). It is situated in the high reaches of Toros Mountains. Its distance to Mut is 40 kilometres (25 mi) and to Mersin is 200 kilometres (120 mi). The economic activity of Elmapınar is agriculture. Ovine breeding is another activity.
