= Ballı, Mut =

Ballı
- Neighbourhood
- Location in Turkey
- Coordinates: 36°53′N 33°37′E
- Country: Turkey
- Province: Mersin
- District: Mut
- Elevation: 1,465 m (4,806 ft)
- Population (2022): 332
- Time zone: UTC+3 (TRT)
- Postal code: 33600
- Area code: 0324

Ballı (formerly Eleksi) is a neighbourhood in the municipality and district of Mut, Mersin Province, Turkey. Its population is 332 (2022). It is to the northeast of Mut. The distance to Mut is 50 kilometres (31 mi) and to Mersin is 215 kilometres (134 mi). It is a high altitude and rather secluded village with insufficient farming land. Main economic activity is animal breeding. But cereals and apple are also produced.
