= Çukurbağ, Mut =

Çukurbağ
- Neighbourhood
- Location in Turkey
- Coordinates: 36°41′N 33°36′E
- Country: Turkey
- Province: Mersin
- District: Mut
- Elevation: 1,100 m (3,600 ft)
- Population (2022): 290
- Time zone: UTC+3 (TRT)
- Postal code: 33600
- Area code: 0324

Çukurbağ is a neighbourhood in the municipality and district of Mut, Mersin Province, Turkey. Its population is 290 (2022). The village is situated in the Taurus Mountains to the east of Mut. The distance to Mut is 25 kilometres (16 mi) and to Mersin is 190 kilometres (120 mi).
