= Laal Pasha Mosque =

Mosque in Mersin, Turkey

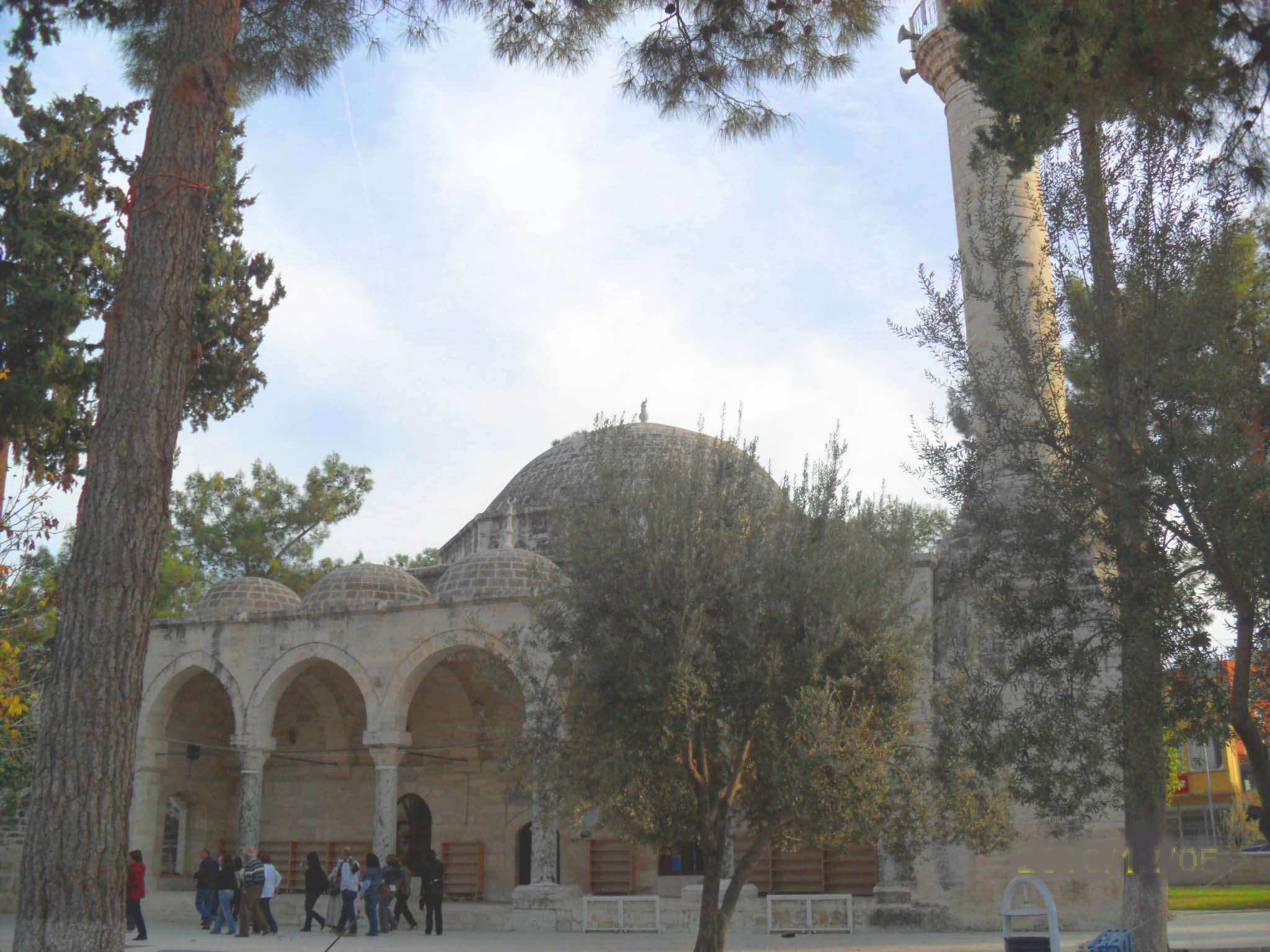

Religion
- Affiliation: Islam
- Province: Mersin Province
- Region: Mediterranean Region
- Rite: Sunni Islam
- Status: Active

Location
- Location: Mersin, Turkey
- Interactive map of Laal Pasha Mosque

Architecture
- Type: Mosque
- Completed: 1444

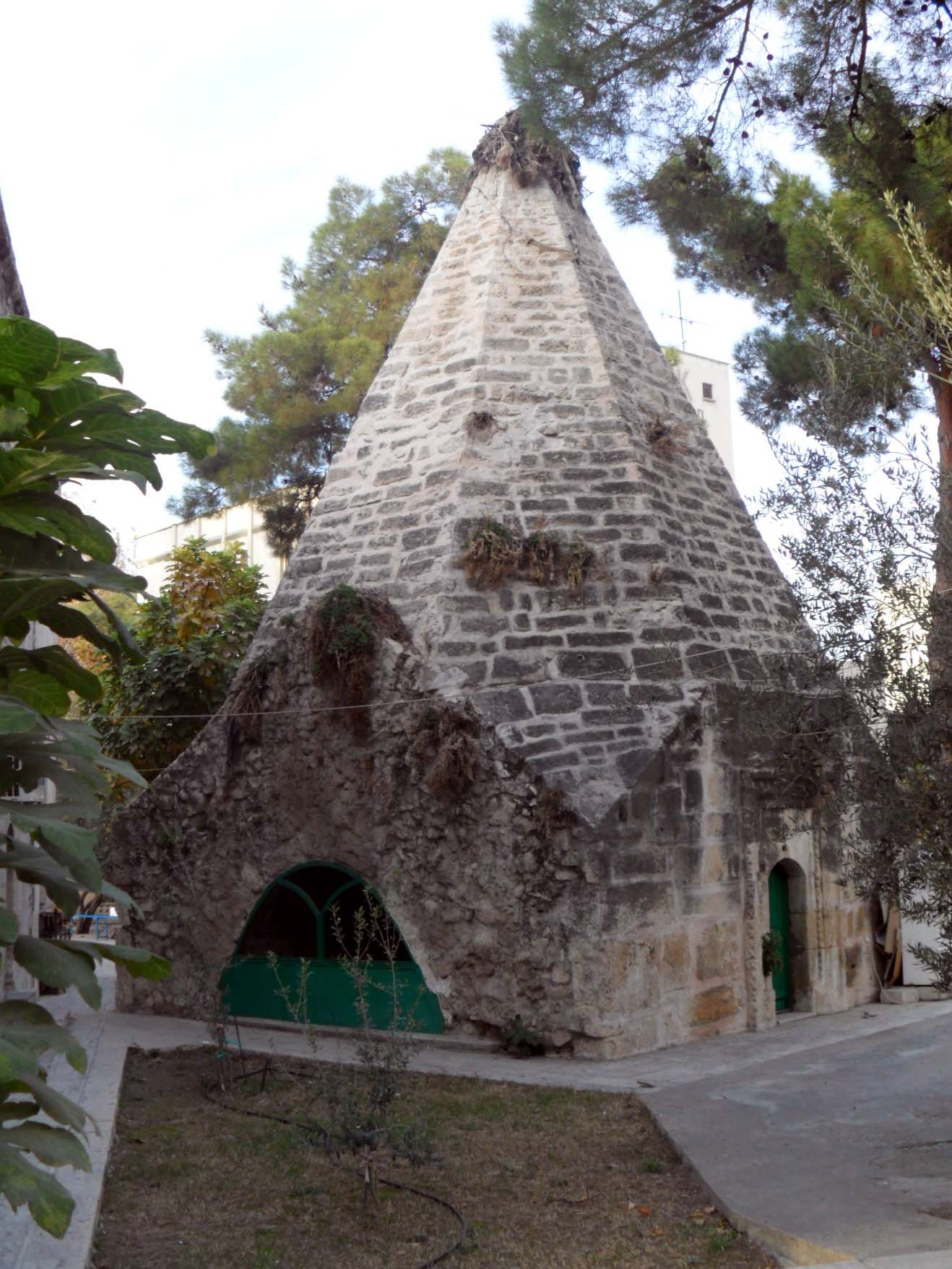
Mausoleum

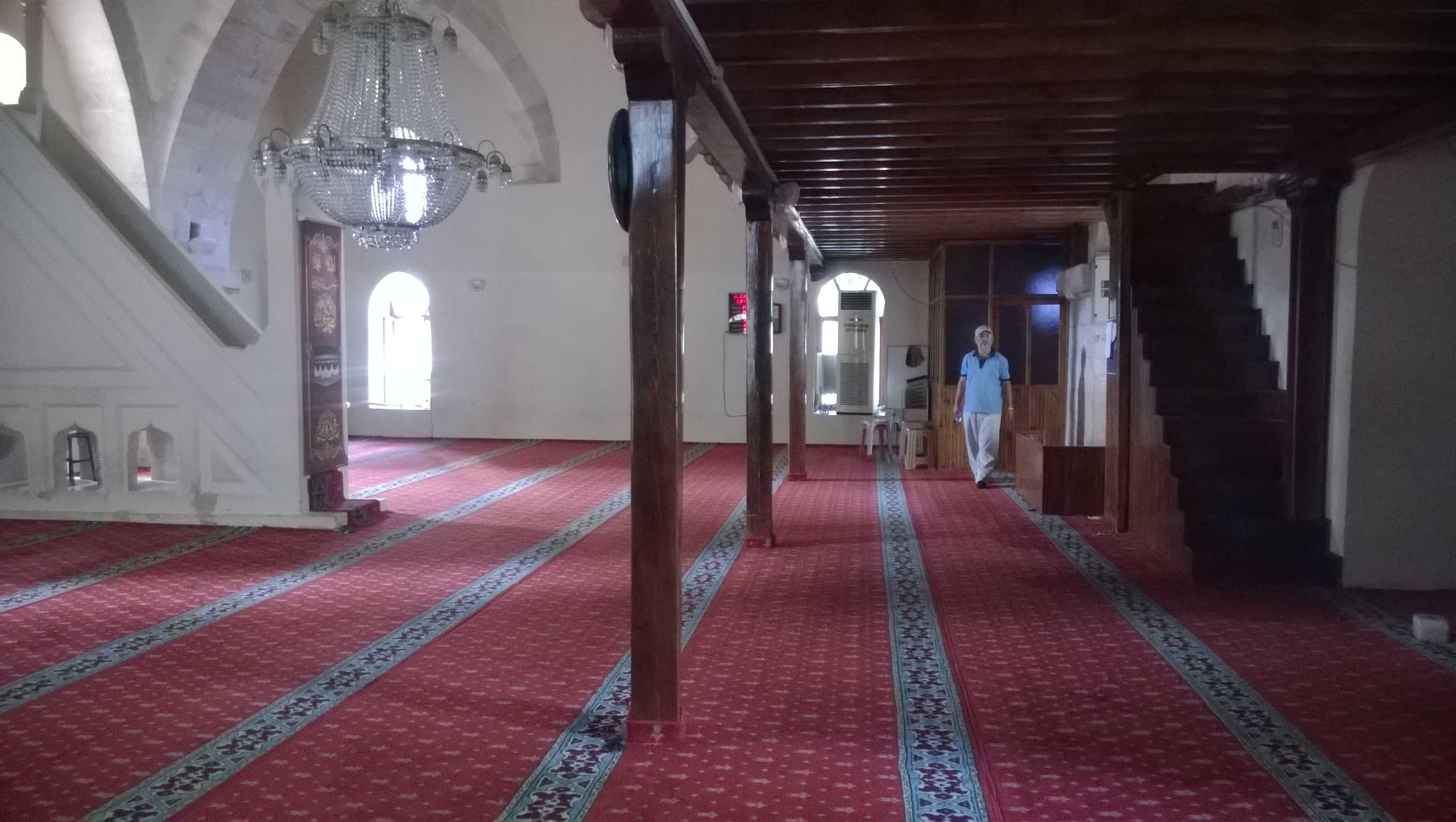
Interior

Laal Pasha Mosque is a Medieval mosque in Mut in Mersin Province, Turkey. (Names such as Lal Pasha, Lael Pasha and Lala Agha are also used.)

== History ==
Laal Pasha was a high-ranking bureaucrat in the Turkmen state of Karamanids in Anatolia. In his youth he was a servant of Alaattin Ali of Karaman. But Alaadin Bey had him trained and he was appointed as the governor of various cities in the realm of Karaman including Niğde and Mut. Laal Pasha Mosque had been constructed by Laal Pasha with the orders of the Ibrahim Bey of Karaman at about 1444. After 1471, all territories of Karaman state were conquered by the Ottoman commander Gedik Ahmed Pasha. During the war, many buildings constructed by Karamanids were demolished. But Laal Pasha Mosque survived. According to the inscriptions of the mosque, there had been two large-scale repairs in the past. The minaret which was completely ruined had been rebuilt as recently as 50 years ago.

== Plan ==
The mosque at 36°38′40″N 33°26′10″E, is in the midtown between a castle and a caravansarai both of which are equally old as the mosque is. The plan of the mosque is square, which would later on be a popular style in Ottoman architecture. There is a big dome, which was constructed of flat face stones. The nartex had been covered by five small domes. In the mosque courtyard, there are two small conical Mausoleums one original and one added by the Ottomans. According to Evliya Çelebi, the 17th century-Turkish travel writer, Laal Pasha's grave is in the first mausoleum.
