= Çukurbağ, Tarsus =

Çukurbağ
- Neighbourhood
- Location in Turkey
- Coordinates: 37°14′N 34°49′E
- Country: Turkey
- Province: Mersin
- District: Tarsus
- Elevation: 1,250 m (4,100 ft)
- Population (2022): 370
- Time zone: UTC+3 (TRT)
- Area code: 0324

Çukurbağ is a village in the municipality and district of Tarsus, Mersin Province, Turkey. Its population is 370 (2022). It is situated in the Taurus Mountains to the east of Turkish motor way O.21. It is located about 45 kilometres (28 mi) away from Tarsus and 72 kilometres (45 mi) away from Mersin.
