= Hacıəhmədli =

- Municipality
- Location within Azerbaijan Location within Karabakh Economic Region
- Coordinates: 40°24′N 47°14′E
- Country: Azerbaijan
- Rayon: Barda

Population
  - Total: 223
- Time zone: UTC+4 (AZT)
  - Summer (DST): UTC+5 (AZT)

Hacıəhmədli (also, Gadzhyakhmedli and Khadzhi-Akhmedli) is a village and municipality in the Barda Rayon of Azerbaijan. It has a population of 223.
