= Çatalharman, Mut =

Çatalharman
- Neighbourhood
- Location in Turkey
- Coordinates: 36°38′N 33°34′E
- Country: Turkey
- Province: Mersin
- District: Mut
- Elevation: 810 m (2,660 ft)
- Population (2022): 221
- Time zone: UTC+3 (TRT)
- Postal code: 33600
- Area code: 0324

Çatalharman is a neighbourhood in the municipality and district of Mut, Mersin Province, Turkey. Its population is 221 (2022). The village is situated in the Taurus Mountains. The distance to Mut is 10 kilometres (6.2 mi) and to Mersin is 170 kilometres (110 mi).
