= Hacıahmetli, Mut =

Hacıahmetli
- Neighbourhood
- Location in Turkey
- Coordinates: 36°40′N 33°35′E
- Country: Turkey
- Province: Mersin
- District: Mut
- Elevation: 1,210 m (3,970 ft)
- Population (2022): 366
- Time zone: UTC+3 (TRT)
- Postal code: 33600
- Area code: 0324

Hacıahmetli is a neighbourhood in the municipality and district of Mut, Mersin Province, Turkey. Its population is 366 (2022). It is about 25 kilometres (16 mi) to Mut. The village is situated in Toros Mountains. The foundation date of the village is not known. According to the Ottoman records of 1536, there was a nomadic Turkmen tribe (so called Yörük) around Hacıahmetli. But according to grave stones, the first settlement was around the early 1700s.
