= Kurtuluş, Mut =

Kurtuluş
- Neighbourhood
- Location in Turkey
- Coordinates: 36°38′N 33°33′E
- Country: Turkey
- Province: Mersin
- District: Mut
- Elevation: 740 m (2,430 ft)
- Population (2022): 130
- Time zone: UTC+3 (TRT)
- Postal code: 33600
- Area code: 0324

Kurtuluş is a neighbourhood in the municipality and district of Mut, Mersin Province, Turkey. Its population is 130 (2022). It is in the Toros Mountains. Its distance to Mut is 15 kilometres (9.3 mi) and to Mersin is 170 kilometres (110 mi). The major economic activity of the village is agriculture. Olive, apricot and figs are the main crops.
