= Mut, Mersin =

Mut
- District and municipality
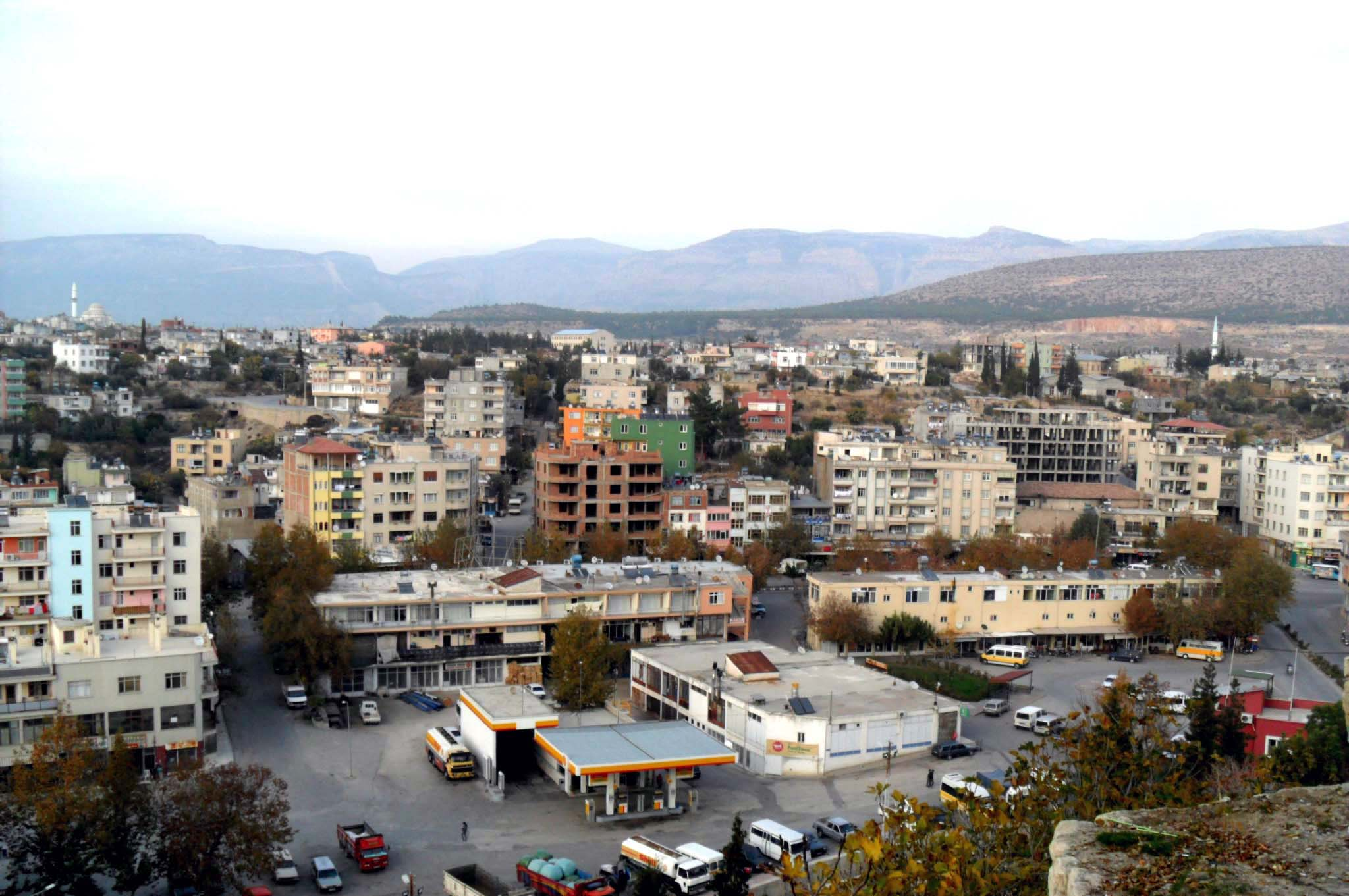
- A view from the west

- Map showing Mut District in Mersin Province

- Location within Turkey
- Coordinates: 36°38′45″N 33°26′15″E
- Country: Turkey
- Province: Mersin

Government
  - Mayor: Murat Orhan (İYİ)
- Area: 2,718 km^{2} (1,049 sq mi)
- Population (2022): 62,874
  - Density: 23.13/km^{2} (59.91/sq mi)
- Time zone: UTC+3 (TRT)
- Postal code: 33600
- Area code: 0324
- Website: mut.bel.tr

Mut is a municipality and district of Mersin Province, Turkey. Its area is 2,718 km^{2}, and its population is 62,874 (2022).

Mut is a rural district at the foot of the Sertavul Pass on the road over the Taurus Mountains from Ankara and Konya to the Mediterranean coast at Anamur or Silifke. Mut is known for its special apricot variety, Mut şekerparesi, and a statue of a girl carrying a basket of them stands at the entrance to the town. The summer is hot and the people of Mut retreat to high meadows (so called yayla) even further up the mountainside. The forests up here are home to wild boar, and the Gezende reservoir on the Ermenek River is a welcome patch of blue in this dry district. The dam has a hydro-electric power station built in Romania.

== History ==
The area has probably been inhabited since the time of the Hittites (2000 BC), and was later part of ancient Cilicia.

=== Roman period ===
Under the Roman Empire, the town was called Claudiopolis. Alahan Monastery, 15 kilometres (9.3 mi) north of Claudiopolis, was started in the second half of the fifth century by the Emperor Leo I and later finish by Emperor Zeno.

=== Middle ages ===
The Romans were succeeded by the Kingdom of Armenia. In the 13th century the Armenians were replaced by the Karamanid clan who founded the state of the same name. The mosque of Lal Pasha, and the Red Minaret (Kızılminare) are among the buildings from the Karamanids that still stand in Mut today.

== Economy ==
Small cattle breeding is one of the important livelihoods of the region.

== Composition ==
There are 102 neighbourhoods in Mut District:

- Alaçam
- Aşağıköselerli
- Aydınoğlu
- Bağcağız
- Ballı
- Barabanlı
- Bozdoğan
- Burunköy
- Çağlayangedik
- Çaltılı
- Çamlıca
- Çampınar
- Çatakbağ
- Çatalharman
- Ceritler
- Çınarlı
- Çivi
- Çömelek
- Çortak
- Çukurbağ
- Cumhuriyet
- Dağpazarı
- Demirkapı
- Dereköy
- Derinçay
- Deveci
- Diştaş
- Doğancı
- Elbeyli
- Elmapınar
- Esençay
- Evren
- Fakırca
- Geçimli
- Gençali
- Göcekler
- Gökçetaş
- Göksu
- Güllük
- Güme
- Güzelköy
- Güzelyurt
- Hacıahmetli
- Hacıilyaslı
- Hacınuhlu
- Hacısait
- Hamamköy
- Haydarköy
- Hisarköy
- Hocalı
- İbrahimli
- Ilıca
- Irmaklı
- Işıklar
- Kadıköy
- Kale
- Karacaoğlan
- Karadiken
- Karşıyaka
- Kavaklı
- Kavaközü
- Kayabaşı
- Kayaönü
- Kelceköy
- Kemenli
- Kırkkavak
- Kışlaköy
- Kızılalan
- Köselerli
- Kültür
- Kumaçukuru
- Kürkçü
- Kurtsuyu
- Kurtuluş
- Meydan
- Mirahor
- Mucuk
- Narlı
- Narlıdere
- Ortaköy
- Özköy
- Özlü
- Palantepe
- Pamuklu
- Pınarbaşı
- Sakız
- Sarıveliler
- Selamlı
- Suçatı
- Tekeli
- Topkaya
- Topluca
- Tuğrul
- Yalnızcabağ
- Yapıntı
- Yatırtaş
- Yazalanı
- Yeşilköy
- Yeşilyurt
- Yıldızköy
- Yukarıköselerli
- Zeytinçukuru

== Climate ==
Mut has a hot semi-arid climate (Köppen: BSh), with very hot, dry summers, and cool, somewhat rainy winters.

Climate data for Mut (1991–2020)
Month	Jan	Feb	Mar	Apr	May	Jun	Jul	Aug	Sep	Oct	Nov	Dec	Year
Mean daily maximum °C (°F)	11.2 (52.2)	13.4 (56.1)	18.0 (64.4)	23.0 (73.4)	28.6 (83.5)	33.7 (92.7)	37.4 (99.3)	37.2 (99.0)	33.1 (91.6)	26.7 (80.1)	18.6 (65.5)	12.7 (54.9)	24.5 (76.1)
Daily mean °C (°F)	6.8 (44.2)	8.4 (47.1)	12.3 (54.1)	16.7 (62.1)	21.9 (71.4)	27.0 (80.6)	30.6 (87.1)	30.4 (86.7)	26.2 (79.2)	20.3 (68.5)	13.0 (55.4)	8.1 (46.6)	18.5 (65.3)
Mean daily minimum °C (°F)	3.2 (37.8)	4.2 (39.6)	7.3 (45.1)	11.0 (51.8)	15.7 (60.3)	20.7 (69.3)	24.1 (75.4)	24.1 (75.4)	19.9 (67.8)	14.7 (58.5)	8.5 (47.3)	4.6 (40.3)	13.2 (55.8)
Average precipitation mm (inches)	67.76 (2.67)	50.76 (2.00)	35.03 (1.38)	21.82 (0.86)	25.78 (1.01)	12.18 (0.48)	0.94 (0.04)	2.73 (0.11)	5.46 (0.21)	20.02 (0.79)	43.28 (1.70)	75.66 (2.98)	361.42 (14.23)
Average precipitation days (≥ 1.0 mm)	6.5	5.5	3.9	3.5	3.8	2.3	1.4	1.1	1.8	3.1	4.1	7.3	44.3
Source: NOAA

== Notable natives ==
- Durmuş Yalçın (politician)
- Mut is one of the places in the area that claims to be the burial place of the folk poet Karacaoğlan.
- Musa Eroğlu (musician, bağlama player) was born in Mut.
- Hüseyin Gezer (sculptor)
- Seyhan Kurt (poet, writer)
- Fikri Sağlar (politician)

One of the last sightings of the Anatolian leopard was near Mut, in the locality called "Dandi" in 2001.
