= State road D.715 (Turkey) =

Highway between Kulu and Silifke in Turkey

D.715

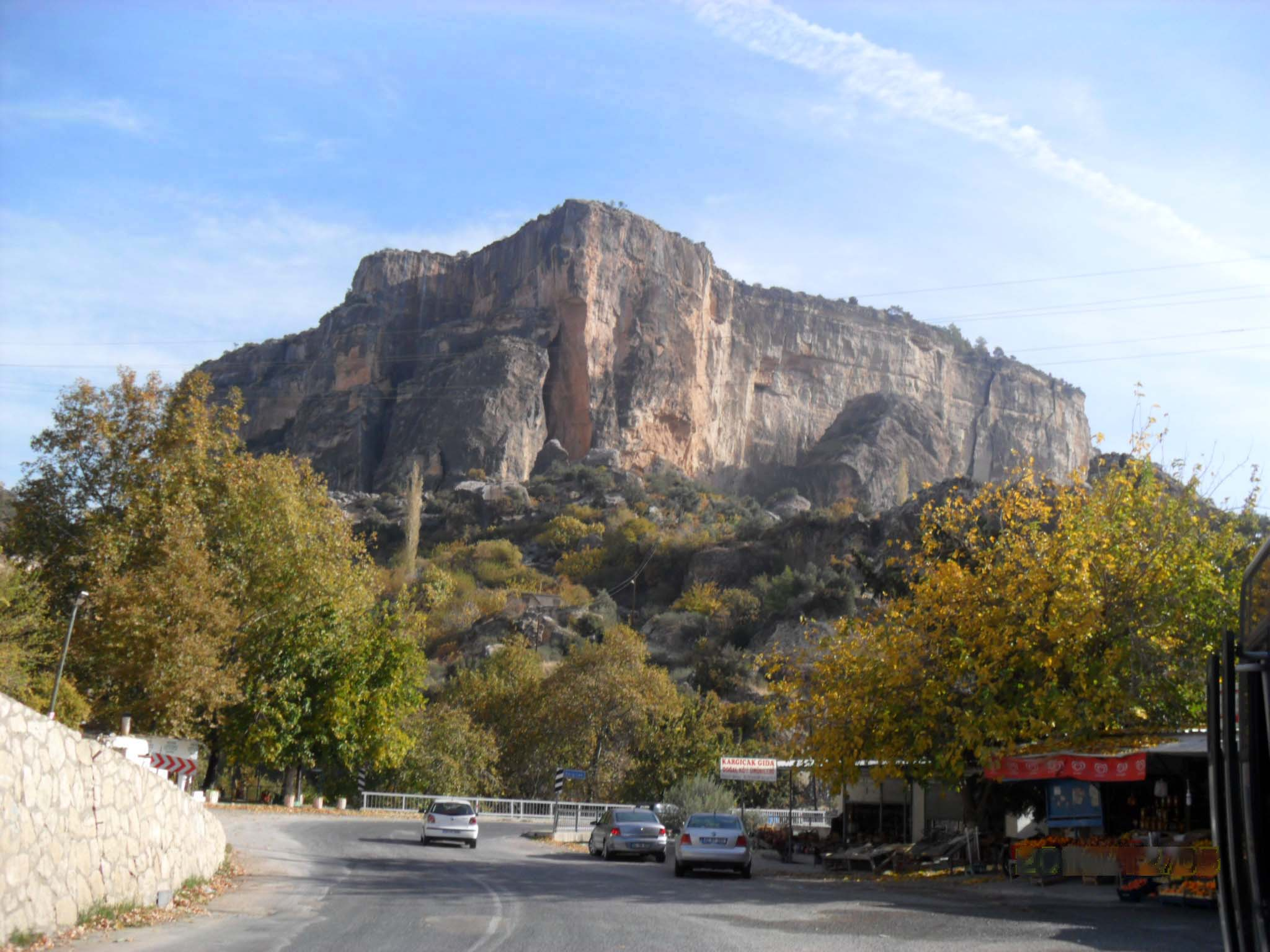

Route information
- Length: 415 km (258 mi)

Major junctions
- North end: Kulu (makas)
- South end: Silifke

Location
- Country: Turkey

Highway system
- Highways in Turkey; Motorways; List; State Highways; List

State road D.715 is a north-to-south state road in Turkey. The northern end of the 415-kilometre (258 mi) road merges with State road D.750 at a location popularly known as Kulu makası (Kulu junction) north of Lake Tuz. The southern end of the road merges with State road D.400 in Silifke. D-715 runs through the provinces of Konya, Karaman and Mersin.

== Itinerary ==
Province	Location	Distance from D750 junction (km)	Distance from D750 junction (mile)	Distance from D400 junction (km)	Distance from D400 junction (mile)
Konya Province
Konya Province	Kulu makası (D750)	0	0	415	258
Konya Province	Kulu	11	7	404	251
Konya Province	Cihanbeyli	66	41	349	217
Konya Province	Konya	167	104	248	154
Konya Province	Çumra .	201	125	214	133
Karaman Province
Karaman Province	Kazımkarabekir	249	155	166	103
Karaman Province	Karaman.	268	167	147	91
Mersin Province	Mut	338	210	77	48
Mersin Province	Silifke (D400)	415	258	0	0

The distance to Ankara from the north junction is 99 kilometres (62 mi) and the distance to Mersin from the south junction is 84 kilometres (52 mi).
