= Göksu =

River in southern Turkey

Göksu River
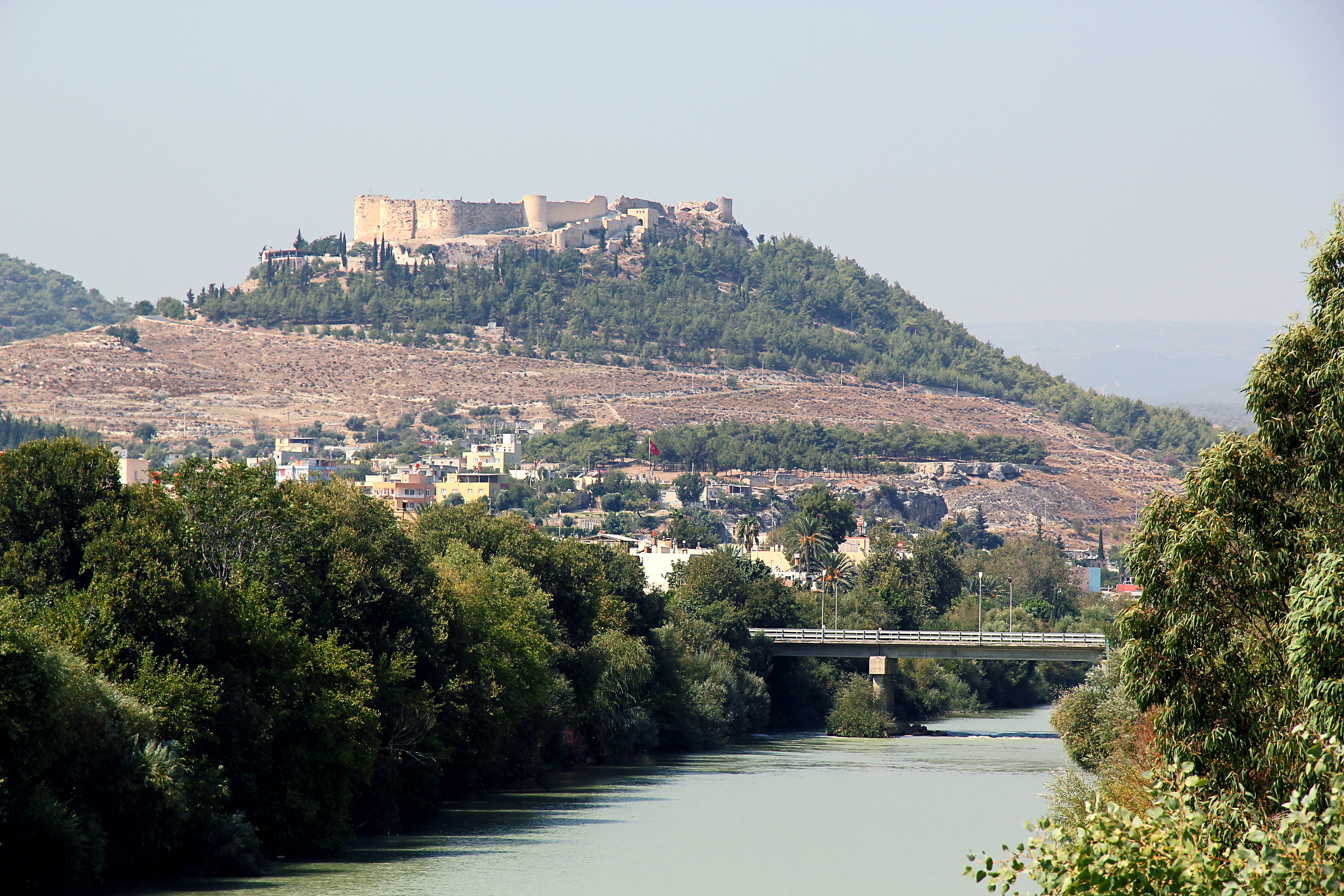
- Göksu River and Silifke Castle

Location
- Country: Turkey

Physical characteristics
- Source
  - location: Taurus Mountains
- Mouth: Göksu Delta
  - location: Mediterranean Sea near Silifke
  - coordinates: 36°17′48″N 34°2′48″E
- Length: 260 km (160 mi)

The Göksu River (Turkish: Göksu Nehri), known in antiquity as the Calycadnus and in the Middle Ages as the Saleph, is a river on the Taşeli Plateau in southern Turkey. Its two sources arise in the Taurus Mountains—the northern in the Geyik Mountains and the southern in the Haydar Mountains—and meet south of Mut. The combined stream then flows south to the Göksu Delta in the Mediterranean Sea near Silifke.

== Names ==
Göksu is Turkish for "Sky(-blue) Water". It is also known as the Geuk Su. It was known to the ancient Greeks as the Kalýkadnos (Καλύκαδνος), Latinized as the Calycadnus, and Kalydnos (Καλυδνός; Calydnus). It was known in the Middle Ages as the Saleph.

== Course ==
The river is 260 km long and empties into the Mediterranean Sea 16 km southeast of Silifke (in Mersin province). The Göksu Delta, including Akgöl Lake and Paradeniz Lagoon, is one of the most important breeding areas in the Near East; over 300 bird species have been observed. Among others, flamingos, herons, bee-eaters, kingfishers, gulls, nightingales and warblers breed here. The endangered loggerhead sea turtle (Caretta caretta) lays eggs here. Another turtle species, Nile softshell turtle also nests along the Göksu beaches.

Due to demand for summer vacation apartments by the locals, and since necessary precautions are not taken and public attention is minimal in this part of Turkey, the ecosystem around Akgöl Lake and Paradeniz Lagoon is in heavy danger.

== History ==
=== Iron Age ===
The Ionian Greek colony of Holmi was founded near the mouth of the Calycadnus but suffered from piracy and raiders.

=== Classical Age ===
Seleucia, the modern Silifke, was founded at a more defensible position a little further up the river by Seleucus I Nicator and was an important regional center for centuries, particularly noted as a center of early Christianity. The Romans bridged the river at Seleucia in 77 AD.

=== Middle Ages ===
==== Third Crusade ====
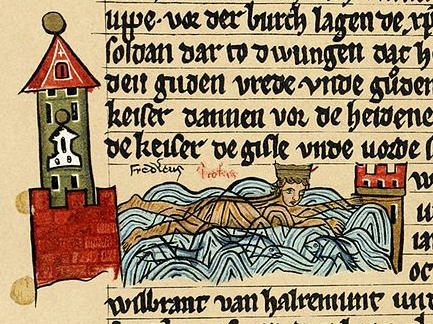
Barbarossa drowns in the Saleph, Sächsische Weltchronik (c. 1280)

In 1190, while on the Third Crusade, Emperor Frederick Barbarossa drowned in the river, then known as the Saleph and located within the Armenian Kingdom of Cilicia. The crusaders had reached Asia Minor in March, where the emperor continued his campaign to the Holy Land. Having plundered the city of Konya and defeated the forces of the Sultanate of Rum at the Battle of Iconium, his forces arrived on the banks of the river on June 10. Several contradictory statements reflect the circumstances of his sudden death, which have not been conclusively established. According to some sources, the emperor was lost in the current when he tried to cross the water near Silifke; other chronicles report he wished to cool down from the heat of the day and suffered a heart attack while taking a bath. The mortal remains were preserved according to the Mos Teutonicus process and transferred to Tarsus, Antioch and Tyre by his followers. Once without a leader, his crusader army dispersed; the remnants later joined the Siege of Acre. A monument in Barbarossa's honor was erected on the road from Silifke to Mut.

== See also ==
- Ermenek Dam
- Blue Tunnel Project
- Frederick Barbarossa Memorial
