= Hançerkale =

Köy in Mudanya, Turkey

Coordinates: 36°31′N 33°59′E

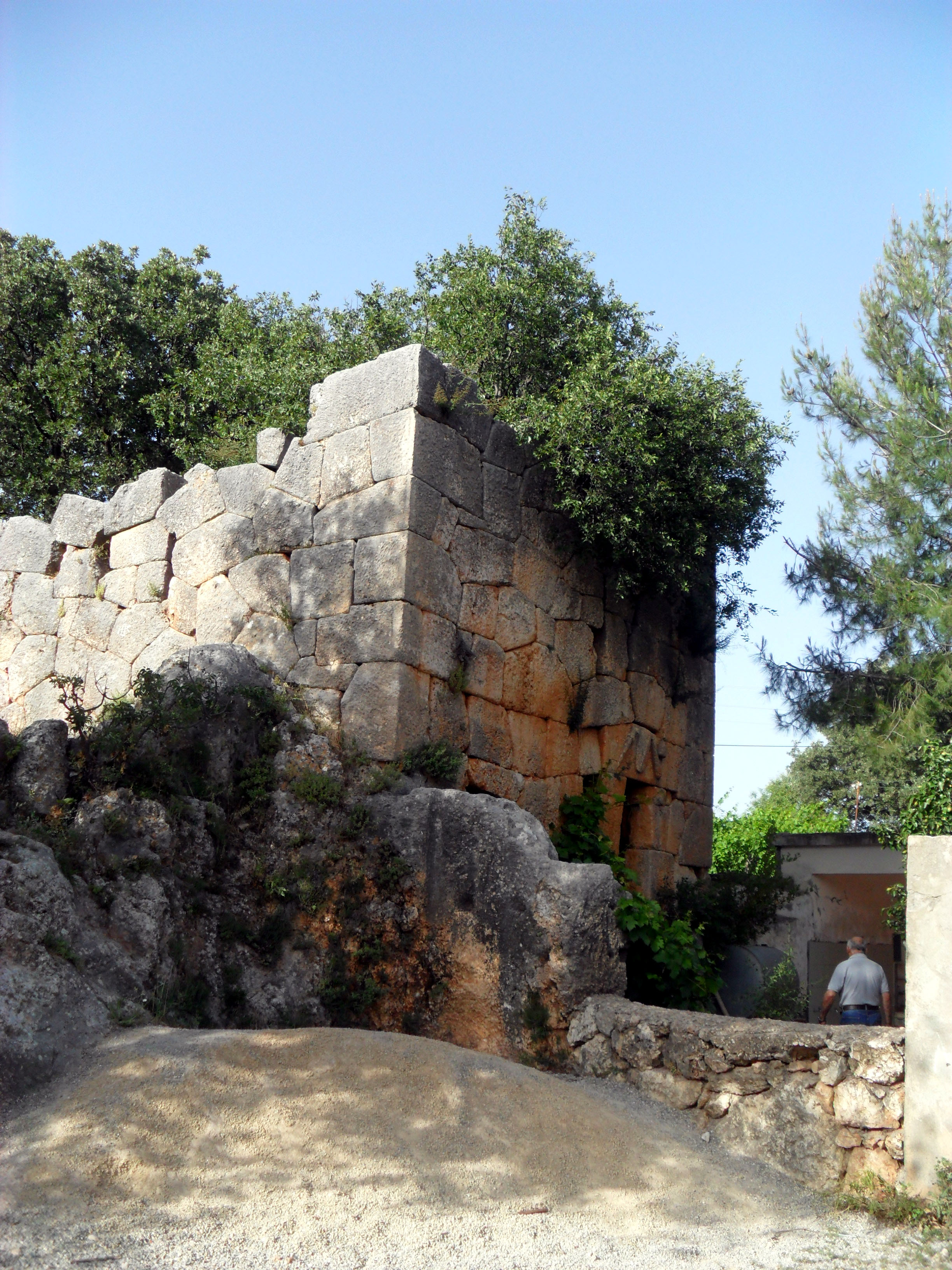

Hançerkale (literally "dagger castle") is the popular name given to a Byzantine observation tower ruin in Mersin Province, Turkey.

== Geography ==
The tower is situated next to a mosque, in Ovacık village of Silifke district. It is 12 kilometres (7.5 mi) north of the Turkish state highway D.400. It is accessible by an all-seasons open road. Its distance to Silifke is 17 kilometres (11 mi) and to Mersin is 97 kilometres (60 mi)

== Building ==
Although the popular name of the ruin is castle, actually it was a 5.3 metres (17 ft)-tall observation tower built in the 6th century. The walls had been built by polygonal masonry technique. There are reliefs of a Dioskuri helmet, a shield, a sword and Herculus' Club on the southern wall.
