= Pseudokorasion =

Town of ancient Cilicia

Coordinates: 36°23′20″N 34°04′20″E

Pseudokorasion was a town of ancient Cilicia, on the coast a little to the east of Seleucia ad Calycadnum, inhabited during the Hellenistic, Roman and Byzantine eras.

Its site is tentatively located near Devle Çiftliği in Asiatic Turkey.
