= Kocapınar, Silifke =

Kocapınar
- Neighbourhood
- Location in Turkey
- Coordinates: 36°20′N 33°50′E
- Country: Turkey
- Province: Mersin
- District: Silifke
- Elevation: 150 m (490 ft)
- Population (2022): 143
- Time zone: UTC+3 (TRT)
- Postal code: 33940
- Area code: 0324

Kocapınar is a neighbourhood in the municipality and district of Silifke, Mersin Province, Turkey. Its population is 143 (2022). It is situated on the southern slopes of the Taurus Mountains, to the northwest of Taşucu. Its distance to Silifke is 15 kilometres (9.3 mi) and to Mersin is 100 kilometres (62 mi). The main economic activity is farming.
