= Sabak =

Sabak may refer to:

- Paolo Sabak (born 1999), Belgian footballer
- Sabak, Selangor, principal town of Sabak Bernam district in the state of Selangor, Malaysia
- Sabak, Silifke, a village in the district of Silifke, Mersin Province, Turkey
- Sabak (film), a Hindi film of 1973
- Sabak (1950 film)
