= Gökbelen =

- Neighbourhood
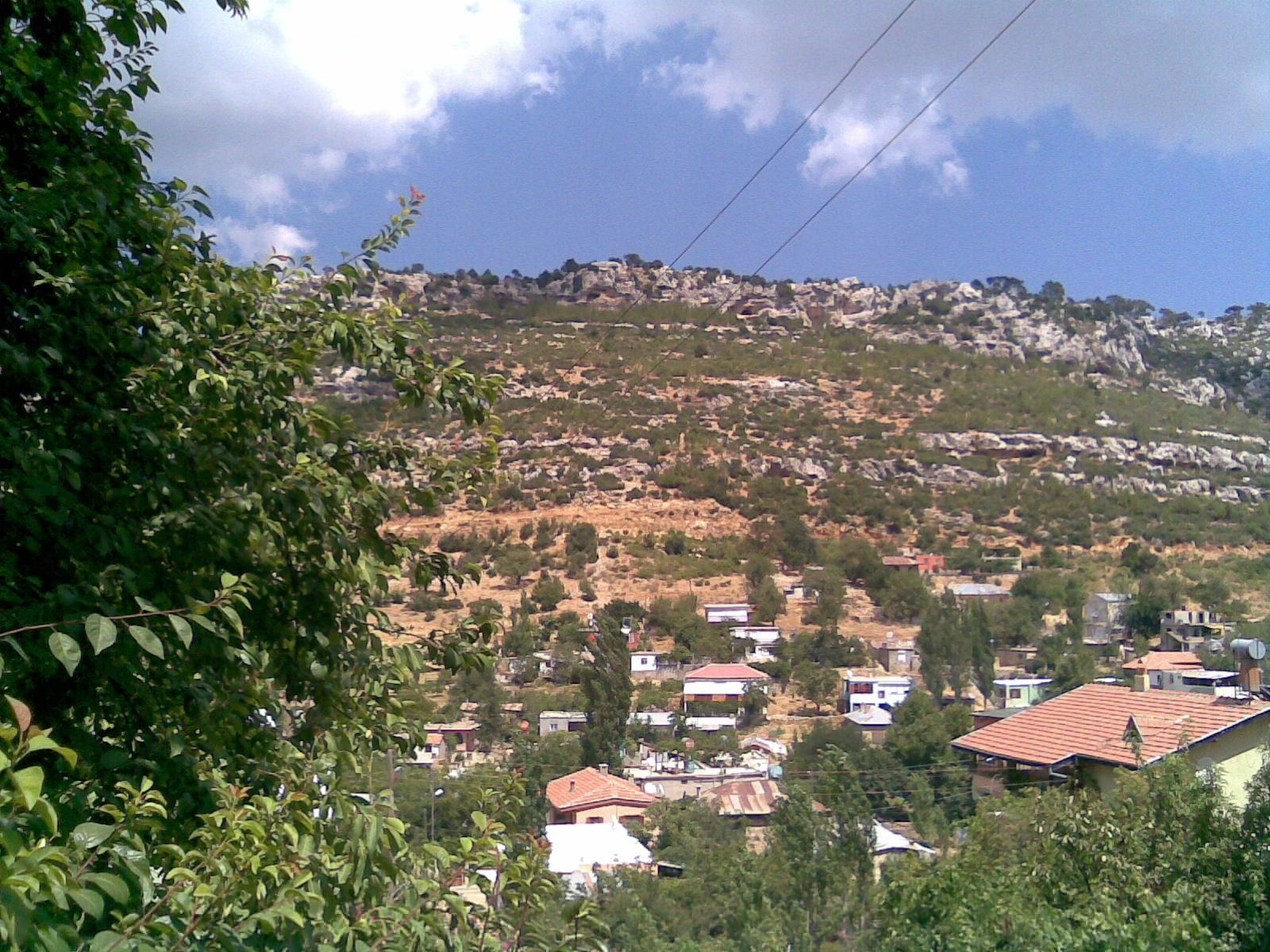

- Location within Turkey
- Coordinates: 36°20′35″N 33°38′56″E
- Country: Turkey
- Province: Mersin
- District: Silifke
- Elevation: 968 m (3,176 ft)
- Population (2022): 181
- Time zone: UTC+3 (TRT)
- Postal code: 33940
- Area code: 0324

Gökbelen is a neighbourhood in the municipality and district of Silifke, Mersin Province, Turkey. Its population is 181 (2022). Its distance to Silifke is 28 kilometres (17 mi) and to Mersin is 123 kilometres (76 mi). In summers the population increases for the village is used as a summer resort by some Silifke and Taşucu residents (see Yayla).

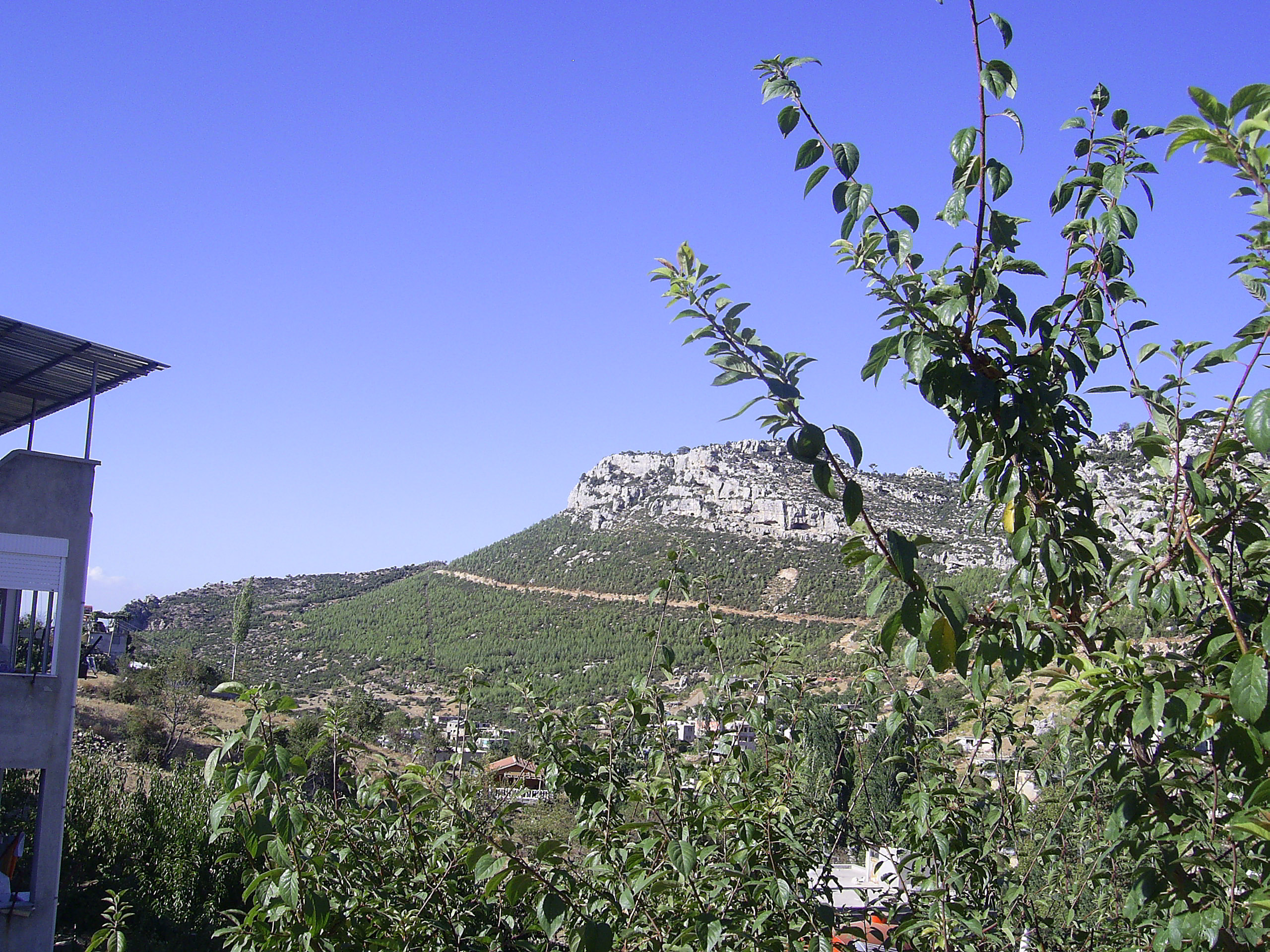
Gökbelen
