= Öztürkmenli =

- Neighbourhood
- Location in Turkey
- Coordinates: 36°28′N 34°01′E
- Country: Turkey
- Province: Mersin
- District: Silifke
- Elevation: 510 m (1,670 ft)
- Population (2022): 80
- Time zone: UTC+3 (TRT)
- Postal code: 33940
- Area code: 0324

Öztürkmenli is a neighbourhood in the municipality and district of Silifke, Mersin Province, Turkey. Its population is 80 (2022). The village is situated in the southern slopes of Toros Mountains to the east of Yenibahçe. The distance to Silifke is 28 kilometres (17 mi) and to Mersin is 88 kilometres (55 mi). Mezgitkale, a Roman mausoleum is to the south east of the village.
