= Tekir =

Tekir may refer to:

- Erdinç Tekir (born 1966), Turkish member of the IHH
- Tekir, located at the ancient settlement of Knidos
- Tekir ambarı, large cistern in Silifke district of Mersin Province, Turkey
