= Holmia =

Holmia may refer to:

- Holmia (Cilicia), a town of ancient Cilicia, now in Turkey
- Holmia, the Latin name of Stockholm
- Holmia, a residential area in the centre of Stockholm, on the island Kungsholmen
- Holmia, the vernacular name of Holmium(III) oxide
- 378 Holmia, an asteroid
- Holmia (trilobite), a trilobite belonging to the Olenellina suborder
- Holmia, a taxonomic synonym for a genus of sedges, Carex
