= Mezgitkale =

Mausoleum in Turkey

- Korkusuz kral mezarı (Mausoleum of fearless king)
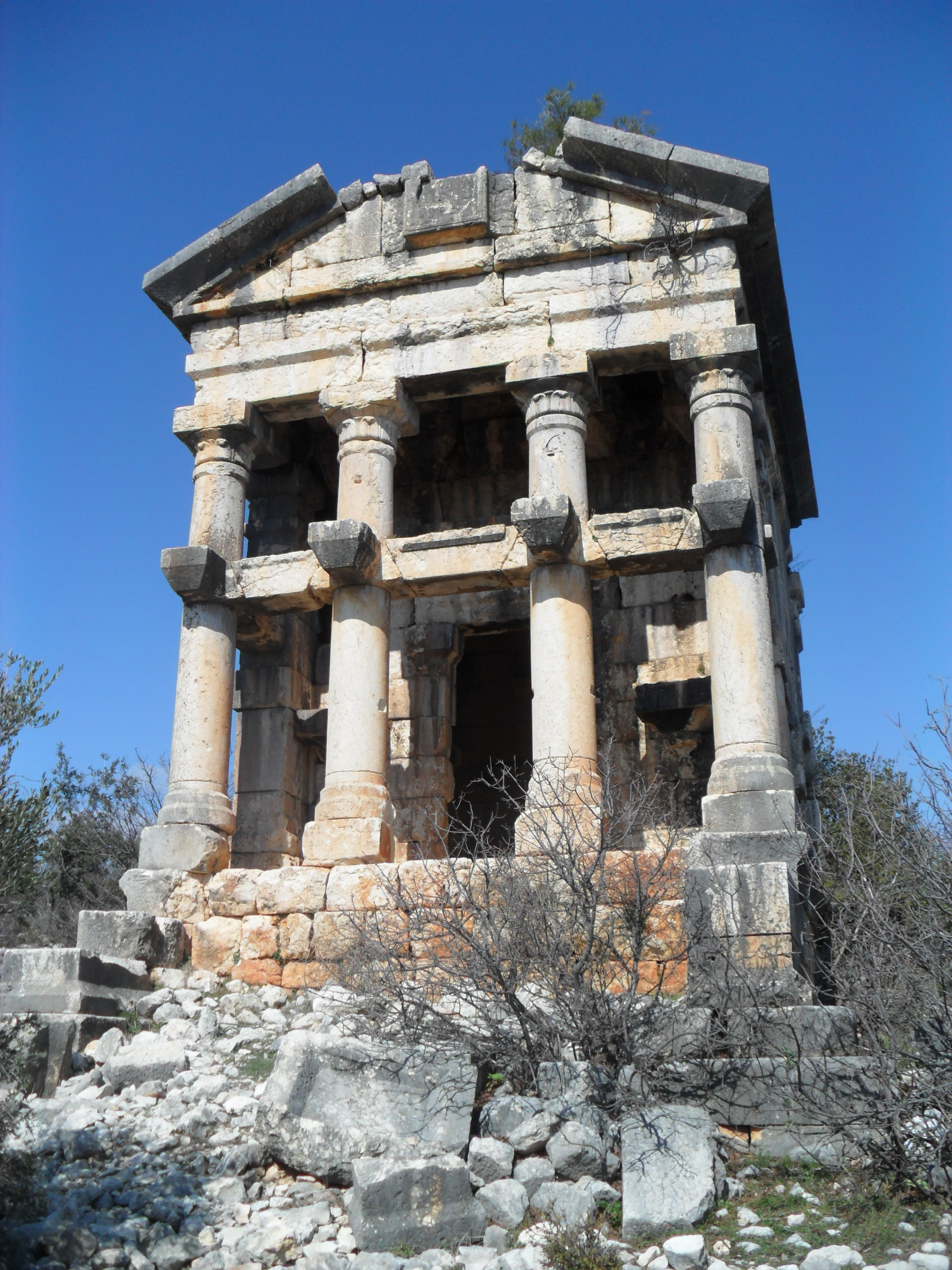

- Location within Turkey
- 36°28′2″N 34°1′37″E
- Type: Mausoleum
- Location: Mersin Province, Turkey
- Region: Cilicia Trachea

Site notes
- Condition: Intact

Mezgitkale is a 2nd- or 3rd-century mausoleum in Mersin Province of Turkey.

== Geography ==
Mezgitkale (also known as Korkusuz Kral Mezarı “Mausoleum of fearless king” ) is a small mousoleum near Öztürkmenli village in Silifke district. It is situated in the 500 metres (1,600 ft) high plateau to the south of Toros Mountains. It is accessible from Atakent on the Mediterranean shore. Distance to Silifke is 27 kilometres (17 mi) and to Mersin is 80 kilometres (50 mi)

== History ==
Although the Turkish suffix -kale means fort, this building is actually a mausoleum. Also, contrary to popular belief it is not a mausoleum of a king. It was built by an eminent Roman citizen (probably a land owner) for his family. The building was used as a tomb for about two centuries. Then it was abandoned during the Byzantine era. During Ottoman era, the building was used as a house and a furnace was added to the original building.

== Technical details ==
The dimensions of the square building are 7.8 x 7.8 m^{2} (25.6 x 25.6 ft^{2}). The entrance with four Corinth type columns and corbels is at the south. On the north wall there are reliefs of a shield, a sword and two scorpions. On the west wall there is a relief (now partially damaged) of a phallus probably dedicated to Priapos. Next to the moselaum, there is a stone carved cistern with dimensions 5 x 20 x 8 m^{3} ( 16.4 x 65 x 26 ft^{3}). According to Ministry of Culture and Tourism, there was also an olive oil workshop.
