= Bolacalıkoyuncu =

- Neighbourhood
- Location within Turkey
- Coordinates: 36°20′13″N 33°54′11″E
- Country: Turkey
- Province: Mersin
- District: Silifke
- Elevation: 40 m (130 ft)
- Population (2022): 971
- Time zone: UTC+3 (TRT)
- Postal code: 33940
- Area code: 0324

Bolacalıkoyuncu is a neighbourhood in the municipality and district of Silifke, Mersin Province, Turkey. Its population is 971 (2022). The village is situated on the state highway D.400. It is almost merged with Taşucu a town to the west. The distance to Silifke is 6 kilometres (3.7 mi) and to Mersin is 91 kilometres (57 mi). The name of the village is composed of two words. Bolacalı refers to a cross bred goat (Boer goat and a local breed from Van) and koyuncu means sheepman. But the village economy depends mostly on fruit and vegetable farming.
