= Sökün, Silifke =

Sökün
- Neighbourhood
- Location in Turkey
- Coordinates: 36°21′N 34°01′E
- Country: Turkey
- Province: Mersin
- District: Silifke
- Elevation: 3 m (9.8 ft)
- Population (2022): 517
- Time zone: UTC+3 (TRT)
- Postal code: 33940
- Area code: 0324

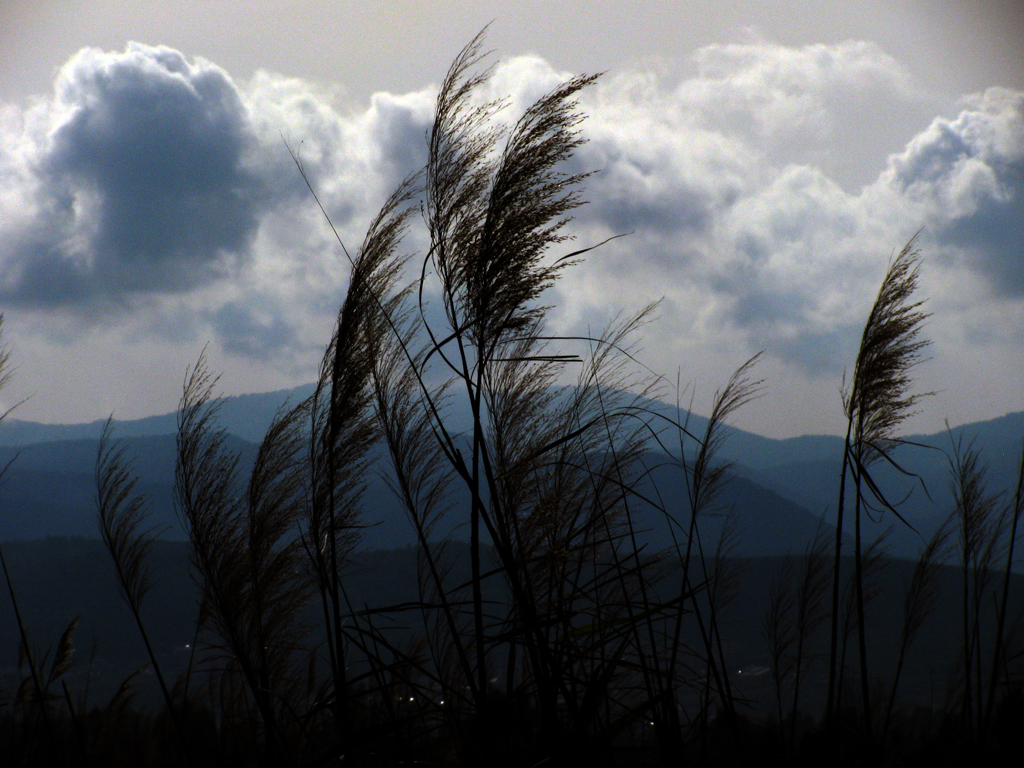

Sökün is a neighbourhood in the municipality and district of Silifke, Mersin Province, Turkey. Its population is 517 (2022). It is situated in the Göksu Delta. It is almost merged to Kurtuluş another village to the southwest of Sökün. The distance to Silifke is 8 kilometres (5.0 mi) and to Mersin is 86 kilometres (53 mi). The main economic activity is farming. The area around the village is fertile. But being a low altitude village, in some years the village suffers flood damage. Almost all crops native to Mediterranean are produced. But strawberry is the most pronounced crop.
