= Güvercin Islet =

Small Turkish Island in the Mediterranean sea

Native name: Güvercin Adası
- Location within Turkey

Geography
- Location: Mediterranean Sea
- Coordinates: 36°14′38″N 33°48′38″E

Administration
- Turkey
- İl (province): Mersin Province
- İlçe: Silifke

Güvercin Islet ("Pigeon Islet") is a Mediterranean islet of Turkey. It is a part of Silifke ilçe (district) of Mersin Province. It is at 36°14′38″N 33°48′38″E and situated about 200 metres (660 ft) to main land. The islet is quite small; only 3,000 square metres (32,000 sq ft). There are ruins of late Roman Empire era in this otherwise unnotable island. The ruins are in the north east side of the island . The ruins probably belonged to a mansion. The construction material is rectangular stone. There are tombs, ceramics and a part of a mosaic floor in the island.
