= Cılbayır, Silifke =

Cılbayır
- Neighbourhood
- Location in Turkey
- Coordinates: 36°21′N 33°57′E
- Country: Turkey
- Province: Mersin
- District: Silifke
- Elevation: 910 m (2,990 ft)
- Population (2022): 130
- Time zone: UTC+3 (TRT)
- Postal code: 33940
- Area code: 0324

Cılbayır is a neighbourhood in the municipality and district of Silifke, Mersin Province, Turkey. Its population is 130 (2022). It is situated in Taurus Mountains to the west of Göksu River valley. Its distance to Silifke is 35 kilometres (22 mi) and to Mersin is 120 kilometres (75 mi).
