= Ayaştürkmenli =

- Neighbourhood
- Location in Turkey
- Coordinates: 36°45′N 33°53′E
- Country: Turkey
- Province: Mersin
- District: Silifke
- Elevation: 1,560 m (5,120 ft)
- Population (2022): 81
- Time zone: UTC+3 (TRT)
- Postal code: 33940
- Area code: 0324

Ayaştürkmenli is a neighbourhood in the municipality and district of Silifke, Mersin Province, Turkey. Its population is 81 (2022). It is situated in the Taurus Mountains to the west of Limonlu Creek, (Lamos Creek of the antiquity). The distance to Silifke is 50 kilometres (31 mi). It is a very small settlement, but it still keeps its legal entity as a village.
