= Çamlıca, Silifke =

Çamlıca
- Neighbourhood
- Location in Turkey
- Coordinates: 36°20′N 33°42′E
- Country: Turkey
- Province: Mersin
- District: Silifke
- Elevation: 1,000 m (3,300 ft)
- Population (2022): 237
- Time zone: UTC+3 (TRT)
- Postal code: 33940
- Area code: 0324

Çamlıca is a neighbourhood in the municipality and district of Silifke, Mersin Province, Turkey. Its population is 237 (2022). The village is situated in the Taurus Mountains and on the road connecting Silifke to Gülnar. The distance to Silifke is 25 kilometres (16 mi) and to Mersin is 110 kilometres (68 mi).
