= Holmi =

Greek harbor town of Cilicia

Coordinates: 36°19′13″N 33°52′51″E

Holmi or Holmoi (Ancient Greek: Ὅλμοι), or Holmia, also possibly called Hermia, was a Greek town of Cilicia Tracheia with a harbor, a little to the south-west of Seleucia ad Calycadnum. When Seleucia ad Calycadnum was founded, the inhabitants of Holmi migrated there.

Its site is located near Taşucu in Asiatic Turkey.
