= Karakaya, Silifke =

Karakaya
- Neighbourhood
- Location in Turkey
- Coordinates: 36°25′N 33°47′E
- Country: Turkey
- Province: Mersin
- District: Silifke
- Elevation: 50 m (160 ft)
- Population (2022): 234
- Time zone: UTC+3 (TRT)
- Postal code: 33940
- Area code: 0324

Karakaya is a neighbourhood in the municipality and district of Silifke, Mersin Province, Turkey. Its population is 234 (2022). It is situated to the west of Göksu River valley. Distance to Silifke is 15 kilometres (9.3 mi) and to Mersin is 90 kilometres (56 mi). The main economic activity is agriculture; the village produces various fruits like plum and pomegranate.
