= Bükdeğirmeni, Silifke =

Bükdeğirmeni
- Neighbourhood
- Location in Turkey
- Coordinates: 36°26′N 33°54′E
- Country: Turkey
- Province: Mersin
- District: Silifke
- Elevation: 90 m (300 ft)
- Population (2022): 295
- Time zone: UTC+3 (TRT)
- Postal code: 33940
- Area code: 0324

Bükdeğirmeni is a neighbourhood in the municipality and district of Silifke, Mersin Province, Turkey. Its population is 295 (2022). It is situated to the east of Göksu River. The distance to Silifke is 10 kilometres (6.2 mi) and to Mersin is 95 kilometres (59 mi). The population is composed of two different stocks. The ancestors of most people are from the now-abandoned nearby village of Multay and they may be of Mongol origin from the 14th century. The ancestors of the second group are animal breeders from Anamur. Major economic activities are farming and animal breeding.
