= Xenarchus of Seleucia =

1st century BC Greek Peripatetic philosopher and grammarian

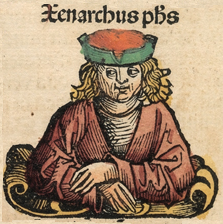
Xenarchus, depicted as a medieval scholar in the Nuremberg Chronicle.

Xenarchus (Greek: Ξέναρχος; 1st century BC) of Seleucia in Cilicia, was a Greek Peripatetic philosopher and grammarian. Xenarchus left home early, and devoted himself to the profession of teaching, first at Alexandria, afterwards at Athens, and last at Rome, where he enjoyed the friendship of Arius, and afterwards of Augustus; and he was still living, in old age and honour, when Strabo wrote. Xenarchus disagreed with Aristotle on many issues. He denied the existence of the aether, composing a treatise entitled Against the Fifth Element. He is also mentioned by Simplicius, by Julian the Apostate, and by Alexander of Aphrodisias.

== Bibliography ==
- Andrea Falcon, Aristotelianism in First Century. Xenarchus of Seleucia, Cambridge, Cambridge University Press, 2011.
