= Kepez, Silifke =

Kepez
- Neighbourhood
- Location in Turkey
- Coordinates: 36°30′N 33°46′E
- Country: Turkey
- Province: Mersin
- District: Silifke
- Elevation: 1,175 m (3,855 ft)
- Population (2022): 93
- Time zone: UTC+3 (TRT)
- Postal code: 33940
- Area code: 0324

Kepez is a neighbourhood in the municipality and district of Silifke, Mersin Province, Turkey. Its population is 93 (2022). It is situated in Taurus Mountains. It is 35 kilometres (22 mi) from the central town of Silifke and 120 kilometres (75 mi) from Mersin. The main economic activities are farming and animal husbandry.
