= İmambekirli, Silifke =

İmambekirli
- Neighbourhood
- Location in Turkey
- Coordinates: 36°26′N 33°38′E
- Country: Turkey
- Province: Mersin
- District: Silifke
- Elevation: 255 m (837 ft)
- Population (2022): 334
- Time zone: UTC+3 (TRT)
- Postal code: 33940
- Area code: 0324

İmambekirli is a neighbourhood in the municipality and district of Silifke, Mersin Province, Turkey. Its population is 334 (2022). It is situated on Taurus Mountains to the west of Göksu River valley. Distance to Silifke is 41 kilometres (25 mi) and to Mersin is 127 kilometres (79 mi). Main economic activities are agriculture and animal breeding. Main crops are olive, apricot, plum, figs, and pistachio.
