= Pelitpınarı, Silifke =

Pelitpınarı
- Neighbourhood
- Location in Turkey
- Coordinates: 36°23′N 33°35′E
- Country: Turkey
- Province: Mersin
- District: Silifke
- Elevation: 910 m (2,990 ft)
- Population (2022): 197
- Time zone: UTC+3 (TRT)
- Postal code: 33940
- Area code: 0324

Pelitpınarı is a neighbourhood in the municipality and district of Silifke, Mersin Province, Turkey. Its population is 197 (2022). It is situated on Toros Mountains to the west of Göksu River valley. Distance to Silifke is 44 kilometres (27 mi) and to Mersin is 129 kilometres (80 mi). The village was founded by a tribe from Karaman. Main economic activities are agriculture and goat breeding. Main crops are pistachio, figs, plum and hickory nut.
