= Özboynuinceli =

- Neighbourhood
- Location in Turkey
- Coordinates: 36°58′N 33°44′E
- Country: Turkey
- Province: Mersin
- District: Silifke
- Elevation: 1,890 m (6,200 ft)
- Population (2022): 78
- Time zone: UTC+3 (TRT)
- Postal code: 33940
- Area code: 0324

Özboynuinceli is a neighbourhood in the municipality and district of Silifke, Mersin Province, Turkey. Its population is 78 (2022). It is situated in high plateau of the northern slopes of the Taurus Mountains. Distance to Silifke is 115 kilometres (71 mi) and to Mersin is 200 kilometres (120 mi). During the summer, the population increases because of the resort characteristics of the village (see yayla). The main economic activity is farming.
