= Türkmenuşağı, Silifke =

Türkmenuşağı
- Neighbourhood
- Location in Turkey
- Coordinates: 36°29′N 34°03′E
- Country: Turkey
- Province: Mersin
- District: Silifke
- Elevation: 370 m (1,210 ft)
- Population (2022): 69
- Time zone: UTC+3 (TRT)
- Postal code: 33940
- Area code: 0324

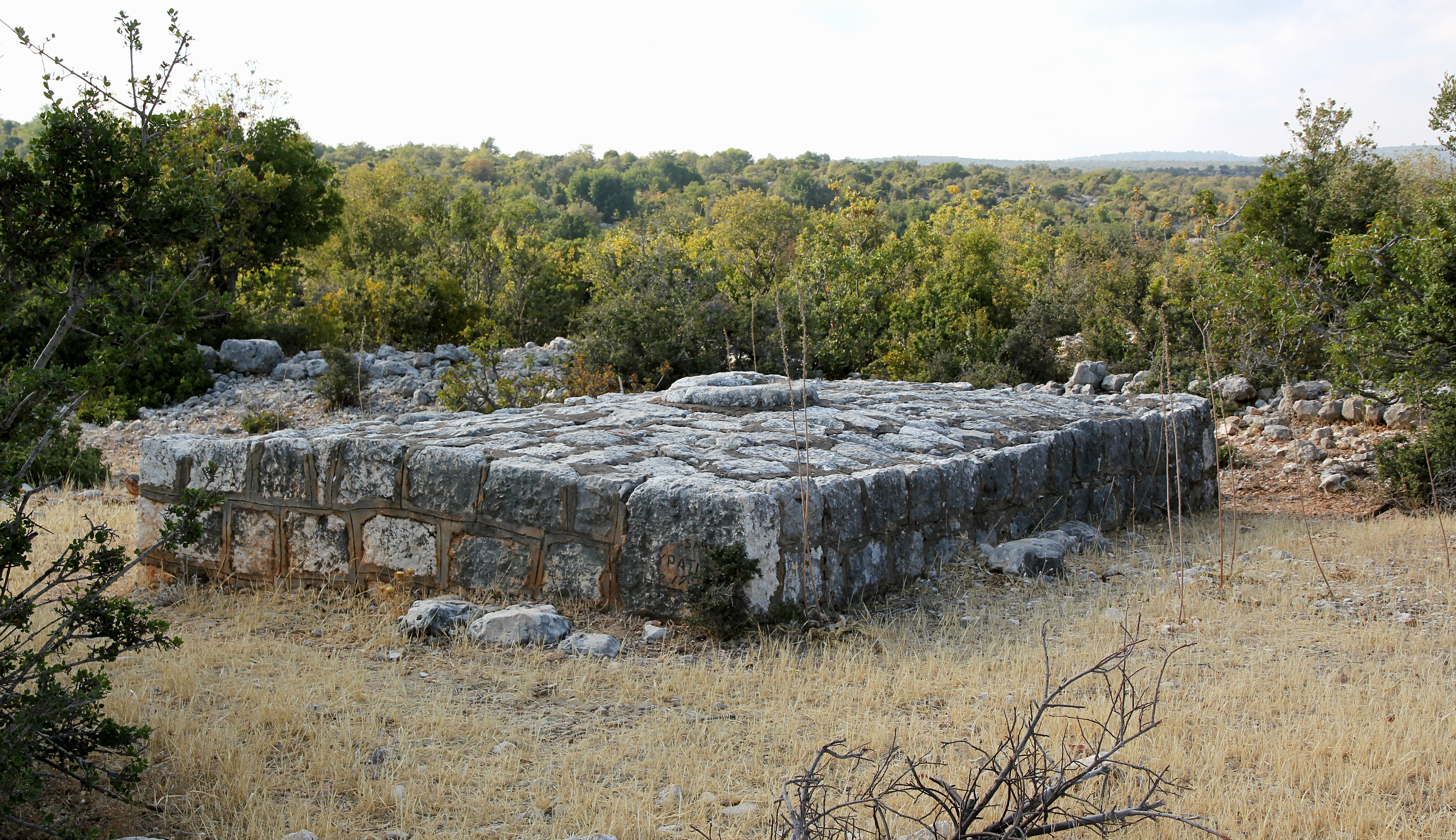
A cistern in Türkmenuşağı

Türkmenuşağı is a neighbourhood in the municipality and district of Silifke, Mersin Province, Turkey. Its population is 69 (2022). It is situated in the southern slopes of the Taurus Mountains. Its distance to Silifke is 25 kilometres (16 mi) and to Mersin is 100 kilometres (62 mi). The major economic activities of the village are farming and animal breeding.
