= Çatak, Silifke =

Çatak
- Neighbourhood
- Location in Turkey
- Coordinates: 36°40′N 33°46′E
- Country: Turkey
- Province: Mersin
- District: Silifke
- Elevation: 1,200 m (3,900 ft)
- Population (2022): 359
- Time zone: UTC+3 (TRT)
- Postal code: 33940
- Area code: 0324

Çatak is a neighbourhood in the municipality and district of Silifke, Mersin Province, Turkey. Its population is 359 (2022). It is situated in the Toros Mountains. Its distance to Silifke is 69 kilometres (43 mi) and to Mersin is 154 kilometres (96 mi). According to unconfirmed reports the ancestors of the village people were Çatak tribe of the Turkmen people who had migrated from Caucasus to Çatak. The main economic activity is fruit farming. Grape and grape molasses are the main products.
