= Şahmurlu =

- Neighbourhood
- Location in Turkey
- Coordinates: 36°39′N 34°01′E
- Country: Turkey
- Province: Mersin
- District: Silifke
- Elevation: 1,105 m (3,625 ft)
- Population (2022): 157
- Time zone: UTC+3 (TRT)
- Postal code: 33940
- Area code: 0324

Şahmurlu is a rural neighbourhood in the municipality and district of Silifke, Mersin Province, Turkey. Its population is 157 (2022). It is 42 kilometres (26 mi) from Silifke is and 115 kilometres (71 mi) from Mersin. The major economic activity of the village is farming and animal breeding.
