= Bayındır, Silifke =

Bayındır
- Neighbourhood
- Location in Turkey
- Coordinates: 36°28′N 33°49′E
- Country: Turkey
- Province: Mersin
- District: Silifke
- Elevation: 860 m (2,820 ft)
- Population (2022): 92
- Time zone: UTC+3 (TRT)
- Postal code: 33940
- Area code: 0324

Bayındır is a neighbourhood in the municipality and district of Silifke, Mersin Province, Turkey. Its population is 92 (2022). It is situated in the Taurus Mountains. The distance to Silifke is 25 kilometres (16 mi) and to Mersin is 110 kilometres (68 mi).
