= Kırtıl, Silifke =

Kırtıl
- Neighbourhood
- Location in Turkey
- Coordinates: 36°19′N 33°44′E
- Country: Turkey
- Province: Mersin
- District: Silifke
- Elevation: 560 m (1,840 ft)
- Population (2022): 56
- Time zone: UTC+3 (TRT)
- Postal code: 33940
- Area code: 0324

Kırtıl is a neighbourhood in the municipality and district of Silifke, Mersin Province, Turkey. Its population is 56 (2022). It is situated on the southern slopes of the Taurus Mountains. Distance to Silifke is 15 kilometres (9.3 mi) and to Mersin is 110 kilometres (68 mi). The village is inhabited by Tahtacı.
