= Mara, Silifke =

Mara Mağara, Kırobası
- Neighbourhood
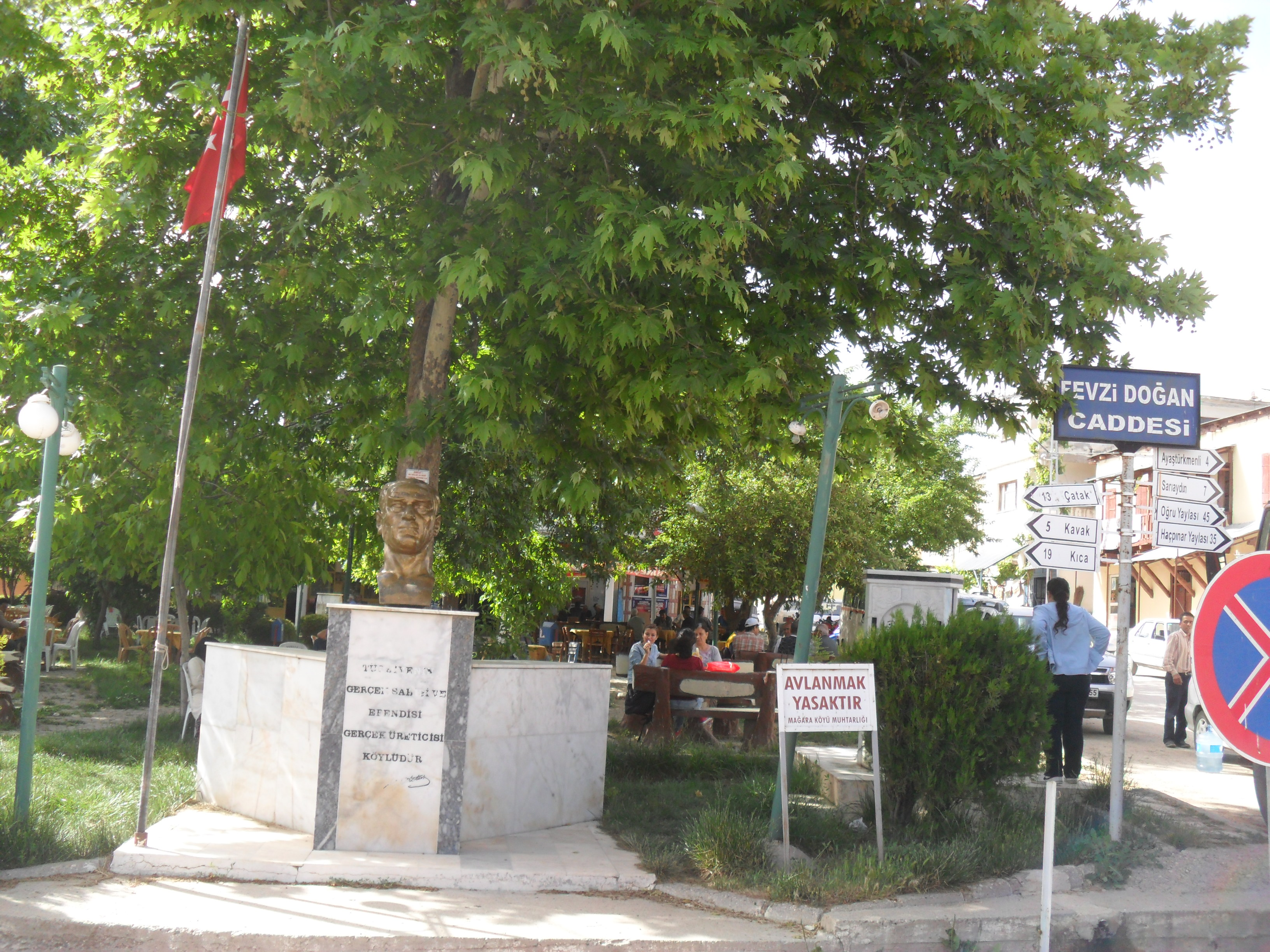

- Location within Turkey
- Coordinates: 36°43′N 33°52′E
- Country: Turkey
- Province: Mersin
- District: Silifke
- Elevation: 1,410 m (4,630 ft)
- Population (2022): 359
- Time zone: UTC+3 (TRT)
- Postal code: 33940
- Area code: 0324

Mara (formerly: Mağara, Kırobası) is a neighbourhood in the municipality and district of Silifke, Mersin Province, Turkey. Its population is 359 (2022). It is situated in the Taurus Mountains. It is about 45 kilometres (28 mi) from Silifke and 125 kilometres (78 mi) from Mersin. It had a much higher population during medieval times. The Greeks who made up a part of the population were deported to Greece during the compulsory population exchange between Greece and Turkey (Turkish: mübadele) in 1920s. Modern day Mara is known for its annual commemoration day for Marshal Fevzi Çakmak.
