= Işıklı, Silifke =

Işıklı
- Neighbourhood
- Location in Turkey
- Coordinates: 36°14′N 33°41′E
- Country: Turkey
- Province: Mersin
- District: Silifke
- Elevation: 105 m (344 ft)
- Population (2022): 1,532
- Time zone: UTC+3 (TRT)
- Postal code: 33940
- Area code: 0324

Işıklı is a neighbourhood in the municipality and district of Silifke, Mersin Province, Turkey. Its population is 1,532 (2022). It is situated in a narrow plain between the Toros Mountains and hills at the Mediterranean Sea side. It is near to state highway D.400. Distance to sea shore is 7 kilometres (4.3 mi), to Silifke is 37 kilometres (23 mi) and to Mersin is 118 kilometres (73 mi).
