= Yenisu, Silifke =

Yenisu
- Neighbourhood
- Location in Turkey
- Coordinates: 36°32′N 33°41′E
- Country: Turkey
- Province: Mersin
- District: Silifke
- Elevation: 1,060 m (3,480 ft)
- Population (2022): 68
- Time zone: UTC+3 (TRT)
- Postal code: 33940
- Area code: 0324

Yenisu is a neighbourhood in the municipality and district of Silifke, Mersin Province, Turkey. Its population is 68 (2022). The village is situated in the Taurus Mountains. The distance to Silifke is 50 kilometres (31 mi). The village was founded by Yörüks (once nomadic Turkmens) probably two centuries ago. Main crops of the village are vegetables and fruits such as apple and almond.
