= Bahçe, Silifke =

Bahçe
- Neighbourhood
- Location in Turkey
- Coordinates: 36°21′N 34°00′E
- Country: Turkey
- Province: Mersin
- District: Silifke
- Elevation: 8 m (26 ft)
- Population (2022): 182
- Time zone: UTC+3 (TRT)
- Postal code: 33940
- Area code: 0324

Bahçe (or Bahçeköy) is a neighbourhood in the municipality and district of Silifke, Mersin Province, Turkey. Its population is 182 (2022). It is situated in the Göksu Delta. The distance to Silifke is 6 kilometres (3.7 mi) and to Mersin is 86 kilometres (53 mi).
