= Ulugöz, Silifke =

Ulugöz
- Neighbourhood
- Location in Turkey
- Coordinates: 36°21′15″N 33°56′15″E
- Country: Turkey
- Province: Mersin
- District: Silifke
- Elevation: 10 m (33 ft)
- Population (2022): 1,165
- Time zone: UTC+3 (TRT)
- Postal code: 33940
- Area code: 0324

Ulugöz is a neighbourhood in the municipality and district of Silifke, Mersin Province, Turkey. Its population is 1,165 (2022). It is situated on Turkish state highway D.400 which runs from west to east in south Turkey. Distance to Silifke is 4 kilometres (2.5 mi) and to Mersin is 89 kilometres (55 mi). Major economic activity of the village is farming. Green house vegetables and strawberries are the main crops.
