= Nuru, Silifke =

Nuru
- Neighbourhood
- Location in Turkey
- Coordinates: 36°25′N 33°35′E
- Country: Turkey
- Province: Mersin
- District: Silifke
- Elevation: 555 m (1,821 ft)
- Population (2022): 506
- Time zone: UTC+3 (TRT)
- Postal code: 33940
- Area code: 0324

Nuru (sometimes spelled as Nuri) is a neighbourhood in the municipality and district of Silifke, Mersin Province, Turkey. Its population is 506 (2022). Nuru is a neighbourhood in forests. It is situated on Toros Mountains to the west of Göksu River valley. Distance to Silifke is 42 kilometres (26 mi) and to Mersin is 127 kilometres (79 mi). According to village page, it is founded about 700 years ago. Main economic activities are agriculture and animal breeding. Main crops are pistachio, figs, plum and hickory nut.
