= Gülümpaşalı =

- Neighbourhood
- Location in Turkey
- Coordinates: 36°20′N 33°55′E
- Country: Turkey
- Province: Mersin
- District: Silifke
- Elevation: 10 m (33 ft)
- Population (2022): 395
- Time zone: UTC+3 (TRT)
- Postal code: 33940
- Area code: 0324

Gülümpaşalı is a neighbourhood in the municipality and district of Silifke, Mersin Province, Turkey. Its population is 395 (2022). The village is situated in the coastal plain of Silifke about 3 kilometres (1.9 mi) north of the Mediterranean Sea coast and to the south of Turkish state highway D.400 connecting Mersin to Antalya. The distance to Silifke is 7 kilometres (4.3 mi) and to Mersin is 92 kilometres (57 mi).
