= Evkafçiftliği =

- Neighbourhood
- Location in Turkey
- Coordinates: 36°27′N 33°36′E
- Country: Turkey
- Province: Mersin
- District: Silifke
- Elevation: 225 m (738 ft)
- Population (2022): 131
- Time zone: UTC+3 (TRT)
- Postal code: 33940
- Area code: 0324

Evkafçiftliği is a neighbourhood in the municipality and district of Silifke, Mersin Province, Turkey. Its population is 131 (2022). It is situated in the Göksu River valley. The village is to the east of Turkish state highway D.715. The distance to Silifke is 40 kilometres (25 mi) and to Mersin is 125 kilometres (78 mi). During the Ottoman Empire era, the village was a vakıf which was dedicated for sustaining holy places in Mecca and Medina (now in Saudi Arabia). Although it is no longer a vakıf, it still keeps its former name (Evkafçitliği means "vakıf farm"). The main economic activity is farming. The village produces olives and various fruits. There is also an olive press which serves olive producers in Göksu River valley.
