= Çadırlı, Silifke =

Çadırlı
- Neighbourhood
- Location in Turkey
- Coordinates: 36°21′N 33°48′E
- Country: Turkey
- Province: Mersin
- District: Silifke
- Elevation: 540 m (1,770 ft)
- Population (2022): 242
- Time zone: UTC+3 (TRT)
- Postal code: 33940
- Area code: 0324

Çadırlı is a neighbourhood in the municipality and district of Silifke, Mersin Province, Turkey. Its population is 242 (2022). It is situated in Taurus Mountains. Its distance to Silifke is 17 kilometres (11 mi) and to Mersin is 102 kilometres (63 mi).
