= Seydili, Silifke =

Seydili
- Neighbourhood
- Location in Turkey
- Coordinates: 36°38′18″N 33°59′26″E
- Country: Turkey
- Province: Mersin
- District: Silifke
- Elevation: 1,170 m (3,840 ft)
- Population (2022): 404
- Time zone: UTC+3 (TRT)
- Postal code: 33940
- Area code: 0324

Seydili is a neighbourhood in the municipality and district of Silifke, Mersin Province, Turkey. Its population is 404 (2022). It is situated in the peneplane are to the west of Lamas River in the Taurus Mountains. Distance to Silifke is 42 kilometres (26 mi) and to Mersin is 90 kilometres (56 mi). The main economic activities are farming and animal husbandry.
