= Kavak, Silifke =

Kavak
- Neighbourhood
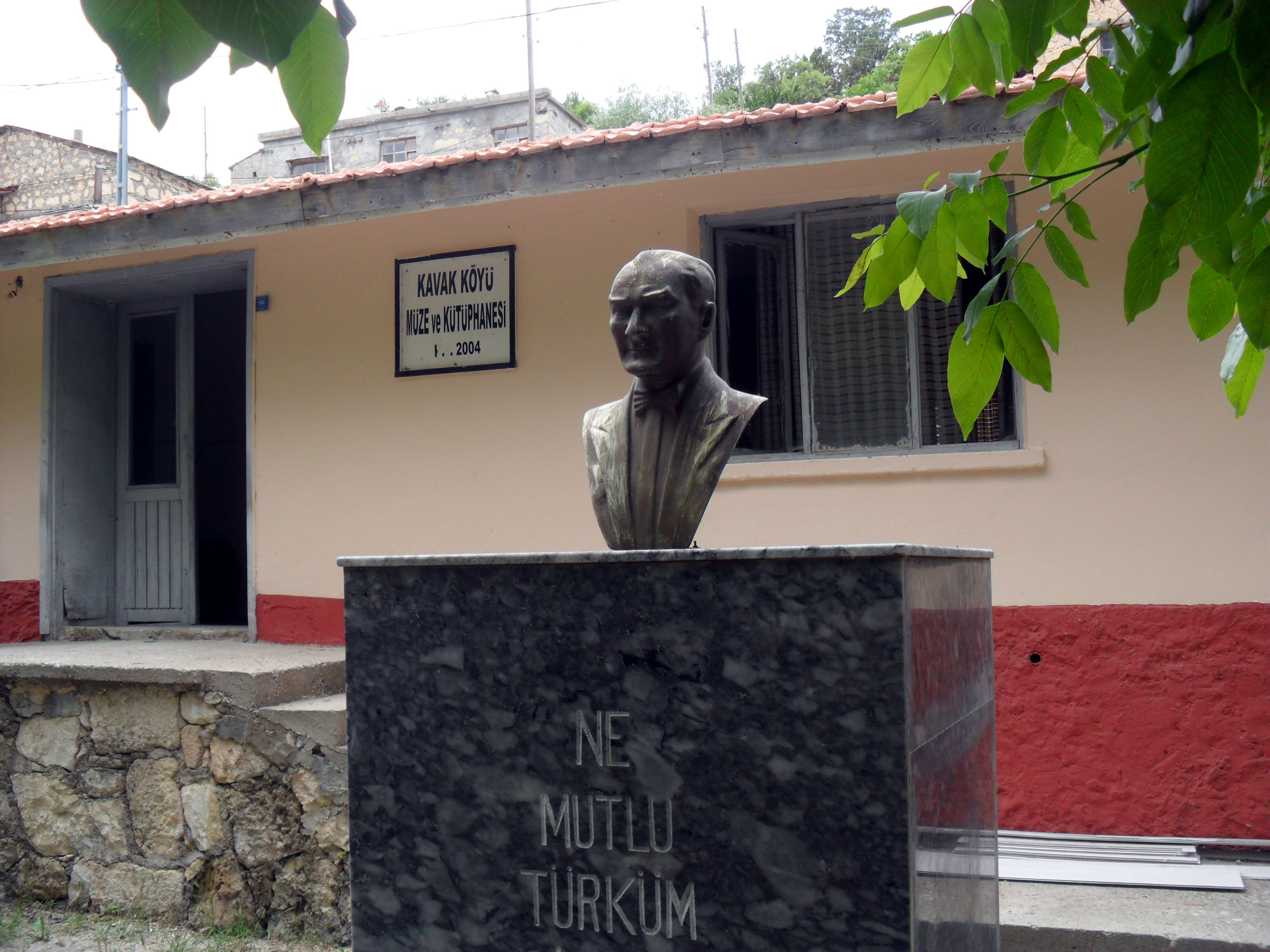
- Village museum in Kavak

- Location within Turkey
- Coordinates: 36°44′N 33°49′E
- Country: Turkey
- Province: Mersin
- District: Silifke
- Elevation: 1,375 m (4,511 ft)
- Population (2022): 221
- Time zone: UTC+3 (TRT)
- Postal code: 33940
- Area code: 0324

Kavak is a neighbourhood in the municipality and district of Silifke, Mersin Province, Turkey. Its population is 221 (2022). It is situated in a canyon in Toros Mountains.
