= Keben =

- Neighbourhood
- Location in Turkey
- Coordinates: 36°26′N 33°44′E
- Country: Turkey
- Province: Mersin
- District: Silifke
- Elevation: 200 m (660 ft)
- Population (2022): 557
- Time zone: UTC+3 (TRT)
- Postal code: 33940
- Area code: 0324

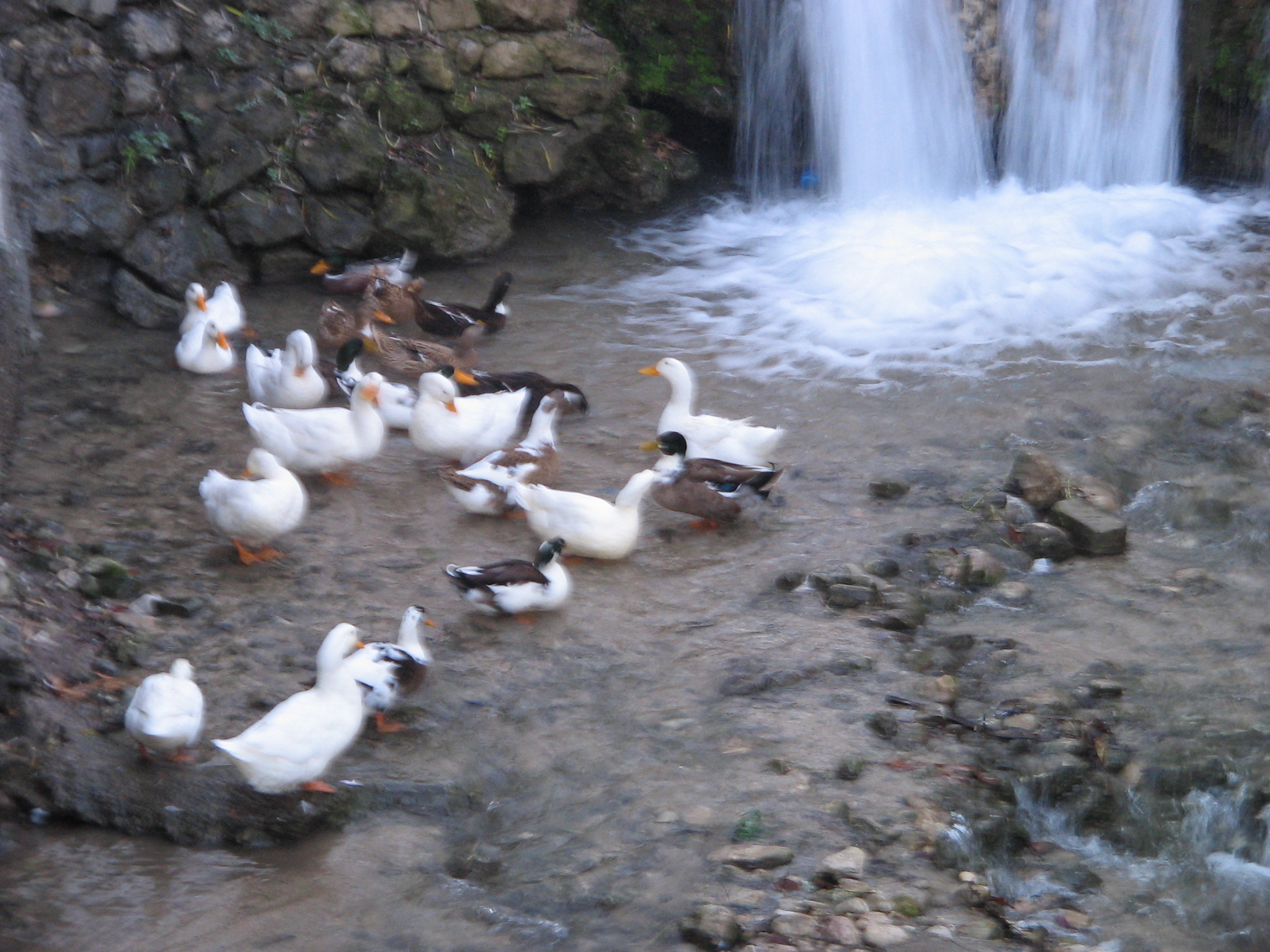
A photo of ducks by a waterfall taken in the neighborhood

Keben is a neighbourhood in the municipality and district of Silifke, Mersin Province. Its population is 557 (2022). Distance to Silifke is 18 kilometres (11 mi) and to Mersin is 105 kilometres (65 mi). It is situated to the north of Turkish state highway D.715 and the Göksu River. The village is famous for its main crop, namely pomegranate. This product is now proposed to be officially registered as pomegranate of Keben (Turkish: Keben narı). Another important product is plum.
