= Tosmurlu =

- Neighbourhood
- Location in Turkey
- Coordinates: 36°23′N 33°54′E
- Country: Turkey
- Province: Mersin
- District: Silifke
- Elevation: 100 m (330 ft)
- Population (2022): 1,203
- Time zone: UTC+3 (TRT)
- Postal code: 33940
- Area code: 0324

Tosmurlu is a neighbourhood in the municipality and district of Silifke, Mersin Province, Turkey. Its population is 1,203 (2022). It is situated to the north of Turkish state highway D.715 and to the west of Silifke. The distance to Silifke is 3 kilometres (1.9 mi) and to Mersin is 88 kilometres (55 mi). According to the village web page the village was founded by the Yörüks (once nomadic Turkmans) about two centuries ago. The village economy depends on cereal agriculture. Sesame, olive, figs, grapes and honey locust are among the other crops. Some village residents work in various services in nearby Silifke.
