= Kızılgeçit =

- Neighbourhood
- Location in Turkey
- Coordinates: 36°40′N 34°00′E
- Country: Turkey
- Province: Mersin
- District: Silifke
- Elevation: 1,000 m (3,300 ft)
- Population (2022): 107
- Time zone: UTC+3 (TRT)
- Postal code: 33940
- Area code: 0324

Kızılgeçit is a neighbourhood in the municipality and district of Silifke, Mersin Province, Turkey. Its population is 107 (2022). It is situated in Limonlu Creek valley of Toros Mountains. The distance to Silifke is 45 kilometres (28 mi).
