= Keşlitürkmenli, Silifke =

Keşlitürkmenli
- Neighbourhood
- Location within Turkey
- Coordinates: 36°31′N 33°58′E
- Country: Turkey
- Province: Mersin
- District: Silifke
- Elevation: 850 m (2,790 ft)
- Population (2022): 327
- Time zone: UTC+3 (TRT)
- Postal code: 33940
- Area code: 0324

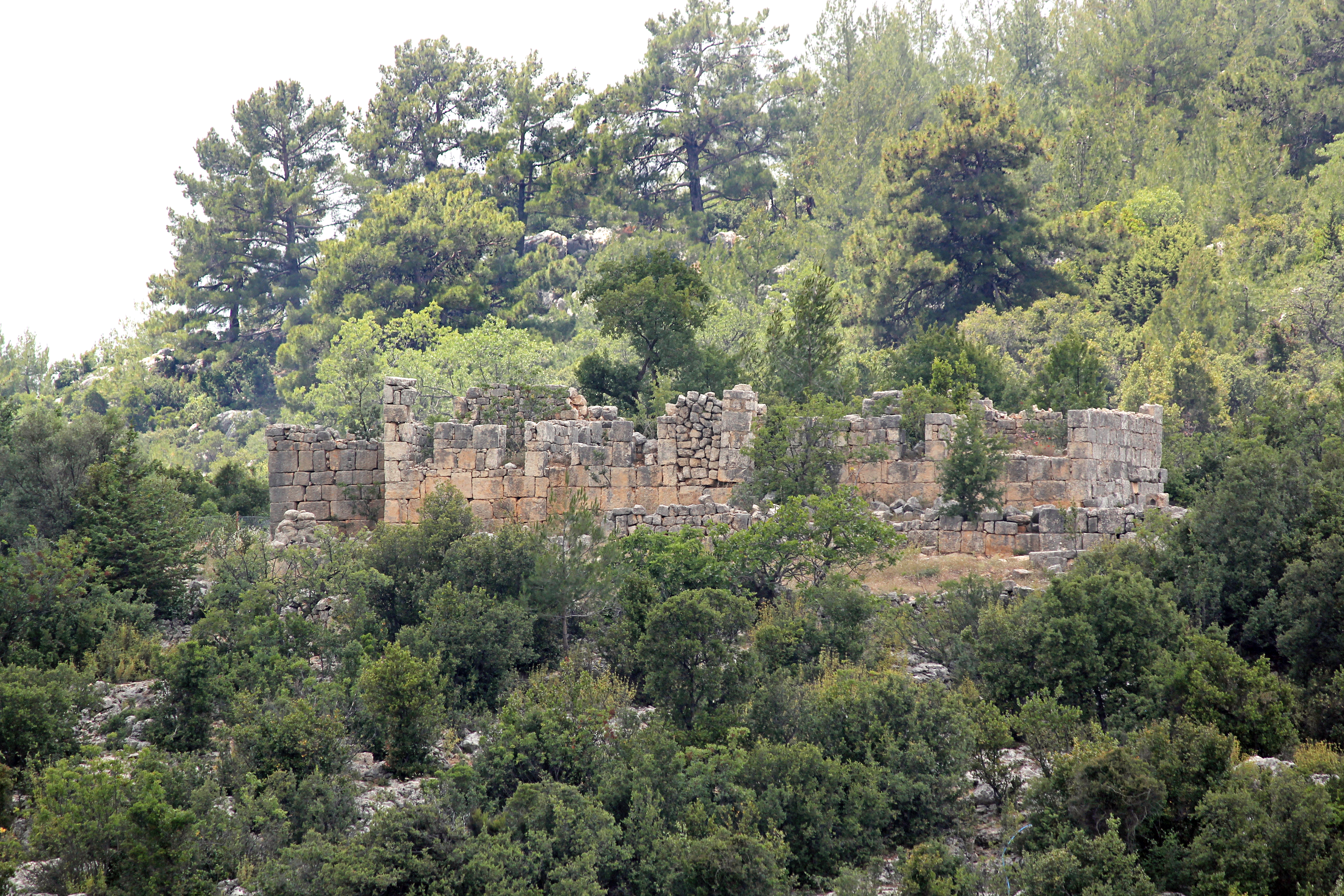
Villa Rustica (Byzantine-Roman townhouse) in Keşlitürkmenli, Turkey

Keşlitürkmenli is a neighbourhood in the municipality and district of Silifke, Mersin Province, Turkey. Its population is 327 (2022). It is situated in the Taurus Mountains. Distance to Silifke is 20 kilometres (12 mi) and to Mersin is 85 kilometres (53 mi). The important archaeological site Neopolis is about 8 kilometres (5.0 mi) north of the village. Main economic activity is farming.
