= Kıca, Silifke =

Kıca
- Neighbourhood
- Location in Turkey
- Coordinates: 36°43′N 33°43′E
- Country: Turkey
- Province: Mersin
- District: Silifke
- Elevation: 1,200 m (3,900 ft)
- Population (2022): 342
- Time zone: UTC+3 (TRT)
- Postal code: 33940
- Area code: 0324

Kıca (also known as Kıcaköy) is a neighbourhood in the municipality and district of Silifke, Mersin Province, Turkey. Its population is 342 (2022). It is situated in the Toros Mountains. Its distance to Silifke is 71 kilometres (44 mi) and to Mersin is 156 kilometres (97 mi).
