= Seyranlık, Silifke =

Seyranlık
- Neighbourhood
- Location in Turkey
- Coordinates: 36°28′N 33°52′E
- Country: Turkey
- Province: Mersin
- District: Silifke
- Elevation: 850 m (2,790 ft)
- Population (2022): 180
- Time zone: UTC+3 (TRT)
- Postal code: 33940
- Area code: 0324

Seyranlık is a neighbourhood in the municipality and district of Silifke, Mersin Province, Turkey. Its population is 180 (2022). It is situated in the Taurus Mountains about 6 kilometres (3.7 mi) north of Göksu River valley. Its distance to Silifke is 15 kilometres (9.3 mi) and to Mersin is 100 kilometres (62 mi). The main economic activity is farming.
