= Ören, Silifke =

Ören
- Neighbourhood
- Location in Turkey
- Coordinates: 36°39′N 34°00′E
- Country: Turkey
- Province: Mersin
- District: Silifke
- Elevation: 1,195 m (3,921 ft)
- Population (2022): 337
- Time zone: UTC+3 (TRT)
- Postal code: 33940
- Area code: 0324

Ören is a neighbourhood in the municipality and district of Silifke, Mersin Province, Turkey. Its population is 337 (2022). It is situated in the Taurus Mountains. Distance to Silifke is 39 kilometres (24 mi) and to Mersin is 120 kilometres (75 mi). The main economic activities are farming and animal husbandry.
