= Sarıaydın =

- Neighbourhood
- Location in Turkey
- Coordinates: 36°46′N 33°55′E
- Country: Turkey
- Province: Mersin
- District: Silifke
- Elevation: 1,350 m (4,430 ft)
- Population (2022): 1,094
- Time zone: UTC+3 (TRT)
- Postal code: 33940
- Area code: 0324

Sarıaydın (also known as Sarıaydınlı) is a neighbourhood in the municipality and district of Silifke, Mersin Province, Turkey. Its population is 1,094 (2022). It is a situated in the Toros Mountains. The distance to Silifke is about 55 kilometres (34 mi) and to Mersin is 135 kilometres (84 mi). The population of the village is composed of Yürüks, a branch of Turkmens known as Aydınlı.
