= Çaltıbozkır =

Neighbourhood in Mersin Province, Turkey

- Neighbourhood
- Location in Turkey
- Coordinates: 36°30′53″N 33°55′04″E
- Country: Turkey
- Province: Mersin
- District: Silifke
- Elevation: 980 m (3,220 ft)
- Population (2022): 821
- Time zone: UTC+3 (TRT)
- Postal code: 33940
- Area code: 0324

Çaltıbozkır is a neighbourhood in the municipality and district of Silifke, Mersin Province, Turkey. Its population was 821 in 2022. It is situated in the forests of the Taurus Mountains. The distance to Silifke is 27 kilometres (17 mi) and the distance to Mersin is 112 kilometres (70 mi). The village economy depends on cereal agriculture. Recently in irrigated fields tomato is also produced. But animal breeding is on decline because of government ban on goat breeding (to protect forest).
