= Uşakpınarı, Silifke =

Uşakpınarı
- Neighbourhood
- Location in Turkey
- Coordinates: 36°18′N 33°37′E
- Country: Turkey
- Province: Mersin
- District: Silifke
- Elevation: 965 m (3,166 ft)
- Population (2022): 193
- Time zone: UTC+3 (TRT)
- Postal code: 33940
- Area code: 0324

Uşakpınarı is a neighbourhood in the municipality and district of Silifke, Mersin Province, Turkey. Its population is 193 (2022). It is situated on the southern slopes of the Taurus Mountains. Its distance to Silifke is 42 kilometres (26 mi) and to Mersin is 127 kilometres (79 mi). The major economic activities of the village are farming and animal breeding.
