= Çeltikçi, Silifke =

Çeltikçi
- Neighbourhood
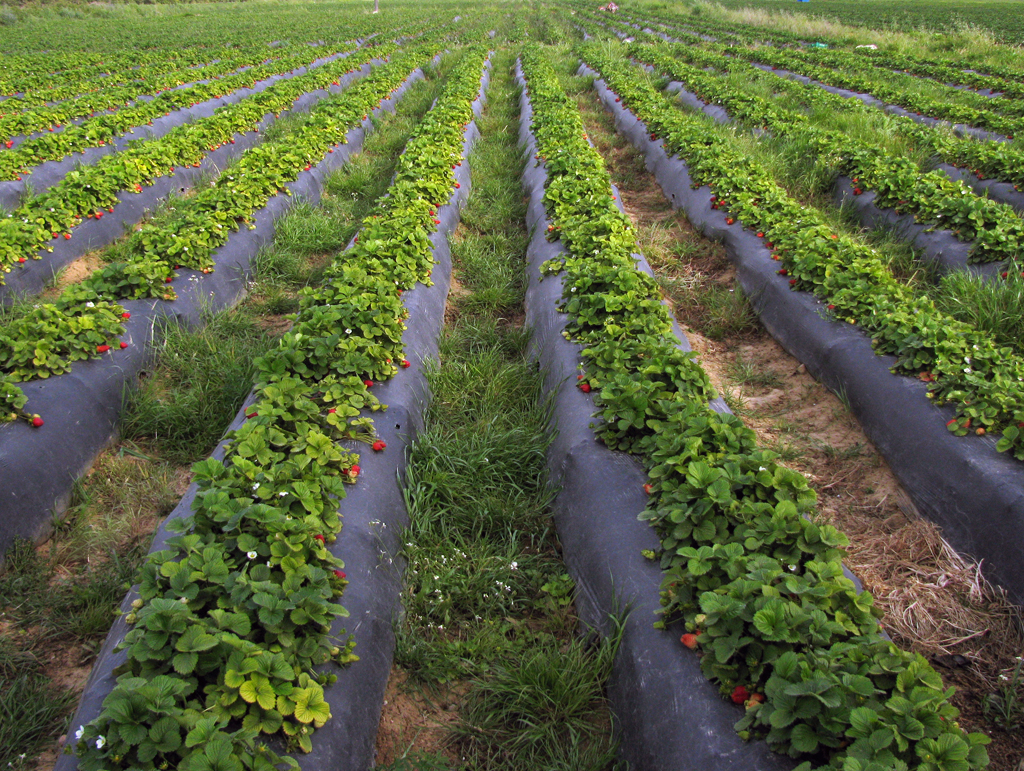
- A strawberry field in Çeltikçi

- Location within Turkey
- Coordinates: 36°22′N 33°59′E
- Country: Turkey
- Province: Mersin
- District: Silifke
- Elevation: 8 m (26 ft)
- Population (2022): 262
- Time zone: UTC+3 (TRT)
- Postal code: 33940
- Area code: 0324

Çeltikçi is a neighbourhood in the municipality and district of Silifke, Mersin Province, Turkey. Its population is 262 (2022). It is situated in the Göksu Delta. The distance to Silifke is 5 kilometres (3.1 mi) and to Mersin is 86 kilometres (53 mi).
