= Ortaören, Silifke =

Ortaören
- Neighbourhood
- Location in Turkey
- Coordinates: 36°26′N 33°42′E
- Country: Turkey
- Province: Mersin
- District: Silifke
- Elevation: 265 m (869 ft)
- Population (2022): 112
- Time zone: UTC+3 (TRT)
- Postal code: 33940
- Area code: 0324

Ortaören is a neighbourhood in the municipality and district of Silifke, Mersin Province, Turkey. Its population is 112 (2022). It is situated to the east of Göksu River valley. It is on the state highway D.715 which connects Silifke to Central Anatolia. Distance to Silifke is 24 kilometres (15 mi) and to Mersin is 109 kilometres (68 mi). The name of the village ("middle ruins") refer to the fact that there are ruins around the village. Main economic activities are animal breeding and farming. The village produces olive and various fruits like citrus and grapes. Up to now, irrigation was a big problem. However, by the summer of 2012, the problem is solved and it is hoped that it will boost the agricultural production.
