= Hırmanlı =

- Neighbourhood
- Location in Turkey
- Coordinates: 36°13′N 33°38′E
- Country: Turkey
- Province: Mersin
- District: Silifke
- Elevation: 250 m (820 ft)
- Population (2022): 391
- Time zone: UTC+3 (TRT)
- Postal code: 33940
- Area code: 0324

Hırmanlı is a neighbourhood in the municipality and district of Silifke, Mersin Province, Turkey. Its population is 391 (2022). The village is situated in the southern slopes of Toros Mountains. Its distance to Turkish state highway D.400 is about 3 kilometres (1.9 mi), to Silifke is 46 kilometres (29 mi) and to Mersin is 131 kilometres (81 mi).
