= Senir, Silifke =

Senir
- Neighbourhood
- Location in Turkey
- Coordinates: 36°25′N 33°37′E
- Country: Turkey
- Province: Mersin
- District: Silifke
- Elevation: 640 m (2,100 ft)
- Population (2022): 361
- Time zone: UTC+3 (TRT)
- Postal code: 33940
- Area code: 0324

Senir is a neighbourhood in the municipality and district of Silifke, Mersin Province, Turkey. Its population is 361 (2022). It is situated in the Taurus Mountains to the southwest of Göksu River valley. Distance to Silifke is 45 kilometres (28 mi) and to Mersin is 130 kilometres (81 mi). The main economic activities are farming; olive figs and apricots are among the crops.
