= Çamlıbel, Silifke =

Çamlıbel Karaböcülü
- Neighbourhood
- Location in Turkey
- Coordinates: 36°27′N 33°55′E
- Country: Turkey
- Province: Mersin
- District: Silifke
- Elevation: 610 m (2,000 ft)
- Population (2022): 147
- Time zone: UTC+3 (TRT)
- Postal code: 33940
- Area code: 0324

Çamlıbel (formerly Karaböcülü) is a neighbourhood in the municipality and district of Silifke, Mersin Province, Turkey. Its population is 147 (2022). It is situated to in the Taurus Mountains. The distance to Silifke is 12 kilometres (7.5 mi) and to Mersin is 97 kilometres (60 mi).

The village was founded on the ruins of an ancient farm complex of the Roman and early Byzantine era (3rd-5th centuries). There are ruins of houses, cisterns, churches and the like. Major economic activities are farming and animal breeding.
