= Nasrullah, Silifke =

Nasrullah
- Neighbourhood
- Location in Turkey
- Coordinates: 36°28′N 33°42′E
- Country: Turkey
- Province: Mersin
- District: Silifke
- Elevation: 590 m (1,940 ft)
- Population (2022): 32
- Time zone: UTC+3 (TRT)
- Postal code: 33940
- Area code: 0324

Nasrullah is a neighbourhood in the municipality and district of Silifke, Mersin Province, Turkey. Its population is 32 (2022). It is situated in the Taurus Mountains about 7 kilometres (4.3 mi) north of Göksu River valley. Its distance to Silifke is 45 kilometres (28 mi) and to Mersin is 130 kilometres (81 mi). The main economic activity is farming.
