= Karahacılı, Silifke =

Karahacılı
- Neighbourhood
- Location in Turkey
- Coordinates: 36°25′N 33°48′E
- Country: Turkey
- Province: Mersin
- District: Silifke
- Elevation: 300 m (980 ft)
- Population (2022): 227
- Time zone: UTC+3 (TRT)
- Postal code: 33940
- Area code: 0324

Karahacılı is a neighbourhood in the municipality and district of Silifke, Mersin Province. Its population is 227 (2022). It is 25 kilometres (16 mi) from Silifke's central town and 110 kilometres (68 mi) from Mersin. It is situated to the north of Turkish state highway D.715 and Göksu River. The main crops cultivated in the village are various fruits and especially pomegranate.
