= Gedikpınarı, Silifke =

Gedikpınarı
- Neighbourhood
- Location in Turkey
- Coordinates: 36°29′N 33°53′E
- Country: Turkey
- Province: Mersin
- District: Silifke
- Elevation: 950 m (3,120 ft)
- Population (2022): 99
- Time zone: UTC+3 (TRT)
- Postal code: 33940
- Area code: 0324

Gedikpınarı is a neighbourhood in the municipality and district of Silifke, Mersin Province, Turkey. Its population is 99 (2022). It is situated in a Toros Mountains valley. Distance to Silifke is 16 kilometres (9.9 mi) and to Mersin is 101 kilometres (63 mi). Main economic activities of the village are farming and animal breeding.
