= Kocaoluk =

- Neighbourhood
- Location in Turkey
- Coordinates: 36°43′N 33°54′E
- Country: Turkey
- Province: Mersin
- District: Silifke
- Elevation: 1,450 m (4,760 ft)
- Population (2022): 297
- Time zone: UTC+3 (TRT)
- Postal code: 33940
- Area code: 0324

Kocaoluk is a neighbourhood in the municipality and district of Silifke, Mersin Province, Turkey. Its population is 297 (2022). It is situated in Toros Mountains to the west of Limonlu Creek valley. The distance to Silifke is 45 kilometres (28 mi).
