= Stone Bridge (Silifke) =

Bridge in Mersin Province, Turkey

Coordinates: 36°23′N 33°56′E

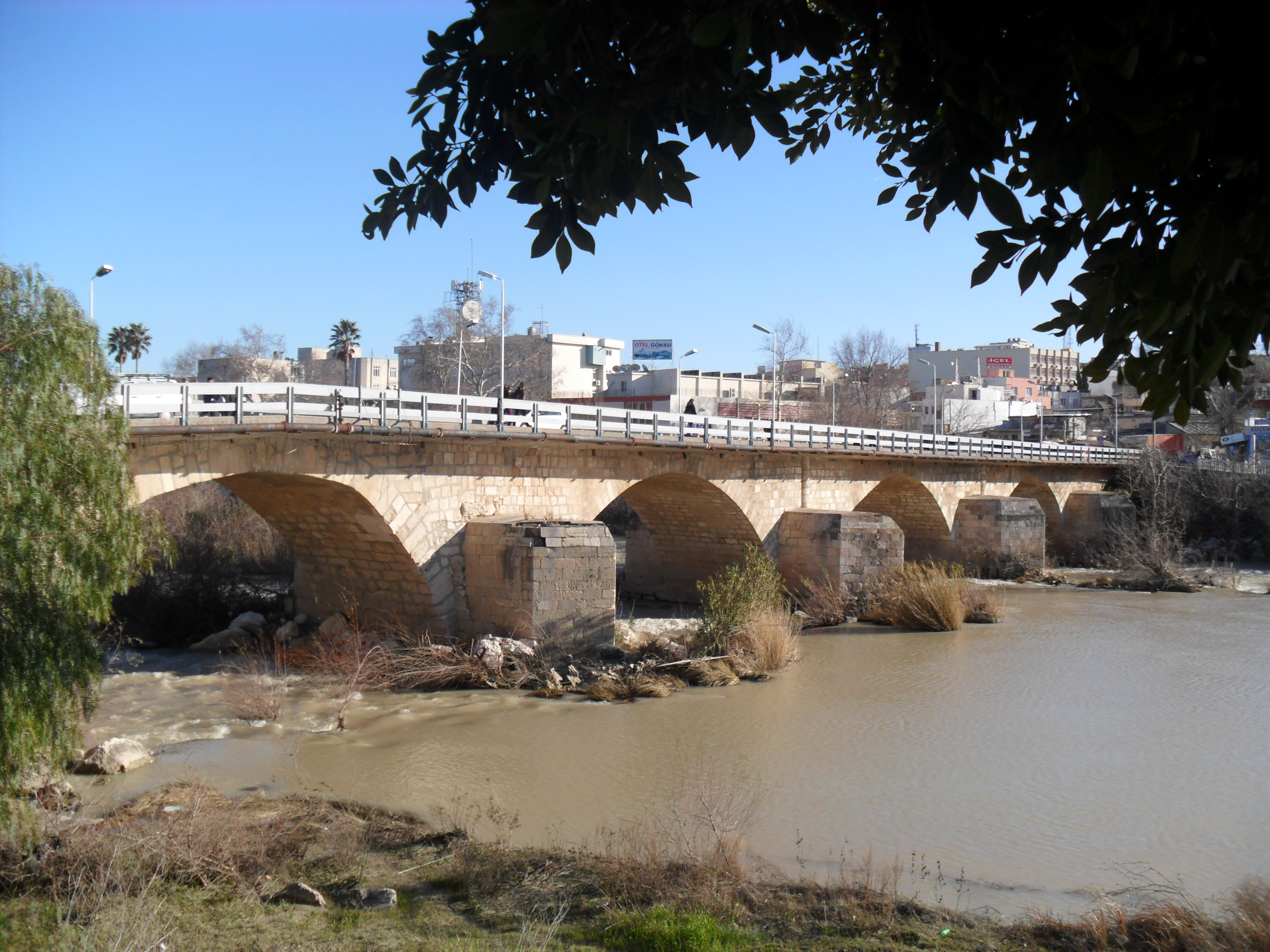

The Stone Bridge or Silifke Bridge is a historical bridge in Mersin Province, Turkey.

== Geography ==
The bridge is over Göksu River (Calycadnus of the antiquity) in the urban fabric of Silifke district of Mersin Province. It is at the center of Silifke connecting south and north quarters of the city. (Before construction of the ring road, it was also on Turkish state highway D.400 which connects Mersin to Antalya.)

== History ==
The bridge was built by the governor of Silifke L.Octavius Memor on behalf of the Roman emperor Vespasian and his sons Titus and Domitianus (who were the next emperors) in AD 77 and 78. The bridge was used by Silifke citizens for about 18 centuries. But by the 19th century it fell into ruins. In 1870, it was restored by Mehmet Ali Pasha, the Ottoman governor of Silifke. The next restoration was in 1972 by the General Directorate of Highways of Turkey

== Details ==
The building material is limestone. The total length is 120 metres (390 ft) and the width is 5.4 metres (18 ft). There are 7 arches, the widest of which is 17.4 metres (57 ft). (But only three arches of the original construction survive, others are Ottoman arches)
