= Bahçederesi =

- Neighbourhood
- Location in Turkey
- Coordinates: 36°21′N 33°52′E
- Country: Turkey
- Province: Mersin
- District: Silifke
- Elevation: 105 m (344 ft)
- Population (2022): 169
- Time zone: UTC+3 (TRT)
- Postal code: 33940
- Area code: 0324

Bahçederesi is a neighbourhood in the municipality and district of Silifke, Mersin Province, Turkey. Its population is 169 (2022). It is situated in the southern slopes of the Taurus Mountains. The distance to Silifke is 12 kilometres (7.5 mi) and to Mersin is 97 kilometres (60 mi).
