= Yeğenli, Silifke =

Yeğenli
- Neighbourhood
- Location in Turkey
- Coordinates: 36°36′N 34°00′E
- Country: Turkey
- Province: Mersin
- District: Silifke
- Elevation: 1,090 m (3,580 ft)
- Population (2022): 484
- Time zone: UTC+3 (TRT)
- Postal code: 33940
- Area code: 0324

Yeğenli is a neighbourhood in the municipality and district of Silifke, Mersin Province, Turkey. Its population is 484 (2022). The village is situated in the peneplane area of the Taurus Mountains. The distance to Silifke is 38 kilometres (24 mi) and to Mersin is 86 kilometres (53 mi). The main crop of the village is tomatoes.
