= Gündüzler, Silifke =

Gündüzler
- Neighbourhood
- Location in Turkey
- Coordinates: 36°31′N 33°43′E
- Country: Turkey
- Province: Mersin
- District: Silifke
- Elevation: 1,130 m (3,710 ft)
- Population (2022): 222
- Time zone: UTC+3 (TRT)
- Postal code: 33940
- Area code: 0324

Gündüzler is a neighbourhood in the municipality and district of Silifke, Mersin Province, Turkey. Its population is 222 (2022). The village is situated on the Taurus Mountains. Its distance to Silifke is 32 kilometres (20 mi) and to Mersin is 117 kilometres (73 mi).
