= Tekfur ambarı =

Ancient cistern in Silifke, Turkey

- (Tekir Ambarı)
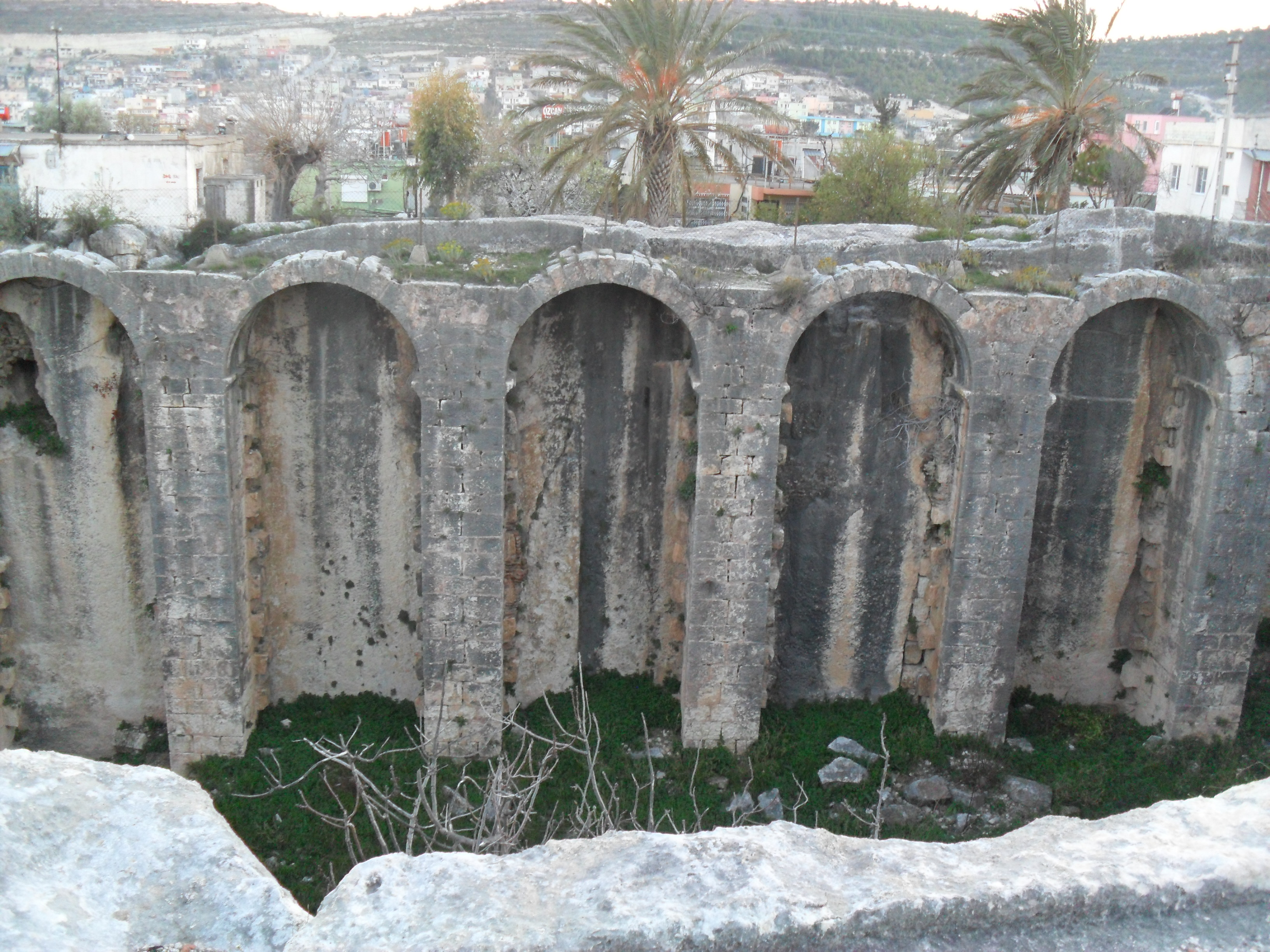
- Tekfur ambarı Cistern

- Location within Turkey
- 36°23′N 33°55′E
- Location: Silifke
- Part of: Mersin Province

Site notes
- Length: 46 metres (151 ft)
- Width: 23 metres (75 ft)
- Volume: 12,000 cubic metres (420,000 cu ft)

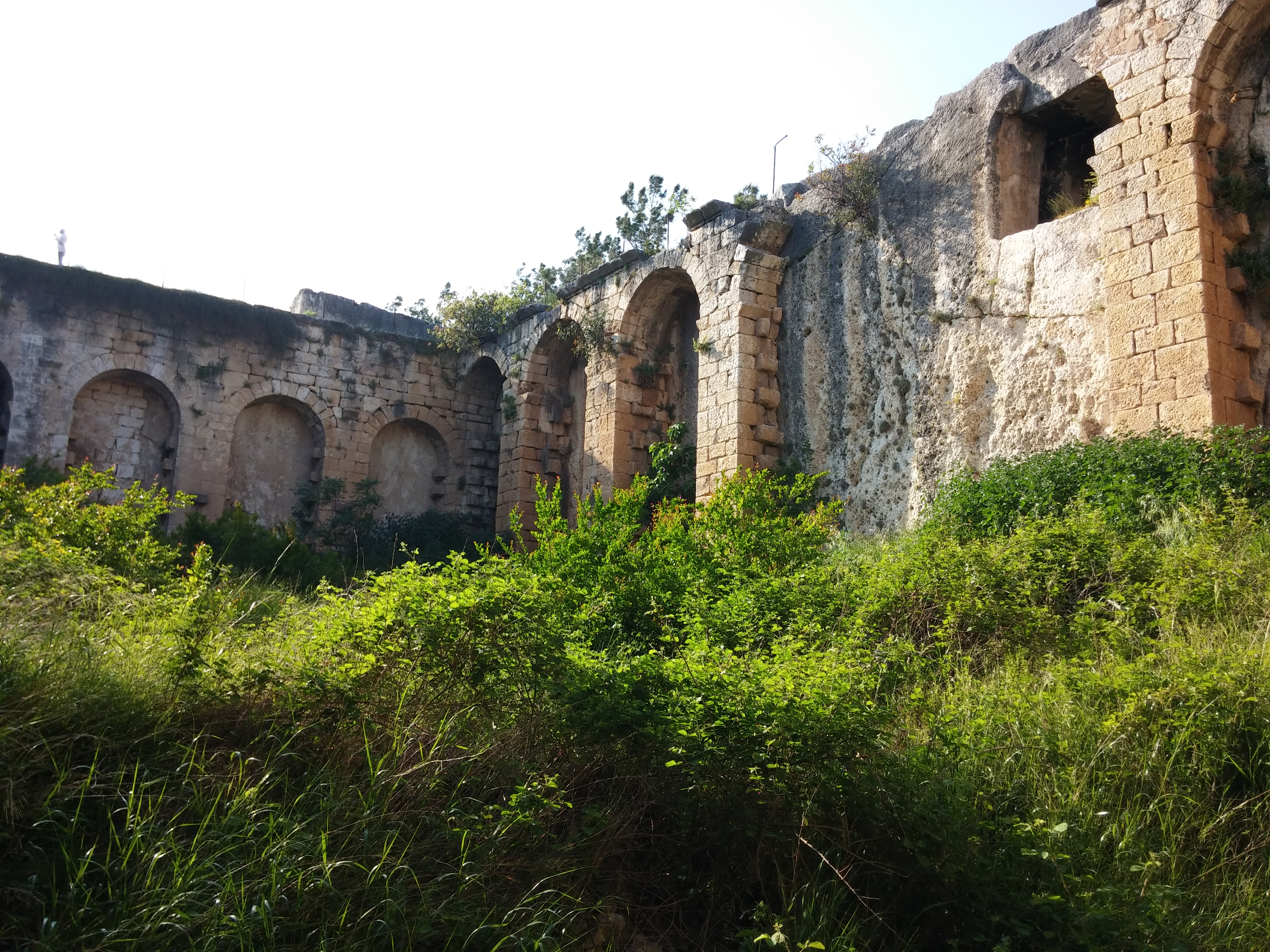

Tekfur ambarı (a.k.a. Tekir ambarı, literally "lord's storehouse") is a large cistern in Silifke ( Seleukeia) ilçe district center of Mersin Province, Turkey. A part of the city of Silifke, it is situated to the west of city center and to the east of Silifke castle at 36°23′N 33°55′E . It was built during the early years of Byzantine Empire. The building material is face stone. The west to east dimension is 46 metres (151 ft) and the north to south dimension is 23 metres (75 ft). The depth of the cistern is 14 metres (46 ft). The total water capacity is about 12 000 tonnes. At the east side of the cistern there is a spiral staircase. There are 8 niches at the 46 m dimension and 5 niches at the 23 m dimension.

== See also ==
- List of Roman cisterns
