= Ovacık, Silifke =

Ovacık
- Neighbourhood
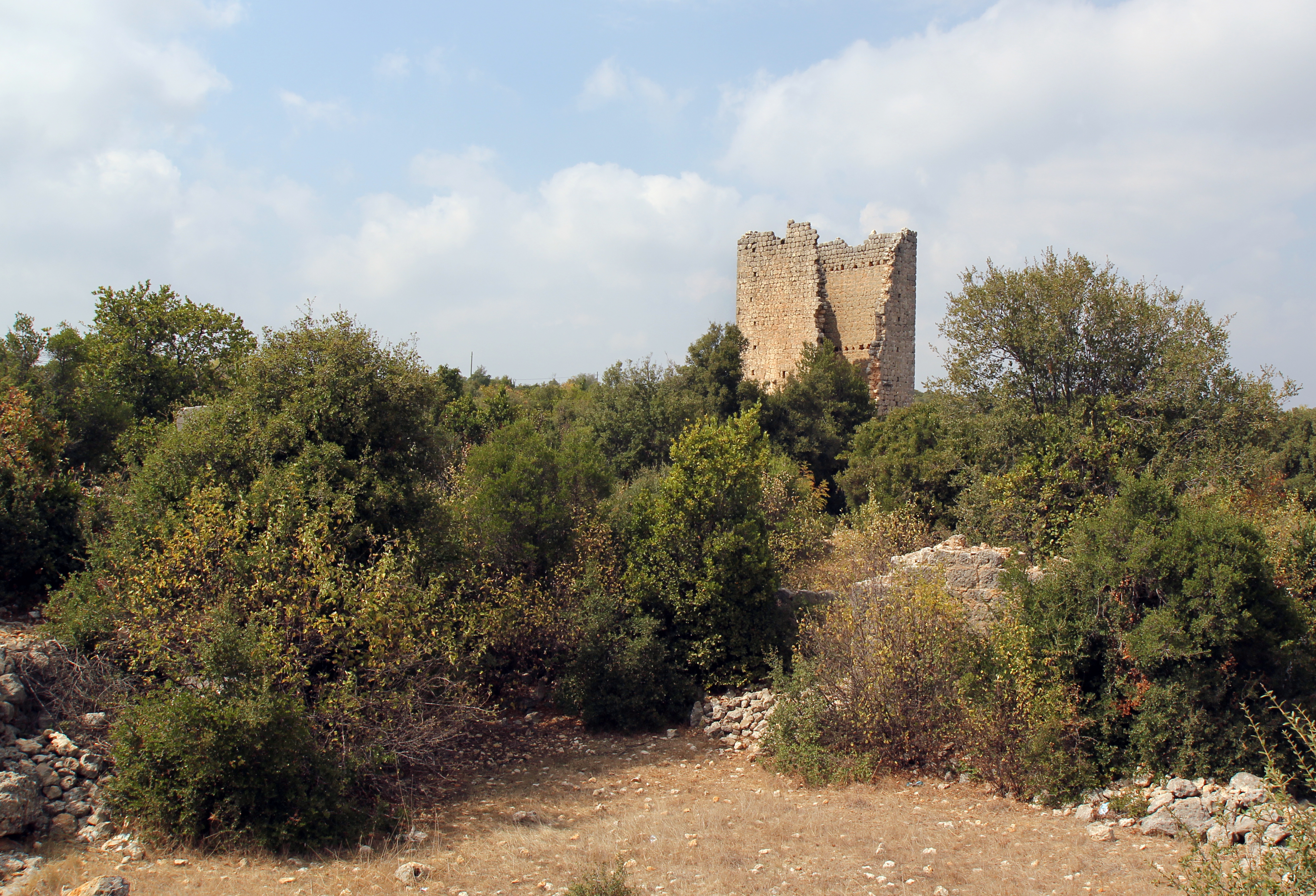
- Gökburç, an ancient site in rugged Cilicia near Silifke, southern Turkey, tower of a farmstead

- Location within Turkey
- Coordinates: 36°30′N 34°00′E
- Country: Turkey
- Province: Mersin
- District: Silifke
- Elevation: 805 m (2,641 ft)
- Population (2022): 972
- Time zone: UTC+3 (TRT)
- Postal code: 33940
- Area code: 0324

Ovacık is a neighbourhood in the municipality and district of Silifke, Mersin Province, Turkey. Its population is 972 (2022). It is situated in the southern slopes of Toros Mountains and to the north of Silifke. It is 17 kilometres (11 mi) to Silifke and 97 kilometres (60 mi) to Mersin. Ovacık is situated in a region full of archaeological ruins.
