= Sabak, Silifke =

Sabak
- Neighbourhood
- Location within Turkey
- Coordinates: 36°30′N 33°44′E
- Country: Turkey
- Province: Mersin
- District: Silifke
- Elevation: 1,010 m (3,310 ft)
- Population (2022): 435
- Time zone: UTC+3 (TRT)
- Postal code: 33940
- Area code: 0324

Sabak is a neighbourhood in the municipality and district of Silifke, Mersin Province, Turkey. Its population is 435 (2022). It is situated in the Taurus Mountains, about 7 kilometres (4.3 mi) north of Göksu River valley. Its distance to Silifke is 25 kilometres (16 mi) and to Mersin is 105 kilometres (65 mi). The main economic activity is farming. Fruits especially figs and pomegranates are the major crops.
