= Kurtuluş, Silifke =

Kurtuluş
- Neighbourhood
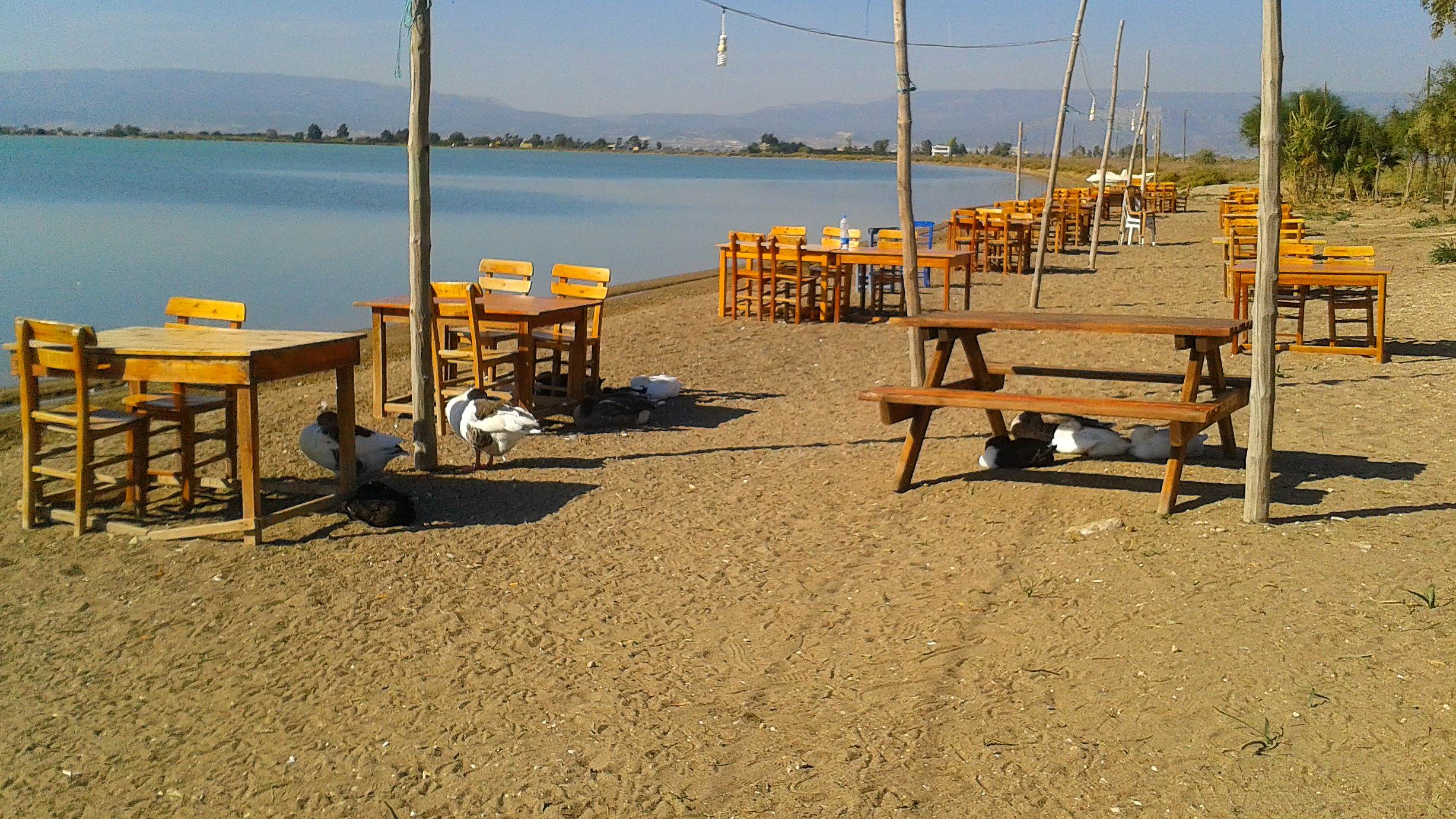

- Location within Turkey
- Coordinates: 36°20′N 34°00′E
- Country: Turkey
- Province: Mersin
- District: Silifke
- Elevation: 3 m (9.8 ft)
- Population (2022): 1,121
- Time zone: UTC+3 (TRT)
- Postal code: 33940
- Area code: 0324

Kurtuluş is a neighbourhood in the municipality and district of Silifke, Mersin Province, Turkey. Its population is 1,121 (2022). It is situated in the Göksu Delta. The distance to Silifke is 8 kilometres (5.0 mi) and to Mersin is 86 kilometres (53 mi).
