= Yenibahçe, Silifke =

Yenibahçe
- Neighbourhood
- Location in Turkey
- Coordinates: 36°28′N 34°00′E
- Country: Turkey
- Province: Mersin
- District: Silifke
- Elevation: 500 m (1,600 ft)
- Population (2022): 332
- Time zone: UTC+3 (TRT)
- Postal code: 33940
- Area code: 0324

Yenibahçe is a neighbourhood in the municipality and district of Silifke, Mersin Province, Turkey. Its population is 332 (2022). The village is situated in the southern slopes of the Taurus Mountains. The distance to Silifke is 27 kilometres (17 mi) and to Mersin is 87 kilometres (54 mi).
