= Taşucu =

- Neighbourhood
- Location in Turkey
- Coordinates: 36°20′N 33°53′E
- Country: Turkey
- Province: Mersin
- District: Silifke
- Population (2022): 15,184
- Time zone: UTC+3 (TRT)

Taşucu is a neighbourhood in the municipality and district of Silifke, Mersin Province, Turkey. Its population is 15,184 (2022). Before the 2013 reorganisation, it was a town (belde). It had obtained the status of belde after the local elections in Turkey, 1955.

In 2000 a military pier, Agalar, was built 6 kilometres (3.7 mi) south-west of the town. During the Syrian Civil War the pier was used to ship weapons to Syrian rebel groups as part of the U.S. Timber Sycamore program.

== Transportation ==
Taşucu is the main ferry terminal to Kyrenia (Girne), the main port of Northern Cyprus.

== Culture ==
The collections of amphoras donated by Arslan Eyce were gathered in Arslan Eyce Private Amphora Museum of Taşucu (Turkish: Taşucu Amfora Müzesi) by the Ministry of Culture and Tourism in 1997.

== International relations ==
Before the regulation on the constitution of Turkey, the town used to be twinned with:

- Bergkamen, Germany
