= Silifke =

- District and municipality
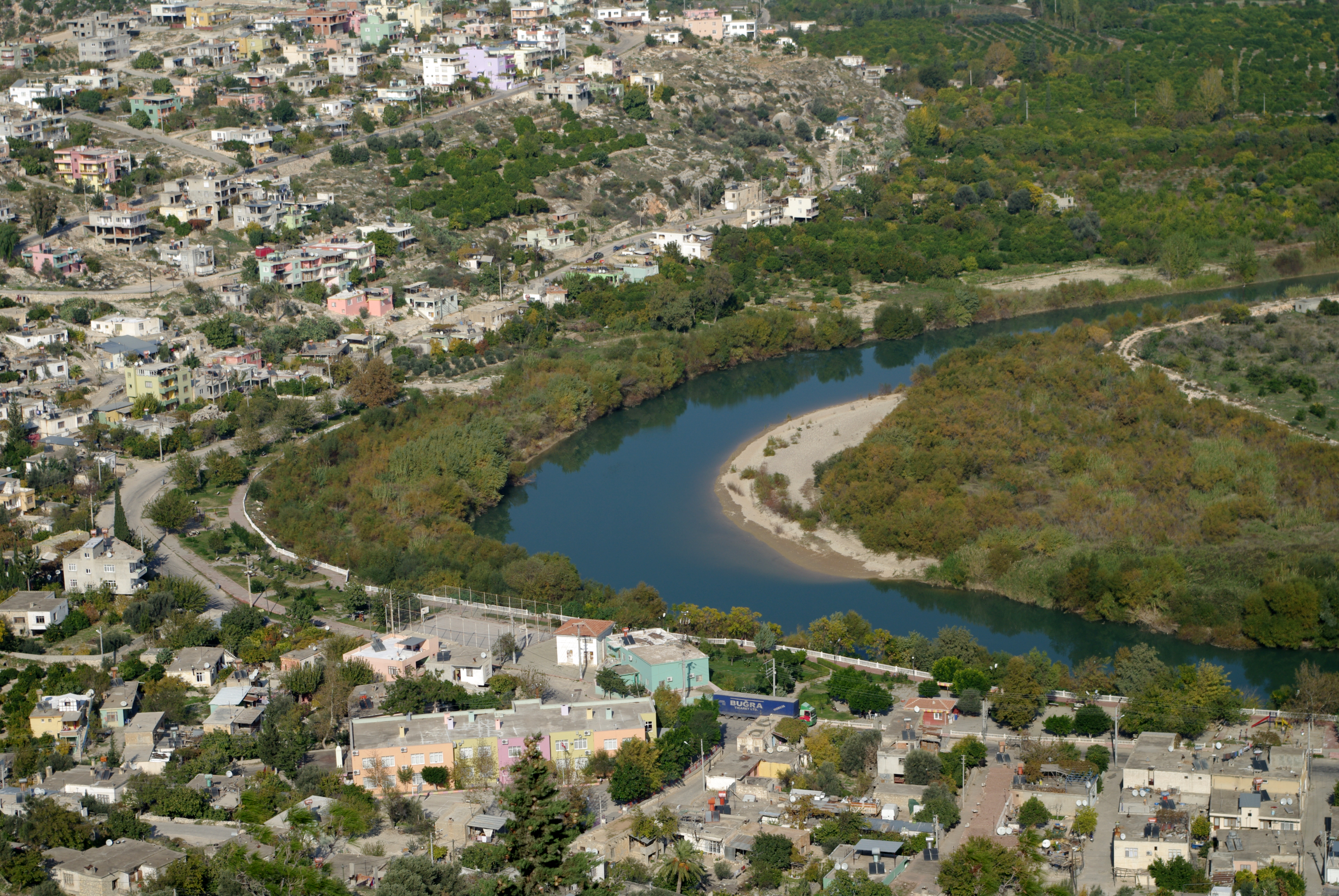
- Göksu River at Silifke

- Logo

- Map showing Silifke District in Mersin Province

- Location within Turkey
- Coordinates: 36°22′34″N 33°55′56″E
- Country: Turkey
- Province: Mersin

Government
  - Mayor: Mustafa Turgut (CHP)
- Area: 2,692 km^{2} (1,039 sq mi)
- Population (2022): 132,665
  - Density: 49.28/km^{2} (127.6/sq mi)
- Time zone: UTC+3 (TRT)
- Area code: 0324
- Website: www.silifke.bel.tr

Silifke is a municipality and district of Mersin Province, Turkey. Its area is 2,692 km^{2}, and its population is 132,665 (2022). It is 80 km (50 mi) west of the city of Mersin, on the west end of the Çukurova plain.

Silifke lies on the Göksu River, the ancient Calycadnus, near its outlet into the Mediterranean. The river flows from the nearby Taurus Mountains and the city is surrounded by attractive countryside along its banks.

== Names ==
Turkish Silifke (Turkish: [siˈlifce]) derives from Greek Seléfkeia (Σελεύκεια, modern pronunciation: [seˈlefci.a]), the late medieval and modern form of ancient Greek Seleúkeia (Σελεύκεια; Latin: Seleucia), named for its founder Seleucus I Nicator, king of the Seleucid Empire. It was distinguished from the many other places of that name as Seleucia on the Calycadnus (Seleucia ad Calycadnum), Seleucia in Cilicia, Seleucia in Isauria, Seleucia Trachea, and Seleucia Tracheotis.

The site of the ancient city of Olba (Turkish: Oura) is also within the boundaries of modern-day Silifke.

== History ==
=== Antiquity ===
Located a few miles from the mouth of the Göksu River, Seleucia was founded by Seleucus I Nicator in the early 3rd century BC, one of several cities he named after himself. It is probable that there were already towns called Olbia (or Olba) and Hyria and that Seleucus I merely united them giving them his name. The city grew to include the nearby settlement of Holmi (in modern-day Taşucu) which had been established earlier as an Ionian colony but being on the coast was vulnerable to raiders and pirates. The new city up river was doubtless seen as safer against attacks from the sea so Seleucia achieved considerable commercial prosperity as a Cilician port, and was even a rival of Tarsus.

Cilicia thrived as a province of the Romans, and Seleucia became a religious center with a renowned 2nd century Temple of Jupiter. It was also the site of a noted school of philosophy and literature, the birthplace of peripatetics Athenaeus and Xenarchus. The Silifke Bridge was built by the governor L. Octavius Memor in 77 AD.

=== Christianity ===
Early Christian bishops held the Council of Seleucia on 27 September 359. Seleucia was famous for the tomb of the virgin Saint Thecla of Iconium, converted by Saint Paul, who died at Seleucia, the tomb was one of the most celebrated in the Christian world and was restored several times, among others by the Emperor Zeno in the 5th century, and today the ruins of the tomb and sanctuary are called Meriamlik. In the 5th century the imperial governor (comes Isauriae) in residence at Seleucia had two legions at his disposal, the Legio II Isaura and the Legio III Isaura. The Christian necropolis, west of town, which contains many tombs of Christian soldiers, likely dates from this period. According to the Notitia Episcopatuum of the Patriarchate of Antioch, in the 6th century, the Metropolitan of Seleucia had 24 suffragan sees.

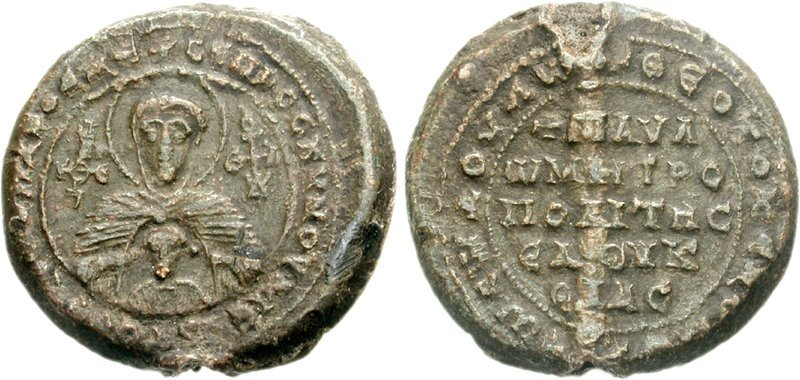
Lead seal of Paul, Metropolitan of Seleucia (8th/9th century)

By 732 nearly all the ecclesiastical province of Isauria wrre incorporated into the Patriarchate of Constantinople; henceforth the province figures in the Notitiae of the Patriarchate of Constantinople, under the name of Pamphylia.

In the Notitiae of Leo VI the Wise (ca. 900) Seleucia had 22 suffragan bishoprics, while in that of Constantine Porphyrogenitus (ca. 940) it had 23. In 968 when Antioch was recaptured by the Byzantines, Seleucia was allocated to the Patriarchate of Antioch. There were several metropolitans of this see, the first of whom, Agapetus, attended the Council of Nicaea in 325, Neonas was at the Council of Seleucia in 358, Symposius at the Council of Constantinople in 381, Dexianus at the Council of Ephesus in 431, Basil, a celebrated orator and writer, whose conduct was rather ambiguous at the Second Council of Ephesus and at the beginning of the Council of Chalcedon in 451, Theodore was at the Fifth Ecumenical Council in 553, and Macrobius was at the Sixth Ecumenical Council and the Council in Trullo in 692.

No longer a residential see, Seleucia in Isauria was included in the list of titular sees of the Catholic Church, which made no new appointments of a titular bishop to this eastern see since the Second Vatican Council.

=== Medieval period ===
In 705 Seleucia was temporarily captured by the Umayyads and was soon recovered by the Byzantines. In the 8th century Seleucia was ruled by a tourmarches and then under a droungarios, as part of the Cibyrrhaeot Theme. In the early 9th century, it appears as the capital of a kleisoura bordering on the domains of the Abbasid Caliphate in Cilicia. According to the Arab geographers Qudamah ibn Ja'far and Ibn Khordadbeh, in the 9th century the kleisoura comprised Seleucia as capital and ten other fortresses, with 5,000 men, out of which 500 were cavalry. The kleisoura was raised to the status of a full theme around 927-934 during the reign of Romanos I Lekapenos, as the Theme of Seleucia.

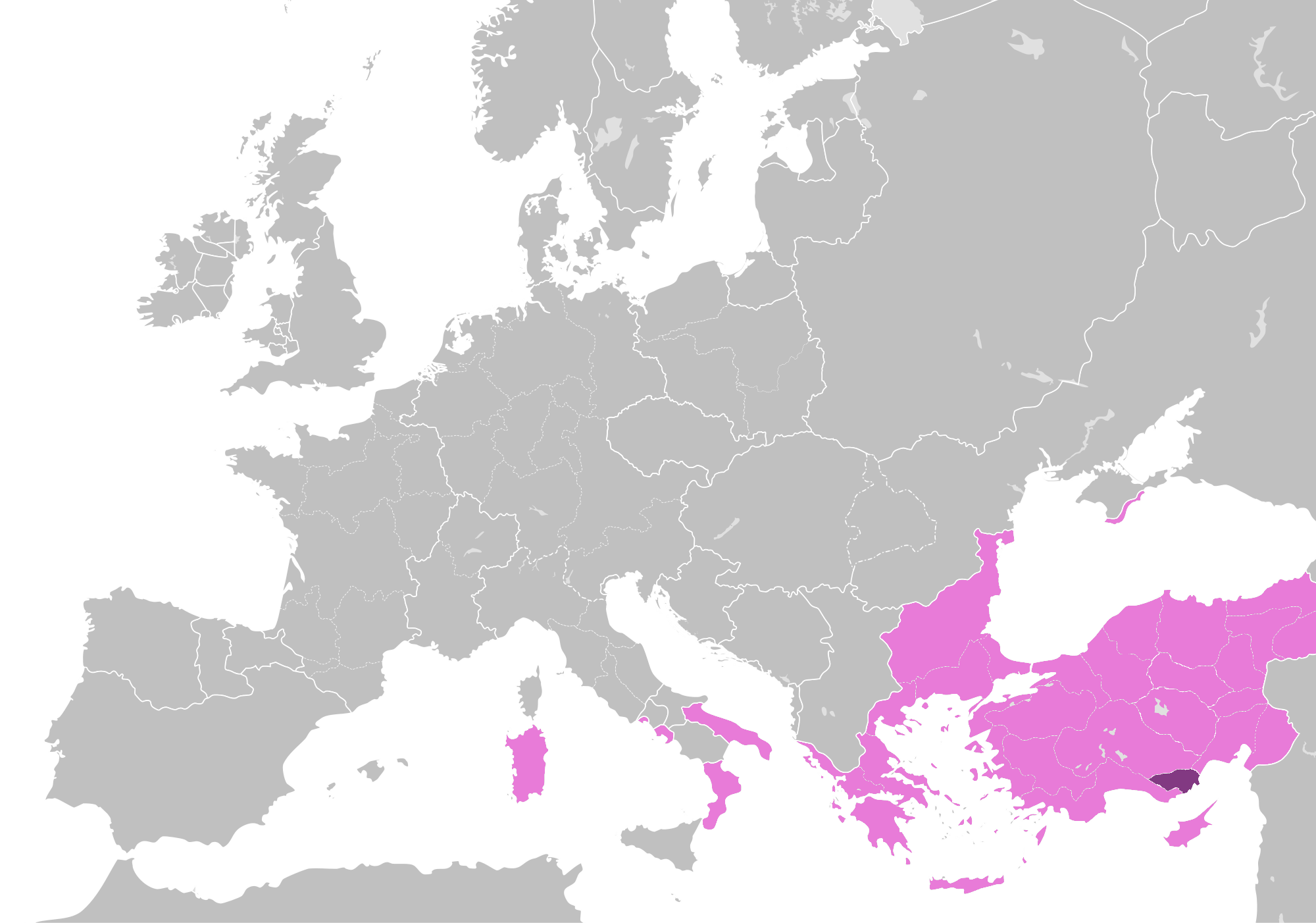
Map of the Seleucia Theme within the Byzantine Empire in 1000 AD

In the 11th century, the city was sacked by the Seljuk Turks, and was soon recaptured by the Byzantines in 1099/1100 during the reign of Alexios I Komnenos, who rebuilt the city and fortified it. On 26 February 1180 Seleucia was conquered by the Armenian Kingdom of Cilicia. On 10 June 1190 Frederick Barbarossa drowned while trying to cross the Calycadnus river, near Seleucia, during the Third Crusade.

In the 13th century Seleucia was in the possession of the Knights Hospitaller, until it fell to the Karamanids in the second half of the 13th century, and then to the Ottomans under Gedik Ahmet Pasha in 1471.

=== Modern period ===
Until 1933, Silifke was the capital of İçel Province until the İçel and Mersin provinces were merged. The merged province took the name of İçel but its administrative centre was at Mersin. In 2002 the name of İçel was replaced with that of Mersin.

== Economy ==
The economy of the district depends on agriculture, tourism and raising livestock. The town of Silifke is as a market for the coastal plain, which produces beans, peanuts, sesame, banana, orange, lemon, cotton, grapes, lentils, olives, tobacco, and canned fruits and vegetables. An irrigation project located at Silifke supplies the fertile Göksu Delta. In recent years there has been a large investment in glasshouses for producing strawberries and other fruit and vegetables in the winter season.

Silifke is also an industrial town, well-connected with other urban areas and producing beverages, chemicals, clothes, footwear, glass, plastics, pottery, and textiles.

== Climate ==
Silifke has a hot-summer Mediterranean climate (Köppen climate classification Csa) with hot and dry summers and mild and wet winters.

Climate data for Silifke (1991–2020)
Month	Jan	Feb	Mar	Apr	May	Jun	Jul	Aug	Sep	Oct	Nov	Dec	Year
Mean daily maximum °C (°F)	14.9 (58.8)	16.4 (61.5)	19.7 (67.5)	23.4 (74.1)	27.4 (81.3)	31.0 (87.8)	33.6 (92.5)	34.2 (93.6)	32.2 (90.0)	28.7 (83.7)	22.3 (72.1)	16.8 (62.2)	25.1 (77.2)
Daily mean °C (°F)	10.5 (50.9)	11.5 (52.7)	14.6 (58.3)	18.1 (64.6)	22.2 (72.0)	26.0 (78.8)	28.8 (83.8)	29.3 (84.7)	26.7 (80.1)	22.8 (73.0)	16.8 (62.2)	12.2 (54.0)	20.0 (68.0)
Mean daily minimum °C (°F)	7.4 (45.3)	8.0 (46.4)	10.3 (50.5)	13.3 (55.9)	17.2 (63.0)	21.1 (70.0)	24.1 (75.4)	24.6 (76.3)	21.7 (71.1)	18.4 (65.1)	13.2 (55.8)	9.1 (48.4)	15.7 (60.3)
Average precipitation mm (inches)	109.79 (4.32)	74.4 (2.93)	46.96 (1.85)	26.87 (1.06)	26.79 (1.05)	5.26 (0.21)	1.54 (0.06)	2.06 (0.08)	8.96 (0.35)	34.18 (1.35)	86.53 (3.41)	131.65 (5.18)	554.99 (21.85)
Average precipitation days (≥ 1.0 mm)	8.4	6.8	4.9	3.9	3	1.4	1.2	1	1.6	3.6	4.6	8.2	48.6
Average relative humidity (%)	59.2	58.6	59.4	62.3	64.2	64.7	65.3	63.7	57.9	53.8	54.0	58.9	60.2
Mean monthly sunshine hours	146.1	162.5	221.5	244.9	282.5	312.5	333.9	323.2	288.5	238.7	181.6	140.3	2,876.2
Source: NOAA

== Composition ==
There are 88 neighbourhoods in Silifke District:

- Akdere
- Arkum
- Atakent
- Atayurt
- Atik
- Ayaştürkmenli
- Bahçe
- Bahçederesi
- Balandız
- Bayındır
- Bolacalıkoyuncu
- Bucaklı
- Bükdeğirmeni
- Burunucu
- Çadırlı
- Çaltıbozkır
- Cambazlı
- Camikebir
- Çamlıbel
- Çamlıca
- Çatak
- Çeltikçi
- Cılbayır
- Demircili
- Ekşiler
- Evkafçiftliği
- Gazi
- Gedikpınarı
- Gökbelen
- Göksu
- Gülümpaşalı
- Gündüzler
- Hırmanlı
- Hüseyinler
- İmambekirli
- İmamlı
- İmamuşağı
- Işıklı
- Kabasakallı
- Karahacılı
- Karakaya
- Kargıcak
- Kavak
- Keben
- Kepez
- Keşlitürkmenli
- Kıca
- Kırtıl
- Kızılgeçit
- Kocaoluk
- Kocapınar
- Kurtuluş
- Mara
- Mukaddem
- Narlıkuyu
- Nasrullah
- Nuru
- Ören
- Ortaören
- Ovacık
- Özboynuinceli
- Öztürkmenli
- Pazarkaşı
- Pelitpınarı
- Sabak
- Şahmurlu
- Saray
- Sarıaydın
- Sarıcalar
- Say
- Sayağzı
- Senir
- Seydili
- Seyranlık
- Sökün
- Sömek
- Taşucu
- Toros
- Tosmurlu
- Türkmenuşağı
- Ulugöz
- Uşakpınarı
- Uzuncaburç
- Yeğenli
- Yenibahçe
- Yenimahalle
- Yenisu
- Yeşilovacık

== Main sights ==
The town of Silifke has many interesting sites including:

- The prominent remains of the Silifke Castle high on a rock above the town,
- The city walls,
- A large water tank (Tekir ambarı) cut into the rock,
- An extensive necropolis of rock-cut tombs with inscriptions.
- Aya Tekla Church
- Silifke Museum
- Cyprus Memorial Forest in Silifke

Other notable sites outside the town are:

- The caves of "Heaven and Hell" ('Cennet ve Cehennem'), which have collapsed in two places revealing deep holes in the ground.
- Narlıkuyu is an attractive village, where people from Mersin come to eat fish and enjoy the seaside.
- Dana Island
- The archaeological sites Işıkkale, Karakabaklı, Gökkale, Meydan Castle, Sinekkale, Olba
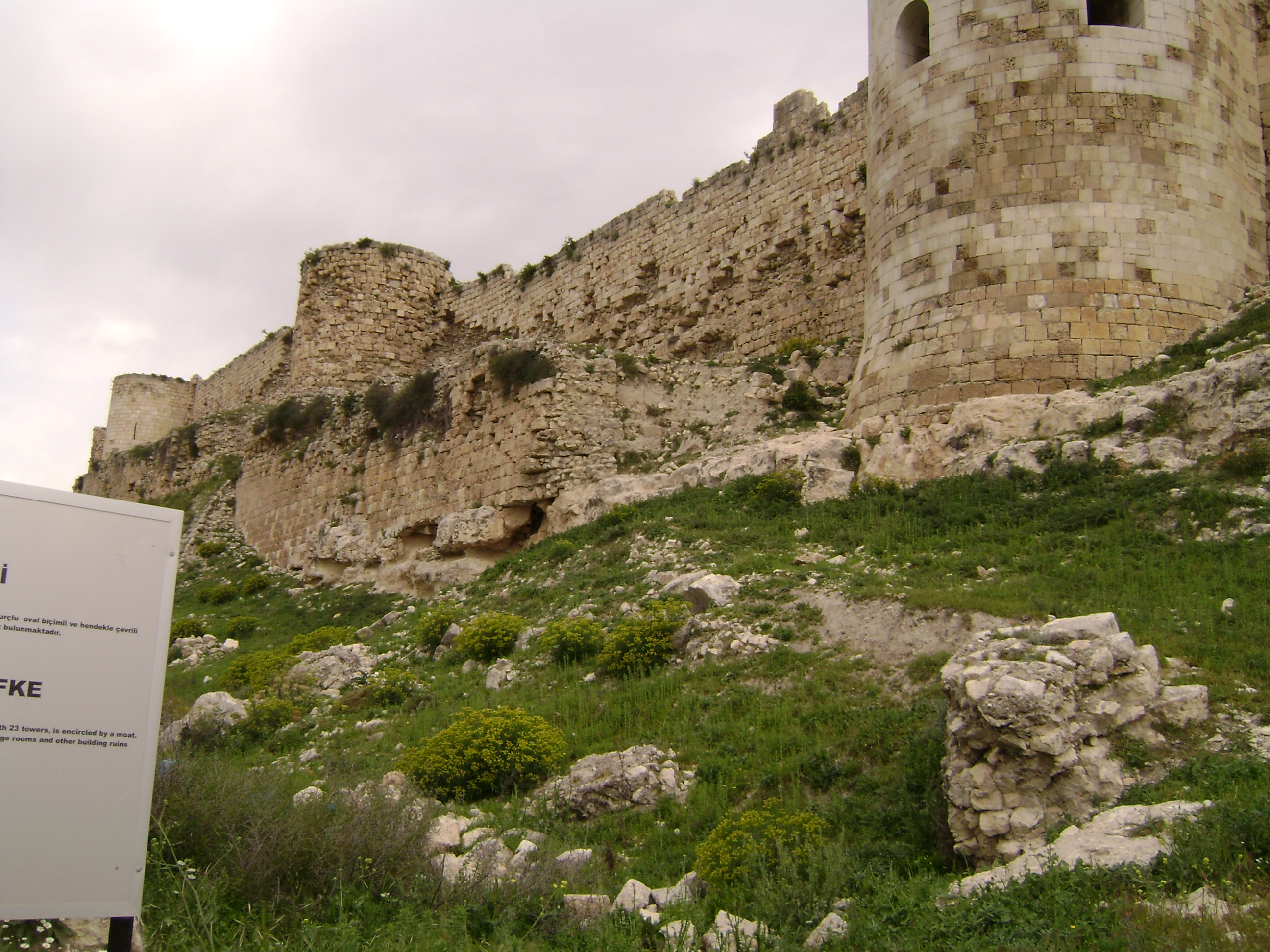
Outer walls of the castle of Silifke

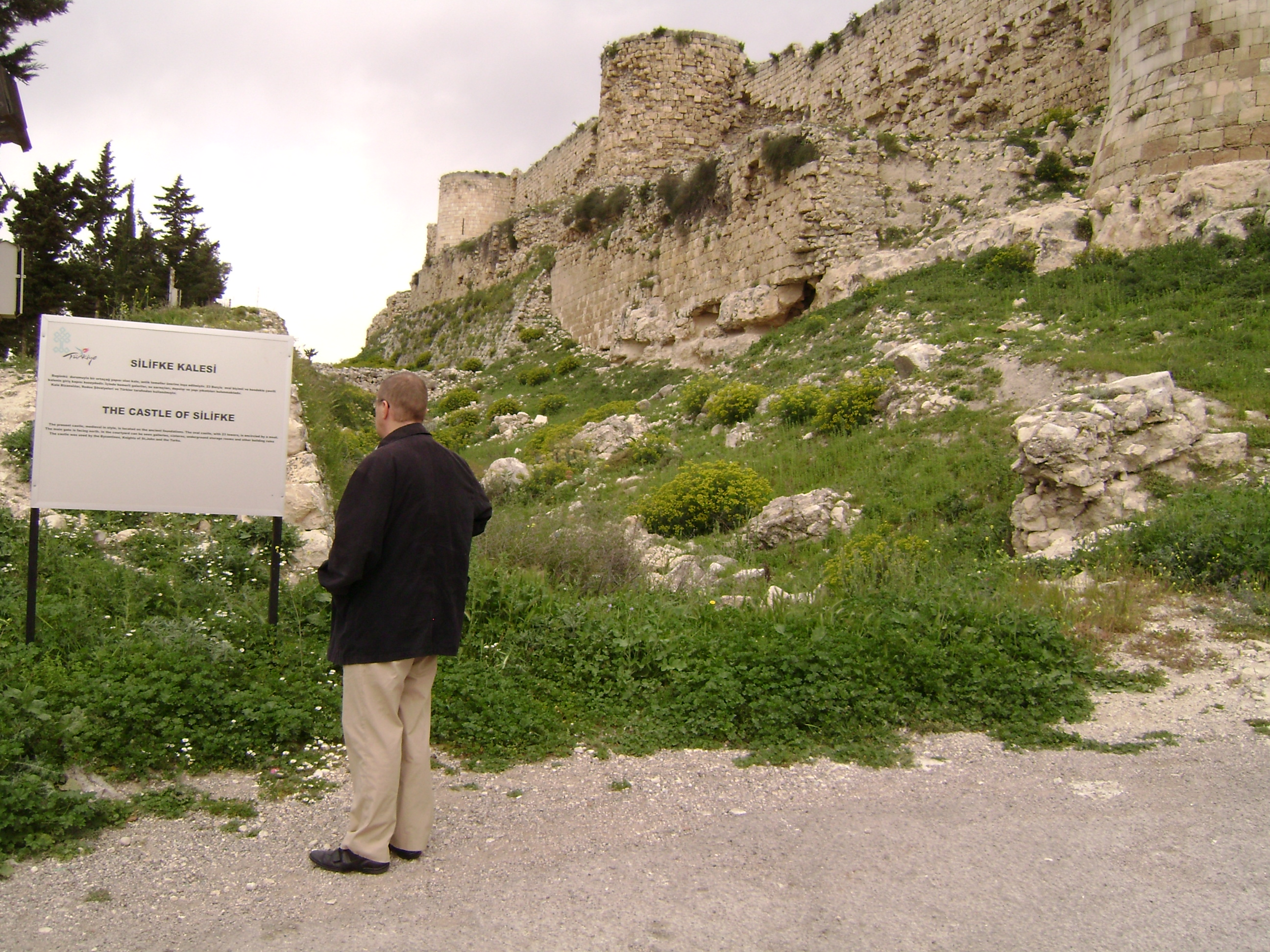
Silifke castle

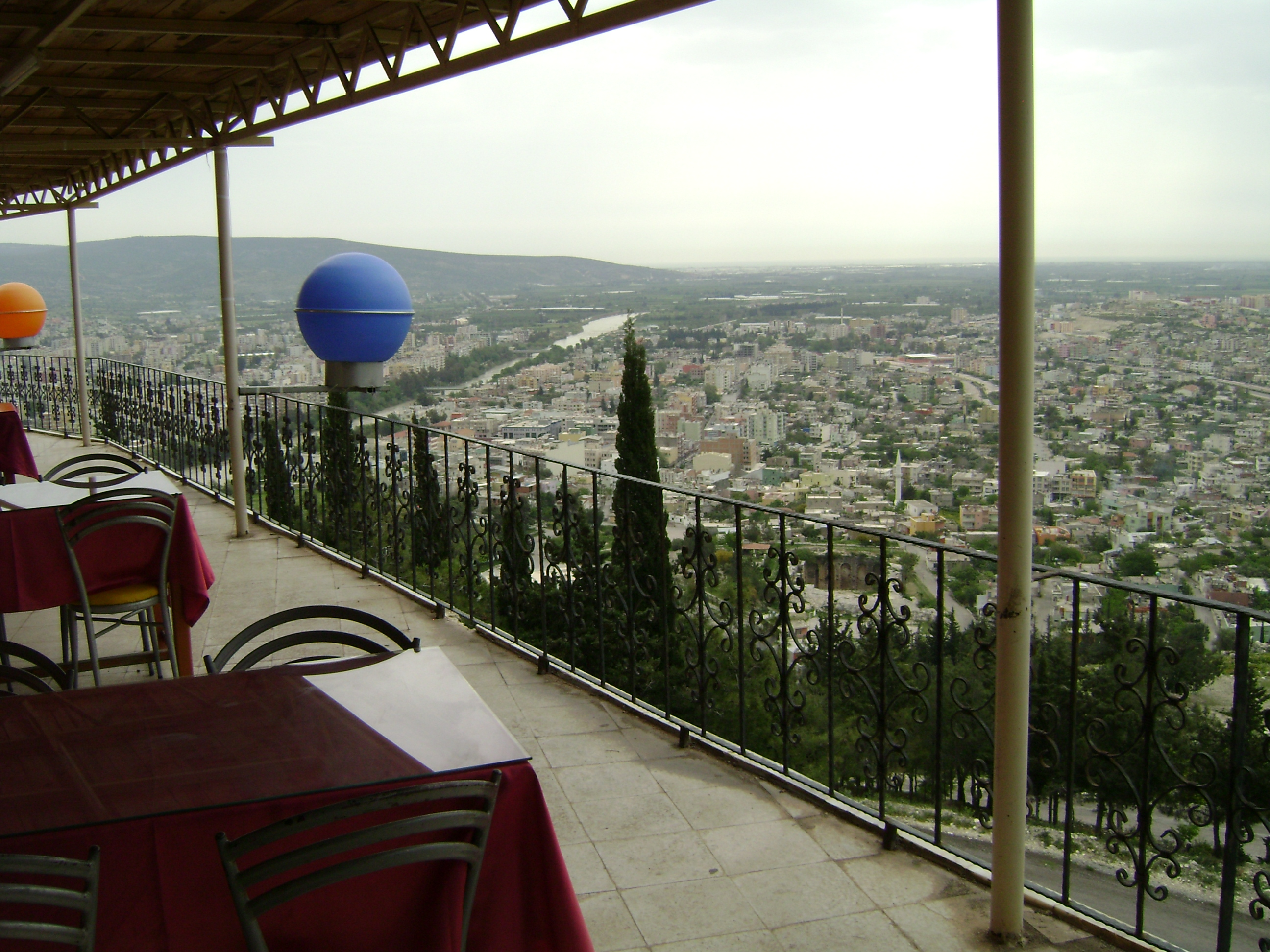
Bar next to the castle of Silifke

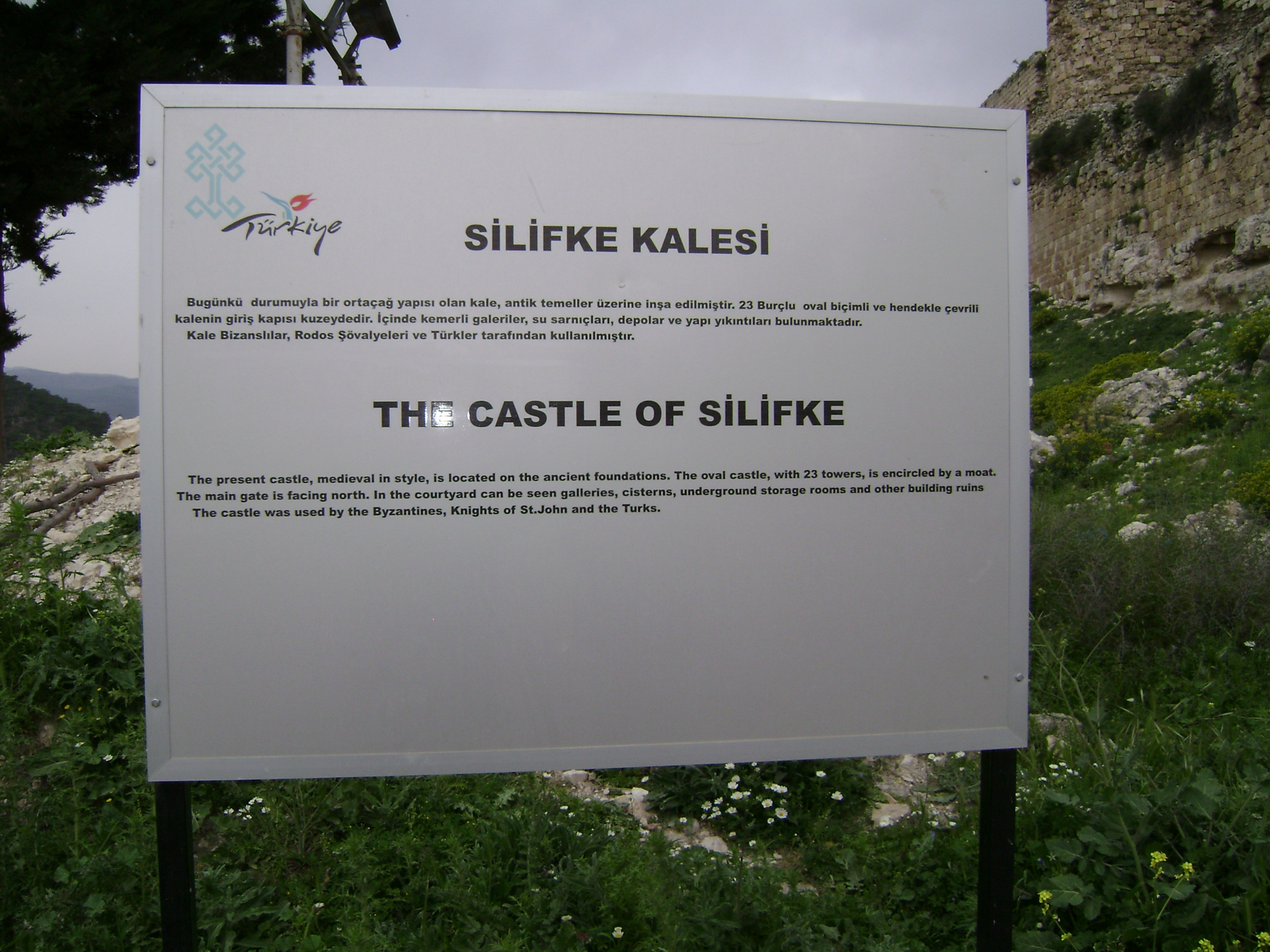
Touristic panel describing the castle of Silifke

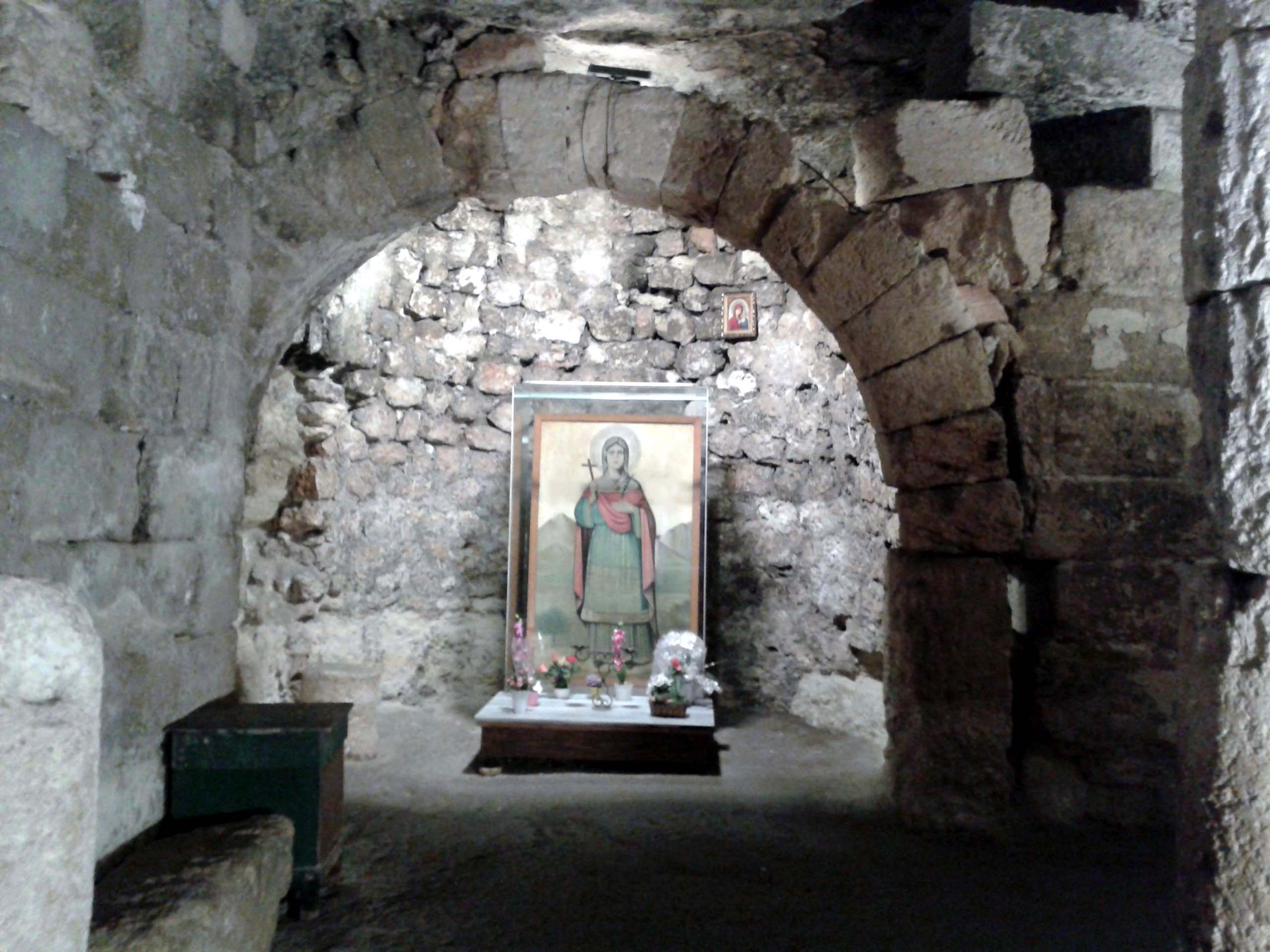
Aya Tekla Church

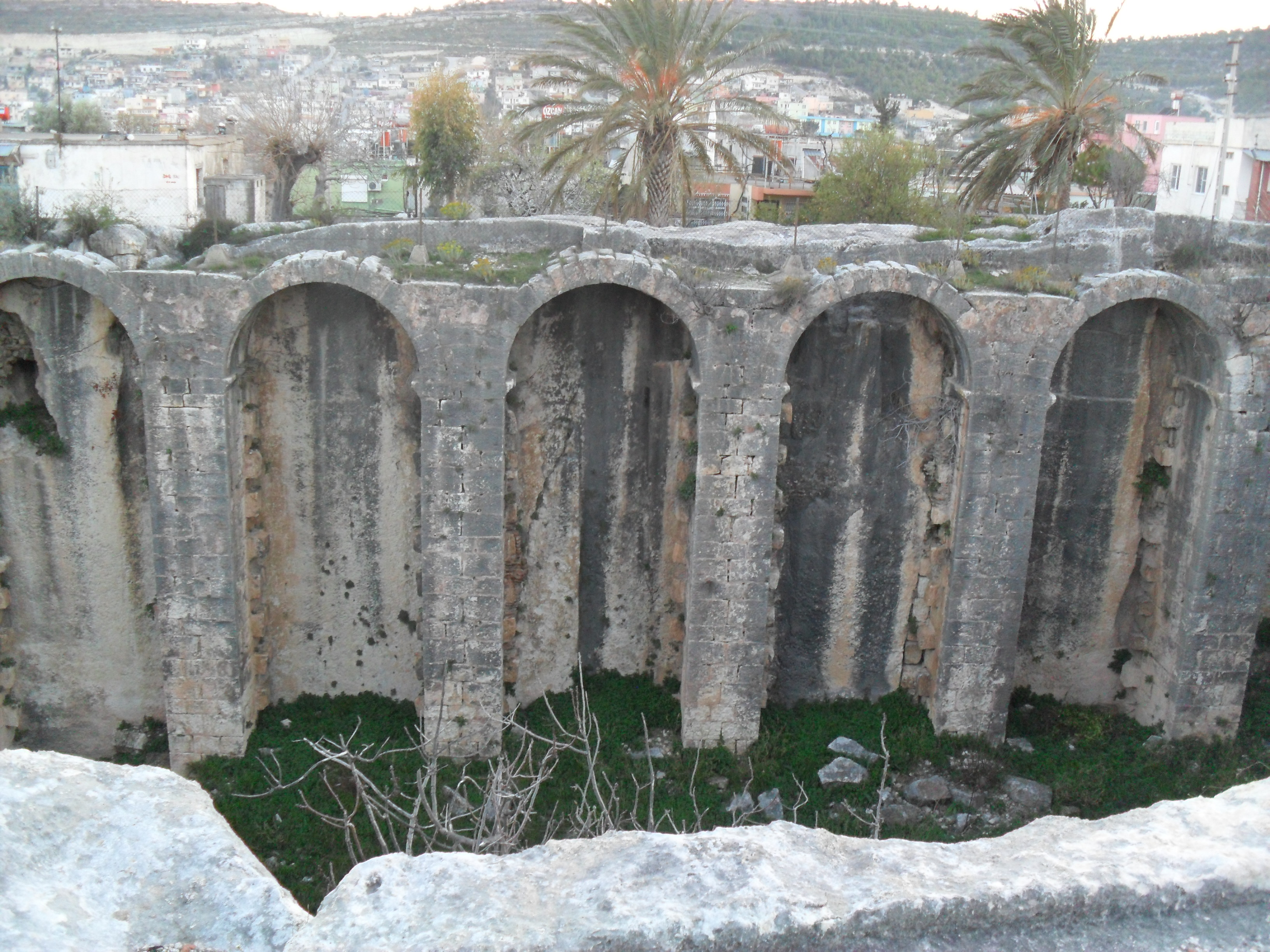
Tekir ambarı cistern

== Life and culture ==
The Turkmen community of Silifke has a strong tradition of folk music and dance including songs such as The Yogurt of Silifke (where the dancers imitate the actions of making yogurt) and another one where they wave wooden spoons about as they dance.

The cuisine includes breakfast of leaves of unleavened bread (bazlama) with a dry sour cottage cheese (çökelek) or fried meats. Many other dishes feature bulgur wheat. The annual Silifke Yoghurt Festival takes place in May.

== See also ==
- Other Seleucias
