= List of ports in Turkey =

This is a list of ports in Turkey grouped by sea and sorted after port name, wherein piers and special purpose terminals (oil, natural gas, LNG terminals) are separated. Marinas in Turkey are not listed here. As of 2024, there are 54 ports in Turkey.

== Ownership and operation ==
Ports and berthing facilities in Turkey are owned and operated by three different groups, state owned companies, municipalities and private companies.

Major ports are owned and operated by the Turkish State Railways (TCDD) or Turkish Maritime Organization (TDİ), which are so-called State Economic Enterprises (Turkish: Kamu İktisadi Teşebbüsü or KİT). However, some of these ports are already privatized and some others, which all belong to the TCDD, are within the ongoing privatization process.

Municipality owned ports are comparatively smaller. Limited to a small volume of coastal traffic, they serve the local needs of provincial towns.

Privately owned ports are mostly constructed and used in special purpose to the particular needs of the industrial plants. However, third parties are also allowed to use these ports.

Not a big portion of these ports have railway connections. Mainly the ones once or still owned by TCDD are connected to national railway network. Ports with railway connection are Limak Port Iskenderun, Mersin Port (Mediterranean Sea), Izmir Port, Nemport (Aegean Sea), Samsunport, TTK Zonguldak Port (Black Sea), Derince Port, Evyap Port, Haydarpasa Port, Port of Bandirma, Tekirdag Port, Yilport Yarimca (Marmara Sea). Also Isdemir, Tupras, Gubretas and Petrol Ofisi have their own ports which are connected to railway network.

Major ports in Turkey

== Black Sea ==
- Bartın
- Erdemir (aka Karadeniz Ereğli)
- Filyos (Zonguldak)
- Giresun
- Hopa
- Ordu
- Rize
- Samsun
- Tirebolu
- Trabzon
- Zonguldak TK

=== Piers ===
Bulancak Pier

=== Terminals ===
- Durusu Terminal, Samsun Province

== Turkish Straits and Sea of Marmara ==
- Alemdar, Dilovası
- Ambarlı, Istanbul Province
  - Akcansa Ambarli Port
  - Alemdar Port
  - Ambarli Armaport
  - Ambarli Mardas Port
  - Ambarli Soyak Port
- Bandırma
- Derince
- Diler, Hereke
- Gemport
- Haydarpaşa, Istanbul
- İstanbul
- Kumport
- Port of MartaşMartaş, Marmara Ereğlisi
- Sedef, Dilovası
- Tekirdağ (Akport)
- Zeytinburnu (aka Zeyport)

=== Piers ===
- Aksa (Akkim) Chemical Plant Pier, Yalova
- Aktaş Chemical Plant Pier, İzmit
- Altıntel Pier
- Bagfaş Piers, Bandırma
- Bortrans (Borusan) Pier, Gemlik
- BP Gemlik Pier, Gemlik
- Camar Installation Pier, İzmit
- Çanakkale Pier
- Çanakkale Cement (Akçansa) Pier, Çanakkale
- Çanakkale TDİ Piers, Çanakkale
- Çolakoğlu Metallurgy Pier
- Elyaf Plant Pier, Yalova
- Etibank Edincik Pier, Bandırma
- Gemlik Pier, Gemlik
- Gübretaş Fertilizer Pier, Yarımca
- İgsaş Fertilizer Complex Pier, İzmit
- Kızılkaya Pier, Dilovası
- Lafarge Aslan Cement Piers, Darıca
- Limaş Pursan Pier, İzmit
- MKS Dolphin Pier, Gemlik
- Mudanya Pier, Mudanya
- Nuh Cement Pier, Hereke
- POAŞ Pier, Çubuklu, Istanbul
- POAŞ-Shell Pier, Derince
- Poliport (Polisan) Pier, Dilovası
- Rota/Korfez Piers
- Tugsas (Nitro Factory) Pier, Gemlik
- Yarımca Piers, Yarımca

=== Terminals ===
- Aktaş Terminal, Derince
- Aygaz LPG Terminal, Yarımca
- Botaş Terminal, Marmara Ereğlisi
- Çekisan (Mobil-Shell-BP) Terminals, Haramidere, Istanbul Province
- Habas Terminal
- Marmara Botas LNG Terminal
- Petkim Terminal, Yarımca
- Solventaş Terminal, Dilovası
- Total Gebze Terminal, Gebze
- Total Haramidere Terminal, Haramidere, Istanbul
- Tüpraş Tütünçiftlik Refinery Terminal
- Zülfikarlar Molasses Terminal, Yarımca

== Aegean Sea ==
- Dikili
- Güllük
- İzmir

=== Piers ===
- Habaş Pier, Nemrut Bay
- Ege Fertilizer Pier, Nemrut Bay
- Limaş Pier, Nemrut Bay
- Nemtaş Pier, Nemrut Bay
- Seka Göcek Pier, Fethiye
- Çukurova Pier, Nemrut Bay

=== Terminals ===
- APM Terminals Izmir Aliağa Terminal
- Total Aliağa Izmir Terminal
- Tüpraş Aliağa Izmir Refinery Terminal

== Mediterranean Sea ==
- İskenderun
- Antalya
- Mersin
- İsdemir
- Taşucu Seka
- Assan (İskenderun)
- Yeşilovacık

=== Piers ===
- Ekinciler Pier, Iskenderun
- Sariseki Fertilizer Pier, Iskenderun
- Seka Mersin Pier
- Taşucu Pier
- Yazicilar Pier

=== Terminals ===
- Botaş Oil Terminal, Ceyhan
- Delta Terminal, Ceyhan
- Toros Fertilizer Terminal, Ceyhan

== See also ==
- Marinas in Turkey
- Ports of the Ottoman Empire
