= Kiphisos =

Town on the coast of ancient Cilicia

Coordinates: 36°11′28″N 33°39′27″E

Kiphisos was a town on the coast of ancient Cilicia, inhabited during Roman and Byzantine times.

Its site is located near Yeşilovacık in Asiatic Turkey.
