= Port of Tekirdag =

Tekirdag

Location
- Country: Turkey
- Location: Sea of Marmara
- Coordinates: 40.964°N 27.507°E
- UN/LOCODE: TRTEK

Details
- Operated by: Ceyport Tekirdag; Cey Holding
- Land area: 261,542 m2
- No. of berths: 12
- Draft depth: 18.0 metres (59.1 ft)

Statistics
- Annual container volume: 2,032,700 (2024)
- Website; Official website

The Port of Tekirdag is a private port facility serving the city of Tekirdağ and its hinterland, that is located on the north shore of the Sea of Marmara, 125 km. west of Istanbul. Primarily a dry cargo port, Tekirdag handles breakbulk, Ro-Ro, dry bulk and containers. In 2024, it was the 15th busiest container port in Europe.

== History ==
=== Early and Ottoman era development ===
The port at Tekirdag has long served as the maritime outlet for East Thrace, before its relative decline in the late 19th century spurred by the construction of a railway line linking the easternmost port before the Dardanelles — Alexandroupolis (in modern day Eastern Macedonia and Thrace of Greece) to Istanbul.

Concurrently, local authorities sought to expand and modernize the port to integrate it into Ottoman imperial trade networks, enhancing the port’s capacity and status, aiming to make it one of the busiest ports in Rumelia and the Balkans. During the Tanzimat, improvements to piers, quay structures, and harbor works were proposed to grow the commercial traffic.

=== 20th century ===
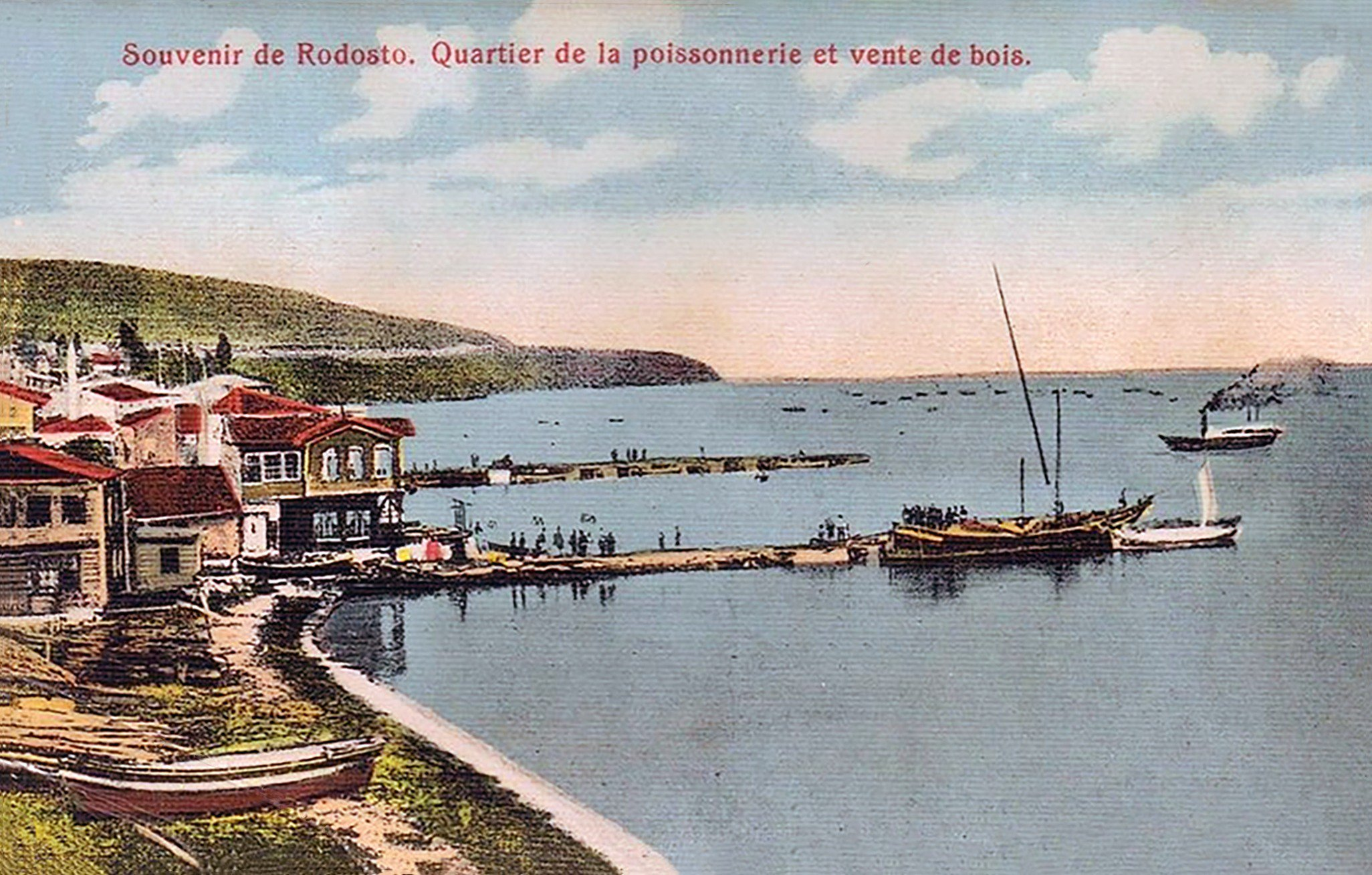
Image of the port sometime before World War I

During the Armistice and National Struggle (1918–1923), the port remained a transit and logistical hub for trade and military transport.

From 1973 until October 1984, Tekirdag functioned as a branch under the Istanbul Port Authority. Under the name TDİ Tekirdağ Port, the facility remained under state oversight until the privatization wave of the 1990s. In 1997 the port was privatized for a 30-year operating rights concession, awarded to Akport Tekirdağ Liman İşletmeleri A.Ş.

=== Recent developments and modernization ===
The concession agreement was terminated by the Privatization High Council in 2012, returning control to Turkish Maritime Enterprises.

In 2013, the company Ceynak began operating port services under a contract with TDİ, and in 2018, Ceynak won the formal privatization tender, rebranding the port as Ceyport Tekirdağ Uluslararası Liman İşletmeciliği A.Ş. Since December 2018, the port has been operated by Ceyport Tekirdağ.

The port was privatised in 2019, with Ceyport Tekirdag being the new operating company. The European Bank of Reconstruction and Development (EBRD) provided a US$17,500,000 loan, which was matched by a Turkish bank loan.

Under Ceyport’s management, the port has emphasized intermodal connectivity and infrastructure upgrades. The operator describes it as the largest intermodal port in the Marmara Region, with a rail connection serving a broad hinterland. The port operates multiple cranes (up to 100 ton capacity) along with reach stackers and rail access. It also serves wagon traffic through the Tekirdag–Derince train ferry link.

== Cargo facilities ==
The total port area is 261,542 m^{2} with 20 enclosed warehouses (24,601 m^{2}), six silos (30,000 t capacity), and liquid tank storage of 69,750 m^{3}. The quay length is about 2,930 m.
