= Cape Tisan =

Headland on the Mediterranean Sea coast of Mersin Province, Turkey

Coordinates: 36°08′N 33°41′E

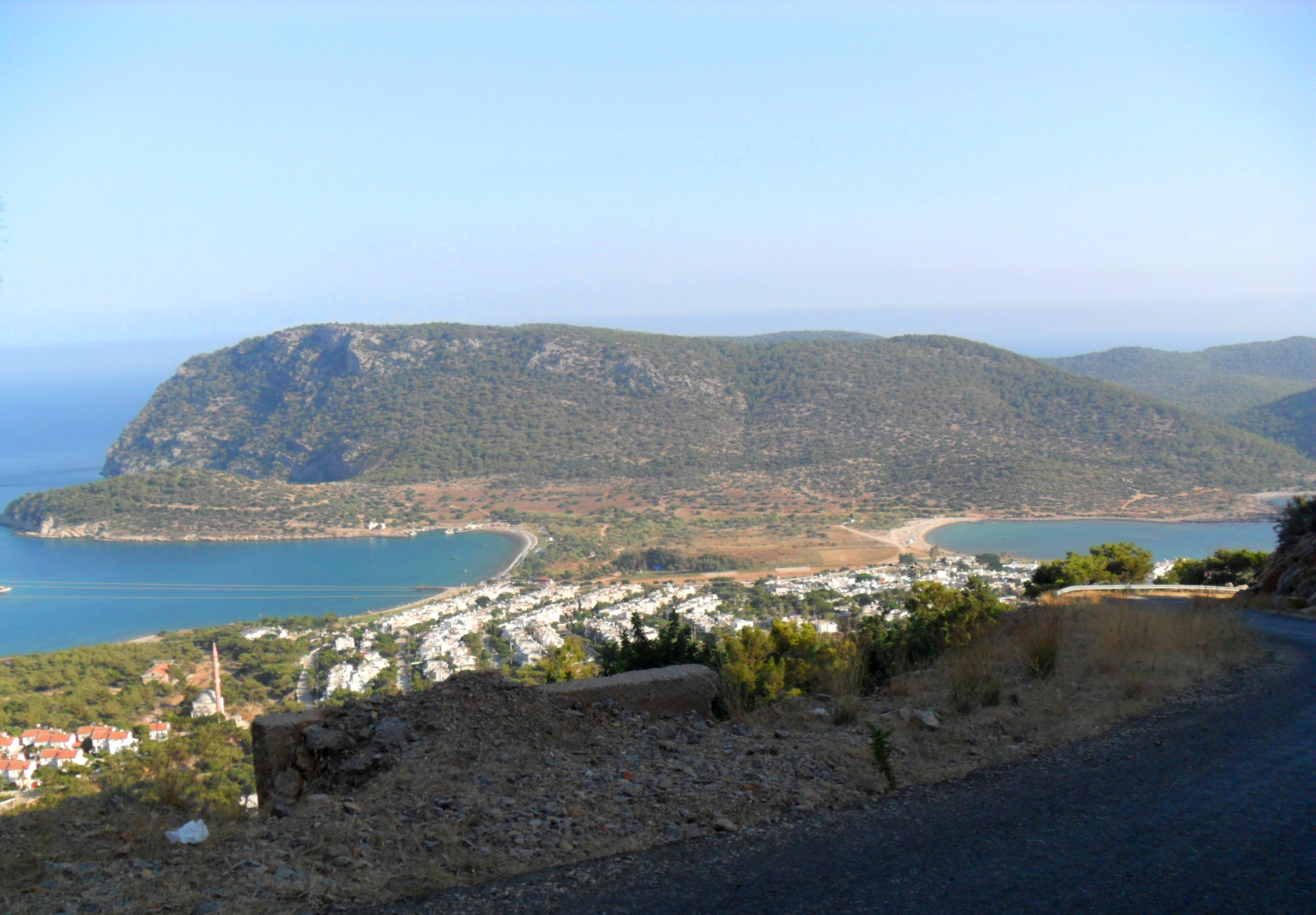
Cape Tisan from the north

Cape Tisan is a headland on the Mediterranean Sea coast of Mersin Province, Turkey. Τhe name is a clipping of the Greek Ἀφροδισιᾶν (Aphrodisian), which is the accusative form of Ἀφροδίσιας (Aphrodisias) – it is common for Turkish place names of Greek origin to derive from accusative forms.

== Geography ==
The cape is near to Yeşilovacık town in Silifke district of Mersin Province. The distance to Silifke is 52 kilometres (32 mi) and to Mersin is 135 kilometres (84 mi).

== The cape and the surrounding ==
The cape is actually the southernmost point of a circular spit of roughly 2.5 kilometres (1.6 mi) diameter connected to the mainland by an isthmus. The spit is famous for being home to Aphrodisias of Cilicia and the isthmus has a pair of bays one in each side. In the Middle Ages the east bay was named Limni Aphrodisias and the west bay was named Limni Etheros. Modern popular names are Cleopatra's bay for the east bay and Pirates' bay (Turkish: Korsan koyu) for the west bay. Both bays are popular beaches and in fact the cape is named after a site of marine resorts just north of the isthmus. However owing to dominant lodos winds of the Mediterranean coast, the Pirates' bay is not as sheltered as the Cleopatra's bay.
