= Yeşilovacık Fishing Port =

Fishing port in Turkey

Yeşilovacık Port
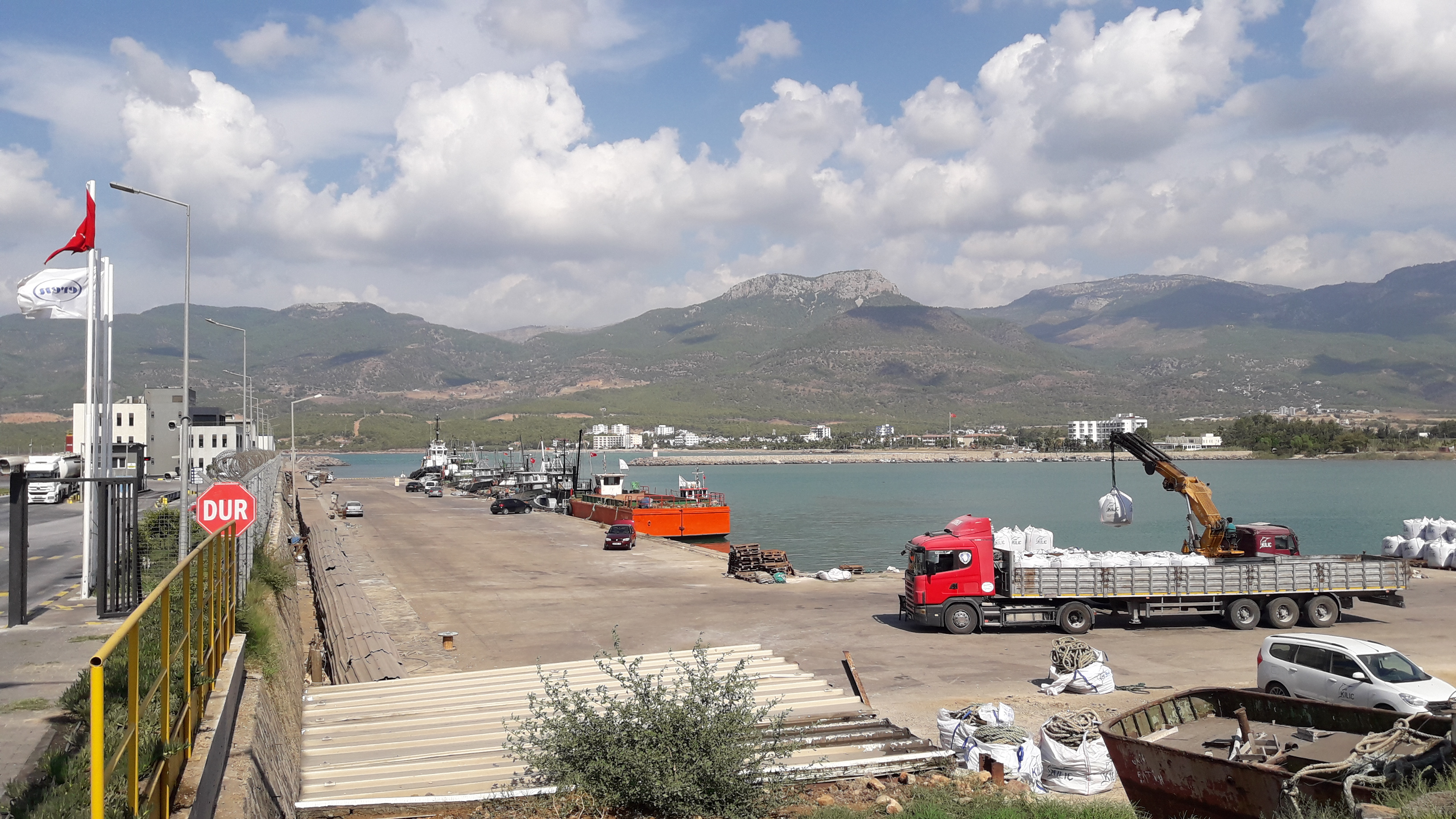
- Yeşilovacık harbor
- Interactive map of Yeşilovacık Port

Location
- Country: Turkey
- Location: Yeşilovacık, Silifke, Mersin
- Coordinates: 36°11′06″N 33°39′37″E

Details
- Opened: 1997
- Type of harbour: Fishing

Yeşilovacık Fishing Port is a small port in the town of Yeşilovacık, Turkey.

The economy of Yeşilovacık is partially based on fishing. It is a part of Silifke ilçe (district) of Mersin Province at 36°11′06″N 33°39′37″E. The 250-small boat capacity harbor was constructed in 1997. It is situated to the east of a small bay named Ovacık Bay, north of the ancient site Aphrodisias of Cilicia and the south of the town. The length of the breakwater (against south west) is 525 metres (1,722 ft). It is equipped by a harbor launch for small vessels.

In 2015 a cement silo was added to the harbor infrastructure. Presently the harbor is used mainly to import cement to supply the neighbor Akkuyu Nuclear Power Plant construction.
