= Economic history of the Ottoman Empire =

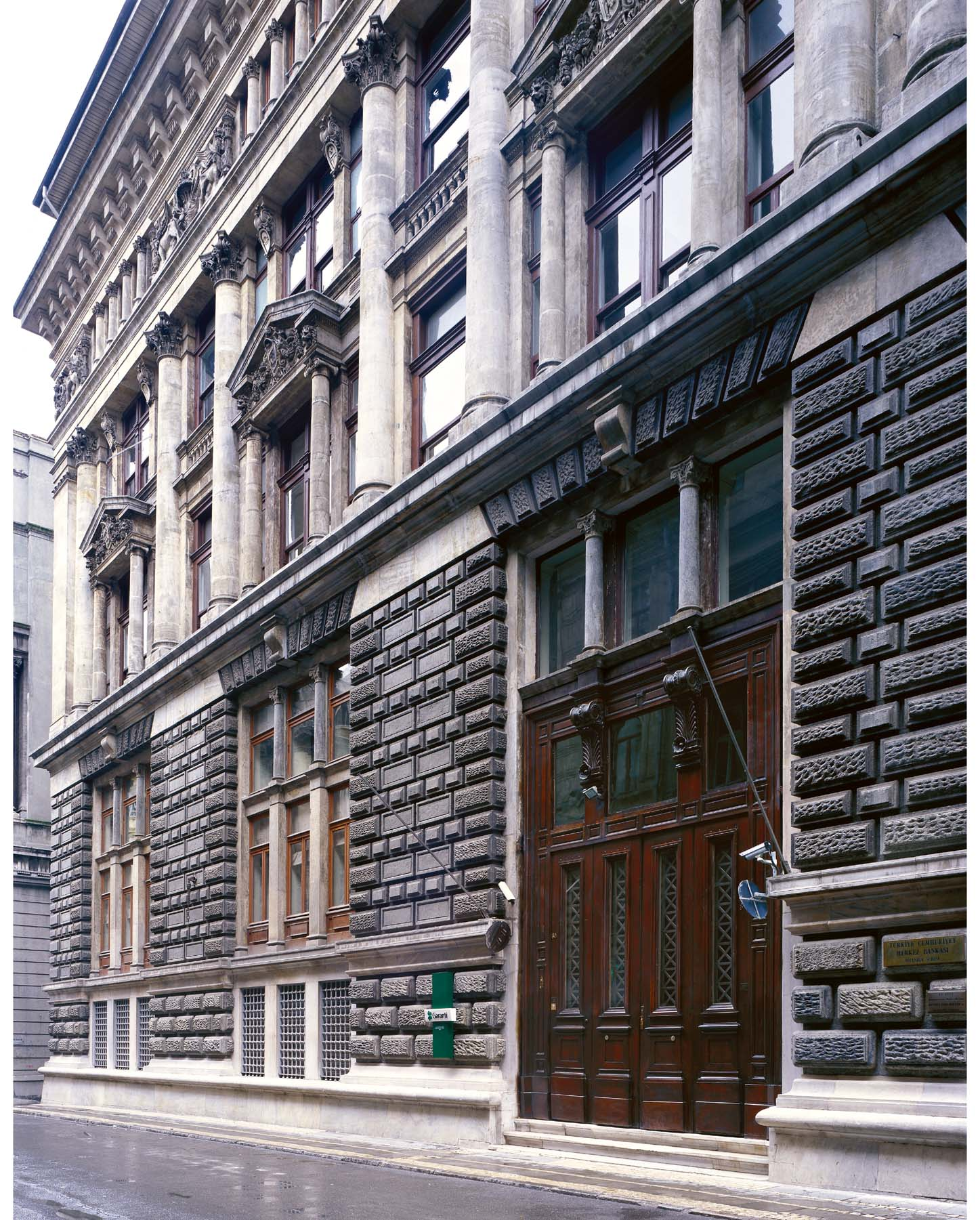
The Ottoman Bank was founded in 1856 in Istanbul.

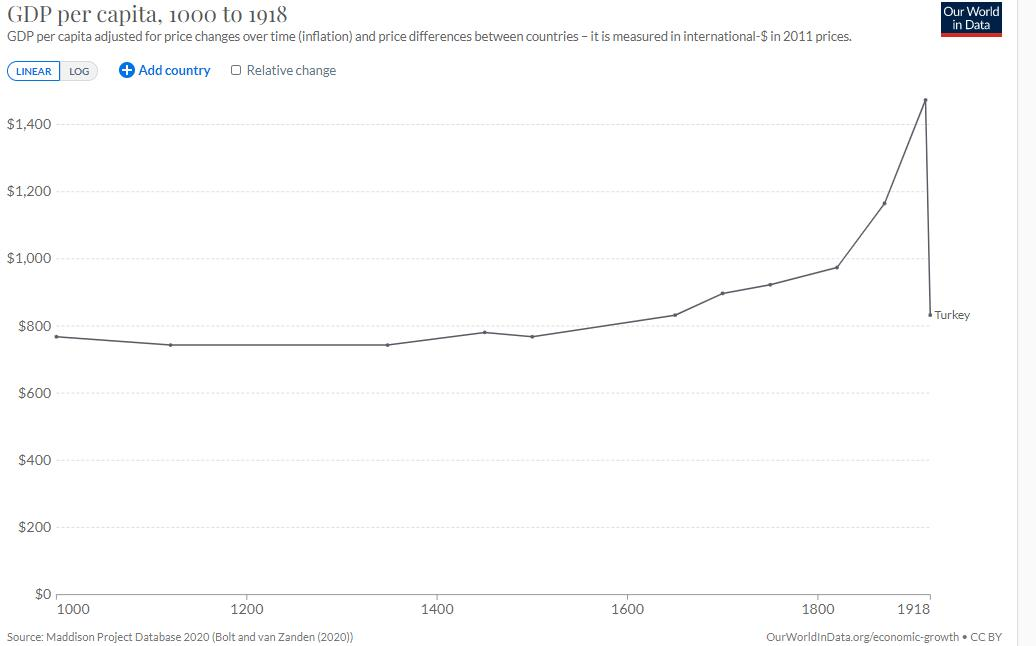
Real GDP per capita in Turkey, 1400 to 1918

The economic history of the Ottoman Empire covers the period 1299–1923. Trade, agriculture, transportation, and religion made up the Ottoman Empire's economy.

The Ottomans saw military expansion of currency, more emphasis on manufacturing and industry in the wealth-power-wealth equation, and moving towards capitalist economics comprising expanding industries and markets. They continued along the trajectory of territorial expansion, traditional monopolies, buildings, and agriculture. (Note: In economic terms, neither the Marxian Asiatic mode of production nor the feudal mode found in medieval Europe reflect the Ottoman economy accurately, as it falls somewhere in between the two - excess peasant production was taxed by the state as opposed to it being paid in rent to feudal lords.)

== Transportation ==
=== 16th, 17th, and 18th centuries ===
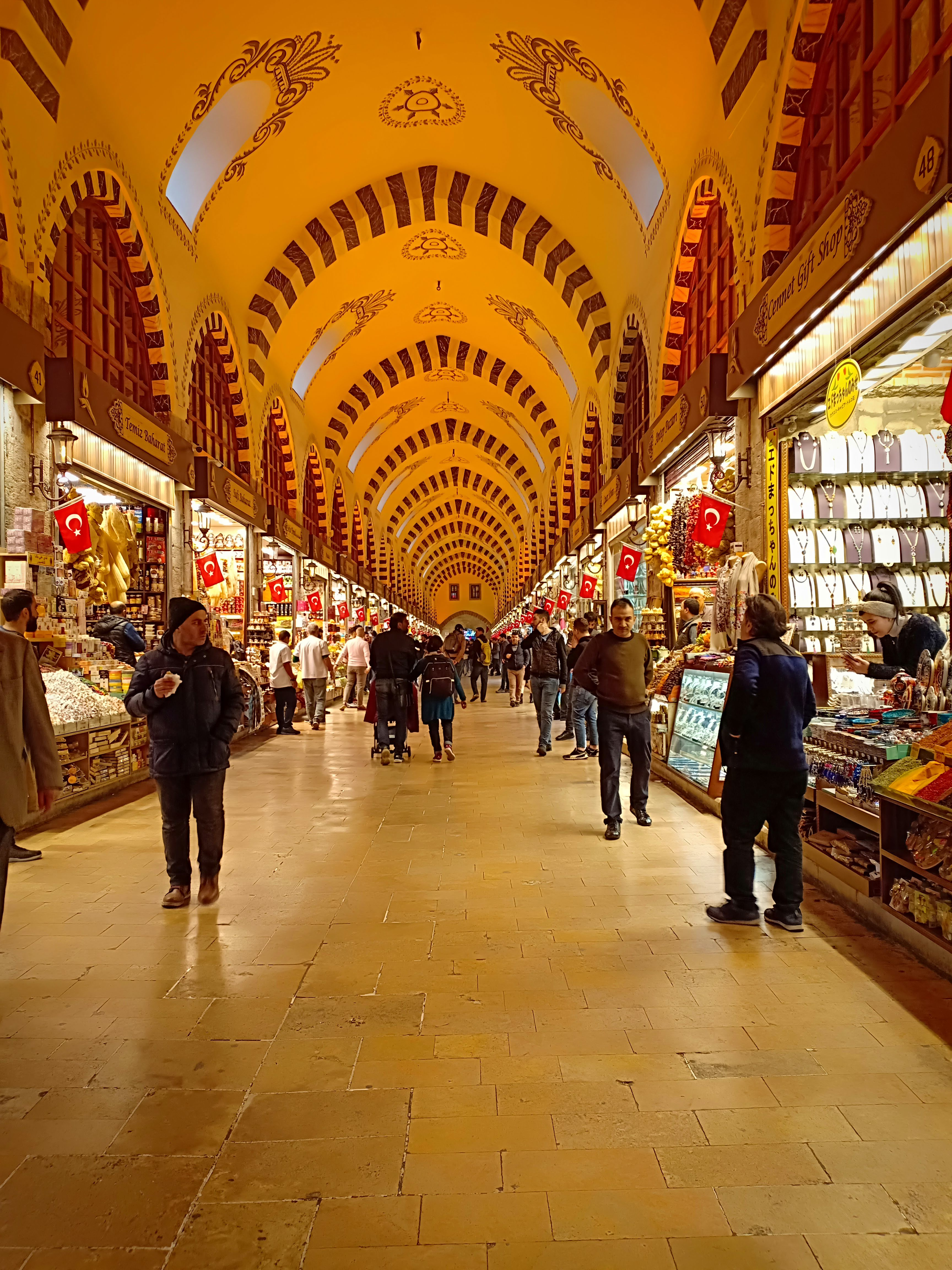
The Spice Bazaar got its name "Egyptian Bazaar" (Turkish: Mısır Çarşısı) because it was built with the revenues from the Ottoman eyalet of Egypt in 1660.

Trade has always been an important aspect of an economy. It was no different in the 17th century. As the Ottoman Empire expanded, it started gaining control of important trade routes. The capture of Constantinople (1453) to the Ottoman Turks was a key event. Along with their victory, they now had significant control of the Silk Road, which European countries used to trade with Asia. While many sources state that the Ottoman Empire “blocked” the Silk Road by increasing taxes, this is not supported by any larger body of historical research. In fact, there was no general decline in spice imports to Europe after 1453 because Constantinople was not a major trade route in the spice trade, and most trade instead came from Alexandria or Beirut. The only large change in the price of spice occurred much later in 1499 with the start of the Second Ottoman–Venetian War. Due to this lack of change, it is likely that there was no discernible blocking of the spice trade by the Ottoman Empire during this period. Instead, European explorers simply searched for alternate trade routes to supplement their existing trade and make it more profitable.

Ottoman tariff rates
Mehmed II

Religion	Tariff rate
Muslim	4%
Non-Muslim	4%
Foreigners	5%

Beyazid II

Religion	Tariff rate
Muslim	1% or 2%
Non-Muslim	2% or 4%
Foreigners	4% or 5%

Selim I

Religion	Tariff rate
Muslim	2%
Non-Muslim	4%
Foreigners	5%

The quality of both land and sea transport was driven primarily by the efforts of the Ottoman administration over this time. As a result, the quality of transport infrastructure varied significantly over time depending on the current administration's efficacy. The story of transport in the empire should not be seen as one of continual improvement. Indeed, the road infrastructure was significantly better in the 16th century than it was in the 18th century.

==== Land ====
The Ottomans inherited a network of caravanserai from the Selçuk Turks who preceded them. The administration and tax-gathering of the empire mandated an interest in ensuring the safety of couriers and convoys and (by extension) of merchant caravans. The caravanserai network extended into the Balkans and provided safe lodgings for merchants and their animals.

The Jelali revolts of the 16th and 17th centuries did much to disrupt the land-transport network in Anatolia. The empire could no longer ensure the safety of merchants who then had to negotiate safe passage with the local leader of the area they were traveling through. Only in the 18th century with concerted efforts to improve the safety of the caravanserai network and the reorganization of a corps of pass-guards did land transport in Anatolia improve.

==== Sea ====
The empire did not take an active interest in sea trade, preferring a free-market system from which they could draw a tax revenue. However, such laissez-faire policies were not always followed. For example, under Hadim Suleyman Pasha's tenure as Grand Vizier until 1544, the Ottoman administration was directly involved in the spice trade to increase revenue. However, such policies were often repealed by their successors.

The main areas of maritime activity were: the Aegean and Eastern Mediterranean (main trade: wheat); the Red Sea and Persian Gulf (main trade: spices); the Black Sea (main trade: wheat and lumber); and the Western Mediterranean.

In 2020, archaeologists discovered the shipwreck of a massive Ottoman merchant ship in the Mediterranean thought to have sunk in 1630 CE en route from Egypt to Constantinople. The ship was 43 meters in length and had burden of 1,000 tons, and was transporting wares including Ming-dynasty Chinese porcelain, painted ceramics from Italy, Indian peppercorns, coffee pots, clay tobacco pipes and Arabian incense. The nature of this cargo and the vast size of the vessel are indicative of the activity of Red Sea-Indian Ocean-Mediterranean trade routes during the Ottoman period.

=== 19th century ===
During the 19th century, new technologies radically transformed both travel and communications. Through the invention of the steam engine in Britain, water and land transport revolutionized the conduct of trade and commerce. The steamship meant journeys became predictable, times shrank and large volumes of goods could be carried more cheaply. Quataert cites the Istanbul-Venice route, the main trade artery, taking anything from fifteen to eighty-one days by sail ship, was reduced to ten days by the steamship. Sail ships would carry 50 to 100 tonnes. In contrast, steamships could now carry 1,000 tonnes. (Note: Comparatively large ships like the Titanic could carry 66,000 tonnes.)

With the advent of the steamship formerly untraversable routes opened up. Rivers that carried cargoes only in one direction could now be traversed both ways bringing innumerable benefits to certain regions. New routes like the Suez Canal were created, prompted by steamships, changing trade demographics across the Near East as trade was rerouted. Quataert's research shows that the volume of trade began to rise over the 19th century. By 1900 sailboats accounted for just 5 percent of ships visiting Istanbul. However, this 5 percent was greater in number than any year of the 19th century. In 1873 Istanbul handled 4.5 million tons of shipping, growing to 10 million tons by 1900. The development of larger ships accelerated the growth of port cities with deep harbors to accommodate them. Europeans however owned 0 percent of commercial shipping operating in Ottoman waters. Not all regions benefited from steamships as rerouting meant trade from Iran, Iraq and Arabia now did not need to go through Istanbul, Aleppo, and even Beirut, leading to losses in these territories.

In terms of transport, the Ottoman world could be split into two main regions. The European provinces connected by wheeled transport and the non-wheeled transport of Anatolia and the Arab world. Railroads revolutionized land transport profoundly, cutting journey times drastically promoting population movements and changing rural-urban relations. Railroads offered cheap and regular transport for bulk goods, allowing for the first time the potential of fertile interior regions to be exploited. When railroads were built near these regions agriculture developed rapidly with hundreds of thousands of tons of cereals being shipped in this way. Railroads had additional benefits for non-commercial passengers who began using them. 8 million passengers using the 1,054-mile Balkan lines and 7 million using the Anatolian 1,488 miles. Railroads also created a new source of employment for over 13,000 workers by 1911. With low population densities and lack of capital, the Ottomans did not develop extensive railroad or shipping industries. Most of the capital for railroads came from European financiers, which gave them considerable financial control.

Older forms of transport did not disappear with the arrival of steam. The businesses and animals used previously to transport goods between regions found new work in moving goods to and from trunk lines. The Aegean areas alone had over 10,000 camels working to supply local railroads. Ankara station had a thousand camels at a time waiting to unload goods. Furthermore, additional territories traversed by railroads encouraged development and improved agriculture. Like sailing vessels, land transport contributed to and invigorated trade and commerce across the empire.

== Agriculture ==
The Ottoman Empire was an agrarian economy that was land rich but labor scarce and capital-poor. The majority of the population earned their living from small family holdings. This contributed to around 40 percent of taxes for the empire directly as well as indirectly through customs revenues on exports.

Economic historians have long tried to determine how agricultural productivity has varied over time and between societies. The magnitude of variations in productivity is often at the core of such important historical debates as to whether there was an agricultural revolution, when and where it happened, and how the standard of living has varied among societies. Identifying the variations in productivity is also required to be able to determine the divergence of incomes and reversals of fortune in history and to examine the effects of climate, resources, technology, and institutions on productivity.

Cultivator families drew their livelihoods from a complex set of different economic activities and not merely from growing crops. This included growing a variety of crops for their consumption as well as rearing animals for their milk and wool. Some rural families manufactured goods for sale to others, for instance, Balkan villagers traveled to Anatolia and Syria for months to sell their wool cloth. (Note: İslamoğlu-İnan's study of Anatolia from the seventeenth century finds state policy by way of taxation and inheritance laws encouraged peasants to commercially develop fruits, vegetables and sheep.) This pattern established for the 18th century had not significantly changed at the beginning of the 20th century. That is not to say that there were no changes in the agrarian sector. Nomads played an important role in the economy, providing animal products, textiles, and transportation. They were troublesome for the state and hard to control – sedentarization programs took place in the 19th century, coinciding with huge influxes of refugees. This dynamic had the effect of a decline in animal rearing by tribes and an increase in cultivation. The rising commercialization of agriculture commencing in the 18th century meant more people began to grow more. With increased urbanization, new markets created greater demand, easily met with the advent of railroads. State policy requiring a greater portion of taxes to be paid in cash influenced the increased production. Finally, increased demand for consumer goods themselves drove an increase in production to pay for the same.

Quataert argues production rose due to some factors. An increase in productivity resulted from irrigation projects, intensive agriculture and integration of modern agricultural tools increasing in use throughout the 19th century. By 1900, tens of thousands of plows, reapers and other agricultural technologies such as combines were found across the Balkan, Anatolian and Arab lands. However, most of the increases in production came from vast areas of land coming under further cultivation. Families began increasing the amount of time at work, bringing fallow land into use. Sharecropping increased utilizing land that had been for animal pasturage. Along with state policy, millions of refugees brought vast tracts of untilled land into production. The empty central Anatolian basin and steppe zone in the Syrian provinces were instances where government agencies gave out smallholdings of land to refugees. This was a recurring pattern across the empire, small landholdings the norm. Foreign holdings remained unusual despite Ottoman political weakness – probably due to strong local and notable resistance and labor shortages. Issawi et al. have argued that division of labor was not possible, is based on religious grounds. İnalcık, however, demonstrates that the division of labor was historically determined and open to change. Agricultural reform programs in the late 19th century saw the state founding agricultural schools, model farms, and education of a self-perpetuating bureaucracy of agrarian specialists focused on increasing agricultural exports. Between 1876 and 1908, the value of agricultural exports just from Anatolia rose by 45 percent whilst tithe proceeds rose by 79 percent.

However, cheap American grain imports undermined agricultural economies across Europe in some cases causing outright economic and political crises.

== Manufacturing ==
=== Medieval period ===
No formal system had emerged to organize manufacturing in medieval Anatolia. The closest such organization that can be identified is the Ahi Brotherhood, a religious organization that followed the Sufi tradition of Islam during the 13th and 14th centuries. Most of the members were merchants and craftsmen and viewed taking pride in their work as part and parcel of their adherence to Islam. However, the organization was not professional and should not be confused with the professional guilds that emerge later.

=== Emergence of the guilds ===
It is not clear when or how various guilds emerged. What is known for sure is that by 1580 guilds had become a well-established aspect of contemporary Ottoman society. This is evidenced by the Surname of 1582 which was a description of the procession to celebrate the circumcision of Murad III's son Mehmed. The guilds were organizations that were responsible for the maintenance of standards.

=== Late 18th century onwards ===
Whilst looking at Ottoman manufacture, a significant area of technology transfer, Quataert argues one must not only look at large factories but also the small workshops: “One will find then find that Ottoman industry was not a “dying, unadaptive, unevolving sector...[but] vital, creative, evolving and diverse”.

Over the 19th century, a shift occurred to rural female labor with guild organized urban-based male labor less important. The global markets for Ottoman goods fell somewhat with certain sectors expanding. However, any changes were compensated by an increase in domestic consumption and demand. Mechanized production even at its peak remained an insignificant portion of total output. The lack of capital, as in other areas of the economy, deterred the mechanization of production. Nonetheless, some factories did emerge in Istanbul, Ottoman Europe, and Anatolia. In the 1830s steam-powered silk-reeling factories emerged in Salonica, Edirne, West Anatolia and Lebanon.

Under the late 18th century fine textiles, hand-made yarns and leathers were in high demand outside the empire. However, these declined by the early 19th century and half a century later production for export re-emerged in the form of raw silk and oriental carpets. The two industries alone employed 100,000 persons in 1914 two-thirds in carpet-making for European and American buyers. Most workers were women and girls, receiving wages that were amongst the lowest in the manufacturing sector. Much of the manufacturing shifted to the urban areas during the 18th century, to benefit from the lower rural costs and wages.

Guilds operating before the 18th century did see a decline through the 18th and 19th centuries. Guilds provided some form of security in prices, restricting production and controlling quality and provided support to members who hit hard times. However, with market forces driving down prices their importance declined, and with the Janissaries as their backers, being disbanded by Mahmud II in 1826, their fate was sealed.

By far the majority of producers targeted the 26 million domestic consumers who often lived in adjacent provinces to the producer. Analyzing these producers is difficult, as they did not belong to organizations that left records.

Manufacturing through the period 1600–1914 witnessed remarkable continuities in the loci of manufacturing; industrial centers flourishing in the 17th century were often still active in 1914. Manufacturing initially struggled against Asian and then European competition in the 18th and 19th centuries whereby handicraft industries were displaced by cheaper industrially produced imports. (Note: Quataert's study of the Istanbul port workers and their struggle over two decades against the European companies with indirect support from the state highlights the difference between colonial administrators elsewhere and the Ottoman government.) However, manufacturing achieved surprising output levels, with the decline of some industries being more than compensated by the rise of new industries. The decline of handicrafts production saw a shift of output move to agricultural commodity production and other manufacturing output. (Note: For instance, silk reel production from the Levant emerged in the nineteenth century, as did the production of raw silks and carpets.)

=== 19th century ===
Throughout the 19th century, Egypt was effectively independent of the empire and had a much more advanced economy. Its per-capita income comparable to that of France, and higher than the overall average income of Eastern Europe and Japan. Economic historian Jean Barou estimated that, in terms of 1960 dollars, Egypt in 1800 had a per-capita income of $232 ($1,025 in 1990 dollars). In comparison, per-capita income in terms of 1960 dollars for France in 1800 was $240 ($1,060 in 1990 dollars), for Eastern Europe in 1800 was $177 ($782 in 1990 dollars), and for Japan in 1800 was $180 ($795 in 1990 dollars). In addition to Egypt, other parts of the Ottoman Empire, particularly Syria and southeastern Anatolia, also had a highly productive manufacturing sector that was evolving in the 19th century.

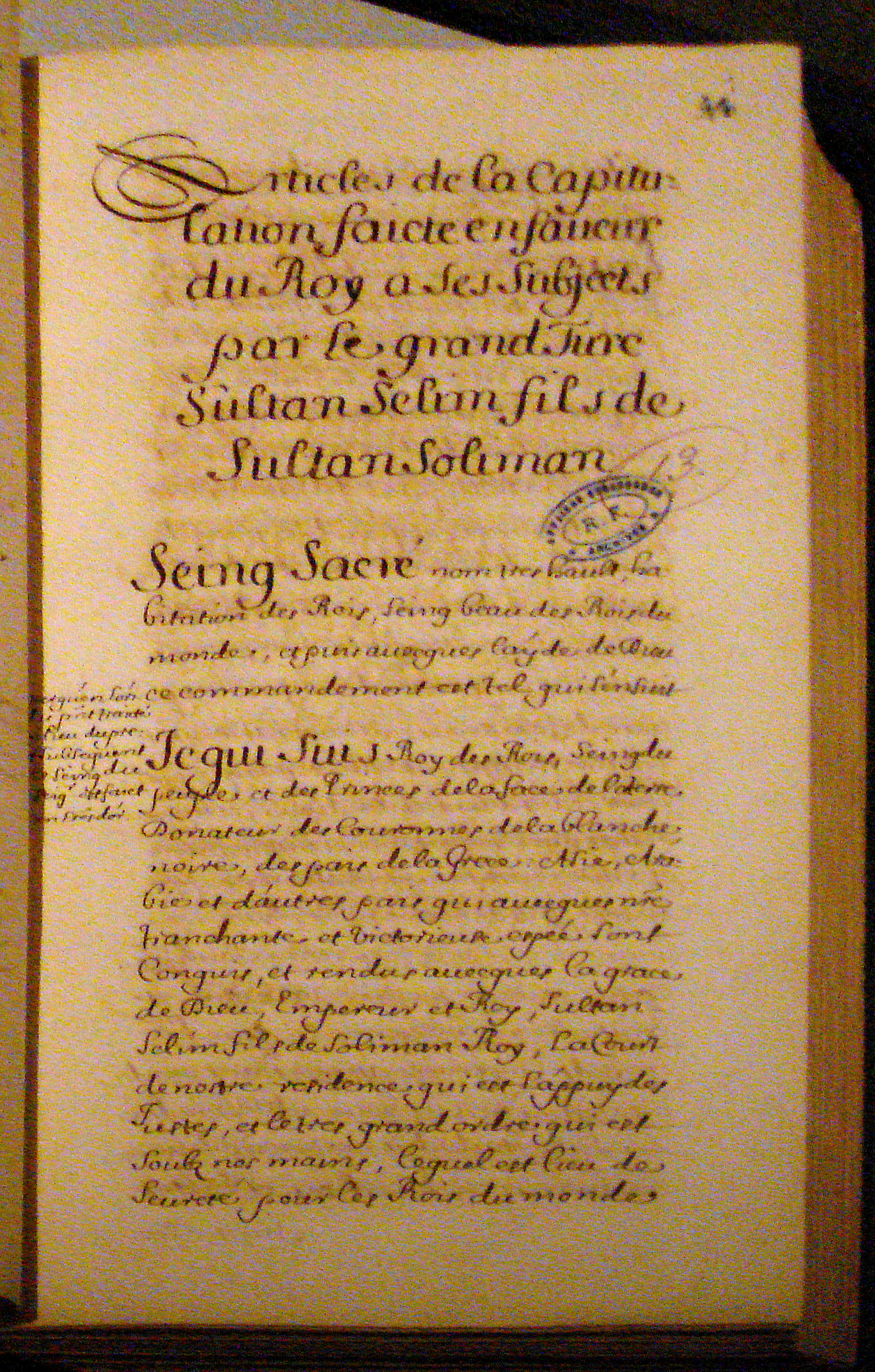
16th century copy of the 1569 Capitulations between Charles IX and Selim II.

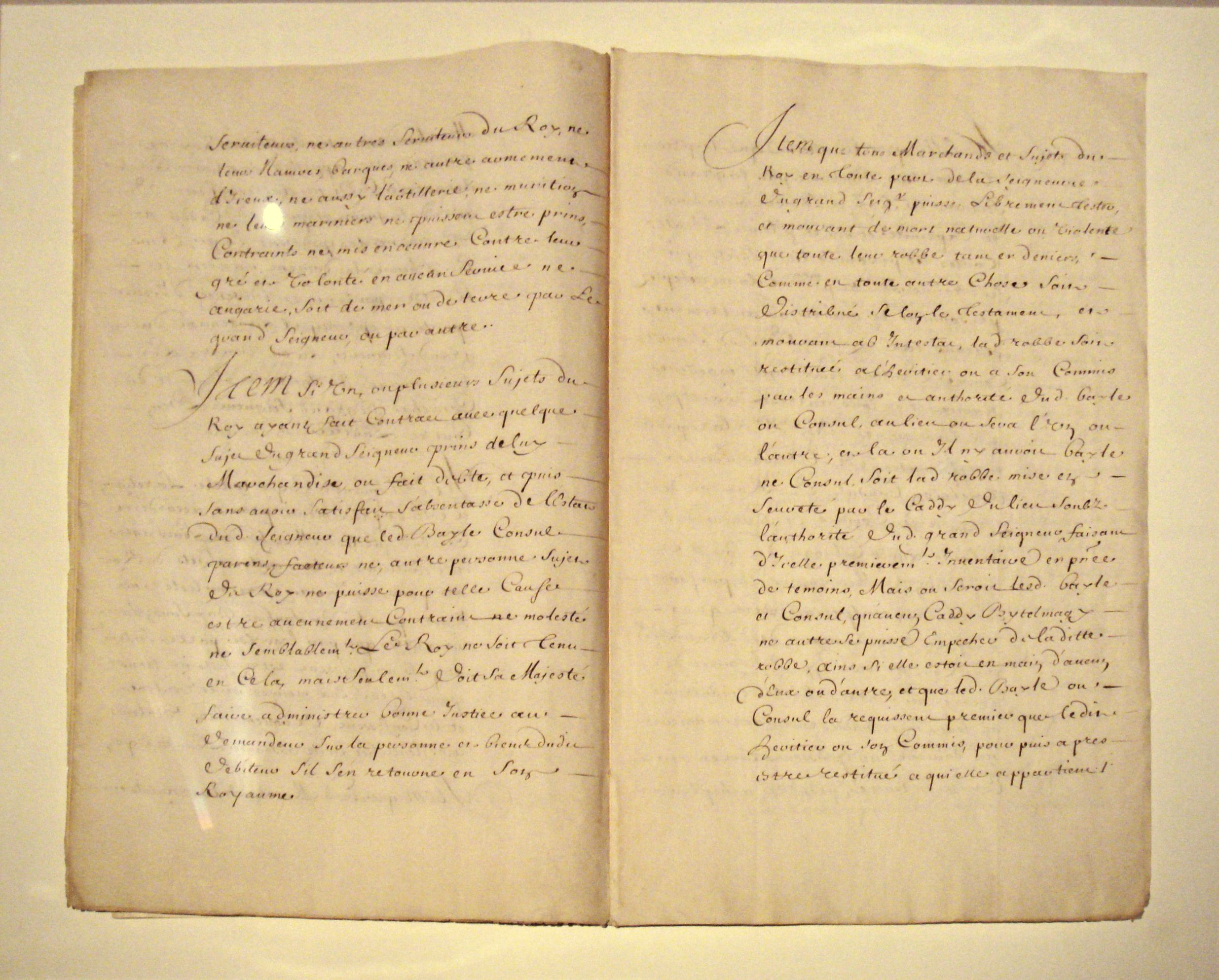
Draft of the 1536 Treaty or Capitulations negotiated between French ambassador Jean de La Forêt and Ibrahim Pasha, a few days before his assassination, expanding to the whole Ottoman Empire the privileges received in Egypt from the Mamluks before 1518.

In 1819, Egypt under Muhammad Ali began programs of state-sponsored industrialization, which included setting up factories for weapons production, an iron foundry, large-scale cotton cultivation, mills for ginning, spinning and weaving of cotton, and enterprises for agricultural processing. By the early 1830s, Egypt had 30 cotton mills, employing about 30,000 workers. In the early 19th century, Egypt had the world's fifth most productive cotton industry, in terms of the number of spindles per capita. The industry was initially driven by machinery that relied on traditional energy sources, such as animal power, water wheels, and windmills, which were also the principal energy sources in Western Europe up until around 1870. While steam power had been experimented with in Ottoman Egypt by engineer Taqi ad-Din Muhammad ibn Ma'ruf in 1551, when he invented a steam jack driven by a rudimentary steam turbine, it was under Muhammad Ali of Egypt in the early 19th century that steam engines were introduced to Egyptian industrial manufacturing.

While there was a lack of coal deposits in Egypt, prospectors searched for coal deposits there and manufactured boilers which were installed in Egyptian industries such as ironworks, textile manufacturing, paper mills and hulling mills. Coal was also imported from overseas, at similar prices to what imported coal cost in France, until the 1830s, when Egypt gained access to coal sources in Lebanon, which had a yearly coal output of 4,000 tons. Compared to Western Europe, Egypt also had superior agriculture and an efficient transport network through the Nile. Economic historian Jean Batou argues that the necessary economic conditions for rapid industrialization existed in Egypt during the 1820s–1830s, as well as for the adoption of oil as a potential energy source for its steam engines later in the 19th century.

Following the death of Muhammad Ali in 1849, his industrialization programs fell into decline, after which, according to historian Zachary Lockman, “Egypt was well on its way to full integration into a European-dominated world market as a supplier of a single raw material, cotton.” He argues that, had Egypt succeeded in its industrialization programs, “it might have shared with Japan [or the United States] the distinction of achieving autonomous capitalist development and preserving its independence.”

Economic historian Paul Bairoch argues that free trade contributed to deindustrialization in the Ottoman Empire. In contrast to the protectionism of China, Japan, and Spain, the Ottoman Empire had a liberal trade policy, open to imports. This has origins in capitulations of the Ottoman Empire, dating back to the first commercial treaties signed with France in 1536 and taken further with capitulations in 1673 and 1740, which lowered duties to 3% for imports and exports. The Treaty of Balta Liman with Britain doomed Ottoman industrialization in the 19th century as it was effectively an unequal free trade agreement. The liberal Ottoman policies were praised by British economists such as J. R. McCulloch in his Dictionary of Commerce (1834), but later criticized by British politicians such as Prime Minister Benjamin Disraeli, who cited the Ottoman Empire as "an instance of the injury done by unrestrained competition" in the 1846 Corn Laws debate:

There has been free trade in Turkey, and what has it produced? It has destroyed some of the finest manufacturers in the world. As late as 1812 these manufactures existed, but they have been destroyed. That was the consequences of competition in Turkey, and its effects have been as pernicious as the effects of the contrary principle in Spain.

== Domestic ==
Domestic trade vastly exceeded international trade in both value and volume though researchers have little in direct measurements. Much of Ottoman history has been based on European archives that did not document the empire's internal trade resulting in it being underestimated.

Quataert illustrates the size of internal trade by considering some examples. The French Ambassador in 1759 commented that total textile imports into the empire would clothe a maximum of 800,000 of a population of at least 20 million. In 1914 less than a quarter of agricultural produce was being exported the rest being consumed internally. The early 17th century saw trade in Ottoman-made goods in the Damascus province exceeded five times the value of all foreign-made goods sold there. Finally, amongst the sparse internal trade data are some 1890s statistics for three non-leading cities. The sum value of their interregional trade in the 1890s equaled around 5 percent of total Ottoman international export trade at the time. Given their minor status, cities like Istanbul, Edirne, Salonica, Damascus, Beirut or Aleppo being far greater than all three, this is impressively high. These major trade centers, dozens of medium-sized towns, hundreds of small towns and thousands of villages remain uncounted – it puts into perspective the size of domestic trade.

Two factors that had a major impact on both internal and international trade were wars and government policies. Wars had a major impact on commerce, especially where there were territorial losses that would rip apart Ottoman economic unity, often destroying relationships and patterns that had endured centuries. The role of government policy is more hotly debated – however, most policy-promoted barriers to Ottoman international and internal commerce disappeared or were reduced sharply. However, there appears little to indicate a significant decline in internal trade other than the disruption caused by war and ad-hoc territorial losses.

== International ==
Global trade increased around sixty-fourfold in the 19th century whereas for the Ottomans it increased around ten to sixteenfold. The exports of cotton alone doubled between 1750 and 1789. The largest increases were recorded from the ports of Smyrna and Salonica in the Balkans. However, they were partially offset by some reductions from Syria and Constantinople. While cotton exports to France and England doubled between the late 17th and late 18th centuries, exports of semi-processed goods to northwest Europe also increased. Whilst the Ottoman market was important to Europe in the 16th century, it was no longer so by 1900. The Ottoman Empire was not shrinking - quite the opposite – however, it was becoming relatively less significant.

As regards trade imbalance, only Constantinople ran an import surplus. Both Lampe and McGowan argue that the empire as a whole, and the Balkans in particular, continued to record an export surplus throughout the period. (Note: As early as 1850, French authorities became concerned that imports of 27.3 million francs from the Ottoman Empire exceeded what France was exporting to the 19.9 million francs and was anxious to balance the two figures.) The balance of trade however moved against the Ottomans from the 18th century onwards. They would re-export high-value luxury goods, mainly silks from the Far East and exported many of its goods. Luxury goods began being imported. Through the 18th century, exports moved to unprocessed goods whilst at the same time commodities were imported from European colonies. Most of these commodities were produced by forced labor undercutting domestic production. However, according to most scholars, a favorable balance of trade still existed at the end of the 18th century. 19th century trade increased multi-fold, however exports remained similar to 18th century levels. Foodstuffs and raw materials were the focus with carpets and raw silk appearing in the 1850s. Although the basket of exports remained generally constant, the relative importance of the goods would vary considerably.

From the 18th century onwards, foreign merchants and Ottoman non-Muslims became dominant in the growing international trade. With increasing affluence, their political significance grew, especially in Syria. Muslim merchants however dominated internal trade and trade between the interior and coastal cities. (Note: In 1793, Aleppo alone issued 1,500 certificates to Ottoman non-Muslims for such privileges which through the course of the eighteenth century allowed them to replace their European counterparts. Istanbul boasted over 1,000 registered merchants in the early twentieth century, of which only 3 per cent comprised British, French or German merchants.)

Foreign trade, a minor part of the Ottoman economy, became slightly more important towards the end of the 19th century with the rise of protectionism in Europe and producers looking to new markets. Its growth was seen throughout the period under study, particularly the 19th century. Throughout, the balance of payments was roughly on par with no significant long-term deficits or surpluses.

== Finance ==
Ottoman bureaucratic and military expenditure was raised by taxation, generally from the agrarian population. Pamuk notes considerable variation in monetary policy and practice in different parts of the empire. Although there was monetary regulation, enforcement was often relaxed and little effort was made to control the activities of merchants, moneychangers, and financiers. (Note: Under Islamic law usury was prohibited, Pamuk quotes some stratagems that were used, notably double-sale agreements.) During the "price revolution" of the 16th century, when inflation took off, there were price increases of around 500 percent (Note: These figures are based on price indices Pamuk constructed for Istanbul in the sixteenth and seventeenth centuries; other scholars have recorded similar trends for the period.) from the end of the 15th century to the close of the 17th. (Note: Pamuk argues the Turkish economic historian Omer Barkan is incorrect in attributing price rises to imported inflation rather the cause being the velocity of circulation of money drove prices up, as well as increasing commercialization with the growing use of money as a medium of exchange.) However, the problem of inflation did not remain and the 18th century did not witness the problem again.

The 18th century witnessed increasing expenditure for military-related expenditure and the 19th century for both bureaucracy and military. McNeill describes an Ottoman stagnation through center-periphery relations – a moderately taxed center with periphery provinces suffering the burden of costs. (Note: McNeill's the contribution was informed by his research on relations between centers and peripheries of world empires.) Though this analysis may apply to some provinces, like Hungary, recent scholarship has found that most of the financing was through provinces closer to the center. As the empire modernized itself in line with European powers, the role of the central state grew and diversified. In the past, it had contented itself with raising tax revenues and war-making. It increasingly began to address education, health and public works, activities that used to be organized by religious leaders in the communities – this can be argued as being necessary in a rapidly changing world and was a necessary Ottoman response. At the end of the 18th century, there were around 2,000 civil officials ballooning to 35,000 in 1908. Starting in the mid 1800s, the Ottoman military increasingly adopted western technology and methods. Other innovations were increasingly being adopted including the telegraph, railroads and photography, utilised against old mediators who were increasingly marginalised. (Note: These comprised diverse groups such as the Janissaries, guilds, tribes, religious authorities and provincial notables.)

Up to 1850, the Ottoman Empire was the only empire to have never contracted foreign debt and its financial situation was generally sound. As the 19th century increased the state's financial needs, it knew it could not raise the revenues from taxation or domestic borrowings, so resorted to massive debasement and then issued paper money. It had considered European debt, which had surplus funds available for overseas investment, but avoided it aware of the associated dangers of European control. However, the Crimean War of 1853–1856 resulted in the necessity of such debt. Between 1854 and 1881, the Ottoman Empire went through a critical phase of history. Beginning with the first foreign loan in 1854, this process involved sporadic attempts by western powers to impose some control. From 1863 a second and more intense phase began leading to a snowballing effect of accumulated debts. In 1875, with external debt at 242 million Turkish pounds, over half the budgetary expenditures going toward its service, the Ottoman government facing some economic crises declared its inability to make repayments. The fall in tax revenues due to bad harvests and increased expenditure made worse by the costs of suppressing the uprisings in the Balkans hastened the slide into bankruptcy. After negotiations with the European powers, the Public Debt Administration was set up, to which certain revenues were assigned. This arrangement subjected the Ottomans to foreign financial control from which they failed to free themselves, in part because of continued borrowing. In 1914, the Ottoman debt stood at 139.1 million Turkish pounds, and the government was still dependent on European financiers.

The Ottomans had not yet developed their financial system in line with London and Paris. Since the beginning of the 18th century, the government was aware of the need for a reliable bank. The Galata bankers, as well as the Bank of Constantinople, did not have the capital or competence for such large undertakings. As such, Ottoman borrowings followed the Heckscher-Ohlin theorem.

Borrowing spanned two distinct periods, 1854–1876 (see Table 4). The first is the most important resulted in defaults in 1875. Borrowings were normally at 4 to 5 percent of the nominal value of the bond, new issues, however, being sold at prices well below these values netted of commissions involved in the issue, resulting in a much higher effective borrowing rate – coupled with a deteriorating financial situation, the borrowing rate rarely went below 10 percent after 1860.

European involvement began with the creation of the Public Debt Administration, after which a relatively peaceful period meant no wartime expenditures and the budget could be balanced with lower levels of external borrowing. The semi-autonomous Egyptian province also ran up huge debts in the late 19th century resulting in foreign military intervention. With security from the Debt Administration further European capital entered the empire in railroad, port and public utility projects, increasing foreign capital control of the Ottoman economy. The debt burden increased consuming a sizeable chunk of the Ottoman tax revenues – by the early 1910s deficits had begun to grow again with military expenditure growing and another default may have occurred had it not been for the outbreak of the First World War.

The exact amount of annual income the Ottoman government received, is a matter of considerable debate, due to the scantness and ambiguous nature of the primary sources. The following table contains approximate estimates.

Year	Annual Revenue
1433	2,500,000 ducats
1496	3,300,000 ducats
1520	3,130,000 ducats
1526	4,500,000 ducats
1530	6,000,000 ducats
1553	7,166,000 ducats
1558	7,740,000 ducats
1566	8,000,000 ducats
1587	9,000,000 ducats
1592	10,000,000 ducats
1603	8,000,000 ducats
1660	12,000,000 ducats

== See also ==
- Economic history of Turkey
- Capitulations of the Ottoman Empire
- Sick man of Europe
- Ottoman Decline Thesis

== Bibliography ==
- Anderson, Olive (1964). "Great Britain and the beginnings of the Ottoman public debt, 1854–55". The Historical Journal. 7 (1): 47–63. doi:10.1017/S0018246X00025255. JSTOR 3020517. S2CID 162191534.
- Baer, Gabriel (1970). "The administrative, economic and social functions of Turkish guilds". International Journal of Middle East Studies. 1 (1): 28–50. doi:10.1017/S0020743800023898. S2CID 162806163.
- Balla, Eliana. and Noel D. Johnson, "Fiscal crisis and institutional change in the Ottoman Empire and France." Journal of Economic History (2009) 69#3 pp: 809-845 online.
- Casale, Giancarlo (2006). "The Ottoman administration of the spice trade in the sixteenth century Red Sea and Persian Gulf". Journal of the Economic and Social History of the Orient. 49 (2): 170–198. doi:10.1163/156852006777502081.
- Clay, Christopher (1994). "The origins of modern banking in the Levant: the branch network of the Imperial Ottoman Bank, 1890–1914". International Journal of Middle East Studies. 26 (4): 589–614. doi:10.1017/S0020743800061122. S2CID 162130850.
- Clay, Christopher (2001a). "Book review: The Ottoman city between east and west: Aleppo, Izmir, and Istanbul". Economic History Review. 54 (1): 204. doi:10.1111/1468-0289.t01-1-00189.
- Clay, Christopher (2001b). Gold for the Sultan: Western Bankers and Ottoman Finance, 1856–1881. IB Taurus. ISBN 9781860644764.
- Conte, Giampaolo. "Ottoman and Greek Sovereign Debt and Bankruptcy: A Long-Term Comparative Analysis." The Journal of European Economic History 48.2 (2019): 111-123 online
- Critz, José Morilla; Olmstead, Alan L.; Rhode, Paul W. (1999). ""Horn of Plenty": The globalization of Mediterranean horticulture and the economic development of southern Europe, 1880–1930". Journal of Economic History. 59 (2): 316–352. doi:10.1017/S0022050700022853. JSTOR 2566554. PMID 21987866. S2CID 44972078.
- Eldem, Edhem (2005). "Ottoman financial integration with Europe: foreign loans, the Ottoman Bank and the Ottoman public debt". European Review. 13 (3): 431–445. doi:10.1017/S1062798705000554. S2CID 58936200.
- Faroqhi, Suraiya (1999). Approaching Ottoman History: an Introduction to the Sources. Cambridge University Press. ISBN 9780521666480.
- Finkel, C. (1988). The Administration of Warfare: the Ottoman Military Campaigns in Hungary 1593–1606. Vol. I. Vienna: VWGO.
- Frangakis-Syrett, Elena (1994). "Book review: Donald Quataert, Manufacturing and Technology Transfer in the Ottoman Empire, 1800–1914, Études Turques-USHS no. 2 (Istanbul/Strasbourg: Isis Press and Université des Sciences Humaines de Strasbourg, 1992). Pp. 61". International Journal of Middle East Studies. 26 (1): 114–116. doi:10.1017/S0020743800059869. S2CID 161875336.
- von Hammer, J. (1829). Geschichte des osmanischen Reichs. Vol. IV. Pest.
- İnalcık, Halil; Quataert, Donald (1994). An Economic and Social History of the Ottoman Empire, 1300–1914. Cambridge University Press. ISBN 9780521343152.
- İslamoğlu-İnan, Huri (2004). "State and peasants in the Ottoman Empire: a study of peasant economy in north-central Anatolia during the sixteenth century". In Huri İslamoğlu-İnan (ed.). The Ottoman Empire and the World-Economy. Cambridge University Press. pp. 101–159. ISBN 9780521526074.
- Issawi, C. (1966). The Economic History of the Middle East, 1800–1914: a book of Readings. London: University of Chicago Press.
- Lybyer, Albert Howe (1913). The Government of the Ottoman Empire in the Time of Suleiman the Magnificent. Cambridge University Press.
- McNeill, W. (1964). Europe's Steppe Frontier 1500–1800. London: University of Chicago Press.
- Pamuk, Sevket. "The evolution of financial institutions in the Ottoman Empire, 1600-1914." Financial History Review 11.1 (2004): 7–32. online
- Pamuk, Şevket (1984a). "The Ottoman Empire in the 'Great Depression' of 1873–1896". Journal of Economic History. 44: 107–118. doi:10.1017/S0022050700031399. S2CID 154752536.
- Pamuk, Şevket (1984b). "Book review: Social Disintegration and Popular Resistance in the Ottoman Empire, 1881–1908: Reactions to European Economic Penetration. By Donald Quataert. Studies in Near Eastern Civilization. New York: New York University Press, 1983. Distributed by Columbia University Press, New York. Pp. xxii, 205. $35.00". Journal of Economic History. 44 (3): 872–873. doi:10.1017/S0022050700032654.
- Pamuk, Şevket (1987). The Ottoman Empire and European Capitalism 1820–1913: Trade, Investment and Production. Cambridge University Press. ISBN 9780521130929.
- Pamuk, Şevket (2000). A Monetary History of the Ottoman Empire. Cambridge University Press. ISBN 9780521617116.
- Pamuk, Şevket (2001). "The price revolution in the Ottoman Empire reconsidered". International Journal of Middle East Studies. 33 (1): 69–89. doi:10.1017/S0020743801001040. S2CID 162019398.
- Pamuk, Sevket. The Ottoman economy and its institutions (Ashgate Publishers, 2009).
- Pamuk, Şevket. "The Ottoman Economy in World War I." in The Economics of World War I (2005): 112-36.
- Quataert, Donald (1975). "Dilemma of development: the agricultural bank and agricultural reform in Ottoman Turkey, 1888–1908". International Journal of Middle East Studies. 6 (2): 210–227. doi:10.1017/S002074380002451X. JSTOR 162420. S2CID 163638216.
- Quataert, Donald (2000). The Ottoman Empire, 1700–1922. New Approaches to European History. Vol. 34. Cambridge University Press. ISBN 9780521633604.
- Quataert, Donald (2004). "A provisional report concerning the impact of European capital on Ottoman port workers, 1880–1909". In Huri İslamoğlu-İnan (ed.). The Ottoman Empire and the World-Economy. Cambridge University Press. pp. 300–310. ISBN 9780521526074.
- Raccagni, Michelle (1980). "The French economic interests in the Ottoman Empire". International Journal of Middle East Studies. 11 (3): 339–376. doi:10.1017/S0020743800054672. S2CID 162224837.
- Treadgold, Warren (1997). A History of the Byzantine State and Society. Stanford University Press. ISBN 9780804726306.
- Ülker, Erol. "Military, Finance, and Economy in the Late Ottoman Empire: Directorate-General of Hedjaz and Military Railways and Ports, 1914–1919." Journal of Balkan and Near Eastern Studies 22.1 (2020): 17-28 online.
- Vlami, Despina. Trading with the Ottomans: The Levant Company in the Middle East (Bloomsbury, 2014).
- Wilson, R. (2003). "Book review: A Monetary History of the Ottoman Empire. By Şevket Pamuk. Cambridge, U.K.: Cambridge University Press, 2000. xxvi + 276 pp. Index, notes, bibliography, graphs, map, photographs. Cloth, $70.00". Business History Review. 77 (2): 384–386. doi:10.2307/30041180. ISBN 0-521-44197-8. JSTOR 30041180. S2CID 155963866.
