= Railway construction in the Ottoman Empire =

Railroad transportation in the Ottoman Empire

The construction of railways in the Ottoman Empire were mainly a sociopolitical move by administrators and statesmen within the borders of the Caliphate and beyond.

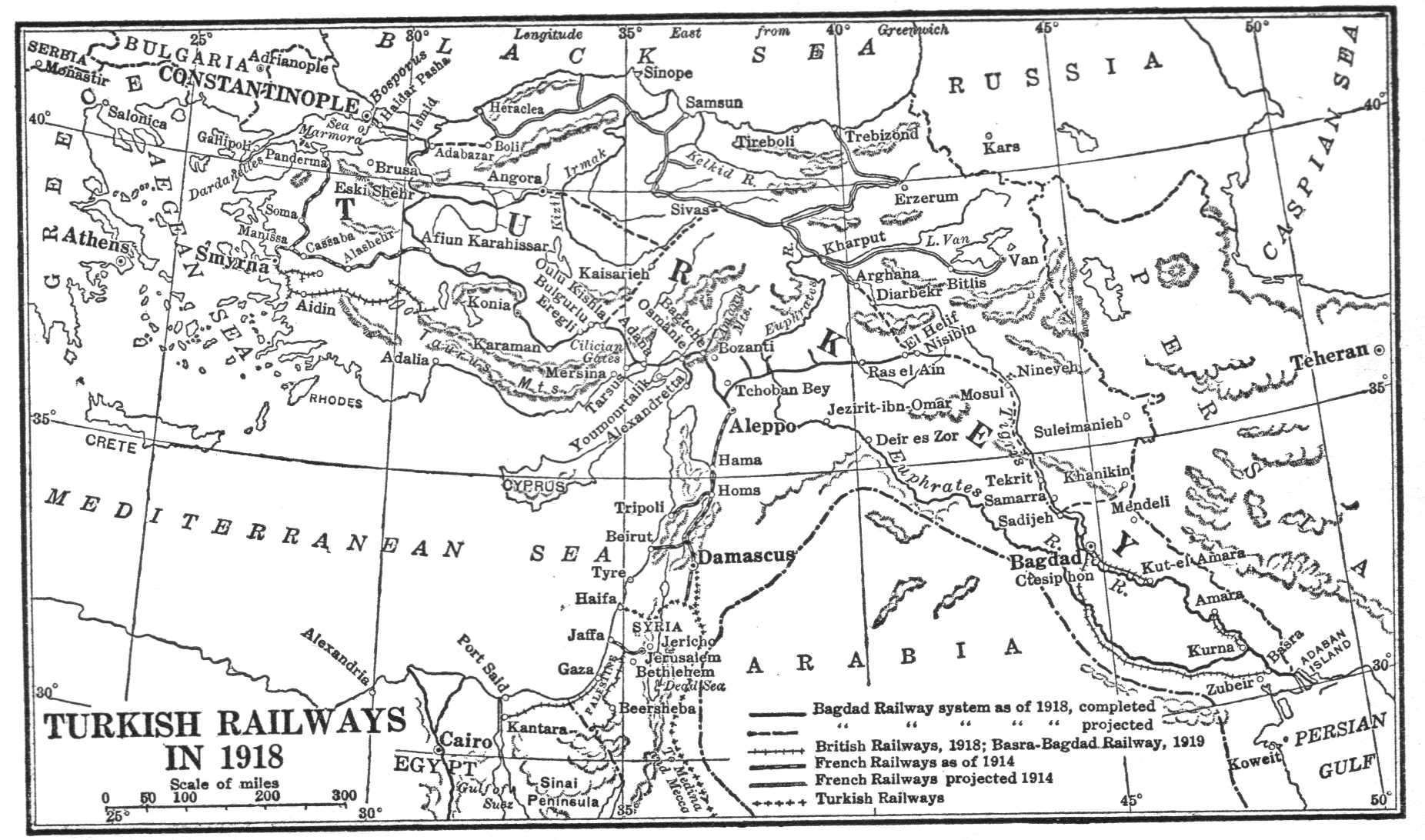
Railway system within the empire in 1918

== Road construction method ==
Roads in the Ottoman Empire were constructed by the orders of local administrators based only on military needs for a long time. During the periods where the Ottoman state was strong and flourishing, the construction of roads progressed in several levels, only to be put aside and neglected due to the declining economy of the country. After the Edict of Gulhane, a reformation to the Empire during the Tanzimat period, the "Road and Bridges Regulation" was issued and a solution to the road problem was put forward and partially brought to life. In addition, the state envisaged to set up sea connections and transportation vehicles to aid the goal.

With the developing and changing means of transportation, the rising model of rail transportation in Europe and America was of great importance for the Ottoman Empire economically, politically and militarily.

The railroad was an increasingly popular form of transportation at the time. Its convenience, cost, and modernity were in question. The economic situation of the Ottoman Empire, however, was insufficient and inadequate for these systems.

== Ottoman expectations on railway transportation ==
Railroad network by country in 1914
Countries	Length of the railway systems in km
United States of America	388,000
German Empire	64,000
India	55,000
France	51,000
Russian Empire	23,500
Ottoman Empire	5,759

Abdul Hamid II wanted multiple sophisticated railroad systems in the nation for a myriad of reasons, some of them being; to strengthen the Ottoman army, to prevent rebellions and banditry, as well as to send agricultural and domestically produced products to the world market. And arguably, the main reason for his interest in the construction of railways was his goal to unite and connect the Muslim world both in the Empire and beyond.

With the construction of the railways, agricultural production would be increased and thus the revenues from taxes would also increase. In addition to this, trade would develop and customs duties from imports and exports would be transferred to the national treasury. Rich mineral deposits would be opened to businesses in the locations where the railway passed, and mining production would be increased.

The economic inadequacy of the Ottoman Empire to fund a nation-wide railway transportation system caused it to be built according to the economic and political interests of the European imperialist states.

Unlike the potential profitable purpose that the railway could've provided to the Ottoman Empire, it led to European states to think about its own policies. This is because European nations were resorting to economic and political pressure on the Ottoman Empire to gain privileges on the railways. The aim of Europe was to create European population zones within the Caliphate to increase their influence over the Empire. This was done by undertaking railway construction in the Ottoman Empire. This situation, which the French and the British attempted at first, developed in favor of Germany after 1889.

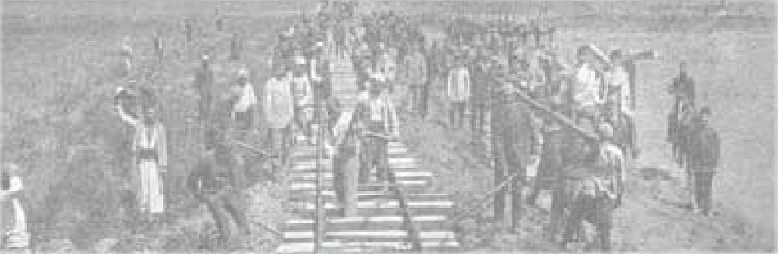
Workers at the İzmir-Aydın railway construction in the late 1850s, early 1860s

== European railway investment in the Ottoman Empire ==
European states wanted to strengthen their social bases by building railways in the Ottoman Empire and to have privileges on railroads in the nation even above the Ottoman Empire itself. Alongside this, they constantly competed to build a railway. When one state built a railway and gained privilege within the empire, another state was also pressuring the Ottoman state and in turn receiving privileges.

Another issue which was in the interests of the European states is the transit route of the railways, which was a big problem in the Ottoman Empire. It was not in Europe's interest that the railway started from the center, that is, Istanbul, and spread throughout the country. That's why they were in favor of starting the railway near the Mediterranean sea.

A subject Europe pushed forward were that of Ottoman debts to its nations. The Ottomans gave privileges in return for their debts or offered privileges over railways in the country when asking for a loan.

The first railway construction in the Ottoman Empire emerged with the Tanzimat. Later, after the establishment of the Ottoman Public Debt Administration, the constructions of railroads gained momentum once again.

The railways in the Ottoman Empire were built thanks to foreign funding, with the exception of the Hijaz Line. The funds were first provided by the British, then by the French and Germans.

One of the most important methods of the Ottoman railway system was that the ability to construct railways in the country was given as a privilege to European countries and companies. With a system called 'km guarantee', the profits of the companies were guaranteed and ensured by the Ottoman Empire. If a railway company made a profit below the guaranteed profit, or incurred losses, the Ottomans compensated this financially from the treasury.

One of the privileges provided by the Ottoman Empire to countries and companies who were building railways in the nation was that when the materials of the railroads were exported into the country, they were not to be subject to tariffs.

== Results ==
Except for the 356-kilometer Erzurum-Sarıkamış-Border line, which remained from the Russians during the Ottoman period, a total of 8343 kilometers of railways were built, with the 1564-kilometer Hejaz line built by the state itself and 6778-kilometer railways built by different foreign companies. 4112 km of these railroads remain within the borders of the Republic of Turkey. However, these railways, shaped by external pressures and extending from the ports to the inner regions in the image of a tree, served mostly European states rather than the interests of the country; National and independent methods could not be followed in the Ottoman Empire at the time, which led to them relying on foreign corporations and European nations for funds.
