= Xenocrates of Aphrodisias =

Greek physician

Xenocrates (Greek: Ξενοκράτης; fl. 1st century) a Greek physician of Aphrodisias in Cilicia, who must have lived about the middle of the 1st century, as he was probably a contemporary of Andromachus the Younger. Galen says that he lived in the second generation before himself. He wrote some pharmaceutical works, and is blamed by Galen for making use of disgusting remedies, for instance, human brains, flesh, liver, bone ash, urine, excrement, etc. One of his works was entitled On Useful Things from Living Beings (Greek: Περὶ τῆς ἀπὸ τῶν Ζώων Ὠφελείας). He is several times quoted by Galen, and also by Clement of Alexandria; Artemidorus; Pliny; Oribasius; Aëtius; and Alexander of Tralles. Besides some short fragments of his writings there is extant a synopsis of a work on marine creatures, (Greek: Περὶ τῆς ἀπὸ τῶν Ἐνύδρων Τροφῆς) preserved by Oribasius.
