= Dana Island =

Island in Mersin Province, Turkey

Native name: Dana Adası
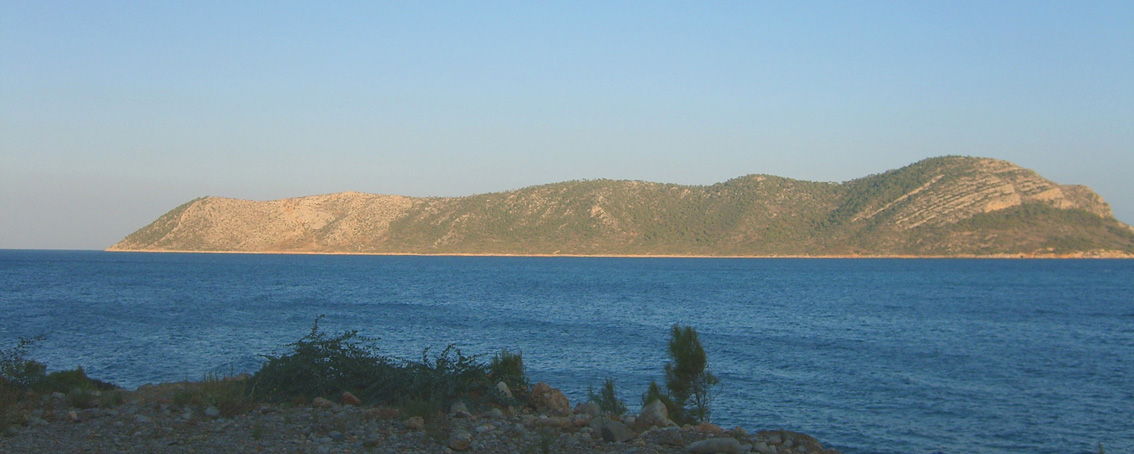
- From the mainland (north)

- Location within Turkey

Geography
- Location: Mediterranean Sea
- Coordinates: 36°11.4′N 33°46.3′E

Administration
- Turkey
- İl (province): Mersin Province
- İlçe: Silifke

Dana Island (Turkish: Dana Adası, also called Kargıncık Adası; Ancient Greek: Πιτυούσσα, romanized: Pituoússa; Latin: Pityussa) is a small Mediterranean island of Turkey.

== Geography ==
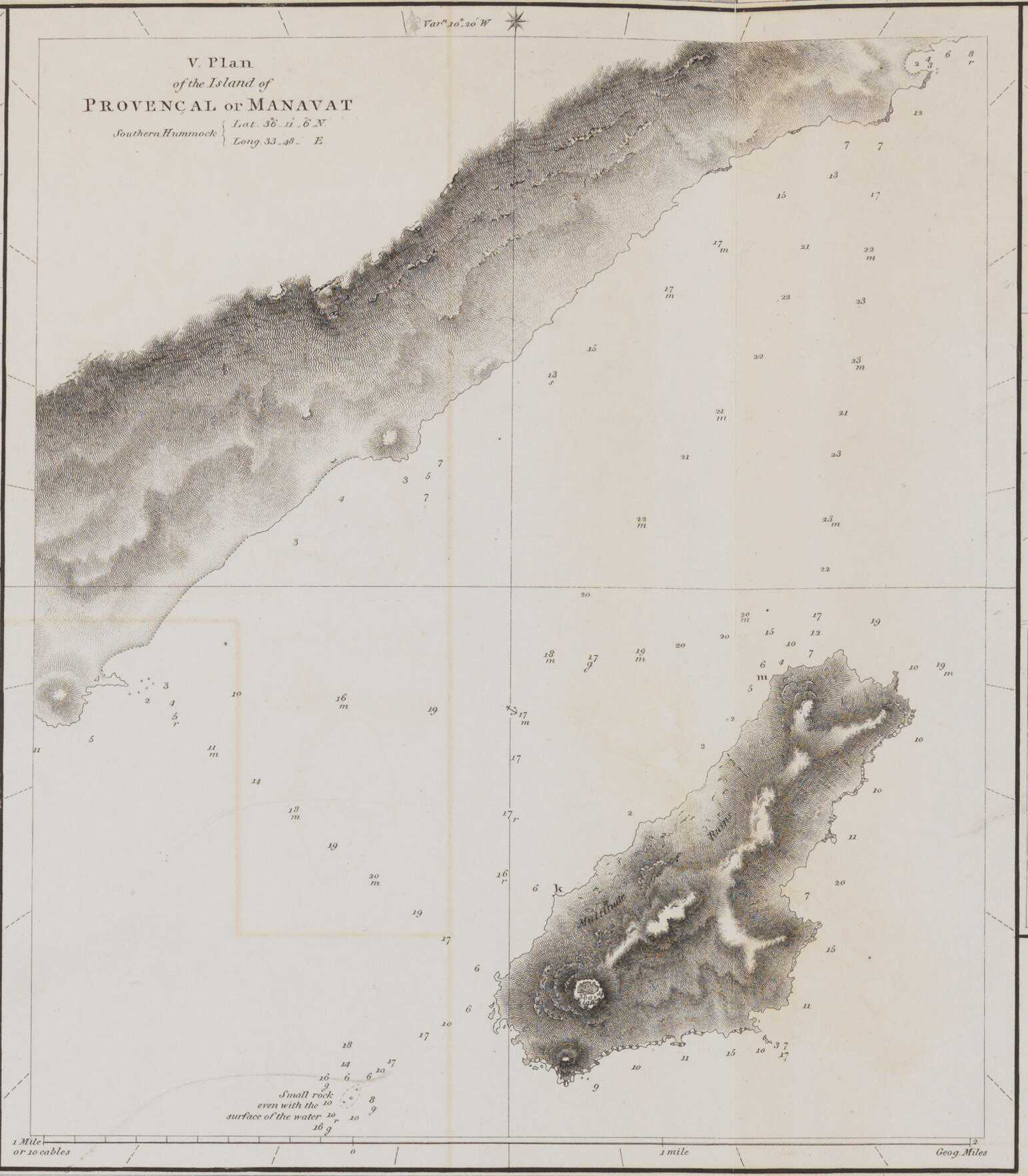
1819 Nautical Chart of Dana from Beaufort's survey

Dana Adası lies parallel to south coast of Turkey at 36°11′N 33°46′E in the province of Mersin. The distance from the shore is 2.5 kilometres (1.6 mi). The passage between the main land and the island which is known as Kargıcak strait is a convenient passage for maritime traffic. The shape of the island is roughly rectangular with dimensions 2.7 km × 0.9 km (1.68 mi × 0.56 mi). The highest peak is 250 metres (820 ft). Dana Adası is quite rocky and covered with maquis shrubland and yellow pine forest.

== History ==
Francis Beaufort, who surveyed the south coast of Turkey in 1811–1812, states that the island was called Manavat by the local people, and Provençal Island by sailors. He suggested that this derived from the name of one of the ranks of the Knights Hospitallers who occupied forts and islands along this coast.

According to recent research, there were many shipyards in Dana Island, probably dating to the Late Bronze Age (c. 1200 BC). Assistant professor Hakan Öniz says that the island was the largest proven shipyard in the ancient world, however, the dating of the shipyards remains uncertain, as the oldest pottery found on the island dates only to the 8th century BC and the island seems to have been occupied mainly after that period, furthermore, the peak occupation of the island occurred in Late antiquity, in fact the shipyard itself might date to the Roman and Late Antiquity periods, and the function of the rock cut features as slipways for ships has been debated. There are also some ruins at the southern coast of the main land facing the island. Probably, these two settlements were the control posts dominating the two extremes of the strait. The island was inhabited during the Roman and early Byzantine era. There are ruins of a few churches, graves, houses, aqueducts, a Roman bath and a harbour establishment at the north of the island. According to some sources, French merchants also used the island as their port during the Middle Ages.

== See also ==
- Aphrodisias of Cilicia
