= Bone ash =

Material formed from calcination of bones

Bone ash is a white material produced by the calcination of bones. Typical bone ash consists of about 55.82% calcium oxide, 42.39% phosphorus pentoxide, and 1.79% water. The exact composition of these compounds varies depending upon the type of bones being used, but generally the formula for bone ash is Ca_{5}(OH)(PO_{4})_{3}. Bone ash usually has a density around 3.10 g/mL and a melting point of 1670 °C (3038 °F). Most bones retain their cellular structure through calcination.

== History ==
=== Antiquity ===
Burnt bones have been recovered from numerous Ancient Greek sanctuaries dating from the Late Bronze Age up to the Hellenistic period. The burnt bones are often calcined with a white or blueish color, allowing archaeologists to identify them as sacrificial remains. At the sanctuary to Artemis in Eretria a round altar of fieldstones filled with soil was found, dating to the 8th century BC. The upper surface was covered with clay and animal bones were burned on top, then apparently swept off the surface with terracotta, metal objects, and pottery and trampled until the altar was eventually subsumed by the ritual debris. Some scholars have attributed these altars to chthonian rituals, but this is disputed. Xenocrates of Aphrodisias reported its use as a medicinal ingredient, although cannibalism was, according to Galen, prohibited under the laws of the Roman Empire.

== Uses ==
=== Bone china ===
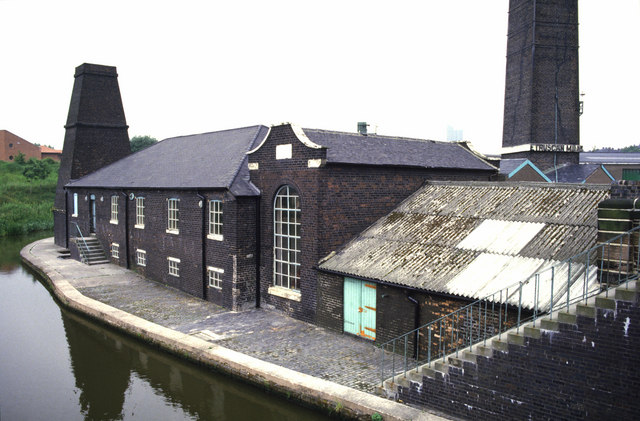
Bone and stone mill built in 1857. Etruria, Stoke-on-Trent

Bone ash is a key raw material for bone china. Constituting around 50% of the body, it reacts with other raw materials in the body during firing to form, amongst other phases, anorthite.

In preparation for use in bone china, bones undergo multiple processing stages, including:

- Removal of any meat before being degreased.
- Calcination to around 1000 °C (1832 °F). This will remove all organic matter, and the bone is left sterilised.
- Being ground with water to fine particle size.
- Being partially dewatered.

Since the 1990s, the use of synthetic alternatives to bone ash, which are based on dicalcium phosphate and tricalcium phosphate, has increased. However, the majority of bone china continues to rely on natural bone ash.

=== Fertilizers ===
Bone ash can be used alone as an organic fertilizer or it can be treated with sulfuric acid to form a "single superphosphate" fertilizer which is more water soluble:

Ca_{3}(PO_{4})_{2} + 2 H_{2}SO_{4} + 5 H_{2}O → 2 CaSO_{4}·2H_{2}O + Ca(H_{2}PO_{4})_{2}·H_{2}O

Similarly, phosphoric acid can be used to form triple superphosphate, a more concentrated phosphorus fertilizer which excludes the gypsum content found in single superphosphate:

Ca_{3}(PO_{4})_{2} + 4 H_{3}PO_{4} → 3 Ca(H_{2}PO_{4})_{2}

=== Metal casting ===
Bone ash is used in foundries for various purposes. Examples include release agents and protective barriers for tools exposed to molten metal, and as a sealant for seams and cracks. Applied as a powder or water slurry, bone ash has many unique characteristics. First of all, the powder has high thermal stability, so it maintains its form in extremely high temperatures. The powder coating itself adheres to metal well and does not drip, run, cause much corrosion, or create noticeable streaks. Using the bone ash is easy as well, as it comes in a powder form, is easy to clean up, and does not separate into smaller parts (therefore requiring no extra mixing).

=== Metallurgy ===
Bone ash is a material often used in cupellation, a process by which precious metals (such as gold and silver) are removed from base metals.

In cupellation, base metals in an impure sample are oxidized with the help of lead and are vaporized and absorbed into a porous cupellation material, typically made of magnesium or calcium. This leaves the precious metals which do not oxidize behind. Bone ash's extremely porous and calcareous structure as well as its high melting point makes it an ideal candidate for cupellation.

=== Other ===
It was used in ancient formulas for white paint and cosmetic pigments.

== Analysis of bone ash ==
The chemical analyses, determined by X-ray fluorescence and reported as %, of three samples of ceramic grade bone ash:

| Reference | | | |
|---|---|---|---|
| SiO_{2} | 0.02 | 0.90 | 1.08 |
| Al_{2}O_{3} | 0.01 | 1.90 | 0.34 |
| Fe_{2}O_{3} | <0.10 | 0.30 | 0.19 |
| TiO_{2} | <0.10 | - | 0.01 |
| CaO | 55.3 | 50.5 | 52.2 |
| MgO | 1.11 | 1.40 | 1.35 |
| K_{2}O | 0.40 | 1.35 | 0.12 |
| Na_{2}O | 1.33 | 2.15 | 0.51 |
| P_{2}O_{5} | 41.9 | 37.2 | 44.2 |
| MnO | <0.10 | - | - |
| Loss on ignition | 0.0 | 4.3 | - |

== In culture ==
=== Bible ===
From Isaiah: "And the people shall be as the burnings of lime: as thorns cut up shall they be burned in the fire"

Its use is mentioned in the Book of Amos (2:1): "I will not turn away the punishment thereof, because he burned the bones of the King of Edom into lime."

== See also ==
- Bone char
- Bone meal – Nutritional supplement and fertilizer made from ground-up bones and entrails
- Organic hydroponic solutions – Growing plants without soil using nutrients in water
- Cremains - composed partially of human bone ash
