= Turkish Maritime Organization =

State owned enterprise

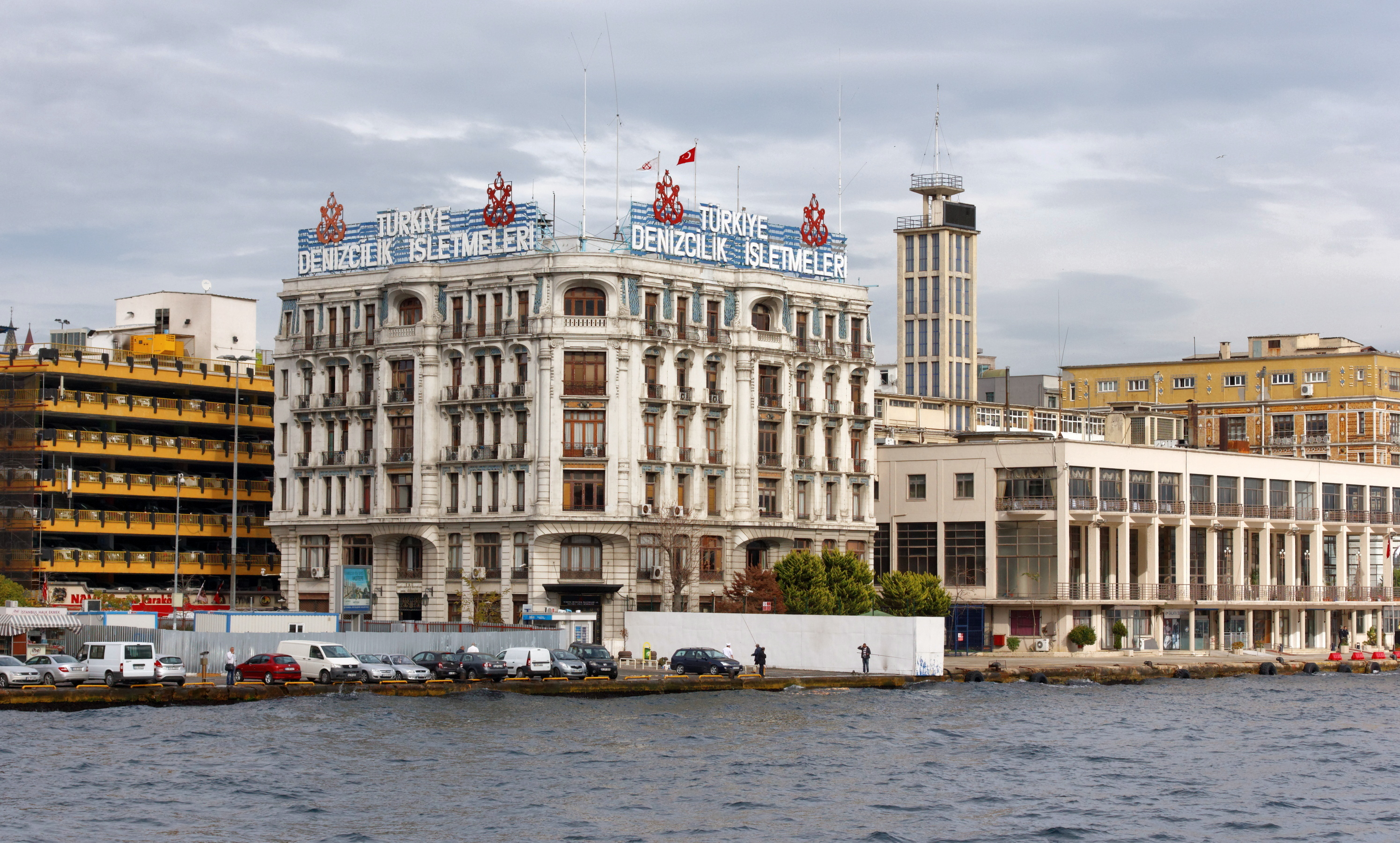
Company headquarters in Karaköy, Istanbul

Turkish Maritime Organization (Turkish: Türkiye Denizcilik İşletmeleri A.Ş., TDİ) is a state-owned company responsible for the operation of certain harbor and shipyards in Turkey. Its headquarters are located in Karaköy quarter of Beyoğlu district, Istanbul.

The precursor of the company was founded in 1843 during the Ottoman Empire era. The company was responsible only for the ports around Istanbul. In 1933, following the establishment of the Turkish Republic, the company was divided into three subcompanies; one for Istanbul, one for the other ports in Turkey and one for the shipyards. In 1938, DenizBank, then a state-owned bank, was founded to support the maritime business. However, in 1997 most of the harbors, as well as the bank, were privatised.

Presently, the harbors owned by the company are as follows:

- Sarayburnu (Istanbul, European side)
- Kuruçeşme (Istanbul, European side)
- Kabatepe (Çanakkale Province)
- Gökçeada-Kuzu (Çanakkale Province Gökçeada island)
- Güllük (Muğla Province)
- Paşalimanı (Balıkesir Province)
- Taşucu (Mersin Province)
