= Port of Istanbul =

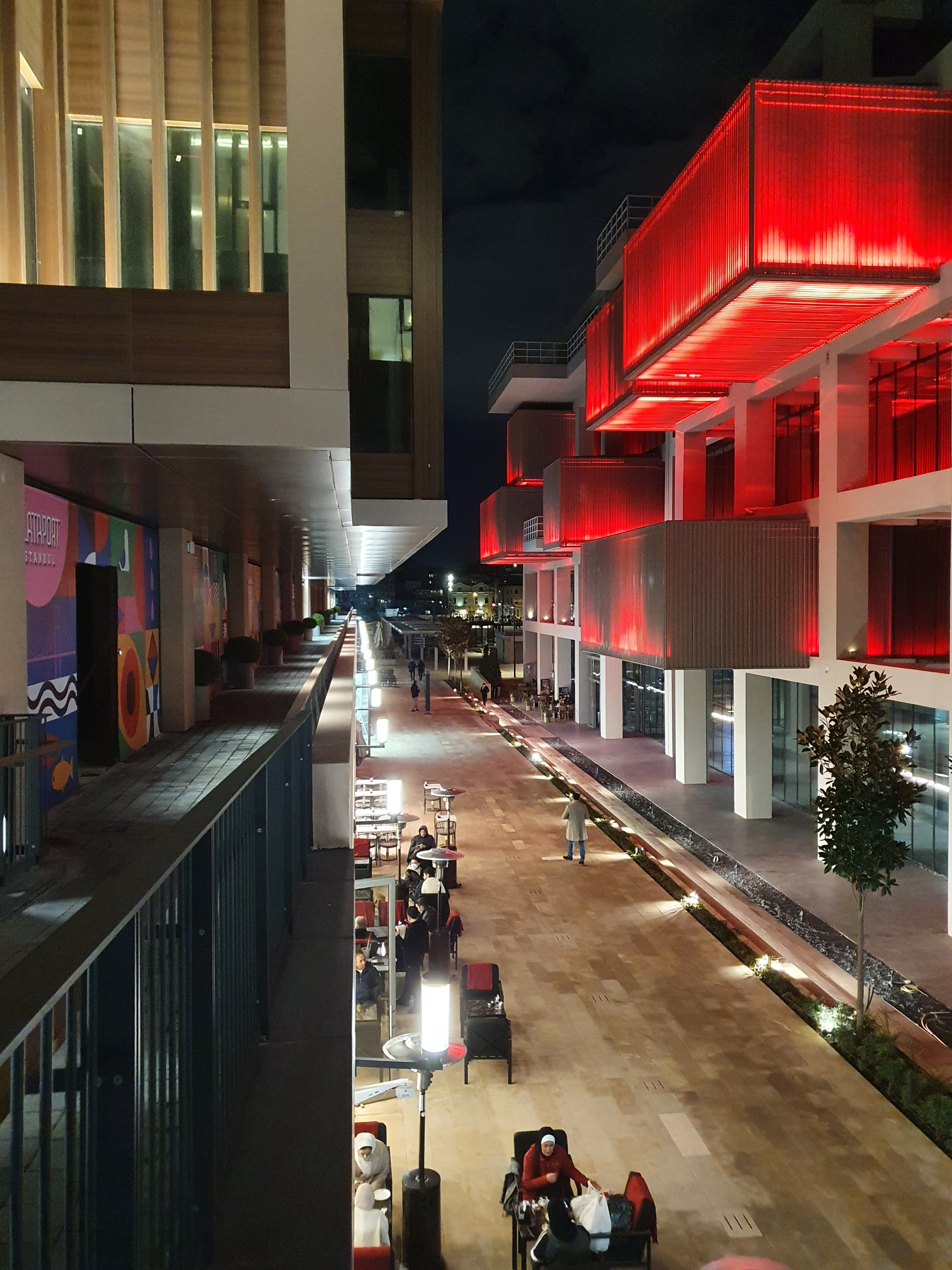
- Port of Istanbul - Terminal building
- Interactive map of Port of Istanbul

Location
- Country: Turkey
- Location: Karaköy, Istanbul
- Coordinates: 41.0228°N 28.9783°E
- UN/LOCODE: TRIST

Details
- Opened: 1900
- Operated by: Turkish Maritime Organization
- Owned by: Turkish Maritime Organization
- Type of harbour: Passenger terminal
- No. of piers: 2

Statistics
- Vessel arrivals: 832 (2007)
- Passenger traffic: 460,427 (2007)

The Port of Istanbul is a passenger terminal for cruise liners, which is situated in the Karaköy neighborhood of the Beyoğlu district in Istanbul, Turkey. It consists of two adjoining piers, the Galata Pier and the Salıpazarı Pier, extending from the Galata Bridge on the Golden Horn to Salıpazarı on the west coast of the Bosporus. It is owned and operated by the state-owned Turkish Maritime Organization (TDİ). The terminal is now integrated into the 400,000-square-metre (4,300,000 sq ft) Galataport mixed-use development which also includes 250 shops and restaurants, hotels, the Istanbul Modern art museum, and other cultural and entertainment facilities; and hosts festivals.

== History ==
The construction of Galata Pier began in 1892, and was completed in 1900. Two warehouses were built in 1910, and three more were added in 1928. From 1925 on, the port authority started to give all the necessary logistics support to the ships, including water and coal supply, loading and unloading, maritime pilotage and marine salvage services.

In 1957, the Salıpazarı Pier, built by the Ministry of Public Works, was completed and handed over to the Turkish Maritime Bank, the forerunner of the TDİ. The Port of Istanbul served as the country's biggest seaport for import cargo until 1986 when it became obsolete due to increase of container shipping.

Converted into a passenger terminal for cruise liners in addition to the existing Galata Pier Terminal, the Salıpazarı Pier continued to serve as a passenger terminal from September 19, 1988 on. It was extended in 2007 to meet the demand by the growing cruise tourism.

== Port facilities ==
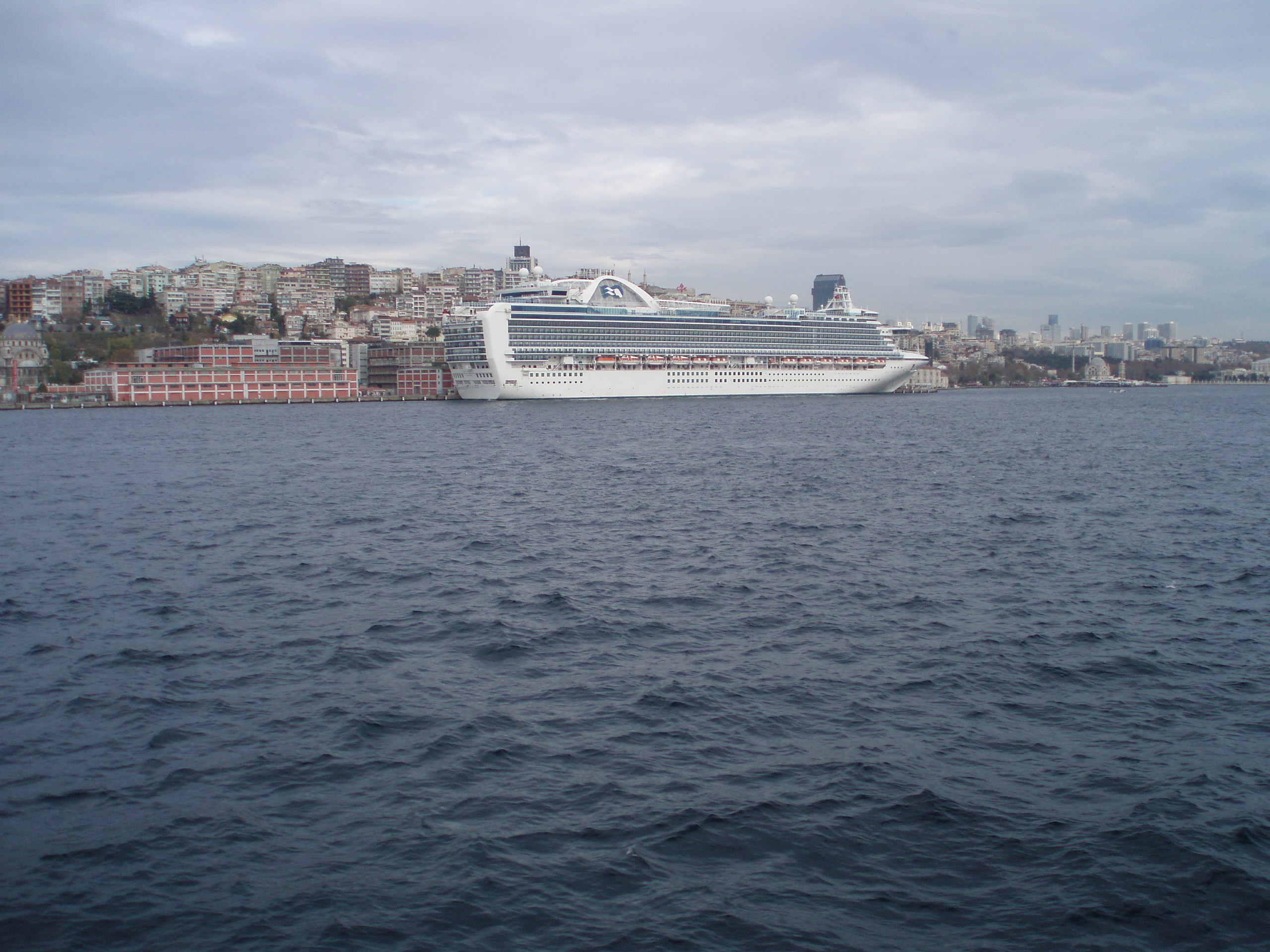
A cruise liner docked at the Port of Istanbul.

The Port of Istanbul consists of three passenger halls, two of them covering an area of 4,000 m^{2} (43,000 sq ft) each and another of 800 m^{2} (8,600 sq ft). The three halls make it possible to handle around 10,000 tourists an hour, maintaining all the border control functions.

There is an open-air parking lot of 5,000 m^{2} (54,000 sq ft) for 200 excursion coaches.

All facilities of the port are under surveillance by 78 closed-circuit television cameras at a control center on a 24/7 basis for security purposes.

It has been reconstructed and is now part of the much larger mixed-use development called Galataport, which has a full shopping center, restaurants, a parking structure and other facilities. Galataport is built along 1200 m of coastline. The port welcomes the foreign flagged mega-cruises with the help of automatically converted custom board.

== Technical details ==
Pier	Length	Depth	Height
Galata	523 m (1,716 ft)	7–9 m (23–30 ft)	0.50–0.80 m (1.6–2.6 ft)
Salıpazarı	627 m (2,057 ft)	10 m (33 ft)	2.00–2.50 m (6.56–8.20 ft)

The port is capable of serving eleven passenger ships daily. In 2007, a total of 832 passenger ships docked at the port bringing 460,427 tourists.

== See also ==
- Galataport

== Bibliography ==
- Wildner, Kathrin (2008). ""Istanbul Modern" – Urban Images, Planning Processes and the Production of Space in Istanbul's Port Area". In Kokot, Waltraut; Gandelsman-Trier, Mijal; Wildner, Kathrin; Wonneberger, Astrid (eds.). Port Cities as Areas of Transition. Ethnographic Perspectives (PDF). Bielefeld: transcript-Verlag. pp. 189–210. ISBN 978-3-89942-949-7.
