= Aphrodisias (Cilicia) =

Port city of ancient Cilicia

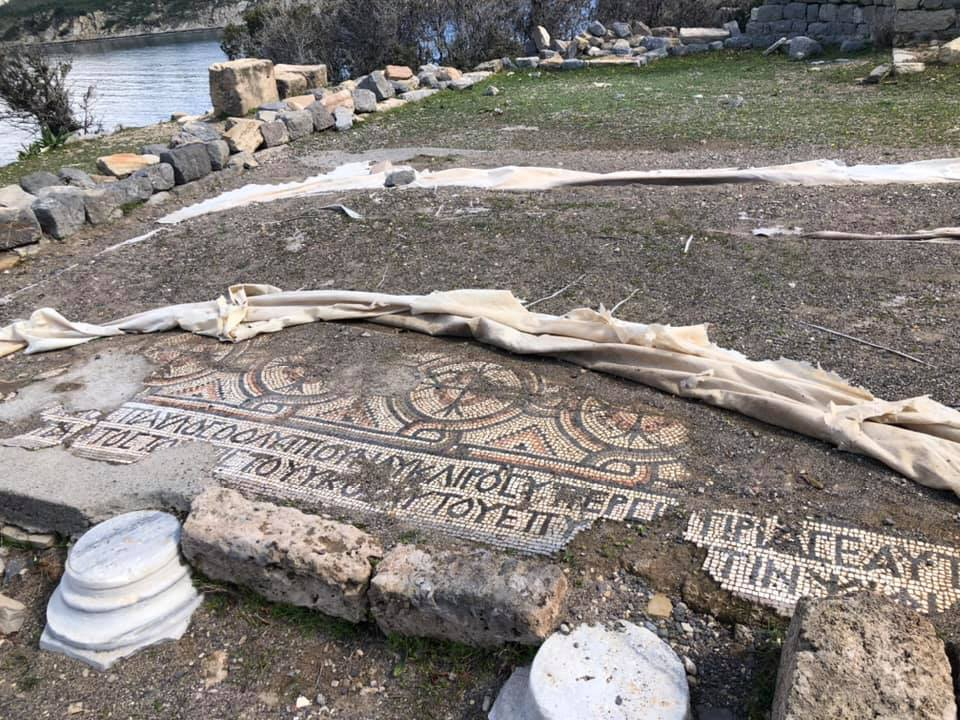
Mosaic from Aphrodisias (Cilicia)

Aphrodisias (Ancient Greek: Ἀφροδισιάς), sometimes called Aphrodisias of Cilicia to distinguish it from the town of the same name in Caria, was a port city of ancient Cilicia whose ruins now lie near Cape Tisan in Mersin Province, Turkey.

== Geography ==
Aphrodisias is situated on Cape Tisan near the town of Yeşilovacık in the rural area of Silifke ilçe (district) which itself is a part of Mersin Province. The ancient name of this region was Cilicia Trachea ("rugged Cilicia") So it is customary to call the ruins Aphrodisias of Cilicia to distinguish it from the better-known Aphrodisias in Aydin Province. The ruins are at the east side of the cape facing Dana Island and Tisan Island. The coordinates of the ruins are 36°09′27″N 33°41′26″E The highway distance to is Silifke 50 kilometres (31 mi) and to Mersin is 133 kilometres (83 mi).

== History ==
The foundation date of the ancient settlement is unknown. But it was a port of Ptolemaic Egypt in the fourth century BC. The settlement was incorporated into the Seleucid Empire and later into the Roman Empire. In the marine book Ps.Skylax written in 101 AD, the settlement was named Cap Aphrodisias . During the early Middle Ages when the port was a part of Byzantine Empire, it was named Porto Cavaliere. Then it faded away. The location of the long forgotten ruins was discovered by Austrian Archaeologist Rudolf Heberdey in 1891.

The famous Greek physician Xenocrates was from Aphrodisias.

== The ruins ==
There are ruins of a necropolis, a cistern, city walls and floor mosaics of a 4th-century church named St. Panteleon (The church was a temple prior to Christianity). In 1987, the German archaeologist Ludwig Budde published his book St. Pantaleon von Aphrodisias in Kılikien about the church. He had studied the remaining architecture as well as the mosaics in the nave and in one side aisle. But many remaining mosaics are not unearthed yet.

== Bibliography ==
- Budde, Ludwig (1987). St. Pantaleon von Aphrodisias in Kilikien [St. Pantaleon from Aphrodisias in Cilicia]. Beiträge zur Kunst des christlichen Ostens, vol. 9. Recklinghausen: Aurel Bongers, ISBN 3-7647-0382-2, on the city in general see pp. 8–19 and plates 1–22.
