= Olive Anderson =

British history professor

Olive Anderson (1927-2016) was professor of history at Westfield College, University of London.

== Life ==
Anderson has been noted for her innovative approach to the writing of military history, which concentrated on the political, administrative, and cultural aspects of conflicts rather than strategy or tactics. In 2017, she featured in a conference, London's Women Historians, held at the Institute of Historical Research.

== Selected publications ==
- "The Political uses of History in Mid Nineteenth-Century England", Past & Present, Vol. 36, Issue 1 (April 1967), pp. 87–105. https://doi.org/10.1093/past/36.1.87
- A Liberal State at War: English Politics and Economics during the Crimean War (1967)
- "The Growth of Christian Militarism in mid-Victorian Britain", English Historical Review, 1971.
- Suicide in Victorian and Edwardian England (1987)
