= Ports of the Ottoman Empire =

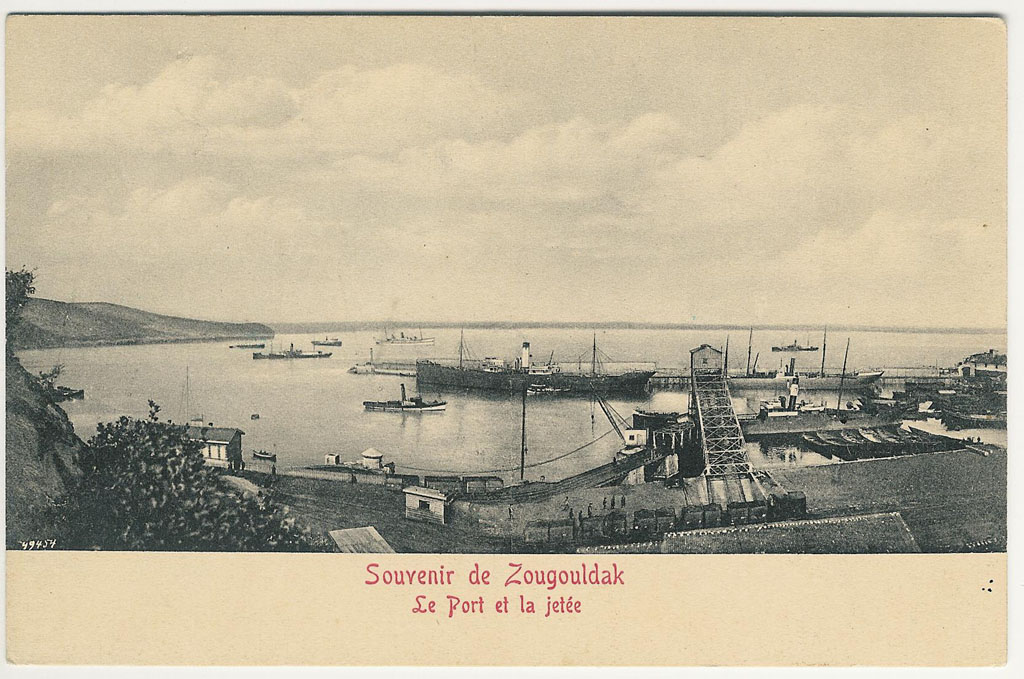
Zonguldak port and breakwater, Turkey Ottoman era postcard

The ports of the Ottoman Empire can be listed by using the Ottoman Empire official annuals, known as salname, after 1847. The list below is about the ports of the empire in 1870. According to the report there were 70 ports (including piers). Among these 3 of them were in Adriatic Sea, 2 in Ionian Sea, 6 in Aegean Sea, 9 in Sea of Marmara, 32 in Mediterranean Sea, 11 in Black Sea, 5 in Red Sea, and 2 in Persian Gulf. (However, in this list Aegean island ports as well as Anatolian ports facing the Aegean Sea were listed together with the Mediterranean ports)

| Ottoman name | Modern name | Present country | Sea |
|---|---|---|---|
| Antivari | Bar | Montenegro | Adriatic Sea |
| Durazzo | Durrës | Albania | Adriatic Sea |
| Avlona | Vlorë | Albania | Adriatic Sea |
| Parga | Parga | Greece | Ionian Sea |
| Preveze | Preveza | Greece | Ionian Sea |
| Makri | Maroneia | Greece | Aegean Sea |
| Aynoz | Enez | Turkey | Aegean Sea |
| Lagoz | Lagos (?) | Greece | Aegean Sea |
| Kavala | Kavala | Greece | Aegean Sea |
| Selanik | Thessaloniki | Greece | Aegean Sea . |
| Volo | Volos | Greece | Aegean sea |
| Istanbul | Istanbul | Turkey | Sea of Marmara |
| Silivri | Silivri | Turkey | Sea of Marmara |
| Ereğli | Marmara Ereğlisi | Turkey | Sea of Marmara |
| Tekfurdağı | Tekirdağ | Turkey | Sea of Marmara |
| Gelibolu | Gelibolu | Turkey | Sea of Marmara |
| Bandırma | Bandırma | Turkey | Sea of Marmara |
| Gemlik | Gemlik | Turkey | Sea of Marmara |
| Mudanya | Mudanya | Turkey | Sea of Marmara |
| İzmit | İzmit | Turkey | Sea of Marmara . |
| Trablusgarp | Tripoli | Libya | Mediterranean Sea |
| Kandiye | Heraklion | Greece | Mediterranean Sea |
| Hanya | Chania | Greece | Mediterranean Sea |
| Retimo | Rethymno | Greece | Mediterranean Sea |
| Islandiya | Dia (?) | Greece | Mediterranean Sea |
| Suda | Souda | Greece | Mediterranean Sea |
| Larnaka | Larnaca | Cyprus | Mediterranean Sea |
| Limizo | Limassol (?) | Cyprus | Mediterranean Sea |
| Rodos | Rhodes | Greece | Mediterranean Sea |
| Simi | Symi | Greece | Mediterranean Sea |
| Siray | Syros (?) | Greece | Mediterranean Sea |
| Harki | Chalki | Greece | Mediterranean Sea |
| İstampali | Astypalaia | Greece | Mediterranean Sea |
| Tilos | Tilos | Greece | Mediterranean Sea |
| Vati | Vathy | Greece | Mediterranean Sea |
| Tigani | Pythagorio | Greece | Mediterranean Sea |
| Midilli | Mytilene | Greece | Mediterranean Sea |
| Sakız | Chios | Greece | Mediterranean Sea |
| İzmir | İzmir | Turkey | Mediterranean Sea |
| Kuşadası | Kuşadası | Turkey | Mediterranean Sea |
| Makri | Fethiye | Turkey | Mediterranean Sea |
| Atalia | Antalya | Turkey | Mediterranean Sea |
| Mersin | Mersin | Turkey | Mediterranean Sea |
| İskenderun | İskenderun | Turkey | Mediterranean Sea |
| Lazkiye | Latakia | Syria | Mediterranean Sea |
| Trablus | Tripoli | Lebanon | Mediterranean Sea |
| Beyrut | Beirut | Lebanon | Mediterranean Sea |
| Sayda | Sidon | Lebanon | Mediterranean Sea |
| Sur | Tyre | Lebanon | Mediterranean Sea |
| Acre | Acre | Israel | Mediterranean Sea . |
| Keyfa | Haifa | Israel | Mediterranean Sea |
| Yafa | Jaffa | Israel | Mediterranean Sea |
| Boğazı'ı Balçık | Balchik | Bulgaria | Black Sea |
| Varna | Varna | Bulgaria | Black Sea |
| Köstence | Constanța | Romania | Black Sea |
| Ereğli | Karadeniz Ereğli | Turkey | Black Sea |
| İnebolu | İnebolu | Turkey | Black Sea |
| Bolu | ? | Turkey | Black Sea |
| Sinop | Sinop | Turkey | Black Sea |
| Samsun | Samsun | Turkey | Black Sea . |
| Giresun | Giresun | Turkey | Black Sea |
| Trabzon | Trabzon | Turkey | Black Sea |
| Batum | Batumi | Georgia | Black Sea |
| Yanbu | Yanbu | Saudi Arabia | Red Sea |
| Cidde | Jeddah | Saudi Arabia | Red Sea |
| Lihye | Al Luḩayyah | Yemen | Red Sea |
| Hudeyde | Al Hudaydah | Yemen | Red Sea |
| Muha | Mocha | Yemen | Red Sea |
| Uceyl | ? | Saudi Arabia | Persian Gulf |
| Basra | Basra | Iraq | Persian Gulf |
