= Taşucu Seka Harbor =

Harbor in Turkey

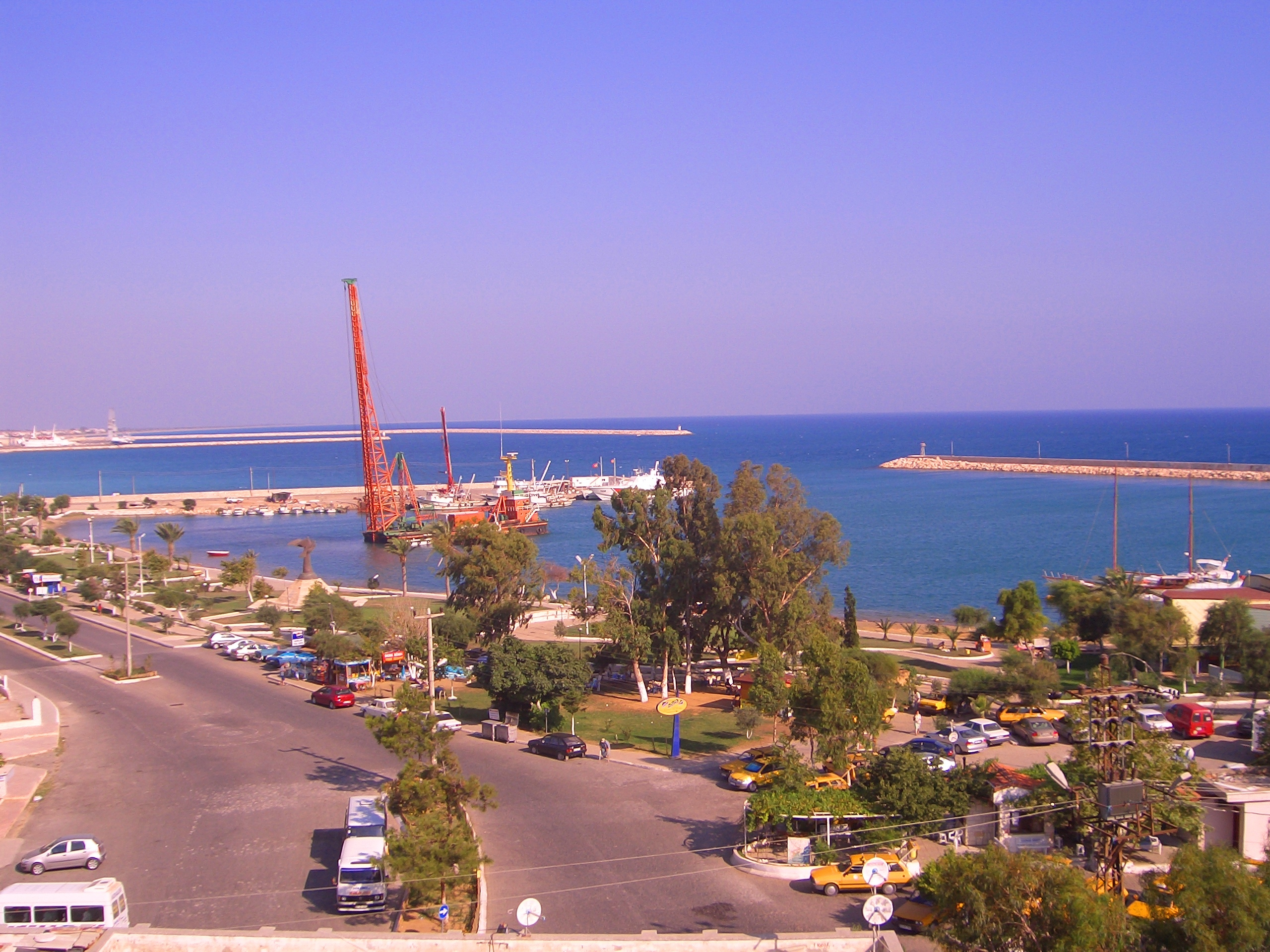
- Taşucu Seka Harbor
- Interactive map of Taşucu Seka Harbor

Location
- Country: Turkey
- Location: Taşucu, Silifke; Mersin Province
- Coordinates: 36°18′33″N 33°53′24″E
- UN/LOCODE: TRTAS

Taşucu Seka Harbor is a harbor in Turkey. Taşucu is a town in Silifke ilçe (district) of Mersin Province. It is situated to the west of the Göksu River, and is the main port of the settlements in the Göksu River valley. Taşucu is the name of the belde (town) and Seka is the name of the paper mill situated next to Taşucu.

== The harbor ==
In the province, Taşucu Seka Harbor is the second biggest harbor after Mersin Harbor. The harbor is composed of two sections. The smaller section in the west was constructed as the harbor of the town and the bigger section in the east was the harbor of the Seka paper mill which is currently out of service. The longer breakwater to the east is at 36°18′33″N 33°53′24″E.
