= Derince =

- District and municipality
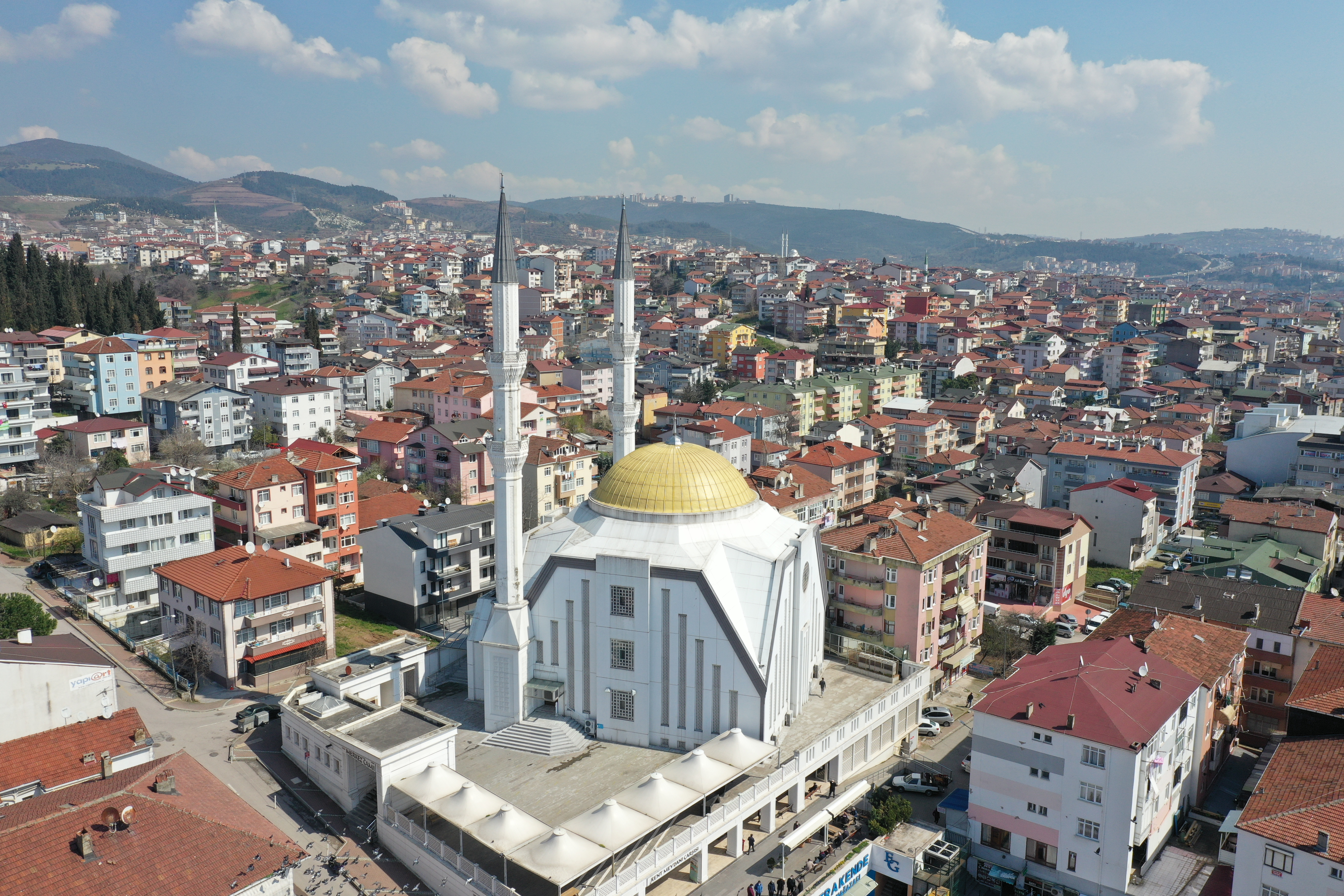

- Map showing Derince District in Kocaeli Province

- Location within Turkey Location within Marmara
- Coordinates: 40°45′14″N 29°49′23″E
- Country: Turkey
- Province: Kocaeli

Government
  - Mayor: Sertif Gökçe (CHP)
- Area: 198 km^{2} (76 sq mi)
- Population (2022): 146,374
  - Density: 739/km^{2} (1,910/sq mi)
- Time zone: UTC+3 (TRT)
- Area code: 0262
- Website: www.derince.bel.tr

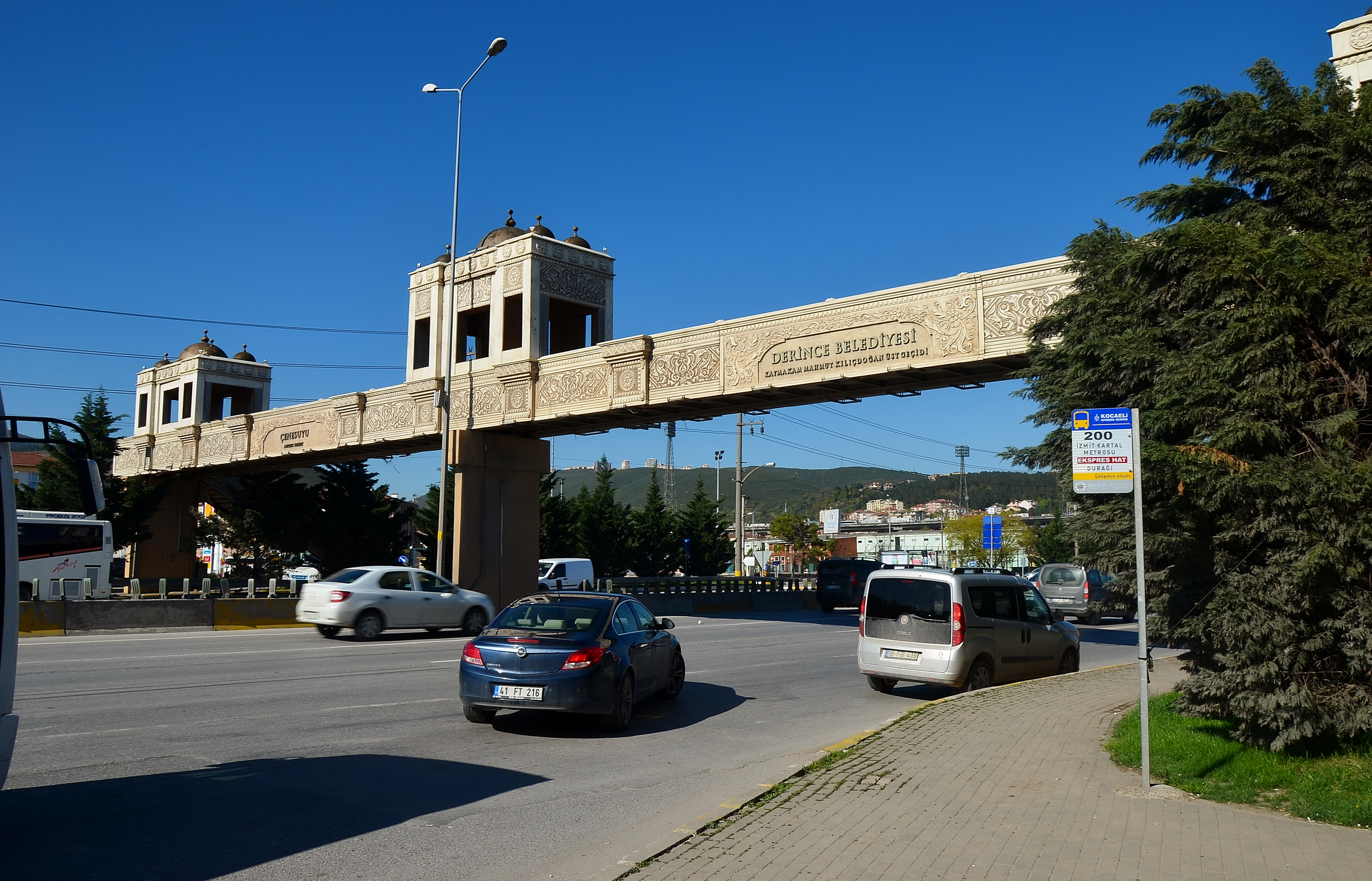
Kaymakam Mahmut Kılıçdoğan Footbridge crossing over state road D.100 in Derince.

Derince is a seaport, municipality and district of Kocaeli Province, Turkey. Its area is 198 km^{2}, and its population is 146,374 (2022). The mayor is Sertif Gökçe (CHP).

Derince Port is one of the few ports in Turkey under government control. The port is operated by the Turkish State Railways (TCDD). Having one of the biggest storage area in the region, the port is widely used for finished vehicle product transportation.

Derince is one of the few ports with railway connection in that area, and has the longest rail network within the port. Two rail ferry services use Derince Port, Tekirdağ-Derince operated by TCDD and Derince-Chornomorsk/Poti operated by Bati Wagon.

The port is in the privatization list of Privatization Administration. The privatization process had restarted in October 2013. Six companies had offered for Derince Port, but the tender process was cancelled when none of them continued in the public auction.

== Composition ==
There are 17 neighbourhoods in Derince District:

- Çavuşlu
- Çenedağ
- Çınarlı
- Deniz
- Dumlupınar
- Fatih Sultan
- Geredeli
- İbni Sina
- Karagöllü
- Kaşıkçı
- Mersincik
- Sırrıpaşa
- Tahtalı
- Terziler
- Toylar
- Yavuzsultan
- Yenikent

== Sport ==
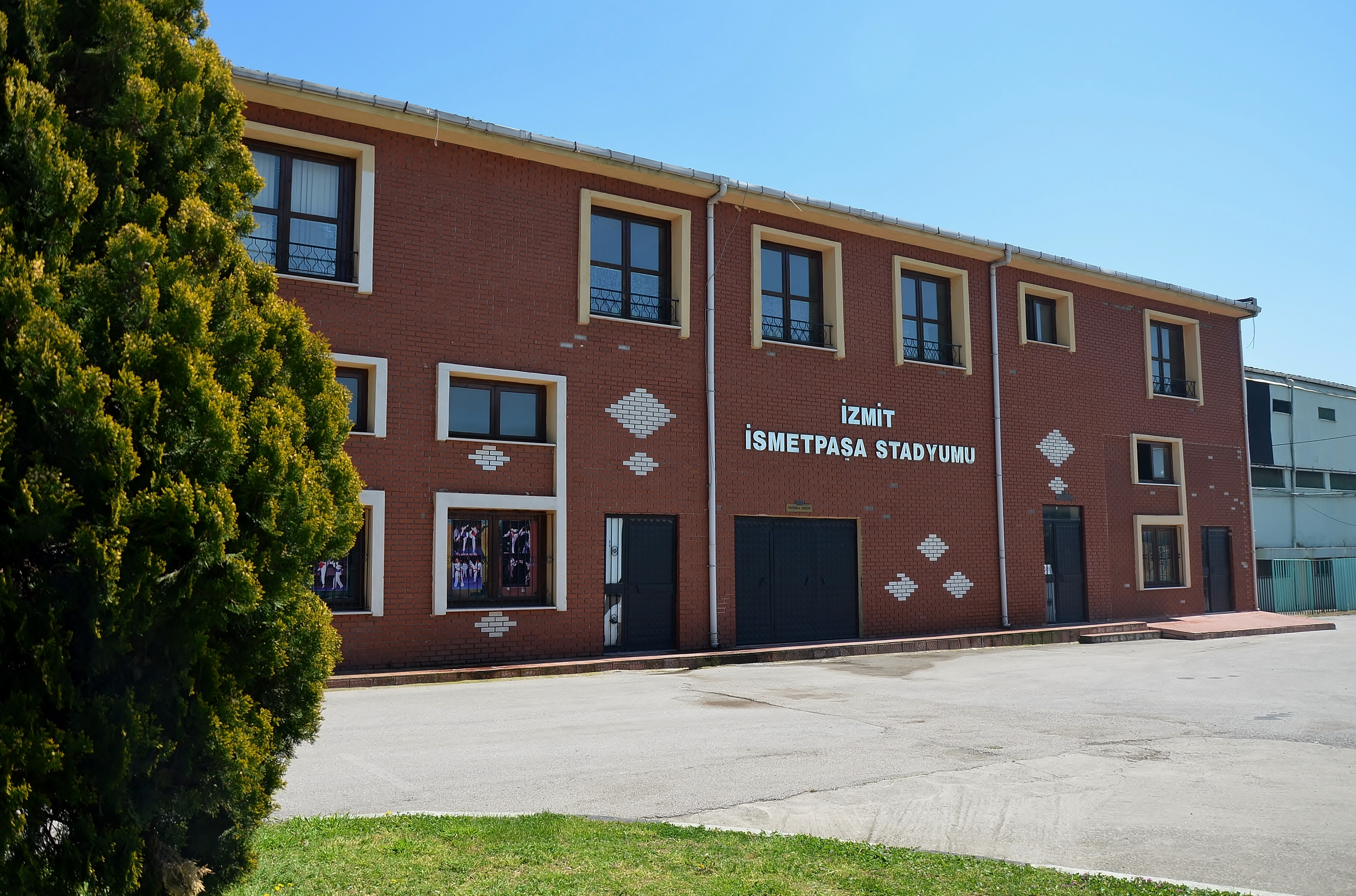
İzmit İsmetpaşa Stadium.

The İzmit İsmetpaşa Stadium was located in Derince.

Derince Belediyespor Women's play in the Turkish Women's First Football League since the 2012–13 season. They finished the 2013–14 season in the third place.

== Twin towns — sister cities ==
Derince is twinned with:

- Daegu, South Korea
- Formosa, Argentina, Argentina
- Yevpatoria, Ukraine
