= Yeşilovacık =

Town in Turkey

Yeşilovacık Hacıisaklı
- Neighbourhood
- Location in Turkey
- Coordinates: 36°12′N 33°40′E
- Country: Turkey
- Province: Mersin
- District: Silifke
- Elevation: 10 m (33 ft)
- Population (2022): 3,877
- Time zone: UTC+3 (TRT)
- Postal code: 33900
- Area code: 0324

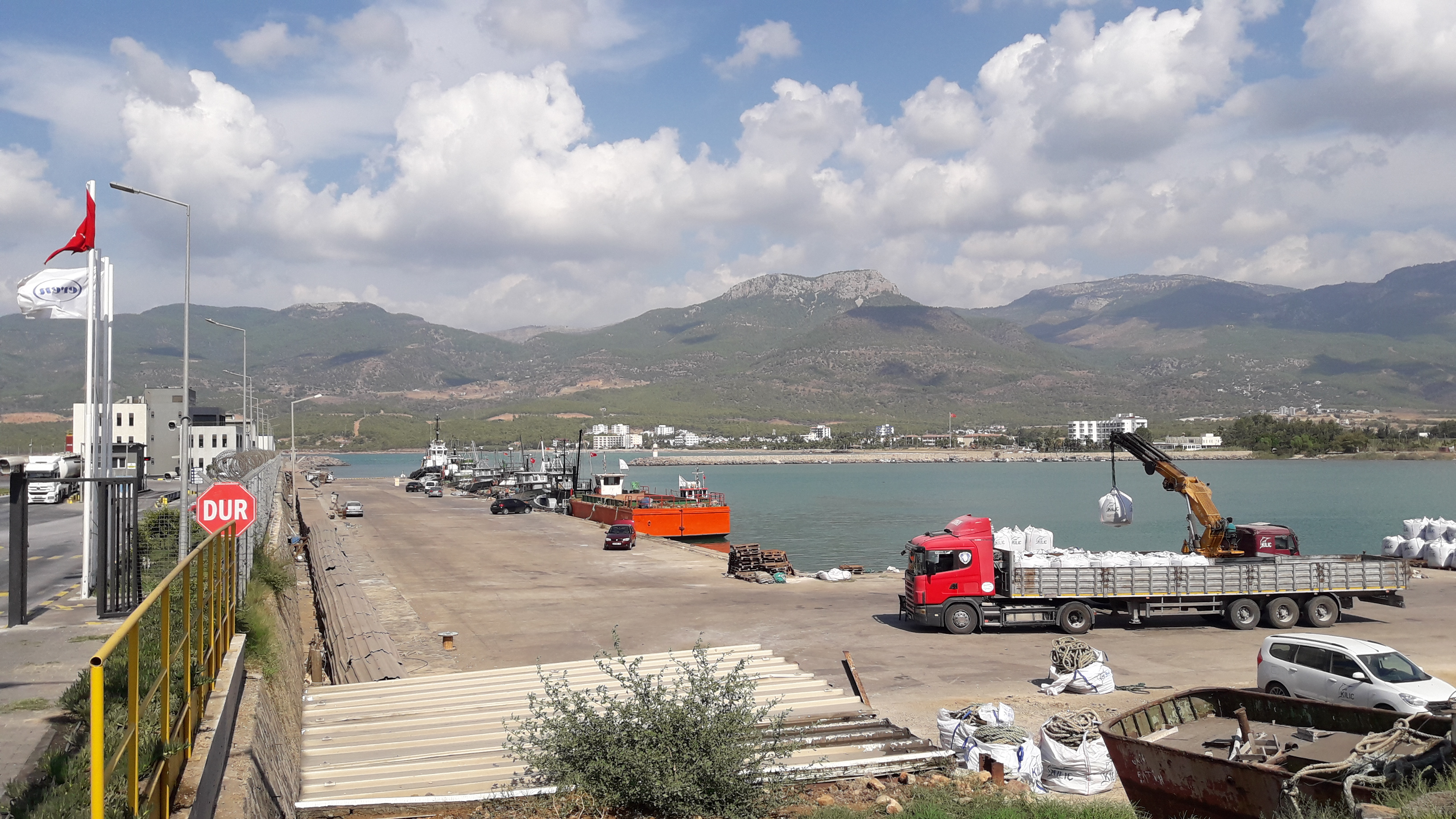
Yeşilovacık harbor, Turkey

Yeşilovacık (former Hacıisaklı) is a neighbourhood in the municipality and district of Silifke, Mersin Province, Turkey. Its population is 3,877 (2022). Before the 2013 reorganisation, it was a town (belde).

== Geography ==
Yeşilovacık is a Mediterranean coastal town. The town is on the state highway D.400. It is west of both Silifke and Mersin; the highway distance to Silifke is 42 kilometres (26 mi) and to Mersin 124 kilometres (77 mi). The area both east and the north is covered with pine forests. The west of the town is a wide sand beach.

== Economy ==
Both fishing and agriculture, especially greenhouse agriculture play important roles in the economy of Yeşilovacık. Apricots, plums, grapes and almonds are among the more important crops. Although touristic potential is great, at the moment, tourism plays only a minor role in the economy. (Only one holiday village) There is a little harbour for fishermen.

== History ==
The ruins of Aphrodisias of Cilicia (not to be confused with the better known ancient settlement in Aydın Province) are on a cape a few kilometers east of Yeşilovacık. These ruins, now called Tisan, date back to 7th century BC of Hellenistic age. During the last years of Seleucid Empire Aphrodisias lost its former importance. In 1210 Leo I, the king of Lesser Armenia sold this town to Knights Hospitaller. The knights renamed the city as Porto Cabalieri. However, this medieval town didn’t survive.
