= Villa rustica =

Countryside farmhouse or villa during the Roman era

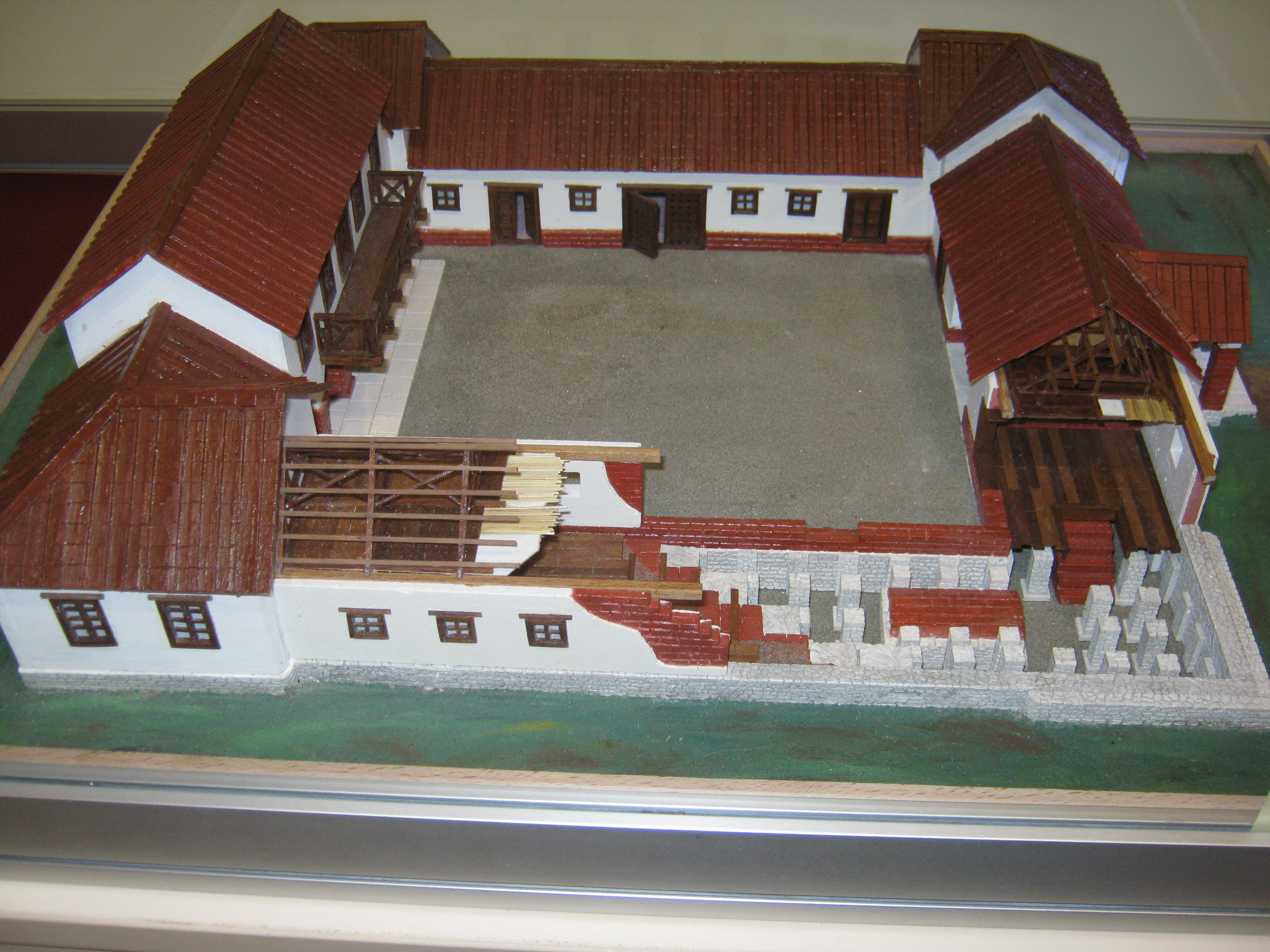
Scale model of a Roman villa rustica. Remains of villas of this type have been found in the vicinity of Valjevo, Serbia.

Villa rustica (transl. farmhouse or countryside villa) was the term used by the ancient Romans to denote a farmhouse or villa set in the countryside and with an agricultural section, which applies to the vast majority of Roman villas. In some cases, they were at the center of a large agricultural estate, sometimes called a latifundium. The adjective rustica was used only to distinguish it from a much rarer sub-urban resort villa, or otium villa built for purely leisure and luxury and typically located in the Bay of Naples. The villa rustica would thus serve both as a residence of the landowner and his family (and servants) and also as a farm management center. It would often comprise separate buildings to accommodate farm laborers and sheds and barns for animals and crops.

The villa rustica's design differed, but usually it consisted of two parts; the pars urbana (main house), and the pars rustica (farm area).

== List of villae rusticae ==
=== Austria ===
- Villa Rustica (Altheim-Weirading), Altheim, Austria

=== Bosnia-Herzegovina ===
- Mogorjelo

=== Bulgaria ===
- Villa Armira, Ivaylovgrad

=== Italy ===
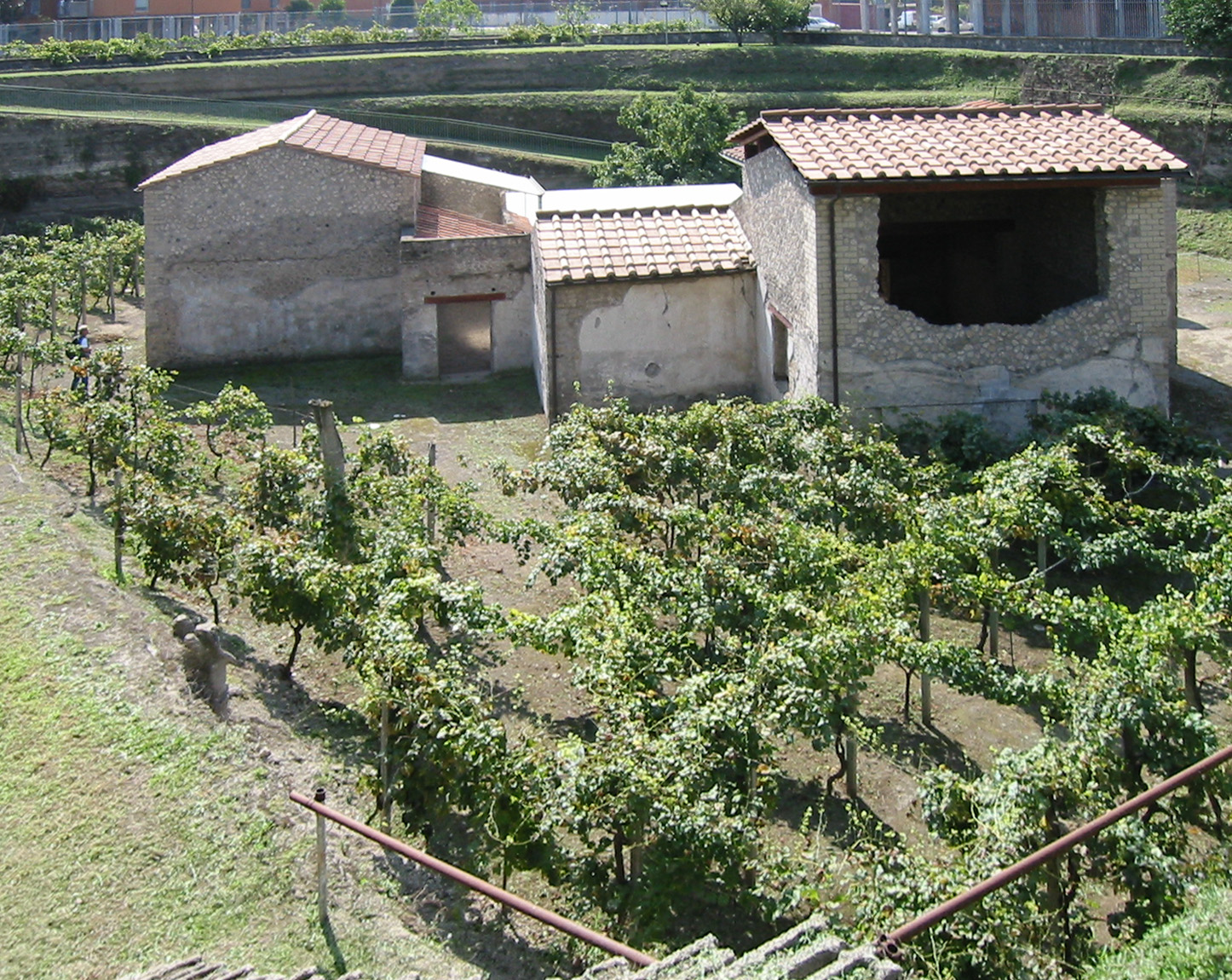
Boscoreale villa

- Villa Boscoreale

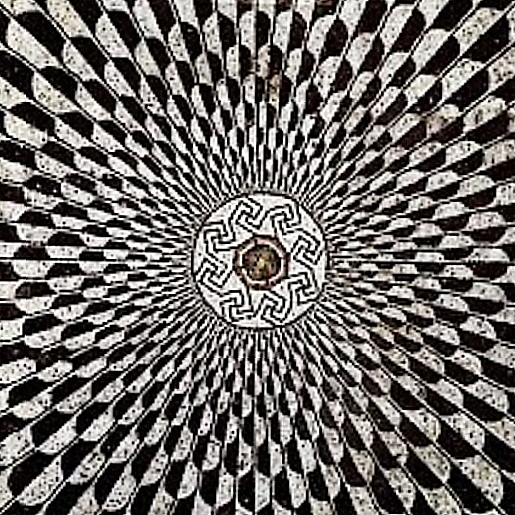
Mosaic floor at Villa dei Volusii

- Villa dei Volusii, Fiano Romano

=== Portugal ===
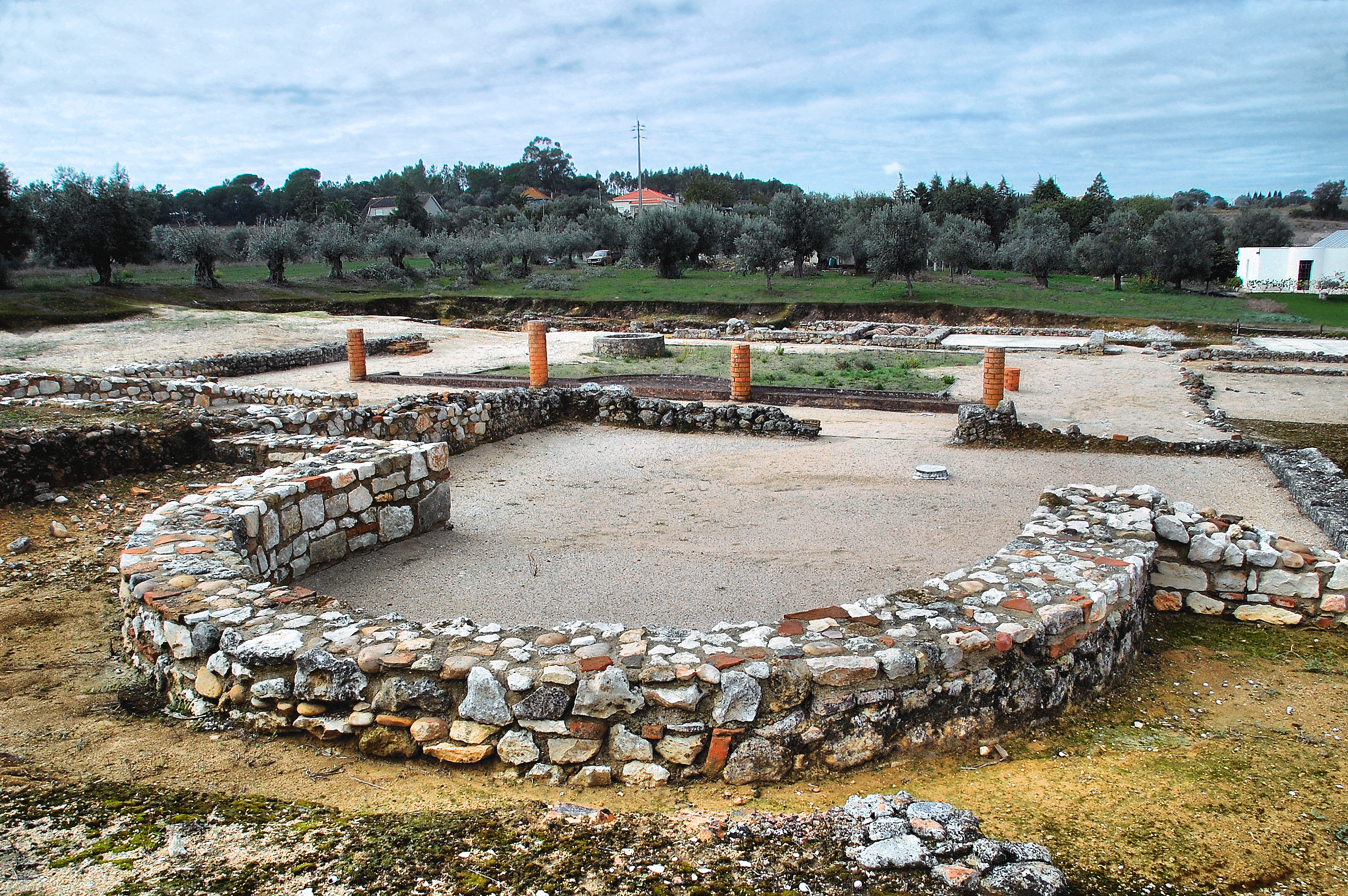
Villa of Torre de Palma

- Boca do Rio
- Castelo da Lousa
- Villa of Fonte do Milho
- Roman Villa of Rabaçal
- Roman ruins of Quinta da Abicada
- Centum Cellas
- Villa of Torre de Palma
- Villa of Cerro da Vila
- Roman ruins of Pisões
- Roman ruins of São Cucufate
- Roman Ruins of Milreu (Estoi)
- Roman Villa of Sendim

=== Turkey ===
- Gökkale
- Üçayaklı ruins

=== United Kingdom ===
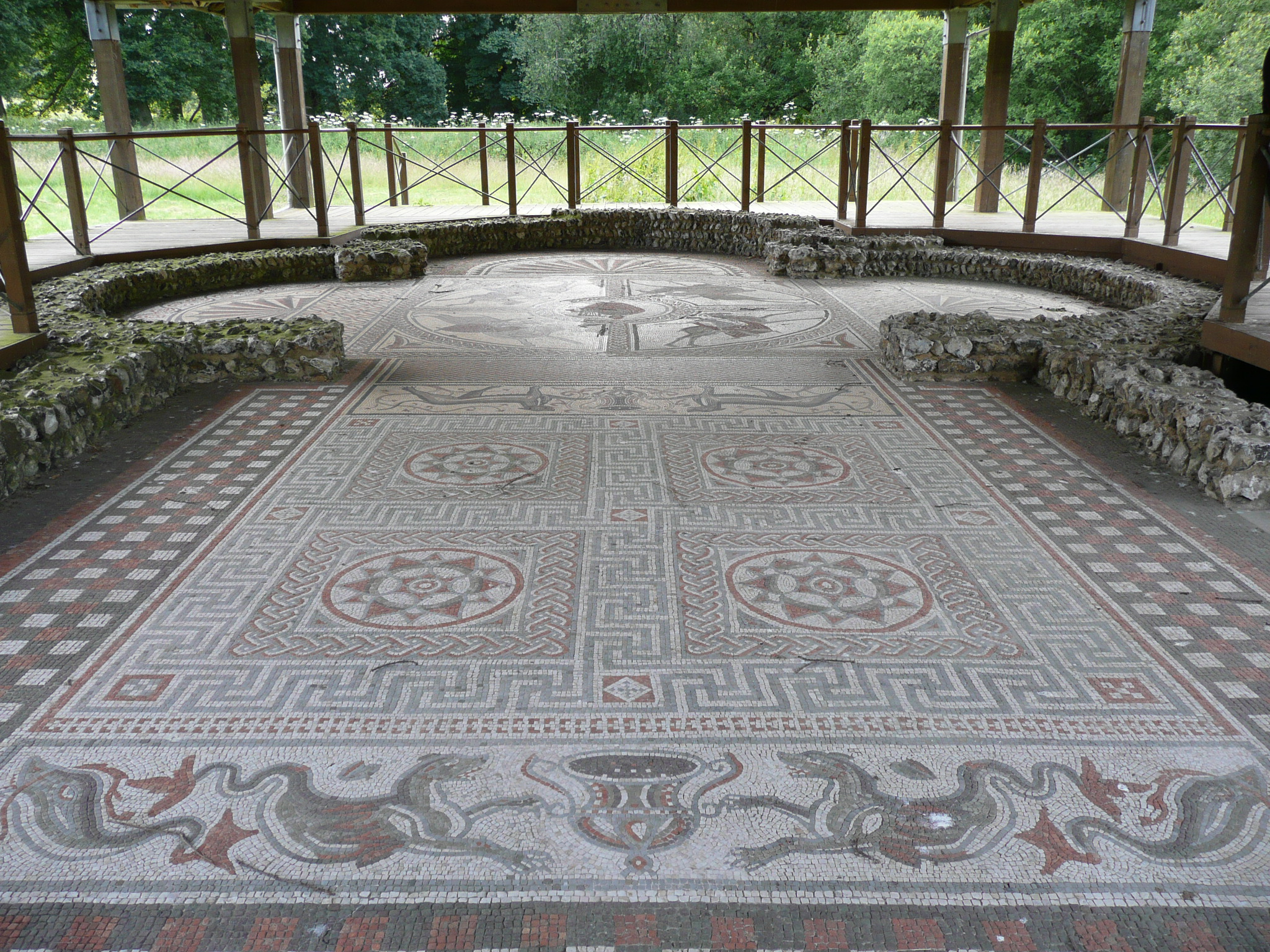
Orpheus mosaic at Littlecote Roman Villa

- Bignor Roman Villa
- Borough Hill Roman villa
- Brading Roman Villa
- Chedworth Roman Villa
- Crofton Roman Villa
- Fishbourne Roman Palace
- Gadebridge Park Roman Villa
- Littlecote Roman Villa
- Llantwit Major Roman Villa
- Low Ham Roman Villa
- Lullingstone Roman Villa
- Newport Roman Villa
- North Leigh Roman Villa
- Piddington Roman Villa
- Woodchester Roman Villa

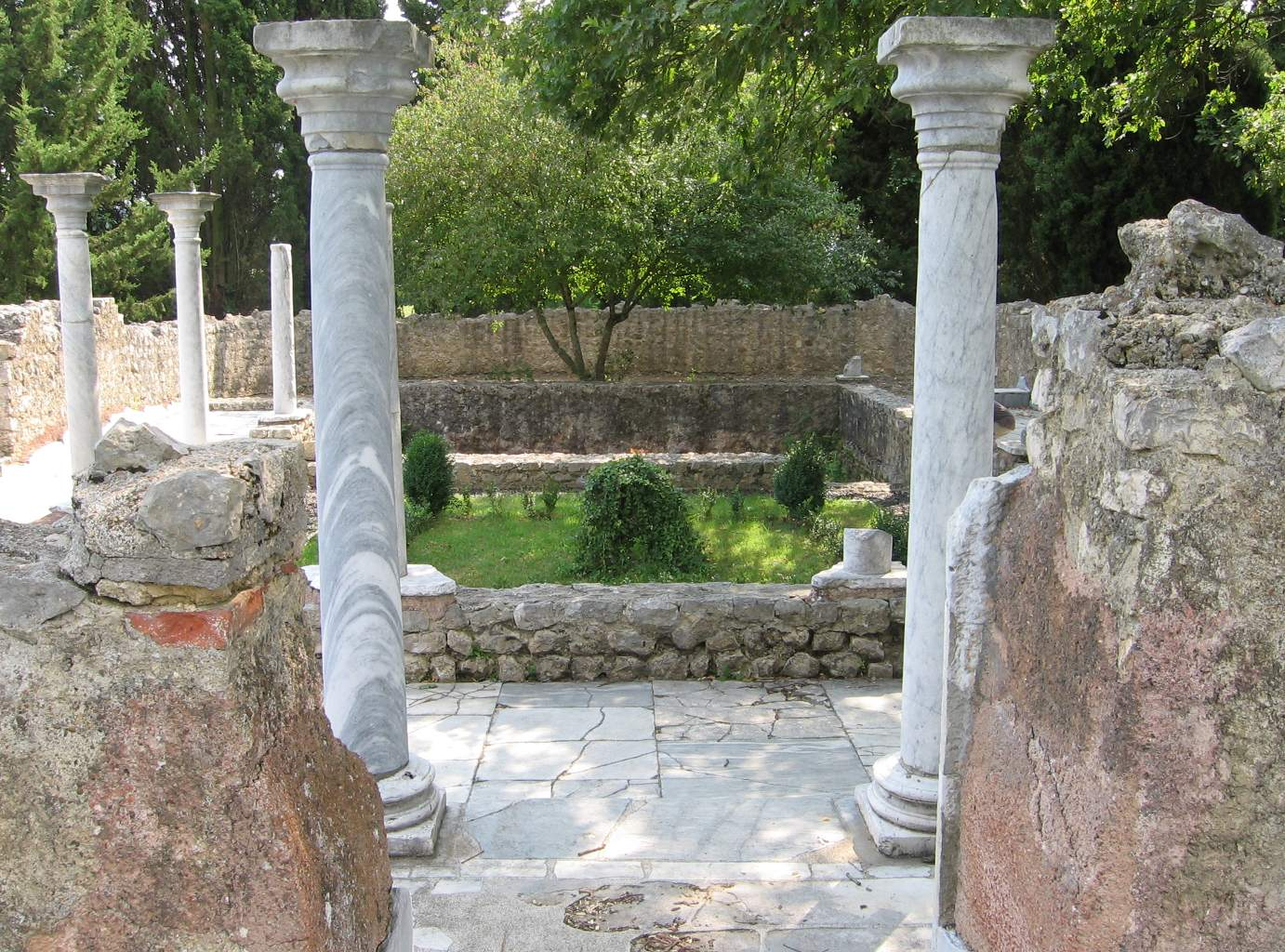
Ruins of the Villa rustica, Montmaurin

=== France ===
- Villa Rustica, Coustaty
- Villa Rustica, Lussas-et-Nontronneau
- Villa Rustica, Montcaret
- Montmaurin
- Villa Rustica, Petit-Bersac
- Villa Rustica, Pièce de Rance

=== Germany ===
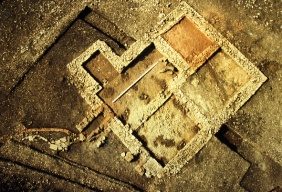
Wurmlingen

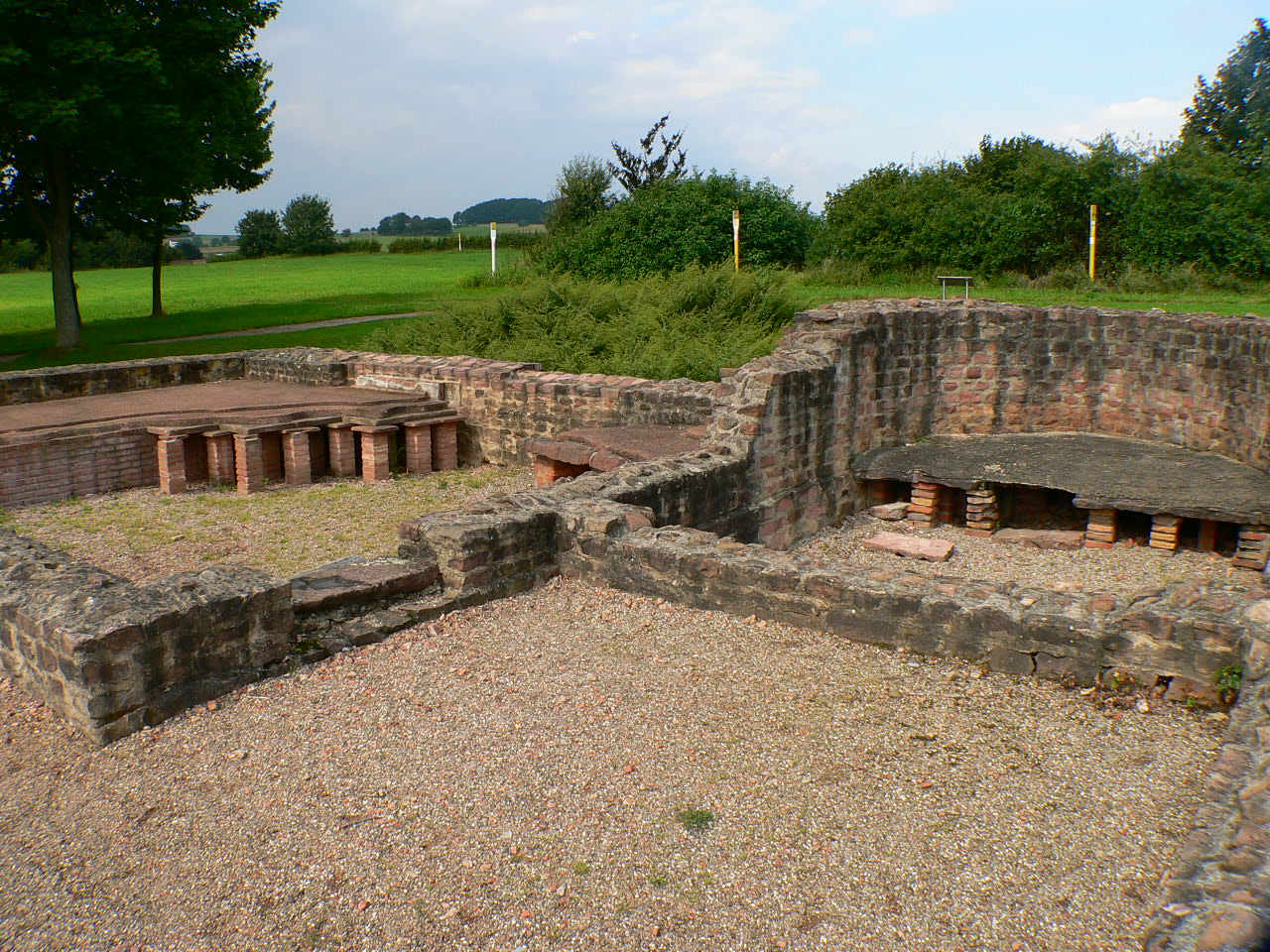
Villa rustica, Haselburg at Höchst i. Odw., Hypocaust of the main building

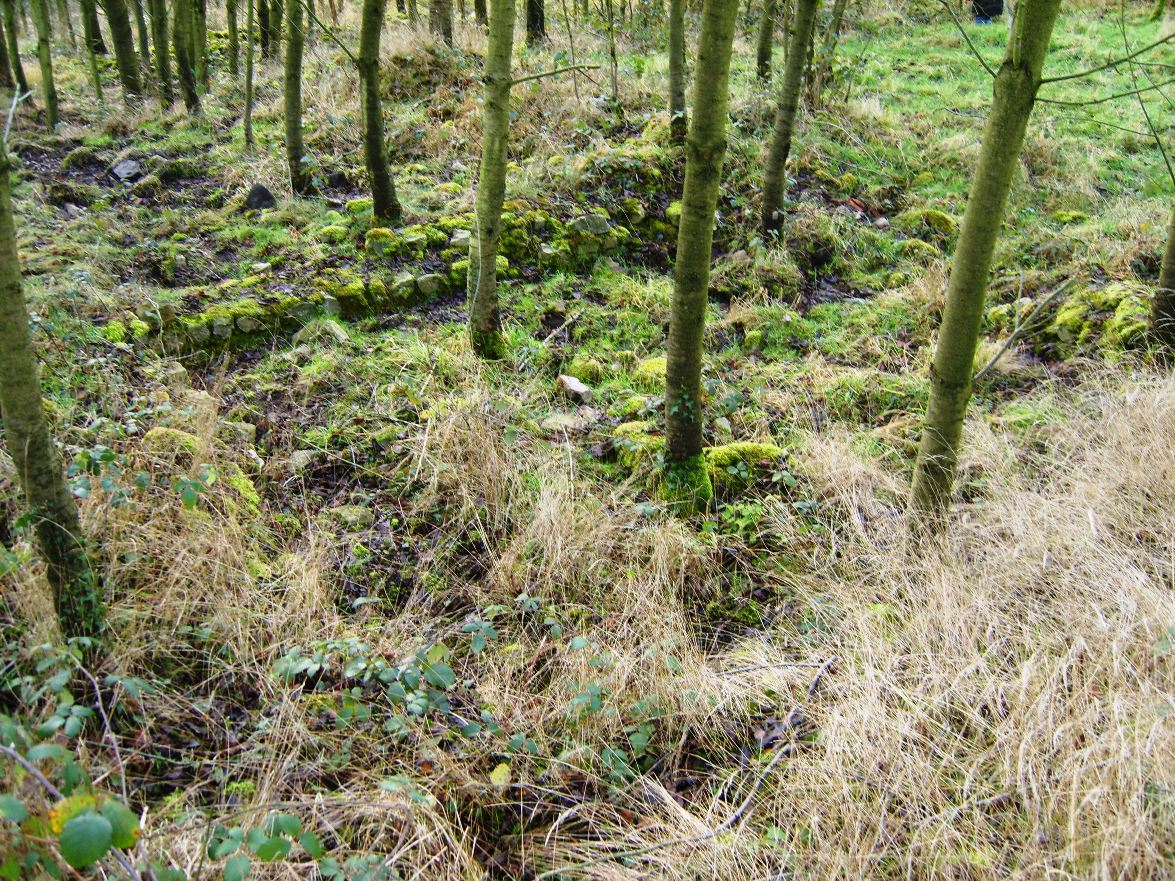
Eschweiler

Baden-Württemberg

- Villa Rustica, Baden-Baden-Haueneberstein, Roman settlement at Wohlfahrtsberg
- Villa Rustica at Bondorf, Böblingen
- Villa rustica at Büßlingen, Konstanz
- Villa Rustica (Brombach), Lörrach
- Villa Rustica at Eigeltingen
- Villa Rustica at Gaggenau-Bad Rotenfels / Oberweier
- Villa urbana at Grenzach-Wyhlen (Museum Römervilla)
- Villa rustica at Hechingen-Stein, Zollernalbkreis
- Villa urbana at Heitersheim
- Villa Rustica (Meßkirch), Sigmaringen
- Villa Rustica at Hirschberg
- Villa Rustica (Inzigkofen), Sigmaringen
- Villa Rustica at Karlsruhe-Durlach
- Villa Rustica at Langenau
- Villa Rustica (Laucherthal), Sigmaringen
- Villa Rustica (Lauffen), Heilbronn
- Villa Rustica at Mühlacker
- Villa Rustica at Nagold
- Villa Rustica (Nürtingen)
- Villa Rustica at Oberndorf-Bochingen
- Villa Rustica (Rommelshausen), Rems-Murr-Kreis
- Römerbad (Weinsberg), Heilbronn
- Villa Rustica (Wiesenbach/Baden), Rhein-Neckar-Kreis
- Römisches Bad (Wurmlingen), Tuttlingen
- Villa Rustica (Zimmerhof), Heilbronn
- Villa Rustica Bietigheim-Weilerlen at Bietigheim-Bissingen, Ludwigsburg

Bavaria

- Villa Rustica (Burgweinting)
- Villa rustica (Denning), Stadt München
- Villa Rustica (Friedberg)
- Villa Rustica at Großberghofen, Dachau
- Villa Rustica (Holheim), Donau-Ries
- Villa Rustica at Hüssingen
- Villa Rustica Kohlhunden, Ostallgäu
- Villa Rustica (Leutstetten), Stadt Starnberg
- Villa Rustica (Möckenlohe) (Naturpark Altmühltal)
- Villa Rustica (Nassenfels), Eichstätt
- Villa Rustica (Niederndorf), Freising
- Villa Rustica (Oberndorf)
- Villa Rustica (Oberhaunstadt), Ingolstadt
- Villa Rustica (Peiting), Weilheim-Schongau
- Villa Rustica (Stadtbergen)
- Villa Rustica (Zipfwang), Oberallgäu

Hesse

- Groß-Umstadt-Heubach, Wamboltsches Schlösschen
- Haselburg Roman villa, Odenwald
- Rodau, Zwingenberg, "Kleine Weide"

Northrhine-Westphalia

- Villa rustica (Blankenheim (Ahr))
- Villae Rusticae at Eschweiler, Aachen
- Propsteier Villa, Eschweiler, Aachen
- Villae Rusticae near Hambach surface mine, Düren
- Villa rustica (Nettersheim-Roderath) at Sollig, Nettersheim-Roderath, Euskirchen

Rheinland-Palatine

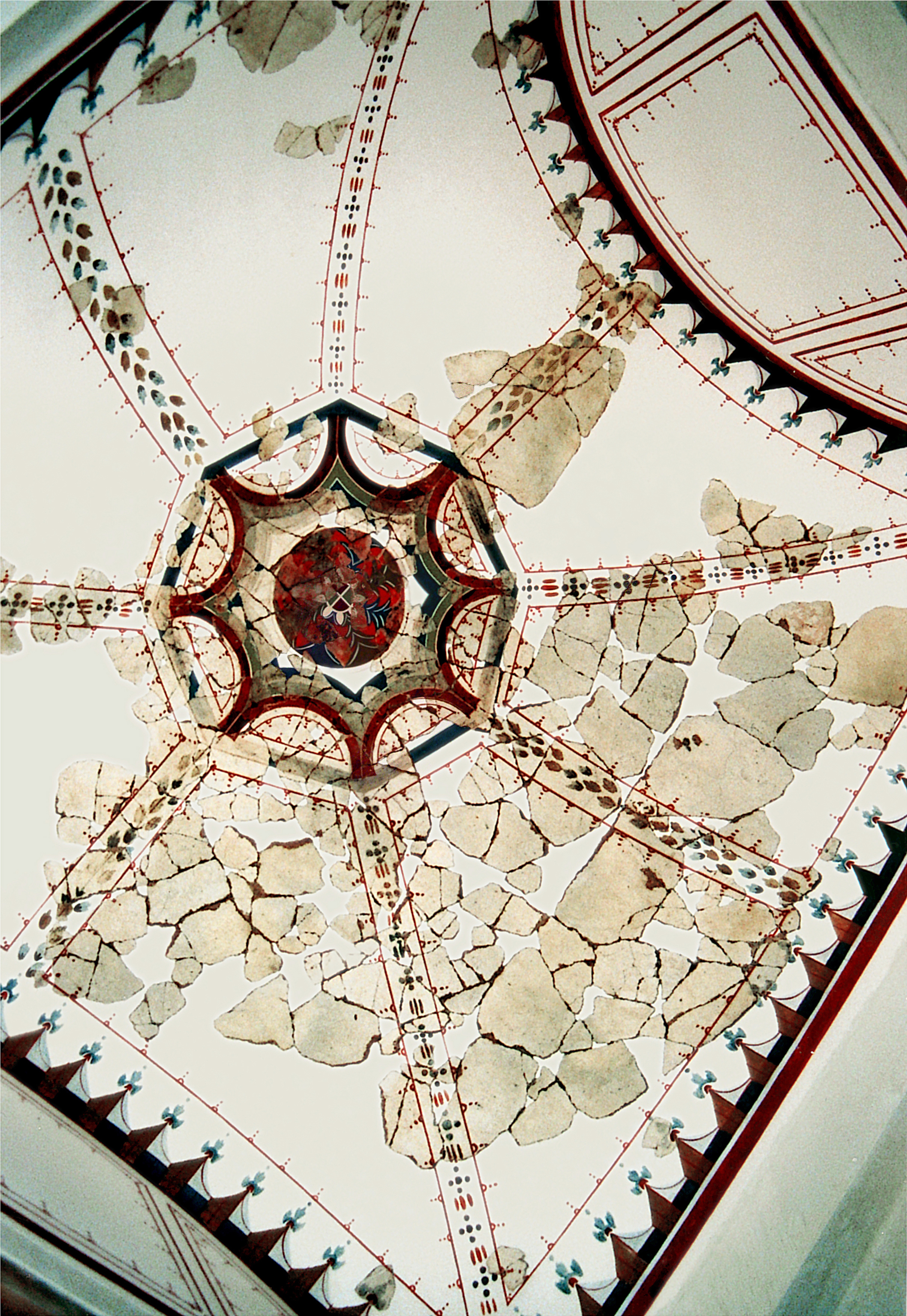
Ceiling painting at the Roman villa of Bad Neuenahr-Ahrweiler

- Villa rustica Weilberg, Bad Dürkheim-Ungstein
- Römerhalle (Bad Kreuznach), Bad Kreuznach
- Roman Villa of Bad Neuenahr-Ahrweiler
- Villa rustica (Bollendorf), Eifelkreis Bitburg-Prüm
- Villa Otrang, Fließem, Eifelkreis Bitburg-Prüm
- Villa Rustica at Sarresdorf (Gerolstein)
- Villa Rustica (Kempten bei Bingen), Mainz-Bingen
- Villa Rustica at Herschweiler-Pettersheim, Kusel
- Roman estate at Lösnich
- Villa Urbana in Longuich
- Villa Rustica (Mehring) (Mosel), Trier-Saarburg
- Villa rustica (Wachenheim)
- Villa Rustica (Weiler bei Bingen), Mainz-Bingen
- Villa rustica (Wasserliesch), Trier-Saarburg

Saarland

- Roman Villa Borg
- Reinheim
- Roman villa at Nennig

=== Serbia ===
- Village Gornja Bukovica.Valjevo, villa rustica IV century A.D.

=== Switzerland ===
Aargau

- Villa Rustica (Bellikon)
- Villa Rustica (Oberentfelden)
- Villa Rustica (Oberlunkhofen)
- Villa rustica (Zofingen)

Basel-Landschaft

- Villa Rustica (Bennwil)
- Villa Rustica (Munzach)

Genf

- Villa Rustica (Bernex)

Jura

- Villa Rustica (Vicques JU)

Solothurn

- Villa rustica (Biberist-Spitalhof)
- Villa rustica (Breitholz)

Waadt

- Villa romaine du Prieuré

Zürich

- Irgenhausen Castrum (built on the remains of a former villa rustica)
- Villa in Wetzikon - Kempten
- Villa Rustica (Buchs)
- Villa Rustica (Kloten)
- Villa Rustica (Oberweningen)
- Villa Rustica (Seeb)
