= Roman villa of Sendim =

The Roman villa of Sendim is located in Lugar do Agrelo, a village in Sendim, in the municipality of Felgueiras, in the district of Porto, Portugal. It was built in the fourth century, located on a platform overlooking a small valley, near the Vizela River basin.

Villa Romana de Sendim is a villa rustica. The dwellings have opus signinum floors and polychrome (tessellas yellow, black, red and white) mosaics with geometric motifs. The archaeological material from excavations is very varied, consisting of thousands of common use ceramic fragments for the kitchen and table, luxurious ceramics, glass, metals and bronze coins.

In December 1994, it was classified as a Property of Public Interest.

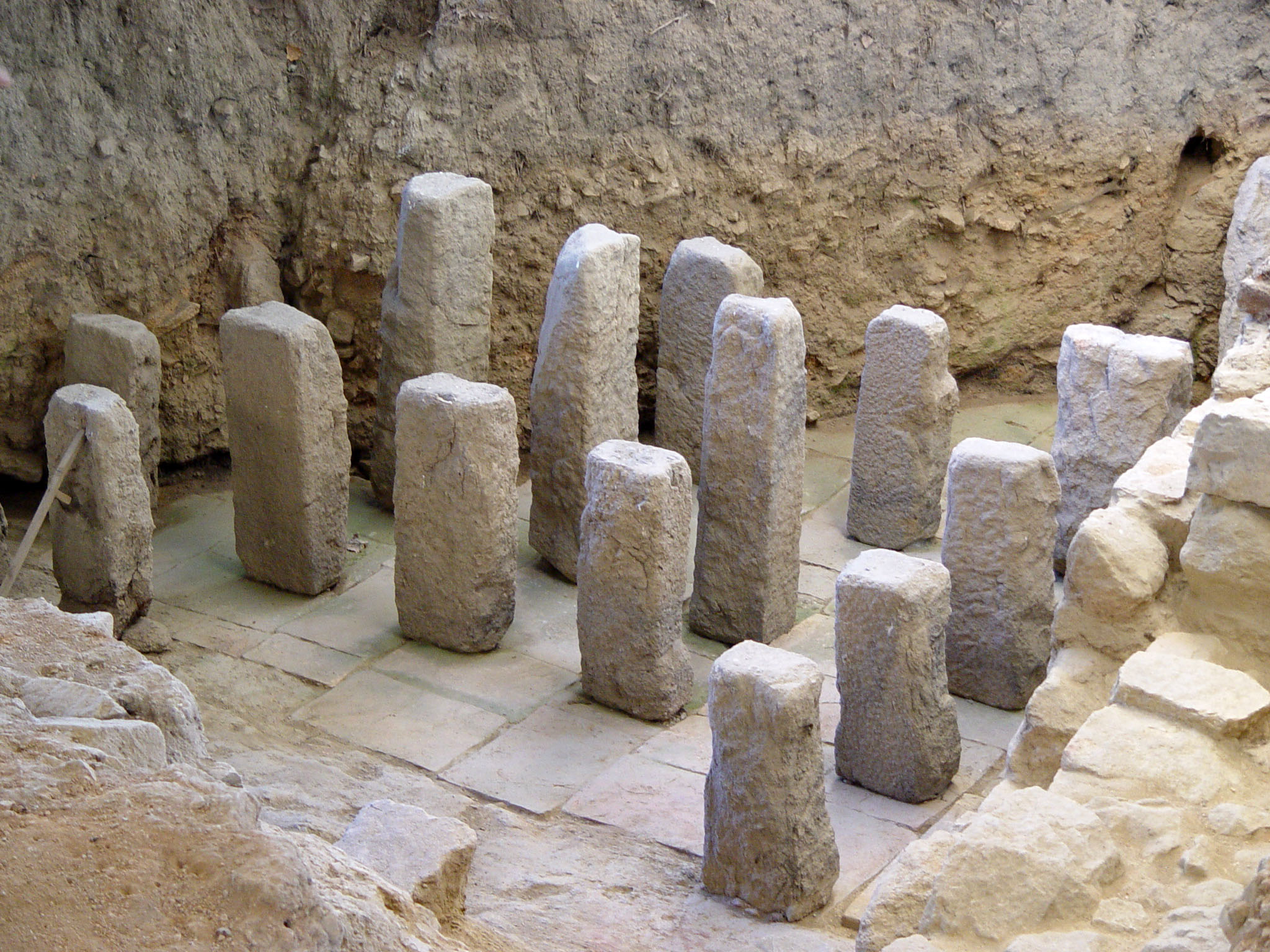
Hypocaust

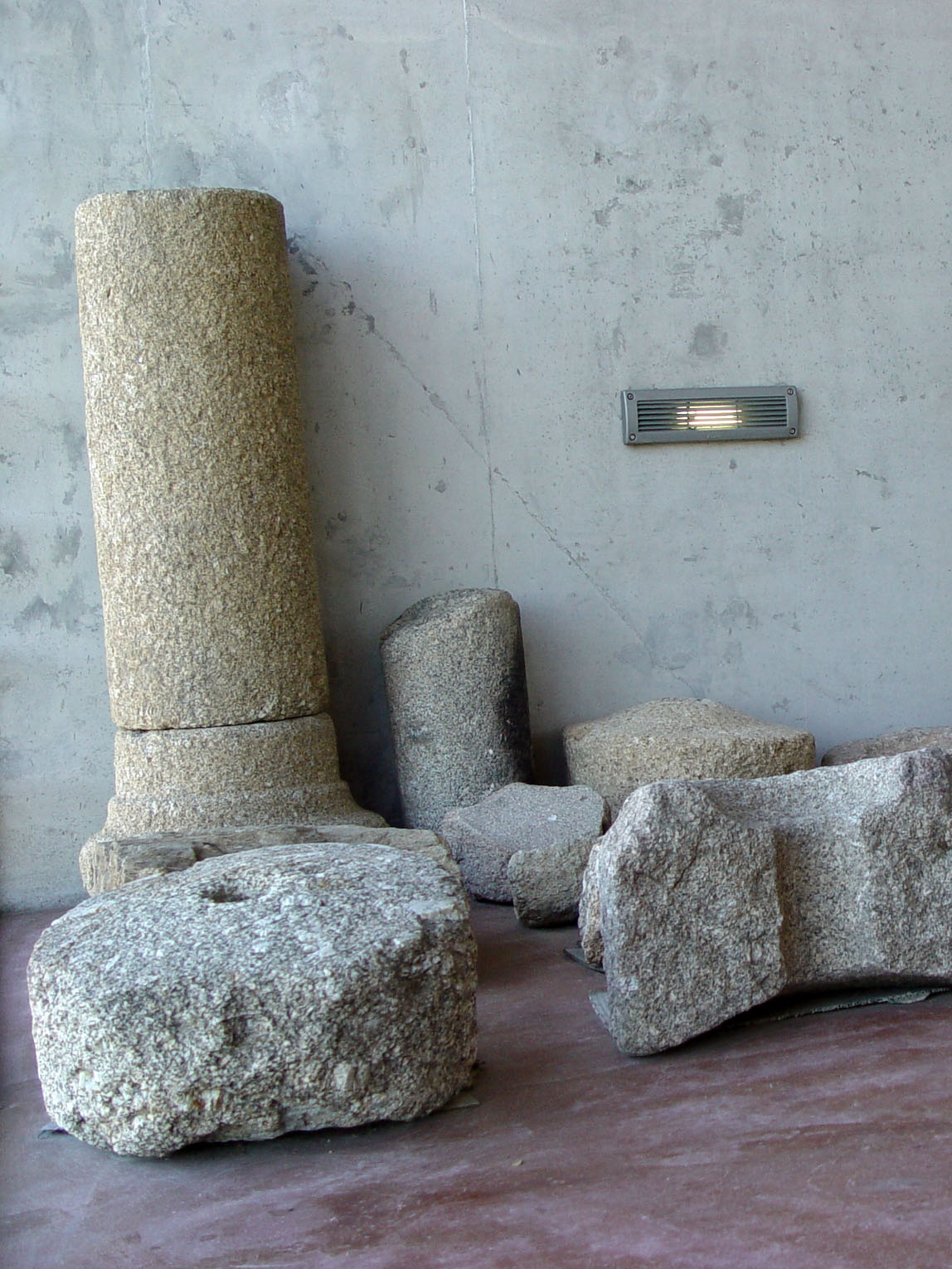

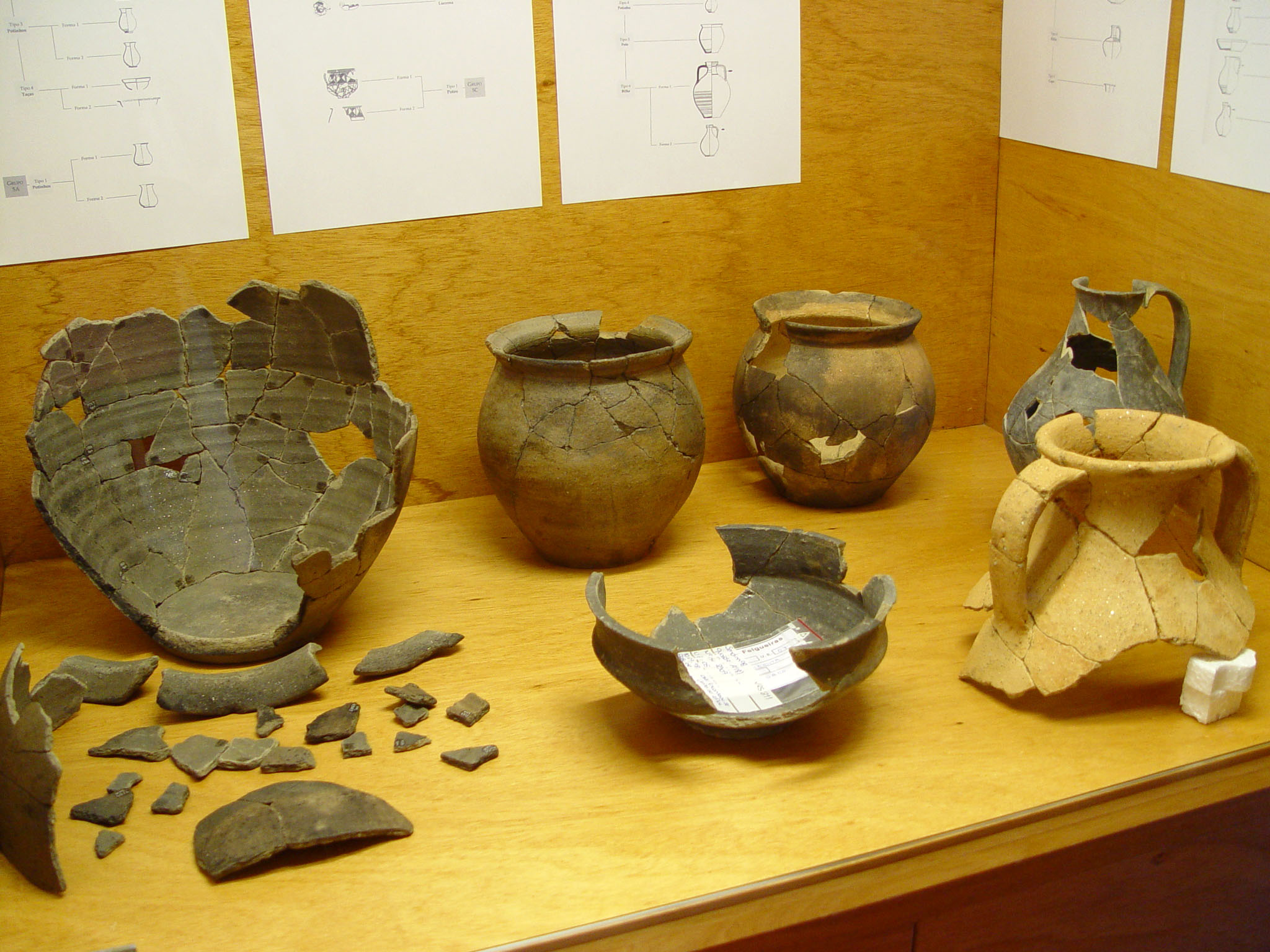
Finds
