= Roman ruins of São Cucufate =

Ruins of the Convent of São Cucufate
- Archaeological Ruins of São Cucufate
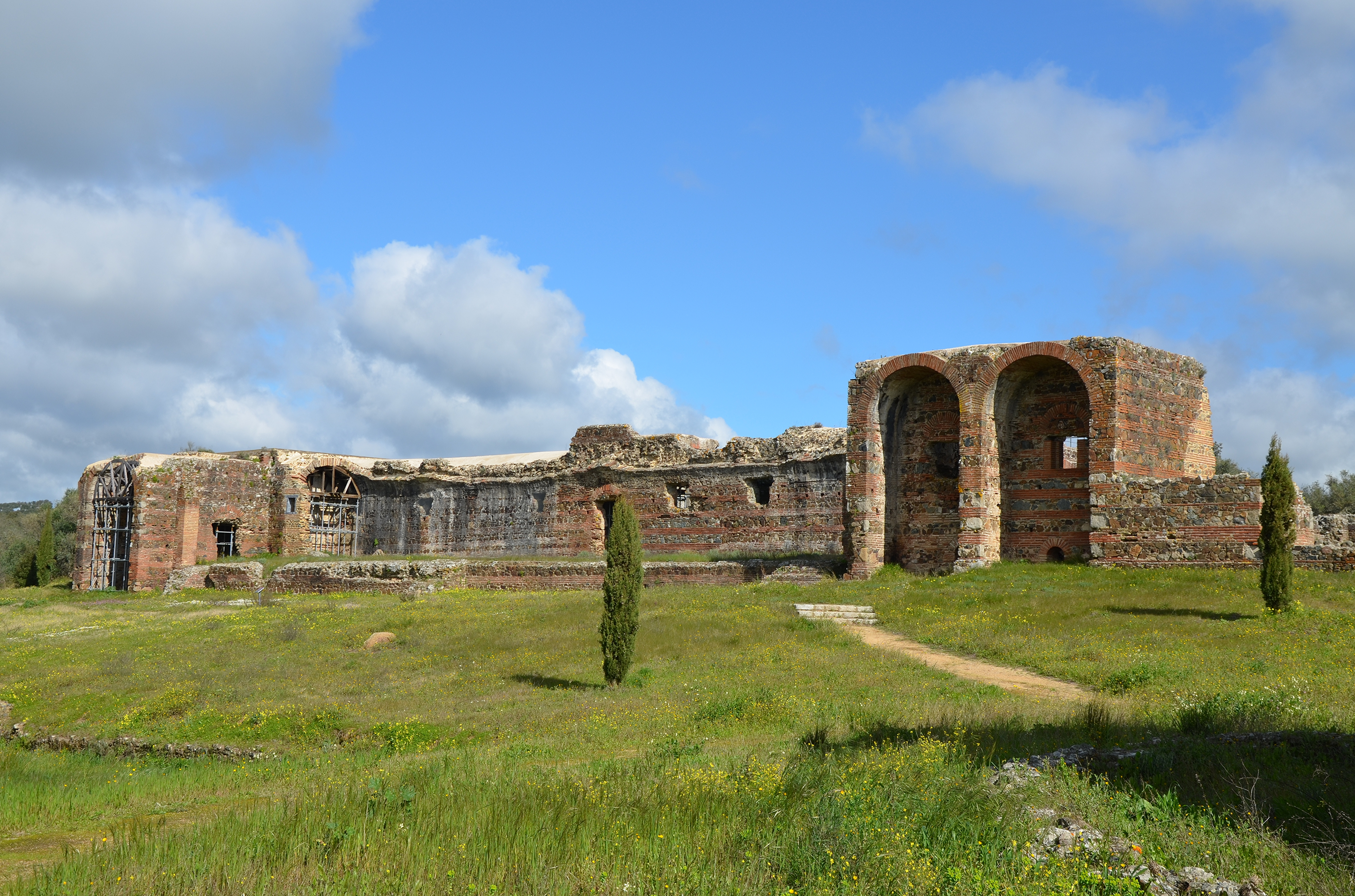
- Interactive map of Ruins of the Convent of São Cucufate
- 38°13′24″N 7°50′43″W
- Type: Ruins
- Location: Beja, Baixo Alentejo, Alentejo, Portugal

Site notes
- Elevation: 250 m (820 ft)
- Length: 115.12 m (377.7 ft)
- Width: 169.93 m (557.5 ft)
- Archaeologists: unknown
- Owner: Portuguese Republic
- Public access: Public Dirt road, off of EN258 (Vidigueira-Alvito), one kilometre from the civil parish seat of Vila de Frades

The Roman ruins of São Cucufate (alternately the Roman ruins of the Villa of São Cucufate, Ruins of Santiago, Archaeological ruins of São Cucufate, or Roman villa of São Áulica) is an ancient archaeological site on the ruins of a Roman-era agricultural farm in the civil parish of Vila de Frades in the municipality of Vidigueira, in the southern Alentejo, Portugal. The convent, which dates to the Middle Ages, was dedicated to the martyred saint Cucuphas.

== History ==
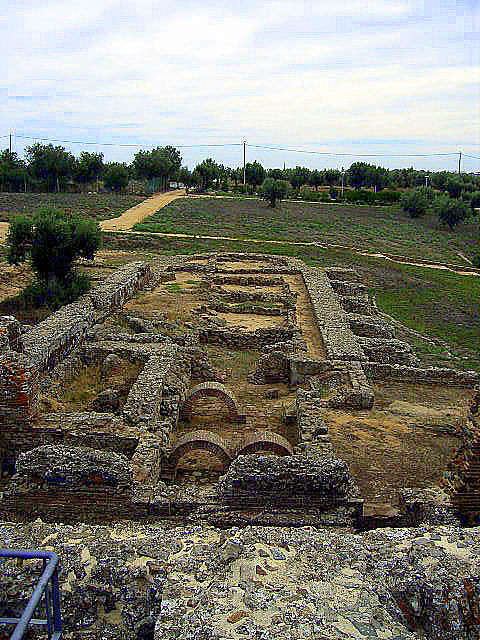
The thermae in the Roman ruins of the villa

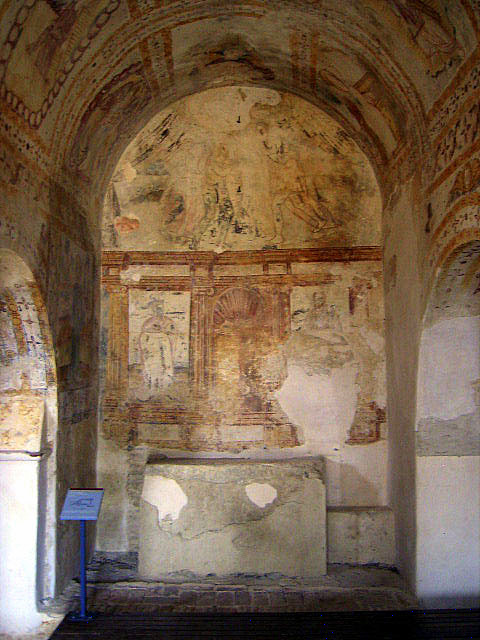
The simple monastic altar in the convent, with painted murals

By the end of the 4th millennium BCE, Neolithic clans had temporarily occupied the areas of southern Alentejo as a base for their activities.

The beginnings of the convent were laid down in the 1st century CE with the construction a small Roman villa. It followed that period's model of architectural design in being built around the baths and peristyle.

Between the 3rd and 4th centuries, construction occurred on what was later considered the second villa complex. The massive complex visible today dates from the mid-4th century. The bath renovations were never completed. The villa was abandoned sometime between the end of the 4th century and the mid-5th century (Marceo, p. 130).

Around the 9th century, the convent was established on the grounds/ruins of the Roman villa. It persisted until the late 12th century. In 1254, the ecclesiastical parish of São Cucufate was installed in the convent under the supervision of the monastery of São Vicente de Fora. The Augustine canons who lived there were later followed by Benedictine monks.

Around the 17th century, the buildings were abandoned by the monastic community, although one hermit monk remained. With a few discontinuities, transformations, and adaptations, the occupation of this space extended until the 18th century, primarily because the contiguous area's rich soil and abundant water were conducive to a small garden and residence. The chapel continued to serve the local community until the 18th century.

=== Republic ===
In 1975, the DGEMN - Direcção Geral dos Edifícios e Monumentos Nacionais (General Directorate of Buildings and National Monuments) was involved in the process to consolidate the sites protection, reinforce the walls and pavements and repair the doors. In the following year, the masonry was repaired and vaulted ceilings, while some doors were reinforced or added.

The first excavations were begun under the orientation of Jorge Alarcão and R. Etienne in 1979, and which were renewed in 1981 and 1985.

Investigations carried out by the IPPAR, at the São Cucufate site marked the beginning of the a new period of occupation. On 1 June 1992, the site was transferred into the supervision and authority of the IPPAR (under legal dispatch 106F/92). Under the IPPAR the site was reorganized, with a formal archaeological excavation established, the landscaping around the periphery and the establishment of tourist-oriented spaces construction of an interpretative centre completed in 2001 (by the architects Franscisco Caldeira Cabral and Nuno Bruno Soares). In order to expand education and preserved the historical continuity of the area, the IPPAR created the Núcleo Museológico in Vila de Frades, in the Casa do Arco and Casa do Almeida, two urban buildings ceded from the municipal council of Vidigueira, to serve as interpretative centres for the archaeological site.

== Architecture ==
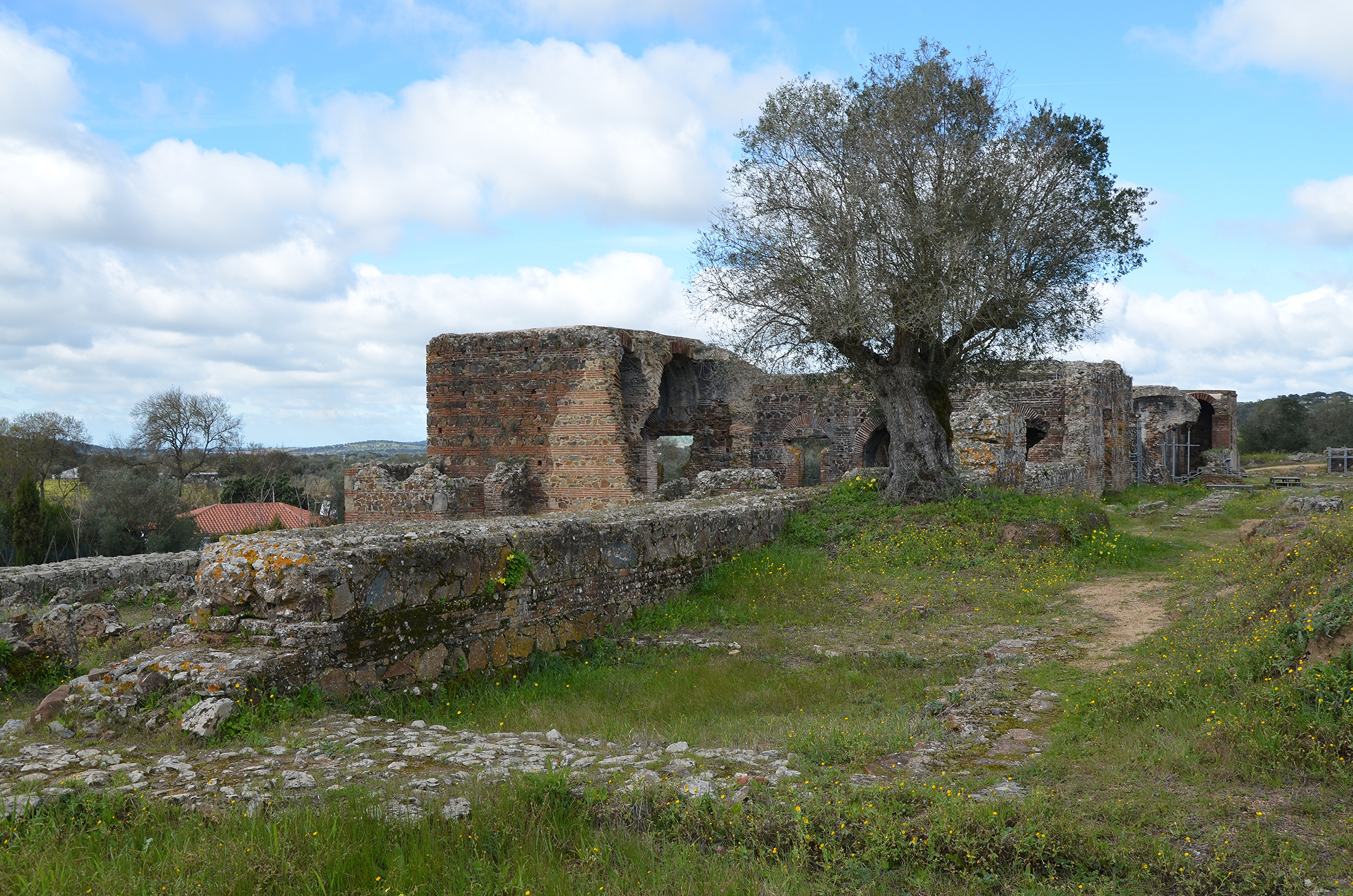
The farmhouse and ruins of the complex

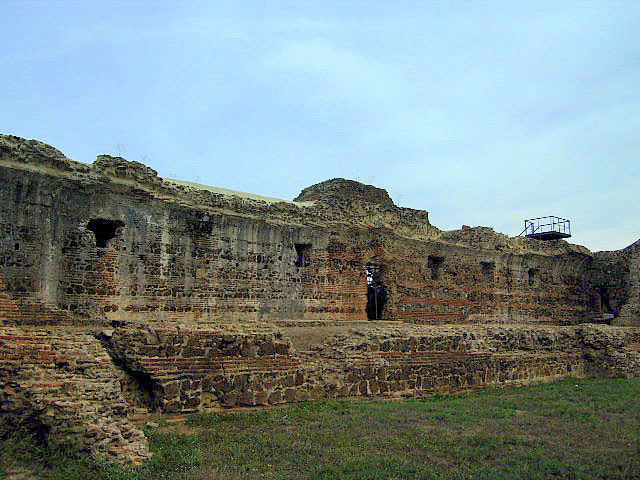
The old terrace and gallery of the Roman villa

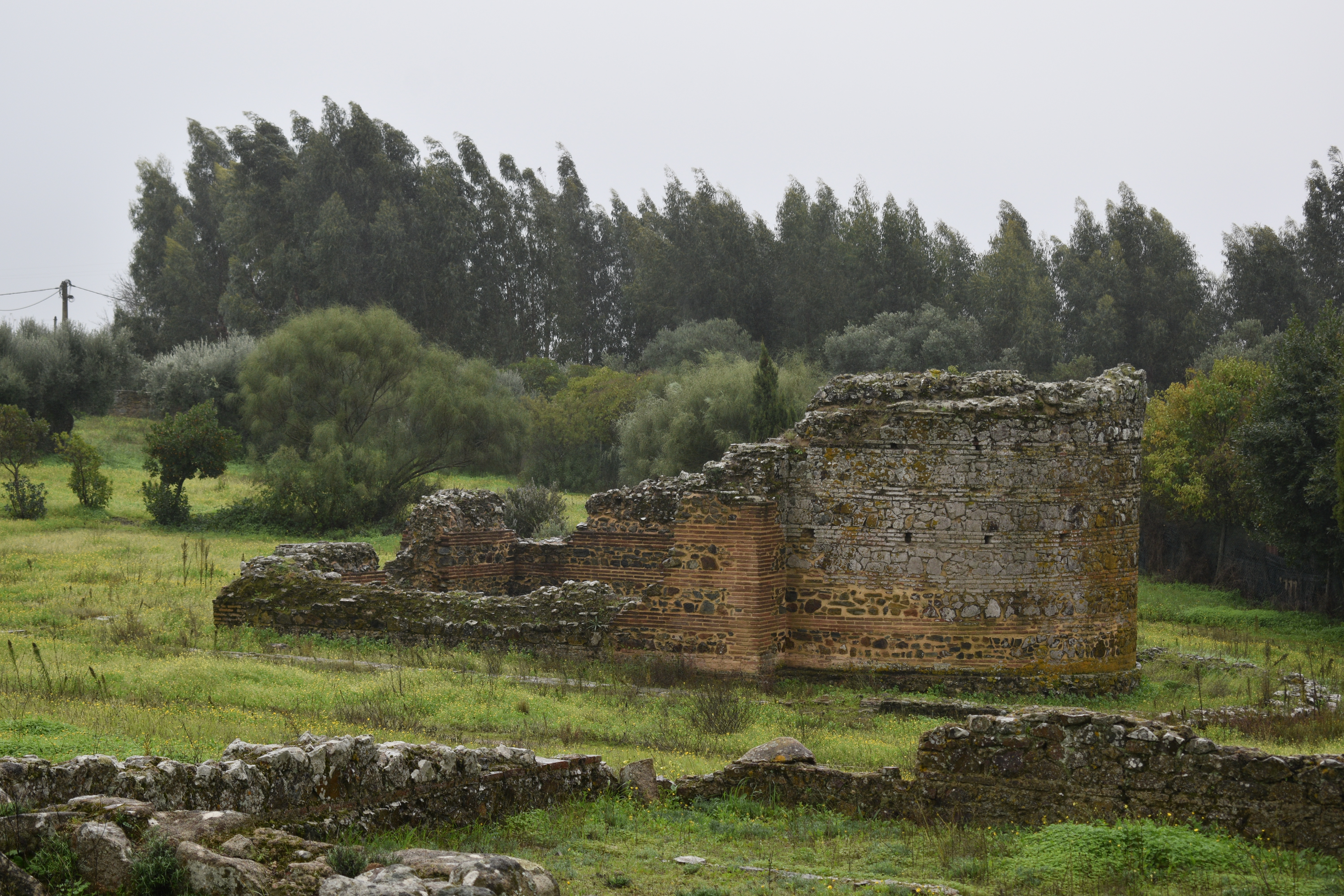
Side view of the temple

São Cucufate is off the IP2 in the direction of Vidigueira, and the EN258 to Vila de Frades, toward Monte de Guadalupe.

Slightly elevated, the 1st-century rural village dominated the space, with a southern view of the landscape, until Beja. It was likely the centre of a small community, with the property owner's residence, spaces for agricultural storage, warehousing, and equipment to produce wine and olive oil. During this period and until the late 4th century, the main house was expanded in two major projects. The first, starting in the 2nd century, was initially a minor expansion of the residence (pars urbana). The second, in the middle of the 4th century, marked a complete schism with the older architectural style, with a principal façade oriented around several interior courtyards open to the exterior along a linear line. These modifications remain at the archaeological site. They reflect their epoch's grandiose style and opulence.

This late Roman villa exceeds all the typical dimensions of the Roman villae in Portugal (even as its true extent is undetermined). There are still indications that the remainder of the rustic structures have not been completely unearthed, and which extend south from the main group. Unlike other Roman civil architecture in Portugal, which is oriented primarily around peristyle design, this "villa" was developed vertically, with a main floor and vaulted galleries supported by the main facades framed/flanked by protruding bodies. The closest parallels are the Roman villas of Milreu, Pisões and Rabaçal.

The Roman-era villa is a plan composed of a central rectangular body encircled by two almost-symmetrical, lateral rectangular buildings. The exception is a semi-circular apse that completes the northern body's eastern wing. A few spaces only continue to show their walls, while a few still have their vaulted ceiling and terraces.

The principal façade, oriented to the northwest, corresponds to the central body, where one can seem a long gallery preceded by a landing, which connects to remnants of a garden, by three steps. To the rear, is a gallery that remains partially covered in a vaulted ceiling, with arcades for a grand tank, 35 by 10 metres.

In the northern lateral body, are the remains of the rectangular chapel, with semi-circular apse, covered in wicker doors, broken by an arched lintel, with straight and rectangular openings. The interior comprises two naves, separated by 3 arches over pillars, and covered by three transverse vaults. The juxtaposed apse is covered by a vaulted ceiling with a central shell motif at its apex.

Since there is no heating system within the Roman villa, it has been suggested that the villa was only used during the harvest season.

In the southern part of the villa, are the remains of a Roman temple (connected by a wall) and constituted of a rectangular cell-apse with two niches in the internal walls.

Archaeological artifacts found in the excavations have included ceramics, glass, and metal implements, as well as copper and silver coins. These discoveries have been outshined by the excavation of a bronze statue, representing an emperor in a toga, crowned with laurel, in addition to a small altar and marble tomb.

== See also ==
- Roman ruins of Pisões
