= Meydan Castle =

Archaeological site in Mersin, Turkey

Meydankale
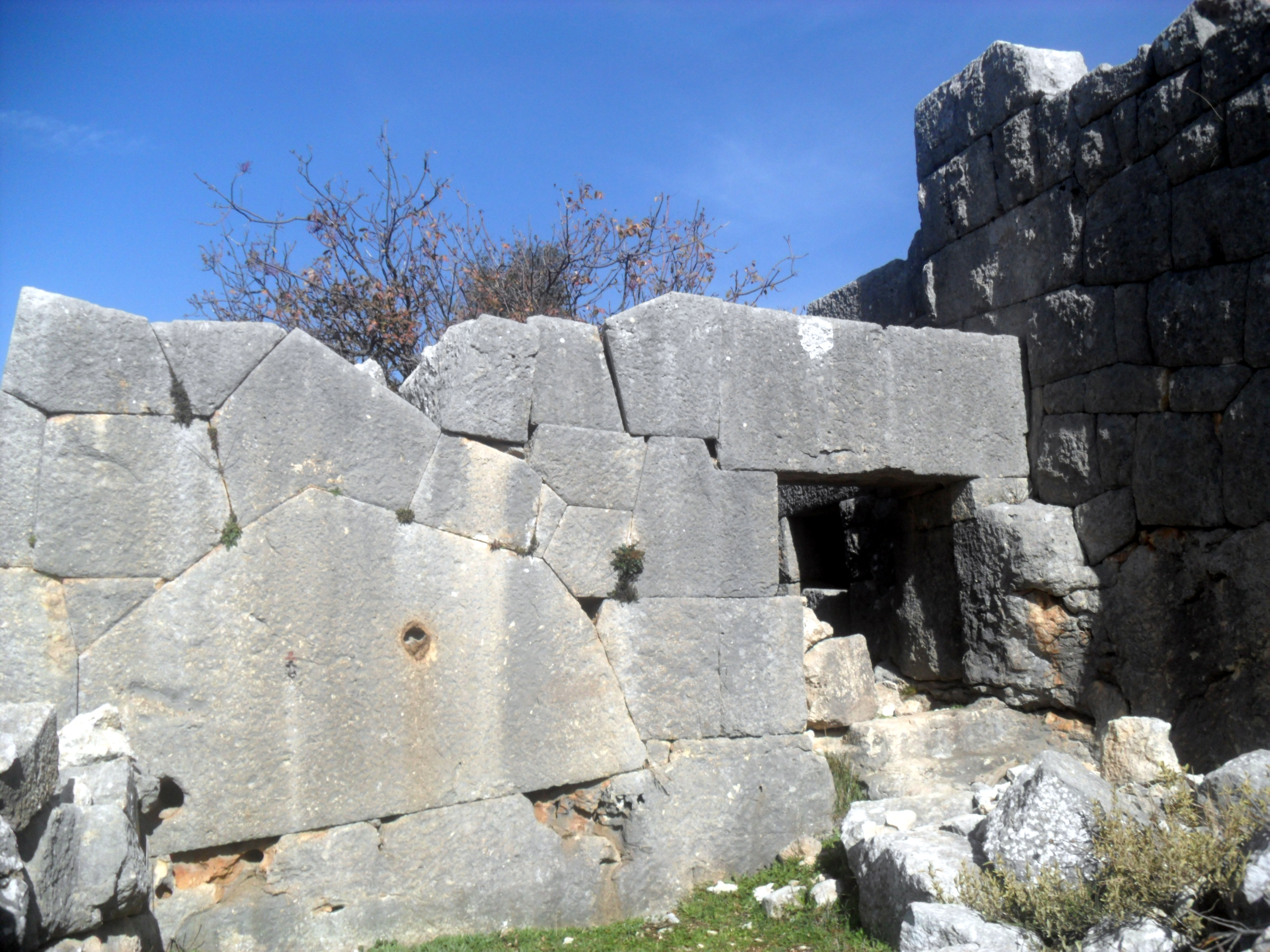
- Meydankale masonry of two different eras

- Location within Turkey
- 36°29′45″N 33°58′31″E
- Type: Fort
- Periods: Hellenistic Age to Byzantine Empire
- Location: Silifke, Mersin Province, Turkey
- Region: Mediterranean Region

Meydankale is the archaeological site of a ruined castle in Mersin Province, Turkey.

== Geography ==
Meydankale is situated between the İmamlı and Yenibahçe villages in the rural area of Silifke district. In the antiquity this region was called Cilicia Trachaea (Rugged Cilicia). Meydankale is to the north of Silifke and the Turkish state highway D.400. It can be reached via a 15 kilometres (9.3 mi) road from Atakent which is on D-400. The distance from Meydankale to Silifke is 28 kilometres (17 mi) and to Mersin is 85 kilometres (53 mi) .

== History ==
The settlement dates back to Hellenistic era (Seleucid Empire). But it was rebuilt and inhabited during the later eras. Neither Hellenistic nor the Roman name of the settlement is known. Meydankale is a Turkish name.

== Ruins ==
Meydankale is a fort situated on a hill which oversees the mid portion of the road from the Mediterranean Sea coast to the ancient city of Uzuncaburç, (ancient Diokaesareia). A deep canyon is to the north of the fort. There are ruins of observation towers, bastions, cisterns a necropolis in the fort. There is also a staircase to the river at the east of the fort. The main building material is polygonal stones typical of Seleucid masonry. Bossage had been used in later architecture.
