= İmamlı, Silifke =

İmamlı
- Neighbourhood
- Location in Turkey
- Coordinates: 36°29′N 33°58′E
- Country: Turkey
- Province: Mersin
- District: Silifke
- Elevation: 745 m (2,444 ft)
- Population (2022): 622
- Time zone: UTC+3 (TRT)
- Postal code: 33940
- Area code: 0324

İmamlı is a neighbourhood in the municipality and district of Silifke, Mersin Province, Turkey. Its population is 622 (2022). It is a situated in the southern slopes of Toros Mountains. The distance to Silifke is about 13 kilometres (8.1 mi) and to Mersin is 98 kilometres (61 mi). The population is composed of Yürüks, a branch of Turkmens. Main economic activities are agriculture and animal breeding. The village people were also allowed by the forestry authorities in Mersin to pick bay laurel in the forests

== See also ==
- Meydankale
- Gökkale
