= Villa rustica (Möckenlohe) =

Coordinates: 48.824391°N 11.235784°E

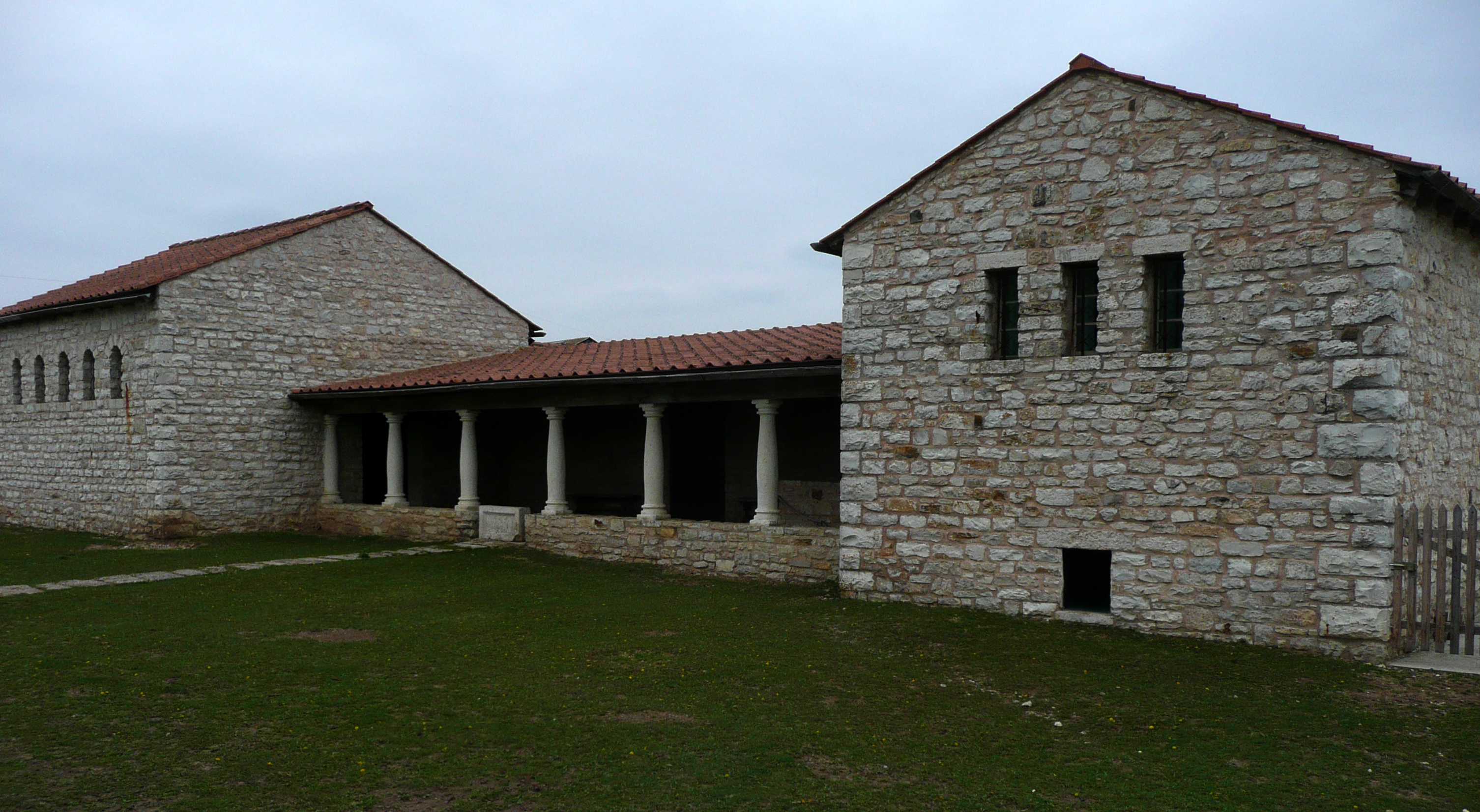
View from the south

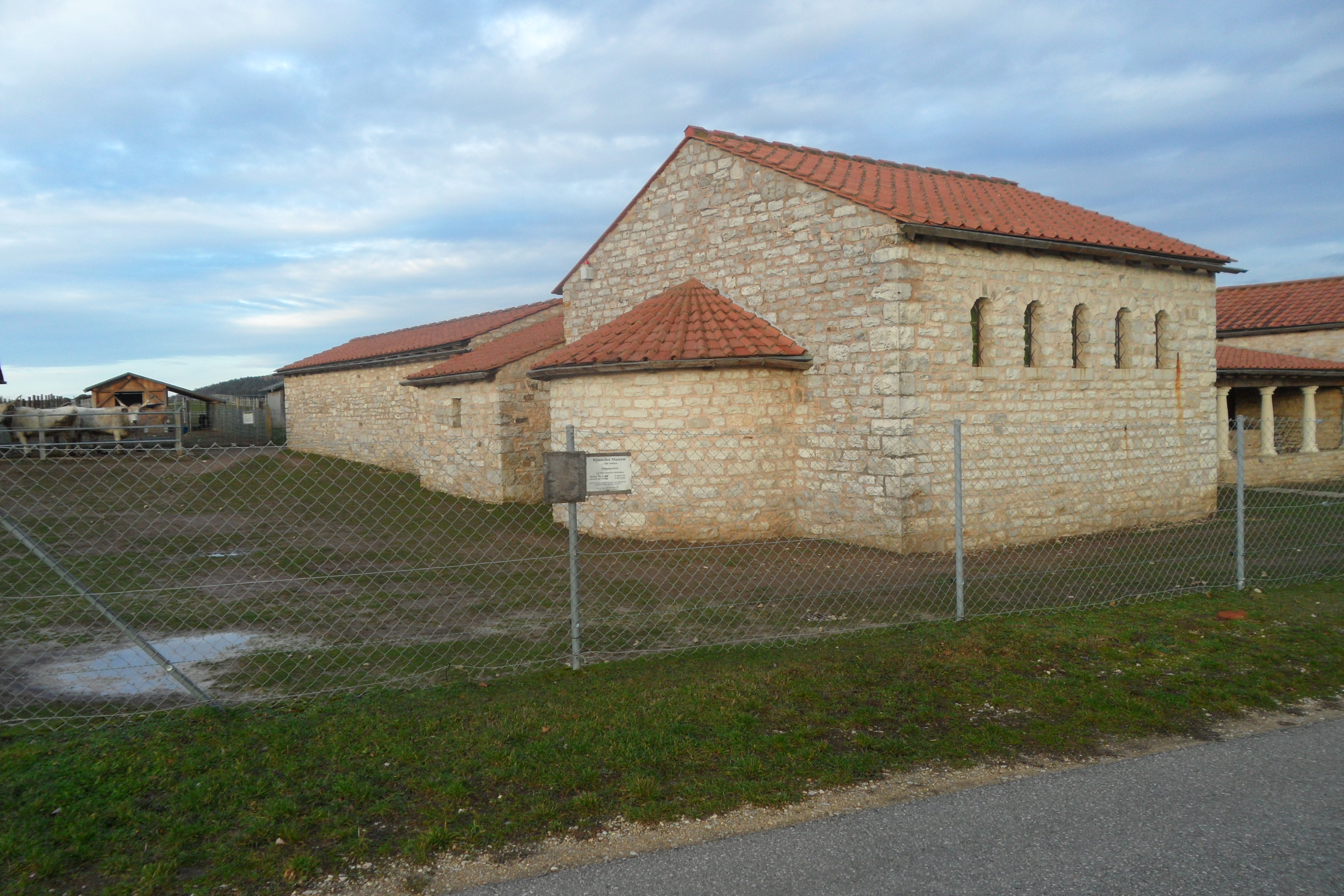
View from the southwest

The Villa rustica in Möckenlohe is the remains of a villa rustica from the 2nd or 3rd century near Möckenlohe, a part of the municipality of Adelschlag in the Landkreis Eichstätt in Bavaria.

Ancient remains were known here from the beginning of the 20th century. Aerial photos from 1983 show the plan of the villa, but also outbuildings. The main house was excavated from 1987 to 1989 and rebuilt in 1992/93.

The construction of the villa consisted of limestone masonry, which had an avant-corps on the front in the south, where the main entrance was. There was once also a colonnade here. The entire front was once around 30.5 meters long. A large courtyard opened behind the portico. Rooms were located to the west of the courtyard and to the south, where the portico also stood. One room had a basement, and at least two rooms had hypocaust underfloor heating. The villa was probably built under Emperor Hadrian and was abandoned after a fire in the middle of the third century. The modern replica does not correspond in every detail to the archaeological findings and is connected to a petting zoo.

== See also ==
- Villa rustica
