= Villa of Torre de Palma =

Coordinates: 39.0622°N 7.4885°W

The Villa Lusitano-Romana de Torre de Palma, sometimes Villa Cardillio or Vila Cardílio (not to be confused with the Villa Cardillio on Torres Novas) is a Roman villa near Monforte in Portugal, which was in Roman times part of the province of Lusitania. It is considered one of the largest in the Iberian Peninsula. The prosperity of these latifundia in the region is often evidenced by shrines in the courtyard (such as in the Roman Villa of Milreu). In addition to the extensive living areas, a basilica and a seven-roomed baptistery have been uncovered in Torre de Palma.

== Location ==
The villa of Torre de Palma is located about 5 km northwest of Monforte on the main road to Vaiamonte . From the estate Herdade da Palma a signposted, unpaved road leads to the fenced area.

== Excavations ==
The remains of the villa were discovered in 1947 and until 1956, excavations were conducted under the direction of the Portuguese archaeologist Manuel Heleno. Among other things, several well-preserved geometric mosaics were found in the portico and the so-called star mosaic, as well as numerous murals. The Archaeological Museum of Monforte displays some of the originals and reproductions of the mosaics. The best preserved mosaics are in the Museu Nacional de Arqueologia in Lisbon.

== The site ==
The chronology of the various periods of the villa ranges from the 1st to the 5th century. From the 3rd century onward, there was an increase in extent especially in the 4th century. In addition to a large residential complex, a thermal complex was discovered to the east, and a building north of the main building may also have been used for residential purposes. An Early Christian construction of a palace basilica and a baptistery in the northern part of the estate, where there were also two associated burial grounds.

== Villa rustica ==
A villa rustica consisted of a pars urbana, a pars rustica and the frumentaria. The pars urbana was where the owner and his family lived. This would be similar to the wealthy-person's in the city and had painted walls. The pars rustica was where the chef and slaves of the villa worked and lived. This was also the living quarters for the farm's animals. There would usually be other rooms here that might be used as store rooms, a hospital and even a prison. The villa fructuaria would be the storage rooms. These would be where the products of the farm were stored ready for transport to buyers. Storage rooms here would have been used for oil, wine, grain, grapes and any other produce of the villa. Other rooms in the villa might include an office, a temple for worship, several bedrooms, a dining room and a kitchen.

The main building of the villa rustica at Torre de Palma alone took up 10,000 m^{2} of space. It was created around a quadrangular peristyle. In the centre was an Impluvium with an adjoining column-supported porch and mosaic floors. Adjoining the courtyard are the tablinum and the exedra, which used to be a kind of music and social space in the past. Here the famous mosaics with representations of muses and horses were found. The dining room, the triclinium, is decorated with frescoes on the walls and a mosaic of floral motifs on the floor. The North side of the atrium was a hortus. On the West side of the atrium were the private rooms and a small thermal baths more private than the main spa.

== Basilica ==
Right next to the entrance of the site are the ruins of the early Christian basilica with a cross-shaped baptistery. The building type with opposite apses is documented in Hispania five times between the 6th and the 7th century. The discovery of nine coins at the eastern end of the nave suggests a much earlier date for the Basilica of Torre de Palma, as the embossed dates are between 335 and 357. Strong remains of foundations under the basilica suggest that another sanctuary was there before believed to have been a Temple to Mars.

== Baptistery ==
The initially 26 m long pillared basilica later received an extension on its south side, which contained a seven-roomed baptistery. The associated piscina considered to be the most complex in the Iberian Peninsula. It is clad with marble. The structure in the western part of the villa became cluttered due to a small church built after the Reconquista. The baptismal room now has a modern shelter.

== Artefacts ==
The site has yielded numerous artifacts among them, coins dated 145 A.D. and 408 A.D. fibulae, fragments of iron, like blades and artifacts of bronze such as Situla, a bird and a bell. Numerous fragments of sigillata, earth and other ceramic fragments were also identified. Other finds include glass from Egyptus and Syria Palaestina as well as some Byzantine jewellery and a statue of Cupid.

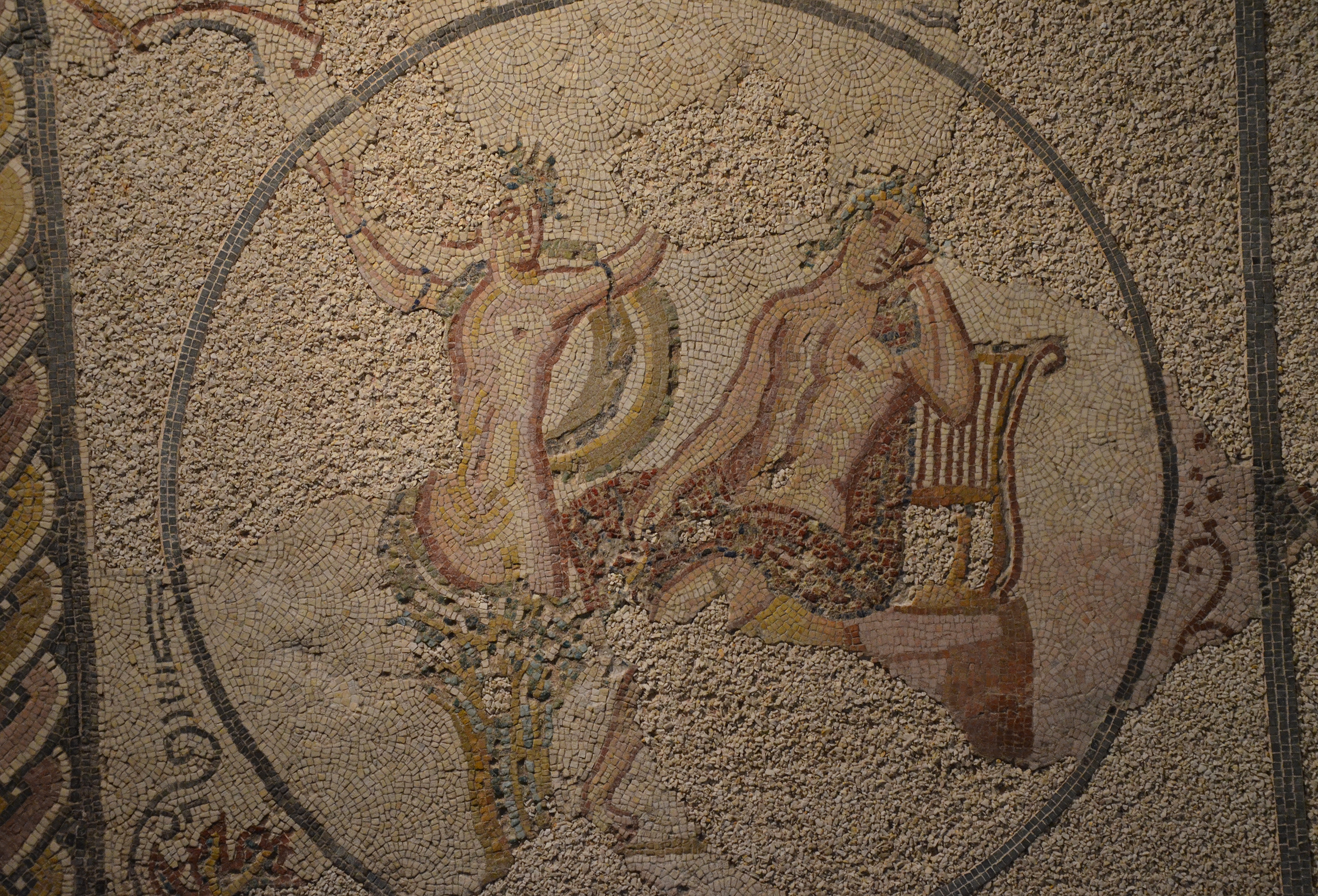
Mosaic panel depicting Apollo and Daphne

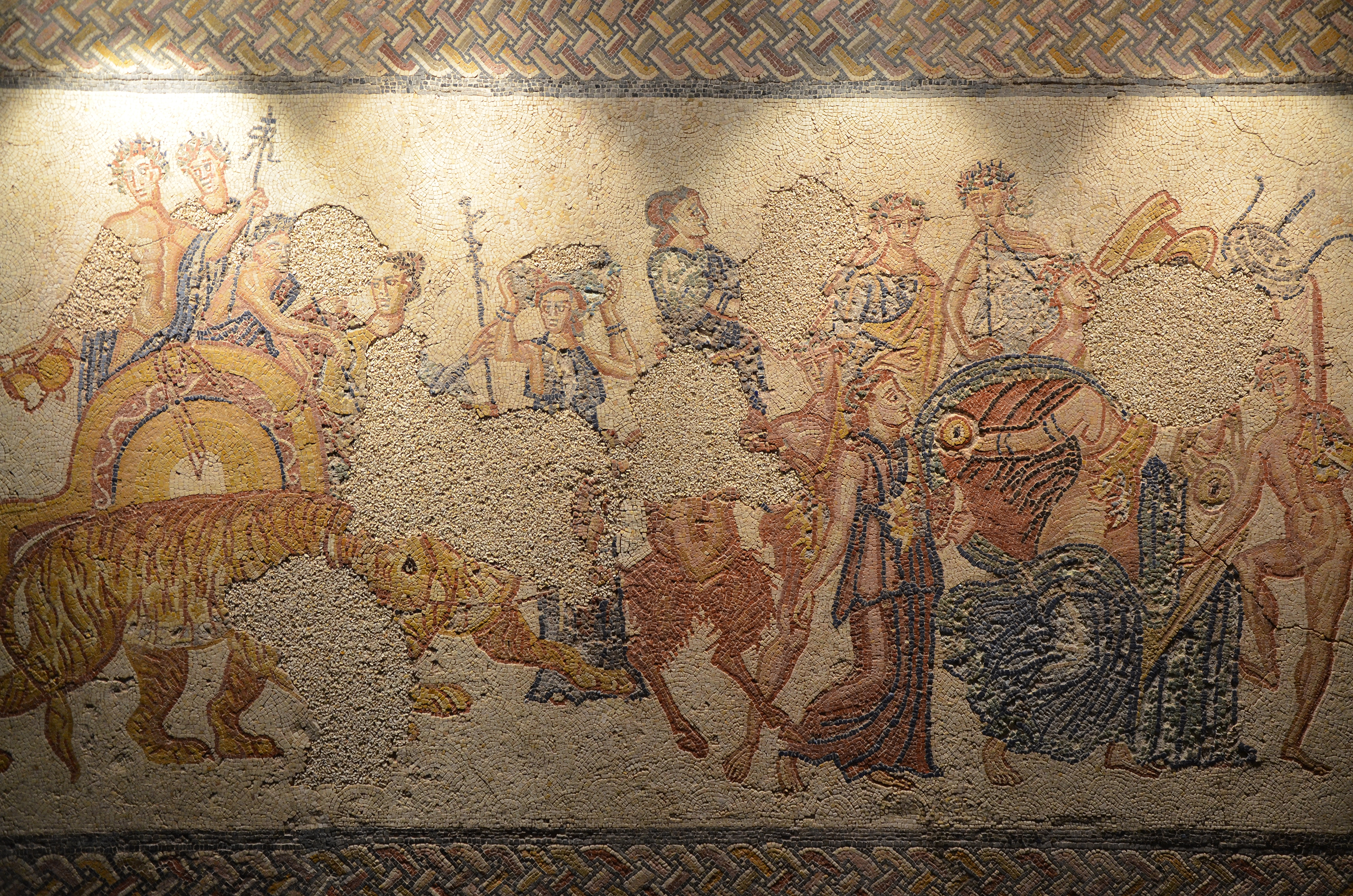
Mosaic panel depicting the Triumph of Bacchus

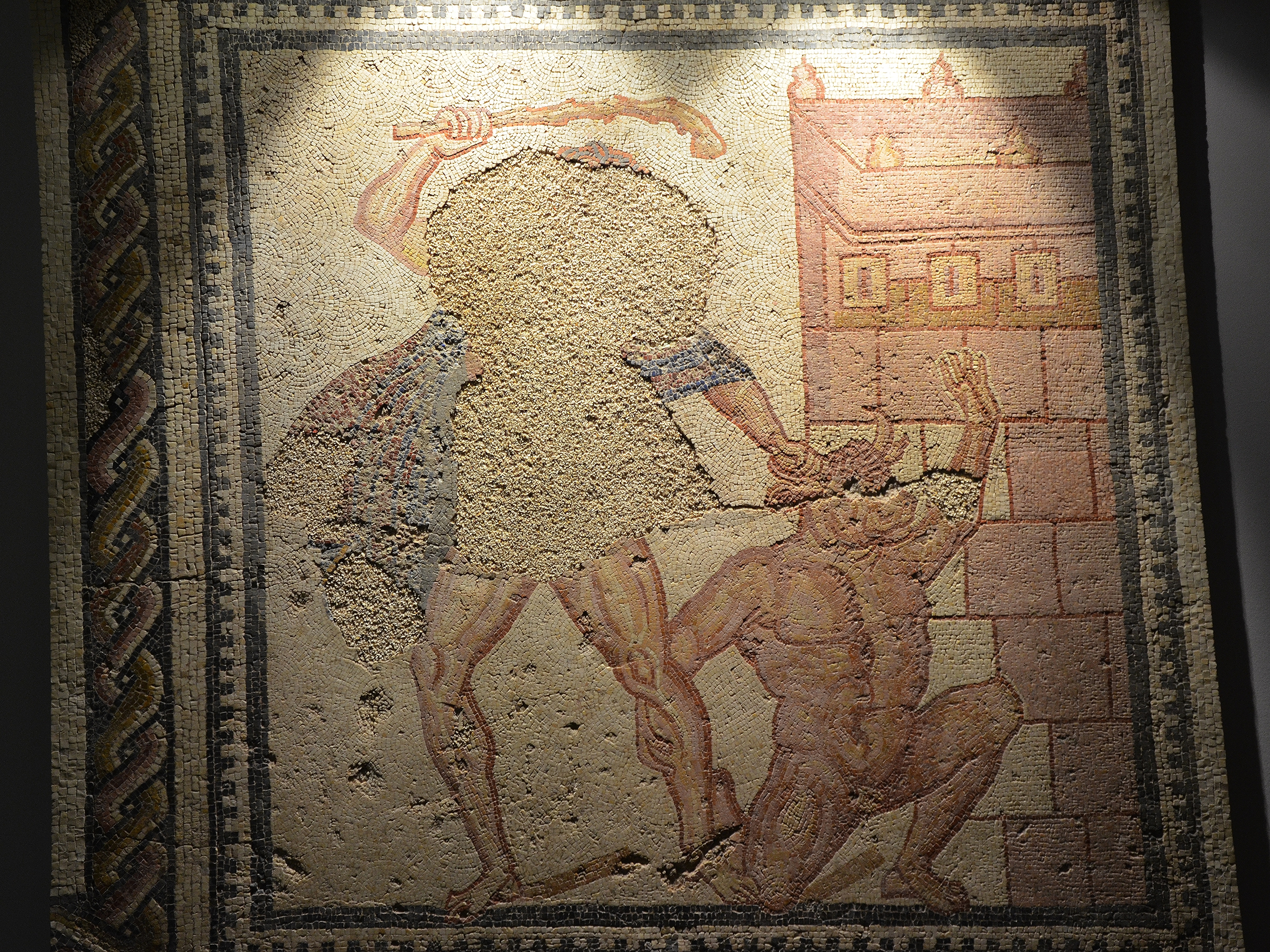
Mosaic panel depicting Theseus and the Minotaur

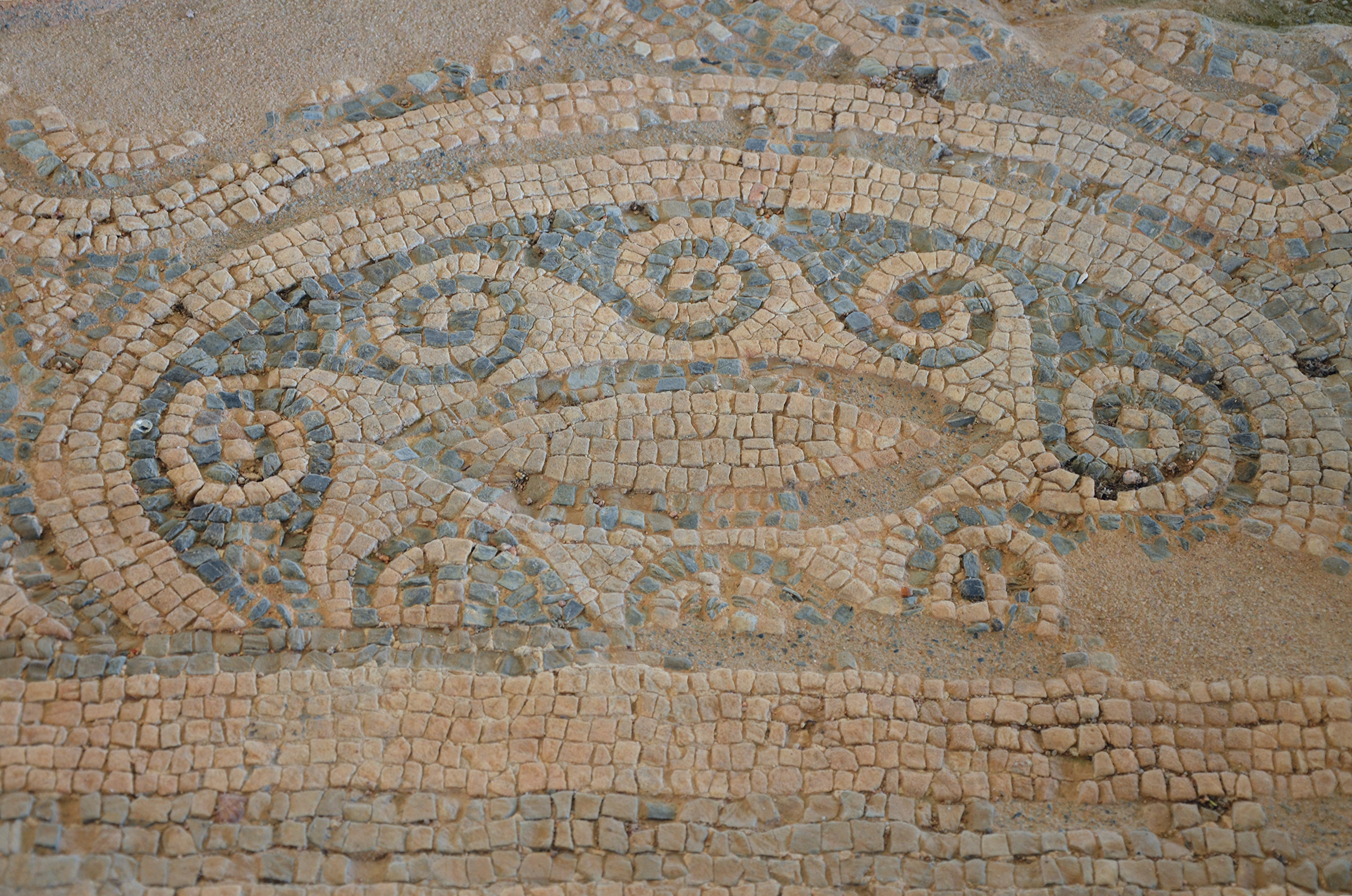
Detail mosaic floor

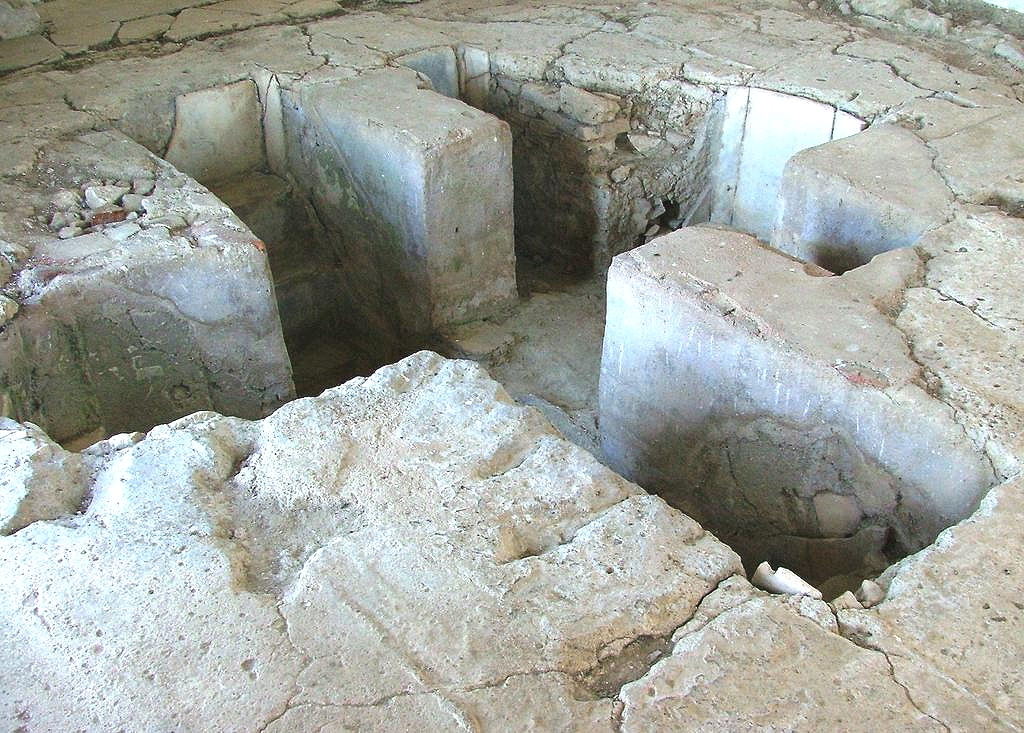
Piscina

== Literature ==
- Manuel Heleno: A villa lusitano-romana de Torre de Palma (Monforte). In: O Arqueólogo Português. NS, 4, 1962, S. 313–338.
- Jean Gérard Gorges, Manuel Salinas de Frías: Les campagnes de Lusitanie romaine: occupation du sol et habitats. Casa de Velázquez, Madrid 1994, ISBN 84-86839-76-9.
- Walter Trillmich, Annette Nünnerich-Asmus (Hrsg.): Hispania Antiqua. Denkmäler der Römerzeit. von Zabern, Mainz 1993, ISBN 3-8053-1547-3, S. 212, S. 395 (Votivaltar für Mars) und S. 409 (Musenmosaik).
- Thomas G. Schattner (Hrsg.): Archäologischer Wegweiser durch Portugal. ( Kulturgeschichte der Antiken Welt. Band 74). von Zabern, Mainz 1998, ISBN 3-8053-2313-1, S. 126–128.
- Janine Lancha, P. André: La villa de Torre de Palma. (Corpus des mosaïques romaines du Portugal 2, 1). Lissabon 2000, ISBN 972-776-081-3.
