= Gökkale =

Ruins of a Roman villa in Turkey

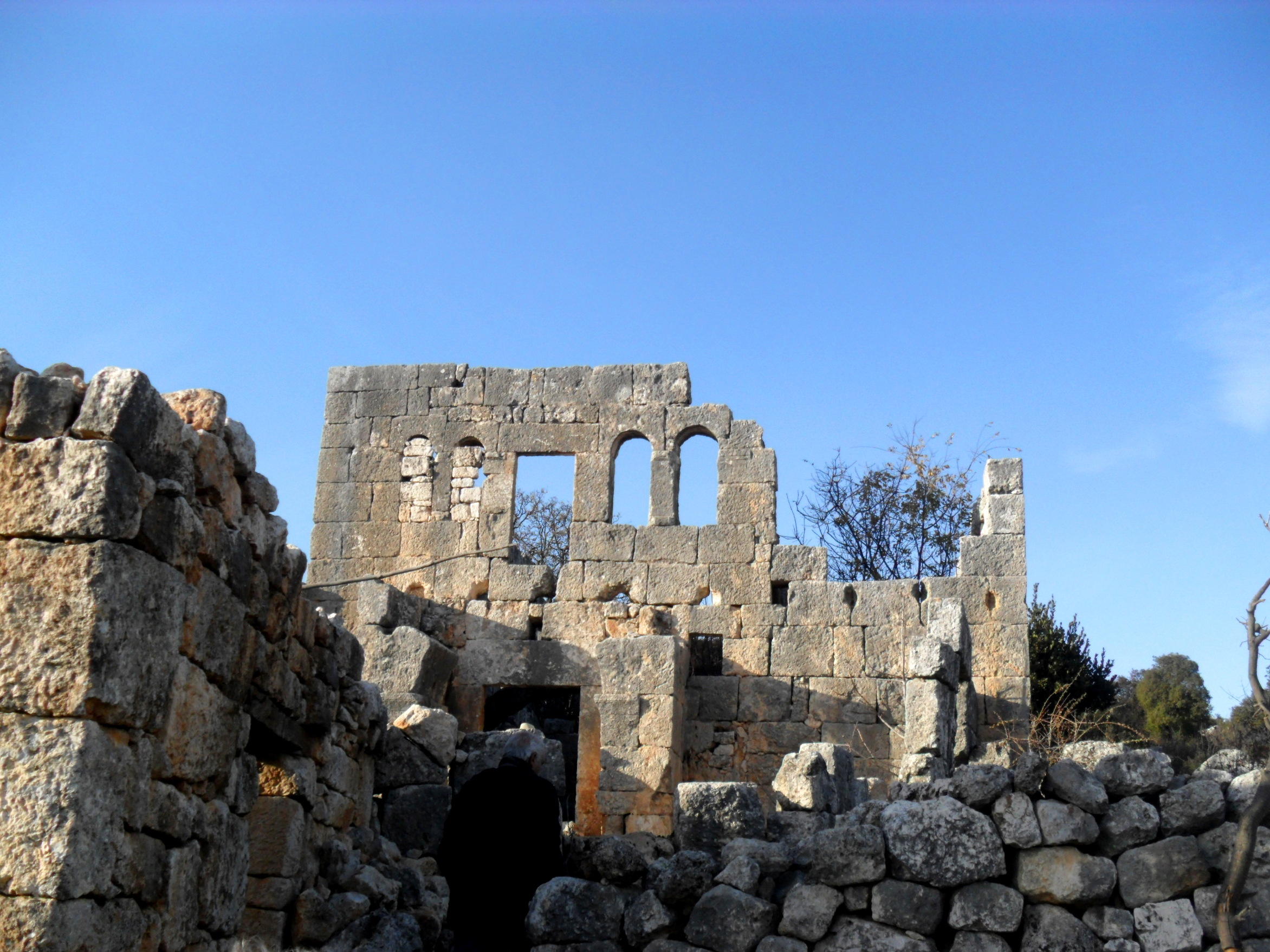
- Villa rustica from the south

- Location within Turkey
- 36°30′02″N 33°57′13″E
- Type: Villa rustica
- Periods: Roman Empire to early Byzantine Empire
- Location: Silifke, Mersin Province, Turkey
- Region: Mediterranean Region

Site notes
- Owner: Partially demolished

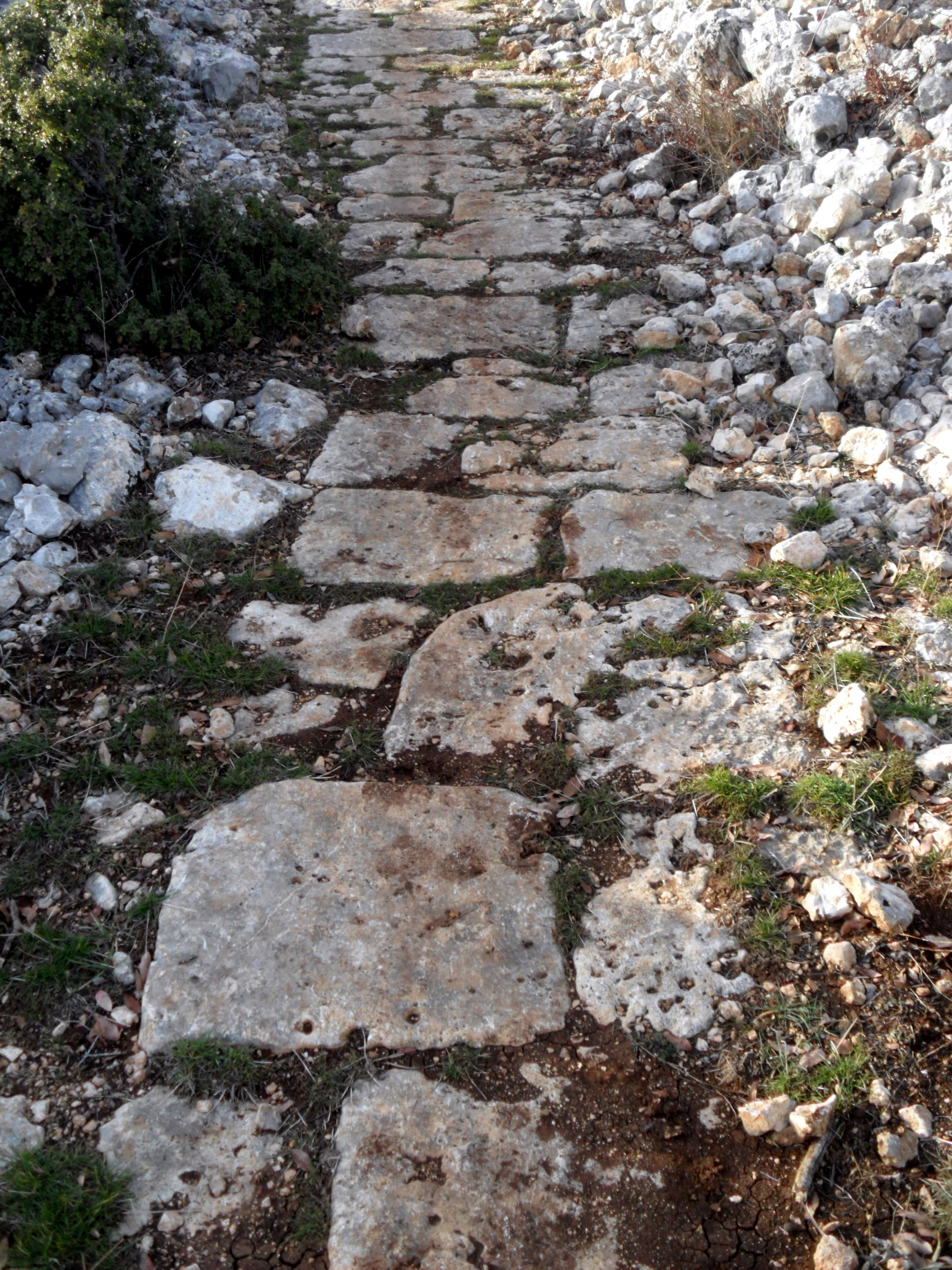
Roman road to the villa rustica

Gökkale is an ancient villa rustica in Silifke district of Mersin Province, Turkey

== Geography ==
Gökkale is situated to the northwest of the İmamlı village. Imamlı can be reached via a 15 km (9.3 mi) road from Atakent which is on Turkish state highway D.400. The 2 kilometres (1.2 mi) - road from İmamlı to Gökkale is not accessible by motor vehicles. But there is a footpath which at times coincides with a Roman road. The distance to Silifke is 30 kilometres (19 mi) and to Mersin is 87 kilometres (54 mi).

== History ==
Gökkale literally means "Skycastle". But actually it was a residence. Gökkale is situated in a region which was once called Cilicia Trachaea (Rugged Cilicia). This region was famous for olive production and there were vast farms during the Roman Empire and early Byzantine Empire eras. Villa rusticas were residences of wealthy farm owners.

== Building ==
The building with orthogonal masonry has six rooms. The windows are supported by vaults. There is a big cistern under the front yard of the building. There are two sarcophagi, the ruins of an olive press and a mill around the building.

== Trivia ==
In 1949 the building was temporarily used as a village school.
