= Roman ruins of Pisões =

Roman Ruins of Pisões
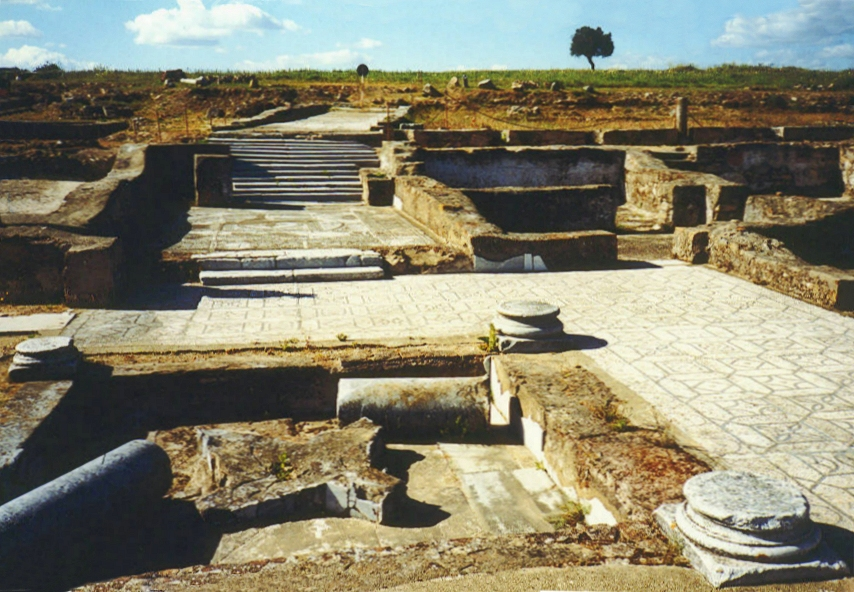
- Interactive map of Roman Ruins of Pisões
- 37°59′51.4″N 7°56′57.7″W
- Type: Ruins
- Location: Beja, Baixo Alentejo, Alentejo, Portugal

Site notes
- Archaeologists: Ditza Reis
- Owner: Portuguese Republic
- Public access: Public Herdade de Algramaça, on the limit of the civil parish approximately 3 kilometres (1.9 mi) west of the village of Penedo Gordo, on dirt road (signalled) along the barranco of Pisões

The Roman Ruins of Pisões (Portuguese: Ruinas Romanas de Pisões), is an important Roman villa rustica located in the civil parish of Beja (Santiago Maior e São João Baptista) in the municipality of Beja, in the Portuguese Alentejo, classified as a Imóvel de Interesse Público (Property of Public Interest).

== History ==
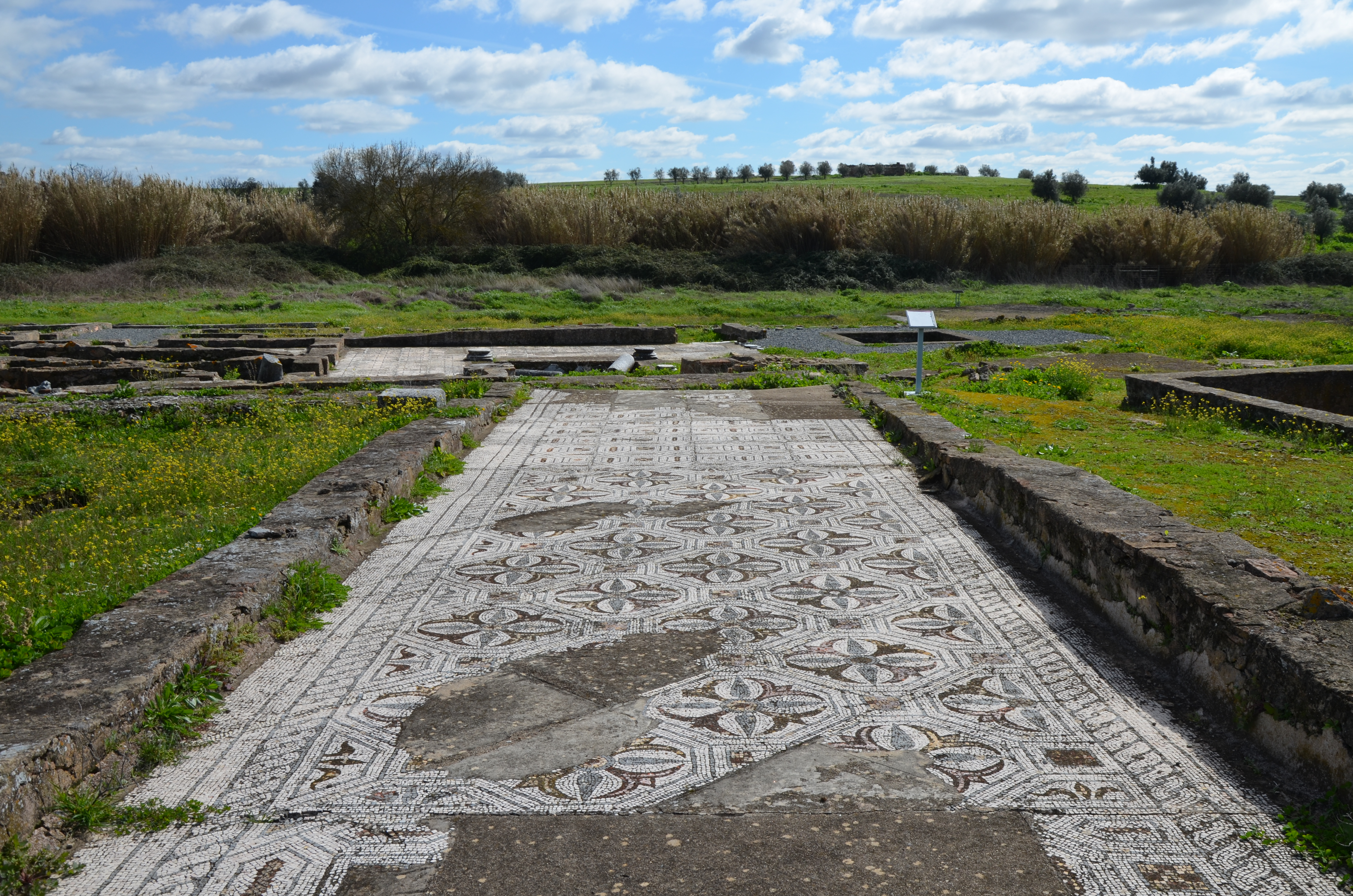
The ornate mosaics leading to the main "house" on the site

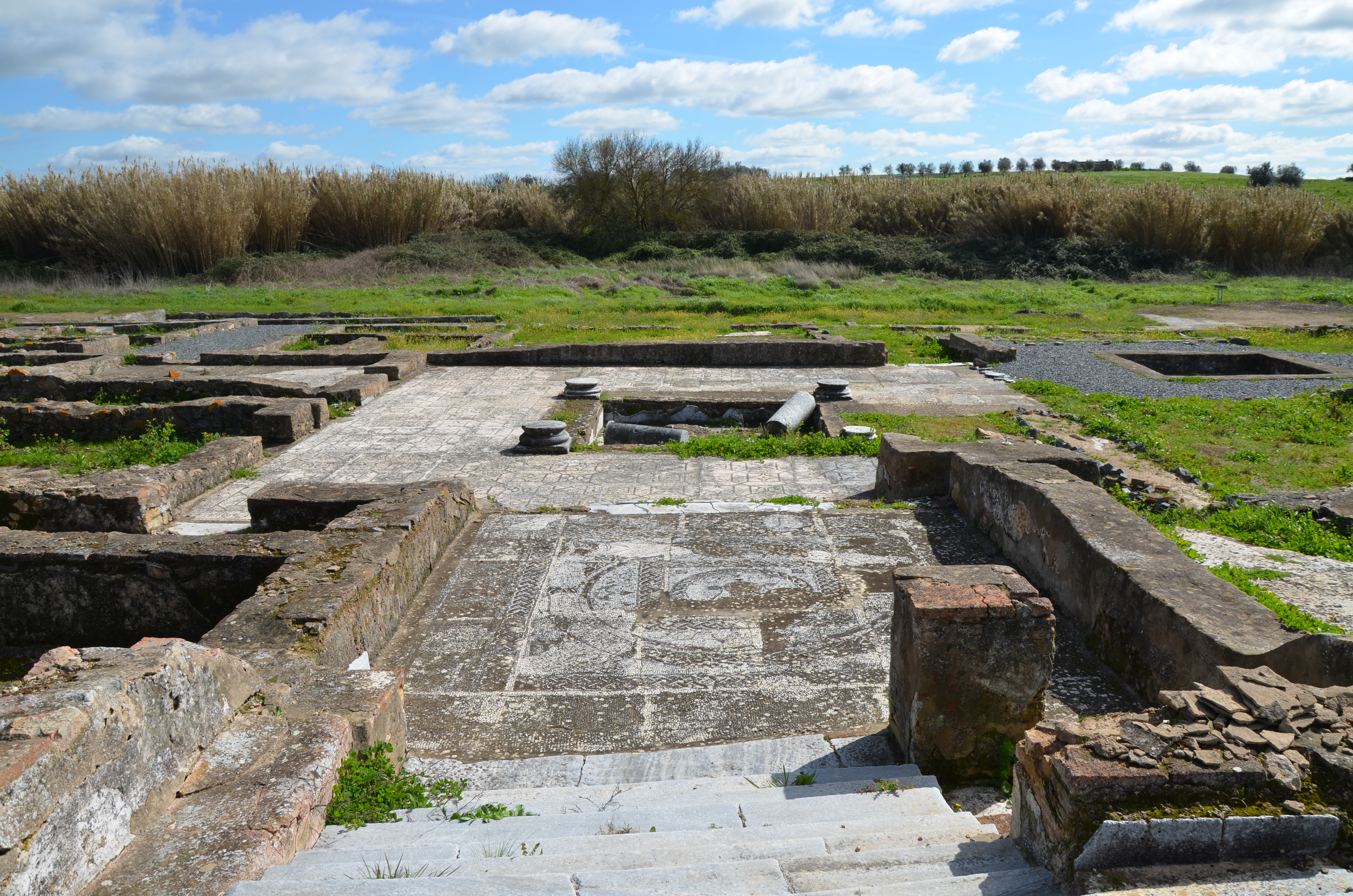
The central patio of the main residence with base capitals

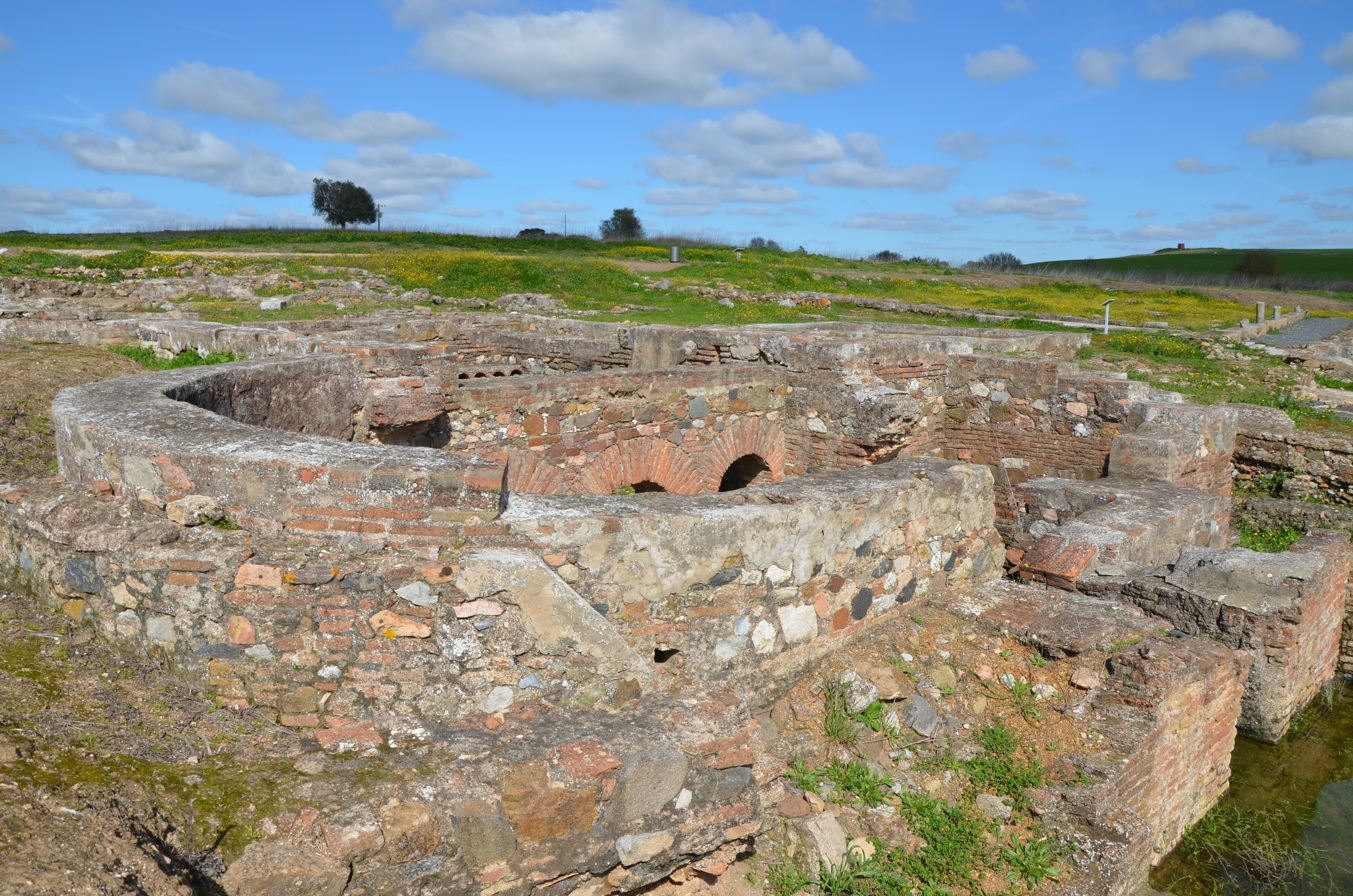
A part of the complex thermae at the site

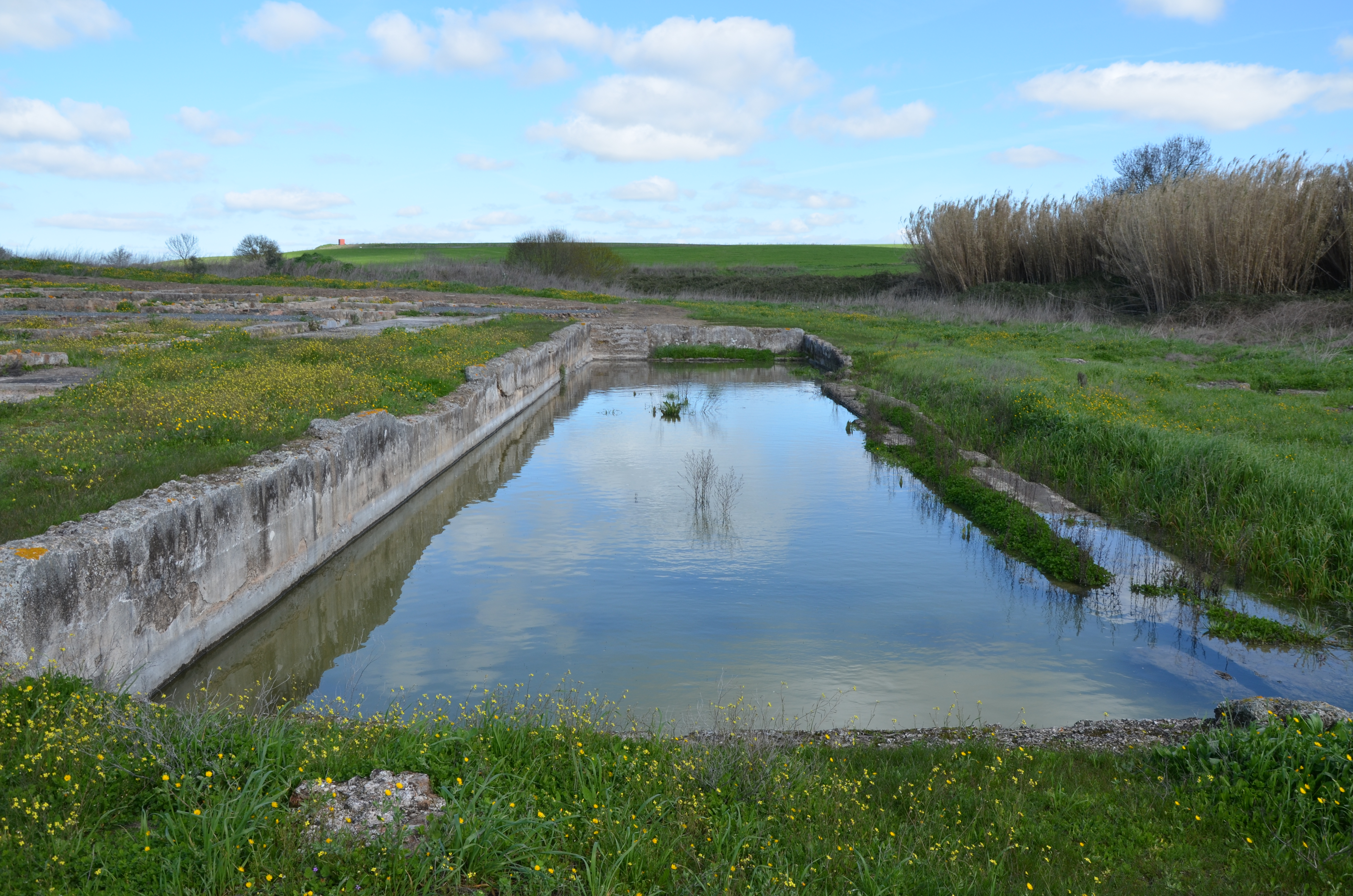
The pool submerged with rainwater on the site at Pisões

The urban villa dates back to the 1st century, and continued occupied until the 4th century, owing to the artefacts discovered on site that included ceramics, terra sigilata, friezes, glass, bronze and coins. The area, due to its fertile and abundant biodiversity made the location a viable site to develop a farm, support livestock and mine, products that support many of the local markets. Its occupation was discontinuance; apart from the Roman period, the discovery of two Visigothic capitals and the existence of black ceramics, indicate a period of cross-pollination at the site.

A small altar, to the invocation of the goddess Hygieia, suggest the name of the family that occupied the residence, the Gaio Atílio Gordo clan. The building belonged to an agricultural enterprise, that supplied the Roman city of Pax Julia (today Beja) from the 1st to the 4th centuries with foodstuffs. Gaius Atilius Cordo, whose name was found on an altar stone, was one of its owners.

The rustic villa was accidentally re-discovered in 1967, during the course of agricultural work, resulting in immediate archaeological investigations in the area.

== Architecture ==
The site is situated on the flanks of a small hill, and the villa implanted on a small incline along a watercourse in the Herdade de Almagrassa, not far from a Roman dam, and approximately 10 kilometres (6.2 mi) southwest of Beja.

Clearly visible is the pars urbana, the living area of the owners. Mosaics with geometrical and naturalistic motives are to be found in the more important of the over 40 rooms of the pars urbana. There is also a well-preserved hypocaustum (an underground structure for heating) of the spa. The apodyterium, caldarium, tepidarium and frigidarium have been identified. Also in the pars rustica, where labourers, animals and farm tools were located and the pars fructuaria (including the granary, the winery and stables), recognizable details are visible.

The villa is oriented to the south, with vestages of the site divided among several rectangular spaces of varying dimensions. In addition to the pars urbana, there was a pars rustica and pars fructuaria, that included many of the structures, service areas, warehouses, presses, barns and areas to transform agricultural and fruitstuffs.

In reality, the thermae constitutes one of the more relevant examples of private Roman baths complexes in the Portuguese territory, and was constructed in two phases after the construction of the residential homes. They included the apodyterium (where people would practice exercises), the laconicum (or sauna), the strigilus (where residents would scrub dirt and oils from their bodies), the caldarium (where they would bath in a warm pool) and, finally, the tepidarium or frigidarium (where they would repose). These spaces surround a central atrium (or peristylus) marked by columns framing a central pool (impluvium), with access to the north by a staircase. Along the southern flank is a large patio. To the west of the peristylus is a hall of larger dimensions decorated by a semicircular wall with a small lake in the centre. To the west of the residential group are bathing rooms that included praefurnium and three halls, with a central rectangular space. The extremes are terminated by semi-circular caldarium over arches supporting columns, round the rectangular tank with a five degree incline access. To the north, are 10 columns divided at a distance of 2.3 metres (7.5 ft). To the south of the villa, and parallel to the river is a large 40 by 8.3 metres (131 ft × 27 ft) pool with a six-step access. Many of the pavements in the halls are covered in black and white mosaics, with the oldest being polychromatic with geometric or animal designs. In a few of the chambers there are slabs of marble for flooring and part of the walls, with remnants of stucco on these latter walls.

=== Dam ===
The villa is highlighted by its connection to a developed water collection and storage system. The Roman dam is located just north of the villa and includes an unreinforced 58 by 4.3 metres (190 ft × 14 ft) gravity dam reinforced by a 3 metres (9.8 ft) thick wall. The masonry and wedge bricks are specially constructed to support the structure, with gaps sealed with small stones. The dam closes a hydrological basin that extends to Beja, covering an area of 18.6 square kilometres (7.2 mi^{2}). It is assumed that the reservoir created from this dam occupied a length of 340 metres (1,120 ft) and area of 31,300 square metres (337,000 ft^{2}), holding a volume 38,000 cubic metres (1,300,000 ft^{3}). The dam helped to supply water for agriculture and recreational purposes (including the swimming pool and thermae) in the villa.
