= List of municipalities in Karaman Province =

This is the List of municipalities in Karaman Province, Turkey as of March 2023.

| District | Municipality |
|---|---|
| Ayrancı | Ayrancı |
| Başyayla | Başyayla |
| Ermenek | Ermenek |
| Ermenek | Güneyyurt |
| Ermenek | Kazancı |
| Karaman | Akçaşehir |
| Karaman | Karaman |
| Karaman | Sudurağı |
| Kazımkarabekir | Kazımkarabekir |
| Sarıveliler | Göktepe |
| Sarıveliler | Sarıveliler |
