= Dumlugöze =

- Village
- Location within Turkey Location within Turkey Central Anatolia
- Coordinates: 36°33′N 32°33′E
- Country: Turkey
- Province: Karaman
- District: Sarıveliler
- Elevation: 1,754 m (5,755 ft)
- Population (2022): 1,449
- Time zone: UTC+3 (TRT)

Dumlugöze is a village in Sarıveliler District, Karaman Province, Central Anatolia, Turkey. Its population is 1,449 (2022). It is a high-altitude mountain village situated at the extreme south west of the province. Owing to its high altitude, the village is known for galanthus production Distance to Sarıveliler is about 25 kilometres (16 mi).
