= Elmayurdu =

- Village
- Location within Turkey Location within Turkey Central Anatolia
- Coordinates: 36°40′39″N 32°42′13″E
- Country: Turkey
- Province: Karaman
- District: Ermenek
- Elevation: 1,075 m (3,527 ft)
- Population (2022): 454
- Time zone: UTC+3 (TRT)
- Postal code: 70450
- Area code: 0338

Elmayurdu is a village in Ermenek District, Karaman Province, Central Anatolia, Turkey. Its population is 454 (2022).

Its distance to Ermenek is 17 kilometres (11 mi) and to Karaman is 73 kilometres (45 mi).
