= Ardıçkaya =

- Village
- Location within Turkey Location within Turkey Central Anatolia
- Coordinates: 36°33′N 32°45′E
- Country: Turkey
- Province: Karaman
- District: Ermenek
- Elevation: 1,300 m (4,300 ft)
- Population (2022): 955
- Time zone: UTC+3 (TRT)
- Postal code: 70400
- Area code: 0338

Ardıçkaya (formerly Nadire) is a village in Ermenek District, Karaman Province, Central Anatolia, Turkey. Its population is 955 (2022). It is situated in a high plateau of Taurus Mountains. The distance to Ermenek is 56 kilometres (35 mi) and to Karaman is 200 kilometres (120 mi). The name of the town refers to junipers around the village (Ardıçkaya means "juniper rock"). The old name of the village is Nadire.
