= Görmeli =

- Village
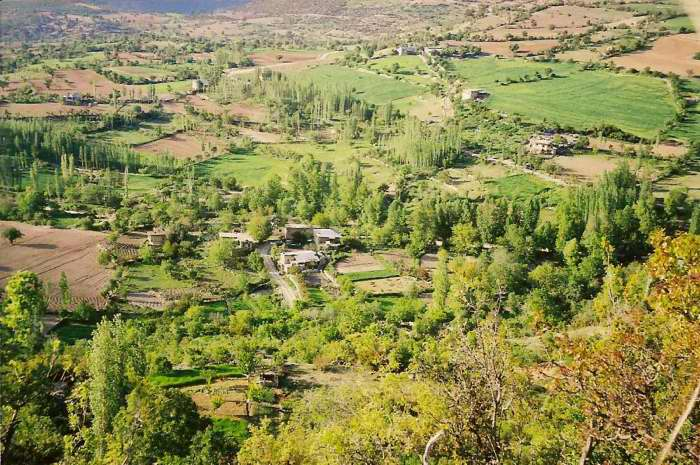
- View of Görmeli from the hills surrounding the village

- Location within Turkey Location within Turkey Central Anatolia
- Coordinates: 36°33′N 32°57′E
- Country: Turkey
- Province: Karaman
- District: Ermenek
- Area: 20 km^{2} (7.7 sq mi)
- Elevation: 700 m (2,300 ft)
- Population (2022): 544
  - Density: 27/km^{2} (70/sq mi)
- Time zone: UTC+3 (TRT)
- Area code: 0338

Görmeli is a village in Ermenek District, Karaman Province, Central Anatolia, Turkey. Its population is 544 (2022). It lies on the hillside of Taurus Mountains.

== Geography ==
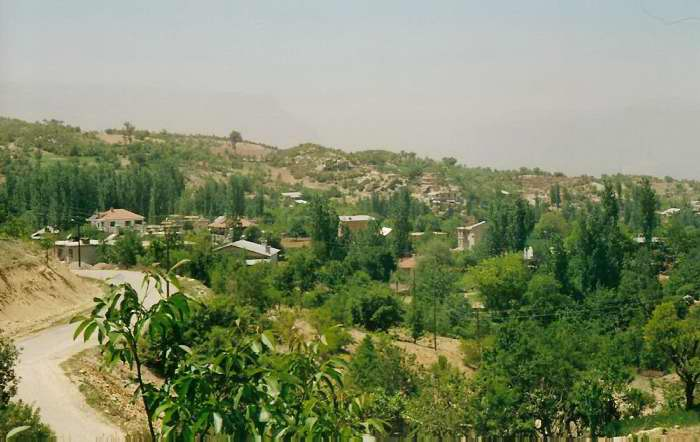
View of Çayır neighbourhood

Görmeli is located in the Karaman Region’s Taurus Mountains range, on the slopes of Taurus Mountains. It is on the south-east side of Ermenek town, in the Karaman province. It is 18 km from the center of Ermenek and 90 km from the touristic towns of the Mediterranean region Anamur. The village is on the main road of Ermenek and Gülnar. It is surrounded by forests and high mountains. The area is very productive, due to watery fields and soft soil. Almost all vegetables and fruits are grown locally. Görmeli presents quite a spectacular sight with its meadows, streams, plants, trees, animals, and the traditional lifestyle of its people.

== History ==
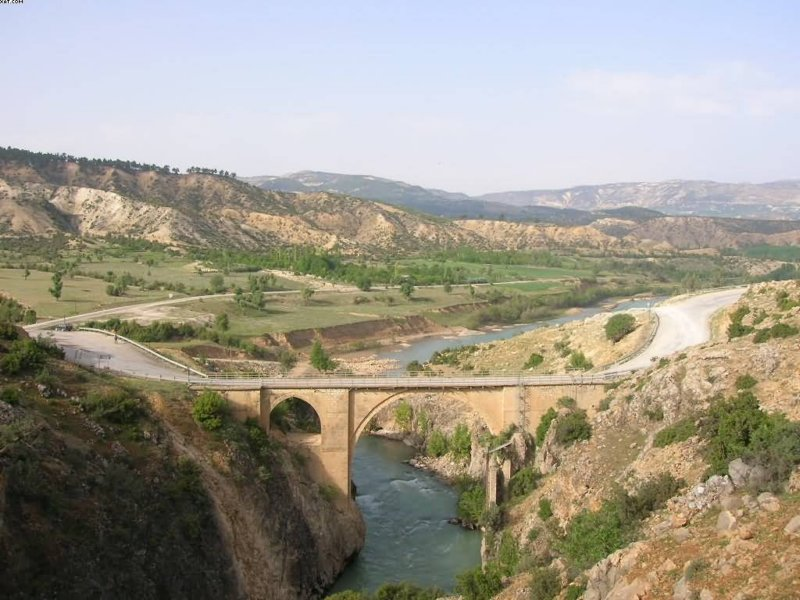
View of Ala Bridge in 2007

The time in which the area first became inhabited is still unknown. However, it is said that people were brought from Adana by the Emirate of Karamanid hundreds of years ago. The Görmeli bridge (also called Ala Köprü), spanned the river Göksu about 5 km (3 mi) from the village. It was constructed by the Karamanid Emirate in 1290. Its length was 27 m and its width was 4.70 m. It was submerged by the Ermenek Dam, completed in 2009.

There is a historical building called Mennan Castle in the Nısa Neighbourhood near Görmeli. Mennan means "place to shelter in". The castle was built with rocks on a perpendicular mountain. It is also known as the castle that Karamanid from the Ottoman Gedik Ahmet Pasha, as a result of which Pir Ahmet Bey committed suicide within it. The castle is in ruins, dilapidated by treasure hunters. Some blame the authorities, whom, they say, did not attach enough importance to this historical building to protect it, with the result that the construction has been suffering from years of neglect.

== Culture ==
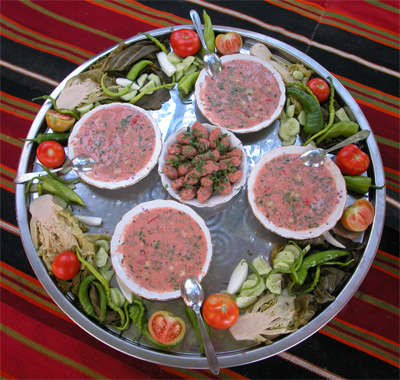
Batırma is a traditional meal

Visitors can taste a traditional water-prepared meal called 'Batırma'. It consists of small wheat pieces, tomatoes, pepper, parsley, sesame, and walnuts. These ingredients are mixed and kneaded with cold water. The meal is served accompanied by fresh peppers, cucumbers, boiled cabbage, eggplants, tomatoes and boiled grape leaves. Another traditional local food is called 'Tarhana'. It is prepared with either minced meat and potatoes. The ingredient is mixed with wheat, tomato sauce, onion, pepper, and parsley. The mixture is kneaded and then shaped like a palm. The pieces are grilled on oak coal.

== Economy ==
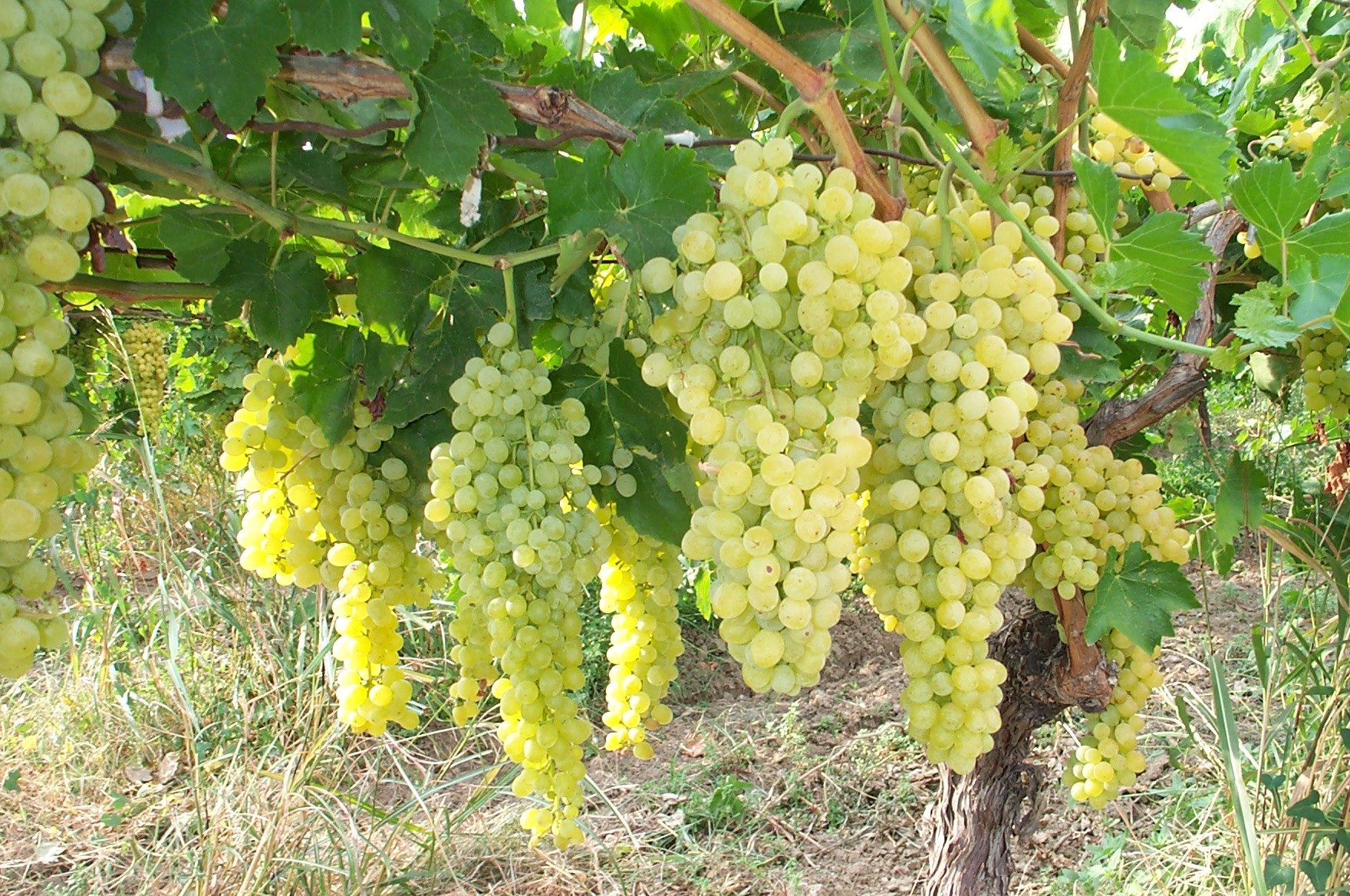
Görmeli's Grapes

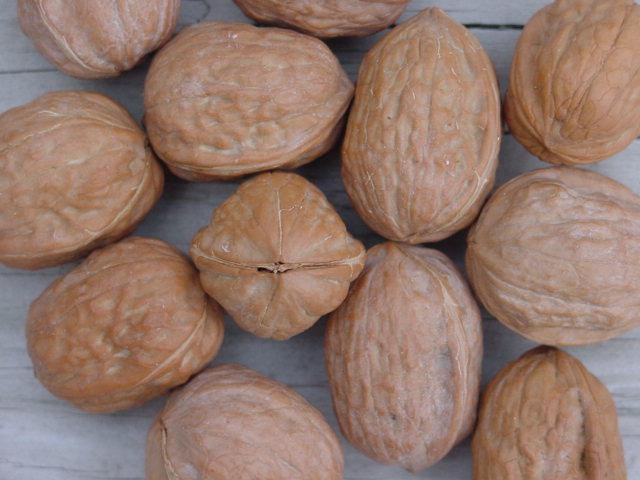
Wallnuts are grown everywhere

The hills and lower sides of Görmeli are not suited to farming. The inhabitants mostly support themselves by growing and selling fruits, vegetables, dairy products, or breeding livestock. "Görmeli's Grapes" are famous and there are grapevines in all fields, as well as apple, fig, walnut, and pomegranate trees. Every family has animals, several goats, a cow, and chickens. Sheep aren't suitable; they cannot adapt mountainous land. In addition the peasants don't eat mutton. Recent years, people grow vaccinated-special fruit saplings on the higher plateaus of the village. This economic activity also contributes budget of village box.

== Neighbourhoods ==
Görmeli village is divided into six neighbourhoods:

- Boyalık
- Tekke
- Kışla
- Tuztaşı
- Köyyakası
- Nısa

== Gallery ==
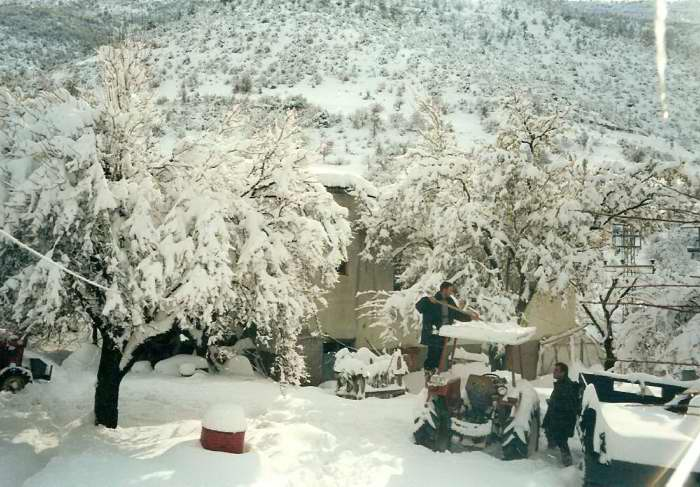
Görmeli in winter

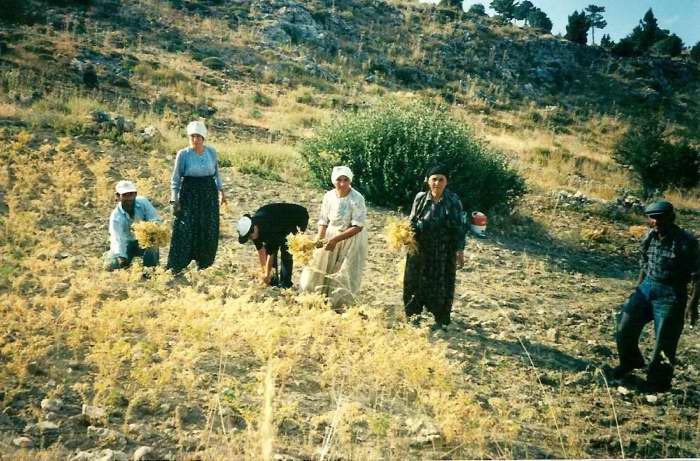
Harvesting chickpeas

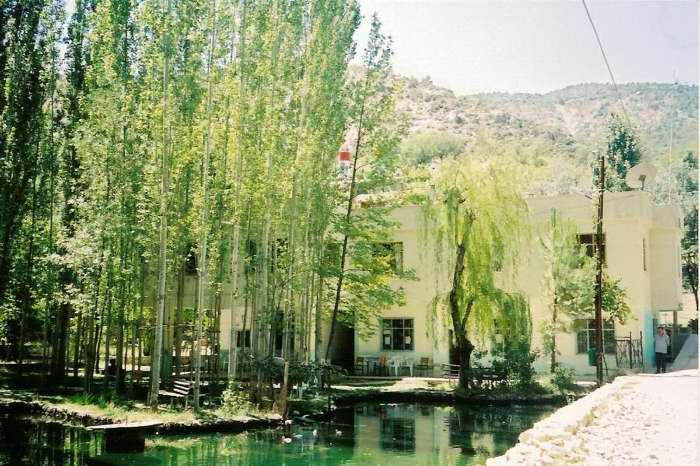
View from the coffee house

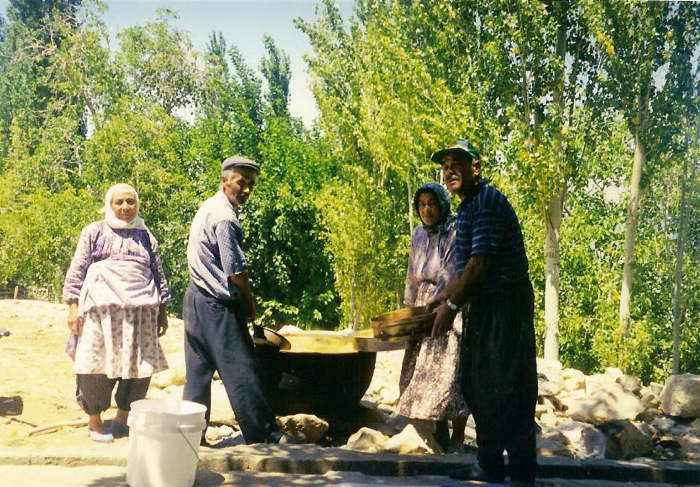
Boiling wheat

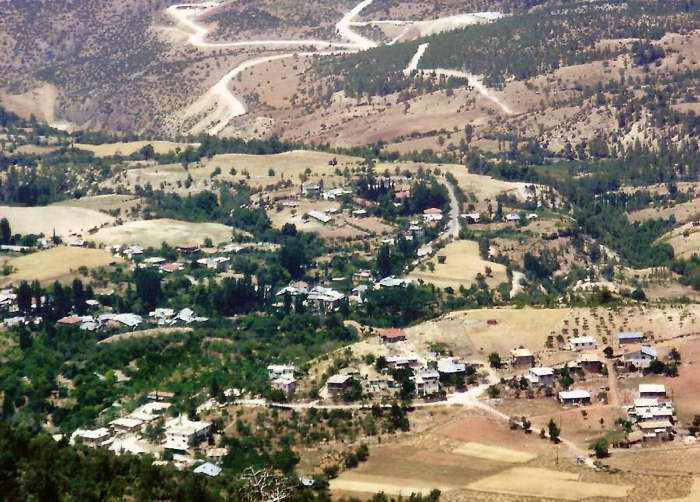
General view from village

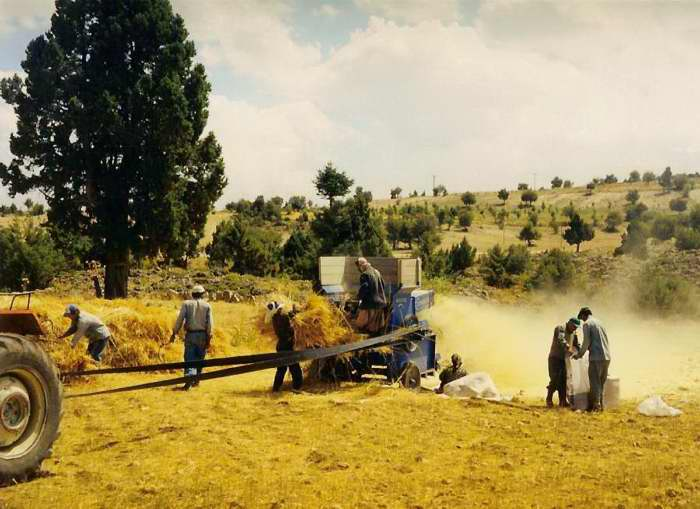
The peasants are winnowing grain

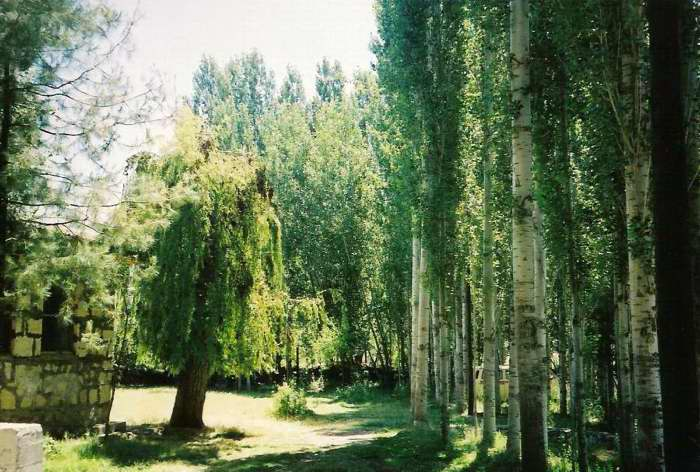
Another view from coffee house

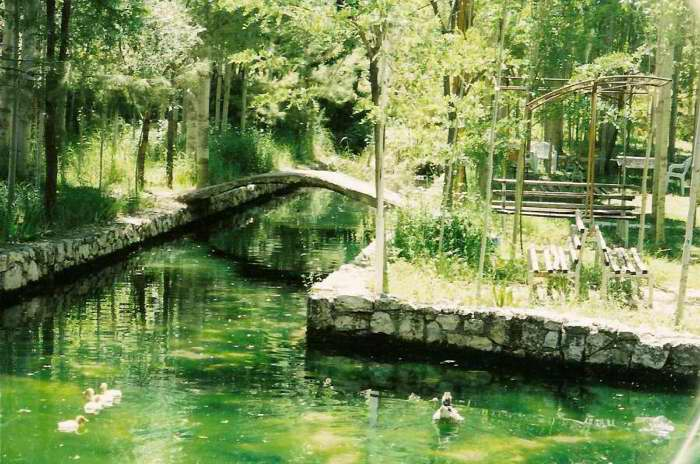
View from Koca Çayır

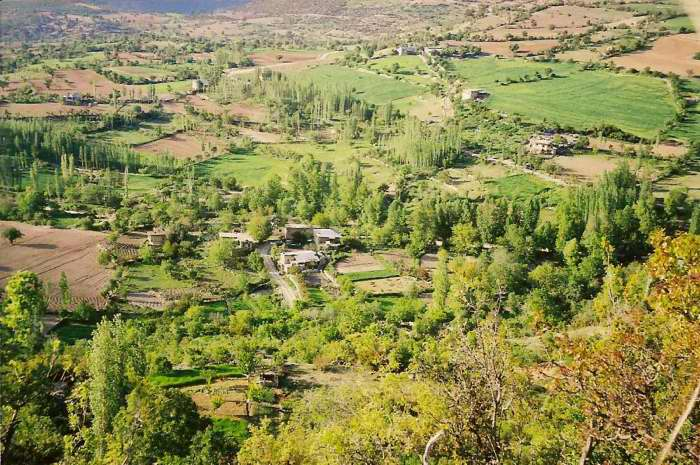
View from the neighbourhood Tekke

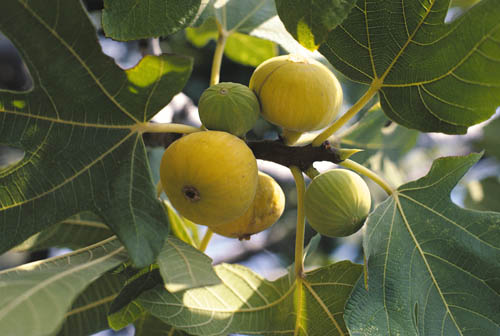
Sweet figs

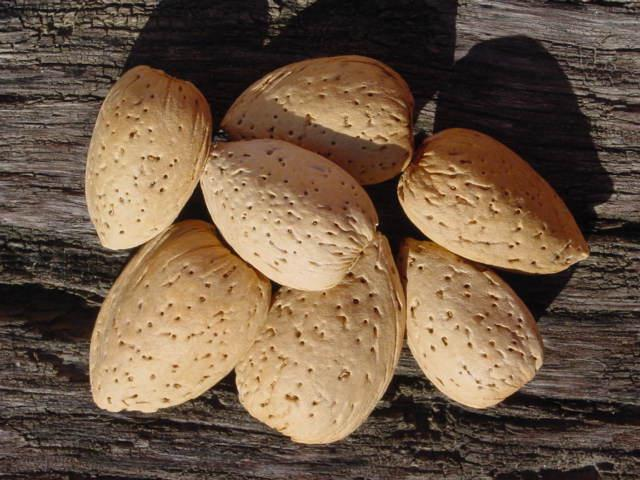
Almonds of Görmeli

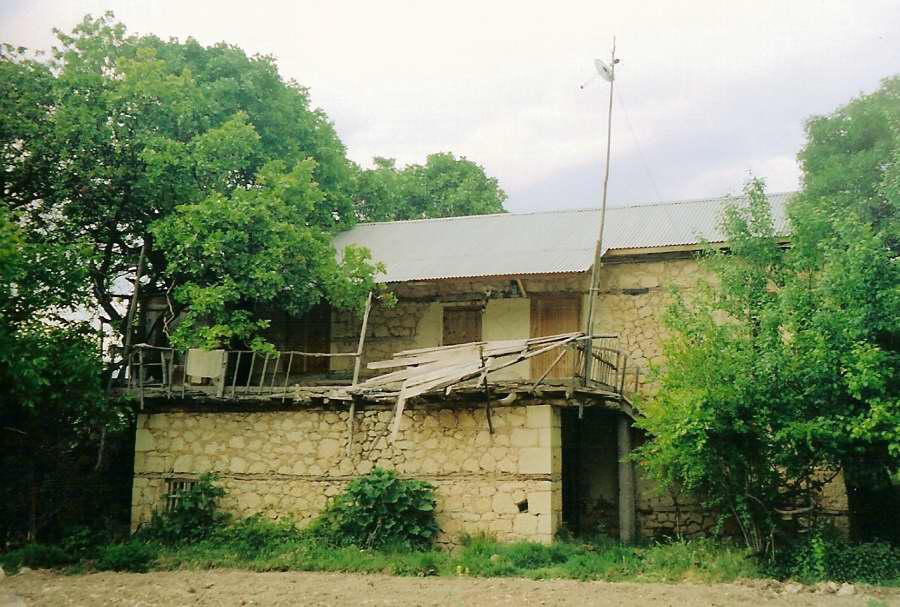
The old houses are made of stone in the village

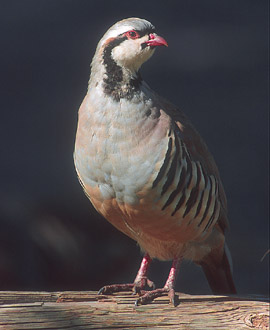
The partridges live on the mountains of Görmeli

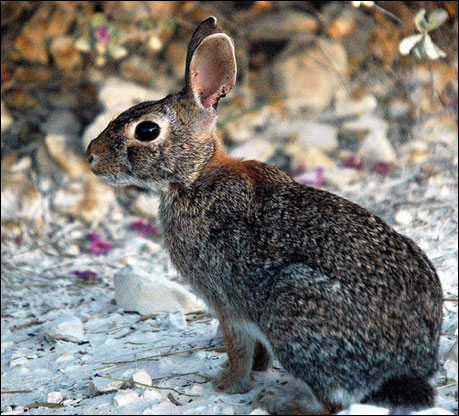
Wild Rabbit

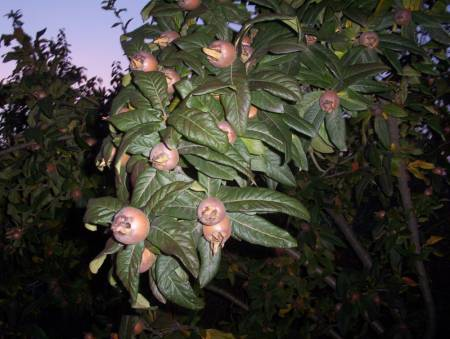
Medlars from village

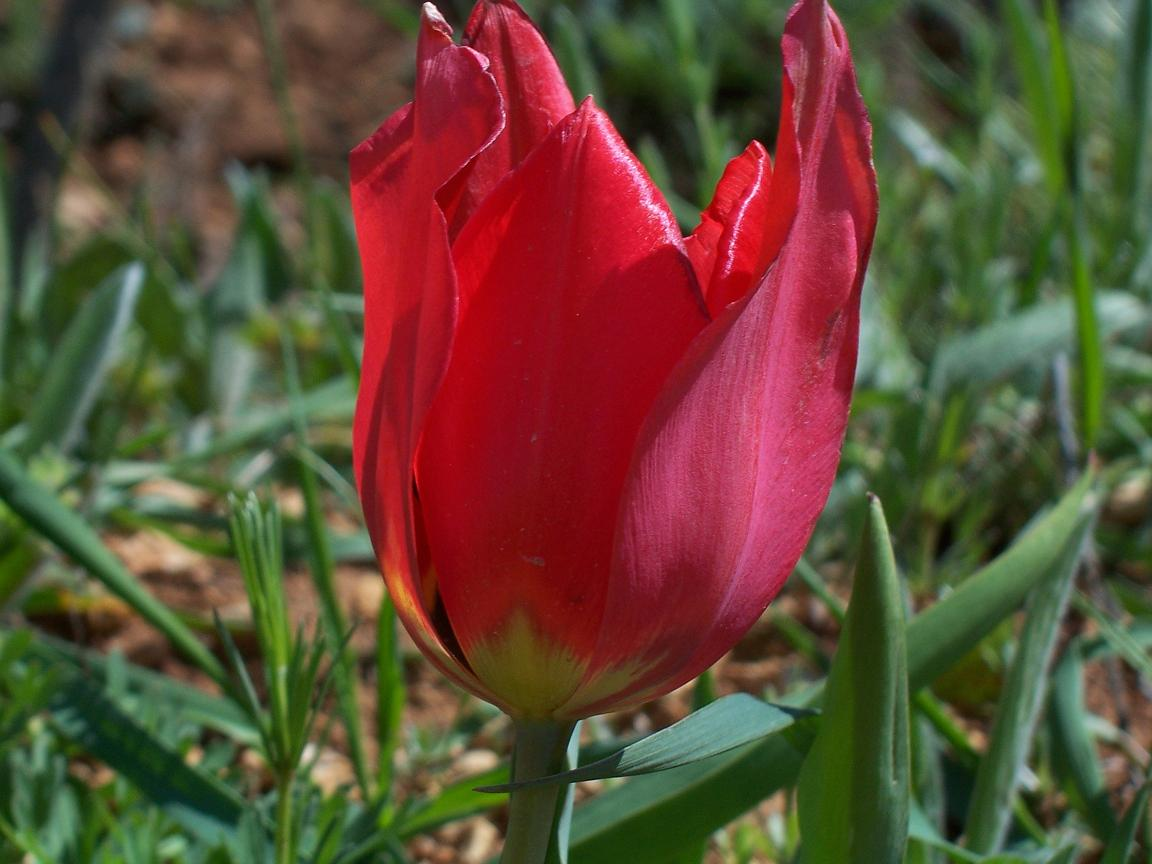
Wild Tulip in Görmeli

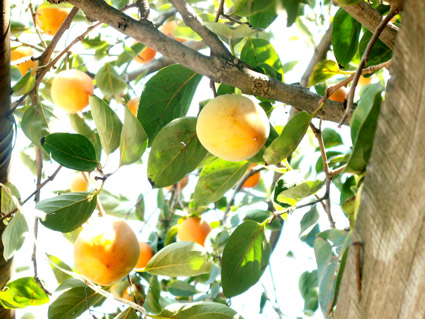
Persimmons from village

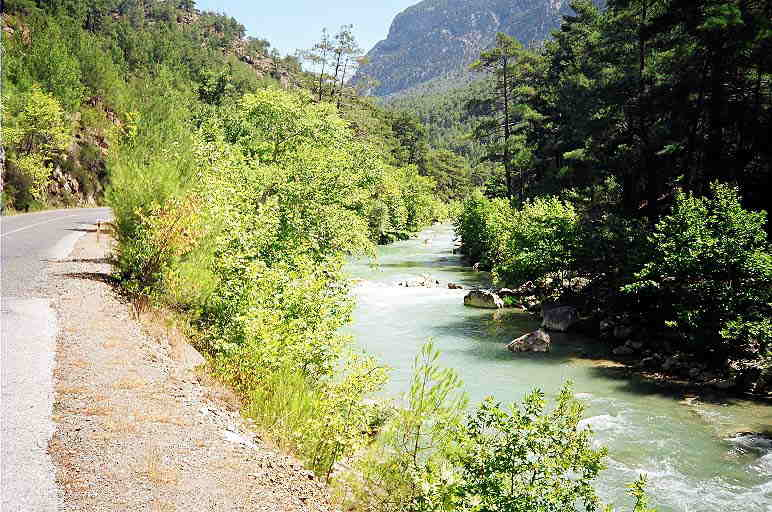
Göksü River near Görmeli
