= Çamlıca, Ermenek =

Çamlıca
- Village
- Location within Turkey Location within Turkey Central Anatolia
- Coordinates: 36°37′04″N 33°01′21″E
- Country: Turkey
- Province: Karaman
- District: Ermenek
- Elevation: 900 m (3,000 ft)
- Population (2022): 320
- Time zone: UTC+3 (TRT)
- Postal code: 70450
- Area code: 0338

Çamlıca (former Muhallar) is a village in Ermenek District, Karaman Province, Central Anatolia, Turkey. Its population is 320 (2022).

Its distance to Ermenek is 21 kilometres (13 mi).
