= Ermenek District =

District of Karaman Province, Turkey

- District
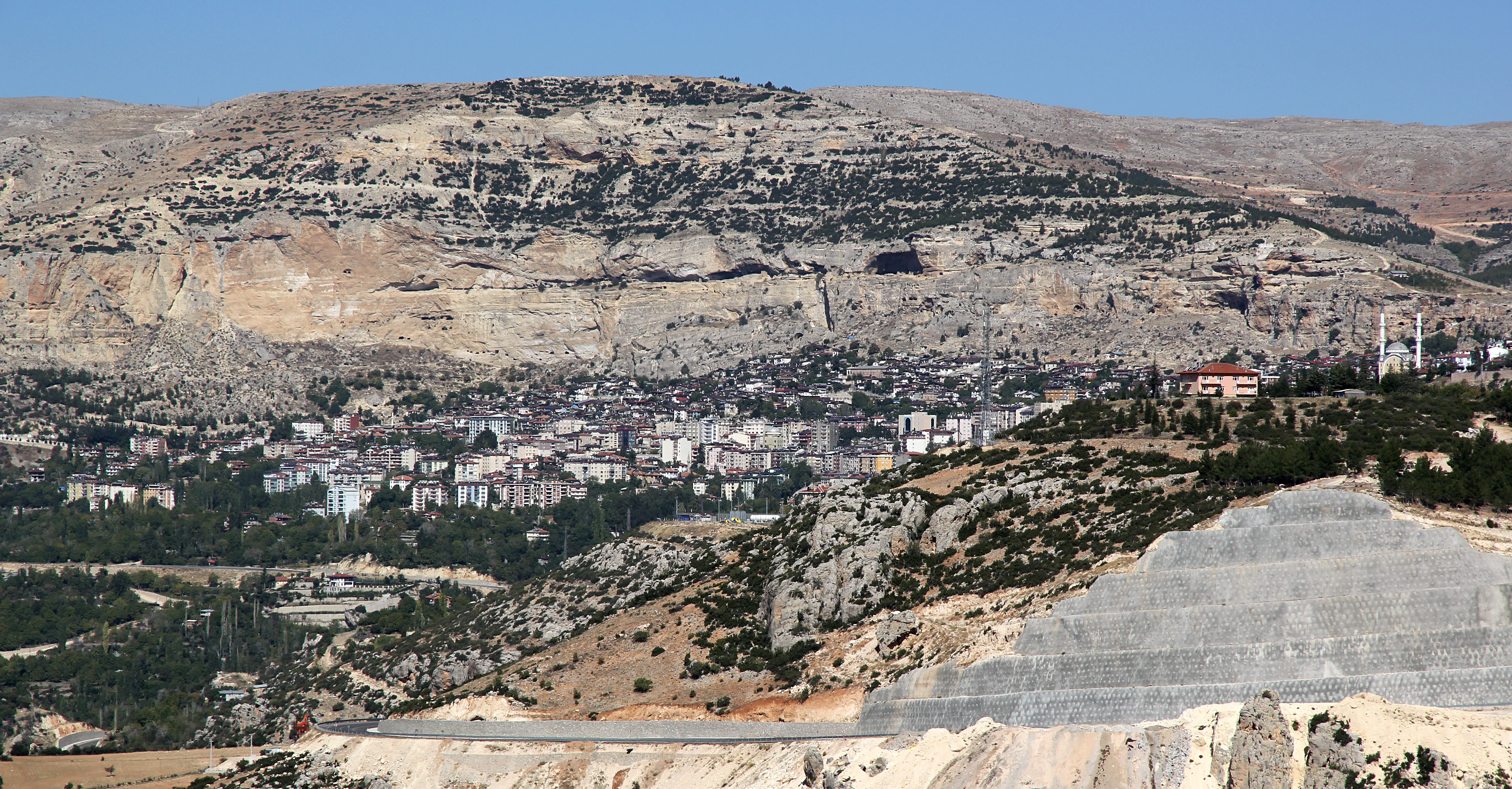
- town of Ermenek and surroundings

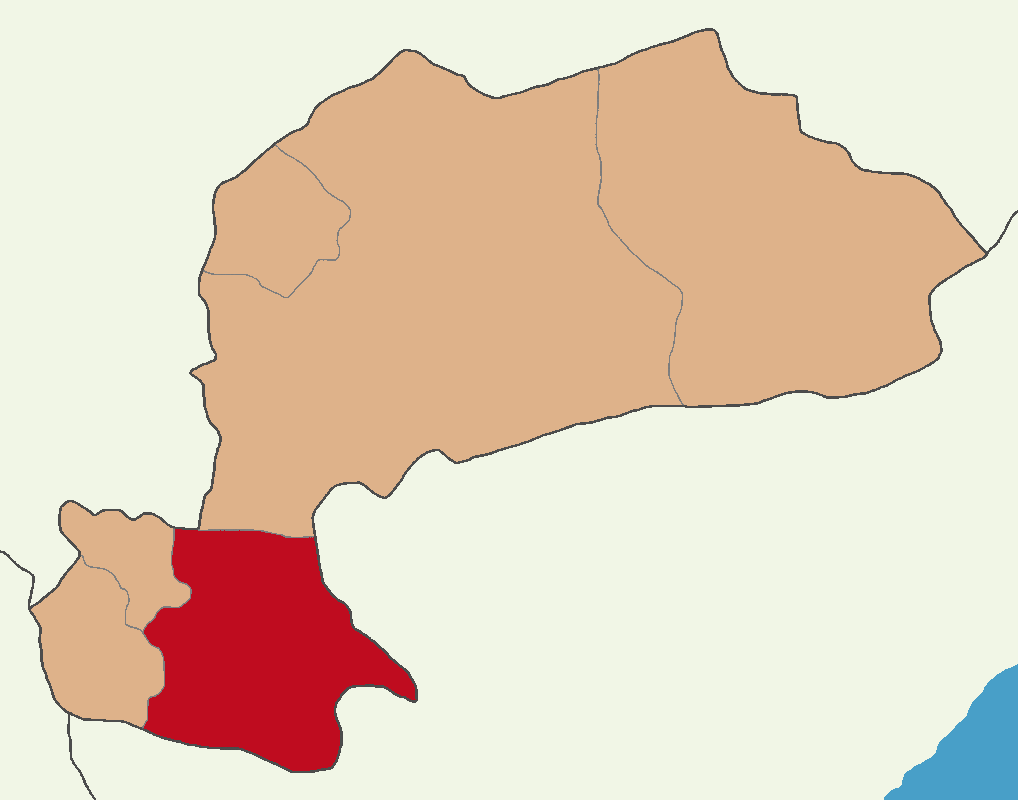
- Map showing Ermenek District in Karaman Province

- Location within Turkey Location within Turkey Central Anatolia
- Coordinates: 36°38′N 32°53′E
- Country: Turkey
- Province: Karaman
- Seat: Ermenek

Government
  - Kaymakam: Hacı Kerim Meral
- Area: 1,242 km^{2} (480 sq mi)
- Population (2022): 27,776
  - Density: 22.36/km^{2} (57.92/sq mi)
- Time zone: UTC+3 (TRT)
- Website: www.ermenek.gov.tr

Ermenek District is a district of the Karaman Province of Turkey. Its seat is the town of Ermenek. Its area is 1,242 km^{2}, and its population is 27,776 (2022). The district forms the core of the plateau region Taşeli.

== Composition ==
There are three municipalities in Ermenek District:

- Ermenek
- Güneyyurt
- Kazancı

There are 26 villages in Ermenek District:

- Ağaççatı
- Ardıçkaya
- Aşağıçağlar
- Balkusan
- Boyalık
- Çamlıca
- Çavuşköy
- Elmayurdu
- Eskice
- Evsin
- Gökçekent
- Gökçeseki
- Görmeli
- İkizçınar
- Katranlı
- Kayaönü
- Olukpınar
- Pamuklu
- Pınarönü
- Sarıvadi
- Tepebaşı
- Yalındal
- Yaylapazarı
- Yerbağ
- Yeşilköy
- Yukarıçağlar
