= Tepebaşı, Ermenek =

Tepebaşı
- Village
- Location within Turkey Location within Turkey Central Anatolia
- Coordinates: 36°40′05″N 32°43′14″E
- Country: Turkey
- Province: Karaman
- District: Ermenek
- Population (2022): 374
- Time zone: UTC+3 (TRT)

Tepebaşı is a village in Ermenek District, Karaman Province, Central Anatolia, Turkey. Its population is 374 (2022).

It is located on a 1,100 metres (3,600 ft) - high hill in a valley. Tepebaşı is an old village. Its name was Bednam during the Byzantine Empire era. It was captured by a certain Halimi Bey during the Karaman Beylik era. During the Ottoman era it was renamed Halimiye and during the Turkish Republic it was renamed Tepebaşı (literally "top of the hill")
