= Güneyyurt =

Settlement in Turkey

- Municipality
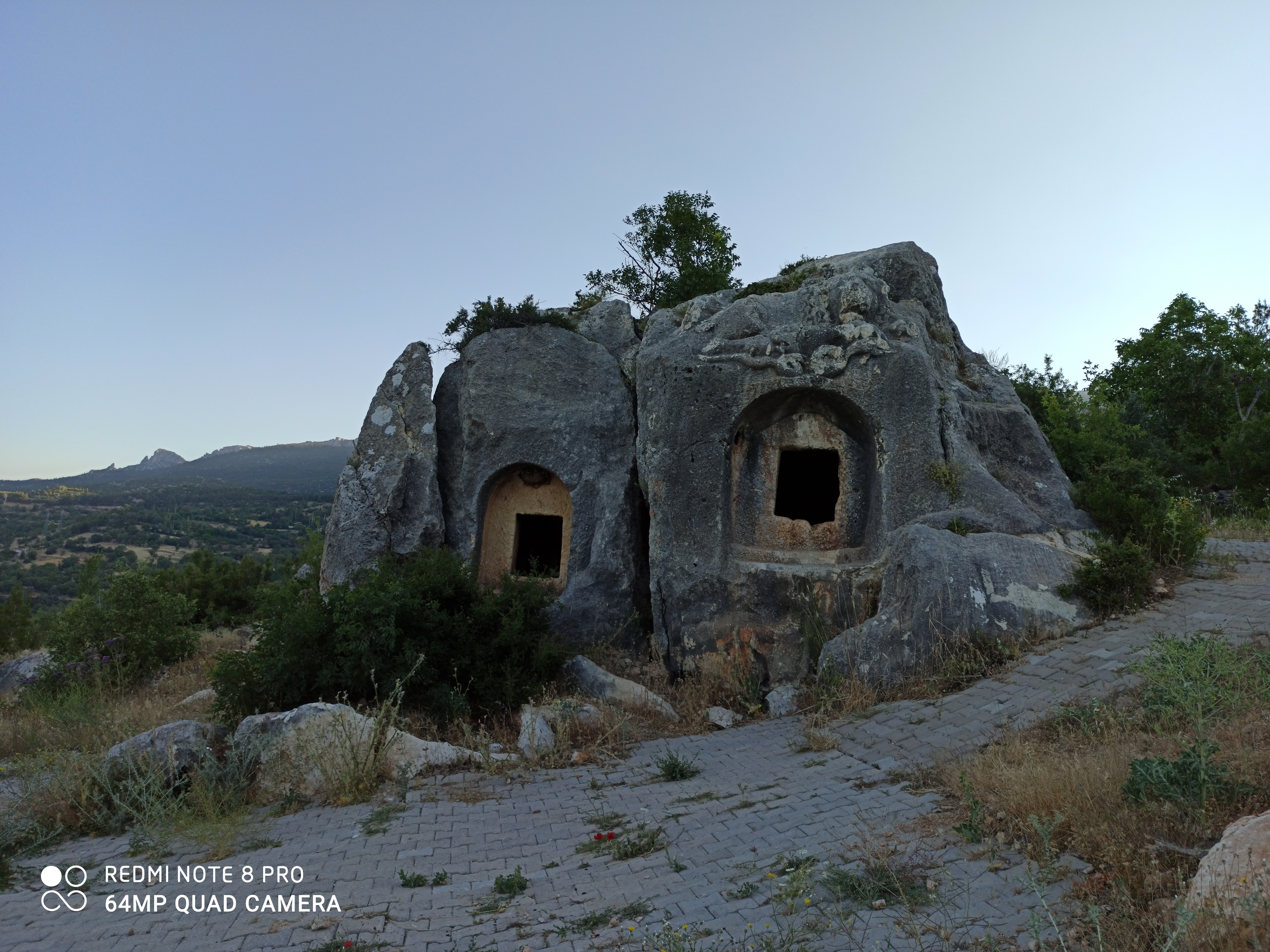
- rockcut grave, Güneyyurt

- Location within Turkey Location within Turkey Central Anatolia
- Coordinates: 36°41′N 32°50′E
- Country: Turkey
- Province: Karaman
- District: Ermenek
- Elevation: 1,054 m (3,458 ft)
- Population (2022): 4,982
- Time zone: UTC+3 (TRT)
- Postal code: 70450
- Area code: 0338

Güneyyurt is a town (belde) in the Ermenek District, Karaman Province, Turkey. Its population is 4,982 (2022).

== Geography ==
Güneyyurt is by the Göksu River valley on Toros Mountains. Distance to Ermenek is 15 kilometres (9.3 mi) and to Karaman is 173 kilometres (107 mi).

== History ==
The former name of Güneyyurt was Gargara. In an ancient shrine carved in rocks there are sculptures of lions, bulls and a snake After Seleucid and Isaurian dominations, in the first century BC, the town became a part of the Roman Empire. During the early years of Christianity, Gargara was one of the towns Barnabas visited before leaving for Cyprus. There are ruins of chapels in caves around Güneyyurt. The town then became a part of the Byzantine Empire. After a brief Turkish domination in the late 11th century the town was captured by the Crusades and for more than a century became a part of the Armenian Kingdom of Cilicia. In the early 13th century, Seljuk Turks annexed the town. After Seljuks were defeated by the Ilkhanid Mongols, the town fell under the Karamanids, a powerful Turkish tribe. In the early 15th century the town was incorporated into the Ottoman Empire.

== Economy ==
Although the climate is convenient for fruit agriculture, because of the rocky landscape, agricultural income is limited. Goats are the preferred in animal husbandry
