= Gökçekent =

- Village
- Location within Turkey Location within Turkey Central Anatolia
- Coordinates: 36°32′15″N 32°51′25″E
- Country: Turkey
- Province: Karaman
- District: Ermenek
- Population (2022): 839
- Time zone: UTC+3 (TRT)

Gökçekent is a village in Ermenek District, Karaman Province, Central Anatolia, Turkey. Its population is 839 (2022). The village's old name is Akmanastır.

There is a historical monastery just west of the village from the Byzantine Empire.
