= Sarıveliler District =

District of Karaman Province, Turkey

- District
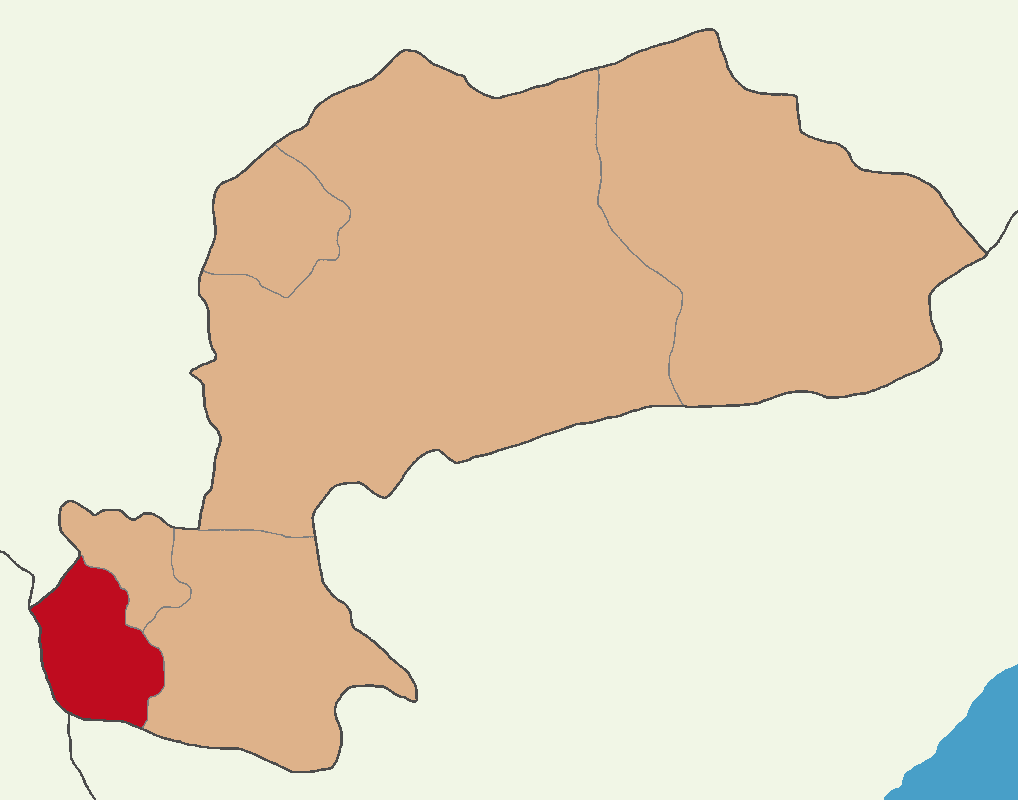
- Map showing Sarıveliler District in Karaman Province

- Location in Turkey Sarıveliler District (Turkey Central Anatolia)
- Coordinates: 36°42′N 32°37′E
- Country: Turkey
- Province: Karaman
- Seat: Sarıveliler

Government
  - Kaymakam: Mehmet Bircan
- Area: 590 km^{2} (230 sq mi)
- Population (2022): 11,251
  - Density: 19/km^{2} (49/sq mi)
- Time zone: UTC+3 (TRT)
- Website: www.sariveliler.gov.tr

Sarıveliler District is a district of the Karaman Province of Turkey. Its seat is the town of Sarıveliler. Its area is 590 km^{2}, and its population is 11,251 (2022).

== Composition ==
There are two municipalities in Sarıveliler District:

- Göktepe
- Sarıveliler

There are 7 villages in Sarıveliler District:

- Civandere
- Civler
- Daran
- Dumlugöze
- Işıklı
- Koçaşlı
- Uğurlu
