= Ermenek Dam =

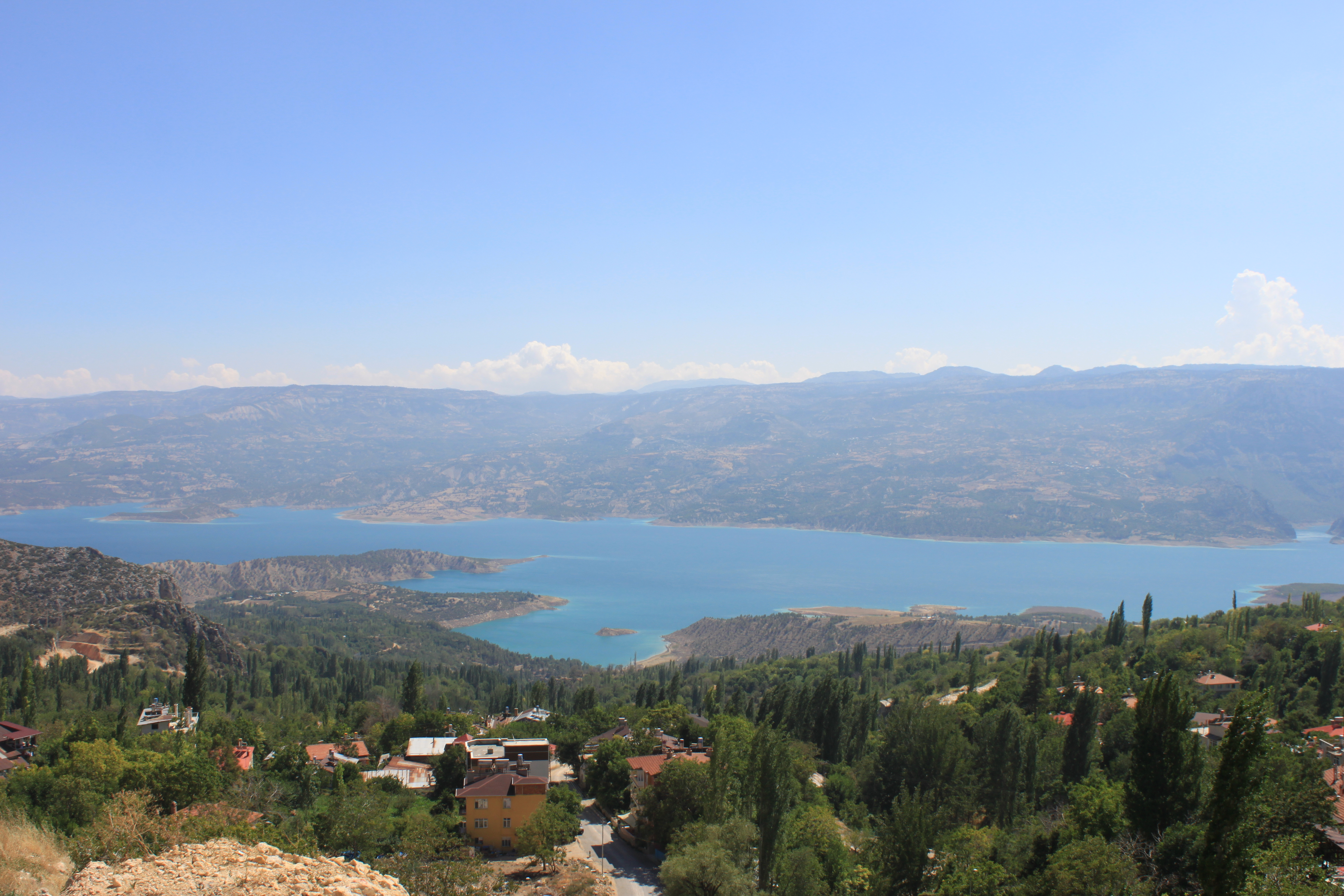
- Ermenek Reservoir. Seen from the city of Ermenek towards the south.

- Location within Turkey
- Location: Turkey
- Coordinates: 36.5682°N 32.965°E
- Status: Operational
- Construction began: 2002
- Opening date: 2009

Dam and spillways
- Type of dam: Arch, double-curvature
- Impounds: Göksu River
- Height: 210 m (689 ft)
- Length: 132 m (433 ft)
- Width (crest): 7 m (23 ft)
- Width (base): 25 m (82 ft)
- Dam volume: 272 m^{3} (356 cu yd)

Reservoir
- Total capacity: 4,582,000,000 m^{3} (3,714,688 acre⋅ft)
- Surface area: 59 km^{2} (23 mi^{2})

Power Station
- Hydraulic head: 310 m (1,017 ft) (gross)
- Turbines: 2 x 150 MW Francis-type
- Installed capacity: 300 MW
- Annual generation: 1048 GWh

The Ermenek Dam is a double-curvature concrete arch dam located on the Göksu River in Karaman Province, Turkey. The 210 m (689 ft) tall dam (218 m (715 ft) from thalweg level) was the highest in Turkey at the time of its construction and currently ranks third after Deriner Dam and Yusufeli Dam. The development was backed by the Turkish State Hydraulic Works. Completed in 2009, the primary purpose of the dam is to support its 300 MW power station. The Görmeli Ottoman bridge from 1290 (also called Ala Köprü) was submerged as a result of the completion of the Ermenek Dam.

== Ermenek Consortium ==
Ermenek Dam was constructed by the Ermenek Consortium that was specially created for this project. Member companies of the Consortium are BM Muhendislik ve Insaat A.S. (pilot and leader of the civil group), Alpine Bau GmbH, Pöyry Energy GmbH (engineer), Alstom Austria AG (financial coordinator and leader of the E&M group), VA TECH HYDRO GmbH & Co. and Voith Hydro GmbH & Co.

The Consortium was also responsible for provision of full foreign financing for the project, under terms agreeable to the Turkish Treasury.

== Erik Regulator and HEPP ==
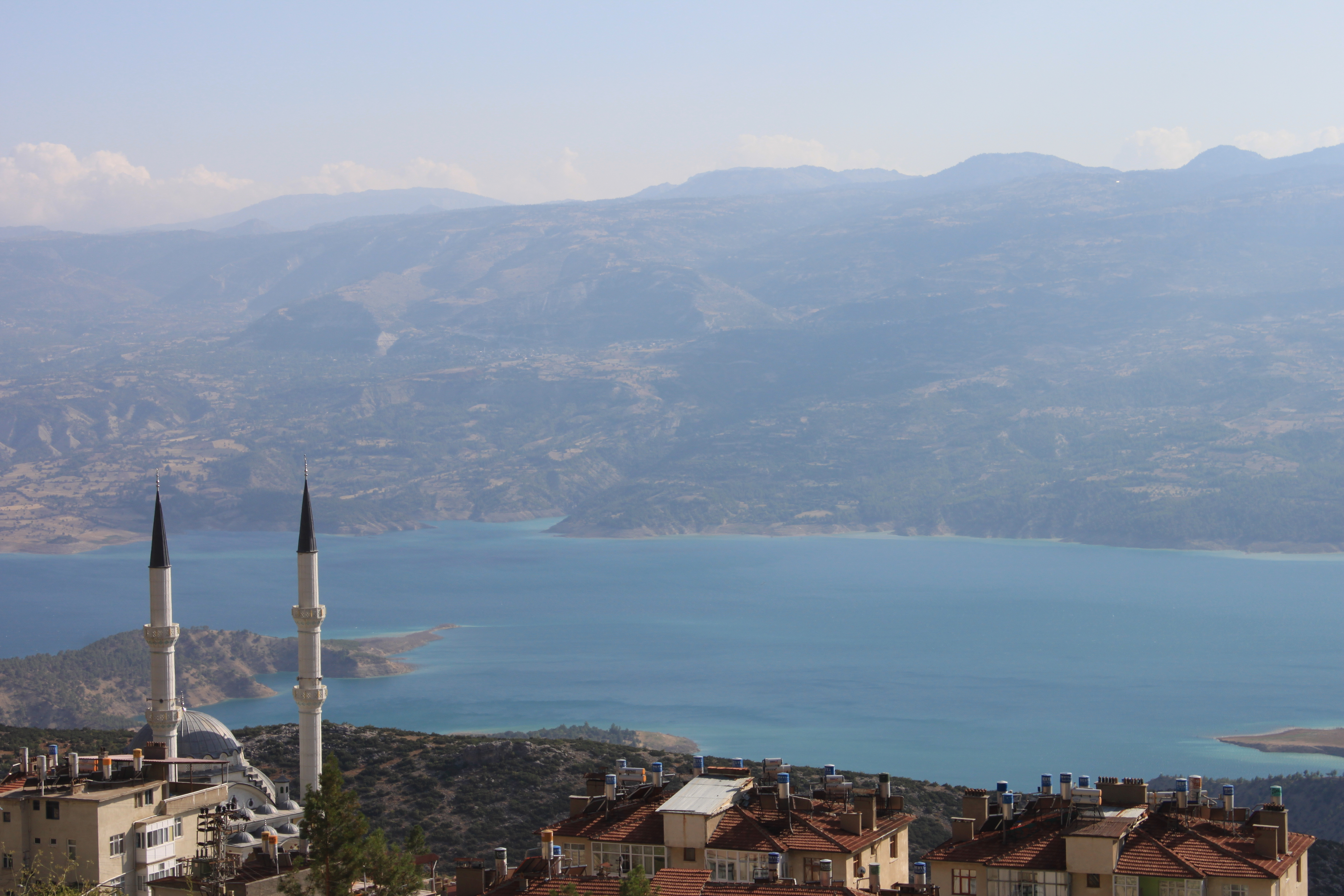
Ahmet Keleşoğlu mosque in Ermenek and the Ermenek Reservoir.

The Ermenek Project also comprises a second power facility named Erik Regulator and HEPP, which is located on the Eric Creek that flows into Ermenek River. Erik Regulator takes water from 815,0m elevation, transmits it through the Erik Pressure Tunnel into the Erik Power Cavern. The power cavern has an installed power capacity of 2*4,455 MW (total 8,91 MW), thereby raising the Ermenek project total to 308,91 MW. Water discharged from the Erik Power Cavern feeds into the Ermenek Dam system at the Ermenek Valve Chamber.

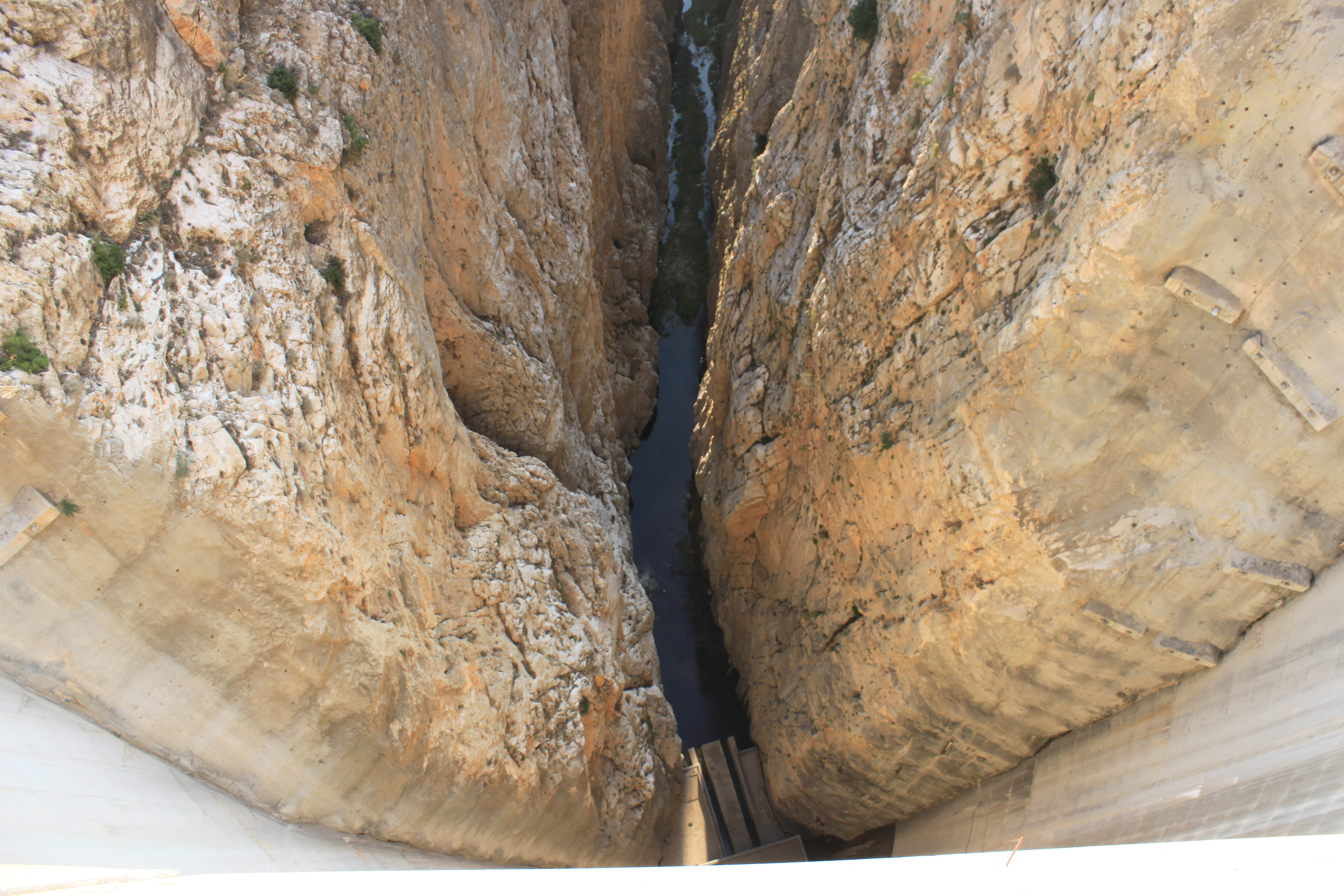
View from the dam into the Ermenek Canyon.

== See also ==
- List of dams and reservoirs in Turkey
