= Kazancı, Karaman =

Kazancı
- Municipality
- Location in Turkey Kazancı (Turkey Central Anatolia)
- Coordinates: 36°30′N 32°52′E
- Country: Turkey
- Province: Karaman
- District: Ermenek
- Elevation: 1,170 m (3,840 ft)
- Population (2022): 2,151
- Time zone: UTC+3 (TRT)
- Postal code: 70460
- Area code: 0338

Kazancı is a town (belde) in the Ermenek District, Karaman Province, Turkey. Its population is 2,151 (2022). It is situated in Toros Mountains. According to town page the name of the town may refer to Kazancıklı region in Balkan Province of Turkmenistan from where the original residents of the town migrated.
