= Sarıveliler =

- Municipality
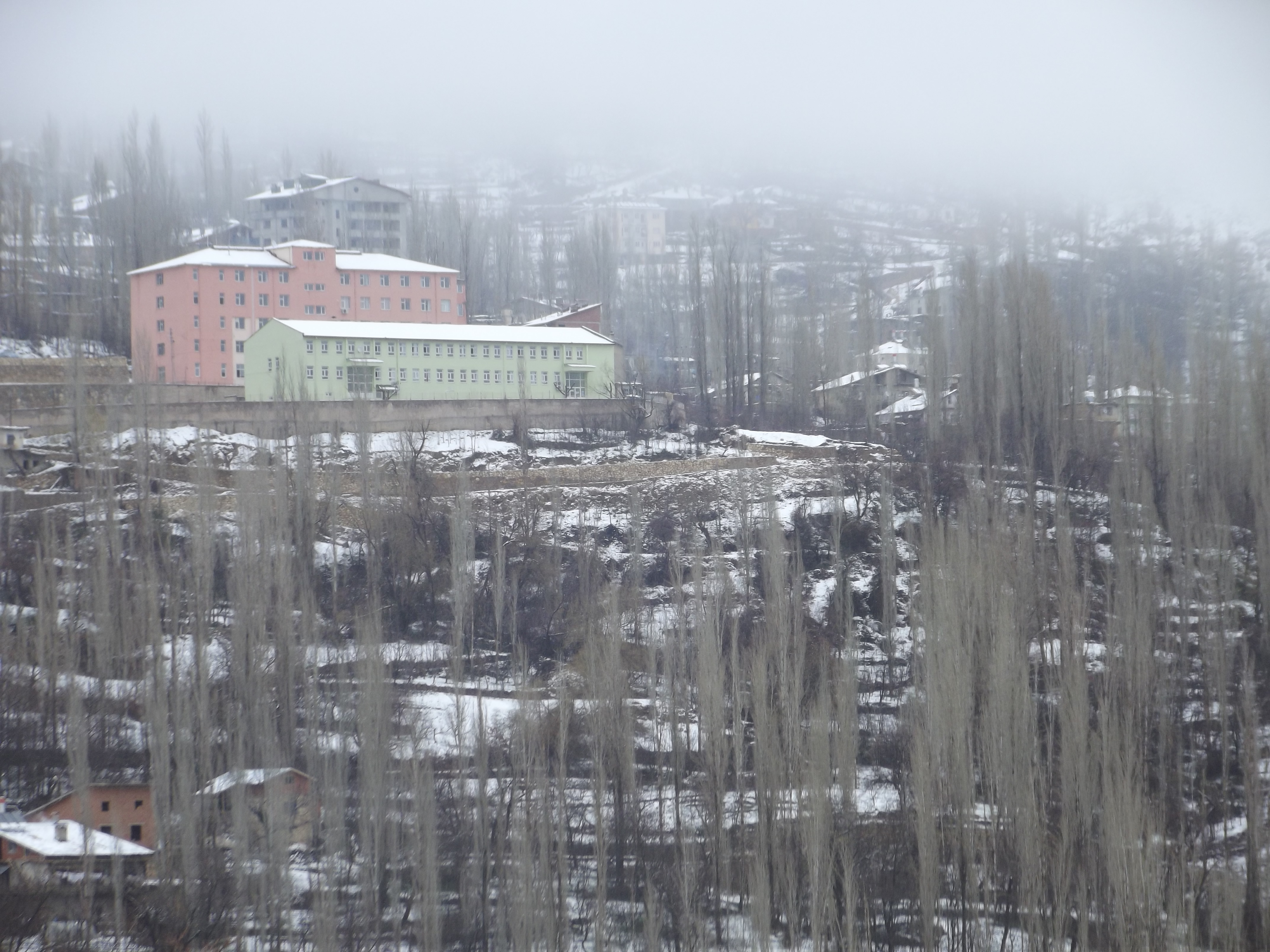
- Sarıveliler

- Location within Turkey Location within Turkey Central Anatolia
- Coordinates: 36°41′47″N 32°37′13″E
- Country: Turkey
- Province: Karaman
- District: Sarıveliler

Government
  - Mayor: Halil Kulak (GP)
- Elevation: 1,401 m (4,596 ft)
- Population (2022): 5,274
- Time zone: UTC+3 (TRT)
- Area code: 0338
- Website: www.sariveliler.bel.tr

Sarıveliler is a town in Karaman Province in the Central Anatolia region of Turkey. It is the seat of Sarıveliler District. Its population is 5,274 (2022). Its elevation is 1,401 m (4,596 ft).

== History ==
There is no exact information about town's history. It is assumed that people settled down the town at Roman Empire times. Additionally, by the archeological founds near Göktepe and Uğurlu, people started to live in Sarıveliler in 2000 B.C.
