= Göktepe =

Settlement in Turkey

- Municipality
- Location in Turkey Göktepe (Turkey Central Anatolia)
- Coordinates: 36°38′N 32°37′E
- Country: Turkey
- Province: Karaman
- District: Sarıveliler
- Elevation: 1,335 m (4,380 ft)
- Population (2022): 2,051
- Time zone: UTC+3 (TRT)
- Postal code: 70810
- Area code: 0338

Göktepe (former Fariske) is a town (belde) in the Sarıveliler District, Karaman Province, Turkey. Its population was 2,051 in 2022.

== Geography ==
Göktepe is a mountain town in the Toros Mountains with an altitude of about 1,300 metres (4,300 ft). Göktepe is quite detached from the main highways. The distance to Karaman is 170 kilometres (110 mi).

== Economy ==
Göktepe is a typical agricultural town. Main crops are apples, grapes, cherries and walnuts.
