= Ermenek =

- Municipality
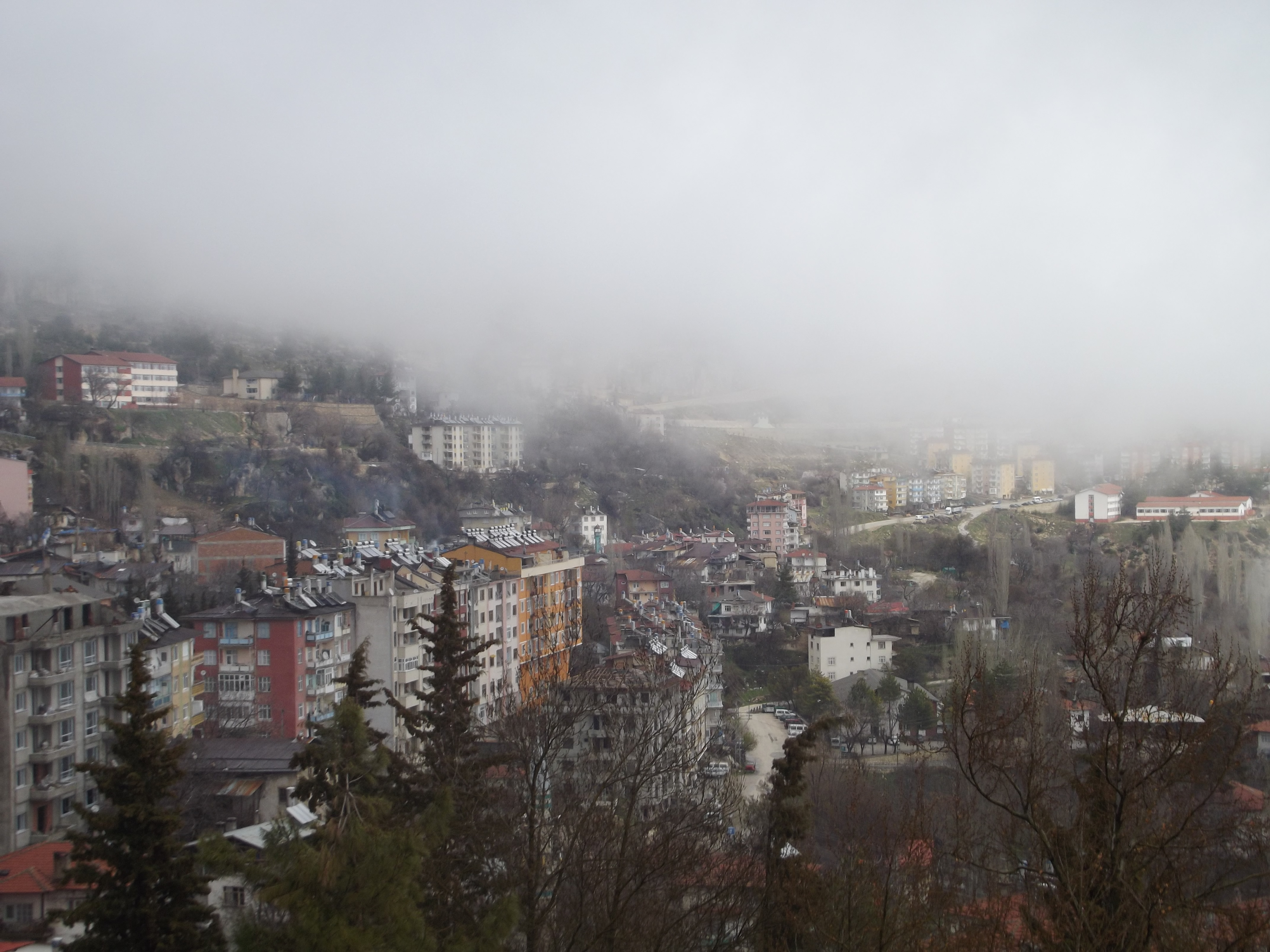
- Ermenek, April 2012

- Location within Turkey Location within Turkey Central Anatolia
- Coordinates: 36°38′20″N 32°53′33″E
- Country: Turkey
- Province: Karaman
- District: Ermenek

Government
  - Mayor: Mustafa Bozcu (CHP)
- Elevation: 1,196 m (3,924 ft)
- Population (2022): 11,629
- Time zone: UTC+3 (TRT)
- Postal code: 70400
- Area code: 0338
- Website: www.ermenek.bel.tr

Ermenek is a town in Karaman Province in the Mediterranean region of Turkey. It is the seat of Ermenek District. Its population is 11,629 (2022). As ancient Germanicopolis (in Isauria; has namesakes), a former bishopric, it remains a Latin Catholic titular see.

== Names ==
The town was historically known as Germanicopolis (Greek: Γερμανικόπολις), Germanig and possibly Clibanus; which later mutated to Ermenek.

== History ==
Germanicopolis was an ancient town in the Roman province of Isauria. The city took its name from Germanicus, grandnephew and grandson-in-law of first Emperor Augustus, as several others.

The Crusaders sustained a great defeat at the hands of the Seljuks near the city in 1098. It passed to the Turkish dynasty of the Karamanids and became a centre of the Afşar Turks in 1228. During the Karamanid period, several of Ermenek's historical mosques were constructed, notably : Akca Mosque (1300), Ermenek Grand Mosque (1302), Sipas Mosque (1306) and Meydan mosque (1436).

It was later incorporated into the Ottoman Empire, becoming part of the Karaman Eyalet, where it was the second most important town after Karaman itself.

== Ecclesiastical history ==
No later than the 5th century, Germanicopolis became a suffragan bishopric of the Archdiocese of Seleucia in Isauria, in the sway of the Patriarchate of Antioch.

Four of its bishops are known during the Byzantine government :

- Tyrannus, participant at the Council of Chalcedon in 451
- Bisulas in the sixth century
- Eustathius, participant at the Second Council of Nicaea in 797
- Basil(eus), participant at the Council of Constantinople in 879-880 which reinstated that Byzantine capital's Patriarch Photius 878

=== Titular see ===
The diocese was nominally restored no later than 1717 as Latin Titular bishopric of Germanicopolis (Latin) / Germanicopoli (Curiate Italian) / Germanicopolitan(us) (Latin adjective).

It is vacant since decades, having had the following incumbents, so far of the fitting Episcopal (lowest) rank :

- Gottfried Langwerth von Simmern (1717.05.10 – death 1741.06.19) as Auxiliary Bishop Diocese of Regensburg (Germany) (1717.05.10 – 1741.06.19)
- Giacomo Filippo Consoli (1741.11.27 – 1743.12.02) (Italian), as Apostolic Administrator of Diocese of Acquapendente (1741.12.09 – 1743.12.02); later Bishop of Amelia (Italy) (1743.12.02 – death 1770.07)
- Michael Ignatius Frivaisz (1744.02.03 – death 1748.10.07) no actual prelature
- Archbishop James Butler (1773.03.15 – 1774.05.17) as Coadjutor Archbishop of Cashel (Ireland) (1773.03.15 – 1774.05.17), next succeeding as Metropolitan Archbishop of Cashel (1774.05.17 – death 1791.07.29)
- Bishop-elect Lorenzo D’Antoni (1815.12.18 – ?) (Italian), no actual prelature
- Johann Michael von Sailer (1822.09.27 – 1829.10.23) as Coadjutor Bishop of Diocese of Regensburg (Germany) (1822.09.27 – 1829.10.23), next succeeding as Bishop of Regensburg (1829.10.23 – 1832.05.20)
- Manuel José Pardio Lizama (1840.04.27 – death 1861.05) as Auxiliary Bishop of Yucatán (Mexico) (1840.04.27 – 1861.05)
- Joseph Larocque (1867.01.15 – death 1887.11.18) as emeritate; previously Titular Bishop of Cydonia (1852.07.06 – 1860.06.22) as Coadjutor Bishop of Montréal (Quebec, Canada) (1852.07.06 – 1860.06.22), Bishop of Saint-Hyacinthe (Canada) (1860.06.22 – 1866.02.04)
- Joseph-Auguste Chevalier, Paris Foreign Missions Society (M.E.P.) (born France) (1873.11.11 – death 1880.03.25) as Apostolic Vicar of Mysore (British India) (1873.11.11 – 1880.03.25)
- André-Albert Blais (1889.12.28 – 1891.02.06) as Coadjutor Bishop of Saint-Germain de Rimouski (Canada) (1889.12.28 – 1891.02.06), next succeeded as Bishop of Saint-Germain de Rimouski (1891.02.06 – death 1919.01.23)
- John Conmy (1892.05.25 – 1893.04.23) as Coadjutor Bishop of Killala (Ireland) (1892.05.25 – 1893.04.23), next succeeded as

Bishop of Killala (1893.04.23 – death 1911.08.26)

- Augustin Dontenwill, Missionary Oblates of Mary Immaculate (O.M.I.) (1897.04.19 – 1899.06.01) as Coadjutor Bishop of New Westminster (BC, Canada) (1897.04.19 – 1899.06.01), next succeeding as Bishop of New Westminster (1899.06.01 – 1908.09.19), Metropolitan Archbishop of Vancouver (BC, Canada) (1908.09.19 – 1908.09.21), Superior General of Missionary Oblates of Mary Immaculate (Oblates) (1908.09.20 – 1931.11.30) and Titular Archbishop of Ptolemais in Phoenicia (1909.01.19 – death 1931.11.30)
- Tobias Mullen (1899.08.10 – death 1900.04.22) as emeritate, formerly Bishop of Erie (USA) (1868.03.03 – 1899.08.10)
- Joseph Maria Koudelka (1907.11.29 – 1913.08.06) first as Auxiliary Bishop of Diocese of Cleveland (USA) (1907.11.29 – 1911.09.04), then as Auxiliary Bishop of Archdiocese of Milwaukee (USA) (1911.09.04 – 1913.08.06); later Bishop of Superior (USA) (1913.08.06 – death 1921.06.24)
- Thomas Joseph Shahan (1914.07.24 – death 1932.03.09) as Auxiliary Bishop of Archdiocese of Baltimore (USA) (1914.07.24 – 1932.03.09)
- Francesco Joosten, Scheutists (C.I.C.M.) (born Netherlands) (1932.06.14 – 1946.04.11) as last Apostolic Vicar of Datongfu 大同府 (at Datong, China) (1932.06.17 – 1946.04.11); next promoted first Bishop of Datong 大同 (China) (1946.04.11 – 1947.11.20), emeritate as Titular Bishop of Sagalassus (1947.11.20 – death 1948.05.02)
- Aurelian Bilgeri, Benedictine Order (O.S.B.) (born Germany) (1947.06.12 – 1951.01.11) as last Apostolic Vicar of Eshowe (South Africa) (1947.06.12 – 1951.01.11), next promoted first Bishop of Eshowe (1951.01.11 – death 1973.07.24)
- Jan Klooster, Lazarists (C.M.) (1953.02.19 – 1961.01.03) as last Apostolic Vicar of Surabaia (Java, Indonesia) (1953.02.19 – 1961.01.03), promoted first Bishop of Surabaya (Indonesia) (1961.01.03 – retired 1982), died 1990
- Lionello Berti, O.M.I. (born Italy) (1962.06.18 – death 1968.02.24) first as Auxiliary Bishop of Apostolic Vicariate of Vientiane (Laos) (1962.06.18 – 1963.03.01), then as Apostolic Vicar of Luang Prabang (Laos) (1963.03.01 – 1968.02.24).

== Notable natives ==
- Lütfi Elvan (born 1962), mining engineer, politician and government minister

== Gallery ==
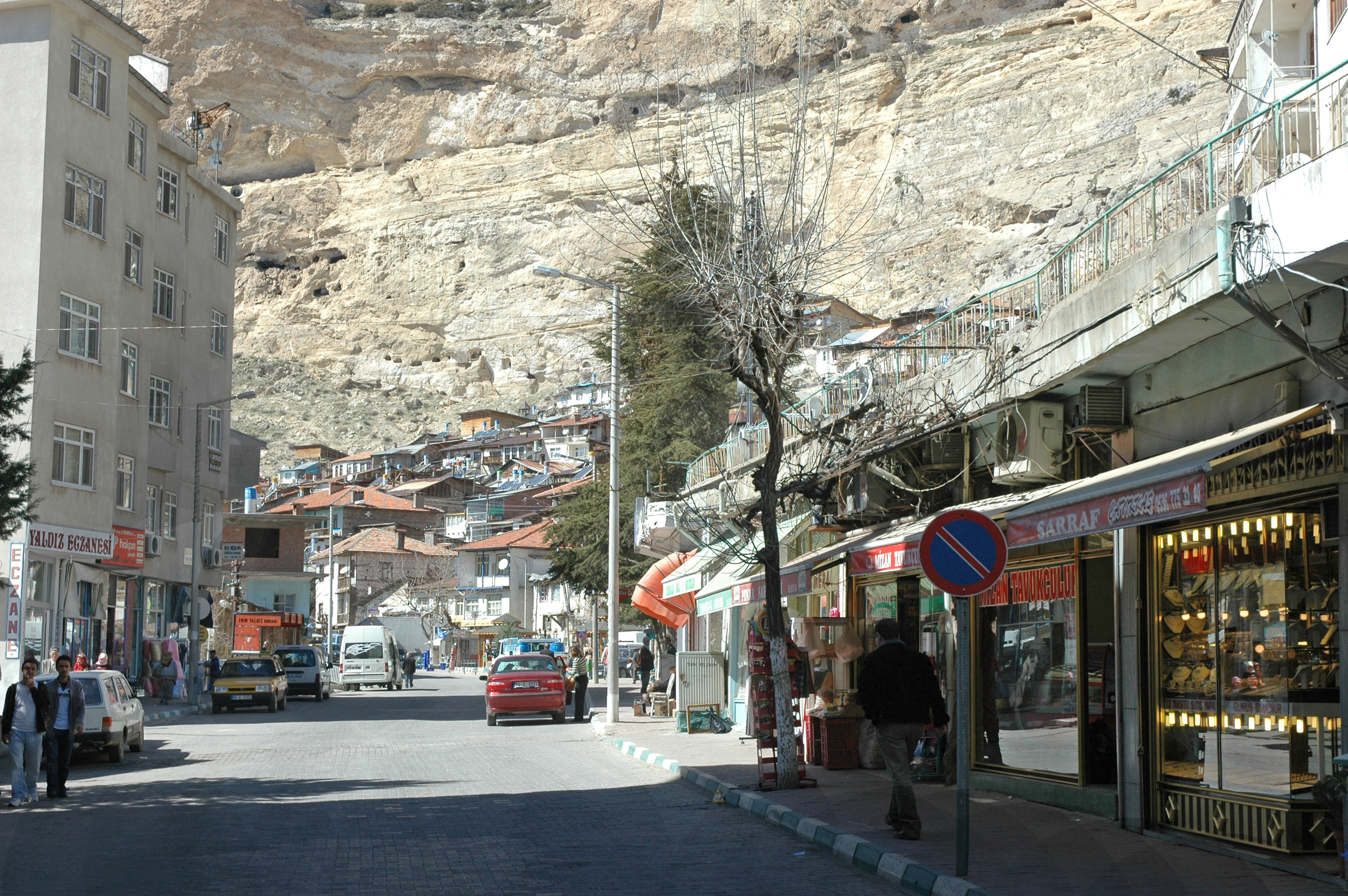
Ermenek Town view

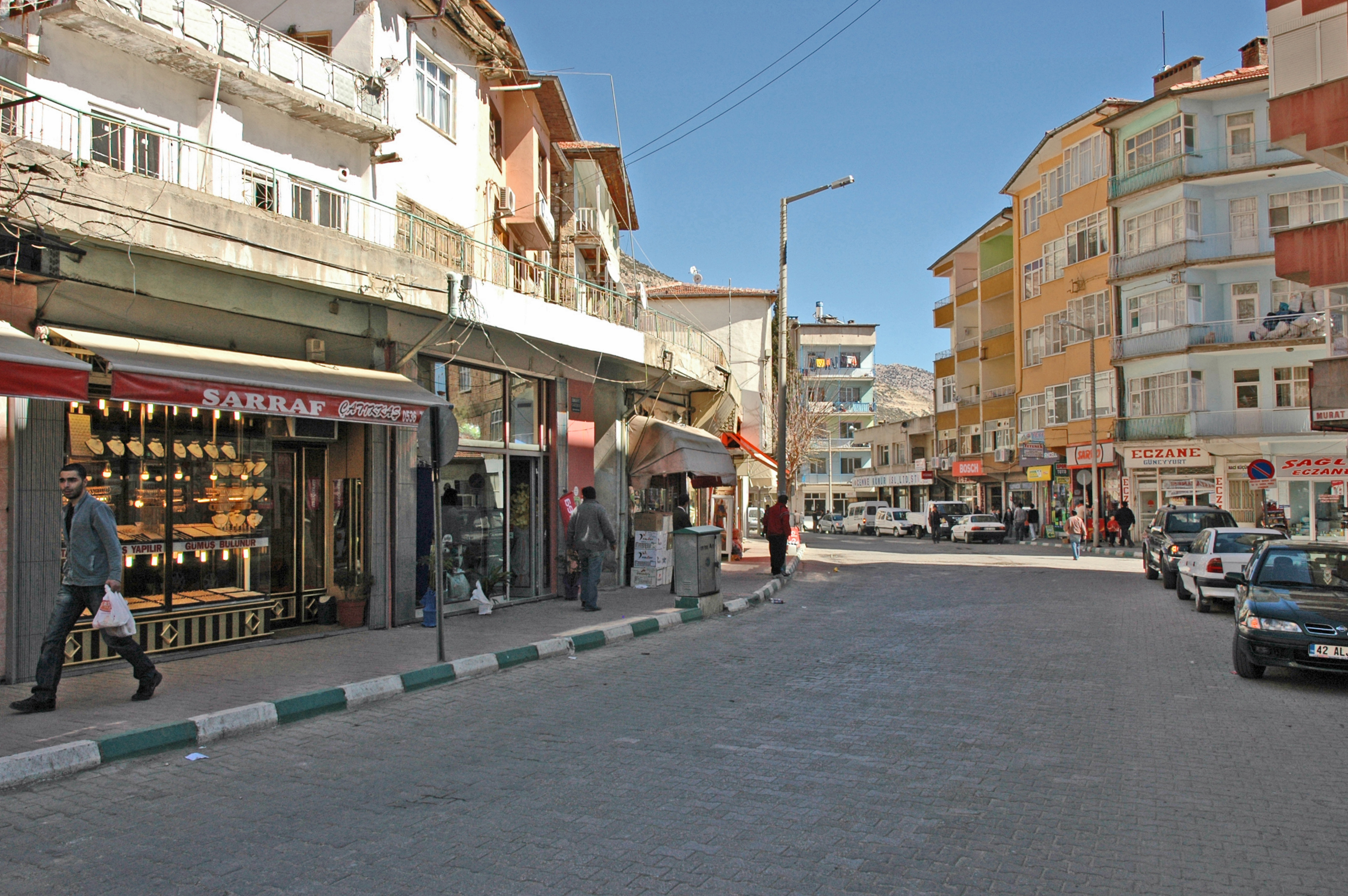
Ermenek Town view

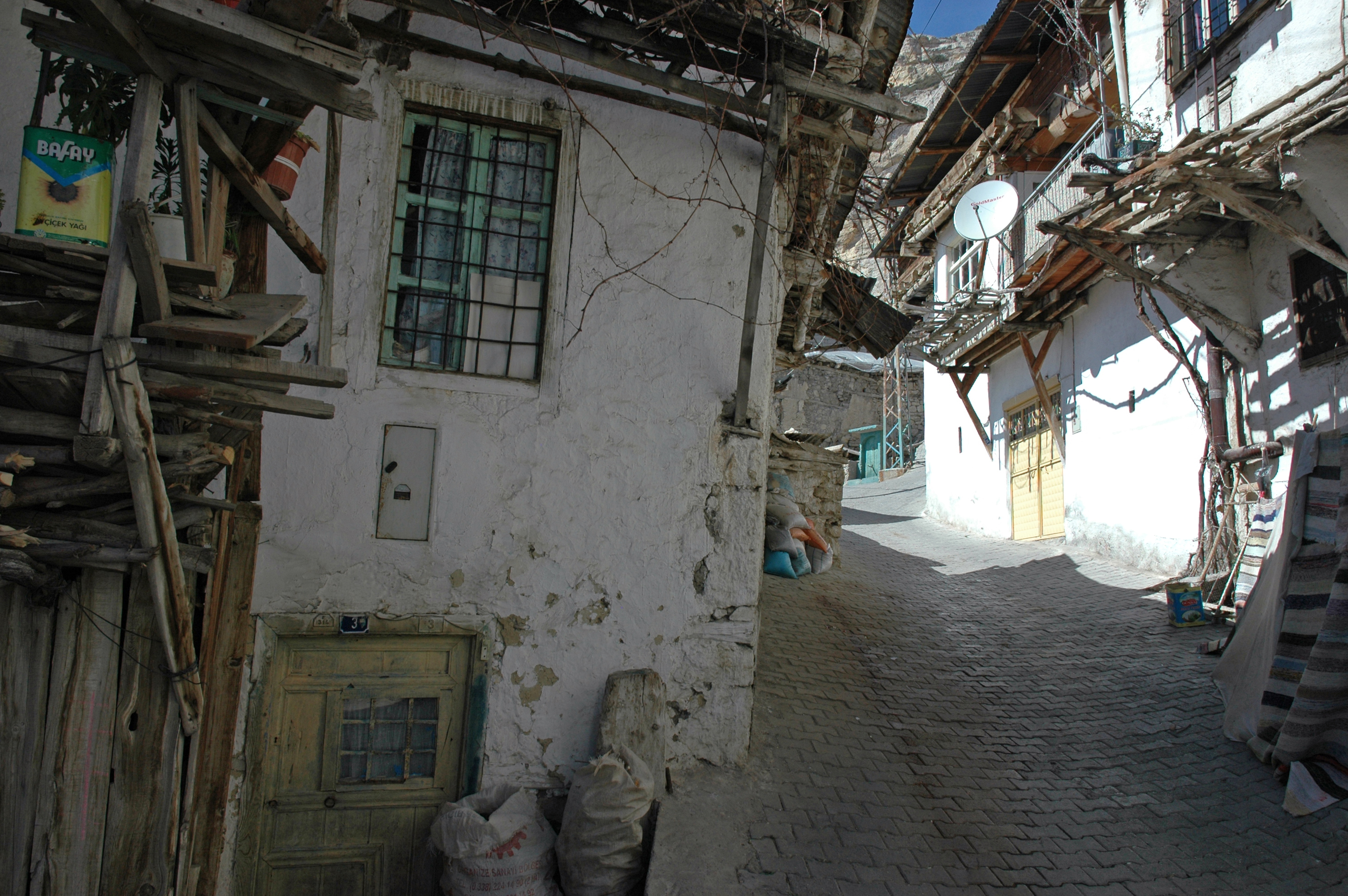
Ermenek Town view

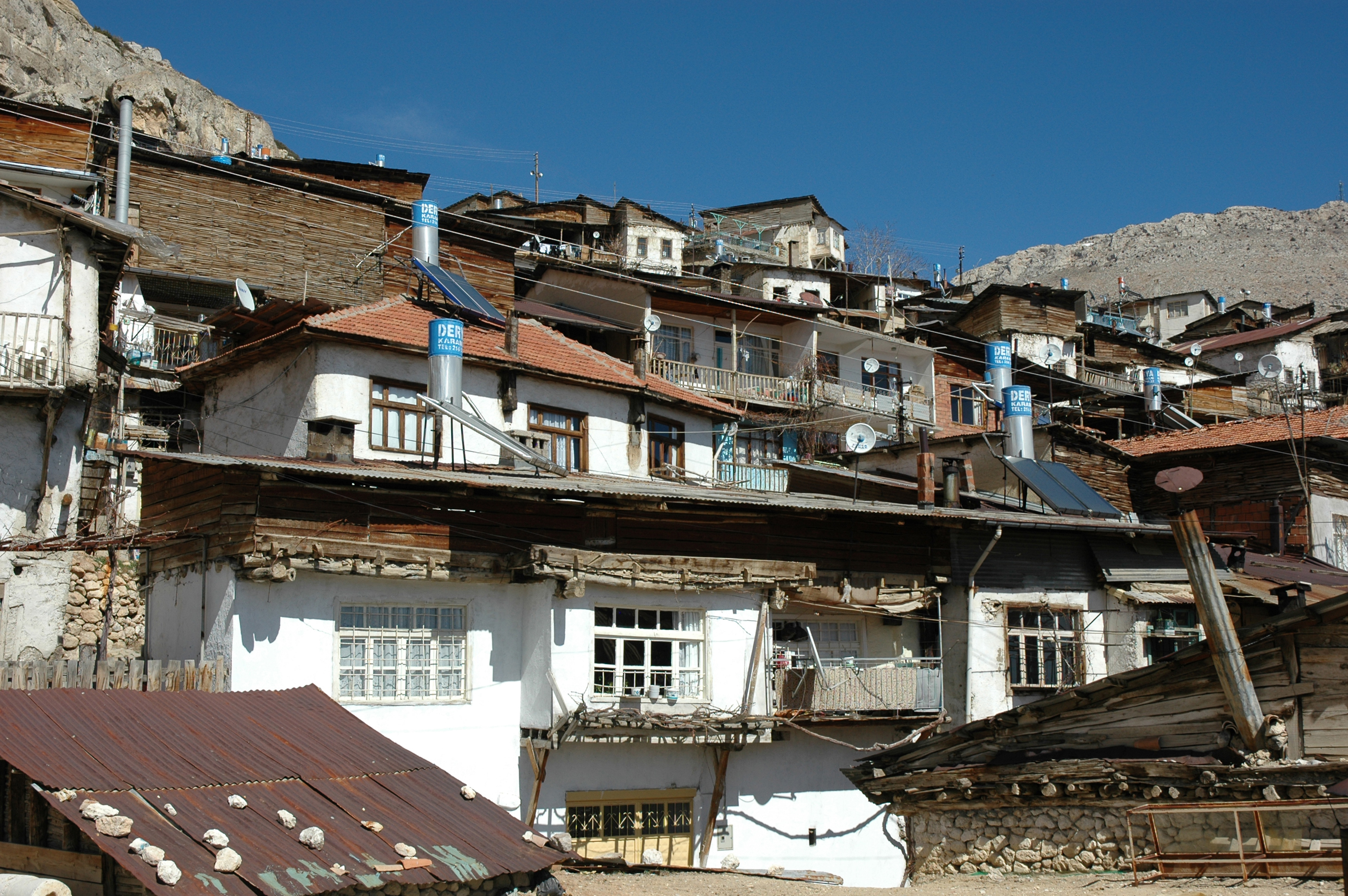
Ermenek Town view

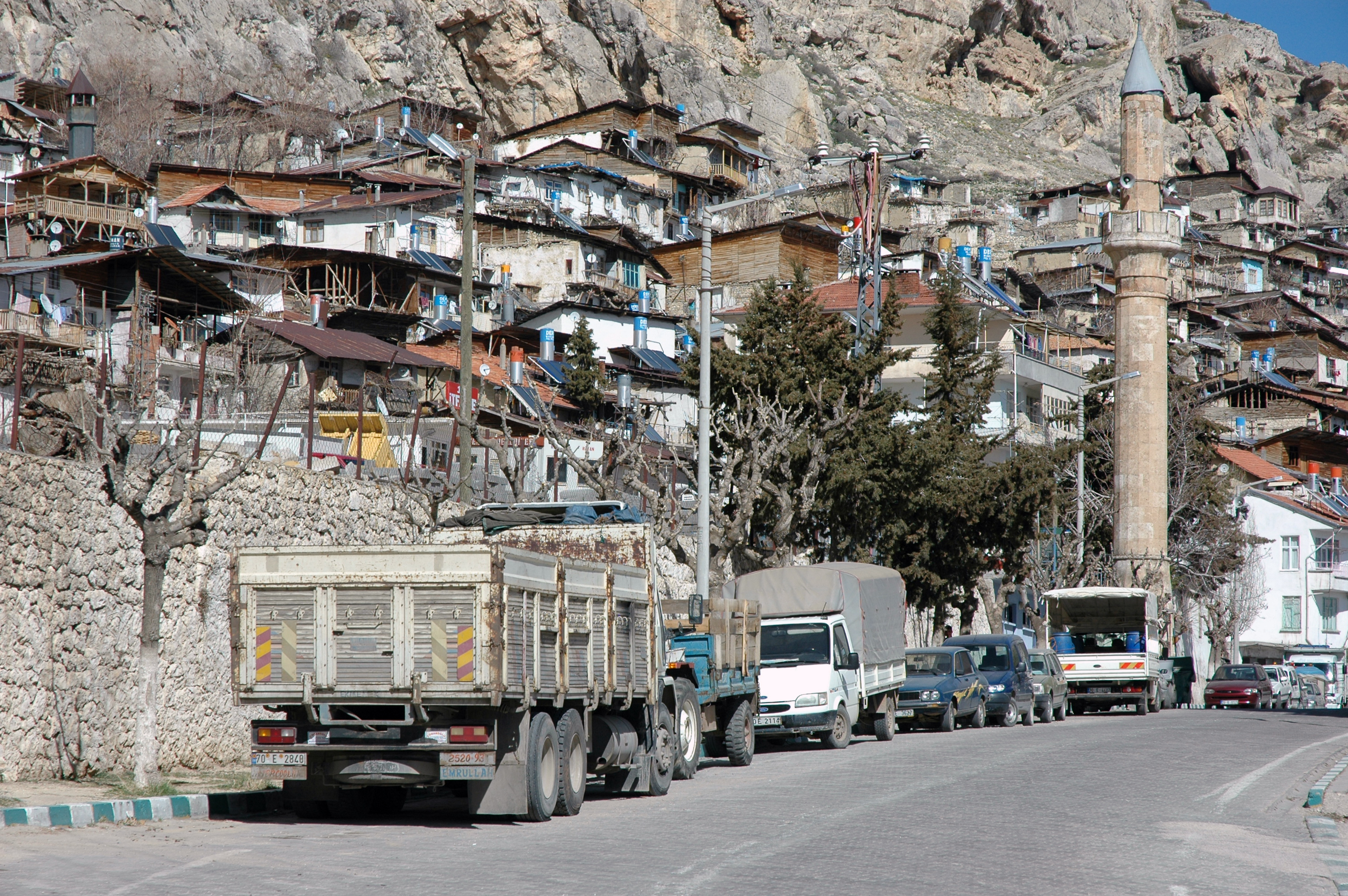
Ermenek Town view

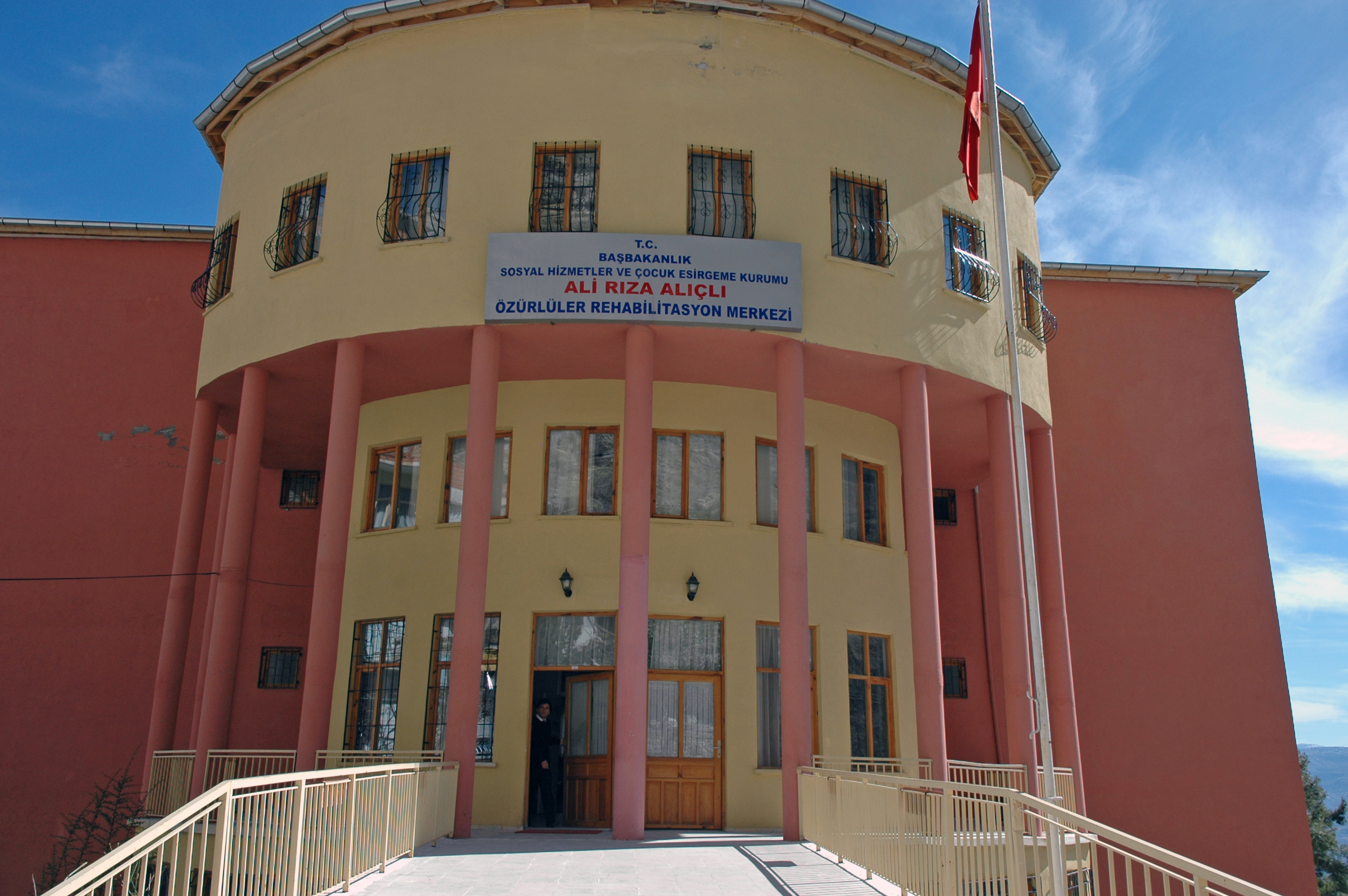
Ermenek Town view

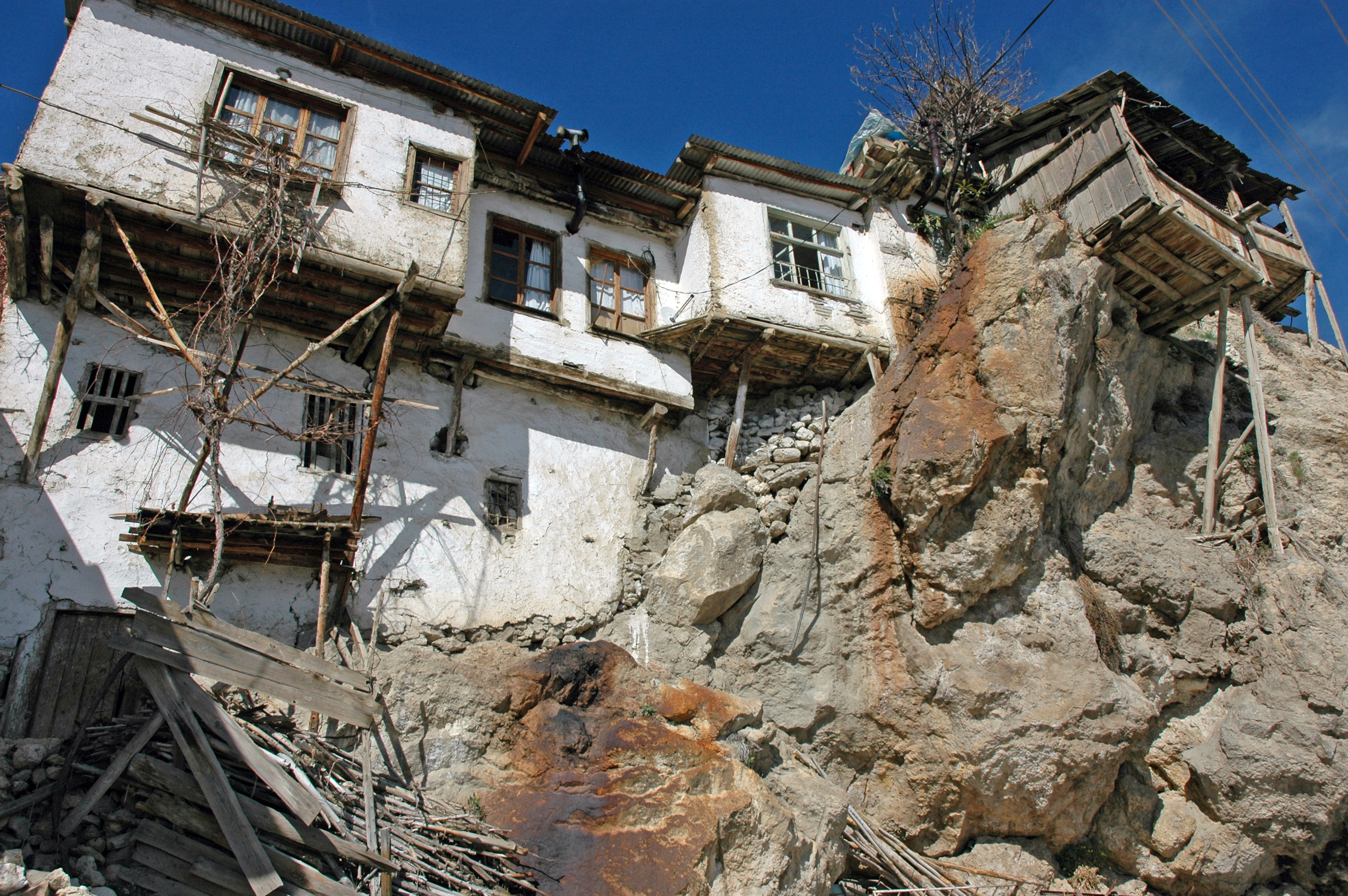
Ermenek Town view

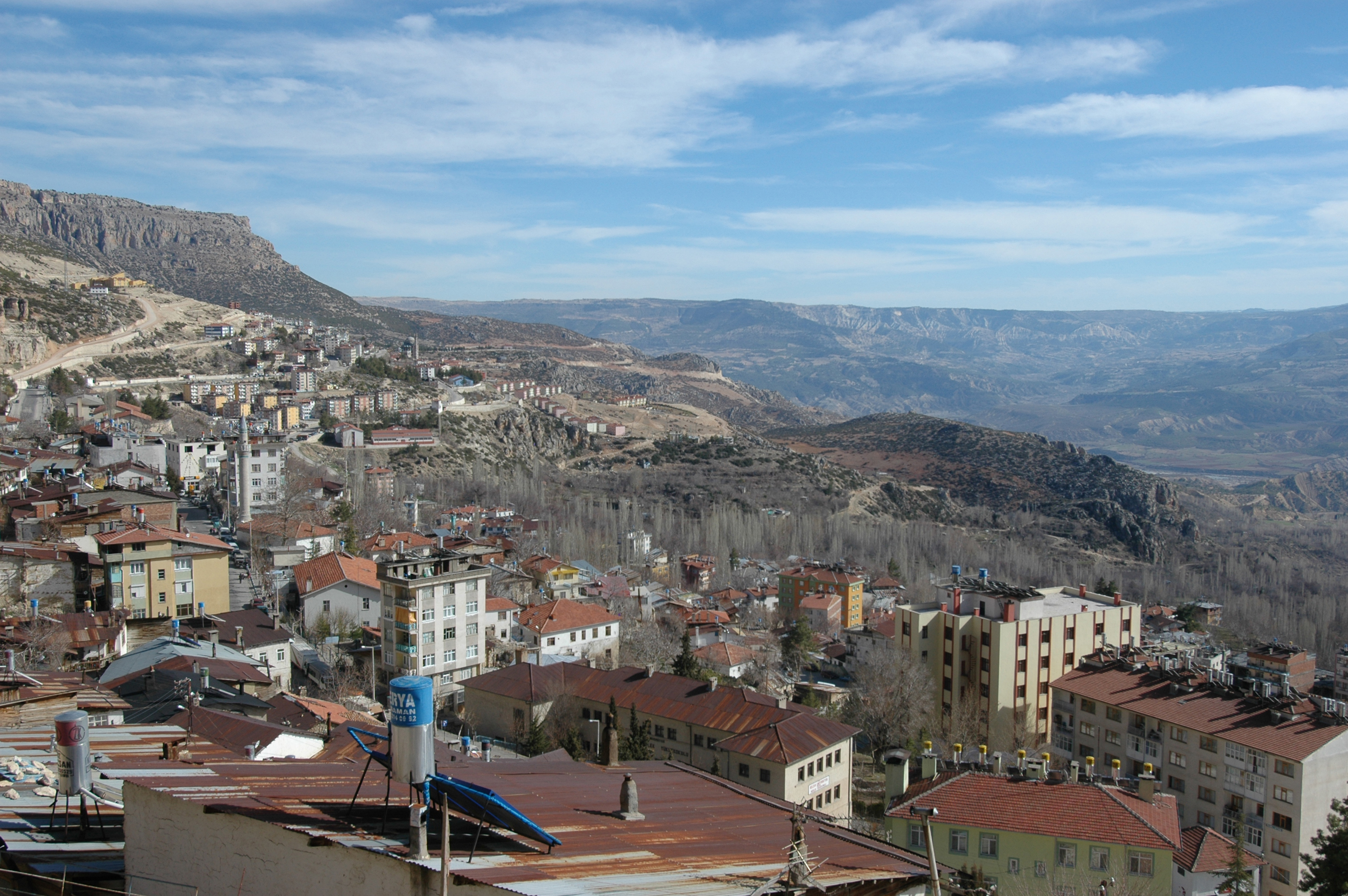
Ermenek Town view

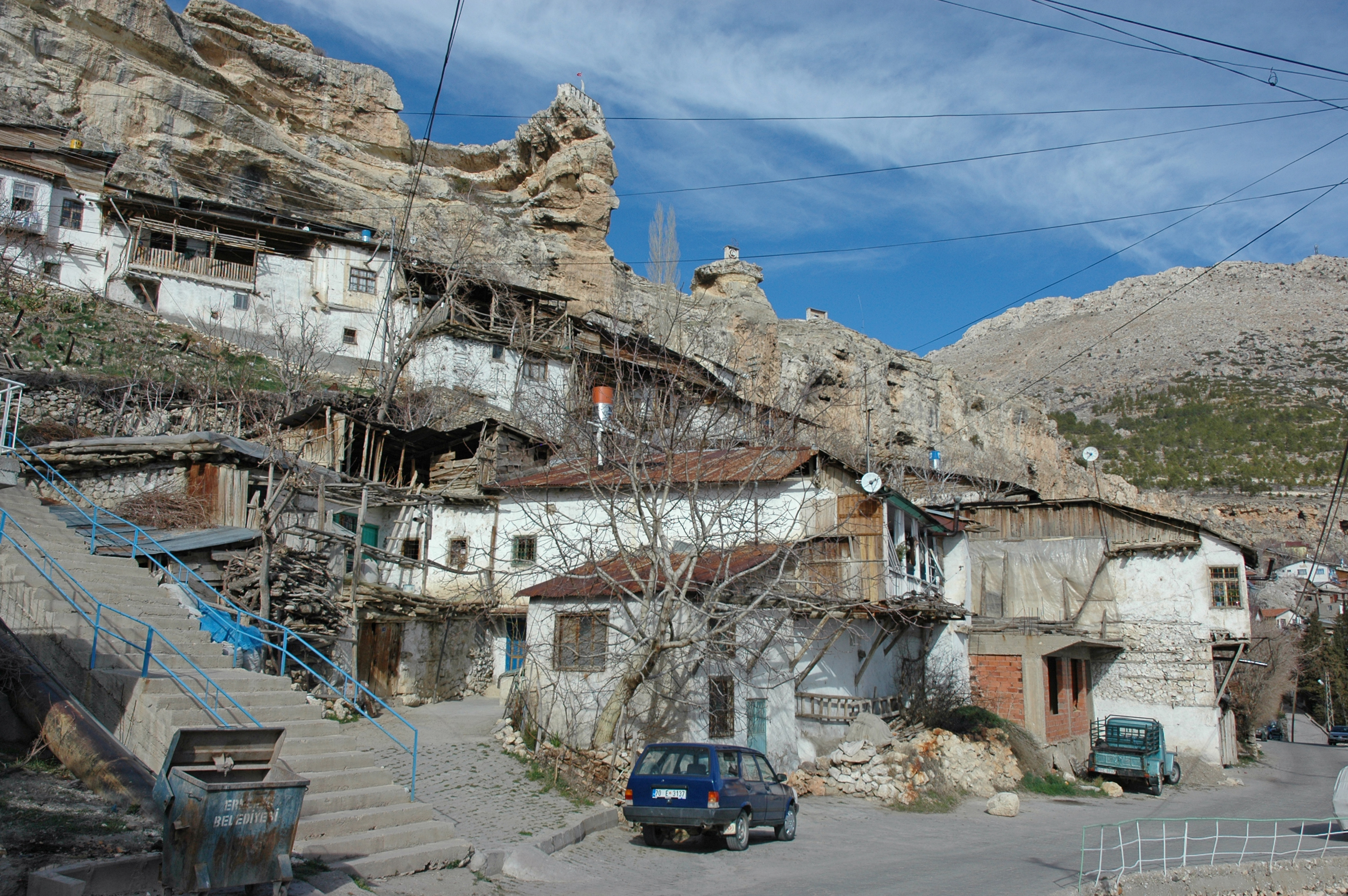
Ermenek Town view

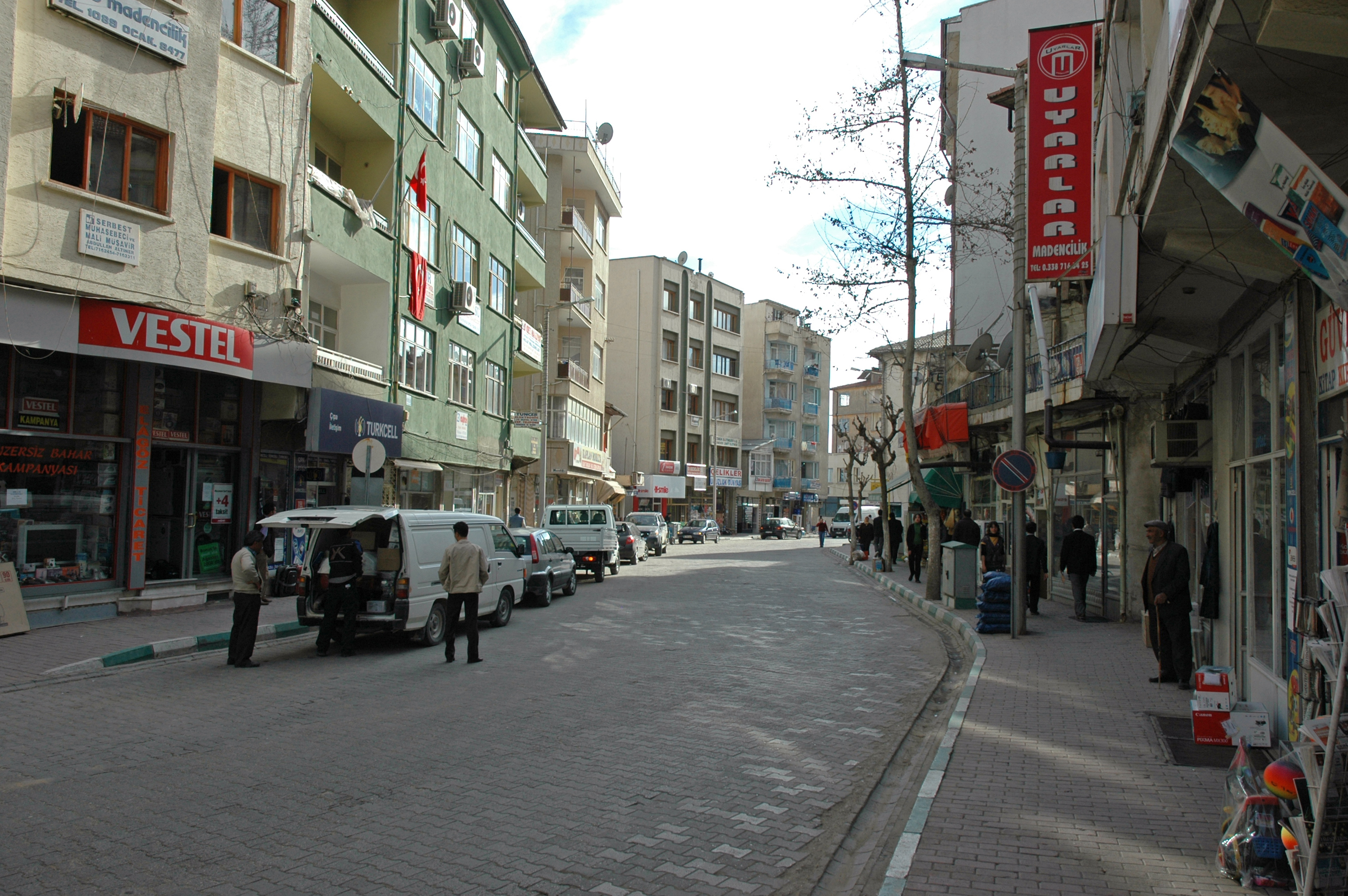
Ermenek Town view

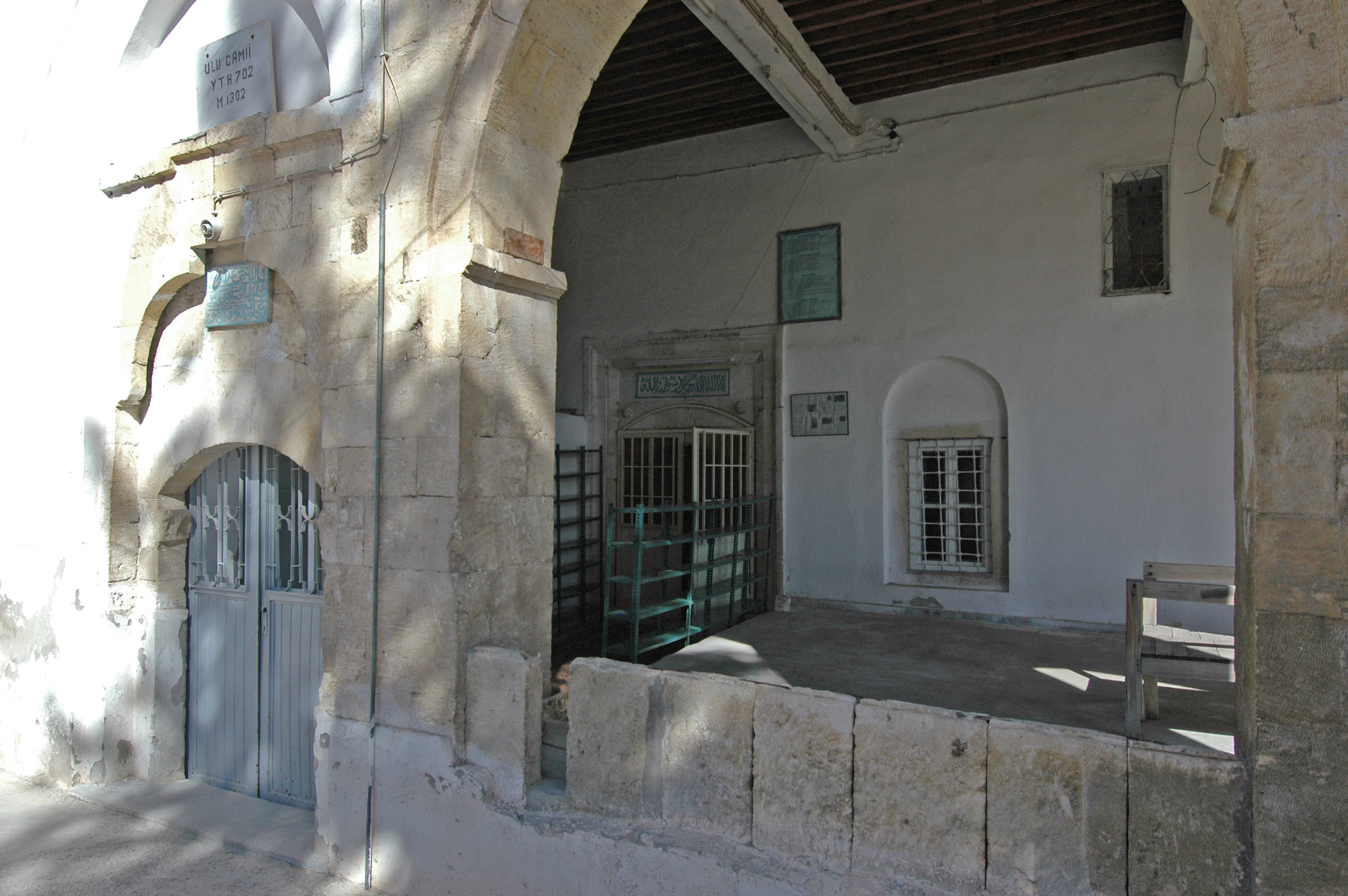
Ermenek Ulu Cami

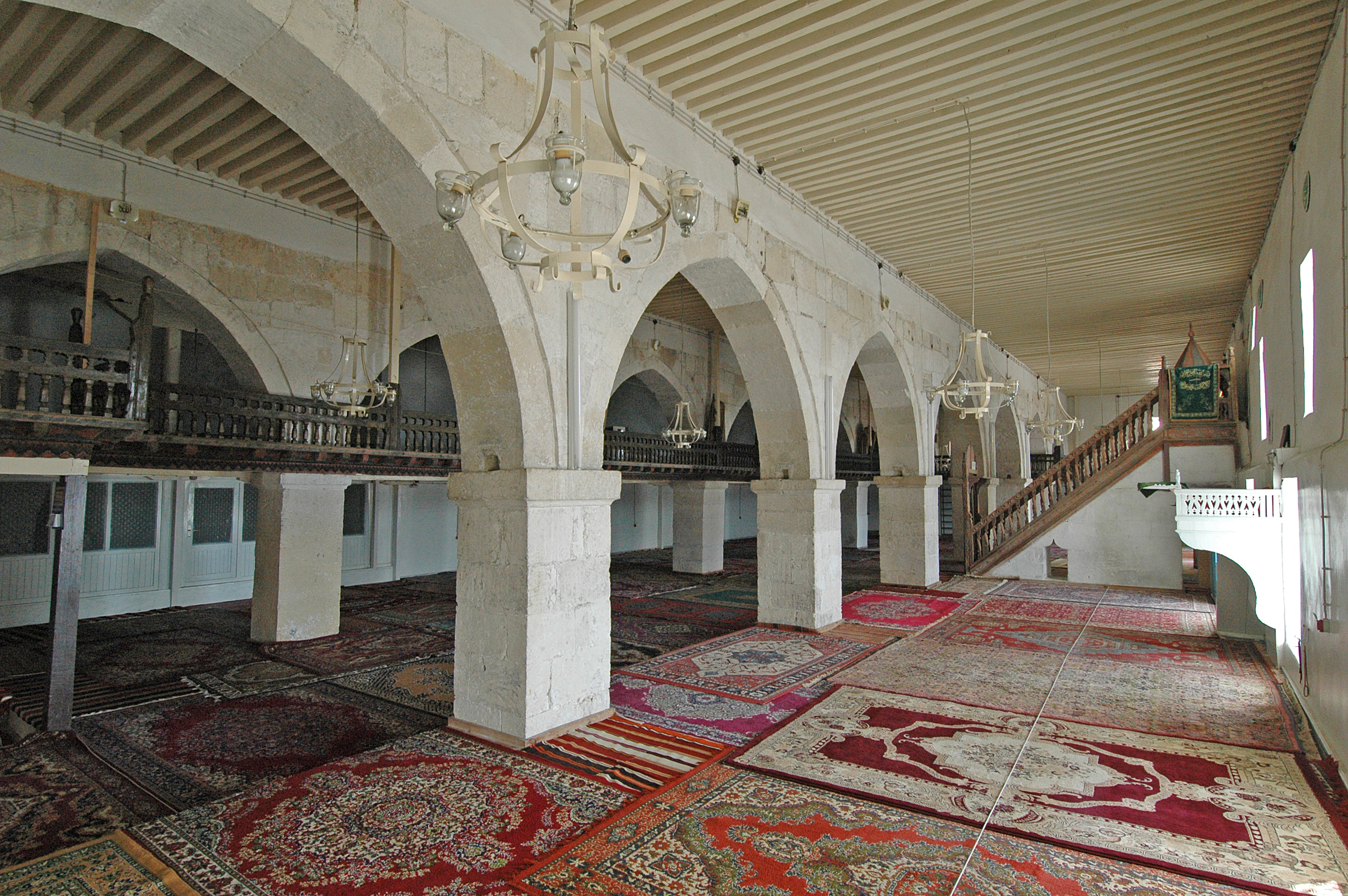
Ermenek Ulu Cami General view

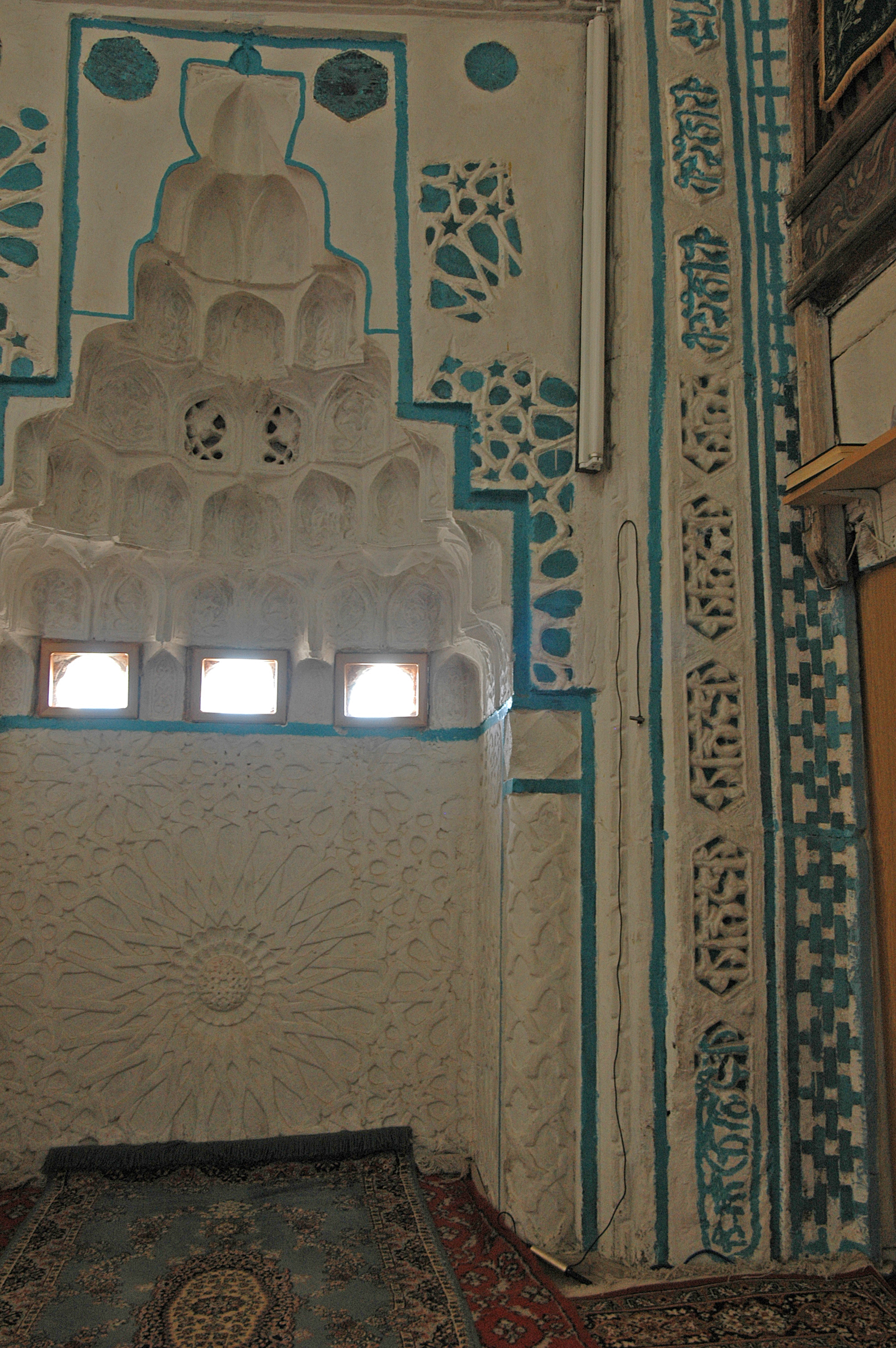
Ermenek Ulu Cami Mihrab

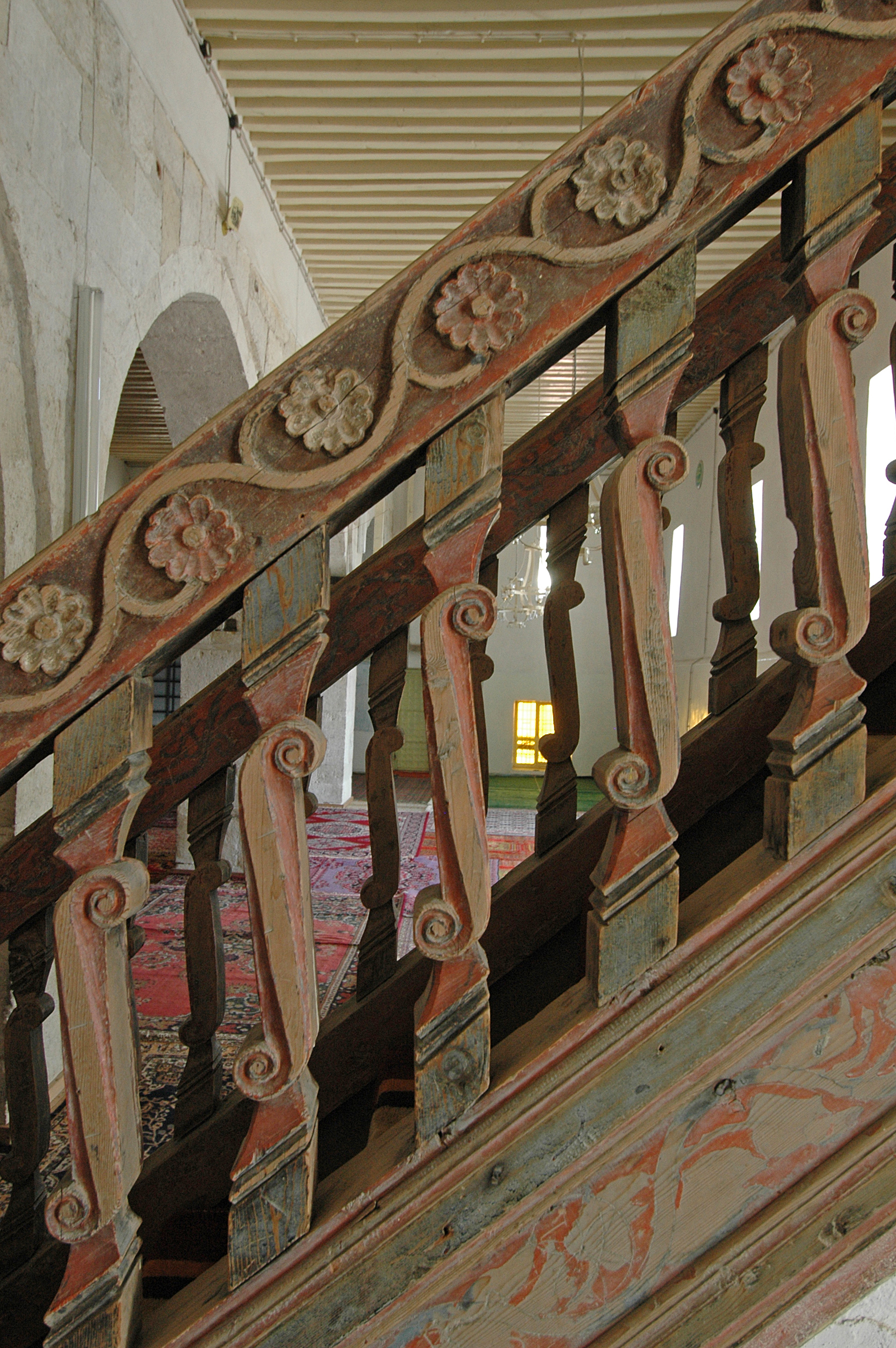
Ermenek Ulu Cami Detail of minber

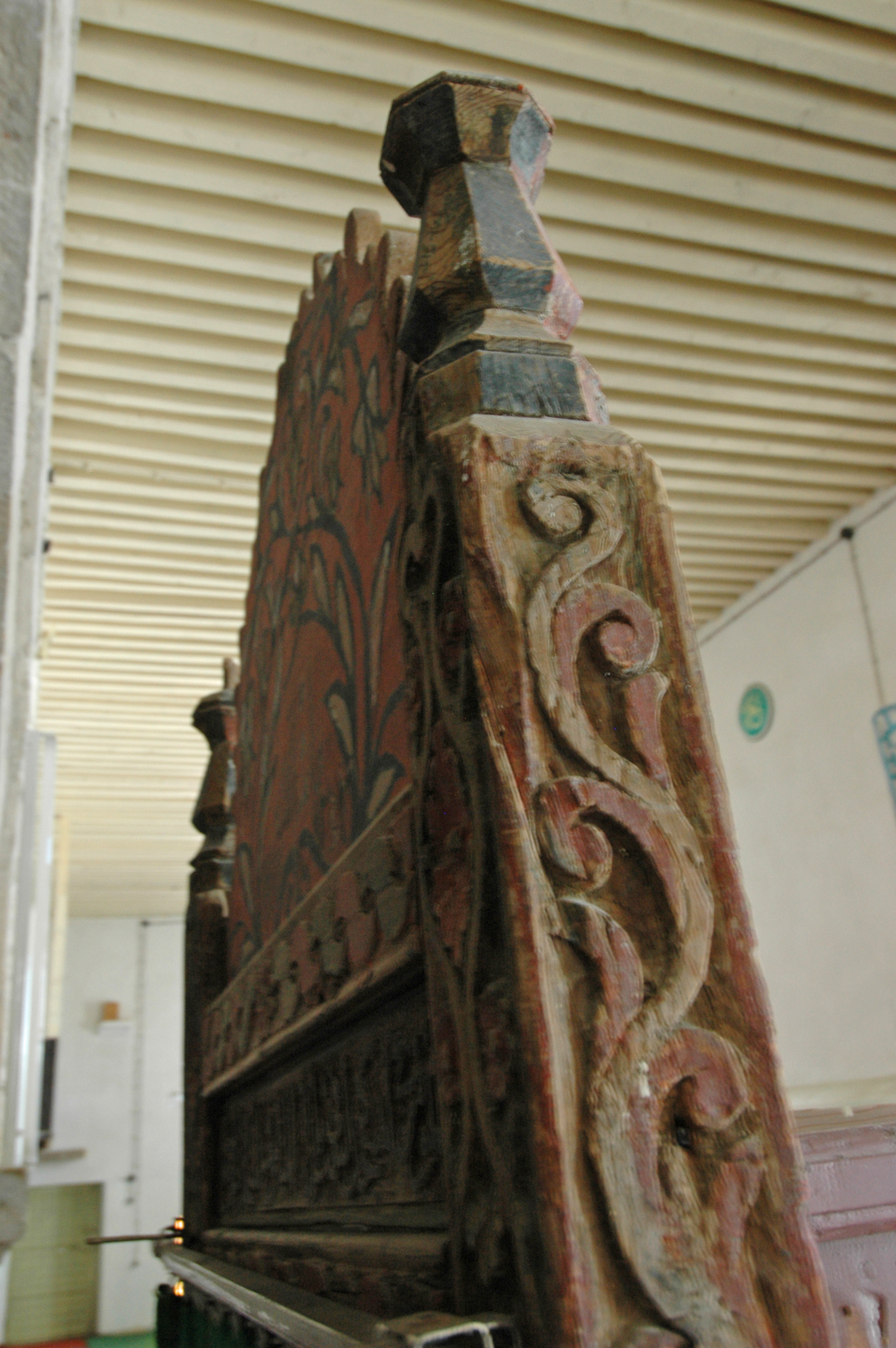
Ermenek Ulu Cami top of minber

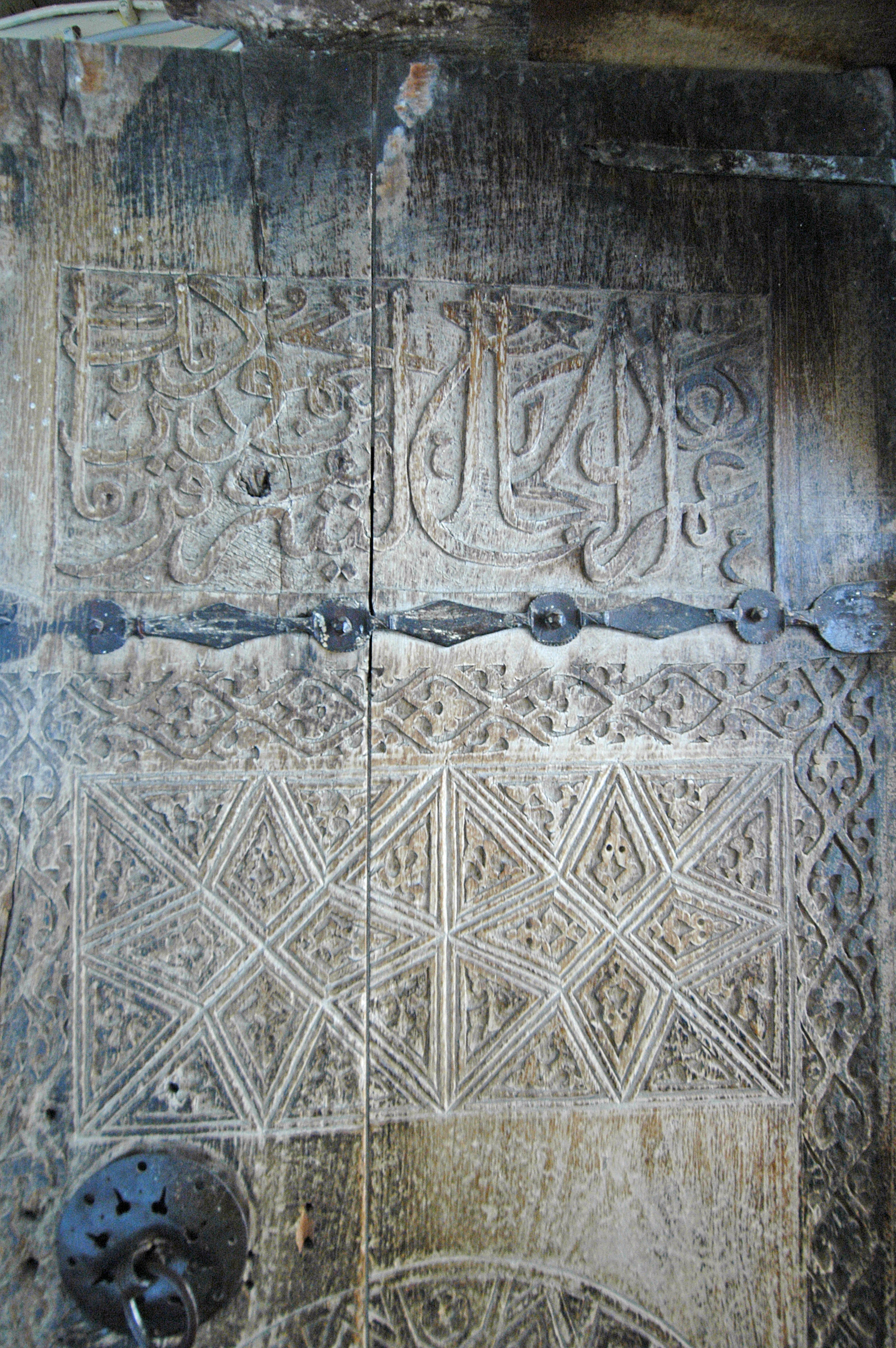
Ermenek Ulu Cami

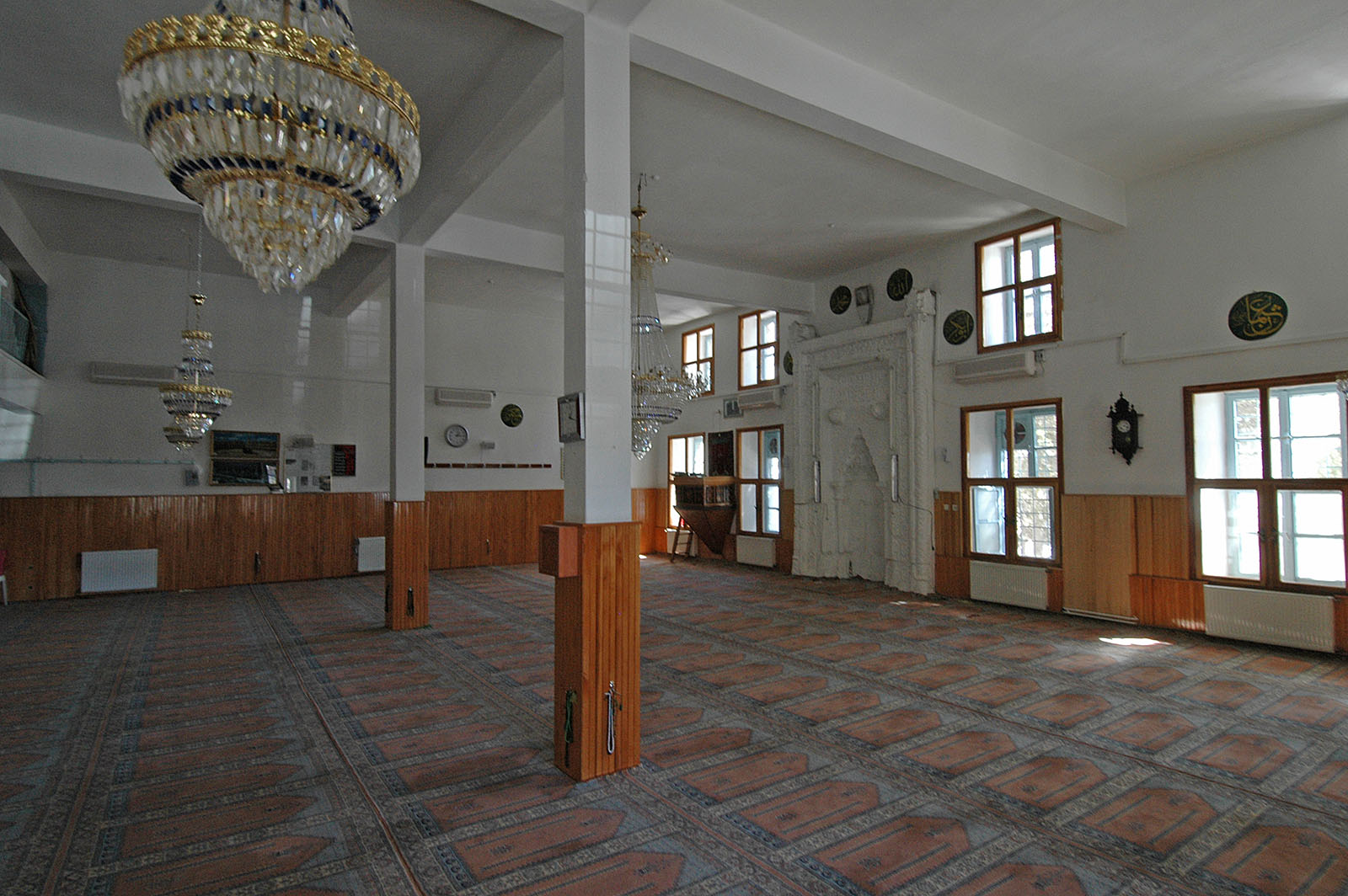
Ermenek Unknown mosque

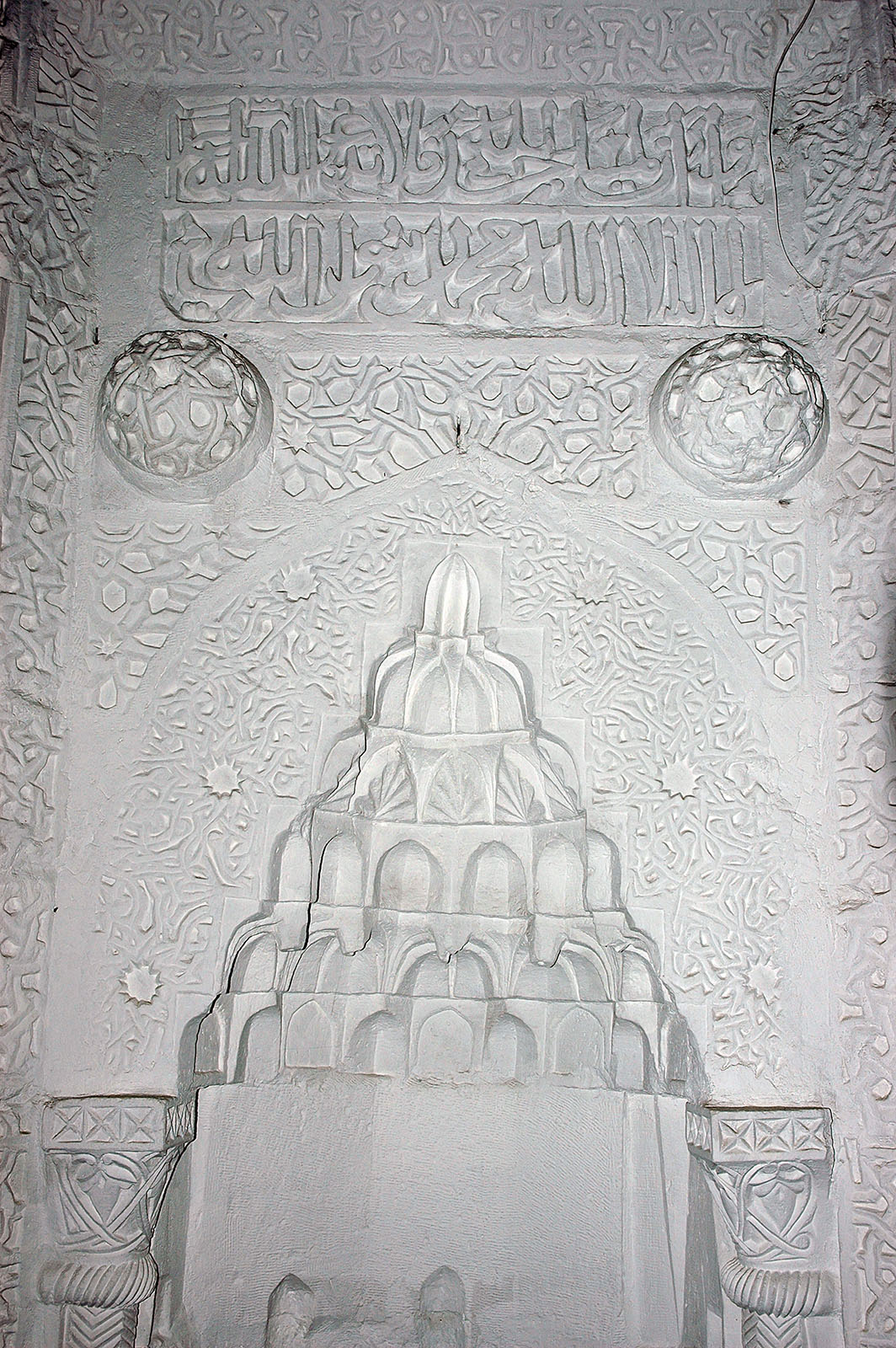
Ermenek Unknown mosque

== Sources and external links ==
- District municipality's official website (in Turkish)
- A web portal about Ermenek
- GCatholic - titular see of Germanopolis

Bibliography

- Pius Bonifacius Gams, Series episcoporum Ecclesiae Catholicae, Leipzig 1931, p. 438
- Michel Lequien, Oriens christianus in quatuor Patriarchatus digestus, Paris 1740, Vol. II, coll. 1027-1028
- Konrad Eubel, Hierarchia Catholica Medii Aevi, vol. 5, p. 209; vol. 6, pp. 224–225
- Falling Rain Genomics, Inc. "Geographical information on Ermenek, Turkey".
- Ermenek at GEOnet Names Server
- Ermenek in 120 pictures
