= List of populated places in Karaman Province =

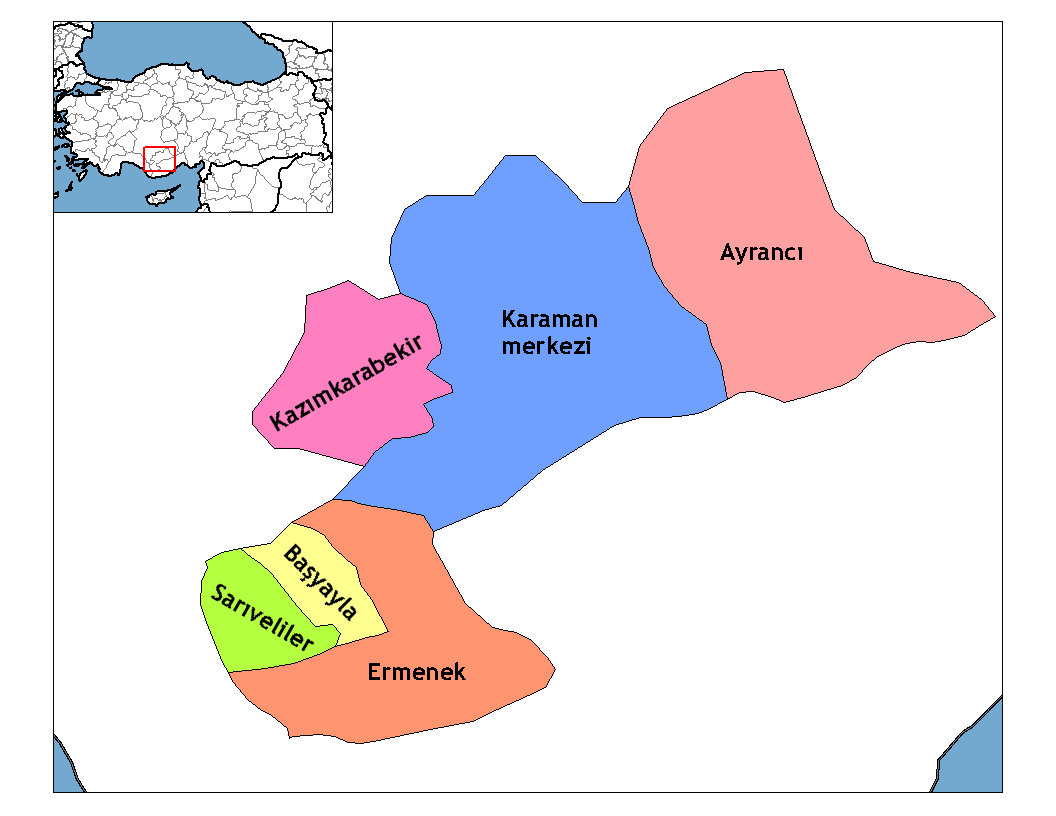
Karaman Province

Below is the list of populated places in Karaman Province, Turkey by the districts. In the following lists first place in each list is the administrative center of the district.

== Karaman ==
- Karaman
- Ada, Karaman
- Ağaçyurdu, Karaman
- Ağılönü, Karaman
- Akçaalan, Karaman
- Akçaşehir, Karaman
- Akpınar, Karaman
- Alaçatı, Karaman
- Aşağıakın, Karaman
- Aşağıkızılca, Karaman
- Aybastı, Karaman
- Bademli, Karaman
- Barutkavuran, Karaman
- Başharman, Karaman
- Başkışla, Karaman
- Bayır, Karaman
- Beydili, Karaman
- Bostanözü, Karaman
- Boyalı, Karaman
- Boyalıtepe, Karaman
- Bozkandak, Karaman
- Bölükyazı, Karaman
- Bucakkışla, Karaman
- Burhan, Karaman
- Burunoba, Karaman
- Cerit, Karaman
- Çakırbağ, Karaman
- Çatak, Karaman
- Çavuşpınarı, Karaman
- Çiğdemli, Karaman
- Çimenkuyu, Karaman
- Çoğlu, Karaman
- Çukur, Karaman
- Çukurbağ, Karaman
- Dağkonak, Karaman
- Damlapınar, Karaman
- Değirmenbaşı, Karaman
- Demiryurt, Karaman
- Dere, Karaman
- Dinek, Karaman
- Eğilmez, Karaman
- Ekinözü, Karaman
- Elmadağı, Karaman
- Eminler, Karaman
- Erenkavak, Karaman
- Göçer, Karaman
- Gökçe, Karaman
- Göztepe, Karaman
- Güçler, Karaman
- Güldere, Karaman
- Gülkaya, Karaman
- Hamidiye, Karaman
- İhsaniye, Karaman
- İslihisar, Karaman
- Kalaba, Karaman
- Karacaören, Karaman
- Kaşoba, Karaman
- Kılbasan, Karaman
- Kızık, Karaman
- Kızıllarağını, Karaman
- Kızılyaka, Karaman
- Kisecik, Karaman
- Kozlubucak, Karaman
- Kurtderesi, Karaman
- Kurucabel, Karaman
- Lale, Karaman
- Madenşehri, Karaman
- Medreselik, Karaman
- Mesudiye, Karaman
- Morcalı, Karaman
- Muratdede, Karaman
- Narlıdere, Karaman
- Ortaoba, Karaman
- Osmaniye, Karaman
- Özdemir, Karaman
- Paşabağı, Karaman
- Pınarbaşı, Karaman
- Salur, Karaman
- Sarıkaya, Karaman
- Sazlıyaka, Karaman
- Seyithasan, Karaman
- Sudurağı, Karaman
- Süleymanhacı, Karaman
- Şeyhler, Karaman
- Tarlaören, Karaman
- Taşkale, Karaman
- Tavşanlı, Karaman
- Üçbaş, Karaman
- Üçkuyu, Karaman
- Yazılı, Karaman
- Yeşildere, Karaman
- Yılangömü, Karaman
- Yollarbaşı, Karaman
- Yukarıakın, Karaman
- Yukarıkızılca, Karaman
- Yuvatepe, Karaman

== Ayrancı ==
- Ayrancı
- Ağızboğaz, Ayrancı
- Akpınar, Ayrancı
- Ambar, Ayrancı
- Berendi, Ayrancı
- Böğecik, Ayrancı
- Buğdaylı, Ayrancı
- Büyükkoraş, Ayrancı
- Çatköy, Ayrancı
- Dokuzyol, Ayrancı
- Hüyükburun, Ayrancı
- Kaleköy, Ayrancı
- Karaağaç, Ayrancı
- Kavaközü, Ayrancı
- Kavuklar, Ayrancı
- Kayaönü, Ayrancı
- Kıraman, Ayrancı
- Küçükkoraş, Ayrancı
- Melikli, Ayrancı
- Pınarkaya, Ayrancı
- Sarayköy, Ayrancı
- Üçharman, Ayrancı
- Yarıkkuyu, Ayrancı

== Başyayla ==
- Başyayla
- Bozyaka, Başyayla
- Büyükkarapınar, Başyayla
- Kışlaköy, Başyayla
- Üzümlü, Başyayla

== Ermenek ==
- Ermenek
- Ağaççatı, Ermenek
- Ardıçkaya, Ermenek
- Aşağıçağlar, Ermenek
- Balkusan, Ermenek
- Boyalık, Ermenek
- Çamlıca, Ermenek
- Çavuş, Ermenek
- Elmayurdu, Ermenek
- Eskice, Ermenek
- Evsin, Ermenek
- Gökceseki, Ermenek
- Gökçekent, Ermenek
- Görmeli, Ermenek
- Güneyyurt, Ermenek
- İkizçınar, Ermenek
- Katranlı, Ermenek
- Kayaönü, Ermenek
- Kazancı, Ermenek
- Olukpınar, Ermenek
- Pamuklu, Ermenek
- Pınarönü, Ermenek
- Sarıvadi, Ermenek
- Tepebaşı, Ermenek
- Yalındal, Ermenek
- Yaylapazarı, Ermenek
- Yerbağ, Ermenek
- Yeşilköy, Ermenek
- Yukarıçağlar, Ermenek

== Kazımkarabekir ==
- Kazımkarabekir
- Akarköy, Kazımkarabekir
- Karalgazi, Kazımkarabekir
- Kızılkuyu, Kazımkarabekir
- Mecidiye, Kazımkarabekir
- Özyurt, Kazımkarabekir
- Sinci, Kazımkarabekir

== Sarıveliler ==
- Sarıveliler
- Civandere, Sarıveliler
- Civler, Sarıveliler
- Çevrekavak, Sarıveliler
- Daran, Sarıveliler
- Dumlugöze, Sarıveliler
- Esentepe, Sarıveliler
- Göktepe, Sarıveliler
- Günder, Sarıveliler
- Işıklı, Sarıveliler
- Koçaşlı, Sarıveliler
- Uğurlu, Sarıveliler
