= Hyde (Cappadocia) =

Ancient town in the country of Turkey

Coordinates: 37°26′27″N 33°31′03″E

Hyde or Hyda was a town of ancient Cappadocia and later of Lycaonia, near the frontiers of Galatia. It became a bishopric; no longer the seat of a residential bishop, it remains, under the name Hyda in Lycaonia, a titular see of the Roman Catholic Church.

In the Hittite period, it may have been Uda.

Its site is tentatively located near Akçaşehir, Karaman Province, Turkey.
