= Pyrgoi (Lycaonia) =

Town of ancient Lycaonia

Coordinates: 37°13′40″N 32°57′26″E

Pyrgoi was a town of ancient Lycaonia, inhabited in Byzantine times.

Its site is located near Kazımkarabekir, Asiatic Turkey.
