= Dere, Karaman =

Dere
- Village
- Location within Turkey Location within Turkey Central Anatolia
- Coordinates: 37°08′N 33°16′E
- Country: Turkey
- Province: Karaman
- District: Karaman
- Elevation: 1,100 m (3,600 ft)
- Population (2022): 1,173
- Time zone: UTC+3 (TRT)
- Postal code: 70000
- Area code: 0338

Dere (formerly Fisandın, also called Dereköy) is a village in the Karaman District of Karaman Province, Turkey. Its population is 1,173 (2022). It is situated to the south of Karaman and to the north of Gödet Dam reservoir. It is on the creek between Karaman and the dam and is named after the Turkish word for creek, Dere. Its distance to Karaman is 7 kilometres (4.3 mi).
