= Ilistra =

Ancient city in Lycaonia

Coordinates: 37°11′53″N 33°01′38″E

Ilistra (Ancient Greek: Ἴλιστρα) was a town of ancient Lycaonia, inhabited in Roman and Byzantine times. It was on the road from Laranda to Isaura, which is still in existence. Ilistra became a seat of a bishop; no longer a residential bishopric, it remains a titular see of the Roman Catholic Church.

Its site is located near Yollarbaşı, Karaman Province, Turkey.
