= Ağılönü =

Ağılönü (literally "animal pen-front") is a Turkish place name that may refer to the following places in Turkey:

- Ağılönü, Amasya, a village in Amasya district, Amasya Province
- Ağılönü, Karaman, a village the central district (Karaman), Karaman Province
