= Posala =

Town of ancient Lycaonia

Coordinates: 37°15′05″N 32°52′39″E

Posala was a town of ancient Lycaonia, inhabited in Byzantine times.

Its site is located near Özyurt, Kazımkarabekir, Asiatic Turkey.
