= Bıçakçı =

Bıçakçı can refer to:

- Bıçakçı Bridge
- Bıçakçı, Alanya
- Bıçakçı, Batman
- Bıçakçı, Çameli
