= Çakırbağ (disambiguation) =

Çakırbağ can refer to:

- Çakırbağ
- Çakırbağ, Bayramören
- Çakırbağ, Kale
