= Eminler, Karaman =

Eminler
- Village
- Location within Turkey Location within Turkey Central Anatolia
- Coordinates: 37°20′N 33°06′E
- Country: Turkey
- Province: Karaman
- District: Karaman
- Elevation: 1,020 m (3,350 ft)
- Population (2022): 136
- Time zone: UTC+3 (TRT)
- Postal code: 70000
- Area code: 0338

Eminler is a village in the Karaman District of Karaman Province, Turkey. Its population is 136 (2022). It is situated to the west of Karadağ, an extinct volcano. Its distance to Karaman is 22 kilometres (14 mi). A tumulus in the village indicate that the village was an ancient settlement which was abandoned. The present village was founded by Circassians from the Caucasus after the ethnic cleansing of Circassians by the Russian Empire in the second half of the 19th century. The main economic activities of the village are agriculture and animal breeding. Main crops are cereals.
