= Bıçakçı Bridge =

Bıçakçı Bridge Bıçakçı Köprüsü
- Coordinates: 36.9473°N 33.0390°E
- Crosses: Göksu
- Owner: General Directorate of Highways of the Ministry of Transport, Maritime and Communication
- Heritage status: Karamanids

Characteristics
- Material: Stone
- Total length: 81.60 m (267.7 ft)
- Longest span: 20 m (66 ft)

History
- Construction end: 14th century

Bıçakçı Bridge (literally "Cutter's Bridge") is a historic deck arch bridge in Karaman Province, southwestern Turkey. It is on the road Bucakkışla - Ermenek, and spans over the Göksu River at 36°56′52″N 39°22′23″E.

The length of the asymmetric stone deck arch bridge is 81.60 m (267.7 ft). Its width is 5.1 metres (17 ft) It consists of a 20 m (66 ft)-long main arch flanked by two minor arches. There are also four auxiliary flood openings two in each side. The exact construction date is unknown. Judging from the masonry, it is assumed that the bridge was built in the 14th century when the area around the bridge was under the rule of Karamanids.

== Legend ==
According to a legend, the bridge was commissioned by a very wealthy woman. At the end of the construction, the architect was paid. After the payment was made, the architect wanted to buy a decorated dagger hung on the wall. The woman agreed to give the knife as a present to the architect, and the architect returned all the money on the condition that the money would be spend for the poor. That is why the bridge is known as Bıçakçı ("the cutter").
