= Eğilmez, Karaman =

Eğilmez
- Village
- Location within Turkey Location within Turkey Central Anatolia
- Coordinates: 37°32′N 33°10′E
- Country: Turkey
- Province: Karaman
- District: Karaman
- Elevation: 1,020 m (3,350 ft)
- Population (2022): 294
- Time zone: UTC+3 (TRT)
- Postal code: 70000
- Area code: 0338

Eğilmez is a village in the Karaman District of Karaman Province, Turkey. Its population is 294 (2022). It is situated to the north of Karadağ an, extinct volcano. Its distance to Karaman is 46 kilometres (29 mi). The village was founded by Turkmens. The main economic activity of the village is agriculture.
