= Başkışla, Karaman =

Başkışla
- Village
- Location in Turkey Başkışla (Turkey Central Anatolia)
- Coordinates: 37°06′43″N 32°57′41″E
- Country: Turkey
- Province: Karaman
- District: Karaman
- Elevation: 1,420 m (4,660 ft)
- Population (2022): 312
- Time zone: UTC+3 (TRT)
- Area code: 0338

Başkışla is a village in Karaman District of Karaman Province, Turkey. Its population is 312 (2022). Its altitude is 1,420 metres (4,660 ft). Its distance to Karaman is 30 kilometres (19 mi).

The village was founded in the 16th century as a Turkmen village. During the winters the village was used as the winter quarters for the travellers between Karaman and the mountain villages. In Turkish such places were called kışlak and the village was named Başkışlak. Later the last -k was dropped and the present name of the village is Başkışla.

Agriculture and animal husbandry are the chief sources of income in the village. Barley wheat and chickpea are main crops. Viticulture, poultry and sheep breeding are other economic activities.
