= Ayrancı =

- Municipality
- Location in Turkey Ayrancı (Turkey Central Anatolia)
- Coordinates: 37°21′43″N 33°41′01″E
- Country: Turkey
- Province: Karaman
- District: Ayrancı

Government
  - Mayor: Yüksel Büyükkarcı (MHP)
- Elevation: 1,132 m (3,714 ft)
- Population (2022): 2,292
- Time zone: UTC+3 (TRT)
- Area code: 0338
- Website: www.ayranci.bel.tr

Ayrancı is a town in Karaman Province in the Central Anatolia region of Turkey. It is the seat of Ayrancı District. Its population is 2,292 (2022). Its elevation is 1,132 m (3,714 ft).

== History ==
The town of Ayrancı was among the numerous locations that imperial Ottoman and republican Turkish governments settled the incoming Crimean Tatars who were forced out of their homeland by the Russian Empire in late 19th and early 20th century. The town remained as a predominantly Crimean Tatar settlement in Central Anatolia until recently. The town was a part of Konya Province but became a part of Karaman with the creation of the Karaman Province.
