= Yukarıakın, Karaman =

Yukarıakın
- Village
- Location within Turkey Location within Turkey Central Anatolia
- Coordinates: 36°53′N 33°01′E
- Country: Turkey
- Province: Karaman
- District: Karaman
- Elevation: 1,370 m (4,490 ft)
- Population (2022): 106
- Time zone: UTC+3 (TRT)
- Postal code: 70000
- Area code: 0338

Yukarıakın is a village in the Karaman District of Karaman Province, Turkey. Its population is 106 (2022). It is situated in the Taurus Mountains. Its distance to Karaman is 59 kilometres (37 mi). According to page of Karaman news, the founders of the village were the members of a tribe named Ağaçeri and were Akıncı (irregular cavalry in the early years of the Ottoman Empire) . The original name of the village was Akın. But in the second half of the 19th century the village was split into two parts. Yukarıakın (literally "upper Akın") is the name of the western part. The main economic activity of Yukarıakın is agriculture.
