= Dinek, Karaman =

Dinek
- Village
- Location within Turkey Location within Turkey Central Anatolia
- Coordinates: 37°23′N 33°15′E
- Country: Turkey
- Province: Karaman
- District: Karaman
- Elevation: 1,010 m (3,310 ft)
- Population (2022): 177
- Time zone: UTC+3 (TRT)
- Postal code: 70000
- Area code: 0338

Dinek is a village in the Karaman District of Karaman Province, Turkey. Its population is 177 (2022). It is situated to the east of Karadağ, an extinct volcano. Its distance to Karaman is 27 kilometres (17 mi). In the history (beginning by Hittites) there had been several settlements around Dinek. In the village there are three tumuli officially declared as SIT (Archaeological site). But the present village was founded in the 19th century by Yörüks (once nomadic Turkmens). The name of the village is a common name of villages founded by Yörüks. Main economic activity of the village is agriculture. But because of the irrigation water shortage the production is limited. Animal breeding is a secondary activity.
