= Kılbasan =

Settlement in Turkey

- Village
- Location within Turkey Location within Turkey Central Anatolia
- Coordinates: 37°19′N 33°11′E
- Country: Turkey
- Province: Karaman
- District: Karaman
- Elevation: 1,010 m (3,310 ft)
- Population (2022): 1,571
- Time zone: UTC+3 (TRT)
- Postal code: 70120
- Area code: 0338

Kılbasan is a village in Karaman District, Karaman Province, Turkey. Its population is 1,571 (2022). Before the 2013 reorganisation, it was a town (belde).

== Geography ==
Kılbasan is at the north of Karaman and the highway distance to Karaman is 17 km (11 mi). The town is in the even plain with an altitude of 1,010 m (3,310 ft). The extinct volcano Karadağ (2271 m.) is at the north west of the town.

== History ==
During Byzantine Empire era, the main settlement was in Karışmaa Birindi, an ancient town on a tumulus few kilometers south west of Kılbasan. Kılbasan and vicinity had been a part of Seljuk Empire in the second half of the 11th century. After Mongol domination, the area became a part of Karamanid beylik (principality). In 1467 the area was incorporated into the rising Ottoman Empire. The earliest settler of the town is probably a Turkmen nomad from north (Kastamonu region) whose title deed is still in the main mosque of Kılbasan. In 1967, Kılbasan was declared a township.

== Economy ==
Like most other Central Anatolian towns, the main activity is agriculture. The most pronounced crop is wheat. Animal husbandry is another economic activity. In fact, the town is named after skin sack used in cheese production. Beginning by the 1970s, many Kılbasan residents moved to West Europe (especially Netherlands) to work as industrial workers (Gastarbeider). So the de jure population of the town is more than the figure cited above.
