= Beydili, Karaman =

Beydili
- Village
- Location within Turkey Location within Turkey Central Anatolia
- Coordinates: 37°21′5″N 33°19′1″E
- Country: Turkey
- Province: Karaman
- District: Karaman
- Elevation: 1,010 m (3,310 ft)
- Population (2022): 182
- Time zone: UTC+3 (TRT)
- Postal code: 70000
- Area code: 0338

Beydili is a village in Karaman District of Karaman Province, Turkey. Its population is 182 (2022). Its distance to Karaman is 21 kilometres (13 mi). The name Beydili refers to a Turkmen tribe with the same name. Although initially they were nomadic, they were settled by the Ottoman government. The first written document about the Beydili village was dated 1845.

Main economic activity is agriculture and animal husbandry.
