= Başyayla =

- Municipality
- Location in Turkey Başyayla (Turkey Central Anatolia)
- Coordinates: 36°45′17″N 32°40′44″E
- Country: Turkey
- Province: Karaman
- District: Başyayla

Government
  - Mayor: Ahmet İpek (AKP)
- Elevation: 1,370 m (4,490 ft)
- Population (2022): 1,895
- Time zone: UTC+3 (TRT)
- Area code: 0338
- Website: www.basyayla.bel.tr

Başyayla is a town in Karaman Province in the Central Anatolia region of Turkey. It is the seat of Başyayla District. Its population is 1,895 (2022).
