= Ağaçyurdu, Karaman =

Ağaçyurdu
- Village
- Location within Turkey Location within Turkey Central Anatolia
- Coordinates: 36°59′N 33°14′E
- Country: Turkey
- Province: Karaman
- District: Karaman
- Elevation: 1,410 m (4,630 ft)
- Population (2022): 100
- Time zone: UTC+3 (TRT)
- Postal code: 70000
- Area code: 0338

Ağaçyurdu is a village the Karaman District of Karaman Province, Turkey., with a population of 100 in 2022. It is situated to the east of Turkish state highway D.715, with a distance of 28 kilometres (17 mi) to Karaman. The major economic activity of the village is agriculture, its main crops being citrus and apple, with dairying as a secondary activity.
