= Akçaalan, Karaman =

Akçaalan
- Village
- Location within Turkey Location within Turkey Central Anatolia
- Coordinates: 36°57′N 32°53′E
- Country: Turkey
- Province: Karaman
- District: Karaman
- Elevation: 1,070 m (3,510 ft)
- Population (2022): 187
- Time zone: UTC+3 (TRT)
- Postal code: 70110
- Area code: 0338

Akçaalan is a village the Karaman District of Karaman Province, Turkey. Its population is 187 (2022). It is situated in the Taurus Mountains. Its distance to Karaman is 78 kilometres (48 mi). Major economic activities of the village are agriculture and animal breeding.
