= Kazımkarabekir District =

District of Karaman Province, Turkey

- District
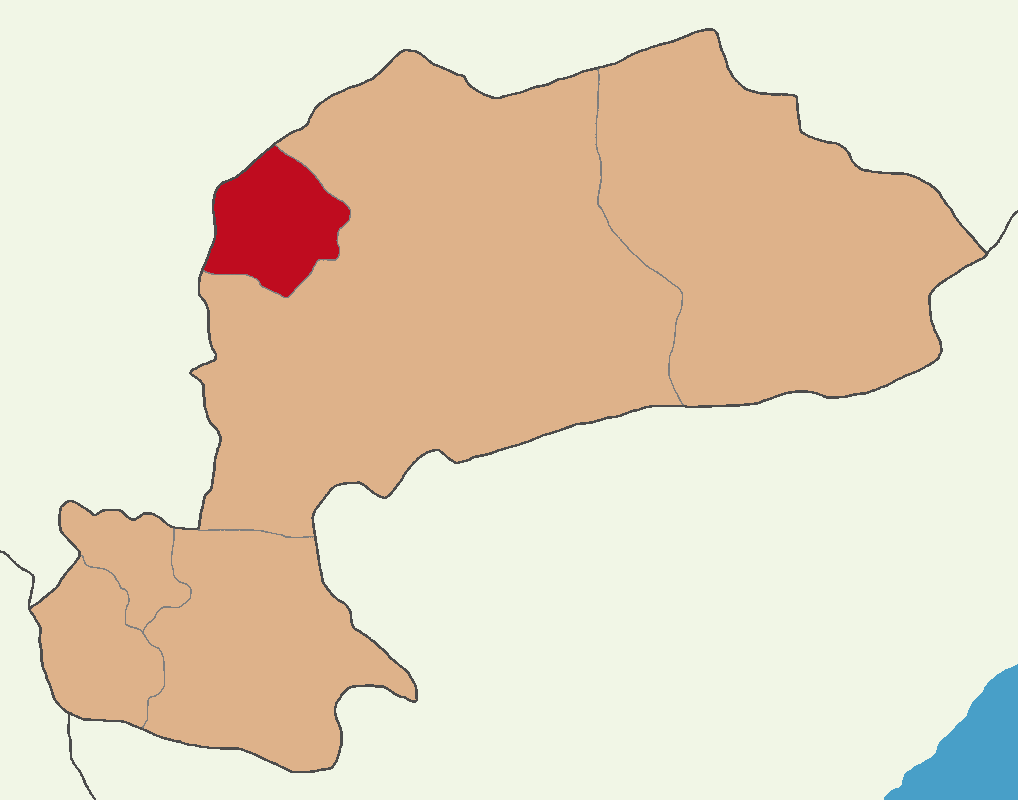
- Map showing Kazımkarabekir District in Karaman Province

- Location in Turkey Kazımkarabekir District (Turkey Central Anatolia)
- Coordinates: 37°14′N 32°58′E
- Country: Turkey
- Province: Karaman
- Seat: Kazımkarabekir

Government
  - Kaymakam: Ramazan Aykut Saka
- Area: 423 km^{2} (163 sq mi)
- Population (2022): 4,531
  - Density: 11/km^{2} (28/sq mi)
- Time zone: UTC+3 (TRT)
- Website: www.kazimkarabekir.gov.tr

Kazımkarabekir District is a district of the Karaman Province of Turkey. Its seat is the town of Kazımkarabekir. Its area is 423 km^{2}, and its population is 4,531 (2022).

== Composition ==
There is one municipality in Kazımkarabekir District:

- Kazımkarabekir

There are 6 villages in Kazımkarabekir District:

- Akarköy
- Karalgazi
- Kızılkuyu
- Mecidiye
- Özyurt
- Sinci
