= Kameni, Karaman =

Kameni
- Village
- Location within Turkey Location within Turkey Central Anatolia
- Coordinates: 37°29′N 33°17′E
- Country: Turkey
- Province: Karaman
- District: Karaman
- Elevation: 1,010 m (3,310 ft)
- Population (2022): 278
- Time zone: UTC+3 (TRT)
- Postal code: 70000
- Area code: 0338

Kameni (formerly Boyalıtepe) is a village in the Karaman District of Karaman Province, Turkey. Its population is 278 (2022). It is situated to the east of Karadağ an extinct volcano. Its distance to Karaman is 39 kilometres (24 mi). The village was founded in the 18th century by Bekdik tribe of Turkmens who had migrated from Kaman. The former name Gamani may refer to Kaman. Initially it was a neighbourhood of a nearby village. But in 1935 it was issued from the nearby village and was declared a village named Boyalıtepe referring to a hill in the village which is covered by rubia (Turkish: boyalık otu).
