= Başyayla District =

District of Karaman Province, Turkey

- District
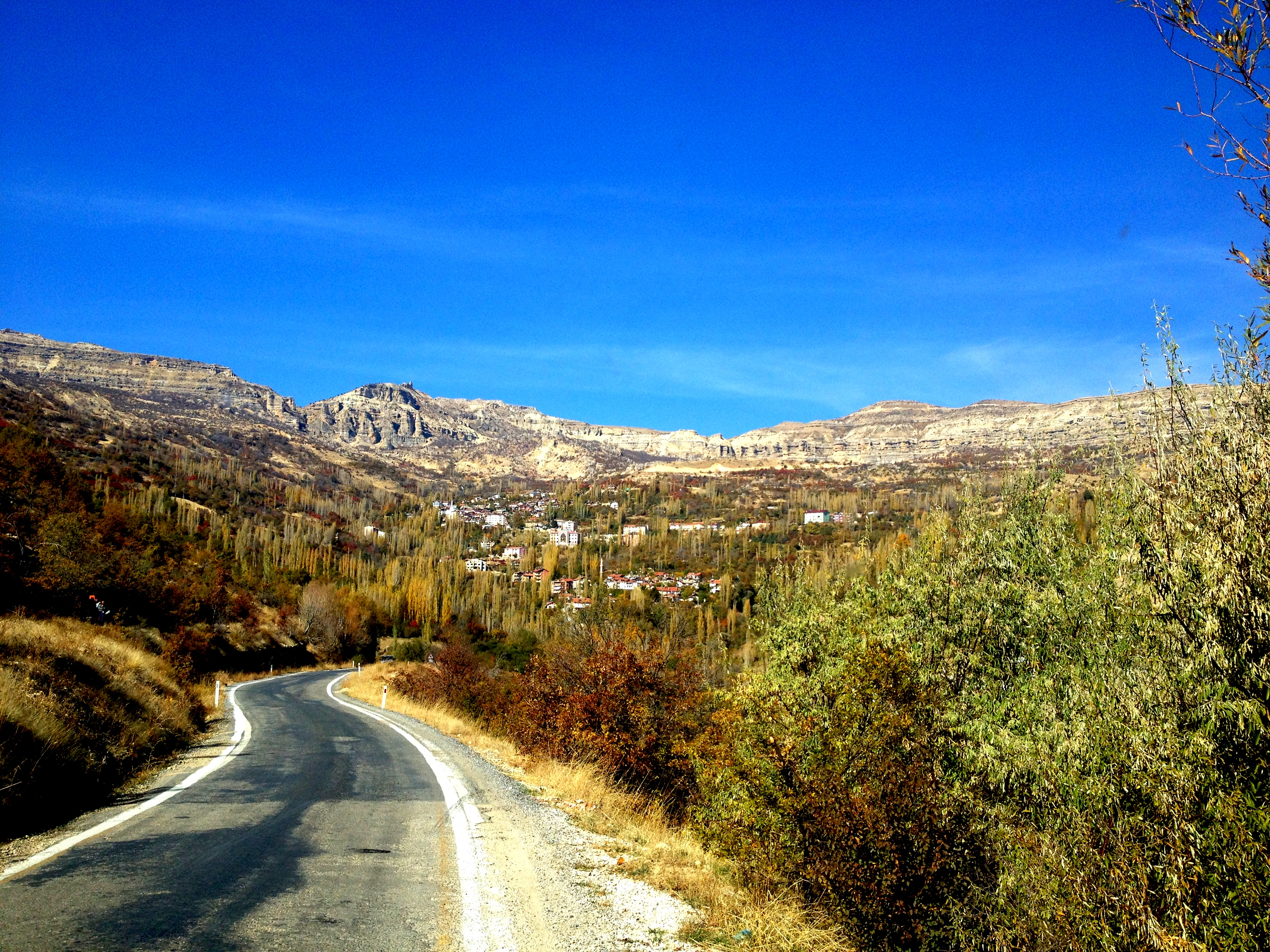
- Bozyaka and countryside, Başyayla

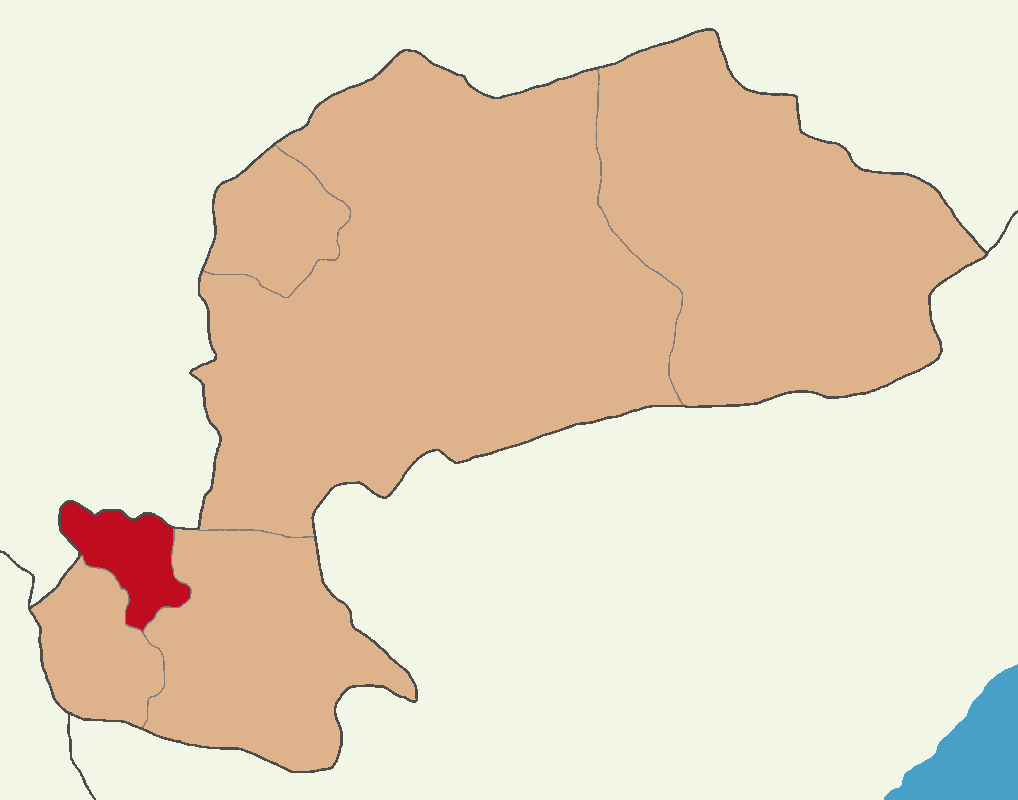
- Map showing Başyayla District in Karaman Province

- Location within Turkey Location within Turkey Central Anatolia
- Coordinates: 36°45′N 32°41′E
- Country: Turkey
- Province: Karaman
- Seat: Başyayla

Government
  - Kaymakam: Erdal Bilgiç
- Area: 141 km^{2} (54 sq mi)
- Population (2022): 3,432
  - Density: 24.3/km^{2} (63.0/sq mi)
- Time zone: UTC+3 (TRT)
- Website: www.basyayla.gov.tr

Başyayla District is a district of the Karaman Province of Turkey. Its seat is the town of Başyayla. Its area is 141 km^{2}, and its population is 3,432 (2022).

== Composition ==
There is one municipality in Başyayla District:

- Başyayla

There are four villages in Başyayla District:

- Bozyaka
- Büyükkarapınar
- Kışlaköy
- Üzümlü
