= Bucakkışla, Karaman =

Bucakkışla
- Village
- Location within Turkey Location within Turkey Central Anatolia
- Coordinates: 36°57′14″N 33°01′36″E
- Country: Turkey
- Province: Karaman
- District: Karaman
- Population (2022): 145
- Time zone: UTC+3 (TRT)
- Postal code: 70000
- Area code: 0338

Bucakkışla is a village in Karaman District of Karaman Province, Turkey. Its population is 145 (2022).

== Geography ==
Bucakkışla is on the way connecting Karaman to Ermenek. Its distance to Karaman is 41 km (25 mi) The average elevation of the village with respect to sea level is 450 m (1,480 ft). Göksu River runs south of Bucakkışla.

== Population ==
The population of Bucakkışla consists of Yörüks (nomadic Oghuz Turks). Most of them are probably of Bıçakçı tribe. During the early Ottoman Empire era, they initially used the location as their winter quarters, and in the 19th century Bucakkışla became their permanent settlement. Although the village was declared a bucak center in 1930, which is administratively more important than a village, the population declined towards the end of the 20th century because of migration to cities.

== Economy ==
Main economic activity is greenhouse vegetable and fruit growing. Pomegranate, fig and olive are among the main products.

== See also ==
- Bıçakçı Bridge
