= Adaköy, Karaman =

Adaköy
- Village
- Location within Turkey Location within Turkey Central Anatolia
- Coordinates: 36°54′N 32°54′E
- Country: Turkey
- Province: Karaman
- District: Karaman
- Elevation: 1,030 m (3,380 ft)
- Population (2022): 174
- Time zone: UTC+3 (TRT)
- Postal code: 70000
- Area code: 0338

Adaköy (also: Ada) is a village in the Karaman District of Karaman Province, Turkey. Its population is 174 (2022). It is situated in the mountainous area to the south east of Karaman. It is called Adaköy (meaning "island village") because it is almost surrounded by creeks. Its distance to Karaman is 65 kilometres (40 mi).
