= Çoğlu, Karaman =

Çoğlu
- Village
- Location within Turkey Location within Turkey Central Anatolia
- Coordinates: 37°26′N 33°19′E
- Country: Turkey
- Province: Karaman
- District: Karaman
- Elevation: 1,010 m (3,310 ft)
- Population (2022): 665
- Time zone: UTC+3 (TRT)
- Postal code: 70000
- Area code: 0338

Çoğlu is a village in the Karaman District of Karaman Province, Turkey. Its population is 665 (2022). It is situated to the east of Karadağ, an extinct volcano. Its distance to Karaman is 35 kilometres (22 mi). The village was founded in 1748 by Turkmens as a caravan stop on the road to Mecca for pilgrimage. It was also a market town, and the name Çoğlu (roughly meaning "many people") refers to crowd in the market days. The main economic activity is agriculture. Cereals are the main products. Sugar beet is also produced. Since there is no river nearby, the irrigation water is supplied by pumping. Animal breeding, especially ovine breeding, is a secondary activity.
