= Ayrancı District =

District of Karaman Province, Turkey

- District
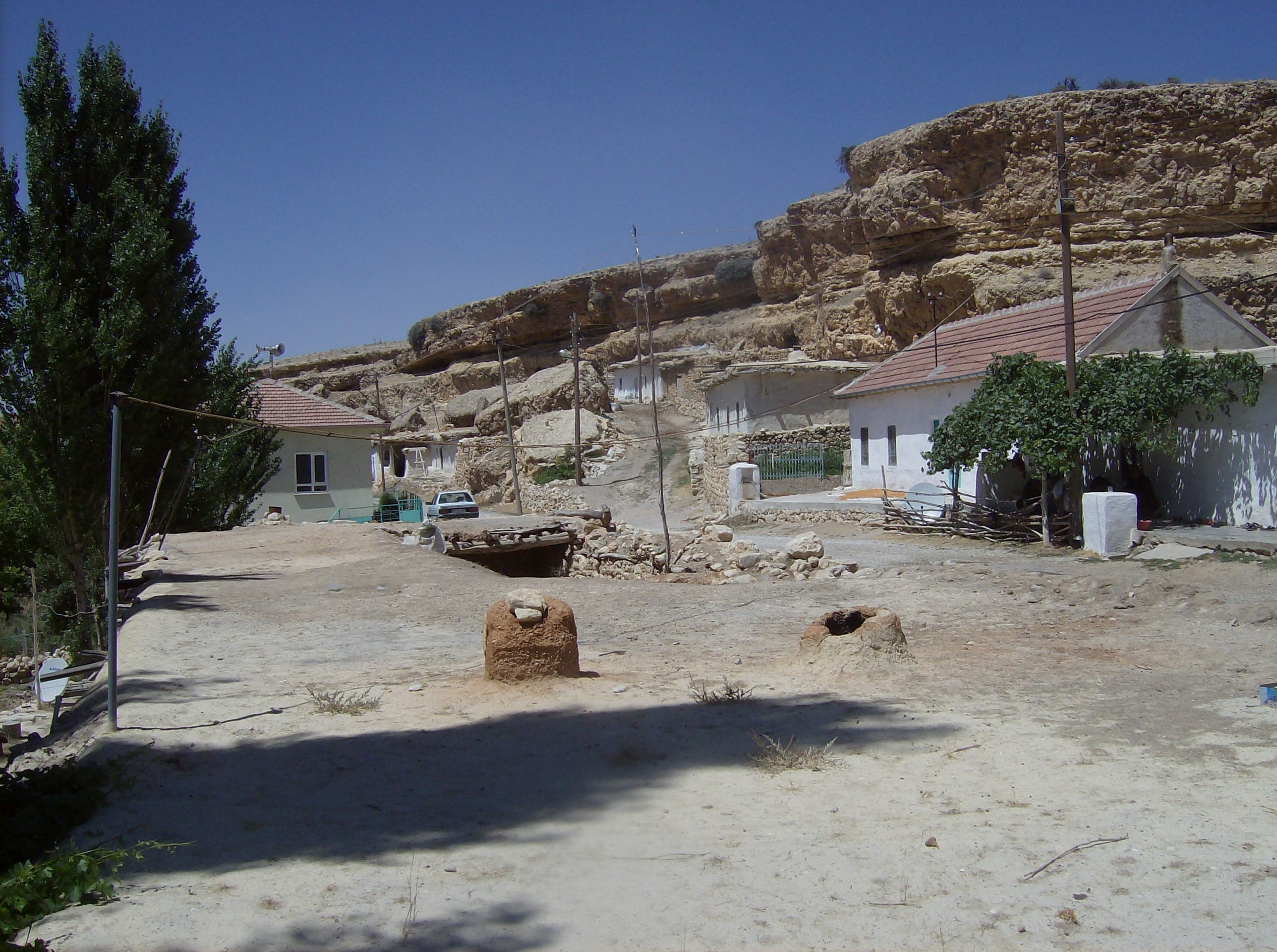
- Akpınar village, Ayrancı

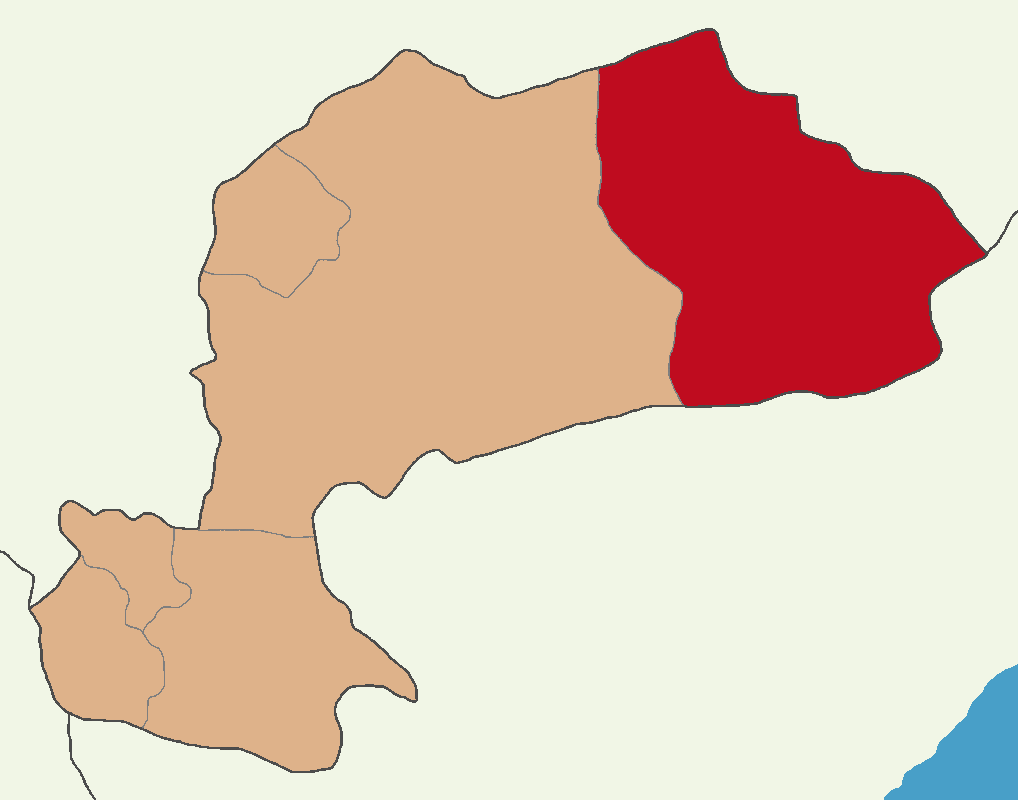
- Map showing Ayrancı District in Karaman Province

- Location within Turkey Location within Turkey Central Anatolia
- Coordinates: 37°21′N 33°41′E
- Country: Turkey
- Province: Karaman
- Seat: Ayrancı

Government
  - Kaymakam: Fatih Eroğlu
- Area: 2,245 km^{2} (867 sq mi)
- Population (2022): 7,608
  - Density: 3.389/km^{2} (8.777/sq mi)
- Time zone: UTC+3 (TRT)
- Website: www.ayranci.gov.tr

Ayrancı District is a district of the Karaman Province of Turkey. Its seat is the town of Ayrancı. Its area is 2,245 km^{2}, and its population is 7,608 (2022).

== Composition ==
There is one municipality in Ayrancı District:

- Ayrancı

There are 22 villages in Ayrancı District:

- Ağızboğaz
- Akpınar
- Ambar
- Berendi
- Böğecik
- Buğdaylı
- Büyükkoraş
- Çatköy
- Divle
- Dokuzyol
- Hüyükburun
- Kaleköy
- Karaağaç
- Kavaközü
- Kavuklar
- Kayaönü
- Kıraman
- Küçükkoraş
- Melikli
- Pınarkaya
- Sarayköy
- Yarıkkuyu
