= Kisecik =

- Village
- Location within Turkey Location within Turkey Central Anatolia
- Coordinates: 37°23′N 33°01′E
- Country: Turkey
- Province: Karaman
- District: Karaman
- Elevation: 1,045 m (3,428 ft)
- Population (2022): 548
- Time zone: UTC+3 (TRT)
- Postal code: 70130
- Area code: 0338

Kisecik is a village in the Karaman District of Karaman Province, Turkey. Its population is 548 (2022). Before the 2013 reorganisation, it was a town (belde). It is situated to the west of the Karadağ Mountain. The distance to Karaman is 35 km (22 mi). The name of the town means "poor" in older Turkish, because the earliest inhabitants were nomads. The town was founded as a result of an operation of the Ottoman Empire government to settle the nomadic tribes in 1887. The government settled the Turkmen tribe named Sarıkeçili in the Kisecik. In 1991 the settlement was declared a seat of township. The main crops of the town are cereals, legume and sugarbeet.
