= Burunoba, Karaman =

Burunoba
- Village
- Location within Turkey Location within Turkey Central Anatolia
- Coordinates: 37°27′N 33°21′E
- Country: Turkey
- Province: Karaman
- District: Karaman
- Elevation: 1,010 m (3,310 ft)
- Population (2022): 220
- Time zone: UTC+3 (TRT)
- Postal code: 70000
- Area code: 0338

Burunoba is a village in the Karaman District of Karaman Province, Turkey. Its population is 220 (2022). It is situated to the east of Karadağ, an extinct volcano. Its distance to Karaman is 37 kilometres (23 mi). The village was founded in 1873 by Turkmens. The main economic activity is agriculture.
