= Demiryurt, Karaman =

Demiryurt
- Village
- Location within Turkey Location within Turkey Central Anatolia
- Coordinates: 37°20′N 33°04′E
- Country: Turkey
- Province: Karaman
- District: Karaman
- Elevation: 1,020 m (3,350 ft)
- Population (2022): 192
- Time zone: UTC+3 (TRT)
- Postal code: 70000
- Area code: 0338

Demiryurt is a village in the Karaman District of Karaman Province, Turkey. Its population is 192 (2022). It is situated to the west of Karadağ an extinct volcano. Its distance to Karaman is 25 kilometres (16 mi). The main economic activity of the village is agriculture.
