= Yollarbaşı =

- Village
- Location within Turkey Location within Turkey Central Anatolia
- Coordinates: 37°12′N 33°02′E
- Country: Turkey
- Province: Karaman
- District: Karaman
- Elevation: 1,040 m (3,410 ft)
- Population (2022): 971
- Time zone: UTC+3 (TRT)
- Postal code: 70170
- Area code: 0338

Yollarbaşı (former İlisira) is a village in the Karaman District of Karaman Province, Turkey. Its population is 971 (2022). Before the 2013 reorganisation, it was a town (belde). It is 18 kilometres (11 mi) west of Karaman on the state highway D.715 which connects Karaman to Konya.

Yollarbaşı is an old settlement. It was probably founded during the Phrygian era. During the Roman era it was a city of Isaura. Although not supported by sources, the town people believe that the town may be Lystra, one of the important cities which Paul the Apostle visited. Modern scholars place the ancient town of Ilistra at or near Yollarbaşı. There are six church ruins in the town. Yollarbaşı is a typical Central Anatolian town where the main economic activity is agriculture.
