= Karaman District =

District of Karaman Province, Turkey

- District
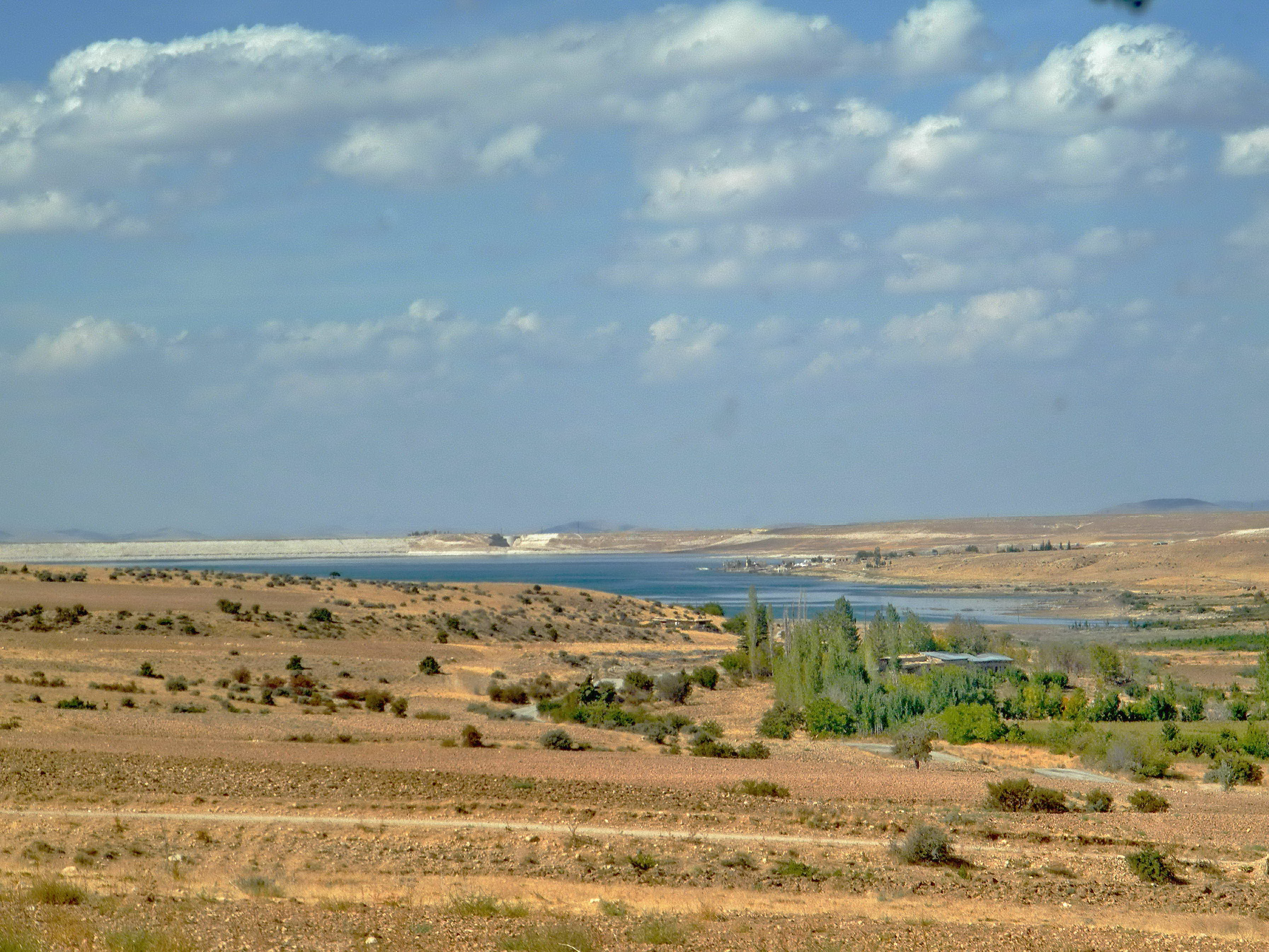
- reservoir near Yeşildere, Karaman

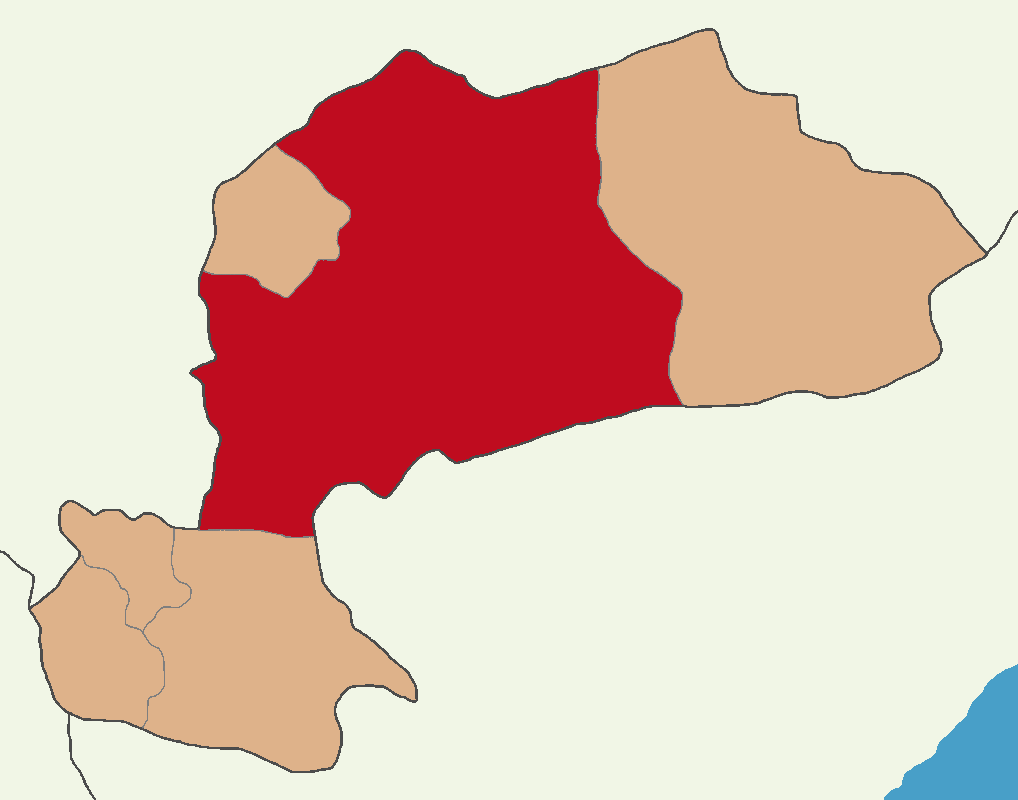
- Map showing Karaman District in Karaman Province

- Location within Turkey Location within Turkey Central Anatolia
- Coordinates: 37°11′N 33°13′E
- Country: Turkey
- Province: Karaman
- Seat: Karaman
- Area: 4,036 km^{2} (1,558 sq mi)
- Population (2022): 206,240
  - Density: 51.10/km^{2} (132.3/sq mi)
- Time zone: UTC+3 (TRT)

Karaman District (also: Merkez, meaning "central" in Turkish) is a district of the Karaman Province of Turkey. Its seat is the city of Karaman. Its population is 206,240 (2022). With an area of 4,036 km^{2}, it is the largest district of Turkey.

== Composition ==
There are three municipalities in Karaman District:

- Akçaşehir
- Karaman
- Sudurağı

There are 93 villages in Karaman District:

- Adaköy
- Ağaçyurdu
- Ağılönü
- Akçaalan
- Akpınar
- Alaçatı
- Aşağıakın
- Aşağıkızılca
- Aybastı
- Bademli
- Barutkavuran
- Başkışla
- Bayırköy
- Beydili
- Bölükyazı
- Bostanözü
- Boyalı
- Bozkandak
- Bucakkışla
- Burhan
- Burunoba
- Çakırbağ
- Çatak
- Çavuşpınarı
- Cerit
- Çiğdemli
- Çimenkuyu
- Çoğlu
- Çukurbağ
- Çukurköy
- Dağkonak
- Damlapınar
- Değirmenbaşı
- Demiryurt
- Dere
- Dinek
- Eğilmez
- Ekinözü
- Elmadağı
- Eminler
- Erenkavak
- Göçer
- Gökçe
- Göztepe
- Güçler
- Güldere
- Gülkaya
- Hamidiye
- İhsaniye
- İslihisar
- Kalaba
- Kameni
- Karacaören
- Kaşoba
- Kılbasan
- Kızık
- Kızıllarağını
- Kızılyaka
- Kisecik
- Kozlubucak
- Kurtderesi
- Kurucabel
- Lale
- Madenşehri
- Medreselik
- Mesudiye
- Morcalı
- Muratdede
- Narlıdere
- Ortaoba
- Osmaniye
- Özdemir
- Paşabağı
- Pınarbaşı
- Salur
- Sarıkaya
- Sazlıyaka
- Şeyhler
- Seyithasan
- Süleymanhacı
- Tarlaören
- Taşkale
- Tavşanlı
- Üçbaş
- Üçkuyu
- Yazılı
- Yeşildere
- Yılangömü
- Yollarbaşı
- Yukarıakın
- Yukarıkızılca
- Yuvatepe
- Zengen
