= Bayırköy, Karaman =

Village in Karaman Province, Turkey

Bayırköy
- Village
- Location within Turkey Location within Turkey Central Anatolia
- Coordinates: 36°55′38″N 32°54′24″E
- Country: Turkey
- Province: Karaman
- District: Karaman
- Population (2022): 472
- Time zone: UTC+3 (TRT)

Bayırköy (also: Bayır) is a village in Karaman District, Karaman Province, Turkey. Its population is 472 (2022).

Its distance to Karaman is 70 kilometres (43 mi) Bayırköy is a typical agricultural village. It was a grape producer. However recently cherry replaced grapes.
