= Taşkale, Karaman =

Taşkale
- Village
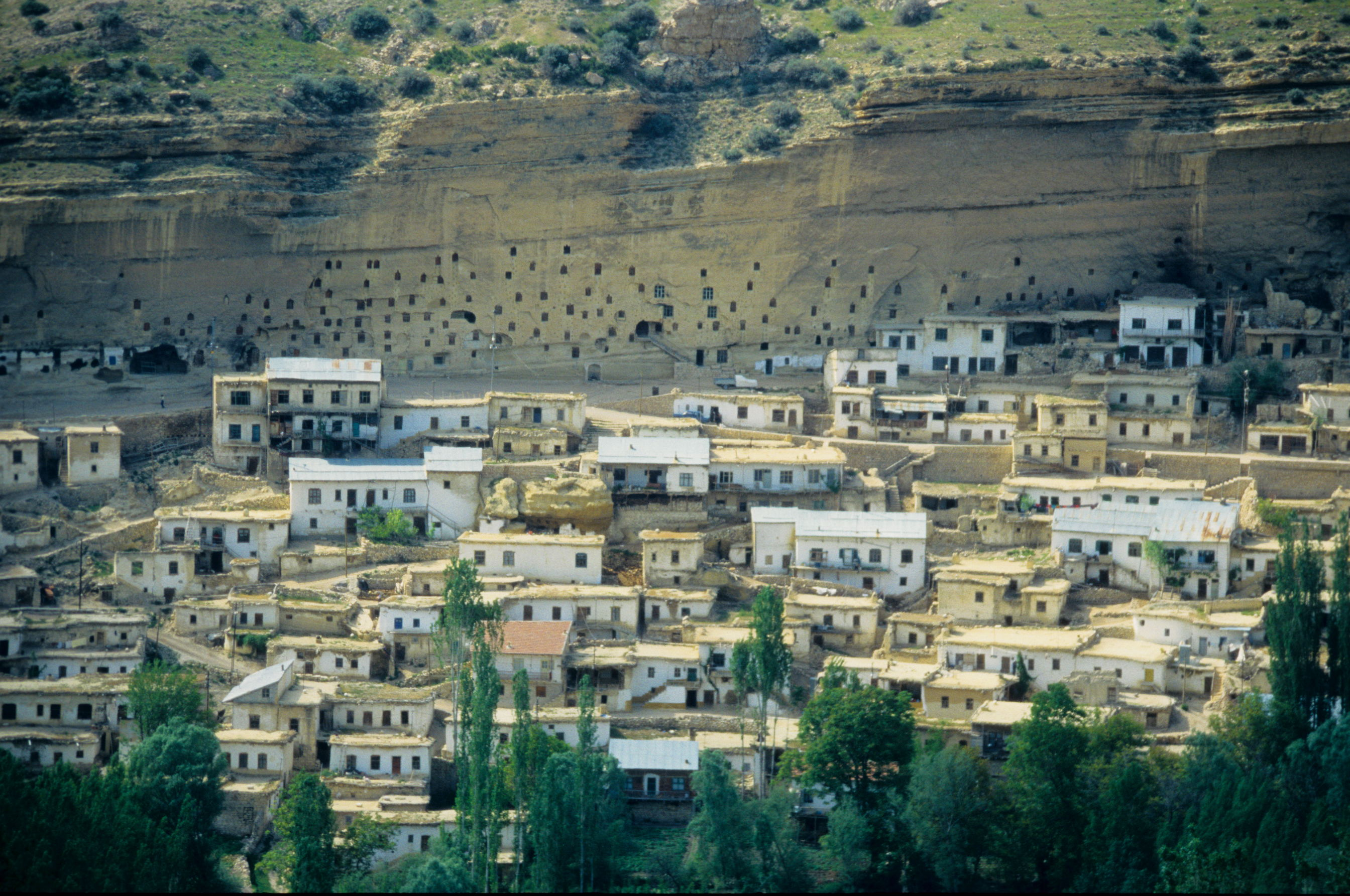
- Taşkale village with the caves in the background

- Location within Turkey Location within Turkey Central Anatolia
- Coordinates: 37°08′31″N 33°36′40″E
- Country: Turkey
- Province: Karaman
- District: Karaman
- Elevation: 1,340 m (4,400 ft)
- Population (2022): 484
- Time zone: UTC+3 (TRT)
- Postal code: 70150
- Area code: 0338

Taşkale (formerly: Kızıllar) is a village in Karaman District, Karaman Province, Central Anatolia, Turkey. Its population is 484 (2022). Before the 2013 reorganisation, it was a town (belde).

== Geography ==
Taşkale is on the northern slopes of the Toros Mountains. It lies to the east of Karaman, about 45 km (28 mi) by road. In the older part of the village there is a series of caves which are used presently as cereal silos. The modern part of the village is in the plains just to the north of the older part.

== History and people ==
The town was used by early Christians who used the caves as effective shelter against the Roman authorities. The Mamazan Monastery just at the west of the town is also a cave monastery. After Christianity was legalized, the town probably lost its importance. But in the 13th century the town regained its importance as a hideaway. During Mongol expansion, a Turkmen tribe named Kızıl from the valley of along Atrek River (modern Turkmenistan) migrated to Taşkale. Some authors claimed that Mustafa Kemal Atatürk's ancestors originated from this town. According to this claim, Mustafa Kemal Atatürk's paternal lineage migrated from Karaman to Macedonia. The family, which settled in the Kodžadžik village of the Debre-i Bala district of the Monastir Province, migrated to Thessaloniki around 1830. However, it is also believed that Mustafa Kemal Atatürk's father, Ali Rıza Efendi, was originally from Thessaloniki. His ancestors left Vidin and settled in Serres, from where they settled in Thessaloniki, or perhaps they settled in Thessaloniki from Aydın/Söke. It has also been suggested that Ali Rıza Efendi was of Slavic or Albanian origin.

== Economy ==
The main economic activity is the production of hand-made rugs. There are over 200 handlooms and the rugs produced in Taşkale are known as Kızıllar rugs (or sometimes Kızıllar ladiği).
