= Çakırbağ =

- Village
- Location within Turkey Location within Turkey Central Anatolia
- Coordinates: 37°11′N 33°09′E
- Country: Turkey
- Province: Karaman
- District: Karaman
- Elevation: 1,025 m (3,363 ft)
- Population (2022): 1,540
- Time zone: UTC+3 (TRT)
- Postal code: 70000
- Area code: 0338

Çakırbağ (former Dilbeyan) is a village in the Karaman District of Karaman Province, Turkey. Its population is 1,540 (2022). It is 5 kilometres (3.1 mi) north west of Karaman on the state highway D.715 which connects Karaman to Konya. Çakırbağ is a Tatar town founded during Ottoman Empire era.
