= Gödet Dam =

Coordinates: 37.1163°N 33.2786°E

- Location: Turkey

Gödet Dam is a dam in Turkey. The development was backed by the Turkish State Hydraulic Works.

== See also ==
- List of dams and reservoirs in Turkey
