= Yeşildere, Karaman =

Yeşildere
- Village
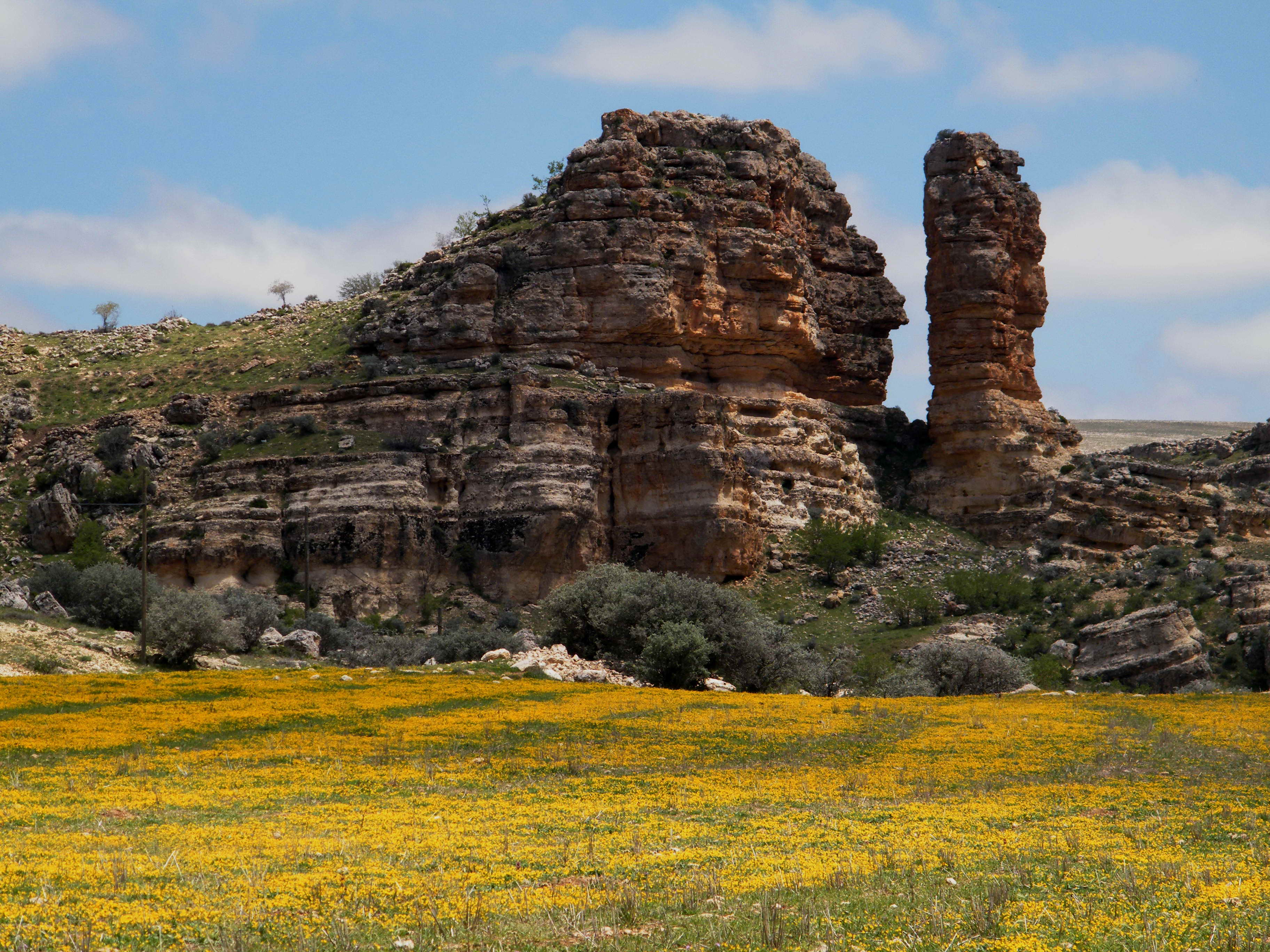
- Yeşildere Rock Formation

- Location within Turkey Location within Turkey Central Anatolia
- Coordinates: 37°10′N 33°30′E
- Country: Turkey
- Province: Karaman
- District: Karaman
- Elevation: 1,200 m (3,900 ft)
- Population (2022): 798
- Time zone: UTC+3 (TRT)
- Postal code: 70160
- Area code: 0338

Yeşildere is a village in Karaman District, Karaman Province, Turkey. Its population is 798 (2022). Before the 2013 reorganisation, it was a town (belde).

== Geography ==
Yeşildere is 35 kilometres (22 mi) east of Karaman. The town is situated at the south Toros Mountains along the valley of İbrala rivulet.

== History ==
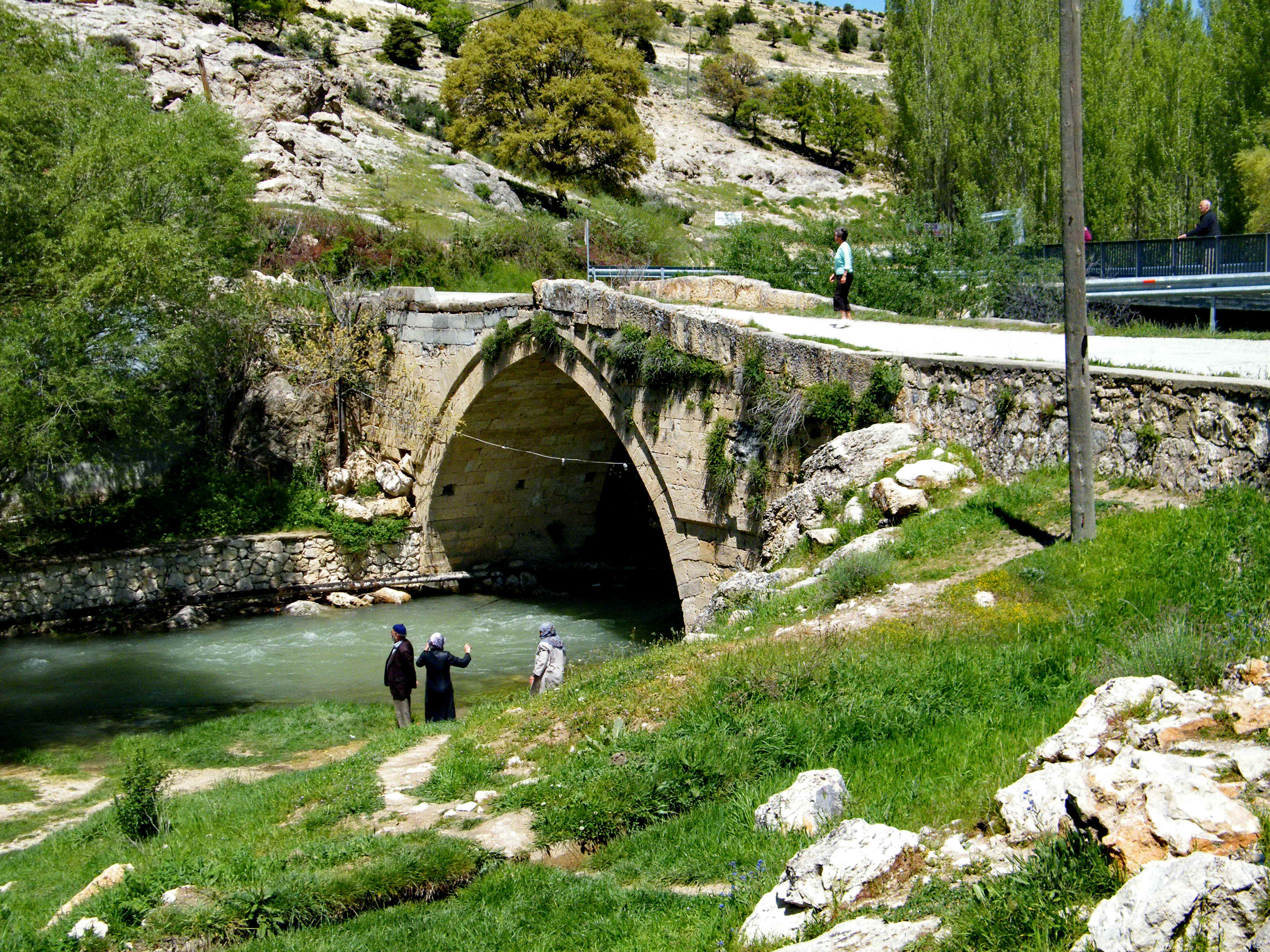
The Englishman Edwin John Davis (1826-1901) mentions the historic arched bridge of İbrala in the Yeşildere as a structure from the Karamanid-Seljuk period.

The former name of the town was İbrala. Only a few documents about the history of İbrala survive. Probably the town was founded during medieval age, for the mosque of the town had been built on the ruins of a church (The name of the mosque is kilisecamii meaning church mosque) However, there were Christian Turks around Karaman area up to 20th century and the church might be built at a later period. (see Karamanlides) Formerly a village, Yeşildere was declared a town in 1954.

== Economy ==
Yeşildere is a typical agricultural town. Irrigation has always been a problem . But there is a small dam under construction on the rivulet which is planned to irrigate 13,000 hectares (32,000 acres). Yeşildere residents hope that this may prevent further loss in population.
