= Sudurağı =

- Municipality
- Location in Turkey Sudurağı (Turkey Central Anatolia)
- Coordinates: 37°17′N 33°22′E
- Country: Turkey
- Province: Karaman
- District: Karaman
- Elevation: 1,015 m (3,330 ft)
- Population (2022): 2,314
- Time zone: UTC+3 (TRT)
- Postal code: 70140
- Area code: 0338

Sudurağı (formerly: Sidivre) is a town (belde) in the Karaman District, Karaman Province, Turkey. Its population is 2,314 (2022). Situated in the vast Central Anatolia plains it is 20 kilometres (12 mi) north east of Karaman. The original settlement was nothing but a base to protect the caravan route during the Ottoman Empire era. After the Turkmens settlements the Sudurağı was declared a seat of township.
