= Ağılönü, Karaman =

Ağılönü
- Village
- Location within Turkey Location within Turkey Central Anatolia
- Coordinates: 37°14′N 33°22′E
- Country: Turkey
- Province: Karaman
- District: Karaman
- Elevation: 1,040 m (3,410 ft)
- Population (2022): 234
- Time zone: UTC+3 (TRT)
- Postal code: 70110
- Area code: 0338

Ağılönü is a village the Karaman District of Karaman Province, Turkey. Its population is 234 (2022). It is situated to the east of Karaman and to the South of Turkish state highway D.350 which connects Karaman to east. Its distance to Karaman is 17 kilometres (11 mi). Major economic activities of the village are agriculture and animal breeding.
