= Kazımkarabekir =

- Municipality
- Location within Turkey Location within Turkey Central Anatolia
- Coordinates: 37°13′49″N 32°57′32″E
- Country: Turkey
- Province: Karaman
- District: Kazımkarabekir

Government
  - Mayor: Recep Boyacıoğlu (MHP)
- Elevation: 1,044 m (3,425 ft)
- Population (2022): 3,456
- Time zone: UTC+3 (TRT)
- Area code: 0338
- Website: www.kazimkarabekir.bel.tr

Kazımkarabekir is a town in Karaman Province in the Central Anatolia region of Turkey. It is the seat of Kazımkarabekir District. Its population is 3,456 (2022). Its elevation is 1,044 m (3,425 ft).
