= Akçaşehir, Karaman =

Akçaşehir
- Municipality
- Location within Turkey Location within Turkey Central Anatolia
- Coordinates: 37°27′N 33°30′E
- Country: Turkey
- Province: Karaman
- District: Karaman
- Elevation: 1,010 m (3,310 ft)
- Population (2022): 2,172
- Time zone: UTC+3 (TRT)
- Postal code: 70110
- Area code: 0338

Akçaşehir is a town (belde) in the Karaman District, Karaman Province, Turkey. Its population is 2,172 (2022). It is 45 kilometres (28 mi) northeast of Karaman. Akçaşehir is an old settlement. According to mayor's page the foundation date of the town may be 5000 years ago (Bronze Age). During the early Middle Ages it was a part of the Byzantine Empire. However, there are only a few remains from the deep history. Various Turkmen tribes as well as a Pechenek tribe settled in Akçaşehir in the late 11th and 12th centuries. It was a part of Seljuks in the 13th century, a part of Karamanids in the 14th and early 15th centuries and later a part of Ottoman Empire. The town is situated in a vast plain. Traditional crops are cereals. But lately apple production is on the rise.
