= Karaman Province =

Coordinates: 37°01′23″N 33°05′39″E

Karaman Province Karaman ili
- Province
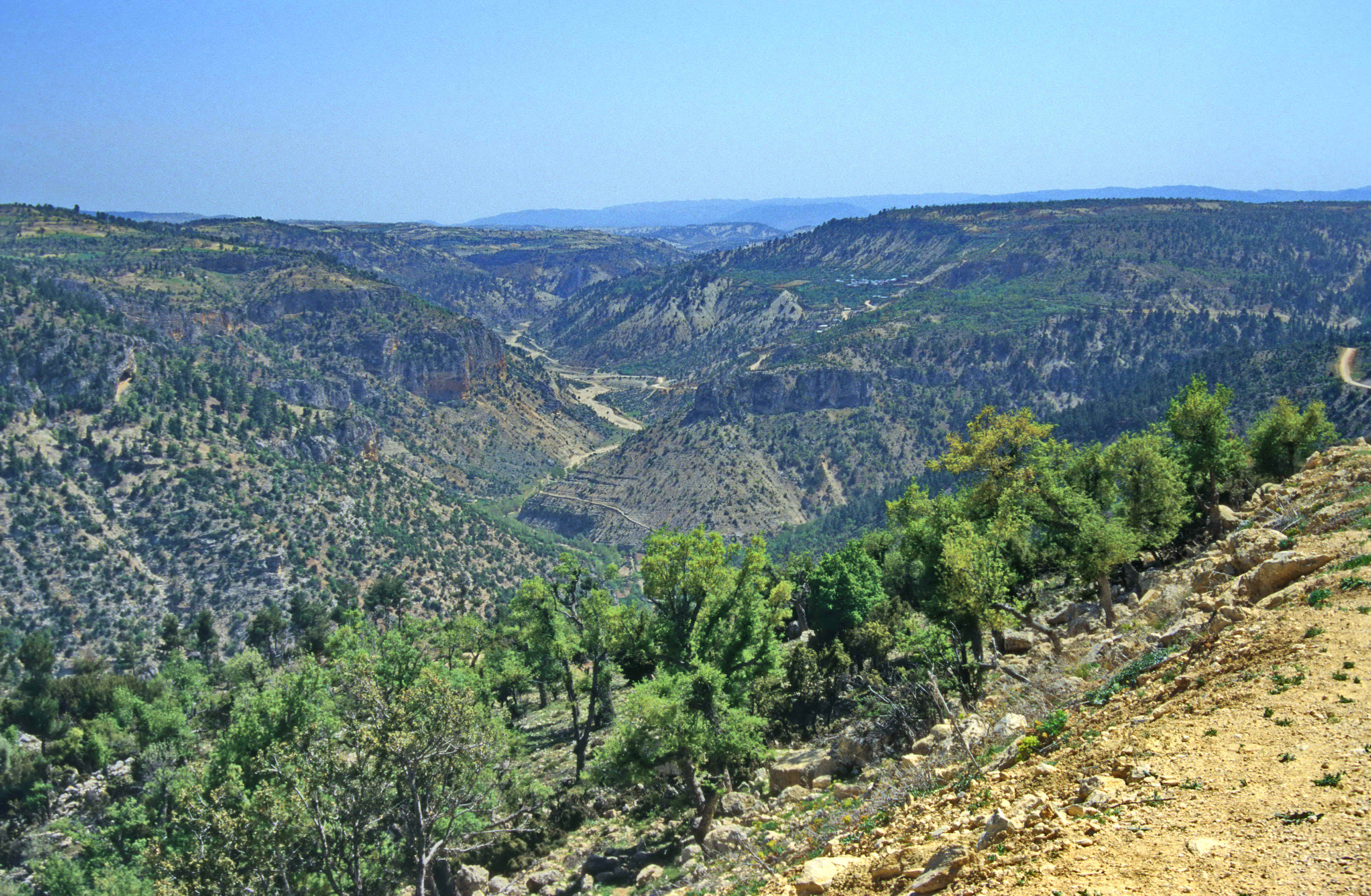
- Taşeli-Plateau, Moca Pass

- Location of the province within Turkey
- Country: Turkey
- Seat: Karaman

Government
  - Governor: Hayrettin Çiçek
- Area: 8,678 km^{2} (3,351 sq mi)
- Population (2022): 260,838
  - Density: 30.06/km^{2} (77.85/sq mi)
- Time zone: UTC+3 (TRT)
- Area code: 0338
- Website: www.karaman.gov.tr

Karaman Province (Turkish: Karaman ili) is a province of south-central Turkey. Its area is 8,678 km^{2}, and its population is 260,838 (2022). According to the 2000 census, the population was 243,210. The population density is 30 people/km^{2}. The traffic code is 70. The capital is the city of Karaman. Karaman was the location of the Karamanid Beylik, which came to an end in 1486.

== Districts and Towns ==
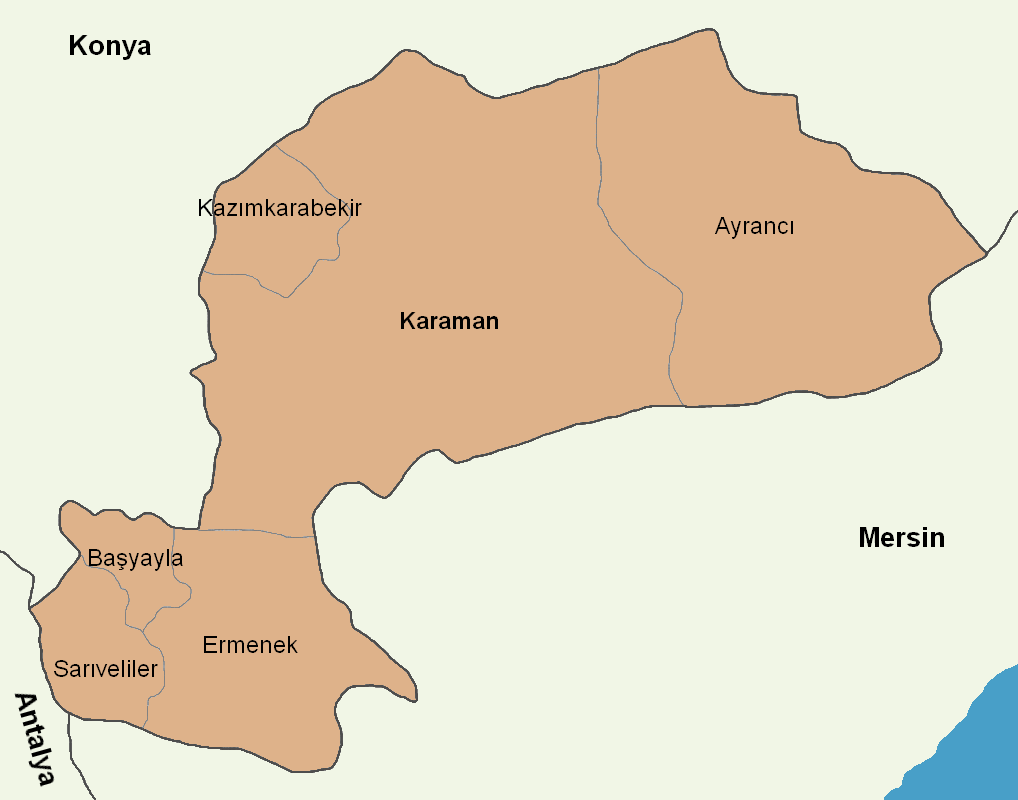

Karaman Province is divided into 6 districts:

- Ayrancı
- Başyayla
- Ermenek
- Karaman
- Kazımkarabekir
- Sarıveliler

Towns include Sudurağı, Akçaşehir, and Güneyyurt.

== Place of interest ==
- Binbirkilise, a region around Mount Karadağ 30 km (19 mi) north of Karaman with Byzantine church ruins.

== Churches ==
- Çeşmeli Kilise (Surp Asvadzadzin Ermeni Kilisesi)
- Fisandon Church
- Binbir Church

== See also ==
- Görmeli, a village on the hillside of the Taurus Mountains near Ermenek
- Mount Karadağ, an extinct volcano north of Karaman city
- List of populated places in Karaman Province

== Gallery ==
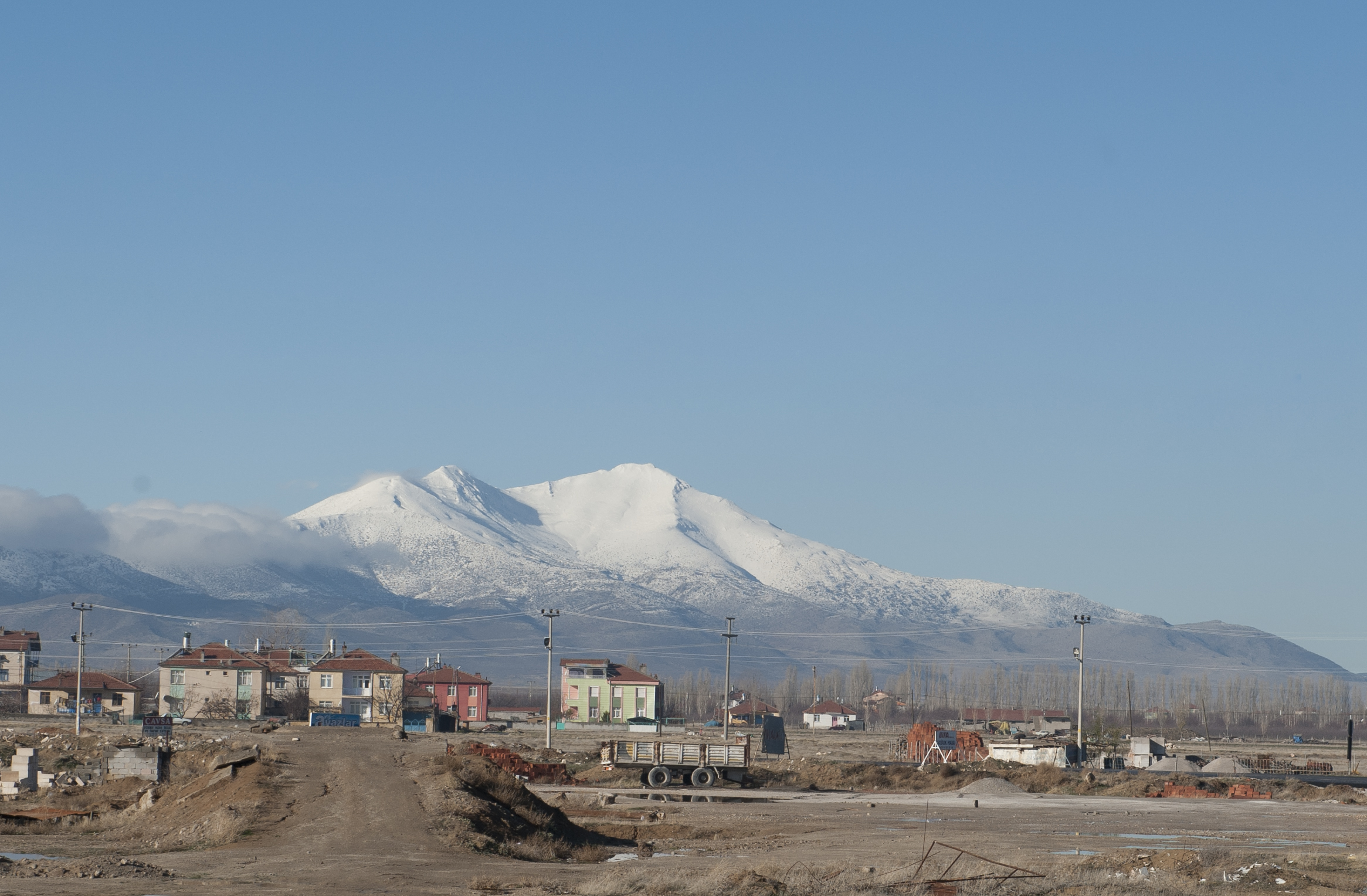
Mount Karadağ

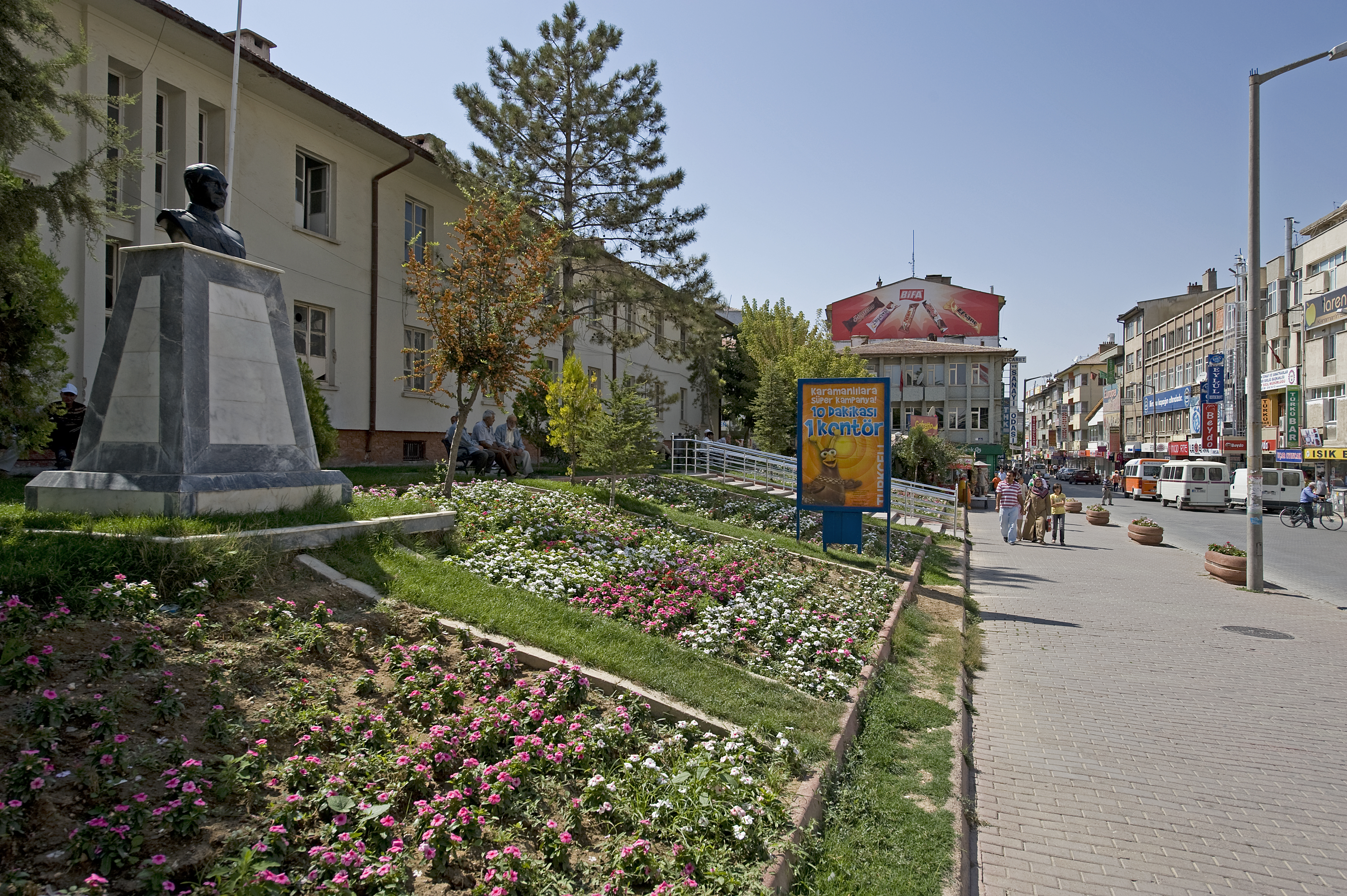
Street in Karaman

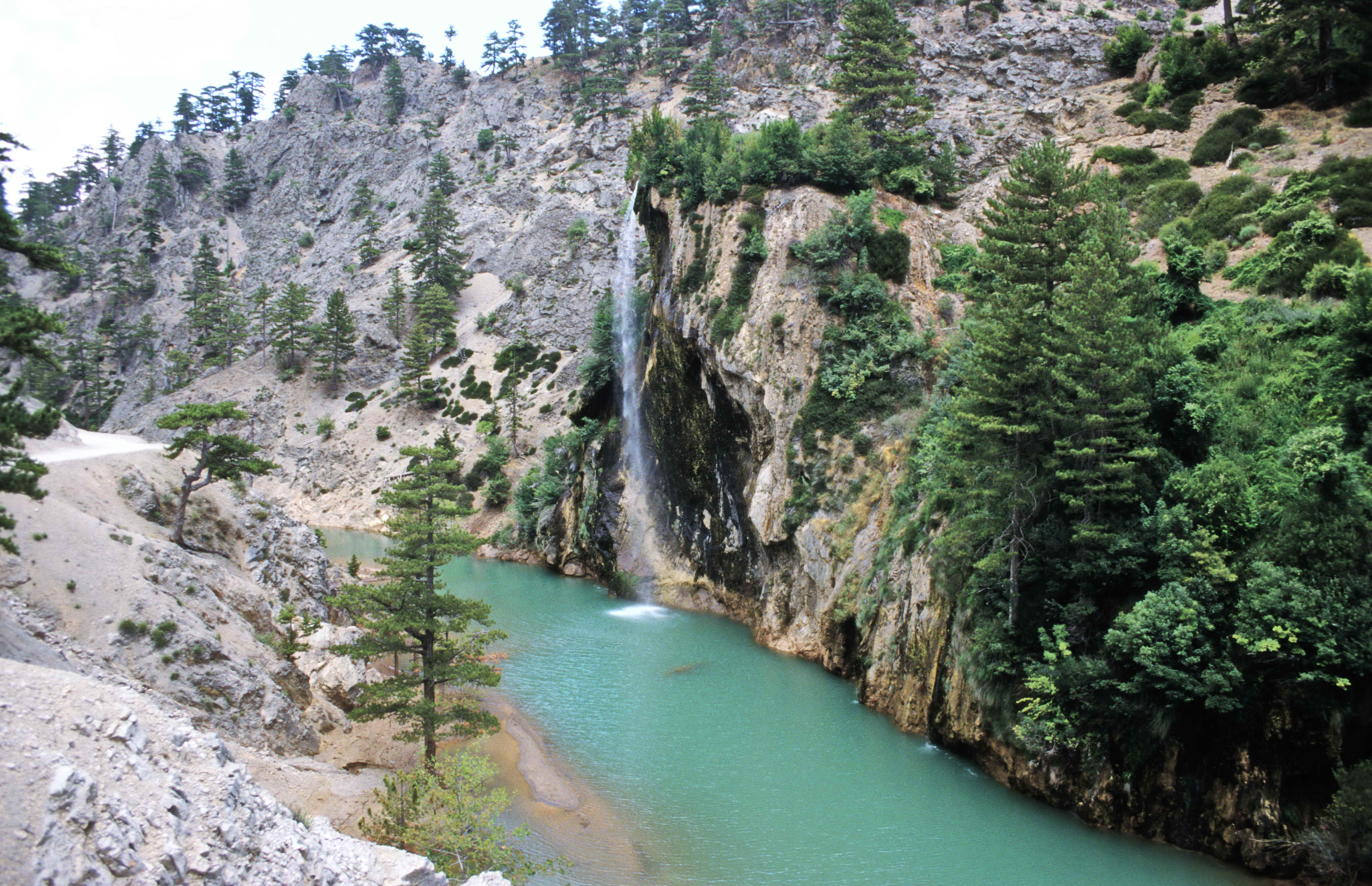
Taşeli-Plateau, Ermenek River

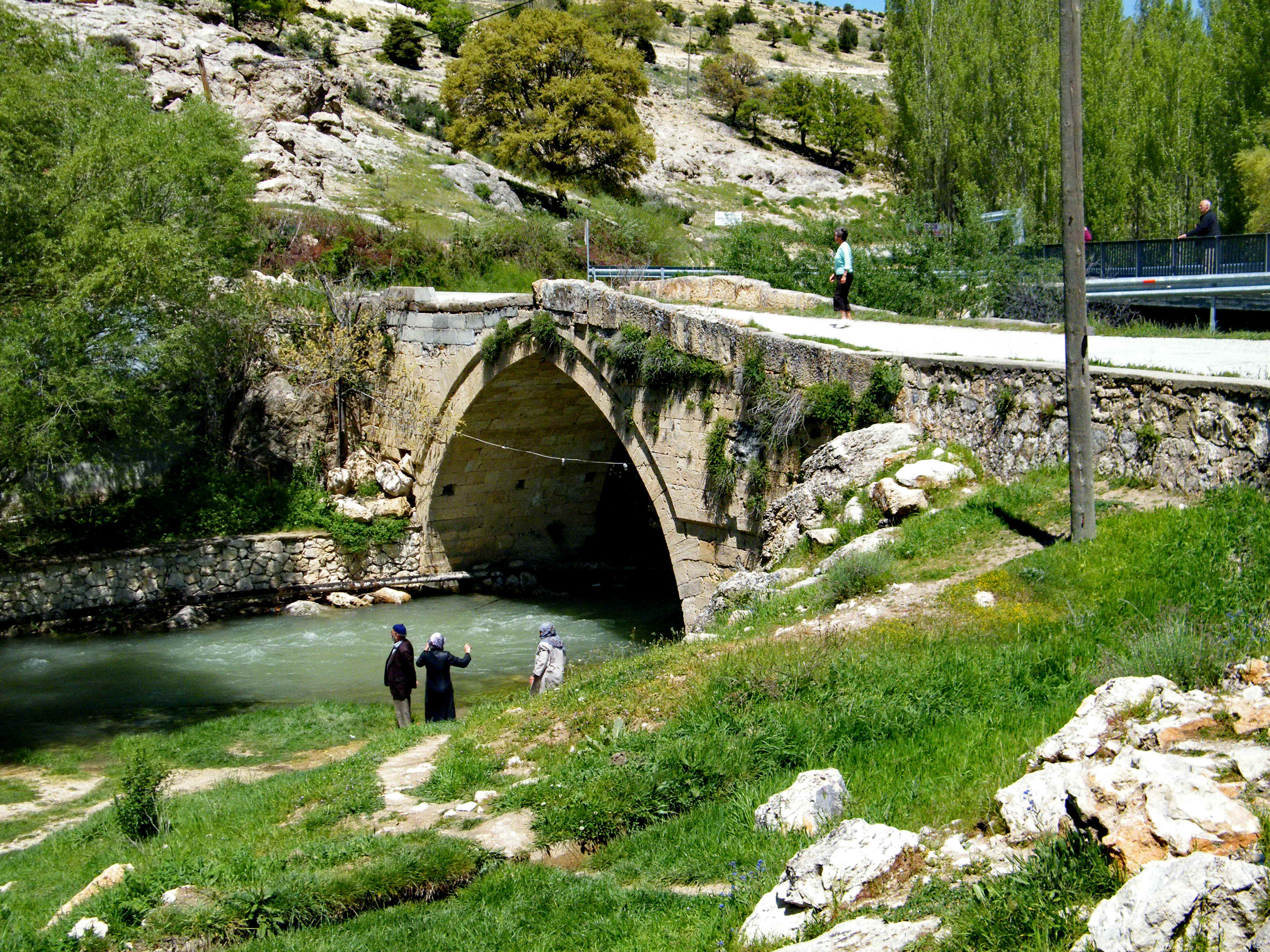
Yeşildere, Akköprü

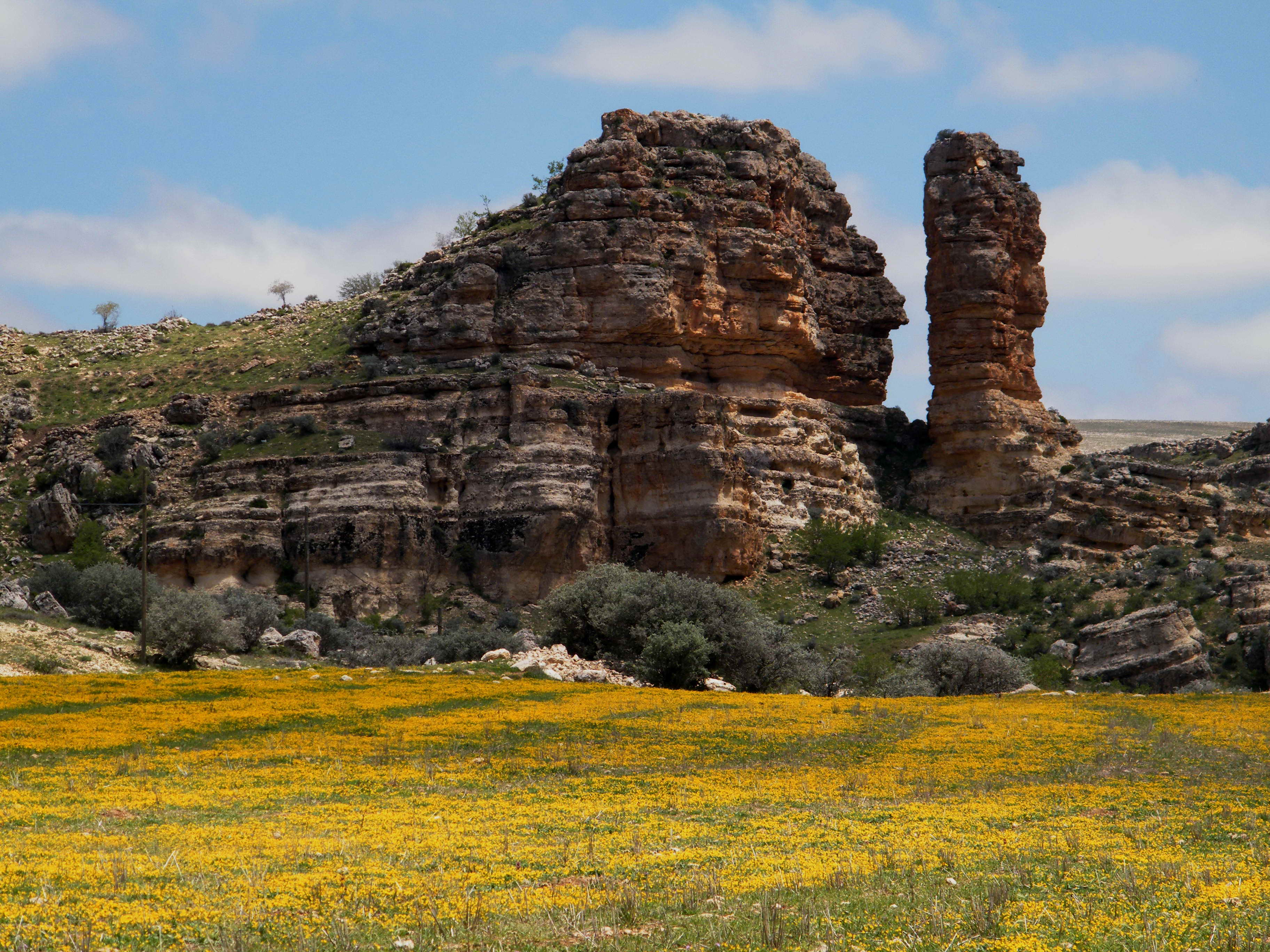
Yeşildere rock formation

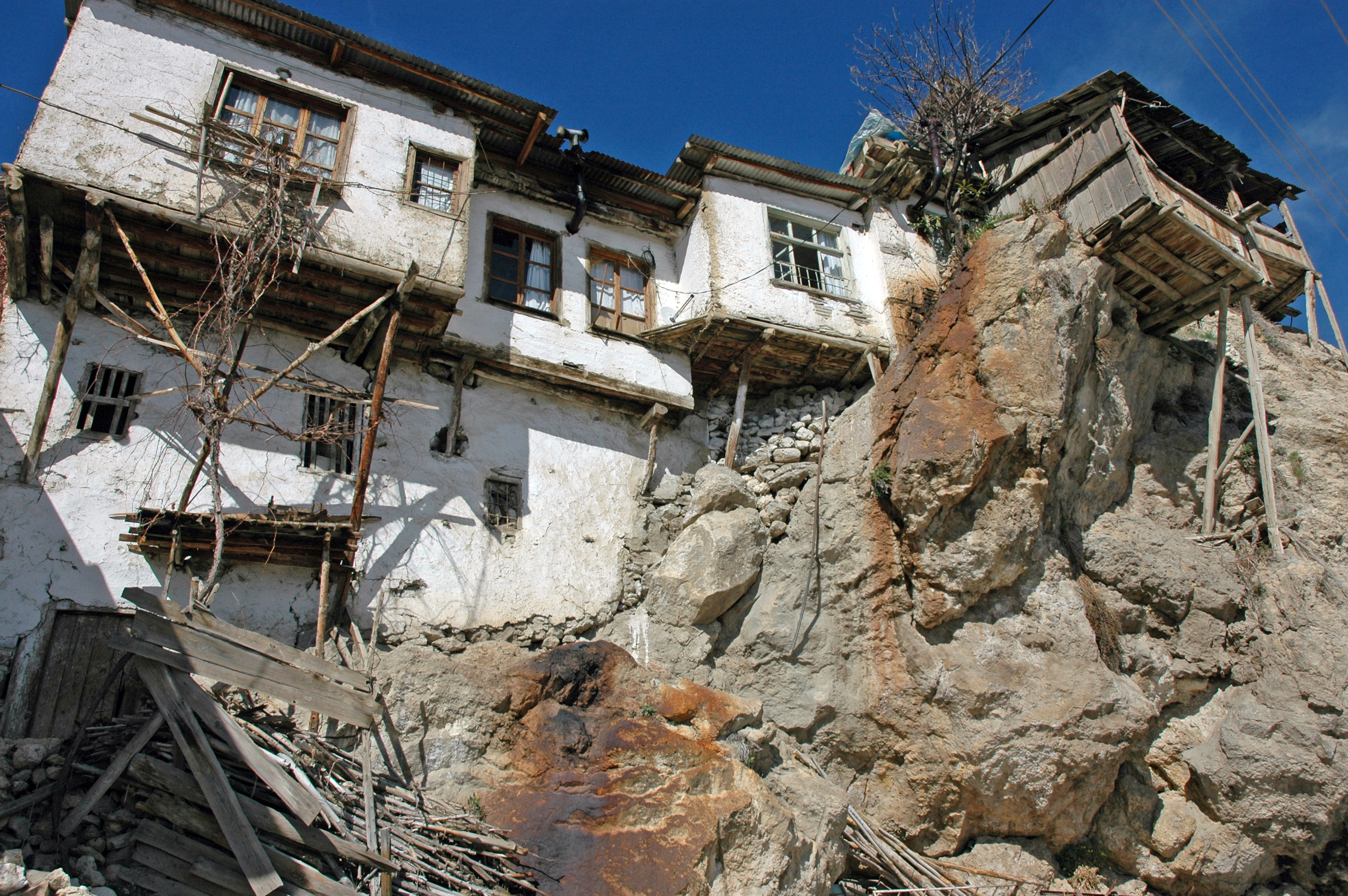
Ermenek old houses

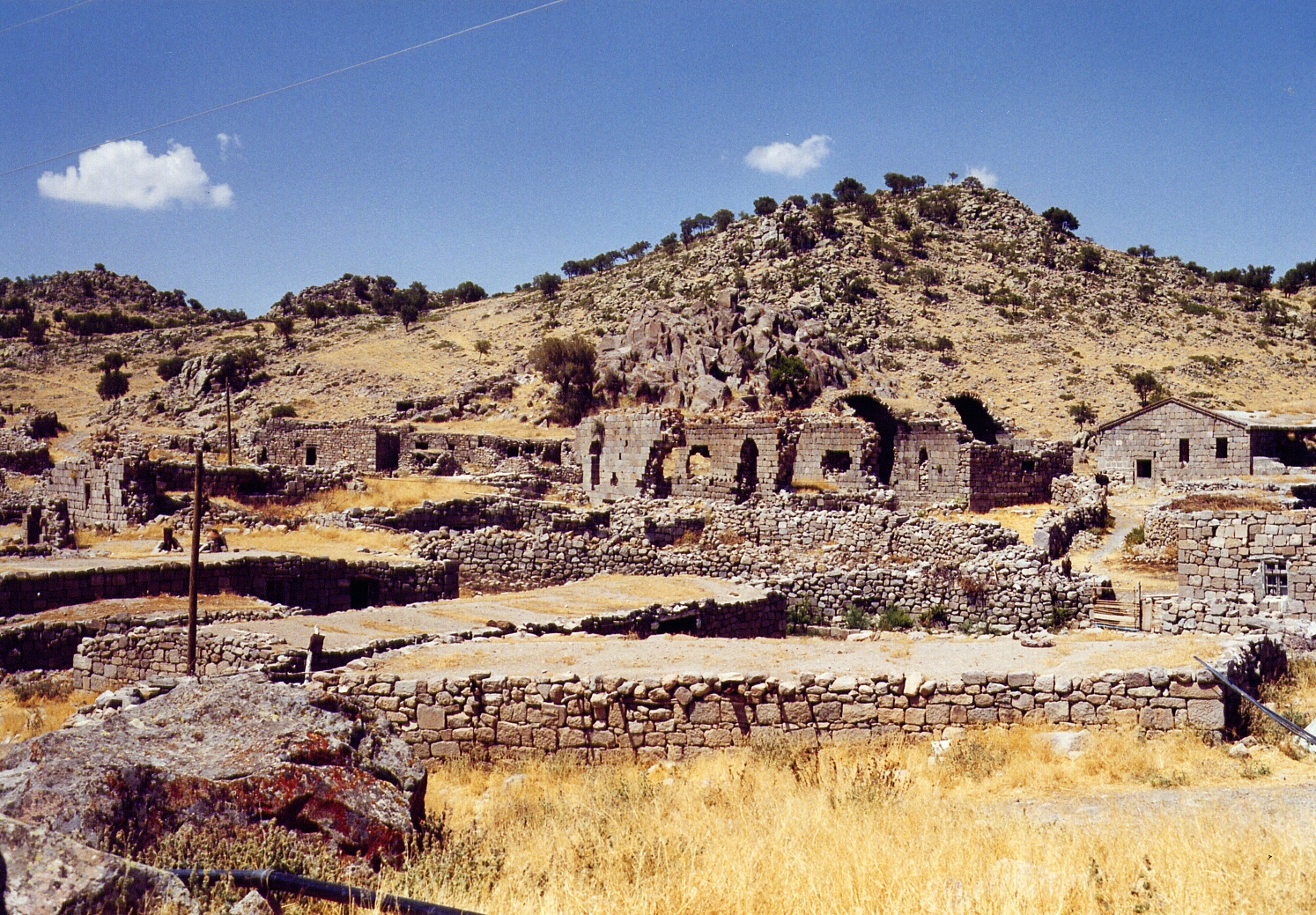
Ruins of Binbirkilise, meaning "Thousand and One Churches" in Üçkuyu

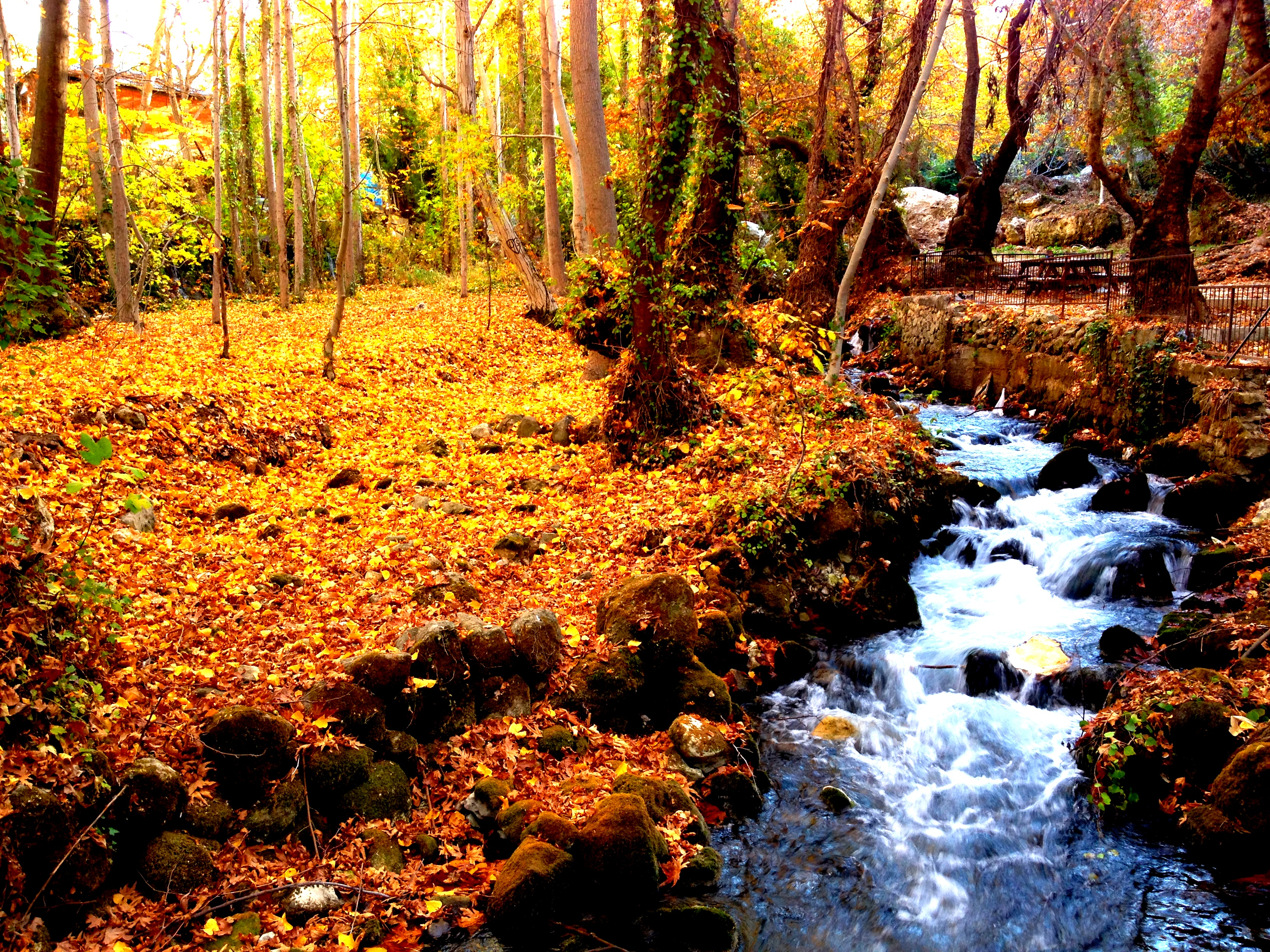
Yaylapazarı, Ermenek

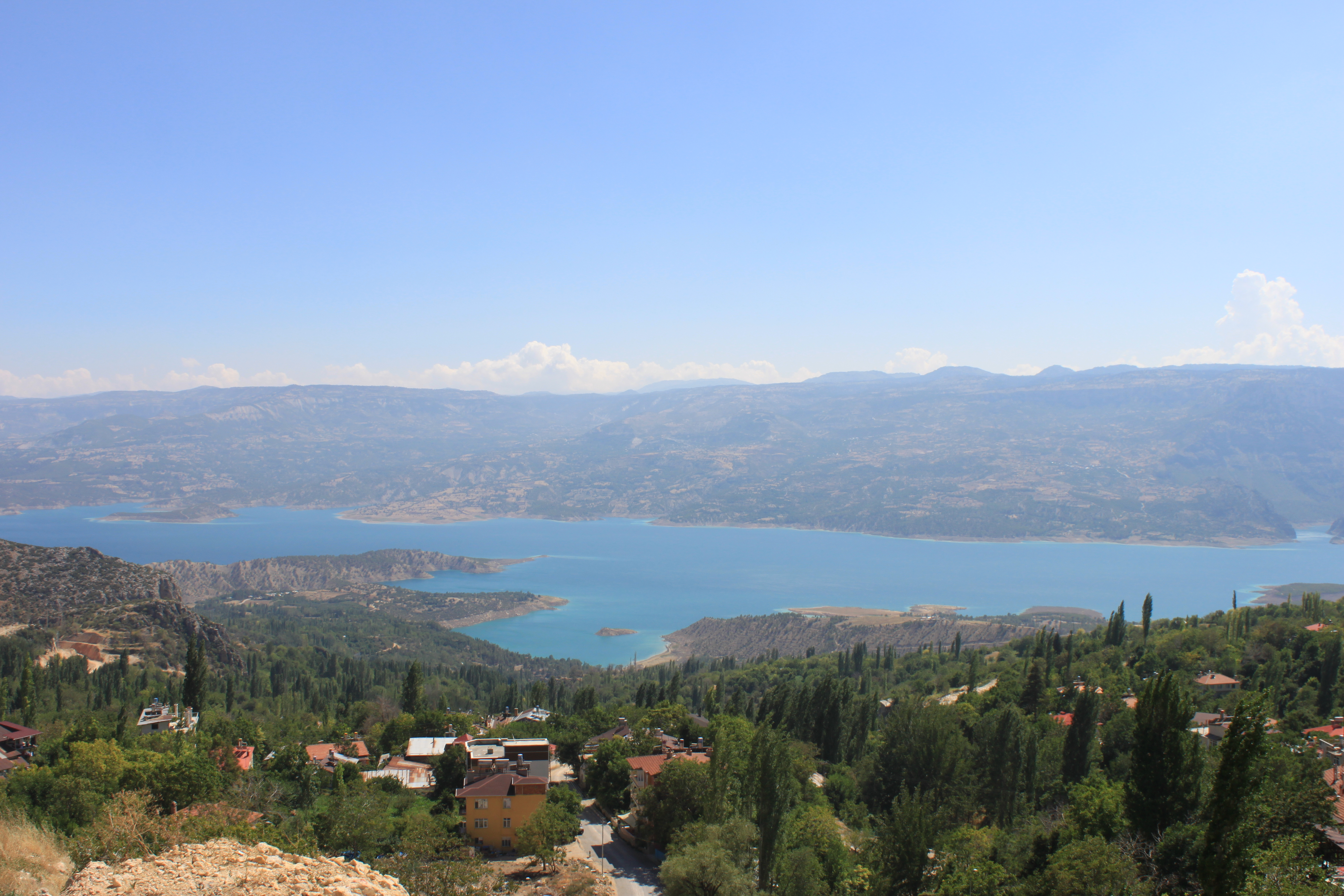
Ermenek Dam

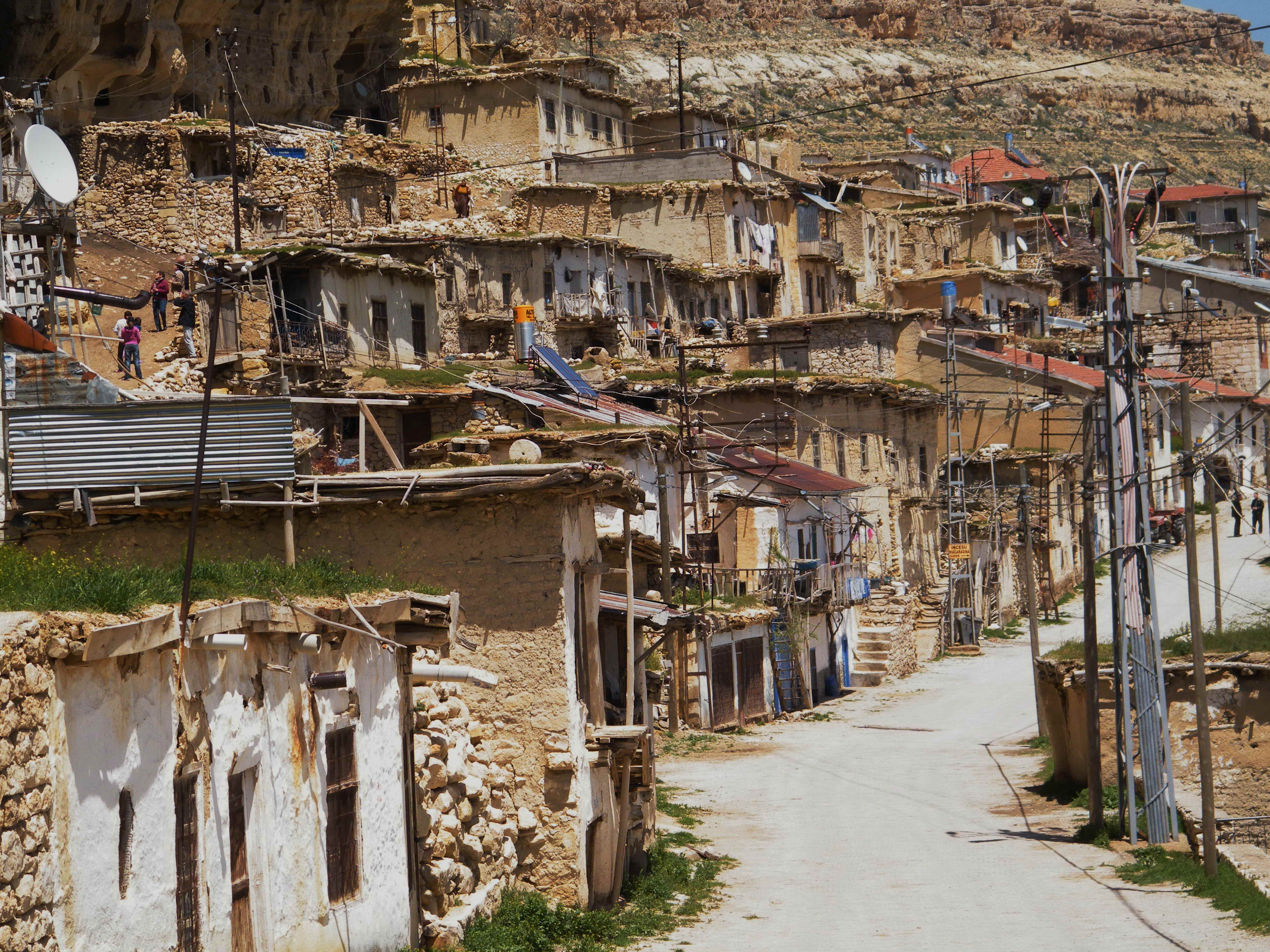
Houses in Taşkale

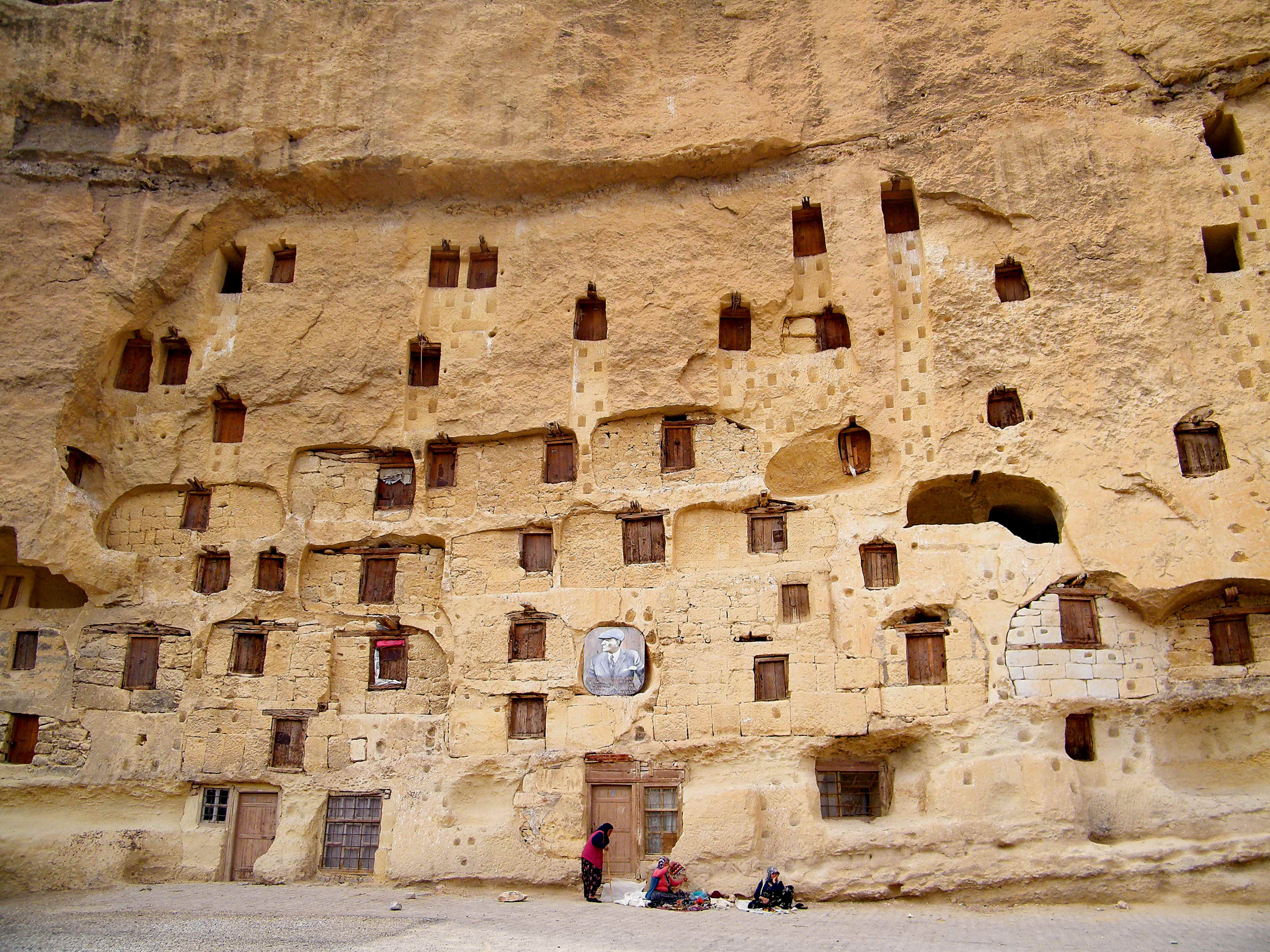
Storage caves of Taşkale are probably of ancient origin, but some may have been dug into the rock face in the post-Byzantine period.

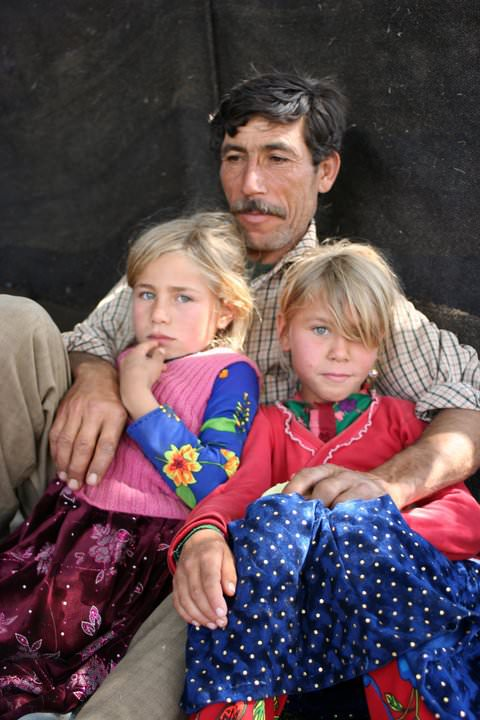
A Yörük father with his daughter and son in Balkusan, Karaman Province

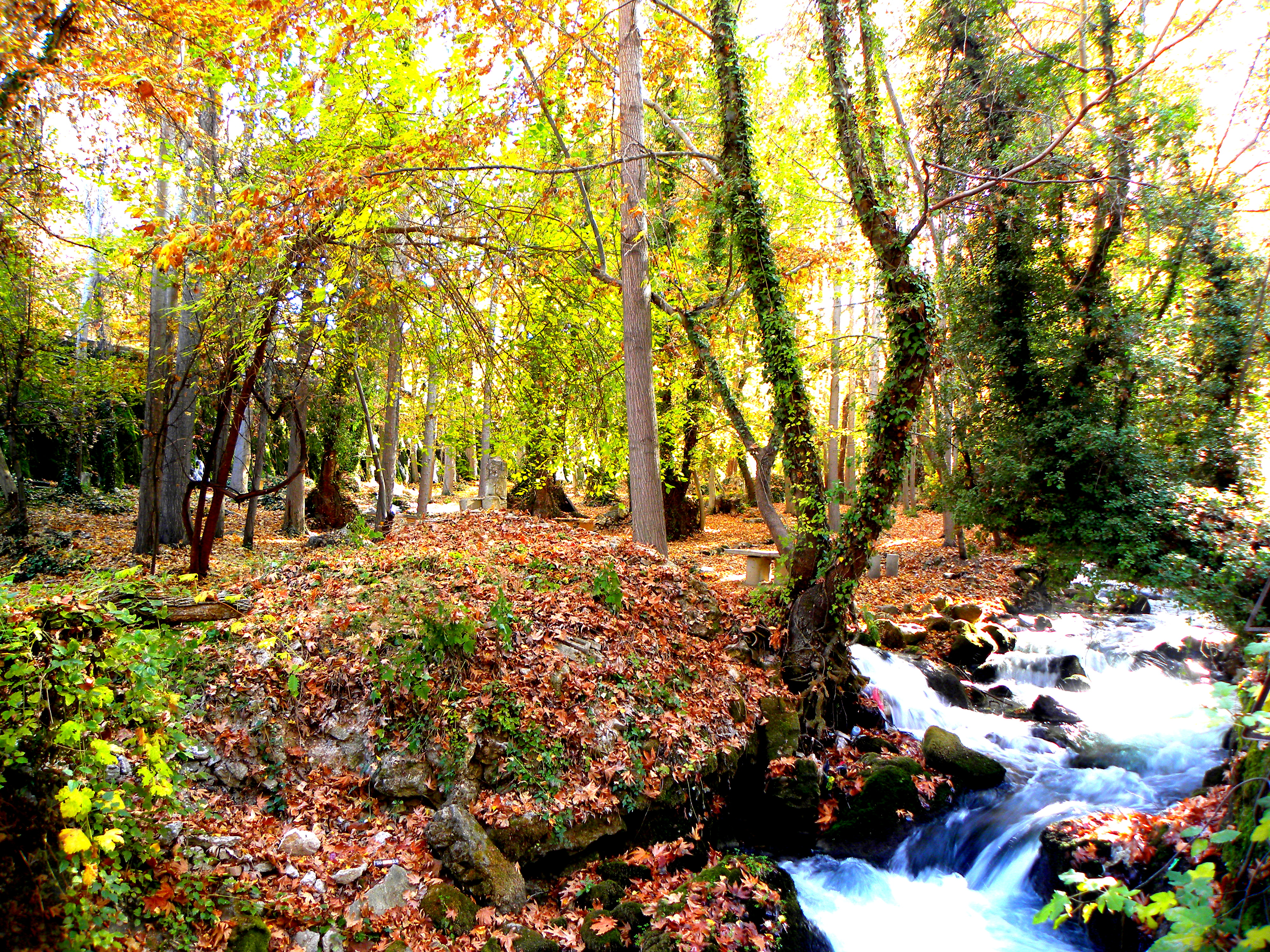
Yaylapazarı, Ermenek

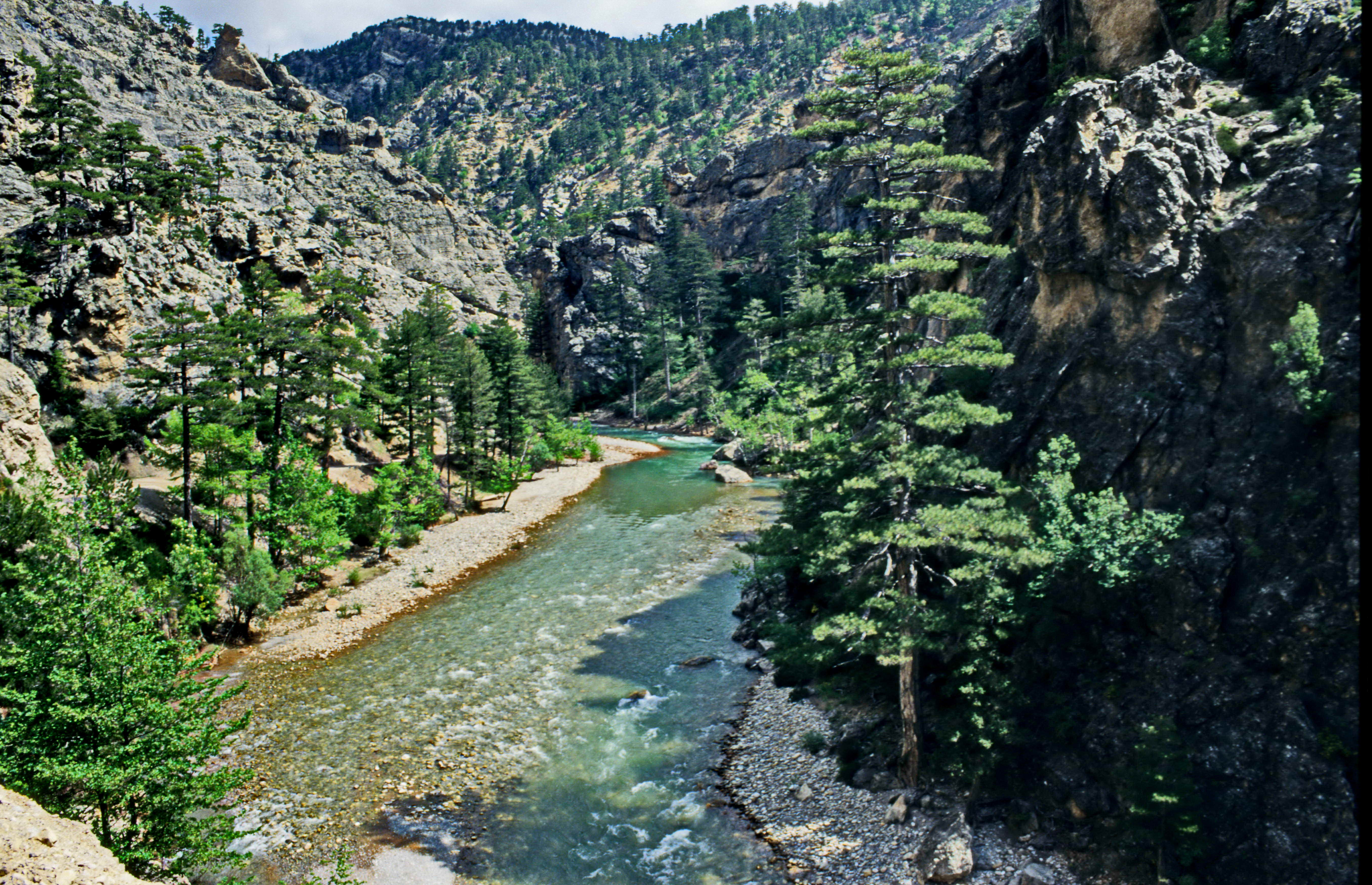
Taşeli-Plateau Oberer Ermenek Stream Gökdere Stream

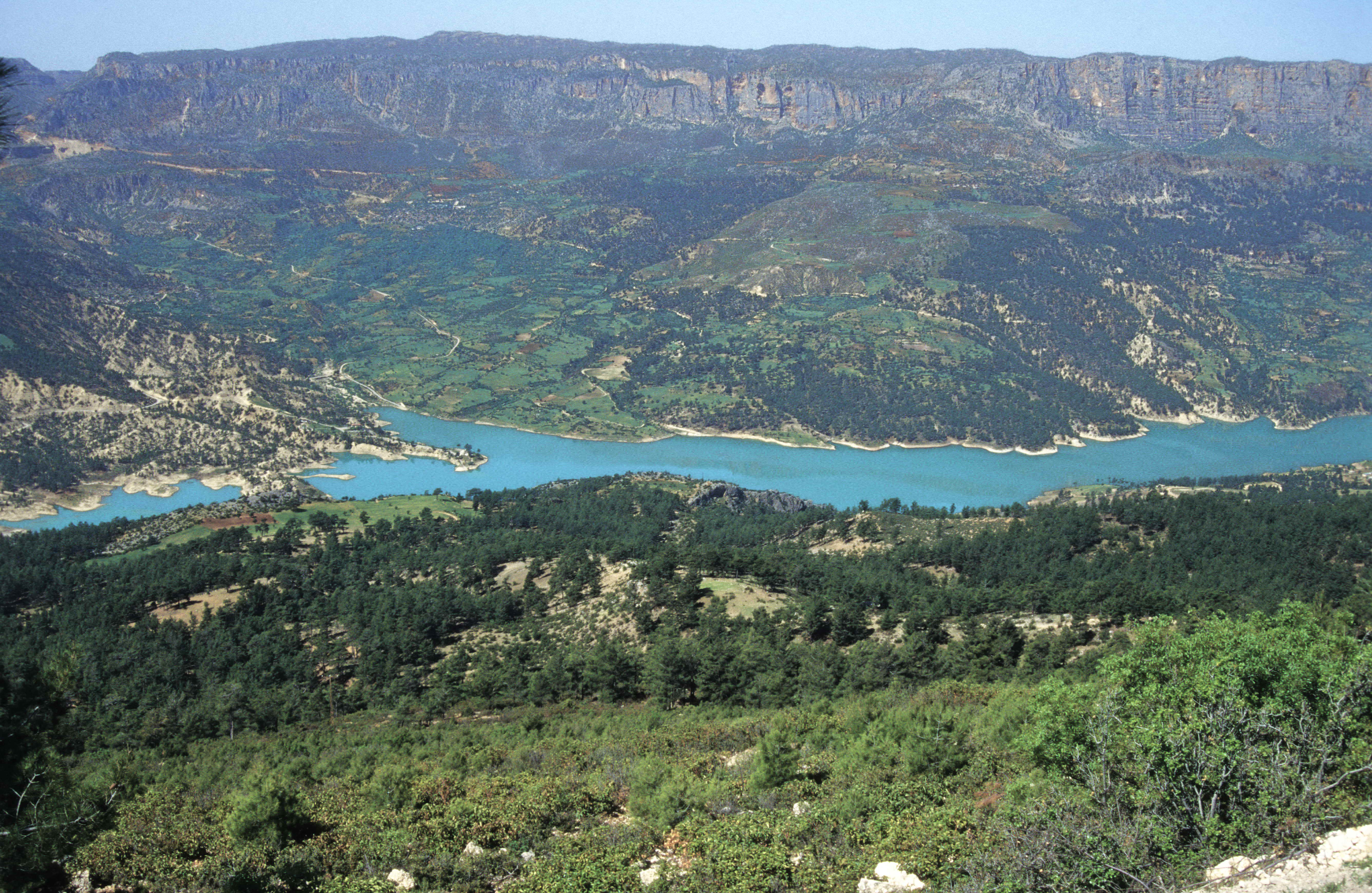
Taşeli-Plateau Gezende Dam

== See also ==
- Karaman Eyalet
