= Işıkkale =

Archaeological site in Turkey

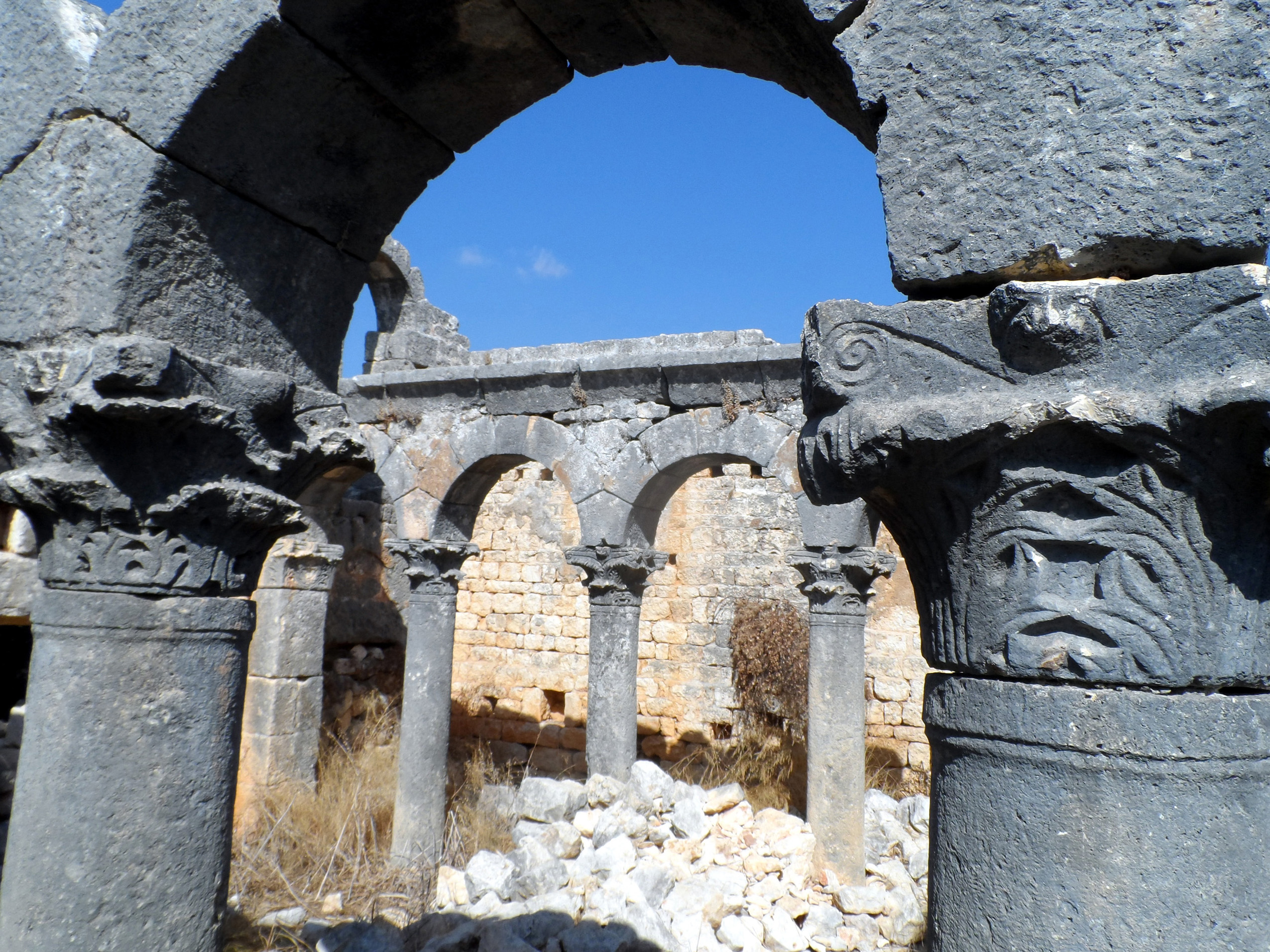
- Ruins of a basilica in Işıkkale

- Location within Turkey
- 36°26′22″N 34°00′35″E
- Type: Ancient settlement
- Periods: Hellenistic Age to Byzantine Empire
- Location: Silifke, Mersin Province, Turkey
- Region: Mediterranean Region

Işıkkale (meaning the "castle of light") is an ancient settlement in Turkey.

Işıkkale is located at 36°26′22″N 34°00′35″E in the rural area of Silifke ilçe (district) of Mersin Province. Işıkkale was established in the Taurus Mountains. Its distance from Silifke is 17 kilometres (11 mi) and from Mersin is 77 kilometres (48 mi). Işıkkale is between two other archaeologically important sites; Karakabaklı and Sinekkale.

The visitors follow the Turkish state highway D-400 which runs in parallel to Mediterranean Sea coast. 1 kilometre (0.62 mi) west of Atakent, the visitors turn to north for about 6 kilometres (3.7 mi). The settlement is situated on both sides of the road.

The original name of the settlement is not known. It dates back to Hellenistic, Roman and the early Byzantine ages. There are many buildings, cisterns, wineries, and olive oil presses. In most of the buildings polygonal masonry is used . But there are also buildings of a later era such as a three-nave basilica.
