= Sinekkale =

Archaeological site in Turkey

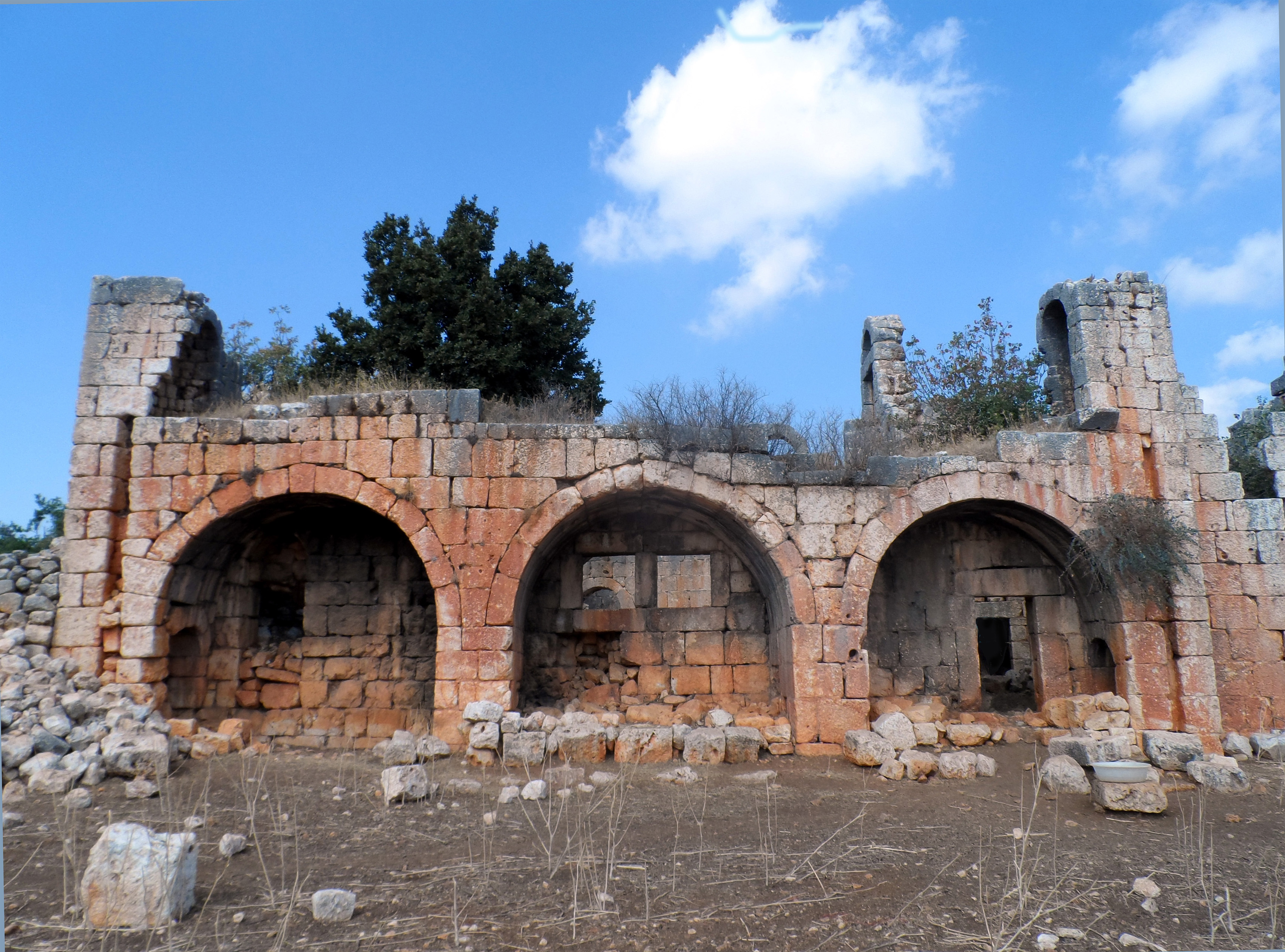

- Location within Turkey
- 36°26′23″N 34°00′35″E
- Type: Villa rustica
- Periods: Roman Empire to Byzantine Empire
- Location: Silifke, Mersin Province, Turkey
- Region: Mediterranean Region

Site notes
- Length: 24 metres (79 ft)
- Width: 21 metres (69 ft)
- Archaeologists: Semavi Eyice-Ina Eichner

Sinekkale (literally "The castle of flies") is an archaeological site where the architectural remains of a large villa rustica have been identified in Turkey. The original name is unknown.

== Location ==
Sinekkale is located in the rural area of Silifke ilçe (district) of Mersin Province. Its distance from Silifke is 20 kilometres (12 mi) and from Mersin is 80 kilometres (50 mi). Sinekkale lies to the north of some other sites of archaeological importance such as Karakabaklı and Işıkkale. The visitors follow the Turkish state highway D.400 which runs parallel to the Mediterranean Sea coast. About 1 kilometre (0.62 mi) west of Atakent the visitors turn north for about 10 kilometres (6.2 mi). The last stretch of the route 500 metres (1,600 ft) is inaccessible by motor vehicles and the visitors have to walk through the bushy area.

== History ==
The building is a typical Roman or Early Byzantine building. But there is a symbol of the Hellenistic Olba Kingdom carved on the lintel of one of the auxiliary buildings. The first description and a plan of Sinekkale were prepared in the early 1970s by Turkish art historian Semavi Eyice. Friedrich Hild, Hansgerd Hellenkemper, Gilbert Dagron, and Olivier Callot also visited the site and recently Ina Eichner made the most accurate description of the house.

== The building ==
The east-to-west dimension of the villa is 24 metres (79 ft) and the north-to-east dimension is 21 metres (69 ft).It is a two-story building. There are five rooms on the ground floor and six rooms on the first (mostly demolished) floor. There are visible consoles on the first floor which once supported a balcony. The house has a cistern, two bathing rooms and a toilet.
