= Mount Karadağ =

Mountain in Central Anatolia, Turkey

Karadağ
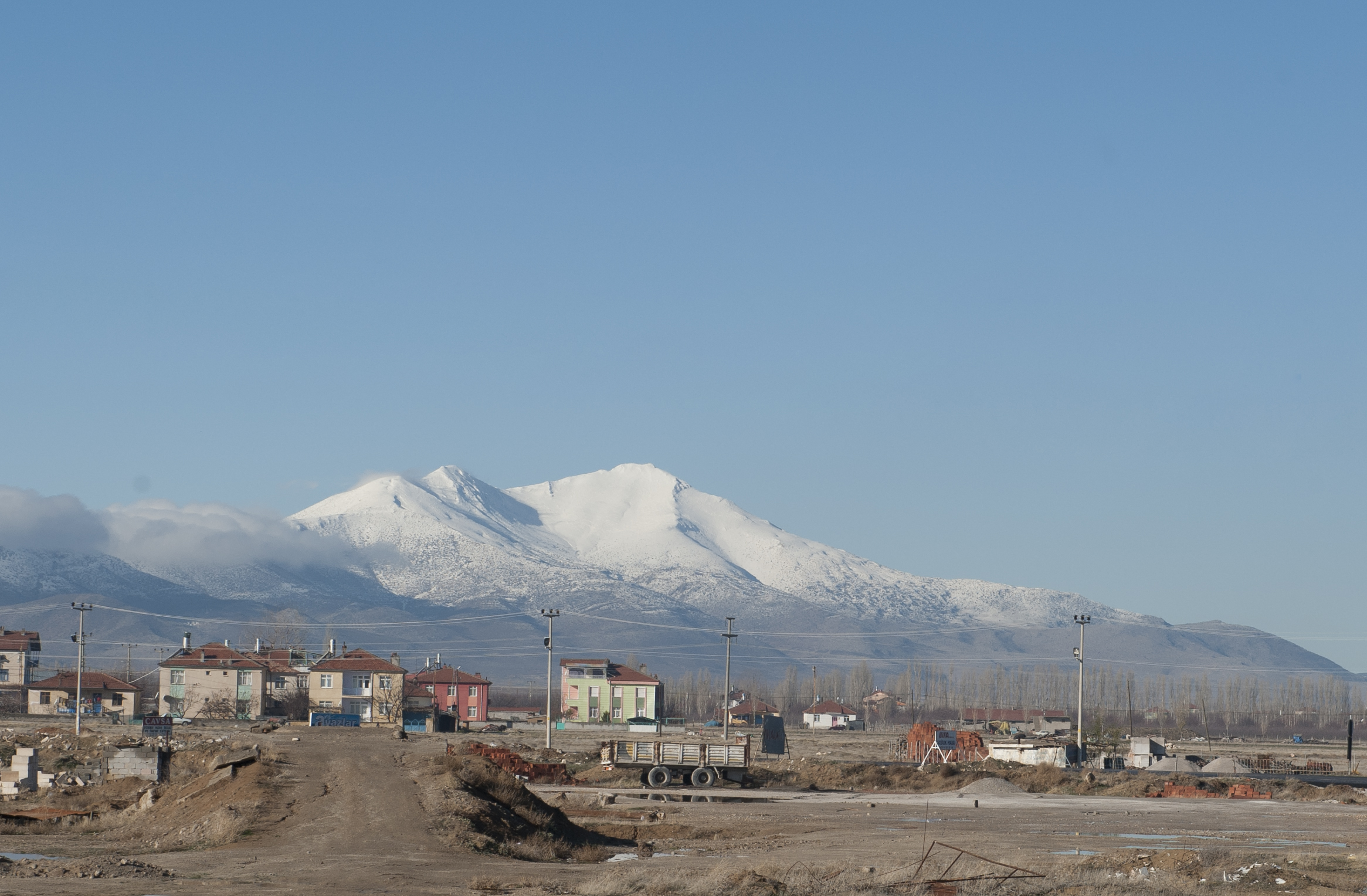
- Snow-capped Karadağ viewed from a village

Highest point
- Elevation: 2,288 m (7,507 ft); See Geography section
- Coordinates: 37°23′58″N 33°08′47″E

Geography
- Location within Turkey
- Location: Karaman, Turkey
- Region: Central Anatolia Region

Geology
- Mountain type: Caldera
- Last eruption: Unknown

Karadağ (literally: Black mountain) is an extinct volcano in Karaman Province, Turkey. The mountain, which was heavily inhabited in the Hittite and Byzantine periods, is now used mostly for telecommunications, but many historical structures are still visible.

== Geography ==
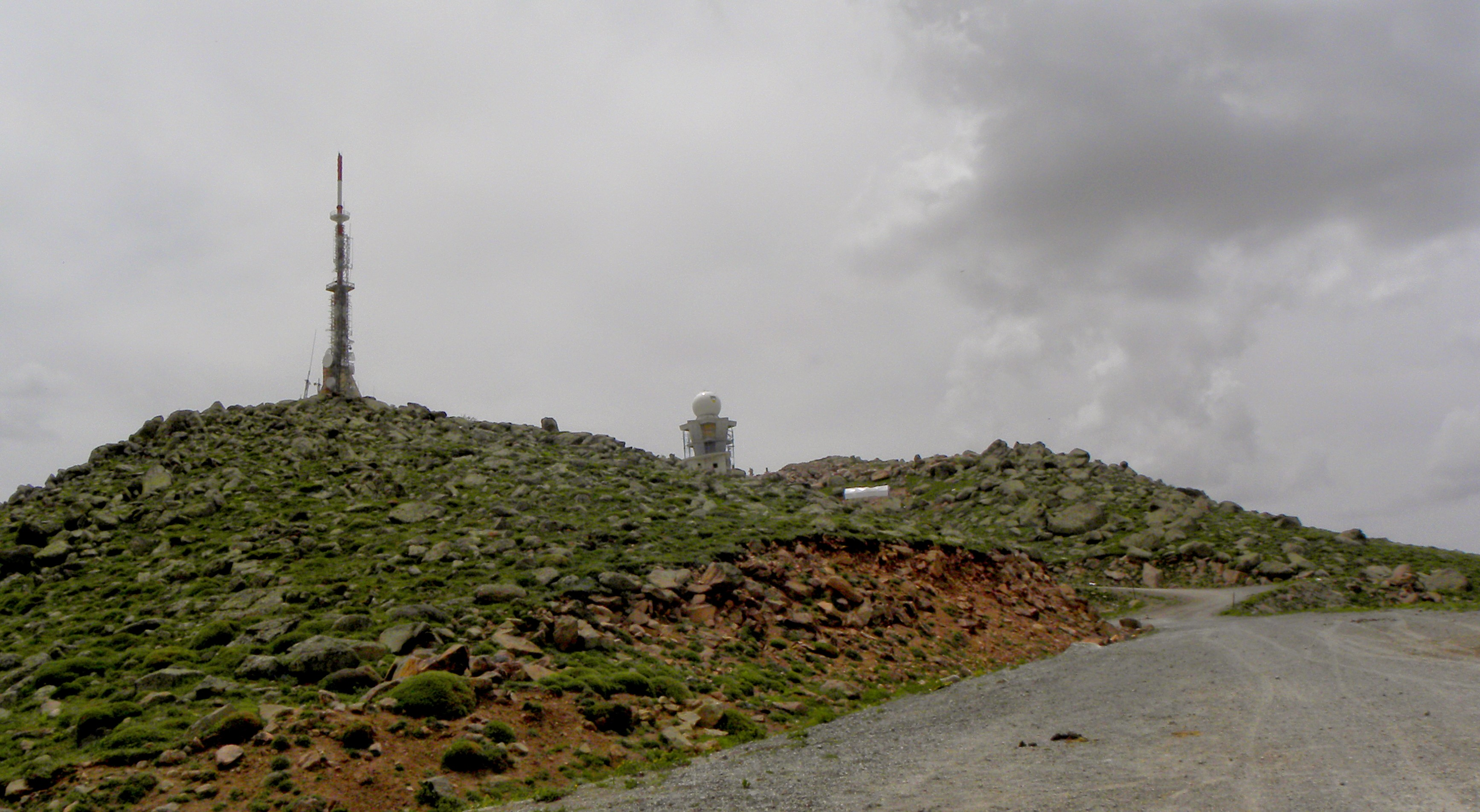
A transmitter station and a Doppler weather radar at the peak of Karadağ

The Karadağ volcano rises between the Çumra lowlands and the Hotamış marsh. The Mahalaç Peak is its highest point, at 2,288 m (7,507 ft). The caldera, the Uluçukur caldera, has a diameter of 2 km (1.2 mi) to 1.5 km (0.93 mi) with a depth of 150 m (490 ft). Surrounding the caldera are lava domes. The volcanic complex covers around 600 km^{2}.

=== Route to mountain ===
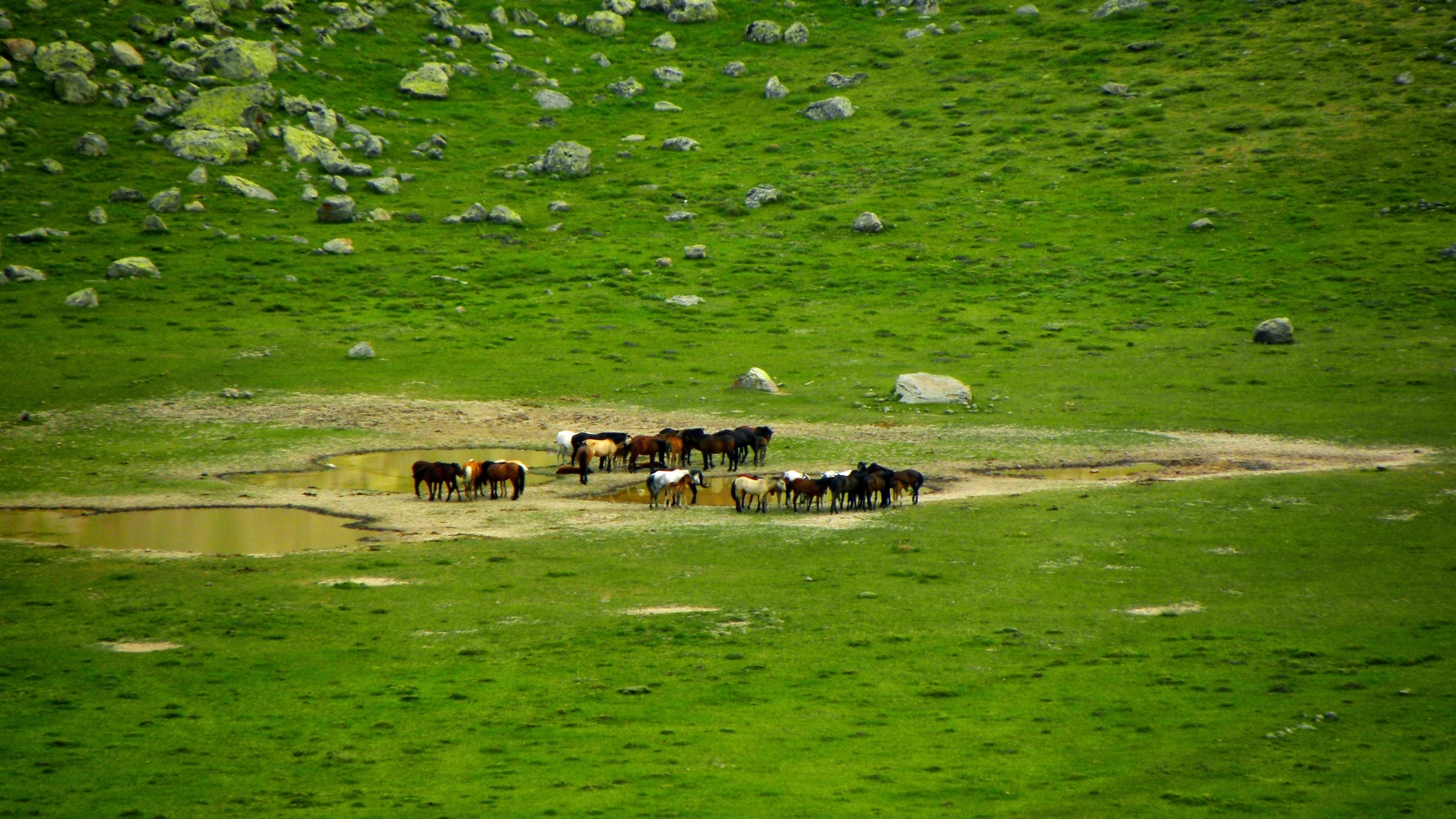
A herd of feral horses in the caldera drinking water from a lake

The mountain is accessible by car. Departing from Karaman, along the Karaman-Kılbasan road, making a left turn after passing Kılbasan will lead you to the mountain. Buildings of official institutions being located in the peak makes it easier to access the crater. The historical road is thought to be near the current road.

== Flora and fauna ==
The region is home to around 250 wild horses and many feral sheep.

The mountain Karadağ is located near the Mediterranean Sea, which means its climate is a mix of Mediterranean and continental climate. Due to this, the area is mostly covered by maquis. However, there are also some endemic plants, including the Astragalus vestitus.

== Geologic history ==
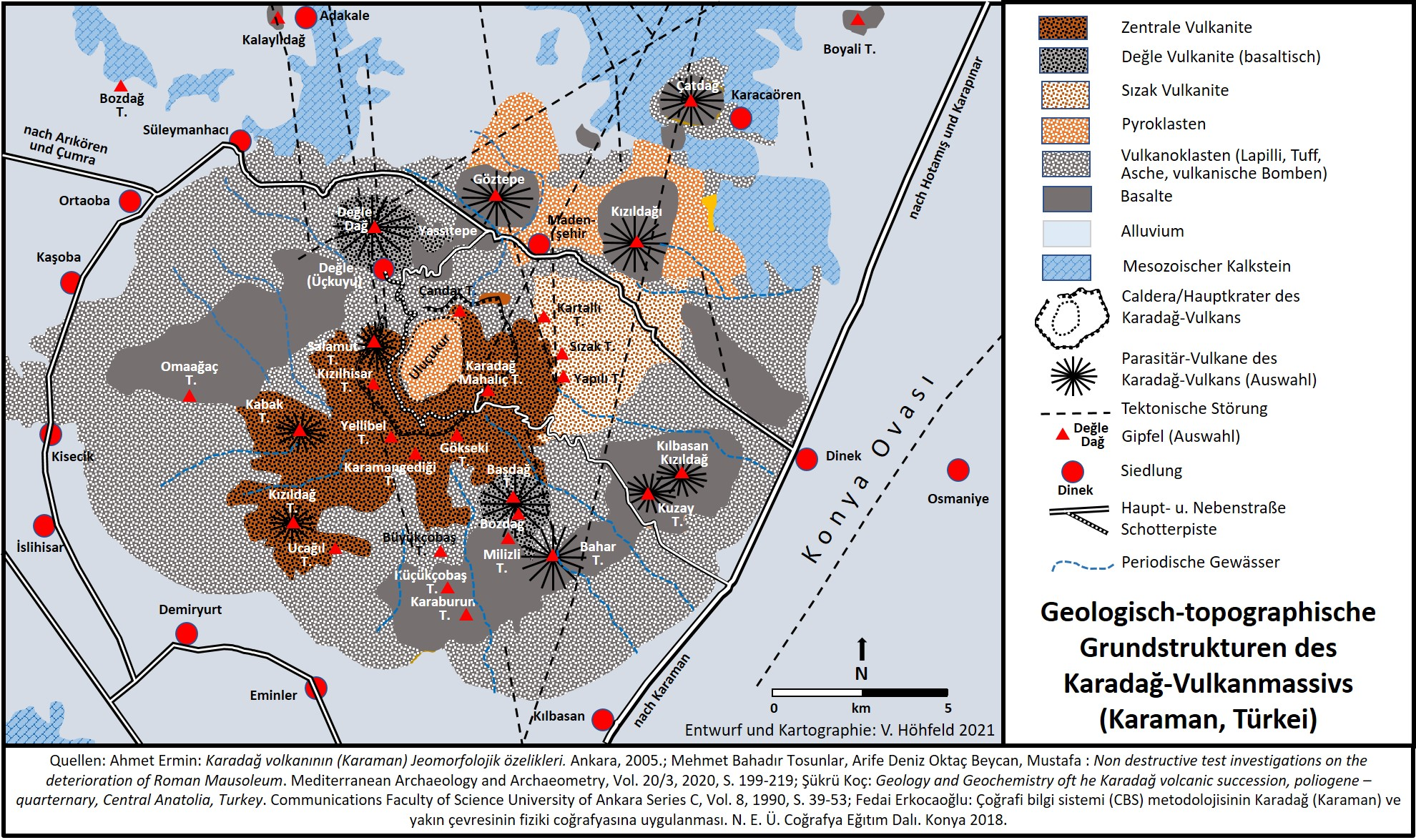
A geomorphologic map of Karadağ (in German)

Volcanic activity in this volcano occurred in 4 phases. It started at the end of Pliocene and continued until the end of Pleistocene. The oldest materials (around 2.3 million years old). The following volcanics have an age of around 1.95-2.05 million years old, which can be found in Kızıldağ, a cinder cone in the northeast of the main mountain. Later activity at the summit resulted in the creation of a caldera 1.1 million years ago. With these eruptions, andesites, tuffs, pumicites and formations of breccia were observed. In the north flank of the caldera, within the tuffs base surge sediments are visible. In the last period, the 4th period, near Madenşehri, younger andesite rocks were found. Older Neogene rocks were also found, consisting of conglomerates, limestones and sandstones in the area of the caldera.

=== Caldera formation ===
Before the eruption which caused a caldera to form, the extrusion of slags, volcanic ash and debris was occurring. A lava flow covered the vent, which forced the pressure of the gas from the magma chamber to pile up and caused a large explosion, leaving a caldera behind. Pyroclastic flows were generated, the most effective being in the north flank. 2.5–4 m (8.2–13.1 ft) of pumice layers underground were found near Madenşehri as a result of the eruption.

== History ==
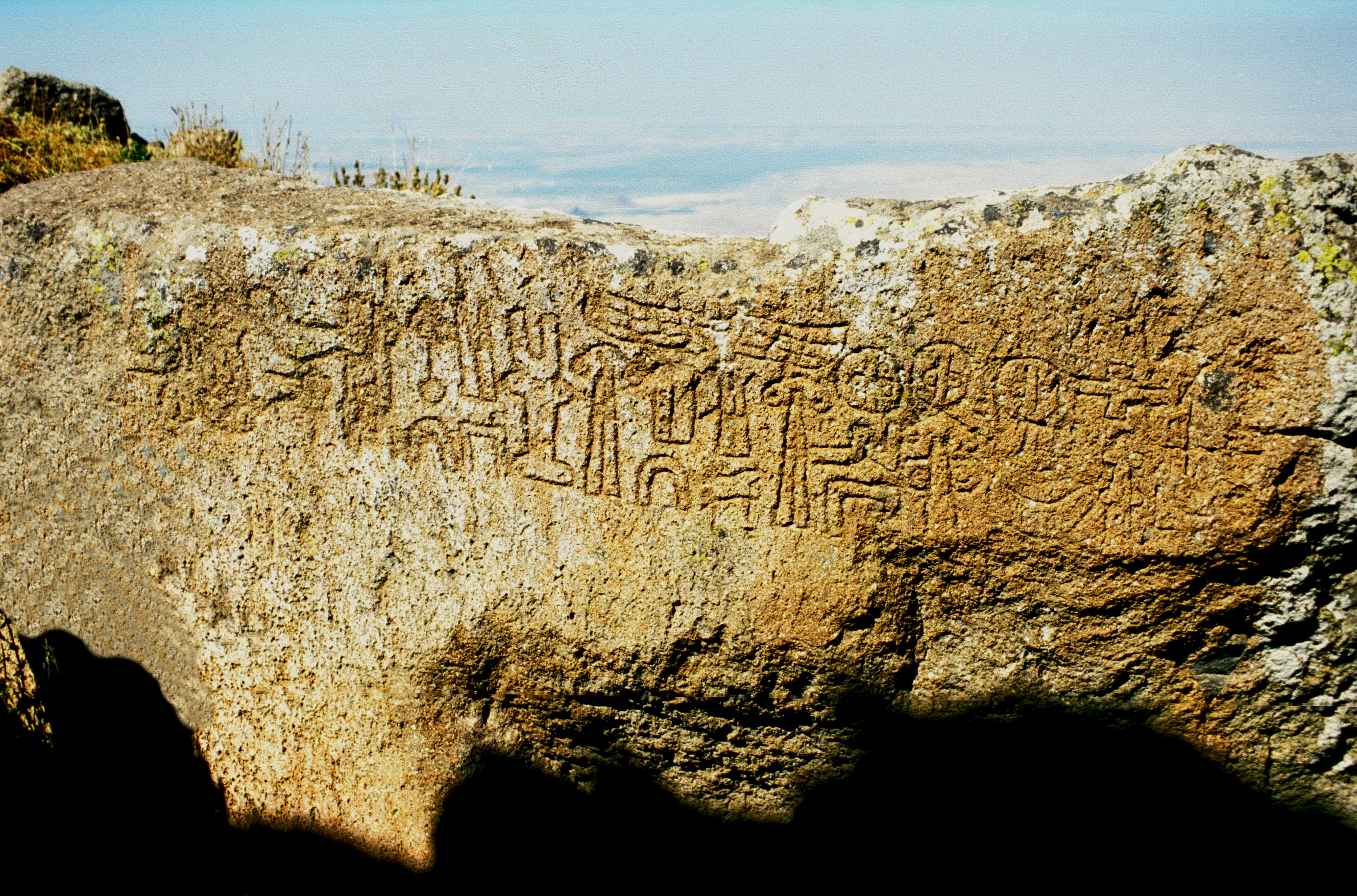
Luwian hieroglyphs on a rock at the peak of the mountain

The slopes of the volcano have always been inhabited. Çatalhöyük (ca 7500 BC), one of the earliest neolithic settlements in Anatolia, is located at the north-west of the volcano, and there are Hittite inscriptions on the hills at the south-east of the mountain, belonging to a Great King Hartapu. The mountain was called Boratinon in late antiquity. Ancient Derbe, which is one of the towns Paul the Apostle had visited, is situated on the east slopes of the mountain. During the early ages of Christianity, the towns on the mountain were religious centers. There are ruins of early Byzantine settlements all around the mountain and the region is called Binbirkilise (English: Thousand and One Churches). Madenşehri ruins are situated to the north of the crater. However, after Christianity was well established in big cities, the settlements on the mountain lost their religious importance.

== Gallery ==
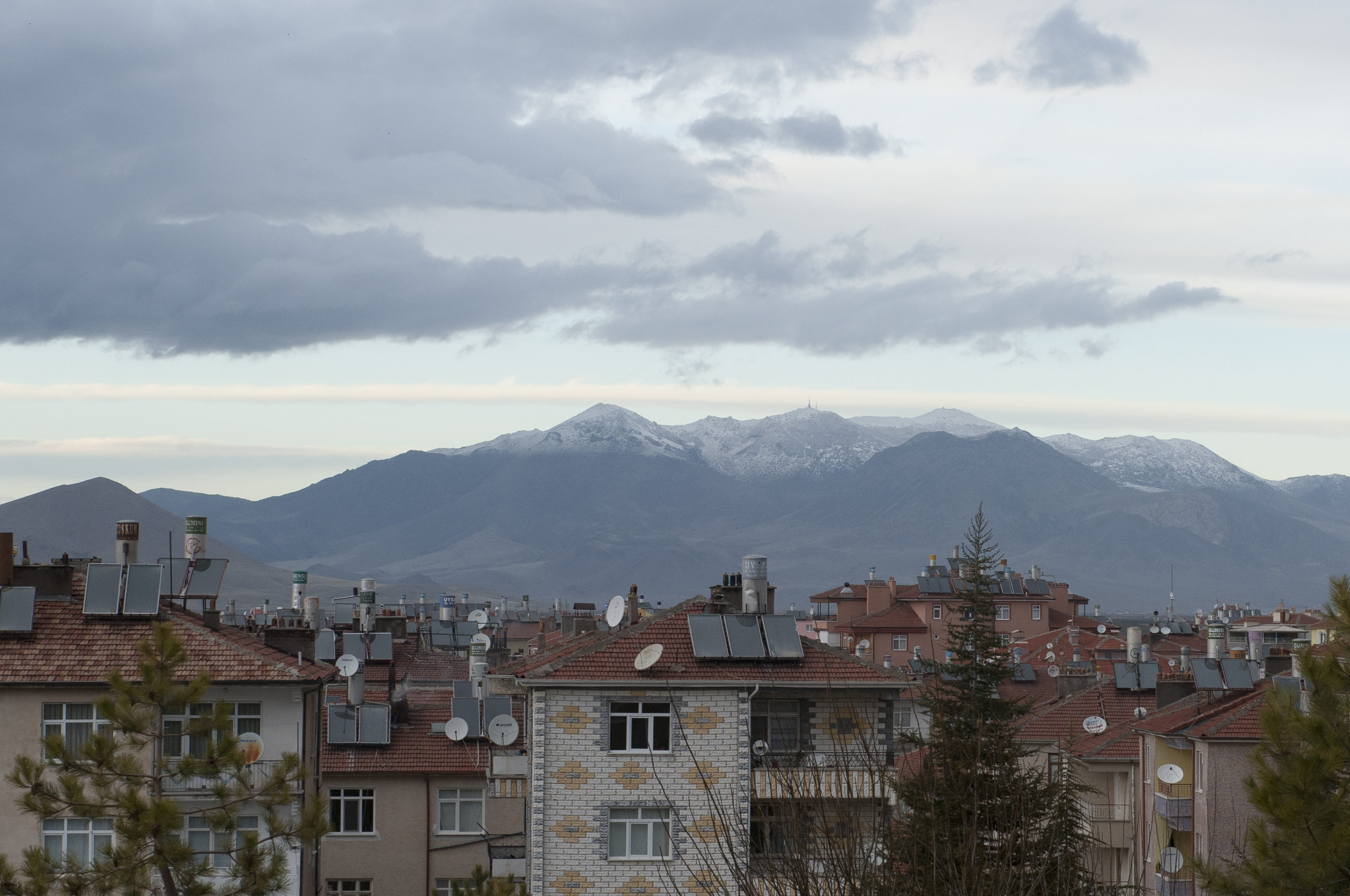
Karadağ viewed from Karaman

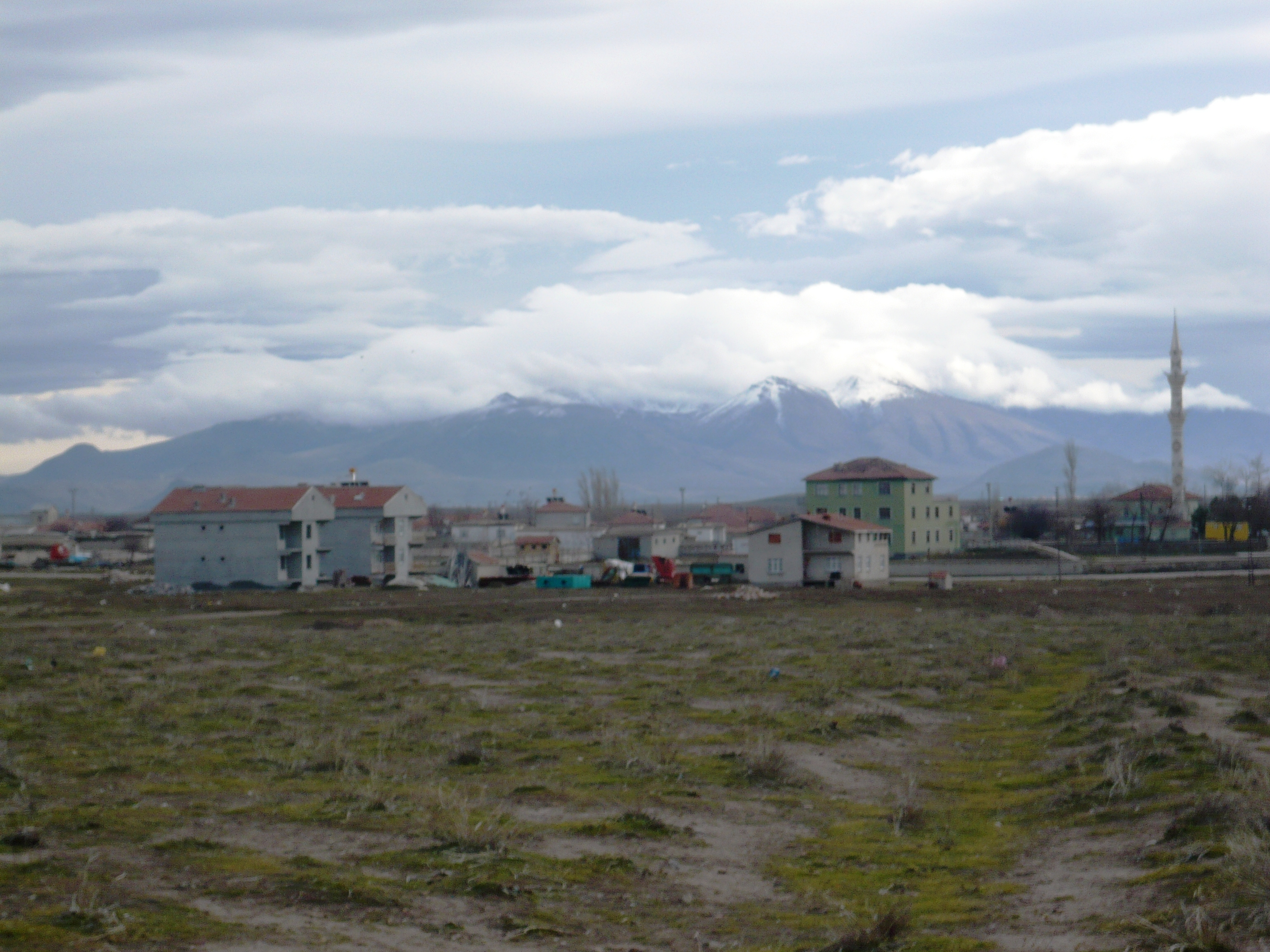
Karadağ viewed from Çumra while the summit is covered by clouds

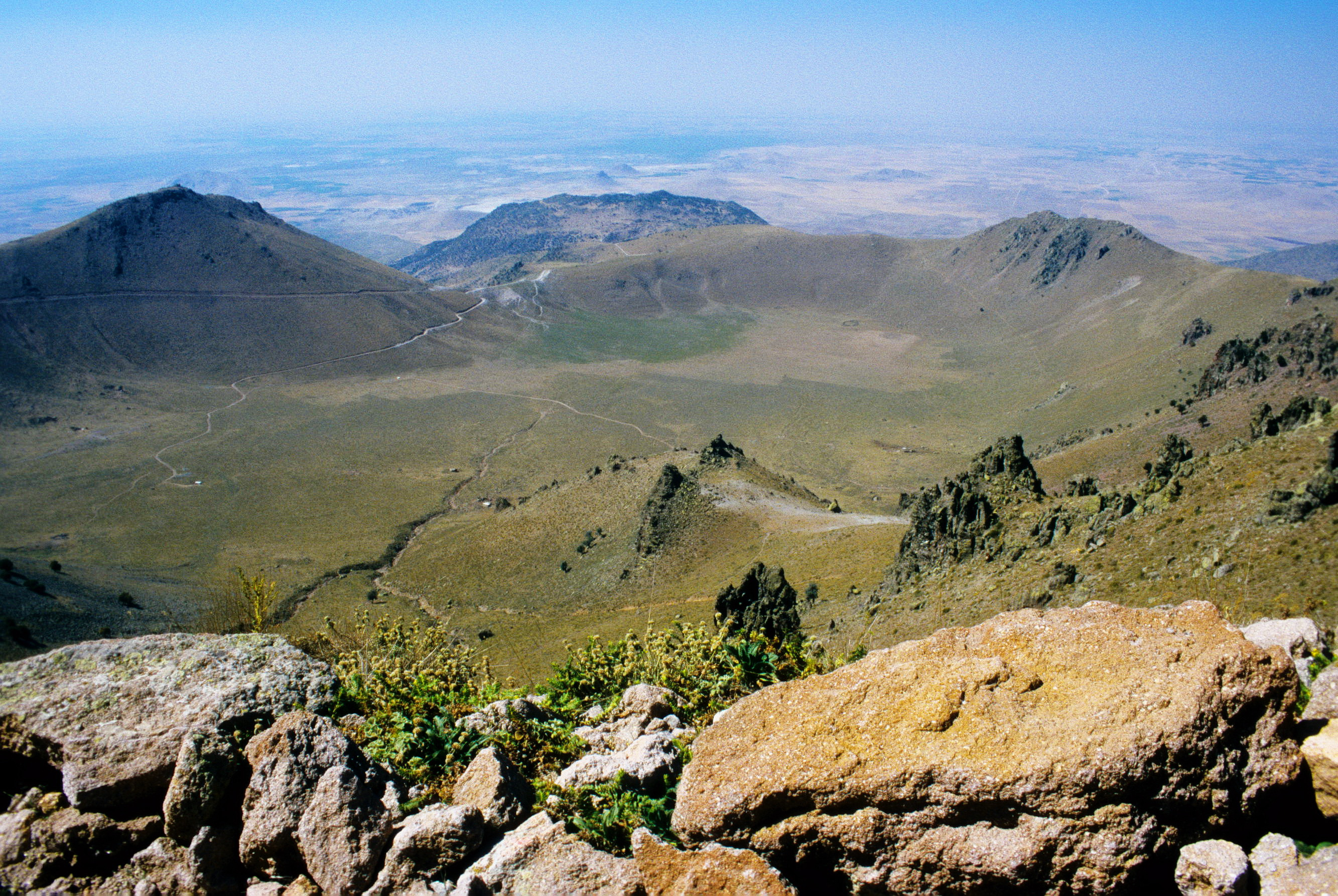
The Uluçukur caldera, viewed from the south

== See also ==
- List of volcanoes in Turkey
- Mountains of Turkey
- Kılbasan
