= Sekbanbaşı Mosque =

Former mosque in Istanbul, Turkey

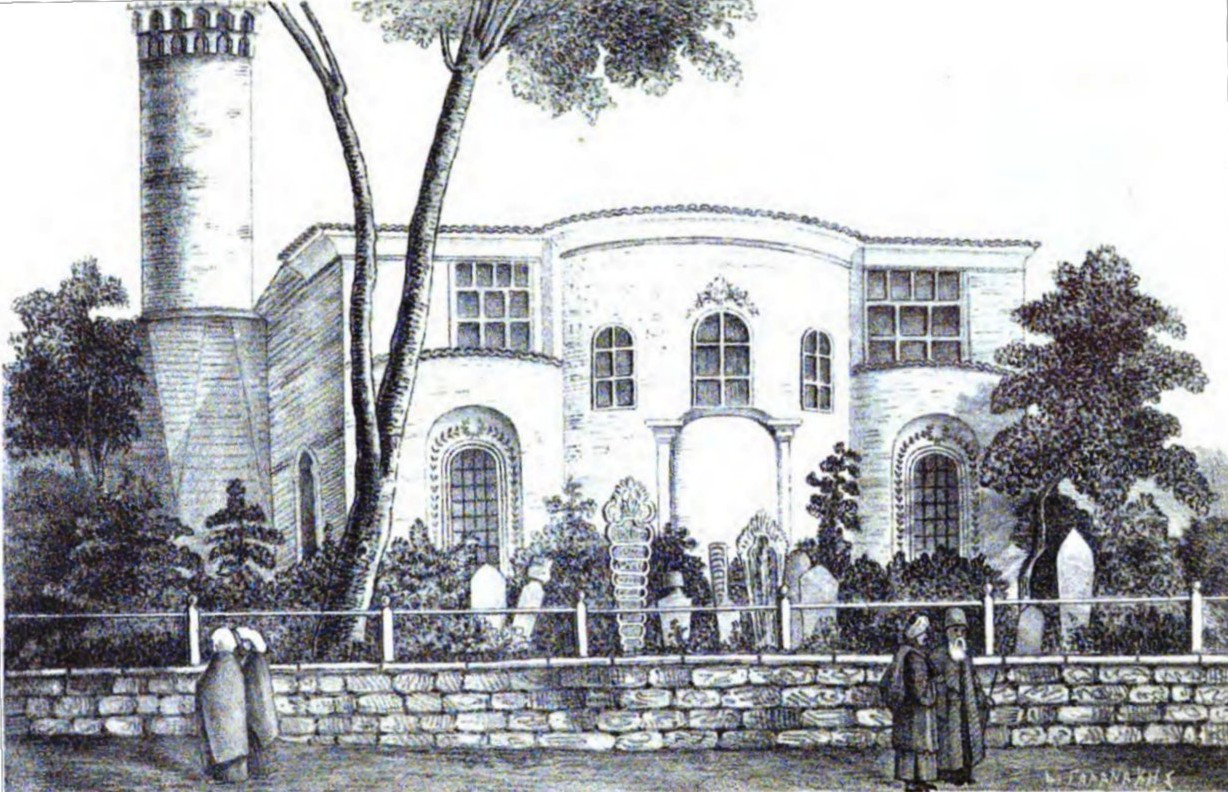
The mosque in 1877

Sekbanbaşı Mosque was a mosque located in the Ottoman capital of Constantinople (modern-day Istanbul). It was originally a Byzantine church. According to the writings of Hafiz Hüseyin al-Ayvansarayî (Hadîkatü’l-cevâmi‘), the original Byzantine church had been converted by İbrahim Ağa (died 1496–7), the lieutenant of the Ottoman sekban regiments (sekbanbaşı). The building was located in Kendir Sokağı, in the Kırkçeşme quarter (Fatih district), near the ancient aqueduct of Roman Emperor Valens.

In 1838, the mosque was damaged by a fire, but underwent some restorations. In 1918, during the final few years of the Ottoman Empire, the mosque and the surrounding neighborhood were once again hit by a fire. This time, the mosque did not undergo reparations and was gradually abandoned. The heavily damaged fundament of the mosque was then completely torn down in 1943 as the Turkish government wanted to enlarge the Atatürk Boulevard. In 1954, the soil on which the mosque stood was completely cleared as apartment blocks were being built on it. Today, nothing extant of the mosque remains. However, just prior to its complete demolition, a hurried excavation was carried out by Semavi Eyice, which unearthed some of the substructures of the Sekbanbaşı Mosque. These substructures were examined and surveyed on the spot.

== Sources ==
- Taddei, Alessandro (2021). "The Sekbanbaşı Mescidi or a Lesser-Known Middle Byzantine Church Typology at Constantinople". Eurasian Studies. 19 (1): 29–45. doi:10.1163/24685623-12340108. S2CID 245084569.
