= Tekkadın ruins =

Archaeological site in Mersin, Turkey

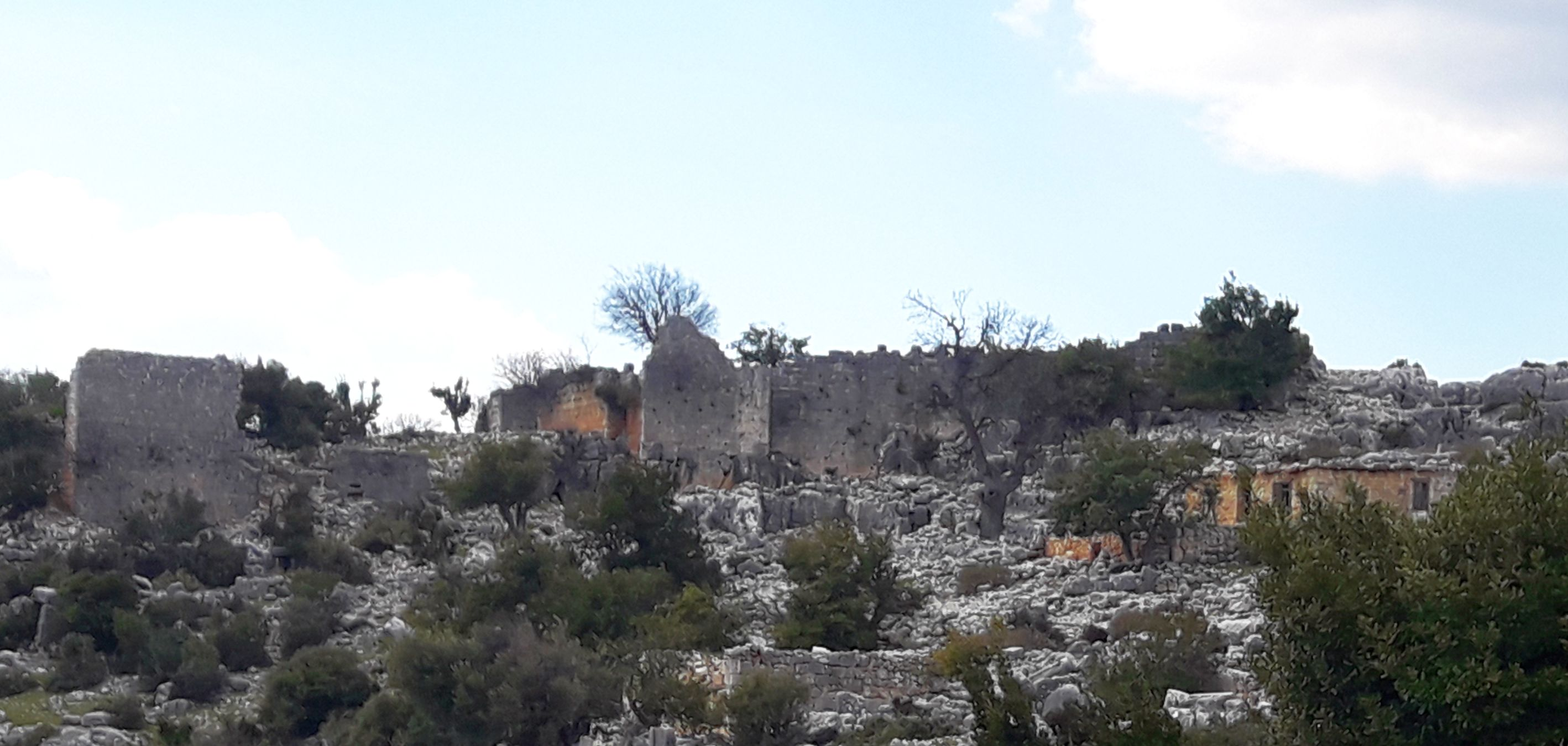
Tekkadın ruins (castle)

Tekkadın ruins are a group of ruins in Mersin Province, Turkey. The name of the ruins is a local name meaning "single woman". The original name is not known. The ruins are in the rural area of Silifke ilçe (district) of Mersin Province at 36°29′19″N 34°00′27″E. The visitors follow Turkish state highway D.400 and turn north in Atakent town. The ruins are about 11 kilometres (6.8 mi) to Atakent. Distance to Silifke is 27 kilometres (17 mi) and to Mersin is 77 kilometres (48 mi).

The ancient town was a Hellenistic town . But it continued during the Roman and early Byzantine times. Presently there is small castle as well as the ruins of a church, a number of houses, cisterns, rock tombs and sarcophagus lids.
