= Binbirkilise =

Historical region in south-central Turkey

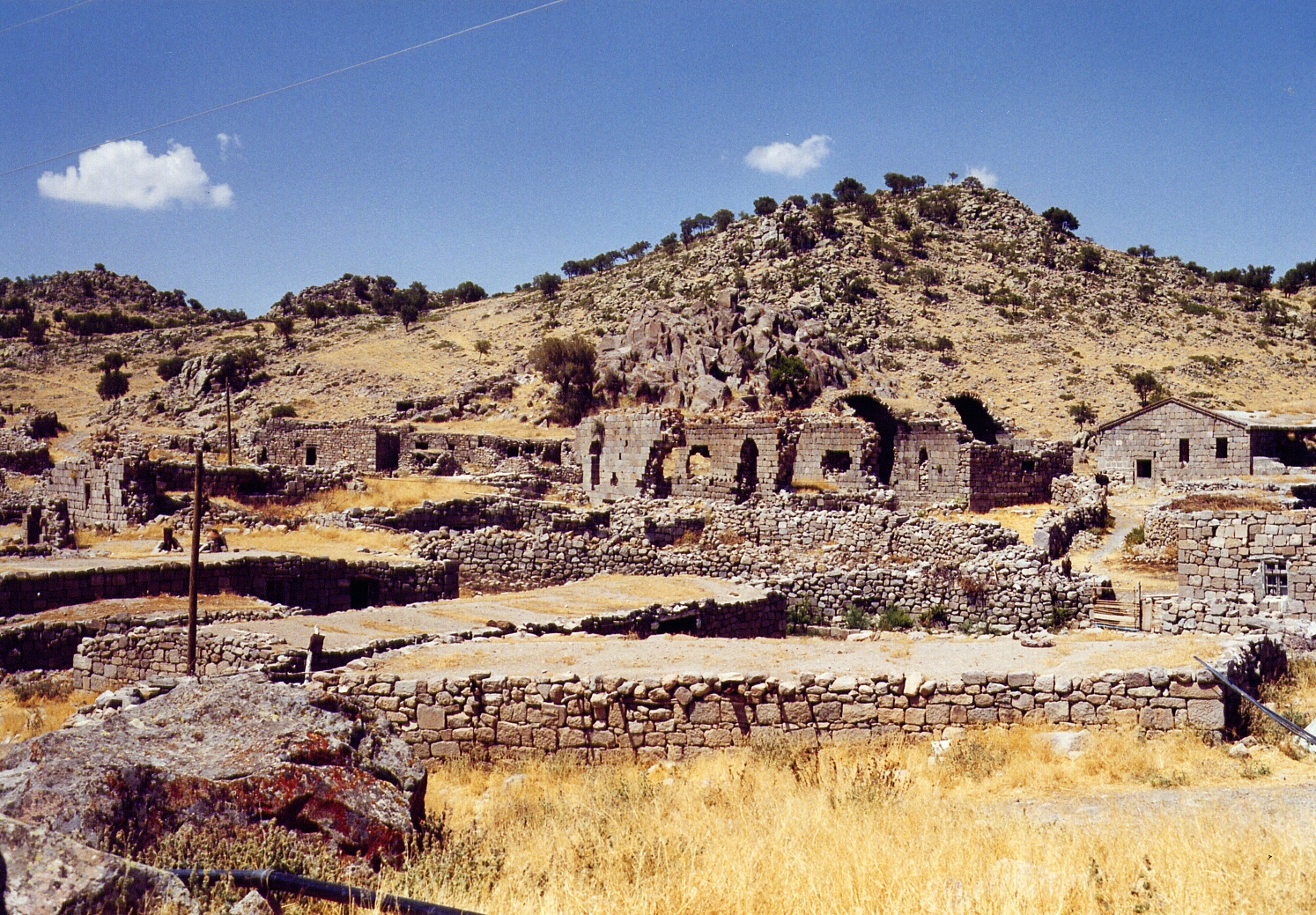
- The ruins of Binbirkilise are located in and around the modern village Madenşehri.

- Location within Turkey
- 37°26′14″N 33°08′39″E
- Location: Madenşehri, Karaman Province, Turkey
- Region: Lycaonia

History
- Built: Approximately 3rd century
- Abandoned: Approximately 8th century

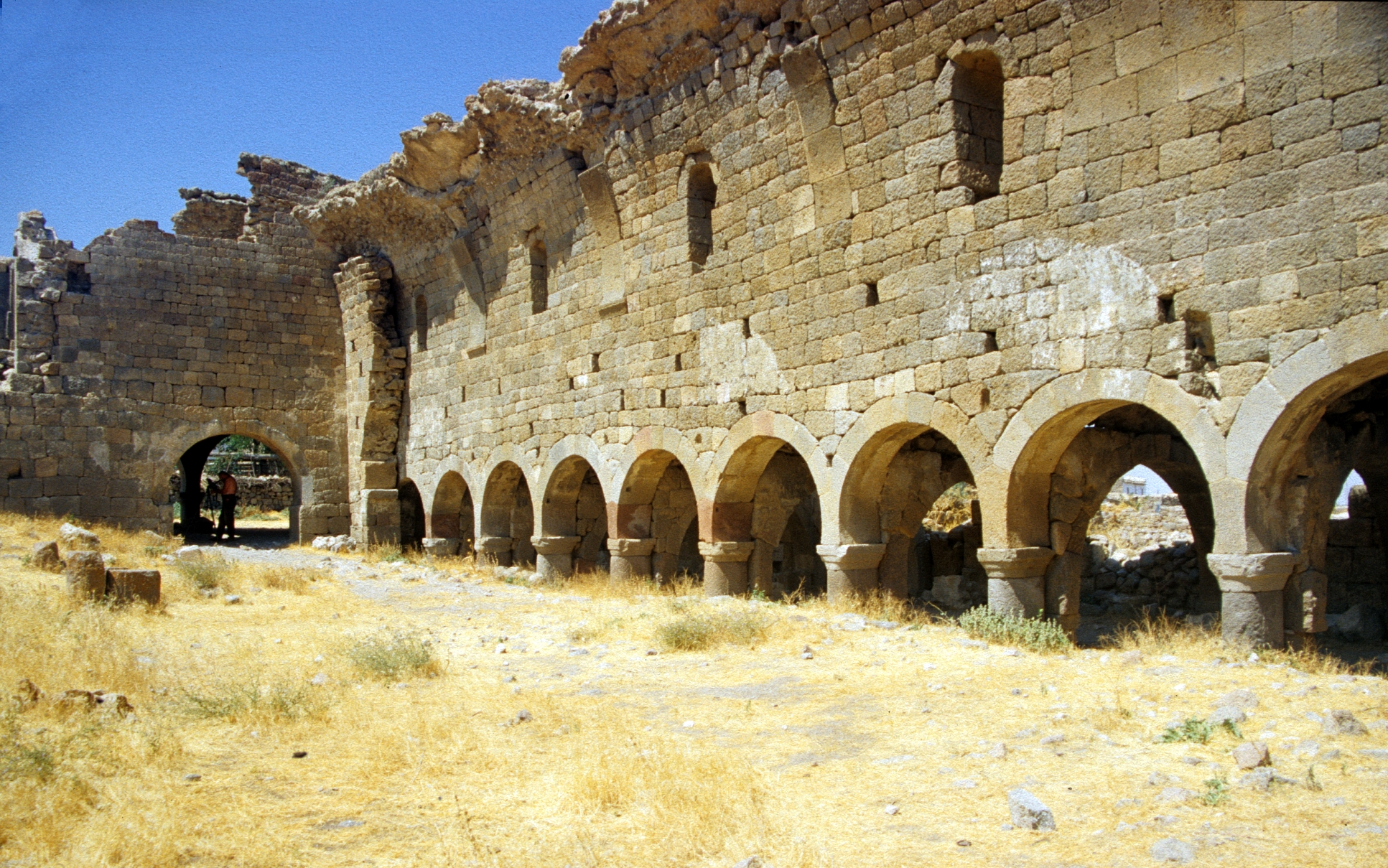
Church ruins in Madenşehri

Binbirkilise (literally: Thousand and One Churches) is a district in modern Karaman Province of Turkey, in what was the medieval region of Lycaonia known for its around fifty Byzantine church ruins.

The district is located on the northern slopes of the volcano Karadağ, around 30 km (19 mi) north of the provincial capital city of Karaman. The church ruins are situated in and around the settlements of Madenşehri, Üçkuyu and Değle.

== Buildings ==
The region was a cultural centre for the Byzantine Christians in the era between the 3rd and 8th centuries. There are remains of churches, monasteries, cisterns, fortifications and dwellings that are integrated in the villages. The stone materials were reused in today's buildings and this has caused a continuous reduction of the historical inventory.

From the architecture historical viewpoint, the several domed basilicas of Syriac Orthodox type are interesting. The walls were built of large cut stone blocks. Due to lack of wood in the region, the buildings were topped with stone domed roofs instead of flat wooden roofs. Over the aisles, matronea were constructed behind the upper column row. In the apses, there were double clerestory windows. The narthexes have mostly double arcades and are supported by a single column in the centre. In some churches, primarily in Madenşehri, remains of murals can be seen. Also rare relics from the Hittites, Roman and Hellenistic period are found in the surroundings.

== History of research work ==
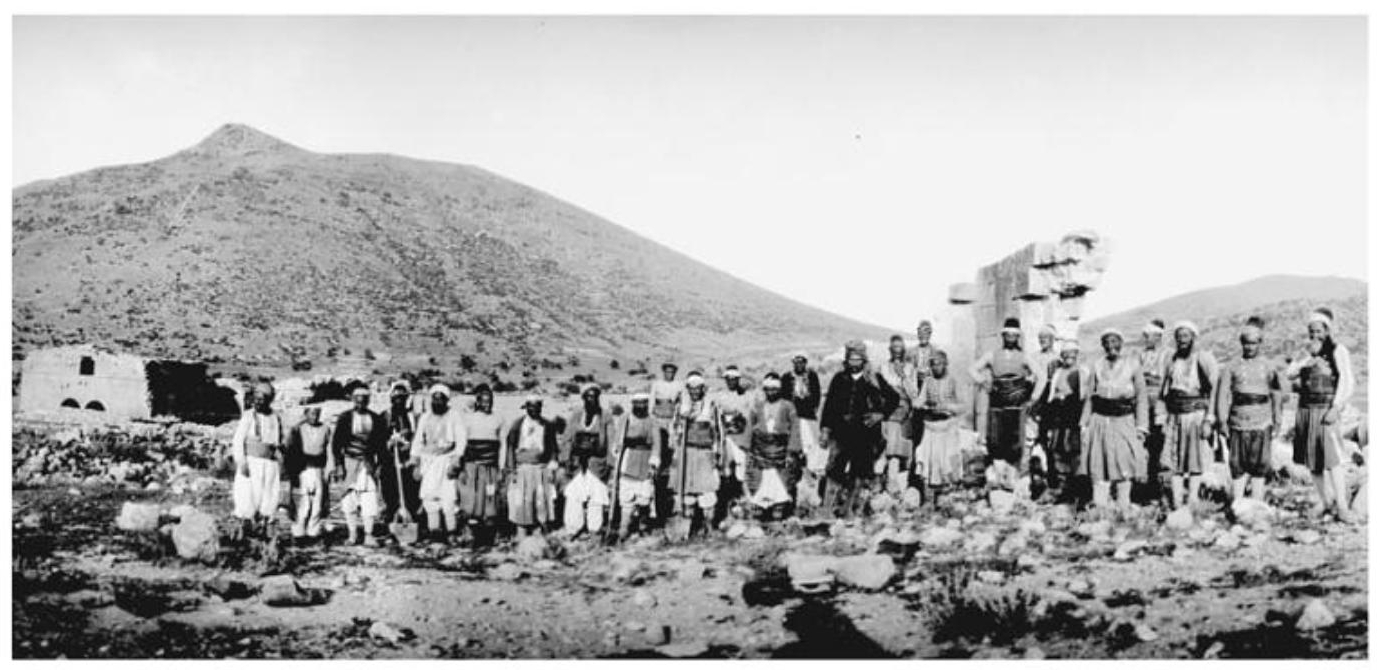
Gertrude Bell's workers at the excavations at Madenşehri in 1907

In 1904, Carl Holzmann (1849–1914) published his Archäologische Skizzen (English: Archaeological Sketches) about Binbirkilise. Shortly after, the region was described by British traveller and archaeologist Gertrude Bell (1868–1926), who explored the region in 1905 during her trip through Asia Minor. She published her observations in a series of articles in the Revue Archéologique. During this trip, she met in Konya the archaeologist William Mitchell Ramsay (1851–1939). The two decided to conduct excavations in Binbirkilise that took place in 1907. The results were published along with many photos in their book The Thousand and One Churches.

When Bell returned to the site two years later, she found that a large part of the documented buildings had disappeared as a result of robbery for cut stone. Today, the state of destruction is much advanced as can be seen in comparison with Bell's photos. Turkish art historian Semavi Eyice examined the region and published the results of his research in 1971.

== Gallery ==
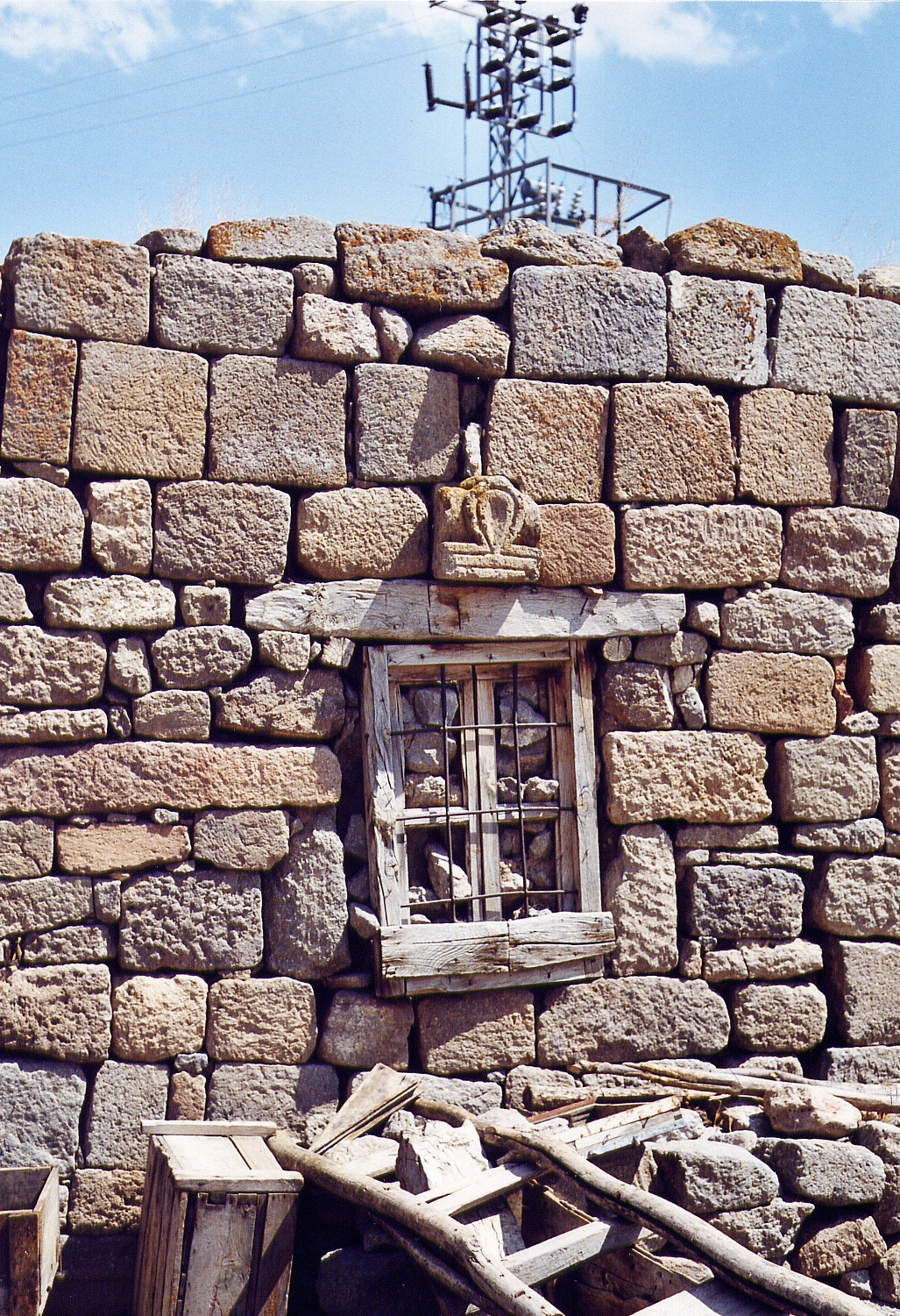

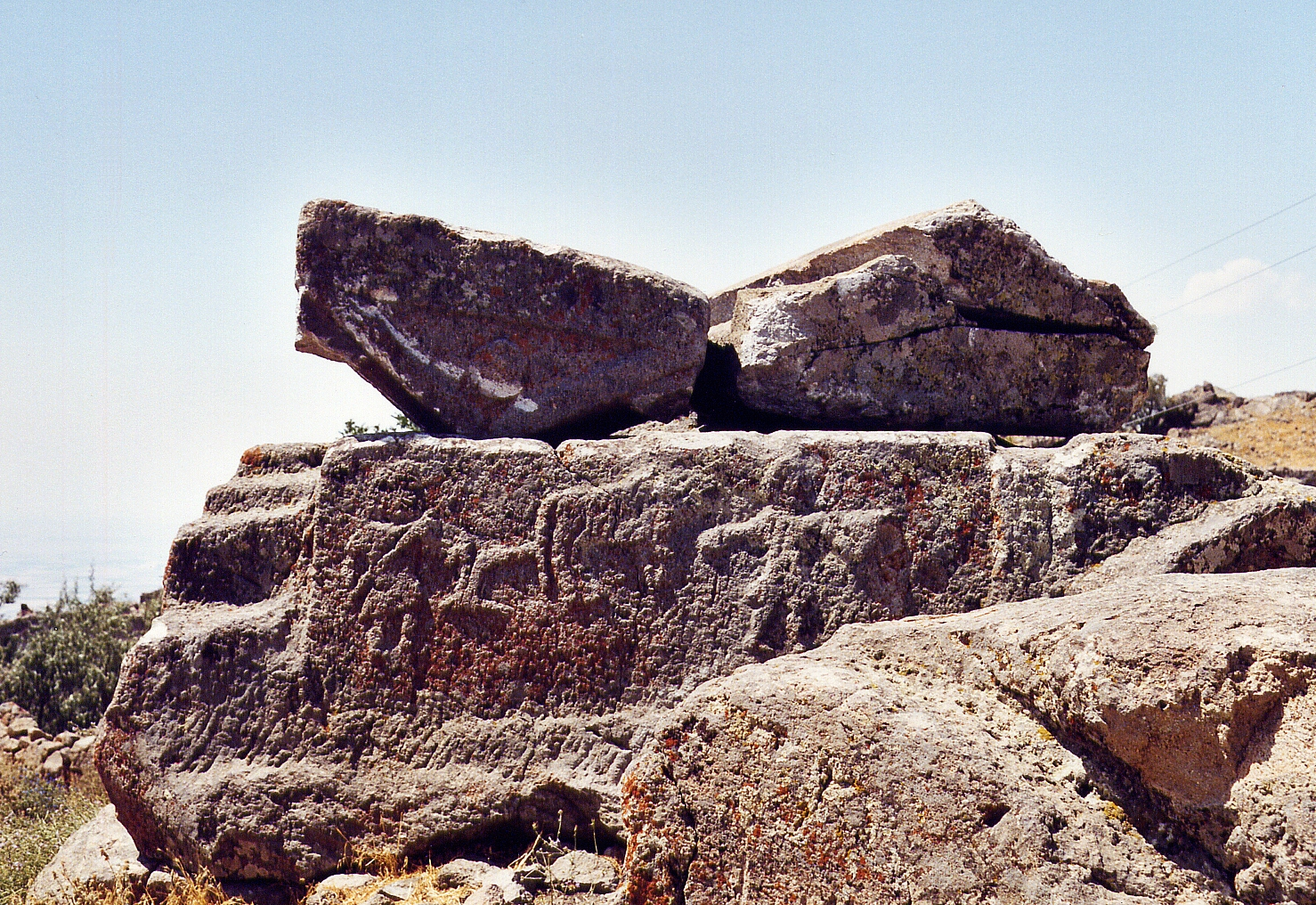

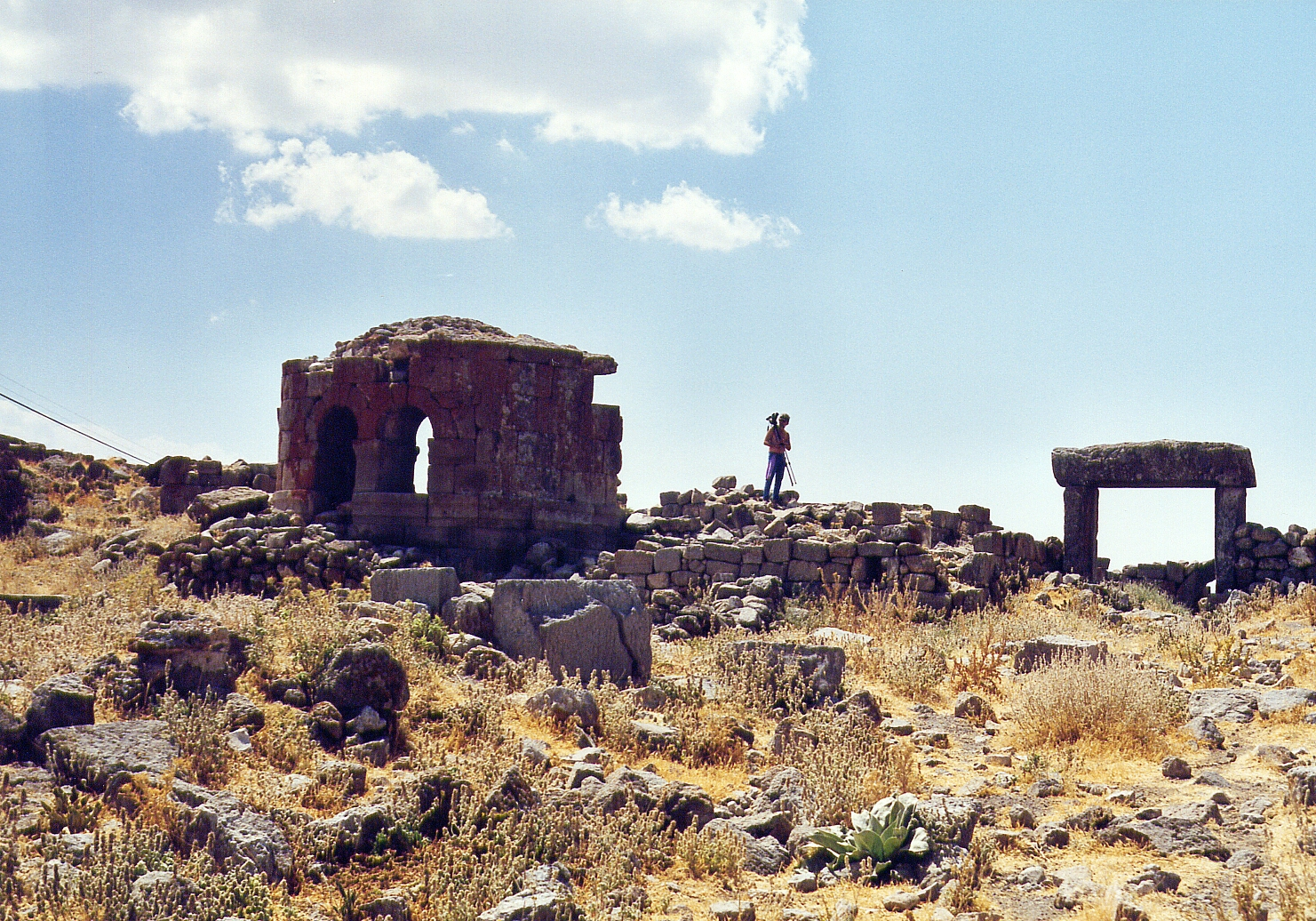

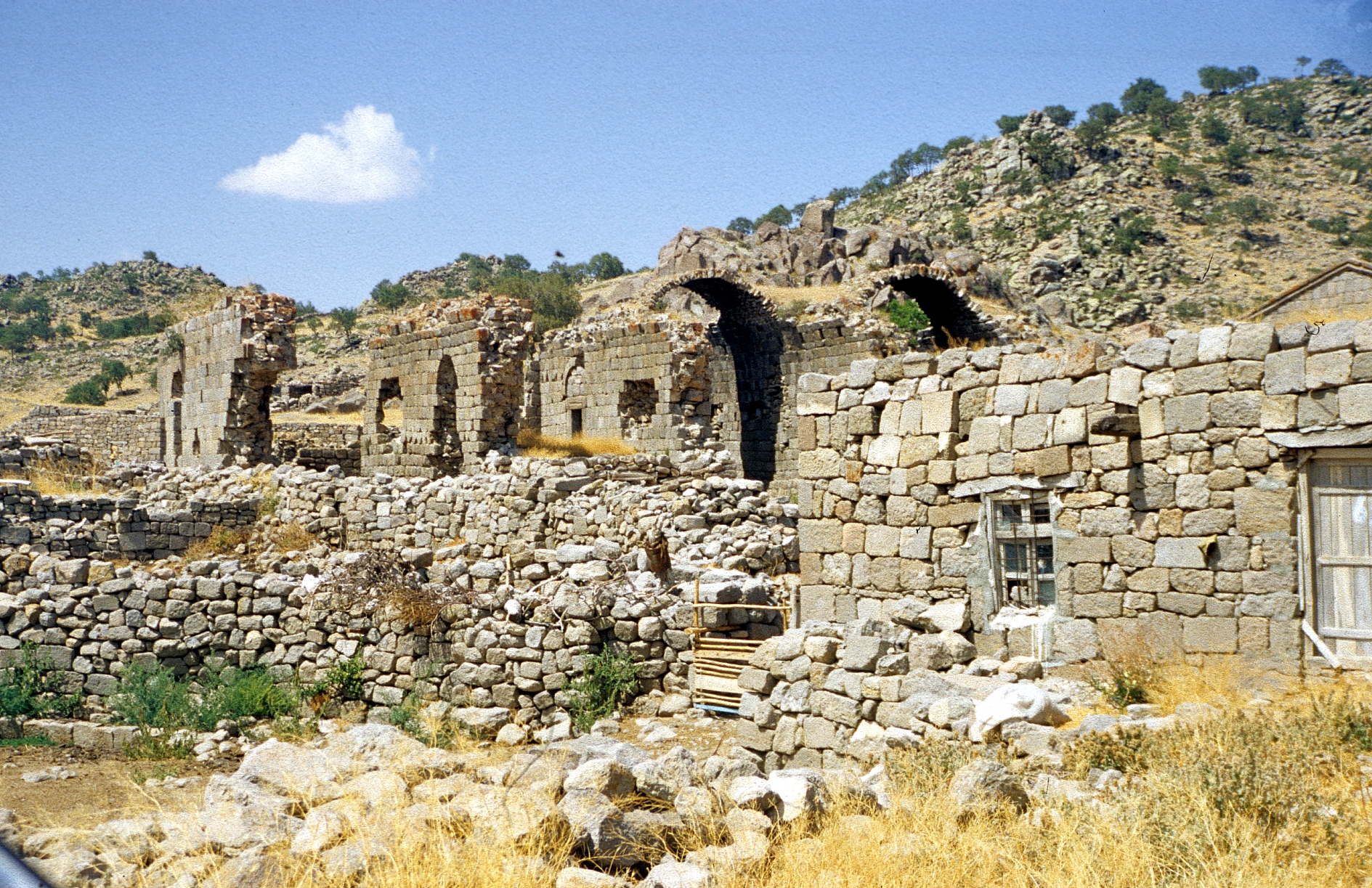

== Bibliography ==
- Carl Holzmann (1904). Binbirkilise: Archäologische Skizzen aus Anatolien: ein Beitrag zur Kunstgeschichte des christlichen Kirchenbaues, Verlag Von Boysen & Maasch
- William Mitchell Ramsay (2008). Gertrude Lowthian Bell, Robert G. Ousterhout: The Thousand and One Churches, University of Pennsylvania Museum of Archaeology and Anthropology, ISBN 9781934536056
- Semavi Eyice (1971). Recherches archéologiques à Karadağ (Binbirkilise) et dans la région de Karaman. Doğan Kardeş
