= Madenşehri =

- Village
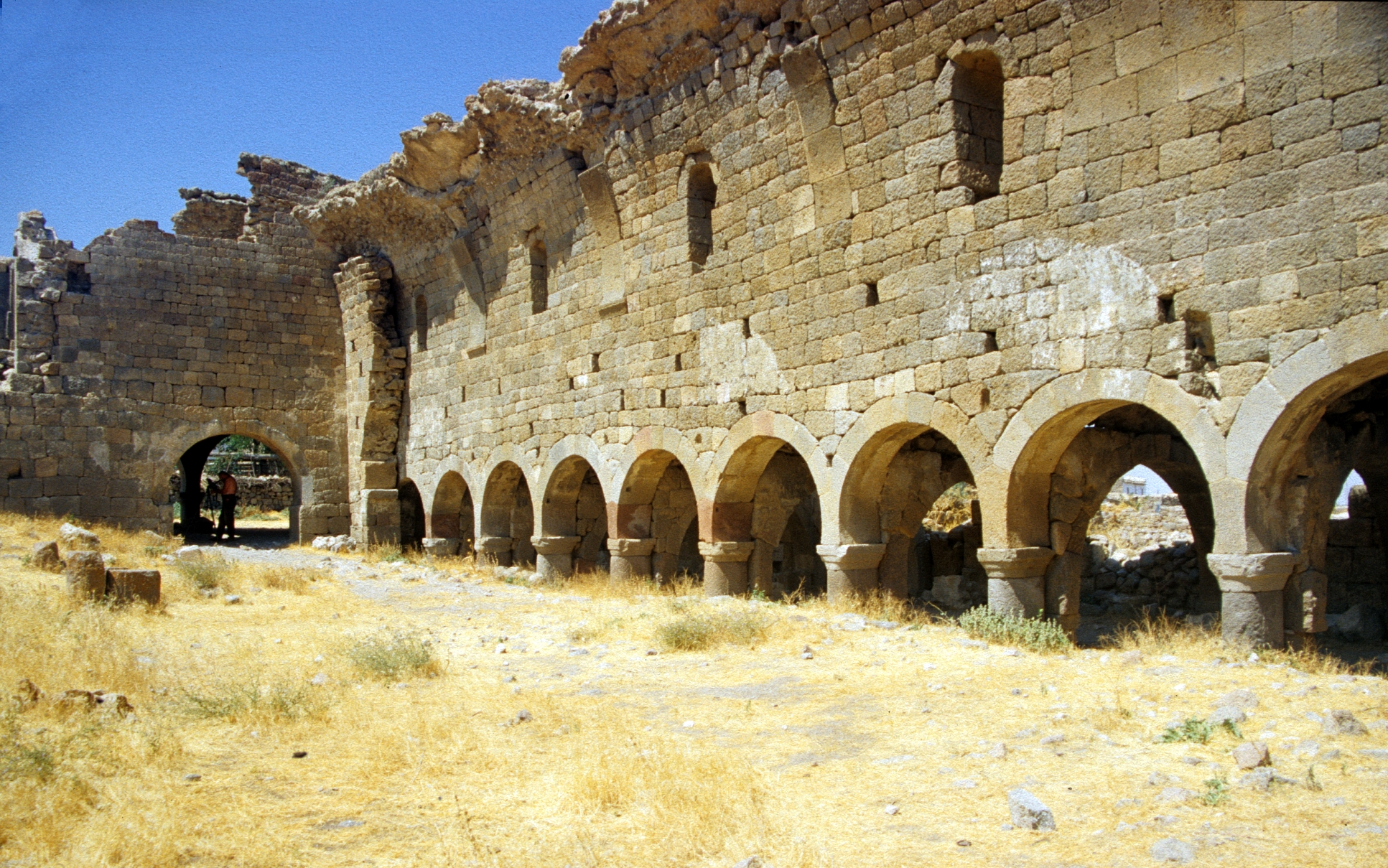
- Ruins in Madenşehri

- Location within Turkey Location within Turkey Central Anatolia
- Coordinates: 37°26′N 33°10′E
- Country: Turkey
- Province: Karaman
- District: Karaman
- Elevation: 1,230 m (4,040 ft)
- Population (2022): 289
- Time zone: UTC+3 (TRT)
- Postal code: 70000
- Area code: 0338

Madenşehri (literally “city of mines”) is a village in the Karaman District of Karaman Province, Turkey. Its population is 289 (2022). It is situated on the northern slopes of Karadağ, an extinct volcano, and is 42 kilometres (26 mi) north of the town of Karaman.

== History ==
Like some other Karadağ locations, Madenşehri has many early-Christian ruins. It occupies the site of the ancient city of Barata in the Roman province of Lycaonia. It became the seat of a bishopric, a suffragan of Iconium, the capital of the province. The names of five of its early bishops are known. Stephanus participated in the First Council of Nicaea in 325. Eugenius was bishop in 451, and the metropolitan bishop of Iconium Onesiphorus signed the acts of the Council of Chalcedon on his behalf. Martyrius was at a synod in Constantinople in 536. Constantinus attended the Third Council of Constantinople in 680 and signed the acts also on behalf of his metropolitan Paulus. He also attended the Trullan Council of 692. Georgius was at the Photian Council of Constantinople (879). No longer a residential bishopric, Barata is today listed by the Catholic Church as a titular see.

== Place of interest ==
- Binbirkilise, church ruins from the Byzantine period.
