= Korasion =

Town of ancient Cilicia

Coordinates: 36°25′16″N 34°05′19″E

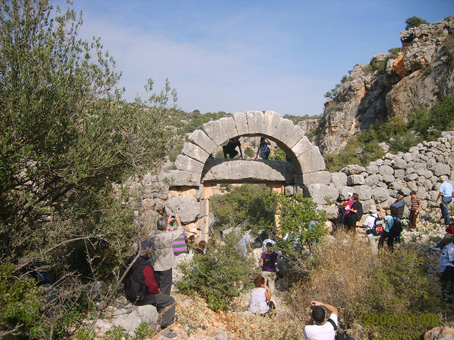
Korasion ruins

Korasion, also called Kalon Korakesion, was a town of ancient Cilicia, on the coast a little to the east of Seleucia ad Calycadnum, inhabited during the Roman and Byzantine eras.

Its site is tentatively located near Susanoğlu in Asiatic Turkey.
