= Karakabaklı =

Human settlement

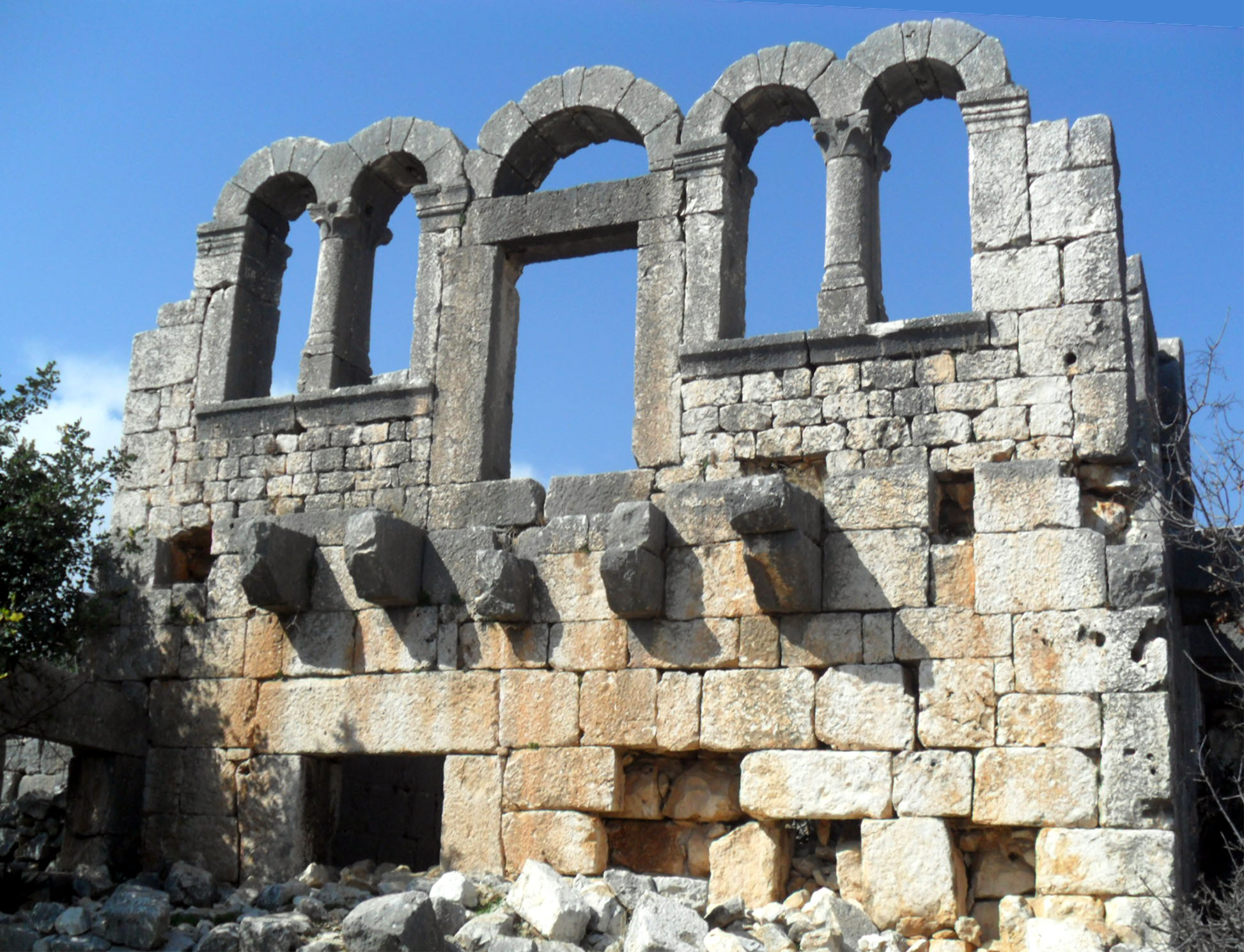

- Location within Turkey
- 36°26′N 34°01′E
- Type: Settlement
- Periods: Hellenistic Age to Byzantine Empire
- Location: Silifke, Mersin Province, Turkey
- Region: Mediterranean Region

History
- Abandoned: 7th century (?)

Site notes
- Archaeologists: Semavi Eyice

Karakabaklı is an archaeological site in Mersin Province, Turkey.

== Geography ==
Karakabaklı is situated next to Karadedeli village (now a remote neighborhood of Atakent) in the rural area of Silifke district. In the antiquity this region was called Cilicia Trachaea (Rugged Cilicia). Karakabaklı is to the east of Silifke and to the north of Turkish state highway D.400. It can be reached via a 7 kilometres (4.3 mi) road from Atakent which is on D-400. The villa rustica Sinekkale is to north of Karakabaklı. The distance from Karakabaklı to Silifke is 22 kilometres (14 mi) and to Mersin is 74 kilometres (46 mi) .

== History ==
The settlement dates back to Hellenistic age. But it was rebuilt and inhabited during the Roman and early Byzantine ages. It was probably abandoned during the Arab–Byzantine wars in the 7th and 8th centuries. Neither Hellenistic nor the Roman name of the settlement is known. Karakabaklı is a Turkish name.

== Ruins ==
According to Professor Semavi Eyice who has studied on the ruins there are many houses and seven of them are in relatively good condition. Four of them are one-storey and three of them are two-storey houses. The building material is limestone. Eyice notes that the percentage of standing buildings is higher in Karakabaklı than in most other ancient settlements. The plans of the houses are not standard and they probably belonged to people of different economic status. There are also, basilicas, a tetrapylon, cisterns and a partially unearthed Roman road. The settlement is included in the official list of Archaeological sites of Turkey.
