= Astragalus subvestitus =

Conservation status
- Vulnerable (NatureServe)

Scientific classification
- Kingdom: Plantae
- Clade: Tracheophytes
- Clade: Angiosperms
- Clade: Eudicots
- Clade: Rosids
- Order: Fabales
- Family: Fabaceae
- Subfamily: Faboideae
- Genus: Astragalus
- Species: A. subvestitus

Binomial name
- Astragalus subvestitus (Jeps.) Barneby

Species of legume

Astragalus subvestitus is a species of milkvetch known by the common name Kern County milkvetch.

== Distribution and habitat ==
It is endemic to California, where it grows in sagebrush habitat on the slopes of the Sierra Nevada in Kern and Tulare Counties. It grows in meadows and seeps, as well as pinyon and juniper woodland on gravelly or sandy soils.

== Description ==
Astragalus subvestitus is small, hairy, mat-forming perennial herb producing stems no longer than 8 centimeters. The leaves are a few centimeters long and made up of several hairy oval-shaped leaflets. The small inflorescence holds a few purple-tinged white flowers each just over a centimeter in length.

The fruit is a papery legume pod covered in short, curly white hairs and bearing a triangular beak at the tip.
