= Carl Holzmann =

Austrian architect

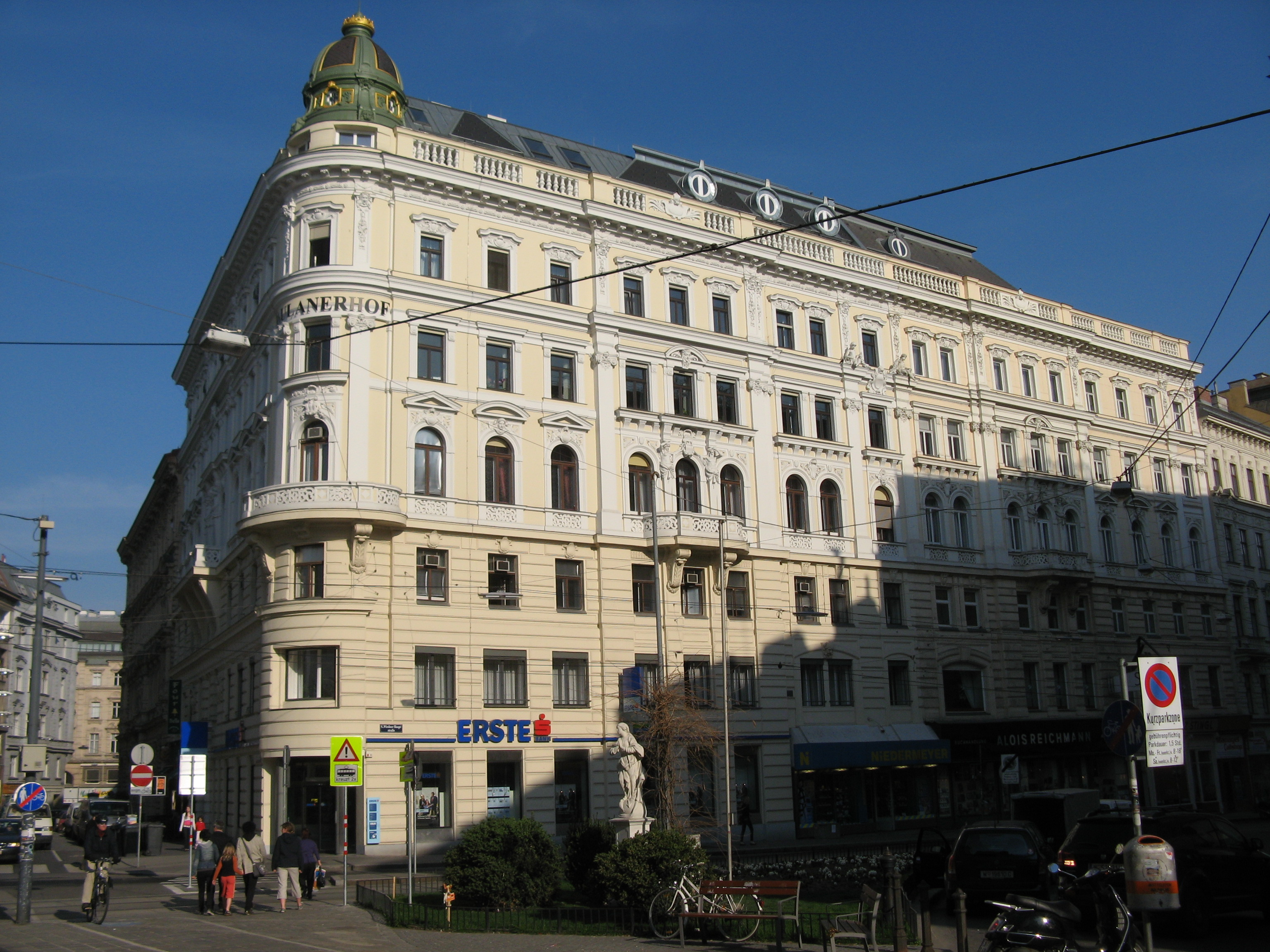
Carl Holzmann: Paulanerhof, Vienna (1894)

Carl Holzmann (22 February 1849, Šitboř (Poběžovice), Bohemia, Austrian Empire – 14 September 1914, Baden bei Wien, Lower Austria, Austria-Hungary) was an Austrian architect who designed several apartment buildings in the centre of Vienna, mostly in the Historicist style. They include the Paulanerhof (1894) and the Habig-Hof (1896).

== Biography ==
Carl Holzmann was first trained as a bricklayer. After a period in Germany and Upper Austria, he settled in Vienna, where he worked for a builder in Liesing and attended Mathias Prem's building school. From 1873 to 1875, he was foreman for City Architect Sonnleithner and the building contractor Johann Sturany. From 1875 to 1877, he studied at the Vienna University of Technology. He then worked for the Union-Baugesellschaft (Union Construction Company), where he contributed to the Palace of Justice as deputy foreman and to the Hofburg Palace as a draftsman. In 1885, Holzmann started his own construction company, which was initially successful but, probably as a result of inadequate quotations, fell into bankruptcy in 1906. As a result, he had to sell all his properties. Thereafter Holzmann worked on national or provincial assignments for the remainder of his life. His firm was still in debt when he died at the age of 65 but was maintained by his wife and daughter until 1928.

== Approach ==
Carl Holzmann designed his buildings strictly in accordance with Historicist principles although his later works were decorated in the Vienna Secession style. His buildings in the centre of Vienna exhibit a representative style while those in the outskirts were influenced by the Swiss chalet style. Holzmann often bought old properties, replacing them with buildings to his own designs. He included components of all the fashionable styles of his day, integrated by his own experienced hand. Hardly a proponent of innovation, he simply kept up with mainstream architectural trends.

== Works ==
- Apartment building, Favoritenstraße 37, Vienna 4 (1891)
- Apartment building, Favoritenstraße 39, Vienna 4 (1891)
- Apartment building Paulanerhof, Wiedner Hauptstraße 18−20, Vienna 4 (1894)
- Apartment building, Favoritenstraße 44, Vienna 4 (1895)
- Apartment building Haber-Hof, Wiedner Hauptstraße 13, Vienna 4 (1896)
- Apartment building, Paniglgasse 17 und 17A, Vienna 4 (1896)
- Hotel Kaiserhof, Frankenberggasse 10, Vienna 4, (1896)
- Apartment building, Favoritenstraße 22, Vienna 4 (1897)
- Apartment building, Johann-Strauß-Gasse 36, Vienna 4 (1900)
- Apartment building, Johann-Strauß-Gasse 38, Vienna 4 (1900−1901)
- Apartment building, Johann-Strauß-Gasse 40, Vienna 4 (1902)
- Apartment building, Paniglgasse 18−20, Vienna 4 (1900−1901)
- Apartment building, Josefstädterstraße 28, Vienna 8 (vor 1902)
- Residential housing, In der Hagenau 9−27, Vienna 13 (1904)
- Strassenhof, Köstlergasse 5−9, Vienna 6 (1905)
- Housing for the Wiener Beamtenbauverein, Graf-Seilern-Gasse 14−18, Vienna 12 (1905)
- Apartment complex, Argentinierstraße 2, Vienna 4 (1908)
- Housing for streetcar staff, Johann-Hoffmann-Platz 10−15, Vienna 12 (1912)

== Sources ==
- Kunsthistorische Arbeitsgruppe GeVAG: Wiener Fassaden des 19. Jahrhunderts, Vienna 1976 (in German)
- Neubauten in Österreich. 3 Bde. Vienna o.J. (in German)
- G. Hajos: Die Profanbauten des III., IV. und V. Bezirks, ÖKT 44, Vienna 1980 (in German)
- H. Weihsmann: Das Rote Wien. Vienna 2002 (1985) (in German)
- G. Weissenbacher: In Hietzing gebaut. 2 Bde. Vienna 1999-2000
