= Semavi Eyice =

Turkish art historian and archaeologist (1922–2018)

Prof. Dr. Semavi Eyice
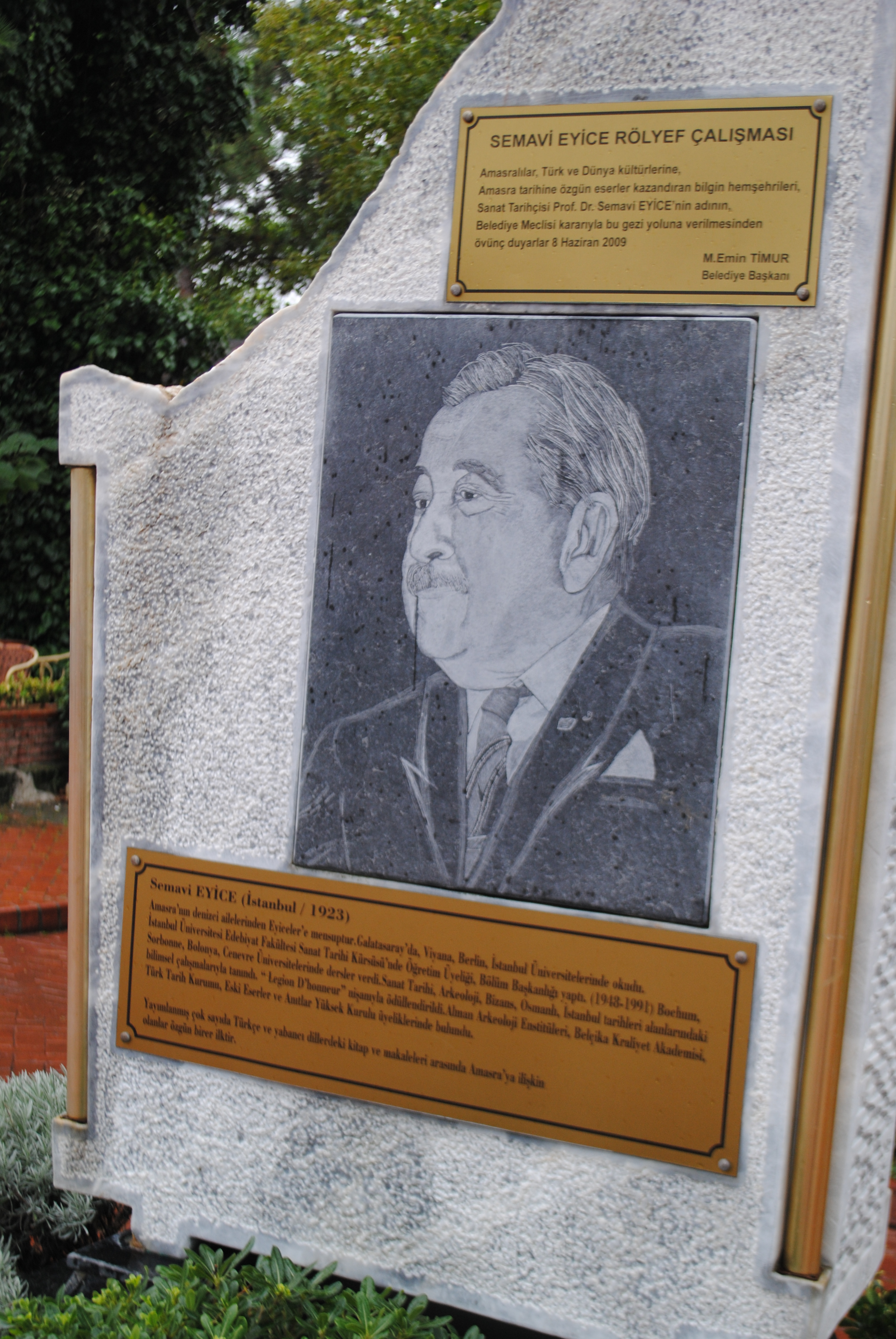
- A relief of Semavi Eyice in his parents' hometown of Amasra
- Born: 9 December 1922; Kadıköy, Istanbul, Ottoman Empire
- Died: 28 May 2018 (aged 95); Istanbul, Turkey
- Education: University of Istanbul
- Occupation: Academic
- Known for: Research on Byzantine and Ottoman Art and Archaeology
- Spouse: Kamran Yalgın

Mustafa Semavi Eyice (9 December 1922 in Istanbul, Turkey – 28 May 2018 in Istanbul, Turkey) was a Turkish art historian and archaeologist, who specialised in the study of Byzantine and Ottoman art in Istanbul. Professor Eyice is widely regarded as the pioneer of Byzantine studies in Turkey.

== Early life ==
Born on 9 December 1922 at Kadıköy, Istanbul, to parents originating from Amasra, he grew up in Istanbul, where he attended the primary and secondary French schools in Kadıköy district, and graduated in 1943 from the Galatasaray Lisesi in Beyoğlu.

During World War II, he went to Germany to learn the language. During the war years he attended in two different periods lectures in archeology, history and art history respectively at the Universities of Vienna and Berlin (at that time heavily bombed).

In 1945, he was forced to leave Berlin, and was evacuated to Denmark and Sweden. In the same year, he returned to Turkey to undertake the study of art history at Istanbul University, where he graduated in 1948 under Ernst Diez with a thesis on the minarets of Istanbul.

He then worked as a research assistant in the Department of Art History, and earned his doctorate in 1952 with the work Side'nin Bizans Dönemine Ait Yapıları (English: Buildings of the Byzantine era in Side). In 1955, he was appointed associate professor after publishing his work Istanbul’da Son Devir Bizans Mimarisi (English: Architecture of the late Byzantine age in Istanbul). In the same year, Semavi Eyice published Istanbul, Petit guide à travers les monuments byzantins et turcs (English: Istanbul, a small guide to Byzantine and Turkish landmarks), a book which is still among the most cited works in the field of Constantinople's art history.

== Academic career ==
After founding the Byzantine Art Department at İstanbul University in 1963, he was appointed the next year first full professor of the newly established chair. In the course of his academic career he has lectured at numerous institutions, including Ankara Hacettepe University and Istanbul Mimar Sinan Fine Arts University, and abroad at the Ėcole des Hautes Ėtudes, the Sorbonne in Paris, and the Universities of Geneva and Bologna. In addition to his teaching activity, he has engaged in archaeological field research in various places including the region of Binbirkilise in south-central Anatolia, various Byzantine settlements around Silifke in Cilicia (among them Karakabaklı), and Thrace.

Since 1946 he has published 15 books and more than 500 papers and contributions to encyclopedic works, and until his death he has been fully active in research and teaching. His library, containing more than 30,000 rare editions and books dealing not only with Byzantine history and art, but also with Islamic, Turkish and Ottoman history, art and literature, is now hosted by the Istanbul Research Institute. In addition to his main scientific field in Byzantine art and archaeology, and Turkish art in the Ottoman era, he has done research on foreign painters and travellers who visited Turkey, and has also studied the traces left by the Genoese in Turkey.

Professor Eyice was a member of several research organizations, including the German Archaeological Institute. In 1955, he received the Légion d'honneur Medal from the Académie de France, and in the same year he was awarded the Prize of the Turkish Academy of Sciences. In 2011, President of Turkey Abdullah Gül awarded Prof. Eyice with the Presidential Culture and Arts Grand Prix.

Semavi Eyice was appointed Professor Emeritus in 1990. He has been married to Kamran Yalgın since 1954.

== Selected works ==
- Istanbul, Petit guide à travers les monuments byzantins et turcs Istanbul: Istanbul Matbaası, 1955
- Son devir Bizans mimarisi: Istanbul'da Palaiologos'lar devri anıtları Istanbul, 1963
- Recherches archéologiques à Karadağ (Binbirkilise) et dans la région de Karaman Istanbul, 1971
- İstanbul yazıları. Istanbul: Türkiye Turing ve Otomobil Kurumu, 1992, ISBN 9789757641155.
- Some Byzantine towns in Cilicia Tracheia In 150 years of German Archaeological Institute, Mainz 1981, pp. 204–209.

A complete bibliography of his publications can be found at

- Şakiroğlu, Mahmut (1991). Prof. Dr. Semavi Eyice bibliyografyası. Istanbul: Turhan Kitabevi. ISBN 9789757425007.
