= Atakent =

Settlement in Turkey

- Neighbourhood
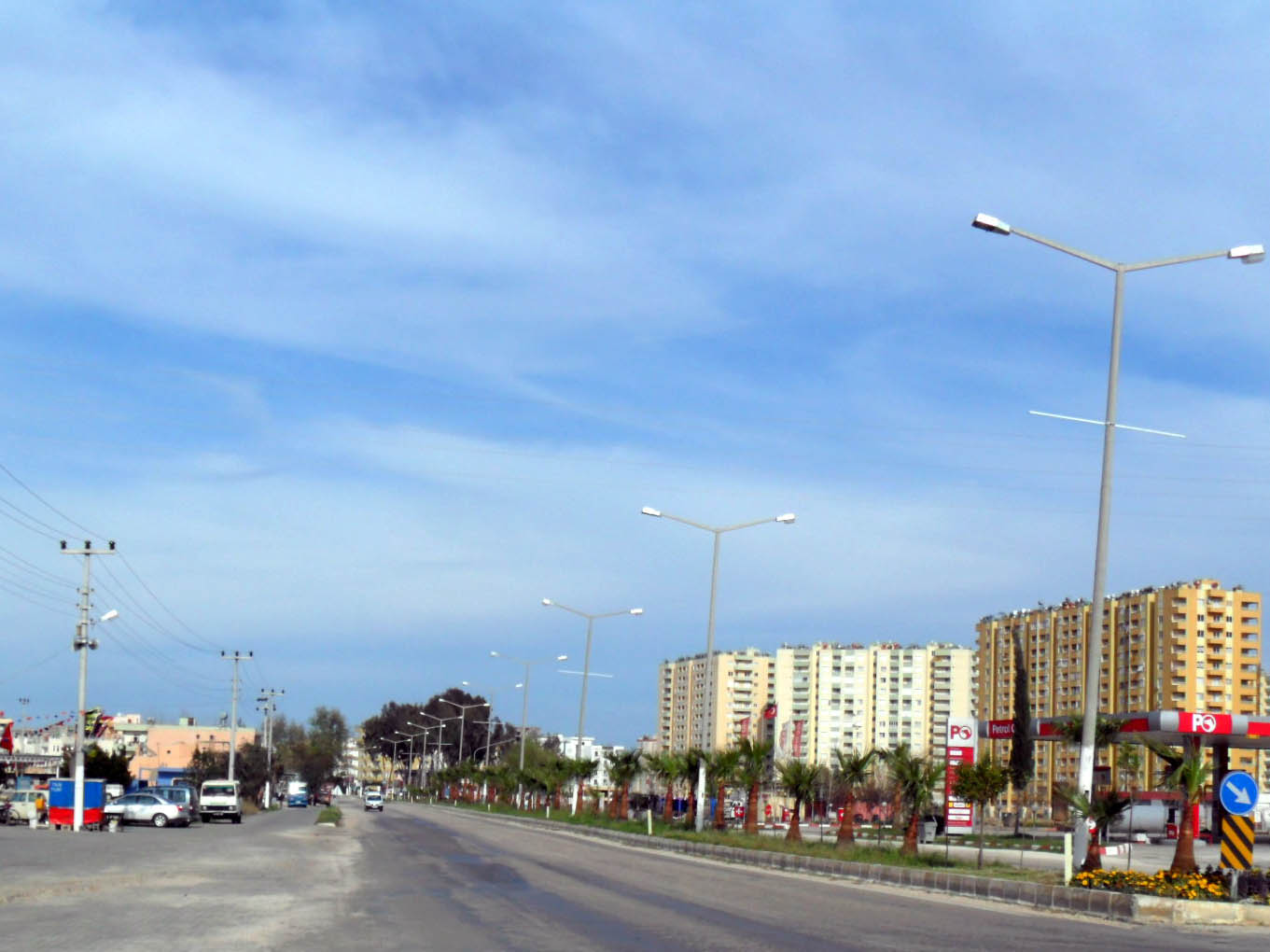

- Location within Turkey
- Coordinates: 36°24′04″N 34°03′36″E
- Country: Turkey
- Province: Mersin
- District: Silifke
- Elevation: 15 m (49 ft)
- Population (2022): 8,195
- Time zone: UTC+3 (TRT)
- Postal code: 33990
- Area code: 0324

Atakent is a neighbourhood in the municipality and district of Silifke, Mersin Province, Turkey. Its population is 8,195 (2022). Before the 2013 reorganisation, it was a town (belde).

== Geography ==
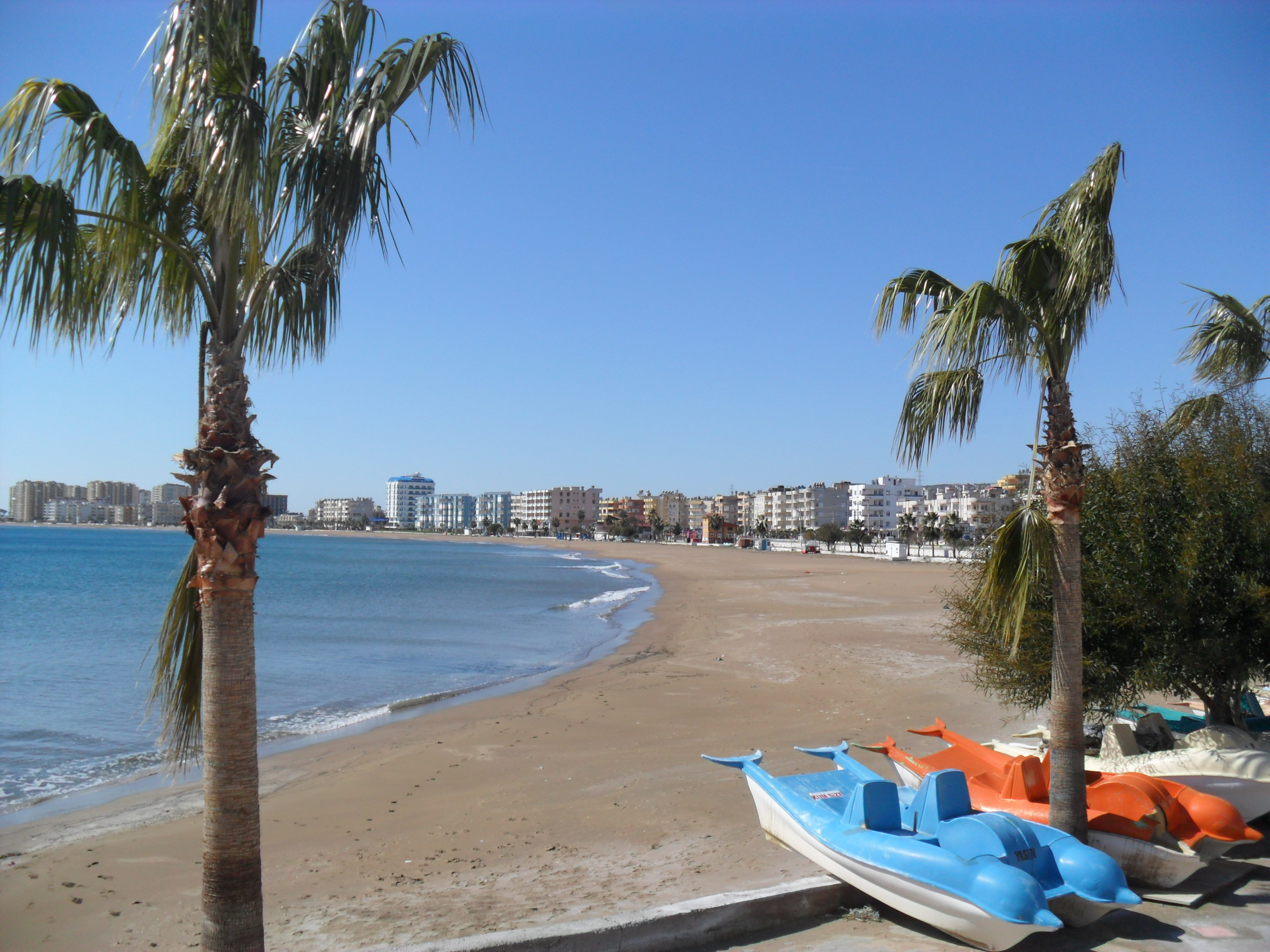

Atakent is a Mediterranean coastal town. Alluvial plains of Silifke lie in the west of the town and hilly coastline is in the east of the town. The town is on the D 400 highway. The distance to Mersin is 67 km (42 mi) and to Silifke is 15 km (9.3 mi).

== History ==
The ruins of the historical town of Korasion which had been founded by Flavius Uranius, the governor of Roman Province Isauria between 367−375, is on the north east of the town. The ruins of Hellenistic and Roman settlement Karakabaklı are to the north. The new town is actually formed by a merger of four Turkmen villages in 1987. Now the former villages are quarters of the town. Susanoğlu quarter is at the east and Kapızlı quarter is at the west.

== Economy ==
The main activity in Atakent with wide sandy beaches is tourism. Boarding houses and campings as well as newer hotels and clubs attract domestic tourists. Agriculture, especially forced crop agriculture is also an important activity. Fruits, like strawberries are well known products of Atakent.
