= Peisander (disambiguation) =

The name Peisander or Pisander (Ancient Greek: Πείσανδρος, Peisandros) can refer to several historical figures:

- Peisander of Camirus in Rhodes, Ancient Greek epic poet, supposed to have flourished about 640 BC
- Peisander (navarch), Spartan general during the Corinthian War
- Peisander (oligarch) (fl. 429 - 411 BCE), Athenian who played a prominent part in the Athenian coup of 411 BCE
- Peisander of Laranda, epic poet who flourished during the reign of Alexander Severus
- Peisander (mythology), several characters in Greek mythology
