= Karaman Museum =

Archeological Museum in Turkey

- Karaman Müzesi
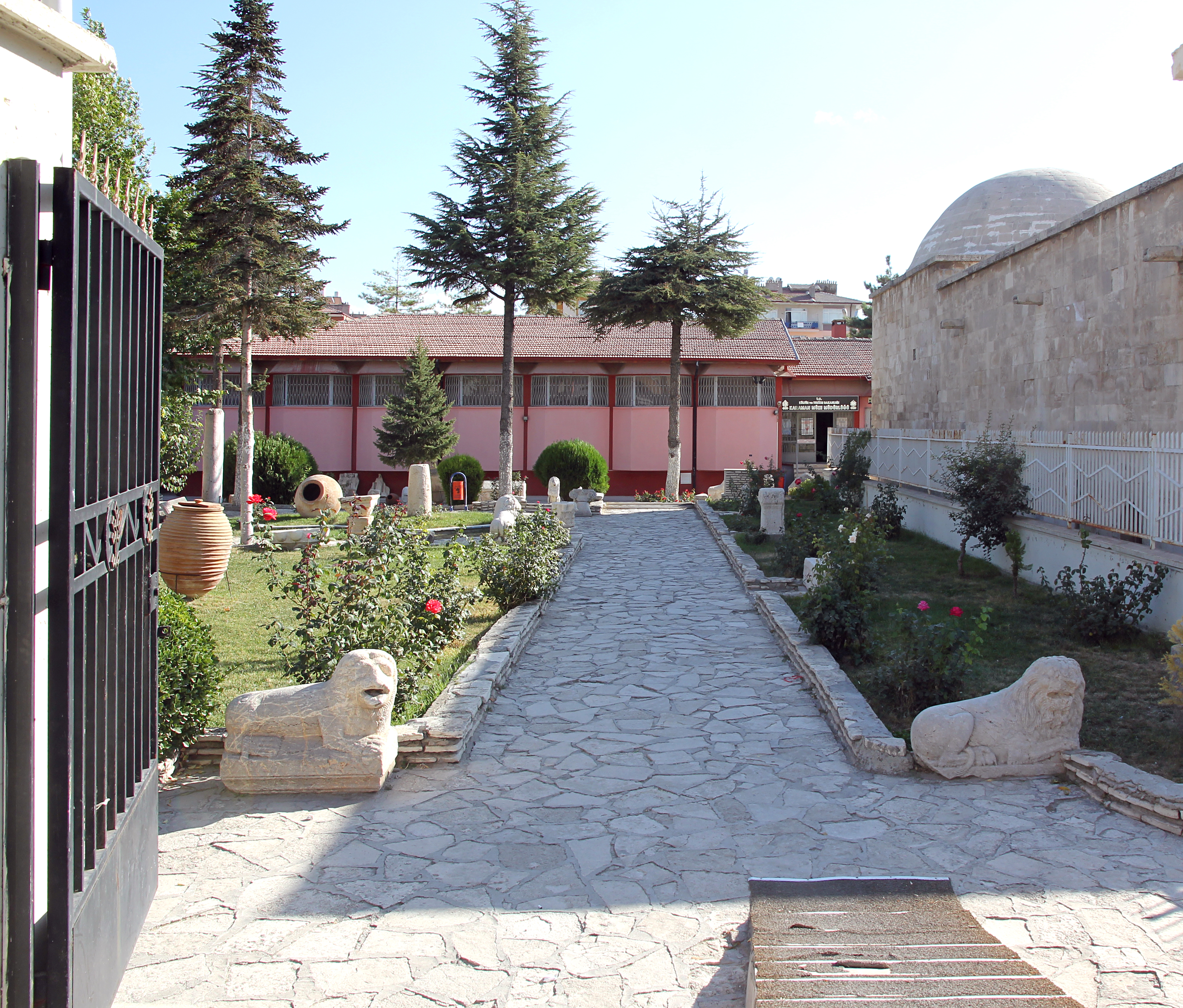
- Karaman Museum seen from entrance

- Karaman Museum
- Established: 1980; 46 years ago
- Coordinates: 37°10′58″N 32°12′41″E
- Type: Archaeology, Ethnography
- Collections: Epipaleolithic age, neolithic age, chalcolithic age, bronze age, classic age, Roman Empire, Byzantine Empire, Seljuks, Anatolian Beyliks, Ottoman Empire
- Owner: Ministry of Culture and Tourism

Karaman Museum is in Karaman, Turkey

The museum is at 37°10′58″N 33°12′41″E. It is to the east of the Karaman Castle. The museum was established in 1980.

In the museum there are two halls one reserved for the archaeological items and one for the ethnographical items. In these halls items from epipaleolithic age, Neolithic age, chalcolithic age, Bronze Age, classic age, Roman Empire, Byzantine Empire, Seljuks, Anatolian Beyliks (mainly Karamanids) and the Ottoman Empire are exhibited. Some of the items are, earthenware kitchen tools, ornaments, teardrop bottles, weapons etc. In the windows coinage of the said eras are exhibited.

One notable item is the corpse of so-called "manazan woman". She was a young woman whose corpse was found in a cave named "manazan". With radiocarbon methods the corpse is dated to 1000-1200 CE. But her clothes and hair as well as parts of her flesh have remained almost intact because of the clay rocks covering her body.
