= Peisander =

Ancient Greek epic poet

Peisander (/paɪˈsændər, ˈpaɪˌsændər/; Greek: Πείσανδρος) of Camirus in Rhodes, Ancient Greek epic poet, supposed to have flourished about 640 BC.

== Biography ==
Peisander was the author of a Heracleia (Ἡράκλεια), in which he introduced a new conception of the hero Heracles' costume, the lions skin and club taking the place of the older armor of the heroic era. He is also said to have fixed the number of the labors of Heracles at twelve. The work, which according to Clement of Alexandria (Stromata, yr. ch. 2) was simply a plagiarism from an unknown Pisinus of Lindus, enjoyed so high a reputation that the Alexandrian critics admitted the author to the epic canon. From an epigram (22) of Theocritus we learn that a statue was erected in honor of Peisander by his countrymen. He is to be distinguished from Peisander of Laranda in Lycia, who lived during the reign of Alexander Severus and wrote a poem on the mixed marriages of gods and mortals, after the manner of the Hesiodic Catalogue of Women.
