= Karaman =

City in south-central Turkey

- Municipality
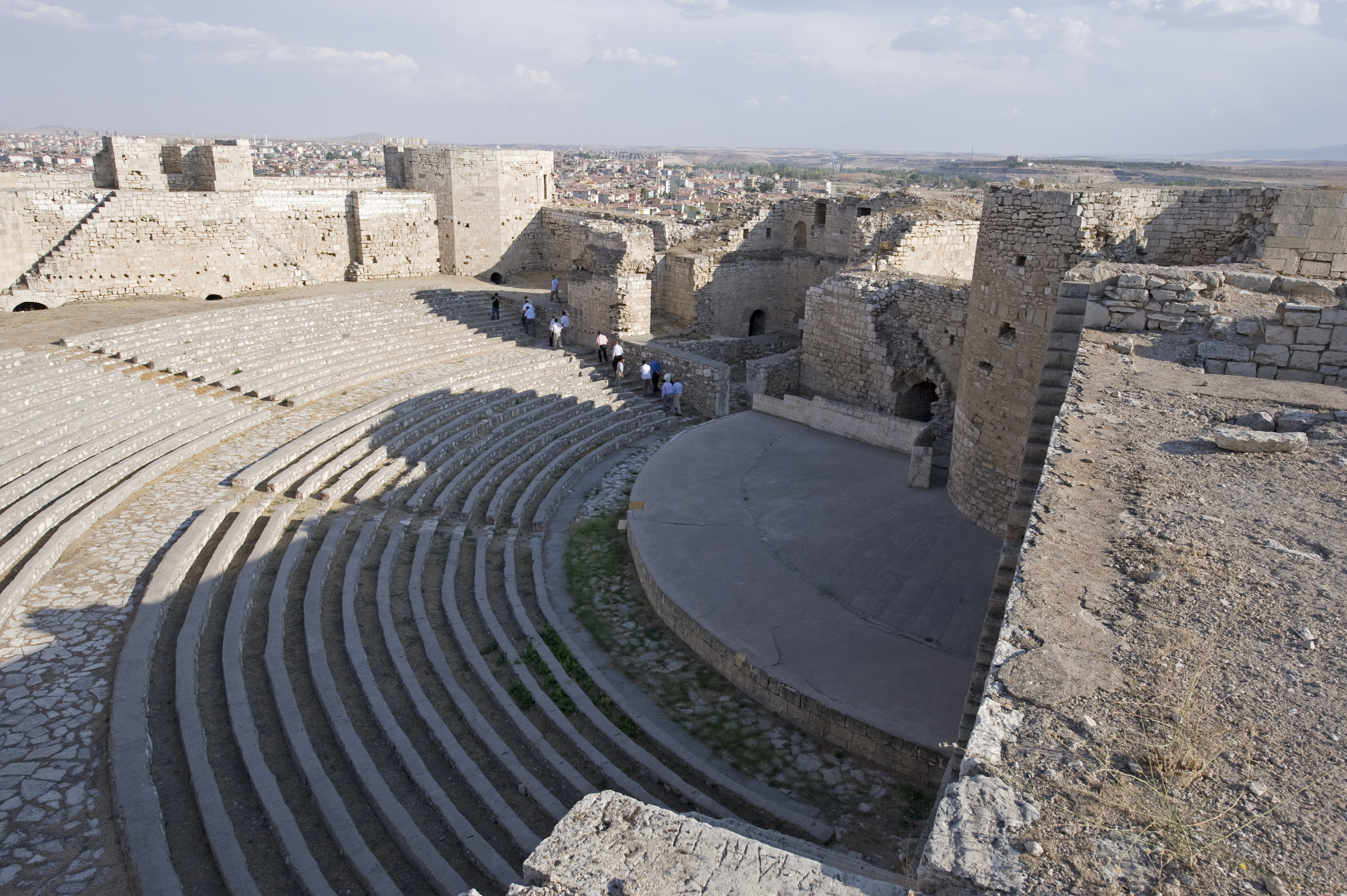
- View from Karaman Castle

- Coat of arms

- Location within Turkey Location within Turkey Central Anatolia
- Coordinates: 37°10′55″N 33°13′05″E
- Country: Turkey
- Province: Karaman
- District: Karaman

Government
  - Mayor: Savaş Kalaycı (MHP)
- Elevation: 1,039 m (3,409 ft)
- Population (2022): 175,390
- Time zone: UTC+3 (TRT)
- Postal code: 70000
- Area code: 0338
- Website: www.karaman.bel.tr

Karaman is a city in south central Turkey, located in Central Anatolia, north of the Taurus Mountains, about 100 km (62 mi) south of Konya. It is the seat of Karaman Province and Karaman District. Its population is 175,390 (2022). The town lies at an average elevation of 1,039 m (3,409 ft). The Karaman Museum is one of the major sights.

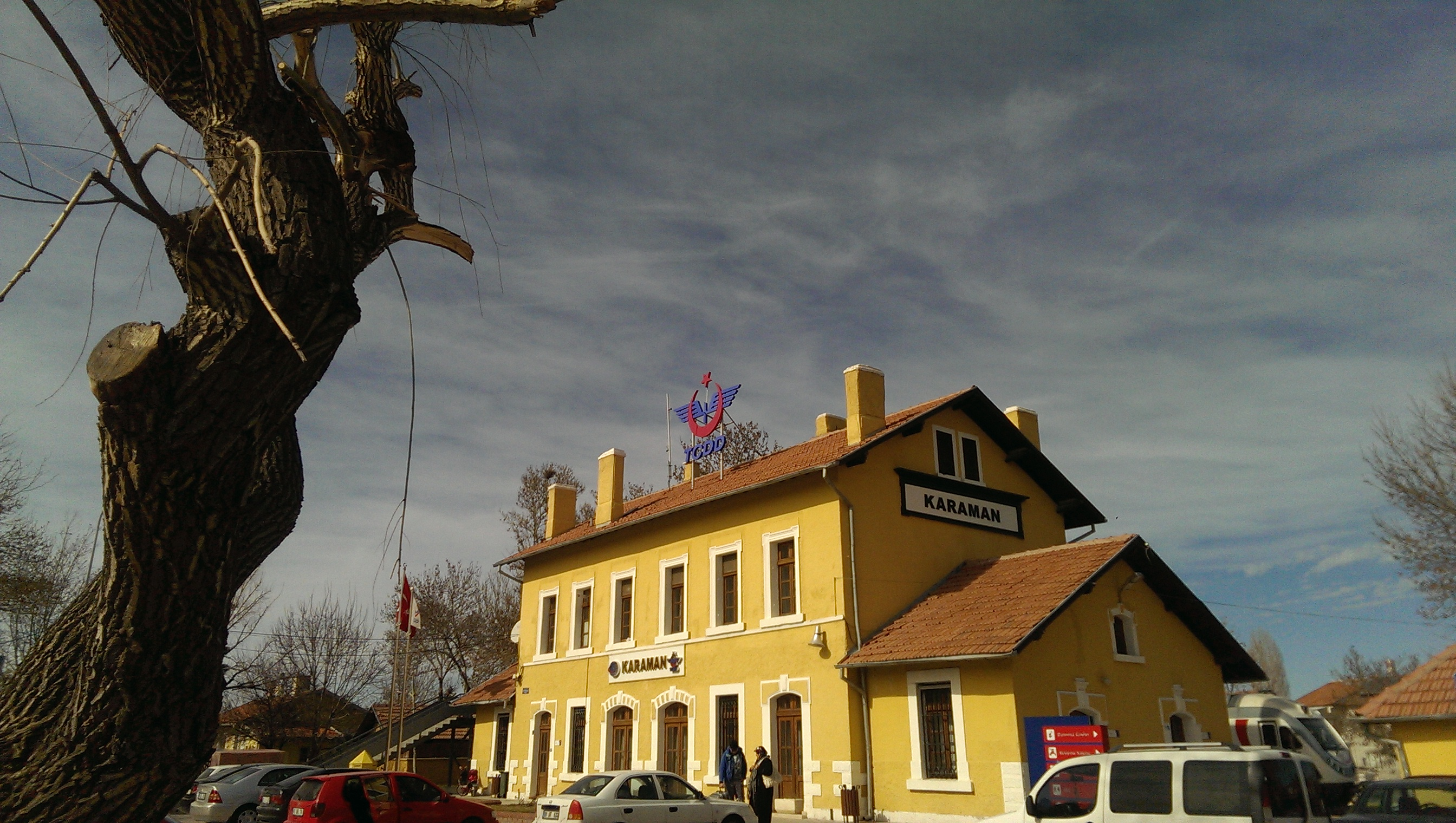
Karaman Main Station

== Etymology ==
The town owes its name to Karaman Bey, who was one of the rulers of the Karamanid dynasty. The former name Laranda which in turn comes from the Luwian language Larawanda, literally means "sandy, a sandy place".

== History ==
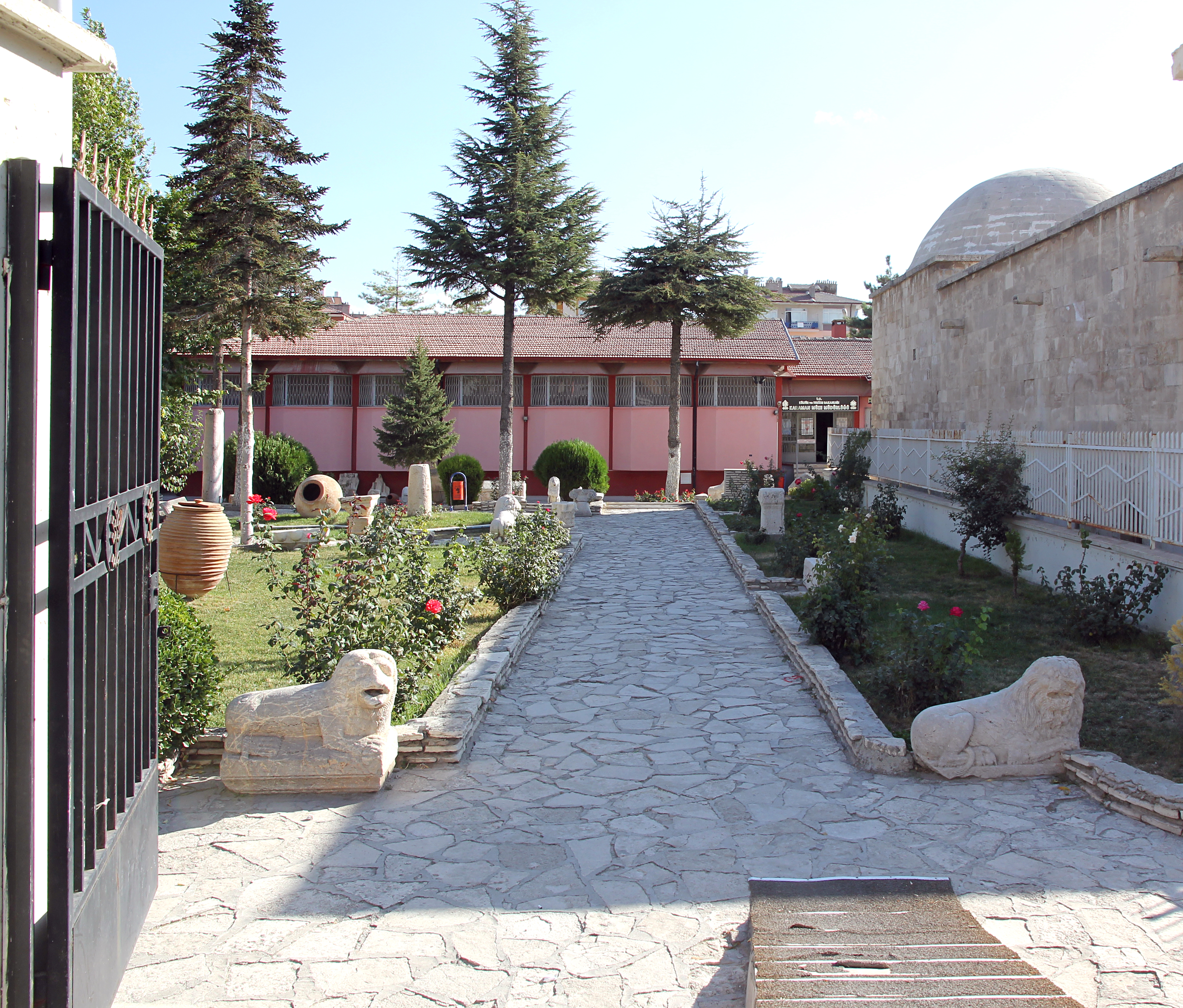
Karaman Museum.

In ancient times, Karaman was known as Lānda in Hittite and Laranda in Ancient Greek (Greek: τὰ Λάρανδα). Little is known about the early history of Laranda. The city is first mentioned by name in ancient sources through the writings of Diodorus Siculus. According to him, after Perdiccas and King Philip defeated Ariarathes I of Cappadocia, they departed from Cappadocia and set out to punish the cities of Laranda and Isauria. This was in retaliation of these cities' killing of Balacrus, a general appointed by Alexander the Great as satrap of the region. As a result, Laranda was destroyed. It later became a seat of Isaurian pirates. At one point, it was under the control of Antipater of Derbe, until he was killed by Amyntas of Galatia, who then took over the territories previously ruled by Antipater. It belonged to the Roman and later Byzantine Empires until it was captured by the Seljuks in the early 12th century. Karaman was occupied by Frederick Barbarossa in 1190 and by the Armenian Kingdom of Cilicia between 1211 and 1216. In 1256, the town was taken by Karaman Bey and was renamed Karaman in his honour. From 1275, Karaman was the capital of the Karamanid beylik.

In 1468 the Karamanids were conquered by the Ottoman Empire and in 1483 the capital of the province was moved to Konya. Karaman has retained ruins of a Karamanid castle and some walls, two mosques and a Koran school (madrasah) from that period. A mihrab from a mosque from Karaman can now be found in the Çinili Pavilion near the Archeology Museum in Istanbul. The Karamanslis were Cappadocian Turkomans who fought the Ottomans. Later they integrated into the empire.

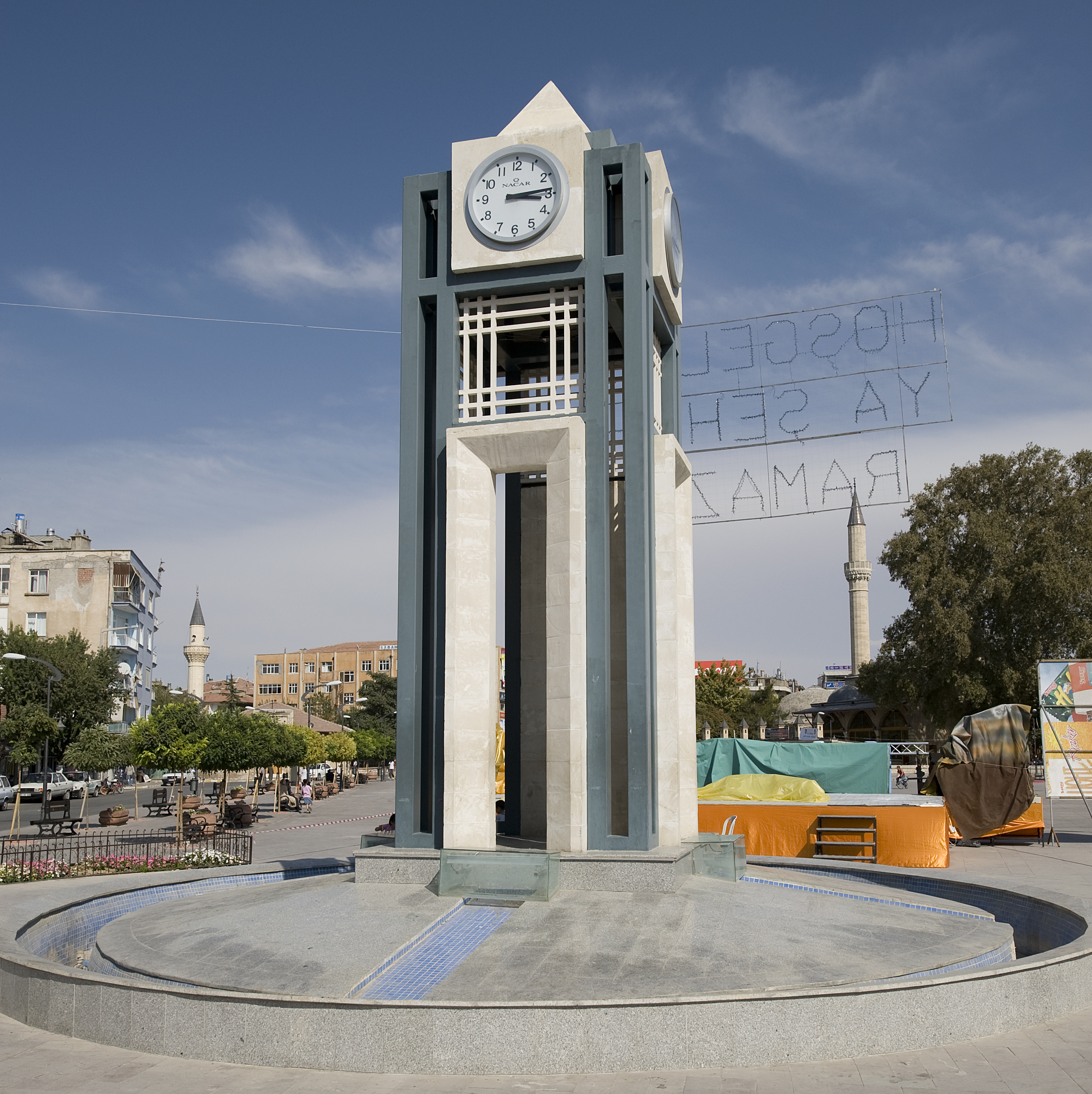
Karaman clocktower

Laranda appears in early Christian sources as the seat of a bishop named Neon during the early third century CE. In a letter preserved by Eusebius, the bishops Alexander of Jerusalem and Theoctistus of Caesarea cite Laranda as part of their defense of Origen against criticism from Bishop Demetrius of Alexandria. The dispute concerned Demetrius' claim that it was unprecedented and improper for someone who was not yet ordained as a presbyter to preach publicly. In response, they argue that this practice was not unheard of, pointing to cases in which bishops authorized capable laymen to preach. Among these examples, they mention Euelpis, who preached in Laranda with the approval of Bishop Neon.

The poet Yunus Emre (c. 1238–1320) resided in Karaman during his later years and is believed to lie buried beside the Yunus Emre Mosque. A small adjacent park is adorned with quotations from his verse, many of them graffiti-splattered. In 1222, the Sufi preacher Bahaeddin Veled arrived in town with his family, and the Karamanoğlu emir built a madrasah to accommodate them. Veled's son was the famous Rumi, who married his wife, Gevher Hatun, while his family was living in Karaman. It was here, too, that Rumi's mother died in 1224. She was buried, along with other family members, in the Aktekke Mosque (also known as the Mader-i Mevlana Cami), which Alaeddin Ali Bey had built to replace the original madrasah in 1370.

When Thomas Jefferson fought Libya's Barbary pirates, he replaced one member of the al-Qaramanli dynasty with another as Pasha.

== Notable people ==
- Nestor of Laranda, an epic poet, the father of the poet Peisander.
- Peisander of Laranda an epic poet, the son of the poet Nestor.

=== Karamanlis ===
The bearers of the Greek name Karamanlis as well as other surnames beginning with "Karaman" are a toponymic surname for the town.

== Gallery ==
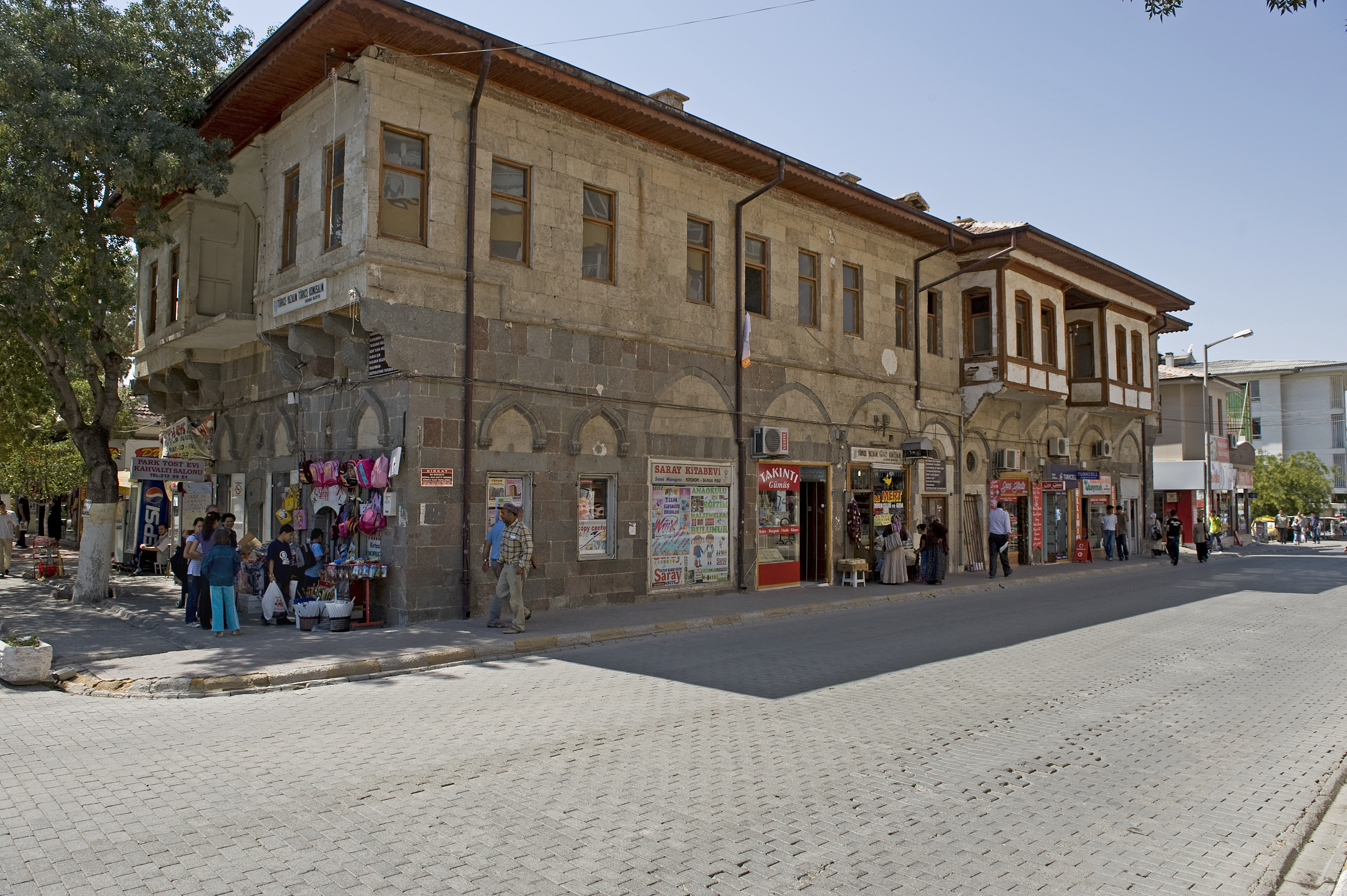
Karaman Street view

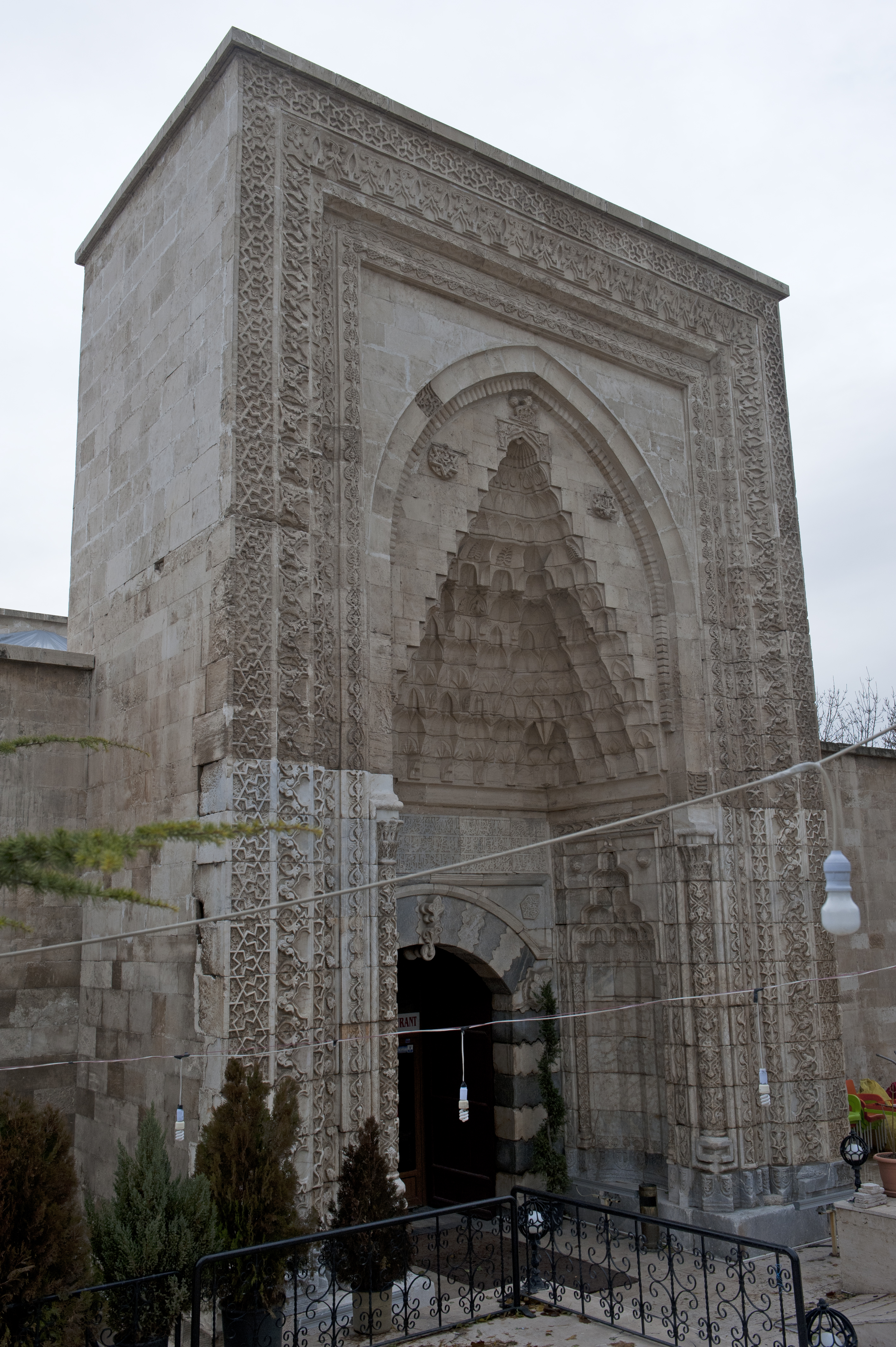
Karaman Nefesi Sultan Medresesi monumental entrance

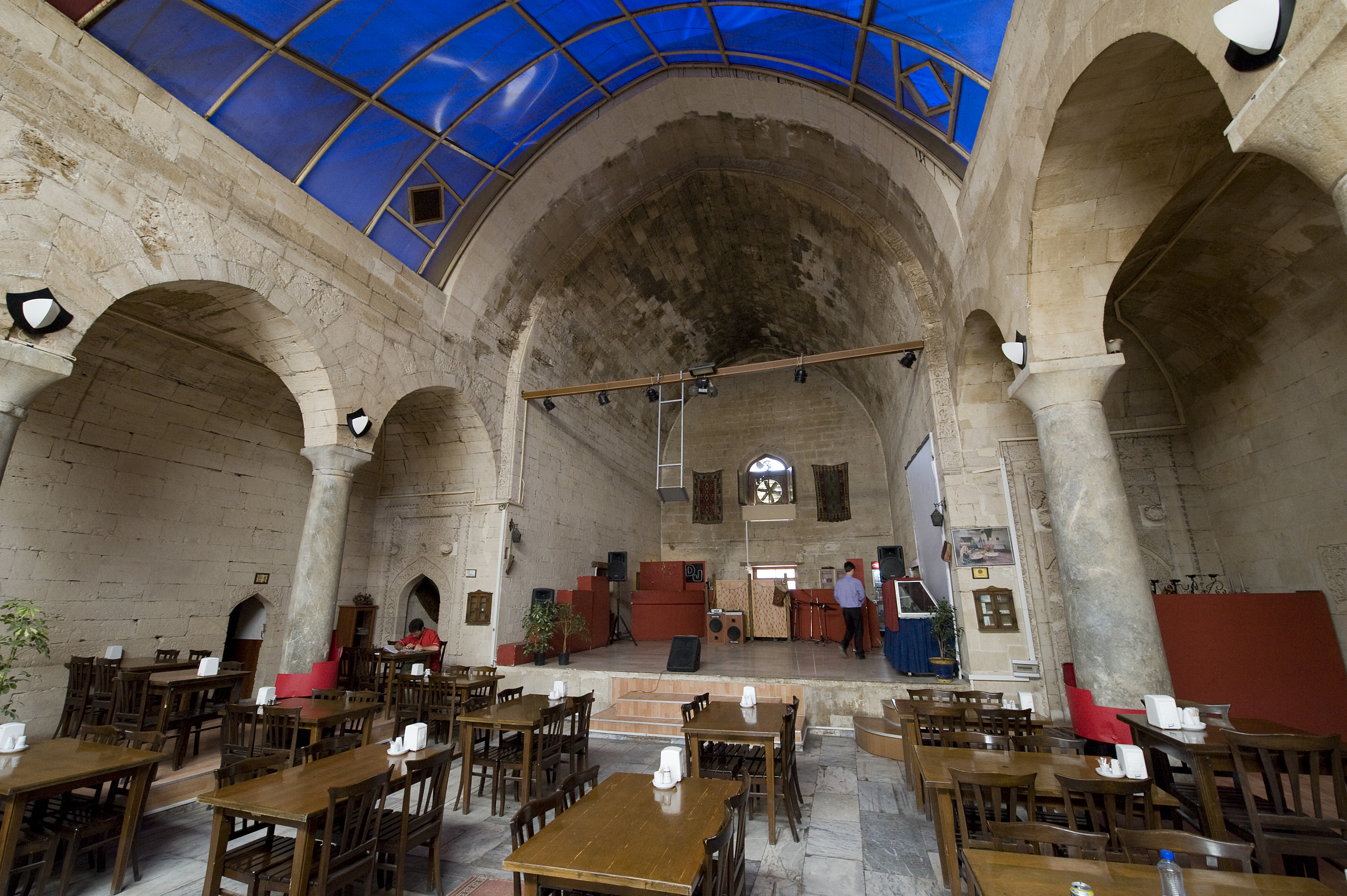
Karaman Medrese of Nefesi Sultan

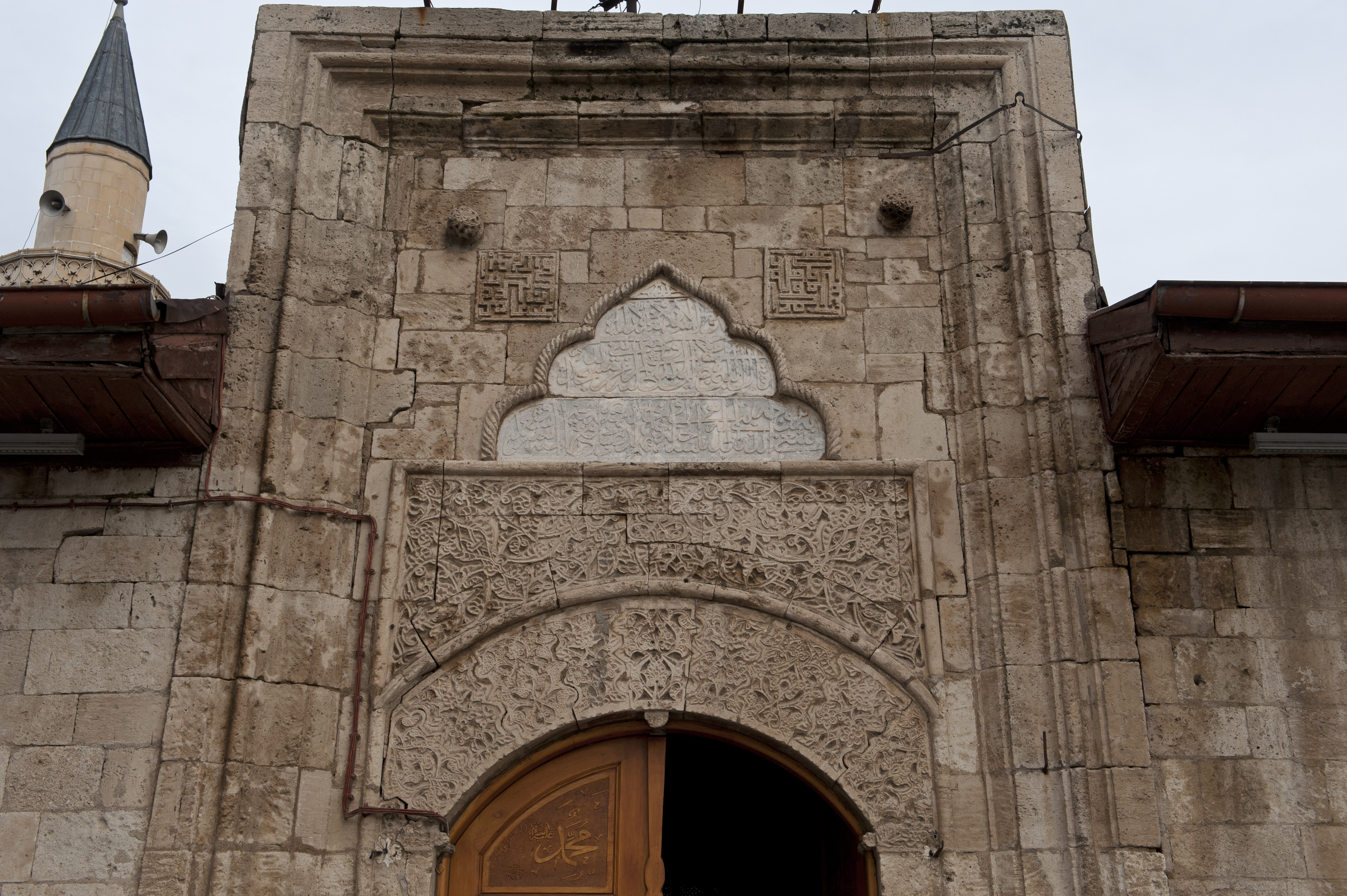
Karaman Hac Beyler Mosque Entrance

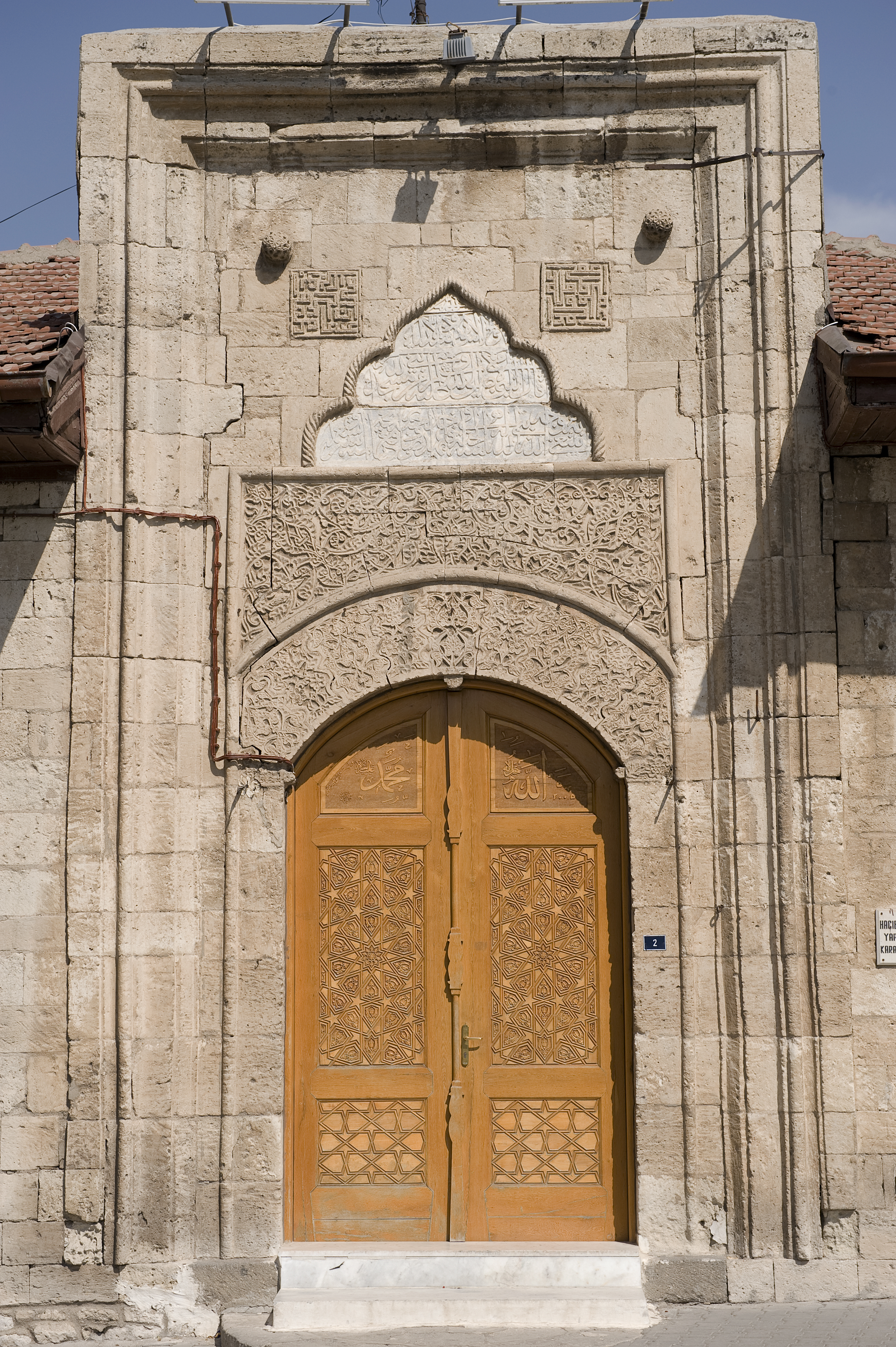
Karaman Haci Beyler Camisi entrance

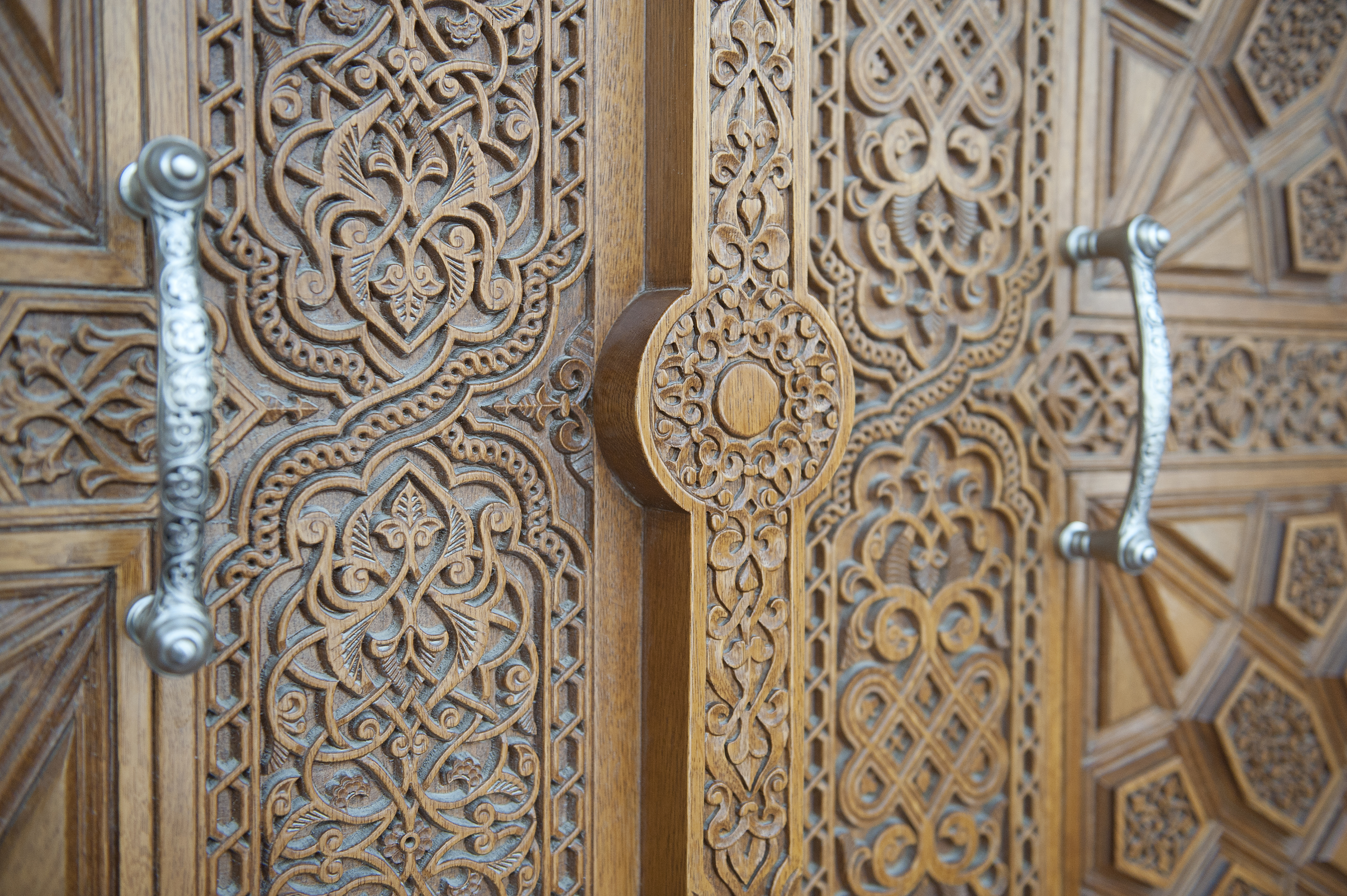
Karaman Ibrahim Bey Imareti door

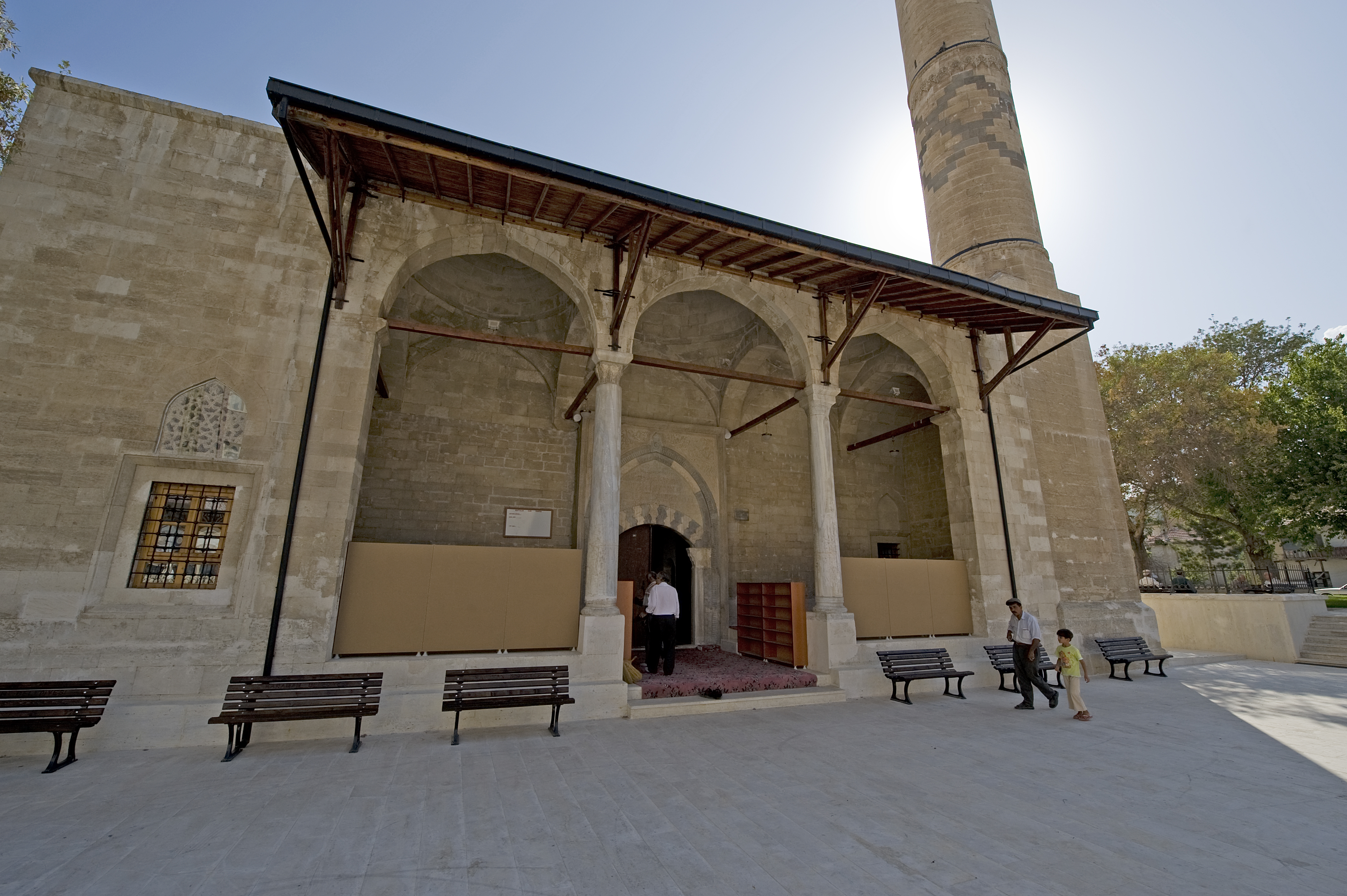
Karaman Ibrahim Bey Mosque

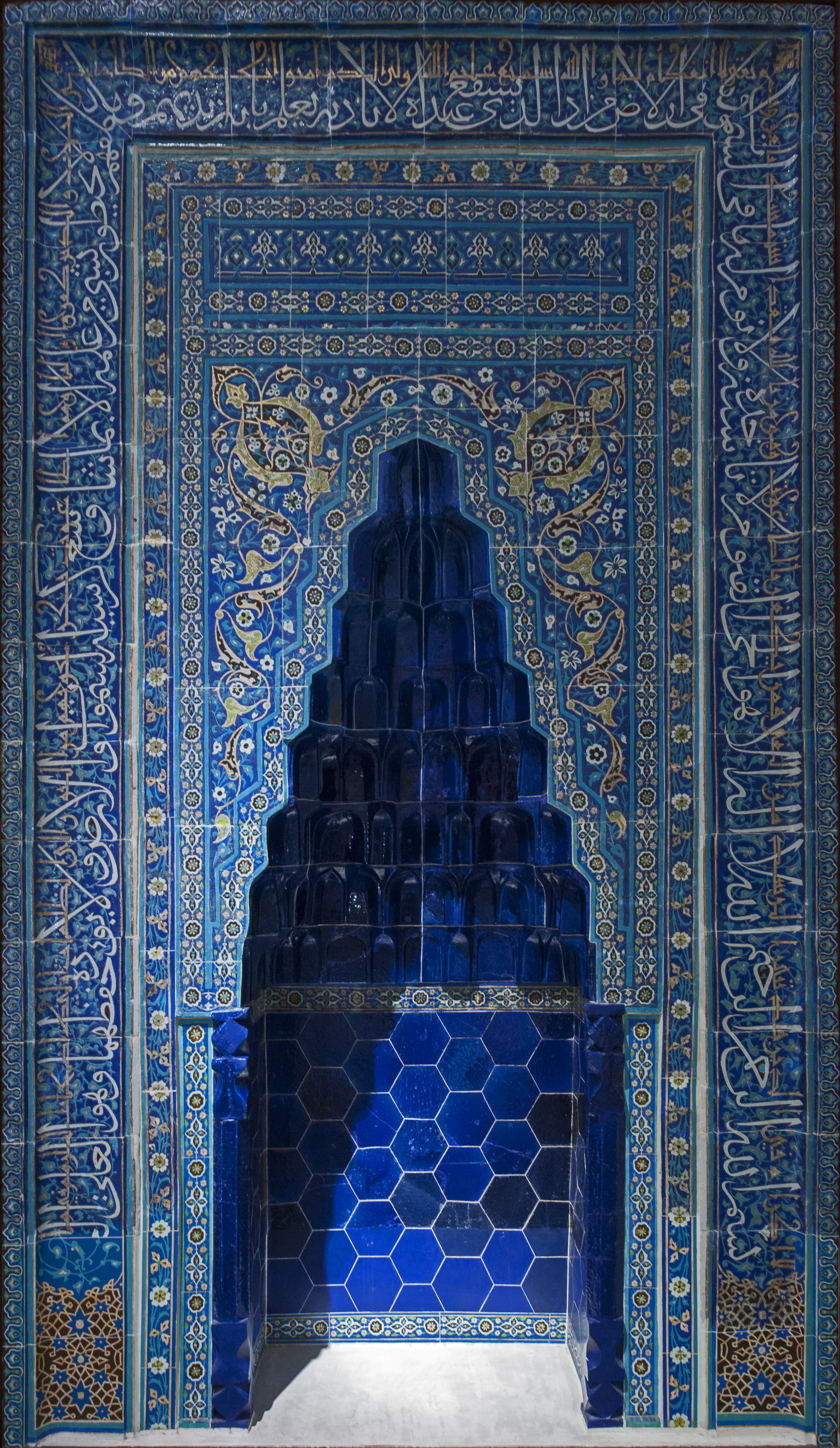
Ibrahim Bey Mihrab in Çinili Köşk

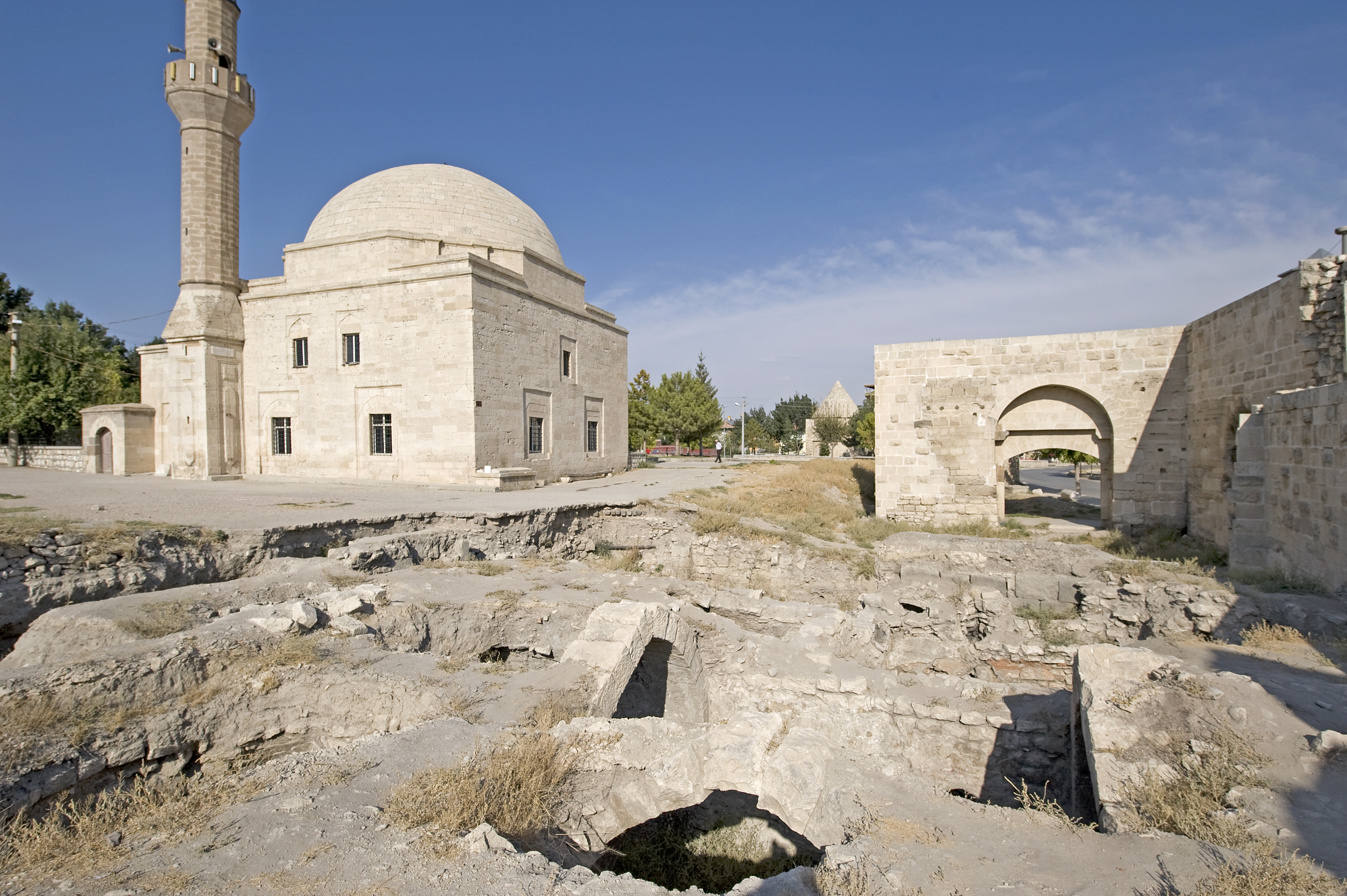
Karaman Castle Mosque and surroundings

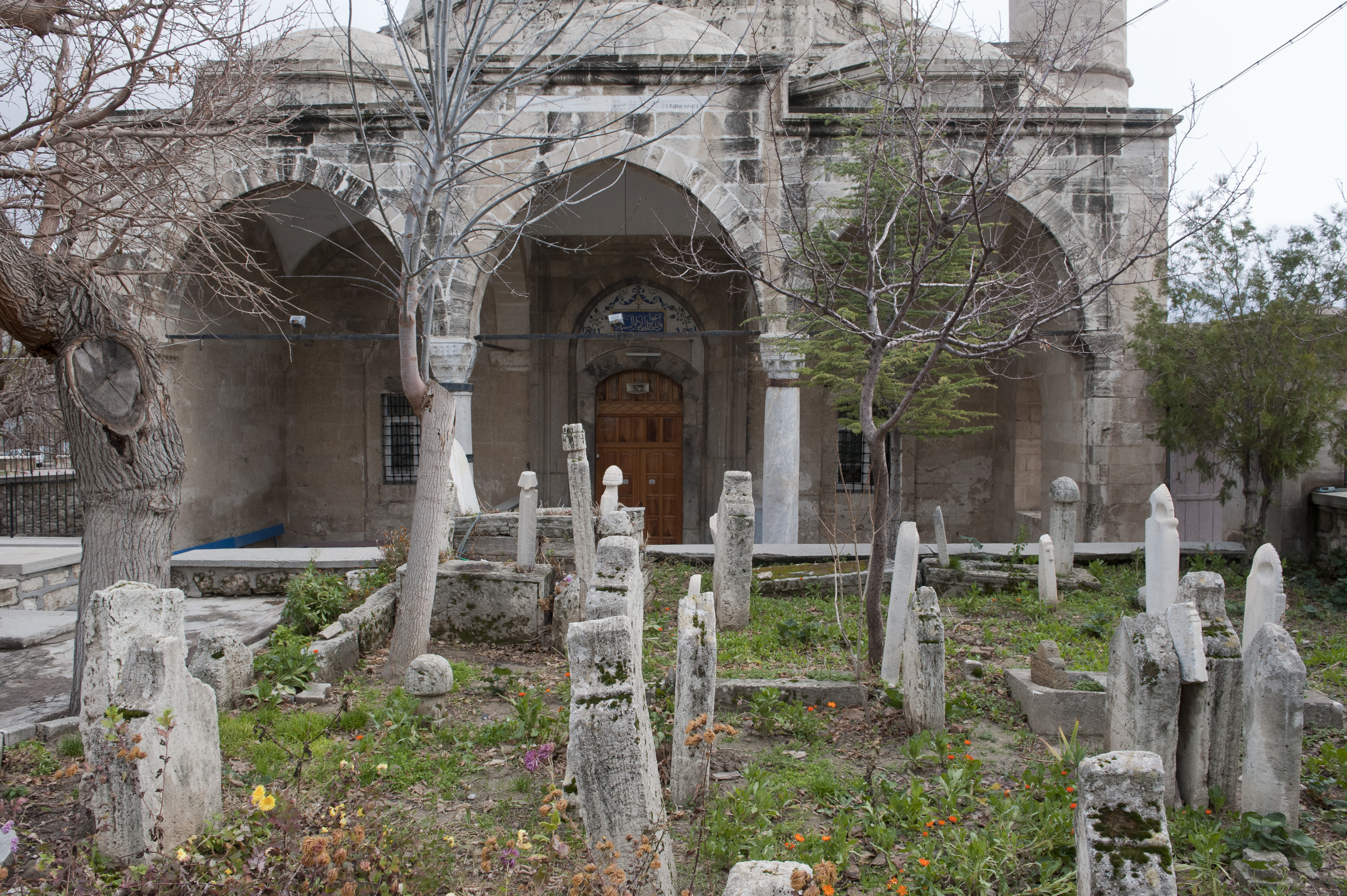
Karaman Castle mosque

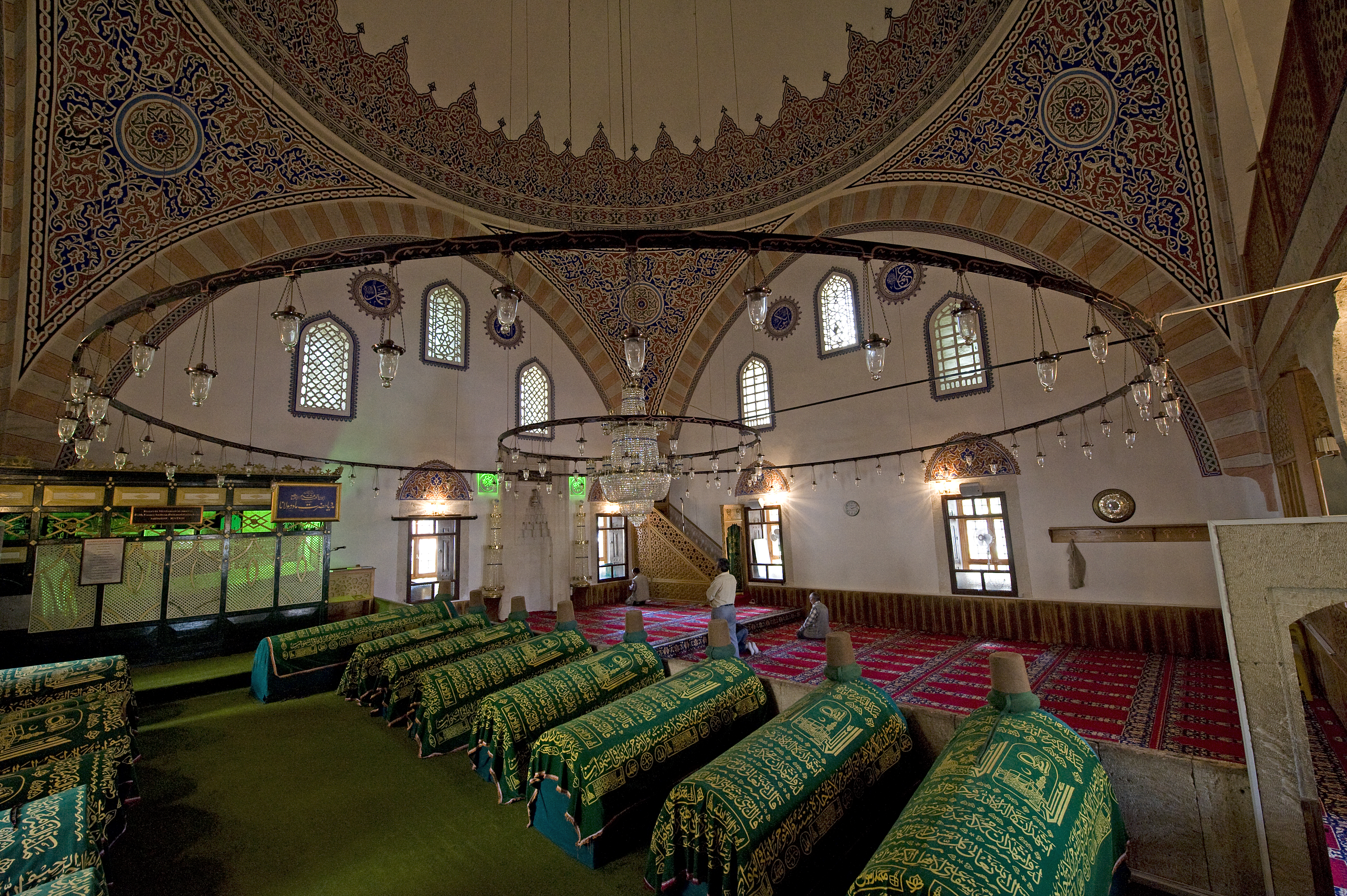
Karaman Ak Tekke interior

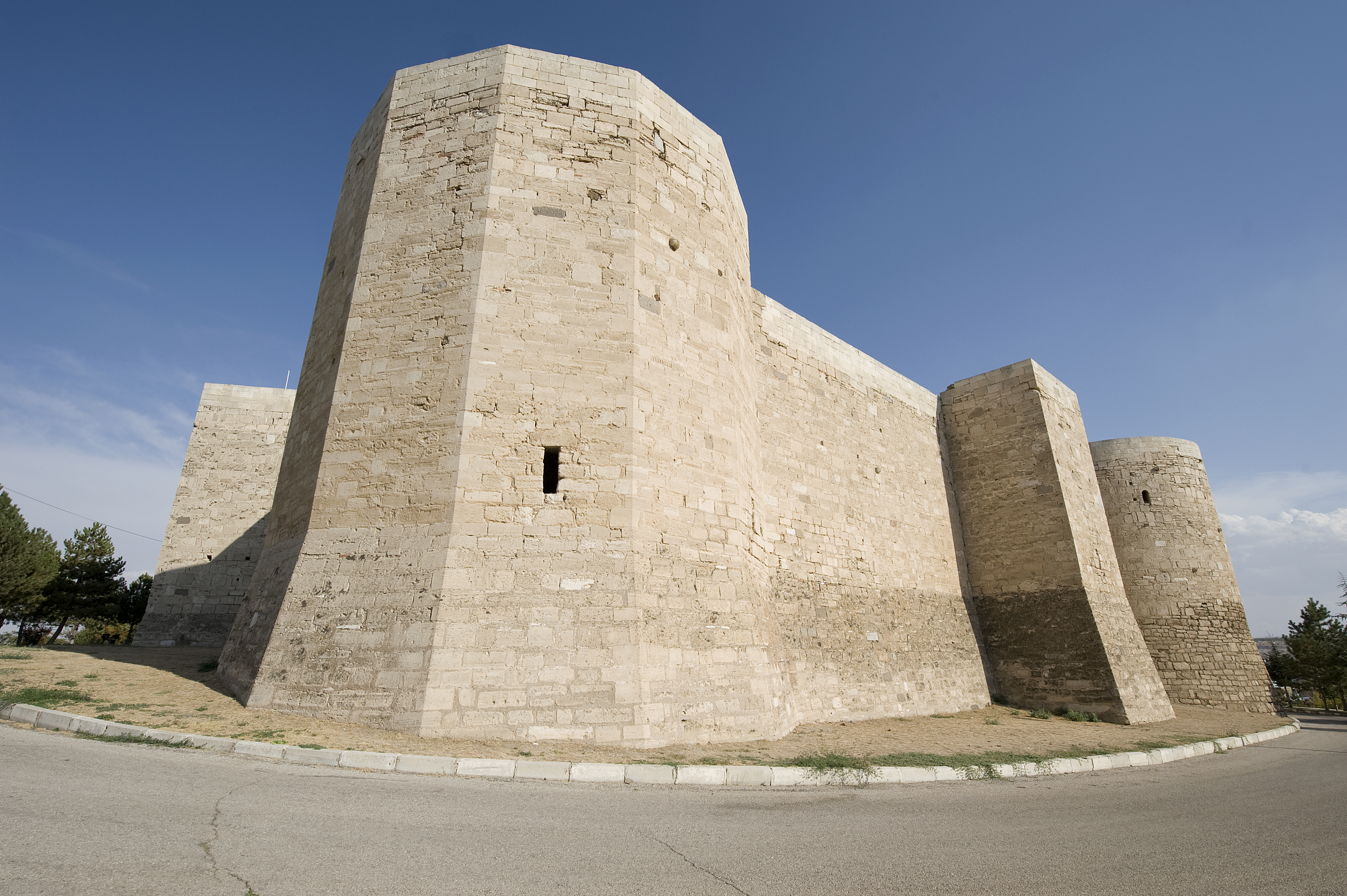
Karaman Castle Exterior

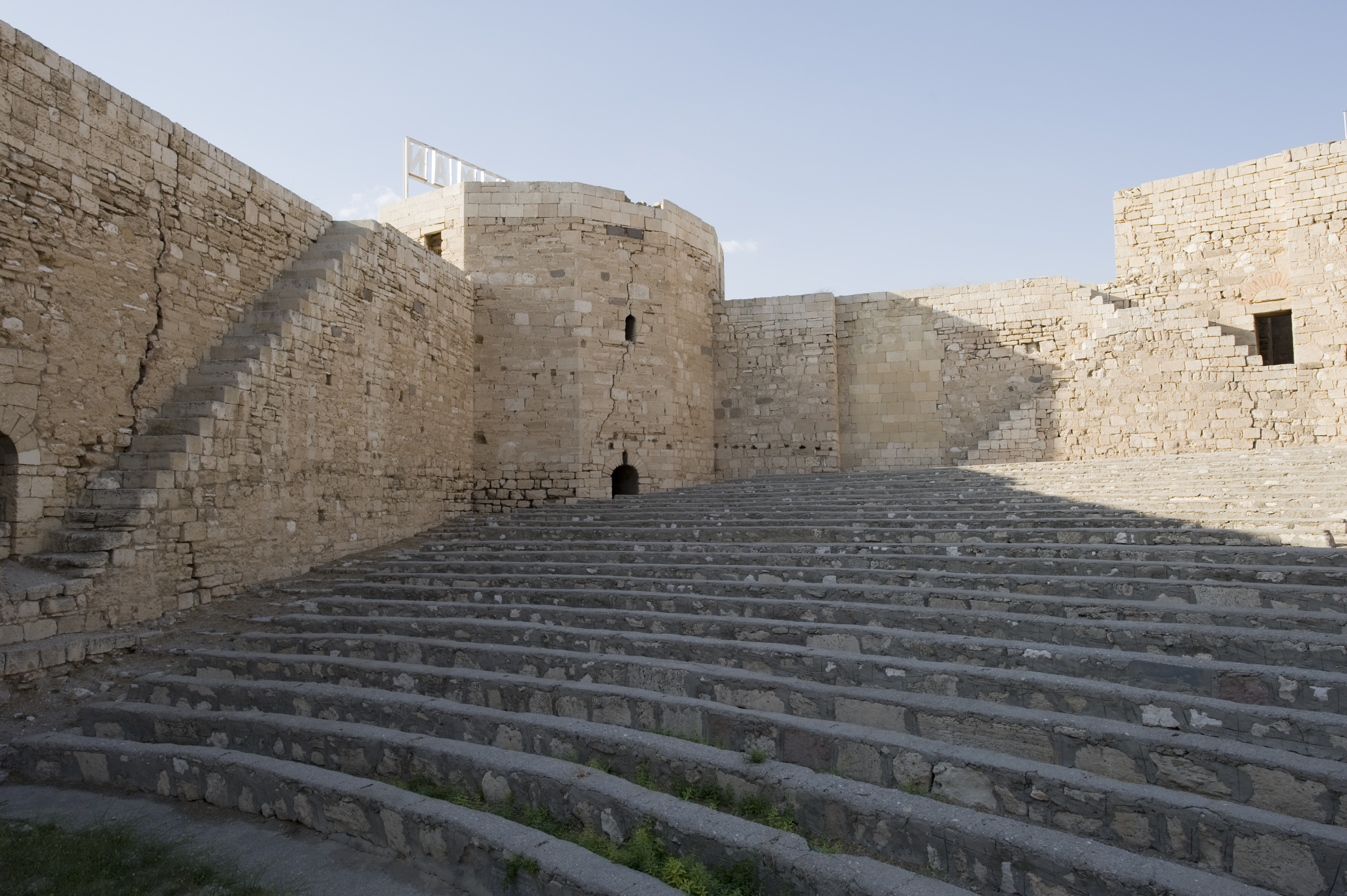
Karaman Castle Interior

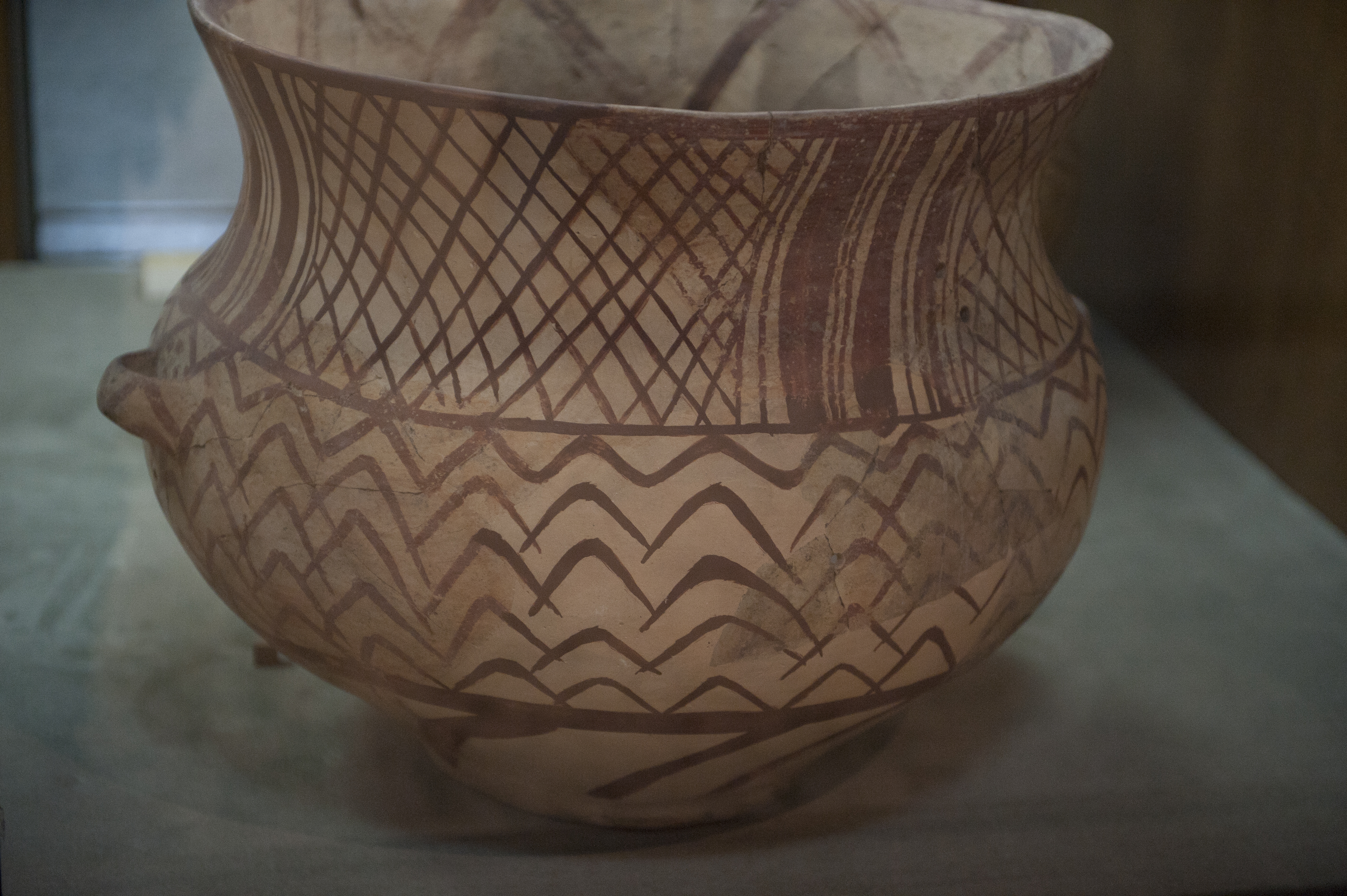
Karaman Museum Can Hasan I Pottery

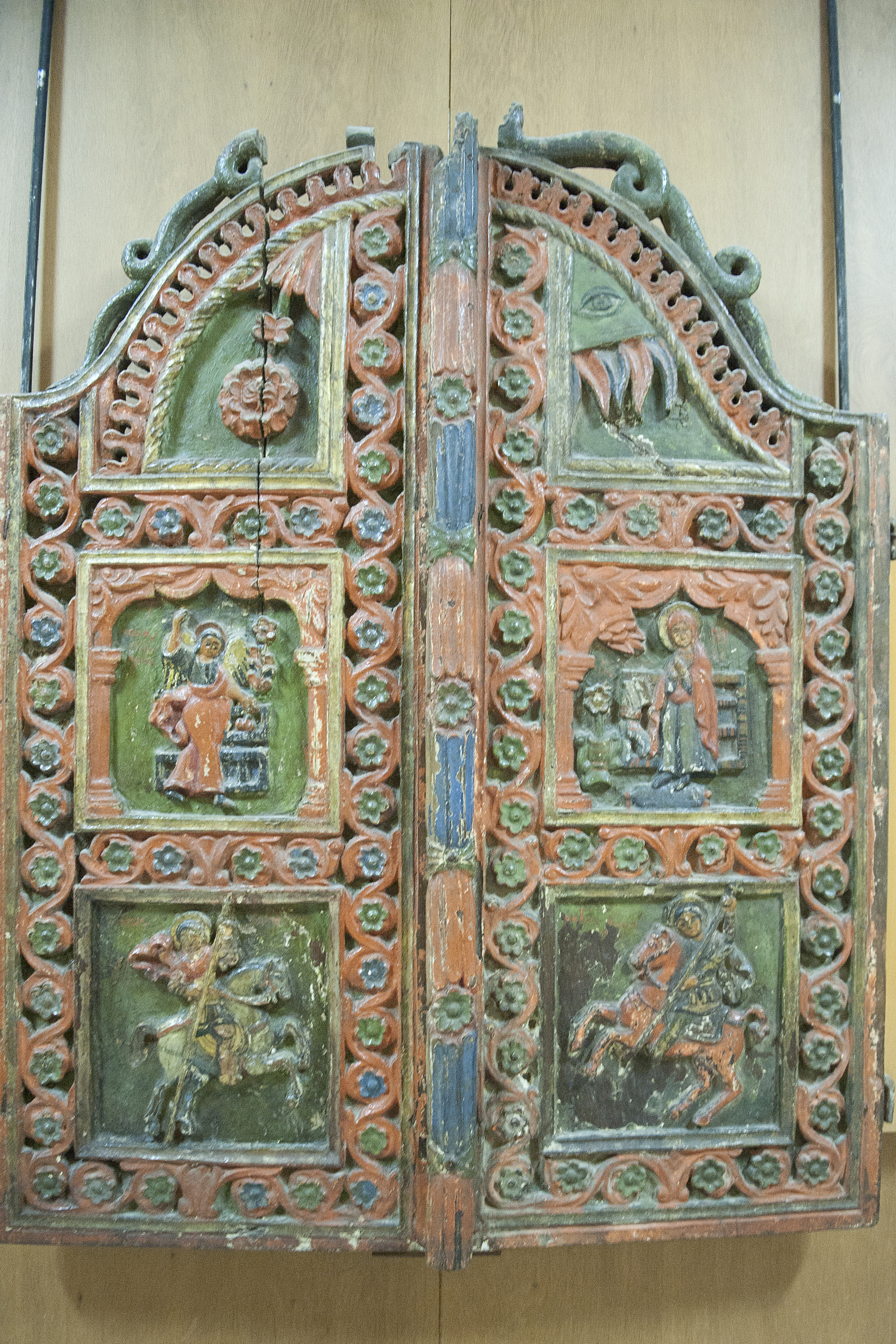
Karaman Museum Iconostasis doors

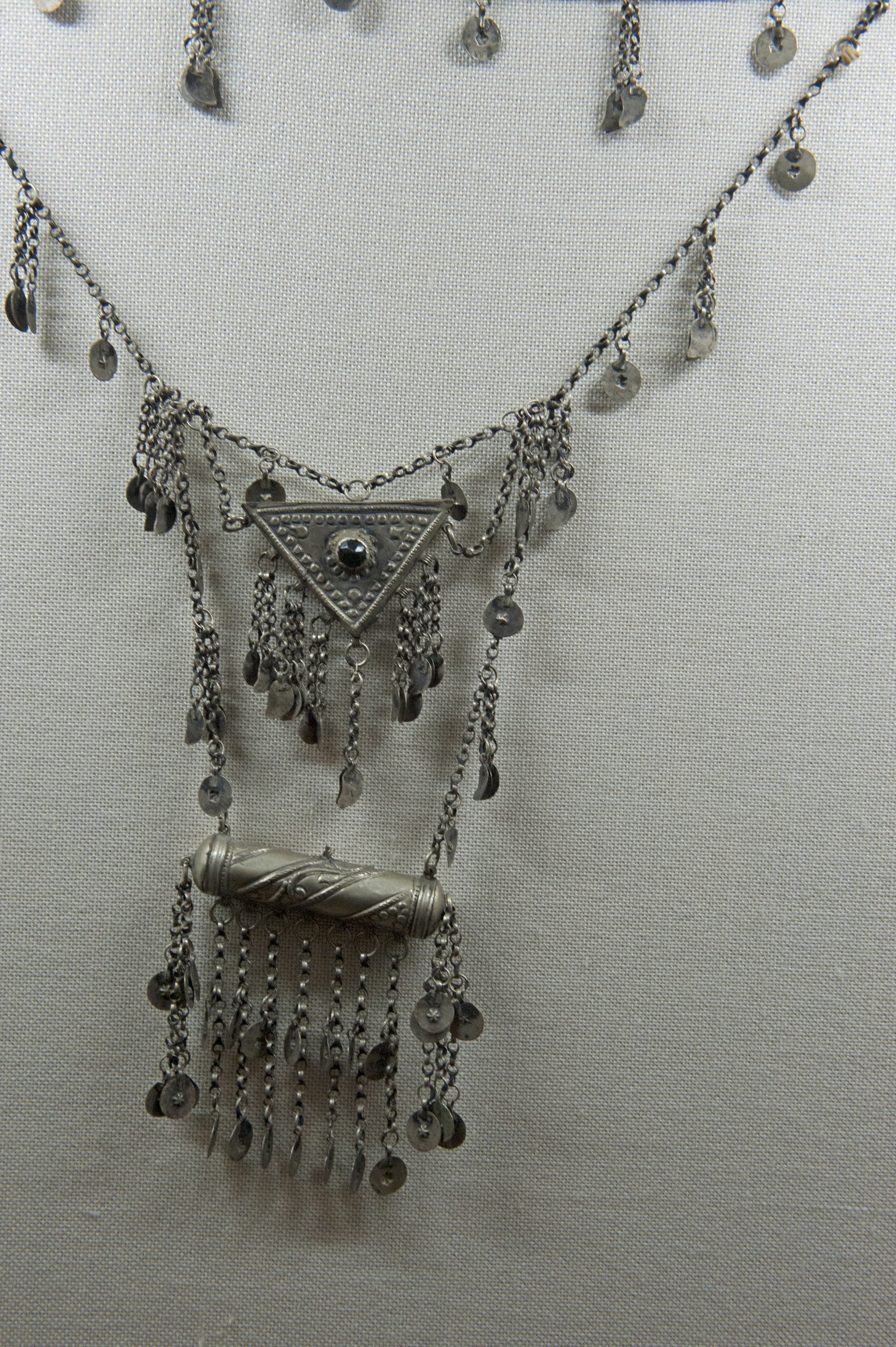
Karaman Museum Kadın fez süsü

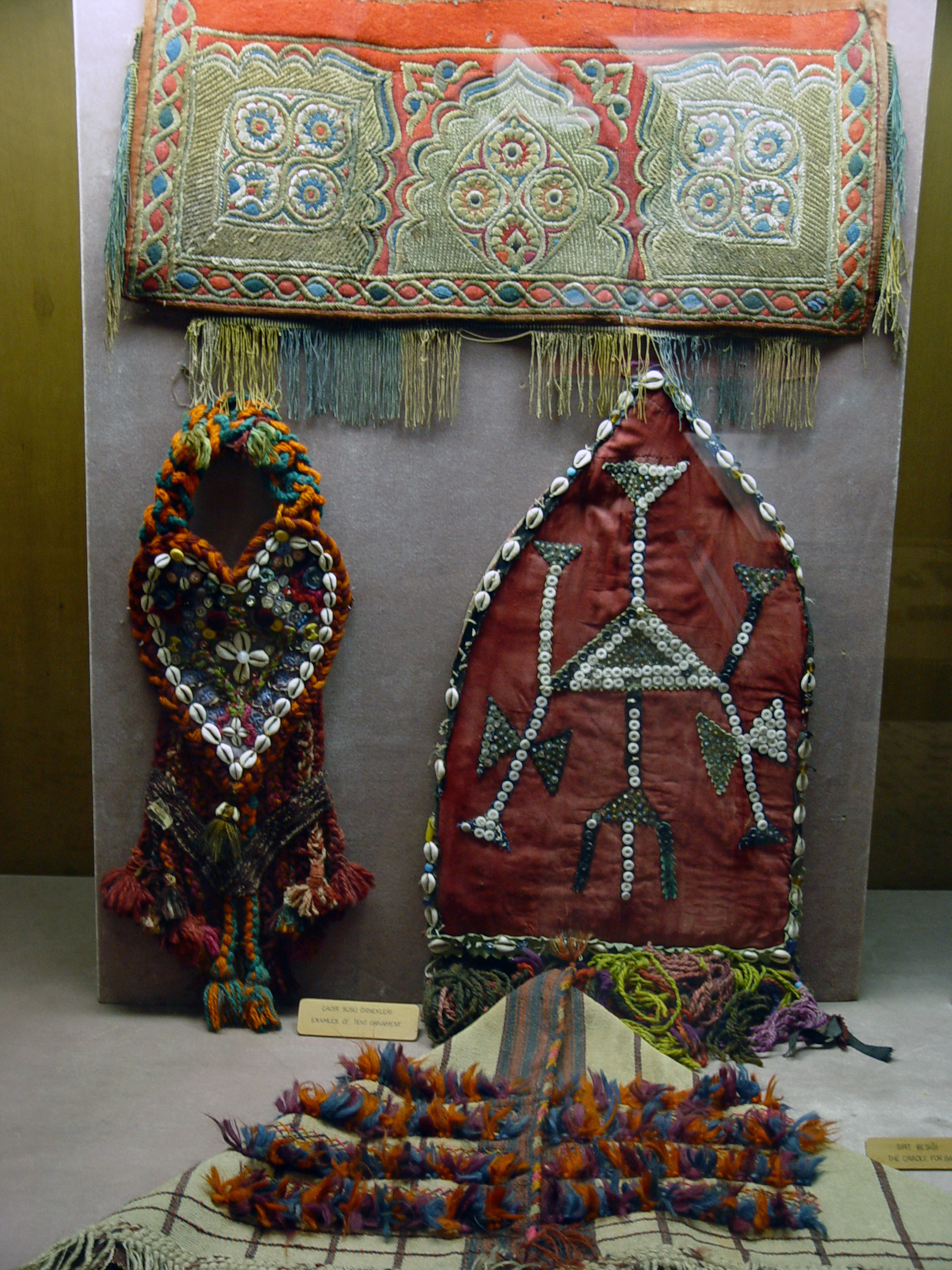
Karaman Museum Cowry shell adorned objects

== Climate ==
Karaman has a cold semi-arid climate under Köppen climate classification (BSk) and a humid continental climate under the Trewartha climate classification (Dc), with hot, dry summers and cold, snowy winters. Karaman is generally very sunny, with almost 3000 hours of sunshine per year.

Climate data for Karaman (1991–2020, extremes 1951–2023)
Month	Jan	Feb	Mar	Apr	May	Jun	Jul	Aug	Sep	Oct	Nov	Dec	Year
Record high °C (°F)	21.2 (70.2)	22.3 (72.1)	28.7 (83.7)	32.3 (90.1)	34.4 (93.9)	37.5 (99.5)	40.4 (104.7)	41.4 (106.5)	39.1 (102.4)	34.0 (93.2)	26.2 (79.2)	22.3 (72.1)	41.4 (106.5)
Mean daily maximum °C (°F)	5.6 (42.1)	7.5 (45.5)	12.9 (55.2)	18.3 (64.9)	23.7 (74.7)	28.3 (82.9)	31.7 (89.1)	31.7 (89.1)	27.7 (81.9)	21.3 (70.3)	13.5 (56.3)	7.5 (45.5)	19.1 (66.4)
Daily mean °C (°F)	0.7 (33.3)	2.1 (35.8)	6.7 (44.1)	11.7 (53.1)	16.6 (61.9)	20.8 (69.4)	24.0 (75.2)	23.7 (74.7)	19.5 (67.1)	13.8 (56.8)	6.8 (44.2)	2.5 (36.5)	12.4 (54.3)
Mean daily minimum °C (°F)	−3.4 (25.9)	−2.7 (27.1)	0.9 (33.6)	5.2 (41.4)	9.5 (49.1)	13.3 (55.9)	16.0 (60.8)	15.8 (60.4)	11.3 (52.3)	6.7 (44.1)	1.0 (33.8)	−1.7 (28.9)	6.0 (42.8)
Record low °C (°F)	−26.8 (−16.2)	−28.0 (−18.4)	−20.2 (−4.4)	−8.3 (17.1)	−3.1 (26.4)	3.1 (37.6)	6.4 (43.5)	3.6 (38.5)	−1.0 (30.2)	−8.5 (16.7)	−21.2 (−6.2)	−26.1 (−15.0)	−28.0 (−18.4)
Average precipitation mm (inches)	41.8 (1.65)	33.7 (1.33)	33.6 (1.32)	32.1 (1.26)	34.0 (1.34)	28.0 (1.10)	6.7 (0.26)	8.7 (0.34)	9.2 (0.36)	25.8 (1.02)	32.9 (1.30)	48.8 (1.92)	335.3 (13.20)
Average precipitation days	10.27	8.93	9.03	7.97	8.6	5.67	1.27	1.27	2	5.1	5.8	9.77	75.68
Average relative humidity (%)	74.6	70.1	60.2	54.9	52.4	47.4	41.2	42.9	47.3	57.3	67.1	73.8	57.4
Mean monthly sunshine hours	105.4	127.1	189.1	234.0	297.6	342.0	387.5	356.5	294.0	229.4	159.0	99.2	2,820.8
Mean daily sunshine hours	3.4	4.5	6.1	7.8	9.6	11.4	12.5	11.5	9.8	7.4	5.3	3.2	7.7
Source 1: Turkish State Meteorological Service
Source 2: NOAA (humidity)

== Mayors of Karaman ==
- 1984-1989 Hasan Özkaymak ANAP
- 1989-1999 Yaşar Evcen SHP, CHP
- 1999-2004 Halil İbrahim Gülcan MHP
- 2004-2009 Ali Kantürk AK Party
- 2009-2014 Kamil Uğurlu AK Party
- 2014-2019 Ertuğrul Çalışkan AK Party
- 2019-present Savaş Kalaycı MHP

== Twin towns – sister cities ==
Karaman is twinned with:

- Şeki, Azerbaijan
- Beyarmudu, Northern Cyprus
- Kütahya, Turkey

== See also ==
- Anatolian Tigers
