= Nestor of Laranda =

Greek poet (2nd-3rd century AD)

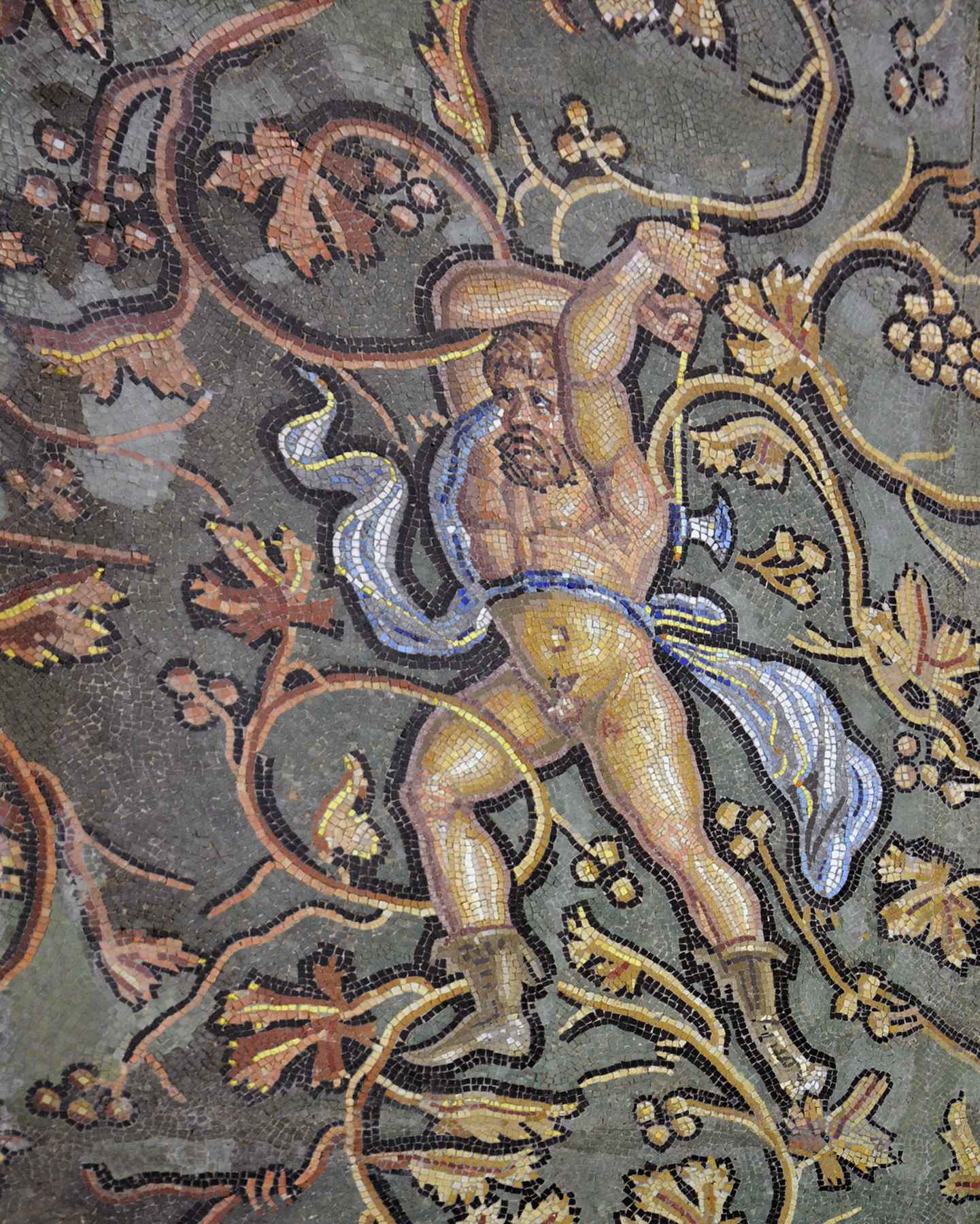
A late second-century AD mosaic from Sainte-Colombe depicting the punishment of Lycurgus, a myth which figured in Nestor's Alexicepus

Lucius Septimius Nestor (Ancient Greek: Λεύκιος Σεπτίμιος Νέστωρ) also known as Nestor of Laranda (Νέστωρ Λαρανδεύς), was a Greek poet who lived during the late-second and early-third centuries AD. According to Stephanus Byzantinus and the Suda he was from the city of Laranda (now Karaman) in Lycaonia.

He composed learned poetry on a variety of subjects in the tradition of Hellenistic poets like Nicander and Parthenius of Nicaea, but his magnum opus was perhaps the lipogrammatic Iliad, a work which would have been a showpiece for his poetic virtuosity and knowledge of Homeric scholarship. Although his fame was great during his lifetime, little survives of Nestor's poetry today, but its influence may be recognized in Nonnus' Dionysiaca, which appears also to have drawn upon the work of Nestor's son Peisander.

== Works ==
The Suda attributes two poems to Nestor by name, a lipogrammatic Iliad (Ἰλιὰς λειπογράμματος, Iliàs leipográmmatos) and a Metamorphoses (Μεταμορφώσεις), and notes that Nestor also wrote other poems. Several verbatim fragments of the Metamorphoses are transmitted in the Greek Anthology. No fragments of the Ilias leipogrammatos survive, but the poem will have concerned the Trojan War much like Homer's Iliad, with at least one notable difference: the letter denoting each book's number would not have been used in its text; the first book, for example, would not include the letter alpha (α) which was used to denote the numeral 1.

Two works of medical didactic poetry are also attested for Nestor by the Geoponica: the Alexicepus (Ἀλεξίκηπος, Alexíkēpos), or Garden of Defence, and Panacea (Πανάκεια, Panákeia). The Alexicepus will have belonged to the tradition of Nicander's Alexipharmaca.

An Alexandreiad (Ἀλεξανδρείας, Alexandreiás), meaning "On the deeds of Alexander", attributed to a "Nestor" by Stephanus of Byzantium, who cited the poem for toponyms, was probably the work of this poet. If so, the poem might have been composed in honor of Alexander Severus, though Jacoby thought the Alexander of the title to be Alexander the Great.

== Bibliography ==
- Denniston, J.D. (1996), "Septimius Nestor, Lucius", in S. Hornblower; A. Spawforth (eds.), Oxford Classical Dictionary (3rd rev. ed.), Oxford, ISBN 9780198661726.
- Fornaro, S. (2007), "Peisandor (10)", in H. Cancik; H. Schneider (eds.), Brill's New Pauly: Antiquity, vol. 10 (Obl-Phe), ISBN 9789004142152.
- Hunter, R.L. (1996), "Pisander (3)", in S. Hornblower; A. Spawforth (eds.), Oxford Classical Dictionary (3rd rev. ed.), Oxford, ISBN 9780198661726.
- Keydell, R. (1935), "R. Keydell, Die Dichter mit Namen Peisandros", Hermes, 70: 301–11, JSTOR 4474419.
- Latacz, J. (2006), "Nestor (3)", in H. Cancik; H. Schneider (eds.), Brill's New Pauly: Antiquity, vol. 9 (Mini-Obe), ISBN 9789004122727.
- Ma, J., "The Worlds of Nestor the Poet", in Swain; Harrison; Elsner (eds.), Severan Culture, pp. 83–113.
- Miguélez Cavero, L. (2008), Poems in context Greek poetry in the Egyptian Thebaid 200–600 AD, Berlin, ISBN 9783110202731.
- Swain, S.; Harrison, S.; Elsner, J. (2007), Severan Culture, Cambridge, ISBN 9780521859820.
