= Karaman Castle =

Fortification in Karaman, Turkey

- Karaman Kalesi
- Karaman, Turkey
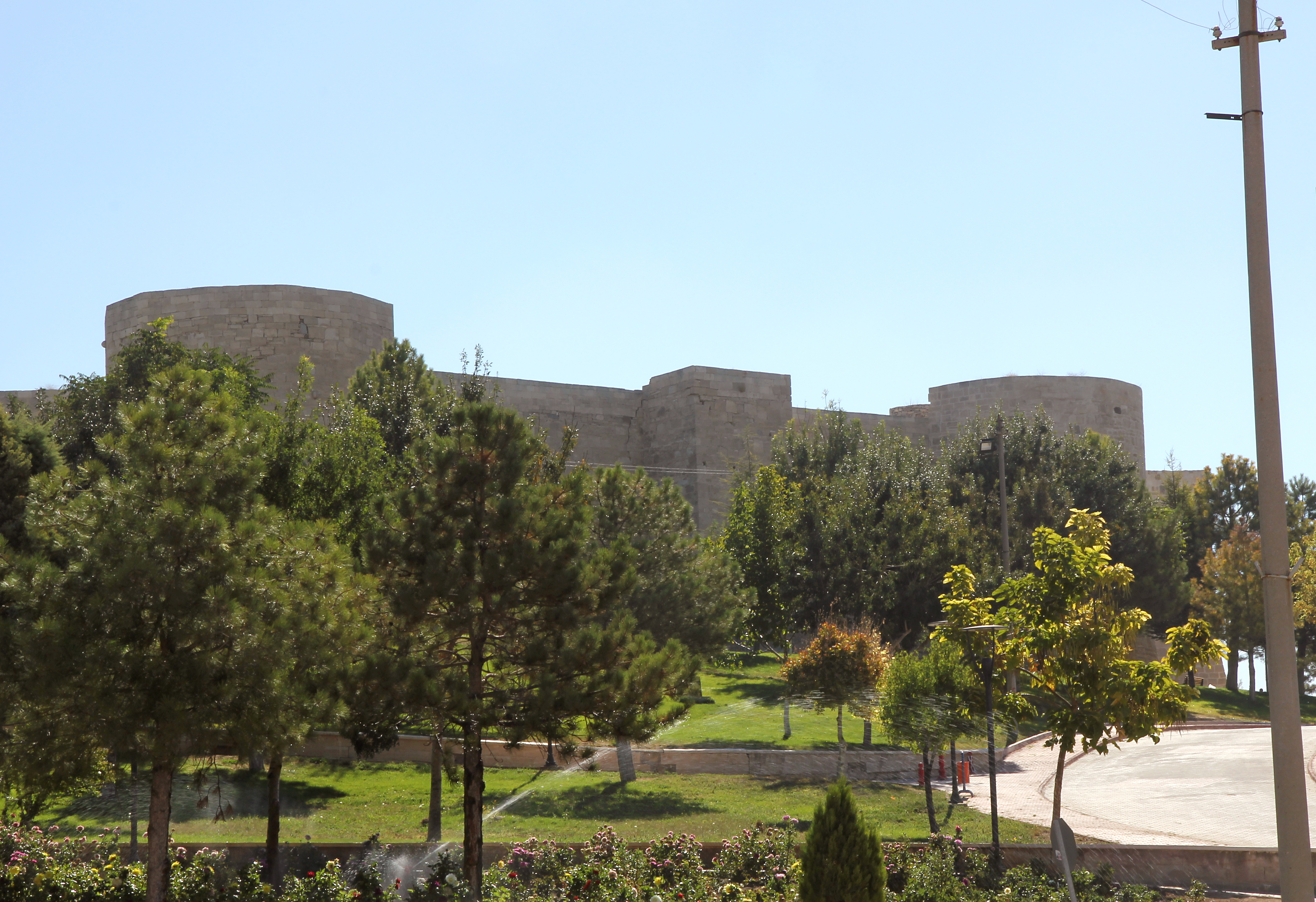
- Karaman castle

Site information
- Type: Fortress
- Open to the public: Yes
- Condition: Generally standing

Location
- Coordinates: 37°10′55″N 33°12′26″E

Site history
- Built: 11th century
- Built by: Byzantine Empire
- Materials: Stone

Karaman Castle (Turkish: Karaman Kalesi) is a partly ruined castle in the city of Karaman, central Turkey.

It is believed that the castle was built in the late 11th or early 12th century.

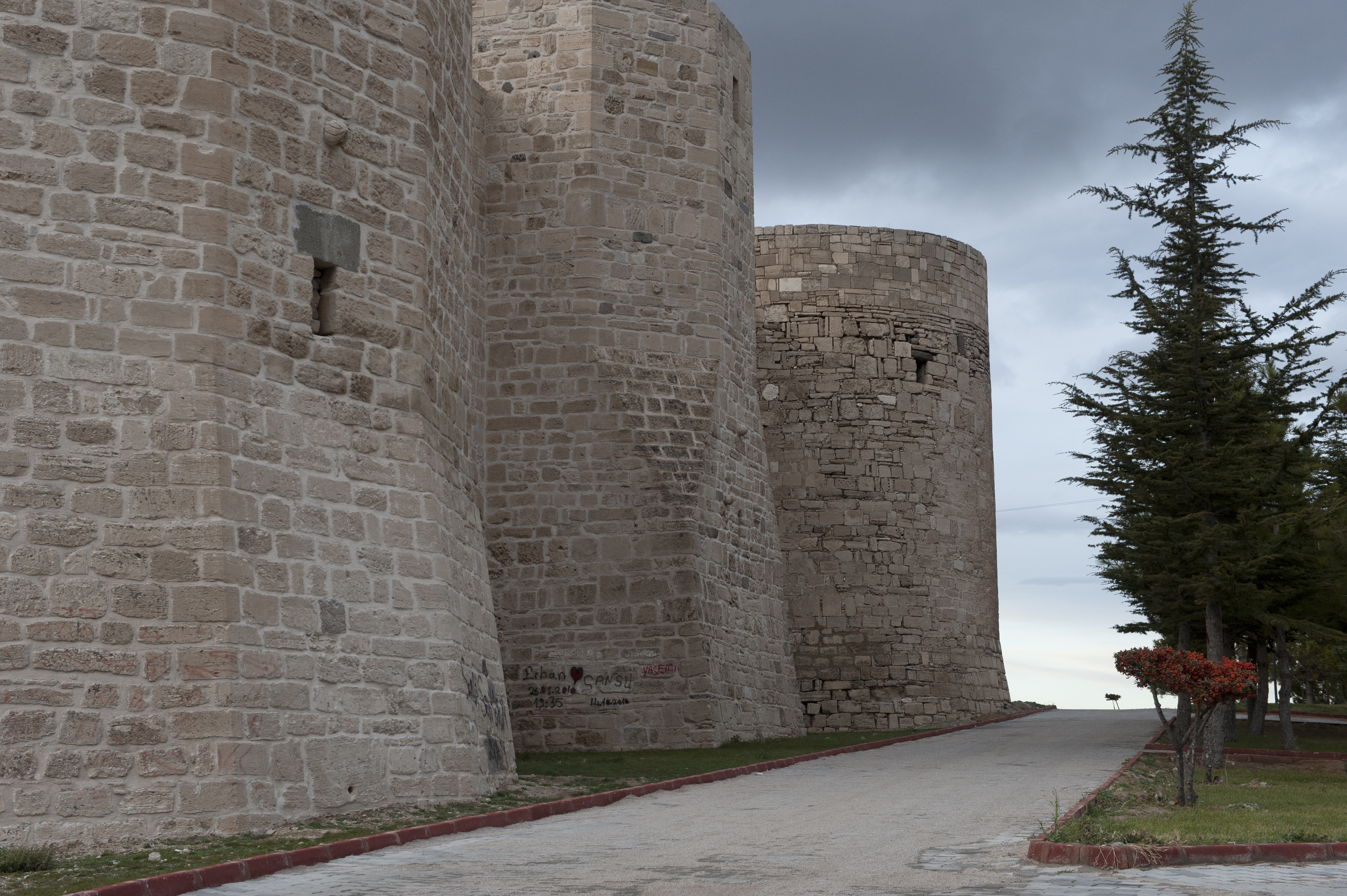
Walls of the İçkale (Inner castle).

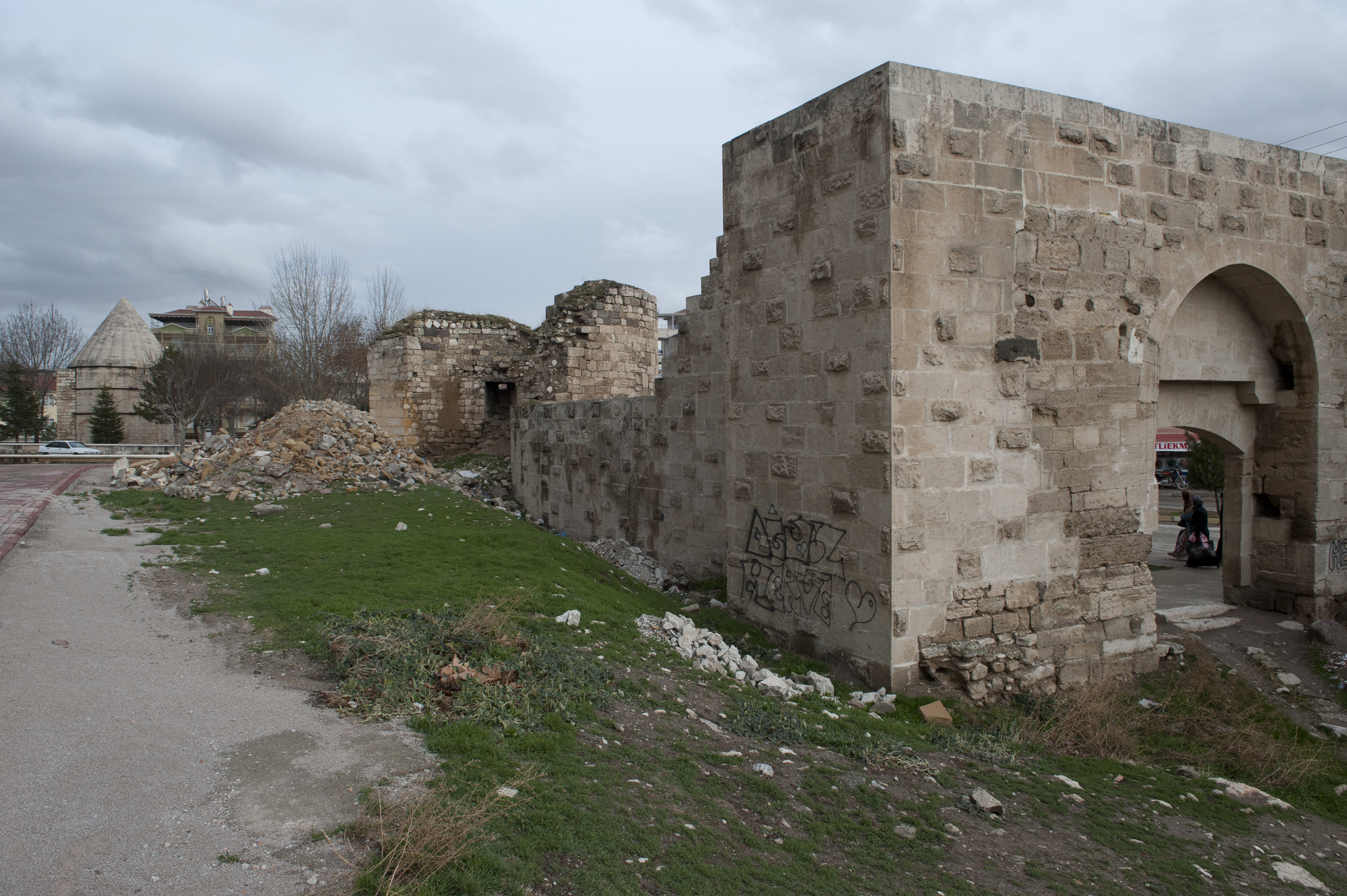
Walls of the Ortakale (Middle castle).

The castle consists of three concentric ramparts, called theDışkale ( outer), Ortakale (middle) and İçkale (inner) one. The innermost rampart is situated on a tumulus, which bears the traces of Bronze Age and the periods of Roman and Byzantine Empire. Archaeological excavations at the tumulus, which started in 2013, has revealed architectural structures.

The citadel has nine bastions, four circular and five rectangular.

According to the travel book Seyahatnâme of Evliya Çelebi (1611–1682), there were 32 neighborhoods and 53 mihrabs (mosques, masjids) and madrasas as well as 7,080 mud houses, 23 fountains, 3 soup kitchens, and 3 hamams within the castle.

The castle was renovated during the Seljuk Empire period, and the city walls were renewed again when the city came under Karamanids rule (mid 14th century-15th century). Before the repairs and restorations by the Ottoman Empire in 1463, the inscriptions and architectural pieces of demolished buildings were used for the body walls of the castle. The citadel has survived until today. Only some parts of the middle castle walls, which surround the tumulus, has survived also.
