= Peisander of Laranda =

Greek poet (3rd century AD)

Peisander or Pisander of Laranda (/paɪˈsændər, ˈpaɪˌsændər/; Ancient Greek: Πείσανδρος ὁ Λαρανδινός, Peísandros ho Larandinós) was a Greek poet who flourished during the reign of Alexander Severus (222–235 AD). He wrote a sixty-book epic called the Heroikai Theogamiai (Ἡρωικαὶ θεογαμίαι, "Heroic Marriages of the Gods") which, like the poetry of his father Nestor of Laranda, appears to have influenced Nonnus' Dionysiaca. Peisander's poem, of which only small fragments survive as quotations in other authors, amounted to "a comprehensive epic on world history". Among the extant fragments, there is mention of Io, Cadmus and the Argonauts, but the most significant fragment is the testimony of Macrobius that states that Peisander's history of the world began from the marriage of Zeus and Hera.

== Bibliography ==
- Denniston, J.D. (1996), "Septimius Nestor, Lucius", in S. Hornblower; A. Spawforth (eds.), Oxford Classical Dictionary (3rd rev. ed.), Oxford, ISBN 9780198661726.
- Fornaro, S. (2007), "Peisandros (10)", in H. Cancik; H. Schneider (eds.), Brill's New Pauly: Antiquity, vol. 10 (Obl-Phe), ISBN 9789004142152.
- Hunter, R.L. (1996), "Pisander (3)", in S. Hornblower; A. Spawforth (eds.), Oxford Classical Dictionary (3rd rev. ed.), Oxford, ISBN 9780198661726.
- Keydell, R. (1935), "R. Keydell, Die Dichter mit Namen Peisandros", Hermes, 70: 301–11, JSTOR 4474419.
- Latacz, J. (2006), "Nestor (3)", in H. Cancik; H. Schneider (eds.), Brill's New Pauly: Antiquity, vol. 9 (Mini-Obe), ISBN 9789004122727.
- Miguélez Cavero, L. (2008), Poems in context Greek poetry in the Egyptian Thebaid 200–600 AD, Berlin, ISBN 9783110202731.
