= Kocaeli Museum =

Archaeology museum in Kocaeli, Turkey

- Kocaeli Müzesi
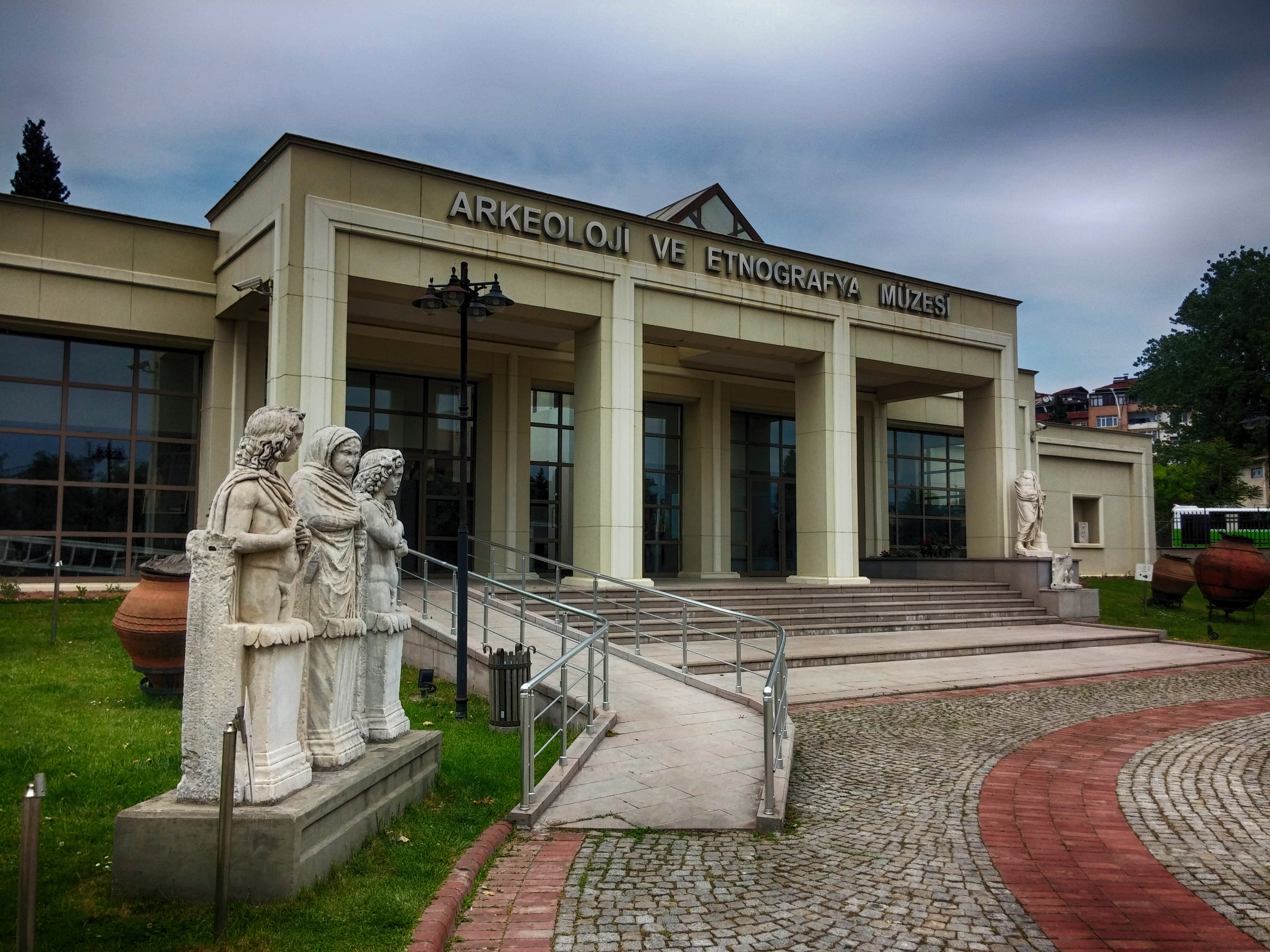

- Location of Kocaeli Museum in Turkey
- Established: 2006; 20 years ago
- Location: Demiryolu Caddesi, Kemalpaşa, Kocaeli, Turkey
- Coordinates: 40°45′45″N 29°54′57″E
- Type: Archaeology, ethnography
- Collections: Hellenistic, Roman, Byzantine, Ottoman periods
- Collection size: 1,965 archaeological, 1,549 ethnographic, 5,155 coins
- Owner: Ministry of Culture and Tourism

Kocaeli Museum, a.k.a. Kocaeli Archaeology and Ethnography Museum or İzmit Museum, (Turkish: Kocaeli Müzesi) is a national museum in Kocaeli (İzmit), northwestern Turkey, exhibiting archaeological artifacts and ethnographic objects. It is housed in the former railway station of İzmit.

The museum is situated on İstasyon St. in Kozlu neighborhood of İzmit.

The railway station was designed by German architect Otto Ritter, and built between 1873 and 1910. The facility covers an area of 21 daa (5.2 acres). The railway station became defunct after the course of the railway, which ran along the coast of Marmara Sea and passed through the city center, was changed to run north of the city.

After restoration works for redevelopment, which began in 2004, the former railway station was opened early 2007. The museum consists of 1,965 archaeological, 1,549 ethnographic objects and 5,155 coins. In addition to the exhibition halls, there is a 130-seated conference room and a laboratory. The museum objects are partly exhibited in the museum halls and partly open-air in the museum yard. A steam locomotive and two railroad cars, redesigned as cafeteria and restaurant and situated in front of the museum, serve the visitors.

In the museum halls, artifacts from Paleolithic, Hellenic, Roman, Byzantine and Ottoman era are exhibited.

== Gallery ==
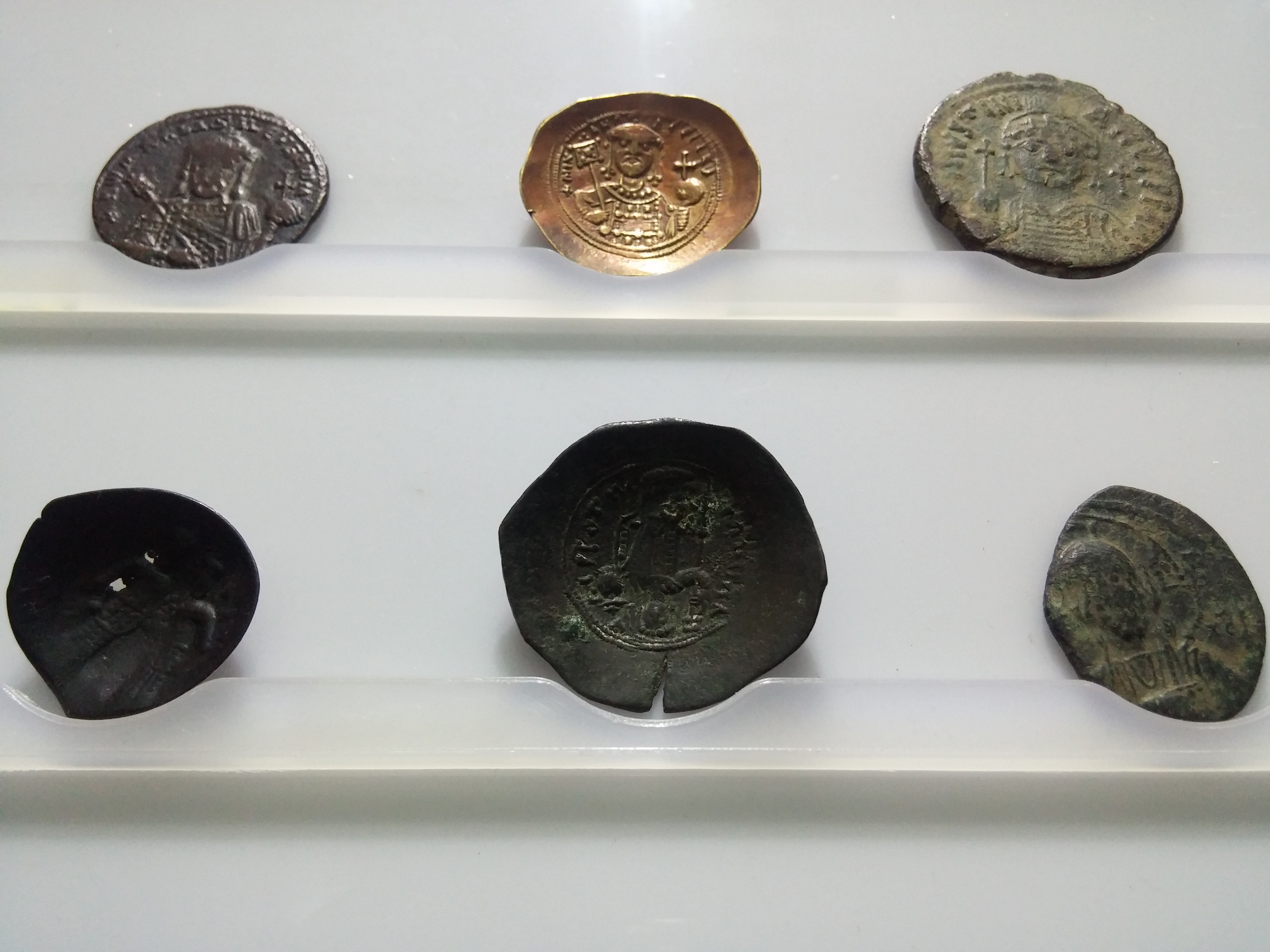
Coins from Roman Empire

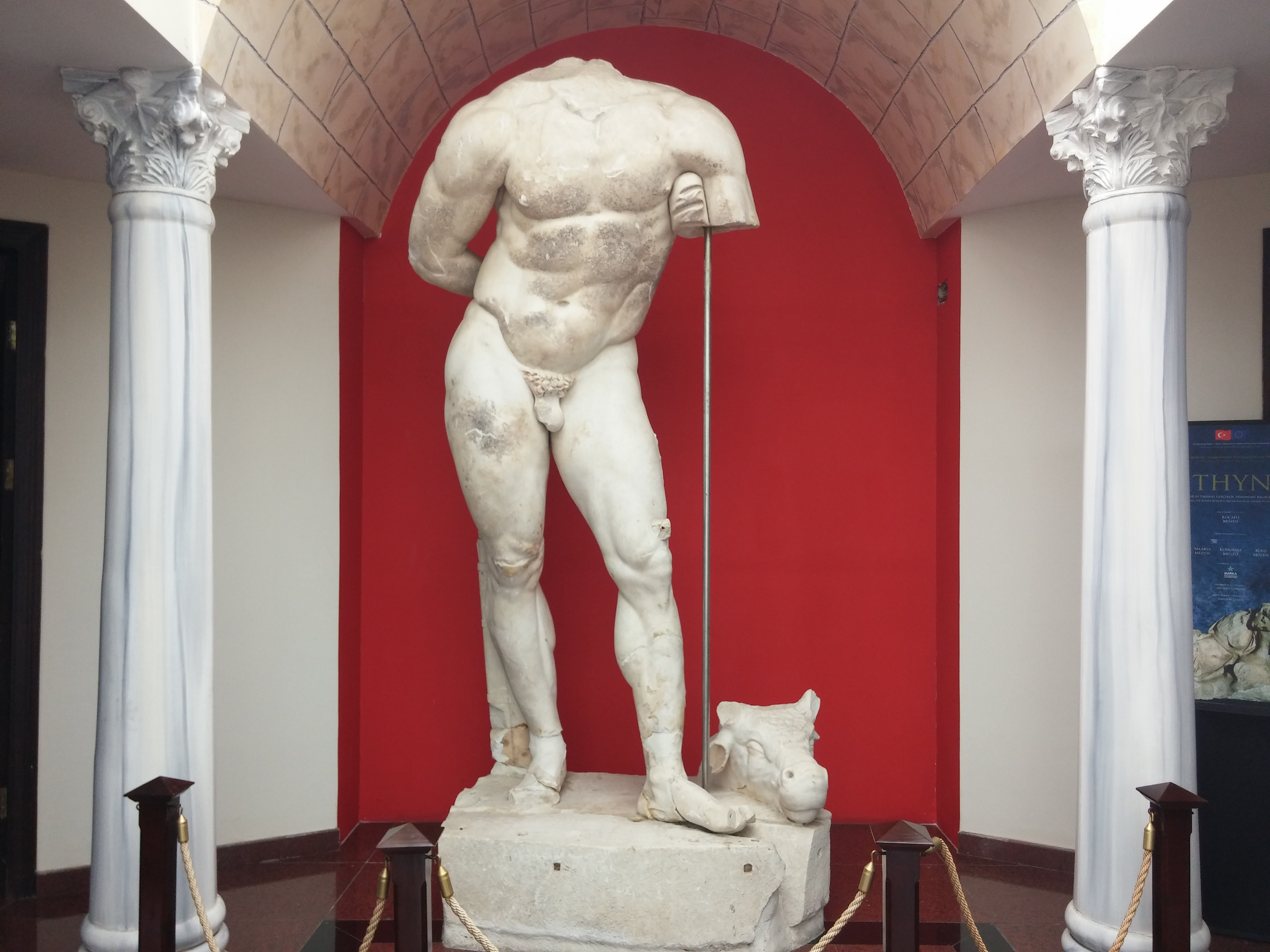
Statue of Heracles

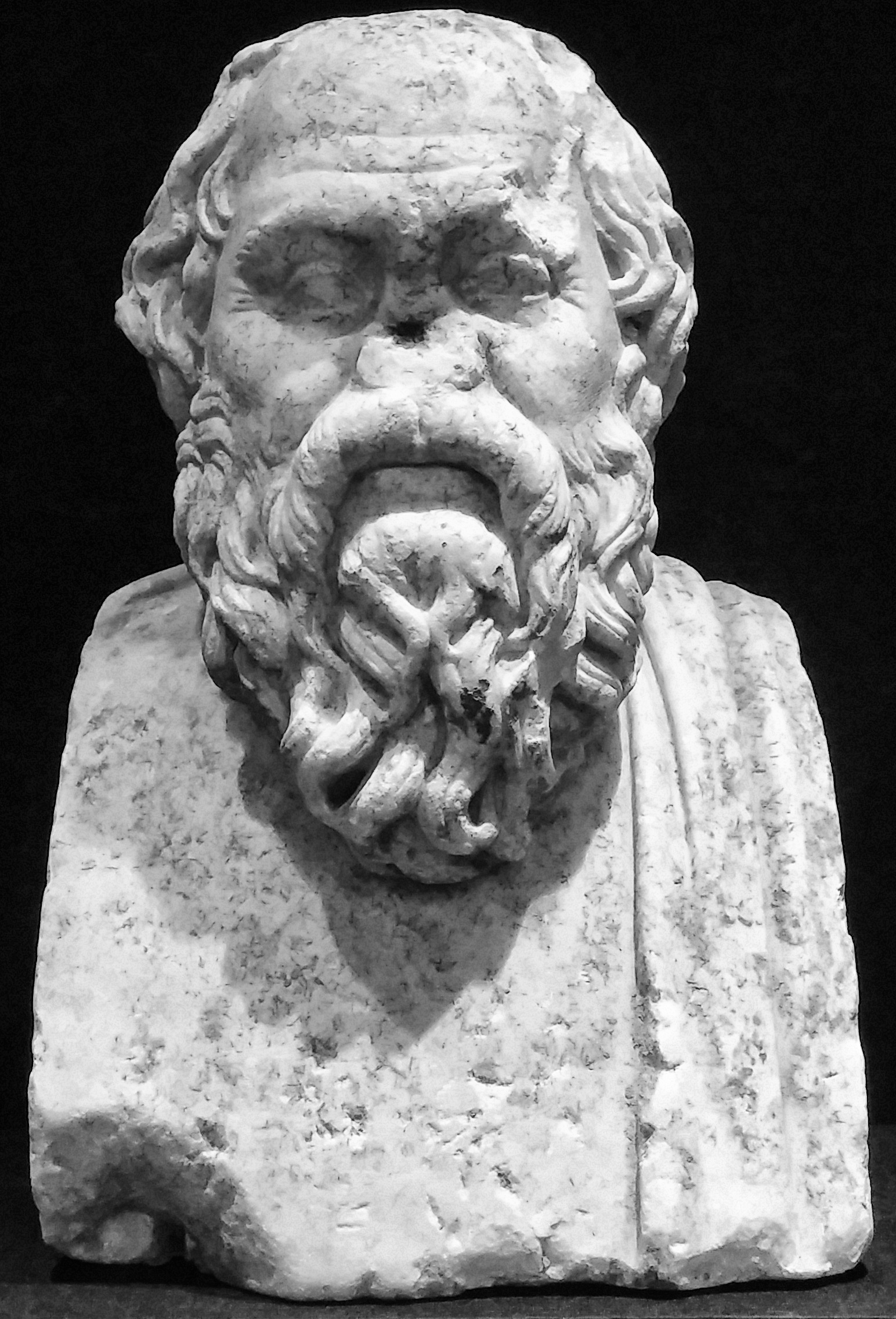
Bust of Socrates

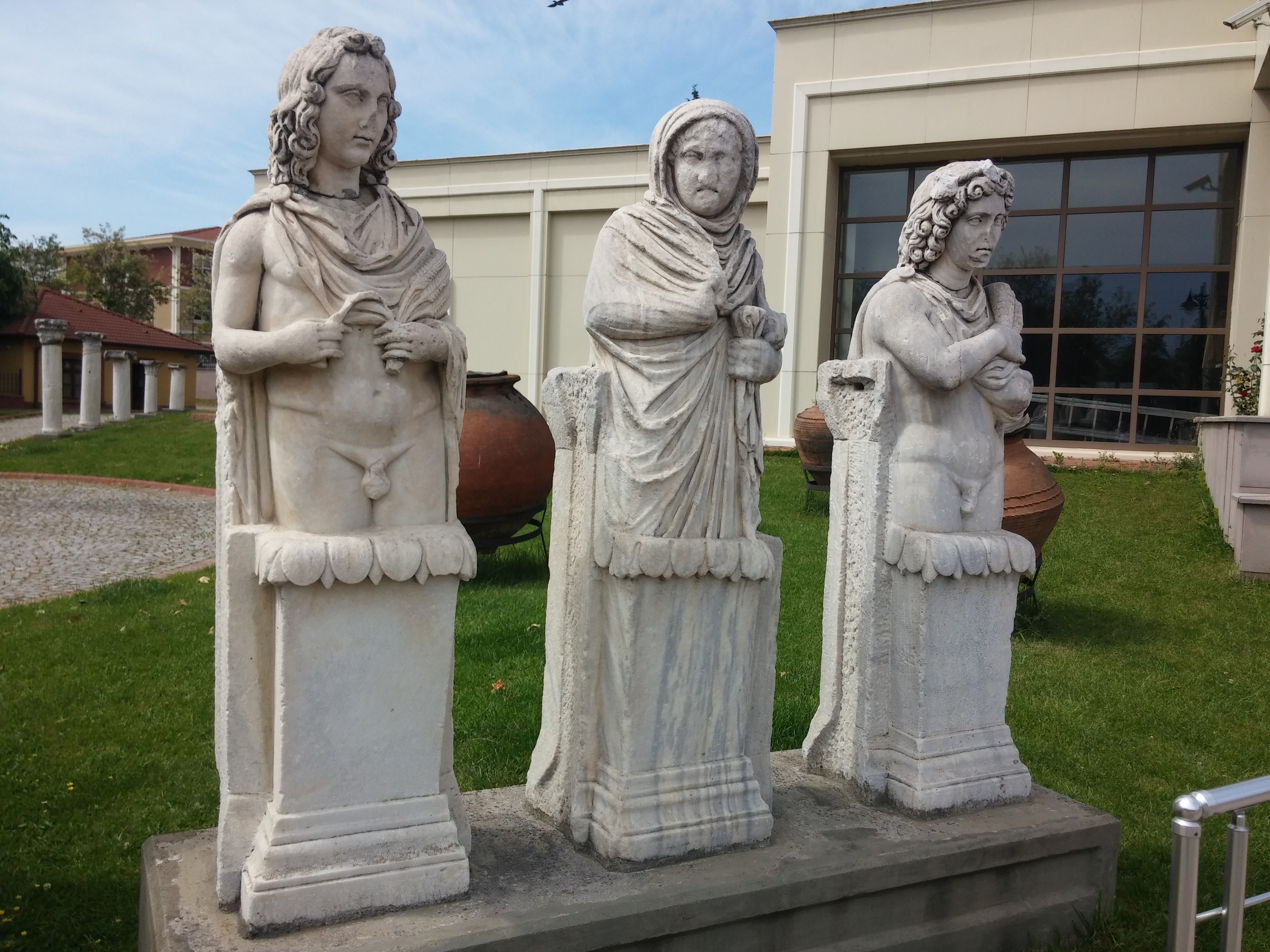
Statues depicting the seasons summer, winter and fall (from left to right)

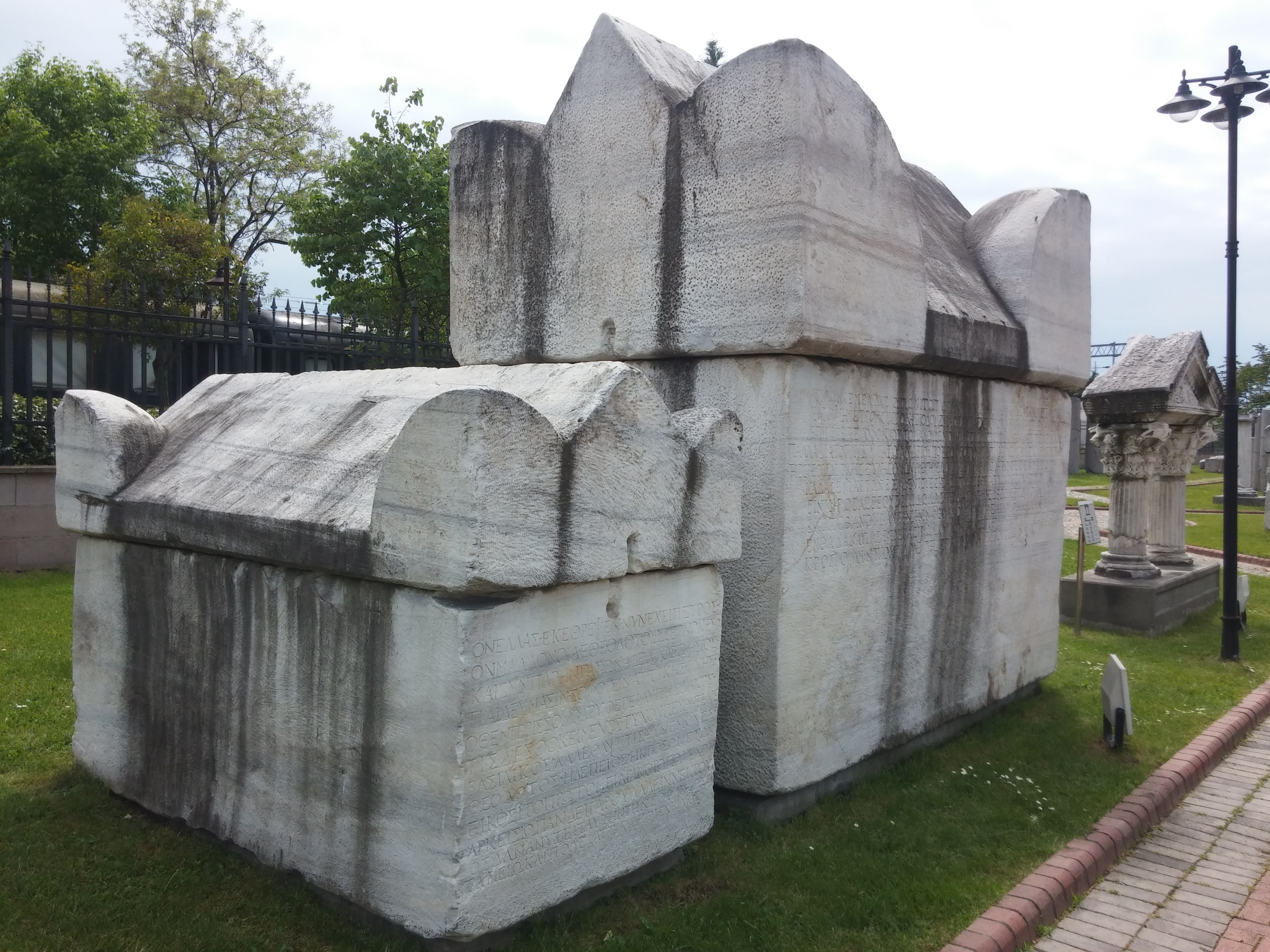
Sarcophagi in the museum yard

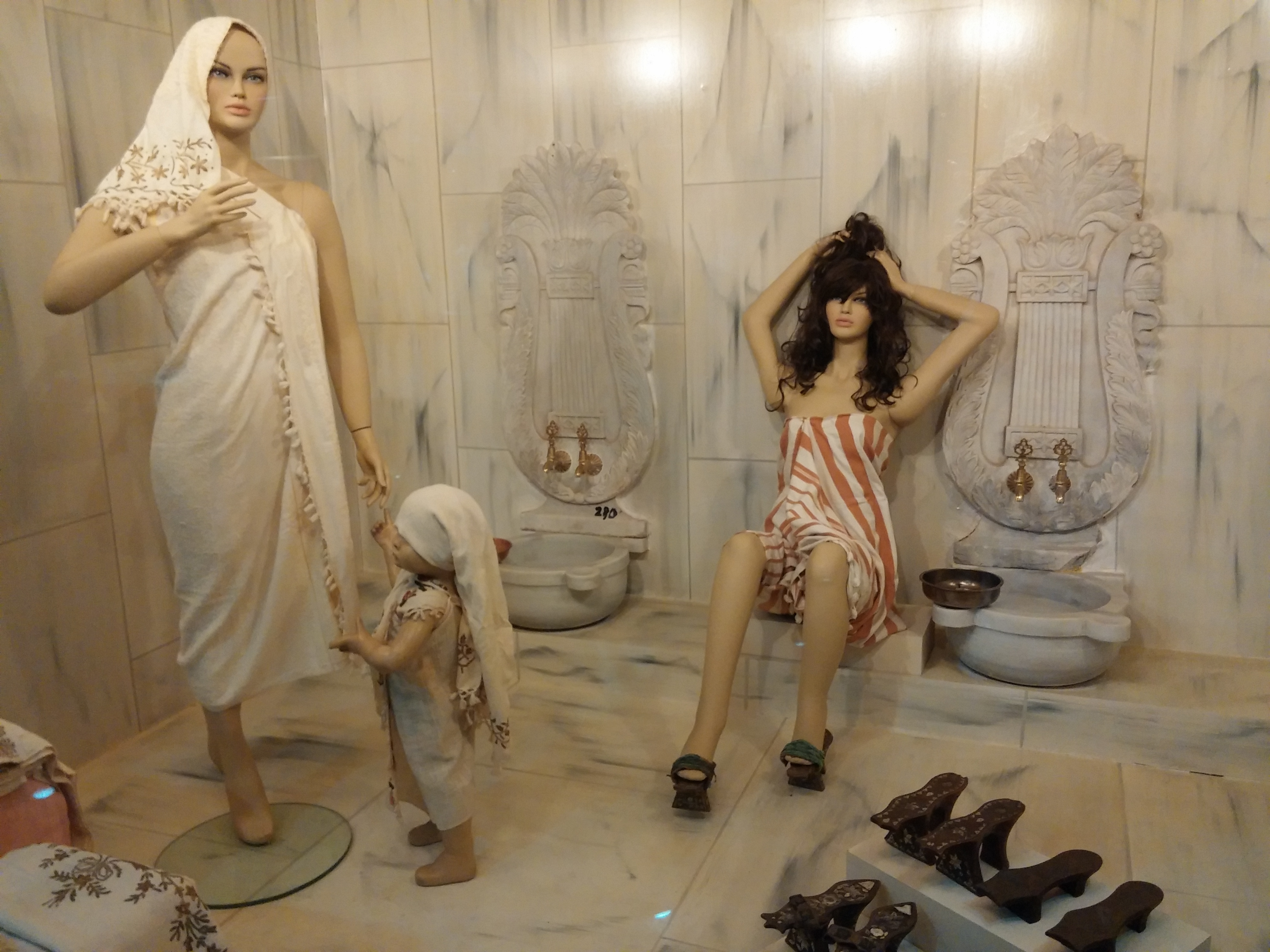
Inside a hamam (bathhouse)
