= SS Üsküdar =

Turkish marine vessel

History

Turkey
- Name: SS Üsküdar
- Operator: Şirket-i Hayriye; Denizcilik Bankası
- Builder: F. Schichau Shipyard, Elbing, Germany
- Launched: 1927
- In service: 1927–March 1, 1958
- Fate: Sank, March 1, 1958

General characteristics
- Type: Passenger ferry
- Tonnage: 148 gross register tons (GRT)
- Length: 33 m (108 ft)
- Beam: 6.60 m (21.7 ft)
- Draft: 2 m (6.6 ft)
- Propulsion: 3 × steam engines, 350 shp (260.99 kW)
- Speed: 8 knots (15 km/h; 9.2 mph)
- Capacity: 344 passengers
- Crew: 10

SS Üsküdar was a small passenger ferry built in Germany for the Turkish company Şirket-i Hayriye and launched in 1927. She sank in lodos weather on March 1, 1958, in the Gulf of Izmit. The accident killed 272 people on board including seven crew, 39 survived the incident.

== Ship ==
SS Üsküdar was built by F. Schichau Shipyard in Elbing, Germany in 1927 with funnel number 72. She was the first of two identical vessels the Turkish urban transportation company Şirket-i Hayriye commissioned in the Republican era.

She was 33 m (108 ft) long with a beam of 6.6 m (22 ft) and a draft of 2 m (6.6 ft). Three steam engines of 350 shp (260.99 kW) propelled her initially at 10 knots (19 km/h; 12 mph), which later dropped to 8 knots (15 km/h; 9.2 mph).

SS Üsküdar was capable of carrying 344 passengers. 430 lifejackets, 35 lifebuoys and two lifeboats were on board the ferry.

== Sinking ==
SS Üsküdar was on scheduled shuttle trips on the Sea of Marmara between İzmit and Değirmendere, a town on the southern coast of the Gulf of İzmit.

On March 1, 1958, "lodos", a heavy SW storm was raising high seas. Mehmet Aşçı, captain of SS Üsküdar, departed the ferry three minutes before the scheduled time of 12:30 local time from İzmit Pier, because the vessel was more vulnerable at the pier than at open sea. Shipmate Ali Kaya, who jumped onto the pier and untied the hawser, could not return to the ferry as the ship suddenly left the pier. The ferry had nine crew and 302 passengers aboard including 76 students from a local vocational high school.

As the ferry headed to Değirmendere, high waves raised by the storm blowing at 130 km/h (81 mph) rocked the small vessel. The bridge broke off and fell into water, taking the captain and the boatswain with it. The rudder chain broke leaving the ferry uncontrollable. Water filled the engine room and the front passenger department after breaking the window glass.

26 minutes from her departure, SS Üsküdar careened over on the port side and sank at 12:53 local time. 272 people died including 38 students and seven crew. 37 passengers and two crew survived the disaster.

== Wreck's salvage ==
Eight days after the incident, the Turkish Navy started a search and rescue operation. The muddy seabed hindered salvage efforts. On March 19, 1958, after eleven days of endeavors, the wreck was lifted with three slings off the 35 m (115 ft) deep seabed. Four corpses were recovered. It was observed that at some places, the steel sheets of the ship's hull were torn.
