= Kozluk, İzmit =

Kozluk
- Neighbourhood
- Location in Turkey Kozluk (Marmara)
- Coordinates: 40°45′53.03″N 29°54′49.43″E
- Country: Turkey
- Province: Kocaeli
- District: İzmit
- Time zone: UTC+3 (TRT)

Kozluk is a neighbourhood of the municipality and district of İzmit, Kocaeli Province, Turkey.
