= İzmit =

- City and municipality
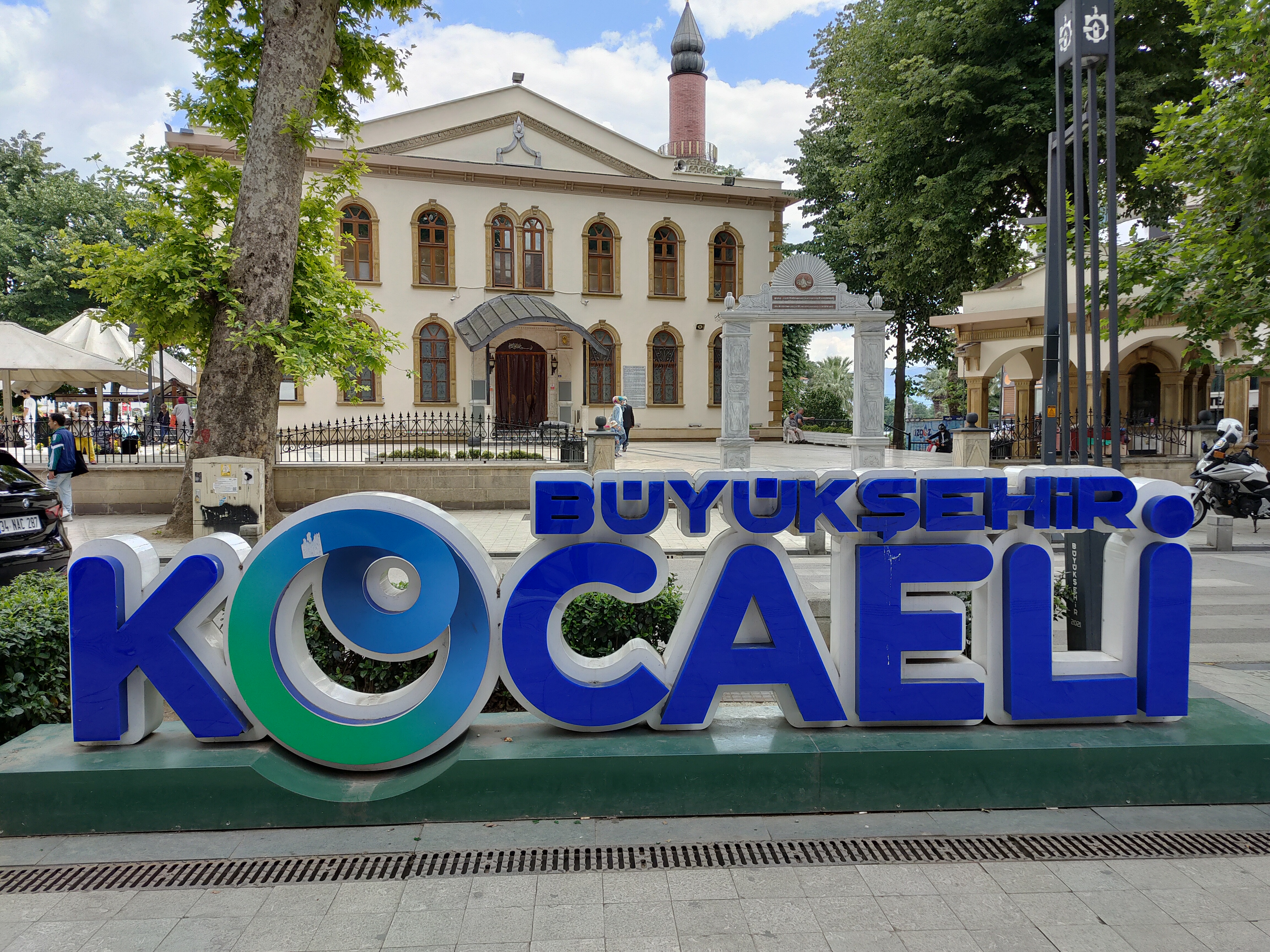
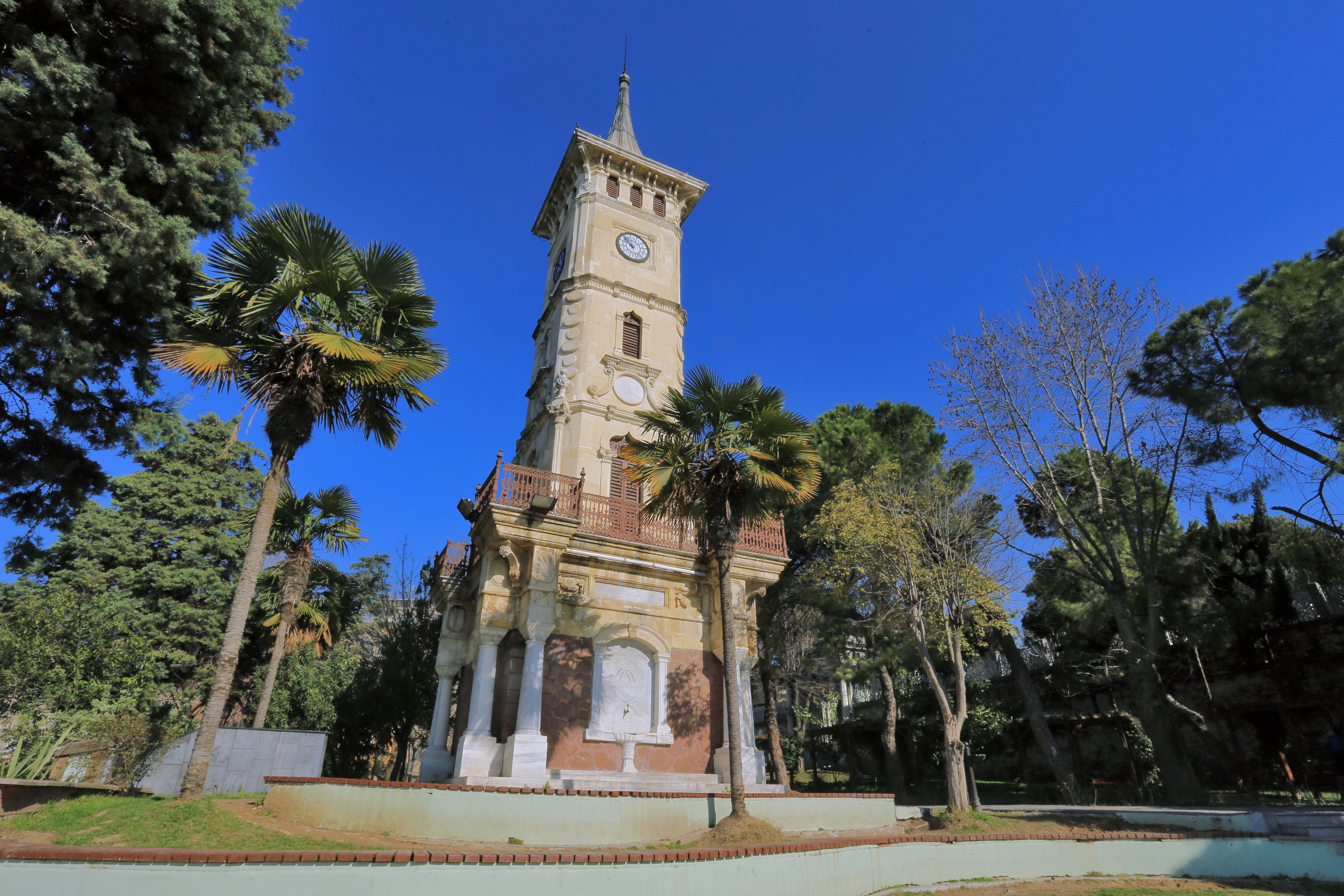
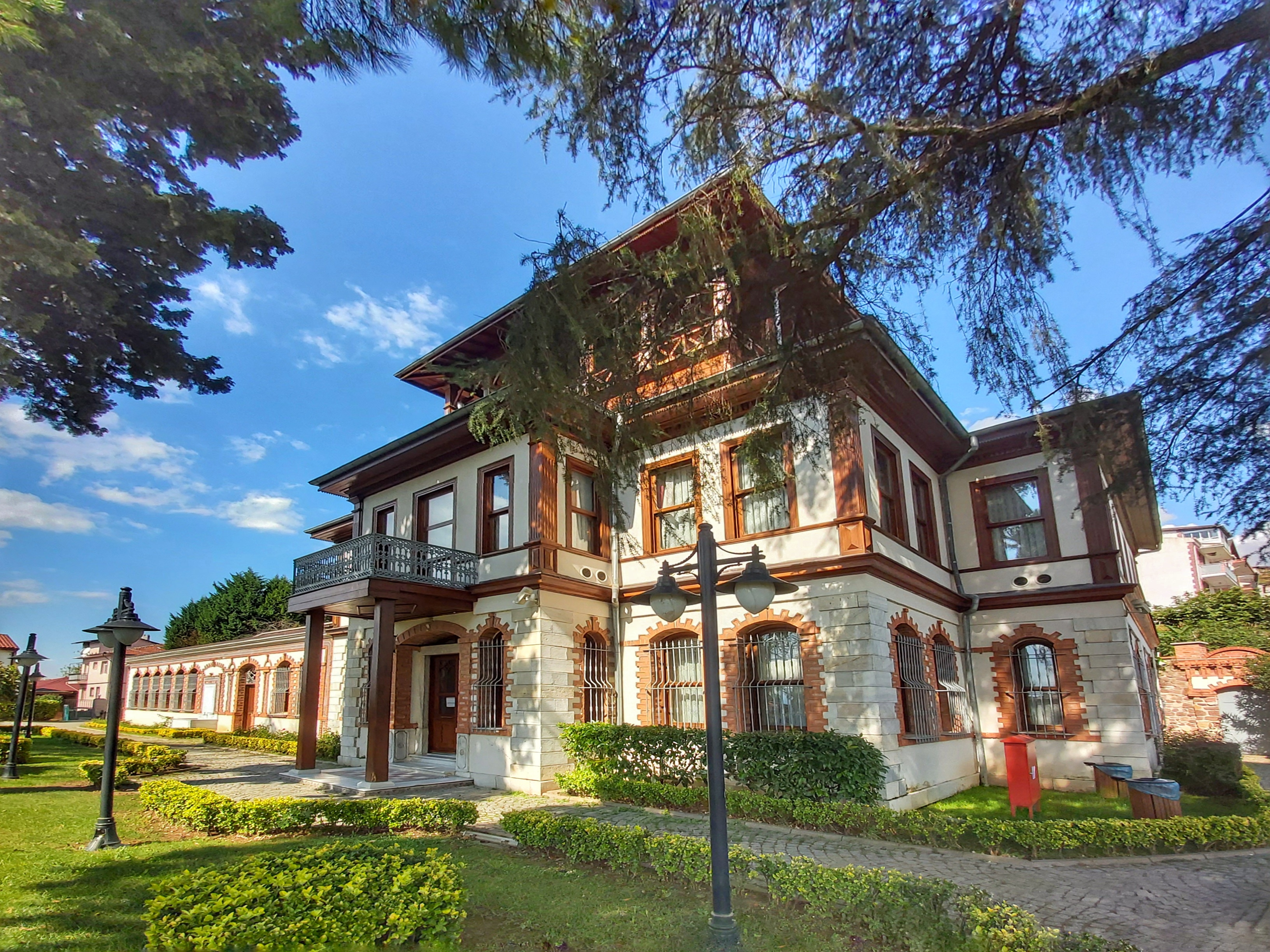
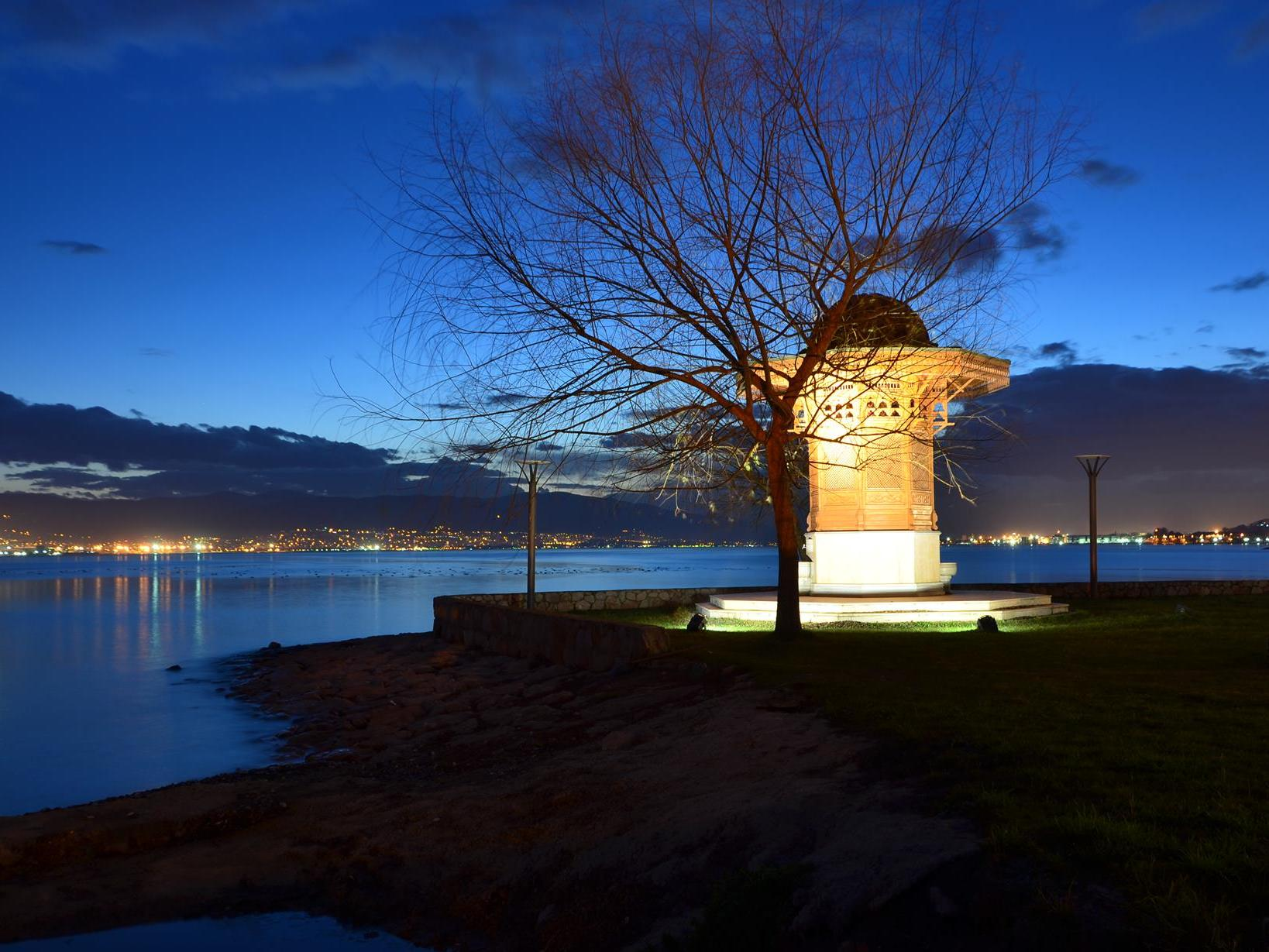
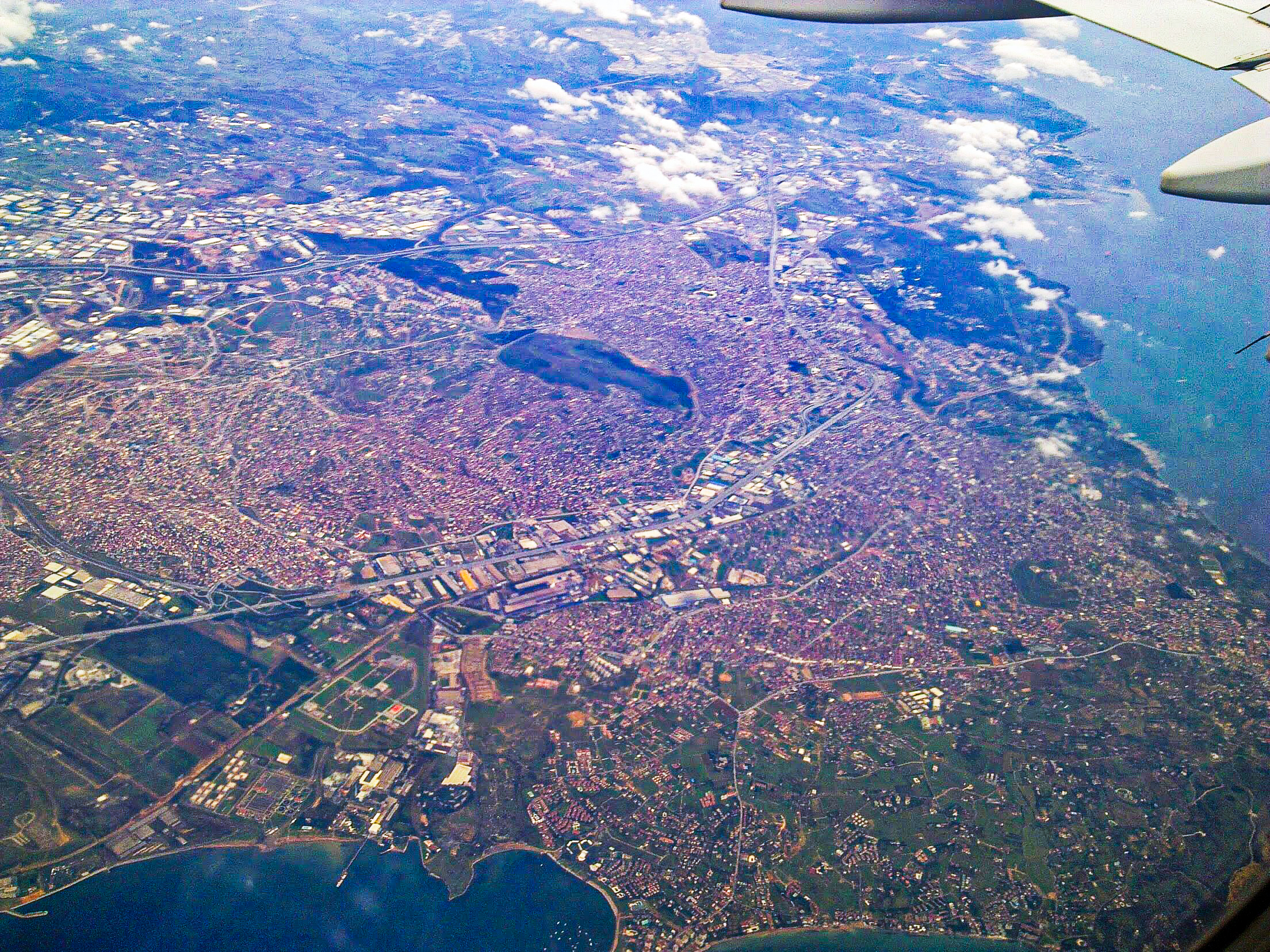
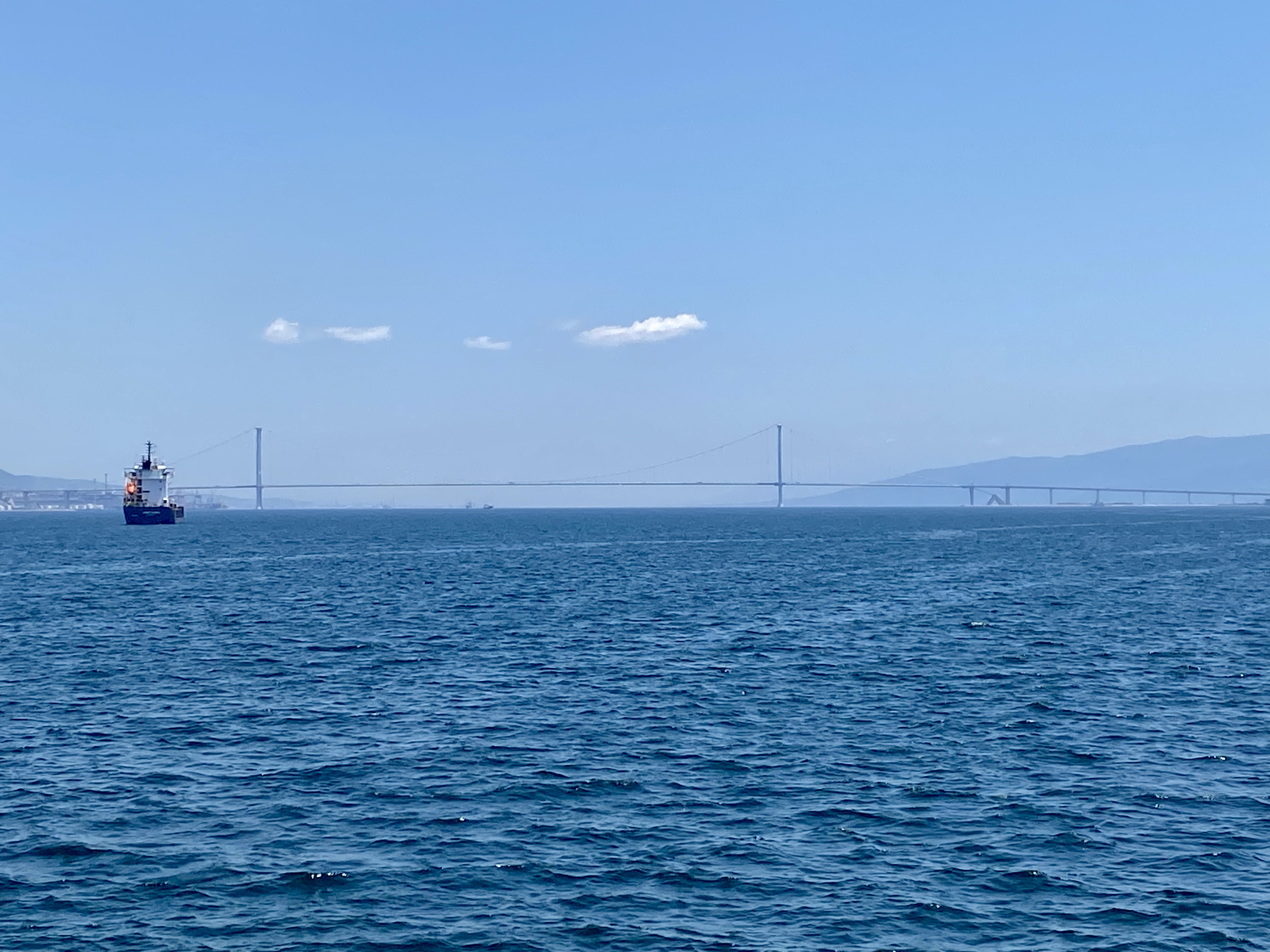
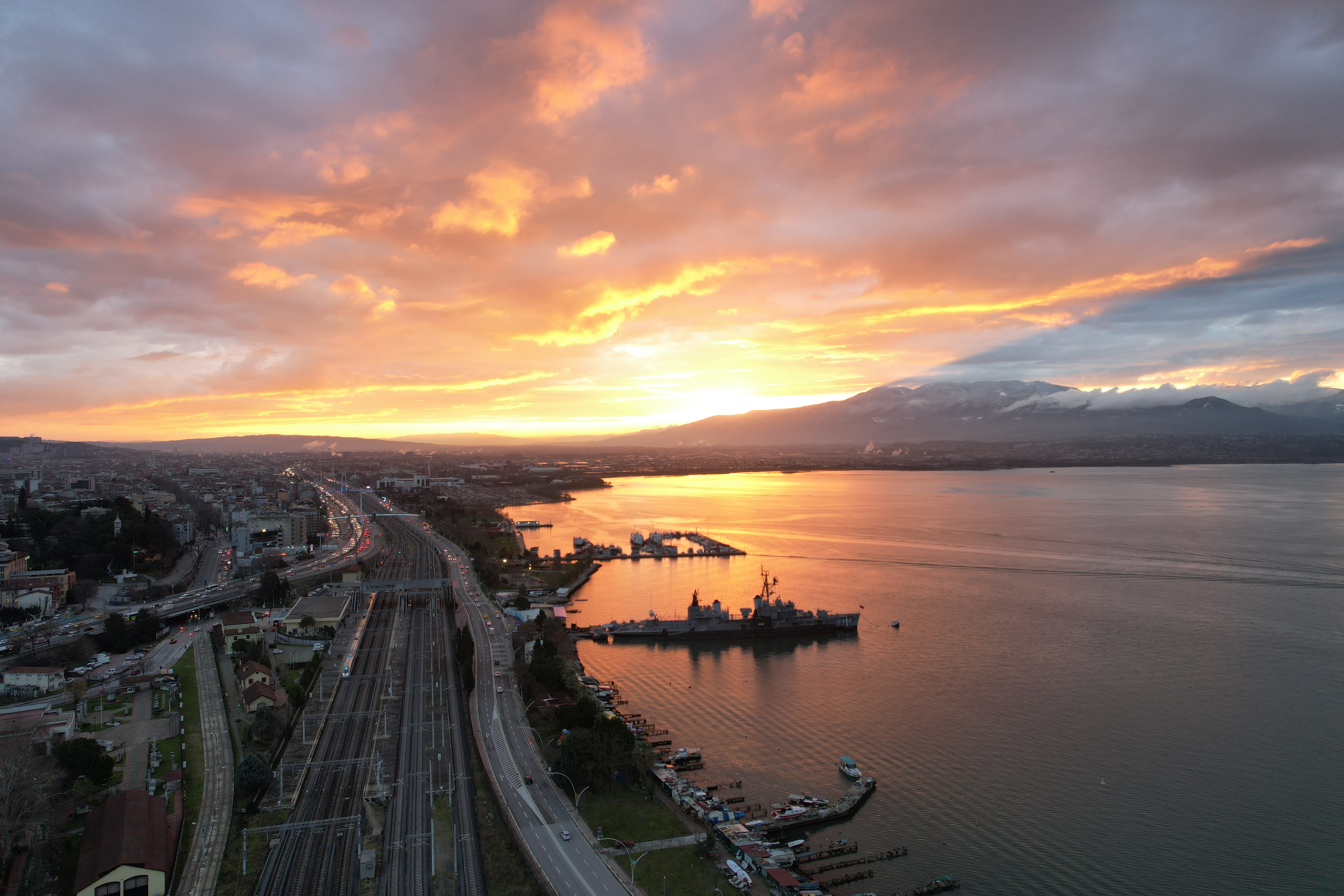
- Fevziye Mosque İzmit Clock Tower Mansion of Selim Sırrı Paşa SEKA Park Gebze Osman Gazi Bridge and Gulf of İzmit Gayret Museum Ship and İzmit city center

- Logo

- Location in Turkey
- Coordinates: 40.76°N 29.92°E
- Country: Turkey
- Region: Marmara
- Province: Kocaeli
- Earliest known settlement: c. 712 BC (Astacus in Başiskele district)

Government
  - Mayor: Fatma Kaplan Hürriyet (CHP)
  - Governing body: Municipal Council: CHP (22); AK Party (12); MHP (3)

Area
  - City and municipality: 480 km^{2} (190 sq mi)
- Elevation: 4 m (13 ft)

Population (2023)
  - City and municipality: 365,893
  - Metro: 2,102,907
  - Rank: 10th

GDP
  - Province: $34 billion (2023)
  - Per capita: $21,985 (2023)
- Time zone: UTC+3 (TRT)
- Postal code: 41xxx
- Area code: (+90) 262
- Website: www.izmit.bel.tr www.izmit.gov.tr

İzmit (Turkish pronunciation: [ˈizmit]) is a municipality and the capital district of Kocaeli Province, Turkey. Its area is 480 km^{2}, and its population is 376,056 (2022). The capital of Kocaeli Province, it is located at the Gulf of İzmit in the Sea of Marmara, about 100 km (62 mi) east of Istanbul, on the northwestern part of Anatolia. Kocaeli Province (including rural areas) had a population of 2,079,072 inhabitants in 2022, of whom approximately 1.2 million lived in the largely urban İzmit City metro area made up of Kartepe, Başiskele, Körfez, Gölcük, Derince and Sapanca (in Sakarya Province). Similar to Istanbul, the area of İzmit is coterminous with its province. It is also the most populated of any city or town in Turkey whose name isn't shared with the province it is located in.

İzmit was known as Nicomedia and Ólbia in antiquity, and was the eastern and most senior capital city of the Roman Empire between 286 and 324, during the Tetrarchy introduced by Diocletian. Following Constantine the Great's victory over co-emperor Licinius at the Battle of Chrysopolis (modern Üsküdar) in 324, Nicomedia served as an interim capital city for Constantine until 330, when Constantinople (modern Istanbul) was officially proclaimed as the new capital of the Roman Empire. During the Ottoman Empire, İzmit was the capital of the Sanjak of Kocaeli. At present, the Istanbul-İzmit area is one of the main industrial regions in Turkey.

== Name ==
İzmit was known as Nicomedia (Ancient Greek: Νικομήδεια) and Ólbia (Ancient Greek: Ὀλβία) in antiquity. İzmit derives from Nicomedia, prefixed with εἰς 'to' or 'into' (similar to Istanbul). Names used in English prior to official Turkish Latinization include Ismid, Iskimid, and Isnikmid.

== Geography ==
The geographical location of İzmit is between 40°-41° N and 29°-31° E, surrounded by the Gulf of İzmit at south, Istanbul and the Sea of Marmara at west, the Black Sea at north, and Sakarya at east.

The city is mostly built on hill slopes because of the cramped area, while flat plains surround the gulf, near the sea. This topographic structure divided the city into two parts. The first was created on flat plains, where the city center is located. The railway and highway networks pass from this area which is close to the Sea of Marmara. The second part was built on hills, with many historic houses from the Ottoman period in the old quarters.

== History ==
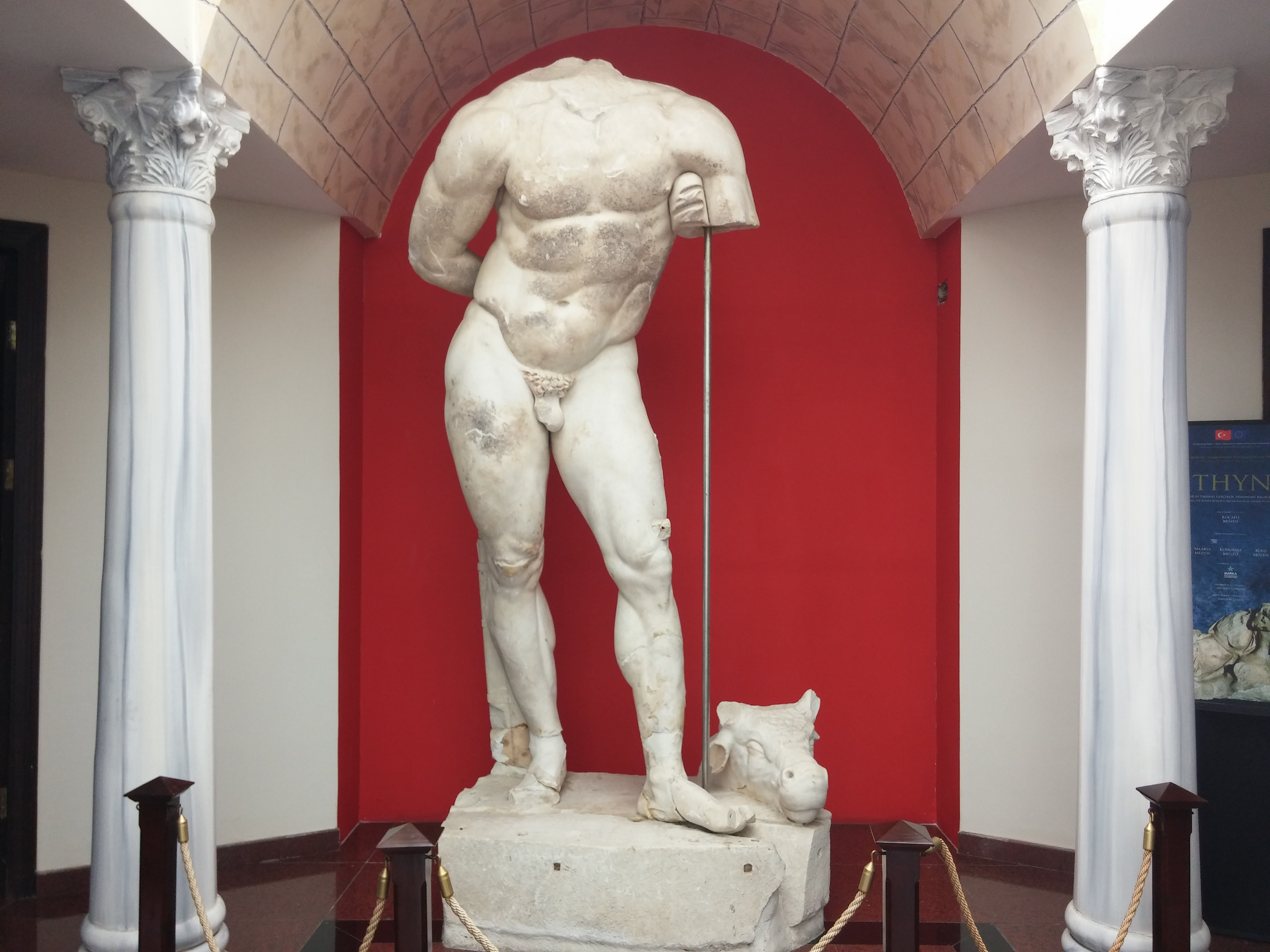
Statue of Heracles at the Kocaeli Museum in İzmit

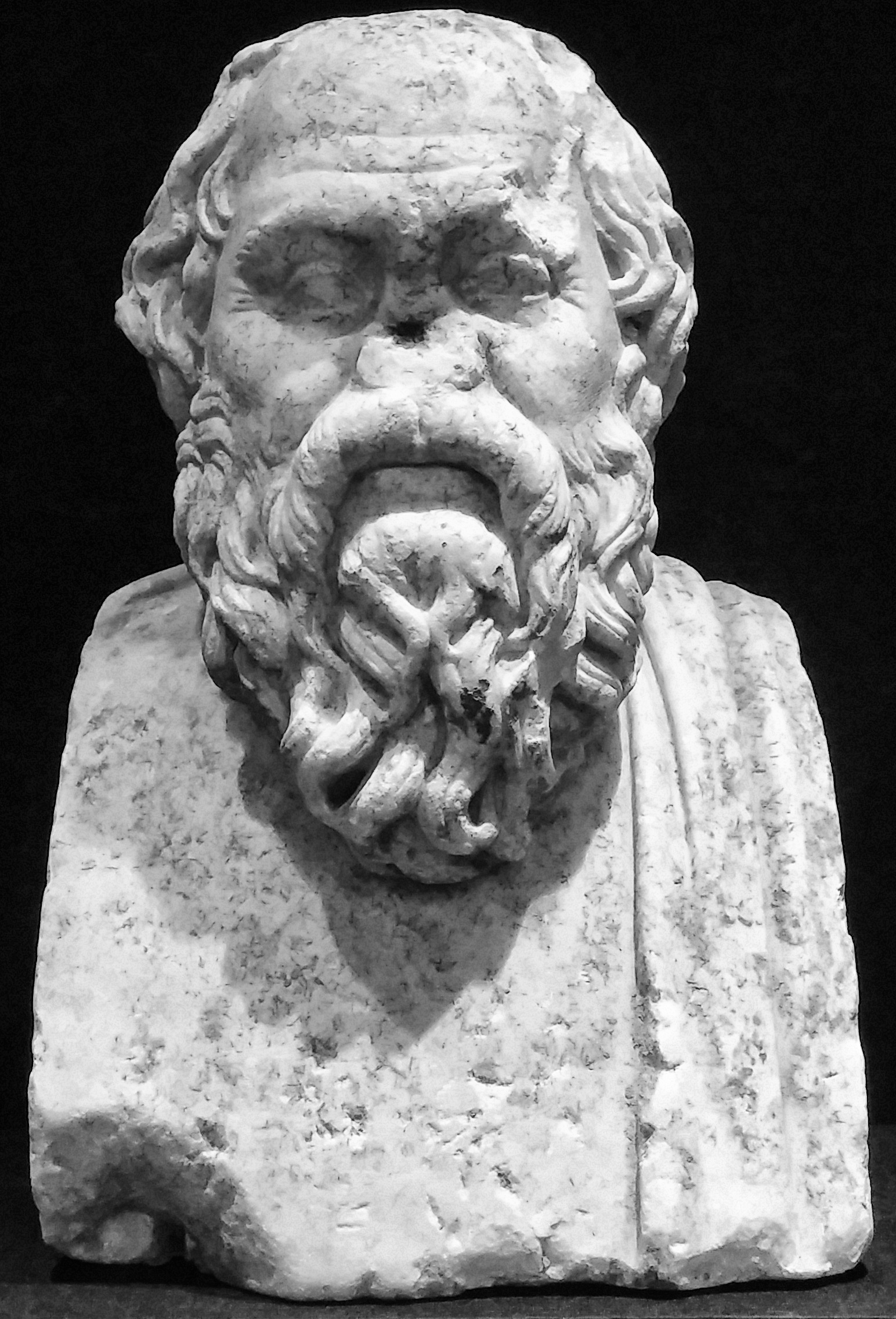
Bust of Socrates at the Kocaeli Museum in İzmit

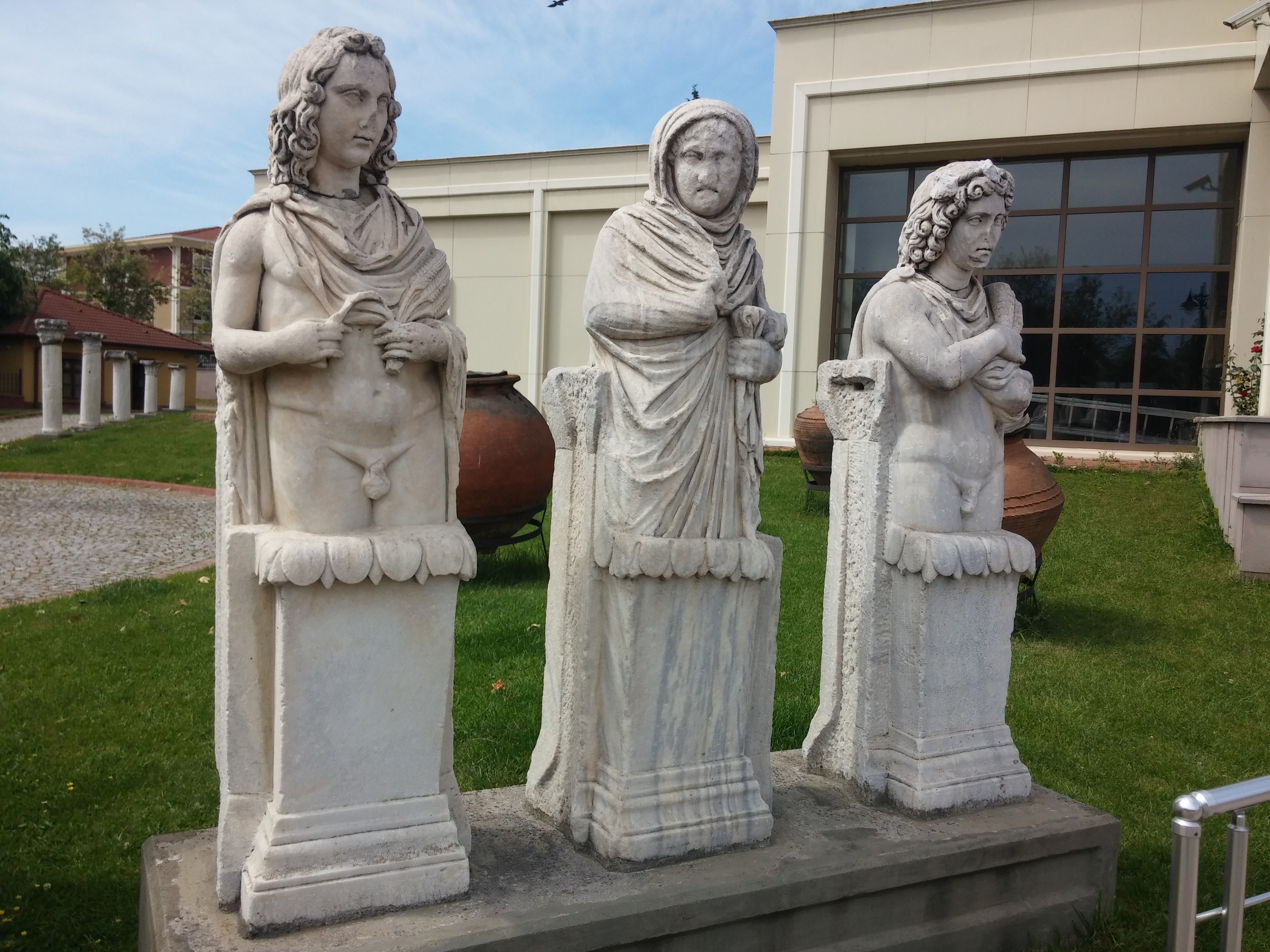
Statues depicting the seasons summer, winter and autumn (from left to right) at the Kocaeli Museum

In Antiquity, the city in Greek was called Astacus or Olbia (founded 712 BC). After being destroyed, it was rebuilt and founded by Nicomedes I of Bithynia in 264 BC under the name of Nicomedia. It remained one of the most important cities in northwestern Asia Minor.

Carthaginian general and statesman Hannibal came to Nicomedia in his final years and committed suicide in nearby Libyssa (modern Gebze), in a date between 183 and 181 BC.

The historian Arrian was born in Nicomedia, which was the metropolis of Bithynia under the Roman Empire (see also Nicaea).

In 286 AD, Roman emperor Diocletian made Nicomedia the eastern capital city of the Roman Empire, when he introduced the Tetrarchy system. Nicomedia remained as the eastern (and most senior) capital of the Roman Empire until Licinius was defeated by Constantine the Great in 324. Constantine mainly resided in Nicomedia as his interim capital city for the next six years; until in 330 he declared the nearby Byzantium as Nova Roma, which eventually became known as Constantinople (modern Istanbul). Constantine died at an imperial villa in the vicinity of Nicomedia on 22 May 337. Owing to its position at the convergence of the Asiatic roads leading to the new capital, Nicomedia retained its importance even after the foundation of Constantinople.

In 451, the local bishopric was promoted to a Metropolitan see under the jurisdiction of the Ecumenical Patriarchate of Constantinople.

Nicomedia remained under Byzantine rule until the late 11th century, when it was captured by Seljuk Turks. However, the city soon returned to Byzantine sovereignty as a consequence of the successes of the First Crusade. After the sack of Constantinople in 1204, during the Fourth Crusade, the city of Nicomedia, with most of the Bithynia province, became a part of the Latin Empire. It was recaptured by the Byzantines around 1235 and stayed within Byzantine borders until the first half of the 14th century. The city was conquered by the Ottoman Turks in 1337.

In the early 20th century, it remained the seat of a pasha, a Greek metropolitan, and an Armenian archbishop.

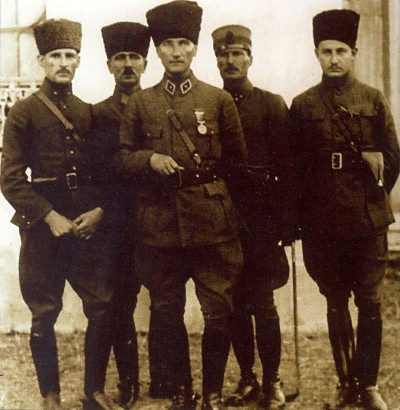
Mustafa Kemal Atatürk (middle) in İzmit, June 1922

İzmit was occupied by the United Kingdom on 6 July 1920, during the Turkish War of Independence. The British left it to Greece on 27 October 1920. İzmit was re-taken by the Turks on 28 June 1921. As of 1920, the British reported that the city had a population of about 13,000. In 1920–1921 atrocities were committed in the city and its surroundings during the Greco-Turkish War (1919–1922) against the Greek civilian population. An Allied report (on 1 June 1921) stated that a large number of excesses were committed by both sides during the last year, while the Turkish atrocities in the Izmit peninsula "have been more considerable and ferocious than those on the part of the Greeks".

The 7.6 M_{w} earthquake of 17 August 1999 devastated the region with a maximum Mercalli intensity of IX (Violent). The shock killed more than 17,000 people and left half a million homeless. It took several years for the city to recover from this disaster, and traces of the earthquake remain visible.

== Main sights ==
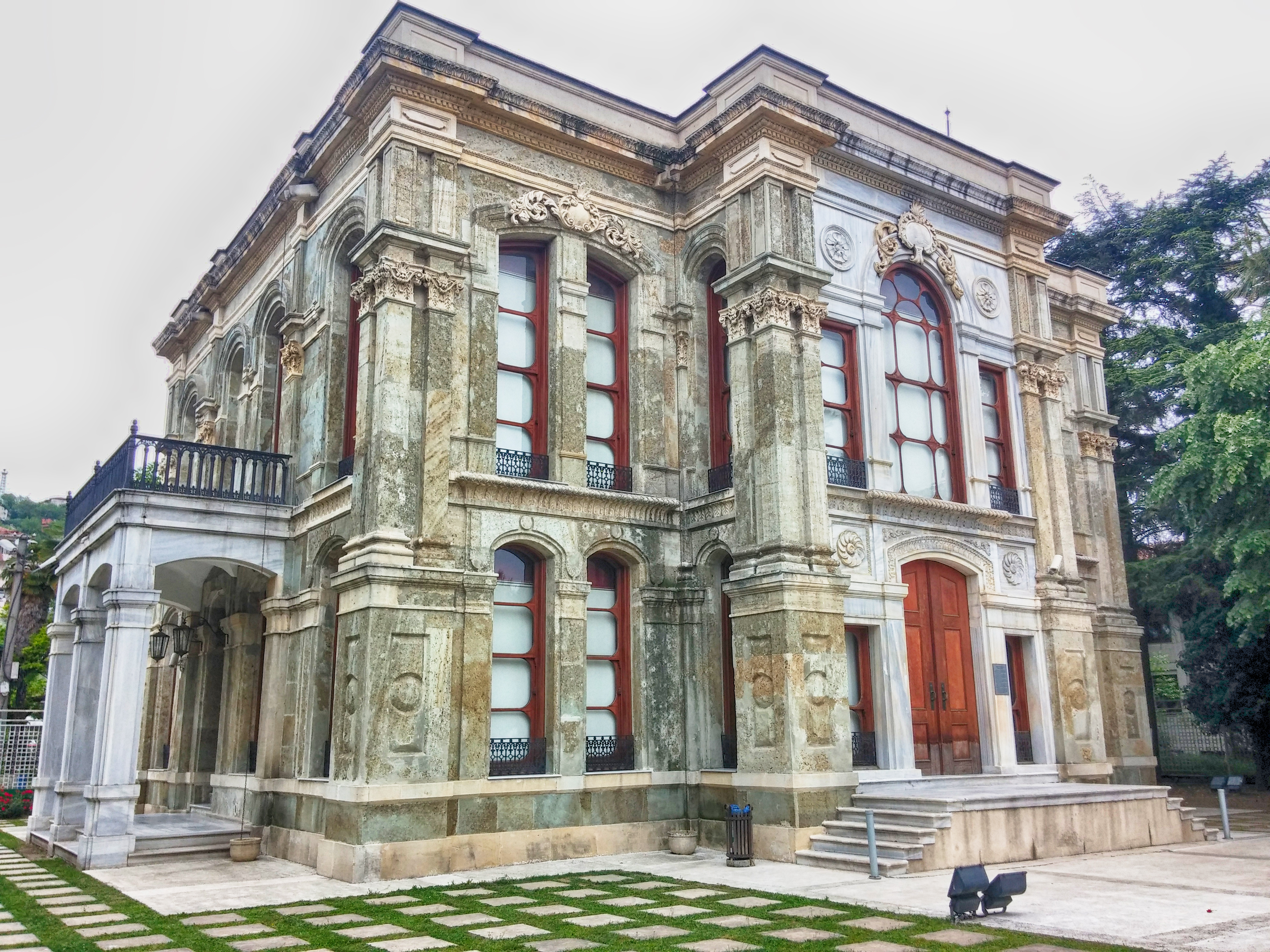
The Kasr-ı Hümayun in İzmit is a hunting pavilion built by the Ottoman Sultan Abdülaziz (r. 1861–1876)

There are numerous tourist attractions in the city center and its adjacent region, such as:

- remains of the ancient Acropolis, Agora, Amphitheater, Nymphaeum, Necropolis
- the Demeter Temple
- the Hellenistic Üçtepeler Mound King Tombs
- Roman city walls, aqueducts and cisterns
- parts of the Temple of Augustus
- parts of the Palace and Arsenal of Diocletian
- the Byzantine fortress at the core of the Roman city walls
- Orhan Gazi Mosque (1333)
- the 14th century Süleyman Paşa Hamam
- the 16th century Imaret Mosque and Pertev Paşa Mosque (1580), designed by the Ottoman chief architect Mimar Sinan
- Pertev Paşa Fountain (1571)
- the 16th century Mehmed Bey Hamam
- Saatçi Ali Efendi Mansion (1776)
- Tüysüz Fountain (1782)
- the early 19th century Fevziye Mosque
- Kapanca Sokağı Fountain and Canfeda Kethüda Kadın Fountain (1827)
- Sırrı Paşa Mansion (mid-19th century)
- Kasr-ı Hümayun Palace
- French Theological School
- Redif Barracks (1863)
- İzmit Clock Tower (1901)
- Kocaeli Museum
- SEKA Paper Museum
- Fethiye Street

== Economy ==
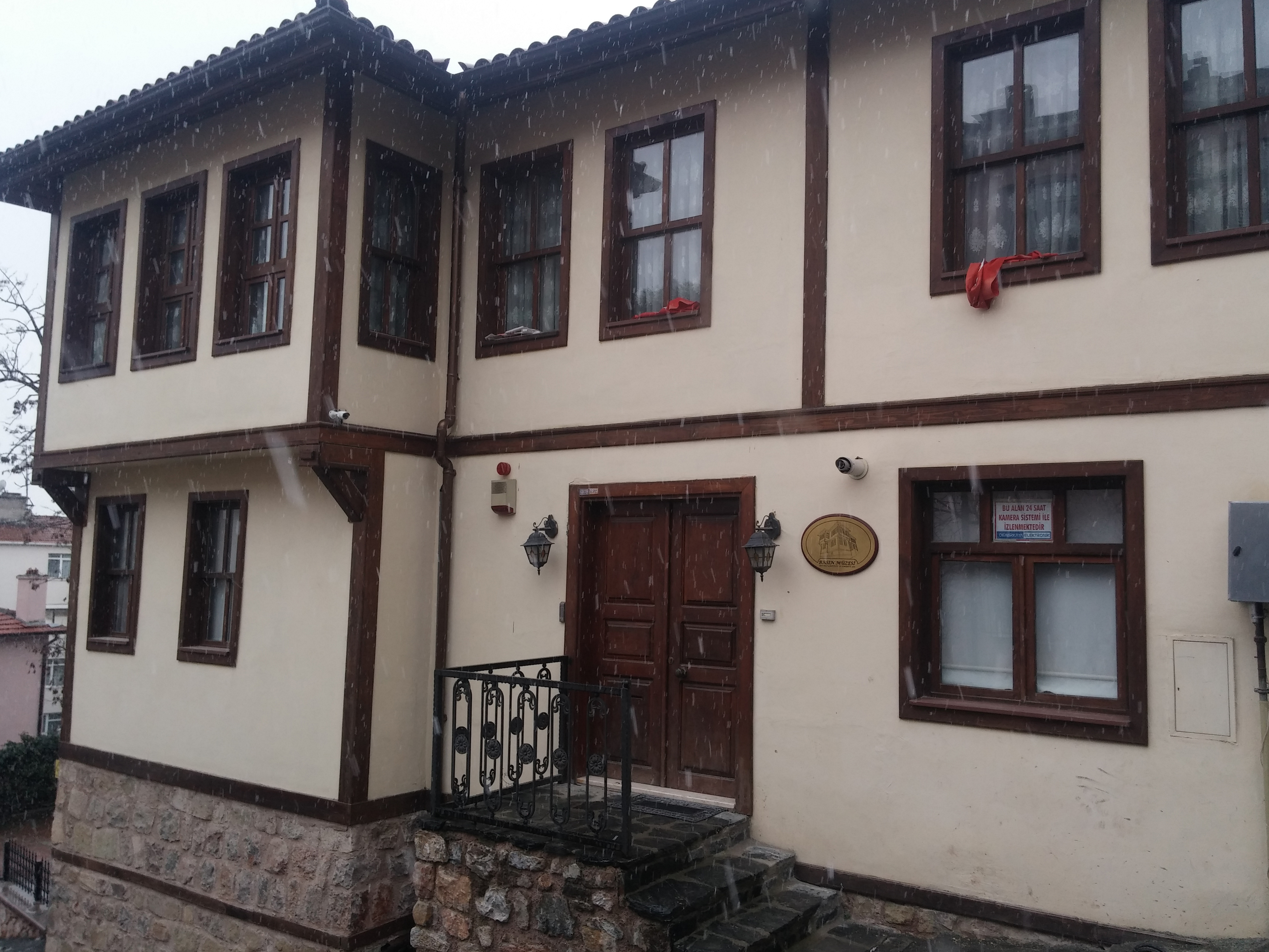
Kocaeli Press Museum

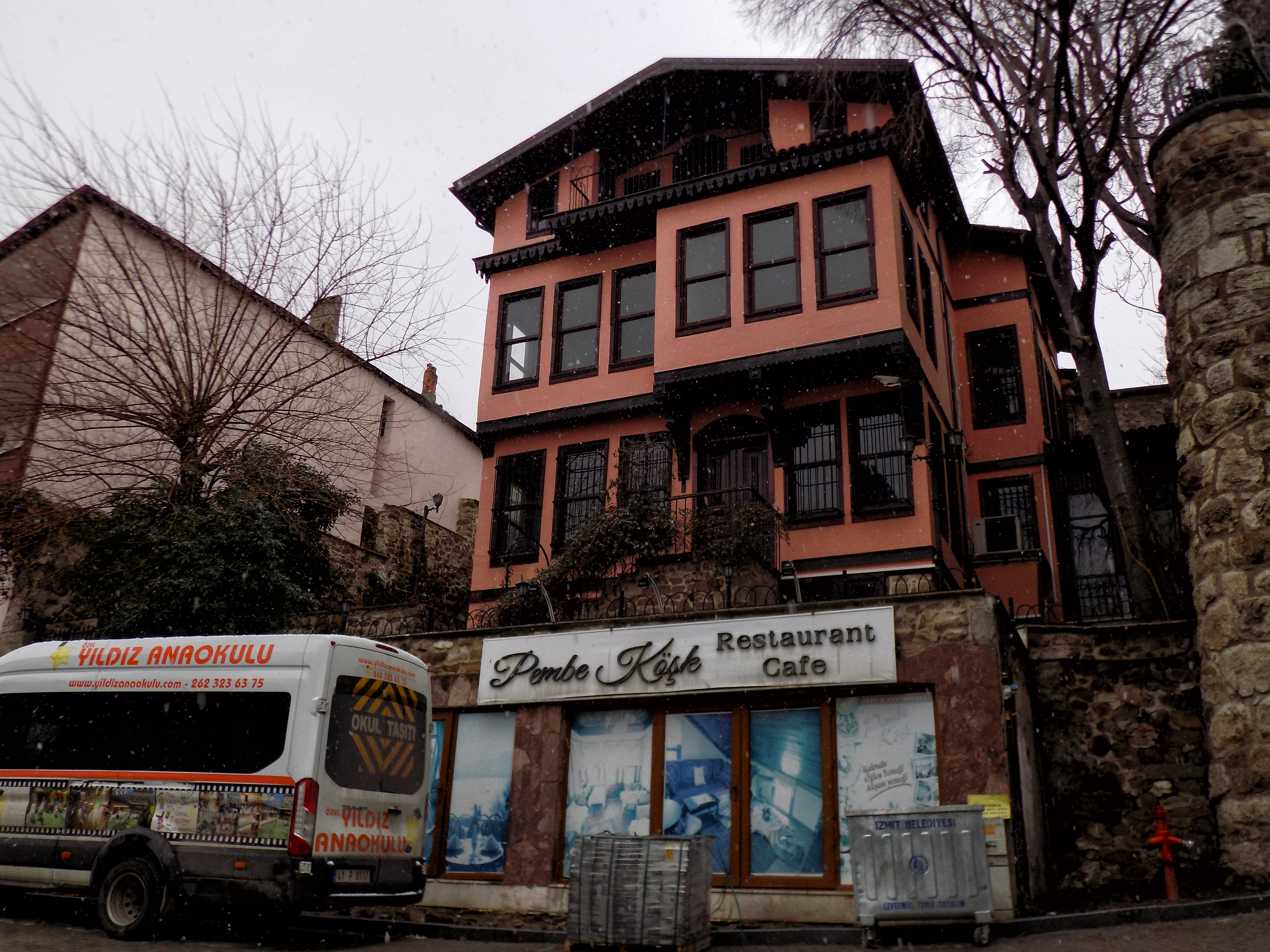
An old mansion in İzmit

İzmit has a history as a port city. As of 1913, the Turkish government had been working to privatize the port. At that time, Vickers built a temporary dock, bringing a small export business to the area. The British described the port as having little business as of 1920.

During the sanjak period of İzmit, the forested regions of the area were devastated by deforestation. The wood in the region of İzmit was used to produce charcoal, primarily. During the 1920s, the area was also known for manufacturing linen. Factories were rare during that time, so most linen was handmade. It was described as being "coarse" and as being in high demand in Turkey as of 1920. İzmit was the home of two Turkish Army and Navy uniform factories. One made fez hats and the other made cloth. The area made carpet and embroidery, made by mainly Christian women.

İzmit has a large oil refinery and major paper and cement factories. Ford Motor Company has a plant here in a joint venture with Otosan, assembling the Transit/Tourneo (including the new V362 Transit/Tourneo Custom since late 2012) and Transit/Tourneo Connect vans. After Ford's Southampton Assembly Plant's closure scheduled for July 2013 was completed, and the launch of the new Otosan only V363 Transit in 2014, İzmit became the sole producer of Ford Transit vans for Europe. It is also a transportation hub, being on the main highway and railway lines between Istanbul and Ankara and having a major port.

In the past few years the province has developed into a growth point for the Turkish automotive industry, receiving investments from Ford, Hyundai, Honda and Isuzu. Tyre and rubber products are produced to world-class standard (Goodyear, Pirelli, Lassa and Bridgestone). As of today, Kocaeli province has attracted more than 1200 industrial investments, 108 of which have been established with international capital. Turkey's largest enterprise, the Tüpraş Petroleum Refinery Plant, is in Kocaeli, containing altogether 27% of the national chemical products industry, including petrochemical products. Eighteen of the 100 largest enterprises of Turkey are in Kocaeli and contribute to around 17%-18% of the national tax revenues.

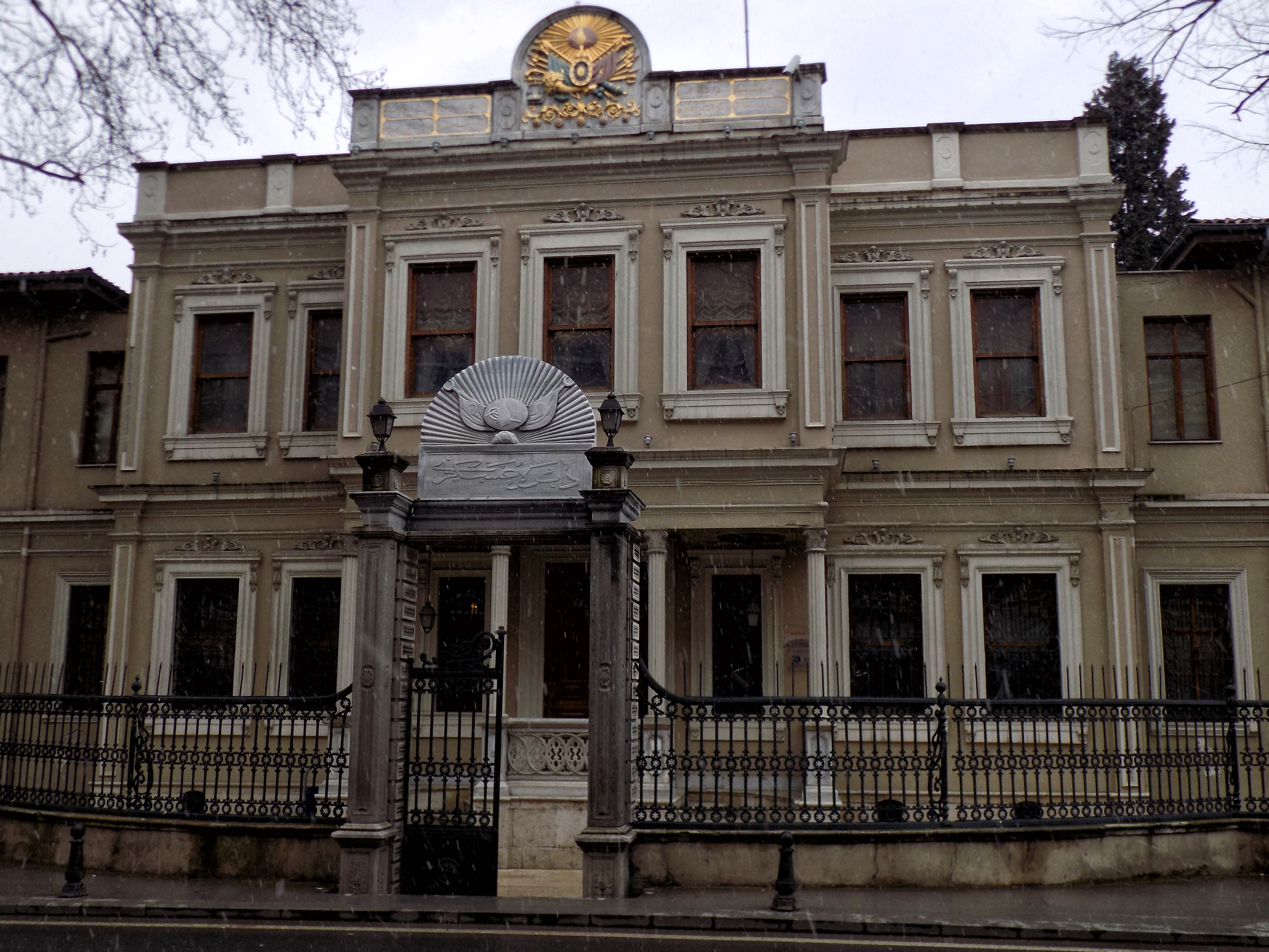
Atatürk and Redif Museum

Financial Times affiliated Foreign Direct Investment magazine nominated Kocaeli (the province of which İzmit is the capital) among the 25 European Regions of the Future for 2006–2007. The city was chosen along with Adana for Turkey, which scored the highest points for cost effectiveness against Kocaeli's wider infrastructure, while Adana and Kocaeli tied on points for human resources and quality of life.

The famous Turkish traditional sweet Pişmaniye is a product of İzmit and the Kocaeli Province.

== Composition ==
There are 102 neighbourhoods in İzmit District:

- 28 Haziran
- Akarca
- Akçakoca
- Akmeşe Atatürk
- Akmeşe Cumhuriyet
- Akpınar
- Alikahya Atatürk
- Alikahya Cumhuriyet
- Alikahya Fatih
- Ambarcı
- Arızlı
- Arpalıkihsaniye
- Ayazma
- Bağlıca
- Balören
- Bayraktar
- Bekirdere
- Biberoglu
- Böğürgen
- Bulduk
- Çağırğan
- Çavuşoğlu
- Çayırköy
- Cedid
- Çubuklubala
- Çubukluosmaniye
- Çukurbağ
- Dağköy
- Doğan
- Düğmeciler
- Durhasan
- Emirhan
- Erenler
- Eseler
- Fethiye
- Fevziçakmak
- Gedikli
- Gökçeören
- Gülbahçe Kadriye
- Gültepe
- Gündoğdu
- Güvercinlik
- Hacı Hasan
- Hacıhızır
- Hakaniye
- Hasancıklar
- Hatip
- İzmit Cumhuriyet
- İzmit Fatih
- Kabaoğlu
- Kadıköy
- Karaabdülbaki
- Karabaş
- Karadenizliler
- Kaynarca
- Kemalpaşa
- Kısalar
- Kocatepe
- Körfez
- Kozluca
- Kozluk
- Kulfallı
- Kulmahmut
- Kurtdere
- Kuruçeşme Fatih
- Malta
- Mecidiye
- Mehmet Ali Paşa
- Merkez
- Nebihoca
- Ömerağa
- Orhan
- Orhaniye
- Ortaburun
- Şahinler
- Sanayi
- Sapakpınar
- Sarışeyh
- Sekbanlı
- Sepetçi
- Serdar
- Şirintepe
- Süleymaniye
- Sultaniye
- Süverler
- Tavşantepe
- Tepecik
- Tepeköy
- Terzibayırı
- Topçular
- Turgut
- Tüysüzler
- Veliahmet
- Yahyakaptan
- Yassıbağ
- Yenice
- Yenidoğan
- Yenimahalle
- Yenişehir
- Yeşilova
- Zabıtan
- Zeytinburnu

== Transport ==
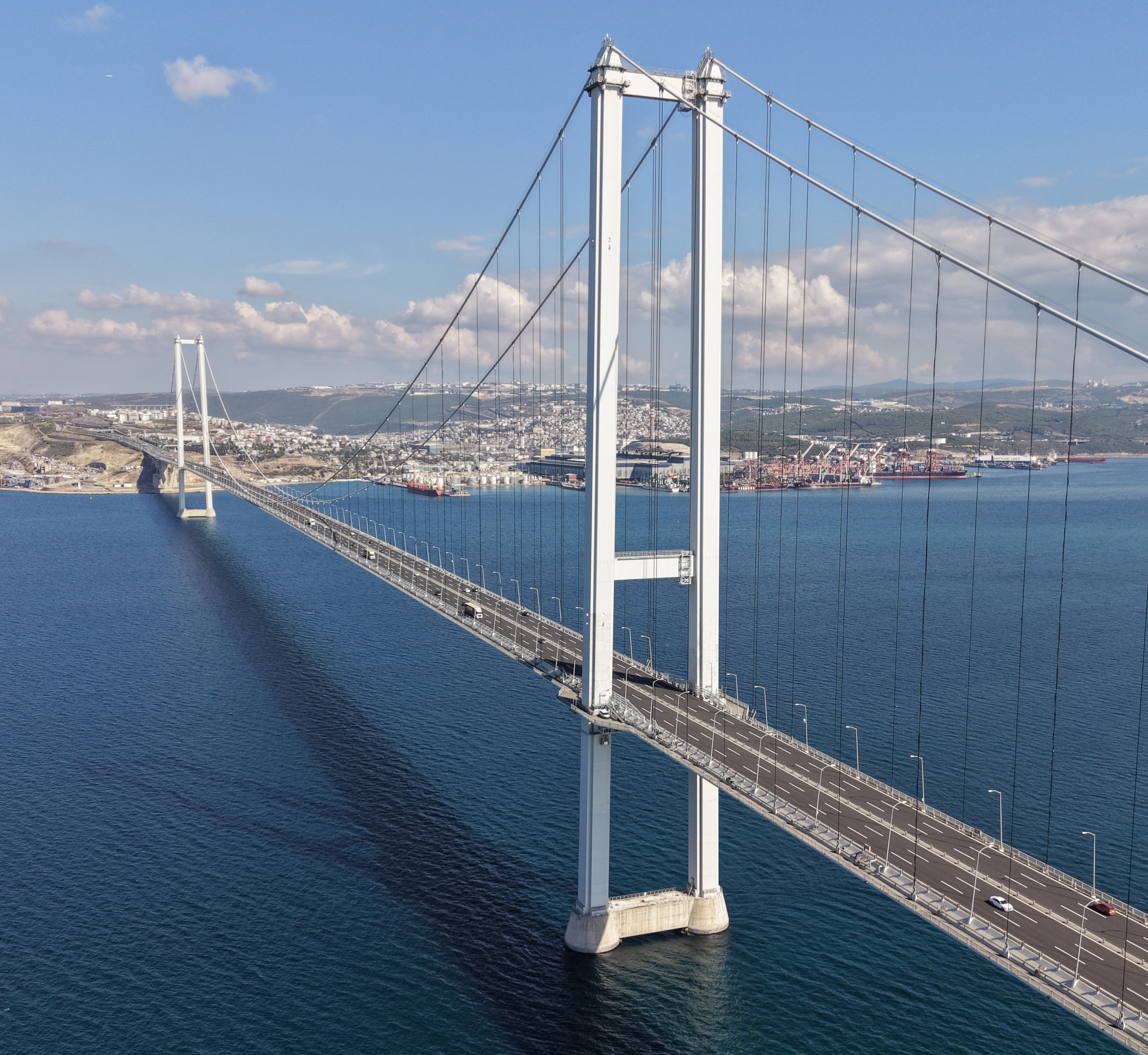
Osman Gazi Bridge on the Gulf of İzmit is one of the longest suspension bridges in the world.

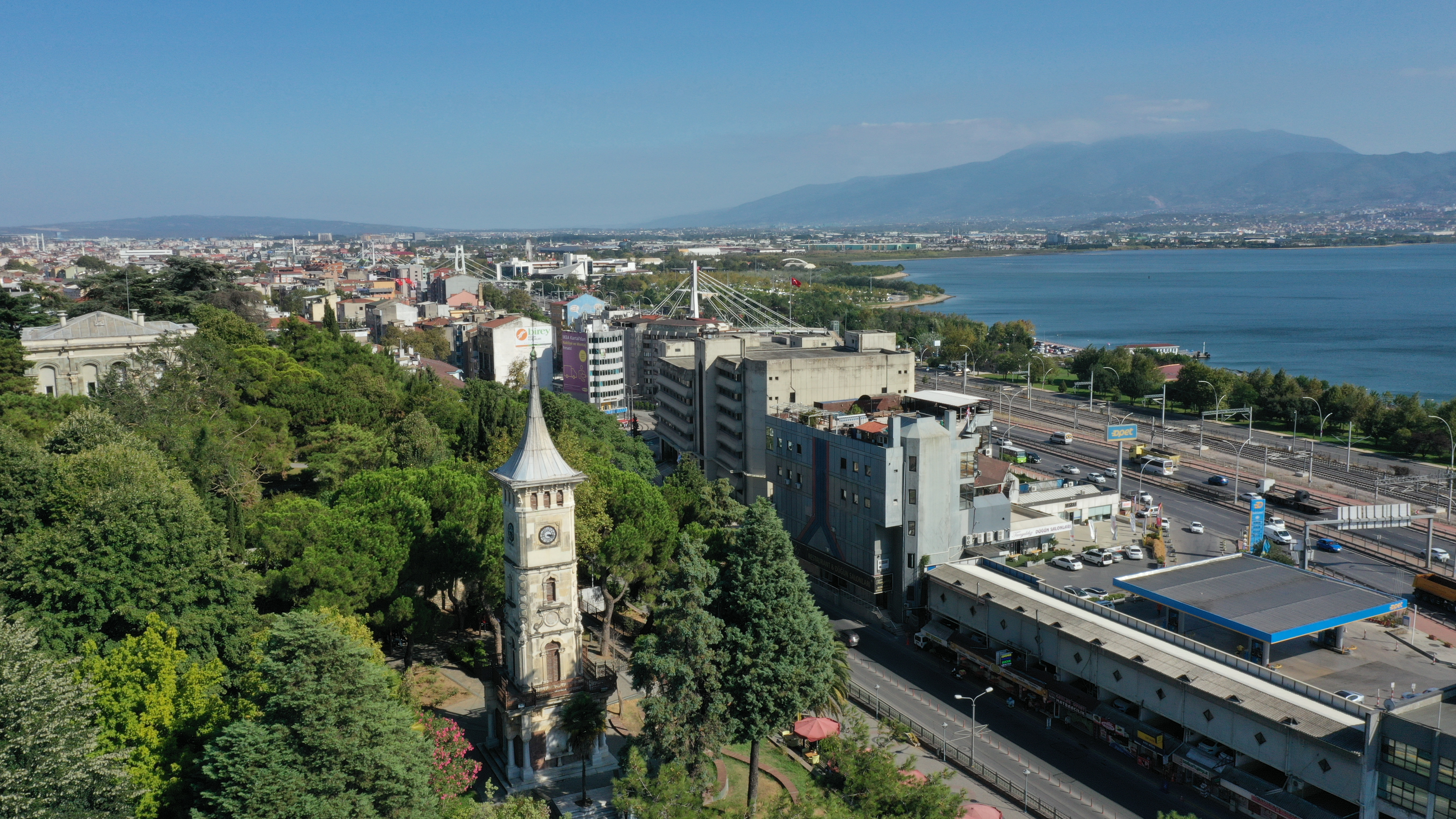
İzmit Clock Tower, with the Mimar Sinan Bridge and the coastal highway seen in the background.

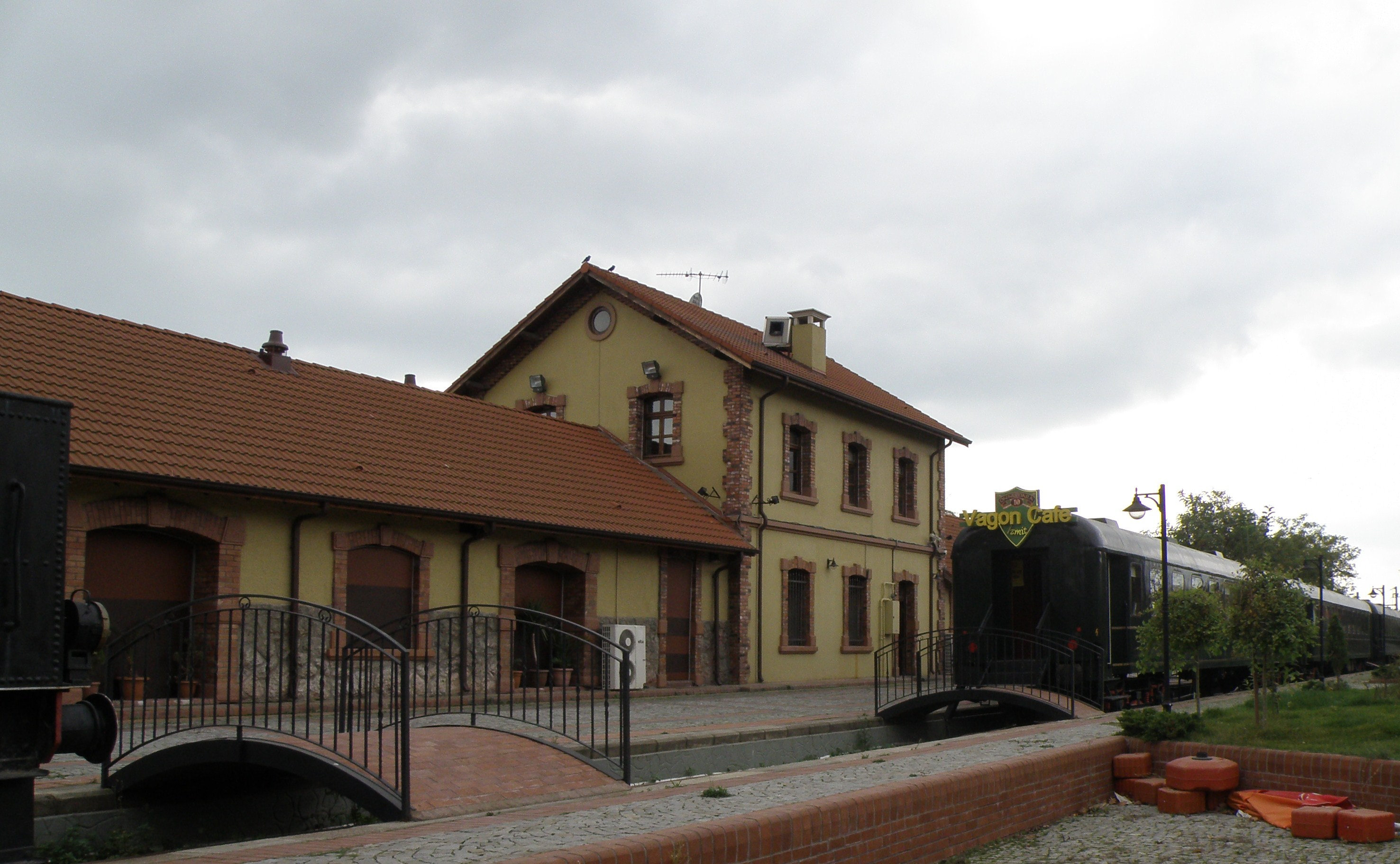
A historic railway station in Izmit

Located along the commercially-active Black Sea and Marmara Sea shorelines, Kocaeli boasts 5 ports and 35 industrial docks, making it an important communications center, as well as Anatolia's farthest inland contact point and a gateway to global markets. The main transportation routes, the D100 highway and the Trans European Motorway which connects Europe with Asia, along with railway lines, form an intercontinental passage network. İzmit Central railway station is one of the busiest in Turkey, built in 1977 to replace the original station.

Kocaeli neighbours one of the world's largest metropolitan centers, Istanbul. Its vicinity to Istanbul's two international airports (Sabiha Gökçen International Airport and Atatürk International Airport) which are 45 and 80 km (28 and 50 mi) away, respectively, from İzmit's city center, provides national and international connections.

On 1 March 1958, SS Üsküdar, a small passenger ferry sailing between İzmit and Değirmendere sank due to lodos weather. 272 people died including 38 students and seven crew. 37 passengers and two crew survived the disaster.

=== Public transport ===
Rail

First opened in 1873 and then sold to Chemins de fer Ottomans d'Anatolie until its reacqusition in 1927, İzmit railway station near the D.100 highway connects Ankara–Istanbul high-speed railway, the fastest and highest-volume rail line in Turkey.

Tram

Operated by Kocaeli Metropolitan Municipality, Akçaray is operational since 2017. The second line was opened in 2019 and the whole system of 16 stations has over 8 million annual ridership.

== Population ==
Historical population
Year	Pop.	±% p.a.
2008	306,515	—
2012	327,435	+1.66%
2017	360,409	+1.94%
2022	376,056	+0.85%
Source: TÜIK (2008-2022)

== Education ==
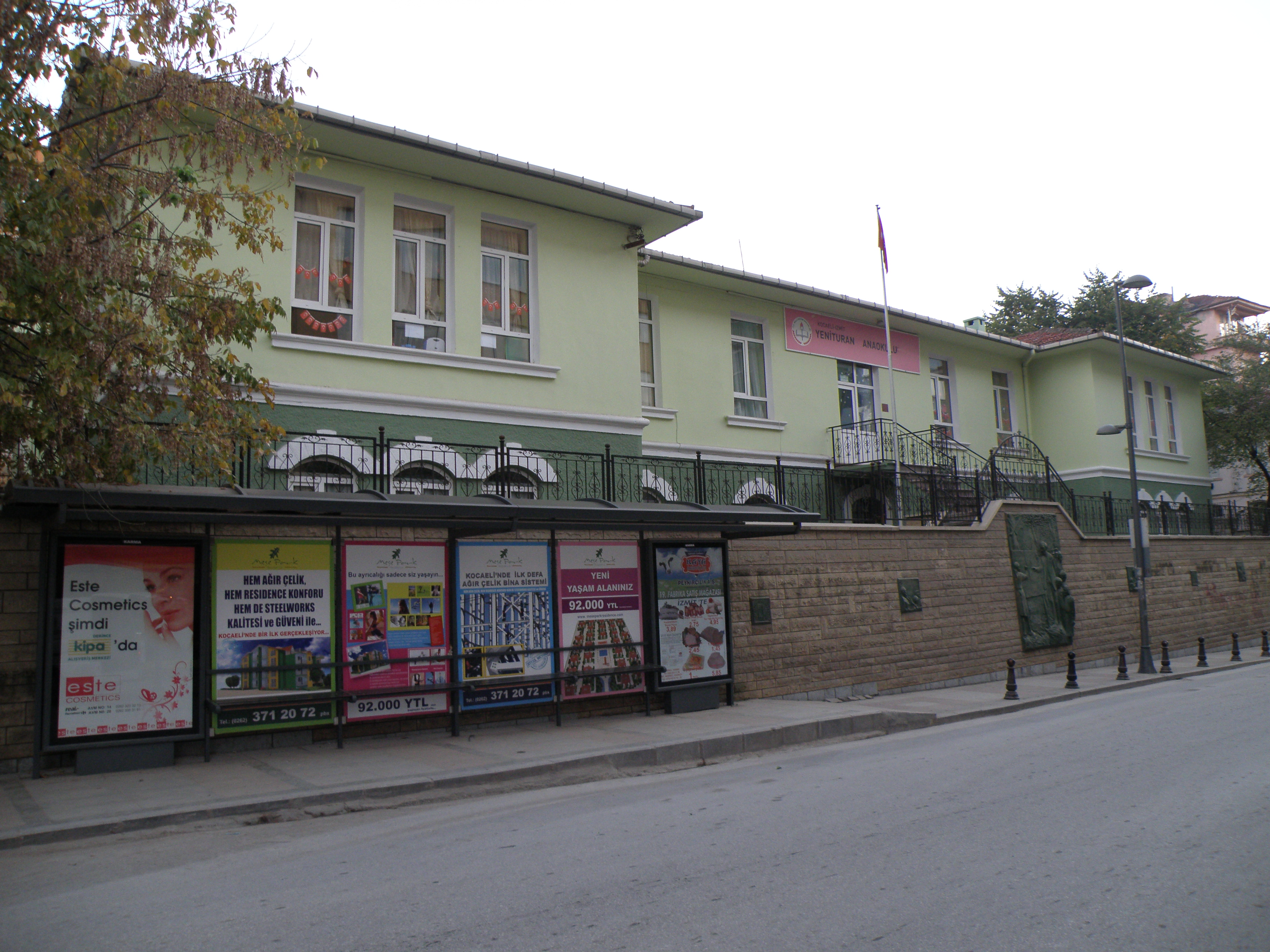
A pre-school building in İzmit

Kocaeli University (KOU) was established in the city in 1992. The university has more than 50,000 students. It has established a department of international relations that monitors Bologna developments closely and oversees KOU's participation in the Erasmus and Leonardo da Vinci student mobility schemes. With membership in the European University Association, KOU is aiming for greater international recognition of its academic work.

The university, while focusing on technical and engineering subjects, offers an extensive selection of courses in social sciences and arts as well. Some steps toward certification by ABET (Accreditation Board for Engineering and Technology) are being taken by the Faculty of Engineering, such as adaptation of course content in engineering majors.

== Climate ==
İzmit has a humid subtropical climate (Köppen: Cfa, Trewartha: Cf), which is warmer than its surroundings – largely due to its sheltered location – and noticeably wetter during summers than other locations on the northern Sea of Marmara coast further to the west. Summers are hot and often muggy, the average maximum temperature is around 30 °C (86 °F) in July and August, while winters are cool and wet, the average minimum temperature is between 0–4 °C (32–39 °F) in January. Precipitation is high and fairly evenly distributed the year round; it is heaviest in late fall and winter. İzmit has a record high temperature of 44.1 °C (111 °F) in July 2000, which is exceptionally high for the region, and a record low of −18.0 °C (0 °F) in February 1929. Snowfall is fairly common, and İzmit's snow depth record is 90 cm (35 in) in February 1929.

Climate data for Akçakoca, İzmit (1991–2020, extremes 1929–2023)
Month	Jan	Feb	Mar	Apr	May	Jun	Jul	Aug	Sep	Oct	Nov	Dec	Year
Record high °C (°F)	24.9 (76.8)	26.7 (80.1)	30.8 (87.4)	35.0 (95.0)	37.2 (99.0)	40.7 (105.3)	44.1 (111.4)	42.9 (109.2)	40.2 (104.4)	36.2 (97.2)	30.0 (86.0)	27.4 (81.3)	44.1 (111.4)
Mean daily maximum °C (°F)	10.0 (50.0)	11.3 (52.3)	14.0 (57.2)	18.9 (66.0)	23.8 (74.8)	28.1 (82.6)	30.3 (86.5)	30.5 (86.9)	26.7 (80.1)	21.6 (70.9)	16.6 (61.9)	12.0 (53.6)	20.3 (68.5)
Daily mean °C (°F)	6.4 (43.5)	7.1 (44.8)	9.2 (48.6)	13.2 (55.8)	18.0 (64.4)	22.3 (72.1)	24.5 (76.1)	24.8 (76.6)	21.1 (70.0)	16.7 (62.1)	12.2 (54.0)	8.4 (47.1)	15.3 (59.5)
Mean daily minimum °C (°F)	3.5 (38.3)	3.9 (39.0)	5.5 (41.9)	8.9 (48.0)	13.5 (56.3)	17.6 (63.7)	19.8 (67.6)	20.4 (68.7)	16.9 (62.4)	13.3 (55.9)	8.8 (47.8)	5.6 (42.1)	11.5 (52.7)
Record low °C (°F)	−13.1 (8.4)	−18.0 (−0.4)	−6.5 (20.3)	−1.0 (30.2)	1.8 (35.2)	4.0 (39.2)	10.1 (50.2)	10.9 (51.6)	4.9 (40.8)	2.4 (36.3)	−3.4 (25.9)	−8.8 (16.2)	−18.0 (−0.4)
Average precipitation mm (inches)	100.1 (3.94)	76.8 (3.02)	77.8 (3.06)	54.3 (2.14)	55.4 (2.18)	64.1 (2.52)	48.3 (1.90)	50.2 (1.98)	52.0 (2.05)	86.4 (3.40)	74.7 (2.94)	110.1 (4.33)	850.2 (33.47)
Average rainy days	17.2	15.4	14.27	11.3	9.7	9.77	6	5.07	8.13	12.3	12.5	16.8	138.44
Average relative humidity (%)	77.0	75.1	73.0	70.1	70.3	69.0	69.0	70.9	71.7	76.1	75.6	75.1	72.7
Mean monthly sunshine hours	72.5	83.9	125.5	175.8	216.8	258.3	288.4	267.0	204.4	135.6	101.5	74.5	2,000.1
Mean daily sunshine hours	2.5	3.1	4.3	5.9	7.0	8.7	9.3	8.7	6.8	4.5	3.5	2.5	5.6
Source 1: Turkish State Meteorological Service
Source 2: NOAA (humidity, sun 1991-2020)

Climate data for Cengiz Topel Naval Air Station, Kocaeli (2013-2023)
Month	Jan	Feb	Mar	Apr	May	Jun	Jul	Aug	Sep	Oct	Nov	Dec	Year
Mean daily maximum °C (°F)	10.9 (51.6)	12.7 (54.9)	14.7 (58.5)	19.6 (67.3)	24.0 (75.2)	27.6 (81.7)	29.7 (85.5)	30.6 (87.1)	27.2 (81.0)	21.6 (70.9)	17.7 (63.9)	12.9 (55.2)	20.8 (69.4)
Daily mean °C (°F)	5.8 (42.4)	7.1 (44.8)	8.6 (47.5)	12.1 (53.8)	16.7 (62.1)	20.5 (68.9)	22.5 (72.5)	23.6 (74.5)	19.9 (67.8)	15.2 (59.4)	11.6 (52.9)	7.6 (45.7)	14.3 (57.7)
Mean daily minimum °C (°F)	0.5 (32.9)	1.5 (34.7)	2.5 (36.5)	4.7 (40.5)	9.4 (48.9)	13.5 (56.3)	15.3 (59.5)	16.6 (61.9)	12.6 (54.7)	8.7 (47.7)	5.4 (41.7)	2.4 (36.3)	7.8 (46.0)
Average precipitation mm (inches)	93.4 (3.68)	83.6 (3.29)	78.2 (3.08)	60.2 (2.37)	61.1 (2.41)	84.5 (3.33)	49.1 (1.93)	62.4 (2.46)	60.8 (2.39)	95.0 (3.74)	69.8 (2.75)	103.7 (4.08)	901.8 (35.51)
Average extreme snow depth cm (inches)	13.8 (5.4)	9.2 (3.6)	3.2 (1.3)	0.0 (0.0)	0.0 (0.0)	0.0 (0.0)	0.0 (0.0)	0.0 (0.0)	0.0 (0.0)	0.0 (0.0)	0.0 (0.0)	4.7 (1.9)	17.5 (6.9)
Source: Infoclimat

== Gallery ==
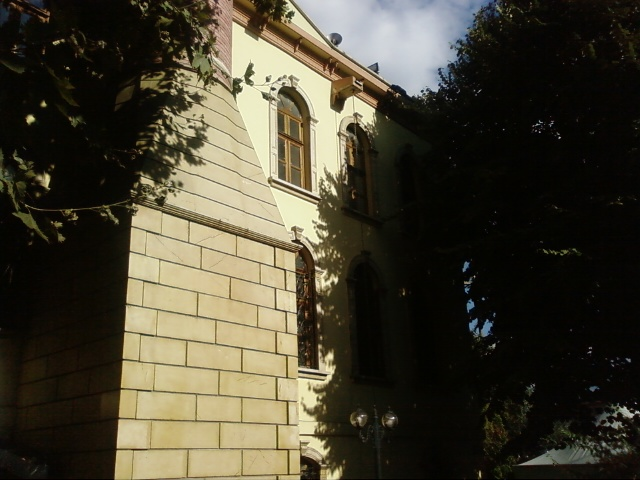
Fevziye Mosque

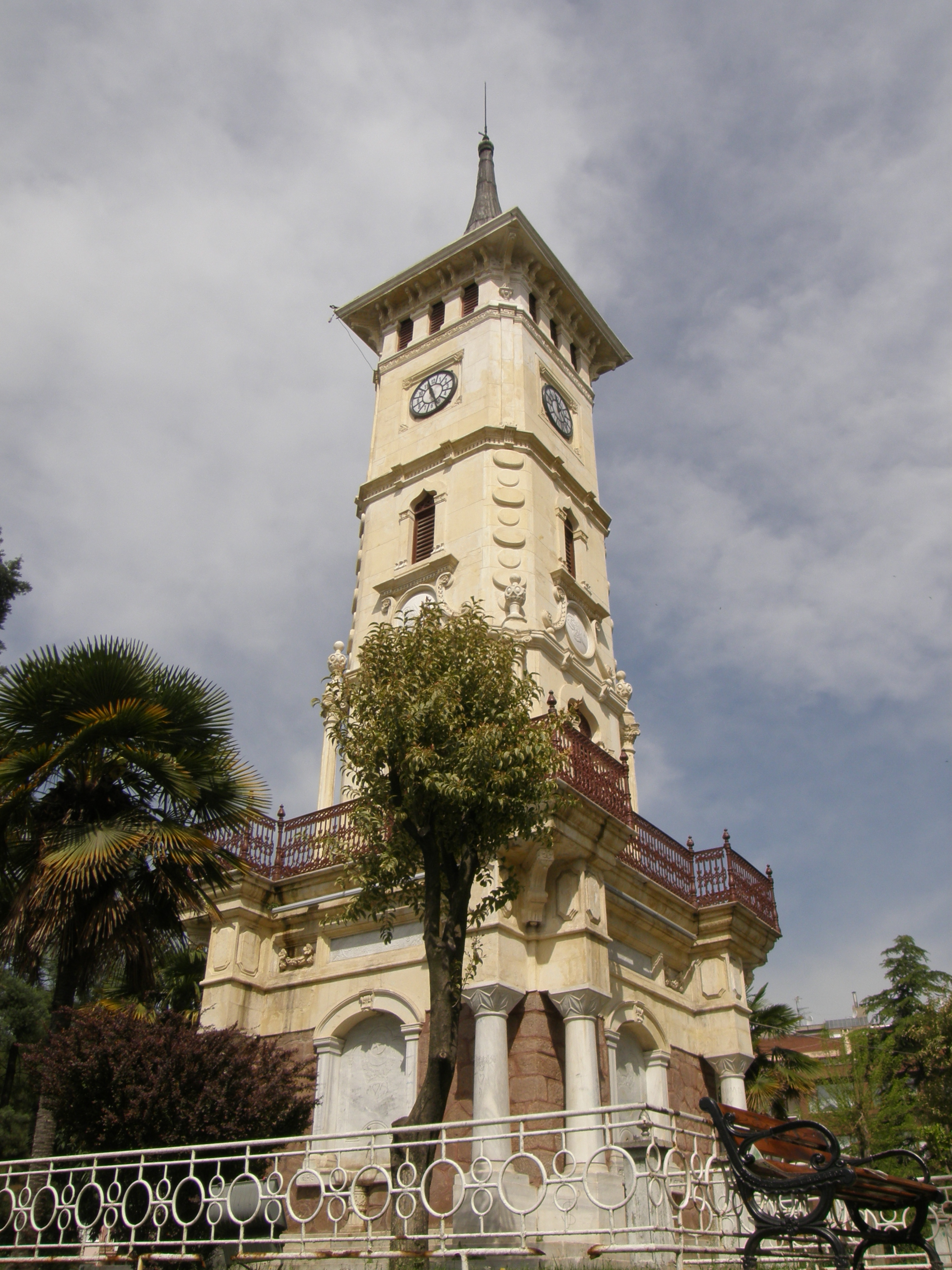
İzmit Clock Tower

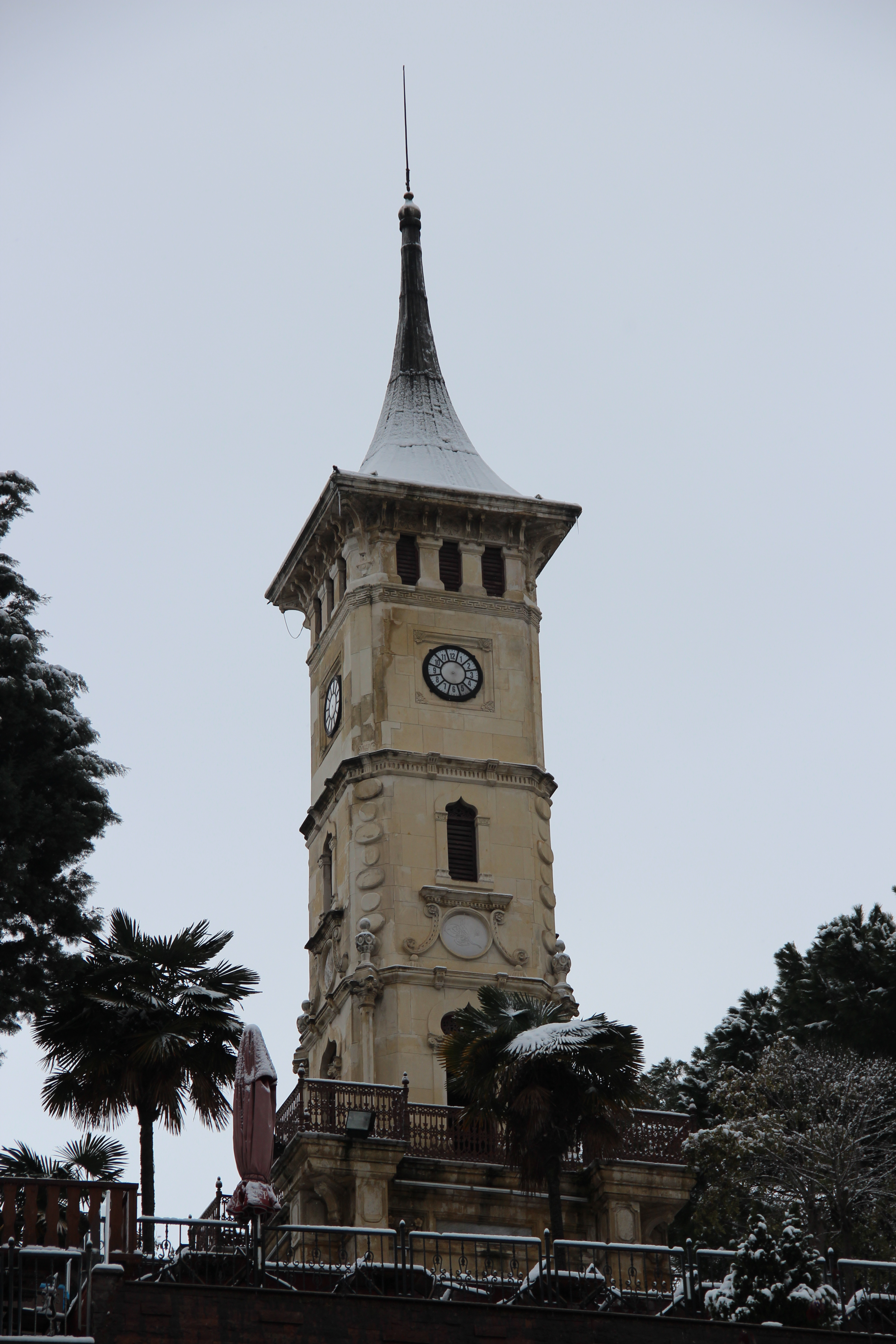
İzmit Clock Tower

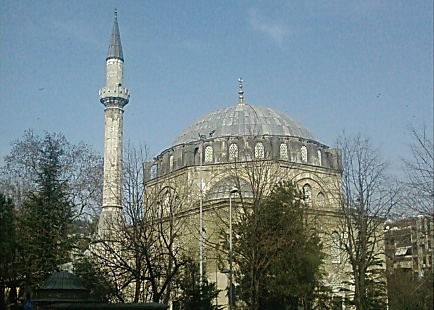
Pertev Paşa Mosque

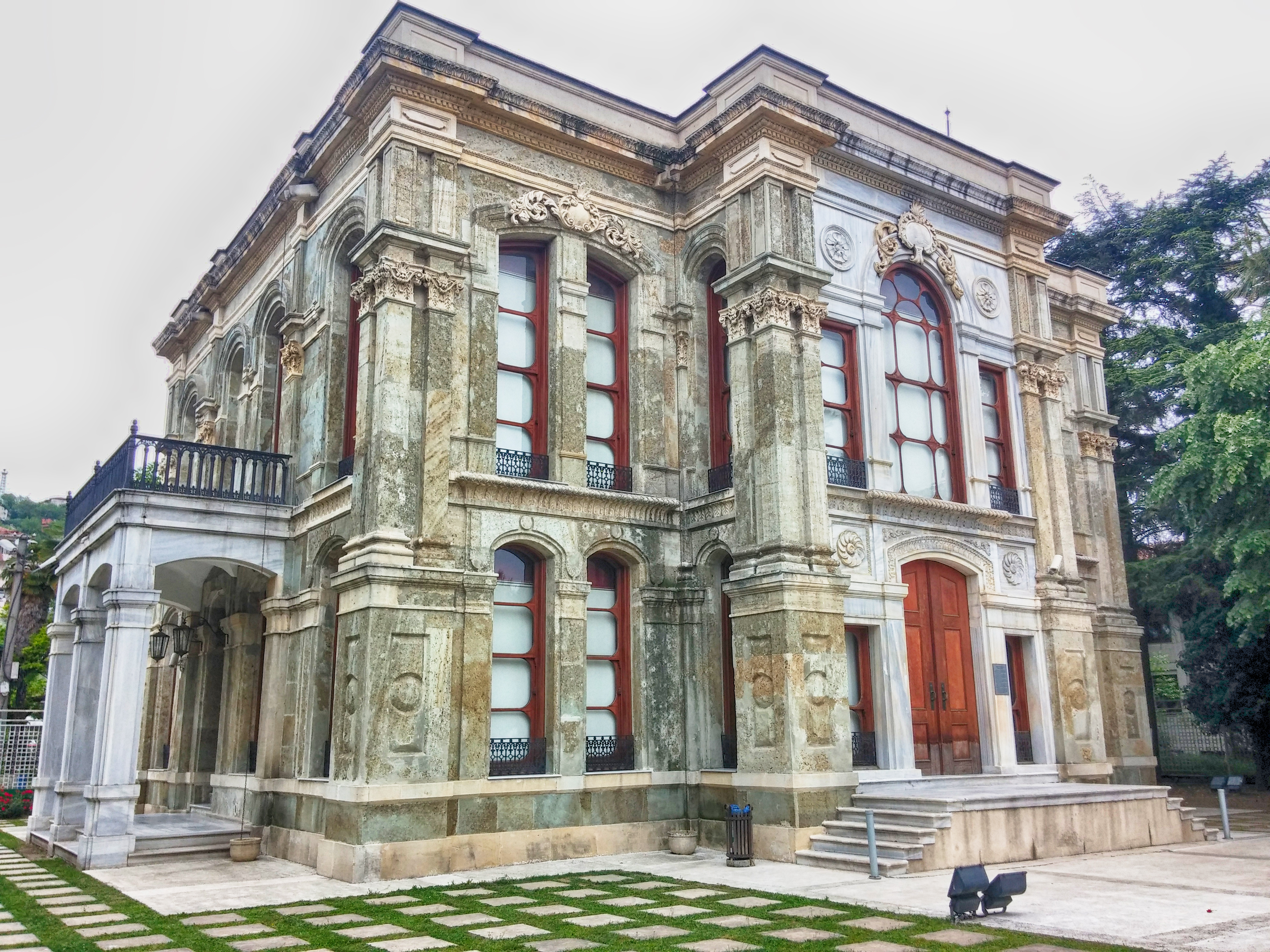
Kasr-ı Hümayun

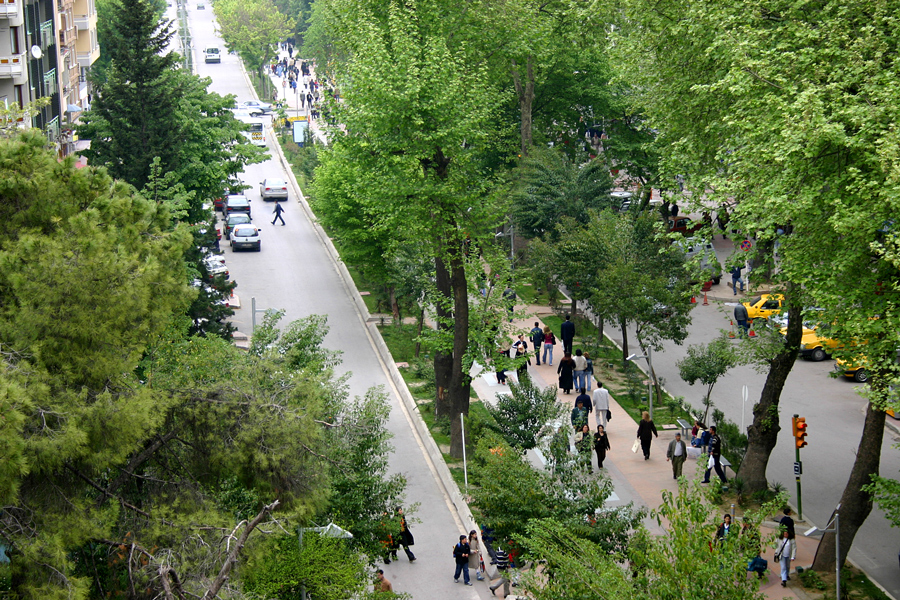
A view from İzmit's Demiryolu Avenue

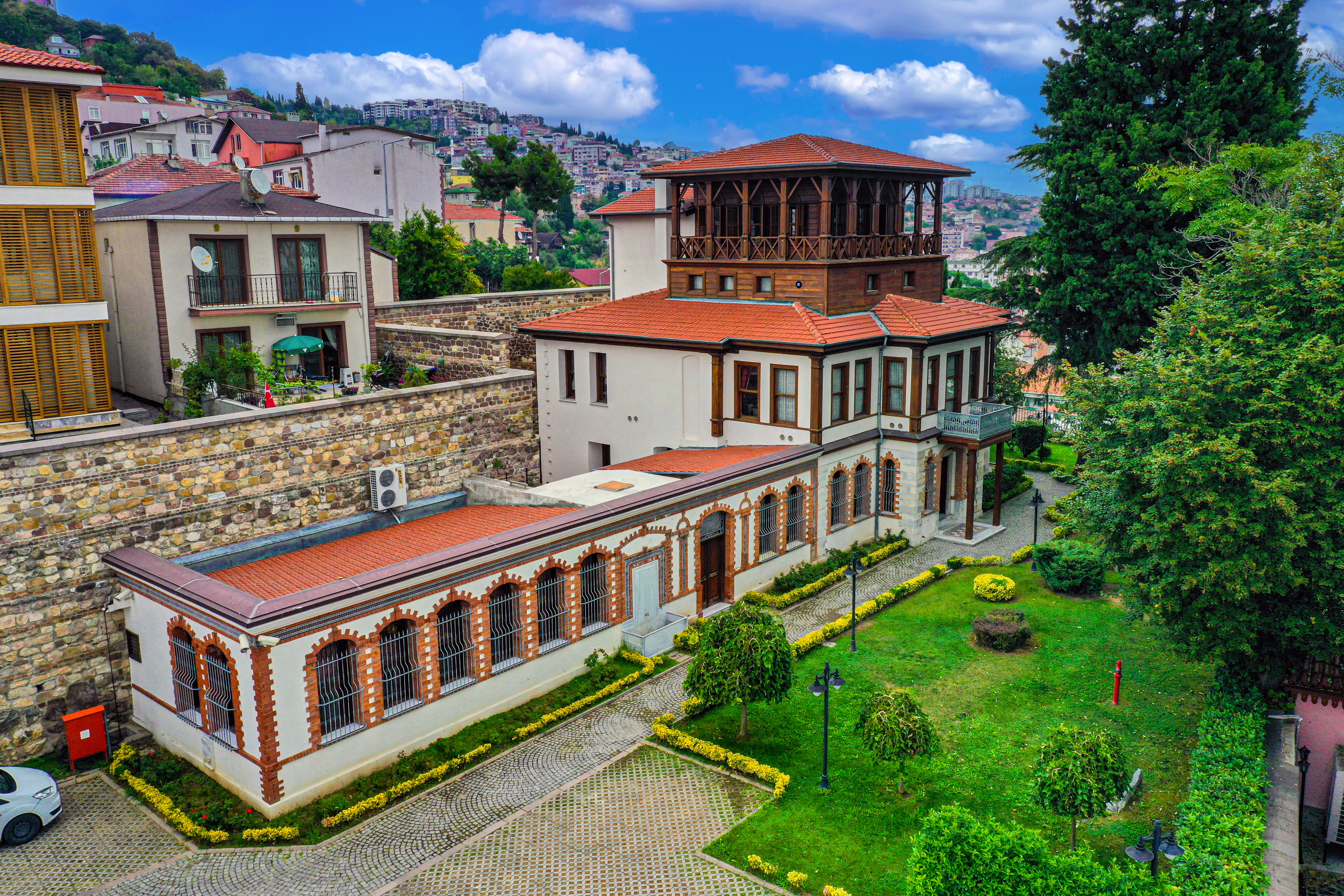
Selim Sırrı Paşa Congress

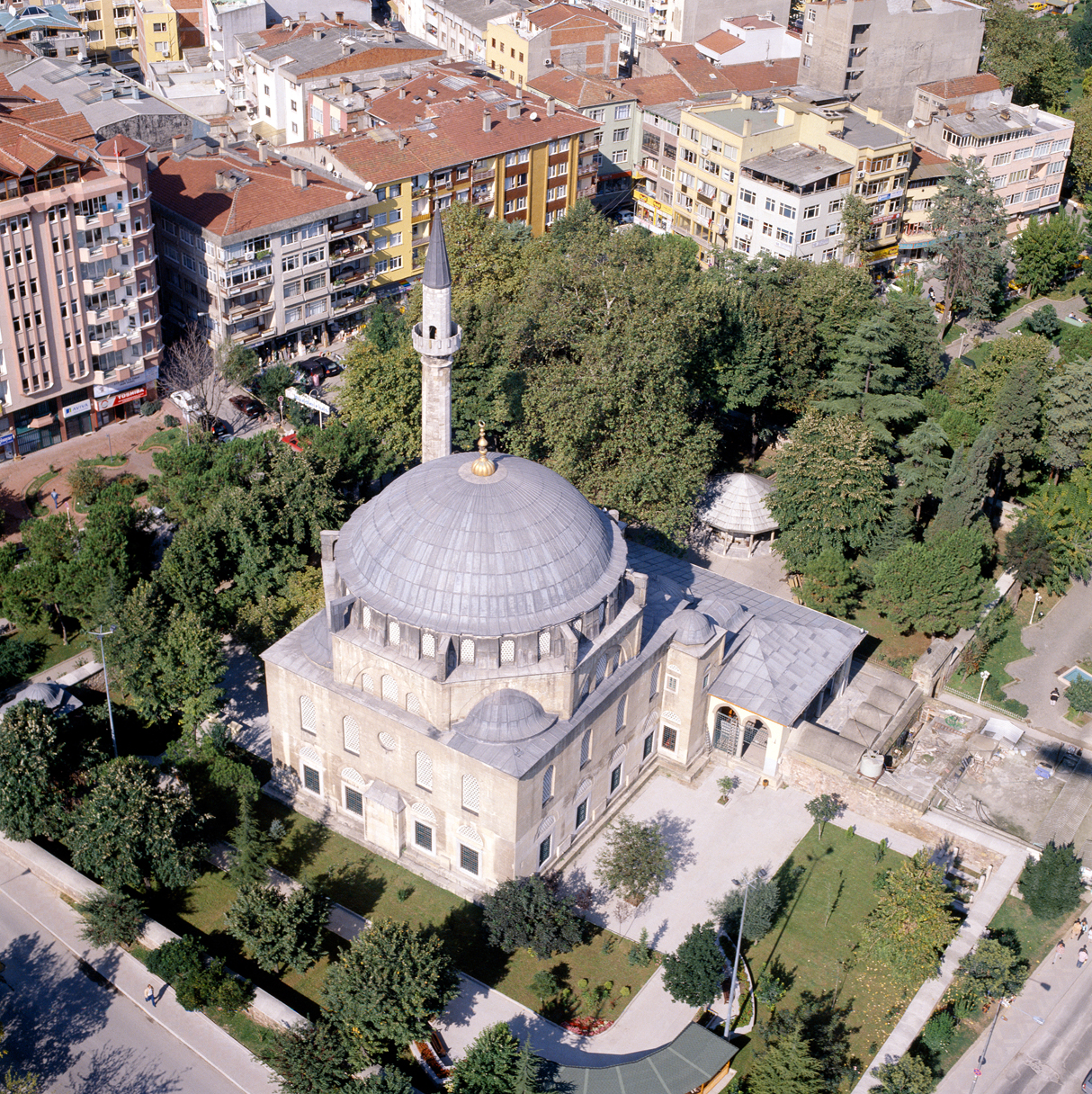
Yeni Cuma Mosque

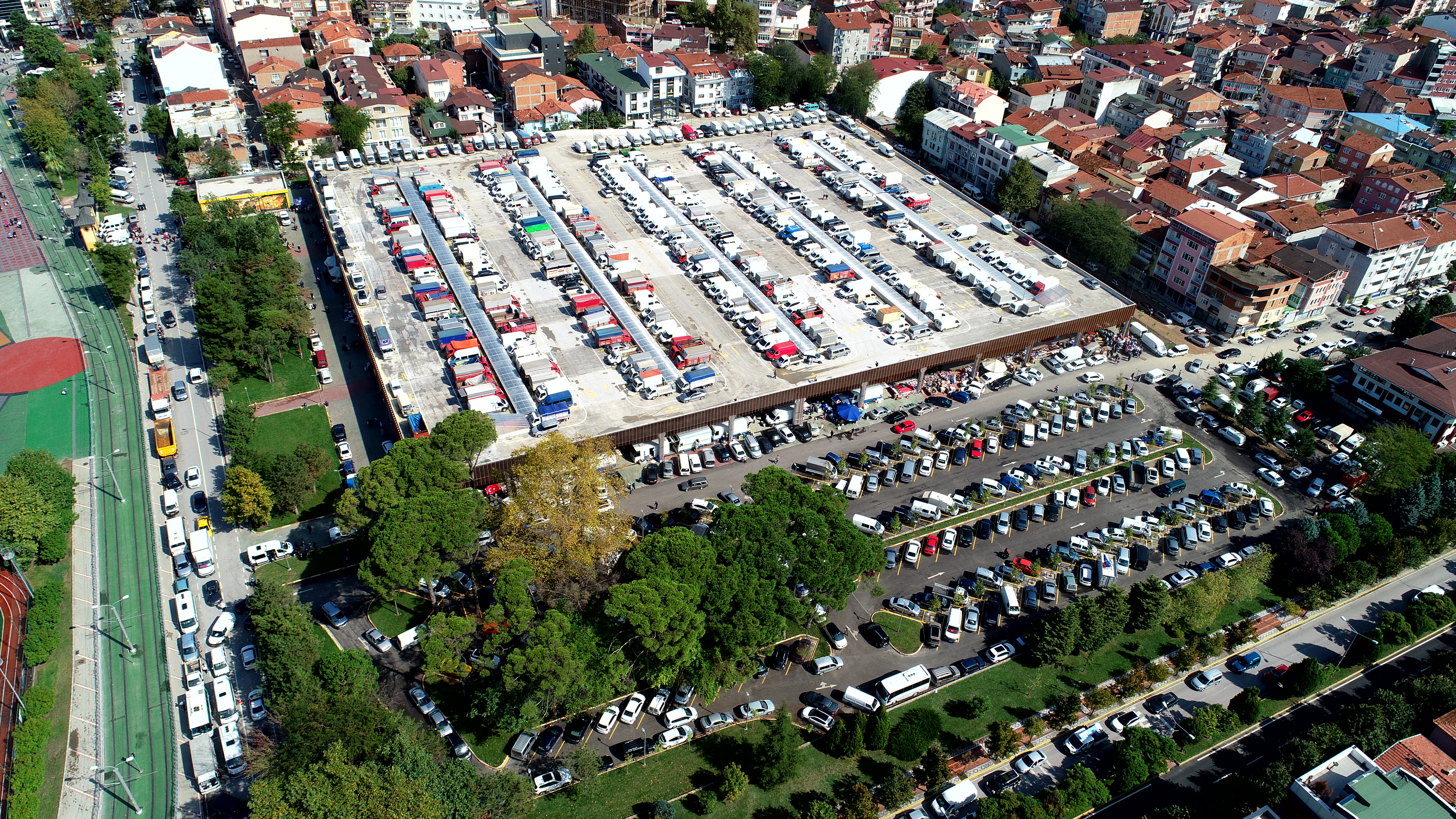
İzmit Perşembe Market

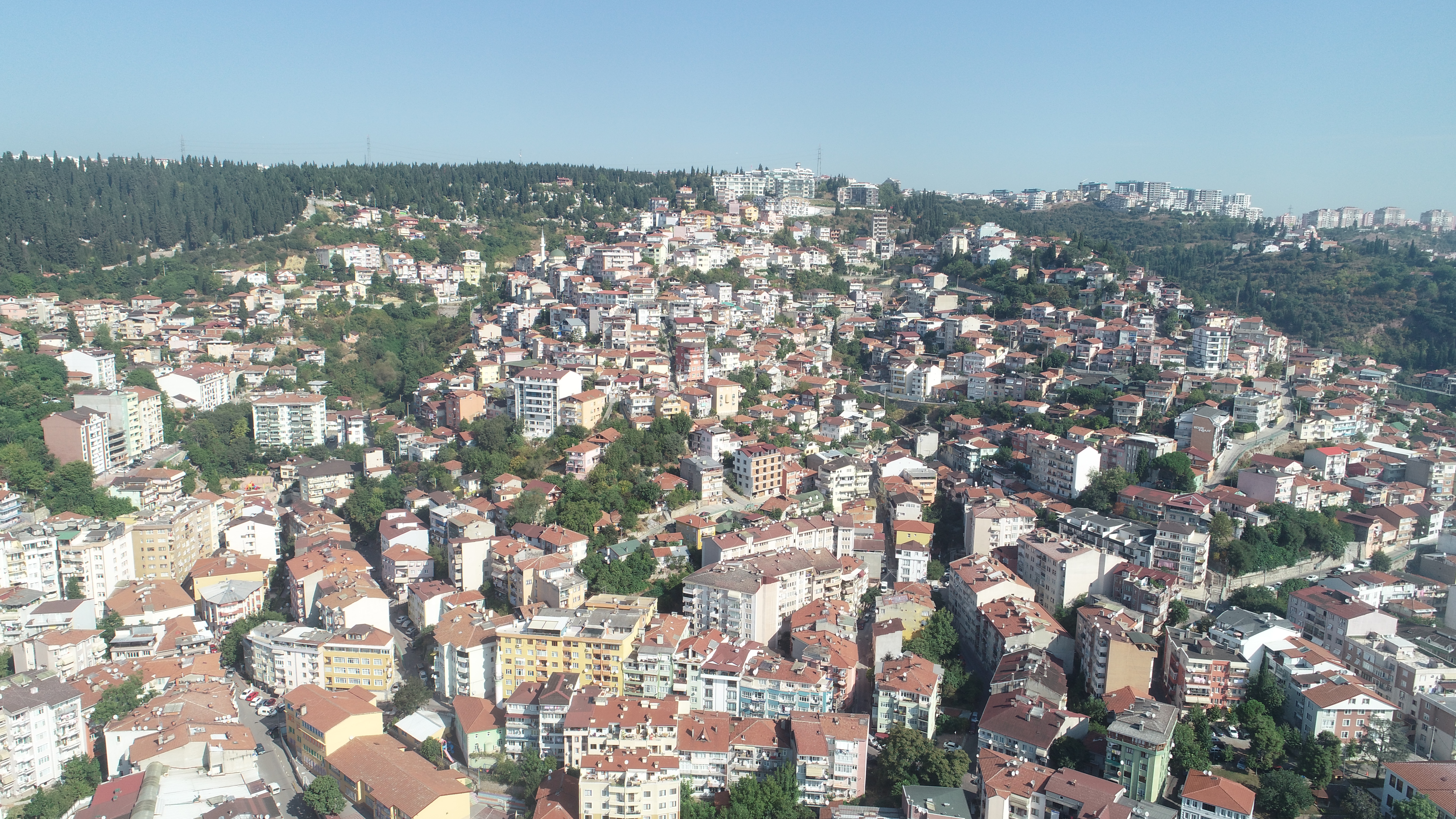
Izmit view

== Historic and modern sites in and around İzmit ==
- Agora of İzmit
- Citadel of İzmit
- Temple of Augustus of İzmit
- İzmit Clock Tower
- İzmit Bay Bridge

== Twin towns – sister cities ==
İzmit is twinned with:

- Agios Sergios, Northern Cyprus
- Buk (Busan), South Korea
- Čair (Skopje), North Macedonia
- Ceadîr-Lunga, Moldova
- Centar Župa, North Macedonia
- Ilidža, Bosnia and Herzegovina
- Karachi, Pakistan
- Kassel, Germany
- Kastrychnitski (Minsk), Belarus
- Kherson, Ukraine
- Momchilgrad, Bulgaria
- Nəsimi (Baku), Azerbaijan
- Pohang, South Korea
- Tiznit, Morocco
- Travnik, Bosnia and Herzegovina
- (Georgia (country)) Vake-Saburtalo (Tbilisi), Georgia
- Vogošća, Bosnia and Herzegovina

== Sport ==
The city's main football club is Kocaelispor, with fans all across the province. The city is also home to women's football team Derince Belediyespor. The multi-sport club Kocaeli B.B. Kağıt S.K. has several sports sections covering a wide range disciplines. Cycling is popular with local team Brisaspor and the Tour of Marmara is hosted.

The city also hosted the following tournaments:

- 2012 European Junior Open Water Swimming Championships
- 2012–13 Turkish Cup Basketball
- 2013 IIHF World Championship Division II
- 2014 IIHF World U18 Championship Division III
- 2014–15 EHF Champions League group stage
- 2015 Boys' Youth European Volleyball Championship

== People ==
- Zareh Moskofian (1898–1987), Armenian painter
- Saint Pantaleon (c. 275–305), Christian Saint and martyr
- Mihran Azaryan, Ottoman Armenian and Turkish architect who is best known for having designed and constructed the Büyükada Pier and possibly the Izmit Clock Tower.
- Demet Özdemir (born 1992), actress and former dancer

== See also ==
- Astacus in Bithynia
- Nicomedia
- Izmit massacres
