= Kabaoğlu, İzmit =

Kabaoğlu
- Neighbourhood
- Location in Turkey Kabaoğlu (Marmara)
- Coordinates: 40°48′52.92″N 29°55′44.04″E
- Country: Turkey
- Province: Kocaeli
- District: İzmit
- Time zone: UTC+3 (TRT)

Kabaoğlu is a neighbourhood of the municipality and district of İzmit, Kocaeli Province, Turkey.
