= Orhan, İzmit =

Orhan
- Neighbourhood
- Location in Turkey Orhan (Marmara)
- Coordinates: 40°46′37.16″N 29°55′30.9″E
- Country: Turkey
- Province: Kocaeli
- District: İzmit
- Time zone: UTC+3 (TRT)

Orhan is a neighbourhood of the municipality and district of İzmit, Kocaeli Province, Turkey.
