= Fethiye, İzmit =

Fethiye
- Neighbourhood
- Location in Turkey Fethiye (Marmara)
- Coordinates: 40°55′22.8″N 29°58′30″E
- Country: Turkey
- Province: Kocaeli
- District: İzmit
- Time zone: UTC+3 (TRT)

Fethiye is a neighbourhood of the municipality and district of İzmit, Kocaeli Province, Turkey.
