= Yahyakaptan, İzmit =

Yahyakaptan
- Neighbourhood
- Location in Turkey Yahyakaptan (Marmara)
- Coordinates: 40°46′4.99″N 29°58′14.18″E
- Country: Turkey
- Province: Kocaeli
- District: İzmit
- Time zone: UTC+3 (TRT)

Yahyakaptan is a neighbourhood of the municipality and district of İzmit, Kocaeli Province, Turkey.
