= Tüysüzler, İzmit =

Tüysüzler
- Neighbourhood
- Location in Turkey Tüysüzler (Marmara)
- Coordinates: 40°47′1.93″N 29°55′19.56″E
- Country: Turkey
- Province: Kocaeli
- District: İzmit
- Time zone: UTC+3 (TRT)

Tüysüzler is a neighbourhood of the municipality and district of İzmit, Kocaeli Province, Turkey.
