= Mehmet Ali Paşa, İzmit =

Mehmet Ali Paşa
- Neighbourhood
- Location in Turkey Mehmet Ali Paşa (Marmara)
- Coordinates: 40°46′2.35″N 29°57′6.88″E
- Country: Turkey
- Province: Kocaeli
- District: İzmit
- Time zone: UTC+3 (TRT)

Mehmet Ali Paşa is a neighbourhood of the municipality and district of İzmit, Kocaeli Province, Turkey.
