= List of populated places in Kocaeli Province =

Districts of Kocaeli

Below is the list of populated places in Kocaeli Province, Turkey by the districts. İzmit is the capital of the province. In the following lists, the first place in each district list is the administrative center of that district.

== İzmit ==
- İzmit
- Ambarcı, İzmit
- Arızlı, İzmit
- Arpalıkihsaniye, İzmit
- Bağlıca, İzmit
- Balören, İzmit
- Bayraktar, İzmit
- Biberoğlu, İzmit
- Böğürgen, İzmit
- Bulduk, İzmit
- Çağırgan, İzmit
- Çavuşoğlu, İzmit
- Çayırköy, İzmit
- Çubuklubala, İzmit
- Çubukluosmaniye, İzmit
- Dağköy, İzmit
- Düğmeciler, İzmit
- Durhasan, İzmit
- Emirhan, İzmit
- Eseler, İzmit
- Fethiye, İzmit
- Gedikli, İzmit
- Gökçeören, İzmit
- Gülbahçe Kadriye, İzmit
- Güvercinlik, İzmit
- Hakaniye, İzmit
- Hasancıklar, İzmit
- Kabaoğlu, İzmit
- Karaabdülbaki, İzmit
- Kaynarca, İzmit
- Kısalar, İzmit
- Kozluca, İzmit
- Kozluk, İzmit
- Kulfallı, İzmit
- Kulmahmut, İzmit
- Kurtdere, İzmit
- Mecidiye, İzmit
- Mehmet Ali Paşa, İzmit
- Nebihoca, İzmit
- Orhan, İzmit
- Orhaniye, İzmit
- Ortaburun, İzmit
- Sapakpınar, İzmit
- Sarışeyh, İzmit
- Sekbanlı, İzmit
- Sepetçi, İzmit
- Süleymaniye, İzmit
- Sultaniye, İzmit
- Süverler, İzmit
- Şahinler, İzmit
- Tüysüzler, İzmit
- Yahyakaptan, İzmit
- Yassıbağ, İzmit
- Yenice, İzmit
- Zeytinburnu, İzmit

== Başiskele ==
- Başiskele
- Aksığın, Başiskele
- Camidüzü, Başiskele
- Doğantepe, Başiskele
- Kazandere, Başiskele
- Serindere, Başiskele
- Servetiye Cami, Başiskele
- Servetiye Karşı, Başiskele
- Tepecik, Başiskele

== Derince ==
- Derince
- Çavuşlu, Derince
- Geredeli, Derince
- Karagöllü, Derince
- Kaşıkçı, Derince
- Tahtalı, Derince
- Terziler, Derince
- Toylar, Derince

== Dilovası ==
- Dilovası
- Çerkeşli, Dilovası
- Demirciler, Dilovası
- Köseler, Dilovası
- Tepecik, Dilovası

== Gebze ==
- Gebze
- Ahatlı, Gebze
- Balçık, Gebze
- Cumaköy, Gebze
- Denizli, Gebze
- Duraklı, Gebze
- Elbizli, Gebze
- Eskihisar, Gebze
- Hatipler, Gebze
- Güzeller, Gebze
- Kadıllı, Gebze
- Kargalı, Gebze
- Kirazpınar, Gebze
- Mollafeneri, Gebze
- Muallim, Gebze
- Mudarlı, Gebze
- Ovacık, Gebze
- Pelitli, Gebze
- Tavşanlı M, Gebze
- Tepepanayır, Gebze
- Yağcılar, Gebze

== Gölcük ==
- Gölcük
- Ayvazpınarı, Gölcük
- Eskiferhadiye, Gölcük
- Ferhadiye, Gölcük
- Hamidiye, Gölcük
- Hasaneyn, Gölcük
- İcadiye, Gölcük
- İrşadiye, Gölcük
- Lütfiye, Gölcük
- Mamuriye, Gölcük
- Mesruriye, Gölcük
- Nimetiye, Gölcük
- Nüzhetiye, Gölcük
- Örcün, Gölcük
- Panayır, Gölcük
- Saraylı, Gölcük
- Selimiye, Gölcük
- Siyretiye, Gölcük
- Sofular, Gölcük
- Şevketiye, Gölcük
- Ümmiye Köyü, Gölcük

== Kandıra ==
- Kandıra
- Ağaçağıl, Kandıra
- Ahmethacılar, Kandıra
- Akçabeyli, Kandıra
- Akçakese, Kandıra
- Akçaova, Kandıra
- Akıncı, Kandıra
- Alefli, Kandıra
- Antaplı, Kandıra
- Avdan, Kandıra
- Babaköy, Kandıra
- Babalı, Kandıra
- Bağırganlı, Kandıra
- Balaban, Kandıra
- Balcı, Kandıra
- Ballar, Kandıra
- Beyce, Kandıra
- Beylerbeyi, Kandıra
- Bolu, Kandıra
- Bozburun, Kandıra
- Cebeci, Kandıra
- Çakırcaali, Kandıra
- Çakmaklar, Kandıra
- Çalca, Kandıra
- Çalköy, Kandıra
- Çalyer, Kandıra
- Çamkonak, Kandıra
- Çerçili, Kandıra
- Dalca, Kandıra
- Deliveli, Kandıra
- Doğancılı, Kandıra
- Döngelli, Kandıra
- Duraçali, Kandıra
- Duraklı, Kandıra
- Eğercili, Kandıra
- Elmacık, Kandıra
- Esentepe, Kandıra
- Ferizli, Kandıra
- Gebeşler, Kandıra
- Goncaaydın, Kandıra
- Hacılar, Kandıra
- Hacımazlı, Kandıra
- Hacışeyh, Kandıra
- Hediyeli, Kandıra
- Hıdırlar, Kandıra
- Hüdaverdiler, Kandıra
- İncecik, Kandıra
- Kabaağaç, Kandıra
- Kanatlar, Kandıra
- Karaağaç, Kandıra
- Karadivan, Kandıra
- Karlı, Kandıra
- Kaymaz, Kandıra
- Kaymaz Erikli, Kandıra
- Kefken, Kandıra
- Kıncıllı, Kandıra
- Kırkarmut, Kandıra
- Kızılcapınar, Kandıra
- Kocakaymas, Kandıra
- Kubuzcu, Kandıra
- Kurtyeri, Kandıra
- Lokmanlı, Kandıra
- Mancarlar, Kandıra
- Merkez Erikli, Kandıra
- Mülküşehsuvar, Kandıra
- Nasuhlar Köyü, Kandıra
- Ömerli Köyü, Kandıra
- Özbey Köyü, Kandıra
- Pelitpınarı Köyü, Kandıra
- Pınardüzü Köyü, Kandıra
- Pınarlı Köyü, Kandıra
- Pirceler Köyü, Kandıra
- Safalı Köyü, Kandıra
- Sarıahmetler, Kandıra
- Sarıcaali, Kandıra
- Sarıgazi, Kandıra
- Sarnıçlar, Kandıra
- Selametli, Kandıra
- Selimköy, Kandıra
- Sepetçi, Kandıra
- Sinanlıbilallı, Kandıra
- Sucuali, Kandıra
- Süllü, Kandıra
- Şerefsungur, Kandıra
- Seyitaliler, Kandıra
- Tatarahmet, Kandıra
- Teksen, Kandıra
- Terziler, Kandıra
- Topluca, Kandıra
- Üğümce, Kandıra
- Yağcılar, Kandıra
- Yusufça, Kandıra

== Kartepe ==
- Kartepe
- Balaban, Kartepe
- Eşmeahmediye, Kartepe
- Havluburun, Kartepe
- Karatepe, Kartepe
- Ketenciler, Kartepe
- Maşukiye
- Nusretiye, Kartepe
- Pazarçayırı, Kartepe
- Serinlik, Kartepe
- Şirinsulhiye, Kartepe
- Sultaniye, Kartepe

== Körfez ==
- Körfez
- Alihocalar, Körfez
- Belen, Körfez
- Çıraklı, Körfez
- Cuma, Körfez
- Dere, Körfez
- Dikenli, Körfez
- Elmacık, Körfez
- Himmetli, Körfez
- Kalburcu, Körfez
- Karayakuplu, Körfez
- Kutluca, Körfez
- Naip, Körfez
- Osmanlı, Körfez
- Şemsettin, Körfez
- Sevindikli, Körfez
- Sipahiler, Körfez

== Recent development ==
According to Law act no 6360, all Turkish provinces with a population more than 750 000, were renamed as metropolitan municipality. All districts in those provinces became second level municipalities and all villages in those districts were renamed as a neighborhoods. Thus the villages listed above are officially neighborhoods of Kocaeli.
