= Elbizli =

Village in Kocaeli, Turkey

Coordinates: 40°56′31″N 29°43′39″E

Elbizli is a village (officially a neighborhood) in Gebze District, Kocaeli Province, Turkey. Its population is 151 (2023).

It is bordered on the east and southeast by the Körfez District, on the west by the Kargalı and Duraklı neighborhoods, and on the northwest and north by the Duraklı neighborhood.

The Ambargölü Deresi Nature Trail begins in Elbizli (ending in Eleşli in Duraklı).
