= Gökçeviran =

Gökçeviran may refer to:

- Gökçeören, Kalecik, Ankara Province, Turkey
- Gökçeören, Osmangazi, Bursa Province, Turkey
- Gökçeören, İzmit, Kocaeli Province, Turkey
