= Rhoe =

Coordinates: 41°10′07″N 30°13′39″E

Rhoe (Ancient Greek: Ῥόη, romanized: Rhoē) was a port town of ancient Bithynia in Asia Minor on the shore of the Pontus Euxinus. It was located 20 stadia east of Calpe, on a steep promontory and contained a road fit only for small vessels. It was inhabited during Roman and Byzantine Empire times.

Its site is located near Kefken in Asiatic Turkey.
