= Desa (Bithynia) =

Town of ancient Bithynia

Coordinates: 41°04′08″N 30°09′56″E

Desa was an inland town of ancient Bithynia inhabited during Roman times. Its name does not occur in ancient authors, but is inferred from epigraphic and other evidence.

Its site is located near Kandıra in Asiatic Turkey.
