= Elaea (Bithynia) =

Town of ancient Bithynia

Coordinates: 40°44′56″N 29°47′09″E

Elaea or Elaia (Ancient Greek: Ελαία) was a town of ancient Bithynia on the coast of the Sinus Astacenus in the Propontis.

Its site is located near Zeytin Burnu (Körfez), in Asiatic Turkey.
