= Deliveli =

Village in Kocaeli Province, Turkey

Coordinates: 40°58′32″N 30°00′05″E

Deliveli is a neighborhood (formerly a village) in Kandıra District, Kocaeli Province, Turkey. Its population is 116 (2025).

== Name ==
Deliveli means literally "crazy guardian" (Turkish: deli + veli). Two different stories are given concerning the origin of the name:

- Long ago, a man named Deli Veli (Veli the Crazy) was a respected elder of the village, and the village was named after him.
- In the past, a wrestler named Veli lived in the area. Because he could defeat everyone, he earned the nickname "Deli" and the village was named after him.

== History ==
A Byzantine-era stone block carved with a cross has been found in Deliveli; it was reused as part of a well.
