= TEV İnanç Türkeş High School for Gifted Students =

Coordinates: 40.782296°N 29.483185°E

- Türk Eğitim Vakfı İnanç Türkeş Özel Lisesi
- No: 25/A, 4126 Street, Muallimköy Mah. Gebze, Kocaeli 41400; Turkey

Information
- Other name: TEVITOL
- Type: Private; Coeducational; Bilingual; Boarding
- Established: 1993; 33 years ago
- Headmaster: Tufan Çapan
- Faculty: 42 (Full-time) & 14 (Part-time)
- Enrollment: 217
- Student to teacher ratio: 4.5:1
- Campus: Suburban (103 acres / 42 ha)
- Colors: Red, Black and Grey
- Mascot: Octopus, Hog (School's American Football Team)
- Nickname: İnanç, TEVİTÖL
- Website: https://www.tevinanc.k12.tr/
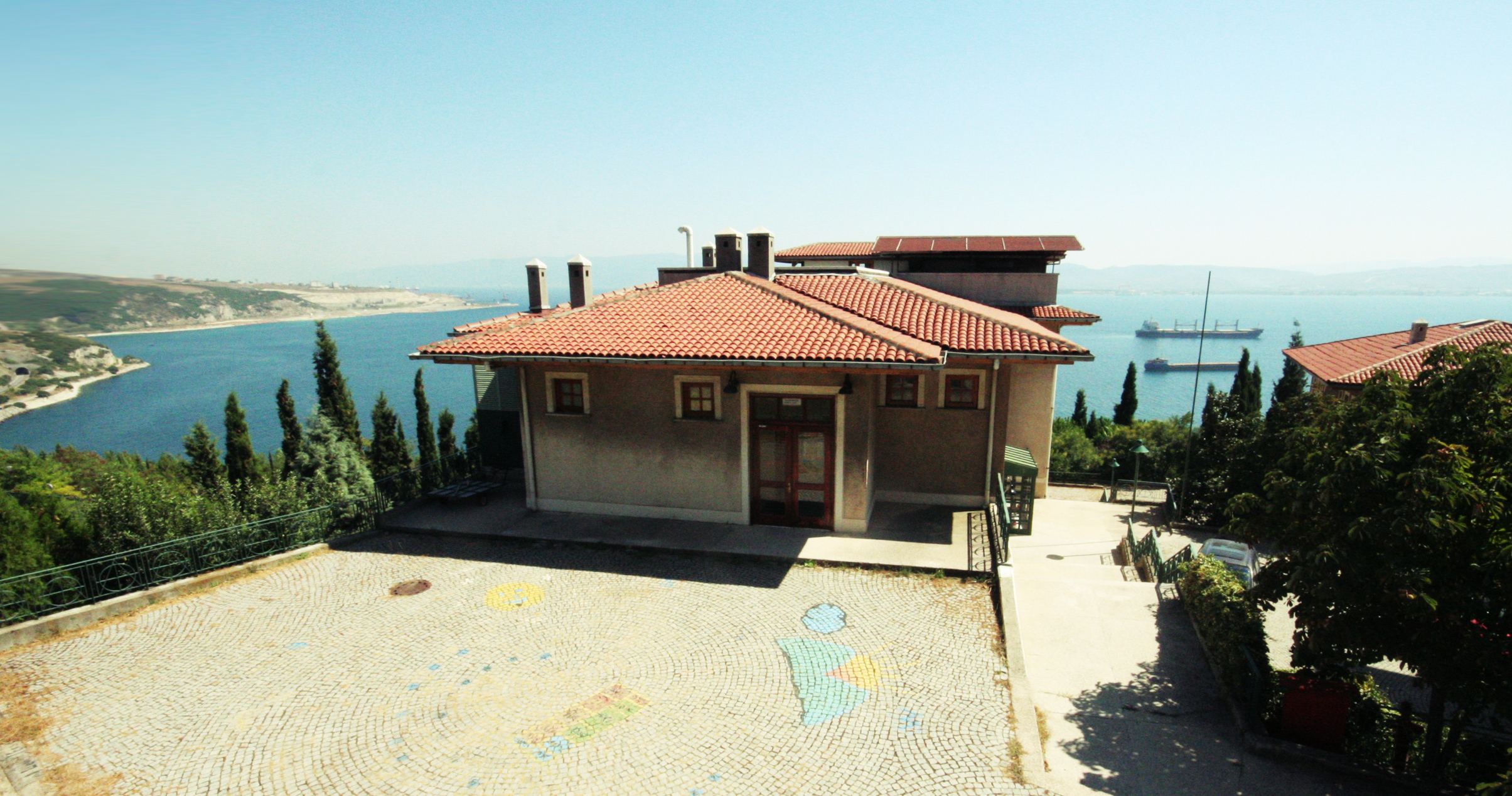
- TEVİTÖL overlooking the Sea of Marmara.

Turkish Education Foundation İnanç Türkeş Private High School (commonly known as TEV İnanç Türkeş High School for Gifted Students or TEVİTÖL; Turkish: TEV İnanç Türkeş Özel Lisesi) is an independent co-educational boarding high school located in Gebze, Kocaeli, Turkey. It operates under the umbrella of the Turkish Education Foundation (Turkish: Türk Eğitim Vakfı, TEV) and accepts gifted and talented students through a tailored student selection process.

TEVİTÖL provides education to high-achieving and high-potential students from across Turkey, aiming to equip them with a modern academic and cultural foundation. The school focuses on identifying each student’s individual characteristics and talents, supporting them in realizing their full potential.

== History ==
In 1990, Turkish businessman Sezai Türkeş established the İnanç Foundation (Turkish: İnanç Vakfı) in memory of his late wife, İnanç Türkeş. The foundation aimed to support the education of underprivileged but gifted students in Turkey. In 1993, the foundation opened the private school Özel İnanç Lisesi with an initial cohort of 30 students. At full capacity, the school was designed to host up to 210 students across seven grades: one preparatory year, three years of middle school, and three years of high school.

In 1995, the school faced financial difficulties and halted the construction of its campus. In 1997, due to national educational reforms, the middle school section was discontinued.

In 2001, the Turkish Education Foundation (TEV) assumed administrative control of the school. In 2002, it was officially renamed TEV İnanç Türkeş Özel Lisesi (TEVİTÖL).

== Education and mission ==
TEVİTÖL is a co-educational boarding school that provides full-time education to students identified as gifted or high-achieving. The school’s mission is to deliver a modern academic and cultural education while nurturing students’ individual characteristics and talents. Its objective is to help students reach their full intellectual, social, and emotional potential.

== Extracurriculars and traditional activities ==
=== Extracurricular activities ===
TEV İnanç High School offers activities to improve students' creativity and social life.All students are encouraged to participate in at least three weekly activities, although many students choose to engage in more. Activities in the school can be student-run, teacher-run or could take place outside the school in cooperation with universities and academic institutions. Popular student-run activities include:

- IMC (Inanc Mechatronics Club)
- A Cappella Group D'Acca
- Abyss Games Studio
- Russian Club
- Design Club
- Drum Club
- Athletics Club
- Debate Club
- Economics Club
- MUN (Model United Nations)
- JA (Junior Achievement)
- Nota Bene the English newspaper
- Ayaküstü the Literary Review
- Green Team
- Comenius
- Philosophy Club
- Puzzle Club
- Mechatronics Club
- Theater Club
- Astronomy Club
- 3D Printing Club

=== Traditional activities ===
- Fairytale Night
- Poetry Night
- Quiz Night
- History Night
- Inter-High Schools Debate Competition
- German Night
- English Night
- Science and Arts Week

== Campus ==
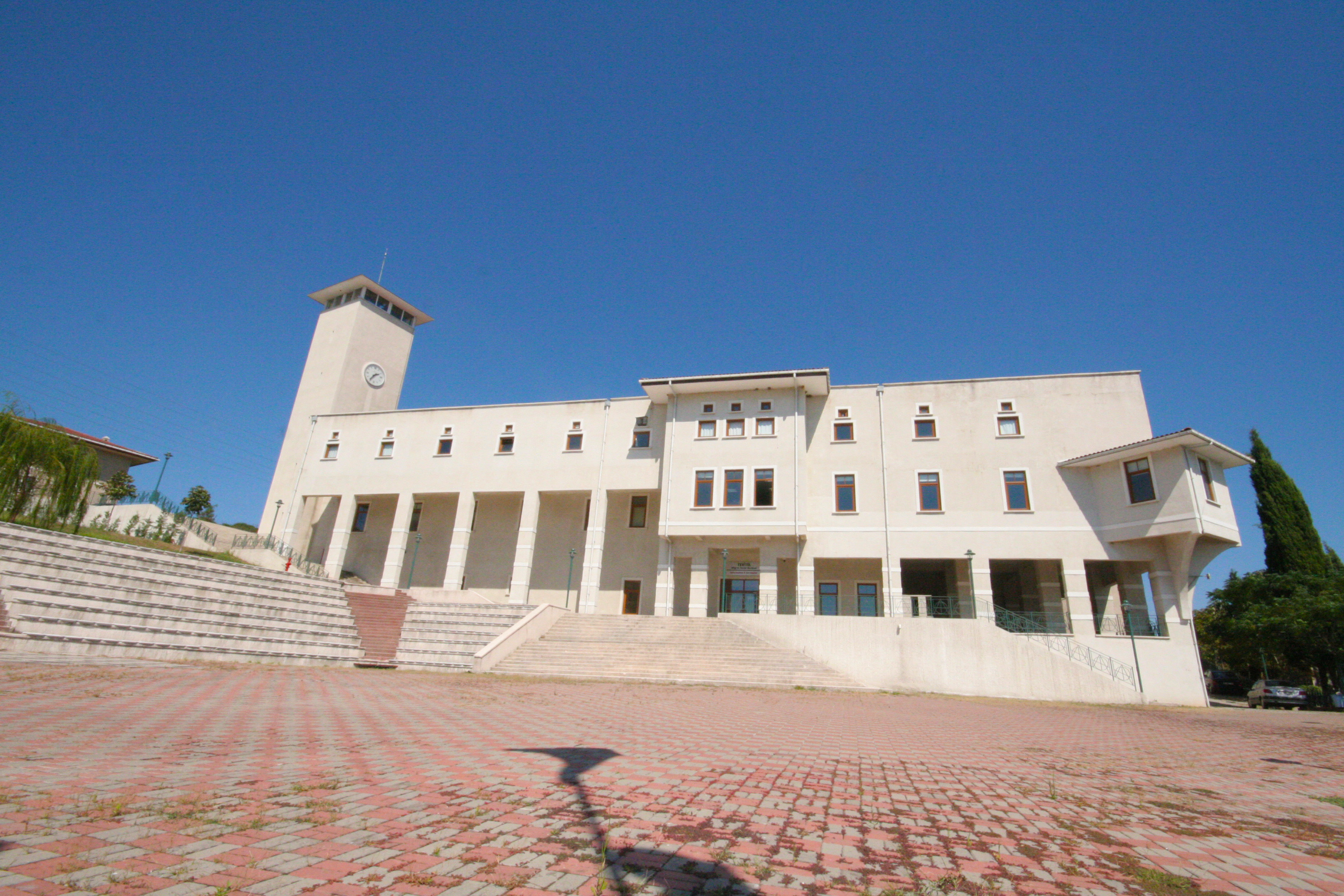
Science and Arts Center at TEV İnanç Türkeş High School

TEV İnanç Türkeş High School is located 7 km southeast of Gebze. The campus consists of 103 acres (420,000 m^{2}) of land and houses administrative offices, staff housing and sports facilities.

On a west-east axis, the school contains student housing, arts center, library, main building with student lounges and dining hall, science center and athletics facilities. To the north of the campus, there is an indoor sports complex.

To the southwest of the main campus, the "Greek Temple," an observation site, is located atop a set of stairs that descend to the Sea of Marmara.

Scientific and Technological Research Council of Turkey is adjacent to the campus to the west.

== College admissions ==
TEVİTÖL has been sending applications to universities both in Turkey and abroad since 2000 with the first graduates of the class. Particularly in its initial years, İnanç High School students were able to study with full scholarship.
