= Kalburcu, Körfez =

Village in Kocaeli Province, Turkey

Kalburcu is a village (officially a neighborhood) in Körfez District, Kocaeli Province, Turkey. Its population is 386 (2025).

== Name ==
Kalburcu means literally "sieve maker, sieve seller" (Turkish: kalbur, "sieve," + -cu, -ci, suffix related to profession, occupation, inclination). Local people report various origins of the name:

- The people of the village were sieve makers.
- During Ottoman times, a pipemaker (borucu) from the army stayed in the village for a while. The villagers did not want him to leave and said, “Stay, pipemaker” (Kal borucu).
- In the past, water was brought to the village via pipes. When a pipemaker planned to take the water to the village of Demirciler instead, the villagers of what is now Kalburcu said, “Stay, pipemaker” (Kal borucu), and the pipemaker kept the water there.

The village name is given as Kalburdjilar on an early 20th-century German map.

== History ==
The village area was settled at least as early as the Roman Antonine era.

The village became part of the Ottoman Empire when captured by İlyas Bey in the early 1300s.

In 1920, during the Turkish War of Independence, Greek forces were stationed in Kalburca.

== Local features ==
A cemetery one kilometer southwest of the village was reported in 1973 to include many Roman funerary altars and reused fragments of columns, bases, capitals, and sarcophagi, in particular an altar dedicated to the god Men Dolanos. It also included many Armenian gravestones.

Two hiking trails begin in Kalburcu:

- Yukarı Hereke (Upper Hereke) - Kalburcu
- Kalburcu - Kayalıtepe
