= Arslanbey, Kartepe =

Arslanbey
- Neighbourhood
- Location within Turkey Location within Marmara
- Coordinates: 40°41′25″N 30°1′39″E
- Country: Turkey
- Province: Kocaeli
- District: Kartepe
- Population (2022): 3,927
- Time zone: UTC+3 (TRT)

Arslanbey or Aslanbey (Armenian: Ասլանբեկ Aslanbek or Aslanbeg) is a neighbourhood of the municipality and district of Kartepe, Kocaeli Province, Turkey. Its population is 3,927 (2022). Before the Armenian genocide it was populated by Armenians and was known as Aslanbeg. The Armenian dialect of Aslanbeg had some unusual features; it was described by Hrachia Adjarian but now is extinct.
