= Şerefsungur =

Village in Kocaeli Province, Turkey

Coordinates: 40°58′16″N 30°01′33″E

Şerefsungur is a neighborhood (formerly a village) in Kandıra District, Kocaeli Province, Turkey. Its population is 261 (2025).

== Name ==
The name of the village means literally "honor falcon" (Turkish: şeref + sungur). In some sources, it is spelled Şeref Sungur.

== History ==
The population of the village was

- 145 in the year 1458, with 29 households
- 174 in 1522–23, with 33 households
- 162 in 1530, with 29 households
- 286 in 1565–66, with 54 households
- 285 in 1590–91, with 52 households

Revenues from the village supported the foundation of Istanbul's Selim I Mosque and Imaret in the 16th century.
