= Kefken Island =

Island in Turkey

Coordinates: 41°12′58″N 30°15′40″E

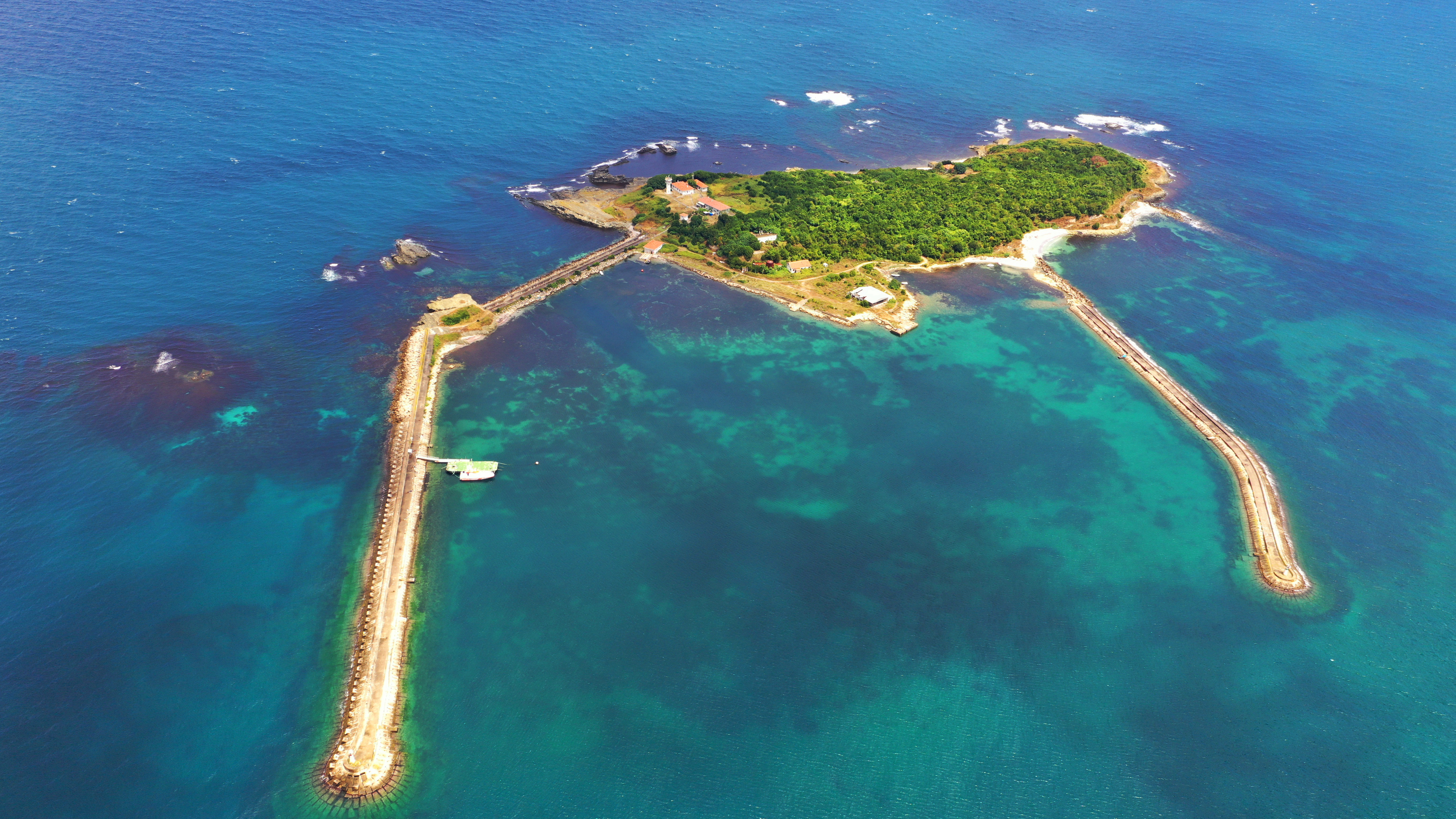

Kefken Island (Turkish: Kefken Adası), lies off the Black Sea coast of Turkey, a short boat ride from the mainland village of Cebeci in the Kandıra district of Kocaeli Province.

It has an area of 21 hectares, and is about four times as long as it is broad.

== History ==
During the Greek, Roman and Byzantine (pre-Turkish) era, the island was called Daphnusia (Δαφνουσία), Apollonia (Ἀπολλωνία), Thynias (Θυνιάς), Thyni (Θυνή), Thynis (Θυνίς) and Thyniis (Θυνηίς). The last of these names is derived from ancient Greek Thynos (Θύνος) 'tuna fish', and perhaps from the Thynii, a tribe of Thracian origin that lived in coastal Bithynia. It is mentioned by the geographer Ptolemy (5.14.1) and Pliny the Elder (5.32), and by Strabo, and also in the Periplus of the Euxine Sea. The names Thynias and Daphnusia are both given by Ptolemy, Thynias by Pliny, Strabo and Stephanus of Byzantium. Stephanus of Byzantium writes that it is also called Thyni, Thynis and Thyniis.

The island is also mentioned at the Greek epic poems Argonautica and Argonautica Orphica. Both poems are about the Argonauts.

Although the settlement on the island never attained city status, it was eventually raised to a bishopric, likely at a relatively late stage, since it is not mentioned in the Synecdemus. The first of the Notitiae Episcopatuum in which it appears, always under the name "Daphnusia", is the early 10th-century one attributed to Byzantine Emperor Leo VI the Wise. The Greek Orthodox Church venerates as a martyr bishop of Daphnusia a certain Sabas, of whom nothing else is known, while extant documents show that Leo took part in the Council of Constantinople (869), where he expressed repentance for having deserted Ignatius of Constantinople in favour of Photius, and that his successor Antonius was at the Council of Constantinople (879), which reinstated Photius. No longer a residential bishopric, Daphnusia is today listed by the Catholic Church as a titular see.

In 1261 the Latin fleet was engaged in the siege of the island when the Greek Emperor of Nicaea, Michael VIII Palaeologus, captured Constantinople and thus put an end to the Latin Empire.

In 1915, there was a naval battle nearby between the Russians and Ottomans which ended in a Russian victory.

== Present features ==
Long breakwaters extend out from the island, forming a safe harbour for ships.

A lighthouse dating from 1 January 1879 has a range of 14 nautical miles, and there is a smaller lighthouse on each of the two breakwaters.

Walls of a fortress of the Hellenistic and Genoese periods can be seen and some wells and rain-water cisterns.
