= Kabaağaç, Kandıra =

Kabaağaç
- Neighbourhood
- Location in Turkey Kabaağaç (Marmara)
- Coordinates: 41°3′18″N 30°5′45.6″E
- Country: Turkey
- Province: Kocaeli
- District: Kandıra
- Population (2018): 193
- Time zone: UTC+3 (TRT)

Kabaağaç is a neighbourhood of the municipality and district of Kandıra, Kocaeli Province, Turkey. Its population is 193 (2018).

Because of the Russian-Ottoman War of 1877–1878, 45 households from villages in İnce Balkan in Bulgaria were settled in Kabaağaç. In the early 20th century, refugees from Bulgaria also settled in Kabaağaç.
