= Balaban, Kartepe =

Balaban
- Neighbourhood
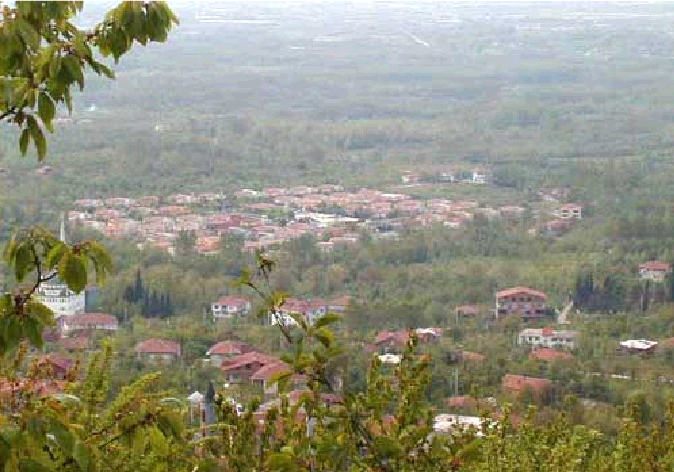
- View of Balaban from the hills surrounding the village

- Location within Turkey Location within Marmara
- Coordinates: 40°41′38″N 30°05′17″E
- Country: Turkey
- Province: Kocaeli
- District: Kartepe
- Area: 5 km^{2} (1.9 sq mi)
- Elevation: 100 m (330 ft)
- Population (2022): 1,326
  - Density: 270/km^{2} (690/sq mi)
- Time zone: UTC+3 (TRT)
- Postal code: 41080
- Area code: 0262

Balaban is a neighbourhood of the municipality and district of Kartepe, Kocaeli Province, Turkey. Its population is 1,326 (2022).

== Geography ==
Balaban is located in the Samanlı Mountain range, on the slopes of Kartepe mountain. It is at the south side of the city of İzmit, Kocaeli Province, on the hillside of Kartepe Mountain between Büyük Derbent and Suadiye towns. It is 24 km from the center of city and 2.5 km from the nearest town, Büyük Derbent.

== History ==
The first settlements date back to ancient times. There are only some materials founded on the village area from Astakos from 712 BCE and also as the inhabitants called as Subaşı area, there are some tunnels and cisterns founded supposedly belonged to Byzantine Empire periods.

Also on the farm place at east side of village, as inhabitants call Taşlı Tarla (en: stony field) there are many materials founded like a piece of valve, keramik pots etc. As a folk story, they belong to "missing mountain" where was overthrown at the big earthquake which happens every 100 years around İzmit on a civilization living there. But its origins are still unknown and there is no academic research about them yet.

Very well known story of Balaban began at the first quarter of the 19th century. Balaban's area known as "Balaban's ranch" where was about 5000 m^{2} (1000 m^{2}=1/4 acre). At that time a Muslim judge Fevzi Efendi bought these all ranch, and brought his family living in Batum in the Russo-Turkish War (1877–1878). With this big migration until 1880, they began to settle down around the area and they created today's Balaban Village.

== Economy ==
The hills and lower sides of Kartepe mountain (1606 m) is very well formed for farming. Inhabitants mostly growing-selling fruits or living there as summer place. "Balaban's Cherry" is very famous, there are many cheery trees in all gardens, but also apple, pear, chestnut, walnut trees are growing too. Stockbreeding is very low, growing vegetables are just for themselves.
