= Güzeller, Gebze =

Güzeller
- Neighbourhood
- Location in Turkey Güzeller (Marmara)
- Coordinates: 40°48′33.8″N 29°26′8.27″E
- Country: Turkey
- Province: Kocaeli
- District: Gebze
- Time zone: UTC+3 (TRT)

Güzeller is a neighbourhood of the municipality and district of Gebze, Kocaeli Province, Turkey.
