= Diliskelesi =

Turkish port

- Neighbourhood
- Location in Turkey Diliskelesi (Marmara)
- Coordinates: 40°46′35″N 29°31′25″E
- Country: Turkey
- Province: Kocaeli
- District: Dilovası
- Population (2022): 10,910
- Time zone: UTC+3 (TRT)

Diliskelesi is a neighbourhood of the municipality and district of Dilovası, Kocaeli Province, Turkey. Its population is 10,910 (2022). It is a port on the north side of the Gulf of İzmit.
