= Maşukiye =

- Neighbourhood
- Location within Turkey Location within Marmara
- Coordinates: 40°42′1″N 30°8′13″E
- Country: Turkey
- Province: Kocaeli
- District: Kartepe
- Time zone: UTC+3 (TRT)

Maşukiye is a neighbourhood of the municipality and district of Kartepe, Kocaeli Province, Turkey.
