= Körfez =

- District and municipality
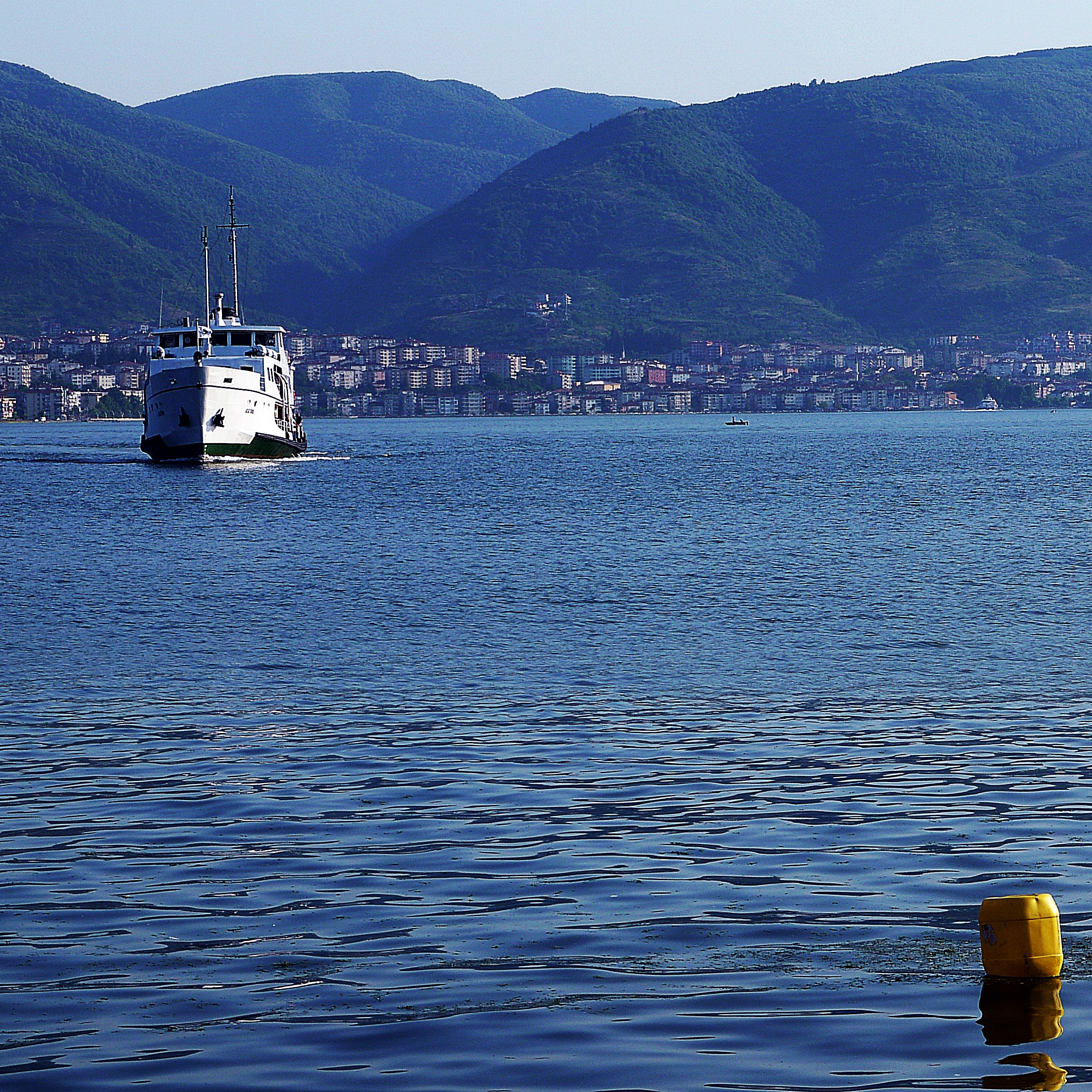
- A ship with Körfez in the background

- Logo

- Map showing Körfez District in Kocaeli Province

- Location within Turkey Location within Marmara
- Coordinates: 40°47′N 29°44′E
- Country: Turkey
- Province: Kocaeli

Government
  - Mayor: Şener Söğüt (AKP)
- Area: 301 km^{2} (116 sq mi)
- Population (2022): 178,048
  - Density: 592/km^{2} (1,530/sq mi)
- Time zone: UTC+3 (TRT)
- Area code: 0262
- Website: www.korfez.bel.tr

Körfez, formerly known as Elaia, or Elaea, is a municipality and district of Kocaeli Province, Turkey. Its area is 301 km^{2}, and its population is 178,048 (2022).

The mayor is Şener Söğüt (AKP) and the district governor is Uğur Kalkar, appointed in August 2022. The cement plant is a major source of greenhouse gas.

== History ==
Kaiser II. Wilhelm Mansion is located in the district. It was built in 1898 for the German Emperor Wilhelm's visit to the Ottoman Empire.

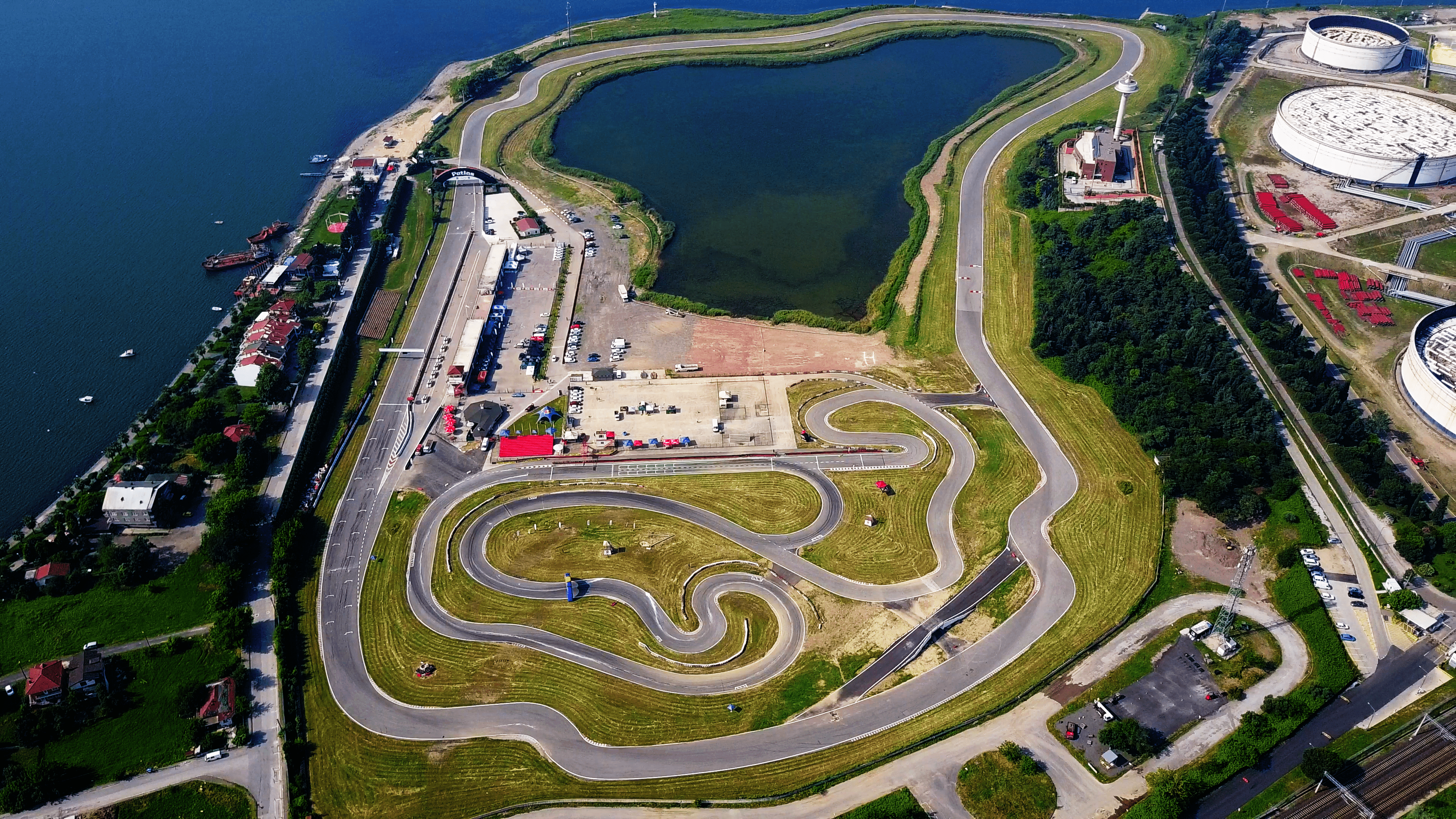
Körfez Race Track

The district Körfez was established in 1987 from parts of the central district of Kocaeli (now İzmit) and of the district of Gebze. At the same time, the municipality Yarımca was renamed to Körfez. It has borders with Şile to north, Derince from east, Dilovası from southwest and Gebze from west. Hereke and Kirazlıyalı were independent towns within the district until they were absorbed into the municipality Körfez in 2008.

== Composition ==
There are 36 neighbourhoods in Körfez District:

- 17 Ağustos
- Agah Ateş
- Alihocalar
- Atalar
- Barbaros
- Belen
- Çamlıtepe
- Çıraklı
- Cumaköy
- Cumhuriyet
- Dereköy
- Dikenli
- Elmacık
- Esentepe
- Fatih
- Güney
- Hacı Akif
- Hacı Osman
- Himmetli
- İlimtepe
- Kalburcu
- Karayakuplu
- Kirazlıyalı
- Kışladüzü
- Kutluca
- Kuzey
- Mimar Sinan
- Naipköy
- Osmanlı
- Şemsettin
- Sevindikli
- Sipahiler
- Şirinyalı
- Yavuz Sultan Selim
- Yeni Yalı
- Yukarı Hereke

== See also ==
- İzmit Körfez Circuit
