= Kartepe =

Kartepe Köseköy
- District and municipality
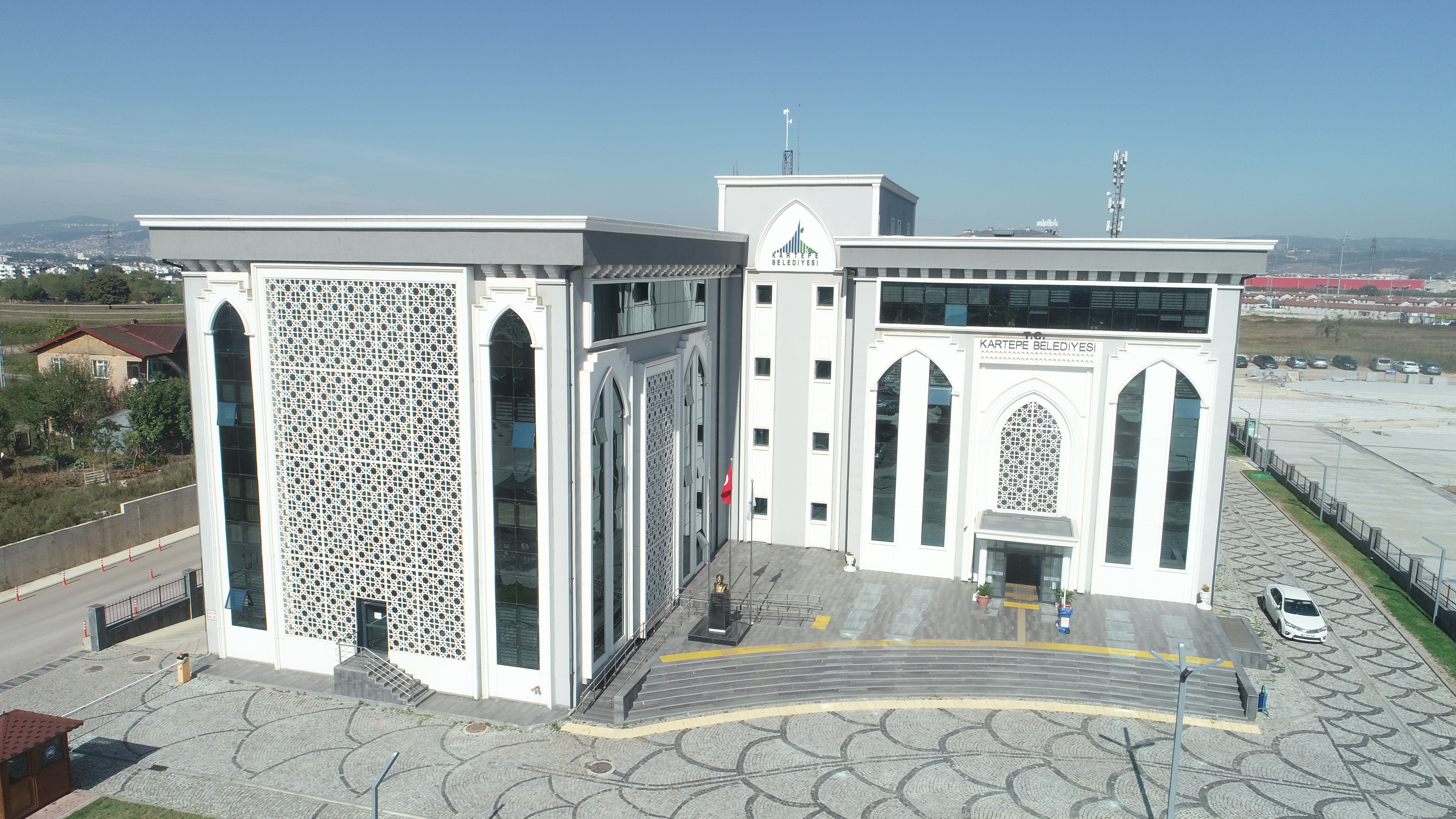
- Kartepe Municipality building

- Map showing Kartepe District in Kocaeli Province

- Location within Turkey Location within Marmara
- Coordinates: 40°44′N 29°58′E
- Country: Turkey
- Province: Kocaeli

Government
  - Mayor: Mustafa Kocaman (AKP)
- Area: 301 km^{2} (116 sq mi)
- Elevation: 10 m (33 ft)
- Population (2022): 136,625
  - Density: 454/km^{2} (1,180/sq mi)
- Time zone: UTC+3 (TRT)
- Area code: 0262
- Website: www.kartepe.bel.tr

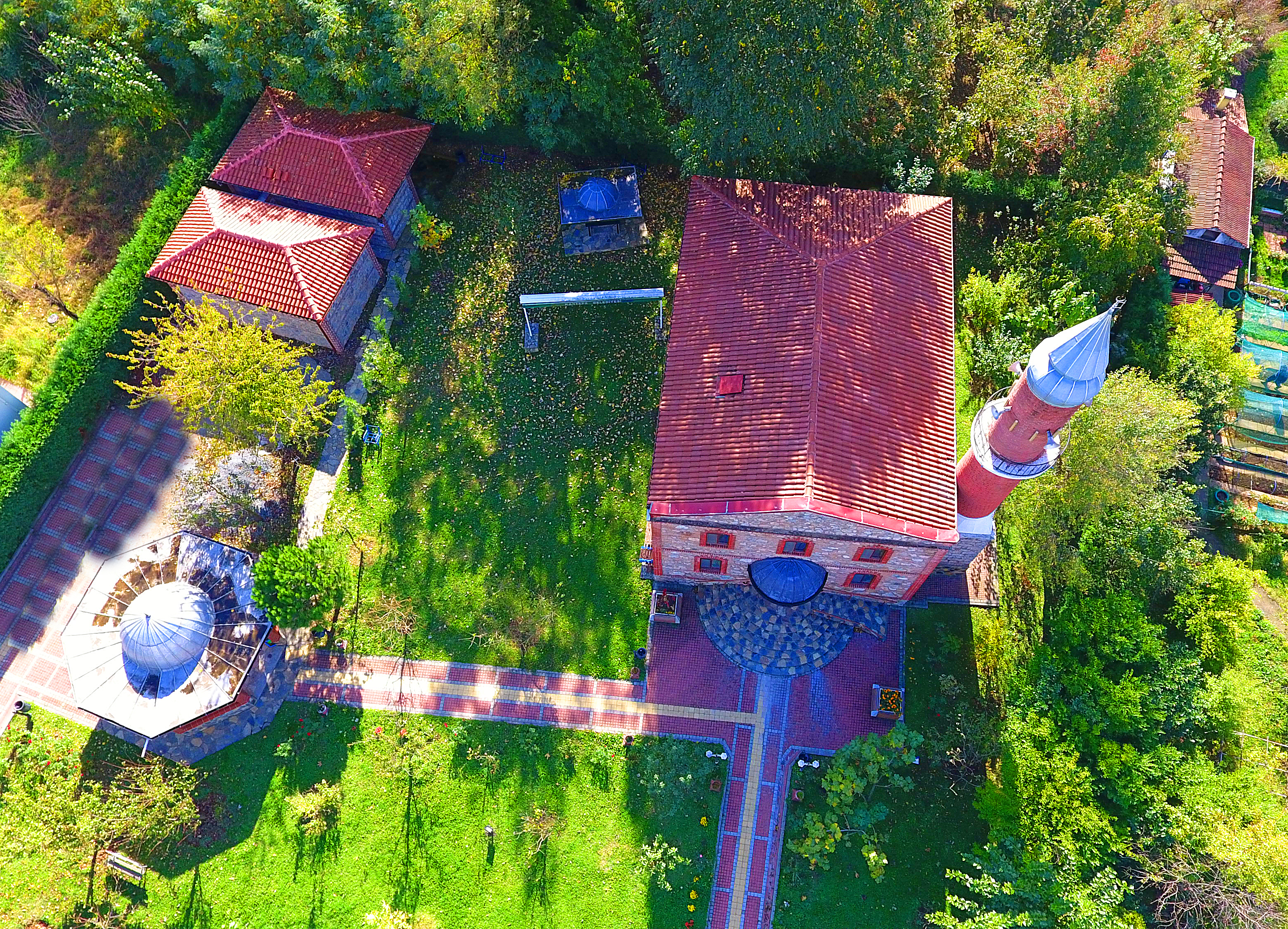
Kartepe Historical Wisdom Mosque

Kartepe is a municipality and district of Kocaeli Province, Turkey. Its area is 301 km^{2}, and its population is 136,625 (2022). The mayor is Mustafa Kocaman (AKP).

== Geography ==
Kartepe (literally Snowy hill referring to mountains to the south) is situated at 40°44′N 29°58′E to the east of the Gulf of İzmit. It is almost merged to İzmit, the province center and it included in Greater Kocaeli (see Metropolitan centers in Turkey). Kartepe Mountains are to the south and Lake Sapanca is to the east of Kartepe.

== Composition ==
There are 38 neighbourhoods in Kartepe District:

- Acısu
- Arslanbey
- Ataevler
- Ataşehir
- Avluburun
- Bakırlı
- Balaban
- Çepni
- Derbent
- Dumlupınar
- Emekevler
- Ertuğrul Gazi
- Eşme
- Eşmeahmediye
- Fatih Sultan Mehmet
- İbrikdere
- İstasyon
- Karatepe
- Kartepe
- Kazakburun
- Kestanelik
- Ketenciler
- Köseköy
- Maşukiye
- Nusretiye
- Pazarçayırı
- Rahmiye
- Sarımeşe
- Sarımeşe Hürriyet
- Serinlik
- Şevkatiye
- Şirinsulhiye
- Suadiye
- Sultaniye
- Uzunbey
- Uzunçiftlik
- Uzuntarla
- Yeşiltepe

== History ==
Kartepe, then known as Köseköy, was founded in 1600s. After the Population exchange between Greece and Turkey agreement, Turks from Greece were settled in Köseköy in 1920s. Later people from Black Sea coast were also settled around Köseköy. Being a part of industrial area the population increased and in 1970 it was declared a seat of township. In 2008 it was merged to nearby towns, renamed as Kartepe and became a district center of Kocaeli Province. The municipality of Kartepe is now an intracity municipality of Greater Kocaeli.

Cengiz Topel Naval Air Station is located in the district.

== Economy ==
Industrial estates around Kartepe constitute the major revenue of the city. Another important sector is mountain tourism. Although Kartepe is founded in the low plains the mountains at the south serve as winter sports complex for nearby Istanbul citizens.
