= Kirazpınar, Gebze =

Neighborhood in the district of Gebze, Turkey

Kirazpınar
- Neighbourhood
- Country: Turkey
- Province: Kocaeli
- District: Gebze
- Time zone: UTC+3 (TRT)

Kirazpınar is a neighborhood (mahalle) in the district of Gebze, in the province of Kocaeli, Turkey. Its population is 12,363 (2021).

Kirazpınar is bordered on the east by the Gebze neighborhood of Tavşanlı, on the south by the E80 Highway (the Trans-European Motorway) with the Gebze neighborhoods of Sultan Orhan and Arapçeşme on the other side of the highway, and on the northwest by the Gebze Güzeller Industrial Park (Organize Sanayi Bölgesi) and the Gebze neighborhood of Pelitli. Much of the southeast of the neighborhood is taken up by quarries (Gebze Taş Ocakları).

The area was first settled as a gecekondu neighborhood, but was made an official neighborhood after 2004. The area hosts a large number of automotive firms.
