= Kefken =

- Neighbourhood
- Location within Turkey Location within Marmara
- Coordinates: 41°10′12″N 30°13′41″E
- Country: Turkey
- Province: Kocaeli
- District: Kandıra
- Time zone: UTC+3 (TRT)

Kefken is a neighbourhood of the municipality and district of Kandıra, Kocaeli Province, Turkey.
