= Dilovası =

- District and municipality
- Logo

- Map showing Dilovası District in Kocaeli Province

- Location within Turkey Location within Marmara
- Coordinates: 40°46′47″N 29°32′06″E
- Country: Turkey
- Province: Kocaeli

Government
  - Mayor: Hamza Şayir (AKP)
- Area: 125 km^{2} (48 sq mi)
- Population (2022): 53,416
  - Density: 427/km^{2} (1,110/sq mi)
- Time zone: UTC+3 (TRT)
- Postal code: 41455
- Area code: 0262
- Website: www.dilovasi.bel.tr

Dilovası is a municipality and district of Kocaeli Province, Turkey. Its area is 125 km^{2}, and its population is 53,416 (2022). The district Dilovası was created in 2008 from part of the district of Gebze, along with the districts Darıca and Çayırova. The mayor is Hamza Şayir (AKP).

== Composition ==
There are 12 neighbourhoods in Dilovası District:

- Çerkeşli
- Cumhuriyet
- Demirciler
- Diliskelesi
- Fatih
- Kayapınar
- Köseler
- Mimar Sinan
- Orhangazi
- Tavşancıl
- Tepecik
- Turgut Özal
