= Demirciler, Dilovası =

Demirciler
- Neighbourhood
- Location in Turkey Demirciler (Marmara)
- Coordinates: 40°50′49.2″N 29°33′18″E
- Country: Turkey
- Province: Kocaeli
- District: Dilovası
- Time zone: UTC+3 (TRT)

Demirciler is a neighbourhood of the municipality and district of Dilovası, Kocaeli Province, Turkey.
