= Gökçeören, İzmit =

Gökçeören
- Neighbourhood
- Location in Turkey Gökçeören (Marmara)
- Coordinates: 40°51′N 30°01′E
- Country: Turkey
- Province: Kocaeli
- District: İzmit
- Population (2022): 455
- Time zone: UTC+3 (TRT)

Gökçeören (also Gökçeviran) is a neighbourhood of the municipality and district of İzmit, Kocaeli Province, Turkey. Its population is 455 (2022).
