= Kandıra =

- District and municipality
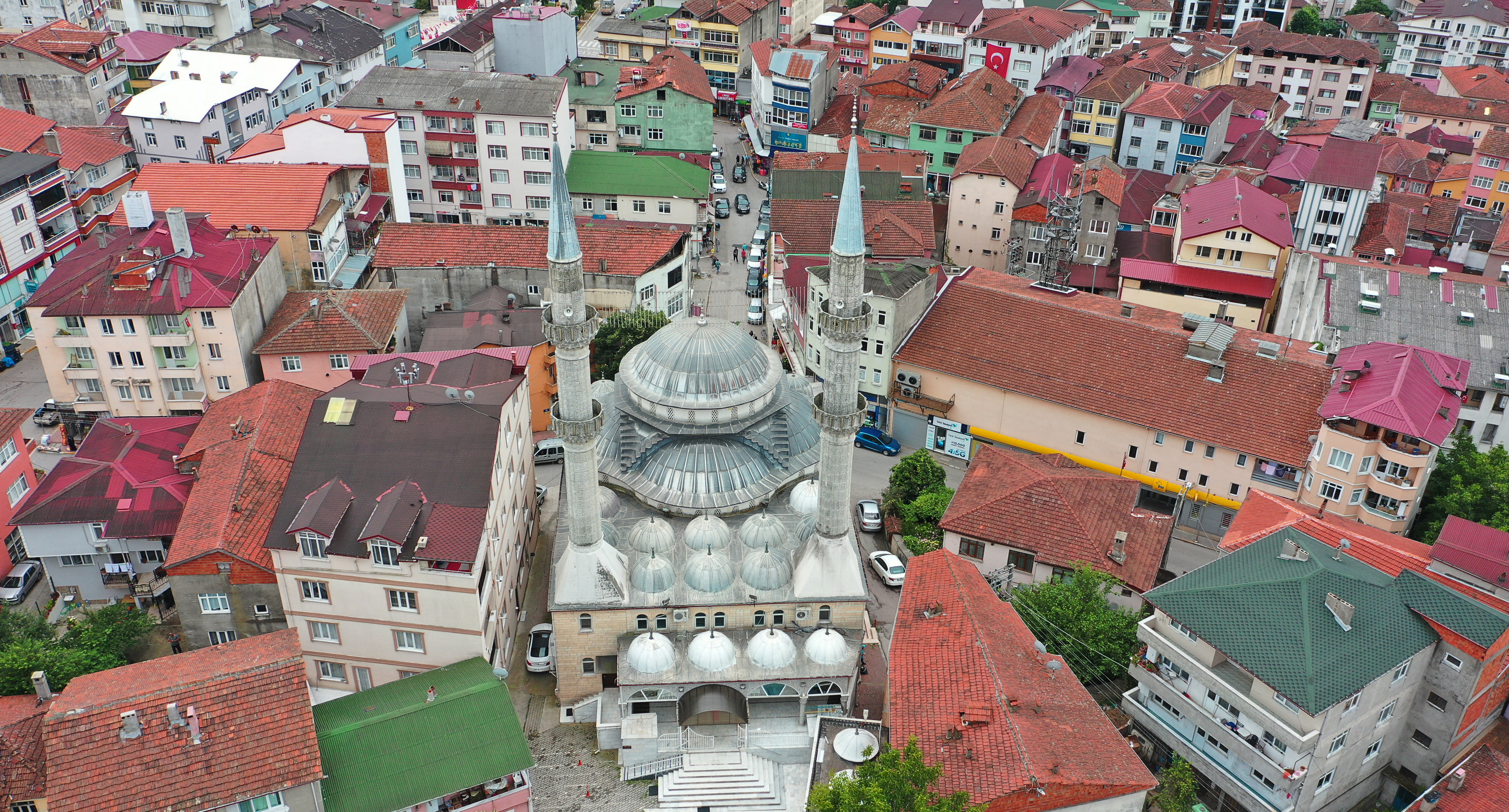
- Kandıra Şefik Mosque

- Map showing Kandıra District in Kocaeli Province

- Location within Turkey Location within Marmara
- Coordinates: 41°04′20″N 30°09′40″E
- Country: Turkey
- Province: Kocaeli

Government
  - Mayor: Erol Ölmez (AKP)
- Area: 840 km^{2} (320 sq mi)
- Population (2022): 52,874
  - Density: 63/km^{2} (160/sq mi)
- Time zone: UTC+3 (TRT)
- Area code: 0262
- Website: www.kandira.bel.tr

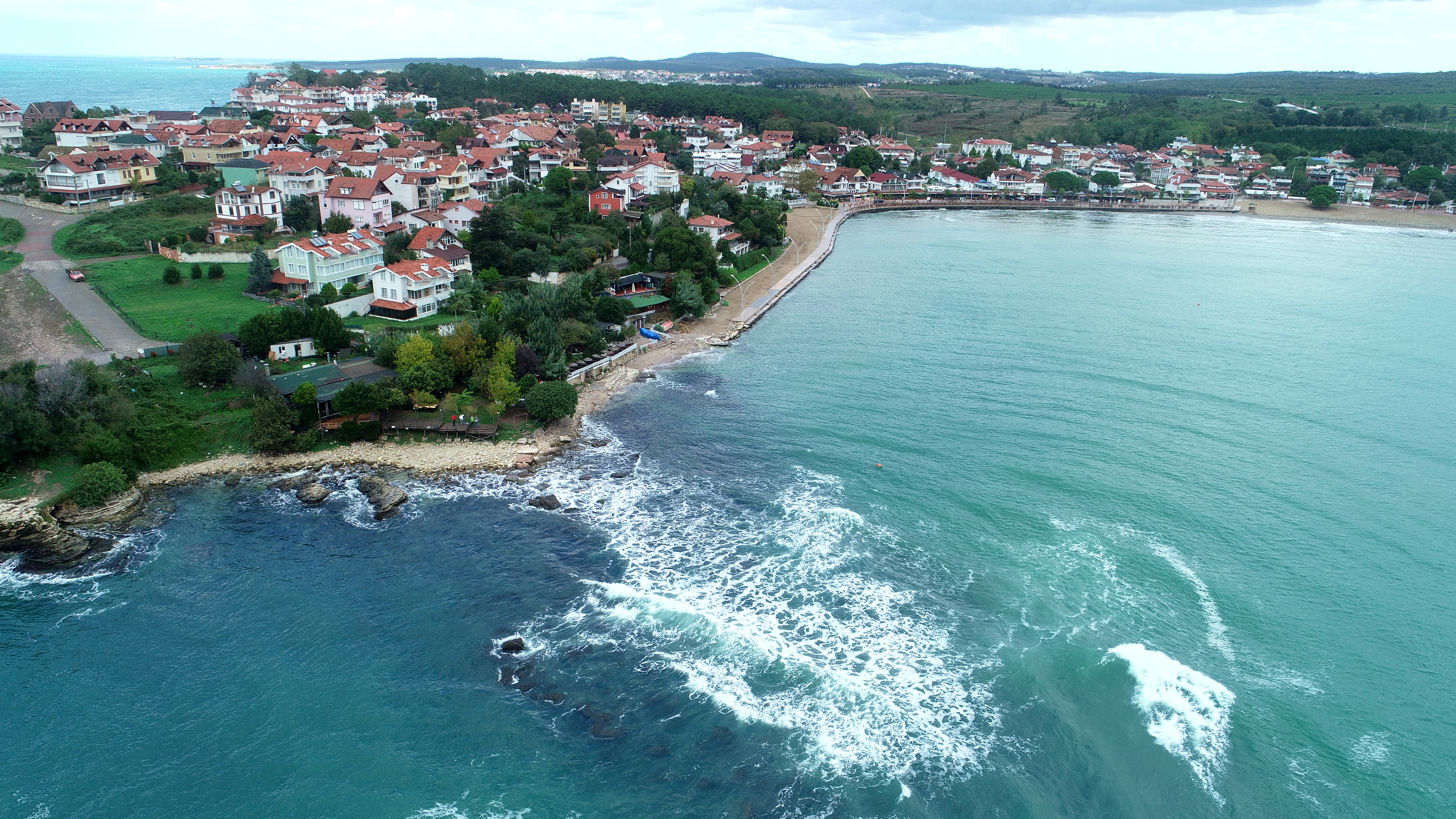
Kerpe beach

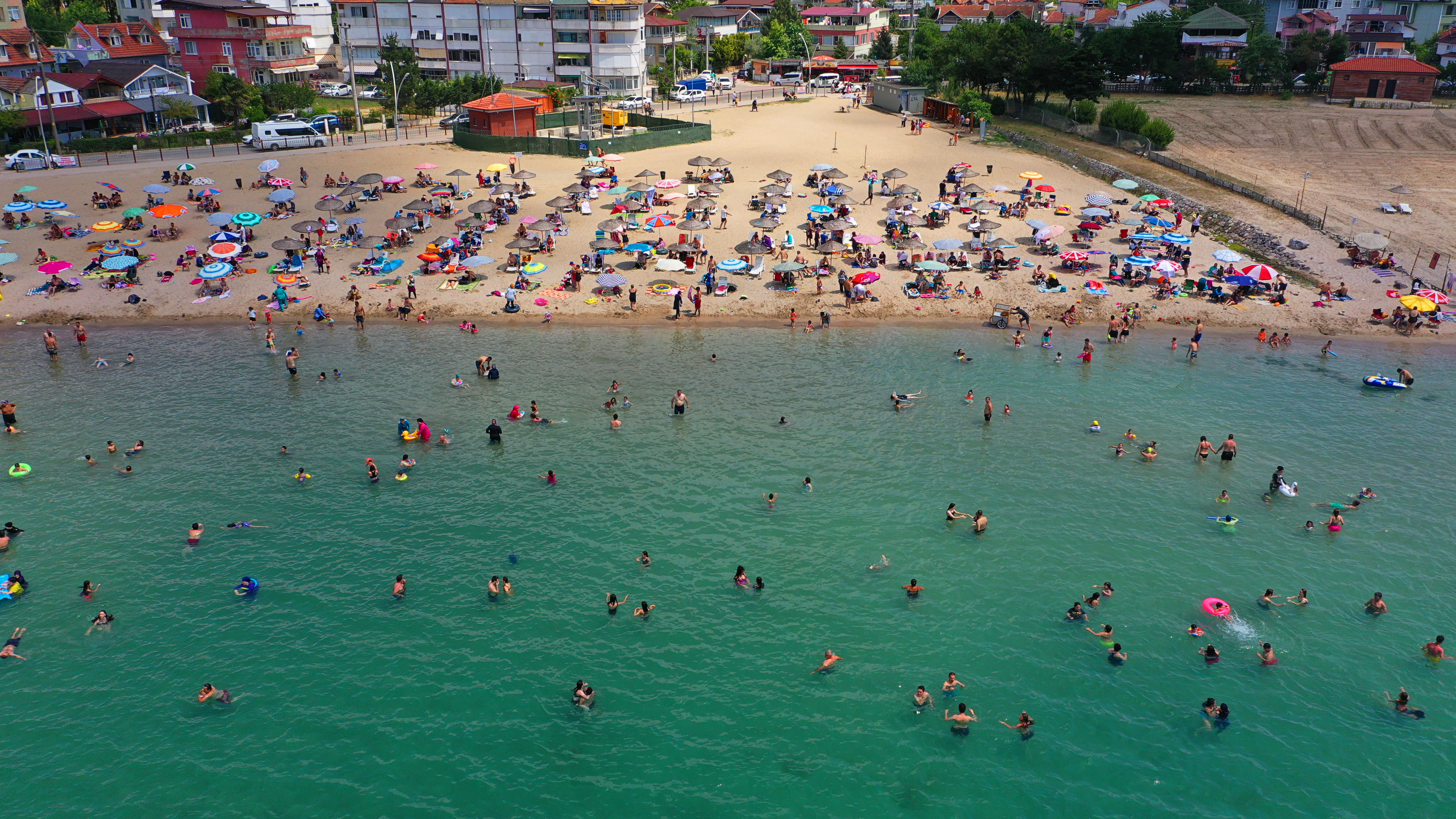
A beach in Cebeci village, Kefken, Kandıra.

Kandıra is a municipality and district of Kocaeli Province, Turkey. Its area is 840 km^{2}, and its population is 52,874 (2022). Its neighbours are Kaynarca to the east, Adapazarı to the southeast, İzmit to the south and Şile to the west.

== Geography ==
Of the area of Kandıra, almost 50% is used for agricultural purposes, while almost 40% is forested. Of the rest of the land, 4% is settled (buildings or roads and the remainder)

== History ==
Kandıra is first mentioned as Desa(nôn Kômê). The state hospital of Kandıra was founded in 1949.

== Tourist attractions ==
Tourists discovered Kerpe when it was a small fishing port. It boasts a calm sea and sandy beaches, and is close to urban centers such as Istanbul, İzmit, and Adapazarı.

Kefken is 20 km away from Kandıra, and 8 km away from Kerpe. Kefken is the most advanced town among the coastal settlements of the district. Sea, beach and pine forests are the most important features. Kefken harbor is a typical fishing town. In the summertime the town gets 3 times crowded. 2 hours more or less, or 150 km away from Istanbul on the Black Sea coast, is this fairly secluded, quiet, and relatively unspoilt part of the region. The sea is suitable for swimming and there are unspoilt bays for picnics. Kefken Island is one of the few islands on the Turkish Black Sea coast. The island is at a close distance to the shores of Cebeci village. Genoese era fortress walls and water wells are worth to mention as the historical heritage of the island.

== Composition ==
There are 96 neighbourhoods in Kandıra District:

- Ağaçağıl
- Ahmethacılar
- Akbal
- Akçabeyli
- Akçakese
- Akçaova
- Akdurak
- Akıncı
- Alaybey
- Alefli
- Antaplı
- Avdan
- Aydınlık
- Babaköy
- Babalı
- Bağırganlı
- Balaban
- Balcı
- Ballar
- Beyce
- Beylerbeyi
- Bolu
- Bozburun
- Çakırcaali
- Çakmaklar
- Çalca
- Çalköy
- Çalyer
- Çamkonak
- Çarşı
- Cebeci
- Çerçili
- Dalca
- Deliveli
- Doğancılı
- Döngelli
- Duraklı
- Eğercili
- Elmacık
- Esentepe
- Ferizli
- Gebeşler
- Goncaaydın
- Hacılar
- Hacımazlı
- Hacışeyh
- Hediyeli
- Hıdırlar
- Hüdaverdiler
- İncecik
- Kabaağaç
- Kanatlar
- Karaağaç
- Karadivan
- Karlı
- Kaymas
- Kaymaz Erikli
- Kefken
- Kerpe
- Kırkarmut
- Kızılcapınar
- Kocakaymas
- Kubuzcu
- Kurtyeri
- Lokmanlı
- Mancarlar
- Merkez Erikli
- Mülküşehsuvar
- Nasuhlar
- Ömerli
- Orhan
- Özbey
- Pelitpınarı
- Pınardüzü
- Pınarlı
- Pirceler
- Safalı
- Sarıahmetler
- Sarıcaali
- Sarıgazi
- Sarnıçlar
- Selametli
- Selimköy
- Sepetçi
- Şerefsungur
- Seyitaliler
- Sinanlıbilalli
- Sucuali
- Süllü
- Tatarahmet
- Teksen
- Terziler
- Topluca
- Üğümce
- Yağcılar
- Yusufca
