= Gebze =

- District and municipality
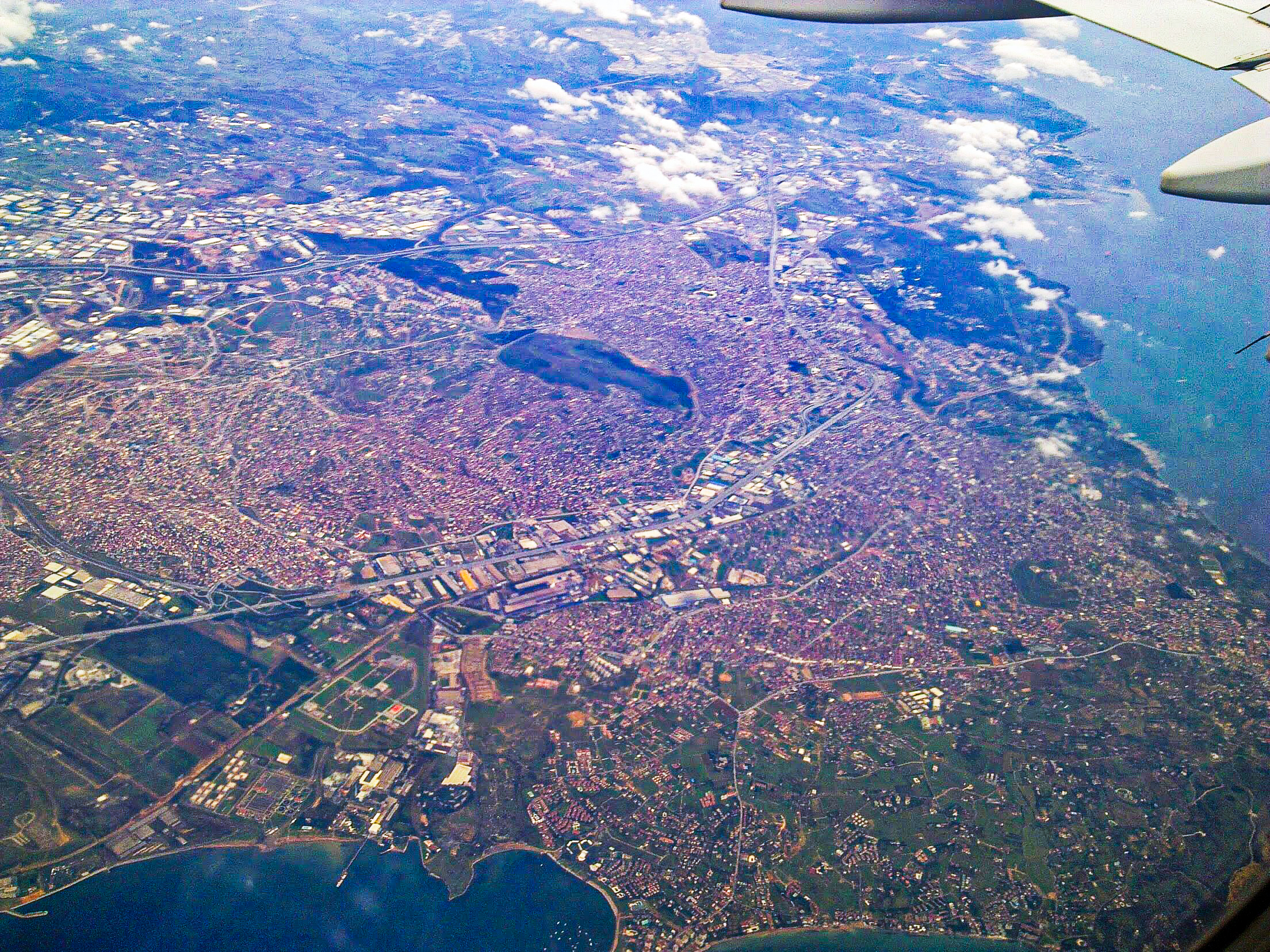
- Gebze from above

- Logo

- Map showing Gebze District in Kocaeli Province

- Location within Turkey Location within Marmara
- Coordinates: 40°48′N 29°26′E
- Country: Turkey
- Province: Kocaeli

Government
  - Mayor: Zinnur Büyükgöz (AKP)
- Area: 418 km^{2} (161 sq mi)
- Population (2022): 407,019
  - Density: 974/km^{2} (2,520/sq mi)
- Time zone: UTC+3 (TRT)
- Postal code: 41400
- Area code: 0262
- Website: www.gebze.bel.tr

Gebze (Turkish pronunciation: [ˈɟebze]), formerly known as Libyssa, Λίβυσσα (in Ancient Greek), is a working-class district and one of the municipalities in Kocaeli Province, Turkey. Its area is 418 km^{2}, and its population is 407,019 (2022). It is situated 65 km (30 mi) southeast of Istanbul, on the Gulf of Izmit, the eastern arm of the Sea of Marmara. Gebze is the largest district by population size in the province as of 2022, exceeding İzmit, the provincial capital. Its population consists of a colossal working class, one of the largest in Turkey, as it hosts 10 industrial parks, which contain 1,384 companies and employ over 130,000 people.

== Geography ==
The district of Gebze is located in the western portion of Kocaeli Province; with neighbors Körfez to the east; Pendik, Tuzla and Şile in Istanbul to the northwest, west and north respectively; Çayırova and Darıca to the southwest and Dilovası to the southeast.

== Composition ==
There are 40 neighbourhoods in Gebze District:

- Adem Yavuz
- Ahatlı
- Arapçeşme
- Balçık
- Barış
- Beylikbağı
- Cumaköy
- Cumhuriyet
- Denizli
- Duraklı
- Elbizli
- Eskihisar
- Gaziler
- Güzeller
- Hacı Halil
- Hatipler
- Hürriyet
- İnönü
- İstasyon
- Kadıllı
- Kargalı
- Kirazpınar
- Köşklüçeşme
- Mevlana
- Mimar Sinan
- Mollafenari
- Muallimköy
- Mudarlı
- Mustafapaşa
- Osman Yılmaz
- Ovacık
- Pelitli
- Sultan Orhan
- Tatlıkuyu
- Tavşanlı
- Tepemanayır
- Ulus
- Yağcılar
- Yavuzselim
- Yenikent

== Transport ==
The northern terminus of Osman Gazi Bridge falls within this area; the construction — having a total length of 4 kilometers (with a 1,550-meter main span) — bridges the Sea of Marmara from Kababurun to Dilburnu. The Gebze Metro began construction in 2018 for a 2026 opening. The Marmaray intercontinental commuter rail line connects Gebze to the European side of Istanbul.

== Twin towns – sister cities ==
Gebze is twinned with:

- Garoowe, Somalia
- Kakanj, Bosnia and Herzegovina
- Karakol, Kyrgyzstan
- Kiseljak, Bosnia and Herzegovina
- Kythrea, Cyprus
- Oeiras, Portugal
- Pylaia, Greece
- Samuil, Bulgaria
- Studeničani, North Macedonia
- Tyulyachinsky District, Russia

== Gallery ==
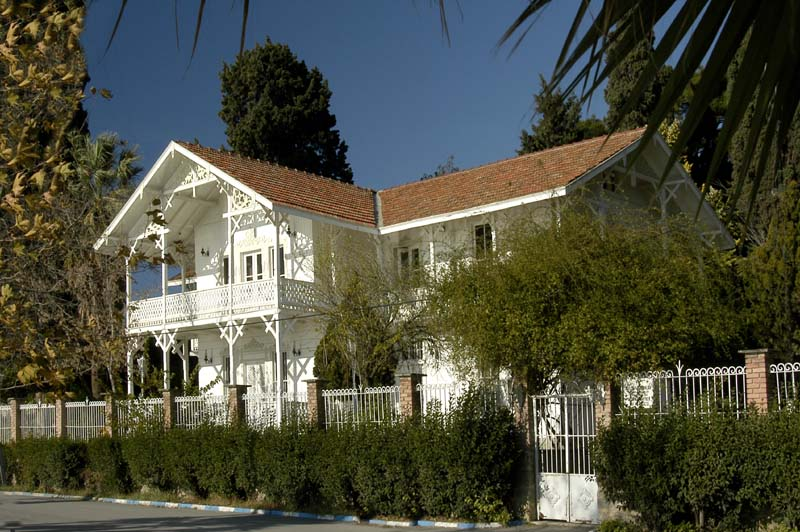
Osman Hamdi Bey Museum

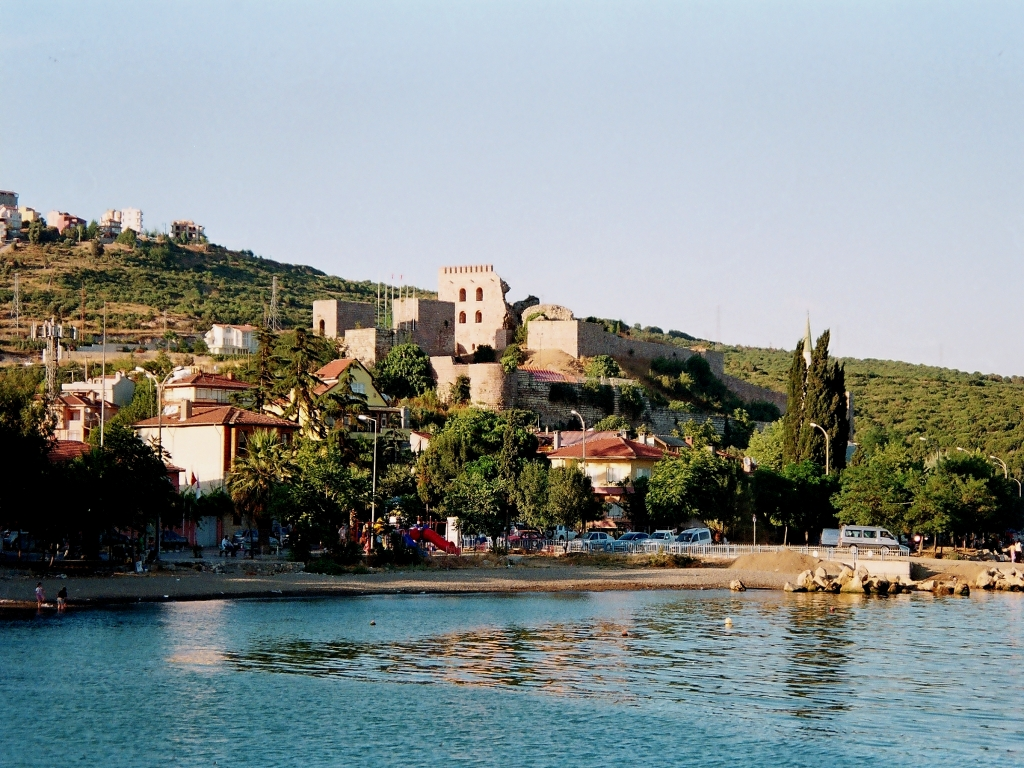
Eskihisar Castle

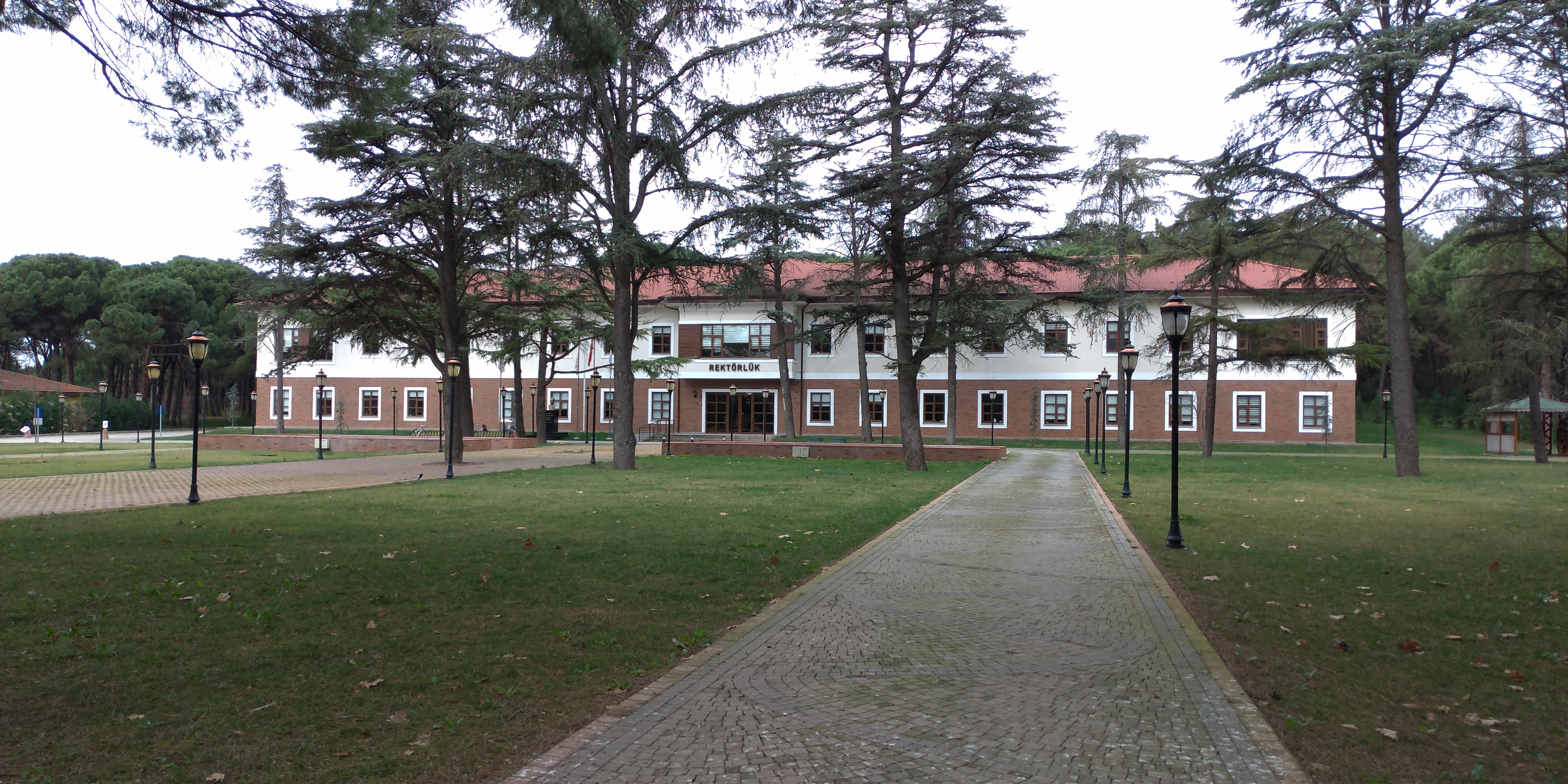
Gebze Technical University Rectorate building

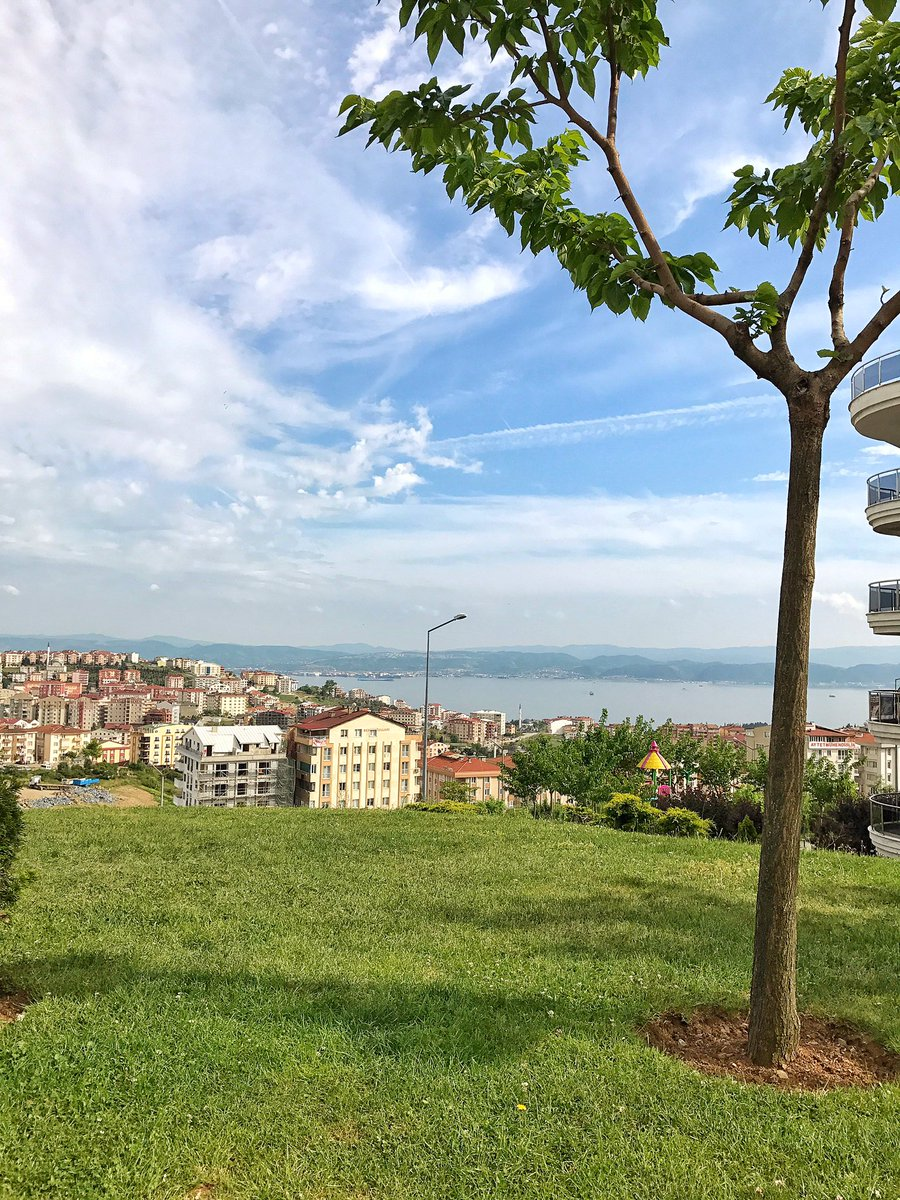
View of Gebze

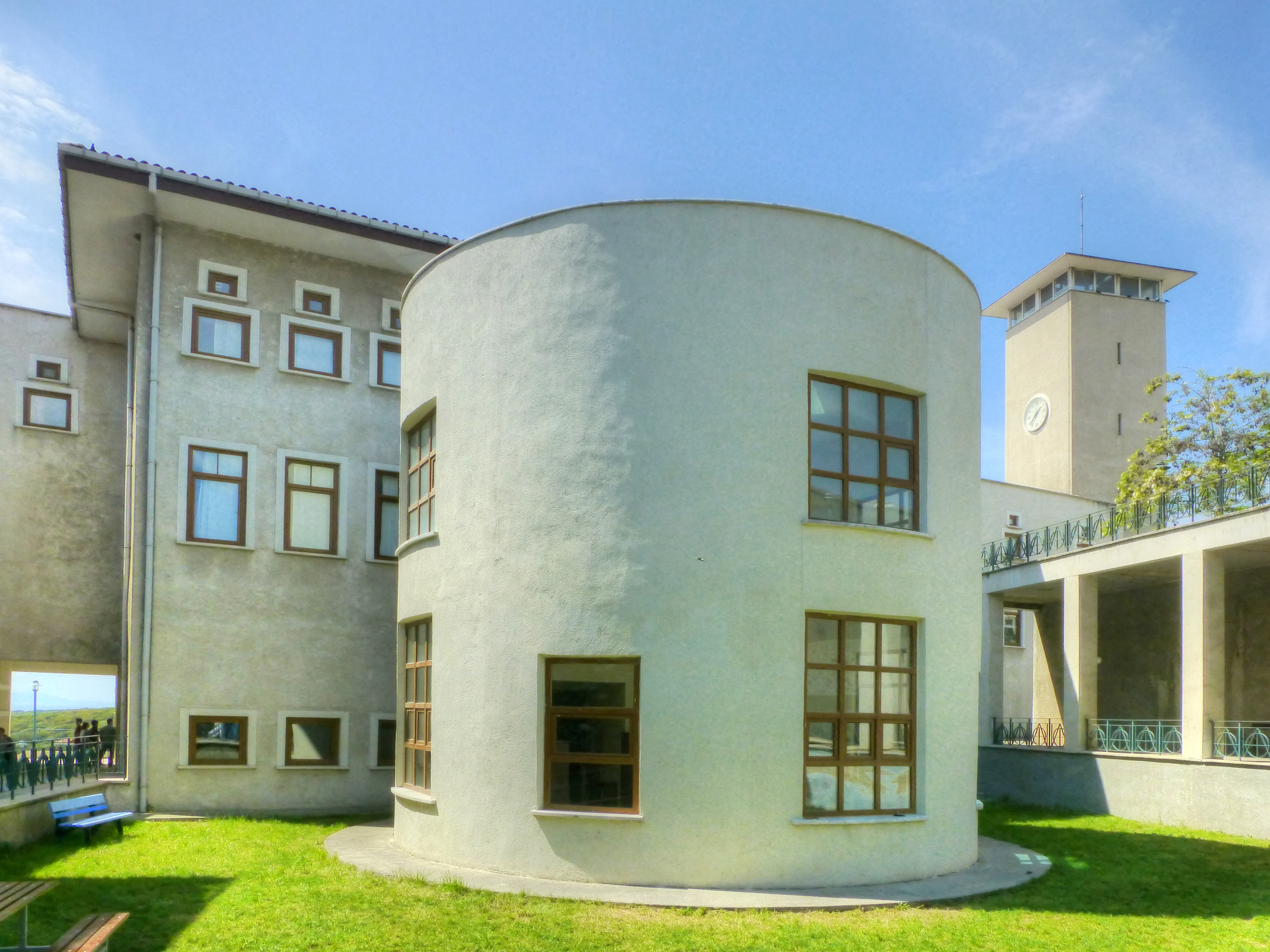
TEVİTOL

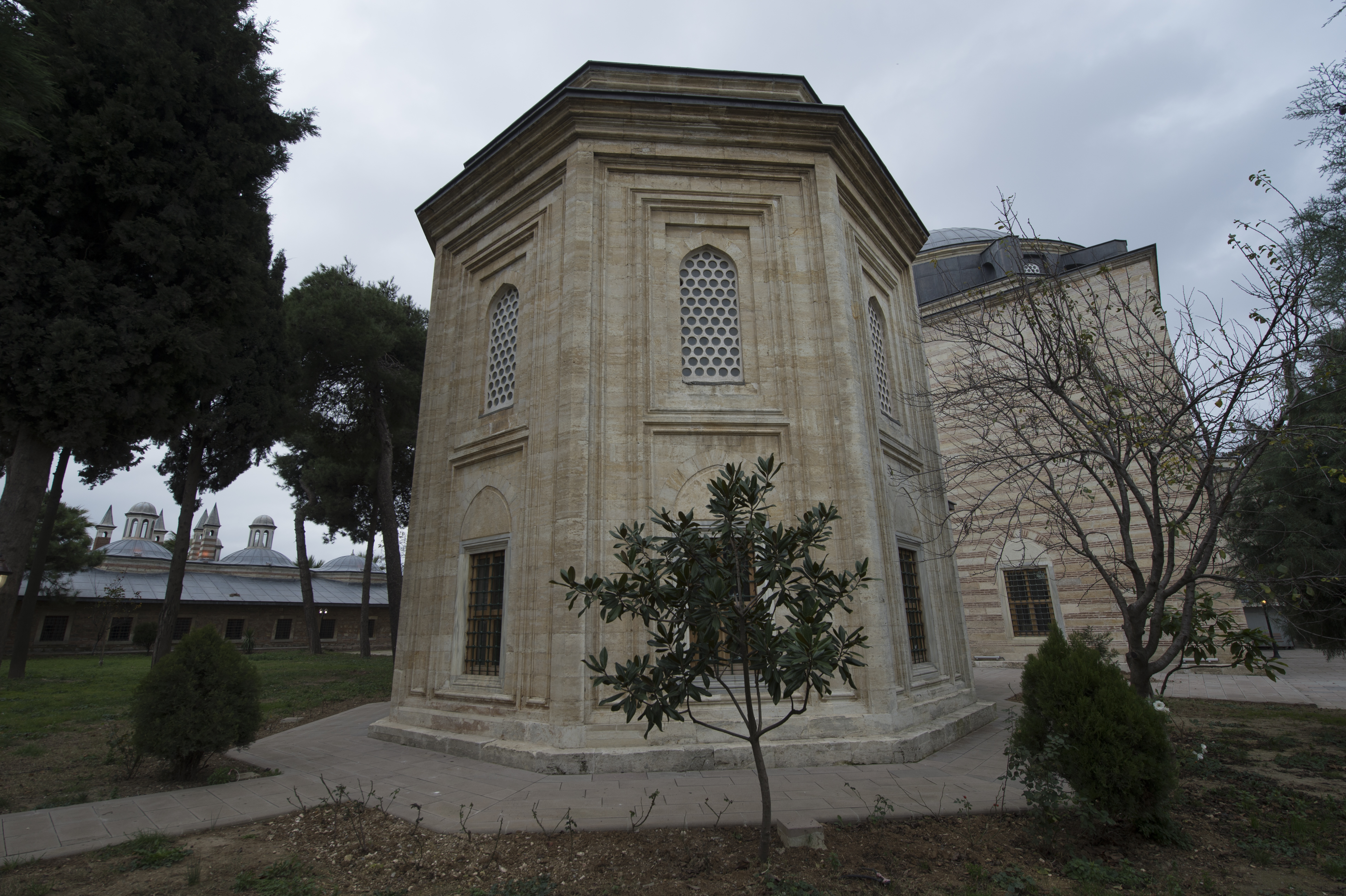
Çoban Mustafa Pasha Külliyesi Mausoleum

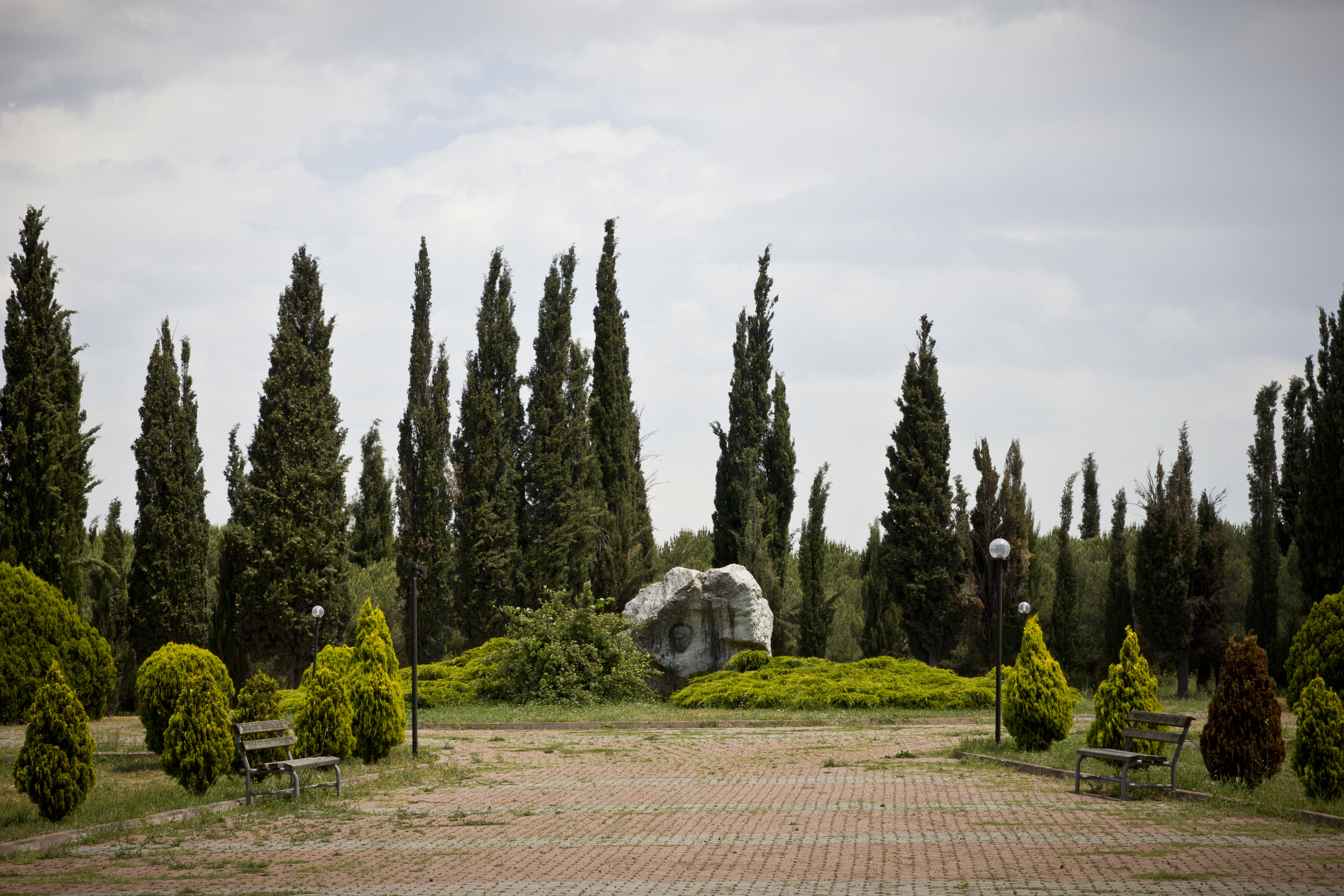
The bust of Hannibal

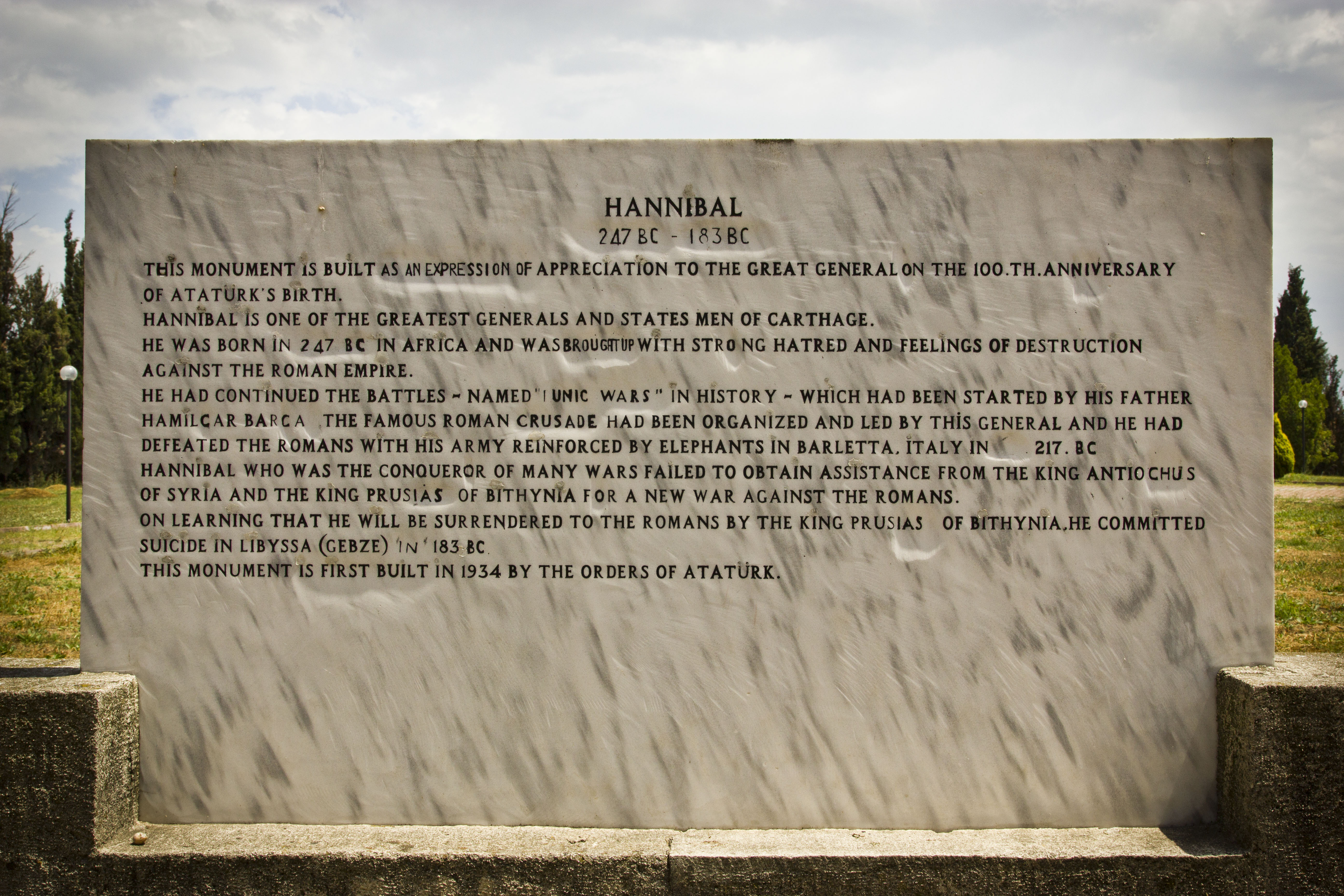
The bust of Hannibal

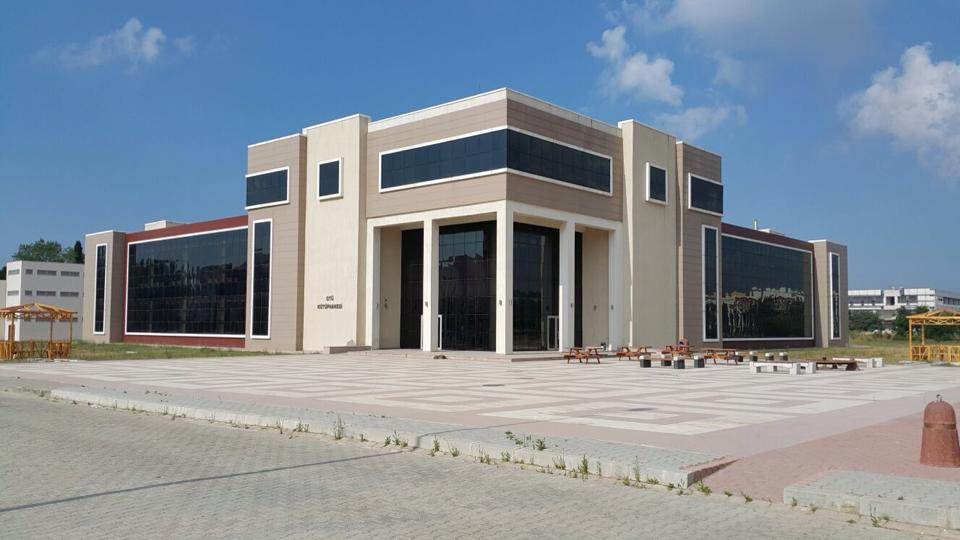
Gebze Technical University

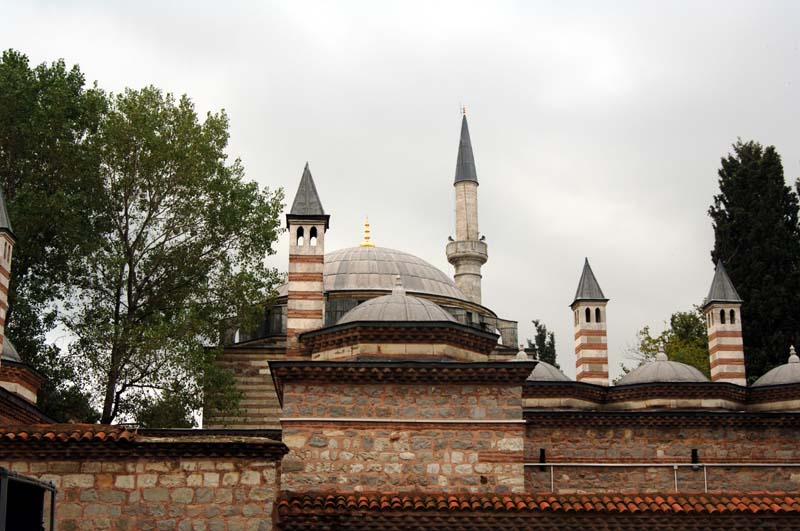
Çoban Mustafa Pasha Mosque
