= Gülen movement schools =

Network of private schools founded by Turkish-Americans

The Gülen movement schools are a network of private or semi-private schools founded by Turkish-Americans. Alp Aslandoğan, executive director of the non-profit organisation Alliance for Shared Values has said that the schools are independent yet indirectly tied to the Islamic Gülen movement on the "intellectual or inspirational level." In 2009, it was estimated that members of the Gülen movement ran schools that serve more than 2 million students, many with full scholarships. Estimates of the number of schools and educational institutions varied widely, with about 300 schools in Turkey and over 1,000 schools worldwide.

Prior to the 2016 Turkish coup d'état attempt, there were many Gülen schools in Turkey. The schools were all subsequently banned by law, as were other Gülen schools in countries with large Turkish populations. Despite Turkey's official request, the United States did not extradite Gülen.

Gülen schools in the United States, which provide solely secular education to children mostly from low-income households, receive federal financial support.

== Curriculum ==
The curricula of the schools vary from country to country. They generally follow a secular mixture of Turkish and local curricula.

=== Language instruction ===
Gülen schools promote education in the local languages where they are located, including the controversial use of Kurdish in Turkey. In many countries instruction is in English. However, all of the schools outside of Turkey offer Turkish as either a mandatory or elective foreign language.

=== Science and mathematics ===
Gülen schools heavily emphasize instruction in the fields of science, technology, engineering, and mathematics (STEM).

=== Islamic component ===
Gülen schools are not for Muslims alone, and in Turkey "the general curriculum for the network's schools prescribes one hour of religious instruction per week, while in many countries the schools do not offer any religious instruction at all. With the exception of a few Imam-Hatip schools abroad, these institutions can thus hardly be considered Islamic schools in the strict sense." The greatest majority of the teachers are drawn from members of the Gülen network, who reportedly encourage students in the direction of greater piety. A 2008 article in the New York Times said that in Pakistan "they encourage Islam in their dormitories, where teachers set examples in lifestyle and prayer", and described the Turkish schools as offering a gentler approach to Islam that could help reduce the influence of extremism.

== School organization ==
Schools established by the Gülen movement are usually private or semi-private schools founded by the members of the movement who are inspired by the Islamic cleric Fethullah Gülen. In addition there are many American charter schools founded or managed by members of Gülen movement.

=== Private schools ===
In 2009, it was estimated that members of the Gülen movement run schools that serve more than 2 million students. Estimates of the number of schools and educational institutions vary widely, from about 300 schools in Turkey to over 1,000 schools worldwide. There are Gülen schools in countries with large Turkish populations, such as the United States, Germany, and Canada. Gülen schools in non-Turkish Muslim countries provide families an alternative to madrasa education.

==== Evaluations of private Gülen Movement schools ====
Gülen Movement Schools have received both praise and criticism.

The achievements of these schools are often highlighted in publications or websites managed by the Gülen movement. For example, Somali Higher Education and Culture Minister Duale Mohamed Adem praised the contributions of the schools to the Somali people. Foluso Oluwole Adeshida, Nigeria's deputy ambassador to Ankara, praised the 16 schools in his country. Pakistani Prime Minister Nawaz Sharif praised the 23 PakTurk International Schools and Colleges in his country.

The 17 Gülen-inspired schools in Australia rank highly in comparisons to other schools in terms of academic results and retention rates.

Two American professors at the Lutheran Theological Seminary at Philadelphia and Temple University wrote that "these schools have consistently promoted good learning and citizenship, and the Hizmet movement is to date an evidently admirable civil society organization to build bridges between religious communities and to provide direct service on behalf of the common good". Participants in the movement have also founded private universities.

Other commentators disagree with these assessments and are suspicious of the anti-integrative potential of Gülen-movement schools. In 2008, the Dutch government investigated the movement's activities in the Netherlands. Following the investigation, the Dutch government, concluding that the Gülen schools did indeed promote "anti-integrative behavior," reduced their public funding. This decision was overturned in 2010 and funding was restored after an investigation by the Dutch intelligence organization AIVD and an assigned academician Martin van Bruinessen which resulted in findings that Gülen movement schools did not represent a threat to Dutch society.

In April 2009, Radio Free Europe/Radio Liberty published a piece about the Gülen schools in Central Asia stating the "Turkish educational institutions have come under increasing scrutiny ... Governments as well as many scholars and journalists suspect that the schools have more than just education on their agendas ..." The article quoted Hakan Yavuz, a Turkish professor of political science at the University of Utah, as calling the Gülen movement:

a political movement ... and it has always been political ... They want to train an elitist class that will then turn Turkey into a centre of the religious World, Islamise the country ... It is the most powerful movement right now in [Turkey] ... There is no other movement to balance them in society.

In April 2010, Trend News Agency published a piece about the Gülen schools in Georgia. Excerpt: "The Georgian Labor Party protested the opening of Turkish schools in Georgia. The party's Political Secretary Giorgi Gugava called the mass opening of Turkish schools in Georgia, "the dominance of Turkey in the Georgian educational system," and noted that these schools aim to spread Turkish culture and fundamentalist religious ideas...Gugava said the process is headed by Turkish religious leader Fetullah Gülen, whose activities are banned in his motherland..."

=== American charter schools founded and/or managed by Hizmet members ===
Professor Joshua Hendrick of Loyola University Maryland, who studies the movement, said that Gülen himself "does not have a direct hand in operating" the charter schools, and it was reported that Gülen has never visited the schools. The Harmony Schools in Texas do not teach religion, and the charter network says that some 7.8% of its teachers are non-Americans.

==== Evaluations ====
===== Academic achievement =====
Many charter schools founded or managed by members of the Gülen movement emphasize instruction in science, technology, engineering, and mathematics (STEM). The achievements of students in these fields are often highlighted on school websites.

The Kenilworth Science and Technology Charter School in East Baton Rouge Parish Louisiana, has posted large gains in academic performance which resulted in a renewal of its charter.

Member schools of the Concept Schools network of charter schools have won numerous designations such as Blue Ribbon School designations, mention in U.S. News & World Report Best High Schools, Ohio State Department of Education designations as "Excellent" and "Schools of Progress." Students from Concept Schools have won numerous awards and honors such as acceptance at the Intel International Science Fair and the International Environmental Project Olympiad in Azerbaijan. Teams from Concept Schools have won awards in chess tournaments and regional robotics competitions.

In the 2012=2014 the Beehive Science and Technology Academy, a 6-12 school, student achievement according to the Utah State Report Card was above the state average in the 2012–2013 school year and achieved a "B" rating, and scored above the Utah mean in the 8th grade writing assessment.

===== Criticisms of management =====
There are many allegations about money-laundering, kickbacks, investigations, and raids concerning charter schools founded or operated by Gülen followers.

The FBI has investigated Concept Schools, which operate 16 Horizon Science Academies across Ohio, on the suspicion that they illegally used taxpayer money to pay immigration and legal fees for people they never even employed, an Ohio ABC affiliate discovered. The FBI's suspicion was confirmed by state auditors. Concept Schools repaid the fees for their Cleveland and Toledo schools shortly before the ABC story broke, but it's unclear whether they have repaid—or can repay—the fees for their other schools. name="ChronDec2013">{{cite news The Philadelphia Inquirer reported at the time that Gülen schools were one of the largest users of H1B visas, receiving approval for 684 such visas in 2009. The Inquirer reported that the FBI, Labor Department, and Education Department were investigating whether some charter school employees employed via H1B visas misused funds by kicking back a portion of their salaries to movement groups. The investigation had no tie to terrorism, and there was "no indication the American charter network has a religious agenda in the classroom".

Two schools, located in Texas, have been accused of sending school funds—which are supplied by the government—to Gülen-inspired organizations. Last year, The New York Times reported that the some schools were funneling some $50 million in public funds to a network of Turkish construction companies, among them the Gülen-related Atlas Texas Construction and Trading. The schools had hired Atlas to do construction, the paper said, though other bidders claimed in lawsuits that they had submitted more economical bids. Folwell Dunbar, an official at the Louisiana Department of Education, has accused Atlas's vice president, Inci Akpinar, of offering him a $25,000 bribe to keep mum about troubling conditions at the Abramson Science and Technology School in New Orleans. Dunbar sent a memo to department colleagues, the Times-Picayune reported, noting that "Akpinar flattered him with 'a number of compliments' before getting to the point: 'I have twenty-five thousand dollars to fix this problem: twenty thousand for you and five for me.' " Abramson is operated by the Pelican Foundation, which is linked to the Gülen-inspired Cosmos Foundation in Texas—which runs the two Texas schools.

One of the Cosmos Foundation's school systems, Harmony Public Schools, was subject to a compliance review by the United States Department of Education's Office for Civil Rights, examining whether the system was compliant with Title VI of the 1964 Civil Rights Act (prohibiting discrimination on the basis of race, color or national origin), Section 504 of the Rehabilitation Act (prohibiting discrimination on the basis of disability in education programs operated by recipients of federal financial assistance), and Title II of the 1990 Americans with Disabilities Act (prohibiting discrimination on the basis of disability by public entities). The OCR's investigation found that although HPS's admissions policies, procedures, and information provided to prospective students and their parents were prima facie non-discriminatory, the school systems' enrolments of disabled students and English-language learners were significantly lower than for public school districts covering the same geographical areas. In late 2014 the investigation was closed after HPS submitted proposals to resolve the issues identified by the OCR.

Utah's Beehive Science and Technology Academy was $337,000 in debt, according to a financial probe by the Utah Schools Charter Board. The Deseret News tried to figure out where all this taxpayer money had gone. "In a time of teacher layoffs, Beehive has recruited a high percentage of teachers from overseas, mainly Turkey," the newspaper reported. "Many of these teachers had little or no teaching experience before they came to the United States. Some of them are still not certified to teach in Utah. The school spent more than $53,000 on immigration fees for foreigners in five years. During the same time, administrators spent less than $100,000 on textbooks, according to state records." Reports have also claimed that the school board was almost entirely Turkish.

A reporter for the magazine In These Times noted in 2010 that the Chicago Math and Science Academy obscured its relationship to Gülen. Furthermore, the school board was strikingly similar to Beehive's:

When I went to the school's board meeting on July 8, I was taken aback to see a board of directors comprised entirely of men. They all appeared of Turkish, Bosnian or Croatian descent. Although I have nothing against Turkish, Bosnian or Croatian men, it does seem that a school board serving students who are 58 percent Hispanic/Latino, 25 percent African American, 12 percent Asian and 5 percent white might be well served by some women board members and board members from ethnic backgrounds the school predominantly serves.

In August 2016 former head of the American Federation of Teachers' Strategic Campaign Department Gene Bruskin wrote an article for AlterNet arguing that the Gülen movement's charter school network "severely tested" the American model of a secular state, due to what he sees as the missionary nature of the Gülen movement and the way the Gülen schools often played down their links to the movement. He also asserted that publicly available teacher rosters and labour condition applications for the Turkish teachers frequently employed in the Gülen schools illustrated that American teachers employed by the schools were often paid less than their Turkish counterparts.

== Activities ==
=== Turkish Language Olympiads ===
The Gülen movement runs the International Turkish Language Olympiads (Turkish: Uluslararası Türkçe Olimpiyatları), an annual competition in the Turkish language. Students who have learned Turkish from over a hundred countries compete in different titles such as: grammar, oral skills, writing essays, reciting poems, singing songs, theatre, general culture, etc.

Some school‑level Turkish‑language competitions evolved into the International Turkish Language Olympiads (first held 2003). From the mid‑2010s the organisers have presented similar programmes internationally under the name "International Festival of Language and Culture(IFLC)".

== List of International Universities ==
- Ala-Too International University (1996-Present), Kyrgyzstan
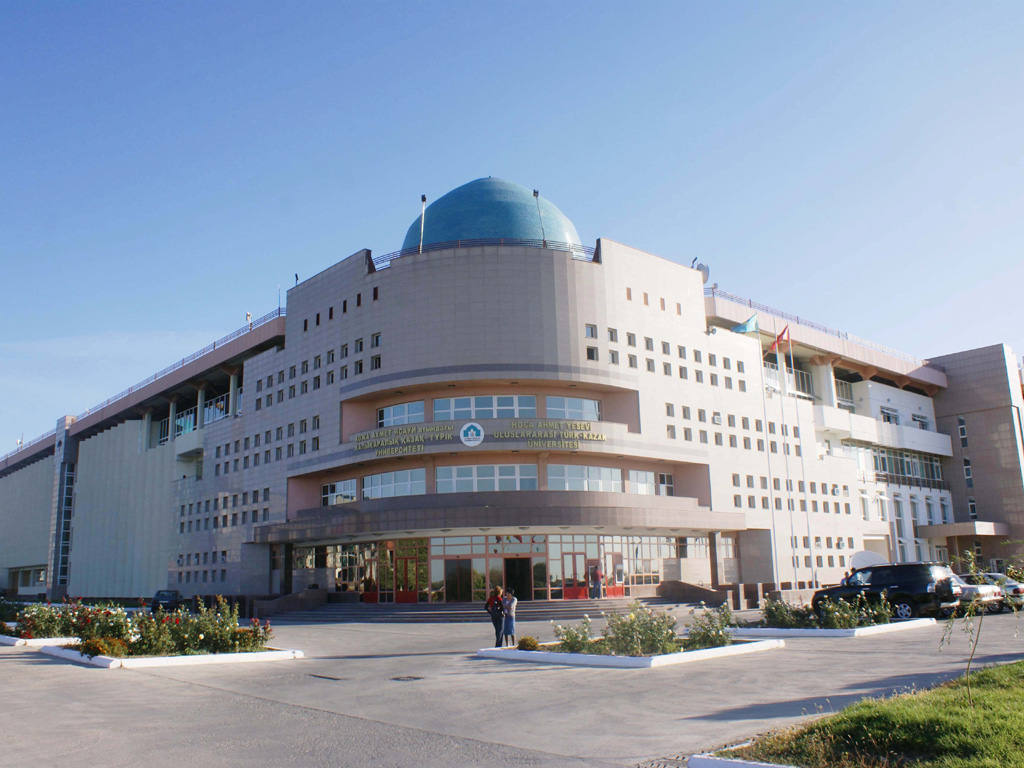
- Ahmet Yassawi University, Kazakhstan
  International Burch University (2008–Present), Bosnia and Herzegovina
- International Black Sea University, Georgia
- Ahmet Yassawi University, Kazakhstan
- International Turkmen-Turkish University, Turkmenistan
- North American University, United States
- Nile University of Nigeria, Nigeria
- Paragon International University (renamed from Zaman University), Cambodia

== List of Universities in Turkey ==
- Fatih University (closed in 2016), Istanbul, Turkey
- Bursa Orhangazi University (closed in 2016), Bursa, Turkey
- Canik Başarı University (closed in 2016), Turkey
- Gediz University (closed in 2016), Izmir, Turkey
- Işık University (closed in 2016), Turkey
- İpek University (closed in 2016), Ankara, Turkey
- İzmir University (closed in 2016), Izmir, Turkey
- Kanuni University (closed in 2016), Adana, Turkey
- Melikşah University (closed in 2016), Kayseri, Turkey
- Mevlana University (closed in 2016), Konya, Turkey
- Murat Hüdavendigar University (closed in 2016), Istanbul
- Turgut Özal University (closed in 2016), Ankara, Turkey
- Selahattin Eyyubi University (closed in 2016), Diyarbakir, Turkey
- Süleyman Şah University (closed in 2016), Istanbul, Turkey
- Şifa University (closed in 2016), Izmir, Turkey
- Zirve University (closed in 2016), Gaziantep, Turkey
