= List of educational institutions closed in the 2016 Turkish purges =

This is a list of educational institutions that were shut down in the course of the 2016 Turkish purges.

On 23 July 2016, President Recep Tayyip Erdoğan shut down 1,043 private schools, 1,229 charities and foundations, 19 trade unions, 15 universities and 35 medical institutions in his first emergency decree under the newly adopted emergency legislation.

== Universities ==
The following fifteen private universities, many of them allegedly affiliated to the Gülen movement, were shut down:

1. İpek University, Ankara
2. Bursa Orhangazi University, Bursa
3. Canik Başarı University, Samsun
4. Selahattin Eyyubi University, Diyarbakır
5. Fatih University, Istanbul.
6. Melikşah University, Kayseri
7. Mevlana University, Konya
8. Şifa University, Izmir Its affiliated hospitals and outpatient clinics, were also closed, with the exception of Healing Hospital (Şifa Hastanesi) in Bornova.
9. Turgut Özal University, Ankara
10. Zirve University, Gaziantep
11. Kanuni University, Adana
12. İzmir University, Izmir
13. Murat Hüdavendigar University, Istanbul
14. Gediz University, Izmir
15. Süleyman Şah University, Istanbul

According to re-organization of the Armed Forces, all military academies are closed:

1. Air Force Academy
2. Gülhane Military Academy of Medicine
3. Military Academy
4. Naval Academy

== Health services ==
35 health services/hospitals shut down on 23 July 2016.

1. Özel Gümüşiğne Fizik Tedavi Ve Rehabilitasyon Tıp Merkezi, Ankara
2. Akpol Tıp Merkezi, Ankara
3. Gümüşiğne Ftr Merkezi, Ankara
4. Nurlu Göz Hastanesi, Ankara
5. Sincan Bilgi Tıp Merkezi, Ankara
6. Turgut Özal Üniv. Dializ Merkezi, Ankara
7. Turgut Özal Üniv. S.U.A.M., Ankara
8. Özel Bahar Hastanesi, Bursa
9. Özel Rentıp Hastanesi, Bursa
10. Özel Erzurum Şifa Hastanesi, Erzurum
11. Özel Şifa Dializ Merkezi, Erzurum
12. Özel Primer Hospital Hastanesi, Gaziantep
13. Fatih Üniversitesi Sema U.A. Merkezi, İstanbul
14. Özel Burç Genetik Hastalıkları Tanı Merkezi, İstanbul
15. Özel Donegen Genetik Hastalıkları Tanı Merkezi, İstanbul
16. Özel İstanbul Kadın Sağlığı Ve Tüp Bebek Merkezi, İstanbul
17. İzmir Şifa Üniversitesi Bornova Dializ Merkezi, İzmir
18. İzmir Şifa Üniversitesi Bornova Sağl. Uyg. Arş. Merkezi, İzmir
19. Hacettepe Ftr Merkezi, Kayseri
20. Özel Kayseri Göz Hastanesi, Kayseri
21. Mevlana Üniversitesi Dializ Merkezi, Konya
22. Mevlana Üniversitesi Hastanesi, Konya
23. Özel Kütahya Kent Hastanesi, Kütahya
24. Özel Altınova Hastanesi, Sakarya
25. Özel Ailemiz Tıp Merkezi, Şanlıurfa
26. Özel Anadolu Göz Hastalıkları Dal Merkezi, Şanlıurfa
27. Özel Baran Tıp Merkezi, Şanlıurfa
28. Özel Doğa Tıp Merkezi, Şanlıurfa
29. Özel Harranmed Kadın Hastalıkları Ve Doğum Dal Merkezi, Şanlıurfa
30. Özel Kurtuluş Dahiliye Dal Merkezi, Şanlıurfa
31. Özel Osm Ortadoğu Hastanesi, Şanlıurfa
32. Özel Ufuk Tıp Merkezi, Şanlıurfa
33. Özel Urfa Ftr Dal Merkezi, Şanlıurfa
34. Özel Uzmanlar Tıp Merkezi, Şanlıurfa
35. Özel İstanbul Kadın Doğum Ve Cerrahi Hastanesi, Van
