= List of universities in İzmir =

This is a list of universities in İzmir, of which there are currently nine.

== Public universities ==
Name	Year of foundation
Ege University	1955
Dokuz Eylül University	1982
İzmir Institute of Technology	1992
İzmir Kâtip Çelebi University	2010
İzmir Bakırçay University	2016
İzmir Democracy University	2016

== Private universities ==
Name	Year of foundation
İzmir University of Economics	2001
Yaşar University	2001
İzmir Tınaztepe University	2018

== Former universities ==
Name	Year of foundation	Shutdown	Type
Ionian University of Smyrna	1920	1922	Public
İzmir University	2007	2016	Private
Gediz University	2008	2016	Private
Şifa University	2011	2016	Private

== See also ==
- List of universities in Istanbul
- List of universities in Ankara
- List of universities in Turkey
- Education in Turkey
