= Samsun University =

Public university in Samsun, Turkey

- Motto: A qualified university for a qualified society!
- Type: Public
- Established: 2018
- Location: Samsun, Turkey
- Website: samsun.edu.tr

Samsun University (Turkish: Samsun Üniversitesi, commonly shortened to SAMÜ) is a public university in Samsun, Turkey. It was formed on 31 May 2018 by the separation from Ondokuz Mayıs University.

The main campus of Samsun University, the second public university in Samsun, is located in Canik district.

== History ==
Samsun's first university was Ondokuz Mayıs University founded in 1975. The second university established in Samsun was Canik Başarı University, which started education as a private university in 2012. It was one of the educational institutions closed in 2016 following the attempted coup d'état, due to its affiliation to the Gülen movement, and its students and their rights to use physical structures were transferred to Ondokuz Mayıs University. Upon this, the Politicians in the city, Professional associations and Non-governmental organizations called for the establishment of a new public university to replace the closed university.

In 2018, some academic units from Ondokuz Mayıs University such as Faculty of Aviation and Space Sciences, School of Civil Aviation and Kavak Vocational School became a part of newly established Samsun University. Other academic units such as The Faculty of Engineering, Faculty of Economics, Administrative, and Social Sciences and Faculty of Architecture and Design, were all re-established under the new university.

Samsun University Faculty of Medicine was founded on 31 August 2020 in Canik campus.

The logo of Samsun University, which started providing education on 24 September 2018, was chosen on 28 October 2018.

== Academic units ==
As of 2021, the university has five faculties, one college, one institute and two Vocational schools.

=== Faculties ===
- Faculty of Engineering
- Faculty of Aviation and Space Sciences
- Faculty of Economics, Administration, and Social sciences
- Faculty of Architecture, Design and Fine arts
- Faculty of Medicine

=== Institute ===
- Graduate School

=== College ===
- School of Civil aviation

=== Vocational schools ===
- Kavak Vocational School
- Vocational School of Technical Sciences

== Campuses ==
=== Ballıca ===
Located in Ballıca in Ondokuzmayıs district. There are Faculty of Aviation and Space Sciences, Faculty of Engineering and School of Civil Aviation and Vocational School of Technical Sciences. There are also dormitories for students in the campus. It is designed as a campus where technical sciences are predominant.

=== Canik ===
Located in Canik district. There are Faculty of Economics, Administrative, and Social Sciences and Faculty of Architecture, Design and Fine Arts and Faculty of Medicine. It is designed as a campus where social sciences are predominant.

== Student clubs ==
There are 26 clubs at the university. In addition to these student clubs, there are engineering teams carrying out R&D studies. Tanyeli Rocket team, whose members consist of students from both Samsun University and 19 Mayıs University, were placed first at Teknofest Aerospace and Technology Festival 2020 in the 1500 meter low-altitude category.

== See also ==
- List of universities in Turkey
