= List of universities in Ankara =

This list of universities in Ankara lists the universities within the city limits of Ankara.

== Public universities ==
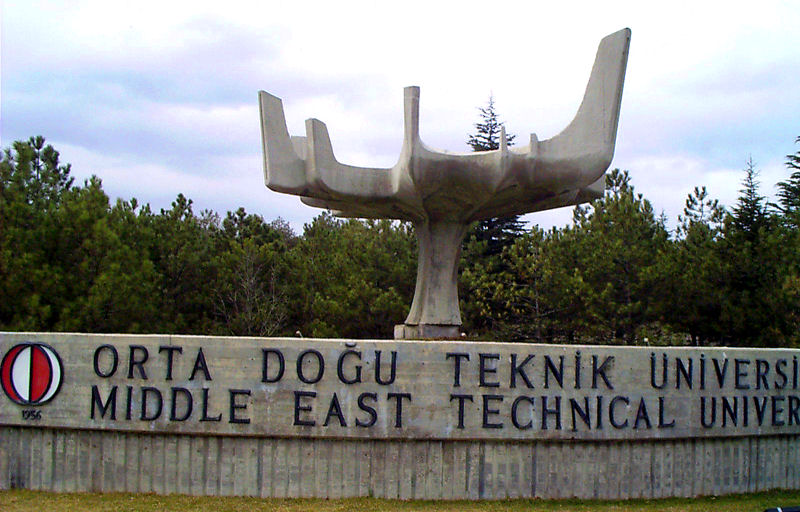
Statue of Tree of Science, Middle East Technical University

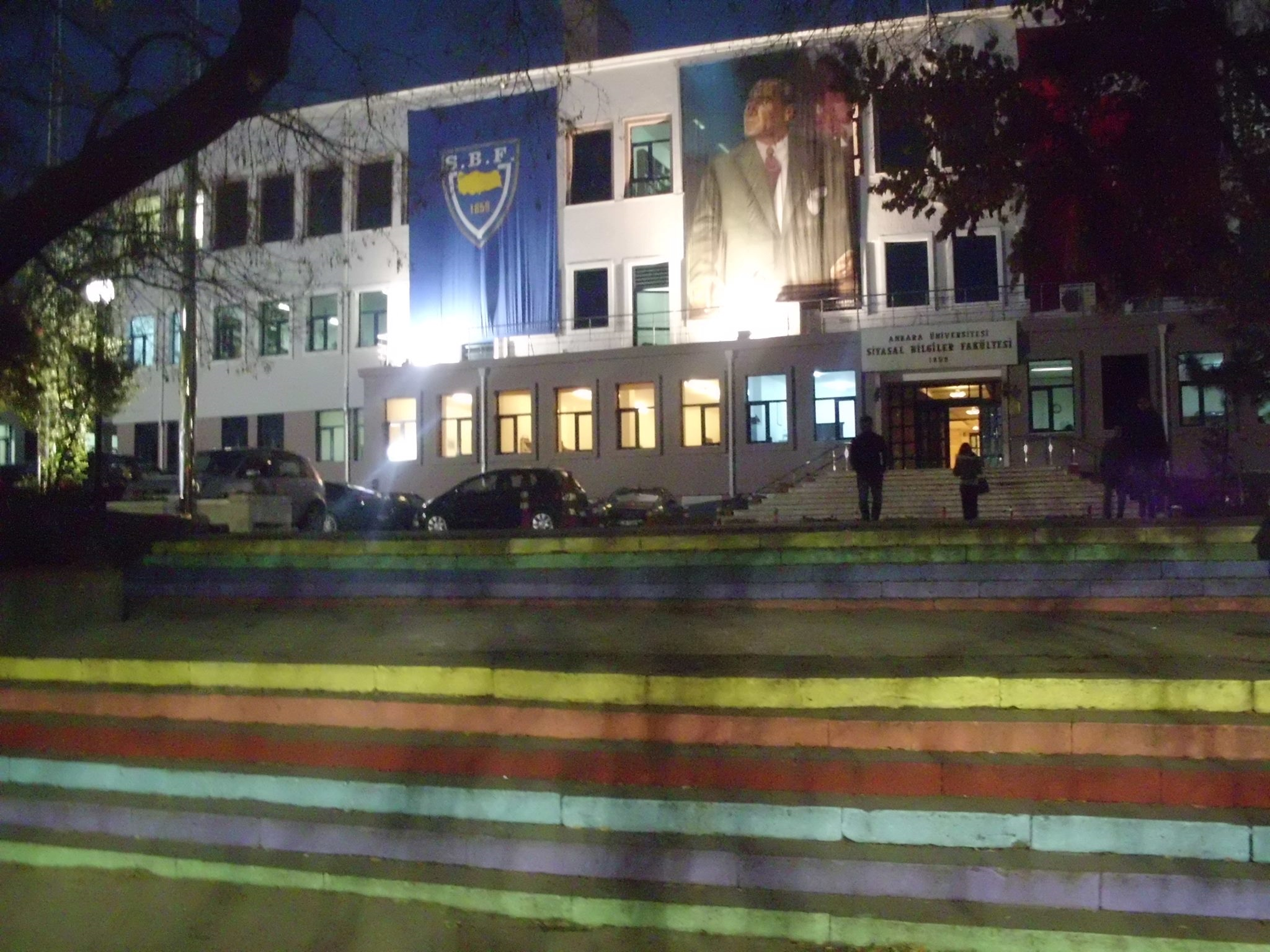
Faculty of Political Science, Ankara University

Name	Year of foundation
Gazi University	1926
Ankara University	1946
Middle East Technical University	1956
Hacettepe University	1967
Ankara Yıldırım Beyazıt University	2010
Social Sciences University of Ankara	2013
Ankara Music and Fine Arts University	2017
Ankara Hacı Bayram Veli University	2018

== Private universities ==
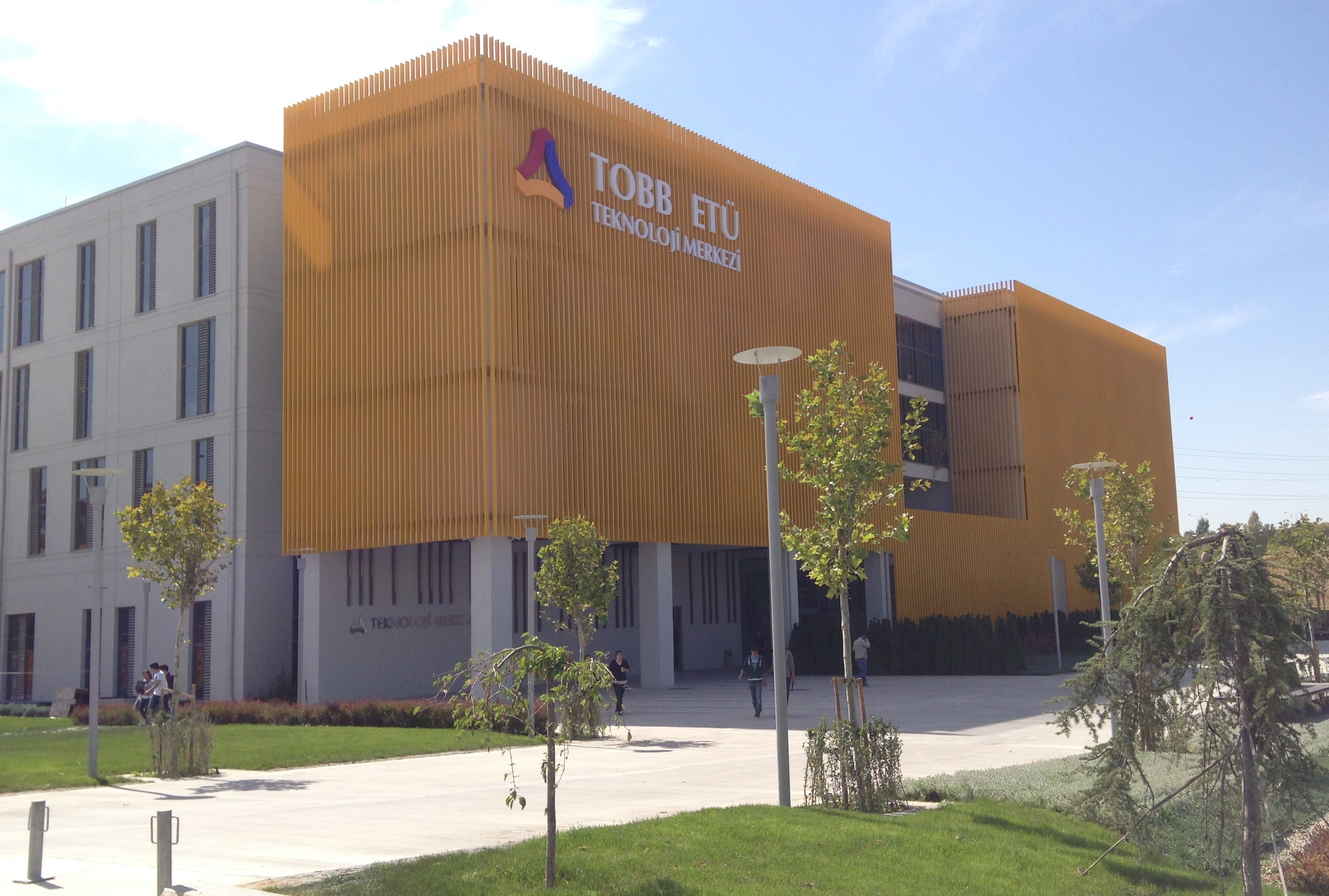
TOBB University of Economics and Technology

Name	Year of foundation
Bilkent University	1984
Başkent University	1994
Atılım University	1996
Çankaya University	1999
Ufuk University	1999
TOBB University of Economics and Technology	2003
TED University	2009
University of Turkish Aeronautical Association	2011
Yüksek İhtisas University	2011
OSTIM Technical University	2017
Ankara Medipol University	2018
Lokman Hekim University	2018
Ankara Science University	2020

== Former universities ==
Name	Year of foundation	Shutdown	Type
İpek University	2011	2016	Private
Turgut Özal University	2009	2016	Private

== See also ==
- List of universities in Istanbul
- List of universities in İzmir
- List of universities in Turkey
- Education in Turkey
