= Beykoz University =

Private university in İstanbul, Turkey

Coordinates: 41.0957°N 29.0916°E

- Beykoz Üniversitesi
- Type: Private non-profit foundation university
- Established: 2008 (as vocational school); 20 August 2016 (as university)
- Founder: Türkiye Lojistik Araştırmaları ve Eğitim Vakfı (TÜRLEV)
- Affiliations: Acadex , International Student Partnership Association (ISPA)
- Rector: Prof.Dr. Burak Küntay
- Location: Istanbul, Turkey
- Preceded by: Beykoz Vocational School of Logistics
- Colors: Burgundy and dark grey
- Website: www.beykoz.edu.tr/ln/en

Beykoz University (Turkish: Beykoz Üniversitesi) is a private non-profit foundation university in Istanbul, Turkey. It was established on 20 August 2016 with other 3 new universities. (Note: These are Istanbul Kent University, İzmir Bakırçay University and İzmir Democracy University)

Beykoz University was founded as the successor of Beykoz Vocational School of Logistics (Beykoz Lojistik Meslek Yüksekokulu) by TÜRLEV.

== Beykoz University Faculties ==
- Faculty of business
- Faculty of Arts
- Faculty of Social Sciences
- Faculty of Engineering and Architecture

== Beykoz University Tuition ==
Beykoz University fees for undergraduate programs range between 2,500.00 USD and 3,000,000 USD per year. Master programs costs 3,500.00 USD yearly.

== Beykoz University ISPA Affiliation ==
Turkey has become an accessible study destination for students from Africa, South Asia and the Middle East. As private university tuition is lower than in the UK or US, English-taught programs keep growing, and admission decisions come quickly.

ISPA is a professional association for agencies that place international students in Turkish universities. It was established in September, 2024 and it works together with universities that want a cleaner, more transparent recruitment channel.
