= İnci Aral =

Turkish writer

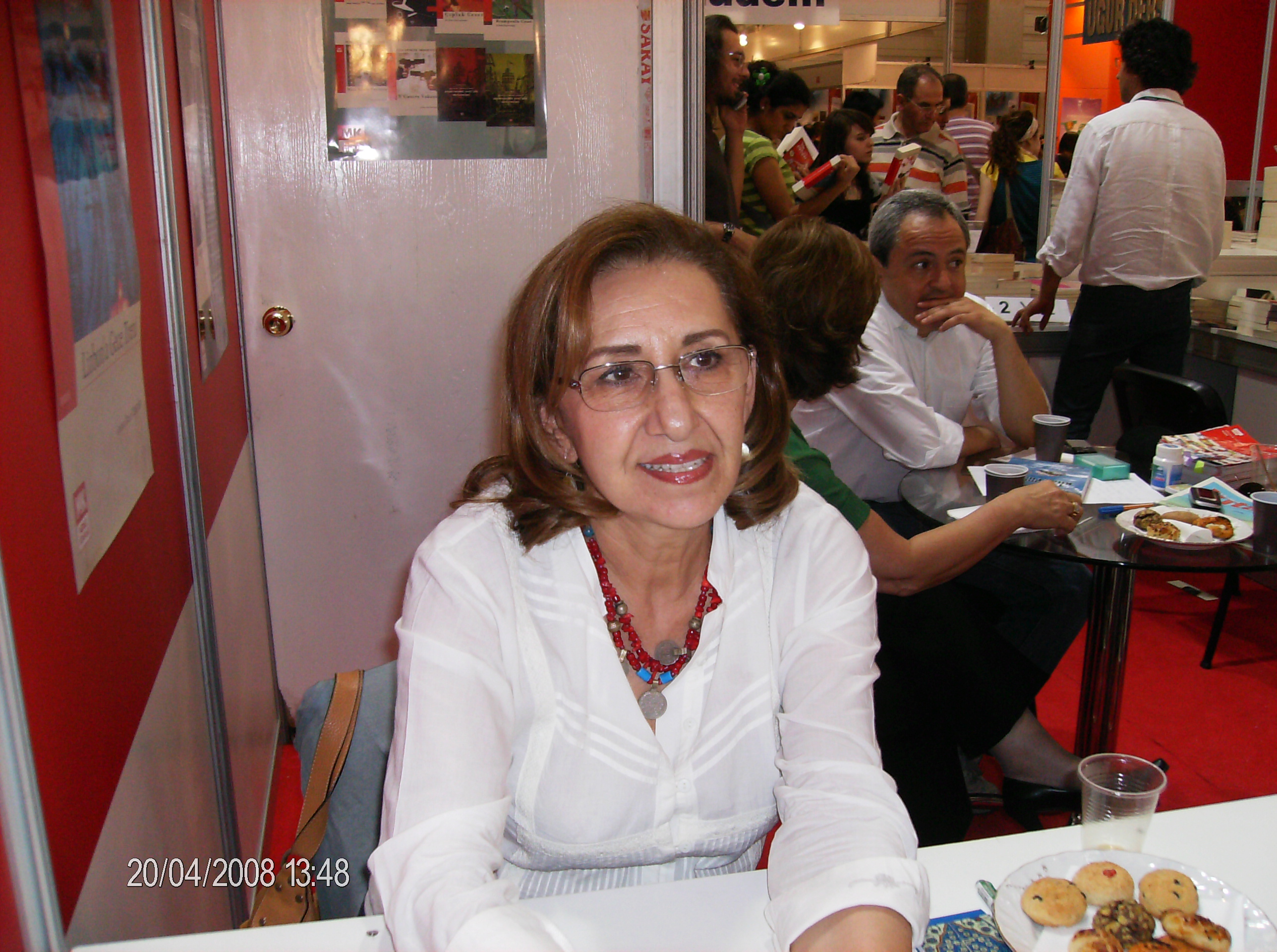

İnci Aral is a well-known Turkish writer of novels and short stories who has works published around the world. She was born in 1944 in Denizli, Turkey, a city in the southwestern part of Turkey. She currently lives in Istanbul, Turkey with her husband and two children. One of her popular stories was Ölü Erkek Kuşlar. Her novel Ağda Zaman was also well acclaimed.

After getting her degree in painting at the Gazi Institute of Education (current Gazi University), she became a teacher and taught at Manisa, Samsun, İzmir, and Ankara. Aral was originally trained as a painter, however, she felt her creativity could be applied elsewhere: writing. Initially, she created short stories, but later shifted her concentration towards writing novels. Many of her stories have been translated so they can be read in various languages including English and French. Although she is best known in Turkey, her outreach has spread to countries like the United States.

Her novels and short stories mainly focus on the development of society, specifically how women’s identity, love, and freedom impact society. While women are a main concern in most of her novels and short stories, she is not impartial to men. She narrates the two genders together, for she believes this harmony is crucial in order to properly portray the complete story of society.

During a speech at the Edinburgh World Writers' Conference in 2013, Aral presented her perspective of what the future holds for novels. In the speech, which can be found on The Guardian’s website, she claims that advancements in technology are a key determinate of how we live our lives and consume cultural goods. She believes that the world has become much faster paced because of technology and pressuring popular culture, leaving little room for the traditional novel to flourish like it once did. However the world may end up, which she says is unpredictable, she believes the novel will not be left unscathed by this intellectual revolution. While she knows novels are bound to change in length, she thinks there is plenty that can be done to save the novel. Aral advocates the idea of novels becoming more natural and “grasp[ing] life,” in order to regain a following in this new technological environment.

Some of her awards and honors include the merit from the Academy Book House for her story Ağda Zaman in 1980, the Nevzat Üstün Story Award for her book Kıran Resimleri in 1983, the Yunus Nadi Award for her book Ölü Erkek Kuşlar in 1992, and the Orhan Kemal Novel Award for the novel Mor in 2002.

== Artworks ==
=== Novel ===
- 1991 - Ölü Erkek Kuşlar
- 1994 - Yeni Yalan Zamanlar
- 1997 - Hiçbir Aşk Hiçbir Ölüm
- 1998 - İçimden Kuşlar Göçüyor
- 2002 - Mor
- 2005 - Taş ve Ten
- 2006 - Safran Sarı
- 2010 - Sadakat
- 2011 - Şarkını Söylediğin Zaman

=== Story ===
- 1979 - Ağda Zamanı
- 1983 - Kıran Resimleri
- 1984 - Uykusuzlar
- 1986 - Sevginin Eşsiz Kışı
- 2000 - Gölgede Kırk Derece
- 2003 - Anlar İzler Tutkular
- 2006 - Ruhumu Öpmeyi Unuttun

=== Essay - memoir - narrative ===
- 2003 - Anlar İzler Tutkular
- 2008 - Unutmak
- 2011 - Yazma Büyüsü
- 2016 - Kan Günleri ve Nar Ağrısı

=== Screenplay ===
- 1989 - Kirli Sarı
- 1995 - Buluşma
