= İzmir Institute of Technology =

Public university in İzmir, Turkey

- İzmir Yüksek Teknoloji Enstitüsü
- Motto: Türkiye'nin Teknoloji Üssü
- Motto in English: Turkey's Technology Base
- Type: Public technical university
- Established: 11 July 1992; 34 years ago
- Affiliations: EUA
- Rector: Yusuf Baran
- Faculty: 505
- Students: 8225
- Undergraduates: 5988
- Location: Urla, İzmir, Turkey; 38°19′13″N 26°38′11″E
- Campus: Rural, 6,060 ha (14,980 acres)
- Language: English
- Colors
- Website: iyte.edu.tr

University rankings

Regional – Overall
- QS Emerging Europe and Central Asia: 146 (2022)

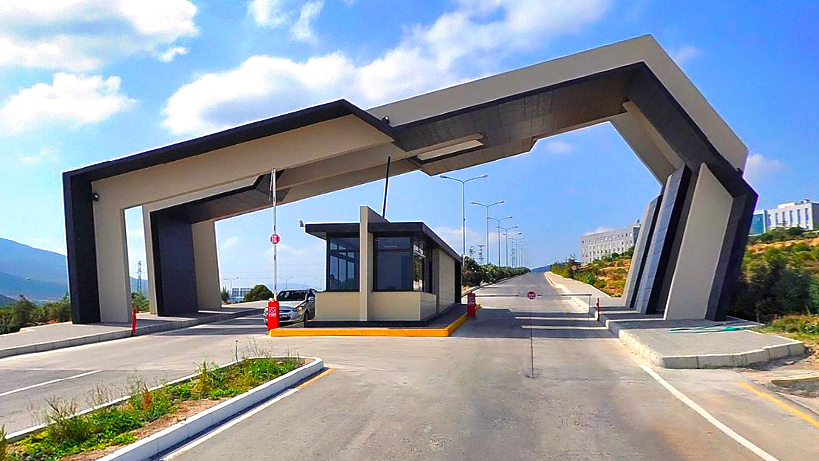
Entrance Gate of IZTECH

İzmir Institute of Technology (Turkish: İzmir Yüksek Teknoloji Enstitüsü, commonly referred to as IZTECH) is a public research university in İzmir, Turkey. The university places a strong emphasis on the natural sciences and engineering, and it is the only institution of its kind in Turkey with a specific focus on scientific research. İzmir Institute of Technology is frequently recognized among Turkey's leading universities. The medium of instruction in all departments is English.

== Organisation ==
Founded on July 11, 1992, İzmir Institute of Technology primarily focuses on the fields of science and technology. The university's main objectives include conducting research, providing education, and engaging in production, publication, and consultancy.

İzmir Institute of Technology has 16 academic departments, the majority of which are organized into three faculties. These departments are responsible for the undergraduate programs. Additionally, the university includes the Department of Foreign Languages and the Department of General Cultural Courses. The Graduate School of Engineering and Science is responsible for the postgraduate programs at İzmir Institute of Technology.

== İzmir Technology Development Zone ==
İzmir Technology Development Zone (commonly referred to as IZTECH Teknopark) is a science and research park which occupies an area of 225.5 hectares (557 acres) on the campus of IZTECH. Connection to the airport, seaport, and to the organised industrial districts is provided by the İzmir-Çeşme Highway. The zone has five buildings in 12,200 m^{2} (131,000 sq ft) of enclosed space.

== Criticism ==
İzmir Institute of Technology is known for its selective admissions and rigorous academic standards. Many students either drop out early or take longer than usual to complete their studies. Particularly in the Faculty of Engineering, only about half of the students graduate within the typical duration of their programs.

== See also ==
- Institute of technology
- Gebze Technical University
- List of universities in İzmir
