= Ahmet Telli =

Turkish poet (1946–2026)

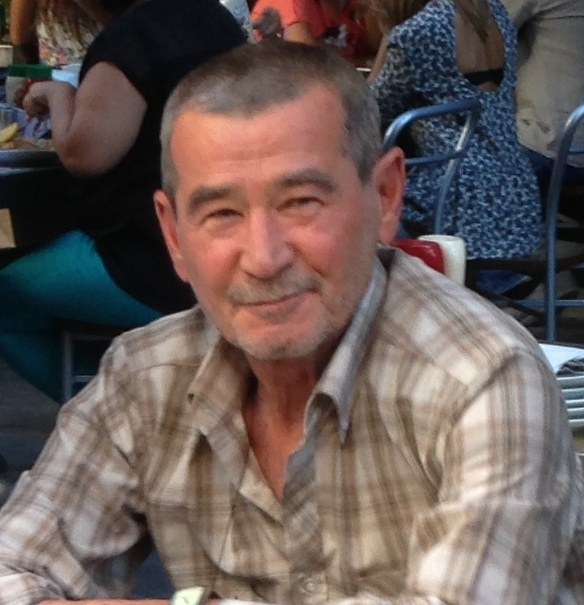
- Telli in 2013
- Born: 2 December 1946; Eskipazar, Çankırı Province, Turkey
- Died: 10 July 2026 (aged 79); Ankara, Turkey
- Education: Gazi Institute of Education
- Occupations: Poet; teacher; editor
- Writing career
- Language: Turkish
- Period: 1961–2026
- Genres: Poetry; essay
- Notable works: Hüznün İsyan Olur; Dövüşen Anlatsın; Su Çürüdü; Belki Yine Gelirim; Nidâ
- Literary movement: Socialist realism

Ahmet Telli (2 December 1946 – 10 July 2026) was a Turkish poet, teacher and editor. He is regarded as one of the prominent representatives of the second generation of socialist-realist poetry that emerged in Turkey after the 1960s. His poetry combined themes of love, grief, longing and memory with political resistance and social struggle.

Telli published his first poem in 1961 and his first poetry collection, Yangın Yılları, in 1979. Among his best-known collections are Hüznün İsyan Olur, Dövüşen Anlatsın, Su Çürüdü, Belki Yine Gelirim, Çocuksun Sen and Nidâ.

== Early life and education ==
Telli was born on 2 December 1946 in Eskipazar, which was then part of Çankırı Province and is now in Karabük Province. He was of partial Circassian descent. He attended teacher-training schools in Hasanoğlan and Pazarören.

He later graduated from the Gazi Institute of Education, which was subsequently incorporated into Gazi University. He taught Turkish language and literature in Kastamonu, İnebolu, Doğanyurt and Kırıkkale, and at Ankara Atatürk High School.

== Teaching and publishing career ==
In 1981, during the period of military rule following the 1980 Turkish coup d'état, Telli was arrested and dismissed from his teaching position. He was prosecuted under Articles 141, 142 and 146 of the former Turkish Penal Code. He was acquitted under Articles 141 and 146 but received a short prison sentence under Article 142 for an article he had written about the poetry of the Kurdish poet Cigerxwîn.

After his dismissal, Telli worked as a bookseller, publisher, editor and manager at several publishing houses. He returned to teaching following a court decision in 1993 and retired shortly afterwards.

== Literary career ==
Telli's first poem appeared in the newspaper Hız in 1961. From 1972 onwards, his poems, essays and reviews appeared in literary journals and newspapers including Türk Dili, Varlık, Dönemeç, Oluşum, Damar, Cumhuriyet, Yasakmeyve and Deliler Teknesi. His first poetry collection, Yangın Yılları, was published in 1979.

In 1972 he received second prize in a literary criticism competition organised by the magazine Varlık for an essay on Cengiz Tuncer's novel Kerkenez. During the 1970s, he wrote mainly essays, literary reviews, and book criticism before increasingly concentrating on poetry collections from 1979 onwards.

=== Poetry and style ===
Literary scholars have placed Telli within the second generation of post-1960 Turkish socialist-realist poetry. Bilgin Güngör classifies him as part of a “modernist-socialist” current that combined socialist themes with individual experience, abstract imagery, linguistic experimentation and modern narrative techniques.

Telli's poetry brought together personal suffering and collective struggle. His recurring themes included love, sorrow, longing, exile, friendship, resistance, political memory and hope. Although his poems frequently employ unexpected combinations of words and images, critics have noted that meaning and communicative force generally remain central to his work.

His poetry of the 1970s was characterised by a more militant and confrontational tone. After the political upheaval of 1980, collections such as Saklı Kalan displayed a quieter and more introspective register, while retaining his social and political concerns.

Telli also wrote essays on poetry, language, literature, art and contemporary social issues. His prose collections include Ben Hiçbir Şey Söylemedim, Sulara mı Yazıldı, Buradayım Sözümde and Neylersin.

== Legal proceedings ==
In 2023, the Ankara 26th High Criminal Court sentenced Telli to ten months' imprisonment on a charge of “making propaganda for a terrorist organisation”. The case concerned a speech and a poem from his collection Dövüşen Anlatsın that he had read at a public statement in 2017. The court suspended the sentence.

== Death ==
Telli died on 10 July 2026, at the age of 79. He had been receiving treatment at Ankara Bilkent City Hospital and had been intubated two days before his death. Two days later, he was buried at Karşıyaka Cemetery.

== Works ==
The dates below refer to the original publication of the works rather than later editions.

=== Poetry ===
- Yangın Yılları (1979)
- Hüznün İsyan Olur (1979)
- Dövüşen Anlatsın (1980)
- Saklı Kalan (1981)
- Su Çürüdü (1982)
- Belki Yine Gelirim (1984)
- Çocuksun Sen (1994)
- Kalbim Unut Bu Şiiri (selected poems, 1994)
- Barbar ve Şehlâ (2003)
- Nidâ (2010)
- Bakışın Senin (2016)
- Vedâ Divânı: Toplu Şiirler 1966–2016 (collected poems, 2018)
- Gidersen Yıkılır Bu Kent (selected poems, 2022)
- Arkadaşlık Günleriydi (2023)

=== Prose and interviews ===
- Ben Hiçbir Şey Söylemedim (2001)
- Sulara mı Yazıldı (2001)
- Buradayım Sözümde (2005)
- Neylersin (2013)
- SöyleSen (interviews, 2015)
- Görsen (writings on the visual arts, 2016)
- Dinlersen Anlatırım (2020)

== Awards ==
- 1980 – Ömer Faruk Toprak Poetry Award, for Hüznün İsyan Olur; shared with Metin Altıok
- 1981 – Yazko Poetry Encouragement Award, for Saklı Kalan
- 2011 – Golden Orange Poetry Award, for Nidâ
- 2020 – PEN Turkey Poetry Award
