= Bekir Küçükay =

Turkish classical guitarist

Bekir Küçükay is a Turkish classical guitarist. He is one of the foremost guitarists in Turkey today.

== Life ==
Küçükay was born in 1958 in Ankara. He started his musical life at age 9 on the mandolin. It was not until the age of 16, however, that he made his decision to devote his life to the guitar. Küçükay met Özer Ünal (a celebrated tenor sax player) in 1976 who was also at a turning point in his life and music. Under the influence of Ünal, Küçükay became interested in jazz and devoted himself to classical guitar.

He graduated from Gazi University, Faculty of Music in 1979. After this he completed a Masters Programme at İstanbul State Conservatory and then went on to do a Doctorate at Gazi University. In 1983 he was awarded a prize at the National Competition for Guitar Composition for his work "Monologue". For his performances and recordings of Heitor Villa-Lobos music Küçükay was awarded a medal which was given only 100 artists around the world by the Brazilian Government, to coincide with the 100th Anniversary Celebrations of the composer's birth in 1987.

He has devised his own method for guitar, as an alternative to the traditional ones, and in 1992, published his own method, "A Beginner's Method for Classical Guitar". In 1995 he recorded an album of Turkish Ballads with Ömer Yılmaz, tenor soloist from the Ankara State Opera. In 1999 he was given a prize by Müjdat Gezen Art Center.

Besides broadcasting on radio and appearing on television, he has participated in number of festivals both in his native country and abroad. In addition to giving recitals, he has played all the well-known guitar concertos with Başkent, METU, Mersin and İstanbul Chamber Orchestras; Bursa, Çukurova, İzmir and İstanbul State Symphony Orchestras; Eskişehir Municipality, 9 Eylül University, TRNC and Presidential Symphony Orchestras.

He has been professor of the guitar at İstanbul State Conservatory since 1988.
