= İzmir Democracy University =

Public university in İzmir, Turkey

Coordinates: 38.39357°N 27.07377°E

- İzmir Demokrasi Üniversitesi
- Type: Public university
- Established: 20 August 2016
- President: Prof. Dr: Selim Karahasanoğlu
- Location: İzmir, Turkey
- Campus: Urban / Suburban
- Colors: Orange and dark blue
- Website: Official website

İzmir Democracy University (Turkish: İzmir Demokrasi Üniversitesi) is a public university in İzmir, Turkey. It was established by the Grand National Assembly of Turkey on 20 August 2016 with other 3 new universities. (Note: These are Beykoz University, İstanbul Kent University and İzmir Bakırçay University)

İzmir Democracy University was cited by the press as the successor of İzmir University, which was closed private university by Turkish government on 23 July 2016. But the Council of Higher Education denied it and explained that İzmir Democracy University was not founded in place of İzmir University.

In January 2017, President Recep Tayyip Erdoğan appointed Prof. Dr. Bedriye Tunçsiper as the rector of the university. On June 10, 2020, with a protocol signed with the Ministry of Health, Buca Seyfi Demirsoy Training and Research Hospital started to be used jointly with the university's medical faculty.

== Organization ==
İzmir Democracy University has 10 faculties, 3 institutes and 3 other schools.

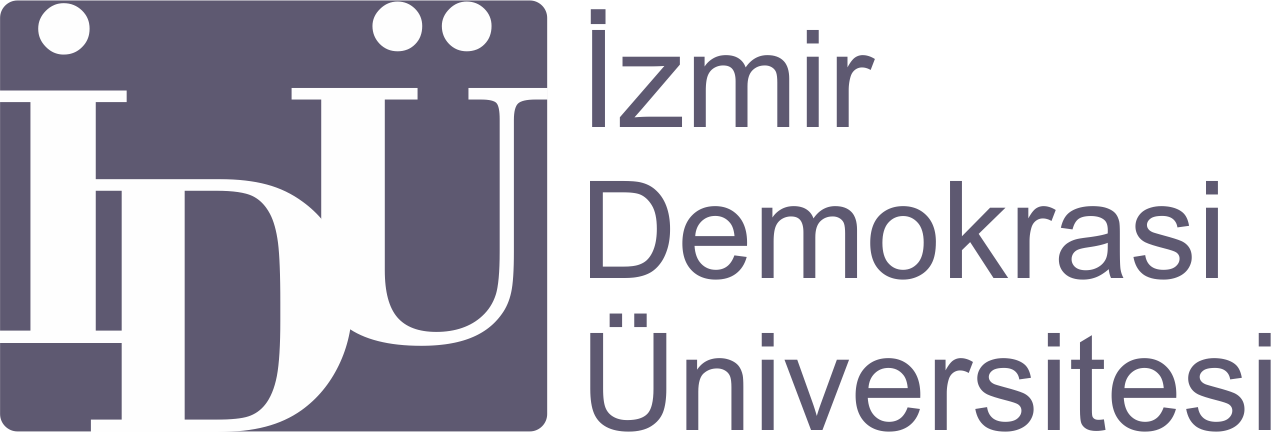
Former logo of the university.

=== Faculties ===
- Faculty of Education
- Faculty of Law
- Faculty of Science and Literature
- Faculty of Administrative and Economic Sciences
- Faculty of Fine Arts
- Faculty of Engineering
- Faculty of Architecture
- Faculty of Medical Sciences
- Faculty of Medicine
- Faculty of Dentistry

=== Institutes ===
- Institute of Graduate Studies in Science and Engineering
- Institute of Social Sciences
- Institute of Medical Sciences

=== Other schools ===
- School of Foreign Languages
- Vocational School of Health Services
- Vocational School
