= Kayhan Erciyeş =

Turkish computer engineer, educator and author

- Born: 30 November 1956 (age 69); İzmir, Turkey
- Spouse: Gülnur Dogana
- Children: 3
- Awards: Great Technical Award, Scientific and Technological Research Council of Turkey (1999); Best Smart Card Application Award, Sesame, Paris (2000); Best Professional Award, Izmir Karsiyaka Rotary Club, (2000)
- Scientific career
- Fields: Computer architecture, Computer networks, Bioinformatics
- Institutions: University of Manchester; University of Salford; Ege University; University of Edinburgh; Oregon State University; University of California, Davis; California State University San Marcos; İzmir University

Kayhan Erciyeş (born 30 November 1956) is a Turkish computer engineer, educator and author. Between 2009 and 2016, he was the rector of İzmir University.

== Biography ==
After receiving the Bachelor of Science degree in Electrical Engineering from the University of Manchester (1979), Kayhan Erciyeş completed the Master of Science degree in Electronic Engineering at the University of Salford (1983) and the Doctor of Philosophy degree in Computer Engineering at Ege University and (partly) at the University of Edinburgh (1989).

He was research assistant (1985–1990), assistant professor, associate professor (1991–1999) and since 1999 professor at Ege University. He was visiting lecturer at Oregon State University (1994–1995), visiting professor at the University of California, Davis (2001) and at California State University San Marcos (2002).

He was the rector of İzmir University from 2009 until 2016, when the university was closed during the 2016–17 purges in Turkey.

In 2016, he supported and helped to organise the distribution of basic survival provisions to some of the worst-off refugees in the area of İzmir.

== Work ==
Kayhan Erciyeş is best known for his research in distributed systems and algorithms, computer networks, with application areas such as mobile networks, wireless sensor networks, grid computing, parallel computing, distributed, real-time and embedded systems, bioinformatics.

In 1983–1984, he was research & development engineer at Alcatel Turkey and in 1990–1991 at Alcatel Portugal. In 1999, he received the Great Technical Award from the Scientific and Technological Research Council of Turkey for his work as consultant and head of the design team in Alcatel Turkey at the project 'New Generation Card Phones and Their Network Management Systems'.

In 1996–1999, he was consultant at Izmir Municipality Transportation System at the development of its Smart Card Application. In 2000, he received for the results of his work on this project the Best Smart Card application in the World 2000 Award by SESAME, Paris and the Karsiyaka Rotary Club Best Professional of the Year 2000 Award.

In 2015, he published the book Distributed and Sequential Algorithms for Bioinformatics, where he presents a unified coverage of bioinformatics topics relating to both biological sequences and biological networks, combining DNA and protein sequence analysis and protein network analysis and offering about 15 new parallel algorithms.

== Books ==
- A Communication Architecture for Mobile Ad hoc Networks: Cluster Based Protocols for Distributed Applications (with Orhan Dagdeviren and Deniz Cokuslu) (2010)
- Topology Control for Mobile Ad hoc Networks: A Dominating Set Based Approach (with Deniz Cokuslu and Orhan Dagdeviren) (2010)
- Distributed Graph Algorithms for Computer Networks (2013)
- Complex Networks: An Algorithmic Perspective (2014)
- Distributed and Sequential Algorithms for Bioinformatics (2015)
- Algebraic Graph Algorithms - A Practical Guide Using Python (2021)
