= İzmir University of Economics =

Private university in İzmir, Turkey

Coordinates: 38°23′18″N 27°02′41″E

- İzmir Ekonomi Üniversitesi
- Motto: Understand with science, manage with knowledge
- Type: Foundation University
- Established: April 14, 2001
- Affiliations: EUA
- Rector: Prof. Dr. Yusuf Hakan Abacıoğlu
- Faculty: 572
- Students: 10.738
- Undergraduates: 7.951 (2023-2024)
- Postgraduates: 601 (2023-2024)
- Doctoral students: 86 (2023-2024)
- Location: İzmir, Turkey
- Campus: City Campus
- Website: www.ieu.edu.tr/en

University rankings

Global – Overall
- THE World: 1501 (2024)
- THE Young Universities: 501 (2024)

Global – Education
- THE Education: 101 (Impact Rankings Quality Education Category 2024)

Regional – Overall
- QS Emerging Europe and Central Asia: 251-300 (2022)

İzmir University of Economics (IEU) is a foundation university located in İzmir, Turkey. Founded on April 14, 2001, the university is the first foundation university of Aegean Region. The medium of instruction is English. With the approval of the Council of Higher Education, it may be decided that education in some units and programs of the university may be provided partially or completely in a language other than Turkish or English.

== History ==
Izmir University of Economics was established by the Izmir Chamber of Commerce Education and Health Foundation pursuant to Law No.4633 published in Official Gazette No. 24373 and dated April 14, 2001. Initially, the university had two faculties, five schools and two graduate schools. On July 1, 2001, upon the suggestion of the then Izmir Metropolitan Municipality Mayor Ahmet Piriştina, it was decided to use the building of the Grand Plaza hotel in Balçova, which has not been used for nine years, by the university. In the first year, 288 students were educated at the university, which was opened as a result of strengthening and renovation works. Classes started on October 22, 2001, and the official opening ceremony was held on October 26, 2001, with the participation of 9th President Süleyman Demirel. On July 27, 2020, a cooperation protocol was signed with Medical Park Izmir Hospital for students of medical and health sciences faculties and vocational school of health services to take their applied courses. Rector Abacıoğlu apologized for the 1915 massacres and called for payment of reparations to Armenia. Great grandfather of Mahmut Özgener, the chairman of the board of trustees, was responsible for the looting and confiscation of Greek properties during the Burning of Symrna. Academician Ümit Kurt received $369,000 grant for writing a book on the late Ottoman genocides.

== Campus ==
Balçova campus is the main campus of the university. Formerly used as a hotel, the building was purchased by the university for $18 million. It is located right across from the Teleferik (Cable Car) in Balçova. The campus, which is adjacent to the forest area, includes the rectorate, all faculties, administrative management and staff, an amphitheater, conference hall and exhibition areas and a student dormitory.

=== Güzelbahçe Campus ===
The second campus of the university will be established on an area of 179,318 m2 in Güzelbahçe.

== Academic Profile ==
Izmir University of Economics has a total of eight faculties, two schools, three vocational schools, a graduate school and twelve research and application centers. There are twenty-four associate, thirty-four undergraduate, twenty-eight master's and seven phD programs throughout the university. While the medium of instruction is completely English in many departments, it is Turkish in some departments. In addition, German, Chinese, French, Spanish, Italian, Japanese and Russian lessons are offered as a second foreign language. As of 2022–2023, the university has 572 faculty members and 10,738 students.

Izmir University of Economics, which has Erasmus agreements with one hundred and sixty-nine universities in twenty-five European countries as of 2023, also has international academic cooperation protocols with fourteen universities in different countries. Through these cooperation agreements, IUE students get the chance to study abroad by taking by taking advantage of international exchange programs.

In IUE, which has an international campus, international students from 52 different countries study at associate, undergraduate, master's and doctoral levels.

Diplomas awarded by IUE have international validity. Graduates can easily continue their education and professional life in the country they want.

== Academic Units ==
=== Faculties ===
There are eight faculties within the university.

==== Faculty of Arts-Science ====
- Physics (English)
- Mathematics (English)
- English Translation and Interpretation
- Psychology (English)
- Sociology (English)

==== Faculty of Fine Arts and Design ====
- Industrial Design (English)
- Visual Communication Design (English)
- Interior Architecture and Environmental Design (English)
- Architecture (English)
- Textile and Fashion Design (English)

==== Faculty of Law ====
- Faculty of Law (Partial/minimum 30% English)

==== Faculty of Communication ====
- Public Relations and Advertisement (English)
- New Media and Communication (English)
- Cinema and Digital Media (English)

==== Faculty of Business ====
- Economics (English)
- Business Administration (English)
- Logistics Management (English)
- Accounting and Auditing (English)
- Political Science and International Relations (English)
- International Trade and Finance (English)

==== Faculty of Engineering ====
- Computer Engineering (English)
- Biomedical Engineering (English)
- Electrical and Electronics Engineering (English)
- Industrial Engineering (English)
- Genetics and Bioengineering (English)
- Aerospace Engineering (English)
- Civil Engineering (English)
- Mechanical Engineering (English)
- Mechatronics Engineering (English)
- Software Engineering (English)

==== Faculty of Health Sciences ====
- Nursing (Turkish)
- Physiotherapy and Rehabilitation (Turkish)

==== Faculty of Medicine ====
- Faculty of Medicine (English)

=== Graduate school ===
Master's and PhD programs are carried out by a single graduate school.

==== Graduate school ====
- Computer Engineering PhD Program (English)
- Electrical-Electronics Engineering PhD Program (English)
- Business Administration PhD Program (English)
- Political Science and International Relations PhD Program (English)
- Design Studies PhD Program (English)
- Experimental Psychology PhD Program (English)
- Applied Mathematics and Statics PhD Program (English)
- Computer Engineering Master's Program with Thesis (English)
- Computer Engineering Master's Program without Thesis (English)
- Bioengineering Master's Program with Thesis (English)
- Surgical Nursing Master's Program with Thesis (Turkish)
- Clinical Psychology Master's Program with Thesis (English)
- Electrical-Electronics Engineering Master's Program with Thesis (English)
- Electrical-Electronics Engineering Master's Program without Thesis (English)
- Industrial Engineering Master's Program with Thesis (English)
- Financial Economics Master's Program with Thesis (English)
- Financial Economics Master's Program without Thesis (English)
- Distance Learning MBA without Thesis (Turkish)
- Distance Learning MBA without Thesis (English)
- MBA with Thesis (English)
- Logistics Management Master's Program with Thesis (English)
- Logistics Management Master's Program without Thesis (English)
- Clinical Psychology Master's Program with Thesis (English)
- Brand Communication Master's Program without Thesis (Turkish)
- Architecture Master's Program with Thesis (English)
- Private Law Master's Program with Thesis (Turkish)
- Private Law Master's Program without Thesis (Turkish)
- Public Law Master's Program with Thesis (Turkish)
- Public Law Master's Program without Thesis (Turkish)
- Marketing Communications and Public Relations Master's Program with Thesis (English)
- Political Science and International Relations Master's Program with Thesis (English)
- Sustainable Energy Master's Program with Thesis (English)
- Sustainable Energy Master's Program without Thesis (English)
- Design Studies Master's Program with Thesis (English)
- Executive MBA without Thesis (Turkish)

=== Vocational Schools and Schools ===
There are three vocational schools and two schools within the university.

==== Vocational School of Justice ====
- Justice (Turkish)

==== Vocational School ====
- Banking and Insurance (Turkish)
- Computer Programming (Turkish)
- Computer Programming (EE) (Turkish)
- Foreign Trade (Turkish)
- Graphics Design (Turkish)
- Graphics Design (EE) (Turkish)
- Interior Design (Turkish)
- Construction Technology (Turkish)
- Occupational Health and Safety (Turkish)
- Architectural Restoration (Turkish)
- Radio and Television Programming (Turkish)
- Civil Aviation Transportation Management (Turkish)
- Civil Aviation Cabin Services (Turkish)
- Tourism and Hotel Management (Turkish)
- Applied English Translation (English)

==== Vocational School of Health Sciences ====
- Child Development (Turkish)
- Physiotheraphy (Turkish)
- Paramedic (Turkish)
- Opticianry (Turkish)
- Medical Documentation and Secretariat (Turkish)
- Medical Imaging Techniques (Turkish)
- Medical Laboratory Techniques (Turkish)
- Elderly Care (Turkish)

==== School of Applied Management Sciences ====
- Gastronomy and Culinary Arts (English)

==== School of Foreign Languages ====
- Second Foreign Language Program (German, Chinese, French, Spanish, Italian, Japanese, Russian)
- English Preparatory Program
- Undergraduate English Program
- Associate English Program

=== Research and Application Centers ===
- Teaching and Learning Center (EKOEĞİTİM)
- Creative Economy Research and Application Center (İEU-KREA)
- Gender and Women's Studies Research and Application Center (EKOKAM)
- Continuing Education Center (EKOSEM)
- Innovative Entrepreneurship Research and Application Center (EKOGİRİŞİM)
- Design Research and Application Center (EKOTAM)
- Psychology Research and Application Center
- Health Research and Application Center
- Leadership And Governance Research and Application Center (EKOLİDER)
- European Union Research and Application Center (EKOAB)
- Children's University Research and Application Center

== Student life ==
=== Clubs and communities ===
As of the 2020–2021 academic year, 73 Student Clubs operate at the university. In addition to these, there are Men's Basketball, Women's Basketball, Men's Tennis, Women's Tennis, Women's Volleyball, American Football, Chess and Sailing teams.

== See also ==
- List of universities in İzmir
