= Horizon Science Academy- Cincinnati =

Coordinates: 39°10′39″N 84°28′52″W

The Horizon Science Academy of Cincinnati is a public K-8 charter school that provides its students with an education emphasizing math, science, and technology

HSAC is managed by Concept Schools a not-for-profit charter management organization that manages charter schools in the Midwest.

The school opened in April 2005, in the former building of South East Ohio College at 1055 Laidlaw Ave, Cincinnati, Ohio, with authorization from the Educational Service Center of Lake Erie West. In the 2012–13 school year, it enrolled 500 students with a student/teacher ratio of 11/1

In June 2014, the school was raided by the FBI for evidence related to Concept Schools' alleged improper relationships with technology vendors.
