= Tarık Daşgün =

Turkish footballer and manager

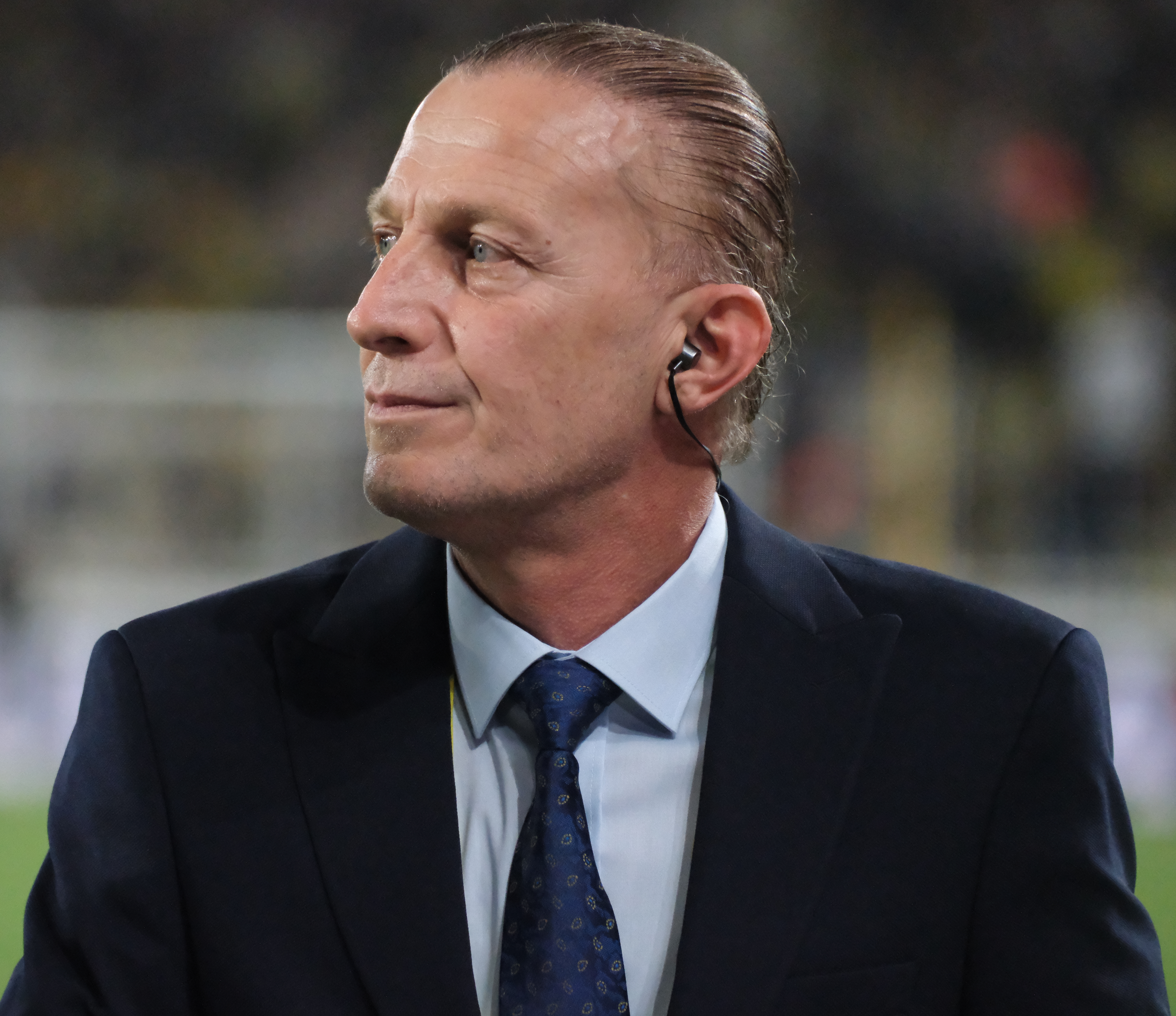

Personal information
- Date of birth: 26 August 1973 (age 53)
- Place of birth: Ankara, Turkey
- Height: 1.81 m (5 ft 11 in)
- Position: Midfielder

Youth career
- Gençlerbirliği

Senior career*
Years	Team	Apps	(Gls)
1992–1995	Gençlerbirliği		
1993	→ Turgutluspor (loan)		
1995–1997	Fenerbahçe		
1998–1999	Kocaelispor		
1999–2000	Ankaragücü		
2000–2001	Yimpaş Yozgatspor		
2001–2002	Gençlerbirliği		
2002	Sakaryaspor		
2004	Karabükspor		
2005	Yimpaş Yozgatspor		

International career
1995–1998	Turkey	2	(0)

Managerial career
- 2009–2010: Gençlerbirliği (youth)
- 2010–2011: Gençlerbirliği II (assistant)
- 2011–2013: Hacettepe
- 2014–2015: Van BB
- 2016: Aydınspor
- 2016–2017: Gümüşhanespor
- 2017: Kastamonuspor
- 2018: BB Bodrumspor
- 2018–2019: Fethiyespor
- 2020: BB Bodrumspor
- * Club domestic league appearances and goals

Tarık Daşgün (born 26 August 1973 in Ankara) is a Turkish football manager and former player. In 2005 he was found guilty of doping.

== Club career ==
He played for Gençlerbirliği S.K., Fenerbahçe S.K., Kocaelispor, Ankaragücü and Yimpaş Yozgatspor in the Turkish Süper Lig, appearing in more than 180 league matches and scoring 40 goals.

In 2005 he was found guilty of doping.

He also played for Tokatspor and retired from football at Belediye Bingölspor in 2007.

== International career ==
Daşgün made two appearances for the full Turkey national football team, his debut coming in a friendly against Chile on 22 June 1995.

== Personal ==
He graduated from Gazi University.
