= Gazi University =

Public university located in Ankara, Turkey

Coordinates: 39°56′12″N 32°49′20″E

- Gazi Üniversitesi
- Former name: Gazi Eğitim Enstitüsü (1926-1980)
- Motto: Gazili olmak ayrıcalıktır. (Turkish)
- Motto in English: Being a member of Gazi is a privilege.
- Type: Public research university
- Established: 1926; 100 years ago
- Founder: Mustafa Kemal Atatürk
- Affiliations: EUA
- Rector: Uğur Ünal
- Undergraduates: 32,595
- Postgraduates: 11,428
- Location: Ankara, Turkey
- Campus: Urban
- Language: Turkish, English
- Website: gazi.edu.tr

University rankings

Global – Overall
- QS World: 901-950 (2026)

Regional – Overall
- QS Emerging Europe and Central Asia: 71 (2022)

Gazi University (Turkish: Gazi Üniversitesi) is a public research university located primarily in Ankara, Turkey. It was founded in 1926 by Mustafa Kemal Atatürk originally as the Gazi Education Institute (Turkish: Gazi Eğitim Enstitüsü), has evolved into a comprehensive institution. The university comprises 21 faculties, 4 schools, 11 vocational schools of higher education, 52 research centers, and 7 graduate institutes. As of the latest data, the total student population is approximately 77,000, with around 1,500 students originating from the Turkic states of Central Asia. Additionally, 5,000 students are engaged in various graduate programs. The university employs over 3,000 faculty members, contributing to its extensive academic community.

== Campus ==
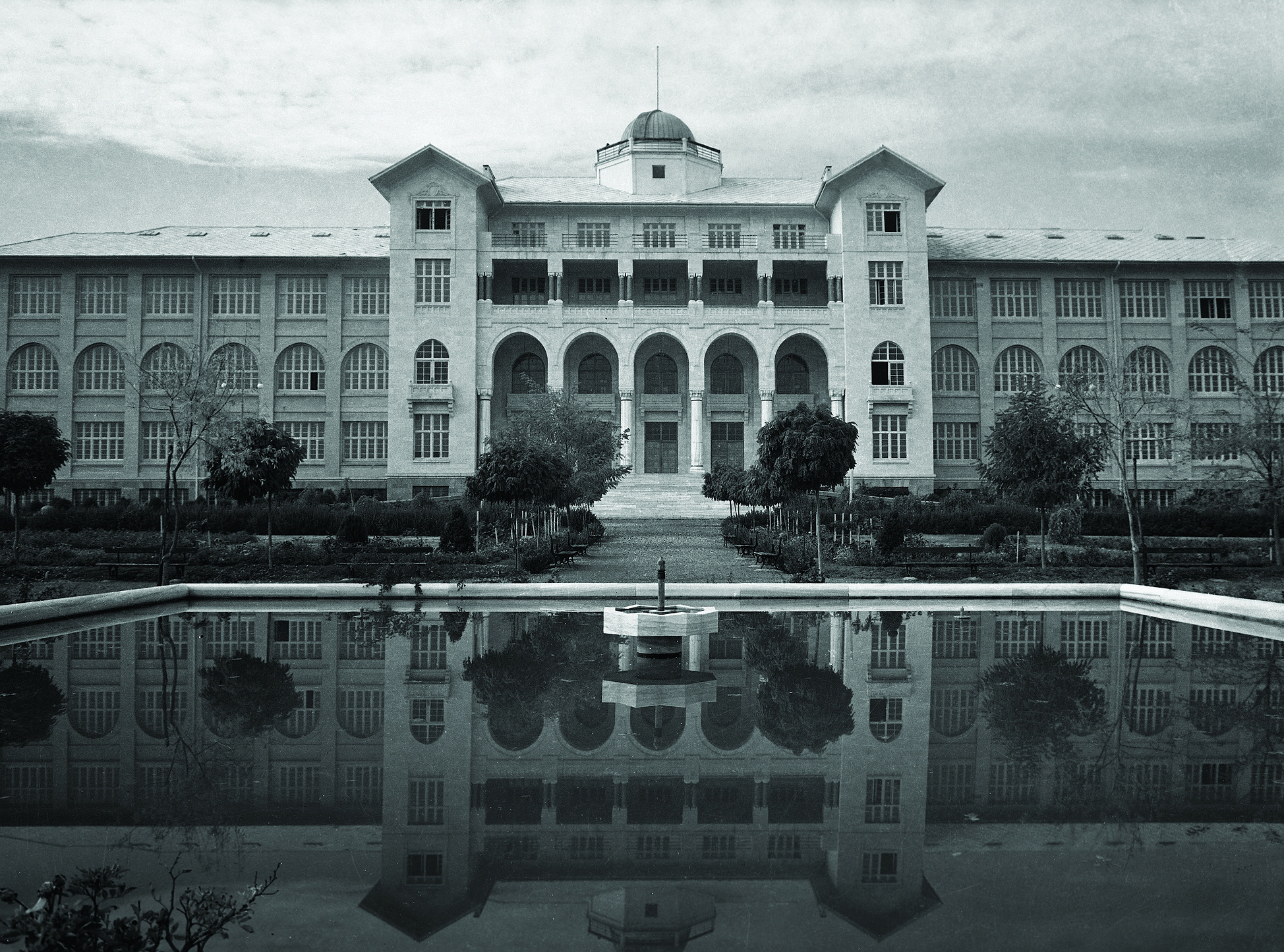
Gazi University, Faculty of Education

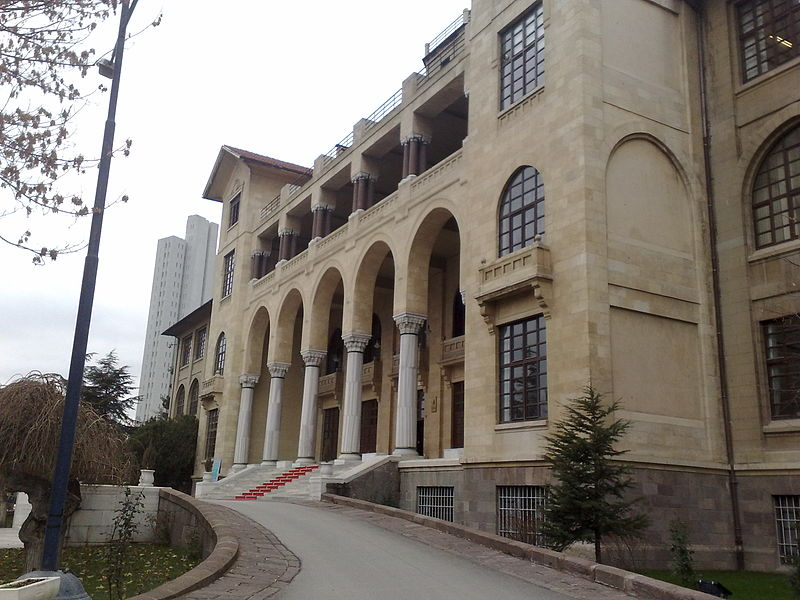
Gazi University's Entrance Gate

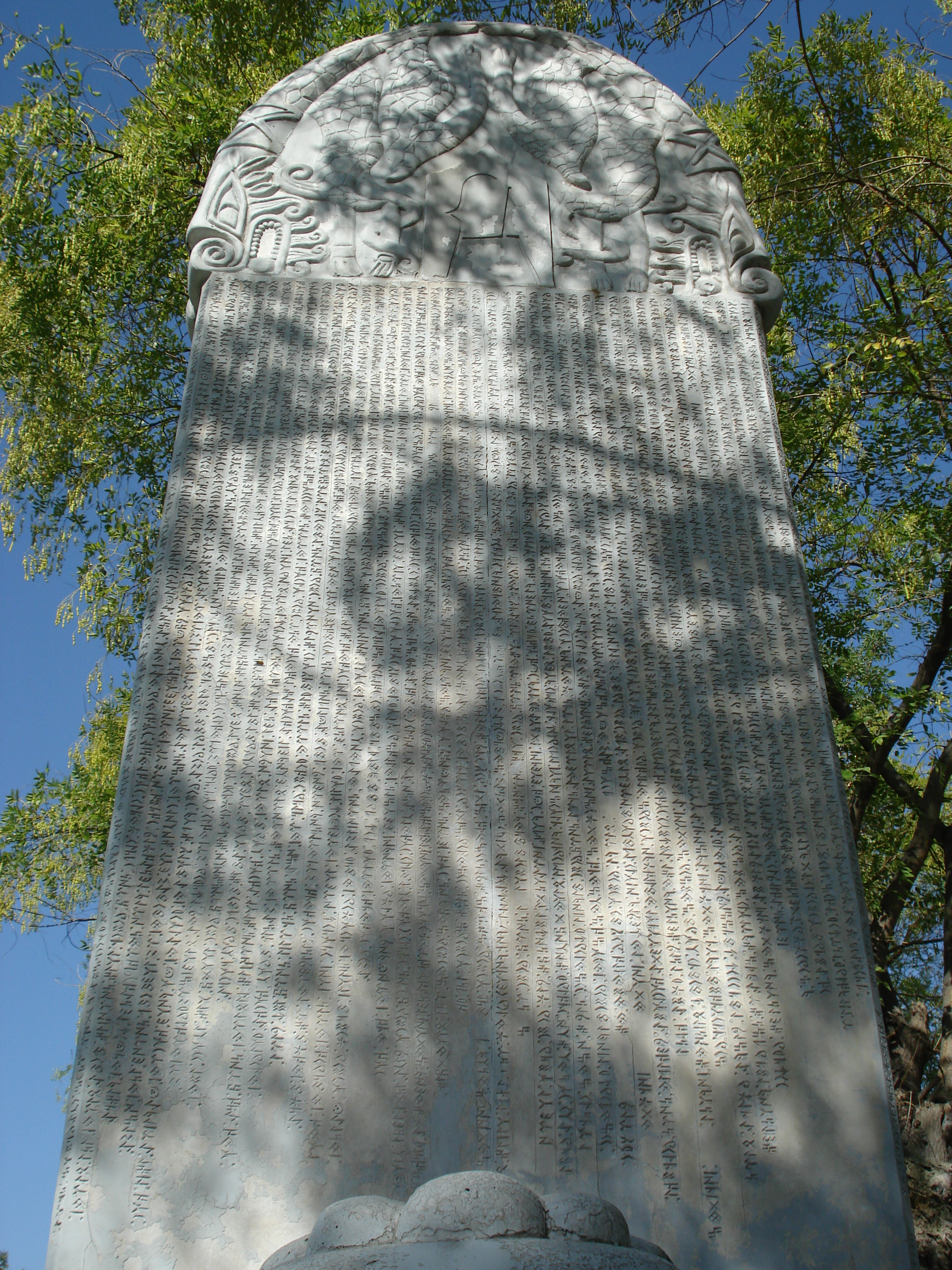
Replica of Bilge Qaghan's memorial complex at the university campus

Gazi University operates as a city-university with multiple campuses throughout the capital, with its main campus in Beşevler. Its urban setting facilitates access to housing and shopping centers for students. The university offers a variety of student activities, including a Spring Festival, free and opening concerts, sports tournaments, theatre productions, performances by student clubs, and numerous scientific and cultural seminars.

In 1982, the university expanded significantly by merging with several institutions: the Bolu Academy of Engineering and Architecture, Ankara Academy of Economics and Commercial Sciences, Ankara College of Technical Careers, Ankara Girls' College of Technical Careers, and the Ankara State Academy of Engineering and Architecture. This reorganization was part of a broader educational reform under the act that established the Board of Higher Education. Prior to this reform, higher education institutions in Turkey were organized as universities, academies, institutes, and schools. In 1992, the faculties and vocational schools located in Bolu were reconstituted to form Abant Izzet Baysal University.

== Organisation ==
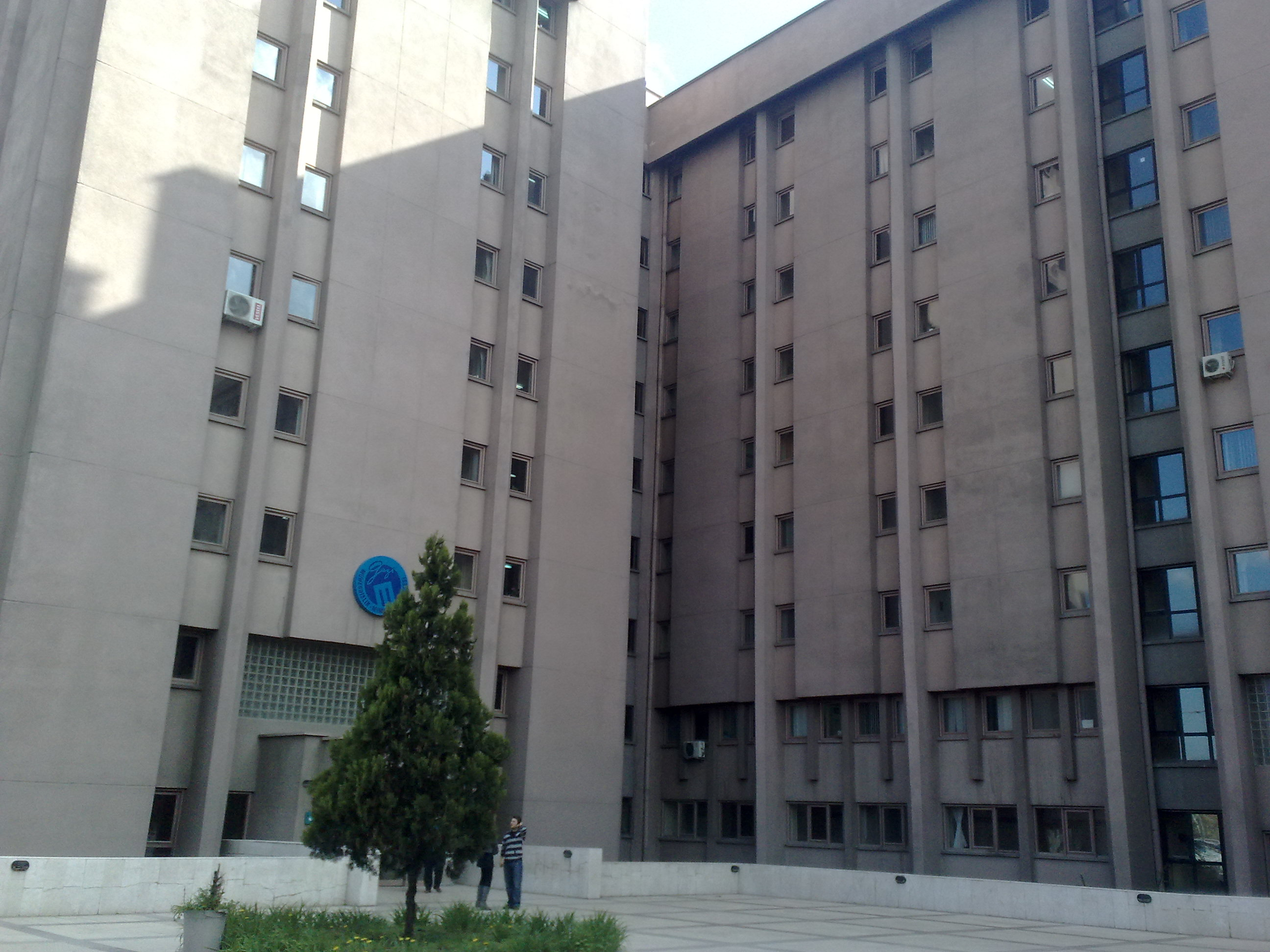
Gazi University Faculty of Engineering

=== Faculties ===
- Faculty of Architecture
- Faculty of Dentistry
- Faculty of Engineering
- Faculty of Fine Arts
- Faculty of Health Sciences
- Faculty of Medicine
- Faculty of Pharmacy
- Faculty of Sciences
- Faculty of Technical Education
- Faculty of Technology
- Gazi Faculty of Education
- Industrial Arts Education Faculty

Some former faculties have been separated from Gazi University. They are now operating under AHBV University.

=== Graduate Schools ===
- Graduate School of Educational Sciences
- Graduate School of Fine Arts
- Graduate School of Health Sciences
- Graduate School of Informatics
- Graduate School of Research and Prevention of Accidents
- Graduate School of Sciences
- Graduate School of Social Sciences

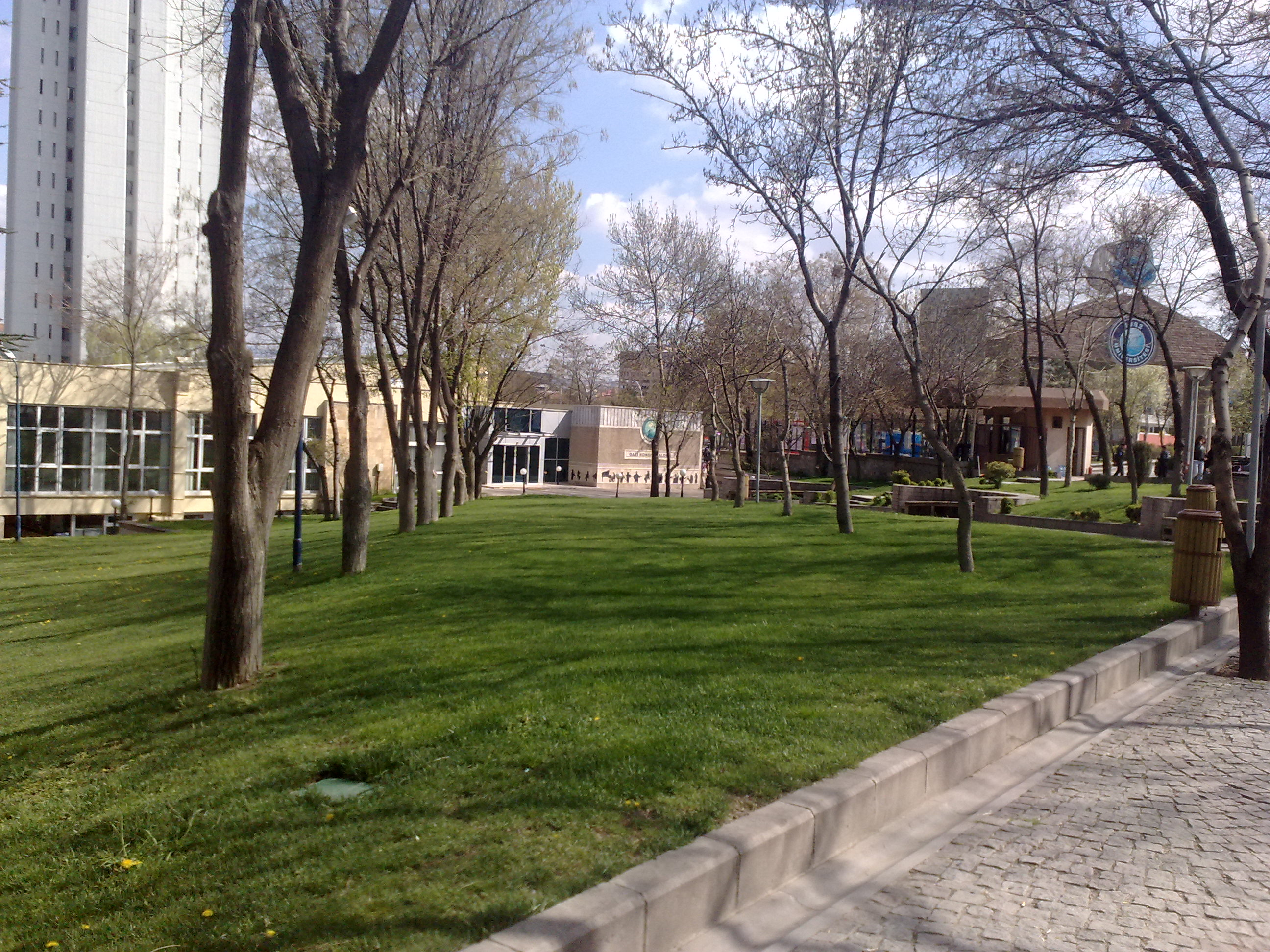
University Campus

=== Schools ===
- School of Banking and Insurance
- School of Foreign Languages
- School of Land Registry and Cadastre
- School of Physical Education and Sport

=== Vocational Schools ===
- Ankara Vocational School
- Atatürk Vocational School
- Beypazari Technical Sciences Vocational School
- Distance Education/Learning Vocational School
- Gazi Vocational School
- Ostim Vocational School
- Polatlı Vocational School of Social Sciences
- Vocational School of Health Services
- Vacational School of Land Registry and Cadastre
- Vocational School of Law
- Vocational School of Public Finance

== Gazi University Central Library ==
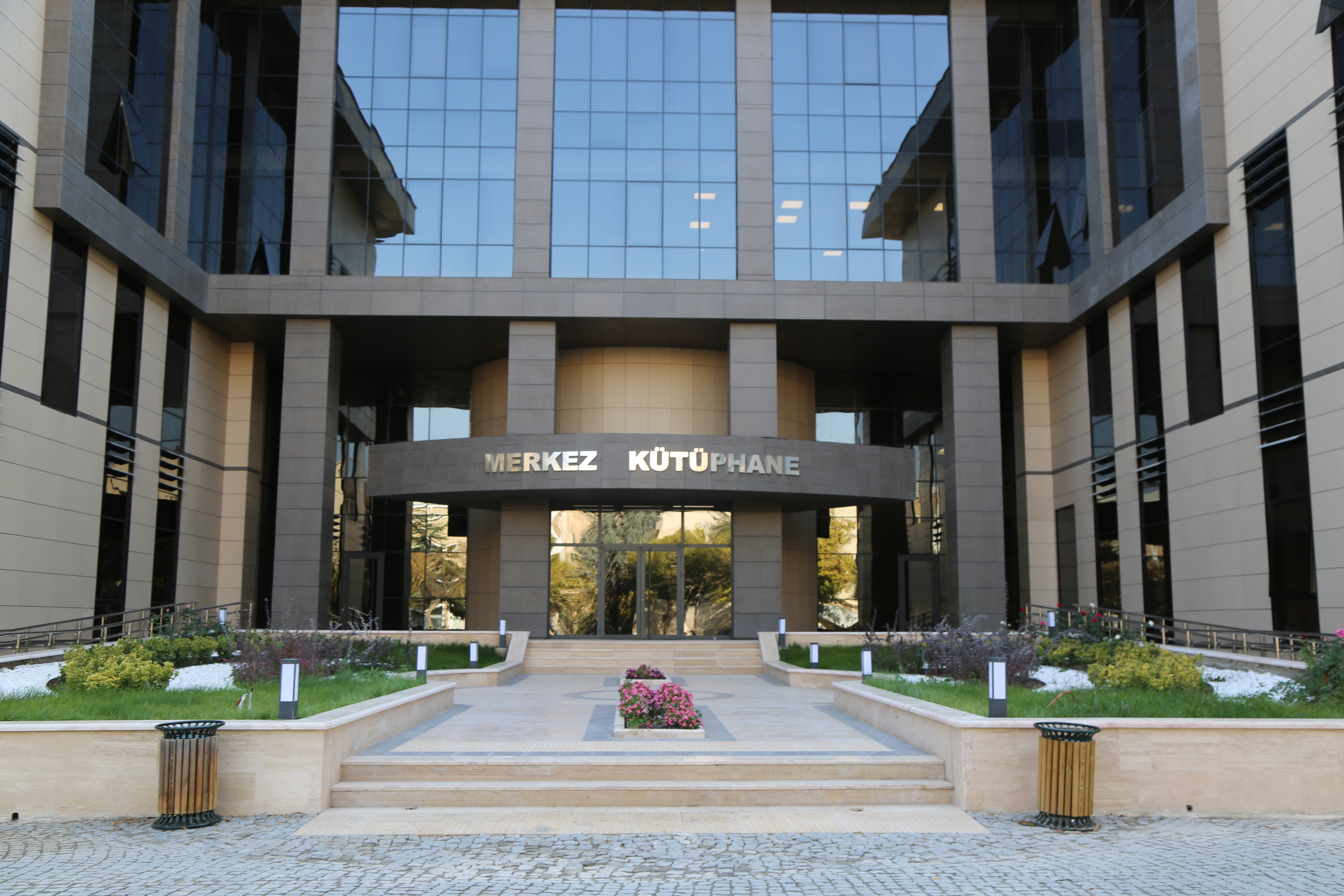
Gazi University Main Library

Gazi University's library houses a substantial collection of resources, including 150,000 books, 62,000 bound periodicals, and 10,000 master's theses. The library offers subscriptions to 700 periodicals in foreign languages and 600 in Turkish. Additionally, it provides access to 20,000 online journals and 30 online databases. The collections primarily feature materials in Turkish, English, and German. To assist new students, the library organizes orientation programs that introduce them to the available resources and services.

== Rankings ==
Gazi University has received several rankings from various organizations. In 2021, the University Ranking by Academic Performance (URAP) placed Gazi 6th among Turkish universities and 4th in Turkey for the subjects of 'Engineering' and 'Technology.' The Center for World University Rankings (CWUR) ranked Gazi 844th in the 2022 global university rankings. In the QS World University Rankings, Gazi University was placed in the 801-1000 category in 2021, 901-950 in 2026, while in 2022, it ranked 21st worldwide in the subject of education and 1st in Turkey. It held the rank of 401 in QS's 2025 Global Engineering listing. It was ranked as the 11th best university in Turkey by QS's 2026 Turkish University ranking.

== Achievements ==
Turkey's third face transplant, specifically a partial face transplant, was conducted on March 17, 2012. The procedure was performed at the hospital of Gazi University on Hatice Nergis, a twenty-year-old woman from Kahramanmaraş. The patient had lost her upper jaw six years earlier, including her mouth, lips, palate, teeth, and nasal cavity due to a firearm accident, rendering her unable to eat. Prior to the transplant, she had undergone approximately 35 reconstructive plastic surgeries. The surgery was led by surgeon Selahattin Özmen. The donor was a 28-year-old woman from Istanbul who had committed suicide.

== Notable alumni ==
- Abbas Güçlü — Journalist, writer, TV host, and educator
- Abdullatif Sener — Former Deputy Prime Minister and finance minister and former founder of Turkey Party
- Adnan Binyazar — Author, critic and educator
- Ahmet Telli — Writer and educator
- Ali Palabıyık — Football referee and teacher
- Aziz Yıldırım — Businessman, civil engineer and former president of Fenerbahçe Sports Club
- Bekir Küçükay — Guitar player
- Biket İlhan — Cinema producer, director, founder of Sinevizyon film company and director
- Bülent Bezdüz — Turkish State Opera and Ballet lead soloist, 2 Grammy award-winning musician
- Cemil Demirbakan — Musician and former soloist of the Yüksek Sadakat group
- Çiğdem Batur — Actor, voice actor and presenter
- Devlet Bahçeli — Politician, economist, Milliyetçi Hareket Partisi leader and former deputy prime minister
- Elçin Sevgi Suçin — Poet, writer, and literary critic
- Emin Özdemir — Academic, linguist and literary researcher
- Erman Toroğlu — Former football player, football commentator
- Fakir Baykurt — Author, trade unionist
- Fatih Uraz — Manager and former professional football player
- Ferman Akgül — Rock artist, soloist of the MaNga band
- Fikret Bila — Journalist, presenter, former TCA auditor
- Hasan Hüseyin Korkmazgil — Poet and humorous story writer
- İbrahim Melih Gökçek — Former Ankara Mayor and journalist
- İlhan Berk — Poet, translator, writer and teacher
- İnci Aral — Story and novel writer
- İsmail Altınok — Painter, writer and instructor
- İsmail Küçükkaya — Journalist, news presenter and writer
- Kamer Genç — Deputy of Republican People's Party and former Council of State Prosecutor
- Kemal Kılıçdaroğlu — Bureaucrat, former leader of the Republican People's Party
- Kemal Unakıtan — Former Minister of Finance
- Kenan Işık — Actor, presenter, main news presenter and former journalist
- Metin Yurdanur — Sculptor
- Mustafa Balel — Translator, story and novel writer
- Mustafa Erdoğan — Artistic director, journalist
- M. Rifat Hisarcıklıoğlu — President of the Union of Chambers and Commodity Exchanges of Turkey
- Naim Süleymanoğlu — Professional weightlifter
- Nihat Özdemir — Turkish businessman, former president of the Turkish Football Federation and Limak Holding CEO
- Nurcan Taylan — Olympic champion weightlifter
- Ömer Çelik — Politician, journalists, former Minister of Turkey and the European Union and former Culture and Tourism Minister
- Özdemir İnce — Poet, writer and journalist
- Rıfat Ilgaz — Poet, novelist and story writer
- Sina Koloğlu — Keyboardist of Bulutsuzluk Özlemi and critic
- Sinan Şamil Sam — Professional boxer
- Suphi Varer — Laz football coach and manager
- Süleyman Saim Tekcan — Painter, film actor, sculptor, printmaker, graphic artist, engraver and academic
- Şeref Eroğlu — Professional wrestler
- Tahsin Saraç — Poet and one of the Teachers' Union of Turkey founder
- Tarık Daşgün — Manager and former national football player
- Tuncay Özkan — Republican People's Party deputy chairperson, journalist, writer and broadcaster
- Yusuf Dikeç – Olympic sport shooter
- Zafer Çağlayan — Turkish politician and former minister and former vice-president of TOBB
- Zekai Tunca — Turkish classical music artist

== Notable faculty ==
- Atilla Yayla — political scientist and academic
- Emrullah İşler — professor of Arabic language, former Deputy Prime Minister of Turkey, ambassador
- Mehmet Hakkı Suçin — professor of Arabic language and literature, and literary translator
- Naci Kınacıoğlu — jurist, academic and former Minister of Transport
- Ziya Selçuk — educator, academic and former Minister of National Education

== See also ==
- List of universities in Ankara
- List of universities in Turkey
