= Ankara Music and Fine Arts University =

Turkish public university

- Ankara Müzik ve Güzel Sanatlar Üniversitesi
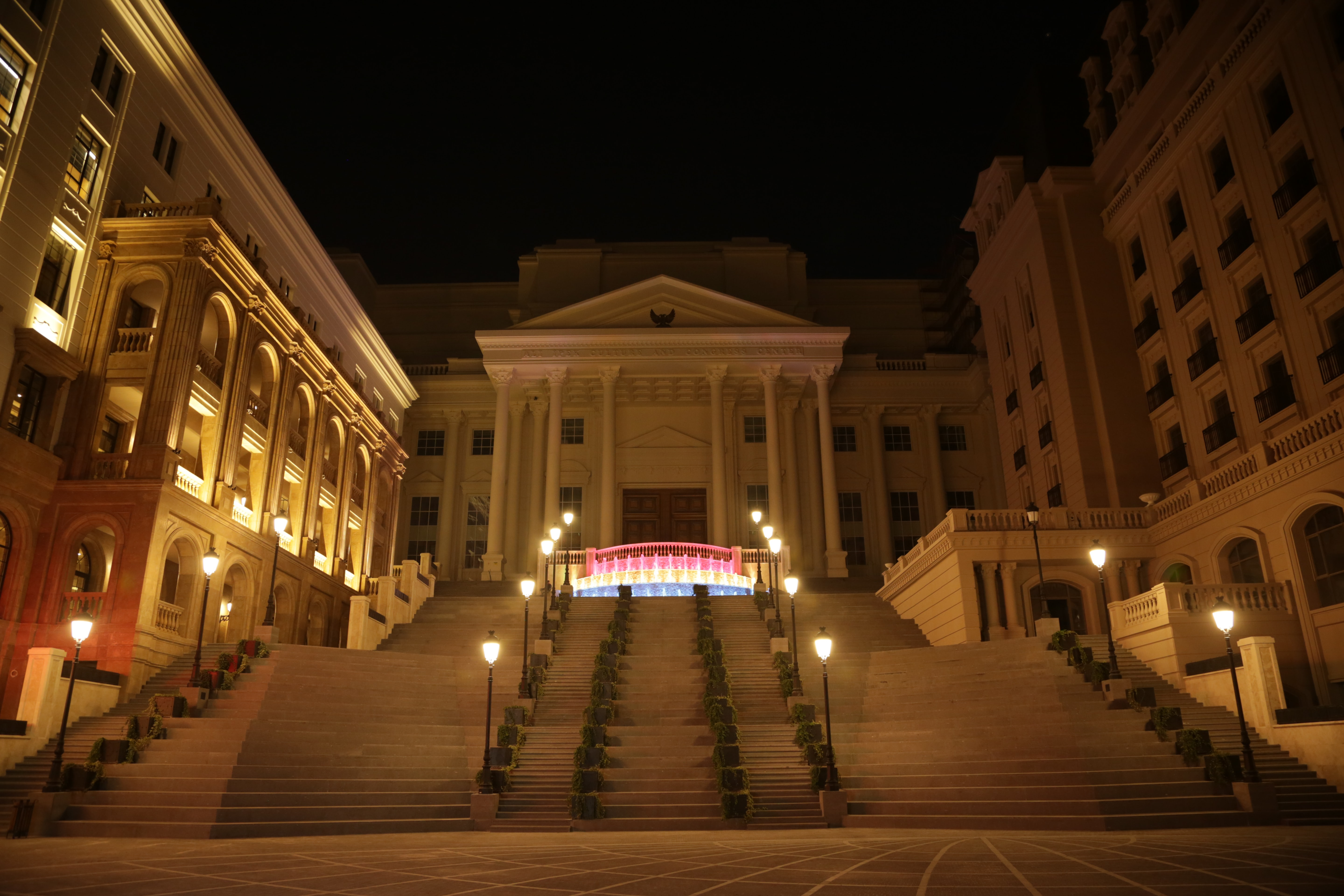
- Ankara Music and Fine Arts University Main Building
- Type: Public
- Established: 2017
- Address: Neşet Ertaş Street No:4 06550 Oran Çankaya, Ankara, Turkey; 39.85724°N 32.84582°E
- Website: www.mgu.edu.tr

Ankara Music and Fine Arts University (Turkish: Ankara Müzik ve Güzel Sanatlar Üniversitesi) is a public university located in Ankara, Turkey. It was established on 1 July 2017. The university specializes specifically in arts and music education, offering academic programs through 4 faculties, 1 institute, and 1 vocational school. It holds the distinction of being Turkey's first higher education institution with a full thematic focus on music.

== History ==
Ankara Music and Fine Arts University was founded under Law No. 7033, which was published in the Official Gazette of the Republic of Turkey (numbered 3011) on 1 July 2017.

== Academics ==
The university offers various undergraduate and graduate programs focused on fine arts and musicology.

=== Institutes ===
- Institute of Music and Fine Arts

=== Faculties ===
The university comprises the following faculties:

- Faculty of Music Sciences and Technologies
- Faculty of Performing Arts
- Faculty of Music and Fine Arts Education
- Faculty of Art and Design

=== Vocational schools ===
- Vocational School of Music and Fine Arts

== Campus ==
The university campus is located in the Oran neighborhood of the Çankaya district. It covers a closed area of 23,600 m^{2} (254,000 sq ft) and has a total area of 54,462 m^{2} (586,220 sq ft).

Facilities include:

- A guesthouse with a total usage area of 16,741 m^{2} (180,200 sq ft).
- Two refectories.
- A 4-storey library.
- A cafeteria.

== See also ==
- List of universities in Ankara
- Music of Turkey
