= Ankara Hacı Bayram Veli University =

Turkish public university located in Ankara

Coordinates: 39°56′30″N 32°49′8″E

- Ankara Hacı Bayram Veli Üniversitesi
- Other names: HBV
- Motto: İlim Kapısı
- Motto in English: Door of Science
- Type: Public University
- Established: May 18th, 2018 (Separation from Gazi University by law)
- Rector: Prof. Dr. Mehmet Naci Bostancı
- Undergraduates: 19.243
- Postgraduates: 1.921
- Location: Ankara, Turkey
- Campus: Urban, Central Campus, Beşevler Campus, Gölbaşı Campus, Polatlı Campus
- Colors: Red & white
- Website: hacibayram.edu.tr?language=en_US

Ankara Hacı Bayram Veli University, shortened HBV, is a public university in Turkey which was formed on 18 May 2018 by the separation from Gazi University. Some faculties which have been separated from Gazi University in accordance with the law no 7141 such as Gazi University Faculty of Law, Faculty of Economics and Administrative Sciences, Faculty of Letters have been become a part of newly established Ankara Hacı Bayram Veli University. The Besevler Campus is located in the city center of Ankara, the capital city of Turkey. Besevler Campus, which has the Faculty of Law and Faculty of Economics and Administrative Sciences, has graduated many famous people who are active in Turkish politics. Kemal Kılıçdaroğlu of the Republican People's Party, the leader of the main opposition party in the Turkish Grand National Assembly, and Devlet Bahçeli, the leader of the Nationalist Movement Party, have graduated from the aforementioned Faculty of Economics and Administrative Sciences.

The university was named after Hacı Bayram Veli, an Ottoman Turkish poet and Sufi saint.

Ankara Hacı Bayram Veli University has 10 faculties, 1 institute, 2 colleges, 4 vocational schools, 1 state conservatory and, 26 research centers.

== List of Faculties ==
- Faculty of Letters
- Faculty of Law
- Faculty of Divinity
- Faculty of Tourism
- Faculty of Financial Sciences
- Faculty of Economics and Administrative Sciences
- Polatlı Faculty of Sciences and Letters
- Faculty of Fine Arts
- Faculty of Communication
- Faculty of Arts and Design

== See also ==
- List of universities in Ankara
- List of universities in Turkey
