= Concept Schools =

US nonprofit organization

- Formation: 1999; 27 years ago
- Type: 501(c)(3)
- Tax ID no.: 03-0503751
- Headquarters: Schaumburg, Illinois
- Region served: Midwestern United States
- Services: Charter school management
- CEO: Sedat Duman
- Revenue: $66,205,592 (FY2022–23)
- Staff: 80
- Website: www.conceptschools.org

Concept Schools is a nonprofit charter school management company.

The group currently operates or manages thirty five tuition-free science, technology and math-focused schools in seven Midwest states. Serving more than 14,000 students, Concept-managed schools are located in urban areas in Ohio, Illinois, Indiana, Iowa, Michigan, Minnesota, and Missouri. Out of roughly 14,000 students, 86% are minority students and 85% come from economically disadvantaged families.

Beginning with the 2013–2014 school year, Concept Schools is the charter operator for Horizon Science Academy McKinley Park, Horizon Science Academy Belmont, and Horizon Science Academy Southwest Chicago. The concept entered into a management agreement with local school boards to provide operational and academic services to manage an additional 32 charter public schools.

School Governance is the responsibility of the Board of Directors of each school. Each Board is the charter holder and is held accountable by a charter authorizer. Each Board provides oversight and accountability in the management of the school, including financial oversight exercised by a review of financial updates at each Board meeting.

== Ohio schools ==
In 2009, Horizon Science Academy Cleveland received a National Blue Ribbon Award from the US Department of education. Three years later, the Horizon Science Academy High School in Columbus received a National Blue Ribbon as well. In 2014, Concept Schools in Ohio and two other states were served search warrants alleging embezzlement of federal grants, though no criminal charges were filed by 2016. In March 2020, the Ohio Auditor of State reported that 14 institutions run by Concept Schools in Ohio had clean audit records. Schools with "clean" audit reports submit financial reports did not contain any findings for recovery, material citations, material weaknesses, significant deficiencies, Uniform Guidance findings or questioned costs. Two of those schools—HSA Denison Middle School and HSA Columbus Middle School—were awarded the 2019 Momentum Award by the Ohio Department of Education. The Momentum Award recognizes institutions that exceeded expectations for learning outcomes of for students in certain demographics.

== In the media ==
In 2014, schools run by Concept in three states were raided by the FBI. In total, nineteen search warrants were executed by the FBI on June 4, 2014.

=== School openings ===
In 2014, Chicago Public Schools CEO Barbara Byrd-Bennett prohibited the opening of a Concept School in Chicago due to visible mold, water-damaged floors, damaged ceilings, and asbestos.

=== E-Rate investigation background ===
In June 2014, the Federal Bureau of Investigation, Department of Education, and Federal Communications Commission conducted joint raids on Concept Schools and several Concept network schools in Illinois, Indiana, and Ohio for "allegations of white collar crime," according to FBI spokesperson Vicki Anderson. The raids were in connection with E-Rate, which provides discounted technology resources to schools, and alleged that Concept Schools diverted $5 million of federal grants away from schools. As of August 2016, no charges have been filed.

=== E-Rate investigation resolution, October 2020 ===
Concept Schools resolved federal investigation related to the E-Rate Technology Program.

Following an investigation lasting more than six years, Concept Schools and the Federal Government reached an agreement concluding the matter without any determination of wrongdoing by Concept Schools, Concept network schools, or any Concept or school representative. Further, no criminal or civil action was filed in connection with this matter.

As a part of this resolution, Concept Schools also entered into a compliance agreement with the Federal Communications Commission.

The Department of Justice, the Federal Bureau of Investigation, and the Department of Education Office of Inspector General began an investigation more than six years ago into Concept Schools and several Concept-network schools related to funds certain network schools received under the federal “E-Rate Program” to improve technology access in their schools.

As soon as Concept Schools became aware of the investigation, it cooperated fully with the government agencies, and it continued to cooperate throughout the investigation. As a part of the investigation, multiple agencies closely reviewed a number of Concept's operations, practices, and functions. Concept Schools values the insights gained over the past six years and looks forward to moving ahead with its core educational mission.

Per the United States Department of Justice, the claims resolved by the settlement are allegations only, and there has been no determination of liability.

== List of schools ==
Chicago Region

- Chicago Math and Science Academy
- Horizon Science Academy- McKinley Park
- Horizon Science Academy- Belmont Elementary
- Horizon Science Academy - Belmont High School
- Horizon Science Academy- Southwest Chicago

St. Louis Region

- Gateway Science Academy - Smiley
- Gateway Science Academy - South
- Gateway Science Academy - Fyler High School (Grades 9-10)
- Gateway Science Academy - Fyler High School (Grades 11-12)
- Gateway Science Academy - Middle School

Ohio

- Horizon Science Academy- Cincinnati
- Horizon Science Academy- Columbus Primary School
- Horizon Science Academy- Columbus Elementary School
- Horizon Science Academy- Columbus Middle School
- Horizon Science Academy- Columbus High School (Grades 9-10)
- Horizon Science Academy- Columbus High School (Grades 11-12)
- Noble Academy Columbus
- Horizon Science Academy- Dayton Elementary School
- Horizon Science Academy- Dayton High School
- Horizon Science Academy- Dayton Downtown
- Horizon Science Academy- Cleveland Middle School
- Horizon Science Academy- Cleveland High School
- Horizon Science Academy- Denison School
- Horizon Science Academy- Lorain
- Horizon Science Academy- Springfield
- Horizon Science Academy- Toledo
- Horizon Science Academy- Youngstown
- Horizon Science Academy-Austintown
- Noble Academy Cleveland

Indianapolis Region

- Indiana Math & Science Academy - West
- Indiana Math & Science Academy - North

Michigan

- Michigan Math & Science Academy - Dequindre
- Michigan Math & Science Academy - Lorraine

Minnesota

- Minnesota Math and Science Academy
- Horizon Science Academy - Twin Cities
