= Beehive Science and Technology Academy =

Location
- 830 E 9400 S Sandy, Utah; United States; 40.5785°N 111.8702°W

Information
- Type: Charter
- Established: 2005
- Authorizer: Utah State Charter School Board
- Director: Hanifi Oguz
- Teaching staff: 21.06 (FTE)
- Grades: K to 12
- Enrollment: 402 (2023-2024)
- Student to teacher ratio: 19.09
- Colors: Gold yellow, black
- Mascot: Bee circling around in a Rutherford atom model
- Nickname: BSTA, Beehive, Beehive Academy
- Website: www.beehiveacademy.org

Beehive Science and Technology Academy (BSTA), is a college preparatory charter school located in Sandy, Utah. Open to all students grades K-12, Beehive's focus is math, science and technology. Beehive supports creative development through their art programs.
