= Istanbul Kent University =

University in Istanbul, Turkey

- İstanbul Kent Üniversitesi
- Established: 2016; 10 years ago
- President: Berna Yılmaz
- Vice-Chancellor: A. Tuğrul Biren
- Faculty: 6
- Location: Istanbul, Turkey; 41°02′00.9″N 28°59′03.5″E
- Campus: Urban
- Language: Turkish, English
- Colors: Dark red
- Website: www.kent.edu.tr

Istanbul Kent University (Turkish: İstanbul Kent Üniversitesi), is a university in Istanbul's Cihangir district, located on Sıraselviler Street in the district. The Chairperson of the University's Board of Trustees is Berna Yılmaz, and the Rector is Necmettin Atsü.

== Campuses ==
=== Taksim ===
Taksim is the central campus where the university's administrative units are located. The Faculty of Dentistry, the Oral and Dental Health Practice and Research Center, and the Graduate Education Institute are located on this campus.
