= İzmir Bakırçay University =

Public university in İzmir, Turkey

Coordinates: 38.581°N 26.964°E

- İzmir Bakırçay Üniversitesi
- Motto: Özel Bir Devlet Üniversitesi
- Motto in English: A Special Public University
- Type: Public university
- Established: 20 August 2016
- Location: Gazi Mustafa Kemal Mahallesi, Kaynaklar Caddesi 35665 Menemen, İzmir, Turkey
- Campus: 12 hectares (30 acres); Rural
- Colors
- Website: Official website

İzmir Bakırçay University (Turkish: İzmir Bakırçay Üniversitesi) is a public university in İzmir, Turkey. It was established by the Grand National Assembly of Turkey on 20 August 2016 with other 3 new universities. (Note: These are Beykoz University, İstanbul Kent University and İzmir Democracy University)

İzmir Bakırçay University was cited by the press as the successor of Gediz University, which was closed private university by Turkish government on 23 July 2016. But the Council of Higher Education denied it and explained that İzmir Bakırçay University wasn't founded in place of Gediz University.

The campus in Menemen district is served by the provincial road 35-82, which connects it into the İzmir Beltway and D.550 road.

== Organization ==
İzmir Bakırçay University has 5 faculties, 3 institutes and 4 other schools.

=== Faculties ===
- Faculty of Science and Literature
- Faculty of Administrative and Economic Sciences
- Faculty of Law
- Faculty of Engineering and Architecture
- Faculty of Medical Sciences

=== Institutes ===
- Institute of Graduate Studies in Science and Engineering
- Institute of Social Sciences
- Institute of Medical Sciences

=== Other schools ===
- Vocational School of Health Services
- School of Foreign Languages
- Vocational School of Justice
- Vocational School
