= Bursa Orhangazi University =

University in Bursa, Turkey

- Bursa Orhangazi Üniversitesi
- Former university logo
- Motto: Eğitimin Hayat Boyu Seninle
- Type: Private university
- Active: 2011–23 July 2016
- President: Hilmi Gülcemal
- Rector: Prof. Dr. Recep İleri
- Address: Mimar Sinan Mah., Mimar Sinan Bulvarı (Eflak Cad.), No:177, 16310 Yıldırım/Bursa, Bursa, Turkey; 40.2148°N 29.0939°E
- Campus: Yıldırım Campus
- Language: English
- Website: bou.edu.tr (inactive)

Bursa Orhangazi University (Turkish: Bursa Orhangazi Üniversitesi) was a private university located in Bursa, Turkey. Established in 2011 by the Uludağ Culture and Education Foundation, it became the first and only private (foundation) university in the city. The university offered programs mainly in engineering, social sciences, and architecture.

The university was placed under the administration of a government trustee (kayyım) in June 2016. It was subsequently closed on 23 July 2016, along with several other higher education institutions, by the statutory decree adopted during the Turkish state of emergency, citing national security concerns. The students were transferred to Bursa Technical University.

== Academic structure ==
The university comprised the following faculties and schools:

- Faculty of Engineering
  - Electrical and Electronics Engineering (Turkish/English)
  - Mechanical Engineering (Turkish/English)
  - Civil Engineering (Turkish/English)
  - Computer Engineering (English)
  - Industrial Engineering (English)
- Faculty of Economics and Administrative Sciences
  - Business Administration (Turkish/English)
  - Political Science and International Relations
  - International Trade (English)
  - Banking and Finance (English)
- Faculty of Architecture and Design
  - Architecture
  - Interior Architecture and Environmental Design (English)
- Graduate Schools
  - Institute of Natural Sciences
  - Institute of Social Sciences

== Closure ==
Bursa Orhangazi University was closed by a statutory decree in July 2016, along with 14 other private universities in Turkey, as part of government measures following the failed coup attempt of 2016. The closure was due to alleged links with groups considered to pose a threat to national security. Students were placed in other state universities, primarily Bursa Technical University.
