= Melikşah University =

University in Turkey

- Melikşah Üniversitesi
- Motto: Birlikte Geleceğin Güvencesi
- Motto in English: Assurance of The Future Together
- Type: Private University
- Active: 2008–23 July 2016
- President: Mahmut Dursun Mat
- Location: Talas, Kayseri, Turkey
- Language: English, Turkish
- Sporting affiliation: Melikşah Spor Kulübü
- Website: www.meliksah.edu.tr

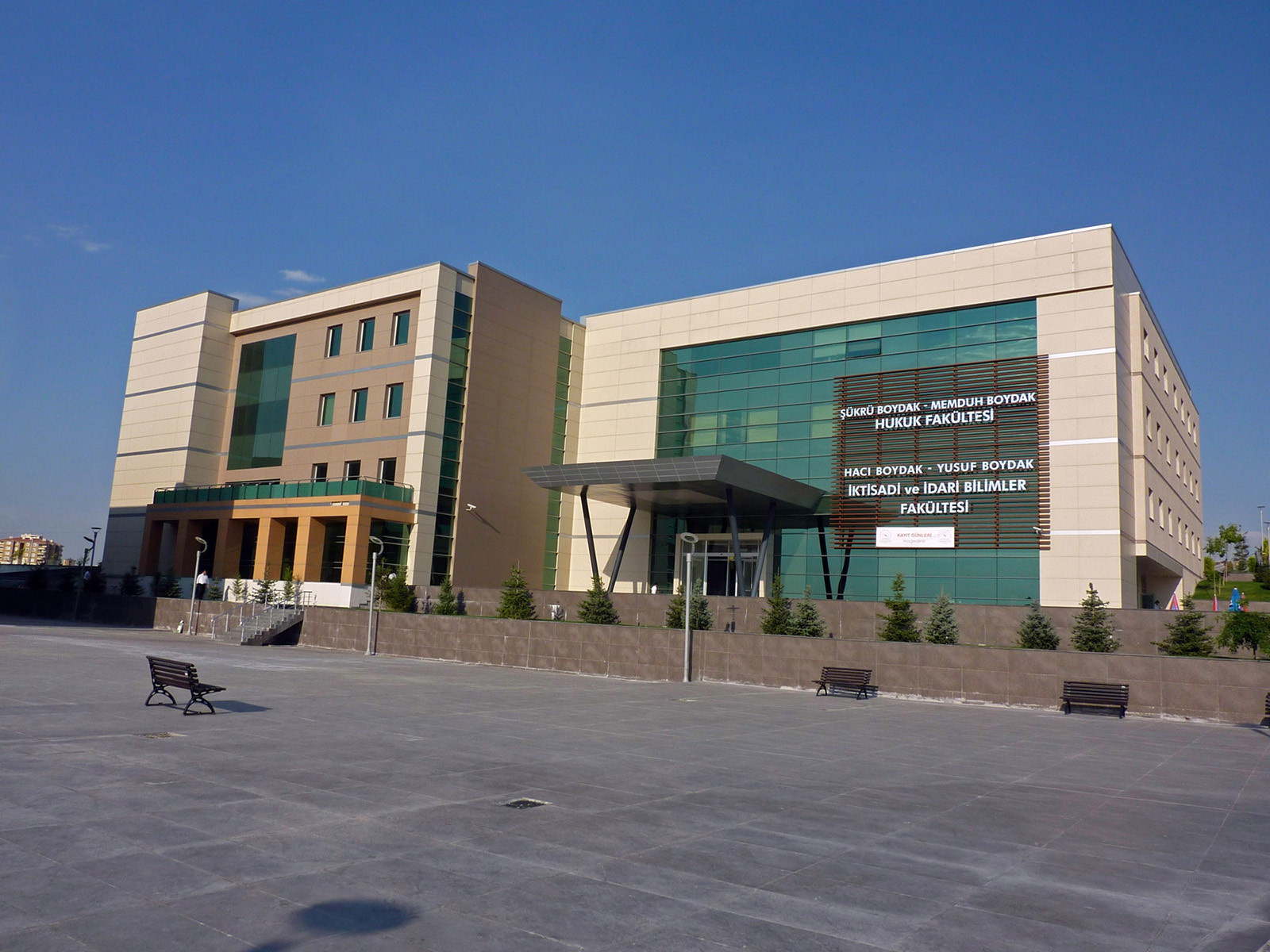
Melikşah University campus.

Melikşah University (Turkish: Melikşah Üniversitesi) was a private university located in the Talas district of Kayseri Province, Turkey. Established in 2008, it was the second university established in Kayseri, and its first private university. It was named after Malik-Shah I (reigned between 1072 and 1092), a sultan of Seljuk Turks.

Melikşah University was established by Burç Eğitim Kültür ve Sağlık Vakfı and covered an area of 32,025 m^{2} (344,710 sq ft).

On 23 July 2016, Melikşah University, along with 14 other Turkish universities, was closed by a statutory decree under the state of emergency declared by the Turkish government following the 2016 Turkish coup d'état attempt. The government alleged the university had ties to the Gülenist which has been accused by Turkey of being behind the coup plot. The university's assets were seized and transferred to Erciyes University. At the time of its closure the university had an academic staff of 175 and 4500 students. Scholars at Risk has expressed concern at these mass closures, saying that they have a chilling effect on academic freedom, undermine democratic society, and may represent a grave threat to higher education in Turkey.

== Academic units ==
=== Faculties ===
- Faculty of Arts and Sciences
- Faculty of Law
- Faculty of Economics and Administrative Sciences
- Architectural and Engineering Faculty
- Faculty of Health Sciences

=== Institutes ===
- Institute of Sciences
- Institute of Social Sciences

=== Education centers ===
- Continuous Education, Application and Research Center
