= Mevlana University =

Defunct university in Turkey

- Mevlana Üniversitesi
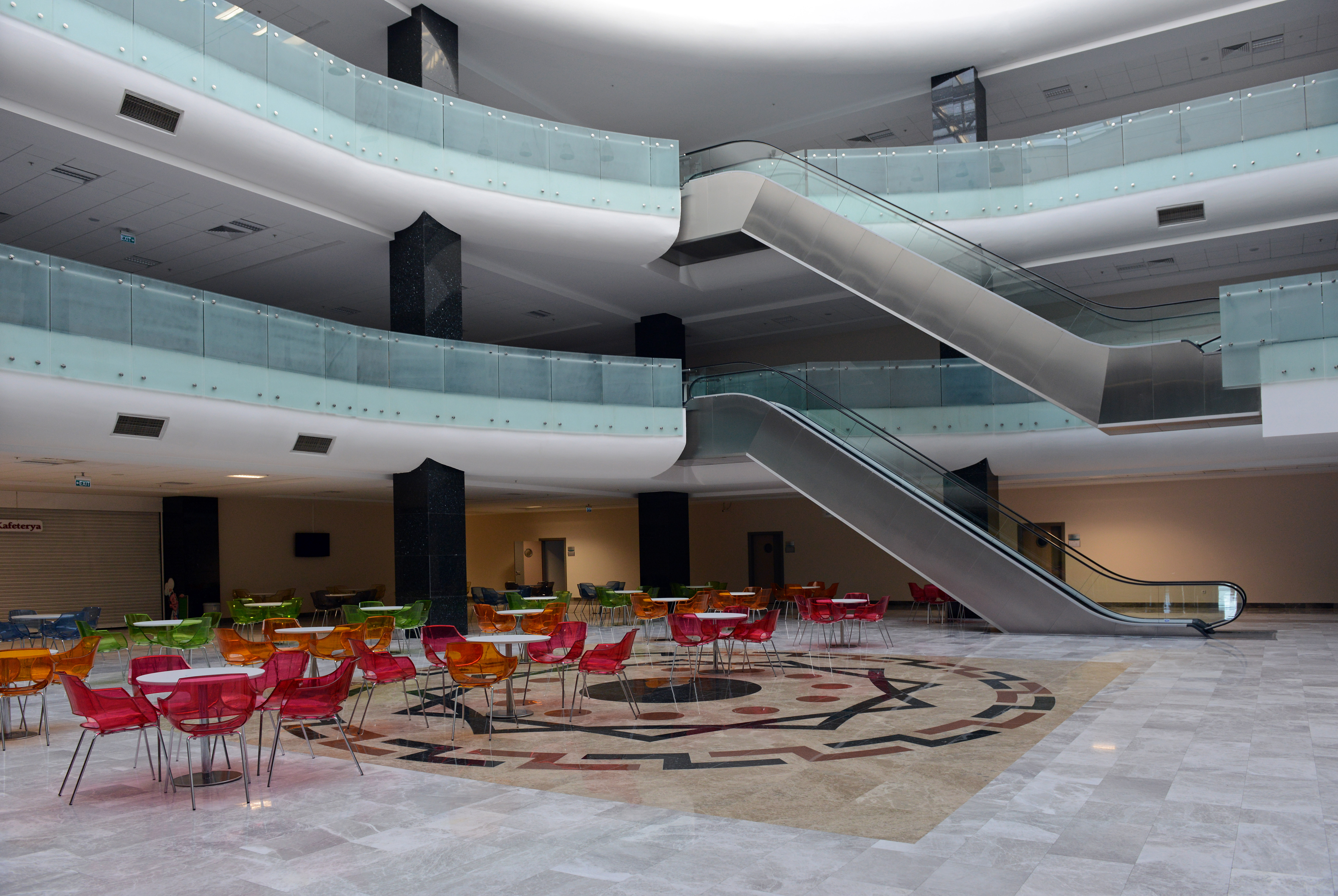
- Cafeteria of Mevlana University
- Type: Private university
- Active: 2009–23 July 2016
- Location: Selçuklu, Konya, Turkey; 38°0′24″N 32°30′58″E
- Website: www.mevlana.edu.tr

Mevlana University (Turkish: Mevlana Üniversitesi) was a private (foundation) university located in Selçuklu, a metropolitan district of Konya, Turkey.

The university was founded in 2009 and takes its name from Mevlânâ Celâleddîn-i Rûmî. In July 2016, 196 faculty members, 3,784 undergraduate, 349 master, and 36 Ph.D. students were actively continuing their education at the university. On 23 July 2016, in the course of the 2016 Turkish purges, the university was closed by the Turkish government due to its alleged ties with the Gülen movement. Scholars at Risk has expressed concern at these mass closures, saying that they have a chilling effect on academic freedom, undermine democratic society, and may represent a grave threat to higher education in Turkey.

On 2 August 2016, Mevlana University's rights were transferred to Selçuk University. Students from the Faculty of Education were transferred to Necmettin Erbakan University. All other students were transferred to Selçuk University.
