= Zirve University =

University in Turkey

- Zirve Üniversitesi
- Motto: From the summit of education to the summit of life
- Type: Private
- Active: 2009–23 July 2016
- Location: Gaziantep, Turkey
- Campus: Kızılhisar
- Colors: Green, white
- Website: http://www.zirve.edu.tr/en/

The Zirve University (Turkish: Zirve Üniversitesi) was a private university established in 2009, located in Gaziantep, southeastern Anatolia, Turkey. The university had eight faculties. It was a mix-oriented (research and education) institution. English language was the primary medium of teaching in College of Engineering, College of Architecture and Design, and College of Economics and Administrative Sciences. Turkish language was the primary medium of teaching for the rest of colleges while several courses were also offered in English. The university had total enrollment of more than 8,000 undergraduate and graduate students in 2016.

Around 20% of the students were offered tuition-free education while another 20% were offered 50% tuition scholarship based on their success at National University Entrance Exam done by ÖSYM. The university also offered full scholarships for those who has significant sport excellence and/or national license of sport. The university was listed among the top 50 most entrepreneur and innovator university list by TÜBİTAK..

== Faculties ==
- Faculty of Architecture and Design
- Faculty of Communication
- Faculty of Engineering
- Faculty of Economics and Administrative Sciences
- Faculty of Education
- Faculty of Law
- Faculty of Health Sciences
- Faculty of Medicine
- Faculty of Dentistry
- School of Foreign Languages
- Vocational School
- Institute of Health Sciences
- Institute of Social Sciences
- Institute of Science

== Research Centers ==
- Middle East Strategic Research Center
- Nanotechnology Research and Application Center
- Food and Agriculture Center
- Continuing Education Center
- Physiotherapy and rehabilitation Center
- Turkish Language Center
- Marine Engineering Simulation Center
