= Kanuni University =

Turkish University

Coordinates: 37.0058°N 35.2501°E

- Kanuni Üniversitesi
- Type: Foundation
- Active: 2013–2016
- Rector: Osman Serindağ
- Location: Adana, Turkey

Kanuni University was a higher education institution in the city of Adana. The university was founded in 2013 by the Çukurova Education and Culture Foundation.

== Academics ==
=== Faculties ===
- Faculty of Management and Economics
- Faculty of Engineering
- Faculty of Human Sciences

== Institutes ==
- Social Sciences Institute
- Natural Sciences Institute
