= İpek University =

Turkish private university

- İpek Üniversitesi
- Type: Private University
- Active: 2011–23 July 2016
- President: Prof. Dr. Ali Fuat Bilkan
- Location: Çankaya, Ankara, Turkey; 39°51′27″N 32°50′44″E
- Website: ipek.edu.tr/en/

İpek University (Turkish: İpek Üniversitesi, lit. 'Silk University') was a private university in Çankaya, the central district of Ankara, Turkey. Established in 2011, the university was one out of fifteen private universities that were closed by the Turkish government in the course of the 2016 Turkish purges.

== Gallery ==
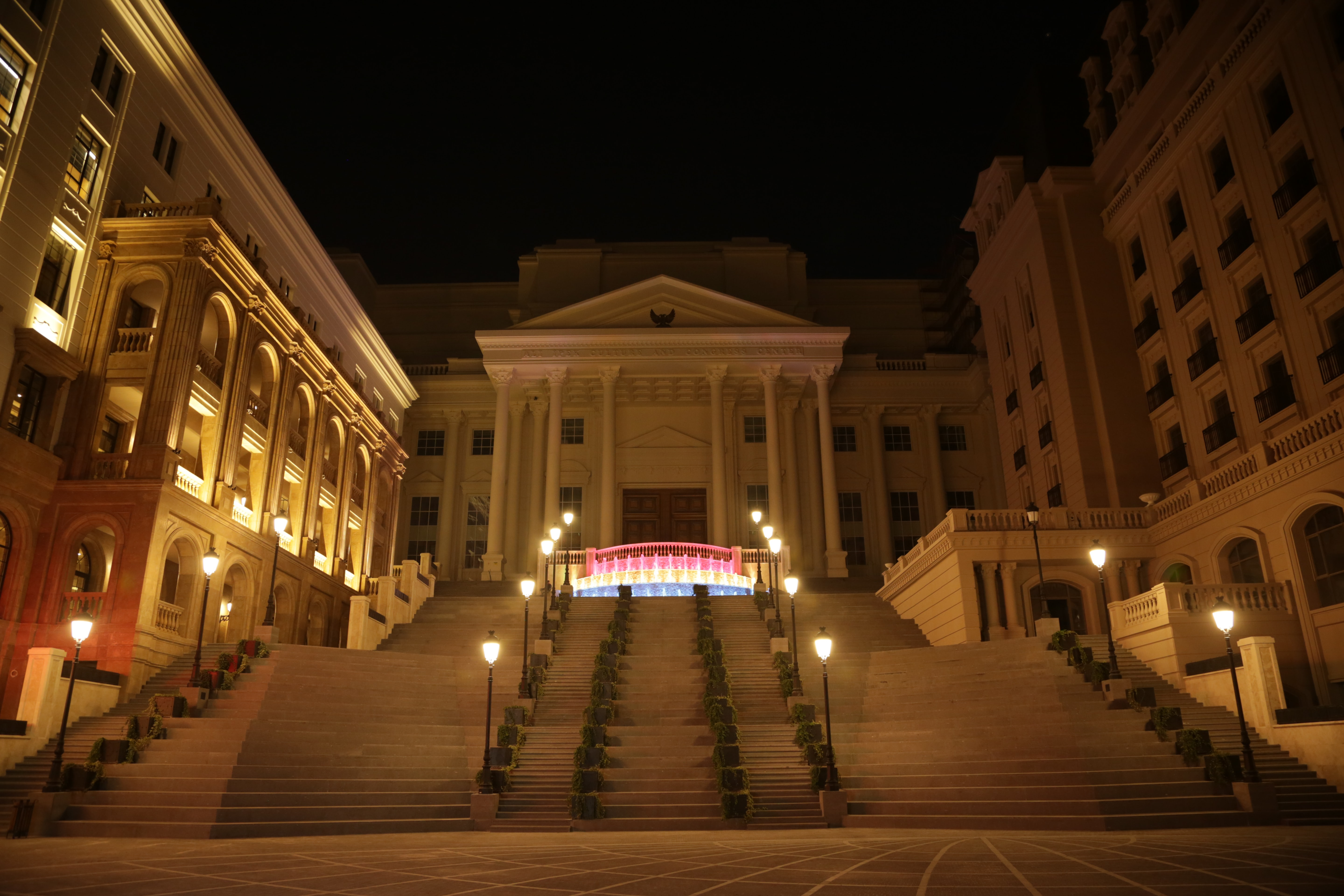

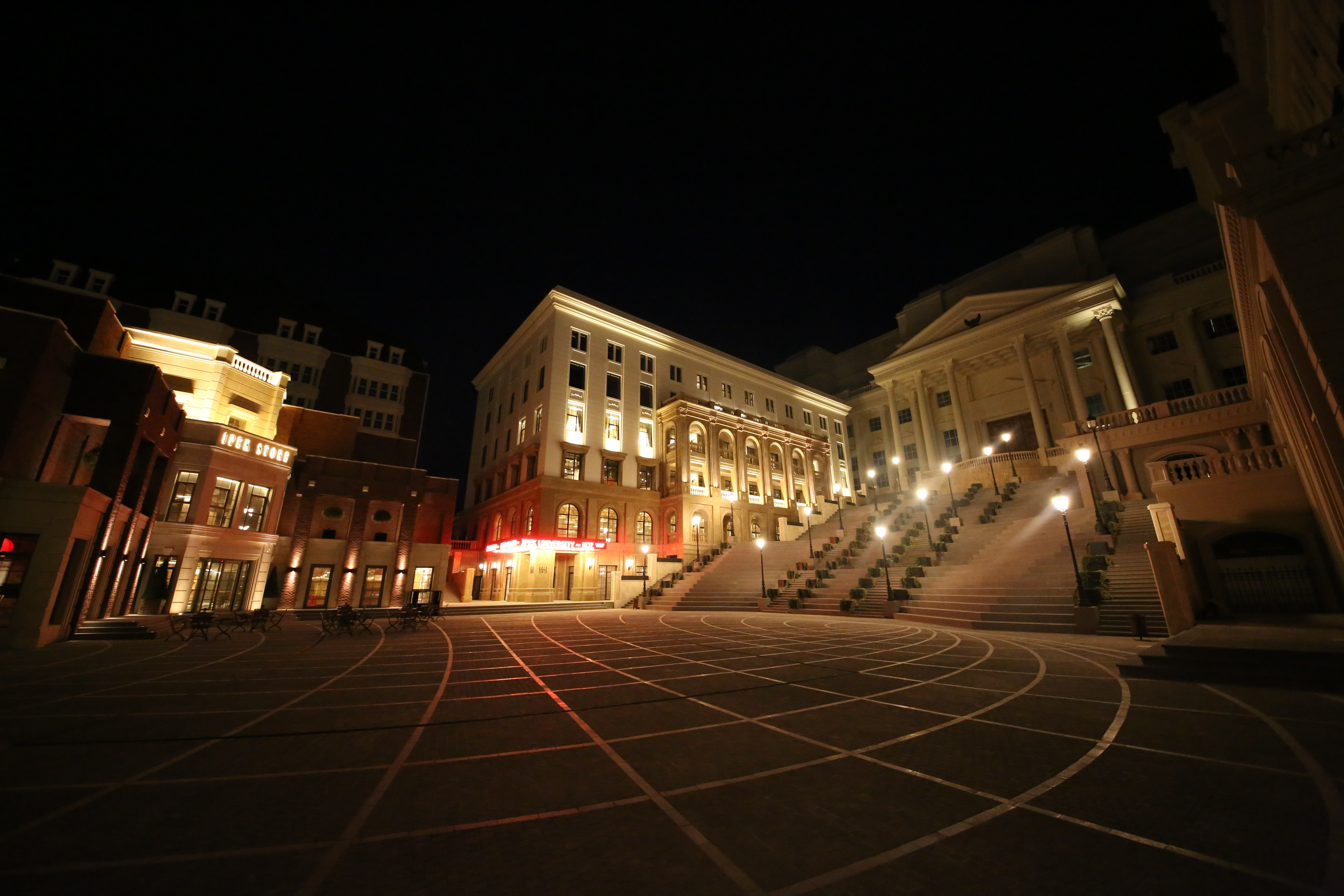

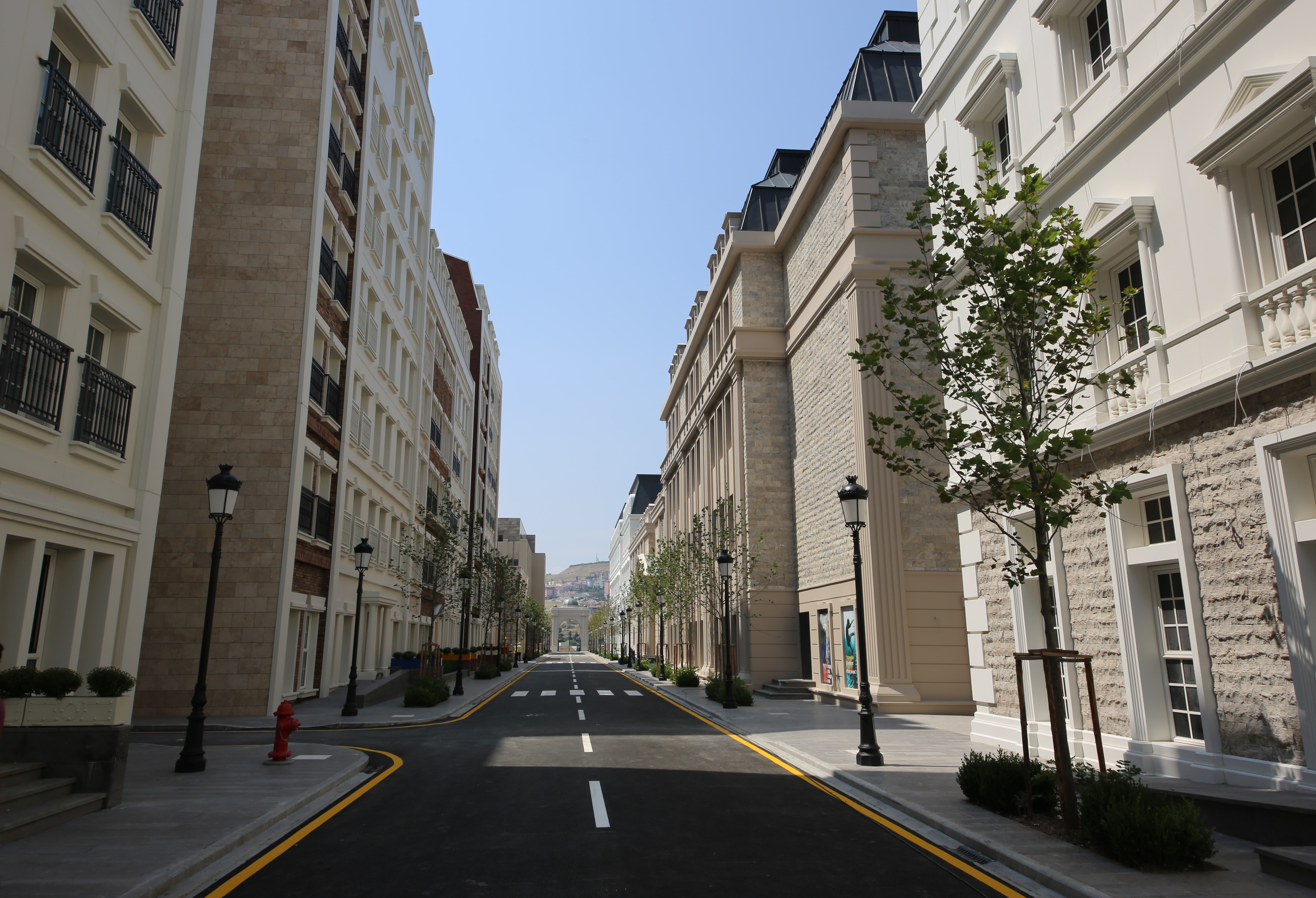
