= Canik Başarı University =

Private university in Canik, Samsun, Turkey

- Canik Başarı Üniversitesi
- Type: Private university
- Active: 2012–23 July 2016
- Location: Canik, Samsun, Turkey; 41°13′57″N 36°22′15″E
- Website: www.basari.edu.tr

Canik Başarı University (Turkish: Canik Başarı Üniversitesi), başarı meaning "success", was a private university in Canik, a district of Samsun, Turkey.

Established in 2012 and directed by a foundation ("Vakıf" in Turkish), it constituted the first private university in Samsun Province, The university was one out of fifteen private universities that were closed by the Turkish government in the course of the 2016 Turkish purges following the 15 July failed coup attempt.

== Subjects ==
Undergraduate: Teaching Turkish, Counseling psychology, Molecular Biology and Genetics, Management, International Trade and Management, Building Engineering, Architecture

Masters: MBA, Health Administration, Education Management Planning and Economics
