= Gediz University =

University in Turkey

- Gediz Üniversitesi
- Type: Private university
- Active: 2008–23 July 2016
- Rector: Seyfullah Çevik
- Students: 8,500
- Doctoral students: 200
- Location: Menemen, İzmir, Turkey
- Colors: Red and white
- Mascot: Hawk
- Website: Official website

Gediz University (Turkish: Gediz Üniversitesi) was a private university located in the Seyrek neighborhood of Menemen, a metropolitan district of İzmir, Turkey. It was established in 2008. On 23 July 2016, in the course of the 2016 Turkish purges, the university was closed by the Turkish government due to its alleged ties with the Gülen movement. The Bakırçay University was founded on the campus of Gediz University.

== Closure ==
Gediz University was closed down in accordance with the Decree Law No. 667, which was decided after the military coup attempt on July 15, 2016, on the grounds that it was among the institutions "identified as belonging, affiliated or connected to the Fethullahist Terrorist Organization (FETÖ/PDY), which was determined to pose a threat to national security." It was decided that the students of the Faculty of Law would be placed at Dokuz Eylül University and other students at Katip Çelebi University. However, as a result of a series of amended decisions, it was decided that the students (just like the other students whose universities were closed) would be placed again with the score they received in the year they entered the university. Former students were not admitted to the new state university established to replace Gediz University.
