= Turgut Özal University =

Private university in Ankara, Turkey

- Turgut Özal Üniversitesi
- Type: Private university
- Active: 2008–23 July 2016
- Location: Keçiören, Ankara, Turkey

Turgut Özal University (Turkish: Turgut Özal Üniversitesi) was a private university located in the Etlik neighborhood of Keçiören, a metropolitan district of Ankara, Turkey.

The university was established in 2008 by the Turgut Özal Thought and Action Foundation and is named after former Turkish president Turgut Özal. On 23 July 2016, in the course of the 2016 Turkish purges, the university was shut down by the Turkish government among other 15 universities due to its alleged ties with the Gülen movement.

The facilities and students were transferred to Ankara Yildirim Beyazit University
