= İzmir University =

University in İzmir, Turkey

- İzmir Üniversitesi
- Type: Private university
- Active: 2007–23 July 2016
- Rector: Prof. Dr. Kayhan Erciyeş
- Location: Karabağlar, İzmir, Turkey
- Website: www.izmir.edu.tr

İzmir University (Turkish: İzmir Üniversitesi) was a university in the Üçkuyular neighborhood of Karabağlar, a metropolitan district of İzmir, Turkey. It was established in 2007 by the Doğanata Education and Culture Foundation, which opened in 2008. On 23 July 2016, in the course of the 2016 Turkish purges, the university was closed by the Turkish government due to its alleged ties with the Gülen movement. The staff of the university rejected the accusations.

== Faculties ==
=== Faculty of Economics and Administrative Sciences ===
The Faculty of Economics and Administrative Sciences consisted of four departments:

- Department of Business Administration
- Department of Political Science and Administration
- Department of International Relations
- Department of Trade and Finance

=== Faculty of Arts and Sciences ===
The Faculty of Arts and Sciences consisted of four departments:

- Department of American Culture and Literature
- Department of English Language Teaching
- Department of Psychology
- Department of Mathematics and Computer Sciences

=== Faculty of Engineering ===
The Faculty of Engineering consisted of four departments:

- Department of Computer Engineering (in English)
- Department of Electronics and Telecommunication Engineering (in English)
- Department of Software Engineering (in English)
- Department of Industrial Engineering (in English)

=== Faculty of Architecture ===
The Faculty of Engineering consisted of two departments:

- Dept. of Architecture
- Dept. of Interior Arch. and Envir.

=== School of Health ===
The School of Health consisted of two departments:

- Department of Nursing
- Department of Physiotherapy and Rehabilitation

=== Vocational School ===
The university's vocational school offered courses in:

- Computer Programming
- Child Development
- Accounting and Tax App.
- Electronics and Tel. Tech.
- Tourism and Hotel Management
- Tourism and Travel Management

=== Institutes ===
- Institute of Engineering and Physical Sciences
- Institute of Social Sciences
