= Institute of technology =

Type of institution offering tertiary education

An institute of technology (also referred to as technological/technology university/college, technical university/college, university/college of technology, polytechnic university) is an institution of tertiary education that specializes in engineering, technology, applied science, and natural sciences.

== Institutes of technology versus polytechnics ==
The institutes of technology and polytechnics have been in existence since at least the 18th century, but became popular after World War II with the expansion of engineering and applied science education, associated with the new needs created by industrialization. Among the oldest institutions of technology are the Czech Technical University in Prague (1707), Braunschweig University of Technology (1745), Istanbul Technical University (1773), Budapest University of Technology and Economics (1782), and the École Polytechnique in Paris (1794). In some cases, polytechnics or institutes of technology are engineering schools or technical colleges.

In several countries, like Germany, the Netherlands, Italy, Switzerland, and Turkey, institutes of technology are institutions of higher education and have been accredited to award academic degrees and doctorates. Famous examples are the Istanbul Technical University, ETH Zurich, Delft University of Technology, Politecnico di Milano and RWTH Aachen all considered universities.

In countries like Iran, Finland, Malaysia, Portugal, Singapore or the United Kingdom, there is often a significant and confused distinction between polytechnics and universities. In the UK, a binary system of higher education emerged consisting of universities (research orientation) and polytechnics (engineering and applied science and professional practice orientation). Polytechnics offered university equivalent degrees mainly in STEM subjects from bachelor's, master's and PhD that were validated and governed at the national level by the independent UK Council for National Academic Awards. In 1992, UK polytechnics were designated as universities which meant they could award their own degrees. The CNAA was disbanded. The UK's first polytechnic, the Royal Polytechnic Institution (now the University of Westminster), was founded in 1838 in Regent Street, London. In Ireland the term "institute of technology" is the more favored synonym of a "regional technical college" though the latter is the legally correct term; however, Dublin Institute of Technology was a university in all but name as it can confer degrees in accordance with law; Cork Institute of Technology and other Institutes of Technology have delegated authority from HETAC to make awards to and including master's degree level—Level 9 of Ireland's National Framework for Qualifications (NFQ)—for all areas of study and Doctorate level in a number of others. In 2018, Ireland passed the Technological Universities Act, which allowed a number of Institutes of Technology to transform into Technological Universities.

In a number of countries, although now generally considered similar institutions of higher learning, polytechnics and institutes of technology used to have quite different statures, teaching competences, and organizational histories. In many cases, "polytechnic" were elite technological universities concentrating on applied science and engineering and may also be a former designation for a vocational institution, before it has been granted the exclusive right to award academic degrees and can be truly called an "institute of technology". A number of polytechnics providing higher education is simply a result of a formal upgrading from their original and historical role as intermediate technical education schools. In some situations, former polytechnics or other non-university institutions have emerged solely through an administrative change of statutes, which often included a name change with the introduction of new designations like "institute of technology", "polytechnic university", "university of applied sciences" or "university of technology" for marketing purposes. Such emergence of so many upgraded polytechnics, former vocational education and technical schools converted into more university-like institutions has caused concern where the lack of specialized intermediate technical professionals lead to industrial skill shortages in some fields, being also associated to an increase of the graduate unemployment rate. This is mostly the case in those countries, where the education system is not controlled by the state and any institution can grant degrees. Evidence has also shown a decline in the general quality of teaching and graduate's preparation for the workplace, due to the fast-paced conversion of that technical institutions to more advanced higher level institutions. Mentz, Kotze and Van der Merwe argue that all the tools are in place to promote the debate on the place of technology in higher education in general and in universities of technology specifically and they posit several questions for the debate.

== Institutes by country ==
=== Argentina ===
In Argentina, the main higher institution devoted to the study of technology is the National Technological University which has Regional Faculties throughout Argentina. The Buenos Aires Institute of Technology (ITBA) and Balseiro Institute are other recognized institutes of technology.

=== Australia ===
1970s–1990s

During the 1970s to early 1990s, the term was used to describe state owned and funded technical schools that offered both vocational and higher education. They were part of the College of Advanced Education system. In the 1990s most of these merged with existing universities or formed new ones of their own. These new universities often took the title University of Technology, for marketing rather than legal purposes. AVCC report The most prominent such university in each state founded the Australian Technology Network a few years later.

1990s–today

Since the mid-1990s, the term has been applied to some technically minded technical and further education (TAFE) institutes. A recent example is the Melbourne Polytechnic rebranding and repositioning in 2014 from Northern Melbourne Institute of TAFE. These primarily offer vocational education, although some like Melbourne Polytechnic are expanding into higher education offering vocationally oriented applied bachelor's degrees. This usage of the term is most prevalent historically in NSW and the ACT. The new terminology is apt given that this category of institution are becoming very much like the institutes of the 1970s–1990s period.

In 2009, the old college system in Tasmania and TAFE Tasmania have started a 3-year restructure to become the Tasmanian Polytechnic www.polytechnic.tas.edu.au, Tasmanian Skills Institute www.skillsinstitute.tas.edu.au and Tasmanian Academy www.academy.tas.edu.au

In the higher education sector, there are seven designated universities of technology in Australia (though, note, not all use the phrase "university of technology", such as the Universities of Canberra and South Australia, which used to be Colleges of Advanced Education before transitioning into fully-fledged universities with the ability – most important of all – to confer doctorates):

- Curtin University, Western Australia
- Queensland University of Technology, Queensland
- Royal Melbourne Institute of Technology, Victoria
- Swinburne University of Technology, Victoria
- University of Canberra, Australian Capital Territory
- University of South Australia, South Australia
- University of Technology Sydney, New South Wales

=== Austria ===
Universities of technology

These institutions are entitled to confer habilitation and doctoral degrees and focus on research.

- Graz University of Technology (13,454 students, founded 1811, Hochschule since 1865, doctoral degrees since 1901, university since 1975)
- TU Wien (27,923 students, founded 1815, Hochschule since 1872, doctoral degrees since 1901, university since 1975)
- University of Natural Resources and Life Sciences, Vienna focused on agriculture (12,500 students, founded as Hochschule in 1872, doctoral degrees since 1906, university since 1975)
- University of Leoben specialized in mining, metallurgy and materials (4,030 students, founded 1840, Hochschule since 1904, doctoral degrees since 1906, university since 1975)

Research institutions

These institutions focus only on research.

- Austrian Institute of Technology (founded 1956)
- Institute of Science and Technology Austria (founded 2007)

Technical faculties at universities

Several universities have faculties of technology that are entitled to confer habilitation and doctoral degrees and which focus on research.

- Johannes Kepler University Linz (Faculty of Engineering and Natural Sciences founded 1965, university since 1975)
- University of Innsbruck (Faculty of Civil Engineering founded 1969)
- Alpen-Adria-Universität Klagenfurt (Faculty of Technical Sciences founded 2007)

Fachhochschulen

Fachhochschule is a German type of tertiary education institution and adopted later in Austria and Switzerland. They do not focus exclusively on technology, but may also offer courses in social science, medicine, business and design. They grant bachelor's degrees and master's degrees and focus more on teaching than research and more on specific professions than on science.

In 2010, there were 20 Fachhochschulen in Austria

=== Bangladesh ===
There are some public engineering universities and colleges in Bangladesh:

- Bangladesh University of Engineering and Technology (BUET)
- Chittagong University of Engineering and Technology (CUET). Formerly known as Bangladesh Institute of Technology, Chittagong.
- Khulna University of Engineering and Technology (KUET). Formerly known as Bangladesh Institute of Technology, Khulna
- Rajshahi University of Engineering and Technology (RUET). Formerly known as Bangladesh Institute of Technology, Rajshahi.
- Dhaka University of Engineering and Technology (DUET). Formerly known as Bangladesh Institute of Technology, Dhaka.
- Sylhet Engineering College (SEC) which is affiliated with the Faculty of Applied Sciences & Technology, Shahjalal University of Science and Technology.
- Mymensingh Engineering College (MEC) which is affiliated with the Faculty of Engineering & Technology, University of Dhaka.
- Faridpur Engineering College (FEC) which is affiliated with the Faculty of Engineering & Technology, University of Dhaka.
- Barisal Engineering College (BEC) which is affiliated with the Faculty of Engineering & Technology, University of Dhaka.

There are some general, technological and specialized universities in Bangladesh offer engineering programs:

- University of Chittagong. Engineering programs offer under the Faculty of Engineering and Technology.
- University of Dhaka. Engineering programs offer under the Faculty of Engineering and Technology.
- University of Khulna. Engineering programs offer under the Faculty of Science, Engineering and Technology.
- University of Rajshahi. Engineering programs offer under the Faculty of Engineering and Technology.
- Islamic University, Bangladesh (IU). Engineering programs offer under the Faculty of Applied Science and Technology.
- Shahjalal University of Science and Technology. Engineering programs offer under the Faculty of Applied Science and Technology.
- Bangladesh University of Textiles (BUTEX). Specialized institution that offers various engineering programs with its interdisciplinary curricula.

There are some private engineering universities in Bangladesh:

- Ahsanullah University of Science and Technology (AUST)
- Military Institute of Science and Technology (MIST)

There is only one international engineering university in Bangladesh:

- Islamic University of Technology (IUT)

There are numerous private and other universities as well as science and technology universities providing engineering education. Most prominent are:

- American International University-Bangladesh
- Bangladesh University of Business and Technology. Engineering programs offer under the Faculty of Engineering and Technology.
- North South University
- International Islamic University Chittagong
- East West University
- BRAC University
- Independent University, Bangladesh
- European University of Bangladesh

There are numerous government-funded as well as private polytechnic institutes, engineering colleges and science and technology institutes providing engineering education. Most prominent are:

- Bangladesh Institute of Glass and Ceramics
- Dhaka Polytechnic Institute
- Chittagong Polytechnic Institute
- Bangladesh Survey Institute
- Govt. Arts Graphics Institute
- Bangladesh Institute of Marine Technology
- Mymensingh Engineering College
- Narayangonj Technical School and College

=== Belarus ===
- Belarusian National Technical University (BNTU) (Minsk, Belarus)
- Belarusian State Technological University (Minsk, Belarus)
- Belarusian State University of Informatics and Radioelectronics (Minsk, Belarus)
- Brest State Technical University (Brest, Belarus)
- Pavel Sukhoi State Technical University of Gomel (Gomel, Belarus)
- Vitebsk State Technological University (Vitebsk, Belarus)

=== Belgium and the Netherlands ===
In the Netherlands, there are four universities of technology, jointly known as 4TU:

- Delft University of Technology (TU Delft)
- Eindhoven University of Technology (TU Eindhoven)
- Universiteit Twente (U Twente)
- Wageningen University (Wageningen U)

In Belgium and in the Netherlands, Hogescholen or Hautes écoles (also translated into colleges, university colleges or universities of applied science) are applied institutes of higher education that do not award doctorates. They are generally limited to Bachelor-level education, with degrees called professional bachelors, and only minor Master's programmes. The hogeschool thus has many similarities to the Fachhochschule in the German language areas and to the ammattikorkeakoulu in Finland. A list of all hogescholen in the Netherlands, including some which might be called polytechnics, can be found at the end of this list.

=== Brazil ===
Federal:

- Federal Centers for Technological Education (CEFET)
  - CEFET of Minas Gerais
  - CEFET of Rio de Janeiro

Some CEFETs were turned into Federal Institutes of Education, Science and Technology.

- Federal Institute of Education, Science and Technology (IFET)
  Each State has either one (e.g. Pará) or multiple (e.g. Minas Gerais). They are not related to Federal Universities, but offer undergraduate and technical degrees, sometimes, even graduate degrees.
  - Federal Institute of Bahia
  - Federal Institute of São Paulo
  - Baiano Federal Institute - IF Baiano
  - Federal Institute of Pará
  - Federal Institute of Rio de Janeiro
  - Federal Institute of Southern Minas - IFSULDEMINAS
  - Federal Institute of Maranhao
- Federal Technological University of Paraná (University derived from a federal technical college)

Service academy:

- Instituto Militar de Engenharia
- The Instituto Tecnológico de Aeronáutica is regarded as one of the best engineering and computer science colleges in Brazil, it is known for its hard exams, that require some college level knowledge, such as calculus, from high school graduates. Students can choose whether they want to continue as a service member, or to continue as a civilian.

Private:

- Instituto Nacional de Telecomunicações – Inatel

State:

- Sao Paulo State Technological College
- Technical School of Pará (ETEPA)

=== Bulgaria ===
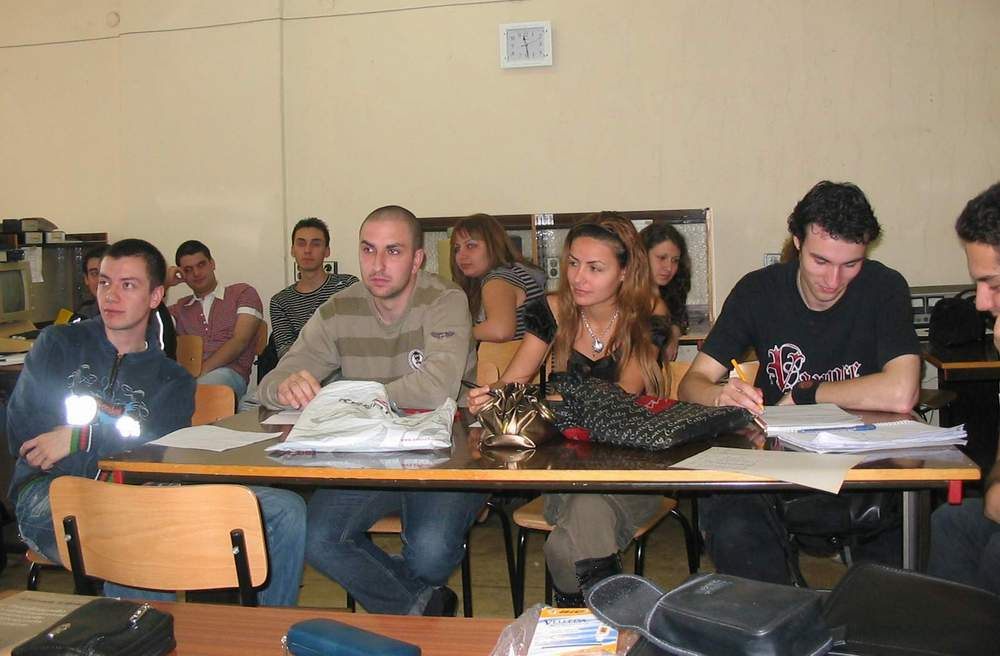
Students at the Technical University of Sofia, Bulgaria

- Technical University of Gabrovo
- Technical University of Sofia
- Technical University of Varna
- University of Chemical Technology and Metallurgy

=== Cambodia ===
In Cambodia, there are institutes of technology/polytechnic institutes and Universities that offer instruction in a variety of programs that can lead to: certificates, diplomas and degrees. Institutes of technology/polytechnic institutes and universities tend to be independent institutions.

Institutes of technology/polytechnic institutes

- Institute of Technology of Cambodia (ITC) or Institut de Technologie du Cambodge (polytechnic institute in Phnom Penh, Cambodia)
- Phnom Penh Institute of Technology (PPIT) (polytechnic institute in Phnom Penh, Cambodia)

Universities

- Royal University of Phnom Penh (RUPP) or Royal Université de Phnom Penh (polytechnic university in Phnom Penh, Cambodia)

=== Canada ===
In Canada, there are affiliate schools, colleges, and institutes of technology/polytechnic institutes that offer instruction in a variety of programs that can lead to the bestowment of apprenticeships, citations, certificates, diplomas, and associate's degrees upon successful completion. Affiliate schools are polytechnic divisions attached to a national university and offer select technical and engineering transfer programs. Colleges, institutes of technology/polytechnic institutes, and universities tend to be independent institutions.

Credentials are typically conferred at the undergraduate level; however, university-affiliated schools like the École de technologie supérieure and the École Polytechnique de Montréal (both of which are located in Quebec), also offer graduate and postgraduate programs, in accordance with provincial higher education guidelines. Canadian higher education institutions, at all levels, undertake directed and applied research with financing allocated through public funding, private equity, or industry sources.

Some of Canada's most well-known colleges and polytechnic institutions partake in collaborative institute-industry projects, leading to technology commercialization. This is made possible through the scope of Polytechnics Canada, a national alliance of eleven leading research-intensive colleges and institutes of technology.

Affiliate schools

- École de technologie supérieure (ETS) (technical school part of the Université du Québec system in Montreal, Quebec)
- Polytechnique Montréal (polytechnic school affiliated with the Université de Montréal in Montreal, Quebec)
- Fisheries and Marine Institute (Polytechnic marine school affiliated with Memorial University of Newfoundland in St. John's)

Colleges

- Algonquin College (Ottawa, Ontario)
- Conestoga College (Kitchener, Ontario)
- George Brown College (Toronto, Ontario)
- Humber College (Toronto)
- Red River College (Winnipeg, Manitoba)
- Seneca Polytechnic (Toronto)
- St. Clair College (Windsor)

Institutes of technology/polytechnic institutes

- British Columbia Institute of Technology (BCIT; polytechnic institute in Burnaby, British Columbia)
- Kwantlen Polytechnic University (polytechnic university in Surrey, British Columbia)
- Northern Alberta Institute of Technology (NAIT; polytechnic institute in Edmonton, Alberta)
- Toronto Metropolitan University (formerly Ryerson Polytechnical Institute, university in Toronto, Ontario) – The former Ryerson University was one of the originators of applied education in Ontario and Canada. It became a university in 1993 and dropped the term "polytechnic" in 2002, after it gained the right to grant master's and doctoral degrees, as well as changing the name of some degree designations to bring it in line with other traditional research universities.
- Saskatchewan Polytechnic, formerly SIAST (polytechnic institute; multiple campuses with headquarters in Saskatoon, Saskatchewan)
- Sheridan College (polytechnic institute in Oakville, Ontario)
- Southern Alberta Institute of Technology (SAIT; polytechnic institute in Calgary, Alberta)
- Red Deer Polytechnic (RDP; polytechnic institute in Red Deer, Alberta)
- University of Ontario Institute of Technology (UOIT; university in Oshawa, Ontario)

=== China ===
China's modern higher education began in 1895 with the Imperial Tientsin University which was a polytechnic plus a law department. Liberal arts were not offered until three years later at Capital University. To this day, about half of China's elite universities remain essentially polytechnical.

=== Chile ===
- Federico Santa María Technical University (UTFSM), currently the only active technical university / Institute of technology in Chile, founded initially in 1931 as School of Crafts and Arts and School of Engineering José Miguel Carrera, 18,000 students

=== Costa Rica ===
- The National Technical University (UTN) founded in 2008 by merging several trade and craftsmanship schools, it is a polytechnic.
- The Costa Rica Institute of Technology (TEC) was founded in 1971, has its main campus located in the Cartago province, it is an institute of technology.

=== Croatia ===
In Croatia there are many polytechnic institutes and colleges that offer a polytechnic education. The law about polytechnic education in Croatia was passed in 1997.

=== Czech Republic ===
Technical universities

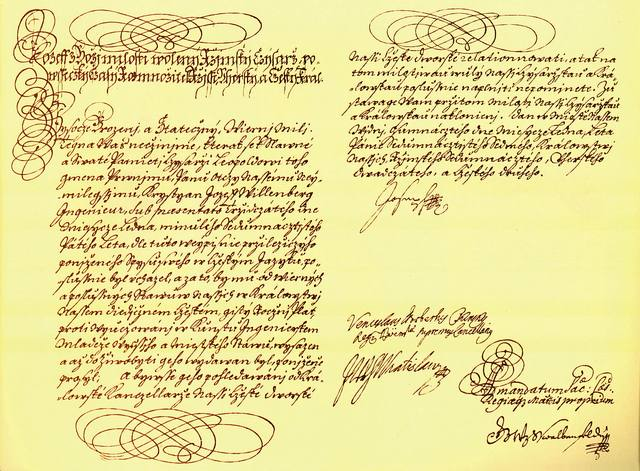
Founding decree of the Czech Technical University in Prague from January 18, 1707

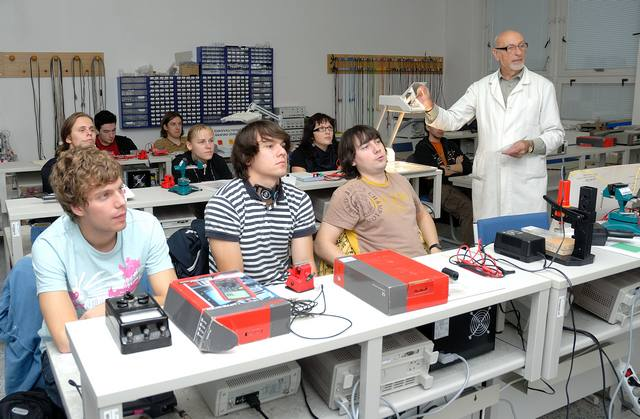
Lecture at the Faculty of Biomedical Engineering, CTU in Prague

- Brno University of Technology (VUT), founded in 1899, 24,000 students
- Collegium Nobilium in Olomouc, 1725–1847
- Czech Technical University in Prague (ČVUT), college founded in 1707, university since 1806, 23,000 students, belongs to the oldest technical universities in the world
- Czech University of Life Sciences Prague (ČZU), founded in 1904, focused on agriculture, 18,000 students
- Institute of Chemical Technology in Prague (VŠCHT), founded in 1952, 3,000 student
- Mendel University in Brno (MENDELU), founded in 1919, focused on agriculture, 9,000 students
- Technical University of Liberec (TUL), founded in 1953, 8,000 students
- Technical University of Ostrava (VŠB TUO), founded in 1849, 22,000 students
- Tomáš Baťa University in Zlín (UTB), founded in 2000, 10,000 students

Research institutions

- Academy of Sciences of the Czech Republic (AV ČR), dates back to 1784, 14,000 research staff altogether

Technical faculties at universities

- Jan Evangelista Purkyně University in Ústí nad Labem (Faculty of Production Technology and Management, university founded in 1991)
- University of Pardubice (Faculty of Chemical Technology since 1950, Jan Perner Faculty of Transportation since 1991, Institute of Electrical Engineering and Informatics since 2002)
- University of West Bohemia (Faculty of Mechanical Engineering, Faculty of Electrical Engineering; University founded in 1991)

=== Denmark ===
- Technical University of Denmark, founded in 1829 by Hans Christian Ørsted

=== Dominican Republic ===
- Instituto Tecnológico de Santo Domingo
- Universidad Tecnológica de Santiago

=== Ecuador ===
- National Polytechnic School (EPN), National Polytechnic School, Quito, Ecuador

EPN is known for research and education in the applied science, astronomy, atmospheric physics, engineering and physical sciences. The Geophysics Institute monitors the country's seismic, tectonic and volcanic activity in the continental territory and in the Galápagos Islands.

One of the oldest observatories in South America is the Quito Astronomical Observatory. It was founded in 1873 and is located 12 minutes south of the Equator in Quito, Ecuador. The Quito Astronomical Observatory is the National Observatory of Ecuador and is located in the Historic Center of Quito and is managed by the National Polytechnic School.

The Nuclear Science Department at EPN is the only one in Ecuador and has the large infrastructure, related to irradiation facilities like cobalt-60 source and electron beam processing.

=== Egypt ===
- Alexandria Higher Institute of Engineering and Technology (AIET)
- Higher Technological Institute
- Institute of Aviation Engineering and Technology

=== Estonia ===
- Tallinn University of Technology (TalTech), a public research university
- Tallinn University of Applied Sciences, a public vocational university
- Estonian Entrepreneurship University of Applied Sciences, a private institution in Tallinn

=== Finland ===
Universities of technology

Universities of technology are categorised as universities, are allowed to grant B.Sc. (Tech.), Diplomi-insinööri M.Sc. (Tech.), Lic.Sc. (Tech.), Ph.D. and D.Sc. (Tech.) degrees and roughly correspond to Instituts de technologie of French-speaking areas and Technische Universität of Germany in prestige. In addition to universities of technology, some universities, e.g. University of Oulu and Åbo Akademi University, are allowed to grant the B.Sc. (tech.), M.Sc. (tech.) and D.Sc. (Tech.) degrees.

Universities of technology are academically similar to other (non-polytechnic) universities. Prior to Bologna process, M.Sc. (Tech.) required 180 credits, whereas M.Sc. from a normal university required 160 credits. The credits between universities of technology and normal universities are comparable.

Some Finnish universities of technology are:

- Aalto University formed from Helsinki University of Technology and other universities
- Lappeenranta-Lahti University of Technology LUT

Polytechnics

Polytechnic schools are distinct from academic universities in Finland. Ammattikorkeakoulu is the common term in Finland, as is the Swedish alternative "yrkeshögskola" – their focus is on studies leading to a degree (for instance insinööri, engineer; in international use, Bachelor of Engineering) in kind different from but in level comparable to an academic bachelor's degree awarded by a university. Since 2006 the polytechnics have offered studies leading to master's degrees (Master of Engineering). After January 1, 2006, some Finnish ammattikorkeakoulus switched the English term "polytechnic" to the term "university of applied sciences" in the English translations of their legal names. The ammattikorkeakoulu has many similarities to the hogeschool in Belgium and in the Netherlands and to the Fachhochschule in the German language areas.

Some recognized Finnish polytechnics are:

- Helsinki Metropolia University of Applied Sciences
- Lapland University of Applied Sciences
- Tampere University of Applied Sciences
- Turku University of Applied Sciences

A complete list may be found in List of polytechnics in Finland.

=== France and Francophone regions ===
Instituts de Technologie (Grandes Écoles)

Collegiate universities grouping several engineering schools or multi-site clusters of French grandes écoles provide sciences and technology curricula as autonomous higher education engineering institutes. They include:

- Arts et Métiers ParisTech
- CentraleSupélec Graduate School
- Grenoble Institute of Technology
- Institut national des sciences appliquées
- Institut Supérieur de l'Aéronautique et de l'Espace
- Paris Institute of Technology
- ESTIA Institute of Technology

They provide science and technology master's degrees and doctoral degrees.

Universités de Technologie / Polytechs

The universities of technology (French: universités de technologie) are public institutions awarding degrees and diplomas that are accredited by the French Ministry of Higher Education and Research. Although called "universities", the universities of technology are in fact non-university institutes (écoles extérieures aux universités), as defined by Chapter I, Section II (Articles 34 through 36) of French law 84-52 of 26 January 1984 regarding higher education (the loi Savary).

They are able to combine all the assets of the engineering Grandes Écoles and those of universities as they work towards three missions: Education, Research, Transfer of technology. They maintain close links with the industrial world both on national and international levels and they are known for their ability to innovate, adapt and provide an education that matches the current status of industry.

This network includes three institutions:

- The University of Technology of Belfort-Montbéliard (Université de Technologie de Belfort-Montbéliard or UTBM)
- The University of Technology of Compiègne (Université de Technologie de Compiègne or UTC)
- The University of Technology of Troyes (Université de Technologie de Troyes or UTT)

'Polytech institutes', embedded as a part of eleven French universities provide both undergraduate and graduate engineering curricula.

In the French-speaking part of Switzerland exists also the term haute école specialisée for a type of institution called Fachhochschule in the German-speaking part of the country. (see below).

Écoles polytechniques

Higher education systems, that are influenced by the French education system set at the end of the 18th century, use a terminology derived by reference to the French École polytechnique. Such terms include Écoles Polytechniques (Algeria, Belgium, Canada, France, Switzerland, Tunisia), Escola Politécnica (Brasil, Spain), Polytechnicum (Eastern Europe).

In French language, higher education refers to écoles polytechniques, providing science and engineering curricula:

- École polytechnique or X (near Paris)
- École polytechnique de Bruxelles
- École polytechnique de Montréal
- École polytechnique fédérale de Lausanne
- National Polytechnic Institute of Lorraine
- National Polytechnic Institute of Toulouse

=== Germany ===
Fachhochschule

Fachhochschulen were first founded in the early 1970s. They do not focus exclusively on technology, but may also offer courses in social science, business and design. They grant bachelor's degrees and master's degrees and focus more on teaching than research and more on specific professions than on science.

In 2009/10, there existed about 200 Fachhochschulen in Germany. See the German Wikipedia for a list.

Technische Universität

Technische Universität (abbreviation: TU) is the common term for universities of technology. These institutions can grant habilitation and doctoral degrees and focus on research.

The nine largest and most renowned Technische Universitäten in Germany have formed TU9 German Institutes of Technology as community of interests. Technische Universitäten normally have faculties or departements of natural sciences and often of economics but can also have units of cultural and social sciences and arts. RWTH Aachen University, TU Dresden and the Technical University of Munich also have a faculty of medicine associated with university hospitals (Klinikum Aachen, University Hospital Dresden, Rechts der Isar Hospital).

There are 20 universities of technology in Germany with about 290,000 students enrolled. The three states of Bremen, Mecklenburg-Vorpommern and Schleswig-Holstein do not have a Technische Universität. Saxony and Lower Saxony have the highest counts of TUs, while in Saxony three out of four universities are universities of technology. In addition to this, ordinary universities can also offer technical degree programs or focus on technical disciplines in research and education without bearing the title of a technical university.

List of Technische Universitäten in Germany
Name	Land	Foundation	Students	Notes
RWTH Aachen University	North Rhine-Westphalia	1870	44,517	member of TU9
Technische Universität Berlin	Berlin	1770	34,428	member of TU9
Brandenburg University of Technology	Brandenburg	1991	6,400	in Cottbus
Technische Universität Braunschweig (Braunschweig University of Technology); Carolo-Wilhelmina	Lower Saxony	1745	20,000	member of TU9, oldest TU in Germany
Chemnitz University of Technology	Saxony	1836	10,850	
Clausthal University of Technology	Lower Saxony	1775	4,080	
Technische Universität Darmstadt (Darmstadt University of Technology)	Hesse	1877	23,100	member of TU9
Technische Universität Dresden (Dresden University of Technology)	Saxony	1828	36,534	member of TU9
TU Dortmund University	North Rhine-Westphalia	1968	24,873	
Freiberg University of Mining and Technology	Saxony	1765	5,000	the world's oldest university of mining
Technische Universität Hamburg (University of Technology Hamburg)	Hamburg	1978	7,600	
HafenCity Universität Hamburg (HafenCity University Hamburg)	Hamburg	2006	2,500	
Leibniz University Hannover	Lower Saxony	1831	26,035	member of TU9
Technische Universität Ilmenau	Thuringia	1894	7,200	
Rheinland-Pfälzische Technische Universität Kaiserslautern-Landau	Rhineland-Palatinate	1970	20,000	
Karlsruhe Institute of Technology; Fridericiana	Baden-Württemberg	1825	22,552	member of TU9
Technical University of Munich	Bavaria	1868	38,000	member of TU9
University of Stuttgart	Baden-Württemberg	1829	22,632	member of TU9
Otto von Guericke University Magdeburg	Saxony-Anhalt	1993	12,833	
University of Technology Nuremberg	Bavaria	2021	8	under construction

=== Greece ===
Greece has Technical Universities (also known as Polytechnic Universities) with 5 years of study legally equivalent to Bachelor's and master's degree 300 ECTS, ISCED 7 and has the full professional rights of the Engineer. and had Technological Educational Institutes (TEIs) (1982–2019) also known as Higher Educational Institute of Technology, Technological Institute, Institute of Technology (provides at least 4-year undergraduate degree qualification πτυχίο, Latinised version: Ptychion, in line with the Bologna Process legally equivalent to Bachelor's honours degree 240 ECTS, ISCED 6. Previously it was three and a half years studies from 1983 to 1995, 210 ECTS). All the Technical Universities and Technological Educational Institutes are Higher Education Institutions (HEIs) with university title (UT) and degree awarding powers (DAPs). TEIs existed from 1983 to 2019; they were reformed between 2013 and 2019 and their departments incorporated into existing higher education institutions (HEIs).

The two Polytechnic Universities (Technical Universities) in Greece (Greek: Πολυτεχνείο) are the National Technical University of Athens and the Technical University of Crete. However, many other universities have a faculty of engineering that provides an equivalent diploma of engineerings with an integrated master and the full professional rights as well.

Many TEIs that got dismantled created engineering faculty with 5 years of study and 300 ECTS, ISCED 6. But those faculty are not under the general term of Polytechnics nor they have an integrated master's degree yet waiting evaluation to be characterised as equivalent. These have been named School of Engineers for the time being and not Technical Universities or Polytechnic.

In Greece, all Higher Education Institutions (HEIs) are public university owned and government-funded, with free education undergraduate programmes that can be attended without any payment of tuition fee. About 1 out of 4 (one-fourth of) HEIs postgraduate programmes are offered free without any payment of tuition fee, especially about a 30% percentage of students can be entitled without tuition fee to attend all the HEIs statutory tuition fee postgraduate programmes after they be assessed on an individual basis of determined criteria as set out in the Ministry of Education.

=== Hong Kong ===
The first polytechnic in Hong Kong is The Hong Kong Polytechnic, established in 1972 through upgrading the Hong Kong Technical College (Government Trade School before 1947). The second polytechnic, the City Polytechnic of Hong Kong, was founded in 1984. These polytechnics awards diplomas, higher diplomas, as well as academic degrees. Like the United Kingdom, the two polytechnics were granted university status in 1994 and renamed The Hong Kong Polytechnic University and the City University of Hong Kong respectively. The Hong Kong University of Science and Technology, a university with a focus in applied science, engineering and business, was founded in 1991.

=== Hungary ===
The world's first Institute of Technology the Berg-Schola (Bergschule) established in Selmecbánya, Kingdom of Hungary, by the Court Chamber of Vienna in 1735 providing further education to train specialists of precious metal and copper mining. In 1762 the institute ranked up to be Academia providing higher education courses. After the Treaty of Trianon the institute had to be moved to Sopron.

- University of Miskolc re-established in 1949 as Technical University of Heavy Industry in Miskolc and in 1990 as University of Miskolc. The university is the successor of the University of Mining and Metallurgy of Selmecbánya (est. as Bergshule 1735).
- Budapest University of Technology and Economics, one of the oldest institute of technology of the world is located in Budapest (est. 1782). The BME was the first University in Europe to award engineering degrees.
- University of Debrecen – Faculty of Engineering
- University of Dunaújváros
- Pallasz Athéné University – GAMF
- University of Nyíregyháza – Institute of Technical and Agricultural Sciences
- University of Sopron – The university is a successor of the University of Mining and Metallurgy of Selmecbánya (est. as Bergshule 1735).
- University of Szeged – Faculty of Engineering
- Szent István University
- Széchenyi István University
- University of Pannonia
- University of Pécs – Faculty of Engineering and Information Technology
- Óbuda University

=== India ===
There are Indian Institutes of Technology, Indian Institutes of Information Technology, and National Institutes of Technology in India which are autonomous public institutions. These institutions are Institutes of National Importance, and hence each of the institutions are autonomous. All Indian Institutes of Technology, Indian Institutes of Information Technology, and National Institutes of Technology have their own councils which are headed by President of India. The activities of these institutions are generally governed by the institutes alone, but sometimes they are bound to follow the directives of Ministry of Education (India) and are answerable to Ministry of Education (India) and President of India. Some departments of some of these institutions are bound to follow certain guidelines of National Board of Accreditation (NBA) if they receive the accreditation from NBA. However, unlike other institutions, it is not mandatory for these institutes to follow guidelines of All India Council for Technical Education (AICTE) and NBA completely.

The authority controlling technical education, other than the Institutes of National Importance, in India is All India Council for Technical Education (AICTE) and National Board of Accreditation (NBA).

=== Indonesia ===
There are four public institutes of technology in Indonesia that are owned by the government of Indonesia. Other than that, there are hundreds of other institutes that are owned by private or other institutions.

Four public institutes are:

- Bandung Institute of Technology, Bandung
- Sepuluh Nopember Institute of Technology, Surabaya
- Kalimantan Institute of Technology, Balikpapan
- Sumatera Institute of Technology, Bandar Lampung

Public state-owned polytechnics also available and provides vocational education offers either three-year Diploma degrees, which is similar to an associate degree or four-year bachelor's degree in applied sciences (Indonesian: Sarjana Terapan). The more advanced vocational Master's are also available and doctoral degrees are still in progress.

Some notable polytechnics in Indonesia includes State Polytechnic of Jakarta, State Polytechnic of Bandung, State Polytechnic of Malang, State Electronics Polytechnic of Surabaya, and State Naval and Shipbuilding Polytechnic of Surabaya. These polytechnics are known to break away from Indonesian prestigious universities and institute of technologies, e.g. the State Polytechnic of Jakarta sectioned off from the University of Indonesia while both Surabaya polytechnics separated from Sepuluh Nopember Institute of Technology.

=== Iran ===
There are 18 technological universities in Iran.

- Amirkabir University of Technology (Tehran Polytechnic), Tehran
- Sharif University of Technology, Tehran
- Technical and Vocational University, 172 branches in Iran
- Iran University of Science and Technology, Tehran
- K. N. Toosi University of Technology, Tehran
- Petroleum University of Technology, Tehran and Ahwaz
- Isfahan University of Technology, Isfahan
- Sahand University of Technology, Tabriz
- Shiraz University of Technology, Shiraz
- Arak University of Technology, Arak
- Urmia University of Technology, Urmia
- Babol University of Technology, Babol
- Shahrood University of Technology, Shahrood
- Hamedan University of Technology, Hamedan
- Kermanshah University of Technology, Kermanshah
- Qom University of Technology, Qom
- Birjand University of Technology, Birjand
- Jondi-Shapur University of Technology, Dezful
- Sirjan University of Technology, Sirjan

=== Iraq ===
- University of Technology, Iraq

=== Ireland ===
An "Institute of Technology" was formerly referred to as Regional Technical College (RTCs) system. The abbreviation IT is now widely used to refer to an Institute of Technology. These institutions offer sub-degree, degree and masters level studies. Unlike the Irish university system an Institute of Technology also offers sub-degree programmes such as 2-year Higher Certificate programme in various academic fields of study. Some institutions have "delegated authority" that allows them to make doctoral awards in their own name, after authorisation by the Quality and Qualifications Ireland.

Dublin Institute of Technology developed separately from the Regional Technical College system and after several decades of association with the University of Dublin it acquired the authority to confer its own degrees before becoming a member ofTU Dublin.

The approval of Ireland's first Technological University, TU Dublin was announced in July 2018 and the new university established on 1 January 2019. It is the result of a merger of three of the ITs in the County Dublin area - Dublin Institute of Technology, IT Tallaght and IT Blanchardstown. Several Technological Universities have since been set up in the country. Munster TU was established 1 January 2021 through a merger of Cork IT and IT Tralee (Kerry). The Technological University of the Shannon: Midlands Midwest was the third such university, established in October 2021 out of Limerick IT and Athlone IT. The Atlantic Technological University was formally established on 1 April 2022 out of Galway-Mayo IT, IT Sligo, and Letterkenny IT. As a fifth such institution, the South East Technological University was established on 1 May 2022 out of Carlow IT and Waterford IT. As of May 2023, the only remaining Institutes of Technology in Ireland are Dundalk IT and the Dun Laoghaire Institute of Art, Design and Technology.

The Technological Higher Education Association is the representative body for the various Institutes of Technology in Ireland.

=== Israel ===
- Technion – Israel Institute of Technology
- Holon Institute of Technology

=== Italy ===
In Italy, the term "technical institute" generally refers to a secondary school which offers a five-year course granting the access to the university system.

In higher education, Politecnico refers to a technical university awarding bachelor, master and PhD degrees in engineering. Historically there were two Politecnici, one in each of the two largest industrial cities of the north:

- Politecnico di Torino, established 1859;
- Politecnico di Milano, established 1863.

A third Politecnico was added in the south in 1990:

- Politecnico di Bari, established 1990.

In 2003 the Libera Università di Ancona becomes:

- Università Politecnica delle Marche (Polytechnic University of the Marches).

However, many other universities have a faculty of engineering.

In 2003, the Ministry of Education, Universities and Research (Italy) and the Ministry of Economy and Finance (Italy) jointly established the Istituto Italiano di Tecnologia (Italian Institute of Technology), headquartered in Genoa with 10 laboratories around Italy, which however focuses on research, not entirely in the fields of engineering and does not offer undergraduate degrees.

=== Jamaica ===
- University of Technology, Jamaica, in Kingston, Jamaica

=== Japan ===
In Japan, an institute of technology (工業大学, kōgyō daigaku) is a type of university that specializes in the sciences. See also the Imperial College of Engineering, which was the forerunner of the University of Tokyo's engineering faculty.

National

- Tokyo Institute of Technology, 1929
- Kyoto Institute of Technology, 1949
- Muroran Institute of Technology, 1949
- Nagoya Institute of Technology, 1949
- Kyushu Institute of Technology, 1949
- University of Electro-Communications, 1949
- Tokyo University of Agriculture and Technology, 1949
- Kitami Institute of Technology, 1966
- Nagaoka University of Technology, 1976
- Japan Advanced Institute of Science And Technology, 1986
- Nara Institute of Science and Technology, 2006
- Okinawa Institute of Science and Technology, 2011

Public

- Tokyo Metropolitan Institute of Technology, 1986
- Maebashi Institute of Technology, 1997
- Kochi University of Technology, 1997
- Advanced Institute of Industrial Technology, 2006

Private

- Chiba Institute of Technology, 1942
- Osaka Institute of Technology, 1949
- Shibaura Institute of Technology, 1949
- Tokyo Polytechnic University, 1950
- Kobe Institute of Computing, 1958
- Aichi Institute of Technology, 1959
- Hiroshima Institute of Technology, 1963
- Fukuoka Institute of Technology, 1963
- Shonan Institute of Technology, 1963
- Tohoku Institute of Technology, 1964
- Kanazawa Institute of Technology, 1965
- Fukui University of Technology, 1965
- Nippon Institute of Technology, 1967
- Hokkaido Institute of Technology, 1967
- Ashikaga Institute of Technology, 1967
- Hachinohe Technical University, 1972
- Kanagawa Institute of Technology, 1975
- Toyohashi University of Technology, 1976
- Saitama Institute of Technology, 1976
- Tokyo University of Technology, 1986
- Kobe Design University, 1989
- Tohoku University of Art and Design, 1991
- Shizuoka Institute of Science and Technology, 1991
- Niigata Institute of Technology, 1995
- Aichi University of Technology, 2000

=== Kenya ===
In Kenya, Technical Universities are special Universities that focus on technical and engineering courses and offer certifications in the same from Artisan, Craft, Diploma, Higher Diploma, Degree, Masters and Doctorate levels. They are former national polytechnics and are the only institutions of learning that offer the complete spectrum of tertiary education programs. They Include

- Technical University of Kenya, Formerly Kenya National Polytechnic in Nairobi
- Technical University of Mombasa, Formerly Mombasa National Polytechnic in Mombasa

=== Jordan ===
- Princess Sumaya University for Technology in Amman
- Jordan University of Science and Technology in Irbid
- Balqa Applied University in Salt
- Tafila Technical University in Tafila

=== Macau ===
The first polytechnic in Macau is the Polytechnic Institute of the University of East Asia which was established in 1981, as an institute of a private university. In 1991, following the splitting of the University of East Asia into three (University of Macau, Macao Polytechnic Institute, Asia International Open University), a public and independent Polytechnic Institute, Macao Polytechnic Institute, was officially established. The first private technology university Macau University of Science and Technology is established in 2000. Macao Polytechnic Institute has renamed Macao Polytechnic University in 2022.

=== Malaysia ===
Polytechnics

Polytechnics in Malaysia have been in operation since 1969. These institutions offer courses at the special skills certificate, diploma, advanced diploma, and undergraduate levels. The first polytechnic in Malaysia, Politeknik Ungku Omar, was established by the Ministry of Education in 1969 with the help of UNESCO and the amount of RM24.5 million from the United Nations Development Program (UNDP).

At present, Malaysia has 36 polytechnics all over the country offering courses in fields such as engineering, agriculture, commerce, hospitality and design.

The following is a list of the polytechnics in Malaysia in order of establishment:

No.	Official name in Malay	Acronym	Foundation	Type	Location
1	Politeknik Ungku Omar	PUO	1969	Premier Polytechnic (University Status)	Ipoh, Perak
2	Politeknik Sultan Haji Ahmad Shah	POLISAS	1976	Conventional Polytechnic	Kuantan, Pahang
3	Politeknik Sultan Abdul Halim Muadzam Shah	POLIMAS	1984	Conventional Polytechnic	Jitra, Kedah
4	Politeknik Kota Bharu	PKB	1985	Conventional Polytechnic	Ketereh, Kelantan
5	Politeknik Kuching	PKS	1987	Conventional Polytechnic	Kuching, Sarawak
6	Politeknik Port Dickson	PPD	1990	Conventional Polytechnic	Si Rusa, Negeri Sembilan
7	Politeknik Kota Kinabalu	PKK	1996	Conventional Polytechnic	Kota Kinabalu, Sabah
8	Politeknik Sultan Salahuddin Abdul Aziz Shah	PSA	1997	Premier Polytechnic (University Status)	Shah Alam, Selangor
9	Politeknik Ibrahim Sultan	PIS	1998	Premier Polytechnic (University Status)	Pasir Gudang, Johor
10	Politeknik Seberang Perai	PSP	1998	Conventional Polytechnic	Permatang Pauh, Pulau Pinang
11	Politeknik Melaka	PMK	1999	Conventional Polytechnic	Melaka
12	Politeknik Kuala Terengganu	PKKT	1999	Conventional Polytechnic	Kuala Terengganu, Terengganu
13	Politeknik Sultan Mizan Zainal Abidin	PSMZA	2001	Conventional Polytechnic	Dungun, Terengganu
14	Politeknik Merlimau	PMM	2002	Conventional Polytechnic	Merlimau, Melaka
15	Politeknik Sultan Azlan Shah	PSAS	2002	Conventional Polytechnic	Behrang, Perak
16	Politeknik Tuanku Sultanah Bahiyah	PTSB	2002	Conventional Polytechnic	Kulim, Kedah
17	Politeknik Sultan Idris Shah	PSIS	2003	Conventional Polytechnic	Sungai Air Tawar, Selangor
18	Politeknik Tuanku Syed Sirajuddin	PTSS	2003	Conventional Polytechnic	Arau, Perlis
19	Politeknik Muadzam Shah	PMS	2003	Conventional Polytechnic	Muadzam Shah, Pahang
20	Politeknik Mukah	PMU	2004	Conventional Polytechnic	Mukah, Sarawak
21	Politeknik Balik Pulau	PBU	2007	Conventional Polytechnic	Balik Pulau, Pulau Pinang
22	Politeknik Jeli	PJK	2007	Conventional Polytechnic	Jeli, Kelantan
23	Politeknik Nilai	PNS	2007	Conventional Polytechnic	Nilai, Negeri Sembilan
24	Politeknik Banting	PBS	2007	Conventional Polytechnic	Kuala Langat, Selangor
25	Politeknik Mersing	PMJ	2008	Conventional Polytechnic	Mersing, Johor
26	Politeknik Hulu Terengganu	PHT	2008	Conventional Polytechnic	Kuala Berang, Terengganu
27	Politeknik Sandakan	PSS	2009	Conventional Polytechnic	Sandakan, Sabah
28	Politeknik METrO Kuala Lumpur	PMKL	2011	METrO Polytechnic	Kuala Lumpur
29	Politeknik METrO Kuantan	PMKU	2011	METrO Polytechnic	Kuantan, Pahang
30	Politeknik METrO Johor Bahru	PMJB	2011	METrO Polytechnic	Johor Bahru, Johor
31	Politeknik METrO Betong	PMBS	2012	METrO Polytechnic	Betong, Sarawak
32	Politeknik METrO Tasek Gelugor	PMTG	2012	METrO Polytechnic	George Town, Pulau Pinang
33	Politeknik Tun Syed Nasir	PTSN	2014	Conventional Polytechnic	Muar, Johor
34	Politeknik Besut	PoliBesut	2014	Conventional Polytechnic	Besut, Terengganu
35	Politeknik Bagan Datuk	PBD	2017	Conventional Polytechnic	Bagan Datuk, Perak
36	Politeknik Tawau	PTS	2017	Conventional Polytechnic	Tawau, Sabah

Technical University

There are four technical universities in Malaysia, all of which are part of the Malaysian Technical University Network:

- Universiti Tun Hussein Onn Malaysia
- Universiti Malaysia Perlis
- Universiti Teknikal Malaysia Melaka
- Universiti Malaysia Pahang

=== Mauritius ===
The only technical university in Mauritius is the University of Technology, Mauritius with its main campus situated in La Tour Koenig, Pointe aux Sables.

=== Mexico ===
In Mexico there are different Institutes and Colleges of Technology. Most of them are public institutions.

The National Technological Institute of Mexico (in Spanish: Tecnológico Nacional de México, TecNM) is a Mexican public university system created on 23 July 2014 by presidential decree with the purpose to unify 263 public institutes of technology that had been created since 1948 and are found all around Mexico.

Another important institute of technology in Mexico is the National Polytechnic Institute (Instituto Politécnico Nacional), which is located in the northern region of Mexico City.

=== Moldova ===
- Technical University of Moldova

=== Nepal ===
- Institute of Engineering
- CTEVT, Council for Technical Education and Vocational Training

=== New Zealand ===
New Zealand polytechnics are established under the Education Act 1989 as amended and are typically considered state-owned tertiary institutions along with universities, colleges of education and wānanga; there is today often much crossover in courses and qualifications offered between all these types of Tertiary Education Institutions. Some have officially taken the title 'institute of technology' which is a term recognized in government strategies equal to that of the term 'polytechnic'. One has opted for the name 'Universal College of Learning' (UCOL) and another 'Unitec New Zealand'. These are legal names but not recognized terms like 'polytechnic' or 'institute of technology'. Many if not all now grant at least bachelor-level degrees. Some colleges of education or institutes of technology are privately owned, however, the qualification levels vary widely.

Since the 1990s, there has been consolidation in New Zealand's state-owned tertiary education system. In the polytechnic sector: Wellington Polytechnic amalgamated with Massey University. The Central Institute of Technology explored a merger with the Waikato Institute of Technology, which was abandoned, but later, after financial concerns, controversially amalgamated with Hutt Valley Polytechnic, which in turn became Wellington Institute of Technology. Some smaller polytechnics in the North Island, such as Waiarapa Polytechnic, amalgamated with UCOL. (The only other amalgamations have been in the colleges of education.)

The Auckland University of Technology is the only polytechnic to have been elevated to university status; while Unitec has had repeated attempts blocked by government policy and consequent decisions; Unitec has not been able to convince the courts to overturn these decisions.

In mid-February 2019, the Minister of Education Minister Chris Hipkins proposed merging the country's sixteen polytechnics into a "NZ Institute of Skills and Technology" in response to deficits and a decline in domestic enrollments. This was commenced with branding changes to 20 establishments in 2022 in preparation of their merger into Te Pūkenga

=== Nigeria ===
Virtually, every state in Nigeria has a polytechnic university operated by either the federal or state government. In Rivers State for example, there are two state-owned polytechnic universities; Kenule Beeson Saro-Wiwa Polytechnic, Bori City and the Rivers State College of Arts and Science, Port Harcourt. The former was established on 13 May 1988 while the latter–though founded in 1984–was approved by the NBTE in 2006. The first private polytechnic university in the state is the Eastern Polytechnic, established in 2008.

=== Pakistan ===
The polytechnic institutes in Pakistan offer Diploma in Engineering spanning three years in different engineering branches. This diploma is known as Diploma of Associate Engineering (DAE). Students are admitted to the diploma program based on their results in the 10th grade standardized exams. The main purpose of the diploma offered in polytechnic institutes is to train people in various trades.

These institutes are located throughout Pakistan and started in the early 1950s.

After successfully completion of diploma at a polytechnic, students can either get employment or enroll in Bachelor of Technology (B.Tech.) and Bachelor of Engineering (BE) degree programs.

Universities of Engineering & Technology in Pakistan offer undergraduate (BE/BS/BSc Engineering) and postgraduate (ME/MS/MSc Engineering and PhD) degree programs in engineering. BE/BS/BSc Engineering is a professional degree in Pakistan. It is a four-year full-time program after HSSC (higher secondary school certificate).

=== Palestine ===
University College of Applied Sciences (UCAS) is a technical college in Gaza founded in 1998. The college offers undergraduate degrees in several unique specializations such as education technology, technological management and planning, and geographic information systems

=== Philippines ===
- Mapúa University, the premier engineering school of the Philippines. Being an internationally accredited engineering school, it consistently tops various board exams for engineering students in the Philippines.
- FEU Institute of Technology, a premier engineering school known for its technological academic teaching and board topnotchers operating under the Far Eastern University system.
- Mindanao State University–Iligan Institute of Technology, the premier state university in the southern Philippines and the science and technology flagship campus of the Mindanao State University System (the second biggest university system in the Philippines after the University of the Philippines).
- Technological University of the Philippines, the premier state university of technology education in the Philippines.
- Technological Institute of the Philippines, an engineering school with an international accreditation.
- Bicol University, center in teaching excellence, offers IT courses and a well known university.
- Cebu Institute of Technology – University, a premier engineering school, this university is known to have high selectivity in admissions as well as excellence in engineering research and education.
- Cebu Technological University
- Polytechnic University of the Philippines, a state university in the Philippines that consistently tops various board exams for engineering students in the Philippines, also referred to as the National Comprehensive University of the Philippines.
- Quezon City Polytechnic University, a local university, this university is well known in engineering, IT and technical education.
- Rizal Technological University, the only university that offers degree courses in astronomy.

=== Poland ===
Politechnika (translated as a "technical university" or "university of technology") is the designation of a technical university in Poland. Here are some of the larger polytechnics in Poland:

- Politechnika Śląska
- Politechnika Wrocławska
- Politechnika Warszawska
- Politechnika Poznańska
- Politechnika Krakowska
- Politechnika Gdańska
- Politechnika Łódzka
- Politechnika Białostocka
- Politechnika Lubelska

Other polytechnic universities:

- Akademia Górniczo-Hutnicza
- Uniwersytet Technologiczno-Przyrodniczy im. Jana i Jędrzeja Śniadeckich w Bydgoszczy (University of Technology and Life Sciences in Bydgoszcz)
- Zachodniopomorski Uniwersytet Technologiczny (West Pomeranian University of Technology)

=== Portugal ===
Till recently, there was a Technical University of Lisbon (UTL). It included several of the most prestigious schools, including, an engineering school (Instituto Superior Tecnico) and one of the most ancient business schools in the world (ISEG Lisbon). But UTL merged with the University of Lisbon. In this field, here are also a number of non-university higher educational institutions which are called polytechnic institutes since the 1970s. Some of these institutions existed since the 19th century with different designations (industrial and commercial institutes, agricultural managers, elementary teachers and nurses schools, etc.). In theory, the polytechnics higher education system is aimed to provide a more practical training and be profession-oriented, while the university higher education system is aimed to have a stronger theoretical basis and be highly research-oriented. The polytechnics are also oriented to provide shorter length studies aimed to respond to local needs. The Portuguese polytechnics can then be compared to the US community colleges.

Since the implementation of Bologna Process in Portugal in 2007, the polytechnics offer the 1st cycle (licentiate degree) and 2nd cycle (master's degree) of higher studies. Until 1998, the polytechnics only awarded bachelor (Portuguese: bacharelato) degrees (three-year short-cycle degrees) and were not authorized to award higher degrees. They however granted post-bachelor diplomas in specialized higher studies (DESE, diploma de estudos superiores especializados), that could be obtained after the conclusion of a two-year second cycle of studies and were academical equivalent to the university's licentiate degrees (licenciatura). After 1998, they started to be allowed to confer their own licentiate degrees, which replaced the DESE diplomas.

=== Romania ===
- Politehnica University of Bucharest, 1864
- Polytechnic University of Timișoara, 1920
- Gheorghe Asachi Technical University of Iași, 1937
- Technical University of Cluj-Napoca, 1948
- Technical University of Civil Engineering of Bucharest, 1948
- Oil & Gas University of Ploieşti, 1948
- University of Petroşani, 1948
- Technical Military Academy of Bucharest, 1949

=== Russia ===
- Bauman Moscow State Technical University
- Saint Petersburg Polytechnical University
- Novosibirsk State Technical University
- Tomsk Polytechnic University
- Moscow Polytechnic University
- Moscow Institute of Physics and Technology

=== Singapore ===
Polytechnics in Singapore do not offer bachelor's, master's degrees or doctorate, instead offering three-year diploma courses in fields ranging from applied sciences to business, information technology, humanities, social sciences, and other vocational fields such as engineering and nursing. There are five polytechnics in Singapore: Singapore Polytechnic, Ngee Ann Polytechnic, Temasek Polytechnic, Nanyang Polytechnic and Republic Polytechnic.

The Polytechnic diploma certification in Singapore is equivalent to an associate degree obtainable at the community colleges in the United States. A Polytechnic diploma in Singapore is also known to be parallel and sometimes equivalent to the first years at a bachelor's degree-granting institution, thus, Polytechnic graduates in Singapore have the privilege of being granted transfer credits or module exemptions when they apply to a local or overseas universities, depending on the university's policies on transfer credits.

The only university in Singapore with the term "institute of technology", most notably the Singapore Institute of Technology were developed in 2009 as an option for Polytechnic graduates who desire to pursue a bachelor's degree. Other technological universities in Singapore includes the Nanyang Technological University and the Singapore University of Technology and Design.

=== Slovakia ===
- Slovak University of Technology in Bratislava

The world's first institution of technology or technical university with tertiary technical education is the Banská Akadémia in Banská Štiavnica, Slovakia, founded in 1735, academy since December 13, 1762 established by queen Maria Theresa in order to train specialists of silver and gold mining and metallurgy in neighbourhood. Teaching started in 1764. Later the department of Mathematics, Mechanics and Hydraulics and department of Forestry were settled. University buildings are still at their place today and are used for teaching. University has launched the first book of electrotechnics in the world.

- Technical University of Košice
- University of Žilina
- Technical University in Zvolen
- Trenčín University in Trenčín
- Dubnica Technology Institute

=== South Africa ===
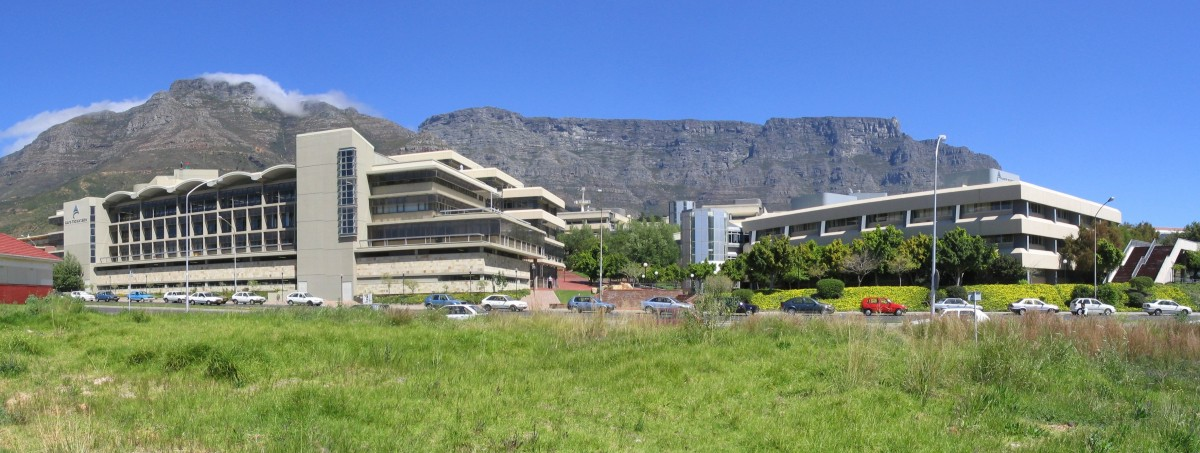
Cape Peninsula University of Technology was composed of two former technikons and other smaller independent colleges.

In South Africa, there was a division between universities and technikons (polytechnics), as well between institutions servicing particular racial and language groupings.

By the mid-2000s, former technikons have either been merged with traditional universities to form comprehensive universities or have become universities of technology; however, the universities of technology have not to date acquired all of the traditional rights and privileges of a university (such as the ability to confer a wide range of degrees).

=== Spain ===
- Universidad Politécnica de Madrid
- Universitat Politècnica de Catalunya
- Universitat Politècnica de València
- Universidad Politécnica de Cartagena

=== Sri Lanka ===
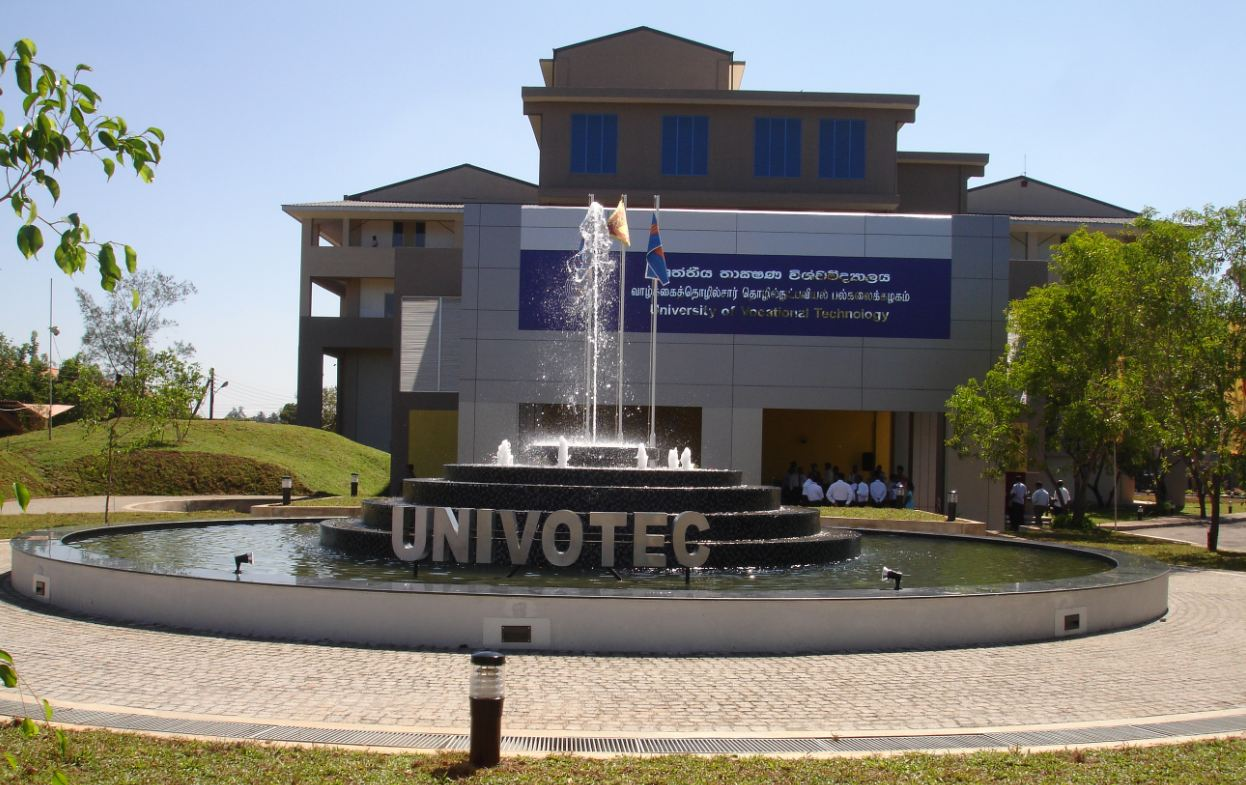
University of Vocational Technology Sri Lanka

- University of Moratuwa
- Institute of Technology, University of Moratuwa
- University of Vocational Technology
- Sri Lanka Institute of Information Technology
- Technical College

=== Sweden ===
- KTH Royal Institute of Technology, Stockholm
- Chalmers University of Technology, Gothenburg
- The Institute of Technology at Linköping University, Linköping
- Faculty of Engineering (LTH), Lund University, Lund
- Luleå University of Technology, Luleå
- Blekinge Institute of Technology, Blekinge

=== Switzerland ===
- Eidgenössische Technische Hochschule Zürich (ETH Zurich)
- École Polytechnique Fédérale de Lausanne (EPFL)

=== Taiwan ===
The question of Taiwanese college education is, the students either from high school (the aim is to go to normal college) or tech high school (the aim is to go to work or technology university), almost all of the students take the same test (the score can go to two kinds of school), and the school would not care what kind of high school you are from.

- National Taiwan University of Science and Technology
- National Taipei University of Technology
- National Taichung University of Science and Technology
- National Yunlin University of Science and Technology
- National Formosa University
- National Kaohsiung University of Science and Technology
- National Pingtung University of Science and Technology

=== Thailand ===
Most of Thailand's institutes of technology were developed from technical colleges, in the past could not grant bachelor's degrees; today, however, they are university level institutions, some of which can grant degrees to the doctoral level. Examples are Pathumwan Institute of Technology (developed from Pathumwan Technical School), King Mongkut's Institute of Technology Ladkrabang (Nondhaburi Telecommunications Training Centre) and King Mongkut's Institute of Technology North Bangkok (Thai-German Technical School).

There are two former institutes of technology, which already changed their name to "University of Technology": Rajamangala University of Technology (formerly Institute of Technology and Vocational Education) and King Mongkut's University of Technology Thonburi (Thonburi Technology Institute).

Institutes of technology with different origins are Asian Institute of Technology, which developed from SEATO Graduate School of Engineering and Sirindhorn International Institute of Technology, an engineering school of Thammasat University. Suranaree University of Technology is the only government-owned technological university in Thailand that was established (1989) as such; while Mahanakorn University of Technology is the most well known private technological institute.

A certain number of technical colleges in Thailand is associated with bitter rivalries which erupt into frequent off-campus brawls and assassinations of students in public locations that has been going on for nearly a decade, with innocent bystanders also commonly among the injured and the military under martial law still unable to stop them from occurring.

=== Turkey ===
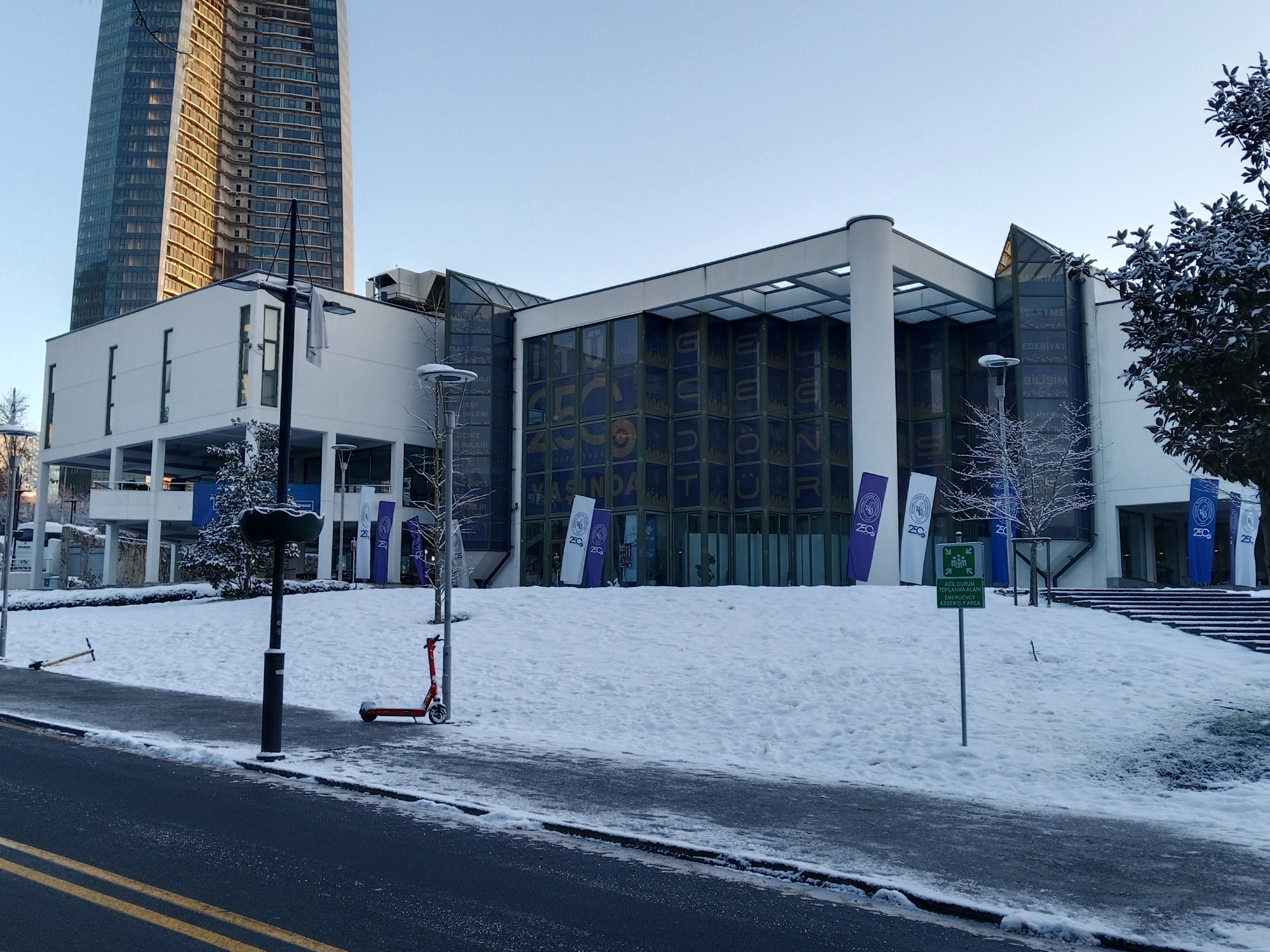
Istanbul Technical University Süleyman Demirel Cultural Center, Istanbul

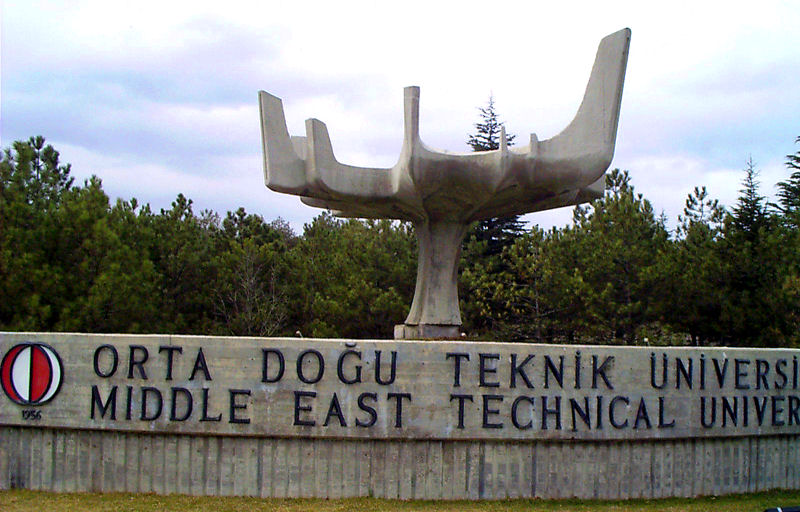
Statue of Tree of Science by the main entrance to Middle East Technical University campus in Ankara

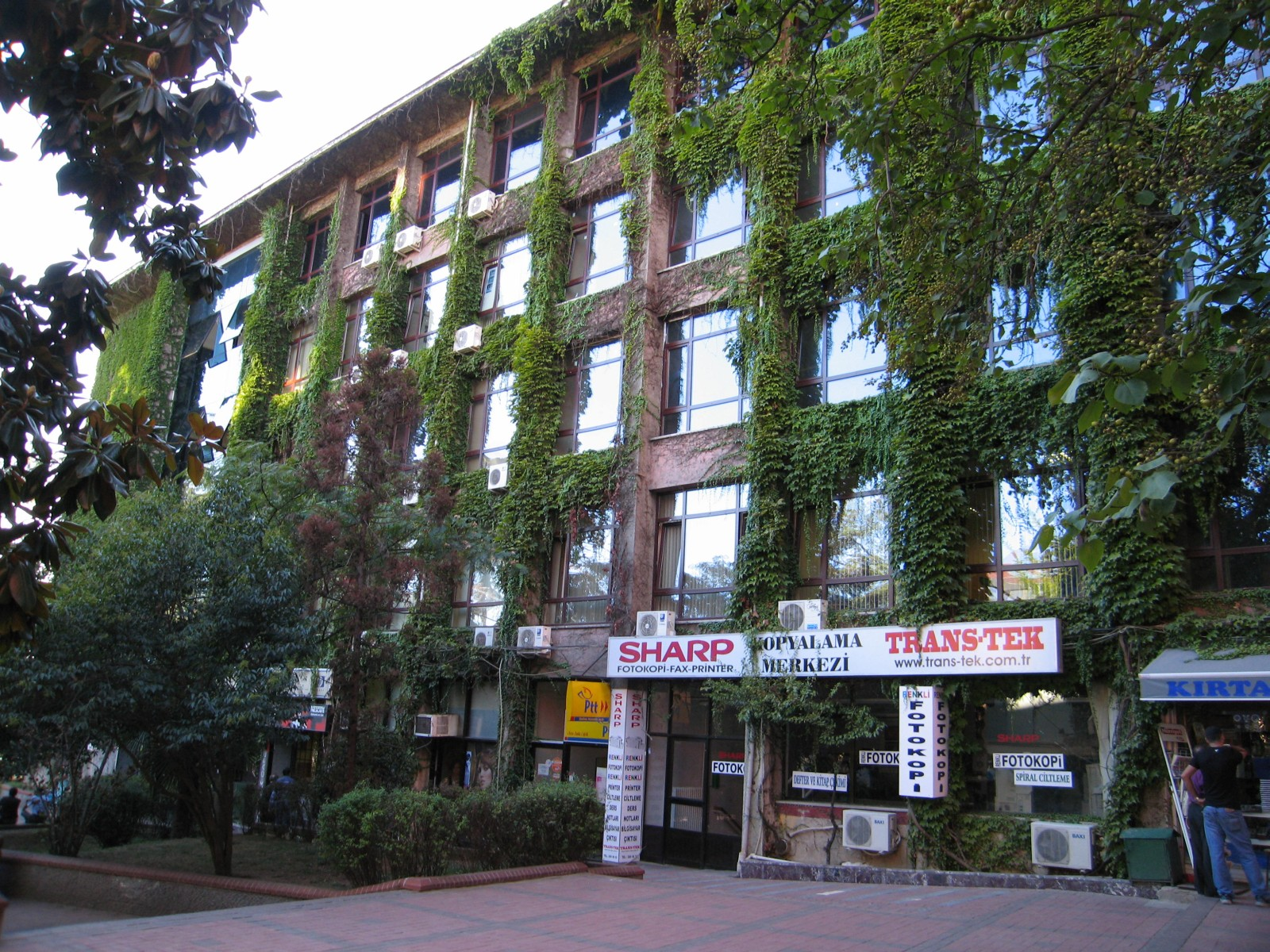
Yıldız Technical University, located in Beşiktaş, Istanbul

Entrance of Mechanical Engineering department, Karadeniz Technical University in Trabzon

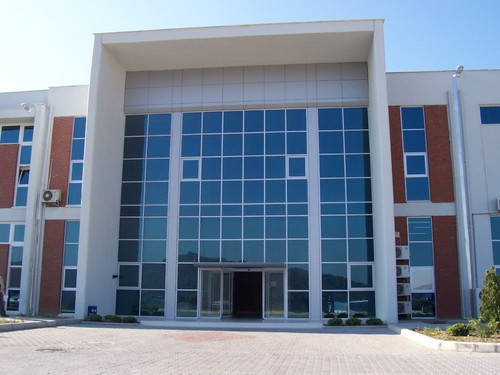
A-1 Building, İzmir Institute of Technology Teknopark

In Turkey, with historical roots extending back to the Ottoman Empire, Istanbul Technical University is recognized as the oldest technical university, established in 1773. Notably, Karadeniz Technical University in Trabzon was established in 1955. Middle East Technical University in Ankara followed closely, founded in 1956. More recent developments include the transformation of Yıldız University into Yıldız Technical University, along with the establishment of Gebze Technical University in Kocaeli, and İzmir Institute of Technology in İzmir. Additionally, the technical education landscape broadened with the founding of Bursa Technical University in Bursa in 2010.

List of Technical Universities in Turkey
Name	City	Foundation	Students	Notes
Istanbul Technical University (ITU)	Istanbul	1773	21000	Ranked 108th in the THES QS University ranking for technology fields.
Yıldız Technical University (YTU)	Istanbul	1911	21000	
Karadeniz Technical University (KTU)	Trabzon	1955		The first technical university established in Turkey outside of Istanbul.
Middle East Technical University (METU)	Ankara	1956	25089	METU is the first and only Turkish university to enter the Times Higher Education's THE World Reputation Rankings, ranking within the 51-60 band. Nationally, in the 2025 rankings, it was ranked first according to both THE and QS.
Gebze Technical University (GTU)	Kocaeli	1992		
İzmir Institute of Technology (IYTE)	İzmir	1992		
Bursa Technical University (BTU)	Bursa	2010		
Erzurum Technical University (ETU)	Erzurum	2010		
Adana Science and Technology University (ABTU)	Adana	2011		
Iskenderun Technical University (ISTE)	Hatay	2015		
OSTIM Technical University	Ankara	2017		It is the first and only private technical university in Turkey.
Konya Technical University (KTUN)	Konya	2018		
Eskişehir Technical University (ESTU)	Eskişehir	2018	12000+	

=== Ukraine ===
- Dnipro Polytechnic
- Donbas State Technical University
- Donetsk National Technical University
- Kyiv Polytechnic Institute
- Kharkiv Polytechnic Institute
- Lviv Polytechnic

=== United Kingdom ===
Institutes of Technology

The UK Government defines institutes of technology as "Business-led Institutes of Technology [that] offer higher level technical education to help close skills gaps in key STEM areas". They deliver qualifications from level 3 (T-levels) to level 7 (master's degrees). The government invested £300 million to develop a network of 21 institutes of technology across England, with the last two having opened to learners in September 2024.

Polytechnics

Polytechnics were tertiary education teaching institutions in England, Wales and Northern Ireland. The comparable institutions in Scotland were collectively referred to as central institutions.

From 1965 to 1992, UK polytechnics operated under the binary system of education along with universities. Polytechnics offered diplomas and degrees (bachelor's, master's, PhD) validated at the national level by the Council for National Academic Awards (CNAA). Initially they concentrated on engineering and applied science degree courses and other STEM subjects similar to technological universities in the US and continental Europe. Polytechnics were associated with innovations including women's studies, the academic study of communications and media, sandwich degrees and the rise of management and business studies.

Britain's first polytechnic, the Royal Polytechnic Institution later known as the Polytechnic of Central London (now the University of Westminster) was established in 1838 at Regent Street in London and its goal was to educate and popularize engineering and scientific knowledge and inventions in Victorian Britain "at little expense". The London Polytechnic led a mass movement to create numerous polytechnic institutes across the UK in the late 19th century. Most polytechnic institutes were established at the center of major metropolitan cities and their focus was on engineering, applied science and technology education.

The designation "institute of technology" was occasionally used by polytechnics (Bolton), Central Institutions (Dundee, Robert Gordon's) and for the Cranfield Institute of Technology (now Cranfield University), most of which later adopted the designation university and there were two "institutes of science and technology": UMIST and UWIST (part of the University of Wales). Loughborough University was called Loughborough University of Technology from 1966 to 1996, the only institution in the UK to have had such a designation. The University of Strathclyde was the Royal Technical College from 1912 to 1956 and then the Royal College of Science and Technology from 1956 until granted university status in 1964.

Polytechnics were granted university status under the Further and Higher Education Act 1992. This meant that polytechnics could confer degrees without the oversight of the national CNAA organization. These institutions are sometimes referred to as post-1992 universities.

Technical colleges

In 1956, some colleges of technology received the designation college of advanced technology. They became universities in 1966 meaning they could award their own degrees.

Institutions called "technical institutes" or "technical schools" that were formed in the early 20th century provided further education between high school and university or polytechnic. Most technical institutes have been merged into regional colleges and some have been designated university colleges if they are associated with a local university.

=== United States ===
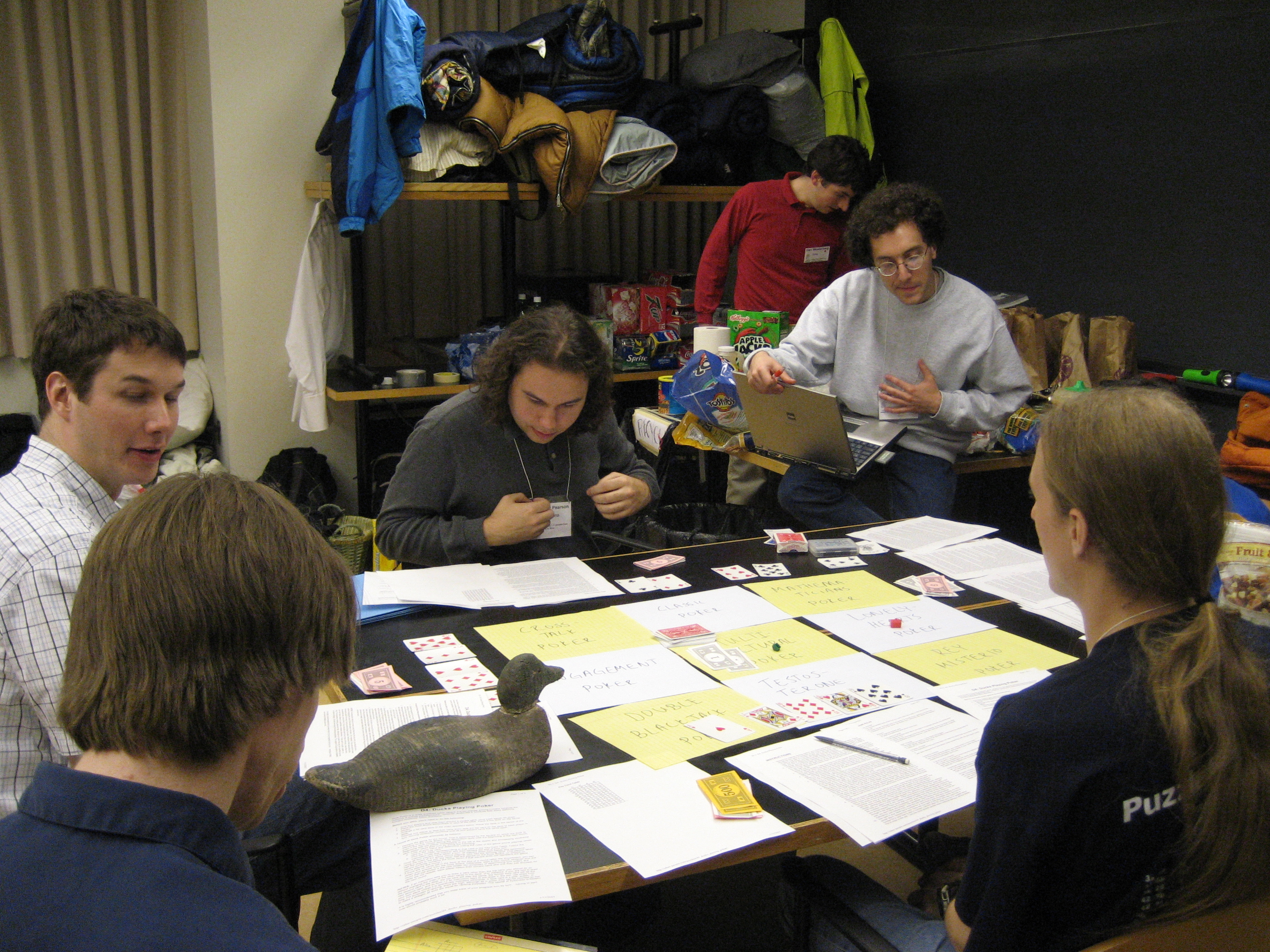
Students from the Massachusetts Institute of Technology

Polytechnic institutes in the USA are technological universities, many dating back to the mid-19th century. A handful of American universities include the phrases "Institute of Technology", "Polytechnic Institute", "Polytechnic University" or similar phrasing in their names; these are generally research-intensive universities with a focus on engineering, science and technology. Conversely, schools dubbed "technical colleges" or "technical institutes" generally provide post-secondary training in technical and mechanical fields, focusing on training vocational skills primarily at a community college level, parallel and sometimes equivalent to the first two years at a bachelor's degree-granting institution.

Some of America's earliest institutes of technology include Rensselaer Polytechnic Institute (1824), Rochester Institute of Technology (1829), Brooklyn Collegiate and Polytechnic Institute (1854), Massachusetts Institute of Technology (1861), and Worcester Polytechnic Institute (1865).

=== Venezuela ===
Institutes of technology in Venezuela were developed in the 1950s as an option for post-secondary education in technical and scientific courses, after the polytechnic French concepts. At that time, technical education was considered essential for the development of a sound middle class economy.

Nowadays, most of the Institutos de Tecnología are privately run businesses, with varying degrees of quality.

Most of these institutes award diplomas after three or three and a half years of education. The institute of technology implementation (IUT, from Spanish: Instituto universitario de tecnologia) began with the creation of the first IUT at Caracas, the capital city of Venezuela, called IUT. Dr. Federico Rivero Palacio adopted the French "Institut Universitaire de Technologie"s system, using French personnel and study system based on three-year periods, with research and engineering facilities at the same level as the main national universities to obtain French equivalent degrees. This IUT is the first and only one in Venezuela having French equivalent degrees accepted, implementing this system and observing the high-level degrees some other IUTs were created in Venezuela, regardless of this the term IUT was not used appropriately resulting in some institutions with mediocre quality and no equivalent degree in France. Later, some private institutions sprang up using IUT in their names, but they are not regulated by the original French system and award lower quality degrees.

=== Vietnam ===
- Da Nang University of Technology
- FPT University
- Hanoi University of Science and Technology
- Ho Chi Minh City University of Technology
- Le Quy Don Technical University
- VNU University of Engineering and Technology

== See also ==
- Comparison of US and UK Education
- Engineer's degree
- List of forestry universities and colleges
- List of institutions using the term "institute of technology" or "polytechnic"
- List of schools of mines
- Secondary Technical School
- University of Science and Technology
- Vocational university
