= Istanbul Medeniyet University =

Public university in İstanbul, Turkey

- İstanbul Medeniyet Üniversitesi
- Istanbul Medeniyet University emblem
- Motto: Üniversite Medeniyet'tir; Yeni Nesil Devlet Üniversitesi
- Motto in English: University is Civilization; A New Generation State University
- Type: Public university
- Established: 21 July 2010
- Founder: Turkish Parliament (TBMM)
- Affiliations: YÖK
- Rector: Prof. Dr. Gülfettin Çelik
- Academic staff: 1,081 (2023)
- Administrative staff: 397 (2023)
- Students: 13,310 (2023)
- Location: Dumlupınar Mah. D-100 Karayolu No:98 Kadıköy, Istanbul, Istanbul Province, Turkey; 40°59′43.98″N 29°3′45.03″E
- Language: Turkish, English
- Colors
- Mascot: 'IMU' (in Kufic calligraphy)
- Website: www.medeniyet.edu.tr

University rankings

Global – Overall
- THE World: 801-1000 (2022)

Regional – Overall
- QS Emerging Europe and Central Asia: 251-300 (2022)

Istanbul Medeniyet University (Turkish: İstanbul Medeniyet Üniversitesi) is a public university located on the Anatolian side of Istanbul, Turkey. It was established on 21 July 2010 as the 98th university of Turkey and the ninth state university in Istanbul, under Law No. 6005 published in the Official Gazette, along with 6 other universities. (Note: Yıldırım Beyazıt University, Bursa Technical University, İzmir Kâtip Çelebi University, Konya University, Kayseri Abdullah Gül University, and Erzurum Technical University)

The university has eleven faculties, two schools, three graduate institutes, and seventeen research centers. Its main campuses are in Üsküdar and Kadıköy, along the D100 highway.

== Library ==
The university hosts the Ziraat Bank Library, whose foundation was laid in November 2018 with the participation of President Recep Tayyip Erdoğan. The library is one of Turkey's largest, covering 28,000 square meters and is planned to serve with up to one million books.

== Campuses ==
- North Campus (Göztepe)
- South Campus (Ünalan)
- Cevizli Campus (Kartal)
- Orhanlı Campus (Tuzla)

== Academic units ==
=== Faculties ===
- Faculty of Medicine
- Faculty of Health Sciences
- Faculty of Engineering and Natural Sciences
- Faculty of Letters
- Faculty of Islamic Sciences
- Faculty of Political Sciences
- Faculty of Dentistry
- Faculty of Education Sciences
- Faculty of Law
- Faculty of Art, Design and Architecture
- Faculty of Tourism

=== Schools ===
- School of Foreign Languages
- School of Civil Aviation

=== Institutes ===
- Graduate Institute of Education
- Institute of History of Science
- Institute for the Study of Qur’anic Recitation and Mushaf

=== Research and Application Centers ===
- Center for Advanced Science and Technology
- Center for Child Education and Science
- Diabetes Research Center
- Center for Human Rights
- Center for Civilization Studies
- Autism Research Center
- Psychology Research Center
- Social Cooperation Center
- Continuing Education Center
- Hafiz-i Shirazi Iran Studies Center
- Turkish-Islamic Art and Archaeology Center
- Center for Teaching Turkish
- Distance Education Center
- Dentistry Research Center
- Africa Health Studies Center
- Laboratory for Experimental Animals
- Tobacco Analysis, Research and Development Laboratory
