= İzmir Kâtip Çelebi University =

Public university in İzmir, Turkey

Coordinates: 38.51525°N 27.03125°E

- İzmir Kâtip Çelebi Üniversitesi
- Motto: Farkındayız Farklıyız
- Motto in English: We are aware & different
- Type: Public
- Established: 21 July 2010
- Affiliations: CHE; CUA
- Rector: Prof. Dr. Saffet Köse
- Students: 18633
- Undergraduates: 14709
- Postgraduates: 2989
- Doctoral students: 495
- Location: Balatçık Mahallesi Havaalanı Şosesi No: 33/2 Çiğli, İzmir, Turkey
- Campus: Suburban
- Colors
- Mascot: Quill
- Website: ikcu.edu.tr

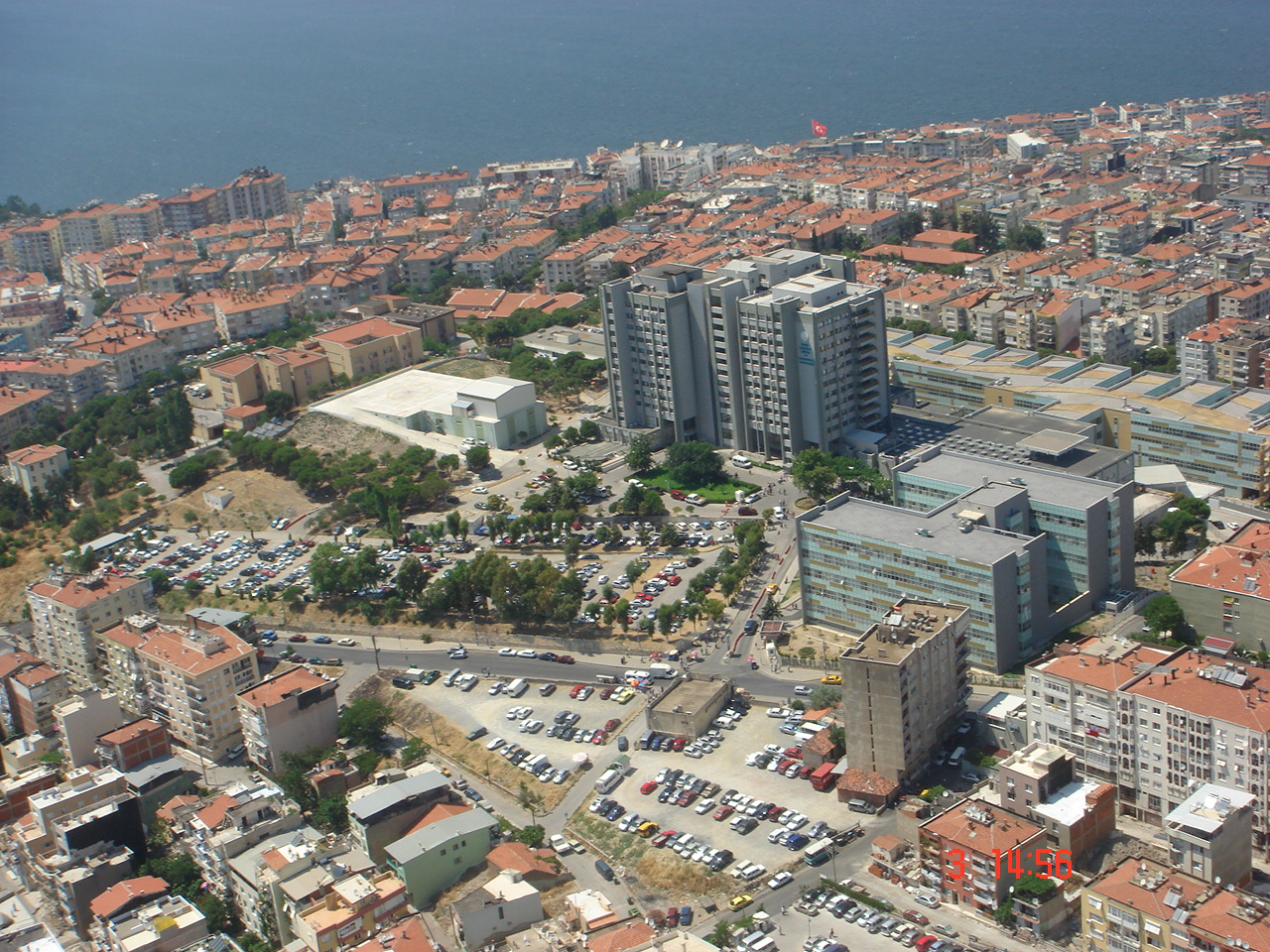
Izmir Ataturk Training and Research Hospital in Karabağlar district.

İzmir Kâtip Çelebi University (Turkish: İzmir Kâtip Çelebi Üniversitesi, also referred as IKCU) is a public university in İzmir, Turkey, established in 2010.

It is named after Kâtip Çelebi, a 17th-century Turkish polymath.

== History ==
It was established on 21 July 2010 as the 99th university of Turkey and the third state university in Izmir, under Law No. 6005 published in the Official Gazette, along with 6 other public universities. (Note: Yıldırım Beyazıt University, Bursa Technical University, Istanbul Medeniyet University, Konya University, Kayseri Abdullah Gül University, and Erzurum Technical University) Facilities of Çiğli Leaf Tobacco Industries (Çiğli Yaprak Tütün İşletmeleri), previously owned by Tekel before privatization, were assigned to the newly founded university and the main campus was established on this land.

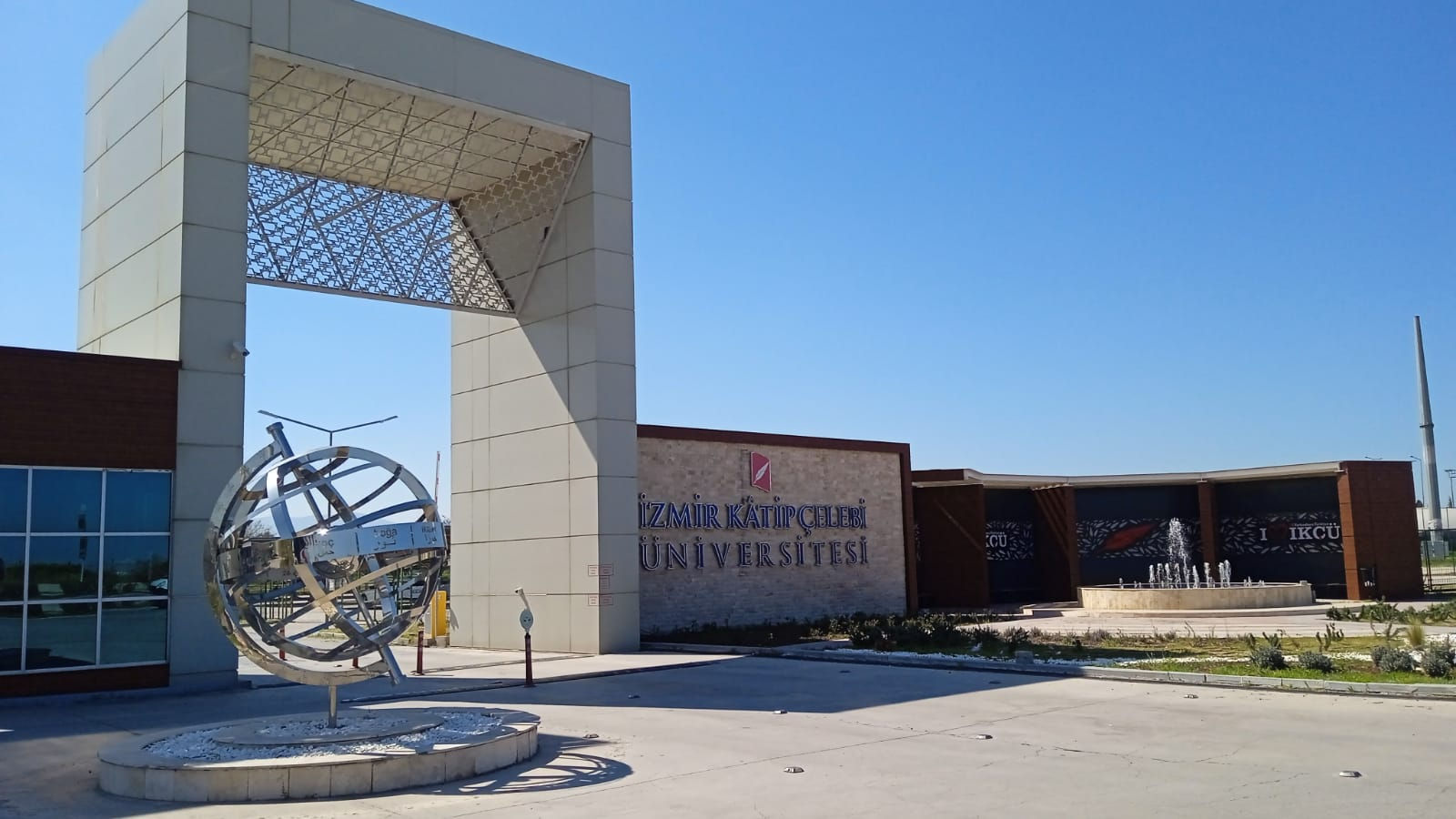
Main entrance gate of the campus.

== Campus ==
The main campus lies next to the İzmir Beltway and is served by the beltway as well as the former section of D.550 road.

== Academics ==
=== Faculties ===
- Faculty of Medicine
- Faculty of Pharmacy
- Faculty of Dentistry
- Faculty of Law
- Faculty of Economics and Administrative Sciences
  - Department of Business Administration
  - Department of Economics
  - Department of Health Institutions Management
  - Department of Political Science and Public Administration
  - Department of International Relations
  - Department of Public Finance
  - Department of International Trade and Business Administration
- Faculty of Engineering and Architecture
  - Department of Architecture
  - Department of Biomedical Engineering
  - Department of City and Regional Planning
  - Department of Civil Engineering
  - Department of Computer Engineering
  - Department of Electrical and Electronics Engineering
  - Department of Engineering Sciences
  - Department of Geomatics Engineering
  - Department of Material Science and Engineering
  - Department of Mechanical Engineering
  - Department of Mechatronics Engineering
  - Department of Petroleum and Natural Gas Engineering
- Faculty of Fisheries
- Faculty of Forestry
- Faculty of Health Sciences
- Faculty of Humanities and Social Sciences
- Faculty of Islamic Sciences
- Faculty of Naval Architecture and Maritime
- Faculty of Tourism

=== Graduate schools ===
- Graduate School of Health Sciences
- Graduate School of Natural And Applied Sciences
- Graduate School of Social Sciences

== See also ==
- List of universities in İzmir
- List of universities in Turkey
