= Erzurum Technical University =

State university in Erzurum, Turkey

- Erzurum Teknik Üniversitesi
- University logo
- Type: Public university
- Established: 21 July 2010
- Parent institution: Ministry of National Education (Turkey)
- Rector: Prof. Dr. Bülent Çakmak
- Academic staff: 472 (2024)
- Students: 7,934 (2023-24)
- Undergraduates: 5,832 (2023-24)
- Postgraduates: 1,554 (2023-24)
- Doctoral students: 548 (2023-24)
- Location: Çat Yolu Üzeri 4. Km, Yakutiye/Erzurum, Erzurum, Turkey; 39.915°N 41.276°E
- Campus: Yakutiye Campus (main)
- Colors: Navy blue, Turquoise
- Nickname: ETÜ
- Website: www.erzurum.edu.tr

Erzurum Technical University (abbreviated as ETÜ), is a public university in Erzurum, Turkey. It was established by law no. 6005 adopted by the Grand National Assembly of Turkey on 21 July 2010, along with 6 other public universities. (Note: Yıldırım Beyazıt University, Bursa Technical University, Istanbul Medeniyet University, İzmir Kâtip Çelebi University, Konya University, Kayseri Abdullah Gül University, and Erzurum Technical University) The founding rector was Prof. Dr. Muammer Yaylalı. The university started its academic activities in 2012.

As of the 2023–2024 academic year, the university has a total enrollment of 7,934 students and 472 academic staff. The current rector is Prof. Dr. Bülent Çakmak.

== Academic units ==
=== Faculties ===
- Faculty of Letters
- Faculty of Science
- Faculty of Economics and Administrative Sciences
- Faculty of Engineering and Architecture
- Faculty of Health Sciences
- Faculty of Sports Sciences

=== Institutes ===
- Institute of Science
- Institute of Social Sciences
- Institute of Health Sciences

=== Schools ===
- School of Foreign Languages

== About the Faculty of Engineering and Architecture ==
The Faculty of Engineering and Architecture began education in 2012 with the Department of Mechanical Engineering, and continues with Civil Engineering, Electrical-Electronics Engineering, Computer Engineering, Industrial Engineering, Chemical Engineering, Architecture, City and Regional Planning, and Interior Architecture. The faculty is equipped with computer laboratories, study rooms, and research laboratories for each department.

== Advanced Technology Research and Application Center ==
YÜTAM covers 4,700 m² indoor space and is one of the region's largest research centers; it includes two class-1000 cleanrooms, 22 research laboratories of various sizes, an education hall, a meeting room, personnel rooms, offices, and a lounge.

== Library ==
The university's central library operates 24/7 during the fall and spring terms, and from 08:00 to 22:00 on weekdays and 10:00 to 20:00 on Saturdays during breaks and summer. There are also study rooms in each faculty.

== Membership ==
The university is a member of the Caucasus University Association.

== Gallery ==
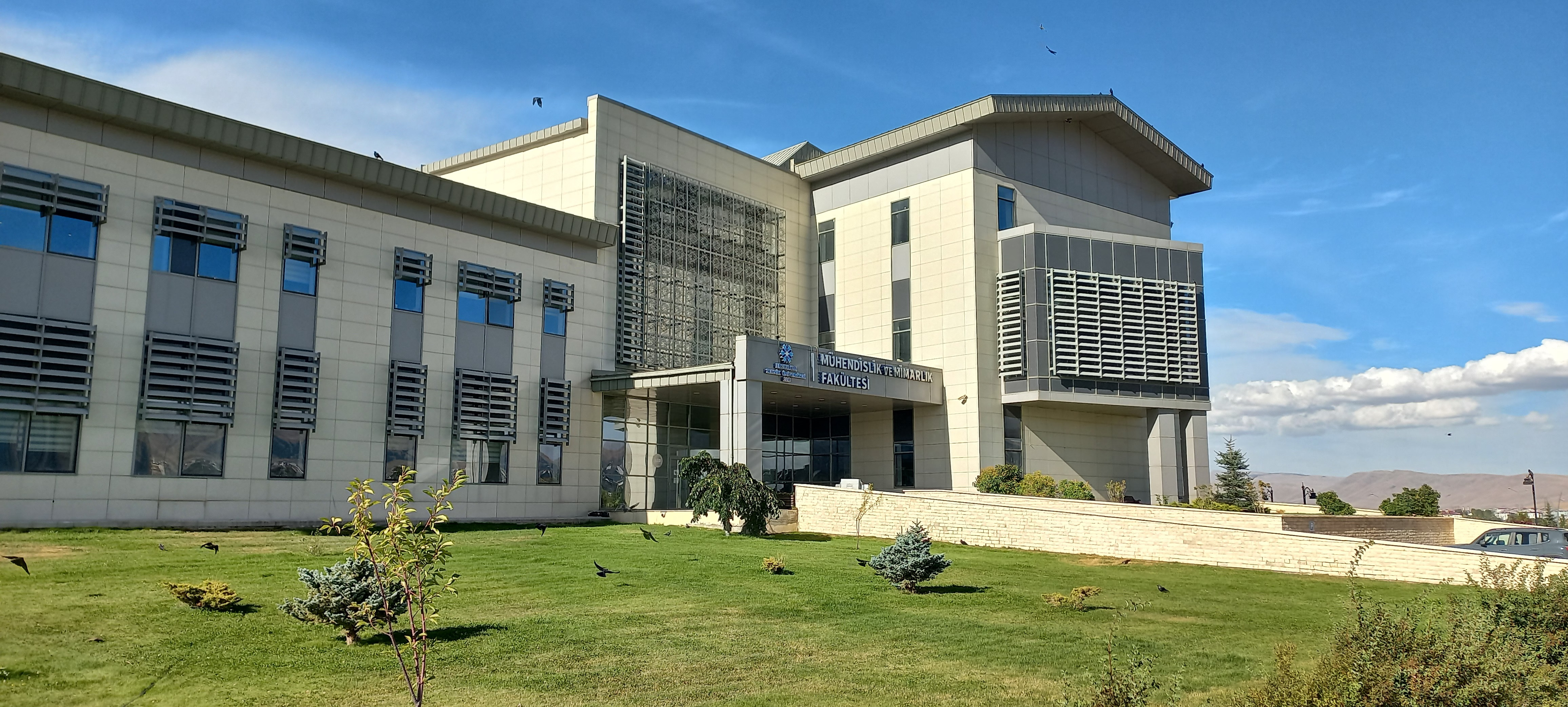
Faculty of Engineering and Architecture

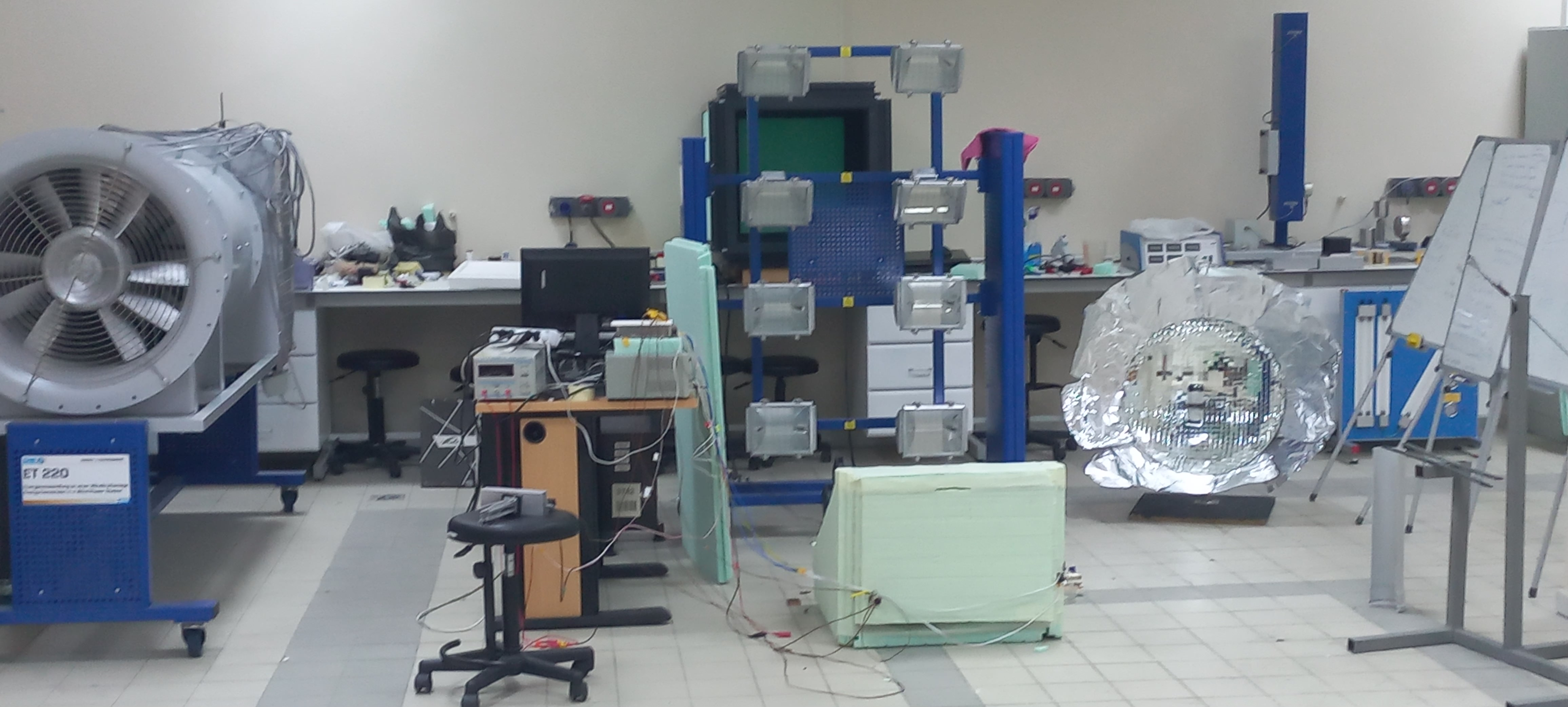
Mechanical Engineering laboratory

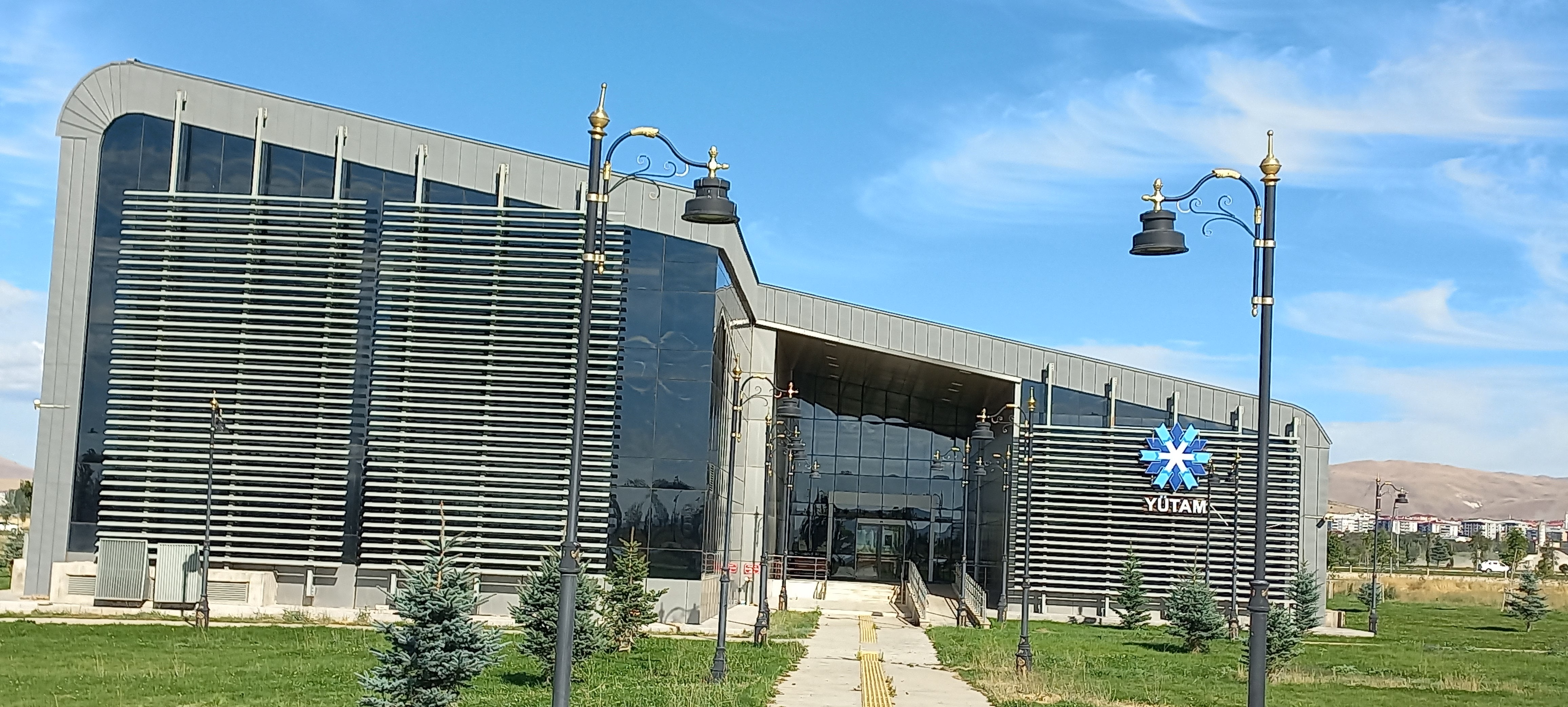
Advanced Technology Research and Application Center (YÜTAM)

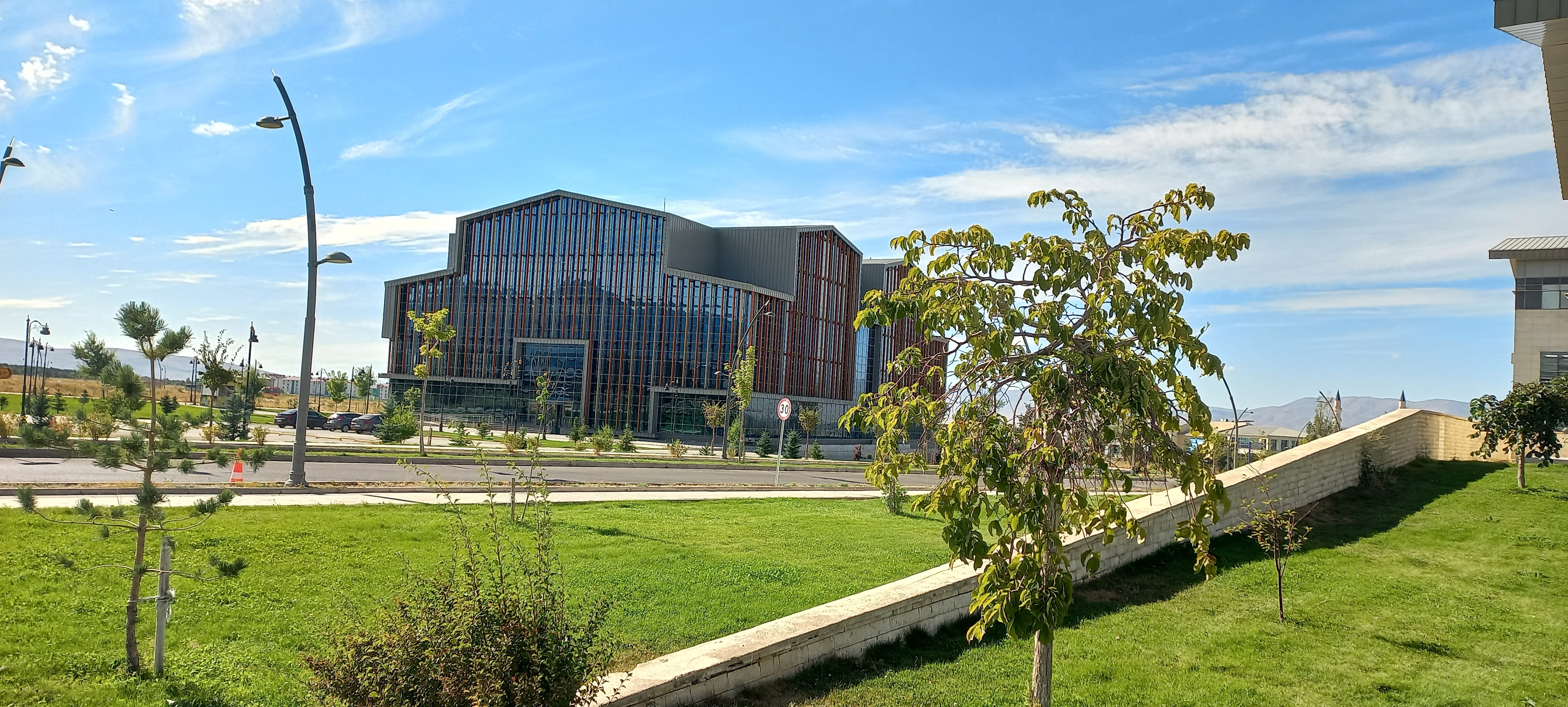
Central Library

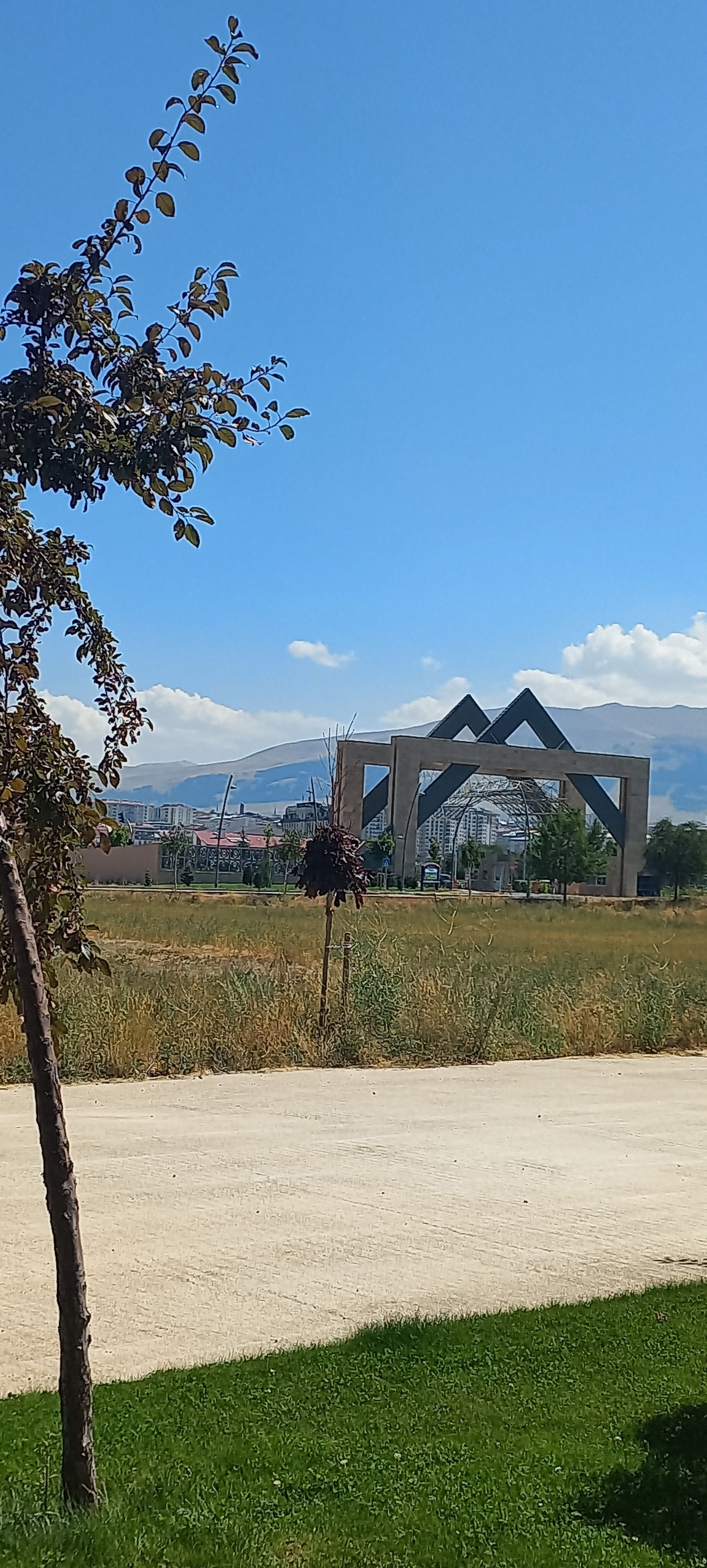
University main gate

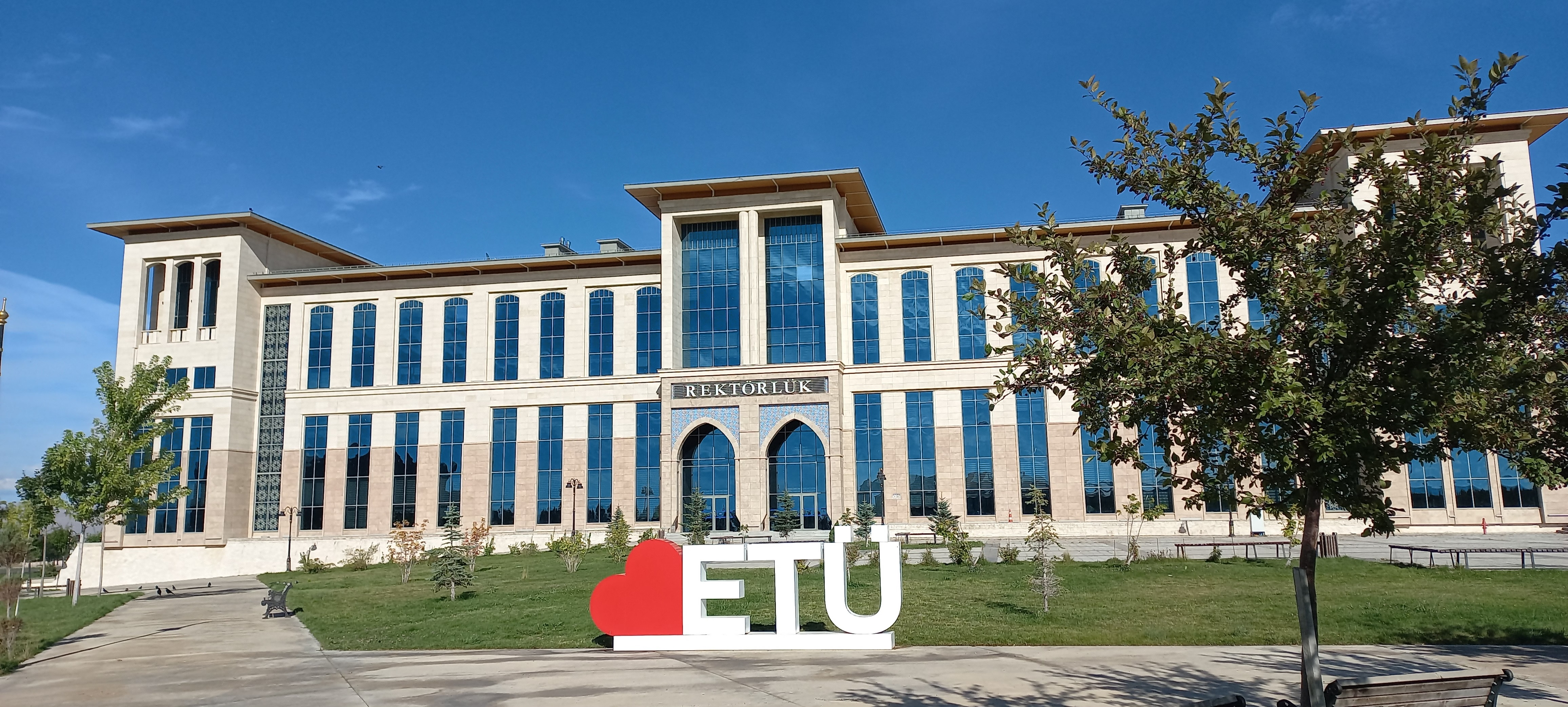
Rectorate building
