= Itk =

Itk or ITK may refer to:

- ITK (gene)
- Itk, a widget toolkit for Tcl
- Innovation TK, a company acquired by Cintel in 2002
- Insight Segmentation and Registration Toolkit, abbreviated as ITK
- Kalimantan Institute of Technology (Institut Teknologi Kalimantan), a university in Indonesia
