= IKC =

IKC may refer to:

- Imperial Klingon Cruiser, the ship prefix for Klingon starships in the Star Trek fictional universe
- Indigenous Knowledge Centre
- Izmir Kâtip Çelebi University
