= State Polytechnic of Malang =

Coordinates: 7.9462°S 112.6156°E

Malang State Polytechnic, abbreviated as "Polinema", is a state coeducational vocational education institution located in Malang City, East Java, Indonesia. Vocational education is a higher education diploma program that prepares students for work with certain applied skills. Polinema provides vocational education for the Diploma III, Diploma IV and Applied Masters Programs.

== History ==
Polinema was founded in 1982 with the name Diploma Education Program in Engineering, Non-Degree Faculty of Technology, Brawijaya University and in 2004 obtained independent status to become the Malang State Polytechnic. Polinema itself is one of the 6 pioneering polytechnics in Indonesia.

Polinema has 4 campuses, the main campus is in Malang City, (Jl. Soekarno Hatta), the second campus is in Pamekasan (Jl. Stadium IX/3 Lawangan Daya District), the third campus is in Lumajang (Jl. Lintas Timur, Sawah/Kebun Area, Jogotrunan), and the fourth campus is in Kediri (Jl. Mayor Bismo, No. 27, Semampir, Campus 2: Jl. Lingkar Maskumambang, No. 1, Sukorame).

== Study Programs ==
The Polinema offers three and four-years (Diploma Programmes and Bachelor Programmes) education in:

- International Program
- [*Mechanical engineering with a focus in mechanical systems design
- Information systems with a focus in free/open-source software based Information systems
- Civil Engineering

== Mechanical Engineering Study Program ==
The Mechanical Engineering Study Program is intended to produce middle-level experts who are competent to:

- Read and create technical/mechanical drawings according to ISO standards
- Create three-dimensional drawings of mechanical systems
- Design mechanical parts or systems
- Compute strength of mechanical system constructions
- Schedule and compute cost of prototype realization
- Use information technology in their work

== Information System Study Program ==
The Information System Study Program is intended to produce middle-level experts who are competent to:

- Develop application programs based on the LAMP software bundle.
- Administer the Linux operating system
- Design and administer Linux based computer networks
- Implement website content management systems
- Implement e-commerce concepts on small and middle size businesses
- Use office suite: word processor, spreadsheet and presentation
