= OSTIM Technical University =

Private university in Ankara, Turkey

OSTİM Technical University
- OSTİM Teknik Üniversitesi
- University logo
- Motto: The world is waiting for you
- Type: Private
- Established: July 1, 2017
- Founders: OSTİM Foundation
- Rector: Prof. Dr. Murat Yülek
- Location: OSTİM Technical University, OSTİM, 06374 Ankara, Ankara, Turkey; 39.9723°N 32.7563°E
- Campus: OSTİM Main Campus
- Language: Turkish, English
- Nickname: Ostimtech
- Website: www.ostimteknik.edu.tr

OSTİM Technical University (Turkish: OSTİM Teknik Üniversitesi) is a foundation (private non-profit) university located in Ankara, Turkey. Established in 2017 by the OSTİM Foundation, the university is notable for its strong focus on industry-oriented education and close collaboration with the OSTİM Organized Industrial Zone. The university offers programs in Turkish and English and aims to bridge the gap between academia and industry.

== Academic units ==
OSTİM Technical University consists of the following academic units:

=== Faculties ===
- Faculty of Engineering
- Faculty of Economics and Administrative Sciences
- Faculty of Architecture and Design

=== Institutes ===
- Institute of Science
- Institute of Social Sciences

=== Schools and Departments ===
- Vocational School
- Department of Foreign Languages

== Administration ==
- **Rector:** Prof. Dr. Murat Yülek (2018–present)

== Students and Academic Staff ==
As of the 2023–2024 academic year, the university has approximately 2,500 students and more than 150 academic staff members.
