= Phnom Penh Institute of Technology =

Research university in Phnom Penh, Cambodia

- វិទ្យាស្ថានបច្ចេកវិទ្យាភ្នំពេញ
- Motto: Khmer: អ្នកបង្កើតប្រវត្តិសាស្ត្រអប់រំផ្នែកវិទ្យាសាស្ត្រ និងវិស្វកម្ម
- Motto in English: Deliver the Best and Unique Education, History Maker in Science and Engineering Education
- Type: Private (National)
- Established: 2012; 14 years ago
- President: Dr. Azuma Fumimasa
- Faculty: 21
- Undergraduates: 246
- Postgraduates: 6
- Location: St. 1988, Phnom Penh, Cambodia 12101
- Campus: Urban
- Colours: Grey Blue Dark-red (DIC-641)
- Mascot: None

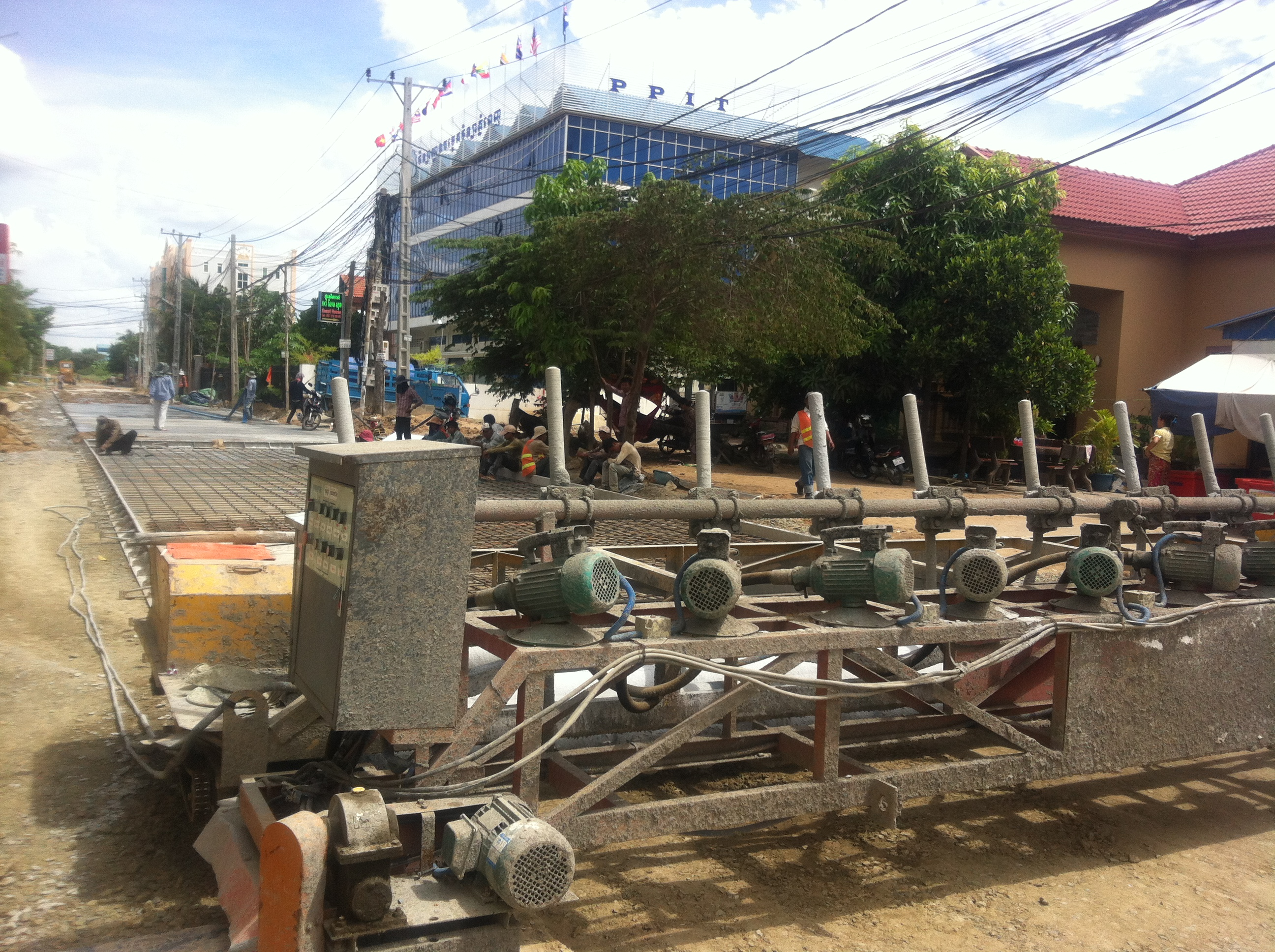
Phnom Penh Institute of Technology on St.1003, Phnom Penh

The Phnom Penh Institute of Technology (PPIT; Khmer: វិទ្យាស្ថានបច្ចេកវិទ្យាភ្នំពេញ) is a national top-tier research university in Phnom Penh, Cambodia. PPIT is the largest private institution for higher education in Cambodia dedicated to science technology and engineering. PPIT enrolled 246 undergraduates students in 2012–2013. It employs around 21 faculty members.

PPIT is organised into 4 schools, within which there are over 8 departments and research centres.

PPIT has one campus which is the Sen Sok campus in Phnom Penh Thmey Commune, Sen Sok District, Phnom Penh.

== History ==
=== Foundation and early years (2011–2013) ===
Phnom Penh Institute of Technology was founded by Japan's Graduated Cambodia Students and Yamada Osamitsu Scholarship Foundation as the Phnom Penh Vocational School on April 1, 2011, three years after the Great Recession. To accomplish the quick catch-up to the future economic recovering, the government expected this school to cultivate new modernized craftsmen and engineers. In 2013, it was renamed Phnom Penh Institute of Technology.

=== Rectangular Strategy Phase III (2013–present) ===
After forming a new government, the new education policy was promulgated in late 2013 with the Industrial Development Policy and Science Technology and Innovation Policy. Phnom Penh Institute of Technology was recognized by the Royal Government of Cambodia.

Many three-year courses were turned into four-year courses with the start of the School of Engineering this year. The university started graduate programmes in engineering in 2013.

The following year, the four centers were integrated and reorganized. The Center for the Promotion of Science Technology and Innovation; the Center for Continuing Education and Professional Development; the Center for Research Development and Industrial Liaison; the Center for Global Communication and International Language; and the School of Engineering were merged to create School of Science and Engineering.

Since January 2014, it has been privatized into the National University Incorporation of Phnom Penh Institute of Technology under a sub-decree.

== National and international partner institutions ==
=== SAKURA Exchange Program in Science (2013–present) ===
Phnom Penh Tech is a member of SAKURA Exchange Program in Science, an international network of leading universities in Japan and Asia exchanging students and senior scholars.

=== University College of Technology Sarawak (2015–present) ===
The University College of Technology Sarawak (UCTS) welcomes applications from people of at least 21 years of age who do not qualify for admission into undergraduate and postgraduate programs on the basis of formal educational attainment through Non-formal Entry via APEL.
