= Advanced Institute of Industrial Technology =

Public graduate school in Tokyo, Japan

Coordinates: 35°36′25.21″N 139°44′56.79″E

- 東京都立産業技術大学院大学
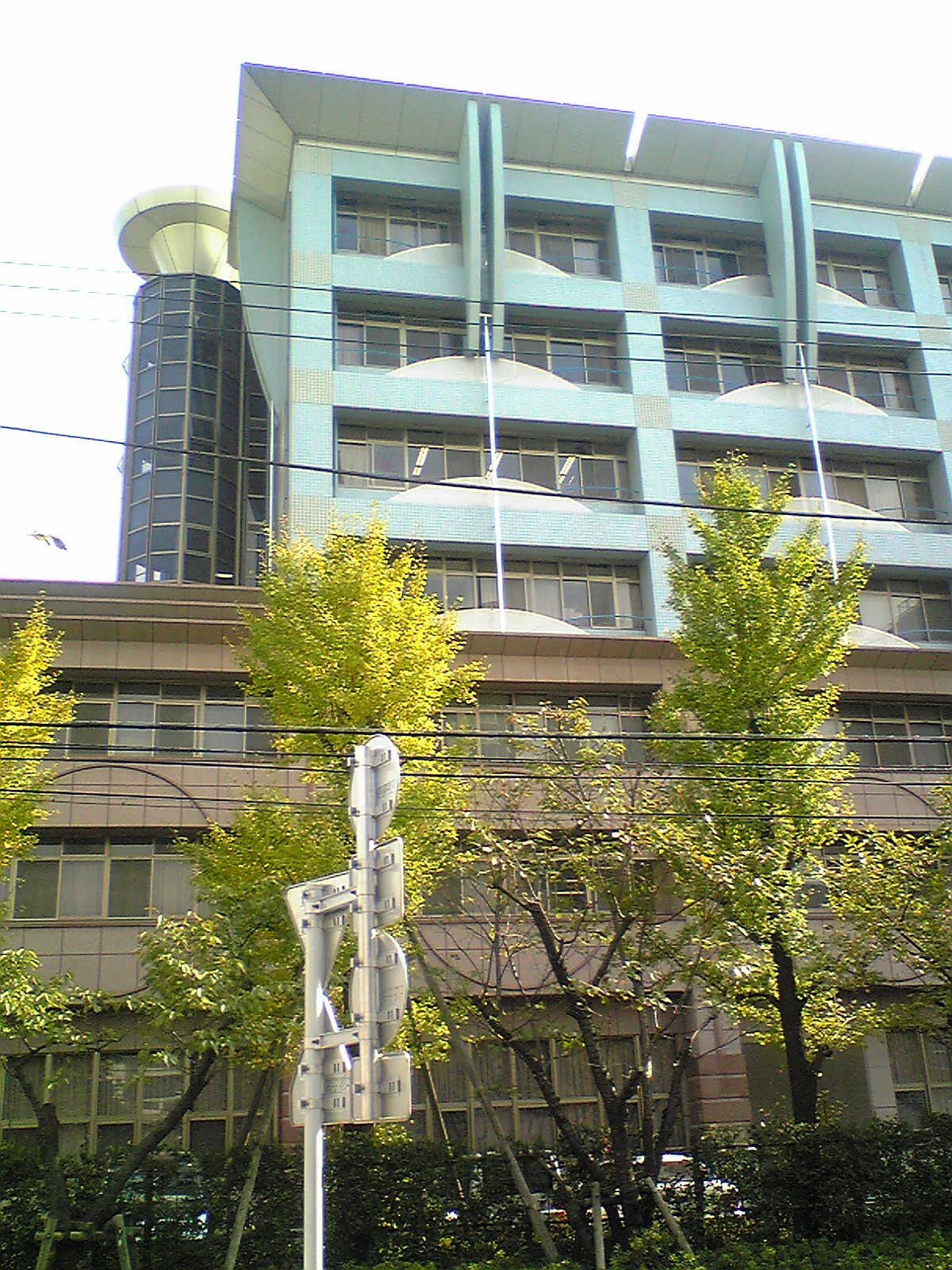
- Type: Public university
- Established: 2006
- President: Seiichi Kawata
- Faculty: 26 (May 2019)
- Students: 242 (Apr 2018)
- Postgraduates: 242
- Location: Shinagawa, Tokyo, Japan
- Campus: Urban
- Website: aiit.ac.jp

The Advanced Institute of Industrial Technology (東京都立産業技術大学院大学, Tōkyō Toritsu Sangyō Gijutsu Daigakuin Daigaku) is a public professional graduate school at Shinagawa, Tokyo, Japan, established in 2006.

The school offers professional education programs in project-based learning (PBL) method.

The school is operated by the Tokyo Metropolitan Public University Corporation, an extra-departmental body organization of the Tokyo Metropolitan Government.

== Organization ==
=== Programs ===
- Business Systems Design Engineering Course
- Innovation for Design and Engineering Course
- Information Systems Architecture Course

== Campus ==
- 1-10-40 Higashi-Ōi, Shinagawa-Ku, Tokyo 140-0011, Japan
