= Iskenderun Technical University =

State university in Hatay, Turkey

İskenderun Technical University
- İskenderun Teknik Üniversitesi
- University logo
- Motto: "You are very close to Technoversity"
- Type: Public university
- Established: 2015
- Rector: Prof. Dr. Mehmet Duruel
- Location: İskenderun Technical University, Central Campus, 31200 İskenderun/Hatay, İskenderun, Hatay, Turkey; 36.5853°N 36.1736°E
- Campus: Central Campus (İskenderun), Dörtyol, Erzin
- Language: Turkish
- Nickname: İSTE
- Website: www.iste.edu.tr

İskenderun Technical University (abbreviated as İSTE) is a public university located in İskenderun, Hatay, Turkey. It was established by Law No. 6640 on 31 March 2015. The university was founded through the transfer of several faculties and schools previously part of Mustafa Kemal University. As of 2024, the rector is Prof. Dr. Mehmet Duruel.

== Academic Units ==
=== Faculties ===
- Barbaros Hayrettin Faculty of Shipbuilding and Maritime
- Faculty of Marine Sciences and Technology
- Faculty of Aeronautics and Astronautics
- Faculty of Business and Management Sciences
- Faculty of Architecture
- Faculty of Engineering and Natural Sciences
- Faculty of Tourism

=== Vocational Schools ===
- Vocational School of Maritime Studies
- Dörtyol Vocational School
- Dörtyol Vocational School of Health Services
- Erzin Organized Industrial Zone Vocational School
- İskenderun Vocational School
- İskenderun Organized Industrial Zone Vocational School of Welding

=== Schools ===
- School of Foreign Languages

=== Conservatory ===
- Mustafa Yazıcı State Conservatory

=== Institutes ===
- Graduate School of Engineering and Natural Sciences
- Graduate School of Social Sciences
- Institute of Informatics
- Institute of Environmental and Marine Sciences
- Institute of Energy
- Institute of Iron and Steel
- Institute of Transportation and Logistics

== Campuses ==
The university has its main campus in İskenderun, with additional campuses and vocational schools in Dörtyol and Erzin. Eduroam wireless internet is available across faculties and campuses.

== Rectors ==
- Prof. Dr. Türkay Dereli (2015–2020)
- Prof. Dr. Tolga Depci (2020–2024)
- Prof. Dr. Mehmet Duruel (2024–present)
