= Kalimantan Institute of Technology =

Higher education institution in Balikpapan, Indonesia

Coordinates: 1.1503°S 116.8615°E

- Institut Teknologi Kalimantan
- Motto: SPECTA (Solid, Peduli, Cerdas, Beriman, dan Bertaqwa) (Indonesian)
- Type: Public university
- Established: October 6, 2014; 12 years ago
- Affiliations: Sepuluh Nopember Institute of Technology
- Rector: Prof. Ir. Budi Santosa Purwokartiko, Ph.D.
- Location: Jalan Soekarno-Hatta km. 15, Karang Joang, North Balikpapan, Balikpapan, East Kalimantan, Indonesia
- Campus: Suburban, 740 acres (300 ha)
- Colors: Dark blue
- Website: www.itk.ac.id

Kalimantan Institute of Technology (Indonesian: Institut Teknologi Kalimantan, abbreviated as ITK) is a technological-focused public university based in Balikpapan, East Kalimantan, Indonesia.

== History ==
ITK was created in 2012 as part of the Master Plan for Acceleration and Expansion on Indonesia's Economic Development (MP3EI). At the time, East Kalimantan had one university, Mulawarman University. ITK started collaborating with Sepuluh Nopember Institute of Technology. with the latter also providing ITK’s first campuses. Despite that, ITK had already started accepting students in 2012, with 100 students from East Kalimantan exclusively as its first-year batch.

Originally, only five majors were available to the students: electrical engineering, mechanical engineering, naval engineering, chemical engineering, and civil engineering. By 2013, the number of majors available increased, and ITK started accepting students from outside East Kalimantan.

In 2014, ITK officially became a public university, and, by 2015, ITK started operating from its Balikpapan campus.

== Logo ==
The logo of the university consists of two aspects, each with their own meaning:

1. Two hornbills refers to balance and consistency in creating a generation of achieving students that can contribute to society.
2. Two hands holding an opened book refers to the importance of scientific knowledge.

== Academics ==
ITK has a total of 21 programs across five faculties and all of them are at the undergraduate level: mathematics and information technology; science, food, and maritime technology; industrial technology and processes; civil engineering and planning; earth science and environment.

According to the Webometrics 2021 report, ITK is ranked at 292 amongst all university in Indonesia.
