= Necmettin Erbakan University =

Public university in Konya, Turkey

- Necmettin Erbakan Üniversitesi
- Type: Public
- Established: 2010
- Location: Konya, Turkey
- Website: erbakan.edu.tr

Necmettin Erbakan University (Turkish Necmettin Erbakan Üniversitesi) is a public university in Konya, Turkey.

== History ==
Necmettin Erbakan University (NEU) was established as Konya University. On April 11, 2012, its name was changed to "Necmettin Erbakan University" in memory of former Prime Minister Necmettin Erbakan.

NEU is one of the three public universities in Konya.

== Academic units ==
As of 2021, the university has 20 faculties, 1 college, 4 institutes and 8 vocational schools and 1 music school.

=== Faculties ===
- Ahmet Keleşoğlu Faculty of Education
- Ahmet Keleşoğlu Faculty of Theology
- Faculty of Dentistry
- Ereğli Faculty of Education
- Ereğli Faculty of Agriculture
- Faculty of Science
- Faculty of Fine Arts
- Faculty of Aeronautics and Astronautics
- Faculty of Nursing
- Faculty of Law
- Meram Faculty of Medicine
- Faculty of Engineering and Architecture
- Faculty of Health Sciences
- Seydişehir Ahmet Cengiz Faculty of Engineering
- Seydişehir Faculty of Health Sciences
- Faculty of Political Sciences
- Faculty of Social Sciences and Humanities
- Faculty of Tourism
- Faculty of Applied Sciences
- Faculty of Veterinary Medicine

=== Institutes ===
- Institute of Education Sciences
- Institute of Science
- Institute of Health Sciences
- Institute of Social Sciences

=== College ===
- Foreign languages

=== Music school ===
- Conservatory

=== Vocational School ===
- Justice Vocational School
- Ereğli Vocational School of Justice
- Ereğli Health Services Vocational School
- Konya Ereğli Kemal Akman Vocational School
- Meram Vocational School
- Health Services Vocational School
- Seydişehir Vocational School
- Seydişehir Health Services Vocational School

== See also ==
- List of universities in Turkey
