= Ankara Yıldırım Beyazıt University =

Public university in Ankara, Turkey

Ankara Yildirim Beyazit University
- Ankara Yıldırım Beyazıt Üniversitesi
- Motto: Knowledge, Will, Courage and Speed
- Type: Public
- Established: 21 July 2010
- Rector: Ali Cengiz Köseoğlu
- Academic staff: 1,380 (2022)
- Students: 24,166 (2021-22)
- Undergraduates: 16,638 (2021-22)
- Postgraduates: 3,247 (2021-22)
- Doctoral students: 1,261 (2021-22)
- Location: Ankara, Turkey
- Campus: Multiple campuses (Esenboga main campus and others), 231,395 m² (indoor)
- Language: Turkish, English
- Colors: Navy blue, Turquoise
- Website: aybu.edu.tr/aybu/en

Ankara Yildirim Beyazit University (AYBU; Turkish: Ankara Yıldırım Beyazıt Üniversitesi) is a public university located in Ankara, Turkey. Established in 2010 as the fifth public university in the city, AYBU offers instruction in both Turkish and English and hosts a diverse student body, including a high proportion of international students.

The university is named after Bayezid the Thunderbolt (Yıldırım Beyazıt), 15th-century Ottoman sultan.

University rankings

Regional – Overall
- QS Emerging Europe and Central Asia: 351-400 (2022)

== History ==
The university was founded with a decree published in the Official Gazette on 21 July 2010.

AYBU began accepting students in the 2011–2012 academic year, initially in the faculties of Medicine, Law, Political Science, Engineering and Natural Sciences, and Health Sciences (Nursing). Additional faculties such as Dentistry and Aerospace Sciences were added in subsequent years. The university is recognized for having one of the highest rates of international students among Turkish universities and for its many programs offered in English.

== Academic structure ==
As of 2024, the university comprises:

- **Faculties** (16): Medicine, Dentistry, Law, Political Science, Humanities and Social Sciences, Islamic Sciences, Business, Engineering and Natural Sciences, Health Sciences, Fine Arts, Architecture, Communication, Aerospace Sciences, Pharmacy, Applied Sciences (Sereflikochisar), and Turkish Music State Conservatory.
- **Institutes**: Graduate Schools of Natural Sciences, Health Sciences, Social Sciences, International Relations and Strategic Studies, and Public Health.
- **Vocational schools**: School of Foreign Languages, Vocational School of Health Services.

== Campuses ==
AYBU operates several campuses across Ankara:

- **Esenboga Main Campus** (Çubuk/Ankara)
- Etlik East and West Campuses (Keçiören/Ankara)
- Cinnah Campus (Çankaya/Ankara)
- Bilkent Campus (Çankaya/Ankara)
- Çubuk Campus (Çubuk/Ankara)
- Ulus (Altındağ/Ankara, for administration)

== Medical education ==
The Faculty of Medicine is based in Bilkent (Çankaya) and conducts programs in both Turkish and English, open to domestic and international students. Practical training takes place at Ankara Bilkent City Hospital, Turkey's largest hospital complex, with more than 3,500 beds .

International applicants are accepted via the Foreign Students Examination (YÖS), SAT, or other recognized examinations. Tuition fees apply only to foreign students.

== Library ==
The university library contains nearly 1 million printed and electronic resources, and provides access to numerous national and international databases .

== Affiliations ==
AYBU is a member of the Caucasus University Association.

== Notable collaborations ==
AYBU has signed international cooperation agreements with over 100 universities worldwide, including the University of Florida, University of Texas at San Antonio, University of Stirling, Hanyang University, and Maxim Gorky Institute.

Domestically, the university cooperates with TUSAŞ (Turkish Aerospace Industries) and HAVELSAN for student internships and practice. Agreements with the Justice Academy of Turkey enable law graduates to receive advanced legal education.
