= Bursa Technical University =

Public university in Bursa, Turkey

- Bursa Teknik Üniversitesi
- Logo of Bursa Technical University
- Motto: Innovative State University
- Type: Public university
- Established: July 21, 2010 (15 years ago)
- Rector: Prof. Dr. Naci Çağlar
- Academic staff: 471
- Students: 8,739
- Undergraduates: 6,915
- Postgraduates: 1,824
- Location: Bursa, Turkey; 40.25191°N 29.09354°E
- Language: Turkish, English
- Colours: Navy blue, Turquoise
- Website: www.btu.edu.tr

Bursa Technical University (Turkish: Bursa Teknik Üniversitesi) is a public university located in Bursa, Turkey. It was founded in 2010, becoming the fifth technical university in Turkey and the second public university in Bursa. The university was established by Law No. 6005, published in the Official Gazette on 21 July 2010.

BTU offers undergraduate and graduate programs in various disciplines. As of 2022, the university has 8,739 students and 471 academic staff members. The language of instruction is Turkish and partially English.

== History ==
The university admitted its first students in the 2011–2012 academic year. Prof. Dr. Ali Sürmen served as the founding rector. As of 2022, the rector is Prof. Dr. Naci Çağlar.

== Academic units ==
=== Faculties ===
- Faculty of Engineering and Natural Sciences
- Faculty of Humanities and Social Sciences
- Faculty of Maritime Sciences
- Faculty of Forestry
- Faculty of Communication
- Faculty of Architecture and Design

=== Institutes ===
- Graduate School of Education

=== Schools ===
- School of Foreign Languages

=== Research centers ===
BTU hosts various research and application centers, including centers for robotics and smart systems, electric vehicles, central research laboratories, and earthquake engineering.

== Campuses ==
The university operates on two main campuses: Mimar Sinan and Yıldırım Bayezid. Both campuses are located near the city center and are accessible by public transport.

== Student life ==
BTU offers a range of student clubs in sports, culture, arts, and science. Facilities include cafeterias, sports halls, and social spaces.

== Academic journals ==
- Academic Review of Humanities and Social Sciences
- Journal of Innovative Science and Engineering
- Ağaç ve Orman

== Technopark and Technology Transfer Office ==
The Bursa Technical University Technopark (Bursateknopark) and Technology Transfer Office (Bursatto) operate within the university.

== Former Bursa Orhangazi University students ==
After the closure of Bursa Orhangazi University in 2016, its students were transferred to Bursa Technical University.
