= List of universities in Turkey =

This is a list of universities in Turkey. There are 208 universities and academies in total: 129 public universities (eleven technical universities, one institutes of technology, and two fine arts university, one national defense university, and one police academy) and 75 private foundation universities.

== Listing by location ==
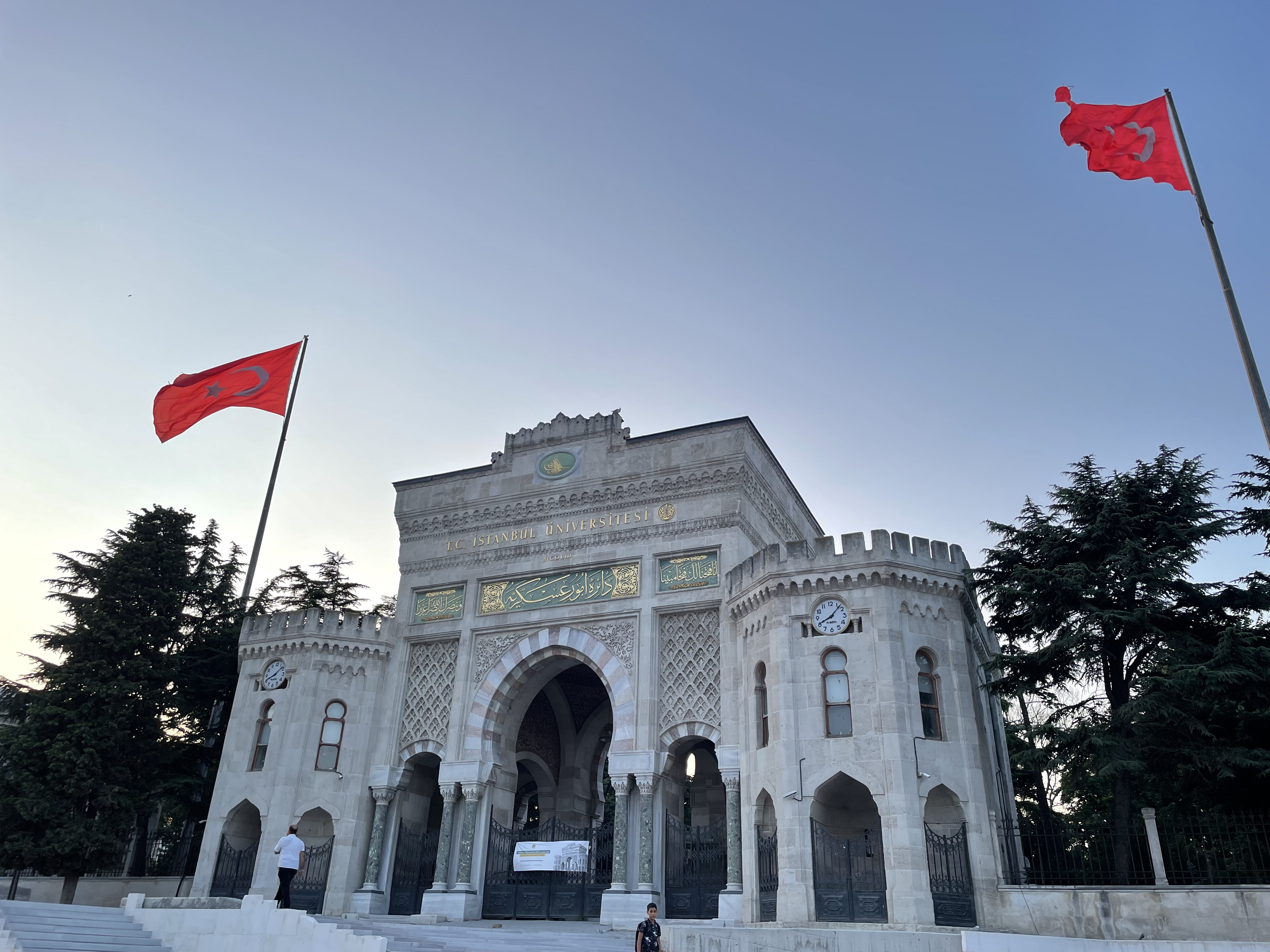
Entrance Gate of Istanbul University, a university founded in 1453 and the oldest university in Turkey

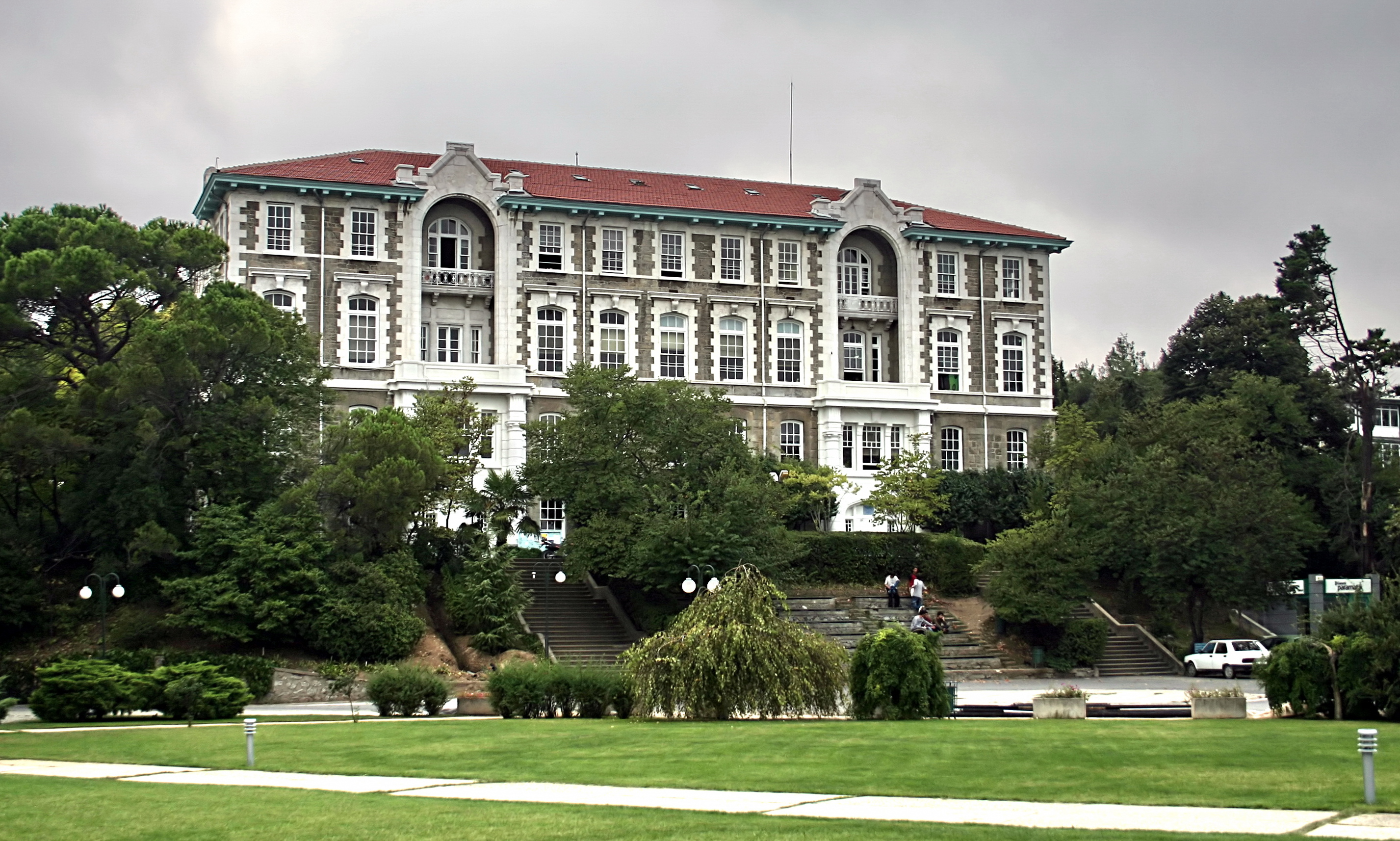
Faculty of Arts and Sciences, Boğaziçi University, founded as Robert College in 1863, Istanbul

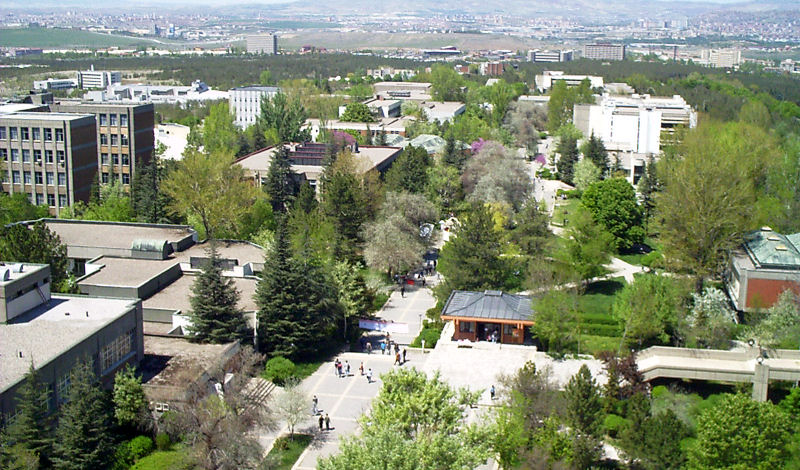
Middle East Technical University in Ankara, established in 1956, is the first public university in Turkey to offer instruction in English.

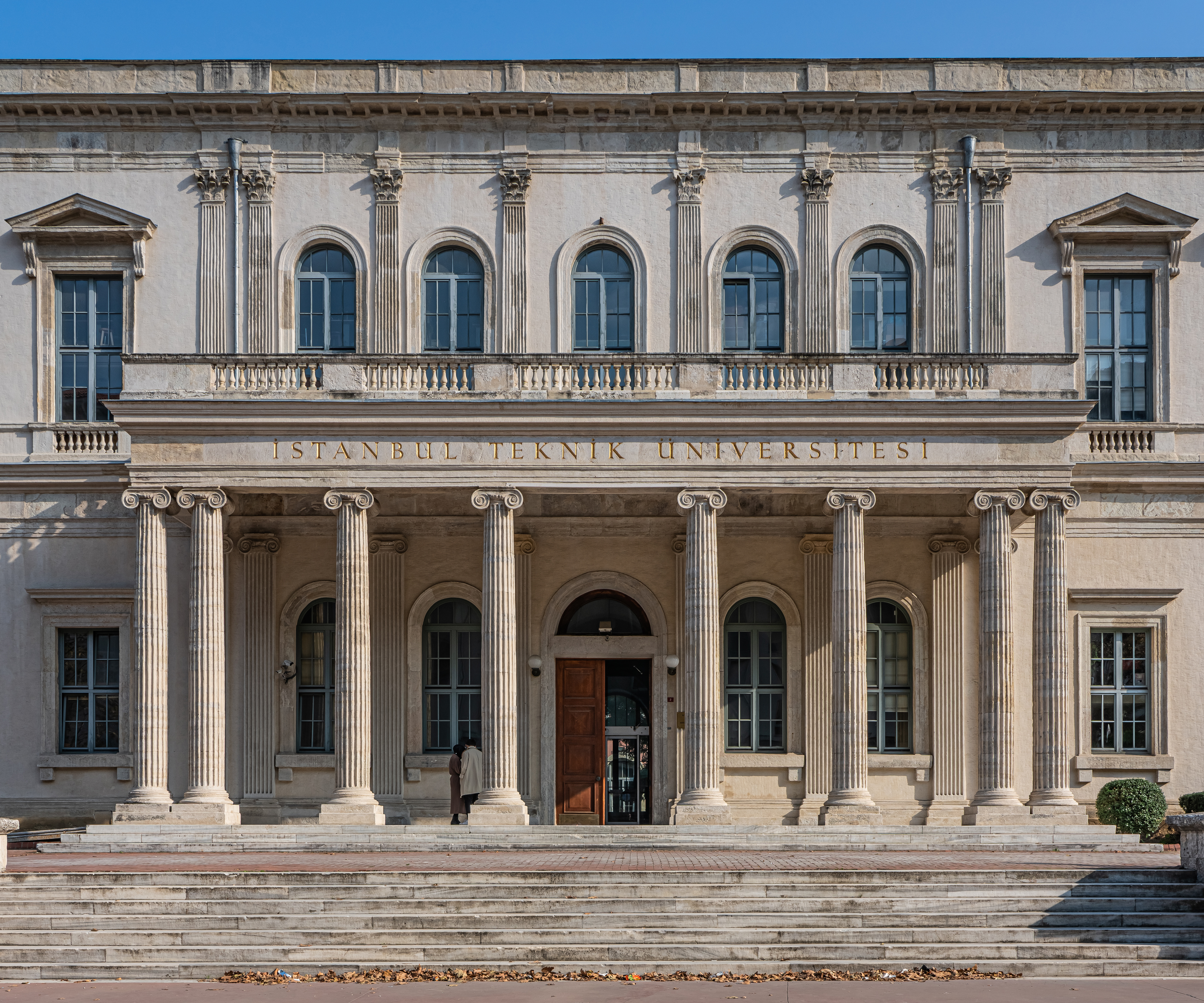
Istanbul Technical University, founded in 1773, Faculty of Architecture located in Taksim

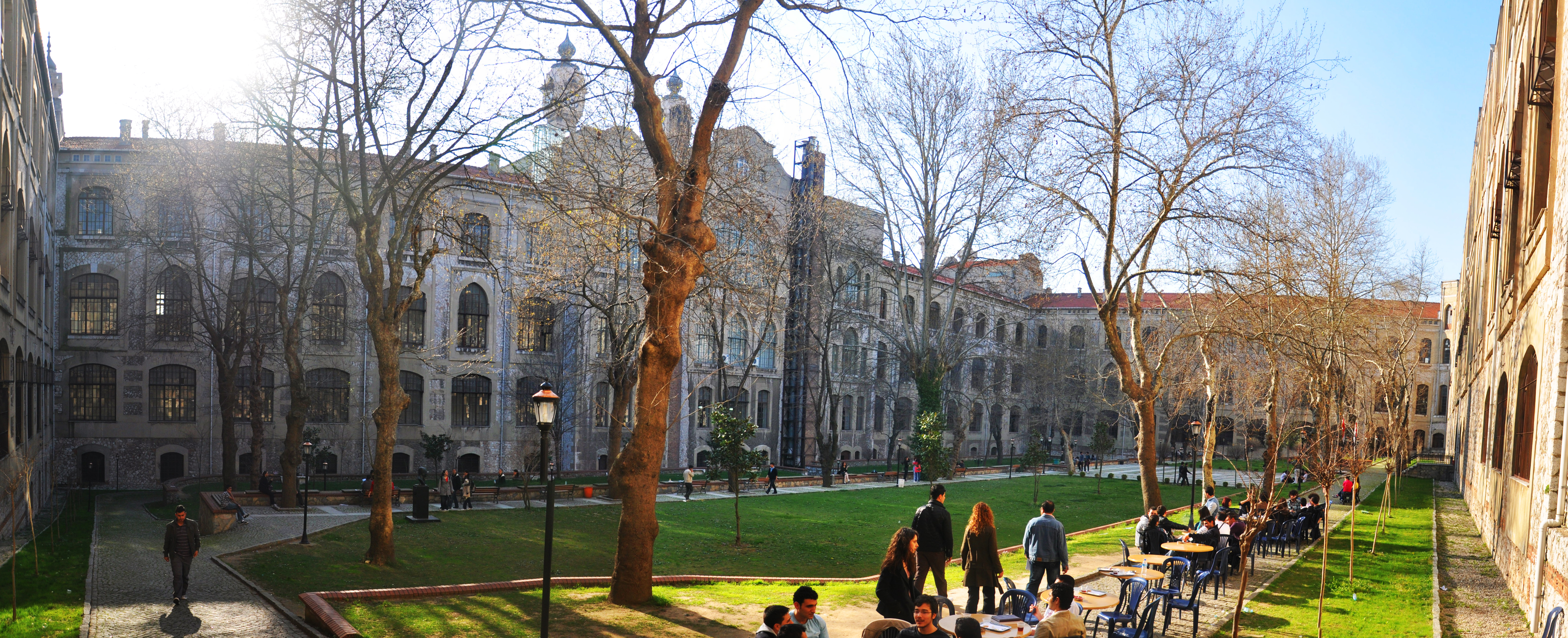
Marmara University, established in 1883 in Istanbul

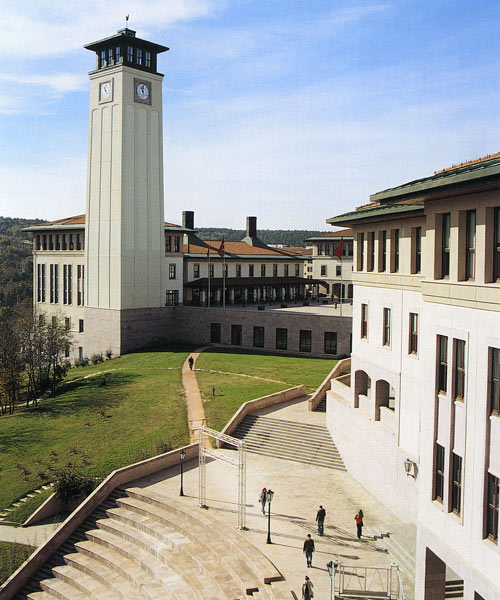
Koç University

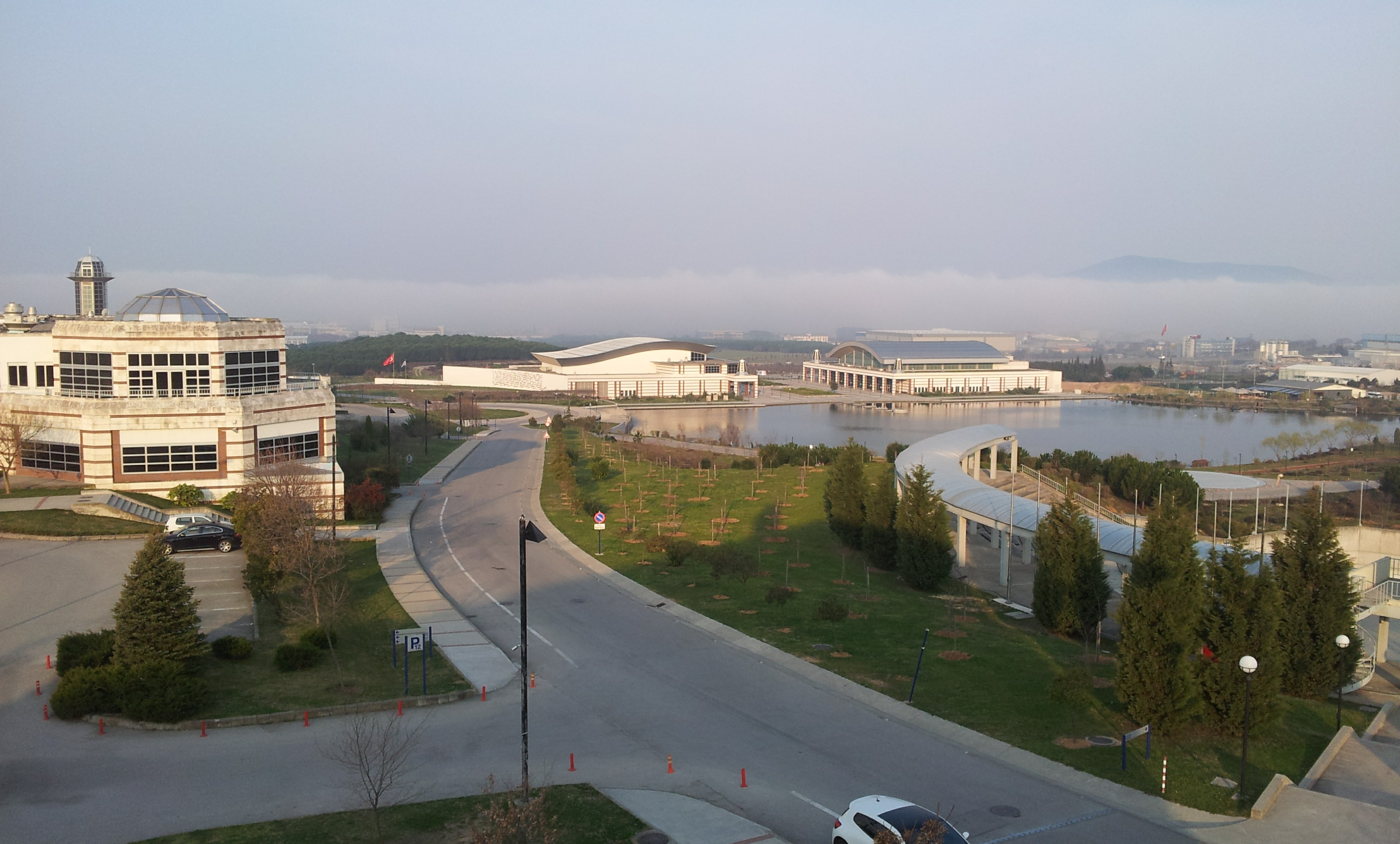
Sabancı University

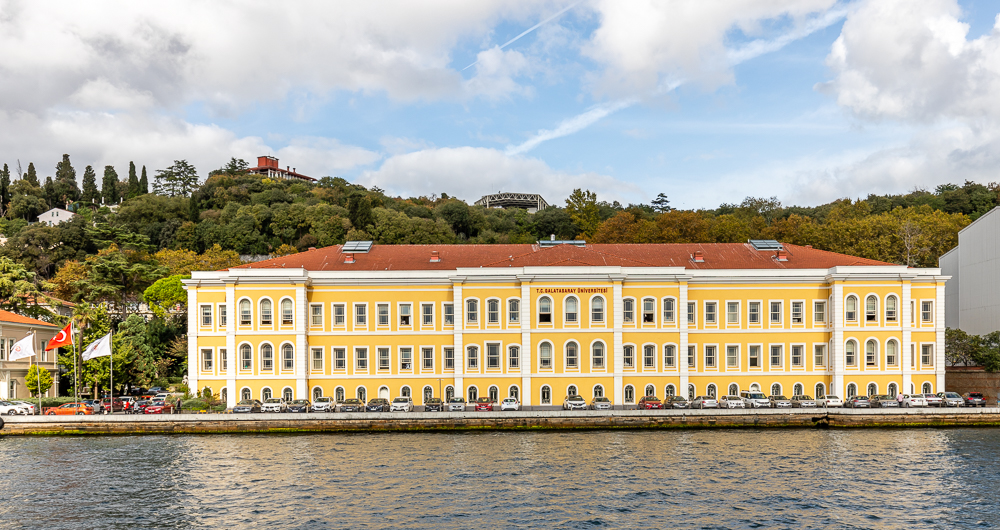
Galatasaray University

Location	University	Type	Founded
Adana	Adana Alparslan Türkeş University of Science and Technology	Public	2011
Adana	Çukurova University	Public	1973
Adıyaman	Adıyaman University	Public	2006
Afyonkarahisar	Afyon Kocatepe University	Public	1992
Afyonkarahisar	Afyonkarahisar Health Sciences University	Public	2018
Ağrı	Ağrı İbrahim Çeçen University	Public	2007
Aksaray	Aksaray University	Public	2006
Amasya	Amasya University	Public	2006
Ankara	Ankara University	Public	1946
Ankara	Ankara Music and Fine Arts University	Public	2017
Ankara	Ankara Hacı Bayram Veli University	Public	2018
Ankara	Social Sciences University of Ankara	Public	2013
Ankara	Gazi University	Public	1926
Ankara	Hacettepe University	Public	1967
Ankara	Middle East Technical University	Public	1956
Ankara	Ankara Yıldırım Beyazıt University	Public	2010
Ankara	Ankara Science University	Private	2020
Ankara	Ankara Medipol University	Private	2018
Ankara	Atılım University	Private	1997
Ankara	Başkent University	Private	1994
Ankara	Çankaya University	Private	1997
Ankara	Bilkent University	Private	1985
Ankara	Lokman Hekim University	Private	2018
Ankara	OSTIM Technical University	Private	2017
Ankara	TED University	Private	2009
Ankara	TOBB University of Economics and Technology	Private	2003
Ankara	Ufuk University	Private	1999
Ankara	University of Turkish Aeronautical Association	Private	2011
Ankara	Yüksek İhtisas University	Private	2013
Ankara	Police Academy (Police)	Special	1937
Antalya	Akdeniz University	Public	1982
Antalya	Alanya Alaaddin Keykubat University	Public	2015
Antalya	Alanya University	Private	2011
Antalya	Antalya Belek University	Private	2015
Antalya	Antalya Science University	Private	2010
Ardahan	Ardahan University	Public	2008
Artvin	Artvin Çoruh University	Public	2007
Aydın	Aydın Adnan Menderes University	Public	1992
Balıkesir	Balıkesir University	Public	1992
Balıkesir	Bandırma Onyedi Eylül University	Public	2015
Bartın	Bartın University	Public	2008
Batman	Batman University	Public	2007
Bayburt	Bayburt University	Public	2008
Bilecik	Bilecik Şeyh Edebali University	Public	2007
Bingöl	Bingöl University	Public	2007
Bitlis	Bitlis Eren University	Public	2007
Bolu	Bolu Abant İzzet Baysal University	Public	1992
Burdur	Burdur Mehmet Akif Ersoy University	Public	2006
Bursa	Bursa Technical University	Public	2010
Bursa	Bursa Uludağ University	Public	1975
Bursa	Mudanya University	Private	2022
Çanakkale	Çanakkale Onsekiz Mart University	Public	1992
Çankırı	Çankırı Karatekin University	Public	2007
Çorum	Hitit University	Public	2006
Denizli	Pamukkale University	Public	1992
Diyarbakır	Dicle University	Public	1973
Düzce	Düzce University	Public	2006
Edirne	Trakya University	Public	1982
Elazığ	Fırat University	Public	1975
Erzincan	Erzincan Binali Yıldırım University	Public	2006
Erzurum	Atatürk University	Public	1957
Erzurum	Erzurum Technical University	Public	2010
Eskişehir	Anadolu University	Public	1958
Eskişehir	Eskişehir Osmangazi University	Public	1993
Eskişehir	Eskişehir Technical University	Public	2018
Gaziantep	Gaziantep University	Public	1987
Gaziantep	Gaziantep Islam Science and Technology University	Public	2018
Gaziantep	Hasan Kalyoncu University	Private	2008
Gaziantep	Sanko University	Private	2013
Giresun	Giresun University	Public	2006
Gümüşhane	Gümüşhane University	Public	2008
Hakkâri	Hakkari University	Public	2008
Hatay	Iskenderun Technical University	Public	2015
Hatay	Hatay Mustafa Kemal University	Public	1992
Iğdır	Iğdır University	Public	2008
Isparta	Süleyman Demirel University	Public	1992
Isparta	Isparta University of Applied Sciences	Public	2018
Ankara (Military)	Military Academy	Military	1848
İstanbul (Military)	Air Force Academy	Military	1951
Istanbul (Military)	Naval Academy	Military	1773
Istanbul	Boğaziçi University	Public	1863
Istanbul	Galatasaray University	Public	1994
Istanbul	Istanbul Medeniyet University	Public	2010
Istanbul	Istanbul Technical University	Public	1773
Istanbul	Istanbul University	Public	1453
Istanbul	Istanbul University-Cerrahpaşa	Public	2018
Istanbul	Marmara University	Public	1883
Istanbul	Mimar Sinan Fine Arts University	Public	1882
Istanbul	Turkish-German University	Public	2010
Istanbul	Turkish-Japanese Science and Technology University	Public	2017
Istanbul	University of Health Sciences	Public	2015
Istanbul	Yıldız Technical University	Public	1911
Istanbul	Acıbadem University	Private	2007
Istanbul	Altınbaş University	Private	2008
Istanbul	Bahçeşehir University	Private	1998
Istanbul	Beykoz University	Private	2016
Istanbul	Bezmialem Vakıf University	Private	2010
Istanbul	Biruni University	Private	2014
Istanbul	Demiroğlu Bilim University	Private	2006
Istanbul	Doğuş University	Private	1997
Istanbul	Fatih Sultan Mehmet Vakıf University	Private	2010
Istanbul	Fenerbahçe University	Private	2016
Istanbul	Haliç University	Private	1998
Istanbul	Ibn Haldun University	Private	2015
Istanbul	Istanbul 29 Mayıs University	Private	2010
Istanbul	Istanbul Arel University	Private	2007
Istanbul	Istanbul Atlas University	Private	2018
Istanbul	Istanbul Aydın University	Private	2007
Istanbul	Istanbul Beykent University	Private	1997
Istanbul	Istanbul Bilgi University	Private	1996
Istanbul	Istanbul Commerce University	Private	2001
Istanbul	Istanbul Esenyurt University	Private	2013
Istanbul	Istanbul Galata University	Private	2019
Istanbul	Istanbul Gedik University	Private	2010
Istanbul	Istanbul Gelişim University	Private	2011
Istanbul	Istanbul Health and Technology University	Private	2018
Istanbul	Istanbul Kent University	Private	2016
Istanbul	Istanbul Kültür University	Private	1997
Istanbul	Istanbul Medipol University	Private	2009
Istanbul	Istanbul Nişantaşı University	Private	2009
Istanbul	Istanbul Okan University	Private	1999
Istanbul	Istanbul Rumeli University	Private	2015
Istanbul	Istanbul Sabahattin Zaim University	Private	2010
Istanbul	Istanbul Topkapı University	Private	2009
Istanbul	Istanbul Yeni Yüzyıl University	Private	2009
Istanbul	Işık University	Private	1996
Istanbul	İstinye University	Private	2015
Istanbul	Kadir Has University	Private	1997
Istanbul	Koç University	Private	1992
Istanbul	Maltepe University	Private	1997
Istanbul	MEF University	Private	2012
Istanbul	Özyeğin University	Private	2007
Istanbul	Piri Reis University	Private	2008
Istanbul	Sabancı University	Private	1996
Istanbul	Üsküdar University	Private	2011
Istanbul	Yeditepe University	Private	1996
İzmir	Dokuz Eylül University	Public	1982
İzmir	Ege University	Public	1955
İzmir	İzmir Institute of Technology	Public	1992
İzmir	Yaşar University	Private	2001
İzmir	İzmir Kâtip Çelebi University	Public	2010
İzmir	İzmir Bakırçay University	Public	2016
İzmir	İzmir Democracy University	Public	2016
İzmir	İzmir University of Economics	Private	2001
İzmir	İzmir Tınaztepe University	Private	2018
Kahramanmaraş	Kahramanmaraş İstiklal University	Public	2018
Kahramanmaraş	Kahramanmaraş Sütçü İmam University	Public	1992
Karabük	Karabük University	Public	2007
Karaman	Karamanoğlu Mehmetbey University	Public	2007
Kars	Kafkas University	Public	1992
Kastamonu	Kastamonu University	Public	2006
Kayseri	Abdullah Gül University	Public	2010
Kayseri	Erciyes University	Public	1978
Kayseri	Kayseri University	Public	2018
Kayseri	Nuh Naci Yazgan University	Private	2009
Kırıkkale	Kırıkkale University	Public	1992
Kırklareli	Kırklareli University	Public	2007
Kırşehir	Kırşehir Ahi Evran University	Public	2006
Kilis	Kilis 7 Aralık University	Public	2007
Kocaeli	Gebze Technical University	Public	2014
Kocaeli	Kocaeli University	Public	1992
Kocaeli	Kocaeli Health and Technology University	Private	2020
Konya	Konya Technical University	Public	2018
Konya	Necmettin Erbakan University	Public	2010
Konya	Selçuk University	Public	1975
Konya	Konya Food and Agriculture University	Private	2013
Konya	KTO Karatay University	Private	2009
Kütahya	Kütahya Dumlupınar University	Public	1992
Kütahya	Kütahya Health Sciences University	Public	2018
Malatya	İnönü University	Public	1975
Malatya	Malatya Turgut Özal University	Public	2018
Manisa	Manisa Celal Bayar University	Public	1992
Mardin	Mardin Artuklu University	Public	2007
Mersin	Mersin University	Public	1992
Mersin	Çağ University	Private	1997
Mersin	Tarsus University	Public	2018
Mersin	Toros University	Private	2009
Muğla	Muğla Sıtkı Koçman University	Public	1992
Muş	Muş Alparslan University	Public	2007
Nevşehir	Nevşehir Hacı Bektaş Veli University	Public	2007
Nevşehir	Cappadocia University	Private	2017
Niğde	Niğde Ömer Halisdemir University	Public	1992
Ordu	Ordu University	Public	2006
Osmaniye	Osmaniye Korkut Ata University	Public	2007
Rize	Recep Tayyip Erdoğan University	Public	2006
Sakarya	Sakarya University	Public	1992
Sakarya	Sakarya University of Applied Sciences	Public	2018
Samsun	Ondokuz Mayıs University	Public	1975
Samsun	Samsun University	Public	2018
Siirt	Siirt University	Public	2007
Sinop	Sinop University	Public	2007
Sivas	Sivas Cumhuriyet University	Public	1974
Sivas	Sivas University of Science and Technology	Public	2018
Şanlıurfa	Harran University	Public	1992
Şırnak	Şırnak University	Public	2008
Tekirdağ	Tekirdağ Namık Kemal University	Public	2006
Tokat	Tokat Gaziosmanpaşa University	Public	1992
Trabzon	Karadeniz Technical University	Public	1955
Trabzon	Trabzon University	Public	2018
Trabzon	Avrasya University	Private	2010
Tunceli	Munzur University	Public	2008
Uşak	Uşak University	Public	2006
Van	Van Yüzüncü Yıl University	Public	1982
Yalova	Yalova University	Public	2008
Yozgat	Yozgat Bozok University	Public	2006
Zonguldak	Zonguldak Bülent Ecevit University	Public	1992

== International rankings ==
According to the Times Higher Education World University Rankings:

University	2025	2024	2023	2022	2021	2020	2019
Ankara University	1501+	1501+	1201-1500	1201+	1001+	1001+	1001+
Bilkent University	601-800	601-800	801-1000	601-800	601-800	501-600	501-600
Boğaziçi University	601-800	601-800	801-1000	801-1000	601-800	601-800	501-600
Gazi University	1201-1500	1201-1500	1201-1500	1201+	1001+	1001+	1001+
Hacettepe University	801-1000	601-800	601-800	601-800	501-600	501-600	501-600
Istanbul Technical University	501-600	501-600	601-800	601-800	801-1000	601-800	601-800
Istanbul University	1201-1500	1001-1200	1001-1200	1001-1200	801-1000	801-1000	801-1000
Koç University	351-400	351-400	401-500	501-600	401-500	501-600	401-500
Middle East Technical University	351-400	351-400	501-600	601-800	801-1000	601-800	601-800
Sabancı University	351-400	351-400	401-500	501-600	501-600	401-500	351-400

== See also ==
- Hoca Ahmet Yesevi Turkish Kazakh University
- Kyrgyzstan-Turkey Manas University
