= Toros University =

Public university in Mersin, Turkey

- Motto: Eğitimin Ötesinde, Yaşamın İçinde
- Motto in English: Beyond Education, In The Life
- Type: Private (Non-Profit), Foundation
- Established: July 23, 2009
- Founders: Ali Özveren
- Affiliations: Bologna Process; Erasmus Programme; Pearson Education; YÖK
- Chairman: Yusuf Sertaç Özveren
- Vice-Chancellor: Prof. Dr. Adnan Mazmanoğlu
- Rector: Prof. Dr. Ömer Arıöz
- Location: Mersin, Turkey
- Campus: Bahçelievler, 45 Evler, Uray and 50.Yıl
- Language: Turkish, English
- Colours: Navy Blue, Gold
- Website: www.toros.edu.tr

Toros University (Turkish:Toros Üniversitesi) is a private university, founded by a foundation (Turkish: vakıf). It is located in Mersin; a city on the Mediterranean coast of southern Turkey, famous for Turkey's largest seaport.

== Description ==
The university is named after the Toros Mountains (Turkish: Toros Dağları), a mountain complex in southern Turkey, separating the Mediterranean coastal region from the central Anatolian Plateau.

Toros University is one of the two private universities in Mersin Province along with Çağ University. Mersin also has two public universities: Mersin University and Tarsus University.

== History ==
Toros University was officially founded on July 23, 2009 by the Mersin Education Foundation (Turkish: Mersin Eğitim Vakfı), an active educational foundation which was founded in 1979 in Mersin by a group of idealistic teachers who aimed to provide educational services.

Toros University accepted its first students for the academic year of 2009–2010.

== Campuses ==
Toros University has five campuses: Bahçelievler, 45 Evler, Uray, Mezitli and 50.Yıl campuses.

All five campuses are centrally located in Mersin Province.

== Faculties, Departments, Schools and Institutes ==
Toros University comprises four faculties, two vocational schools and a graduate institute.

=== Faculties ===
==== Faculty of Economics, Administrative and Social Sciences ====
- Department of Business Administration
- Department of International Finance and Banking
- Department of International Trade and Logistics
- Department of Psychology

==== Faculty of Engineering ====
- Department of Civil Engineering
- Department of Electrical and Electronics Engineering
- Department of Industrial Engineering
- Department of Software Engineering

==== Faculty Of Fine Arts, Design and Architecture ====
- Department of Architecture
- Department of Interior Architecture
- Department of Gastronomy and Culinary Arts

==== Faculty of Health Sciences ====
- Department of Health Management
- Department of Nursing
- Department of Nutrition and Dietetics
- Department of Physiotherapy and Rehabilitation

=== Vocational Schools of Higher Education ===
==== School of Occupational Higher Education ====
- Construction Technology Program
- Culinary Program
- Food Technology Program
- Graphic Design Program
- Justice Program
- Mechatronics Program

Healthcare Vocational School

- Anesthesia Program
- Biomedical Device Technologies Program
- Child Development Program
- Dialysis Program
- First and Emergency Aid Program
- Medical Imaging Techniques Program
- Medical Laboratory Techniques Program
- Opticianry Program
- Oral and Dental Health Program
- Physiotherapy Program
- Surgery Services Program

School of Foreign Languages

- Foreign Languages Program
- English Translation and Interpreting Program

== Research & Development Centers ==
- Continuing Education Application and Research Center (TORSEM)
- Alevism & Bektashism Application and Research Center
- Education of Technology of Renewable Energy Application and Research Center
- Language Research and Application Center (TÜDAM)
- Urbanization and Local Administrations Application and Research Center (KEYAM)

== Student organizations ==
Toros University Student Organizations are as listed:

- Administration and Entrepreneurship Club
- American Football Group
- Animal Protection Group
- Atatürkist Thinkers Club
- Chess Club
- Child Development Group
- Civil Engineering Students Organization
- Community Health Association
- Computer Sciences Club
- Creative Hands Association
- Dance Club
- Drop Club
- Electrical and Electronics Engineers Club
- English Club
- Fenerbahce Fans Group
- Gastronomy Art Club
- Green Crescent Association
- Health Management Group
- Healthy Life Club
- Industrial Engineering and Efficiency Organization
- International Trade and Logistics Group
- LÖSEV Toros Association (Toros Leukemia Association)
- Music Club
- Nutrition Club
- Project and Innovation Club
- Psychology Club
- Radio Club
- Research, Development and Personal Development Group
- Science and Art Club
- Social Media and Photography Group
- The Golden Hands Club
- The New Architects Group
- The New Ones Club
- The Quality Club
- The Young Entrepreneurs Club
- Theater Club
- Toros International Plus
- Toros Nature Sports Club
- Toros Technology Club
- Turkish Folk Music Organization
- Ultraaslan Toros Club
- Workshop Club

== See also ==
- List of universities in Turkey
