= Fishing in Turkey =

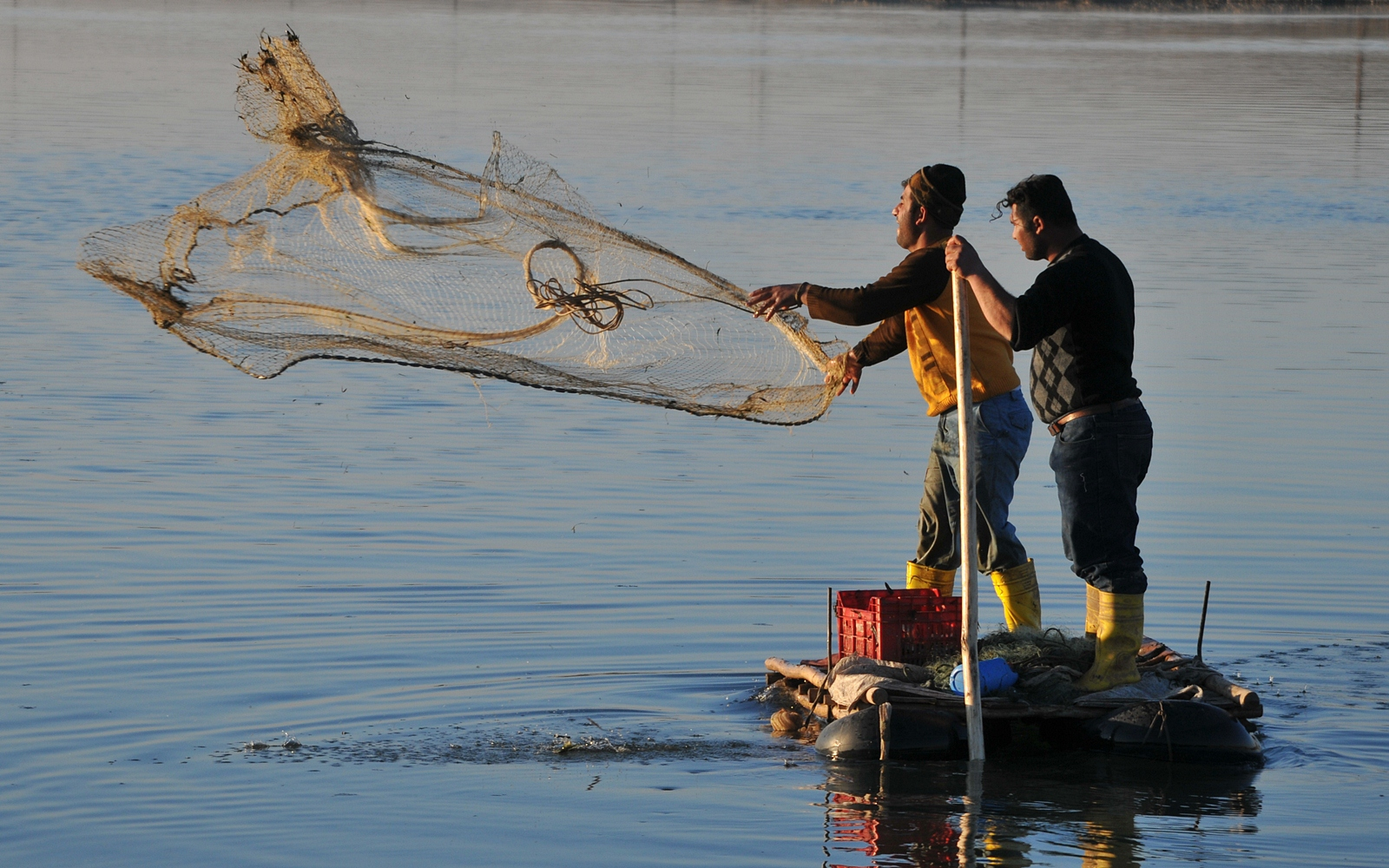
Fishers of the River Tigris

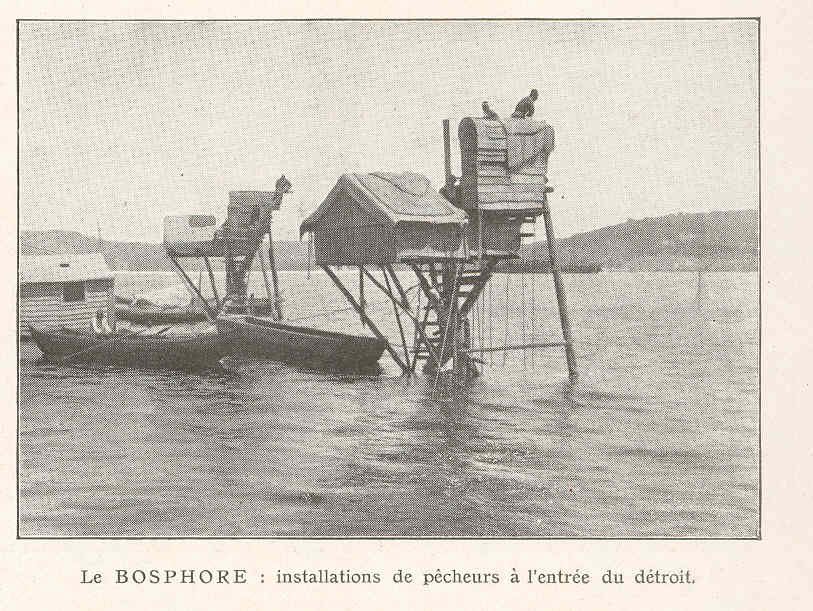
Early 20th century fishers of the Bosporus

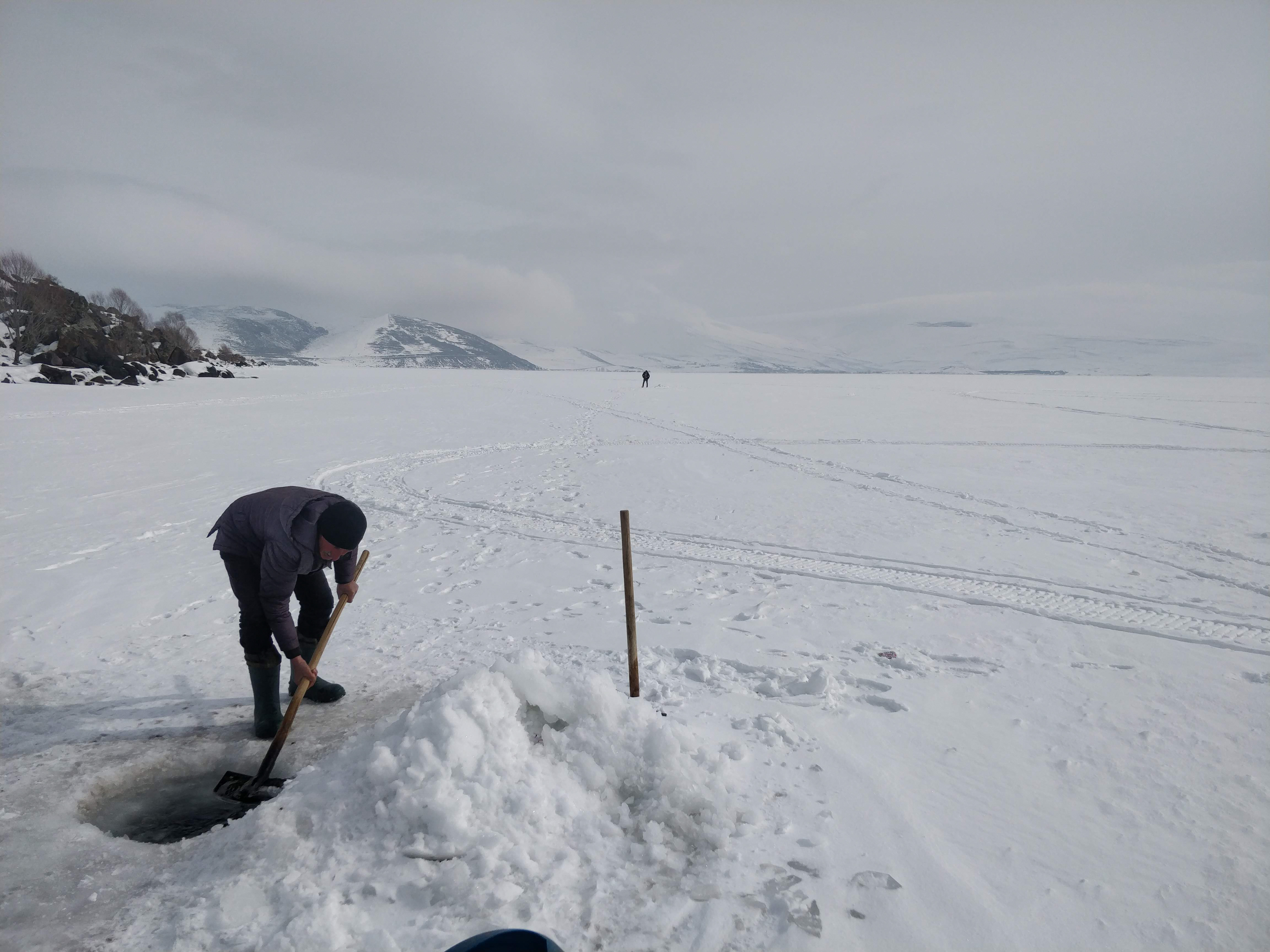
Lake Çıldır ice fishing

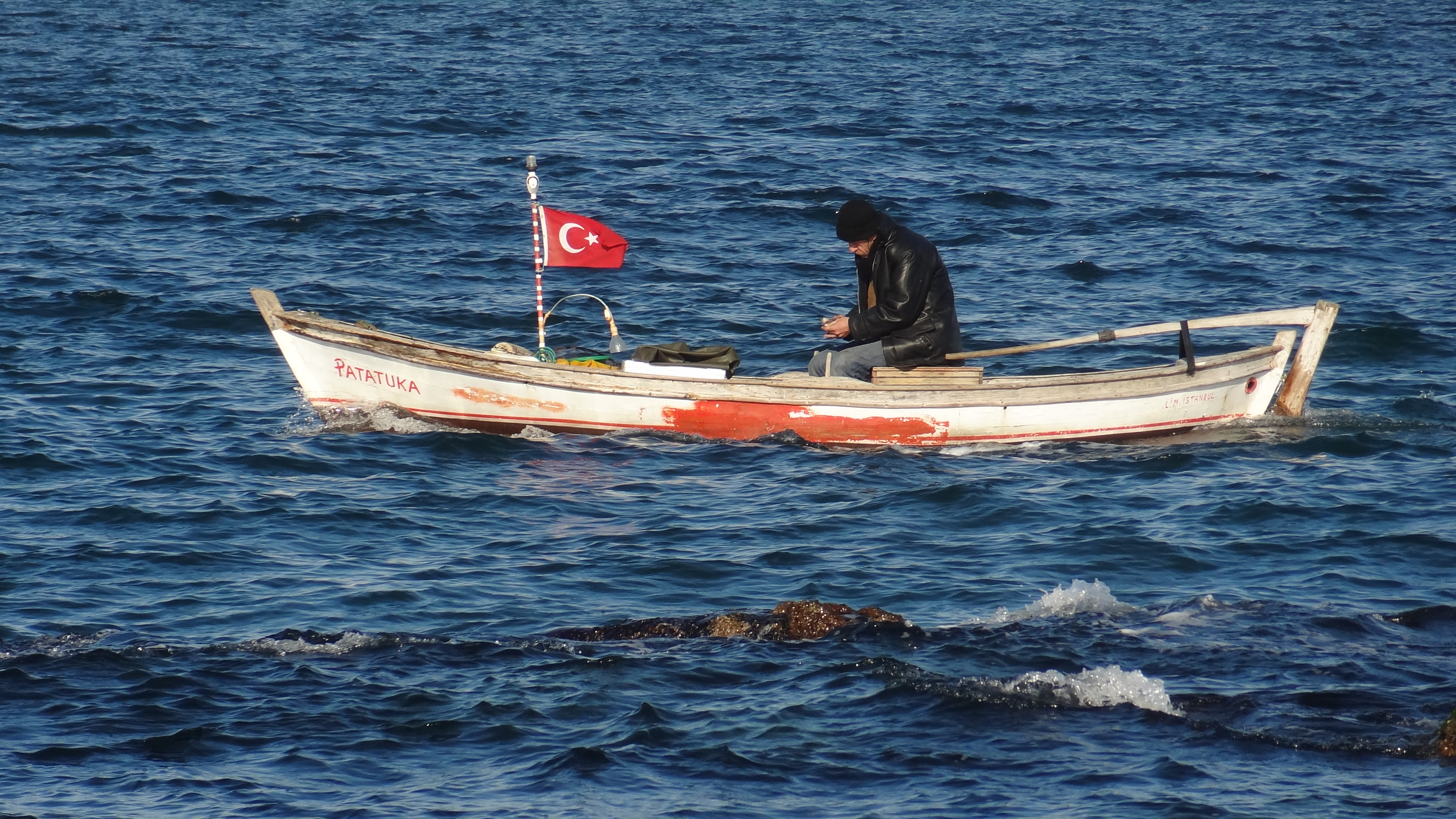
Fisherman - Princes' Islands

A third of fishing in Turkey is commercial fishing from wild fisheries but most is aquaculture. In 2018, the seafood sector provided employment for 53 thousand people and produced 0.6 million tons of fish. According to the OECD, this produced a value of almost US$1.5 billion.

Turkey is surrounded by seas on three sides and has a coastline of 8,333 km (5,178 mi), and its natural lakes make up approximately 10,000 km^{2} (3,900 sq mi), with 3,442 km^{2} (1,329 sq mi) of reservoirs, and 178,000 km (111,000 mi) of rivers. Per capita fish consumption is low in Turkey despite being surrounded by seas.

== Distribution ==
=== Geography ===
Fishing is carried out in the Turkish territorial waters of the Black Sea, Aegean Sea and the Mediterranean, in the Sea of Marmara and the straits (Bosphorus and Dardanelles) and inland waters. The coastline of Turkey, surrounded by seas on three sides, is 8,333 kilometres (5,178 mi). Territorial waters are 12 miles (19 km) out from the Mediterranean and Black Seas coastlines, and 6 miles (10 km) out in the Aegean Sea. The Marmara and the Turkish Straits with an area of 11,500 km ^{2} are considered Turkey's inland waters. Its natural lakes are approximately 10,000 km ^{2}, with 3,442 km ^{2} of reservoirs, and 178,000 km rivers. Fishing in the Aegean Sea is mainly coastal. Without proper planning fishing ports can disturb the coastline.

=== Species ===
200 fish species live in the Sea of Marmara, 300 in the Aegean Sea, 247 in the Black Sea, and 500 in the Mediterranean. There are about 100 fish species that have economic value and are caught. Commercially caught fish include anchovy, sardine, mackerel, bonito, sprat, haddock, bream mackerel, and bluefish. Anchovies are the most caught fish, followed by Atlantic bonito and pilchard. Artisanal fishing includes ice fishing in Lake Çıldır. Commercially important shellfish include the whelk Rapana venosa.

=== Overfishing and climate change ===
The Black Sea is overfished but not as much as it was previously. Anchovy stocks have decreased, with Ordu University Professor Mehmet Aydın blaming overfishing by Georgia. The Mediterranean is overfished but not at lower levels compared to some years ago. There is also Lessepsian migration from the Red Sea.

Some fish have become extinct in the Sea of Marmara. It has a problem of marine mucilage.The distribution of fish is changing due to climate change, for example flying gurnard have moved north into the Dardanelles. Fisheries subsidy to the fishing industry should encourage more sustainable fishing according to a 2024 study.

== Domestic consumption ==
Per capita fish consumption is very low in Turkey, despite being on a peninsula surrounded by the sea on three sides. Annual per person fish consumption in Turkey is 8 kg, the world average is 16 kg, EU average 26 kg. The reasons for low fish consumption include a lower income level compared to other countries with larger seafood consumption, a high population with low domestic production, fluctuating seafood prices, and a strong cultural preference for fresh fish. However the government is promoting fish eating.

In 2018, 600 thousand tonnes of fish (including molluscs and crustaceans) were produced, worth US$1,481 million. 76% of this value came from aquaculture and 24% from fisheries. In 2018, twice as much was exported as imported: there were 15 thousand ships totalling 170 thousand tonnes 90% of which were shorter than 12 m. Most government support was for management, control and surveillance and infrastructure.

== Aquaculture ==
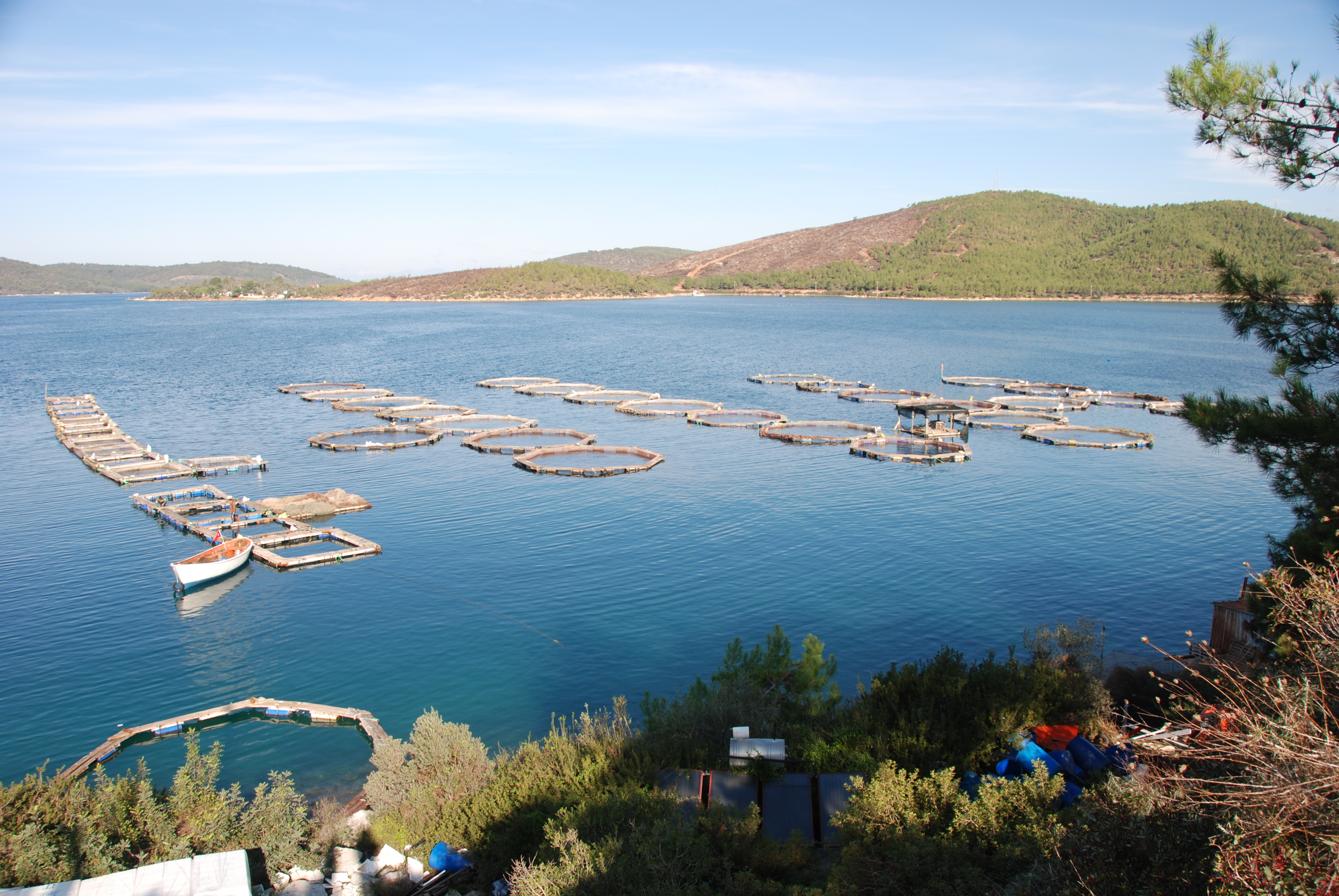
Fish farming in Aegean Turkey

There are over 400 marine aquaculture facilities. Sea bass (Dicentrarchus labrax) and sea bream (Sparus aurata) are farmed, and mostly trout (rainbow trout and brown trout) in inland waters, these 3 being the most farmed, with about 150 thousand tonnes a year of each. Aquaculture overtook fishing in 2020, with Muğla, İzmir and Elazığ being the top provinces.

Government support is provided, although subsidies for seabream and seabass ended in 2016. In 2021, US$1.2 billion worth of farmed fish were exported, and Turkey was the world's top producer of seabass and seabream. Most exports are to the EU and EU directives are followed.

== Recreational fishing ==
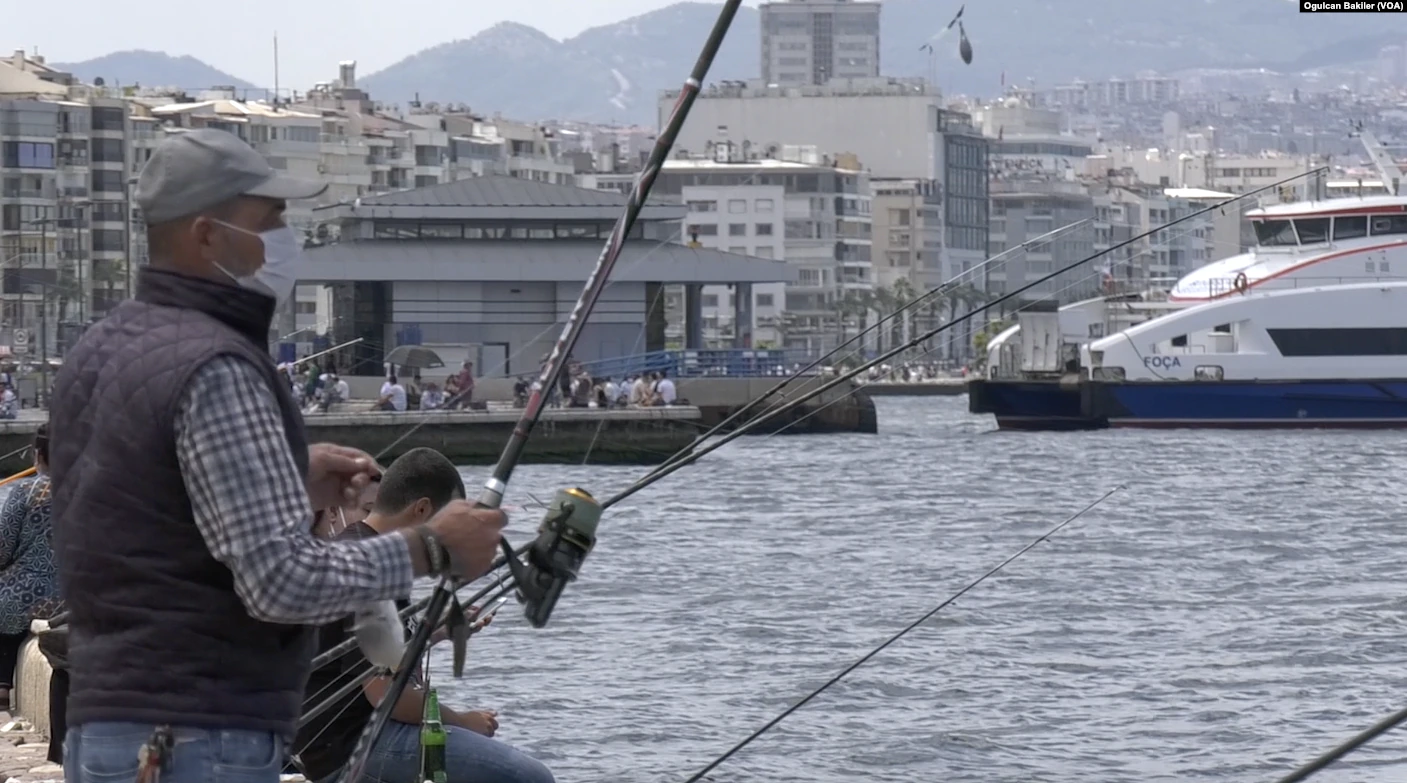
Kordon, İzmir

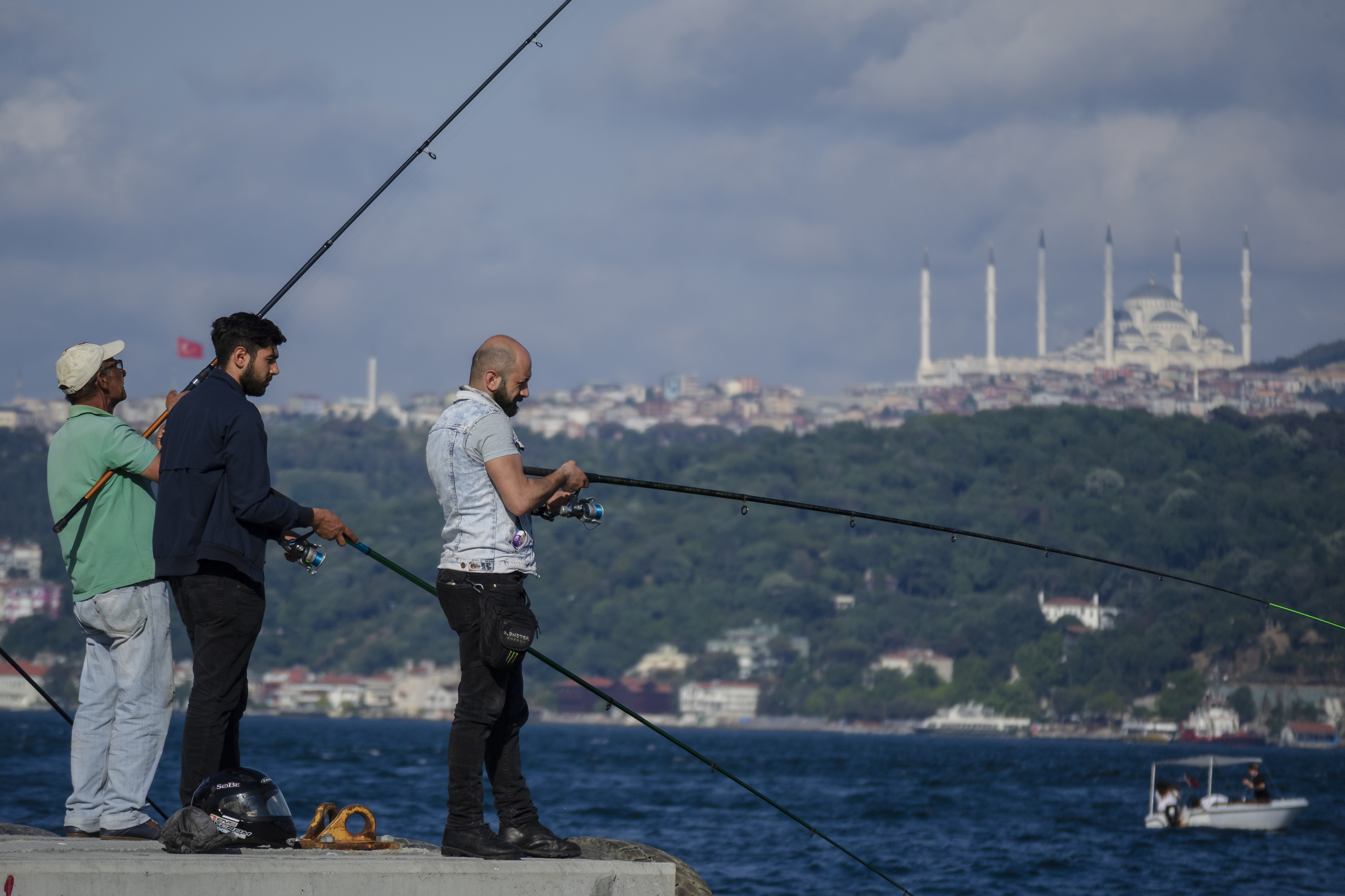
Angling

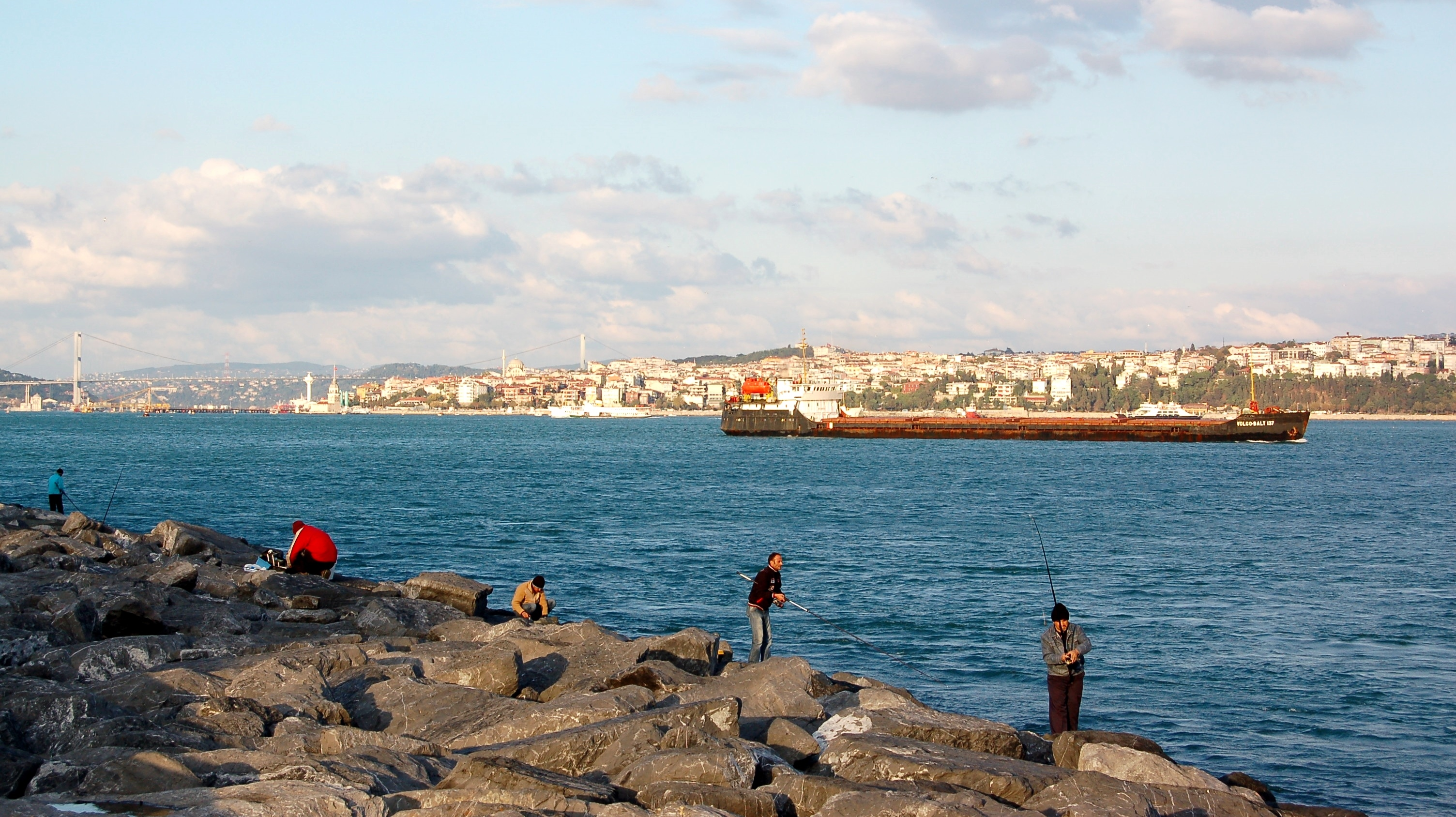
Near Ahırkapı Feneri

Recreational fishing includes Mediterranean horse mackerel. Angling is popular on the Bosporus.
