= Kocaeli Health and Technology University =

Private university in Kocaeli, Turkey

Coordinates: 37.5734°N 36.9337°E

- Kocaeli Sağlık ve Teknoloji Üniversitesi
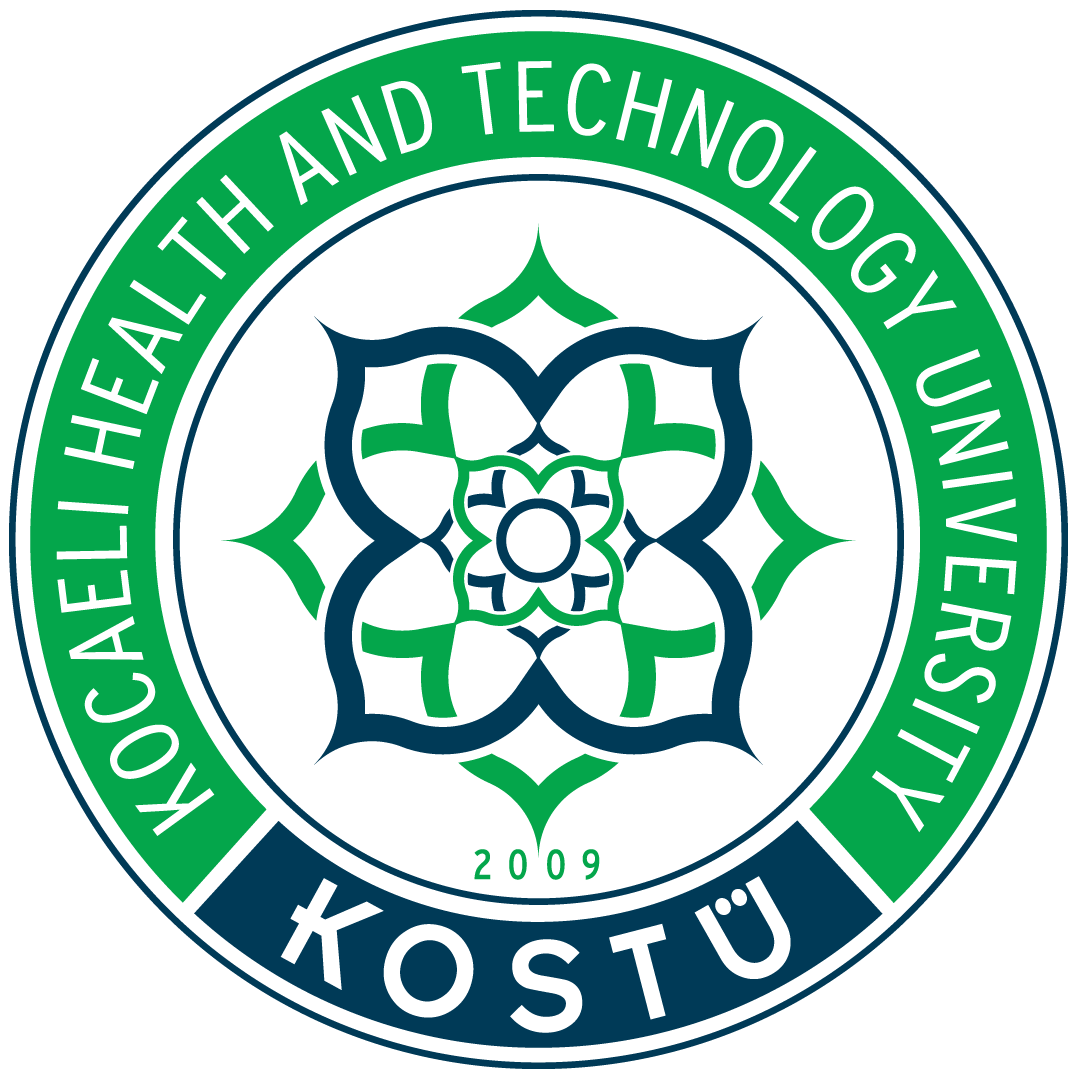
- Type: Private
- Established: 2009
- Affiliations: YÖK
- Rector: Bekir Ince
- Students: 5,775 (2026)
- Location: Kocaeli, Turkey
- Campus: Urban
Colours
Green, dark turquoise and white
- Website: kocaelisaglik.edu.tr

Kocaeli Health and Technology University (Turkish: Kocaeli Sağlık ve Teknoloji Üniversitesi) is a private university located in Kocaeli, Turkey. It was founded as the European Vocational School (Turkish: Avrupa Meslek Yüksekokulu) in 2009, before being renamed to Kocaeli Health and Technology University in 2020. The university's rector is Bekir Ince. It is accredited by the Council of Higher Education (YÖK). As of 2026, the university had 5,775 registered students.

The university is organised into five faculties (Dentistry; Health Sciences; Engineering and Natural Sciences; Social and Human Sciences; Pharmacy), and two vocational schools. The university participates in the Erasmus Programme.

== See also ==
- List of universities in Turkey
- Higher education in Turkey
