= Sivas University of Science and Technology =

Public university in Sivas, Turkey

- Sivas Bilim ve Teknoloji Üniversitesi
- Type: Public
- Established: 2018
- Academic staff: 300
- Administrative staff: 382
- Location: Sivas, Turkey
- Website: Official website

Sivas University of Science and Technology (Turkish: Sivas Bilim ve Teknoloji Üniversitesi) is a public university in Sivas, Turkey. It was founded on 18 May 2018 as the second public university in Sivas Province. Sivas University of Science and Technology (SUST) is providing education in technical sciences with the aim of educating students who will contribute to science and technology with a focus on research activities.

== History ==
SUST was founded as an independent university on 18 May 2018. On Dec 12, 2018, SUST's first rector was appointed. It opened for the spring term of 2019–2020. As of 2020, the university has a total of 682 staff, 300 of which are academic and 382 are administrative.

During the development phase of the university, as a result of the meetings held with industry leaders and Council of Higher Education, it was decided that the university would focus on education programs that would support the defense industry of Turkey.

In 2019, the Sivas School of Vocational Studies was founded offering programs such as an aircraft Technology associate degree program to train a qualified work force for the defense industry organizations in Turkey.

In 2020, with the protocol signed between Sivas Cumhuriyet University (SCÜ) and SUST, a 10 percent share of Cumhuriyet Technopolis were transferred to SUST.

== Campus ==
The Sivas University Science and Technology University main campus will be built at the Kurt Deresi location, Sivas in an area of 455 thousand square meters. The project of the campus has been completed and construction is scheduled to start in 2021.

== See also ==
- List of universities in Turkey
