= Ömer Faruk Batırel =

Marmara University Rector
- In office 1992–1999

Personal details
- Born: October 13, 1944 Gaziantep, Turkey
- Died: July 5, 2017 (aged 72) Marmaraereğlisi, Tekirdağ, Turkey
- Cause of death: Heart attack
- Resting place: Karacaahmet Cemetery, Istanbul
- Occupation: Financier, academic

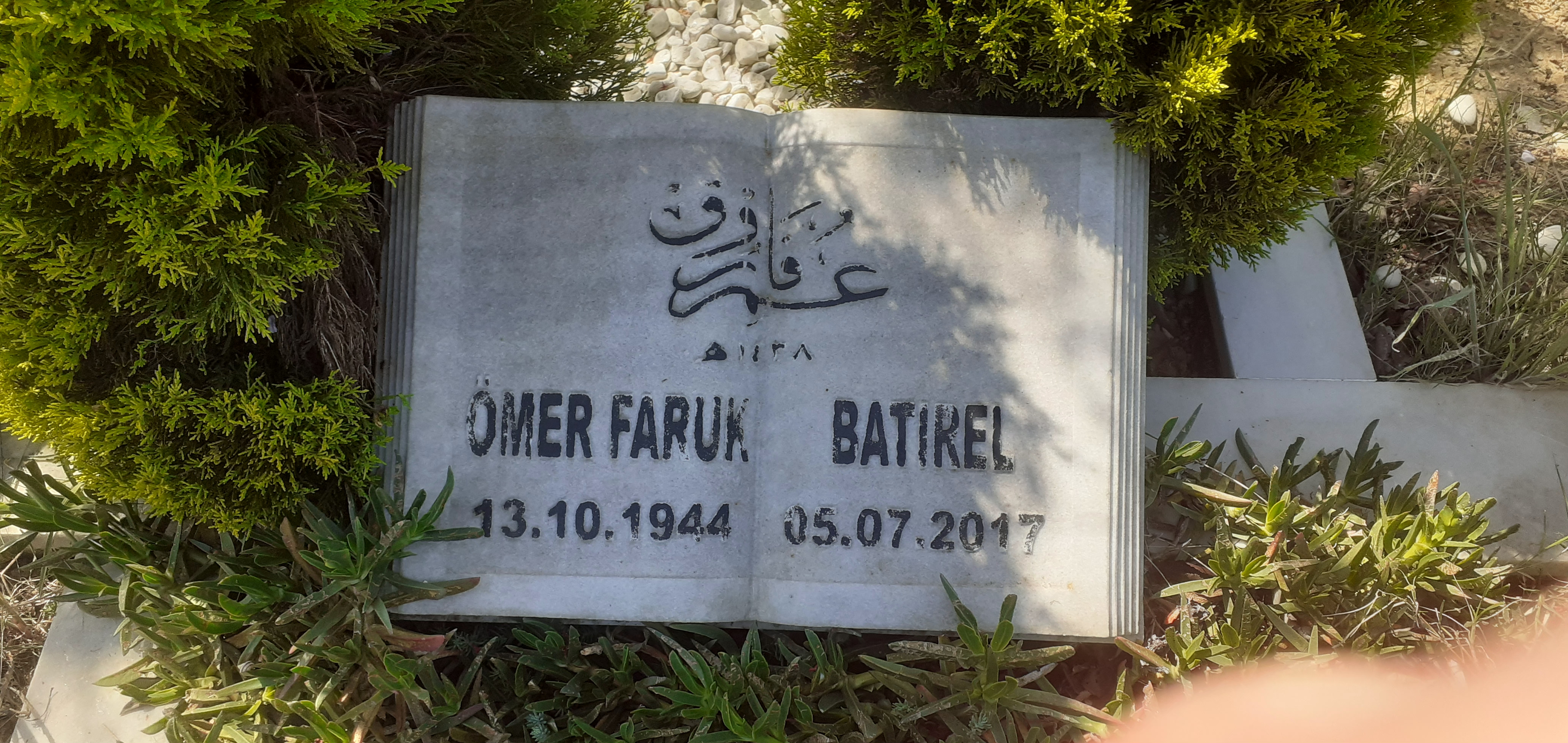
Ömer Faruk Batırel's Grave

Ömer Faruk Batırel (b. 13 October 1944; Gaziantep – 5 July 2017; Marmaraereğlisi, Tekirdağ), Turkish financier and academic.

== Life and career ==
He completed high school in 1963 at Istanbul Erkek Lisesi, and higher education in 1967 at the Istanbul Academy of Economic and Commercial Sciences (İİTİA). In 1973, he earned his doctorate in finance, undertook post-doctoral education at the University of York in England during the 1973–1974 academic year, became associate professor in finance in 1976, and was promoted to professor in 1981. He served as dean of Marmara University Faculty of Economics and Administrative Sciences between 1982 and 1992. Batırel's deanship period has been the subject of intense discussions regarding the signature on Recep Tayyip Erdoğan's diploma. According to groups claiming the diploma is fake, it is impossible for Batırel, who started his deanship in 1982, to have signed a diploma from 1981 as dean.

He was elected Marmara University rector in 1992 and 1996 for two consecutive terms and had to resign in 1999. He served as head of Marmara University Faculty of Economics and Administrative Sciences Finance Department from 1993 to 2007. Between 2003 and 2007, he carried out YÖK membership by ministerial cabinet quota. Between 2005 and 2007, he served as a member of the board of trustees of Kyrgyz-Turkish Manas University as a YÖK member.

He died on 5 July 2017 due to a heart attack.
