= Doğuş University =

Private university in Kadıköy, Istanbul, Turkey

- Doğuş Üniversitesi
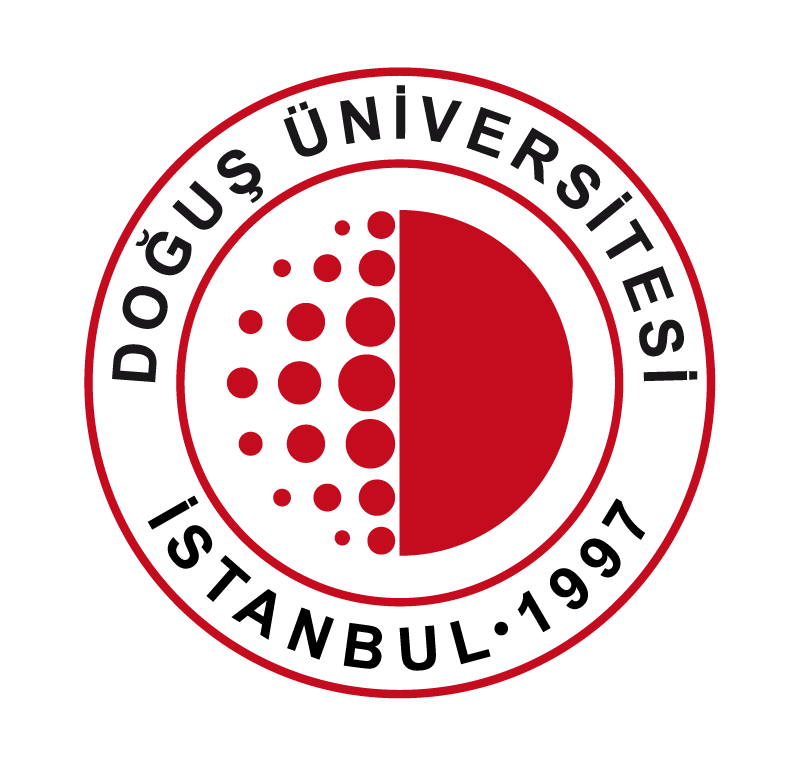
- Official seal of Doğuş University
- Motto: Professional world
- Type: Foundation
- Established: 1997
- Founder: Doğu Gözaçan
- Affiliations: Bologna Process; Erasmus Exchange Programme; IMPREST; TÜBİTAK; YÖK; MÜDEK; EUR-ACE label Washington Accord (credentials)
- Chairman: Prof. Dr. Ahmet Alkan Çelik
- Rector: Prof.Dr. Ahmet Alkan Çelik
- Location: Istanbul, Çengelköy, Ümraniye, Turkey; 41°00′01″N 29°02′49″E
- Campus: Çengelköy Ümraniye
- Website: dogus.edu.tr

Doğuş University (or simply Doğuş) is a foundation university located in Ümraniye, Istanbul.

== Description ==
Doğuş University has twenty programmes in the faculties of Arts and Sciences, Engineering, Economics and Administrative Sciences, Arts and Design, together with nine associate degree programs in the School of Advanced Vocational Studies. Additionally, there are eight postgraduate education programs in the Institute of Social Sciences and three in the Institute of Science and Technology. The European Union Studies program in the Institute of Social Sciences is a member of the consortium IMPREST (International Masters Program in European Studies), which started its academic endeavour in the academic year 2006–2007 and actively cooperated with five other European universities, including Doğuş University.

Due to Doğuş University's ERASMUS (Erasmus University Charter) membership, which started in the spring term of the 2003–2004 academic year, students of Doğuş University can benefit from exchange programs under bilateral agreements signed with over 30 universities.

== Campus ==
- Çengelköy, Üsküdar, Istanbul
- Dudullu, Ümraniye, Istanbul

== Academics ==
Faculty of Arts And Sciences

- Department of Communication Sciences
- Department of English Language and Literature
- Department of Mathematics
- Department of Psychology
- Division of Physics
- Division of Chemistry
- Division of Humanities

Faculty of Law

- Law

Faculty of Economics And Administrative Sciences

- Department of Business Administration: English and Turkish programmes
- Department of International Relations
- Department of Economics and Finance: English and Turkish programmes
- Department of International Trade and Business

Faculty of Engineering

- Department of Computer Engineering: Computer Engineering Program, Information Systems Engineering Program
- Department of Electronics and Communications Engineering: English and Turkish programmes
- Department of Control Engineering
- Department of Mechanical Engineering: English and Turkish programmes
- Department of Industrial Engineering: English and Turkish programmes

Faculty of Fine Arts And Design

- Department of Architecture
- Department of Graphics
- Department of Painting
- Department of Industrial Product Design
- Department of Interior Architecture
- Visual Communication Design

Institute of Science & Technology

- Doctorate: Logistics and Supply Chain Management Doctorate Program
- Master: Computer and Information Sciences, Electronics and Communications Engineering, Engineering and Technology Management

Institute of Social Sciences

- Doctorate: Financial Economics Doctorate Program
- Master
  - Business Administration: English and Turkish programmes
  - MA in European Union Studies
  - MS in Financial Economics
  - MA in English Language and Literature
  - MA in Psychology
  - MA in Communication Sciences

Foreign Languages Unit

- English Preparatory Programme
- Degree English Unit

== See also ==
- Turkish universities
