= Trabzon University =

Public university in Trabzon, Turkey

- Trabzon Üniversitesi
- University logo
- Type: State University
- Established: 8 May 2018
- Affiliations: Yükseköğretim Kurulu
- Rector: Prof. Dr. Emin Aşıkkutlu
- Location: Akçaabat, Trabzon, Turkey; 41.010490°N 39.609821°E
- Campus: Fatih Campus Central Campus
- Language: Turkish, English
- Colors: Maroon, Turquoise, Navy, Red, Orange, Green
- Website: trabzon.edu.tr

Trabzon University (Turkish: Trabzon Üniversitesi, TRÜ) is a public university established in Akçaabat, Trabzon, Turkey on 8 May 2018, following the separation from Karadeniz Technical University. As of 2025, the university hosts approximately 12,000 students.

A number of faculties, institutes, and vocational schools previously affiliated with Karadeniz Technical University were transferred to Trabzon University upon its establishment. On 17 April 2025, the Faculty of Medicine, formerly part of Health Sciences University, was incorporated as Trabzon University Faculty of Medicine.

== Academic Units ==
=== Faculties ===
- Faculty of Education (Fatih)
- Faculty of Fine Arts
- Faculty of Law
- Faculty of Theology
- Faculty of Communication
- Faculty of Sports Sciences
- Faculty of Medicine
- Faculty of Computer and Information Sciences
- Faculty of Humanities and Social Sciences
- Faculty of Political Sciences

=== Schools ===
- School of Applied Sciences
- School of Foreign Languages

=== Vocational Schools ===
- Beşikdüzü Vocational School
- Şalpazarı Vocational School
- Tonya Vocational School
- Tourism and Hotel Management Vocational School
- Vakfıkebir Vocational School
- Düzköy Vocational School
- Çarşıbaşı Vocational School

=== Institutes ===
- Graduate School of Education (Lisansüstü Eğitim Enstitüsü)
- Institute of Quranic Studies and Qiraat

=== State Conservatory ===
- Department of Musicology
- Department of Music
- Department of Performing Arts
