= Kocaeli Province =

Province of Turkey

Kocaeli
- Province and metropolitan municipality
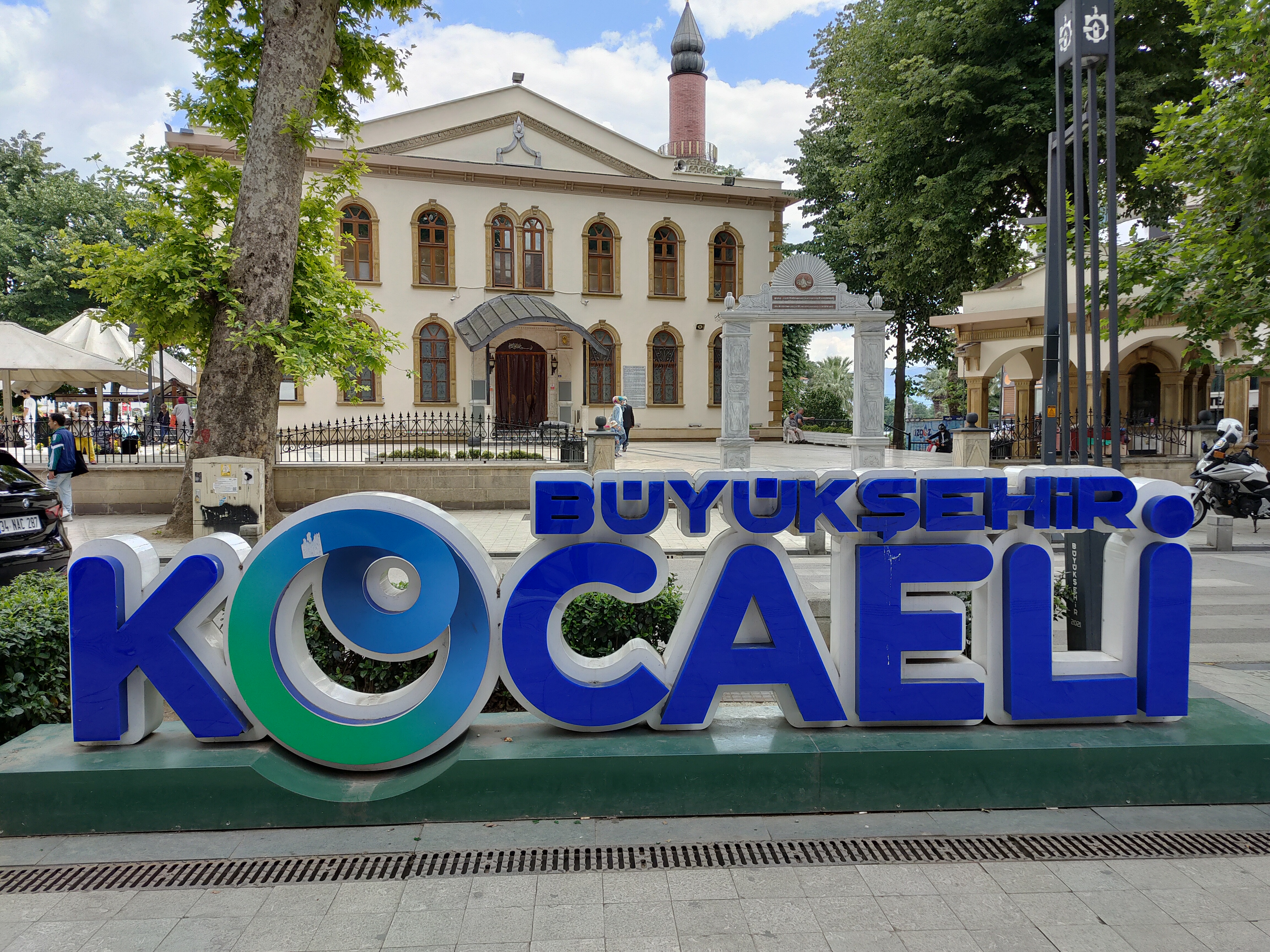
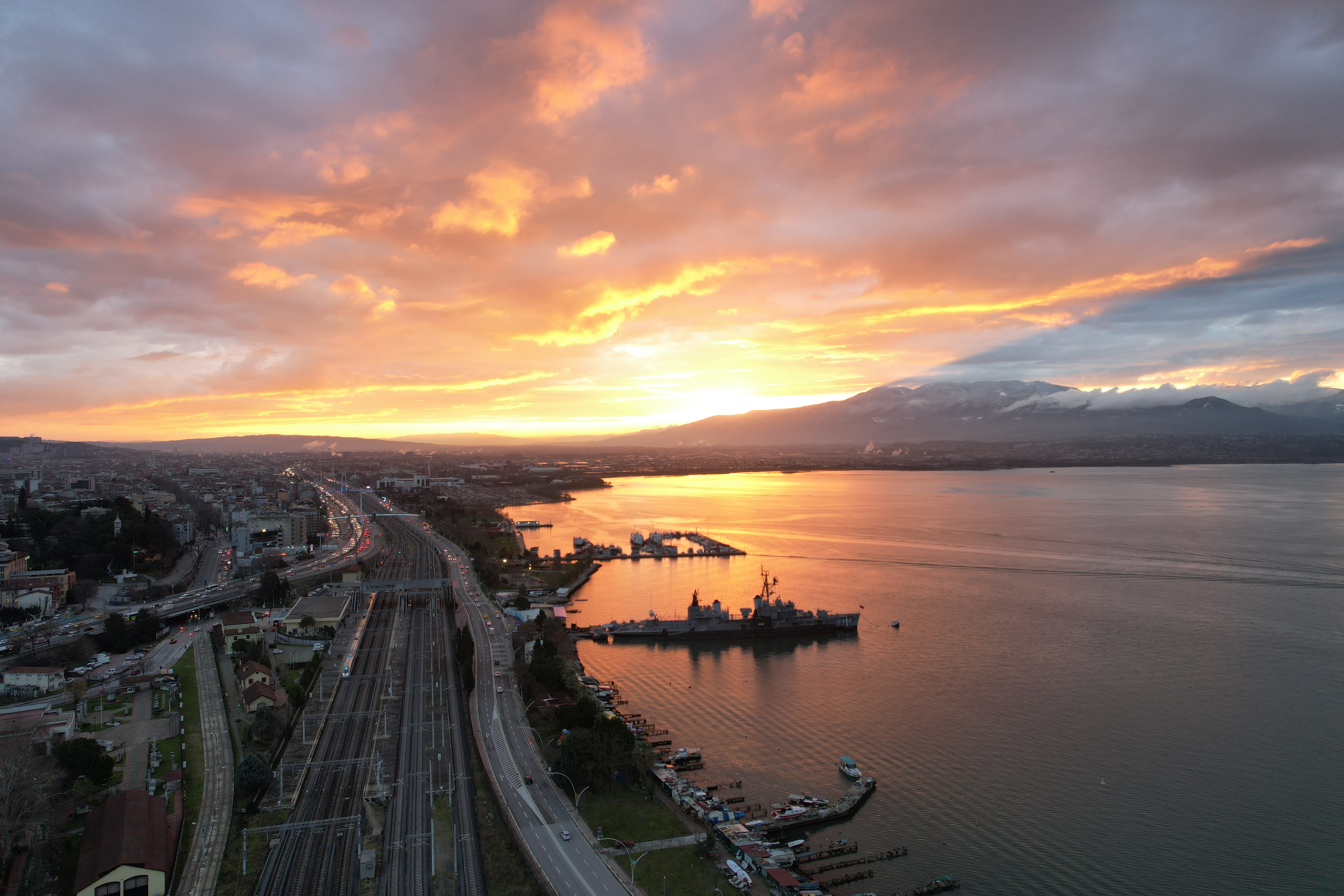
- Fevziye Mosque Gayret Museum Ship and İzmit city center

- Location of the province within Turkey
- Coordinates: 40°45′55″N 29°56′27″E
- Country: Turkey
- Seat: İzmit

Government
  - Mayor: Tahir Büyükakın (AK Party)
  - Vali: İlhami Aktaş
- Area: 3,397 km^{2} (1,312 sq mi)
- Population (2023): 2,102,907
  - Density: 619.0/km^{2} (1,603/sq mi)
- Time zone: UTC+3 (TRT)
- Area code: 0262
- Website: www.kocaeli.bel.tr www.kocaeli.gov.tr

Kocaeli Province (Turkish: Kocaeli ili, pronounced [koˈdʒaeli]) is a province and metropolitan municipality of Turkey and one of only three not to have the same official name as its capital, İzmit, which is thus also sometimes called Kocaeli. Its area is 3,397 km^{2} (1,312 sq mi), and its population is 2,102,907 (2023). The province is the successor of the Ottoman-era Sanjak of Kocaeli. The largest towns in the province are İzmit and Gebze. The traffic code is 41.

The province is located at the easternmost end of the Sea of Marmara around the Gulf of İzmit. Kocaeli is bordered by the province of Istanbul and the Marmara Sea to the west, the Black Sea to the north, the province of Sakarya to the east, the province of Bursa to the south and the province of Yalova to the southwest. The metropolitan area of Istanbul extends to the Kocaeli-Istanbul provincial border.

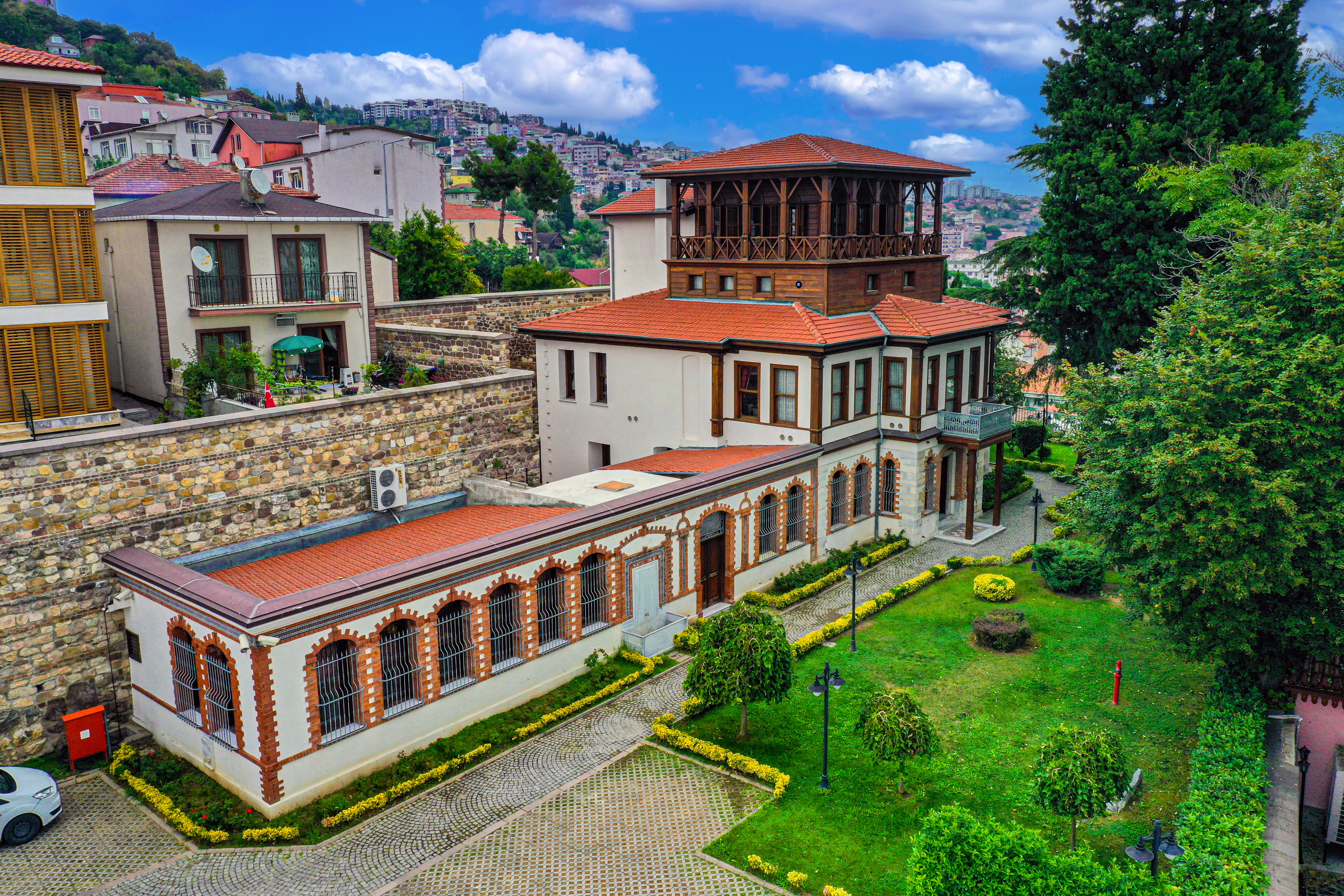
Selim Sırrı Paşa Mansion in İzmit

The size and natural conditions of the Bay of İzmit allow for extensive port facilities, including the Gölcük Naval Base. The province is called the industrial capital of Turkey. Kocaeli has an airport named Cengiz Topel Naval Air Station which is used for military and civilian transport. Kocaeli has three universities: Kocaeli University, Gebze Technical University and Kocaeli Health and Technology University.

== Districts ==
Districts of Kocaeli

Kocaeli province is divided into 12 districts:

- Başiskele
- Çayırova
- Darıca
- Derince
- Dilovası
- Gebze
- Gölcük
- İzmit
- Kandıra
- Karamürsel
- Kartepe
- Körfez

== Demographics ==
Data taken from Kocaeli Metropolitan Municipality and Central Dissemination System. The information is for 31 December of each year.

District	2009	2010	2011	2012	2013	2014	2015
Kocaeli	1,522,408	1,560,138	1,601,720	1,634,691	1,676,202	1,722,795	1,780,055
İzmit	313,964	315,734	322,588	327,435	332,754	338,710	347,074
Gebze	297,029	305,557	314,122	319,307	329,195	338,412	350,115
Derince	123,136	124,452	126,675	128,810	130,657	133,739	136,742
Darıca	140,302	146,896	152,542	157,304	164,385	173,139	182,710
Körfez	130,730	132,779	135,692	139,220	142,884	146,210	151,149
Gölcük	136,035	137,637	141,926	143,867	145,805	149,238	152,607
Çayırova	82,494	88,523	93,640	98,367	103,536	109,698	117,230
Karamürsel	50,886	51,987	52,501	52,621	53,033	54,225	55,169
Dilovası	44,258	44,958	45,060	44,981	45,610	45,714	46,099
Kandıra	46,984	49,769	49,554	50,042	50,046	49,203	48,937
Başiskele	66,183	68,037	70,835	73,327	76,605	79,625	84,235
Kartepe	90,407	93,809	96,585	99,410	101,692	104,882	107,988

== Mayors of Kocaeli Metropolitan Municipality ==
- 1977-1980 Erol Köse CHP
- 1984-1989 Necati Gençoğlu ANAP
- 1989-2002 Sefa Sirmen SHP, CHP
- 2002-2004 Hikmet Erenkaya CHP
- 2004-2019 İbrahim Karaosmanoğlu AK Party
- 2019-present Tahir Büyükakın AK Party

== Twin cities ==
- Kassel, Germany
- Novi Pazar, Serbia

== See also ==
- East Marmara Region
- Kocaeli University
- Pişmaniye
- Provinces of Turkey
