= Konya Food and Agriculture University =

Agricultural university in Konya, Turkey

- Konya Gıda ve Tarım Üniversitesi
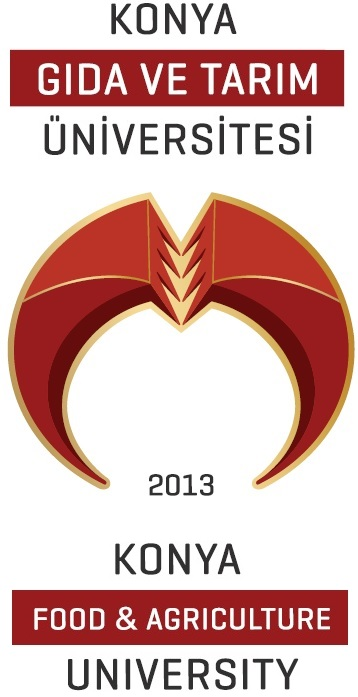
- Type: Private
- Established: 2013
- Rector: Prof. Dr. Erol Turan
- Location: Konya, Turkey; 37.8757°N 32.4748°E
- Language: English, Turkish
- Website: www.gidatarim.edu.tr/en

Konya Food and Agriculture University (KFAU, Turkish: Konya Gıda ve Tarım Üniversitesi) is a private university in Konya, Turkey. Founded in 2013 by the Scientific Research Technology Education and Culture Foundation (BARTEK), KFAU is recognized as Turkey's first specialized university in food and agriculture.

The university focuses on interdisciplinary research and education in the fields of life sciences, food, and agriculture. The medium of instruction is primarily English.

== Academic units ==
As of 2024, KFAU has three main faculties:

Faculty of Agriculture and Natural Sciences

- Crop Production and Technologies
- Animal Production and Technologies
- Molecular Biology and Genetics
- Genetics and Breeding

Faculty of Engineering and Architecture

- Food Engineering
- Materials Engineering
- Bioengineering
- Computer Engineering
- Electrical-Electronics Engineering
- Industrial Engineering

Faculty of Social and Human Sciences

- International Finance and Economics
- International Trade and Business
- Psychology
- Sociology

== See also ==
- List of universities in Turkey
- Agricultural education
