= Giresun University =

Public university in Giresun, Turkey

- Type: Public
- Established: 2006
- Rector: Prof. Dr. Yılmaz Can
- Location: Giresun, Turkey
- Website: www.giresun.edu.tr

Giresun University is a public university in Giresun, Turkey, founded in 2006.

== Affiliations ==
The university is a member of the Caucasus University Association. The foundations of the Faculty of Sports Sciences were laid as the Department of Physical Education and Sports Teaching, which was established in 2012-2013 academic year within the Faculty of Education. Upon the letter of the Ministry of National Education of the Republic of Turkey dated 5/2/2015 and numbered 1307733, according to the additional article 30 of the Law dated 28/3/1983 and numbered 2809, the Faculty of Sports Sciences was established with the decision taken by the Council of Ministers on 16/2/2015 and education is currently being carried out with four departments and 265 students. There are Physical Education and Sports Teaching, Coaching, Sports Management, Recreation departments.

== See also ==
- List of universities in Turkey
