= Ufuk University =

Private university in Ankara, Turkey

- Ufuk Üniversitesi
- Type: Private
- Established: December 18th 1999
- Location: Ankara, Turkey
- Website: www.ufuk.edu.tr

Ufuk University (Turkish: Ufuk Üniversitesi) is a private university in Ankara, Turkey. The university was established by the Turkish Foundation of Traffic Accidents in 1999.

The university consists of Faculties of Medicine, Law, Education, Science-Literature (Statistics), Economics, Administrative and Social Sciences (Psychology, Management, Political Science and International Affairs, International Trade).

== See also ==
- List of universities in Turkey
