= Malatya Turgut Özal University =

Public university in Malatya, Turkey

- Type: Public
- Established: 2018
- Location: Malatya, Turkey; 38.47295°N 38.35224°E
- Website: https://www.ozal.edu.tr/

Malatya Turgut Özal University, shortened MTÜ, is a public university in Malatya, Turkey which was formed on 18 May 2018 by separation from Inönü University.

As of 2021, the university has 6 faculties, 2 colleges, 1 institute and 8 vocational schools.

== History ==
In 2018, some faculties which have been separated from Inönü University in accordance with the law no 7141 such as Faculty of Agriculture, Faculty of Engineering and Natural Sciences, Faculty of Business Administration and Management, Faculty of Design and Architecture, as well as Civil Aviation School, have become a part of newly established Malatya Turgut Özal University.

Malatya Turgut Özal University (MTÜ), one of the two universities in Malatya, was founded in memory of Turkey's 8th President, Turgut Özal, born in Malatya.

== Academics ==
=== Institutes ===
- Graduate School

=== Faculties ===
- Faculty of Engineering and Natural Sciences
- Faculty of Business Administration and Management
- Faculty of Design and Architecture
- Faculty of Agriculture
- Faculty of Health Sciences
- Faculty of Medicine

=== Colleges ===
- Civil Aviation School
- School of Foreign Languages

=== Vocational schools ===
- Akçadağ Vocational School
- Arapgir Vocational School
- Battalgazi Vocational School
- Doğanşehir Vahap Küçük Vocational School
- Darende Bekir Ilıcak Vocational School
- Kale Tourism and Hotel Management Vocational School
- Hekimhan Mehmet Emin Sungur Vocational School
- Yesilyurt Vocational School

== See also ==
- List of universities in Turkey
