= Çağ University =

Public university in Tarsus, Mersin, Turkey

- Çağ Üniversitesi
- Type: Private
- Established: July 9, 1997; 28 years ago
- Rector: Prof. Dr. Murat KOÇ
- Location: Yenice, Mersin Province, Turkey; 36.97695°N 35.07600°E
- Campus: Rural
- Website: www.cag.edu.tr/en/main.php

The Çağ University is a private non-profit university in Mersin Province, Turkey. It was established officially on 9 July 1997 by Bayboğan Education Foundation (Turkish: Bayboğan Eğitim Vakfı) in Mersin. "Çağ" means "epoch".

Situated on the state highway D.400 near Yenice, it is 22 km (14 mi) west of Adana, 18 km (11 mi) east of Tarsus and 45 km (28 mi) east of Mersin. The students are mostly from Mersin and Adana

Currently, there are three more universities in the Province of Mersin; Mersin University and Tarsus University are public universities and Toros University is another private university.

== Academic units ==
Presently the units of the university are as follows

- Faculty of Law
- Faculty of Arts and Sciences
- Faculty of Economic and Administrative Sciences

There is also a vocational school for 9 programs, an English preparatory school and an institute of Social sciences.
