= Kayseri University =

Public university in Kayseri, Turkey

- Kayseri Üniversitesi
- Motto: Öncü Üniversite
- Motto in English: Pioneer University
- Type: Public university
- Established: 18 May 2018; 8 years ago
- Rector: Prof. Dr. Kurtuluş Karamustafa
- Academic staff: 279
- Administrative staff: 373
- Students: 18,100
- Location: 15 Temmuz Main Campus, 38280 Talas, Kayseri; 38.71301°N 35.55376°E
- Website: www.kayseri.edu.tr

Kayseri University (Turkish Kayseri Üniversitesi), is a public university located in Kayseri, Turkey. It was founded on 18 May 2018 by the separation from Erciyes University. The main campus of Kayseri University, 15 Temmuz Campus, is located in Talas district. As of 2021, Kayseri University is one of three public university was established in Kayseri.

== Academic units ==
Kayseri University has 102 academic departments, most of which are organised into 6 faculties. These are responsible for the undergraduate programs.

=== Faculties ===
- Faculty of Engineering, Architecture and Design: Computer Engineering, Electrical-Electronics Engineering, Industrial Engineering, Industrial Product Design, Architecture, Engineering Fundamentals, Software Engineering
- Faculty of Applied Sciences: Gastronomy and Culinary Arts, Human Resources Management, Accounting and Financial Management, International Trade and Logistics, Management Information Systems
- Faculty of Islamic Sciences: Islamic Studies Program, Basic Islamic Sciences, Philosophy and Religious Studies, Islamic History and Arts
- Faculty of Social Sciences & Humanities: Health Management, History, Turkish Language and Literature
- Faculty of Health Sciences: Nutrition, Child Development, Nursing, Audiology
- Faculty of Computer and Information Sciences

=== Institute ===
- Institute of Graduate Studies: Electrical-Electronics Engineering, Computational Sciences and Engineering, Human Resources Management, Islamic History and Arts, Business Administration, Accounting and Financial Management, Organic Production, Health Management, History, Basic Islamic Sciences, International Trade and Logistics, Cybersecurity, Industrial Engineering, Philosophy and Religious Studies

=== Vocational schools ===
- Vocational School of Information Technologies
- Vocational School of Kayseri Organized Industrial Zone
- Vocational School of Technical Sciences
- Vocational School of Social Sciences
- Mustafa Çıkrıkçıoğlu Vocational School
- Safiye Çıkrıkçıoğlu Vocational School
- Develi Hüseyin Şahin Vocational School
- İncesu Ayşe-Saffet Aslan Vocational School
- Tomarza Mustafa Akıncıoğlu Vocational School
- Pınarbaşı Vocational School
- Bünyan Vocational School
- Yahyalı Vocational School
- Yeşilhisar Vocational School
- İncesu Vocational School

== International collaborations ==
Kayseri University has established a range of Erasmus Programme collaborations across various countries. In Italy, the university collaborates with Parthenope University of Naples and University of Sannio. In Estonia, Kayseri University has an agreement with Tallinn University of Applied Sciences. In Romania, partnerships include University of Oradea, King Michael I University of Life Sciences, Politehnica University of Bucharest, and University of Bucharest.

Poland is another key country with several collaborations, including Pope John Paul II State School of Higher Education, University of Szczecin, Uniwersytet Technologiczno-Humanistyczny im. Kazimierza Pulaskiego w Radomiu, and Uniwersytet Przyrodniczy w Lublinie. In Croatia, Kayseri University works with University of Osijek and State University of Tetova in North Macedonia.

In Germany, Kayseri University collaborates with Hochschule Schmalkalden and Fachhochschule Suedwestfalen. Lithuania's Siauliu Valstybine Kolegija is another partner institution. Kayseri University’s collaboration network extends to Bulgaria, with partnerships with Medical University Pleven, University of National and World Economy, and Technical University of Varna. In Portugal, it partners with Instituto Politécnico da Guarda. Finally, in the Czech Republic, Kayseri University collaborates with Tomas Bata University in Zlín.

== See also ==
- List of universities in Turkey
