= Sanko University =

Private university in Şehitkamil, Gaziantep, Turkey

- Motto: Serve to Humanity
- Type: Private
- Established: 18 June 2013; 13 years ago
- Rector: Güner Dağlı
- Location: Gaziantep, Turkey
- Website: www.sanko.edu.tr

Sanko University is a private university located in Şehitkâmil, Gaziantep, Turkey. Established on June 18, 2013, Sanko University was the first thematic university in Turkey to offer education in the fields of medicine and health sciences.

== Administration ==
Sanko is administrated by a Board of Trustees having eight members.

Sanko is a participant in the Erasmus exchange network and has strong academic affiliations with numerous universities abroad.

== Faculties and institutes ==
Sanko University is organised into three distinct faculties and two institutions which form the university's graduate school.

=== Faculties ===
School of Medicine

The Medical School is one of the initial three faculties at Sanko University, the establishment of which was approved on 18 June 2013. During the set-up process begun by the university board of trustees in December 2013, the deanship duties were carried out by the university's founding rector Prof. Dr. Ahmet SINAV until Prof. Dr. Salih Murat AKKIN, who was chosen from Istanbul University as founding dean according to article 40/B of the Higher Education Law, officially began his duties on 1 April 2014. The school's organization chart was approved by the Higher Education Board on 17 January 2014, and went into operation with a total of 40 departments: 13 in surgical medicine, 17 in internal medicine, and 10 in basic medical sciences; and 21 related disciplines. Permission to enroll students in the department was given by the Higher Education Board on 11 April 2014. 50 students gained entrance to the Medical School for the 2014–2015 academic year according to their results in the 2014 undergraduate placement exam. Five of these students attend on a full scholarship. Of the four foreign students who earned places in the department, two directly entered the first year, while two started in the Turkish language program. Thus 52 students began their first year studies in our Medical School in October 2014.

Faculty of Health Sciences
Faculty of Dentistry

=== Institutes ===
- Health Sciences Institute
- Graduate School of Sciences

== See also ==
- List of universities in Turkey
