= Afyon Kocatepe University =

Public university in Afyonkarahisar, Turkey

- Afyon Kocatepe Üniversitesi
- Established: 1992
- Location: Afyonkarahisar
- Website: aku.edu.tr

University rankings

Regional – Overall
- QS Emerging Europe and Central Asia: 301-350 (2022)

Afyon Kocatepe University is a state university in Afyonkarahisar, Turkey. It was established on July 3, 1992, with the transfer of various educational units of Anadolu University.

In the 2021-22 academic year, a total of 29992 students were studying as 9534 associate degree, 17458 undergraduate, 2533 graduate, and 467 doctoral students. As of 2022, a total of 1,047 academic staff, including 164 professors, 114 associate professors, 253 doctors, 310 lecturers, and 206 research assistants, were working within the university. As a result of the establishment of the health-themed Afyonkarahisar Health Sciences University in Afyonkarahisar, faculties and colleges providing health education were transferred to AFSU.

== Academic units ==
=== Faculties ===
- Faculty of Education
- Faculty of Fine Arts
- Faculty of Economic and Administrative Sciences
- Faculty of Technology
- Faculty of Veterinary
- Faculty of Engineering
- Faculty of Arts and Sciences
- Faculty of Law
- Faculty of Islamic Sciences
- Faculty of Tourism
- Faculty of Aeronautics and Astronautics
- Faculty of Sport Sciences
- Faculty of Applied Sciences

=== Institutes ===
- Institute of Science
- Institute of Health science
- Technological Research, Development, and training center

=== Vocational schools ===
- Afyonkarahisar Vocational School
- State Conservatory
- Physical Education and Sport Higher School

== Campuses ==
- Ahmet Necdet Sezer Campus
- Ali Çetinkaya Campus
- Ahmet Karahisari Campus
