= Ordu University =

Public university in Ordu, Turkey

Coordinates: 40.9762°N 37.9686°E

- Ordu Üniversitesi
- Type: Public
- Established: March 17, 2006; 20 years ago
- Location: Ordu
- Website: Official website

Ordu University (Turkish: Ordu Üniversitesi, ODU) is a public higher education established 2006 in Ordu, Turkey. Rector of the university is Prof. Dr. Orhan Baş.

There are over 17,000 students studying at Ordu University, as per estimates in university ranking frameworks.

== Affiliations ==
The university is a member of the Caucasus University Association.

== See also ==
- List of universities in Turkey
