= Kyrgyz-Turkish Manas University =

Kyrgyz-Turkish university located in Bishkek, Kyrgyzstan

Coordinates: 42.8348°N 74.5753°E

Manas University
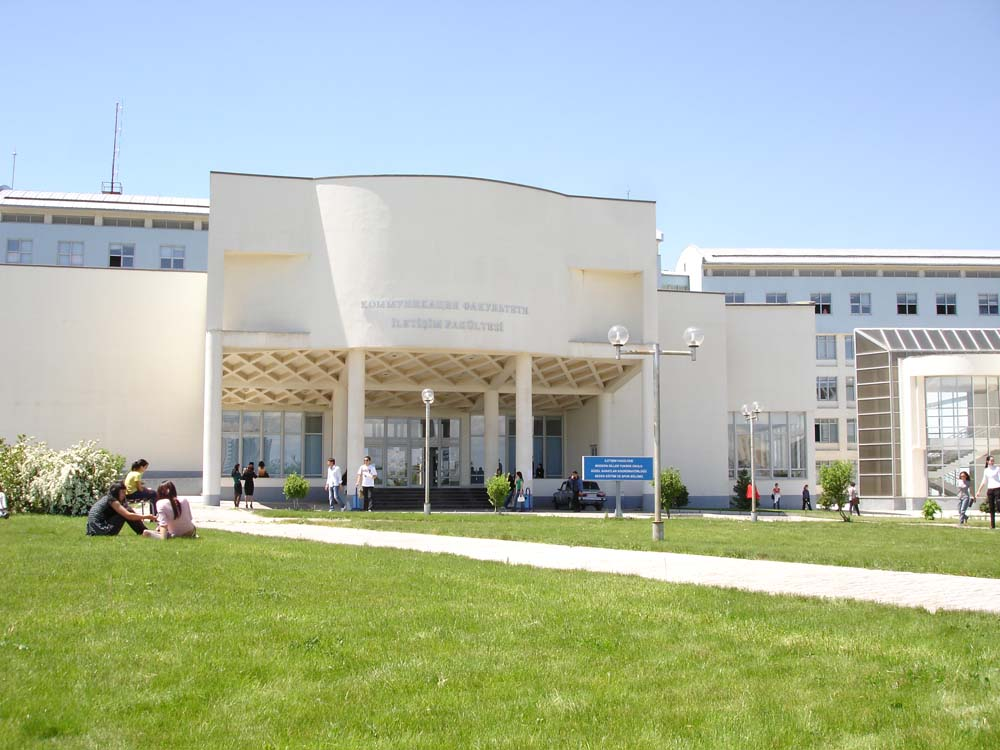
- Motto: "More Than Just a University"(Turkish: "Bir Üniversiteden Ötesi...")
- Type: Public university
- Established: 1995
- President: Prof. Dr. Alpaslan Ceylan; Prof. Dr. A. Ibraev
- Faculty: 338
- Administrative staff: 314
- Students: 4773 (2023; all campuses)
- Undergraduates: 3996
- Postgraduates: 380
- Location: Bishkek, Kyrgyzstan
- Campus: Djal (500 acres/2.00km² Cyngyz Aitmatov Campus) 456 acres (1.85 km^{2})
- Colors: Red, White, Yellow, Blue
- Website: www.manas.edu.kg

University rankings

Global – Overall
- QS World: 901-950 (2025)

Regional – Overall
- QS Asia: =230 (2025)
- QS Emerging Europe and Central Asia: 156 (2022)

Kyrgyz-Turkish Manas University (KTMU) is a public university in Bishkek, founded according to an agreement between the governments of the Republic of Turkey and the Kyrgyz Republic, which was signed in Izmir on September 30, 1995. The university began operation in the 1997-1998 academic year.

To be accepted to the university, students from the Kyrgyz Republic must pass a university entrance examination, while students from Turkey are accepted according to their score on the Student Selection and Placement Center examination (TCS), as do other students from Turkic peoples and related communities.

According to the Spring semester of the 2023-2024 academic year, there are 4393 undergraduate and associate degree students studying in 12 faculties and 1 high school of vocational education. Additionally, 380 students are studying in post-graduate institute.

According to the Council of Higher Education of Turkey, the university has the same status as other universities in Turkey. Tuition at the university is free; students are provided with an Academic Achievement Scholarship. Textbooks are supplied. The educational scholarship is given by the Republic of Turkey. Students are provided with affordable lunches and can apply for accommodation in the dorms.

The languages of instruction at the university are Turkish and Kyrgyz as well as English and Russian.

Manas University is represented by a multicultural environment with students from 14 countries and regions. Alongside classes, there is a range of sports teams, clubs, and campus events including contests, festivals, career days, and tournaments.

To supplement learning, KTMU provides internship opportunities for students at the Central Bank of Turkey, the Istanbul Stock Exchange (ISE), Turkey Radio and Television Corporation (TRT), Turkey Union of Chambers and Commodity Exchanges (TOBB), Turkish Ziraat Bank and other institutions. Students may also participate in exchange programs through Mevlana, ERASMUS PLUS, Orhun Exchange, Open World, and US Central Asian Education Foundation.

== Housing ==
Manas University provides students with several housing options. There are two dorm buildings housing a total of 1156 students, and one subdivided apartment building housing a total of 298 students.

== Rankings ==
Manas University was ranked 190th among 449 universities of countries from the emerging Europe and Central Asia region in Quacquarelli Symonds EECA University Rankings of 2022.

The QS World University Rankings ranked Manas University 230th in Asia in 2025.
