= Kahramanmaraş İstiklal University =

Public university in Kahramanmaraş, Turkey

Coordinates: 37.5734°N 36.9337°E

- Kahramanmaraş İstiklal Üniversitesi
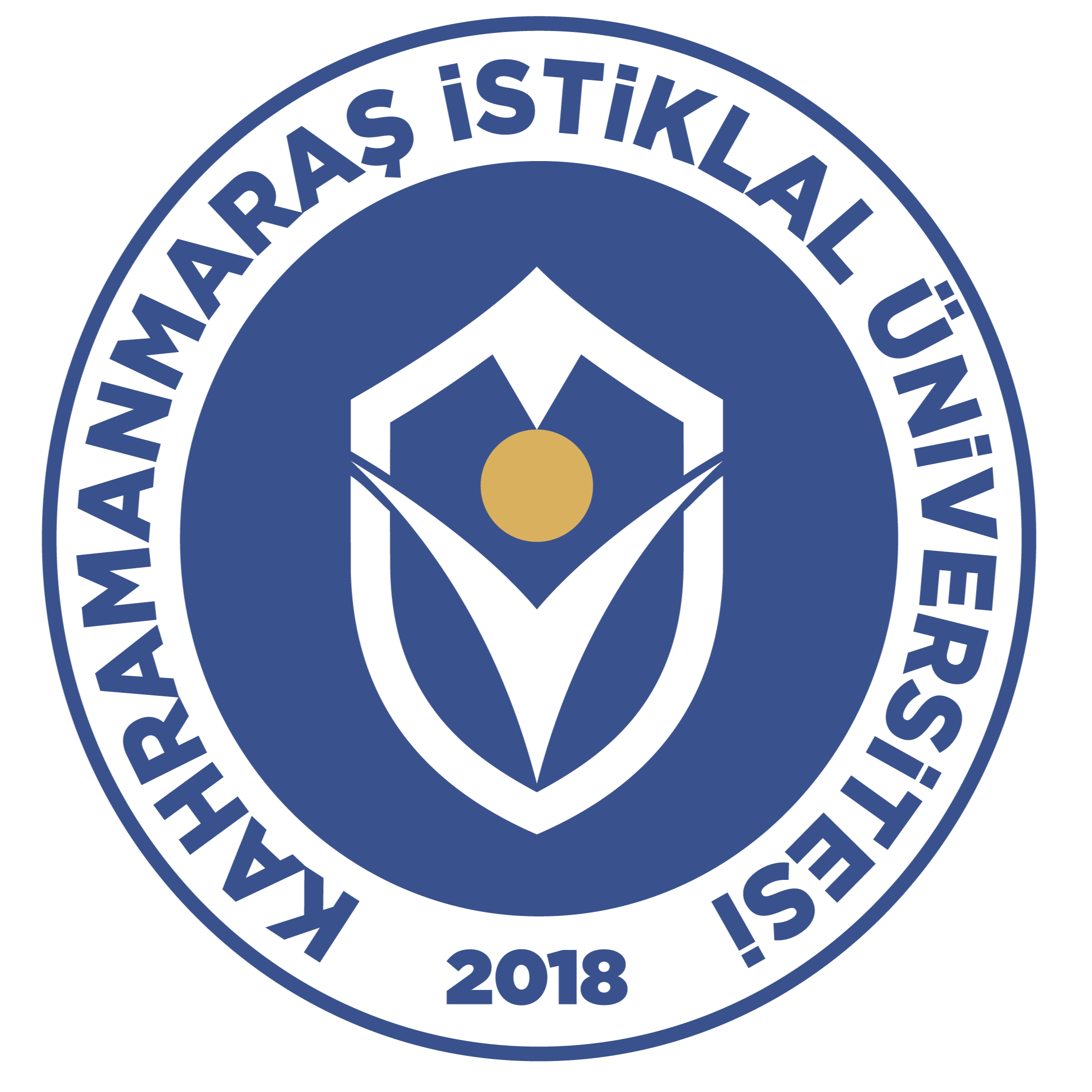
- Established: 2018
- Rector: İsmail Bakan
- Location: Kahramanmaraş, Turkey
- Website: www.istiklal.edu.tr

Kahramanmaraş İstiklal University (Turkish: Kahramanmaraş İstiklal Üniversitesi) is a public university in Kahramanmaraş, Turkey. It was established on 18 May 2018.

== Academic units ==
=== Faculties ===
- Elbistan Faculty of Engineering
- Faculty of Communication
- Faculty of Humanities and Social Sciences
- Faculty of Islamic Sciences
- Faculty of Engineering, Architecture, and Design
- Faculty of Health Sciences
- Faculty of Tourism

=== Vocational Schools ===
- Elbistan Vocational School
- Elbistan Vocational School of Health Services
- Türkoğlu Vocational School
- Airbus-TUSAŞ Aviation Vocational School
