= Avrasya University =

Private university in Trabzon, Turkey

- Avrasya Üniversitesi
- University logo
- Type: Private university
- Established: November 25, 2010
- Founders: Maçka İmar, Eğitim, Kültür ve Sosyal Hizmet Vakfı
- Vice-Chancellor: Prof. Dr. Yavuz Özoran; Prof. Dr. Aytap Sezer
- Rector: Prof. Dr. Gülay Yeginoğlu
- Students: 5,077 (2021–22)
- Undergraduates: 2,488 (2021–22)
- Postgraduates: 245 (2021–22)
- Doctoral students: 28 (2021–22)
- Location: Trabzon, Turkey
- Website: avrasya.edu.tr

Avrasya University (Turkish: Avrasya Üniversitesi) is a foundation (private) university located in Trabzon, Turkey. It was established on November 25, 2010, by the Maçka İmar, Eğitim, Kültür ve Sosyal Hizmet Vakfı (Maçka Urban Planning, Education, Culture and Social Services Foundation) and began academic activities in the 2011–2012 academic year.

== History ==
The university was established following approval by the Turkish Grand National Assembly, gaining legal entity with the publication of the law in the Official Gazette on January 28, 2011. Academic operations began with the Faculties of Engineering and Architecture, Economics and Administrative Sciences, Arts and Sciences, and the Vocational School. New faculties and graduate institutes were later added, with the three original graduate institutes merged as the Graduate Education Institute in 2020–2021. In 2021, the Faculty of Communication was established.

== Academic units ==
=== Faculties ===
- Faculty of Engineering and Architecture
- Faculty of Arts and Sciences
- Faculty of Economics and Administrative Sciences
- Faculty of Health Sciences
- Faculty of Communication

=== Schools ===
- School of Applied Sciences
- School of Tourism and Hotel Management
- Vocational School of Health Services
- Vocational School

=== Institutes ===
- Graduate Education Institute

== Campuses ==
The university operates four campuses in Trabzon:

- Pelitli Campus
- Yomra Campus
- Ömer Yıldız Campus
- Kaşüstü Campus
