= Nuh Naci Yazgan University =

Private university in Kayseri, Turkey

- Nuh Naci Yazgan Üniversitesi
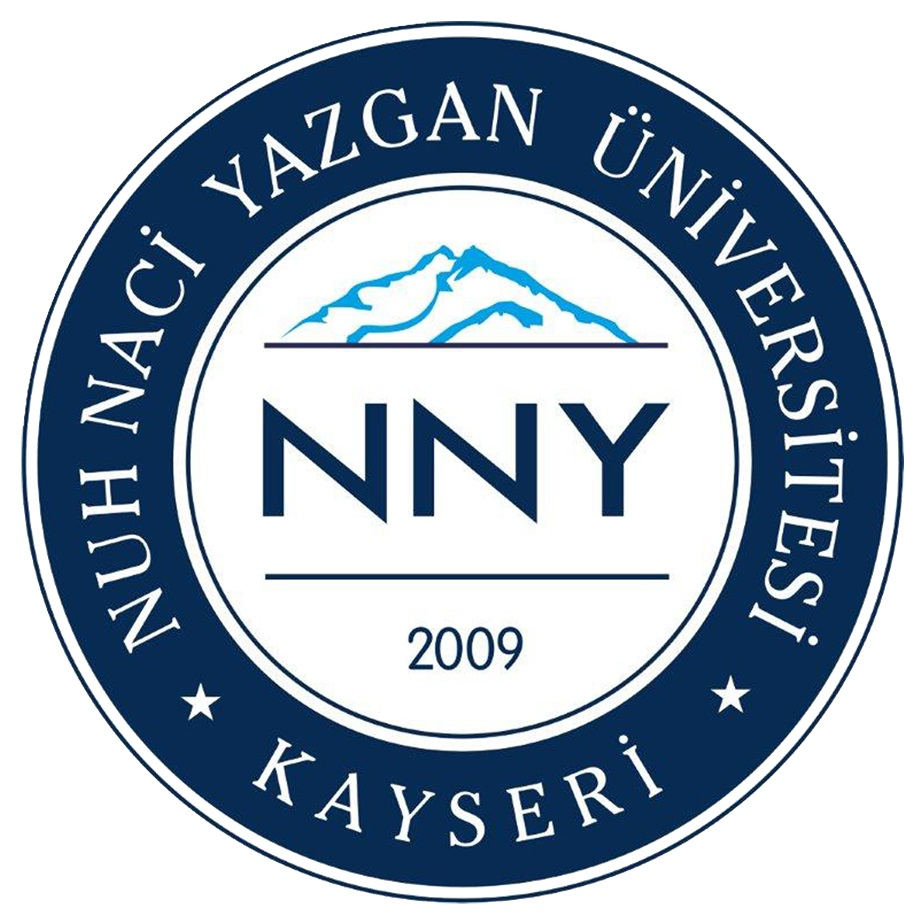
- Type: Private university
- Established: 23 June 2009; 17 years ago
- Rector: Prof. Dr. Ahmet Fazıl Özsoylu
- Students: 2,543
- Location: Kayseri, Turkey; 38.786373°N 35.406928°E
- Campus: Rural
- Language: Turkish, English
- Website: Official website

Nuh Naci Yazgan University (Turkish:Nuh Naci Yazgan Üniversitesi) is a private university located in Kayseri, Turkey. It was established in 2009.

Nuh Naci Yazgan University was established by the Kayseri Higher Education and Assistance Foundation. The foundation's origins trace back to the Kayseri Education and Cooperation Association, which aimed to provide financial and moral support to students from Kayseri pursuing higher education in universities located in Ankara and Istanbul.

== History ==
During the 1972 annual meeting of the association, it was decided to establish a foundation dedicated to bringing a university to Kayseri. Under the leadership of Prof. Dr. Necmettin Feyzioğlu, a commission was formed to oversee this initiative. Through their diligent efforts, the Kayseri Higher Education and Assistance Foundation was officially established on May 29, 1975, by a ruling of the Kayseri Civil Court. The foundation was founded by 63 individuals, including one legal entity, the Kayseri Education and Cooperation Association, residing in Istanbul and Kayseri.

The foundation, which was granted tax exemption by a Cabinet decision, comprises academics, bureaucrats, and business professionals as its founders. Its headquarters are located in Kayseri, with branches in Ankara and Istanbul. The foundation currently has 65 founding members and 258 honorary members. Nuh Naci Yazgan University was established in 2009 by the Kayseri Higher Education and Assistance Foundation.

The university was named after Nuh Naci Yazgan, a prominent businessman known for his contributions to Turkey's industrial development. In 1927, he, along with fellow entrepreneurs Mustafa Özgür, Nuri Has, and Seyit Tekin, purchased and operated Millî Mensucat, one of the country's oldest factories, from the Treasury. Established as the seventh textile factory in Turkey and the first in Adana, Millî Mensucat holds a significant place in the nation's industrial history.

== Departments ==
=== Faculties and departments ===
NNYU has 15 academic departments, most of which are organised into 7 faculties.

- Faculty of Health Sciences: Nutrition and Dietetics, Nursing, Physiotherapy and Rehabilitation
- Faculty of Engineering: Electrical and Electronics Engineering, Civil Engineering, Industrial Engineering
- Faculty of Administrative Sciences: Business Administration, Economics, Political Science and Public Administration
- Faculty of Architecture: Architecture, Interior Architecture and Environmental Design
- Faculty of Arts & Sciences: Psychology
- Faculty of Law
- Faculty of Dental Medicine

=== Graduate Schools ===
- Institute of Natural Sciences: OHS, Electrical and Electronics Engineering, Civil Engineering, Industrial Engineering
- Institute of Social Sciences: Master of Business Administration, Economics
- Institute of Health Sciences: Nutrition and Dietetics, Physiotherapy and Rehabilitation

== International collaborations ==
NNY has established Erasmus Programme agreements with a wide range of international institutions. These include West University of Timișoara in Romania, Powiślański College of Kwidzyn in Poland, University of Pécs in Hungary, Medical University Pleven in Bulgaria, and Radom Academy of Economics in Poland. Other notable agreements are with Aristotle University of Thessaloniki in Greece, Angel Kanchev University of Ruse in Bulgaria, Danubius University of Galați in Romania, and University of Defence in Brno in the Czech Republic. Additionally, NNY has partnerships with Fontys University of Applied Sciences in the Netherlands, University of Warmia and Mazury in Olsztyn in Poland, BKF University of Applied Sciences in Budapest in Hungary, and University of Gdańsk in Poland. The university also collaborates with University of Foggia in Italy, Ovidius University of Constanța in Romania, Medical University in Sofia in Bulgaria, Tallinna Tervishoiu Kõrgkool in Estonia, and State University of Tetova in Macedonia. Furthermore, NNY has agreements with Università Degli Studi Della Campania Luigi Vanvitelli in Naples in Italy, Universitatea Politehnica din București and Transilvania University of Brașov in Romania.
