= Afyonkarahisar Health Sciences University =

Public university in Turkey

Coordinates: 38.784°N 30.467°E

- Afyonkarahisar Sağlık Bilimleri Üniversitesi
- Motto: Sağlığın Üniversitesi
- Motto in English: University of Health
- Type: Public university
- Established: 18 May 2018
- Vice-Chancellor: Ümit Dündar; İbrahim Keleş; Ahmet Ali Tuncer
- Rector: Adem Aslan
- Academic staff: 579 (2025)
- Students: 6908 (September 2026)
- Undergraduates: 6676 (September 2026)
- Postgraduates: 232 (September 2026)
- Doctoral students: 9 (September 2026)
- Location: Zafer Sağlık Külliyesi Dörtyol Mah. 2078. Sokak No:3 Afyonkarahisar, Afyonkarahisar, Turkey
- Campus: Zafer Health Complex
- Website: www.afsu.edu.tr

Afyonkarahisar Health Sciences University (Turkish: Afyonkarahisar Sağlık Bilimleri Üniversitesi, AFSÜ) is a public university in Afyonkarahisar, Turkey. It was established in 2018.

== History ==
The B Block building, currently occupied by the Faculty of Medicine

The campus of the current university was initially planned to serve a vocational training programme for marble cutting. The foundations of the campus buildings were laid in 1988 and opened in September 1992 as the Ali Çetinkaya Campus (Ali Çetinkaya Kampüsü, AÇK) as a part of the Afyon Kocatepe University. The university itself was established on 3 July 1992. Many new faculties were established on the campus, however as new health-related facilities were established other faculties were gradually moved to the Ahmet Necdet Sezer Campus (Ahmet Necdet Sezer Kampüsü, ANS) on the D 665 highway, which later became the main campus of Kocatepe University after separation.

The Faculty of Medicine was established on 26 March 1998 and started admitting students in 2002.

The current university was established on 18 May 2018 by merging health-related faculties and vocational schools that were formerly part of Afyon Kocatepe University, and a new institute.

== Campus ==
The university's only campus, Zafer Health Complex (Zafer Sağlık Külliyesi), is located next to D.300 state highway, comprising 48,2 hectares. The university hospital is located in this campus, which has a capacity of 665 beds.

A guest house was opened in the campus in 2021. There is also a branch of Vakıfbank and a mosque inside the campus.

There also are two vocational colleges in Bolvadin and Şuhut, respectively.

== Academics ==
The university has four faculties: medicine, dentistry, pharmacy and health sciences. It also has three vocational colleges and a postgraduate institute.
