= Tarsus University =

Public university in Tarsus, Mersin, Turkey

Coordinates: 39.81590°N 34.8384°E

- Type: Public
- Established: 2018; 8 years ago
- Location: Tarsus, Mersin
- Website: Official website

Tarsus University is a public university in Mersin Province, Turkey. It was established on 18 May 2018 as a separate university in Tarsus district with academic units affiliated to Mersin University and new academic units. Tarsus University provides education in 1 institute, 7 faculties and 3 vocational schools.

== History ==
The origins of Tarsus University date back to 1992 with its academic units affiliated with Mersin University. It was founded with the Law No. 7141 published in the Official Gazette of the Republic of Turkey numbered 30425 on 18 May 2018.

== Academics ==
=== Institutes ===
- Institute of Graduate Studies

=== Faculties ===
- Faculty of Aeronautics and Astronautics
- Faculty of Economics and Administrative Sciences
- Faculty of Humanities and Social Sciences
- Faculty of Engineering
- Faculty of Health Sciences
- Faculty of Technology
- Faculty of Applied Sciences

=== Vocational schools ===
- Tarsus University Vocational School
- Tarsus University Vocational School of Health Services
- Tarsus OSB Technical Sciences Vocational School
