= Council of Higher Education (Turkey) =

State institution in Turkey

- Yükseköğretim Kurulu

Agency overview
- Formed: 6 November 1981
- Type: Education
- Jurisdiction: Turkey
- Headquarters: Çankaya, Ankara
- Annual budget: ₺95.630.000
- Website: yok.gov.tr

The Council of Higher Education (Turkish: Yükseköğretim Kurulu, YÖK; also translated as the Higher Education Board), established with the Higher Education Law numbered 2547 (Turkish: 2547 sayılı Yükseköğretim Kanunu) which became effective on 6 November 1981, is responsible for the supervision of the universities in Turkey, in a capacity defined by Article 130 of the Turkish Constitution of 1982. The current president of the council is Erol Özvar, a former professor at Marmara University in Istanbul, who was appointed by President Recep Tayyip Erdoğan.

== Organisation ==
Of the 24 members, seven are nominated by the President of Turkey, seven by the Inter University Council, seven by the Council of Ministers, one by the Armed Forces, and two by the Ministry of Education. All nominations have to be confirmed by the President of Turkey. The main task of the YÖK is to receive the proposed budgets of the universities and to submit a list of nominees for the appointment of a University Rector to the President of Turkey. The YÖK also receives reports from the Universities about their performance and statistics.

A Higher Educational Supervisory Council supervises the universities and consists of ten members. Of the five members from the YÖK, one is appointed by the Ministry of Education, one by the Armed Forces, one by the Supreme Court, one by the State Accounting Bureau, and one by the Council of State.

== History ==
The YÖK was founded in the immediate aftermath of the 12 September 1980 coup d'état, which established military rule. It reorganised education along strict military lines and throughout the 1980s, professors were encouraged to instill the values of family, nationalism and 'Turkishness' in the students, who were urged to put patriotic duties and responsibilities into practice.

The autonomy of Turkish universities, granted with Article 120 of the Turkish Constitution of 1961, was not included in the text of the Turkish Constitution of 1982. In practice, the autonomy of Turkish universities was de facto suspended in 1971 and de jure ended with the Higher Education Law numbered 2547 (Turkish: 2547 sayılı Yükseköğretim Kanunu) which became effective on 6 November 1981.

In 1992, the YÖK established a scholarship program to be able to assign qualified professors to the 24 newly established universities outside of Ankara, Istanbul and Izmir. It selected students to study abroad, who, in exchange, would teach at Turkish universities for a period equal to double the amount of years that their studies abroad were supported. The program was initiated by Mehmet Sağlam, the president of the YÖK at the time.

== See also ==
- Turkish Academy of Sciences (TÜBA)
- Scientific and Technological Research Council of Turkey (TÜBİTAK)
