= List of medical schools in Europe =

The following is a list of medical schools (or universities with a medical school) in Europe.

== Armenia ==
- Yerevan State Medical University
- University of Traditional Medicine
- Progress University of Gyumri-Faculty of Medicine
- St. Theresa's Medical University of Yerevan

== Albania ==
Public

- University of Medicine, Tirana – Faculty of Medicine

Private

- Catholic University "Our Lady of Good Counsel" - Faculty of Medicine

== Austria ==
- Medical University of Innsbruck
- Karl Landsteiner University of Health Sciences
- The Faculty of Medicine at the Johannes Kepler University Linz
- Medical University of Graz
- Medical University of Vienna
- Paracelsus Medical University, Salzburg and Nuremberg

== Azerbaijan ==
- Azerbaijan Medical University
- Nakhchivan State University

== Belarus ==
- Belarusian State Medical University, Minsk (Belarusian: Беларускі дзяржаўны медыцынскі ўніверсітэт)
- Gomel State Medical University (Belarusian: Гомельскі дзяржаўны медыцынскі ўніверсітэт)
- Grodno State Medical University (Belarusian: Гродненскі дзяржаўны медыцынскі ўніверсітэт)
- Vitebsk State Order of Peoples' Friendship Medical University (Belarusian: Віцебскі дзяржаўны медыцынскі ўніверсітэт)

== Belgium ==
In order of creation

- Faculty of Medicine and Dental Sciences, Université catholique de Louvain – Brussels (1425)
- Faculty of Medicine, Katholieke Universiteit Leuven – Leuven (1425)
- Faculty of Medicine, University of Liège – Liège (1817)
- Faculty of Medicine and Rehabilitation Sciences, Ghent University – Ghent (1817)
- Faculty of Medicine, University of Namur – Namur (1831)
- Faculty of Medicine, Université libre de Bruxelles – Brussels (1834)
- Faculty of Medicine and Pharmacy, Vrije Universiteit Brussel – Brussels (1834)
- Faculty of Medicine and Health Sciences, University of Antwerp – Antwerp (1972)
- Faculty of Medicine and Life Sciences, Hasselt University – Hasselt (1971)
- Faculty of Medicine and Pharmacy, University of Mons – Mons (2009)

== Bosnia and Herzegovina ==
- Faculty of Medicine, University of Banja Luka
- Faculty of Medicine, University of East Sarajevo
- Faculty of Medicine, University of Mostar
- Faculty of Medicine, University of Sarajevo, taught also in English (public)
- Faculty of Medicine, University of Tuzla
- Sarajevo Medical School, taught in English (private)
- International University of Goražde, taught in English (private)
- International University of Sarajevo, taught in English (private)
  - University of Health Sciences (Turkey), Sarajevo International Medical School

== Bulgaria ==
- Medical University Pleven – Faculty of Medicine
- Medical University of Plovdiv
- Medical University of Sofia – Faculty of Medicine
- Medical University of Varna – Faculty of Medicine
- Sofia University – Faculty of Medicine
- Trakia University of Stara Zagora – Faculty of Medicine

== Croatia ==
- School of Medicine, University of Zagreb
- School of Medicine, University of Rijeka
- School of Medicine, University of Split
- School of Medicine, University of Osijek
- School of Medicine, Juraj Dobrila University of Pula

== Cyprus ==
- Medical School, University of Cyprus
- Saint George's Medical School in Cyprus
- School of Medicine, European University Cyprus
- University of Nicosia Medical School

== Czech Republic ==
- Charles University has three faculties in Prague and two outside:
  - Charles University in Prague, First Faculty of Medicine
  - Charles University in Prague, Second Faculty of Medicine
  - Charles University in Prague, Third Faculty of Medicine
  - Charles University, Faculty of Medicine in Hradec Králové
  - Charles University, Faculty of Medicine in Pilsen
- University of Defence, Faculty of Military Health Sciences
- Masaryk University, Faculty of Medicine
- Palacký University Olomouc, Faculty of Medicine and Dentistry
- University of Ostrava, Faculty of Medicine

== Denmark ==
- Aalborg University, Faculty of Health Sciences
- Aarhus University, Health
- University of Copenhagen Faculty of Health and Medical Sciences
- University of Southern Denmark, Faculty of Health Sciences, Odense

== Estonia ==
- University of Tartu, Faculty of Medicine

== Finland ==
- University of Helsinki – Faculty of Medicine
- University of Oulu – Faculty of Medicine
- Tampere University – Faculty of Medicine
- University of Turku – Faculty of Medicine
- University of Eastern Finland – Faculty of Medicine

== France ==
Many French universities have a medical school, called UFR de Médecine, where UFR stands for Unité de Formation et de Recherche, or "Unit for training and research" in English.

- Aix-Marseille University
- University of Angers
- University of Bordeaux
- University of Burgundy
- University of Western Brittany
- University of Caen Normandy
- Clermont Auvergne University
- University of Franche-Comté
- Grenoble Alpes University
- University of Lille
- Université catholique de Lille
- University of Limoges
- Claude Bernard University Lyon 1 (two UFRs of medicine, Lyon Est and Lyon Sud)
- Jean Monnet University (Saint-Étienne)
- University of Montpellier
- University of Lorraine
- University of Nantes
- Côte d'Azur University
- Paris-Saclay Medical School (Paris-Saclay University)
- Université Paris Cité
- Sorbonne University
- Paris-East Créteil University (Paris 12)
- Sorbonne Paris North University (Paris 13)
- University of Picardy Jules Verne
- University of Poitiers
- University of Reims Champagne-Ardenne
- University of Rennes
- University of Rouen Normandy
- University of Strasbourg
- Paul Sabatier University (Toulouse III)
- University of Tours
- University of Versailles Saint-Quentin-en-Yvelines

== Georgia ==
- BAU International University, Batumi
- David Tvildiani Medical University, Tbilisi
- Tbilisi State Medical University, Georgia
- Petre Shotadze Tbilisi Medical Academy
- New Vision University, Tbilisi, Georgia
- Akaki Tsereteli State university, Kutaisi, Georgia
- Ivane Javakhishvili Tbilisi State University, Georgia
- David Aghmashenebeli University of Georgia, Tbilisi, Georgia
- European University Faculty of Medicine
- Georgian American University Tbilisi, Georgia
- Tbilisi Open Teaching University, Tbilisi, Georgia
- University of Georgia, Tbilisi, Georgia

== Germany ==
=== Baden-Württemberg ===
- Faculty of Medicine, University of Freiburg
- School of Medicine, Heidelberg University
- Faculty of Medicine in Mannheim, Heidelberg University
- University of Tübingen
- University of Ulm

=== Bavaria ===
- University of Erlangen–Nuremberg
- LMU Klinikum of LMU Munich
- TUM School of Medicine and Health of Technical University of Munich
- University of Regensburg
- University of Würzburg

=== Berlin ===
- Charité – University Medicine Berlin of Free University of Berlin and the Humboldt University of Berlin

=== Hamburg ===
- University of Hamburg (University Medical Center Hamburg-Eppendorf)
- UMCH (UMCH - Universitätsmedizin Neumarkt a. M. Campus Hamburg)

=== Hessen ===
- Goethe University Frankfurt
- University of Giessen
- Marburg University

=== Mecklenburg-Vorpommern ===
- Faculty of Medicine, University of Greifswald
- Medizinische Fakultät, University of Rostock, Rostock

=== North Rhine-Westphalia ===
- RWTH Aachen University
- University Hospitals of the Ruhr University Bochum
- University of Bonn
- University of Cologne
- Heinrich Heine University Düsseldorf
- University of Duisburg-Essen, Essen
- University of Münster
- Witten/Herdecke University

=== Lower Saxony ===
- University of Göttingen
- Hannover Medical School (MHH)
- University of Oldenburg, European Medical School

=== Rhineland-Palatinate ===
- University of Mainz

=== Saarland ===
- Saarland University, Saarbrücken/Campus Homburg

=== Saxony-Anhalt ===
- Otto von Guericke University Magdeburg
- Martin Luther University Halle-Wittenberg

=== Saxony ===
- TU Dresden
- Leipzig University

=== Schleswig-Holstein ===
- Kiel University
- University of Lübeck

=== Thuringia ===
- University of Jena

=== Private ===
- Asklepios Medical School
- University Targu Mures Medical Campus Hamburg (medical faculty of the University of Medicine, Pharmacy, Science and Technology of Târgu Mureș)
- MSH Medical School Hamburg
- MSB Medical School Berlin
- Brandenburg Medical School Theodor Fontane
- HMU Health and Medical University

== Greece ==
- University of Athens
- University of Crete
- University of Ioannina
- University of Patras
- University of Thessaloniki
- University of Thessaly
- University of Thrace

== Hungary ==
- University of Szeged medical school
- Semmelweis University medical school
- University of Debrecen medical school
- University of Pécs medical school

== Iceland ==
- University of Iceland

== Ireland ==
- University of Galway
- Royal College of Surgeons in Ireland
- Trinity College Dublin
- University College Cork
- University College Dublin
- University of Limerick

== Italy ==
=== Public ===
==== Abruzzo ====
- D'Annunzio University of Chieti–Pescara (Chieti)
- University of L'Aquila (L'Aquila)

==== Apulia ====
- University of Bari (Bari and Taranto)
- University of Foggia
- University of Salento

==== Calabria ====
- Magna Græcia University

==== Campania ====
- University of Naples Federico II
- Università degli Studi della Campania Luigi Vanvitelli (Caserta and Naples)
- University of Salerno (Baronissi)

==== Emilia-Romagna ====
- University of Bologna (Bologna, Forlì, Ravenna)
- University of Ferrara
- University of Modena and Reggio Emilia (Modena)
- University of Parma

==== Friuli-Venezia Giulia ====
- University of Trieste
- University of Udine

==== Lazio ====
- Sapienza University of Rome (Rome)
- University of Rome Tor Vergata

==== Liguria ====
- University of Genoa

==== Lombardy ====
- University of Milan
- University of Milano-Bicocca
- University of Insubria (Como and Varese)
- University of Pavia
- University of Brescia

==== Marche ====
- Marche Polytechnic University (Ancona)

==== Molise ====
- University of Molise (Campobasso)

==== Piedmont ====
- University of Eastern Piedmont (Alessandria and Novara)
- University of Turin (Turin)

==== Sardinia ====
- University of Cagliari
- University of Sassari

==== Sicily ====
- University of Catania
- University of Messina
- University of Palermo (Palermo)

==== Trentino Alto Adige ====
- University of Trento

==== Tuscany ====
- University of Florence
- University of Pisa
- University of Siena

==== Umbria ====
- University of Perugia (Perugia and Terni)

==== Veneto ====
- University of Padua (Padua and Treviso)
- University of Verona

=== Private ===
==== Lazio ====
- Universita Cattolica del Sacro Cuore, Rome (Catholic)
- Università Campus Bio-Medico, Rome (Catholic)
- Saint Camillus International University of Health and Medical Sciences, Rome

==== Lombardy ====
- Humanitas University, Pieve Emanuele
- Vita-Salute San Raffaele University, Milan (Catholic)

==== Sicily ====
- Kore University of Enna, Enna

== Kosovo ==
Note: (Note: Country with limited recognition.)

Public

- University of Pristina - Faculty of Medicine (Universiteti i Prishtines – Fakulteti i Mjekesise)

== Latvia ==
- Riga Stradiņš University
- University of Latvia

== Lithuania ==
- Lithuanian University of Health Sciences
- Vilnius University – Faculty of Medicine

== North Macedonia ==
- St. Cyril and Methodius University – Skopje, Faculty of Medicine
- Goce Delčev University of Štip – Faculty for Medical Sciences
- State University of Tetovo - Faculty of Medical Sciences | (Universiteti Shteteror i Tetoves; Univerzitet vo Tetovo)

== Malta ==
- Queen Mary University of London Malta Campus
- University of Malta, Faculty of Medicine & Surgery

== Moldova ==
- Nicolae Testemițanu State University of Medicine and Pharmacy

== Montenegro ==
- University of Montenegro – Faculty of Medicine

== Netherlands ==
- Universiteit van Amsterdam, Faculty of Medicine / Amsterdam University Medical Center
- Vrije Universiteit Amsterdam, Faculty of Medicine / VU University Medical Center
- University of Groningen, Faculty of Medicine / University Medical Center Groningen
- Leiden University, Faculty of Medicine / Leiden University Medical Center
- Universiteit Maastricht, Faculty of Health, Medicine and Life Sciences / Maastricht UMC+
- Radboud University Nijmegen, Faculty of Medicine / Radboud University Medical Center
- Erasmus University Rotterdam, Faculty of Medicine / Erasmus University Medical Center
- Utrecht University, Faculty of Medicine / University Medical Center Utrecht

== Northern Cyprus ==
Note: (Note: Country with limited recognition.)

- Eastern Mediterranean University, Faculty of Medicine
- Girne University, Faculty of Medicine
- Near East University, Faculty of Medicine

== Norway ==
- Norwegian University of Science and Technology, Faculty of Medicine (in Trondheim)
- University of Bergen
- University of Oslo, Faculty of Medicine
  - The National Hospital (Rikshospitalet)
  - University Hospital, includes Gaustad Hospital, Norway's oldest psychiatric hospital
- University of Tromsø - The Arctic University of Norway
  - The first four pre-clinical years at the University of Tromsø
  - The last two clinical years may be finished at either University Hospital of Northern Norway Tromsø (UNN Tromsø), Nordland Hospital Bodø or Finnmark Hospital Hammerfest.

== Poland ==
Medical schools admitted to the Conference of Rectors of Academic Medical Universities (KRAUM) ― all of them have obtained the mandatory authorization of the Ministry of Science and Higher Education (MNiSW), the mandatory accreditation of the Polish Accreditation Committee (PKA), the voluntary quality certificate of the University Commission for the Quality in Medical Education (UKJKKL) and the registration in the World Directory of Medical Schools (WDOMS):

- Collegium Medicum of the Jagiellonian University in Kraków (Collegium Medicum Uniwersytetu Jagiellońskiego)
- Ludwik Rydygier Collegium Medicum in Bydgoszcz of the Nicolaus Copernicus University in Toruń (Collegium Medicum im. Ludwika Rydygiera w Bydgoszczy Uniwersytetu Mikołaja Kopernika w Toruniu)
- Collegium Medicum of the University of Warmia and Mazury in Olsztyn (Collegium Medicum Uniwersytetu Warmińsko-Mazurskiego w Olsztynie)
- Collegium Medicum of the University of Rzeszów (Collegium Medicum Uniwersytetu Rzeszowskiego)
- Collegium Medicum of the University of Zielona Góra (Collegium Medicum Uniwersytetu Zielonogórskiego)
- Collegium Medicum of the Jan Kochanowski University in Kielce (Collegium Medicum Uniwersytetu Jana Kochanowskiego w Kielcach)
- Medical University of Białystok (Uniwersytet Medyczny w Białymstoku)
- Medical University of Gdańsk (Gdański Uniwersytet Medyczny)
- Medical University of Silesia (Śląski Uniwersytet Medyczny), comprising medical schools in Katowice and Zabrze
- Medical University of Lublin (Uniwersytet Medyczny w Lublinie)
- Medical University of Łódź (Uniwersytet Medyczny w Łodzi)
- Poznań University of Medical Sciences (Uniwersytet Medyczny im. Karola Marcinkowskiego w Poznaniu)
- Pomeranian Medical University in Szczecin (Pomorski Uniwersytet Medyczny w Szczecinie)
- Medical University of Warsaw (Warszawski Uniwersytet Medyczny)
- Wrocław Medical University (Uniwersytet Medyczny im. Piastów Śląskich we Wrocławiu)

Other medical schools, established from 2017 onwards ― all of them have obtained the mandatory authorization of the Ministry of Science and Higher Education, although some have failed to obtain the mandatory accreditation of the Polish Accreditation Committee (thus being at risk of their authorization being revoked) and/or the registration in the World Directory of Medical Schools, while none of them has obtained the voluntary quality certificate of the University Commission for the Quality in Medical Education:

- Collegium Medicum of the WSB University in Dąbrowa Górnicza
- Faculty of Medicine and Health Sciences of the Andrzej Frycz Modrzewski Krakow University (Wydział Lekarski i Nauk o Zdrowiu Krakowskiej Akademii im. Andrzeja Frycza Modrzewskiego)
- Faculty of Health Sciences and Physical Culture of the Kazimierz Pułaski University of Technology and Humanities in Radom (Wydział Nauk o Zdrowiu i Kultury Fizycznej Uniwersytetu Technologiczno-Humanistycznego im. Kazimierza Pułaskiego w Radomiu)
- Faculty of Natural Sciences and Technology of the University of Opole (Wydział Przyrodniczo-Techniczny Uniwersytetu Opolskiego)
- Faculty of Medicine of the Lazarski University in Warsaw (Wydział Medyczny Uczelni Łazarskiego)
- Faculty of Medical Sciences of the Katowice School of Technology (Wydział Nauk Medycznych Wyższej Szkoły Technicznej w Katowicach)
- Faculty of Medicine. Collegium Medicum of the Cardinal Stefan Wyszyński University in Warsaw (Wydział Medyczny. Collegium Medicum Uniwersytetu Kardynała Stefana Wyszyńskiego w Warszawie)

== Portugal ==
- Universidade Nova de Lisboa, NOVA Medical School (Universidade Nova de Lisboa, Faculdade de Ciências Médicas)
- University of Algarve, Biomedical Sciences and Medicine Department (Universidade do Algarve, Departamento de Ciências Biomédicas e Medicina)
- University of Beira Interior, Faculty of Health Sciences (Universidade da Beira Interior, Faculdade de Ciências da Saúde)
- University of Coimbra, Faculty of Medicine (Universidade de Coimbra, Faculdade de Medicina)
- University of Lisbon, Faculty of Medicine (Universidade de Lisboa, Faculdade de Medicina)
- University of Minho, School of Health Sciences (Universidade do Minho, Escola de Ciências da Saúde)
- University of Porto, Faculty of Medicine (Universidade do Porto, Faculdade de Medicina)
- University of Porto, Institute of Biomedical Sciences Abel Salazar (Universidade do Porto, Instituto de Ciências Biomédicas Abel Salazar)

== Romania ==
- University of Medicine and Pharmacy "Grigore T. Popa", Iași (Universitatea Grigore T. Popa de Medicină şi Farmacie din Iaşi)
- University of Medicine and Pharmacy "Carol Davila", Bucharest (Universitatea de Medicina si Farmacie Carol Davila)
- University of Medicine and Pharmacy "Iuliu Hatieganu", Cluj-Napoca (Universitatea de Medicină şi Farmacie Iuliu Hatieganu)
- University of Oradea, (Universitatea din Oradea-Facultatea de Medicina si Farmacie)
- Victor Babeș University of Medicine and Pharmacy, Timișoara (Universitatea de Medicină şi Farmacie "Victor Babeș" Timișoara)
- Transylvania University of Brașov- Faculty of Medicine (Universitatea Transilvania din Brașov – Facultatea de Medicina)
- University of Medicine and Pharmacy of Târgu Mureş (Universitatea de Medicină şi Farmacie din Târgu-Mureş), in Hungarian language also
- University of Medicine and Pharmacy of Craiova (Universitatea de Medicină şi Farmacie din Craiova)
- Lucian Blaga University of Sibiu - Faculty of Medicine (Universitatea "Lucian Blaga" din Sibiu)
- Ovidius University, Constanța - Faculty of Medicine (Universitatea Ovidius Constanța )
- Titu Maiorescu University - Faculty of Medicine Bucharest (Universitatea "Titu Maiorescu" Bucuresti) - Facultatea de medicina
- Vasile Goldiş West University of Arad – Faculty of Medicine (Facultatea de Medicină, Farmacie și Medicină Dentară a Universității de Vest "Vasile Goldiș" Arad)
- University of Galați - Faculty of Medicine and Pharmacy (Universitatea „Dunărea de Jos” din Galați ) - Facultatea de medicina si farmacie

== Russia ==
- First Moscow State Medical University
- First Pavlov State Medical University of Saint Peterburg, Saint Petersburg
- Izhevsk State Medical Academy
- Kursk State Medical University
- Moscow State University, Faculty of Fundamental Medicine
- Mordovian State University named after N.P. Ogarev, Saransk
- Northern State Medical University, Arkhangelsk
- North-West State Medical University named after I. I. Mechnikov, Saint Petersburg
- Novosibirsk State University - V. Zelman Institute for Medicine and Psychology
- Novosibirsk State Medical University
- Omsk State Medical University
- People's Friendship university - Institute of Medicine
- Privolzhsky Research Medical University, Nizhny Novgorod
- Rostov State Medical University, Rostov-on-Don
- Russian National Research Medical University, Moscow
- Ryazan State Medical University named after I.P. Pavlov
- Saint Petersburg State University - Faculty of Medicine
- Samara State Medical University
- Saratov State Medical University named after V.I. Razumovsky
- Siberian State Medical University, Tomsk
- Smolensk State Medical University
- Tver State Medical University
- Ural State Medical University, Yekaterinburg
- Volgograd State Medical University
- Voronezh State Medical University named after N. N. Burdenko

== Serbia ==
- University of Belgrade – Faculty of Medicine, Belgrade
- University of Novi Sad – Faculty of Medicine, Novi Sad
- University of Nis – Faculty of Medicine, Nis
- University of Kragujevac – Faculty of Medicine, Kragujevac
- Military Medical Academy – Faculty of Medicine, Belgrade

== Slovakia ==
- Comenius University – (Faculty of Medicine, Bratislava;
- Jessenius Faculty of Medicine, Martin)
- Slovak Medical University – Bratislava
- Faculty of Medicine, Pavol Jozef Šafárik University – Košice

== Slovenia ==
- University of Ljubljana – Faculty of Medicine
- University of Maribor – Faculty of Medicine

== Spain ==
- Universidad de Alcalá - Facultad de Medicina, Alcalá de Henares
- Universidad Alfonso X El Sabio: Facultad de Ciencias de la Salud, Madrid
- Universitat Autònoma de Barcelona: Facultad de Medicina, Cerdanyola del Vallès
- Universidad Autónoma de Madrid: Facultad de Medicina, Madrid
- Universitat de Barcelona - Facultad de Medicina, Barcelona
- Universidad de Cádiz - Facultad de Medicina, Cádiz
- Universidad de Cantabria - Facultad de Medicina, Santander, Spain
- University of Castilla–La Mancha: Facultad de Medicina, Albacete
- University of Castilla–La Mancha: Facultad de Medicina, Ciudad Real
- Valencia Catholic University Saint Vincent Martyr: Facultad de Psicología y Ciencias de la Salud, Valencia
- CEU San Pablo University: Facultad de Medicina, Madrid/Alcorcón
- Universidad CEU Cardenal Herrera: Facultad de Medicina, Castellón de la Plana
- Universidad Complutense de Madrid - Facultad de Medicina, Madrid
- Universidad de Córdoba - Facultad de Medicina, Córdoba
- University of the Basque Country: Facultad de Medicina y Odontología, Leioa
- Universidad Europea de Madrid: Facultad de Medicina, Villaviciosa de Odón
- Universidad de Extremadura - Facultad de Medicina, Badajoz
- Universidad Francisco de Vitoria: Facultad de Ciencias de la Salud, Pozuelo de Alarcón
- Universitat de Girona: Facultad de Medicina, Girona
- Universidad de Granada - Facultad de Medicina, Granada
- Universitat Internacional de Catalunya: Facultad de Medicina y Ciencias de la Salud, Sant Cugat del Vallès
- Universidad de La Laguna - Facultad de Medicina, San Cristóbal de La Laguna and Santa Cruz de Tenerife
- Universidad de Las Palmas de Gran Canaria: Facultad de Ciencias de la Salud, Las Palmas De Gran Canaria
- Universitat de Lleida: Facultad de Medicina, Lleida
- Universidad de Málaga - Facultad de Medicina, Málaga
- Miguel Hernández University of Elche: Facultad de Medicina, Sant Joan d'Alacant
- Universidad de Murcia - Facultad de Medicina, Murcia
- Universidad de Navarra: Facultad de Medicina, Pamplona
- Universidad de Oviedo - Facultad de Medicina, Oviedo
- Universidad Rey Juan Carlos: Facultad de Ciencias de la Salud, Alcorcón
- Universitat Rovira i Virgili: Facultad de Medicina y Ciencias de la Salud, Reus
- Universidad de Salamanca: Facultad de Medicina, Salamanca
- Universidad de Santiago de Compostela - Facultad de Medicina y Odontología, Santiago de Compostela
- Universidad de Sevilla - Facultad de Medicina, Seville
- Universidad de Valladolid - Facultad de Medicina, Valladolid
- Universitat de València - Facultad de Medicina y Odontología, Valencia
- Universidad de Zaragoza - Facultad de Medicina, Zaragoza

== Sweden ==
- University of Gothenburg, Institute of Medicine
- Karolinska Institutet
- Linköping University, Faculty of Medicine and Health Sciences
- Lund University, Faculty of Medicine
- Umeå University, Faculty of Medicine
- Uppsala University Faculty of Medicine
- Örebro University, Faculty of Medicine and Health

== Switzerland ==
- University of Basel
- University of Bern
- University of Geneva
- University of Fribourg
- University of Lausanne
- University of Zurich

== Transnistria ==
Note: (Note: Country with limited recognition.)

- Taras Shevchenko Transnistria State University

== Turkey ==
=== Istanbul ===
==== Public ====
- Istanbul Medeniyet University Faculty of Medicine
- Istanbul University Faculty of Medicine
- Istanbul University-Cerrahpaşa Faculty of Medicine
- Marmara University Faculty of Medicine
- University of Health Sciences, Hamidiye Medical School
- University of Health Sciences, Hamidiye International Medical School

==== Private ====
- Acıbadem University School of Medicine
- Bahçeşehir University School of Medicine
- Bezmialem Vakif University School of Medicine
- Biruni University School of Medicine
- Halic University School of Medicine
- Demiroğlu Bilim University
- Istanbul Arel University
- Istanbul Atlas University
- Istanbul Aydin University
- Istanbul Beykent University
- Istanbul Health and Technology University
- Istanbul Medipol University
- Istanbul Nişantaşı University
- Istanbul Okan University
- Istanbul Yeni Yüzyıl University Faculty of Medicine
- İstinye University School of Medicine
- Koç University Faculty of Medicine
- Maltepe University Faculty of Medicine
- Üsküdar University Faculty of Medicine
- Yeditepe University

=== Ankara ===
==== Public ====
- Ankara University Medical School
- Ankara Yıldırım Beyazıt University School of Medicine
- Gazi University School of Medicine
- Hacettepe University Medical School
- University of Health Sciences, Gülhane School of Medicine

==== Private ====
- Ankara Medipol University School of Medicine
- Atılım University School of Medicine
- Başkent University School of Medicine
- Lokman Hekim University School of Medicine
- TOBB University of Economy and Technology Faculty of Medicine
- Ufuk University Faculty of Medicine
- Yüksek İhtisas University Faculty of Medicine

=== Izmir ===
==== Public ====
- Dokuz Eylül University School of Medicine
- Ege University School of Medicine
- İzmir Bakırçay University School of Medicine
- İzmir Democracy University School of Medicine
- İzmir Kâtip Çelebi University School of Medicine
- University of Health Sciences, Izmir School of Medicine

==== Private ====
- İzmir Tınaztepe University School of Medicine
- İzmir University of Economics School of Medicine

=== Gaziantep ===
- Gaziantep University School of Medicine
- Gaziantep Islam Science and Technology University School of Medicine
- Sanko University School of Medicine

=== Konya ===
- Selçuk University School of Medicine
- Necmettin Erbakan University School of Medicine
- KTO Karatay University School of Medicine

=== Adana ===
- Çukurova University School of Medicine
- University of Health Sciences, Adana School of Medicine

=== Antalya ===
- Akdeniz University School of Medicine
- Alanya Alaaddin Keykubat University School of Medicine

=== Balikesir ===
- Balıkesir University School of Medicine
- Bandırma Onyedi Eylül University School of Medicine

=== Bursa ===
- Bursa Uludağ University School of Medicine
- University of Health Sciences, Bursa School of Medicine

=== Erzurum ===
- Atatürk University School of Medicine
- University of Health Sciences, Erzurum School of Medicine

=== Kayseri ===
- Erciyes University School of Medicine
- University of Health Sciences, Kayseri School of Medicine

=== Malatya ===
- İnönü University
- Malatya Turgut Özal University

=== Samsun ===
- Ondokuz Mayıs University
- Samsun University

=== Trabzon ===
- Karadeniz Technical University
- University of Health Sciences, Trabzon School of Medicine

=== Other cities ===
- Adıyaman University School of Medicine
- Afyonkarahisar Health Sciences University School of Medicine
- Ağrı İbrahim Çeçen University School of Medicine
- Aksaray University School of Medicine
- Amasya University School of Medicine
- Aydın Adnan Menderes University School of Medicine
- Bilecik Şeyh Edebali University School of Medicine
- Bolu Abant Izzet Baysal University School of Medicine
- Manisa Celal Bayar University School of Medicine
- Sivas Cumhuriyet University School of Medicine
- Çanakkale Onsekiz Mart University School of Medicine
- Dicle University School of Medicine
- Düzce University School of Medicine
- Eskişehir Osmangazi University School of Medicine
- Fırat University School of Medicine
- Giresun University School of Medicine
- Hatay Mustafa Kemal University Tayfur Ata Sökmen Faculty of Medicine
- Hitit University
- Harran University
- Kafkas University
- Kahramanmaraş Sütçü İmam University
- Karabük University
- Karamanoğlu Mehmetbey University
- Kastamonu University
- Kırıkkale University
- Kırklareli University
- Kırşehir Ahi Evran University
- Kütahya Health Sciences University
- Kocaeli University
- Mersin University
- Mugla Sitki Kocman University
- Nigde Omer Halisdemir University
- Necmettin Erbakan University
- Ordu University
- Pamukkale University
- Recep Tayyip Erdogan University
- Sakarya University
- Siirt University
- Süleyman Demirel University
- Tekirdağ Namık Kemal University
- Tokat Gaziosmanpaşa University School of Medicine
- Trakya University
- Van Yüzüncü Yıl University
- Yalova University
- Yozgat Bozok University
- Zonguldak Bülent Ecevit University School of Medicine

== Ukraine ==
- Uzhhorod National University
- Kyiv Medical University of UAFM
- Bukovinian State Medical University
- O.O. Bogomolets National Medical University
- Ukrainian Medical and Dental Academy
- Bogomoletz Institute of Physiology, Kyiv
- Crimea State Medical University
- Danylo Halytsky Lviv National Medical University
- Dnipro State Medical University
- Dnipro Medical Institute of Conventional and Alternative Medicine
- Donetsk National Medical University
- Ivano-Frankivsk National Medical University
- Vasyl Karazin Kharkiv National University, School of Fundamental Medicine
- Kharkiv Medical Academy of Post-graduate Education
- Kharkiv National Medical University
- Luhansk State Medical University
- Odesa National Medical University
- Sumy State University, medical institute
- Ternopil State Medical University
- Vinnytsia National Medical University. N. I. Pirogov
- Zaporizhzhia State Medical University
- The International Academy of ecology and medicine
- International European University - Private Institution

== United Kingdom ==
=== England ===
- Anglia Ruskin University School of Medicine, Chelmsford
- Aston University Medical School, Birmingham
- Barts and The London School of Medicine and Dentistry, London
- Brighton and Sussex Medical School, Brighton
- Bristol Medical School, Bristol
- Brunel Medical School, London
- Durham University School of Medicine and Health
- Edge Hill University Medical School, Ormskirk
- Hull York Medical School, York
- Imperial College School of Medicine, London
- Keele University School of Medicine
- King's College London School of Medicine and Dentistry, London
- Lancaster Medical School, Lancaster, Lancashire
- Leeds School of Medicine, Leeds
- Leicester Medical School, Leicester
- Liverpool Medical School, Liverpool
- Manchester Medical School, Manchester
- Medical Sciences Division, University of Oxford, Oxford
- Newcastle University Medical School, Newcastle upon Tyne
- Norwich Medical School at the University of East Anglia, Norwich
- Peninsula College of Medicine and Dentistry, Plymouth
- St George's, University of London
- School of Clinical Medicine, University of Cambridge, Cambridge
- Sheffield Medical School, Sheffield
- Southampton Medical School, Southampton

 Swansea Medical School (Graduate Entry)

- UCL Medical School, London
- University of Birmingham Medical School, Birmingham
- University of Buckingham Medical School, Buckingham
- University of Central Lancashire School of Medicine, Preston
- University of Chester Chester Medical School, Chester (graduate-entry)
- University of Exeter Medical School, Exeter
- University of Nottingham Medical School, Derby (graduate-entry)
- University of Nottingham Medical School, Lincoln
- University of Nottingham Medical School, Nottingham
- University of Sunderland School of Medicine, Sunderland
- University of Worcester Three Counties Medical School, Worcester (graduate-entry)
- Warwick Medical School, Coventry

=== Northern Ireland ===
- Queen's University Belfast Medical School, Belfast
- Ulster University, Derry

=== Scotland ===
- University of Aberdeen School of Medicine
- University of St Andrews School of Medicine
- Dundee Medical School
- University of Edinburgh Medical School
- Glasgow Medical School

=== Wales ===
- Cardiff University School of Medicine, Cardiff
- Swansea University Medical School, Swansea
- North Wales Medical School, Bangor, Gwynedd
