= List of university speech–language pathology departments =

- Algeria:
  - University of Algiers
- Australia:
  - University of Queensland
  - James Cook University
  - La Trobe University
  - University of Sydney
  - University of Newcastle, Australia
  - Charles Sturt University
  - Macquarie University
  - Flinders University
  - Curtin University of Technology
- Bangladesh:
  - University of Dhaka
  - Bangladesh Health Professions Institute
- Brazil:
  - College of Medical Sciences of Santa Casa de São Paulo
  - Pontifical Catholic University of São Paulo
  - University of São Paulo
  - Federal University of São Paulo
  - State University of São Paulo
- Canada:
  - University of Alberta
  - University of British Columbia
  - Dalhousie University
  - Université Laval
  - McGill University
  - Université de Montréal
  - University of Ottawa
  - University of Toronto
  - University of Western Ontario
- Hong Kong:
  - University of Hong Kong
- India:
  - All India Institute of Speech and Hearing
  - National Institute of Speech and Hearing
  - Ali Yavar Jung National Institute for the Hearing Handicapped (four regional centres)
- Israel:
  - University of Haifa
  - Tel Aviv University
  - Hadassah Academic College
- Malaysia:
  - Universiti Kebangsaan Malaysia
  - Universiti Sains Malaysia, Kelantan
- Philippines:
  - University of the Philippines Manila
  - University of Santo Tomas
  - De La Salle Medical and Health Sciences Institute
  - Cebu Doctors' University
  - University of Batangas
- South Korea:
  - Ewha Womans University
- Turkey:
  - Anadolu University
  - Ankara Yıldırım Beyazıt University
  - Biruni University
  - Cappadocia University
  - Hacettepe University
  - Istanbul Medipol University
  - Istinye University
  - İzmir Bakırçay University
  - Ondokuz Mayıs University
  - University of Health Sciences (Turkey)
  - Üsküdar University
  - Istanbul Gelisim University
  - Kütahya Health Sciences University
  - Fenerbahçe University
- Uganda:
  - Makerere University
- United Kingdom:
  - Birmingham City University
  - City University London
  - de Montfort University
  - University College London
  - University of East Anglia
  - University of Reading
  - University of Sheffield
  - University of Strathclyde
  - University of Manchester
  - University of Newcastle upon Tyne
  - University of Ulster
  - University of Wales Institute, Cardiff
  - Leeds Metropolitan University
  - Manchester Metropolitan University
  - Queen Margaret University
- United States:
  - Abilene Christian University
  - Adelphi University
  - Alabama A&M University
  - Appalachian State University
  - Arizona State University
  - Arkansas State University
  - Auburn University
  - Ball State University
  - Baylor University
  - Commonwealth University-Bloomsburg
  - Boston University
  - Bowling Green State University
  - Brigham Young University
  - Brooklyn College
  - Buffalo State University
  - California State University, Chico
  - California State University, East Bay
  - California State University, Fresno
  - California State University, Fullerton
  - California State University, Long Beach
  - California State University, Los Angeles
  - California State University, Northridge
  - California State University, Sacramento
  - California State University, San Marcos
  - Calvin University
  - Case Western Reserve University
  - Central Michigan University
  - Chapman University
  - Cleveland State University
  - The College of Wooster
  - Duquesne University
  - East Carolina University
  - East Stroudsburg University
  - East Tennessee State University
  - Eastern Illinois University
  - Eastern Kentucky University
  - Eastern Michigan University
  - Eastern New Mexico University
  - Eastern Washington University
  - Emerson College
  - Florida Atlantic University
  - Florida International University
  - Florida State University
  - Fort Hays State University
  - Francis Marion University
  - SUNY Fredonia
  - Gallaudet University
  - SUNY Geneseo
  - George Washington University
  - Georgia State University
  - Georgia Southern University–Armstrong Campus
  - Governors State University
  - Hampton University
  - Harding University
  - Hofstra University
  - Howard University
  - Hunter College
  - Idaho State University
  - Illinois State University
  - Indiana State University
  - Indiana University-Bloomington
  - Indiana University of Pennsylvania
  - Ithaca College
  - Jackson State University
  - James Madison University
  - Kansas State University
  - Kean University
  - Kent State University
  - Lamar University
  - La Salle University
  - Lehman College
  - LIU Brooklyn
  - LIU Post
  - Loma Linda University
  - Longwood University
  - Louisiana State University
  - LSU Health Sciences Center Shreveport
  - Louisiana State University Medical Center
  - Louisiana Tech University
  - Loyola University Maryland
  - Marshall University
  - Marquette University
  - Marywood University
  - Mass General Brigham University of Health Professions
  - Mercy University
  - Miami University
  - Michigan State University
  - Minnesota State University, Mankato
  - Minot State University
  - Misericordia University
  - Mississippi University for Women
  - Missouri State University
  - Molloy University
  - Montclair State University
  - Moorhead State University
  - Murray State University
  - Nazareth University
  - New Mexico State University
  - SUNY New Paltz
  - New York Medical College
  - New York University
  - North Carolina Central University
  - Northeastern University
  - Northeastern State University
  - Northern Arizona University
  - Northern Illinois University
  - Northwestern University
  - Nova Southeastern University
  - Old Dominion University
  - Ohio State University
  - Ohio University
  - Oklahoma State University
  - Our Lady of the Lake University
  - Pennsylvania State University
  - PennWest California
  - PennWest Clarion
  - PennWest Edinboro
  - SUNY Plattsburgh
  - Portland State University
  - Purdue University
  - Queens College
  - Radford University
  - Rockhurst University
  - Rush University
  - St. Ambrose University
  - St. Cloud State University
  - St. John's University
  - St. Louis University
  - Saint Xavier University
  - San Diego State University
  - San Francisco State University
  - San Jose State University
  - Seton Hall University
  - South Carolina State University
  - Southeastern Louisiana University
  - Southeast Missouri State University
  - Southern Connecticut State University
  - Southern Illinois University–Edwardsville
  - Southern Illinois University–Carbondale
  - Southern University
  - Stephen F. Austin State University
  - Stockton University
  - Syracuse University
  - Teachers College, Columbia University
  - Temple University
  - Tennessee State University
  - Texas A&M University at Kingsville
  - Texas Christian University
  - Texas State University
  - Texas Tech University Health Sciences Center
  - Texas Woman's University
  - Touro College
  - Towson University
  - Truman State University
  - Universidad del Turabo
  - University of Akron
  - The University of Alabama
  - University of Arizona
  - University of Arkansas–Fayetteville
  - University of Arkansas–Little Rock
  - University at Buffalo
  - University of Cincinnati
  - University of Central Arkansas
  - University of Central Florida
  - University of Central Missouri
  - University of Central Oklahoma
  - University of Colorado
  - University of Connecticut
  - University of the District of Columbia
  - University of Georgia
  - University of Florida
  - University of Hawaiʻi at Mānoa
  - University of Houston
  - University of Iowa
  - University of Illinois at Urbana–Champaign
  - University of Kansas
  - University of Kentucky
  - University of Louisiana at Lafayette
  - University of Louisiana–Monroe
  - University of Louisville
  - University of Maine
  - University of Massachusetts–Amherst
  - University of Maryland–College Park
  - University of Memphis
  - University of Minnesota
  - University of Minnesota Duluth
  - University of Mississippi
  - University of Missouri
  - University of Montana
  - University of Montevallo
  - University of Nebraska–Kearney
  - University of Nebraska–Lincoln
  - University of Nebraska–Omaha
  - University of Nevada, Reno
  - University of New Hampshire
  - University of New Mexico
  - University of North Carolina
  - University of North Carolina–Greensboro
  - University of North Texas
  - University of North Dakota
  - University of Northern Colorado
  - University of Northern Iowa
  - University of Oklahoma Health Sciences Center
  - University of Oregon
  - University of Pittsburgh
  - University of Puerto Rico
  - University of Redlands
  - University of Rhode Island
  - University of South Alabama
  - University of South Carolina
  - University of South Dakota
  - University of South Florida
  - University of Southern Mississippi
  - University of Tennessee–Knoxville
  - University of Texas at Austin
  - University of Texas at Dallas
  - University of Texas at El Paso
  - University of Texas-Pan American
  - University of Toledo
  - University of Tulsa
  - University of Utah
  - University of the Pacific
  - University of Vermont
  - University of Virginia
  - University of Washington
  - University of West Georgia
  - University of Wisconsin–Eau Claire
  - University of Wisconsin–Madison
  - University of Wisconsin–Milwaukee
  - University of Wisconsin–River Falls
  - University of Wisconsin–Stevens Point
  - University of Wisconsin–Whitewater
  - University of Wyoming
  - Utah State University
  - Valdosta State University
  - Vanderbilt University
  - Washington State University
  - Washington State University, Spokane
  - Wayne State University
  - West Chester University
  - West Texas A&M University
  - West Virginia University
  - Western Carolina University
  - Western Illinois University
  - Western Kentucky University
  - Western Michigan University
  - Western Washington University
  - Wichita State University
  - William Paterson University
  - Worcester State University
