= Swathi Kiran =

American speech-language pathologist and neuroscientist

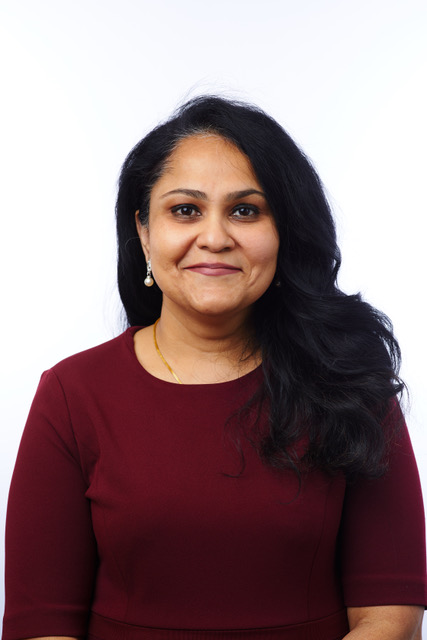
- Education: All India Institute of Speech and Hearing (BSc); Northwestern University (MA, PhD)
- Known for: Research on aphasia and bilingual language recovery
- Awards: Honors of the Association, American Speech–Language–Hearing Association (2024)
- Scientific career
- Fields: Speech–language pathology, neuroscience, neurorehabilitation
- Institutions: Boston University; University of Texas at Austin

Swathi Kiran is an American speech–language pathologist and neuroscientist. She is the James and Cecilia Tse Ying Professor of Neurorehabilitation at Boston University, where she directs the Center for Brain Recovery. In 2024, she received the Honors of the Association from the American Speech–Language–Hearing Association (ASHA), the organization's highest honor, and in 2025 she was named incoming editor-in-chief of the language section of the Journal of Speech, Language, and Hearing Research.

== Early life and education ==
Kiran earned a Bachelor of Science in speech pathology and audiology from the All India Institute of Speech and Hearing in 1995. She then moved to the United States, where she completed a Master of Arts (1998) and a PhD (2001) in speech–language pathology at Northwestern University.

== Career ==
Kiran joined the faculty of the University of Texas at Austin in 2002, where she served as assistant and later associate professor. In 2009, she moved to Boston University's Sargent College of Health & Rehabilitation Sciences. She was promoted to professor in 2014 and appointed the James and Cecilia Tse Ying Professor of Neurorehabilitation in 2019.

In 2022, Boston University established the Center for Brain Recovery, with Kiran as its founding director. The center conducts research on aphasia and other acquired language disorders and supports rehabilitation and community-based programs for people recovering from stroke and brain injury.

Kiran co-founded Constant Therapy, a digital platform for speech, language, and cognitive rehabilitation after stroke and traumatic brain injury, and has served as its scientific director.

== Research ==
Kiran's research focuses on aphasia, bilingual language recovery, and neurorehabilitation following stroke. Her early work with Cynthia K. Thompson examined the role of semantic complexity in the treatment of naming deficits in fluent aphasia, reporting that training atypical (more complex) items generalized to improvement on typical (less complex) items, leading to development of Complexity account of Treatment Efficacy.

Her research also examines the treatment of language deficits in bilingual aphasia and the mechanisms of cross-language generalization, including evidence that semantic naming treatment in one language can produce generalization to the untreated language. In 2026, she and colleagues reported a double-blind randomized controlled trial using computational "digital twin" models to predict treatment outcomes in bilingual aphasia. Her work on bilingual stroke recovery was featured by American Heart Association News in 2025.

Through studies conducted with data from the Constant Therapy platform, Kiran and colleagues have examined how treatment dosage, frequency, and intensity affect rehabilitation outcomes in self-managed digital therapy.

Her research also combines neuroimaging, computational modeling, and machine learning to investigate how language networks reorganize after stroke and to predict treatment outcomes for individuals with aphasia. A 2024 review co-authored with Anne Billot examined the neuroplasticity mechanisms underlying post-stroke language recovery.

== Editorial and professional service ==
Kiran served as associate editor of the language section of the Journal of Speech, Language, and Hearing Research from 2010 to 2017, and in 2025 was selected as incoming editor-in-chief of the journal's language section, with her term beginning in January 2026. She also serves as an associate editor of Brain and Language and Scientific Reports, and has served as a section editor of Cortex and Neuropsychologia.

She chaired the board of governors of the Academy of Aphasia from 2020 to 2023 and served on the board of trustees of the American Speech-Language-Hearing Foundation from 2022 to 2024.She has served on the research of the National Aphasia Association since 2020, where she is listed among the organization's leadership.

Since 2024, Kiran has been a member of the National Deafness and Other Communication Disorders Advisory Council of the National Institute on Deafness and Other Communication Disorders, part of the National Institutes of Health, with a term running through 2028.

== Honors ==
- Fellow, American Speech–Language–Hearing Association (2013)
- Honors of the Association, American Speech–Language–Hearing Association (2024)

== Selected publication ==
- Kiran, S.; Thompson, C. K. (2003). "The role of semantic complexity in treatment of naming deficits: Training semantic categories in fluent aphasia by controlling exemplar typicality". Journal of Speech, Language, and Hearing Research. 46 (3): 608–622.
