= St. Theresa's Medical University =

St. Theresa's Medical University may refer to:

- St. Theresa's Medical University (St. Kitts)
- St. Theresa's Medical University of Yerevan
