= Euridice (project) =

European Union-funded education initiative

Euridice (EURopean Inclusive education for Digital society, social Innovation, and global CitizEnship) is a European Union-funded initiative aimed at promoting inclusive digital education and social innovation in Europe.

The consortium behind Euridice consists of 11 European universities, two independent digital research centers, two cultural institutes, six SMEs and four associated universities.

== Participating Institutes ==
=== Universities ===
- Vrije Universiteit - Amsterdam
- University of Naples Federico II - Naples
- University of Innsbruck
- University of Iceland - Reykjavík
- Universiti Malaysia Sarawak (UNIMAS) - Kuching
- Universidade Lusófona - Lisbon
- University for Development Studies - Tamale, Ghana
- TU Wien, Vienna
- Pavol Jozef Šafárik University, Košice
- Palacký University Olomouc Czech Republic
- University of Lviv, Lviv, Ukraine
- National University of Kharkiv ukraine
- University of Barcelona
- I-CATS University College - Sarawak
- Copenhagen Business School

=== Other participants ===
- The Value Engineers - Netherlands
- SBC4D - France
- Leeuw Film
- Royal Library of the Netherlands - The Hague, netherlands
- Icelandic Institute for Intelligent Machines - Reykjavík
- Haus der Kulturen der Welt - Berlin
- Fraunhofer-Gesellschaft - Germany
- Babafla - Netherlands
- AKMC Knowledge Management
- Healthink - Griekenland
