= RVmagnetics =

Research and development company in Slovakia

RVmagnetics, a. s. is a research and development company based in Slovakia that specializes in manufacturing and customisation of contactless MicroWire based sensor technology for the industry 4.0, medical and biomedical technologies, electric motors, composites, construction and civil engineering, transportation and logistics. Sensor directly measures temperature, pressure and magnetic field, indirectly also other physical quantities such as stress, torsion, bending, movement, vibration, flow, electric current, position in the magnetic field etc.

== History ==
The company was founded in 2015 by Rastislav Varga, Professor at Pavol Jozef Šafárik University in Košice and member of the European Magnetism Association. More than two thirds of the company's staff are members of the R&D team with the primary focus on customising MicroWire technology.

== Services ==
Scope of their work basically lays in prototyping and customisation. The main focus of the company is on MicroWire sensing technologies that can be used where contactless sensing is of essence – due to size constraints, rotary movement of devices etc.

== Usage of technology ==
Based on microwire technology and magnetic fields, the sensor is capable of sending real time data regarding physical quantities. Sensors are suitable for adapting IIoT (industrial internet of things), allow nondestructive testing and structural health monitoring and can be embedded into many materials without changing the materials’ properties. RVmagnetics technology allows one to obtain signal from the microwire from 10 cm away, even through the layers of various materials including metal, composite materials, concrete, human tissue, wood etc.

== Acceleration programs ==
RVmagnetics has participated in several prestigious acceleration programs aimed at fostering innovation and deep-tech scale-up:

- NATO DIANA Phase 1 – Defence Innovation Accelerator for the North Atlantic January 2025 – June 2025, hybrid, London, United Kingdom Selected as part of the 2025 cohort supporting dual-use technologies for sensing and surveillance in defence and security.
- NATO DIANA Phase 2 – Defence Innovation Accelerator for the North Atlantic September 2025 – February 2026. Selected as one of only 15 companies to continue the Acceleration programme supporting dual-use technologies.
- SIXTH SENSE by HEXAGON September 2023 – January 2024, hybrid, London, United Kingdom Participated in a program focused on advancing smart manufacturing and industrial automation solutions.
- BIND – Basque Open Innovation Platform February 2023 – July 2023, hybrid, Bilbao and San Sebastian, Basque Country, Spain Joined as a startup partner with leading industry players in the Basque Country for open innovation in Industry 4.0.
- Sustainable Aero Lab February 2022 – September 2022, hybrid, Hamburg, Germany Engaged in accelerating aviation-related sustainability and aerospace innovation.

== Awards ==
RVmagnetics has been recognized internationally with several awards for its innovation and business impact:

- Top Pitch - European Defence Week, November 2025, Paris, France. Selected by the jury for cutting-edge solutions and potential to shape the future of defence and security in Europe.
- Silver Digital Pie Award April 2024, Bratislava, Slovakia. Received for outstanding global organic website traffic growth in collaboration with SEO agency Visibility.
- TechConnect Innovation Award June 2023, National Harbor, Maryland, USA. Honored for groundbreaking sensing technology at the TechConnect World Innovation Conference & Expo.
- Impact Stars Laureate at Deloitte Technology Fast 50 Central Europe November 2023, Bratislava, Slovakia. Recognized for positive impact through hardware technological innovation.
- Winner – INAM Open Innovation Challenge August 2022, Berlin, Germany. Awarded for innovative sensing solutions for smart belts for a client Continental Industry.
- Supercharge Award – EIT Manufacturing June 2022, Vienna, Austria. Recognized as a top scale-up in Central and Eastern Europe by the European Institute of Innovation & Technology.
- Best IoT Startup – CESA Awards (Slovakia) September 2019, Bratislava, Slovakia. Named best Internet of Things startup at the Central European Startup Awards.
