= Speech–language pathology =

Disability therapy profession

- Broca's area (speech production) and Wernicke's area (language comprehension)
- MeSH: D013066

Speech–language pathology, also known as speech and language pathology or logopedics, is a healthcare and academic discipline concerning the evaluation, treatment, and prevention of communication disorders, including expressive and mixed receptive-expressive language disorders, voice disorders, speech sound disorders, speech disfluency, pragmatic language impairments, and social communication difficulties, as well as swallowing disorders across the lifespan.

The field of speech-language pathology is practiced by a clinician known as a speech–language pathologist (SLP) or a speech and language therapist (SLT). It is an allied health profession regulated by professional state licensing boards including the Royal College of Speech and Language Therapists in the UK; American Speech-Language-Hearing Assocation (ASHA) in the United States of America, and Speech Pathology Australia in Australia.

== History ==
The development of speech-language pathology into a profession took different paths in the various regions of the world. Three identifiable trends influenced the evolution of speech-language pathology in the United States during the late 19th century to early 20th century: the elocution movement, scientific revolution, and the rise of professionalism. Groups of "speech correctionists" formed in the early 1900s. The American Academy of Speech Correction was founded in 1925, which became ASHA in 1978.

== Profession ==
Speech–language pathologists (SLPs) provide a wide range of services, mainly on an individual basis, but also as support for families, support groups, and providing information for the general public. SLPs work to assess levels of communication needs, make diagnoses based on the assessments, and then treat the diagnoses or address the needs. Speech/language services begin with initial screening for communication or swallowing disorders and continue with assessment and diagnosis, consultation for the provision of advice regarding management, intervention, and treatment, and providing counseling and other followup services for these disorders. Services are provided in the following areas:

- Developmental language and early feeding neurodevelopment and prevention;
- Cognitive aspects of communication (e.g., attention, memory, problem-solving, executive functions);
- Speech (phonation, articulation, fluency, resonance, and voice including aeromechanical components of respiration);
- Language (phonology, morphology, syntax, semantics, and pragmatic/social aspects of communication) including comprehension and expression in oral, written, graphic, and manual modalities; language processing; preliteracy and language-based literacy skills, phonological awareness;
- Augmentative and alternative communication (AAC) for individuals with severe language and communication impairments;
- Swallowing or other upper aerodigestive functions such as infant feeding and aeromechanical events (evaluation of esophageal function is for the purpose of referral to medical professionals);
- Voice (hoarseness, dysphonia), poor vocal volume (hypophonia), abnormal (e.g., rough, breathy, strained) vocal quality. Research demonstrates voice therapy to be especially helpful with certain patient populations; individuals with Parkinson's Disease often develop voice issues as a result of their disease.
- Sensory awareness related to communication, swallowing, or other upper aerodigestive functions.

Speech, language, and swallowing disorders result from a variety of causes, such as a stroke, brain injury, hearing loss, developmental delay, a cleft palate, cerebral palsy, or emotional issues.

A common misconception is that speech–language pathology is restricted to the treatment of articulation disorders (e.g., helping English-speaking individuals enunciate the traditionally difficult r) or the treatment of individuals who stutter but, in fact, speech–language pathology is concerned with a broad scope of speech, language, literacy, swallowing, and voice issues involved in communication, some of which include:

- Word-finding and other semantic issues, either as a result of a specific language impairment (SLI) such as a language delay or as a secondary characteristic of a more general issue such as dementia.
- Social communication difficulties involving how people communicate or interact with others (pragmatics).
- Language impairments, including difficulties creating sentences that are grammatical (syntax) and modifying word meaning (morphology).
- Literacy impairments (reading and writing) related to the letter-to-sound relationship (phonics), the word-to-meaning relationship (semantics), and understanding the ideas presented in a text (reading comprehension).
- Voice difficulties, such as a raspy voice, a voice that is too soft, or other voice difficulties that negatively impact a person's social or professional performance.
- Cognitive impairments (e.g. attention, memory, executive function) to the extent that they interfere with communication.
- Parent, caregiver, and other communication partner coaching.

Primary pediatric speech and language disorders include: receptive and expressive language disorders, speech sound disorders, childhood apraxia of speech (CAS), stuttering, and language-based learning disabilities. Speech-language pathologists (SLPs) work with people of all ages.

Swallowing disorders include difficulties in any phase of the swallowing process (i.e., oral, pharyngeal, esophageal), as well as functional dysphagia and feeding disorders. Swallowing disorders can occur at any age and can stem from multiple causes.

=== Multi-discipline collaboration ===
SLPs collaborate with other health care professionals, often working as part of a multidisciplinary team. They can provide information and referrals to audiologists, physicians, dentists, nurses, nurse practitioners, occupational therapists, rehabilitation psychologists, dietitians, educators, behavior consultants (applied behavior analysis), and parents as dictated by the individual client's needs. For example, the treatment for patients with cleft lip and palate often requires multidisciplinary collaboration. Speech–language pathologists can be very beneficial in helping resolve speech problems associated with cleft lip and palate. Research has indicated that children who receive early language intervention are less likely to develop compensatory error patterns later in life, although speech therapy outcomes are usually better when surgical treatment is performed earlier. Another area of collaboration relates to auditory processing disorders, where SLPs can collaborate in assessments and provide intervention where there is evidence of speech, language, and/or other cognitive-communication disorders.

=== Working environments ===
SLPs work in a variety of clinical and educational settings. SLPs work in public and private hospitals, private practices, skilled nursing facilities (SNFs), long-term acute care (LTAC) facilities, hospice, and home healthcare. SLPs may also work as part of the support structure in the education system, working in both public and private schools, colleges, and universities. Some SLPs also work in community health, providing services at prisons and young offenders' institutions or providing expert testimony in applicable court cases.

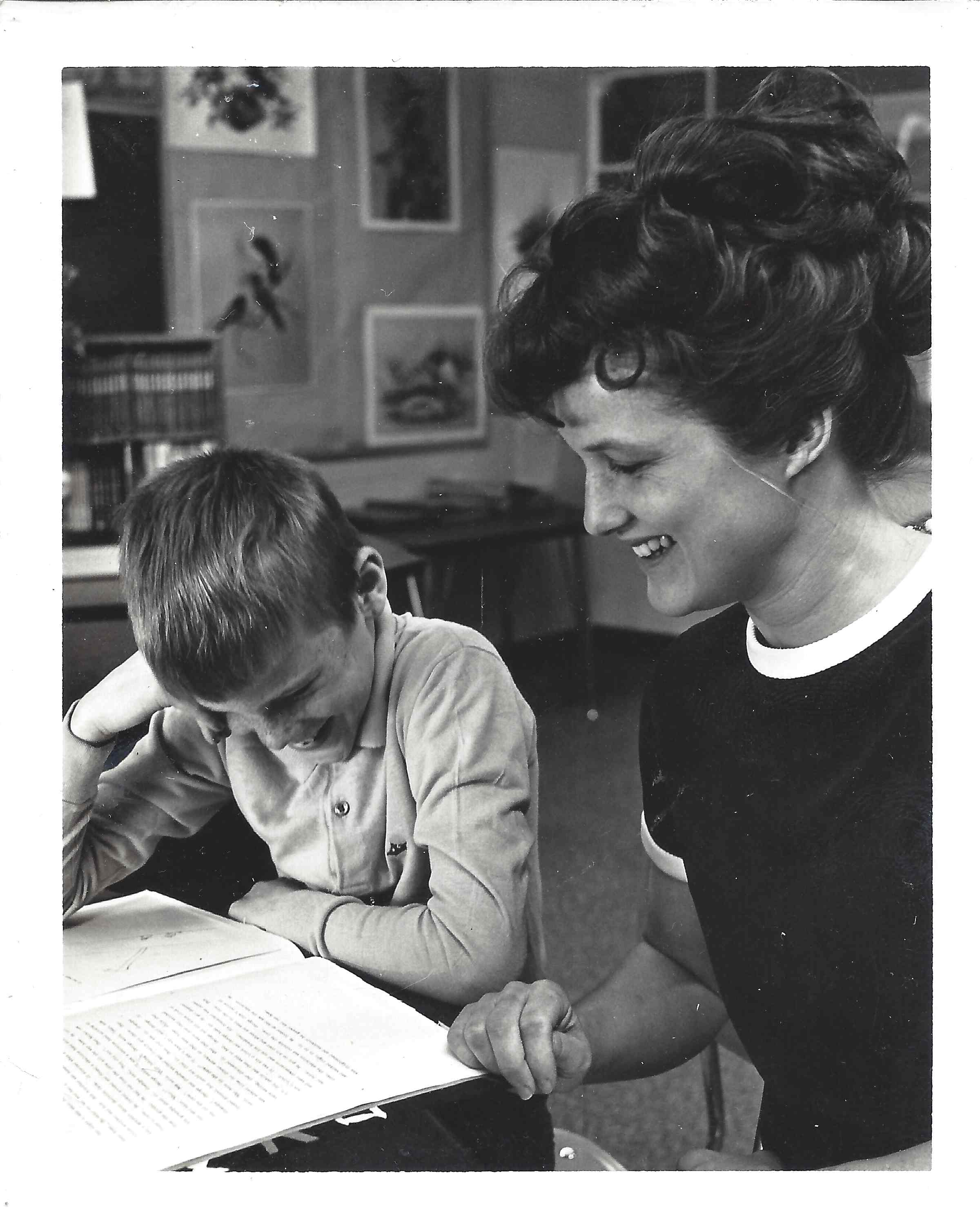
Some SLPs' working environments include one-on-one time with the client.

Following ASHA's 2005 approval of the delivery of speech/language services via video conference or telepractice, SLPs in the United States have begun to use this service model.

Children with speech, language, and communication needs (SLCN) are particularly at risk of not being heard because of communication challenges. Speech-language pathologists (SLPs) can explain the significance of supporting communication as a tool for the child to shape and influence choices available to them in their lives, even though it is advised that children with SLCN can and should be actively involved as equal partners in decision-making about their communication needs. Building these skills is especially crucial for SLPs working in settings related to traditional education.

=== Research ===
SLPs conduct research related to communication sciences and disorders, swallowing disorders, or other upper aerodigestive functions.

Experimental, empirical, and scientific methodologies that build on hypothesis testing and logical, deductive reasoning have dominated research in speech-language pathology. Other types of research in the field are complemented by qualitative research.

=== Education and training ===
==== United States ====
In the United States, speech–language pathologists must hold a master's degree from an ASHA-accredited program. Following graduation and passing a nation-wide board exam, SLPs typically begin their Clinical Fellowship Year, during which they are granted a provisional license and receive guidance from their supervisor. At the end of this process, SLPs apply for full state licensure and may choose to apply & purchase ASHA's Certificate of Clinical Competence (CCC) annually. SLPs may additionally choose to earn advanced degrees such as a clinical doctorate in speech–language pathology, PhD, or EdD.

== Methods of assessment ==
Many approaches exist to assess language, communication, speech and swallowing. Two main aspects of assessment can be to determine the extent of breakdown (impairment-level), or how communication can be supported (functional level). When evaluating impairment-based level of breakdown, therapists are trained to use a cognitive neuropsychological approach to assessment, to precisely determine what aspect of communication is impaired. Some therapists use assessments that are based on historic anatomical models of language, that have since been shown to be unreliable. These tools are often preferred by therapists working within a medical model, where medics request a 'type' of impairment, and a 'severity' rating. The broad tools available allow clinicians to precisely select the aspect of communication that they wish to assess.

Because school-based speech therapy is run under state guidelines and funds, the process of assessment and qualification is more strict. To qualify for in-school speech therapy, students must meet the state's criteria on language testing and speech standardization. Due to such requirements, some students may not be assessed in an efficient time frame or their needs may be undermined by criteria. For a private clinic, students are more likely to qualify for therapy because it is a paid service with more availability.

== Clients and patients ==
Speech–language pathologists work with clients and patients who may present with a wide range of issues.

=== Infants and children ===
- Premature infants are at higher risk of feeding and later language needs and SLTs work with this cohort to prevent developmental difficulties and support neonatal care
- Infants with injuries due to complications at birth, feeding and swallowing difficulties, including dysphagia
- Children with mild, moderate or severe:
  - Genetic disorders that adversely affect speech, language or cognitive development including cleft palate, Down syndrome, DiGeorge syndrome
  - Attention deficit hyperactivity disorder
  - Autism spectrum disorders, including Asperger syndrome
  - Developmental delay
  - Feeding disorders, including oral motor deficits
  - Cranial nerve damage
  - Hearing loss
  - Craniofacial anomalies that adversely affect speech, language or cognitive development
  - Language delay
  - Specific language impairment
  - Specific difficulties in producing sounds, called articulation disorders, (including vocalic /r/ and lisps)
  - Pediatric traumatic brain injury
  - Developmental verbal dyspraxia
  - Cleft palate

SLPs play an important role in the screening, diagnosis, and treatment of autism spectrum disorder (ASD), often in collaboration with pediatricians and psychologists.

==== United States ====
In the US, some children are eligible to receive speech therapy services, including assessment and lessons through the public school system. If not, private therapy is readily available through personal lessons with a qualified speech–language pathologist or the growing field of telepractice. Teleconferencing tools such as Zoom are being used more commonly as a means to access remote locations in private therapy practice, such as in the geographically diverse south island of New Zealand. More at-home or combination treatments have become readily available to address specific types of articulation disorders. The use of mobile applications in speech therapy is also growing as an avenue to bring treatment into the home.

==== United Kingdom ====
In the UK, children are entitled to an assessment by local NHS speech- and language-therapy teams, usually after referral by health visitors or education settings, but parents are also entitled to request an assessment directly. If treatment is appropriate, an educational plan will be drawn up. Speech therapists often play a role in multi-disciplinary teams when a child has speech delay or disorder as part of a wider health condition. The Children's Commissioner for England reported in June 2019 that there was a postcode lottery; £291.65 a year per head was spent on services in some areas, while the budget in some areas was £30.94 or less. In 2018, 193,971 children in English primary schools were on the special educational needs register needing speech-therapy services. Speech and language therapists work in acute settings and are often integrated into the MDT in multiple areas of speciality for neonatal, children and adult services. Areas include but not limited to; neonatal care, respiratory, ENT, gastrointestinal, stroke, Neurology, ICU, oncology and geriatric care.

=== Children and adults ===
- Puberphonia
- Neonatal care
- Respiratory
- ENT
- Cerebral palsy
- Head injury (Traumatic brain injury)
- Hearing loss and impairments
- Learning difficulties including
  - Dyslexia
  - Specific language impairment (SLI)
  - Auditory processing disorder
- Physical disabilities
- Speech disorders (such as oral dyspraxia)
- Stammering, stuttering (disfluency)
- Stroke
- Voice disorders (dysphonia)
- Language delay
- Motor speech disorders (dysarthria or developmental verbal dyspraxia)
- Naming difficulties (anomia)
- Dysgraphia, agraphia
- Cognitive communication disorders
- Pragmatics
- Laryngectomies
- Tracheostomies
- Oncology (ear, nose or throat cancer)

=== Adults ===
- Adults with aphasia
- Adults with mild, moderate, or severe eating, feeding and swallowing difficulties, including dysphagia
- Adults recovering from significant tumors in the bronchus, lung, oropharynx, breast, and brain
- Adults with mild, moderate, or severe language difficulties as a result of:
  - Motor neuron diseases,
  - Alzheimer's disease,
  - Dementia,
  - Huntington's disease,
  - Hearing loss
  - Multiple sclerosis,
  - Parkinson's disease,
  - Traumatic brain injury,
  - Mental health issues
  - Stroke
  - Progressive neurological conditions such as cancer of the head, neck and throat (including laryngectomy)
  - Aphasic
- Adults seeking transgender-specific voice training, including voice feminization and voice masculinization

== See also ==
- All India Institute of Speech and Hearing (AIIMS)
- Applied linguistics
- Communicative disorders assistant
- List of university speech–language pathology departments
- List of voice disorders
- Motor theory of speech perception
- Neurolinguistics
- Online speech therapy
- Oral myology
- Origin of speech
- Speech acquisition
- Speech Buddies
- Speech perception
- Speech processing
- Speech repetition
