= Speech Buddies =

Speech Buddies are a series of speech therapy tools to remediate articulation and speech sound disorders using the teaching method of tactile feedback. Speech Buddies were created by Articulate Technologies, Inc., in San Francisco, California. Speech Buddies and Speech Buddy are trademarks of Articulate Technologies, Inc. They are FDA-listed medical devices.

There are five different Speech Buddies, each one addressing an individual sound: R, S, L, CH or SH. These tools try to teach the correct tongue placement when trying to produce the sounds.

Preliminary research results from a single-blind randomized controlled trial suggest that they may increase the speed at which a child can learn to correct their speech sound disorder.
