= Ladislav Orosz =

Slovak politician

Member of the National Council
- In office 25 October 1998 – 15 October 2002

Personal details
- Born: 15 April 1959 (age 67) Rožňava, Czechoslovakia
- Party: Party of the Democratic Left
- Children: 2
- Education: Pavol Jozef Šafárik University

Ladislav Orosz (born 15 April 1959) is a Slovak jurist, academic and politician. He served as a Member of the National Council from 1998 to 2002 and a judge of the Constitutional Court of Slovakia between 2007 and 2019.

Orosz was born in Rožňava. He studied law at the Pavol Jozef Šafárik University, graduating in 1982. After graduating, he became professor at the same university. Between 1993 and 1998 he worked as an aide to the President Michal Kováč. Afterwards, he was a professor at the University of Prešov. In 2004, he rejoined the Pavol Jozef Šafárik University. Before becoming a Constitutional Court judge, he was also active as an attorney.

In 1998, Orosz became an MP for the Party of the Democratic Left. In the parliament, he made a major contribution to drafting a major reform to the Slovak constitution. In 2002, after the split of the Party of the Democratic Left, he joined the Social Democratic Alternative, which received less than 2% of the vote at the 2002 Slovak parliamentary election, ending Orosz's political career.

Orosz is married and has two children.
