= International University of Goražde =

- Motto: In the hands of knowledge
- Type: Private
- Established: 2014
- Rector: PhD Sejad Mačkić
- Academic staff: 28
- Administrative staff: 11
- Address: Seada Sofovića Sofe 27, Goražde 73000, Goražde, Bosnia and Herzegovina; 43°40′05″N 18°58′29″E
- Campus: Urban
- Colors: Blue and White
- Website: www.iug.ba
- Location in Bosnia and Herzegovina

The 'International University of Goražde is a private university located in the city of Goražde, Bosnia and Herzegovina. It is open to students from Bosnia and Herzegovina, and all over the Levant and the Middle East. The language of instruction and communication is English. It offers education according to Bologna system ( I. cycle, II. cycle, and III. cycle diplomas).

The university is not an accredited institution and does not issue degrees valid to practice a profession.

The university has local and international students in three faculties and 12 departments performing academic activities in the disciplines of science, engineering, and social sciences. The first generation of students was enrolled in the 2015–2016 academic year.

== Fake degrees ==
The university is at the center of a Bosnia and Herzegovina Busts Fake Diplomas Ring. The university is not an accredited institution and does not issue degrees that can be used to practice a profession. The former rector and his collaborators have been arrested.

== University administration ==
The rector, PhD Sejad Mačkić.

== Organization ==
The International University of Goražde comprises:

- Faculty of Social Sciences (Department of Law, Business Economy, Banking, and Management)
- Faculty of Technical Sciences (Department of Architecture, Civil Engineering, Survey, and Electrical Engineering)
- Faculty of Medical Sciences (Department of General Medicine, Stomatology, Pharmacy, Medical Nursery, and Physiotherapy)
- Faculty of Educational Sciences (Department of Psychology, Turkish Language and Literature)

== Student activities ==
Students have been involved in various activities.

== Campus ==
The university has a plan to build a modern urban campus in the city of Goražde in the near future.
