= Gaziantep Islam Science and Technology University =

Public university in Gaziantep, Turkey

- Gaziantep İslam Bilim ve Teknoloji Üniversitesi
- Type: Public
- Established: May 18, 2018
- Rector: Şehmus Demir
- Location: Gaziantep, Turkey; 36.979°N 37.300°E
- Language: Turkish, Arabic
- Colors
- Website: www.gibtu.edu.tr

Gaziantep Islam Science and Technology University (GISTU) (Turkish: Gaziantep İslam Bilim ve Teknoloji Üniversitesi, GİBTÜ) is a public university in Gaziantep, Turkey. It was established on the campus of Zirve University, which had closed in 2016.

Its vision is to be a higher education institution that protects and develops the religious and spiritual structure, and ensures the training of specialized personnel for the performance of religious activities.

Nihat Hatipoğlu was appointed as the rector of Gaziantep Islam Science and Technology University by decision of President Recep Tayyip Erdoğan on 18 January 2019.
