= Faculty of Medicine, Pavol Jozef Šafárik University =

Medical school in Košice, Slovakia

Coordinates: 48°43′23″N 21°14′13″E

- Lekárska fakulta Univerzity Pavla Jozefa Šafárika v Košiciach
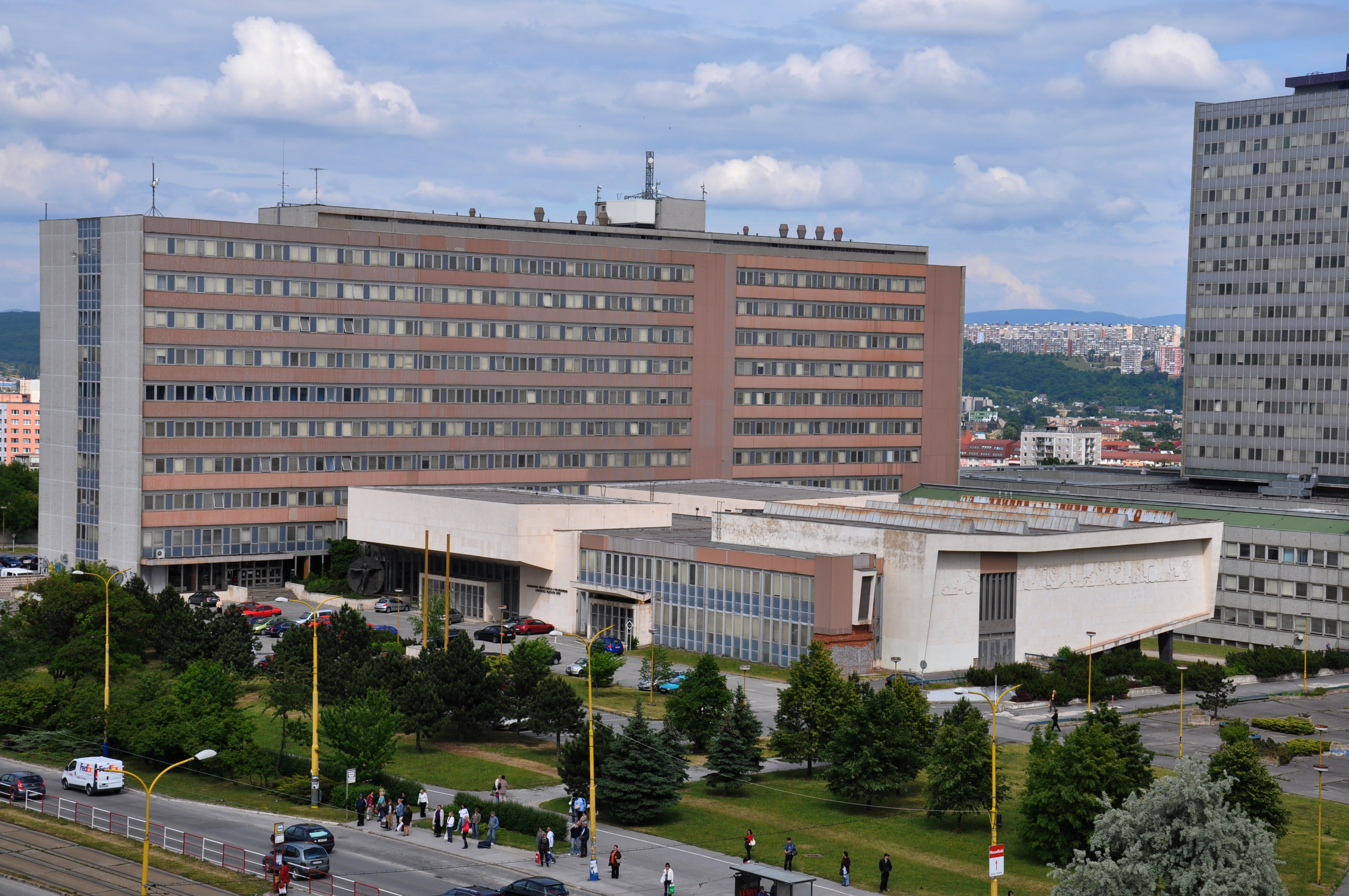
- Type: Public
- Established: 1948
- Location: Košice, Slovakia
- Website: Official website

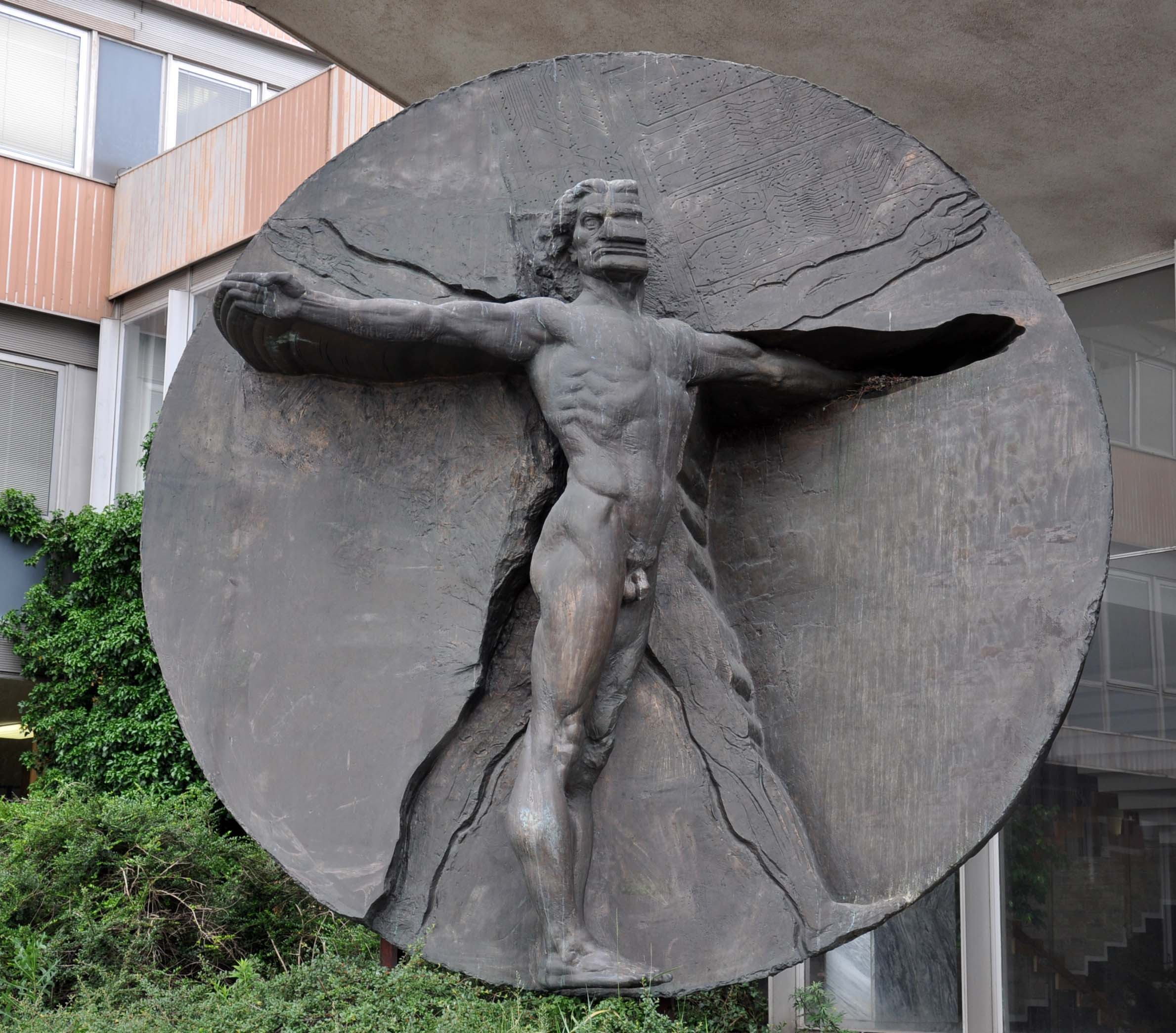
Statue at the Entrance to Faculty of Medicine in Košice

The Faculty of Medicine of Pavol Jozef Šafárik University is an educational and scientific institution in Košice offering tertiary education in doctoral studies and public health programmes. The Faculty of Medicine is the oldest institution of Pavol Jozef Šafárik University and was founded in 1948, 11 years before the establishment of University.

== Study programmes ==
Faculty of Medicine provides doctoral studies in the study programmes of General Medicine and Dental Medicine, as well as undergraduate and graduate studies in the study programs of nursing, physiotherapy and public health and doctoral studies. In the academic year 2014/2015, almost 500 students started the first year of general medicine, dental medicine, physiotherapy and public health, taught in Slovak and English.

== History ==
The Faculty of Medicine at Pavol Jozef Šafárik University in Košice is an institution with over 65 years long history. Faculty was founded in September 1948 and nowadays has over 12 thousand graduates. Since 1992, the Faculty has been offering medical studies in the English language to international students. The number of international students grows rapidly; there were 899 international students in 2015.

== Organisational structure ==
The Faculty runs under ECTS (European Credit Transfer and Accumulation System) grading scheme and is involved in international cooperation with other educational institutions worldwide.

The Faculty of Medicine in Košice consists of 60 units – institutes, departments, scientific research and experimental workplaces, and special-purpose facilities. The Faculty is located close to the L. Pasteur University Hospital, where students take the bulk of their practical training. Its teaching base represents a total of 11 medical institutions that allow students direct contact with patients and employment of modern treatment methods. The Faculty of Medicine in Kosice has been rewarded as the second-best medical faculty in Slovakia.

== International cooperation ==
Faculty of Medicine in Košice is involved in international cooperation with other educational institutions within programme Erasmus+. Cooperation faculties are from all over the Europe. Faculty is also taking part in various international conferences, such as International Student Medical Congress Košice 2015, which was attended by more than 150 medical students.
