= Istanbul Health and Technology University =

University in Istanbul, Turkey

- İstanbul Sağlık ve Teknoloji Üniversitesi
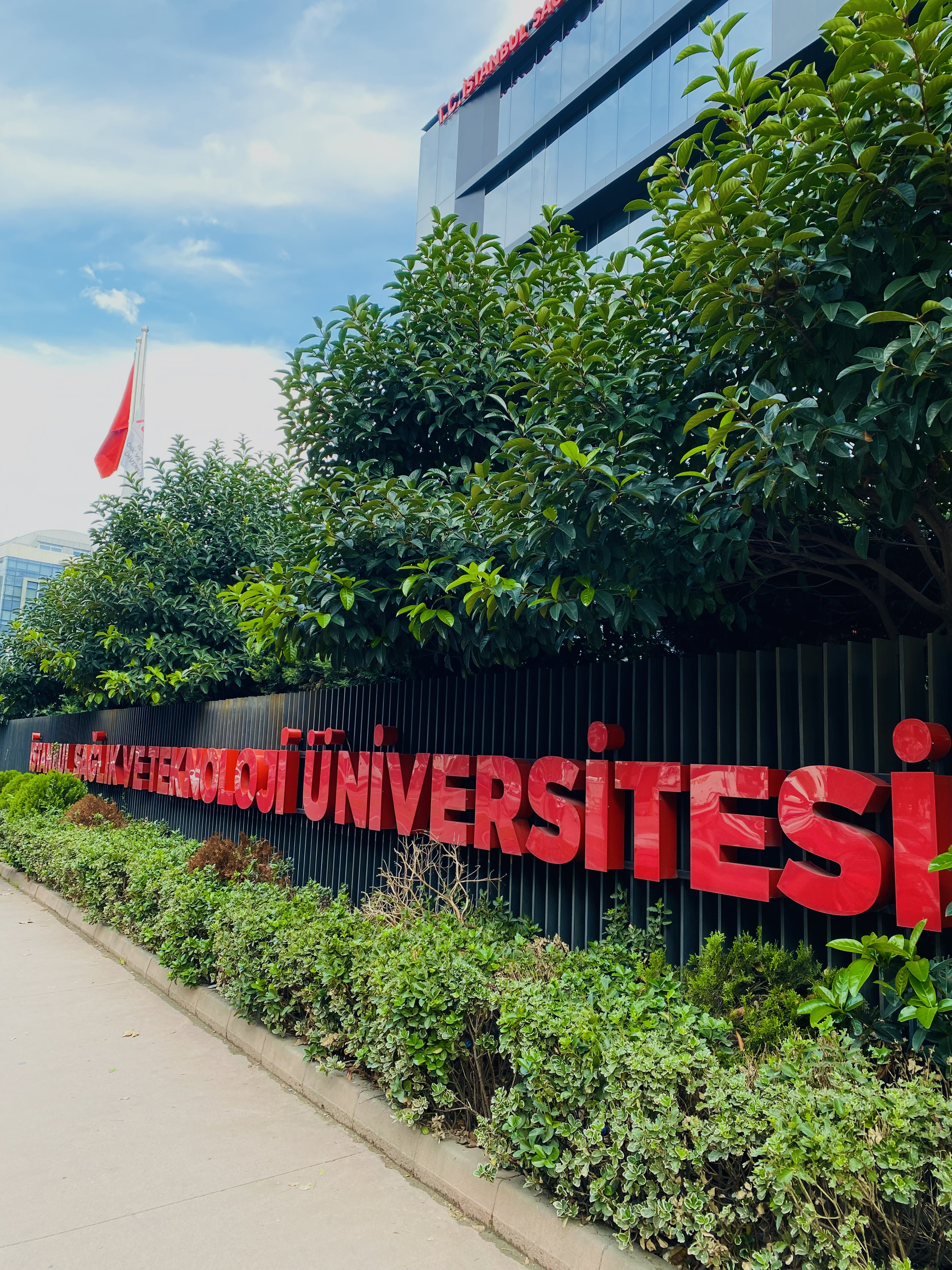
- University entrance
- Motto: İSTÜN'de geleceğin var!
- Type: Foundation
- Established: May 9, 2018
- Affiliations: Bilgiç Vakfı
- Rector: Prof. Dr. Buğra Özen
- Students: 2.293(Active)
- Location: Turkey, Istanbul; 41°03′23″N 28°57′04″E
- Colors: Red-White
- Website: www.istun.edu.tr
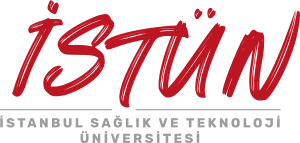

- Location within Turkey

Istanbul Health and Technology University, was established by Neutec, Bilgiç Foundation and took its place in higher education to start its activities in the 2020-2021 academic year as a foundation university that gained public legal personality with "Additional Article 196 (Additional: 9/5/2018-7141/7 md)", "Article 13 of the law dated 25/3/2020 and numbered 7226" with its publication in the Official Gazette.

Istanbul Health and Technology University started its education life with Topkapı Campus in Zeytinburnu. In the second academic year, it opened Merter Campus and provided education in two campuses until the 2023-2024 academic year. Since the 2023-2024 academic year, it continues its education at Sütlüce Campus. On 3 January 2024, with the handover ceremony held on 3 January 2024, the founding rector Prof. Dr. Seyhan Alkan handed over his duty to Prof. Dr. Buğra Özen, who was appointed instead.

== Campus ==
Istanbul Health and Technology University has been providing education at its campus in Sütlüce since the 2023-2024 academic year. Previously, education was provided at Topkapı and Merter Campuses. It was announced to the students that Topkapı Campus will be transformed into a medical centre for medical students.

The campus consists of 2 buildings divided into 3 blocks. While block A consists of a single building, blocks B and C are separated by a terrace within the same building.

The campus is located on the Golden Horn.

== Academic units ==
=== Faculties ===
- Faculty of Engineering and Natural Sciences
- Faculty of Medicine
- Faculty of Dentistry
- Faculty of Pharmacy
- Faculty of Health Sciences
  - Physiotherapy and Rehabilitation
  - Nutrition and Dietetics
  - Nursing
  - Audiology
  - Occupational Therapy

=== Vocational school ===
As of the 2022–23 academic year, all departments except the Department of Oral and Dental Health have been closed. However, the closed departments still host students. No statement has yet been made about whether the closed departments will be opened.

- Medical Laboratory Techniques (Closed)
- First and Emergency Aid (Closed)
- Medical Imaging Techniques (Closed)
- Anaesthesia (Closed)
- Oral and Dental Health (Active)

== Gallery ==
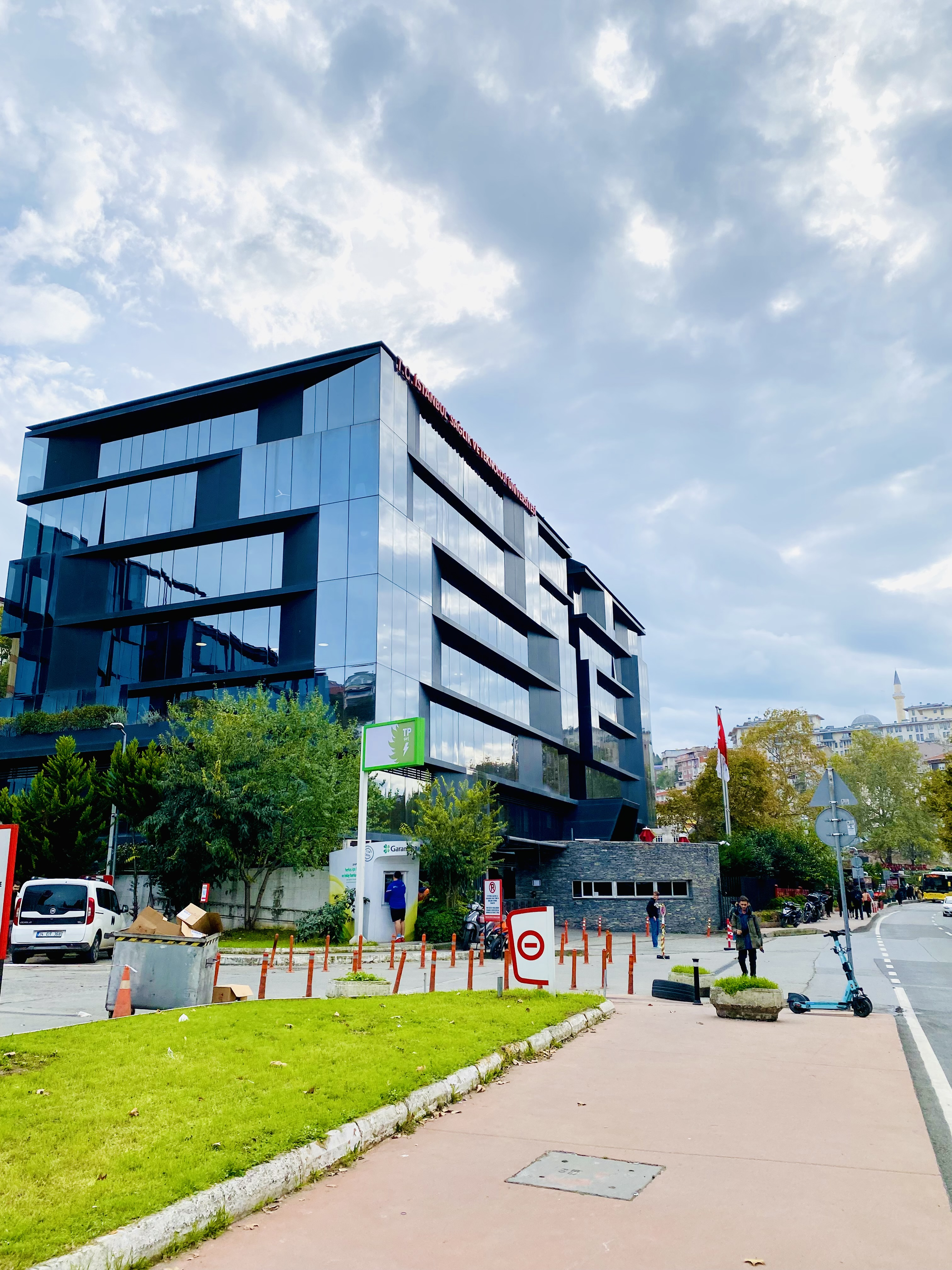
Block A

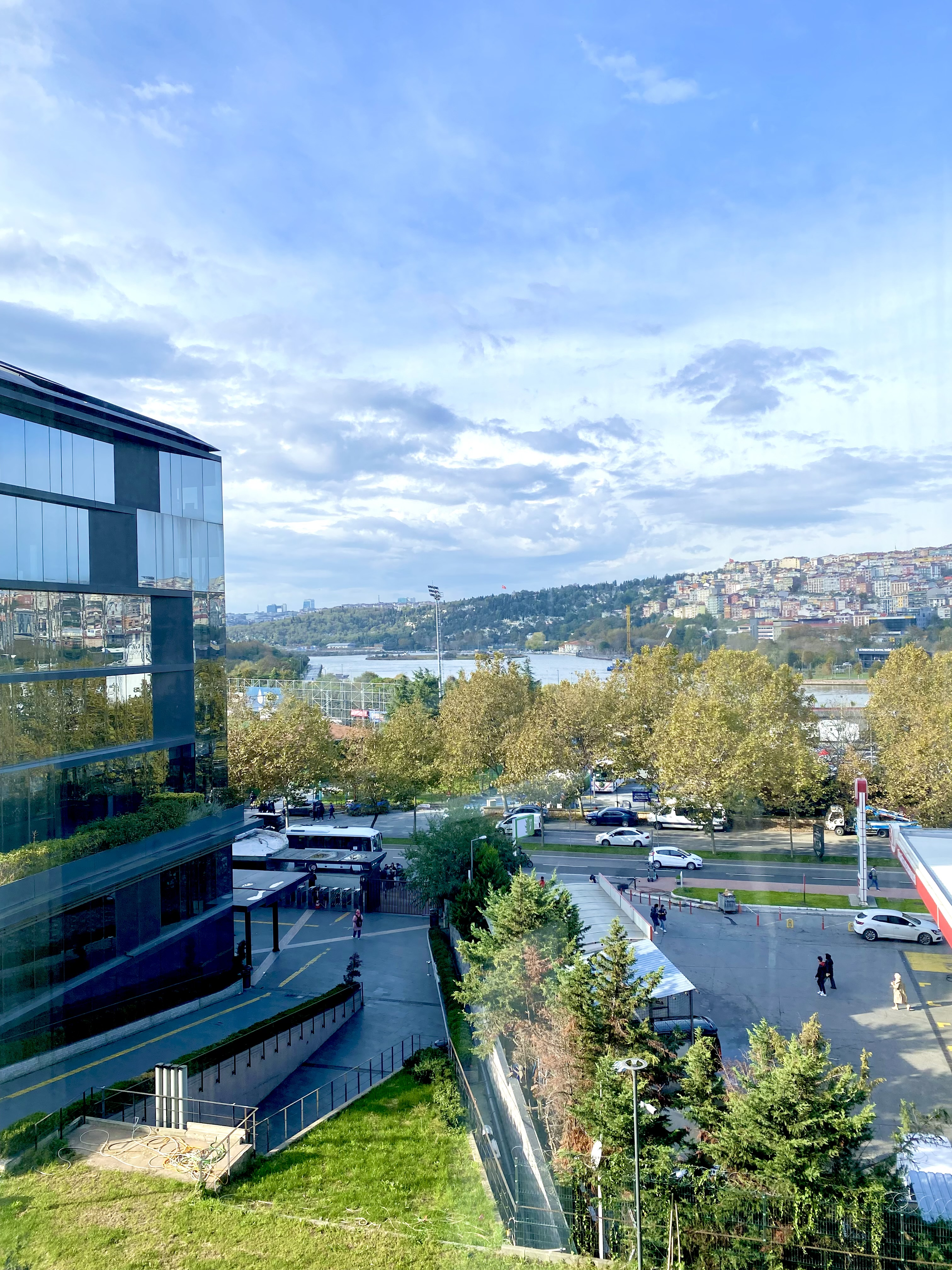
Golden Horn view from the University

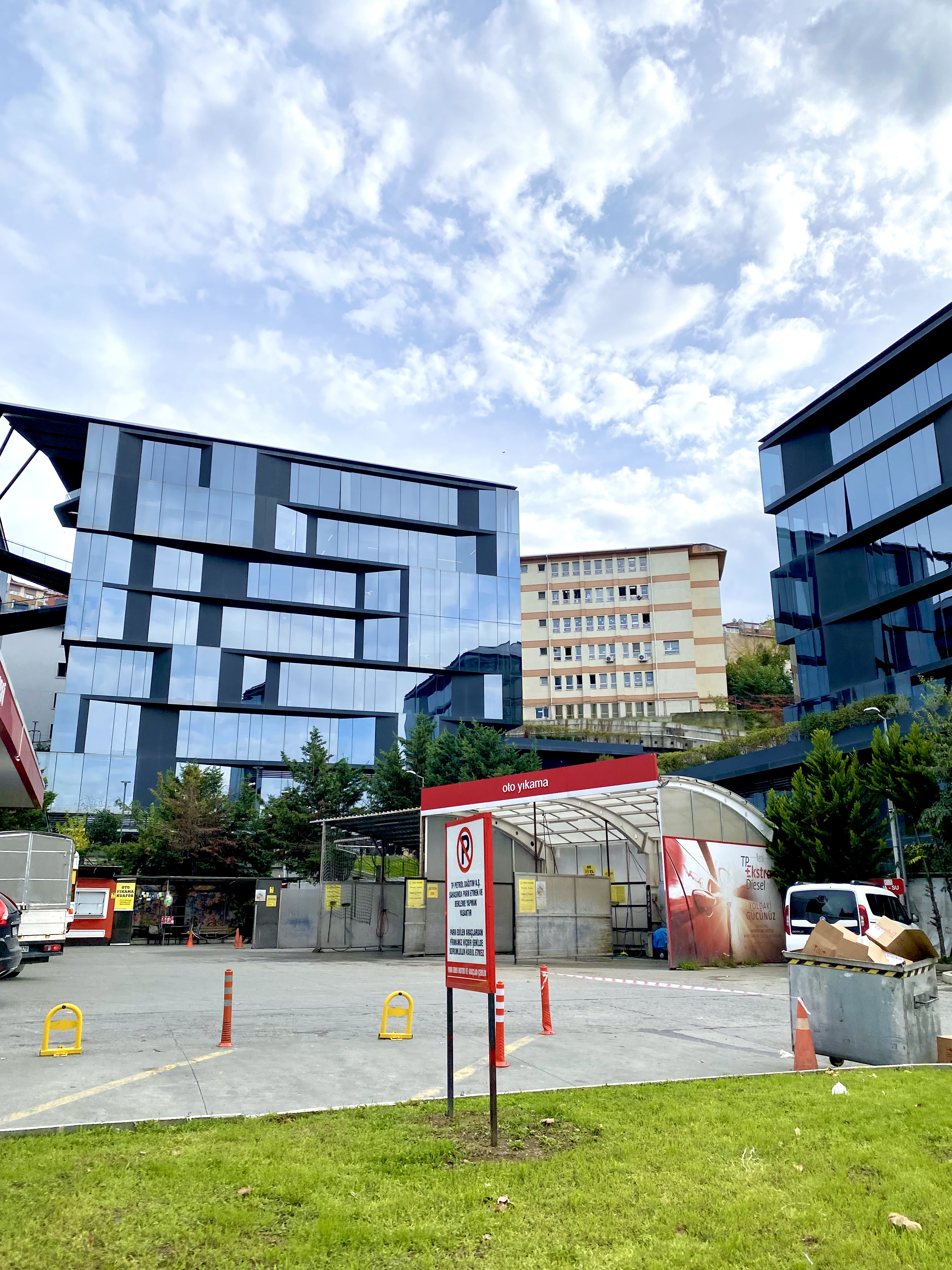
Block C

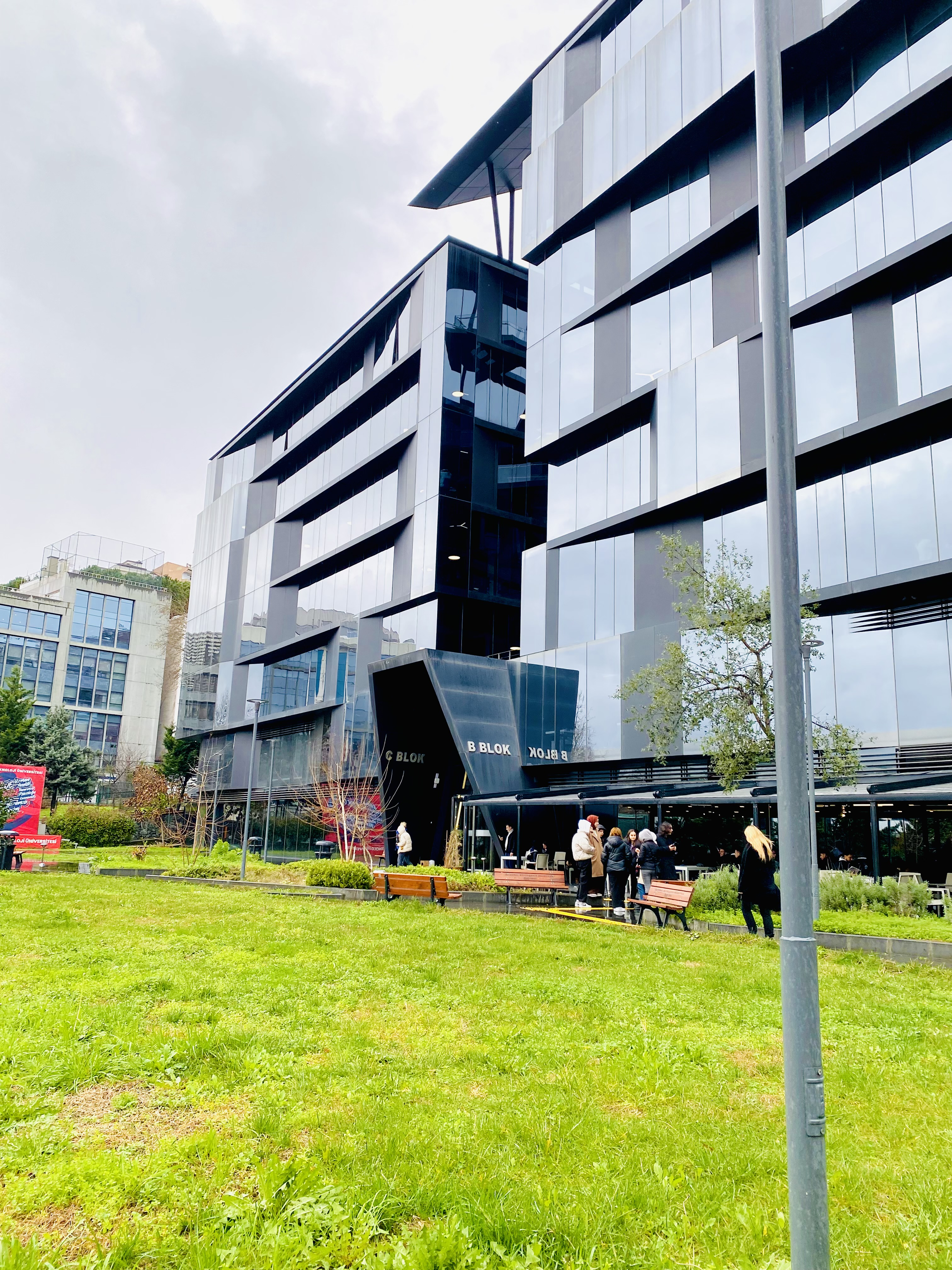
Block B

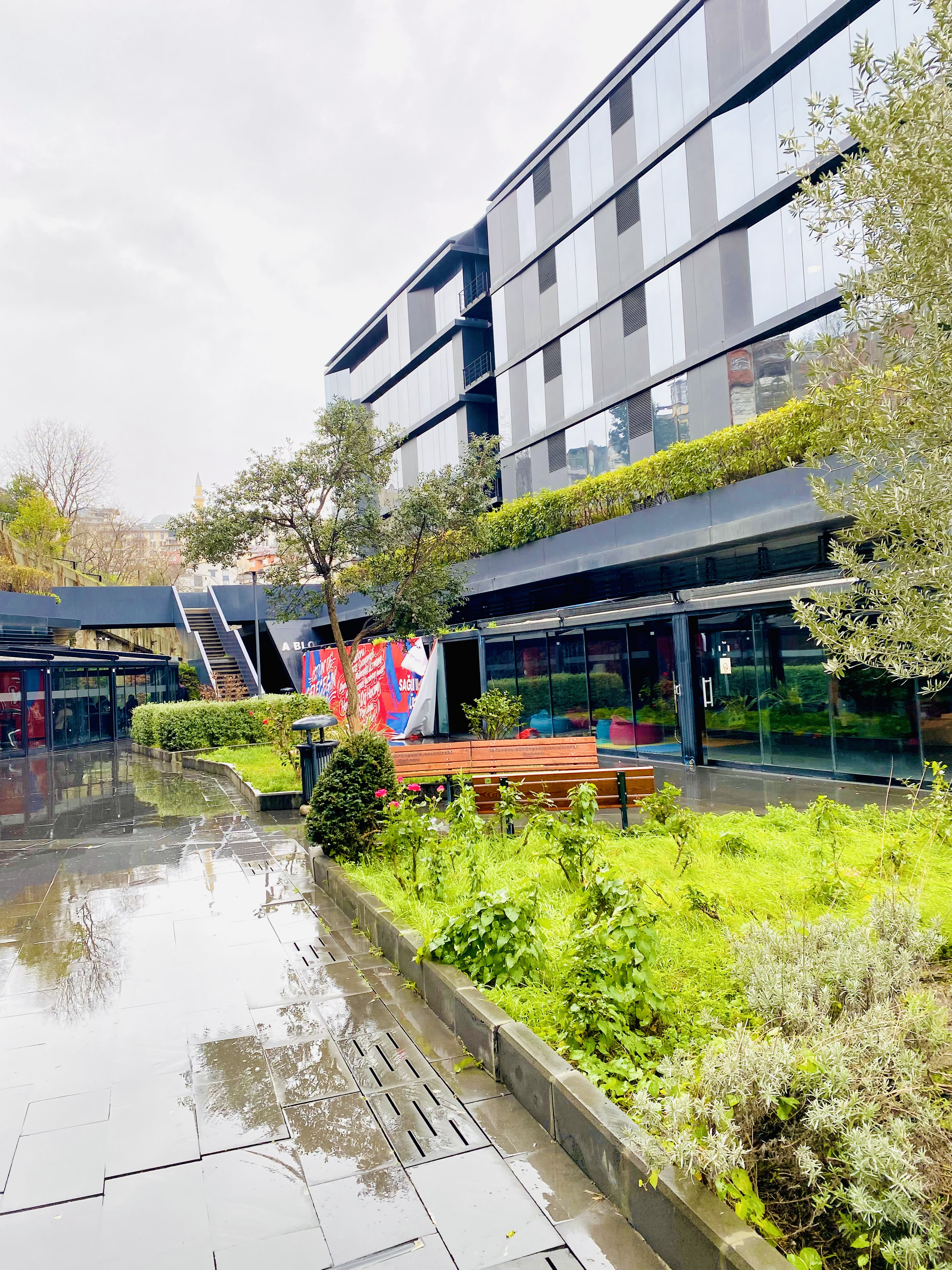
Cafés section

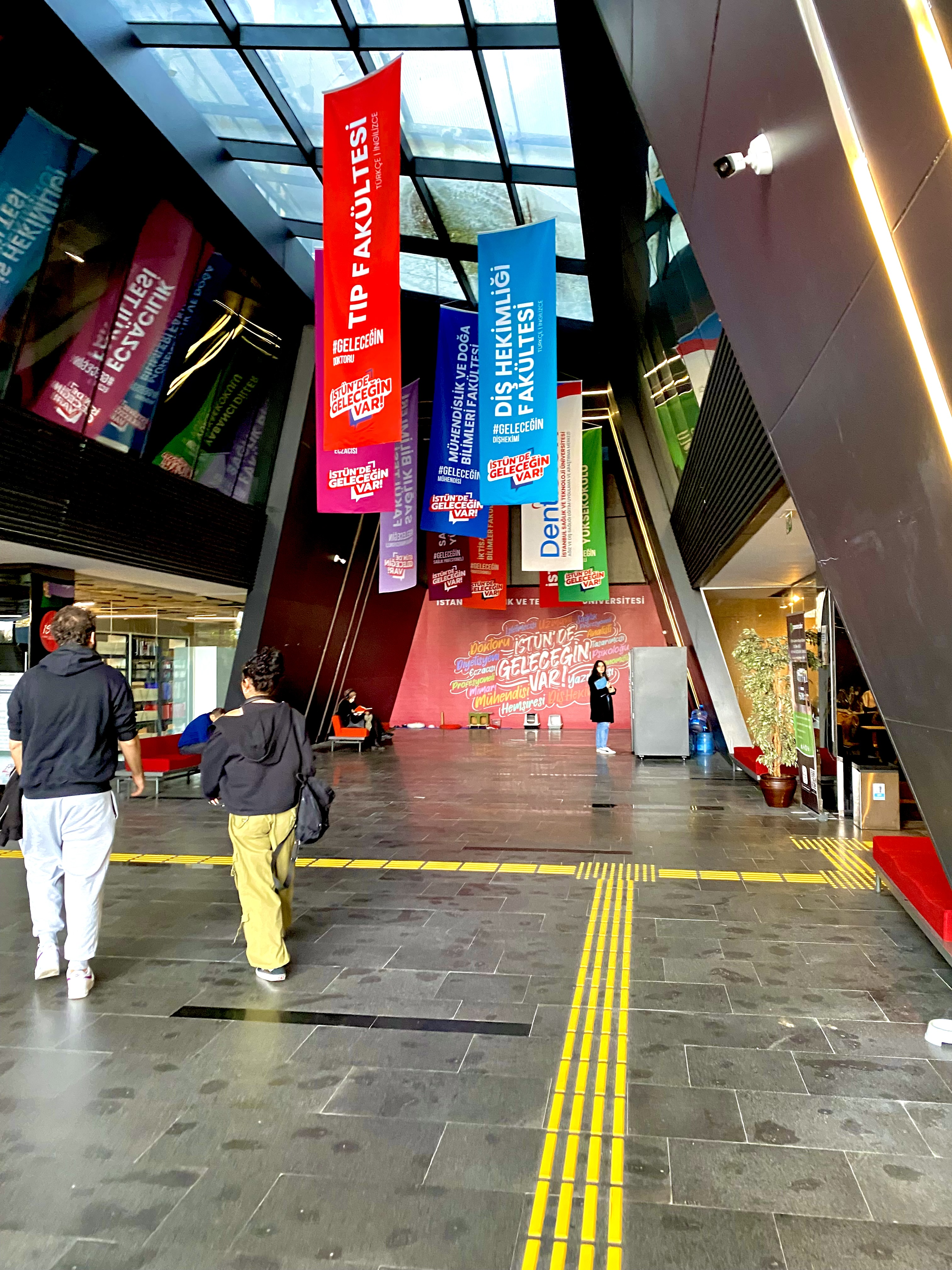
C block entrance

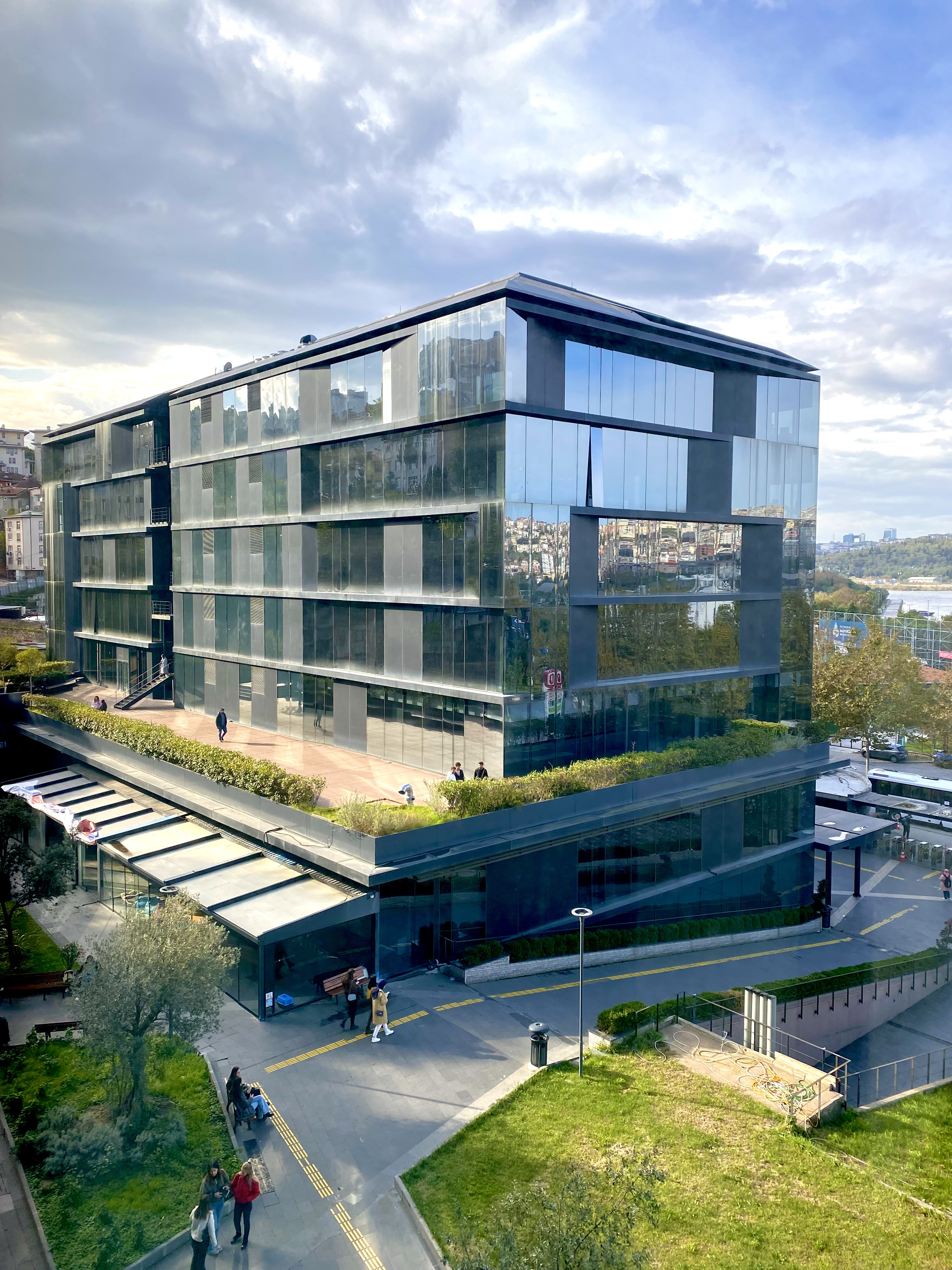
Campus garden
