= Izhevsk State Medical Academy =

Medical school in Izhevsk, Russia

Coordinates: 56°51′02″N 53°12′57″E

- Russian: Ижевская государственная медицинская академия
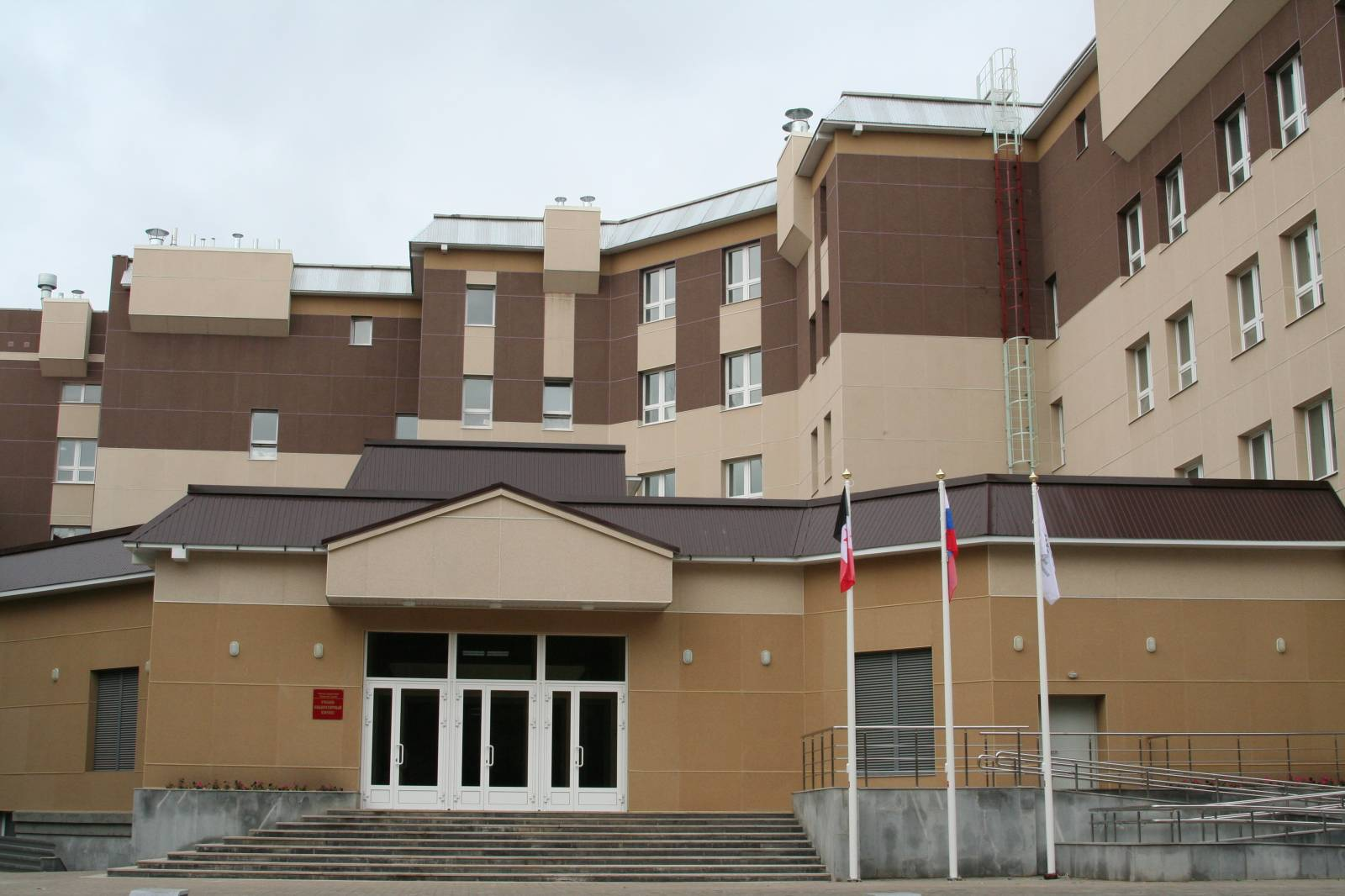
- Former names: Izhevsk State Medical Institute
- Type: public
- Established: 1933
- Rector: Aleksey Shklyaev
- Students: 4,000
- Location: 281 Kommunarov Street, Izhevsk, Udmurt Republic, Russia
- Campus: urban
- Website: www.igma.ru

The Izhevsk State Medical Academy (ISMA; Russian: Ижевская государственная медицинская академия, ИГМА) is a public higher medical school in Izhevsk, Russia. The academy is an institution of Russia in medicine and training specialists in preventive and clinical medicine.

== History ==
After the October Revolution and the Russian Civil War, because of outbreaks of anthrax and cholera in the Ural and Volga Regions, there was the urgent need in medical staff. In 1933, due the Resolution of the Soviets the Izhevsk State Medical Institute was established. The medical scientist Vasily Parin was one of its founders.

In August 1933, 171 students were enrolled in the first year of the General Medicine Department of the institute. In 1938, the first graduation of doctors took place, and most of them were sent to work in medical organisations of Udmurtia. In the years of the Great Patriotic War, the most of graduate doctors were sent to the frontline and rear hospitals. After the war, the Paediatrics Department (1975) and the Dentistry Department (1980) were opened at the institute.

== Education ==
In the academy the education process is organized at four departments:

- General Medicine Department,
- Paediatrics Department,
- Dentistry Department,
- Department of Post-graduate and Professional Training.

Students are trained in the specialties of medical care, pediatrics and dentistry. Post-graduate and professional training is carried out in internship, residency and Ph.D. degree studies.

Since 2008, the academy has been publishing a journal in the Russian and English languages titled "Health, Demography, Ecology of Finno-Ugric Peoples" (Russian: Здоровье, демография, экология финно-угорских народов — ISSN 1994-8921).
