= Kütahya Health Sciences University =

Public university in Kütahya, Turkey

- Kütahya Sağlık Bilimleri Üniversitesi
- Type: Public
- Established: May 18, 2018
- Rector: Ahmet Tekin
- Location: Kütahya, Turkey; 39°29′16″N 29°53′09″E
- Website: ksbu.edu.tr

Kütahya Health Sciences University (Turkish: Kütahya Sağlık Bilimleri Üniversitesi) is a public university in Kütahya, Turkey. It was established on May 18, 2018, as a health-themed university, separated from Kütahya Dumlupınar University.

== Academic units ==
=== Faculties ===
==== Faculty of Medicine ====
- Department of Surgical Medical Sciences
- Department of Internal Medicine
- Department of Basic Medical Sciences

==== Faculty of Dentistry ====
- Oral and Maxillofacial Surgery
- Oral and Maxillofacial Radiology
- Endodontics
- Pedodontics (Pediatric Dentistry)
- Periodontology
- Prosthodontics
- Restorative Dentistry
- Orthodontics

==== Faculty of Health Sciences ====
- Nutrition and Dietetics
- Speech and Language Therapy
- Midwifery
- Occupational Therapy
- Physiotherapy and Rehabilitation
- Nursing
- Health Management
- Social Work

==== Faculty of Engineering and Natural Sciences ====
- Computer Engineering
- Molecular Biology and Genetics

=== Vocational Schools ===
- Tavşanlı Vocational School of Health Services
- Simav Vocational School of Health Services
- Kütahya Vocational School
- Gediz Vocational School of Health Services

=== Institutes ===
- Institute of Graduate Studies
