= Biruni University =

Private university in Istanbul, Turkey

- Biruni Üniversitesi
- President: Bahar Sema Yüksel
- Vice-Chancellor: Mustafa Solak Sevim Savaşer Fatma Çelik
- Location: Istanbul, Turkey
- Campus: Urban
- Language: Turkish, English
- Colors: Turquoise, navy blue and orange
- Mascot: Astrolabe
- Website: biruni.edu.tr

Biruni University (Turkish: Biruni Üniversitesi) is a university established in Istanbul, Turkey in 2014 by the World Education Foundation. Classes are taught in Turkish and English.

== Student clubs/groups ==
The university has 8 scientific clubs, 23 professional clubs, and 36 social clubs.
