= St. Theresa's Medical University of Yerevan =

Private university in Mastos, Yerevan, Armenia,

St. Theresa's Medical University of Yerevan (also known as St. Theresa Charitable Sisters Medical Institute) is a private school in Yerevan, Armenia, established in 1992. It is ranked 10th among private medical schools in Armenia, and graduates possess certified specialist qualifications.

It is the only institute in Armenia that participates in the international market of physician placement.
