= All India Institute of Speech and Hearing =

Autonomous institute in India

- ಅಖಿಲ ಭಾರತ ವಾಕ್ ಮತ್ತು ಶ್ರವಣ ಸಂಸ್ಥೆ

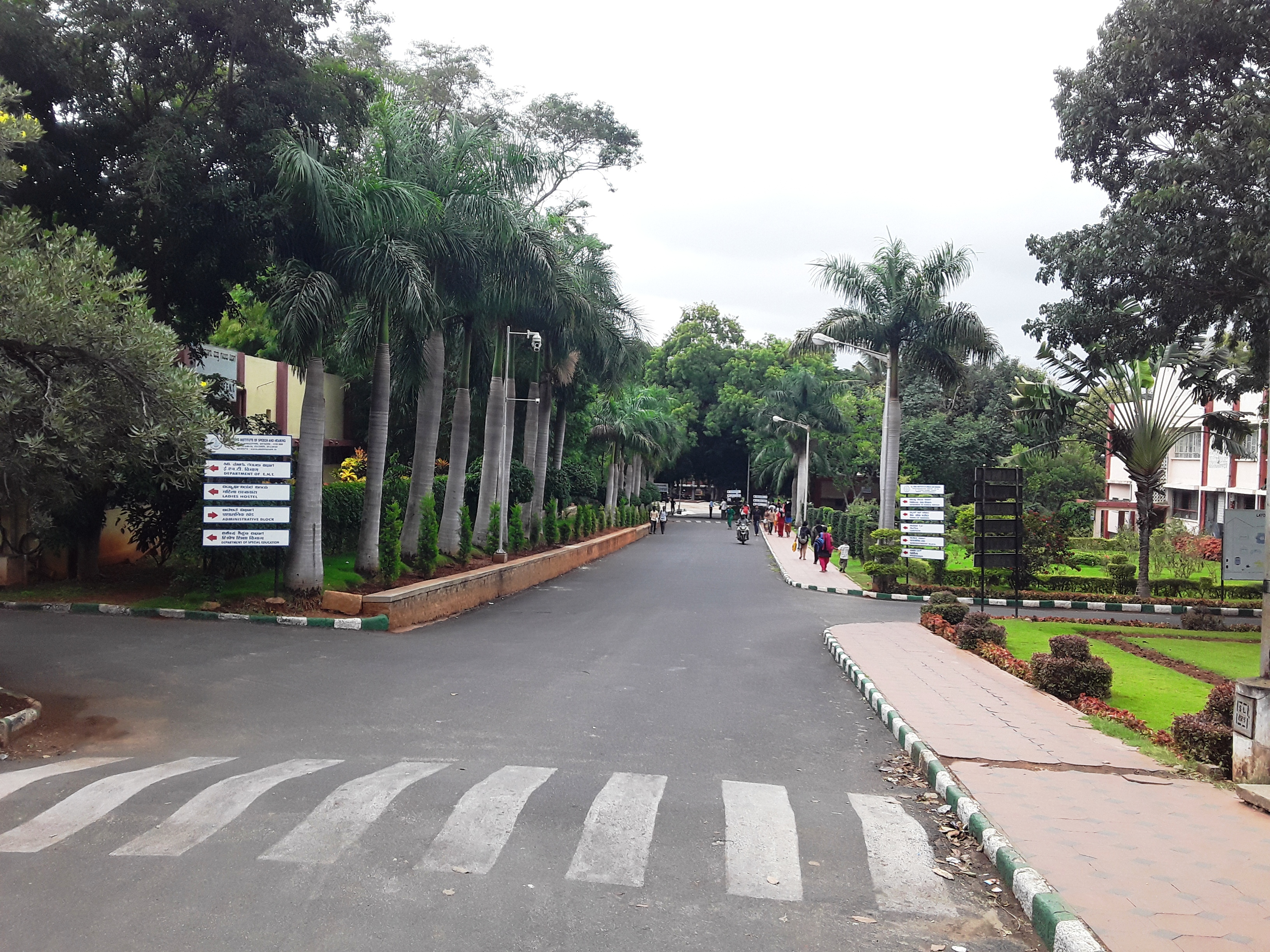
- Speech and Hearing Institute, Manasagangotri, Mysore.

Location
- Naimisham Campus, Road No.3, T K Layout, Manasagangothri; Mysuru, Karnataka 570006; India; 12.3091°N 76.6165°E

Information
- Other name: AIISH
- Established: 1966; 60 years ago
- Website: aiishmysore.in

The All India Institute of Speech and Hearing, commonly known as AIISH (AYE-SH), is located in Manasagangotri (Mysore University Campus), Mysore, India. It is an autonomous institute under the Ministry of Health and Family Welfare. The institute was established in 1966 with a focus on training professionals for speech and hearing sciences.

== Overview ==
AIISH is a National Institute offering clinical, academic and research activities for the communication impaired. It's an autonomous institute under the Ministry of Health and Family Welfare, India. AIISH is affiliated to the University of Mysore and offers undergraduate, graduate, and doctoral degrees in Speech and Hearing. It offers the following courses:

AIISH also conducts research in speech-language pathology, audiology, speech sciences, and hearing sciences. Some of the current research activities focus on early identification and genetics of hearing impairment, effectiveness of intervention strategies, development of assessment materials for Indian languages, and speech speaker recognition. It has developed normative data for speech and language acquisition in children for various Indian languages and established a research fund from which small grants are awarded to specialists working in fields such as neurology, genetics, epidemiology, linguistics, otolaryngology, clinical psychology and pediatrics. It also publishes a yearly scholarly journal

AIISH has been recognized as a center of excellence in the area of deafness by World Health Organization (WHO). It has also received recognition from the University Grants Commission (UGC) as a center for advanced research and from the Department of Science & Technology (DST) as a Science and Technology Institute.

AIISH provides clinical services for speech, language, and hearing disorders through its clinical service program. The therapy clinic provides assessment and intervention services, for variety of speech, language, and hearing disorders, to individuals of all ages. It also offers public education programs and conducts workshops for speech-language pathologists, audiologists, educators for the hearing impaired, medical, and allied health professionals.

== See also ==
- Speech-language Pathology
- All India Institute of Medical Sciences Delhi
