= Pavol Jozef Šafárik University =

University in Košice, Slovakia

Coordinates: 48°43′09″N 21°15′04″E

Pavol Jozef Šafárik University in Košice
- Univerzita Pavla Jozefa Šafárika v Košiciach
- Type: Public
- Established: 1959
- Chancellor: Mgr. Lucia Huličová
- Rector: prof. MUDr. Daniel Pella, PhD.
- Administrative staff: 1,250
- Students: 5,700
- Location: Košice, Slovakia
- Website: www.upjs.sk

University rankings

Regional – Overall
- QS Emerging Europe and Central Asia: 126 (2022)

Pavol Jozef Šafárik University in Košice (Slovak Univerzita Pavla Jozefa Šafárika v Košiciach) is a university located in Košice, Slovakia. It was founded in 1959 and is organized into five faculties. The university is named after Pavel Jozef Šafárik, a 19th-century Slovak philologist, poet, and historian.

== History ==
The tradition of higher education in Košice goes back to the year 1657, when the bishop Benedict Kishdy founded an Academy by the Memorandum of "Studium Universale" and endowed it with 40,000 thalers. The Academy or the university started up managed by the Society of Jesus. The University of Košice Golden Bull issued on 6 August 1660 by the Roman emperor Leopold I granted the University the same privileges as to all the other universities of the Habsburg Monarchy in Vienna, Prague, Köln, Graz, Trnava, Olomouc e.g. The Bull included a provision of high significance stating the academic degrees to be recognized as they were granted at any of the oldest and most famous universities. The structure of the Academia Cassoviensis was similar to that of other universities managed by Jesuits, determined by the study rules, the Ratio Studiorum. Rector, Vice-rector and Chancellor stood at the head of the university, Faculties were represented by Deans. Alongside the Philosophical and the Law Faculties, the Theological Faculty was the strongest. Study at the Philosophical Faculty was dedicated first of all to Philosophy, History and Languages, but the lectures included also natural sciences, e.g. Physics, Mathematics, Geography and Botany. The Košice University was well known for its excellent professors Martin Palkovič, Samuel Timon, Štefan Kaprinai, Karol Wágner, Juraj Sklenár, Michal Lipšic, distinguished for dissemination of the new Physics in the Monarchy, and others. Regular and extraordinary professors were giving lectures to the students of all the Hungary nationalities. The lectures were given in Latin. The university had its own library, church, printing station and it was also connected to other institutions, a high school, seminary and convict or to vassal villages and other estate administration, for instance. The university was in possession of more villages in Spiš County, at Abov and Zemplín See; it owned also one of the Gemer county towns, Jelšava. The university significantly influenced the advancement of science, educational attainment and spiritual culture in the 17th and 18th century.

In 1773 the University fell out of the conduct of the Jesuits and became a public institution, Academia Regia. Following the government's Ratio Educationis, it lost its sovereignty and remained just a subsidiary of the only Hungarian University in Buda while keeping the right to grant a degree. In 1850 Academia Regia transformed into the Law Academy, which existed till the year 1921.

Founding the Dr. Milan Rastislav Štefánik Technical University made Košice a seat of university, again, though it was cancelled by the law in 1939.

After the Second World War, in successive steps, following universities were established: University of Agriculture and Horticulture, subsidiary of the Pedagogical Faculty of the Slovak University in 1947, in 1948 it was a subsidiary of the Medicine Faculty of Comenius University, University of Veterinary Medicine in 1949 and in 1952 Technical University.

By joining the subsidiary of the Medicine Faculty of Comenius University with the Philosophical Faculty accrued from the Philosophical Faculty of the Pedagogical College in Prešov, Pavol Jozef Šafárik University in Košice was established, which fastened onto the tradition of the historical Jesuitical Košice University.

In 1964 the Pedagogical Faculty with a seat in Prešov was established and became a part of P. J. Šafárik University, as well as the Faculty of Science in 1963 and the Faculty of Law in 1973. The number of faculties increased by the Orthodox Theologian Faculty and the Greek-catholic Theologian Faculty; on 1 January 1997 the P. J. Šafárik University was divided into two independent Universities, P. J. Šafárik University in Košice and University of Prešov in Prešov. So, the number of the faculties was reduced to 3, which were the Faculty of Medicine, the Faculty of Science and the Faculty of Law. From the year 1998 the university has also a new Faculty of Public Administration.

=== Predecessors of P. J. Šafárik University ===
- 1657 – beginning of university education in Košice; foundation of Academia Cassoviensis by Benedikt Kishdy, bishop of Eger.
- 1660 – Golden Bull awarded by Leopold I, which gave the University and the city the same privileges as for instance, Cologne, Vienna, Graz and others.
- 1777 – the bishop's Alma Mater Universalis Episcopalis was transformed to Academia regia Cassoviensis as two-year Law Faculty with philosophical orientation.
- 1921 – the university ceased to exist for 38 years.

=== P. J. Šafárik University in 1959–1999 ===
- 1959 – old University traditions were renewed by foundation of Pavol Jozef Šafárik University in Košice which consisted of Faculty of Medicine in Košice and Faculty of Philosophy in Prešov (Faculty of Medicine existed since 1949 as a part of Comenius University in Bratislava).

The new University was enlarged by new faculties:

- 1963 – Faculty of Science in Košice
- 1964 – Faculty of Education in Prešov
- 1973 – Faculty of Law in Košice

In 1990, two new faculties were established: Greek-Catholic Theologian Faculty in Prešov and Orthodox Theologian Faculty in Prešov.

In 1997, after difficult discussions at the University and in the Parliament of the Slovak Republic, the university split into two independent universities: P. J. Šafárik University in Košice and University of Prešov in Prešov. P. J. Šafárik University in Košice consisted of three faculties: Faculty of Medicine, Faculty of Science and Faculty of Law.

In 1998, a new Faculty of Public Administration was founded as a part of P. J. Šafárik University.

In 1999, the Faculty of Science opened an educational unit in the city of Rožňava, in the mine region near the birthplace of P. J. Šafárik.

== Organization ==
These are the 5 faculties in which the university is divided into:

- Faculty of Medicine
- Faculty of Science
- Faculty of Law
- Faculty of Public Administration
- Faculty of Arts (since January 2007)

== Notable alumni ==
- Ladislav Orosz

== See also ==
- List of colleges and universities
- List of early modern universities in Europe
