= European Brain Council =

Coordinating international health organization founded in 2002

European Brain Council (EBC)
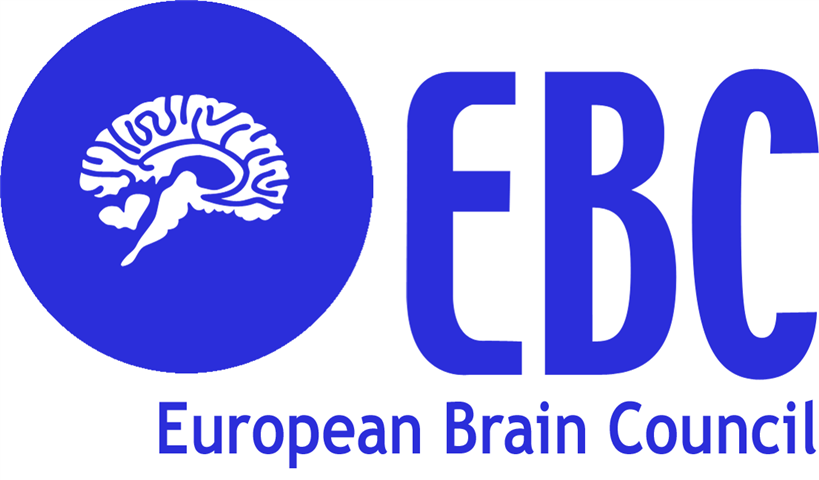
- EBC Logo
- Formation: 2002
- Type: Non-Governmental Organization (NGO)
- Legal status: ASBL
- Headquarters: Brussels, Belgium
- President: Wolfgang H. Oertel
- Key people: Vice Presidents: Wolfgang Gaebel, Juan Lerma
- Website: www.braincouncil.eu

The European Brain Council (EBC) is a coordinating international health organization founded in 2002. It comprises major organisations in the field of brain research and brain disorders in Europe, and thus its structure involves a network of patients, scientists and doctors, working in partnership with the pharmaceutical and medical devices industries. The EBC works with decision-making bodies such as the European Commission, the European Parliament and the World Health Organization.

== Membership ==
=== Patient organisations ===
- European Federation of Neurological Associations
- GAMIAN-Europe (Global Alliance of Mental Illness Advocacy Networks-Europe)

=== Scientific members ===
- European Academy of Neurology
- European Federation of Neurological Societies
- European College of Neuropsychopharmacology
- European Psychiatric Association
- Federation of European Neuroscience Societies
- Pan European Regional Committee of the International Brain Research Organization
