= Olivier Uwishema =

Global health researcher

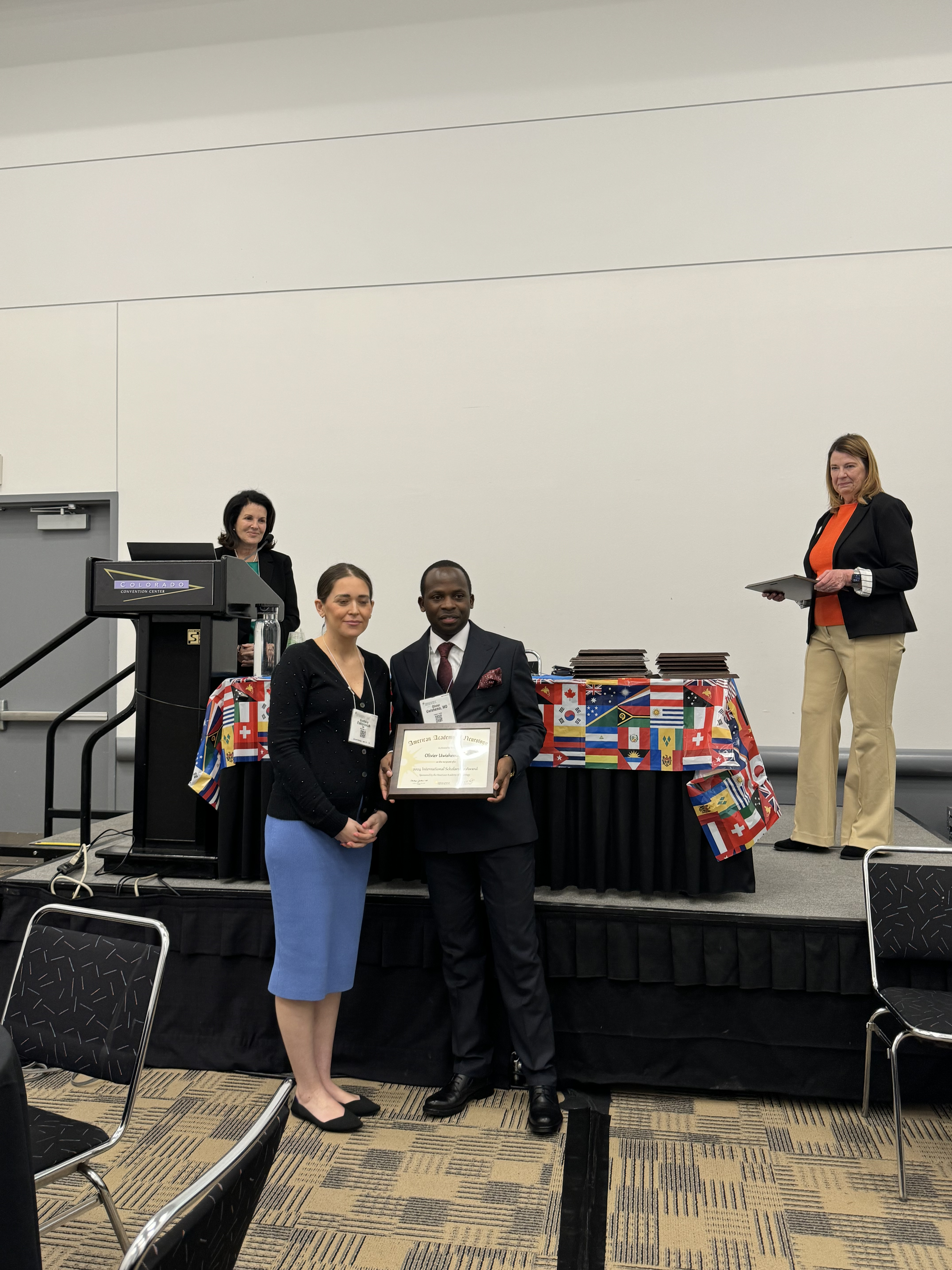
- Olivier in 2024 holding an award from the AAN
- Born: Kigali, Rwanda
- Occupations: Global neurology and Global health researcher
- Years active: 2019– present
- Organization(s): Oli Health Magazine Organization, OHMO Global Research Fellowship
- Known for: Global neurology and global health research; founder of Oli Health Magazine Organization (OHMO)
- Awards: Forbes 30 Under 30 in Medicine and Research; Diana Award; American Academy of Neurology H. Richard Tyler Award; American Academy of Neurology International Scholar Award; Society for Neuro-Oncology International Scholar Award

Olivier Uwishema is a Rwandan global neurology and global health researcher, as well as an advocate for global neurology. He is ranked in the Stanford–Elsevier Global Ranking among the world’s top 2% most influential researchers and scientists. He was named to the Forbes 30 Under 30 list in the Medicine and Research category in 2023 and received the Diana Award in 2024. He is the founder of the Oli Health Magazine Organization (OHMO), a non-profit scientific research organization established in 2018 with the mission of empowering young people worldwide through professional health education and scientific research. During the COVID-19 crisis, Olivier, in collaboration with Harvard Medical School students, helped to translate and distribute vital COVID-19 information in 26 languages.

== Early life and education ==
Olivier was born and studied his elementary education in Rwanda. He excelled high school studies in Physics, Chemistry, and Biology combination. As a result, he was awarded the presidential medical scholarship to attend medical school in Turkey.

== Activities ==
Olivier's research projects have received different grant awards from international institutions such as American Academy of Neurology, European Academy of Neurology, Society for Neuro-Oncology, World Parkinson Coalition, Johns Hopkins University School of Medicine, World Federation of Neurology, International Parkinson and Movement Disorder Society, International League Against Epilepsy, International MPS Society, Dana Foundation and International Brain Research Organization. He serves as a peer reviewer for various international peer-reviewed scientific publishing journals, including The Lancet, Nature, BMC Medicine, BMC Public Health, The Lancet Microbe, The Lancet Regional Health Africa, The Lancet Neurology, BMC Neurology, Mayo Clinic Proceedings Digital Health, Alzheimer's & Dementia Behavior & Socioeconomics of Aging, Travel Medicine and Infectious disease, Journal of Interventional Epidemiology and Public Health, Behavioural Neurology, BMJ, BMJ Open, Dove Medical Press, Health Science Reports, Brain and Behavior Journal, Journal of Medical Virology, International Journal of General Medicine, International Journal of Environmental Science and Technology, Tropical Medicine and Health Journal, BMC Infectious Diseases, Annals of Medicine, European Journal of Neurology, and Annals of Medicine and Surgery.

Olivier Uwishema also serves as a grant reviewer, judge, and lead judge for international research grant institutions, nonprofit international organizations, and universities.

=== OHMO ===
In 2018 Olivier founded Oli Health Magazine Organization (OHMO), a non-profit scientific research organization that operates internationally, based in Europe, North Asia, and Africa. Olivier Uwishema established the Oli Health Magazine Organization (OHMO) using savings from his monthly scholarship stipend, motivated by the lack of research mentorship opportunities available to young people in low- and middle-income countries.

Olivier and OHMO are known for engaging young people in professional health education and scientific research worldwide. In 2020, during the COVID-19 pandemic, Olivier, through OHMO, collaborated with Harvard Medical School students to translate and distribute vital COVID-19 information in 26 languages, including English, Turkish, French, Kinyarwanda, Swahili, Arabic, Mandarin, Italian, and Spanish. That same year, Olivier was featured on the United Nations Youth Envoy's top 10 list of young people who were fighting COVID-19 across the globe.

Through OHMO Olivier organizes the annual International Congress on Neuro-oncology. In December 2019, while studying at Karadeniz Technical University, he organized the first international congress themed "Researches & Innovations in Neuro-Oncological Medicine and Cancer Care," which took place in Trabzon, Turkey. The event was attended by over 300 medical students and other health professionals from across Europe and North Asia. In August 2023, in collaboration with the International Brain Research Organization (IBRO) and the Dana Foundation, OHMO organized the 4th international congress in Kigali, Rwanda, themed "Modern Revolution for the Future of Neuroscience and Neurology." Since 2018, the OHMO Global Research Fellowship has trained young people in scientific research, helping some of them secure scholarships at universities in the USA and Europe.

=== Mental health and neurological diseases projects in Rwanda ===
In 2022 Olivier and OHMO partnered with IBRO and Dana Foundation on carrying out the projects on mental health awareness in Rwanda, where over 10,000 high school and university students were educated. In 2023, under the same partnership, Olivier and OHMO, launched another project in Rwanda on mental health named Navigating the Brain: An Overview of Neurological Disorders for High School Students.

== Memberships ==
Uwishema is a member of international organizations and societies, including the American Academy of Neurology, European Academy of Neurology, International Parkinson and Movement Disorder Society, Royal Society of Tropical Medicine and Hygiene, Society for Neuro-Oncology, Congress of Neurological Surgeons, British Society for Haematology, Society of Vascular and Interventional Neurology, and American Association of Neurological Surgeons.

== Awards ==
1. International Scholar Award given by the Society for Neuro-Oncology in Florida, USA (November 2022).
2. Forbes 30 Under 30 in Medicine and Research by Forbes Magazine (2023). .
3. International Scholar Award given by the American Academy of Neurology in Colorado, USA (April 2024).
4. British Royal Family’s Diana Award, London, United Kingdom (December 2024).
5. H. Richard Tyler Award given by the American Academy of Neurology in Chicago, USA (April 2026).
6. World Federation of Neurology Junior Fellowship Award, London, United Kingdom (March 2026).

== Other recognitions ==
1. Selected for the United Nations Youth Envoy’s top 10 list of young people who were fighting COVID-19 across the globe in 2020.
2. Selected for the Global Advocacy Leadership Program (GALP), an initiative of the American Academy of Neurology and the World Federation of Neurology in 2025.
3. He is ranked in the Stanford–Elsevier Global Ranking among the world’s top 2% most influential researchers and scientists.
4. Judge and Lead Judge for the Diana Award.
5. Named to the TRIIBE 100, recognizing the world’s top next-generation nonprofit founders under the age of 30.

== Publications ==
- Google Scholar-Olivier Uwishema
- Researchgate/Olivier-Uwishema
