= Father of the House (United Kingdom) =

Honorary position in the British parliament

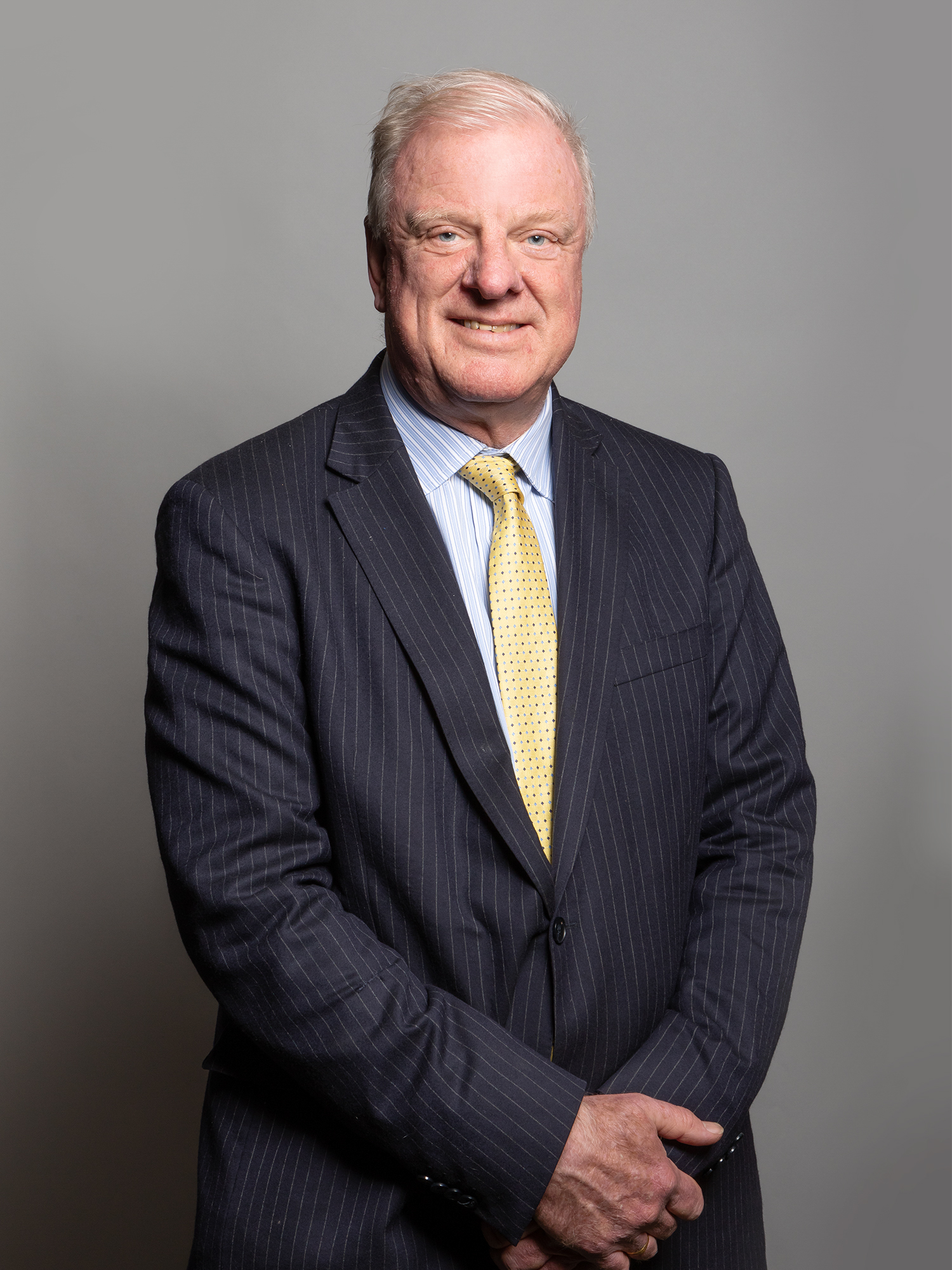
- Incumbent; Sir Edward Leigh since 5 July 2024
- House of Commons of the United Kingdom
- Member of: House of Commons
- Seat: Westminster
- First holder: William Wither Bramston Beach c. 1899

The father of the House is a title that is bestowed on the male member of the House of Commons of the United Kingdom who has the longest continuous service. If two or more members have the same length of current uninterrupted service, then whoever was sworn in earliest, as listed in Hansard, is named as Father of the House.

The only formal duty of the father of the House is to preside over the election of the speaker of the House of Commons. However, the relevant Standing Order does not refer to this member by the title of "Father of the House", but instead to the longest-serving member of the House present who is not a minister of the Crown. Until 1971, the clerk of the House of Commons presided over the election of the Speaker. As the clerk is never a member, and therefore is not permitted to speak, he would silently stand and point at the Member who was to speak. However, this procedure broke down at the election of a new Speaker in 1971 and was changed upon the recommendation of a select committee.

Since the 2024 general election, Sir Edward Leigh has been Father of the House, having been an MP continuously for Gainsborough (previously Gainsborough and Horncastle) since 1983. While other MPs (namely Jeremy Corbyn and Roger Gale) have also served continuously since 1983, Leigh was sworn in first.

The previous father was Sir Peter Bottomley, who was an MP continuously from 1975 until he lost his seat to Labour's Beccy Cooper in the 2024 general election. Bottomley was the first Father to be unseated rather than retire or die in office.

== History ==
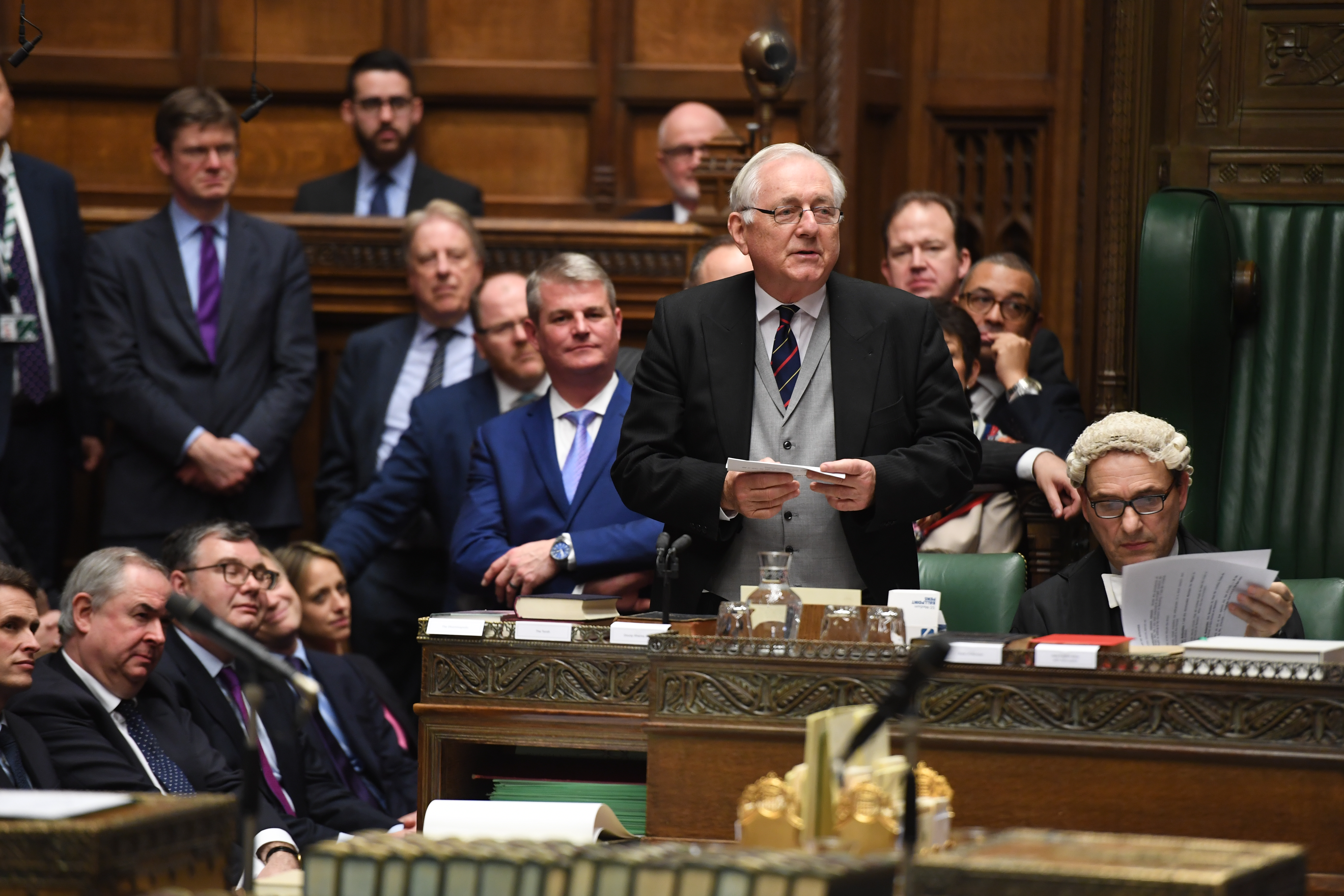
Sir Peter Bottomley presiding over the chamber in 2019

Historically, the father of the House was not a clearly defined term, and it is not clear by what process it was used for individual Members. The first recorded usage of the term dates to 1788, in an obituary of Thomas Noel; it is also attested in an engraved portrait of Whitshed Keene by Charles Picart, from 1816. It may have been interpreted at various times as the oldest member, the member with the longest total service, the member with the longest unbroken service (the modern definition), or the member who entered the House longest ago. There is also some evidence that in the late 19th century, the position may have been elected. The modern definition was not settled upon until the late 1890s.

After the Second World War, a convention arose that the father would normally be a member of the Select Committee on Privileges, but this lapsed following the establishment of the modern Standards and Privileges Committee in the 1990s.

Among the twentieth-century fathers, there were several very prominent figures; four former Prime Ministers became Father of the House, and a fifth, Henry Campbell-Bannerman was simultaneously Father of the House and Prime Minister from May 1907 until soon before his death during April 1908. Almost all have been Privy Councillors.

There has been criticism of the term Father of the House being used instead of Elder of the House as a relic of the "legacy of women’s historic under-representation in the House" and the way in which gendered language affected representation.

To date, all holders of the position have been men. In 2015 Harriet Harman described herself as the 'Mother of the House' as she was the longest continuously serving woman MP. David Cameron referred to her as the Mother the week after, and Theresa May referred to Harriet Harman as the Mother of the House in 2017. Harman had in fact been the longest serving female MP since at least 2010. Following the 2024 general election and Harman's retirement, Diane Abbott became Mother of the House. During speeches at the re-opening of Parliament after the 2024 general election, Diane Abbott was described as the "Mother of the House" by Speaker Sir Lindsay Hoyle, Prime Minister Keir Starmer, and then Leader of the Opposition Rishi Sunak.

== List of Fathers of the House since 1899 ==
This list covers all Fathers of the House since W.W. Beach, the first to become Father after the modern approach (longest period of continuous service) was agreed in 1898. Those who died as Father are indicated by a ^{†}. Those who were unseated are indicated by a ^{U}.

Name	Entered Parliament	Father (Standing Order No 1)	Left House	Party	Constituency
William Wither Bramston Beach	1857	1899	1901^{†}	Conservative	North Hampshire (1857–85); Andover (1885–1901)
Michael Hicks Beach	1864	1901	1906	Conservative	Gloucestershire East (1864–85); Bristol West (1885–1906)
George Finch	1867	1906	1907^{†}	Conservative	Rutland
Sir Henry Campbell-Bannerman	1868	1907	1908^{†}	Liberal	Stirling Burghs
Sir John Kennaway	1870	1908	1910	Conservative	East Devon (1870–85); Honiton (1885–1910)
Thomas Burt	1874	1910	1918	Lib-Lab	Morpeth
T. P. O'Connor	1880	1918	1929^{†}	Irish Nationalist	Galway Borough (1880–85); Liverpool Scotland (1885–1929)
David Lloyd George	1890	1929	1945	Liberal	Caernarvon Boroughs
The Earl Winterton	1904	1945	1951	Conservative	Horsham (1904–18, 1945–51); Horsham and Worthing (1918–45)
Sir Hugh O'Neill	1915	1951	1952	UUP	Mid Antrim (1915–22); Antrim (1922–50); North Antrim (1950–52)
David Grenfell	1922	1952	1959	Labour	Gower
Sir Winston Churchill	1900 continuous from 1924	1959	1964	Conservative	Oldham (1900–04)
Sir Winston Churchill	1900 continuous from 1924	1959	1964	Liberal	Oldham (1904–06); Manchester North West (1906–08); Dundee (1908–22)
Sir Winston Churchill	1900 continuous from 1924	1959	1964	Conservative	Epping (1924–45); Woodford (1945–64)
R. A. Butler	1929	1964	1965	Conservative	Saffron Walden
Sir Robin Turton	1929	1965	1974	Conservative	Thirsk and Malton
George Strauss	1929 continuous from 1934	1974	1979	Labour	Lambeth North (1929–31, 1934–50); Vauxhall (1950–79)
John Parker	1935	1979	1983	Labour	Romford (1935–45); Dagenham (1945–83)
James Callaghan	1945	1983	1987	Labour	Cardiff South (1945–50); Cardiff South East (1950–83); Cardiff South and Penarth (1983–87)
Sir Bernard Braine	1950	1987	1992	Conservative	Billericay (1950–55); South East Essex (1955–83); Castle Point (1983–92)
Sir Edward Heath	1950	1992	2001	Conservative	Bexley (1950–74); Sidcup (1974–83); Old Bexley and Sidcup (1983–2001)
Sir Tam Dalyell	1962	2001	2005	Labour	West Lothian (1962–83); Linlithgow (1983–2005)
Alan Williams	1964	2005	2010	Labour	Swansea West
Sir Peter Tapsell	1959 continuous from 1966	2010	2015	Conservative	Nottingham West (1959–64); Horncastle (1966–83); East Lindsey (1983–97); Louth and Horncastle (1997–2015)
Sir Gerald Kaufman	1970	2015	2017^{†}	Labour	Manchester Ardwick (1970–83); Manchester Gorton (1983–2017)
Kenneth Clarke	1970	2017	2019	Conservative (1970–2019)	Rushcliffe
Kenneth Clarke	1970	2017	2019	Independent (2019)	Rushcliffe
Sir Peter Bottomley	1975	2019	2024^{U}	Conservative	Woolwich West (1975–83); Eltham (1983–97); Worthing West (1997–2024)
Sir Edward Leigh	1983	2024	present	Conservative	Gainsborough and Horncastle (1983–97); Gainsborough (1997–present)

== Earlier "fathers" ==
This list covers all those who would have been considered Father of the House, by the modern definition, since an arbitrary date of 1701. Many of these will not have been considered "Father of the House" by contemporaries, and some men who were described as such are not listed here. These men served in the Parliament of England until the 1707 Acts of Union and from thereafter until the end of 1800 in the Parliament of Great Britain.

Name	Entered Parliament	Father (Standing Order No 1)	Left House	Party	Constituency
Sir John Fagg	1645 continuous from 1653	1701	1701^{†}		Steyning
Thomas Turgis	1659	1701	1704^{†}		Gatton
Sir Christopher Musgrave, 4th Baronet	1661	1704	1704^{†}		Westmorland
Thomas Strangways	1673	1704	1713		Dorset
Sir Richard Onslow	1679	1713	1715	Whig	Guildford (1713–14); Surrey (1714–15)
Thomas Erle	1679	1715	1718	Whig	Wareham
Edward Vaughan	1679	1718	1718^{†}	Whig	Cardiganshire
Richard Vaughan	1685 continuous from 1689	1718	1724^{†}	Whig	Carmarthen
Lord William Powlett	1689	1724	1729^{†}	Tory	Winchester (1689–1710, 1715–29); Lymington (1710–15)
Sir Justinian Isham, 4th Baronet	1685 continuous from 1694	1729	1730^{†}	Tory	Northampton (1685–90, 1694–98); Northamptonshire (1698–30)
Sir Charles Turner, 1st Baronet	1695	1730	1738^{†}	Tory	King's Lynn
Sir Roger Bradshaigh	1695	1738	1747^{†}	Tory	Wigan
Sir Edward Ashe	1695	1747	1747	Tory	Heytesbury
Sir Thomas Cartwright	1695 continuous from 1701	1747	1748^{†}	Tory	Northamptonshire
Sir Richard Shuttleworth	1705	1748	1749^{†}	Tory	Lancashire
Phillips Gybbon	1707	1749	1762^{†}	Whig	Rye
Sir John Rushout, 4th Baronet	1713	1762	1768	Tory	Malmesbury (1713–22); Evesham (1722–68)
William Aislabie	1721	1768	1781^{†}	Whig	Ripon
Charles FitzRoy-Scudamore	1733	1781	1782^{†}	Whig	Thetford (1733–54, 1774–82); Hereford (1754–68); Heytesbury (1768–74)
The Earl Nugent	1741	1782	1784	Tory	St Mawes (1741–54, 1774–84); Bristol (1754–74)
Sir Charles Frederick	1741	1784	1784	Tory	New Shoreham (1741–54); Queenborough (1754–84)
The Lord Mendip	1741	1784	1790	Tory	Cricklade (1741–47); Weymouth and Melcombe Regis (1747–61, 1774–90); Aylesbury (1761–68); Petersfield (1768–74, 1791–95)
William Drake	1746	1790	1796^{†}		Amersham
Sir Philip Stephens, 1st Baronet	1759	1796	1806	Tory	Liskeard (1759–68); Sandwich (1768–1801)
Clement Tudway	1761	1806	1815^{†}	Tory	Wells
Sir John Aubrey, 6th Baronet	1768	1815	1826^{†}	Tory	Wallingford (1768–74, 1780–84); Aylesbury (1774–1780); Buckinghamshire (1780–90); Clitheroe (1790–96); Aldeburgh (1796–1812); Steyning (1812–20); Horsham (1820–26)
Sir Samuel Smith	1788	1826	1832	Tory	St Germans (1788–90); Leicester (1790–1818); Midhurst (1818–20); Wendover (1820–32)
George Byng	1790	1832	1847^{†}	Whig	Middlesex
Charles Williams-Wynn	1797	1847	1850^{†}	Tory (1797–1834)	Old Sarum (1797–99); Montgomeryshire (1797–1850)
Charles Williams-Wynn	1797	1847	1850^{†}	Conservative (1834–50)	Old Sarum (1797–99); Montgomeryshire (1797–1850)
George Harcourt	1806	1850	1861^{†}	Whig (1806–35)	Lichfield (1806–31); Oxfordshire (1831–61)
George Harcourt	1806	1850	1861^{†}	Conservative (1835–57)	Lichfield (1806–31); Oxfordshire (1831–61)
George Harcourt	1806	1850	1861^{†}	Peelite (1857–59)	Lichfield (1806–31); Oxfordshire (1831–61)
George Harcourt	1806	1850	1861^{†}	Liberal (1859–61)	Lichfield (1806–31); Oxfordshire (1831–61)
Sir Charles Burrell, 3rd Baronet	1806	1861	1862^{†}	Tory (1806–34)	New Shoreham
Sir Charles Burrell, 3rd Baronet	1806	1861	1862^{†}	Conservative (1834–62)	New Shoreham
Henry Cecil Lowther	1812	1862	1867^{†}	Tory (1812–34)	Westmorland
Henry Cecil Lowther	1812	1862	1867^{†}	Conservative (1834–67)	Westmorland
Thomas Peers Williams	1820	1867	1868	Tory (1820–34)	Marlow
Thomas Peers Williams	1820	1867	1868	Conservative (1834–68)	Marlow
Henry Lowry-Corry	1825	1868	1873^{†}	Tory (1825–34)	County Tyrone
Henry Lowry-Corry	1825	1868	1873^{†}	Irish Conservative (1834–73)	County Tyrone
George Weld-Forester	1828	1873	1874	Tory (1828–34)	Wenlock
George Weld-Forester	1828	1873	1874	Conservative (1834–74)	Wenlock
Christopher Rice Mansel Talbot	1830	1874	1890^{†}	Whig (1830–59)	Glamorganshire (1830–85); Mid Glamorganshire (1885–90)
Christopher Rice Mansel Talbot	1830	1874	1890^{†}	Liberal (1859–90)	Glamorganshire (1830–85); Mid Glamorganshire (1885–90)
Charles Pelham Villiers	1835	1890	1898^{†}	Liberal (1835–86)	Wolverhampton (1835–85); Wolverhampton South (1885–98)
Charles Pelham Villiers	1835	1890	1898^{†}	Liberal Unionist (1886–98)	Wolverhampton (1835–85); Wolverhampton South (1885–98)
Sir John Mowbray, 1st Baronet	1853	1898	1899^{†}	Conservative	Durham City (1853–85); Oxford University (1885–99)

== Longest-serving member of the House of Lords ==
The title "Father of the House" is not used in the House of Lords: its longest-serving member is recorded on the House website, though no duties or special distinctions are associated with the position.

As of 2026, the longest-serving member and longest-serving female member of the House is the Baroness Cox (Crossbencher), who first took her seat on 2 March 1983.

The below table lists the longest continuously serving members of the House of Lords since the Acts of Union 1707, in the order they achieved that status. Prior to 1707, all members of the Lords were members of the parliament of England.

Until 1898, the longest continuously serving member of the Lords, as with his counterpart in the Commons, was not necessarily considered the senior-most member of that chamber.

Peer	Most senior title in the peerage of	Entitled to seat in Lords as (if with a different peerage or as an elected peer)	Party affiliation	Time served (from when first taking seat)	Tenure	Became longest-serving member	Tenure as longest-serving member
Thomas Leigh, 2nd Baron Leigh	England	–	–	26 January 1673 – 12 November 1710	37 years, 290 days	23 October 1707 (1st Parliament of Great Britain)	3 years, 20 days
Thomas Osborne, 1st Duke of Leeds	England	1st Viscount Latimer (England, from 1673); 1st Earl of Danby (England, from 1674); 1st Marquess of Carmarthen (England, from 1689); 1st Duke of Leeds (England, from 1694)	Tory	20 October 1673 – 26 July 1712	38 years, 280 days	12 November 1710	1 year, 257 days
Thomas Grey, 2nd Earl of Stamford	England		Whig	13 April 1675 – 31 January 1720	44 years, 293 days	26 July 1712	7 years, 189 days
Charles Mordaunt, 3rd Earl of Peterborough and 1st Earl of Monmouth	England	2nd Viscount Mordaunt (England, from 1675); 1st Earl of Monmouth (England, from 1689); 3rd Earl of Peterborough (England, from 1697)	Whig	21 December 1680 – 25 October 1735	54 years, 308 days	31 January 1720	15 years, 267 days
Thomas Bruce, 2nd Earl of Ailesbury and 3rd Earl of Elgin	England	–	–	9 November 1685 – 16 December 1741	56 years, 37 days	25 October 1735	6 years, 52 days
Charles Butler, 1st Earl of Arran	Ireland	1st Baron Butler of Weston (England, from 1694)	–	16 February 1694 – 17 December 1758	64 years, 304 days	16 December 1741	17 years, 1 day
Lionel Sackville, 1st Duke of Dorset	Great Britain	7th Earl of Dorset and 2nd Earl of Middlesex (England, from 1706); 1st Duke of Dorset (Great Britain, from 1720)	–	19 January 1708 – 10 October 1765	57 years, 264 days	17 December 1758	6 years, 297 days
Allen Bathurst, 1st Earl Bathurst	Great Britain	1st Baron Bathurst (Great Britain, from 1712); 1st Earl Bathurst (Great Britain, from 1772)	Tory	2 January 1712 – 16 September 1775	63 years, 257 days	10 October 1765	9 years, 341 days
John Manners, 3rd Duke of Rutland	England	–	Whig	22 March 1721 – 29 May 1779	58 years, 68 days	16 September 1775	3 years, 255 days
Francis North, 1st Earl of Guilford	Great Britain	3rd Baron Guilford (England, from 1729); 1st Earl of Guilford (Great Britain, from 1752)	Whig	13 January 1730 – 4 August 1790	60 years, 203 days	29 May 1779	11 years, 67 days
Robert Marsham, 2nd Baron Romney	Great Britain	–	–	17 January 1733 – 16 November 1793	60 years, 303 days	4 August 1790	3 years, 104 days
Francis Seymour-Conway, 1st Marquess of Hertford	Great Britain	2nd Baron Conway of Ragley (England, from 1732); 1st Earl of Hertford (Great Britain, from 1750); 1st Marquess of Hertford (Great Britain, from 1793)	–	15 November 1739 – 14 June 1794	54 years, 211 days	16 November 1793	210 days
William Byron, 5th Baron Byron	England		–	1 December 1743 – 19 May 1798	54 years, 169 days	14 June 1794	3 years, 339 days
John Ashburnham, 2nd Earl of Ashburnham	Great Britain		–	18 November 1746 – 8 April 1812	65 years, 142 days	19 May 1798	13 years, 325 days
Thomas Brudenell-Bruce, 1st Earl of Ailesbury	Great Britain	2nd Baron Bruce (Great Britain, from 1747); 1st Earl of Ailesbury (Great Britain, from 1776)	–	28 November 1754 – 19 April 1814	59 years, 142 days	8 April 1812	2 years, 11 days
John Peyto-Verney, 14th Baron Willoughby de Broke	England	–	–	3 December 1759 – 15 February 1816	56 years, 74 days	19 April 1814	1 year, 302 days
George Spencer, 4th Duke of Marlborough	England	–	–	8 February 1760 – 29 January 1817	56 years, 356 days	15 February 1816	349 days
Charles Bennet, 4th Earl of Tankerville	Great Britain	–	–	24 November 1767 – 10 December 1822	55 years, 16 days	29 January 1817	5 years, 315 days
Alexander Gordon, 4th Duke of Gordon	Scotland	Scottish representative peer (1768–1784) (Note: Until 31 July 1963, when the Peerage Act 1963 came into effect, peers in the Peerage of Scotland did not have the automatic right to sit in the House of Lords unless they were also peers in the peerages of England, Great Britain or the United Kingdom.); 1st Earl of Norwich (Great Britain, from 1784)	Tory	20 January 1768 – 17 June 1827	59 years, 148 days	10 December 1822	4 years, 189 days
William Fitzwilliam, 4th Earl Fitzwilliam	Great Britain	–	Whig	9 January 1770 – 8 February 1833	63 years, 30 days	17 June 1827	5 years, 236 days
George Wyndham, 3rd Earl of Egremont	Great Britain	–	Whig	15 February 1773 – 11 November 1837	64 years, 269 days	8 February 1833	4 years, 276 days
John Fane, 10th Earl of Westmorland	England	–	Tory	8 February 1780 – 15 December 1841	61 years, 310 days	11 November 1837	4 years, 34 days
Henry Nevill, 2nd Earl of Abergavenny	Great Britain	–	Whig	23 January 1787 – 27 March 1843	56 years, 63 days	15 December 1841	1 year, 102 days
William Cathcart, 1st Earl Cathcart	Scotland	Scottish representative peer (1788–1812); 1st Viscount Cathcart (United Kingdom, from 1807); 1st Earl Cathcart (United Kingdom, from 1814)	–	1 February 1788 – 16 June 1843	55 years, 135 days	27 March 1843	81 days
George Boyle, 4th Earl of Glasgow	Scotland	Scottish representative peer (1790–1818); 1st Baron Ross (United Kingdom, from 1815)	Tory	25 November 1790 – 6 July 1843	52 years, 223 days	16 June 1843	20 days
George Rice, 3rd Baron Dynevor	Great Britain	–	Tory	17 April 1793 – 9 April 1852	58 years, 358 days	6 July 1843	8 years, 278 days
Edward Digby, 2nd Earl Digby	Great Britain	–	–	14 May 1794 – 12 May 1856	61 years, 364 days	9 April 1852	4 years, 33 days
William Amherst, 1st Earl Amherst	United Kingdom	2nd Baron Amherst (Great Britain, from 1797); 1st Earl Amherst (United Kingdom, from 1826)	–	8 November 1797 – 13 March 1857	59 years, 125 days	12 May 1856	305 days
John Rushout, 2nd Baron Northwick	Great Britain	–	–	17 April 1801 – 20 January 1859	57 years, 278 days	13 March 1857	1 year, 313 days
Thomas de Grey, 2nd Earl de Grey	United Kingdom	3rd Baron Grantham (Great Britain, from 1803); 2nd Earl de Grey (United Kingdom, from 1833)	Tory	23 May 1803 – 14 November 1859	56 years, 175 days	20 January 1859	298 days
Robert Haldane-Duncan, 1st Earl of Camperdown	United Kingdom	2nd Viscount Duncan (Great Britain, from 1806); 1st Earl of Camperdown (United Kingdom, from 1831)	–	15 April 1806 – 22 December 1859	53 years, 251 days	14 November 1859	38 days
George Hamilton-Gordon, 4th Earl of Aberdeen	Scotland	Scottish representative peer (1806–1818); 1st Viscount Gordon (United Kingdom, from 1814)	Tory (1806–1834); Conservative (1834–1846; Peelite: 1846–1859); Liberal (1859–1860)	17 December 1806 – 14 December 1860	53 years, 363 days	22 December 1859	358 days
Thomas Hay-Drummond, 11th Earl of Kinnoull	Scotland	4th Baron Hay of Pedwardine (Great Britain)	Conservative	11 March 1807 – 18 February 1866	58 years, 344 days	14 December 1860	5 years, 66 days
Augustus FitzGerald, 3rd Duke of Leinster	Ireland	3rd Viscount Leinster (Great Britain)	–	3 February 1813 – 10 October 1874	61 years, 249 days	18 February 1866	8 years, 234 days
Henry Gage, 4th Viscount Gage	Ireland	3rd Baron Gage (Great Britain)	–	18 February 1813 – 20 January 1877	63 years, 337 days	10 October 1874	2 years, 102 days
Thomas Egerton, 2nd Earl of Wilton	United Kingdom		Conservative	22 June 1821 – 7 March 1882	60 years, 258 days	20 January 1877	5 years, 46 days
Stephen Moore, 3rd Earl Mount Cashell	Ireland	Irish representative peer	–	19 February 1827 – 10 October 1883	56 years, 233 days	7 March 1882	1 year, 217 days
Henry Pelham, 3rd Earl of Chichester	United Kingdom		–	26 February 1827 – 15 March 1886	59 years, 17 days	10 October 1883	2 years, 156 days
John Freeman-Mitford, 1st Earl of Redesdale	United Kingdom	2nd Baron Redesdale (United Kingdom, from 1830); 1st Earl of Redesdale (United Kingdom, from 1877)	–	22 February 1830 – 2 May 1886	56 years, 69 days	15 March 1886	48 days
John Townshend, 1st Earl Sydney	United Kingdom	3rd Viscount Sydney (Great Britain, from 1831); 1st Earl Sydney (United Kingdom, from 1874)	Liberal	25 February 1831 – 14 February 1890	58 years, 354 days	2 May 1886	3 years, 288 days
William King-Noel, 1st Earl of Lovelace	United Kingdom	8th Baron King (Great Britain, from 1833); 1st Earl of Lovelace (United Kingdom, from 1838)	–	26 July 1833 – 29 December 1893	60 years, 156 days	14 February 1890	3 years, 318 days
Hungerford Crewe, 3rd Baron Crewe	United Kingdom	–	–	15 February 1836 – 3 January 1894	57 years, 322 days	29 December 1893	5 days
William Murray, 4th and 3rd Earl of Mansfield	Great Britain	–	Conservative	12 May 1840 – 1 August 1898	58 years, 81 days	3 January 1894	4 years, 210 days
Harry Chichester, 2nd Baron Templemore	United Kingdom	–	–	15 June 1842 – 10 June 1906	63 years, 360 days	1 August 1898	7 years, 313 days
Thomas Coke, 2nd Earl of Leicester	United Kingdom	–	–	29 April 1844 – 24 January 1909	64 years, 270 days	10 June 1906	2 years, 228 days
Horatio Nelson, 3rd Earl Nelson	United Kingdom	–	Conservative	4 February 1845 – 25 February 1913	68 years, 21 days	24 January 1909	4 years, 32 days
Henry Reynolds-Moreton, 3rd Earl of Ducie	United Kingdom	–	Liberal	22 July 1853 – 28 October 1921	68 years, 98 days	25 February 1913	8 years, 245 days
George Coventry, 9th Earl of Coventry	England	–	Conservative	6 June 1859 – 13 March 1930	70 years, 280 days	28 October 1921	8 years, 136 days
Robert Devereux, 16th Viscount Hereford	England	–	–	13 June 1864 – 27 March 1930	65 years, 287 days	13 March 1930	14 days
Charles Gordon, 11th Marquess of Huntly	Scotland	3rd Baron Meldrum (United Kingdom)	Liberal	3 May 1869 – 20 February 1937	67 years, 293 days	27 March 1930	6 years, 330 days
Archibald Kennedy, 3rd Marquess of Ailsa	United Kingdom	–	–	4 June 1872 – 9 April 1938	65 years, 309 days	20 February 1937	1 year, 48 days
Prince Arthur, 1st Duke of Connaught and Strathearn	United Kingdom	–	–	8 June 1874 – 16 January 1942	67 years, 222 days	9 April 1938	3 years, 282 days
John Norton, 5th Baron Grantley	Great Britain	–	–	24 May 1878 – 5 August 1943	65 years, 73 days	16 January 1942	1 year, 201 days
Hugh Lowther, 5th Earl of Lonsdale	United Kingdom	–	–	31 May 1883 – 13 April 1944	60 years, 318 days	5 August 1943	252 days
Aldred Lumley, 10th Earl of Scarbrough	England	–	–	19 February 1885 – 4 March 1945	60 years, 13 days	13 April 1944	325 days
Robert Crewe-Milnes, 1st Marquess of Crewe	United Kingdom	2nd Baron Houghton (United Kingdom, from 1885); 1st Earl of Crewe (United Kingdom, from 1895); 1st Marquess of Crewe (United Kingdom, from 1911)	Liberal	28 January 1886 – 20 June 1945	59 years, 143 days	4 March 1945	108 days
George Rous, 3rd Earl of Stradbroke	United Kingdom	–	Conservative	4 March 1886 – 20 December 1947	61 years, 291 days	20 June 1945	2 years, 183 days
Charles FitzRoy, 4th Baron Southampton	Great Britain	–	–	23 January 1891 – 7 December 1958	67 years, 287 days	20 December 1947	10 years, 352 days
Anthony Ashley-Cooper, 9th Earl of Shaftesbury	England	–	–	4 June 1891 – 25 March 1961	69 years, 294 days	7 December 1958	2 years, 108 days
Henry Paulet, 16th Marquess of Winchester	England	–	–	18 June 1900 – 28 June 1962	62 years, 10 days	25 March 1961	1 year, 95 days
Bertram Gurdon, 2nd Baron Cranworth	United Kingdom	–	–	12 June 1903 – 4 January 1964	60 years, 206 days	28 June 1962	1 year, 190 days
Ralph Stonor, 5th Baron Camoys	England	–	–	13 February 1906 – 3 August 1968	62 years, 172 days	4 January 1964	4 years, 212 days
George Parker, 7th Earl of Macclesfield	Great Britain	–	–	28 February 1910 – 20 September 1975	65 years, 204 days	3 August 1968	7 years, 48 days
Roger Grey, 10th Earl of Stamford	England	–	–	15 January 1918 – 18 August 1976	58 years, 216 days	20 September 1975	333 days
William Compton, 6th Marquess of Northampton	United Kingdom	–	Liberal	11 March 1919 – 30 January 1978	58 years, 325 days	18 August 1976	1 year, 165 days
Randolph Stewart, 12th Earl of Galloway	Scotland	6th Baron Stewart of Garlies (Great Britain, from 1920); 12th Earl of Galloway (Scotland, from 1963)	–	28 April 1920 – 13 June 1978	58 years, 46 days	30 January 1978	134 days
Arthur Hill, 7th Marquess of Downshire	Ireland	7th Earl of Hillsborough (Great Britain)	–	18 May 1920 – 28 March 1989	68 years, 314 days	13 June 1978	10 years, 288 days
Jeffery Amherst, 5th Earl Amherst	United Kingdom	–	Liberal Democrat	17 May 1927 – 4 March 1993	65 years, 291 days	28 March 1989	3 years, 341 days
Dominick Browne, 4th Baron Oranmore and Browne	Ireland	2nd Baron Mereworth (United Kingdom)	–	26 July 1927 – 11 November 1999 (Note: Removed by the House of Lords Act 1999.)	72 years, 108 days	4 March 1993	6 years, 252 days
Edward Douglas-Scott-Montagu, 3rd Baron Montagu of Beaulieu	United Kingdom	Elected to remain in October 1999.	Conservative	26 November 1947 – 31 August 2015	67 years, 278 days	11 November 1999 (Note: Though at their deaths (in 2007 and in 2018, respectively) the Earl Jellicoe and the Lord Carrington were the longest-serving peers, neither had had an unbroken tenure as both had automatically lost their seats on 11 November 1999, and had returned to the Lords the following week as life peers.)	15 years, 293 days
Bertram Bowyer, 2nd Baron Denham	United Kingdom	Elected to remain in October 1999.	Conservative	13 December 1949 – 26 April 2021 (Note: Retired under the provisions of the House of Lords Reform Act 2014.)	71 years, 134 days	31 August 2015	5 years, 238 days
David Trefgarne, 2nd Baron Trefgarne	United Kingdom	Elected to remain in October 1999.	Conservative	3 July 1962 – 27 March 2026	63 years, 267 days	26 April 2021	4 years, 335 days
Edward Foljambe, 5th Earl of Liverpool	United Kingdom	Elected to remain in October 1999.	Conservative	18 November 1969– 17 April 2026	56 years, 150 days	27 March 2026	21 days
Malcolm Sinclair, 20th Earl of Caithness	Scotland	Elected to remain in October 1999.	Conservative	21 January 1970–29 April 2026	56 years, 99 days	17 April 2026	12 days
Caroline Cox, Baroness Cox	United Kingdom	–	Crossbencher	2 March 1983–present	43 years, 238 days	29 April 2026	180 days

== See also ==
- Baby of the House, the equivalent position for the youngest Member of Parliament
- Mother of the House (United Kingdom)
- Father of the House
- Dean of the House (Canada)
- Dean of the United States House of Representatives
