= Hertswood Academy =

- The Hertswood Academy shield The main entrance to Hertswood Academy

Location
- Cowley Hill; Borehamwood, Hertfordshire, WD6 5LG; England; 51°39′59″N 0°15′59″W

Information
- Type: Academy
- Motto: Aim High • Achieve Excellence
- Established: 2000
- Department for Education URN: 138747 Tables
- Ofsted: Reports
- Headteacher: Peter Gillett
- Staff: 180
- Gender: Mixed
- Age: 11 to 18
- Enrolment: 1144
- Houses: Cavendish; Darwin; Nuffield; Somerville
- Colours: Burgundy; Gold
- Website: http://www.hertswoodacademy.org/

Hertswood Academy (formerly Hertswood School) is a coeducational secondary school in Borehamwood, Hertfordshire which gained academy status in January 2013. The headteacher is Wanda Gill, who was appointed in 2025. Peter Gillett, who previously served as headteacher from 2013 to 2025, is now Executive Headteacher and CEO.

Hertswood was established in September 2000 by an amalgamation of five former local schools, which was reflected by the two different sites of the school previously. The Academy has since moved to a single site as part of a project to build new "World Class Facilities" that started work in 2015, and was funded by selling one of the sites for housing. After two years of construction, the new academy buildings opened in September 2019.

An Ofsted inspection in 2025 graded Hertswood Academy as 'Good' in all areas. The report stated "Pupils feel safe and happy at this school. They trust staff and know that any concerns that they raise will be taken seriously and addressed effectively. This creates a secure and supportive environment where pupils can thrive, both academically and personally."

== History ==
The two sites of the academy were previously two of five schools which were closed to be combined into the then named Hertswood School.

=== Beginnings ===
Hertswood School was established to replace Borehamwood's old three-tier system of lower, middle and upper schools with a two-tier system. As such, Lyndhurst, Furzehill and Holmshill middle schools were closed, along with Hawksmoor and Hillside upper schools. The new, larger school was established on the sites of Nicholas Hawksmoor School (previously Borehamwood Grammar School) and Holmshill Secondary Modern, the two schools having been approximately 400 metres apart. The reorganisation was paid for through the sale of the three other sites for housing development.

The school opened in September 2000 under Headteacher Ian Lucas.

=== Arts college and theatre ===
Hertswood School gained specialist arts college status in 2005 and in 2009 The Ark Theatre Borehamwood was established on its upper site. The majority of the two million pound facility was funded by Hertsmere Borough Council, which remains a funding partner to the theatre, as does the academy itself. The theatre remained in place until the site was closed in 2017 as part of work on the new Academy building. The Academy's new theatre opened with the new building in September 2019.

=== Academy status ===
In September 2012, Hertswood became an academy under the Academies Act (2010).

=== Single site development ===
The Hertswood Academy building, which opened September 2019

In November 2013, the academy announced plans to move the entire school to new buildings on the Cowley Hill site, funded by the sale of the Thrift Farm Lane site which would be demolished for housing. In March 2014 plans were pushed back to extend the consultation period.

A planning application was submitted in December 2014 for the new academy, temporary classrooms and the residential development on the Thrift Farm Lane site. This was part of a schedule to move all students to the Cowley Hill site in December 2015 and open the new academy in September 2019.

The academy stated that the new construction would include "a first class community theatre and community sports facilities" as well as "cutting-edge ICT in every classroom, expansive open learning spaces and a superb new restaurant." The new building opened to students as planned in September 2019 for the start of the 2019–20 academic year.

== Academy structure ==
=== Students and staff ===
The academy has approximately 1,150 students, including boys and girls from the age of 11 to 18. This includes approximately 200 students in the academy's sixth form. There are approximately 100 teaching staff, with approximately 40 support staff.

=== House system ===
In 2013 the academy introduced a new house system with four houses, each named after a college at Oxford or Cambridge: Cavendish (blue), Darwin (green), Nuffield (yellow) and Somerville (red). Students compete in events and competitions through the school year, including Sports Day in the summer term, to earn points towards winning the House Cup, which is awarded at the end of each academic year.

Each house has a House Captain from the Sixth Form, who works along side the Head Students and the School Council.

== Alumni ==
Famous alumni include:

- Sophie Pender, founder of the 93% Club
- Jyrelle (Loski) O'Connor-Greenland, drill artist and member of Harlem Spartans
