= Sophie Pender =

Social mobility campaigner

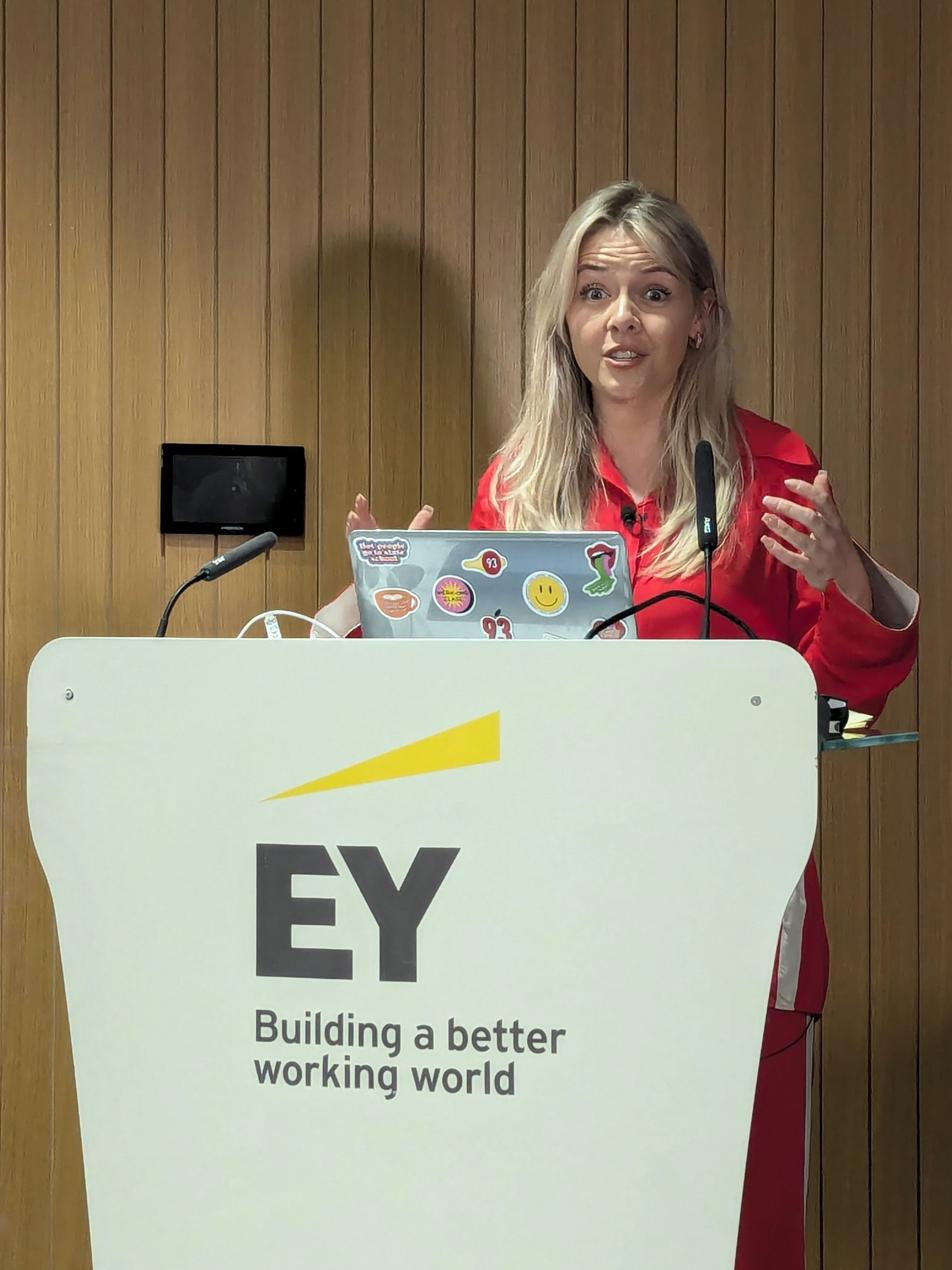
- Sophie Pender speaking in Manchester in 2024
- Born: Sophie Angela Pender; June 1996 (age 30); Borehamwood
- Education: Hertswood Academy
- Alma mater: University of Bristol (BA)
- Employer(s): 93% Club; Herbert Smith Freehills; Bates Wells Braithwaite; University of Bristol Students' Union
- Awards: Forbes 30 Under 30 (2022); Diana Award

Sophie Angela Pender (born 1996) is a British founder and social mobility commentator, best known as the CEO of The 93% Club, a registered charity described as the UK's "least exclusive members club" for people educated in state schools.

== Early life and education ==
Pender grew up on a council estate in North London. She lost her father to substance abuse. Pender was educated at Hertswood Academy in Borehamwood. She worked two jobs to support herself during her studies, and achieved straight A*s for her A-Levels the first student in her school to do so. Pender studied English at the University of Bristol, and was the first in her family to attend higher education. Pender graduated from the University of Bristol in 2017.

During her time in the University of Bristol she became involved with efforts to improve social mobility, with the University of Bristol Students' Union and the charity Access Aspiration. Whilst an undergraduate student Pender founded The 93 Percent Club. The club became a national network of student societies, who worked with organisations to improve the employability of graduates educated in state schools. Pender has referred to The 93% Club as an alternative Bullingdon Club challenging old boy networks.

== Career ==
After graduating she worked as a city lawyer for Herbert Smith Freehills and Bates Wells Braithwaite before working full-time for The 93% Club.

In June 2026, Picador announced that it had won a 13-way auction on Pender's first book, 'What School Did You Go To?' The book is due to be published in 2028.

=== Awards and honours ===
Pender was named as Forbes 30 Under 30 in 2022, and won the Diana Award and was named a Woman to Watch by The Times in 2017.
