= Andrew Phillips, Baron Phillips of Sudbury =

British solicitor and politician (1939–2023)

The Right Honourable The Lord Phillips of Sudbury OBE
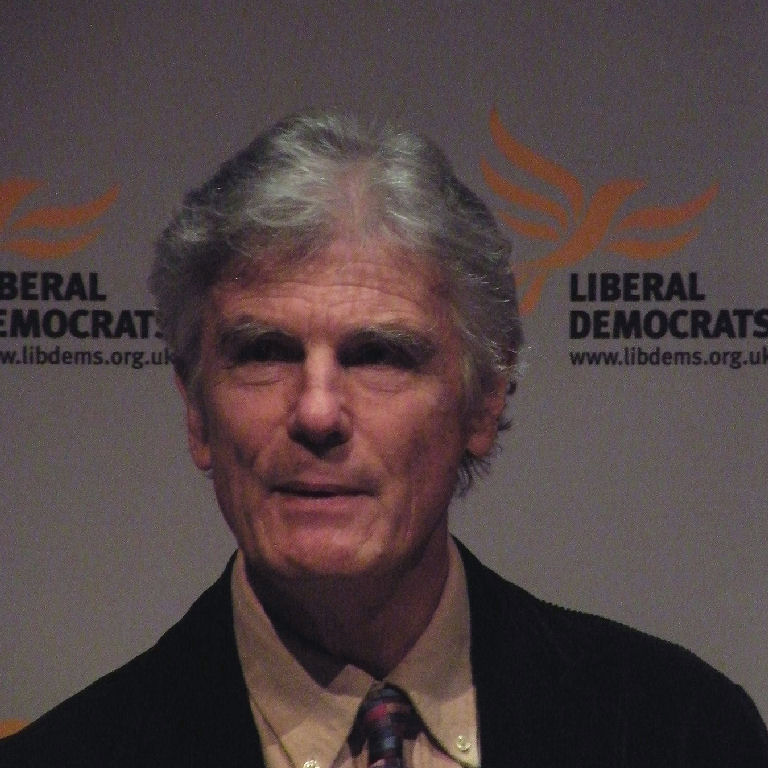
- Phillips in 2010

Chancellor of the University of Essex
- In office 28 April 2003 – 21 July 2014
- Vice-Chancellor: Ivor Crewe; Colin Riordan; Anthony Forster
- Preceded by: The Lord Nolan
- Succeeded by: The Baroness Chakrabarti

Member of the House of Lords
- Lord Temporal
- Life peerage 25 July 1998 – 7 May 2015

Personal details
- Born: Andrew Wyndham Phillips; 15 March 1939 Long Melford, Suffolk, England
- Died: 9 April 2023 (aged 84)
- Party: Liberal Democrats
- Spouse: Penelope Ann Bennett (m. 1968)
- Children: 3
- Education: Trinity Hall, Cambridge
- Occupation: Solicitor and politician

Andrew Wyndham Phillips, Baron Phillips of Sudbury, OBE (15 March 1939 – 9 April 2023) was a British solicitor and Liberal Democrat politician.

== Education and legal practice ==
Andrew Phillips attended Culford School, Uppingham School and Trinity Hall, Cambridge, where he read Economics and Law, then qualified as a solicitor in 1964, eventually specialising in charity law. Before university he worked in his father's law firm in their home town of Sudbury. After qualifying he worked as a salaried partner at Pritchard Englefield and then Lawford & Co. In 1970 he founded commercial law firm Bates Wells Braithwaite giving it the same name as his father's firm, though it was an entirely independent entity.

Phillips provided legal advice to secure charitable status for organisations including the Fairtrade Foundation, the Village Retail Stores Association, Charity Bank and Switchboard (previously the London Lesbian and Gay Switchboard) (1974). Phillips also represented Richard Harries, the Bishop of Oxford, in a case against the Church Commissioners over ethical investment of their assets in Harries v The Church Commissioners for England.

Phillips stepped down as senior partner of Bates Wells Braithwaite when he joined the House of Lords in 1998. An article in The Times in 2012 described him as "one of the most identifiable and respected English lawyers of his generation".

== Broadcasting and publishing ==
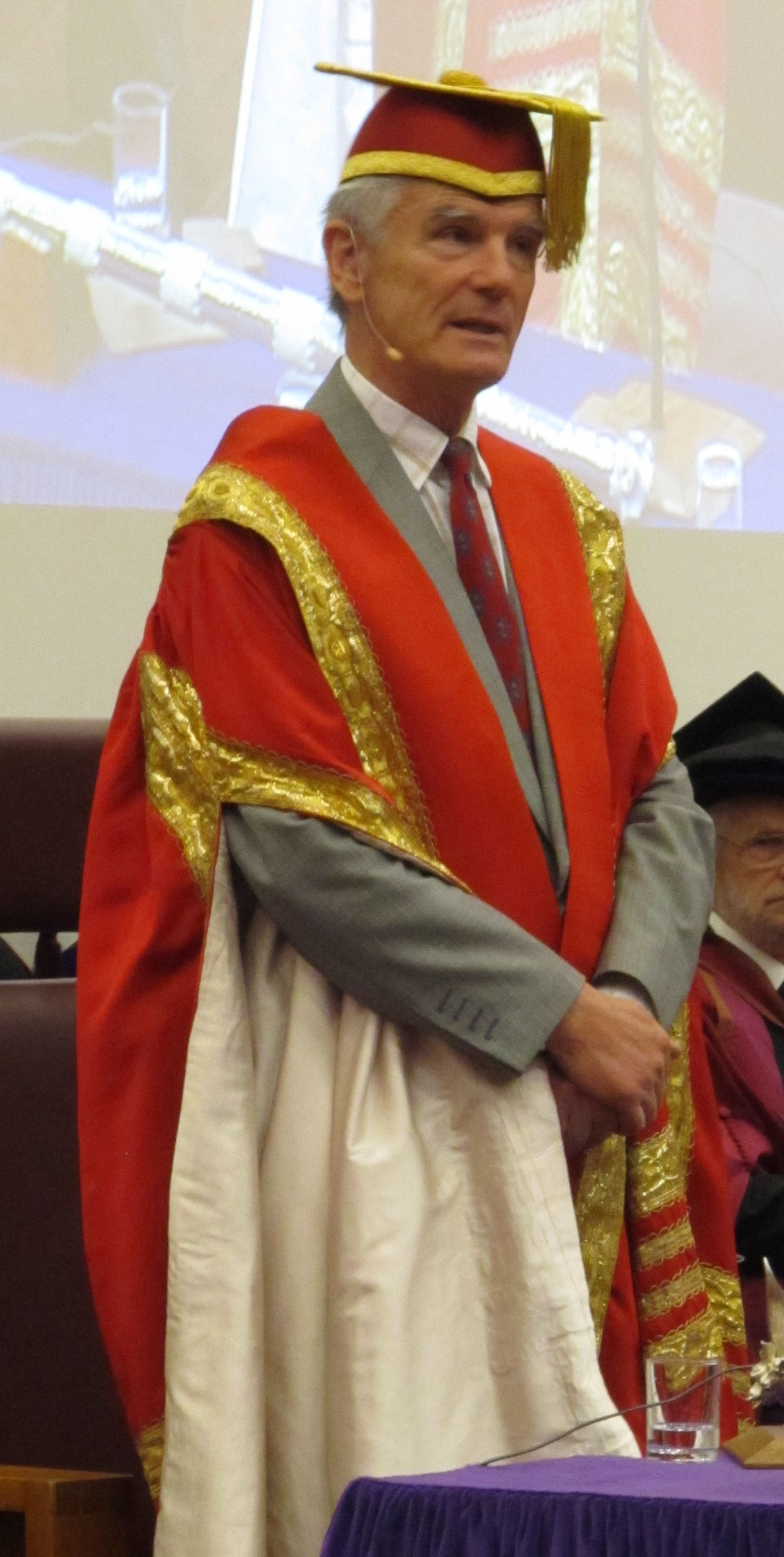
Presiding as Chancellor over the 2012 University of Essex graduation ceremony

From 1976 to 2002, he appeared on BBC Radio 2's Jimmy Young Show as the "legal eagle," giving legal advice to the show's listeners. In 1981 and 1982 Phillips presented 30 episodes of The London Programme, a current affairs show on London Weekend Television.

From 1992 until 2002 Phillips was on the board of the Scott Trust, owner of The Guardian. He contributed a number of articles for The Guardian and wrote a monthly law column for Good Housekeeping. He was appointed an Officer of the Order of the British Empire in the 1996 New Year Honours.

Phillips was the Chancellor of University of Essex from April 2003 to July 2013.

== Charity work ==
Phillips was co-founder and first chairman of the Legal Action Group in 1971, and also in the same year co-founded The Parlex Group of trans-Europe lawyers. He co-founded the Solicitors Pro Bono Group (LawWorks) in 1996, and remained President until his death. He also supported Age UK through his representation for the charity on the Funeral Plan Trust board. Through this he ensured that funds set aside for funerals pre-purchased from third parties was retained securely and safe from being diverted to commercial interests. Phillips was a member of first board of the Community Fund, distributing National Lottery funds. Phillips secured funding from The Law Society to set up the Law in Education Project in 1985 to create educational resources for schools. In 1989, the Citizenship Foundation was founded out of this project. Phillips remained President of the Citizenship Foundation (renamed Young Citizens in 2018) until his death.

== Political work and House of Lords ==
Phillips was originally a member of the Labour Party, and contested the 1970 General Election for Labour in Harwich. But he was expelled from the party in 1973 for publishing a letter in The Times deploring the party's policy of nationalising the top 100 companies and indemnifying trade unionists with criminal convictions, and joined the Liberals in the early 1970s. He unsuccessfully stood as a Liberal candidate in Saffron Walden in both a 1977 by-election and the 1979 General Election. He was also unsuccessful as the Liberal candidate in Gainsborough and Horncastle at the 1983 general election. He was the unsuccessful Liberal candidate for Essex North East constituency for the first European Parliament elections in 1979.

On 25 July 1998, Phillips was made a life peer as Baron Phillips of Sudbury, of Sudbury in the County of Suffolk. He sat in the House of Lords as a Liberal Democrat. Phillips was one of six peers on the joint pre-legislative scrutiny committee of the bill that was later passed as the Charities Act 2006. He led the response to it in the Lords, putting down over 200 amendments. In 2001, he proposed an amendment to the bill that later formed the European Communities (Amendment) Act 2002 requesting that the government send a leaflet to every household in the UK spelling out the impact of the Treaty of Nice. He voted to leave the EU in the 2016 referendum. Phillips led the Liberal Democrats' opposition in the Lords to the government's bill that eventually led to the passing of the Identity Cards Act 2006.

In July 2006 Phillips announced that he would take a permanent leave of absence from the House of Lords (at the time resigning was not possible). He introduced a Private Member's Bill permitting the resignation of life peers, but it failed. Therefore, Phillips took leave of absence from the House, meaning he was unable to attend or vote, but could return at a month's notice. In 2009, Phillips ended his leave of absence, returning to the Chamber to speak and vote once again. The House of Lords Reform Act 2014 allowed him finally to resign, which he did on 7 May 2015.

== Views ==
=== Other public activities ===
In 2007 he made a citizen's arrest on a boy who allegedly threw Phillips's bike to the ground, after he told the boy and his friends they shouldn't cycle along a narrow path as it could be dangerous to parents with prams.

In 2014 he delivered the Hinton Lecture for the National Council for Voluntary Organisations entitled "Whither the common good?". It lamented the "disillusioned citizenry", "macho-money-lust" and "licensed greed and corruption" that have taken over society. At a Charity Finance Group event in 2012, he decried our "valueless society" and said the voluntary sector was its only hope.

Phillips at times criticised the law profession including the introduction of both the Limited Liability Partnerships Act 2000 and the Legal Services Act 2007.

=== Views on Israel ===
Phillips was a supporter of Israel, and offered to fight for Israel in the 1973 Arab–Israeli War. But visiting Israel, the West Bank and Gaza for the first time in 2001, and a number of times since, altered his view. He believed Israel's controls on Gaza are contrary to international law and simple morality, and that international action on the Gaza situation is in the interests of Israel. Phillips called for economic and cultural sanctions on Israel. The Jewish Chronicle has featured opinion articles critical of Phillips.

== Personal life and death ==
Andrew Phillips married Penelope Ann Bennett in 1968. They had a son, two daughters and five grandchildren.

Philips died from complications of Alzheimer's disease on 9 April 2023, at the age of 84.

Academic offices
Preceded by The Lord Nolan	Chancellor of the University of Essex; 2003–2014	Succeeded by Shami Chakrabarti
