= Claudia Trenkwalder =

German neurologist

- Born: 1959 (age 66–67); Bavaria, Germany
- Citizenship: German
- Education: LMU Munich, MD – 1986
- Occupation: Neurologist

Claudia Trenkwalder (born 1959) is a German neurologist.

== Early life and education ==
Trenkwalder was born in Augsburg, Bavaria, Germany. She attended the Otto-von-Taube-Gymnasium in Gauting, near Munich. She enrolled in LMU Munich to study human medicine in 1979. She completed her medical degree in 1986 and was awarded a Doctor of Medicine in the same year. Trenkwalder undertook specialist training in neurology at the University Hospital Munich-Großhadern in 1988–1993. Trenkwalder completed her habilitation with a thesis on restless legs syndrome (RLS). Her postdoctoral research focused on the epidemiology, causes, diagnosis, and treatment of RLS.

== Career ==
Trenkwalder joined the Max Planck Institute of Psychiatry in Munich as a senior physician in neurology. As a founding member and president of the World Association of Sleep Medicine (WASM), she led its merger with the World Federation of Sleep Research and Sleep Medicine to form Worldsleep. Trenkwalder is a founding member of the European Restless Legs Syndrome Study Group (EURLSSG). She also founded the German Restless Legs Association. In 2000, she joined the Department of Clinical Neurophysiology at the University Medical Center Göttingen, where she continued her research on movement disorders, sleep medicine, Parkinson's disease, restless legs syndrome (RLS), and neurophysiology.

Since 2012, Trenkwalder has served as a W3 endowed professorship of neurology at the Department of Neurosurgery of the University Medical Center Göttingen, and has collaborated with neurosurgeons in the clinical management of Parkinson's disease, particularly in the application of deep brain stimulation (DBS) for movement disorders. Trenkwalder was appointed Chief Physician of the Paracelsus-Elena-Klinik in Kassel, Germany, in 2003.

Trenkwalder has been involved in Parkinson's disease research through her service within the International Parkinson and Movement Disorder Society (IPMDS), which is based on international collaboration in clinical care, education, and research on Parkinson's disease and other movement disorders. She became the first female president of the society in 2019.

== Honors ==
- 2016 Honorary Member of the Austrian Parkinson Society – 2016
- Elected Fellow, European Academy of Neurology (EAN) – 2018
- Award for Special Merits for German Neurology of the German Neurological Society (DGN) – 2022
- Honorary Membership of the German Parkinson and Movement Disorders Society (DPG)
- President's Distinguished Service Award, International Parkinson and Movement Disorder Society (IPMDS)

== Selected publications ==
Trenkwalder's publications cover Parkinson's disease, restless legs syndrome, sleep disorders, neurophysiology, biomarkers, and genetic risk factors. Some are:

- Genome-wide Meta-Analyses of Restless Legs Syndrome Yield Insights into Genetic Architecture, Disease Biology and Risk Prediction
- Parkinson's Disease Sleep Scale - Validation of the Revised Version (PDSS-2) – 2011
- Monitoring of 30 Marker Candidates in Early Parkinson Disease as Progression Markers – 2016

She has published over 400 peer-reviewed articles and has authored or co-authored over 700 scientific publications.
