= Giovanni Frisoni =

Alzheimer Researcher

- Born: February 26, 1961 (age 65)
- Other name: Giovanni Battista Frisoni

Giovanni Frisoni (born 26 February 1961), also known as Giovanni B Frisoni (Giovanni Battista Frisoni), is an Italian neurologist and scientist specializing in cognitive disorders and Alzheimer's disease.

He is a professor in the department of rehabilitation and geriatrics at the University of Geneva and former director of the Centre de la mémoire at Geneva University Hospitals.

== Early life and education ==
Frisoni was born in Brescia, Italy on 26 February 1961. His mother was a primary school teacher.

Frisoni studied in Brescia and Parma where he graduated cum laude in medicine and surgery in 1986 and specialized in neurology in 1990.

== Career ==
In 1991, Frisoni became a founding physician of one of the first Italian hospitals entirely devoted to the care of patients with Alzheimer's disease and other dementias. He began his career as a clinician but, over time, research became his main focus.

In 2013, he moved to University of Geneva where he holds a clinical leadership position at the Geneva University Hospitals. In 2018, he founded the Geneva Memory Center.

Frisoni is active in public science outreach, organizing educational events, hosting colloquia, giving interviews for broader divulgation and participating in awareness campaigns on memory disorders. He has produced educational videos for patients and caregivers, contributed as a medical advisor to the movie The Life Ahead (2020), and developed the multilingual resource of the Swiss Brain Health Registry.

He has been active in open science as the principal founder or co-founder of research infrastructures such as neuGRID and GAAIN (Global Alzheimer's Association Interactive Network). He has also served as an invited commentatorfor publications in Lancet Neurology.

In 2023, Frisoni became a fellow of the European Academy of Neurology and, in 2025, he has launched the first Swiss publicly-funded dementia prevention program.

In 2026, he stepped down as director of the Geneva Memory Center and was succeeded by Aurélien Lathuilière.

== Research ==
Frisoni's research has mainly focused on advanced translational science in Alzheimer's disease and routine patient care but he has also investigated other forms of dementia, notably the effects of frontotemporal dementia on musical tastes.

He introduced amyloid PET imaging in Italy and his group was the first to confirm an association of gut microbiota with Alzheimer's disease in humans. He has led global initiatives to standardize hippocampal volumetry on MRI, European initiatives promote the appropriate use of diagnostic biomarkers in memory clinics and dementia prevention in BrainHealth Services. His recent work includes coordinating a large global team for The Lancet series on dementia diagnostics, treatment, and innovation.

== Publications ==
Frisoni has authored over 860 peer-reviewed scientific papers, with an h-index of 143 (Google Scholar) and more than 93,000 citations. He has also been recognized as highly-cited researcher in 2018, 2019, 2020, 2023, and 2024 on Clarivate's Web of Science.
