= Vivi Lin =

Taiwanese Menstrual Rights Activist

- 林薇

Personal details
- Born: 10 May 1998 (age 28) Yilan, Taiwan
- Domestic partner: Nathan Law
- Education: University of Oxford; The University of Edinburgh; United World College
- Occupation: Activist
- Awards: Forbes 30 Under 30 (2024); The Diana Legacy Award (2021); The Diana Award (2021); Tatler Asia GenT (2021)

Vivi Lin (Mandarin: 林薇; born 10 May 1998) is a period equity and gender equality activist from Taiwan. She founded an NGO named With Red in 2019 to promote period equity in Taiwan and Asia. By 2021, they have reached more than 500,000 people. In 2022, she opened the world's only Period Museum in Taipei, Taiwan.

In 2021, Vivi was awarded the Diana Award, the Diana Legacy Award and Tatler Asia GenT for her accomplishments in period equity. In 2023, Vivi was awarded the Gender Responsive Education Award by HundrED for her contribution in advocating for and advancing gender equality through her work. In May 2024, she was listed on the Forbes 30 Under 30 Asia Social Impact category.

In 2024, Blavatnik School of Government announced that Vivi has been awarded full scholarship as a Jardine Scholar to read Master of Public Policy at the University of Oxford.

== Activism ==
=== Human rights, menstrual justice, and gender equality ===
Vivi works with the public, the private, and the civic society on bringing affordable menstrual products to every individual who menstruates in Taiwan and addressing period stigma. Along with her team, they have distributed menstrual products and supported 4000 young people experiencing period poverty in Taiwan. She has also raised funds to provide emergency care kits to devastated areas during the Russian invasion of Ukraine and 2023 Turkey earthquake. Over the years, Vivi and her team at With Red have recreated the Taiwanese menstrual education curriculum, making it inclusive and accessible. They have published resources, trained educators and caregivers, and influenced educational policies. Vivi has also helped National Taiwan University establish a course on menstruation where she currently lectures.

Recognising that opposition to menstrual equity often arises from misunderstanding or unfamiliarity, Vivi led the establishment of the world’s only brick-and-mortar Period Museum in 2022, located in Taipei. She stated that "having a physical building is a good way of raising awareness and ensuring the issue is not overlooked." The museum has since attracted thousands of visitors from around the world, with 40% of the visitors being male.

In 2023, through the policy proposal led by Vivi and her team, Taiwan became the first country in Asia to mandate a nationwide provision of free menstrual products. Their advocacy efforts also secured free menstrual products in 20 metro stations in Taipei and various cities across Taiwan. Additionally, they developed a "period-friendly map," a tool that helps individuals locate shops and public places offering free menstrual products or WASH facilities for those in need. By May 2024, the map had been accessed over one million times.

=== Advocacy for Taiwan’s Global Standing ===
In 2020, Vivi uploaded an open-letter video on social media that went viral, garnering over 1.7 million views. In the video, she called for an apology from WHO Director-General Tedros Adhanom Ghebreyesus for false accusations made against Taiwan during a WHO press conference regarding racial discrimination. Vivi countered these claims by presenting evidence of Taiwan's long-standing support for its African allies, such as Eswatini, and its contributions to the international community during the COVID-19 pandemic. She also raised concerns about the relationship between Tedros, the WHO, and China, as well as the accusations directed at Taiwan.
