= Richmond electoral division =

Richmond electoral division could refer to:

- Division of Richmond, New South Wales federal division
- Electoral district of Richmond (New South Wales)
- Electoral district of Richmond (Victoria)
- Richmond (electoral division), Greater London Council
