= Oli Health Magazine Organization =

Scientific research organization

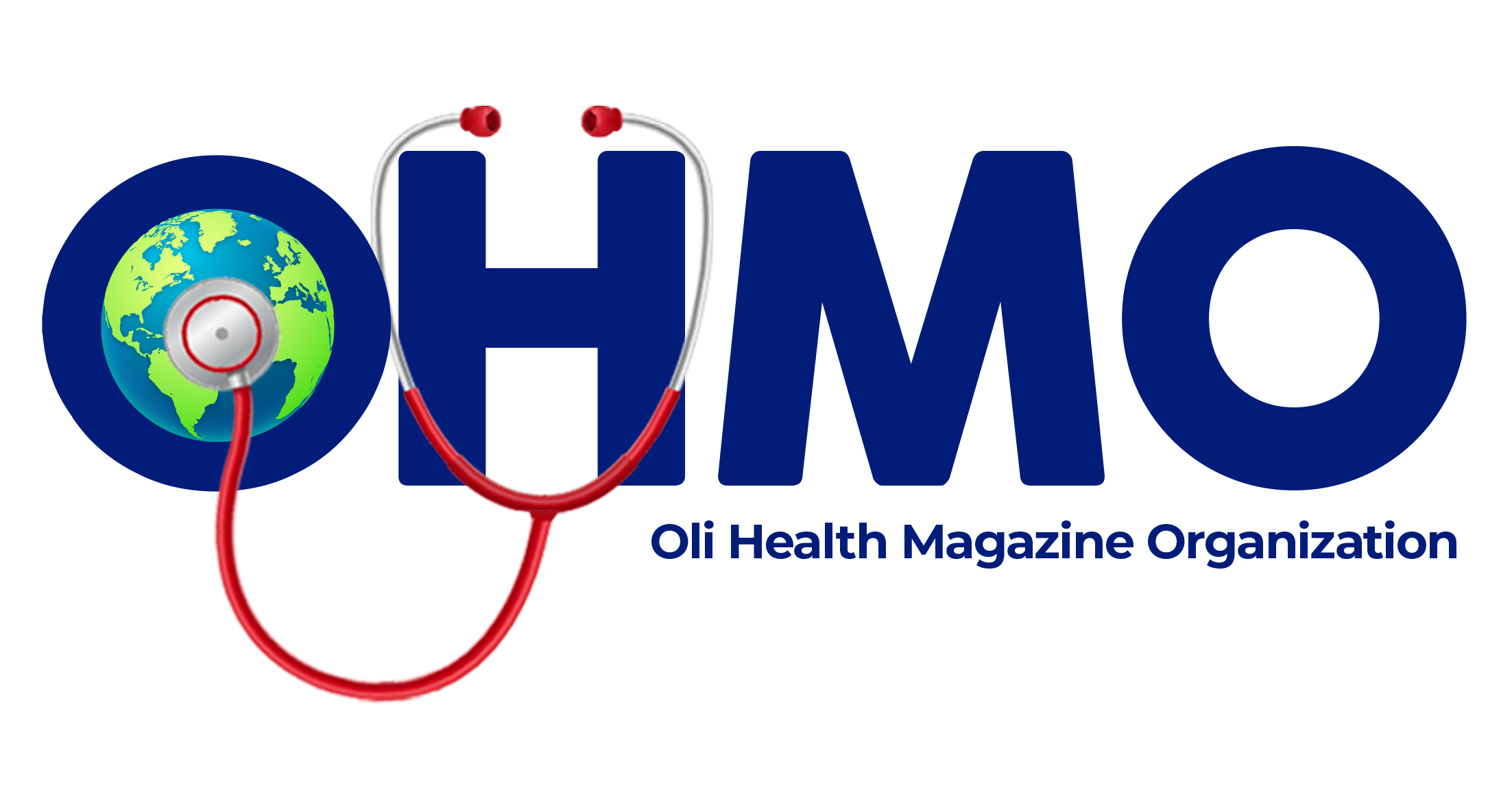
- Abbreviation: OHMO
- Formation: 2018; 8 years ago
- Founder: Olivier Uwishema
- Type: Learned society, professional association, Nonprofit
- Official language: English
- Website: OHMO.org

Oli Health Magazine Organization (OHMO) is a non-profit scientific research organization founded in 2018. The organization focuses on promoting health education and supporting early-career researchers through training, research initiatives, and international collaboration. OHMO operates across multiple regions, including Africa, Europe, and Asia.

During the COVID-19 pandemic, OHMO worked with students from Harvard Medical School to translate and disseminate public health information on COVID-19 in 26 languages.

== History ==
OHMO was founded in 2018 by Olivier Uwishema while he was a medical student in Turkey. OHMO was formed as a non-profit organization with the aim of engaging young people in professional health education and scientific research worldwide. According to Forbes, he established the organization using savings from his monthly scholarship stipend, motivated by a lack of research mentorship opportunities for young people in low- and middle-income countries. Early in its development, the initiative faced skepticism from some academics regarding the ability of medical students to contribute to scientific research.

== Activities ==
=== COVID-19 ===
During the COVID-19 crisis, OHMO, in collaboration with Harvard Medical students, translated and distributed vital COVID-19 information in 26 international languages, such as English, Turkish, French, Arabic, Mandarin, Russian and Spanish among others. The collaboration was explaining what COVID-19 is, how it was affecting people, and how they could protect themselves in order to cope with COVID-19. In the same period, OHMO's leader, Olivier Uwishema, was featured on the United Nations Youth Envoy’s top 10 list of young people who were fighting COVID-19 across the globe.

=== Neurological Diseases Awareness, Neuro-oncological Diseases awareness and Mental Health Diseases Awareness ===
In 2022, OHMO partnered with International Brain Research Organization (IBRO) and Dana Foundation to implement neuroscience and mental health awareness programs in Rwanda, targeting secondary school and university students. In 2023, the organization continued these efforts through additional educational initiatives, including programs focused on neurological disorders named Navigating the Brain: An Overview of Neurological Disorders for High School Students.

== OHMO Global Research Fellowships ==
Since 2018, OHMO has been launching annually the OHMO Global Research Fellowship, a six-month program of research mentorship and training that focus on finding solutions by researching the most pressing health problems and diseases in different communities. The program trained young people in scientific research, helping them engage in research and contributed to the creation of educational medical and health articles.

== OHMO congress ==
OHMO organized the International Congresses on Neuro-oncology, which brings together students, researchers, and health professionals. The first edition was held in 2019 in Trabzon, Turkey. Subsequent editions have taken place in different locations, including Kigali, Rwanda, where the fourth congress was held in 2023 with a focus on developments in neuroscience and neurology.

== Publications ==
- OHMO- PubMed
- OHMO-Articles
