= NeuGRID =

- Logo
- Website: www.neugrid2.eu
- Current status: Active

neuGRID is a web portal aimed to (i) help neuroscientists do high-throughput imaging research, and (ii) provide clinical neurologists automated diagnostic imaging markers of neurodegenerative diseases for individual patient diagnosis. neuGRID's user-friendly environment is customised to a range of users from students to senior neuroscientists working in the fields of Alzheimer's disease, psychiatric diseases, and white matter diseases. neuGRID aims to become a widespread resource for brain imaging analyses.

== Process ==
Through the single virtual access point Science Gateway web portal, users login and access a “virtual” imaging laboratory. Here users can upload, use, and share algorithms for brain imaging analysis, have access to large neuroimaging datasets, and make computationally intensive analyses, all the time with specialized support and training. Thanks to distributed services and grid/cloud computational resources, analyses with neuGRID are much faster than traditional-style lab-based analyses. neuGRID's proof-of-concept was carried out in 2009 when an Alzheimer's disease biomarker (3D cortical thickness with Freesurfer and CIVET) was extracted from 6.500 MR scans in 2 weeks versus 5 years that it would have taken in a traditional setting.

== History ==
neuGRID was first funded by the European Commission DG INFSO within the 7th Framework Program from 2008 to 2011. Here, the hardware and middleware infrastructure were developed. The second wave was funded in 2011 by the European Commission, now DG CONNECT, under the project neuGRID for you (N4U), with the main aim of expanding user services with more intuitive and graphical interfaces. N4U ended in April 2015.

== Consortium ==
The initial neuGRID consortium involved 8 European partners from Italy, France, UK, Nederland, Sweden, Spain and Switzerland. N4U involved 9 European partners (6 of which already in neuGRID) and 2 North Americans. International partners have been involved thanks to a support action funded once more by DG INFSO (outGRID, http://www.outgrid.eu). The coordinator of all three projects is Giovanni B Frisoni, neurologist based at the IRCCS Fatebenefratelli, The National Centre for Alzheimer's Disease in Brescia, Italy.

== Other publications ==
=== Neuroscientific studies where neuGRID has been used as a resource ===
- Redolfi, A; Bosco, P; Manset, D; Frisoni, GB; The Neugrid Consortium (2013). "Brain investigation and brain conceptualization". Functional Neurology. 28 (3): 175–90. PMC 3812741. PMID 24139654.
- Cover, Keith S.; Van Schijndel, Ronald A.; Van Dijk, Bob W.; Redolfi, Alberto; Knol, Dirk L.; Frisoni, Giovanni B.; Barkhof, Frederik; Vrenken, Hugo; NeuGRID; Alzheimer's Disease Neuroimaging Initiative (2011). "Assessing the reproducibility of the SienaX and Siena brain atrophy measures using the ADNI back-to-back MP-RAGE MRI scans". Psychiatry Research: Neuroimaging. 193 (3): 182–90. doi:10.1016/j.pscychresns.2011.02.012. PMID 21764565.
- Frisoni, Giovanni B.; Fox, Nick C.; Jack Jr, Clifford R.; Scheltens, Philip; Thompson, Paul M. (2010). "The clinical use of structural MRI in Alzheimer disease". Nature Reviews Neurology. 6 (2): 67–77. doi:10.1038/nrneurol.2009.215. PMC 2938772. PMID 20139996.
- For a complete list of the neuGRID publications please visit: https://www.neugrid2.eu/index.php/scientific-publications/
