= Georgina Lara Booth =

British-Dutch humanitarian

Georgina Lara Booth FRSA
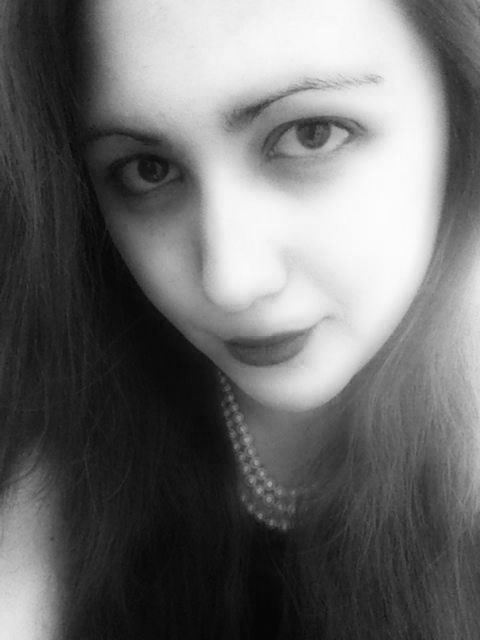
- Born: London, England
- Education: Columbia University in the City of New York
- Occupations: Humanitarian, actress, journalist, writer
- Awards: Forbes 30 Under 30; Diana Award; Fellowship of the Royal Society of Arts
- Website: www.georginalarabooth.com

Georgina Lara Booth is a British-Dutch humanitarian public figure, journalist, and writer. She is the Chief Editor Social Good of the global digital news platform and media company Mashable (Benelux), where she is also a writer.

Booth has received the Diana Award for her humanitarian work, named a Fellow of the Royal Society of Arts for her achievements in art and society, and has been listed on the Forbes 30 Under 30 for her work in media.

== Biography ==
Booth has held the title of Ambassador of Peace in a collaborative partnership with IKV Pax Christi. Booth organized many activities as an Ambassador of Peace, ranging from a masquerade peace ball in the National Museum of Ethnology to lectures and debates about peace with many prominent experts, including the former Defense Minister of the Netherlands Joris Voorhoeve, a Dutch Member of Parliament and musician Merlijn Twaalfhoven about conflicts surrounding raw materials in countries such as Congo, Colombia and Sudan.

As an advocate for women's rights, Booth has also been a UN Women delegate for the United Kingdom since 2021 and attended the Commission on the Status of Women, the United Nations organ promoting gender equality and the empowerment of women.

Booth leads the Social Good content and publications desk of Mashable (Benelux), writing about social good, sustainability, social entrepreneurship, charities, NGOs and humanitarian work.

== Awards and recognition ==
In 2013 Booth was awarded the Diana Award for her work organising a "peace week" program in 2012 with her sister.

In 2015 Booth was elected to Fellowship of the Royal Society of Arts in London, UK, for achievement and contribution to the arts and society.

In March 2023 Booth was recognized by Forbes in their annual Forbes 30 under 30 list for the Media category. In honour of International Women's Day in March 2024, the Royal Society of Arts published a list of "Nine famous female Fellows inspiring inclusion" and selected Booth as one of the nine women who promote and foster gender equality in all areas of society for future generations, which also included former President of Ireland Mary Robinson, 18th century painter Mary Moser and electrical engineer Dame Caroline Haslett.
