= Edward Leigh =

British politician (born 1950)

The Right Honourable Sir Edward Leigh KCSG MP
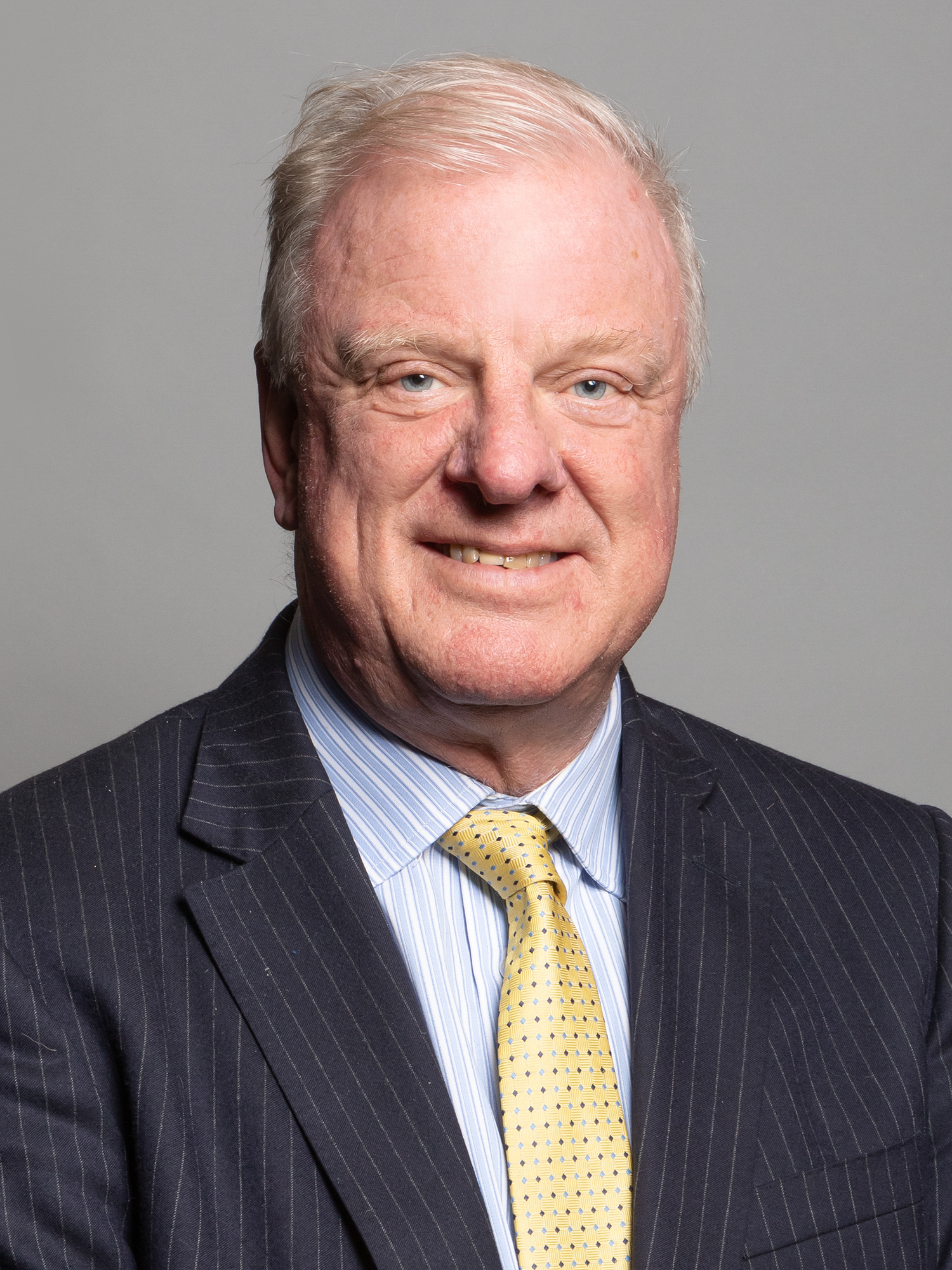
- Official portrait, 2020

Father of the House
- Incumbent
- Assumed office 5 July 2024
- Speaker: Sir Lindsay Hoyle
- Preceded by: Sir Peter Bottomley

Parliamentary Under-Secretary of State for Trade and Industry
- In office 2 November 1990 – 27 May 1993
- Prime Minister: Margaret Thatcher; John Major
- Preceded by: John Redwood
- Succeeded by: Neil Hamilton; The Baroness Denton

Chairman of the Public Accounts Committee
- In office 7 June 2001 – 9 June 2010
- Preceded by: Sir David Davis
- Succeeded by: Dame Margaret Hodge

Member of Parliament for Gainsborough Gainsborough and Horncastle (1983–1997)
- Incumbent
- Assumed office 9 June 1983
- Preceded by: Marcus Kimball
- Majority: 3,532 (7.5%)

Personal details
- Born: Edward Julian Egerton Leigh; 20 July 1950 (age 76) London, England
- Party: Conservative
- Spouse: Mary Goodman (m. 1984)
- Children: 6
- Education: University College, Durham (BA)
- Website: edwardleigh.org.uk

Military service
- Allegiance: United Kingdom
- Branch/service: British Army
- Rank: Trooper
- Unit: HAC

Sir Edward Julian Egerton Leigh (born 20 July 1950) is a British Conservative Party politician who has been the member of Parliament (MP) for Gainsborough, previously Gainsborough and Horncastle, since 1983. Parliament's longest-serving MP since 2024, Leigh is styled Father of the House.

Leigh has been called a "serial rebel" has often voted against his own party. He was one of the original Maastricht Rebels and was reportedly sacked for organising Euro-rebels among ministers. In 2003 Leigh opposed military intervention in Iraq; he has since called for those who voted for the Iraq War, and are still seeking to justify their support for it, to be held to account.

Leigh served as the Chairman of the Public Accounts Committee from 2001 to 2010, investigating government waste and seeking value for money in public expenditure. Leigh stepped down at the end of the parliamentary session in 2010, it being customary for an Opposition MP to hold this post. Leigh was knighted in the Queen's 2013 Birthday Honours for "public and political service" and has also been honoured by the French and Italian governments.

A prominent Roman Catholic politician and former President of the Catholic Union of Great Britain, Leigh has edited and authored four books: Right Thinking (1988); The Nation That Forgot God (2008); Monastery of the Mind (2012); and Another Country (2025).

== Early life and career ==
Edward Leigh was born on 20 July 1950 in London, the son of a civil servant, Sir Neville Leigh, and his wife Denise née Branch. Sir Neville served in RAF intelligence during World War Two and was Clerk to the Privy Council between 1974 and 1984. The Leigh family hails from the Cheshire landed gentry family of West Hall, High Legh, descendants of the Egertons, earls of Bridgewater.

Leigh is a descendant of the family of the Roman Catholic martyr, blessed Richard Leigh who was hanged at Tyburn during the Reformation in 1588 for being a Catholic priest, and beatified by Pope Pius XI in 1929.

His maternal grandfather, colonel Cyril Denzil Branch, was a nephew of Nikolai Golitsyn, the last Prime Minister of Imperial Russia.

Leigh was privately educated at The Oratory School and the Lycée Français Charles de Gaulle, before studying history at University College, Durham, graduating in 1972. While at Durham, he served as president of the Durham Union Society and chairman of the university Conservative association.After graduating Leigh was called to the Bar at the Inner Temple and practised in arbitration and criminal law at Goldsmith Chambers (a barristers' chambers), then elected a Fellow of the Chartered Institute of Arbitrators (FCIArb). He also served as an Army Reservist Trooper in the Honourable Artillery Company.

Leigh worked in the private office of Margaret Thatcher from 1976 to 1977 as a political secretary when she was Leader of the Opposition. Elected as a Councillor on Richmond Borough Council in 1974, Leigh was then elected to the Greater London Council, representing Richmond, from 1977 to 1981. He lost his GLC seat to the Liberal candidate, Adrian Slade by 115 votes.

== Parliamentary career ==
Leigh first stood for Parliament at the October 1974 general election, when he unsuccessfully contested Middlesbrough, coming second with 24.4% of the vote behind the incumbent Labour Party MP Arthur Bottomley.

Leigh was elected to Parliament as MP for Gainsborough and Horncastle at the 1983 general election, winning with 50.9% of the vote and a majority of 5,067. He was re-elected as MP for Gainsborough and Horncastle at the 1987 general election with an increased vote share of 53.3% and an increased majority of 9,723.

A strong supporter of Margaret Thatcher, Leigh visited 10 Downing Street with fellow MP Michael Brown on the morning of Thatcher's resignation as Prime Minister in 1990 to try to persuade her to carry on. Although Charles Powell advised them it was a forlorn task, they were nonetheless granted access to the Cabinet which was in process at the time. Leigh and Brown departed 10 Downing Street and walked down Whitehall back to the House of Commons reputedly with "tears in their eyes". After Thatcher resigned, in the ensuing leadership election, Leigh supported Michael Heseltine, under whom he had served at the Department of Trade and Industry (DTI), preferring to support someone who had stabbed Thatcher in the front to those who had stabbed her in the back.

At the 1992 general election, Leigh was again re-elected with an increased vote share of 54% and an increased majority of 16,245.

Leigh served as a Parliamentary Under-Secretary of State under John Major's premiership but was sacked in May 1993 over his opposition to the Maastricht Treaty. Whilst a Minister he was a keen advocate of privatisation of the Post Office. In the 1995 Conservative leadership election, Leigh supported John Redwood.

Leigh's constituency of Gainsborough and Horncastle was abolished prior to the 1997 general election, and replaced with the new constituency of Gainsborough. At this election Leigh was elected, winning the seat with 43.1% of the vote and a majority of 6,826. He was re-elected as MP for Gainsborough at the 2001 general election with an increased vote share of 46.2% and an increased majority of 8,071.

From 2001 until 2010, Leigh served as Chairman of the Public Accounts Committee, the principal parliamentary body auditing the Budget, investigating government waste and seeking value for money in public expenditure. During his two terms as chairman, the PAC took evidence on 420 separate government projects and programmes and was responsible for saving the taxpayer over £4 billion.

At the 2005 general election, Leigh was again re-elected, with a decreased vote share of 43.9% and a decreased majority of 8,003.

Leigh was President of the socially-conservative Cornerstone Group representing the views of over 40 Conservative Members of Parliament and was author of the group's inaugural pamphlet Faith, Flag and Family in 2005.

In October 2006, Leigh was vocal in stating that after David Cameron became leader of the party, core supporters were drifting away from voting Conservative. Nonetheless, his effective chairmanship of the Public Accounts Committee led to the rejuvenation of his parliamentary career.

Early in 2008, as Chairman of the PAC, Leigh was embarrassed by relying on flawed Department for Transport (DfT) statistics to attack motorcyclists for tax evasion. Accusing 38% of motorcyclists of evading vehicle excise duty, he later apologised for this following the admission by the DfT that 95.5% of motorcycles are entirely legal.

At the 2010 general election, Leigh was again re-elected, with an increased vote share of 49.3% and an increased majority of 10,559.

From 2010 to 2011, Leigh served as an Independent Financial Advisor to HM Treasury, appointed by George Osborne to bring external challenge to the development and implementation of a new financial management strategy for central government. He stood down in 2011, but was then reappointed to report directly to the Chancellor of the Exchequer on improving Parliament's financial scrutiny of the Budget. He was a member of the Treasury Financial Reporting & Advisory Board and, in 2010, Leigh became a delegate to the Parliamentary Assembly of the Council of Europe, speaking regularly and serving on the Culture, Science, Education and Media Committee. Leigh also supported Boris Johnson's call to George Osborne in 2011 for lowering the rate of taxation in the UK so as to assist its economic recovery following the credit crunch.

At the end of 2010 Leigh was offered but declined the British ambassadorship to the Holy See. Leigh, an Assembly Member of the Council of Europe, opposed further human rights legislation, as proposed by the European Court of Human Rights.

In 2011, Leigh was appointed Chairman of the Public Accounts Commission, the body which audits the National Audit Office.

In 2012, Leigh, together with a record number of fellow Conservative MPs, including numerous Privy Counsellors, successfully voted against the Coalition Government's attempted railroading of House of Lords reform by limiting time for meaningful parliamentary debate on this major constitutional issue.

In September 2014, Leigh criticised the Government's decision to allow Mitochondrial replacement therapy to prevent the birth of the children with incurable diseases such as muscular dystrophy. These diseases affect up to 1 in 6,500 babies which Leigh stated could lead to people being "harvested for their parts" and a divide between what he referred to as "the modified and the unmodified". The Department for Health asserted no genetic modification is involved.

In 2015, the French President François Hollande appointed him to the Légion d'honneur for his role as "a bridge between our parliaments, our governments and our societies", as stated by Ambassador Sylvie Bermann at his investiture.

Sir Edward was again re-elected at the 2015 general election with an increased vote share of 52.7% and an increased majority of 15,449.

In March 2016, he joined three other Conservative MPs in "talking out" a Bill introduced by Green Party MP Dr Caroline Lucas, which aimed to reverse moves to privatise the NHS. By filibustering for three and a half hours, Lucas was left with just 17 minutes to present her Bill, which was subsequently shelved without a vote.

Leigh was again returned to Parliament at the snap 2017 general election with an increased vote share of 61.8% and an increased majority of 17,023. He was one of 21 MPs who, in March 2019, voted against LGBT-inclusive sex and relationship education in English schools.

Re-elected at the 2019 general election, with an increased vote share of 66.4% and an increased majority of 22,967, in August 2020, Leigh suggested that the UK take back Calais to prevent migrants seeking asylum by crossing the English Channel from France.

On 1 March 2022, Leigh praised Home Secretary Priti Patel's 'proportionate response' over admission of refugees into the UK from the Russian invasion of Ukraine. Speaking in the Commons, Sir Edward urged the Government "to listen to the voices of people from, for instance in Lincolnshire, where we feel we have done our bit in terms of migration from eastern Europe where we are under extreme pressure in terms of housing and jobs." Despite receiving criticism for these remarks by Labour councillors on Lincolnshire County Council, at the 2024 general election, Leigh was again re-elected, albeit with a decreased vote share of 35.6% and a decreased majority of 3,532.

Succeeding Sir Peter Bottomley as Father of the House after the election, in July 2024, Leigh acted as Temporary Deputy Speaker during the re-election of Speaker Lindsay Hoyle.

== Views ==
Leigh is a Roman Catholic, and maintains a personal blog called Thoughts from a Christian perspective. He is a Patron of the Latin Mass Society, which promotes the use of the 1962 form of the Mass. He supports socially conservative causes in Parliament to promote what he sees as traditional family values, including introducing policies to reduce the tax burden on working families. He has argued for tightening of abortion law regarding human embryonic research.

He defended Section 28 and opposed the Civil Partnership Act 2004, voting against it in Parliament at its Second Reading. Leigh later proposed an amendment to extend the property and pension rights afforded by civil partnerships to siblings who had lived together for more than 12 years. This was opposed by many backers of the initial Bill, such as fellow Conservative MP Sir Alan Duncan, who dubbed it a wrecking amendment. He voted against amendments to the Health and Social Care Bill which permanently legalised at-home medical abortions.

Following an interim report on the connections between colonialism and properties now in the care of the National Trust, including links with historic slavery, Leigh was among the signatories of a letter to The Telegraph in November 2020 from the "Common Sense Group" of Conservative Parliamentarians. The letter accused the National Trust of being "coloured by cultural Marxist dogma, colloquially known as the 'woke agenda'".

Leigh identifies as a socially Conservative Thatcherite and believes in "free enterprise, deregulation, low taxation and a smaller state". In June 2018 he suggested reforming the National Health Service, stating: "I personally feel we have to look at social insurance, which they have in France and Germany, because there is no room for increases in general taxation."

During the COVID lockdown, Leigh advocated for keeping churches open for worship, arguing that there was no scientific evidence to justify a total ban on public worship.

In June 2023, Leigh, along with Conservative MPs Sir Christopher Chope and Ian Liddell-Grainger, were photographed with the Hungarian prime minister Viktor Orbán at a gathering of the European Conservatives Group and Democratic Alliance, an increasingly populist block in the Council of Europe's parliamentary assembly. Christine Jardine, Cabinet spokesperson for the Liberal Democrats, condemned the image, stating: "Conservative MPs should not be cosying up to a far-right leader who has enforced homophobic and anti-democratic policies."

In November 2024, Leigh co-wrote a piece in The Guardian with Labour MP Diane Abbott opposing Terminally Ill Adults (End of Life) on Assisted Suicide Bill.

=== Opposition to Conservative leadership ===
On a number of occasions Leigh has voted against the leadership of his party where it conflicts with his personal principles. In 2003, Leigh rebelled against the leadership of his own party and the Labour government to oppose military intervention in Iraq in 2003. He was one of only 15 Conservative rebels who opposed it at the time.

Since the 2016 European Union Referendum, Leigh has supported Brexit.

In October 2017, the House of Commons overwhelmingly passed an Opposition motion to delay the introduction of Universal Credit and iron out problems with the system first. Leigh strongly criticised the Government decision to ignore the vote, stating: "the road to tyranny is paved by executives ignoring parliaments."

=== Speakership elections ===
A veteran backbencher, Leigh was encouraged to run for the speakership of the House of Commons, and after the 2010 general election for one of the Deputy Speakerships, but chose not to stand then as parliamentary convention was that governing party members were not to be elected to such offices unless already in situ.

Leigh ran for the speakership of the House of Commons in 2019 after Speaker John Bercow retired; he stated that, if elected Speaker, he would be fair to all sides and assume a traditional role. He was eliminated after receiving 12 votes in the first ballot.

=== All-Party Parliamentary Groups ===
Fluent in French, Leigh currently serves as Chairman of the All-Party Parliamentary Group on France and the All-Party Parliamentary Group on Italy, delivering a speech in Italian at the Palace of Westminster to visiting Deputies of the Italian Parliament. He is also the Chairman of the new All-Party Parliamentary Group on Russia, Secretary of the All-Party Parliamentary Group on Insurance, and Chairman of the Foreign Affairs, Defence, and International Development subcommittee of the 1922 Committee.

== Honours ==
Leigh arms

Leigh received the accolade of the Realm for "public and political service":

- Knight Bachelor (2013)
- Officier of the Légion d'honneur (2015)
- Commander of the Order of the Star of Italy (2017)
- Knight of Honour and Devotion of the Sovereign Military Order of Malta (1994)
- Knight Commander of the Order of St. Gregory the Great (KCSG) (2026)
- Privy Counsellor (13 February 2019).

== Personal life ==
Leigh married Mary Goodman in London on 25 September 1984, the granddaughter of Countess Maria von Carlow and great-granddaughter of Duke Georg Alexander of Mecklenburg-Strelitz through her mother, and the great-grandchild of the Arts patron Lady Ottoline Morrell and British politician Philip Morrell, through her father.

Sir Edward and Lady Leigh have six children (Natalia, Tamara Shah, Benedict, Marina, Nicholas, and Theodore) and divide their time between homes in Westminster and his Lincolnshire constituency. Their three eldest children work for HM Government as civil servants. The family are parishioners at the Brompton Oratory, Westminster Cathedral in London and Holy Rood Church in Market Rasen, in his Gainsborough constituency, and members of the Serpentine Swimming Club.

Suffering from the skin condition rosacea, Sir Edward spoke out in March 2020 about being mocked on social media for his appearance.

Parliament of the United Kingdom
Preceded by Marcus Kimball	Member of Parliament for Gainsborough and Horncastle; 1983–1997	Constituency abolished
New constituency	Member of Parliament for Gainsborough; 1997–present	Incumbent
Political offices
Preceded by Sir David Davis	Chairman of the Public Accounts Committee; 2001–2010	Succeeded by Dame Margaret Hodge
Honorary titles
Preceded by Sir Peter Bottomley	Father of the House; 2024–present	Incumbent
