= Diana Vicezar =

Paraguayan entrepreneur (born 2001)

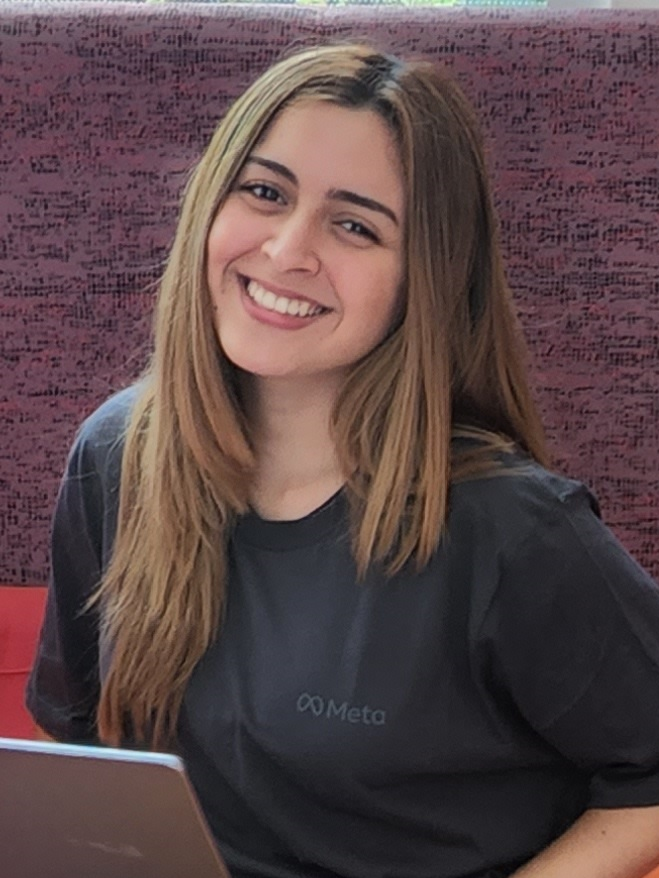
- Vicezar in 2022
- Born: 2001 (age 24–25); Asunción, Paraguay
- Education: Pitzer College; University College Cork
- Occupations: Digital entrepreneur, community activist
- Awards: Diana Award Roll of Honour (2020); Outstanding Young People of Paraguay Awards (2023)
- Website: dianavicezar.com

Diana Monserrat Vicezar Torres (born 2001) is a Paraguayan community activist and entrepreneur. She founded an animal welfare organization as a teenager, before founding an online platform and a podcast. In 2020, she was added to the Diana Award Roll of Honour for her work.

== Career ==
In 2017, aged 16, Vicezar established Mymba Rayhu, a community-based organisation in Paraguay focusing on sustainability and animal welfare. Paraguay has a large issue with feral or abandoned dogs, as well as with plastic pollution. Vicezar established Mymba Rayhu to build shelter for these free-ranging dogs using wholly recycled materials, especially plastics. In 2018, she received the Asunción Youth Excellence Award. By 2019, the organisation had three international chapters; in the same year Vicezar was the recipient of a Global Teen Leader Award for the project. In 2020 she was added to the Diana Award Roll of Honour for her volunteer work.

While a student at Pitzer College, Vicezar established Mapis, an online career platform. The platform aimed to support international students by helping them to access career opportunities in the United States. Its beta version launched in 2022. The same year she became the first Paraguayan to work as a product design intern at Meta. In 2023, whilst studying at University College Cork (Ireland), Vicezar launched a podcast, 'La Sociedad', the first podcast to record and share the experiences of Hispanic and Latin-American students in Ireland.

In 2021, she represented Paraguay at the #Youth4Climate conference. In 2023, she was a recipient of an Outstanding Young People of Paraguay Award from the Junior Chamber International of Asunción.

== Personal life ==
Vicezar is originally from Asunción. She has credited much of her success abroad due to an early opportunity to study English.
