= Tessy Ojo =

Nigerian chief executive

Theresa "Tessy" Ojo (born March 1971) is a British-Nigerian charity executive, who is Chief Executive of the Diana Award. She is also a trustee of Comic Relief, and a member of the Appeals Advisory Committee of the British Broadcasting Corporation (BBC). She has a bachelor's degree in biochemistry and a Master of Business Administration (MBA) degree, and first worked in the corporate sector before moving into charity work.

In the 2020 Queen's Birthday Honours, Ojo was appointed Commander of the Order of the British Empire (CBE) for services to young people.

In 2021, Ojo joined the advisory board of the international organization Awareness 360.
