= European Federation of Neurological Societies =

International medical association (1991–2014)

The European Federation of Neurological Societies was an organisation that united and supported neurologists across the whole of Europe. As of 2013, 45 European national neurological societies were registered members of the EFNS, and the federation represented more than 19,000 European neurologists. It was founded in 1991 in Vienna, Austria.

In June 2014 the federation, together with the European Neurological Society, founded the European Academy of Neurology. Both parent organisations were dissolved at the same time.

The European Federation of Neurological Societies (EFNS) was a different organization from the European Federation of Neurological Associations (EFNA). "Although EFNA [was] not an official member of the Federation [EFNS], it [did] work closely with the EFNS."

== Member societies ==
- Albanian Society of Neurology
- Armenian Scientific-Practical Union of Neurologists
- Austrian Society of Neurology (Österreichische Gesellschaft für Neurologie)
- Belarusian Scientific Society of Neurologists
- Association of Neurologists in Bosnia and Herzegovina
- Bulgarian Society of Neurology
- Croatian Neurological Society (Hrvatsko Neurolosko Drustvo)
- Cyprus Neurological Society
- Czech Neurological Society
- Danish Neurological Society (Dansk Neurologisk Selskab)
- Estonian Ludvig puusepp Society of Neurologists & Neurosurgeons
- Macedonian Society of Neurology
- Finnish Neurological Association (Suomen Neurologinen Yhdistys)
- French Society of Neurology (Société Francaise Neruologie)
- Georgian Society of Neurologists
- German Society of Neurology (Deutsche Gesellschaft für Neurologie)
- Hellenic Neurological Society
- Hungarian Society of Neurology and Psychiatry
- Icelandic Neurological Society
- Irish Institute of Clinical Neuroscience
- Israel Neurological Association
- Italian Society of Neurology (Società Italiana di Neurologia)
- Latvian Neurologists Association
- Lithuanian Neurological Association
- Luxembourg Society of Neurology (Société Luxembourgeoise de Neurologie)
- Moldovan Scientific Society of Neruologists
- Montenegrin Neurological Association
- Norwegian Neurological Association
- Polish Neurological Society
- Portuguese Society of Neurology (Sociedade Portuguesa de Neurologia)
- Romanian Society of Neurology
- All-Russian Society of Neurologists
- Neurological Society of Serbia
- Slovak Neurological Society
- Slovenian Society of Neurology
- Spanish Society of Neurology (Sociedad Espanola de Neurologia)
- Swedish Neurological Society
- Swiss Society of Neurology (Société Suisse de Neurologie)
- Netherlands Society of Neurology (Nederlandse Verenigung voor Neurologie)
- Turkish Neurological Society
- Scientific Society of Neurologists of the Ukraine
- Association of British Neurologists
- National Neurological Society of Uzbekistan

== Publications ==
- Archive of the EFNS
- eBrain
- EFNS Directory
- European Journal of Neurology
- EFNS Guideline Papers
- Handbook of Neurological Management Volume 1 and 2
- Neuropenews
