= Angela Busheska =

Macedonian climate activist and technology researcher

- Born: Struga, North Macedonia
- Education: Lafayette College; Harvard Business School
- Occupations: Social entrepreneur, activist, researcher
- Organization(s): EnRoute, United Nations, Microsoft Research
- Awards: Forbes 30 Under 30; Diana Award; National Geographic Young Explorer
- Website: https://angelabusheska.com

Angela Busheska (Ангела Бушеска) is a Macedonian climate activist, social entrepreneur, and researcher. She is the founder of EnRoute, an organization and mobile application designed to help users reduce their carbon footprint through sustainable transport and fashion choices. Busheska was named to the Forbes 30 Under 30 Europe list in 2022. She is serving as a member of the United Nations Youth Advisory Group on Climate Change for two years from August 2025.

== Early life and education ==
Angela Busheska was born and raised in a low-income family in Struga, North Macedonia.

As a child, she was a competitive mathematician. In 2017, she won a bronze medal at the Genius Olympiad in Oswego, New York, for her project about an environmentally friendly smart city. She represented North Macedonia on the International Young Physicists' Tournament. She turned to climate activism after her aunt died of cardiovascular complications worsened by the severe air pollution in Skopje.

Busheska secured a scholarship to a private high school before receiving a scholarship to study in the United States. She took a gap year in 2020, during which she taught herself computer programming and founded her non-profit, EnRoute. She subsequently enrolled at Lafayette College in Easton, Pennsylvania, where she became the first woman in 30 years to pursue a dual major in electrical engineering and computer science.

She is an incoming member of Harvard Business School's class of 2027.

== Activism and career ==
=== EnRoute ===
In 2020, during the COVID-19 pandemic, Busheska founded EnRoute, a non-profit organization and mobile app. The app was designed to combat air pollution and fast fashion by calculating the carbon footprint of daily activities, such as commuting and shopping. It encourages users to choose greener transport options and avoid "greenwashed" fashion brands.

Under her leadership, EnRoute grew to include over 80,000 users across 120 countries and established a network of student ambassadors globally. By 2022, the platform was credited with helping users offset approximately 180,000 kilograms of carbon emissions.

=== Research ===
Busheska has conducted significant research at the intersection of artificial intelligence and climate adaptation. As a researcher at Microsoft Research, she invented TerraTrace, a system that utilizes satellite imagery, NDVI signatures, and large language models (LLMs) to track land use and deforestation. The system was designed to help governments and small farmers comply with the European Union Deforestation Regulation (EUDR). The system is patent-pending.

Beyond her work in climate technology, Busheska has contributed to research in structural health monitoring, using machine learning and thermography to detect cracks in buildings. She has also explored the intersection of robotics and neuroscience, co-authoring a paper on hybrid brain-computer interfaces (BCI) for robotic device navigation. Her academic work extends to spatial visualization in virtual reality and applying machine learning for agricultural yield prediction.

=== Advocacy ===
Busheska has represented North Macedonia and global youth at major international forums.

In September 2021, Busheska represented North Macedonia as a youth delegate at the "Youth4Climate: Driving Ambition" event in Milan, where she contributed to the drafting of the Youth Climate Declaration ahead of COP26. Following this, in October 2021, she moderated and spoke at the Youth Climate Summit in Skopje, organized by UNICEF and several embassies, where the youth declaration was further discussed.

In 2022, she was selected to join the Youth Advisory Group of the Social Enterprise World Forum (SEWF) and has addressed the forum as a speaker. That same year, she partnered with the Nurture Nature Center as an inaugural Proctor Fellow to help activate the Climate Action Plan for Easton, Pennsylvania. She also serves on the Advisory Board of the climate education non-profit Take Action Global.

In 2023, she participated in the ActNowFilm, a project showcased at COP28, where she was paired in conversation with climate scientist Emily Shuckburgh.

In August 2025, she was appointed to the expanded third cohort of the United Nations Secretary-General's Youth Advisory Group on Climate Change, a group of 14 young leaders advising on global climate strategy. She also served as an LLDC Youth Leader, addressing the 24th Annual Ministerial Meeting of Foreign Ministers of Landlocked Developing Countries in September 2025.

Busheska has spoken at high-profile events such as the One Young World Summit in Manchester, UN Digital Cooperation Day, Climate Action Day, and WSIS Forum. She has also been interviewed by national media outlets in North Macedonia, including Sitel Television and Televizija 24. She was a featured speaker at the International Union for Conservation of Nature Conservation Congress, and a speaker at the UN Goals Lounge.

She was an expert consultant through the Youth To The Table partnership between SAP, and We Are Family Foundation.

== Recognition ==
Busheska has received international recognition for her work in climate technology and social entrepreneurship:

- 2020 Successful Youth Award, awarded by the President of North Macedonia, Stevo Pendarovski, in the Young Talent category
- 2021 Diana Award
- 2021 National Geographic Young Explorer
- 2021 Global Teen Leader, awarded by the We Are Family Foundation
- 2021 Wonder Grant, awarded by the Shawn Mendes Foundation
- 2021 WSA European Young Innovator
- 2022 Forbes 30 Under 30 Europe
- 2023 Greentech Festival Youngster
- 2024 Glamour College Woman of the Year (2024)
- 2024 Ambition Accelerator, awarded by the Taco Bell Foundation
- 2024 Green Carpet Fashion Awards: Young Leader Honoree
- 2026 Space For Humanity Zero Gravity Science Communicator
