= Pritchard Englefield =

Law firms based in London

Pritchard Englefield (now Irwin Mitchell LLP and formerly Thomas Eggar LLP)
- Offices: 14 New Street; London, United Kingdom (until 2016)
- Major practice areas: Arbitration; Banking law; Commercial litigation; Conflicts of law; Corporate and commercial law; Employment law; Family law; Intellectual property; Pensions; Personal injury; Product liability; Property law; Trusts and Probate
- Website: www.thomaseggar.com

Pritchard Englefield, was a medium-sized commercial law firm in the City of London. On 1 May 2013, it merged with Thomas Eggar LLP, a law firm with origins in Sussex and which operated out of offices in London, Sussex, Berkshire and Hampshire, and headquartered in Crawley. In 2016, Thomas Eggar merged with Irwin Mitchell LLP, a UK law firm with origins in Sheffield. This took the number of Irwin Mitchell offices nationally to 17 and in London the merged offices operate from 40 Holborn Viaduct.

Pritchard Englefield was based in the city from the date of its foundation in 1848 by HD Pritchard, initially at Painters Hall, where Mr Pritchard and his partner Mr Englefield became Joint Clerks to the Painter Stainers Company, and finally in New Street, just off Bishopsgate although the firm located to the West End of London for a period (1971-1992). The 165th anniversary of the firm fell in 2013, just before the merger.

After World War II, the firm grew by merger and bolt-on. It was guided by managing partners such as A.D. Englefield and Julian Tobin, and enriched by German-speaking émigré lawyers from Central Europe from the 1930s, including Rudolf Graupner and Hans Marcus. It was the first UK law firm to enter Germany after World War II, opening an office in Hamburg (1946) and Frankfurt (1990), while alliances were also formed in Hong Kong and Guernsey.

== Practice ==
Pritchard Englefield became particularly well known for its UK and European commercial law practice and an insurance arm, acting for European insurance companies. Fluency in German and French, and dual-qualified German lawyers, came to characterise the practice. Fluency in either French or German also became a requirement for trainee solicitors on recruitment.

The firm's main practice areas focused on corporate and commercial law, intellectual property, banking law, property law, commercial litigation and arbitration, product liability, employment law, conflicts of law, pensions, personal injury, family law, and international private clients.

Pritchard Englefield also formed part of the PLG and ILG, loose groupings of independent international law firms.
