= Diana Award =

Award for young people

- Awarded for: "Young people who work to improve the lives of others"
- Location: 33 Queen Street; London, England EC4R 1AP
- Country: United Kingdom
- Hosted by: Tessy Ojo (CEO); Rebecca Crook (Chair); David Cameron (Patron)
- First award: 1999
- Winners: Georgina Lara Booth; Asafa Powell; Angelo Cardona; Christy Zakarias; Sophie Pender; Aishwarya Sridhar; Jawid Amani
- Website: www.diana-award.org.uk

The Diana Award is an international award that honours young people who work to improve the lives of others. Named after Diana, Princess of Wales, the Diana Award was established in 1999 by a board chaired by Gordon Brown.

== History ==
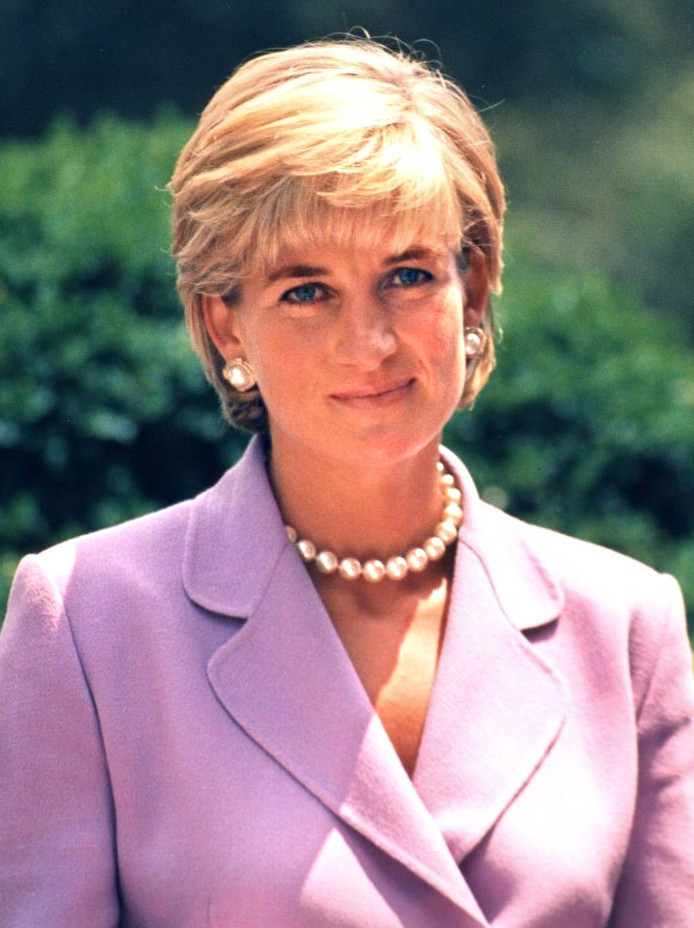
Diana, Princess of Wales in 1997

The award was launched by the former UK Prime Minister Gordon Brown in honour of the late Diana, Princess of Wales.

== Description ==
The Diana Award honours young people who work to improve the lives of others.

The organisation is a charity legacy to Diana, Princess of Wales' belief that young people have the power to change the world. The purpose of the Diana Award is to appreciate and celebrate the work which young people make to society – those who are young ambassadors, young leaders, young humanitarians, fundraisers, environmental campaigners, peer mentors, sports leaders and those who inspire others. The vision is to empower young people to change the world, promoting a culture that celebrates young people from all sections of society who have made a selfless contribution to society.

Patrons of the Diana Award include former prime minister David Cameron, Dame Julia Samuel, former Scottish First Minister Jack McConnell, and Esther Rantzen.

== Winners ==
Award winners include:

- Asafa Powell, Jamaican (2012)
- Georgina Lara Booth, British-Dutch (2013)
- Christy Zakarias, Indonesian (2013)
- Rona Glynn-McDonald, Australian (2019)
- Aishwarya Sridhar, Indian (2019)
- Sophie Pender, British (2020)
- Diana Vicezar, Paraguayan (2020)
- Angela Busheska, Macedonian (2021)
- Angelo Cardona, Colombian (2021)
- Jawid Amani, Afghan (2023)
- Olivier Uwishema, Rwandan (2024)
