= Bates Wells Braithwaite =

Law firms of the United Kingdom

Bates Wells & Braithwaite London
- Headquarters: London, United Kingdom
- No. of offices: 1
- No. of lawyers: 120
- Major practice areas: Commercial, charity
- Date founded: 1970
- Founder: Andrew Phillips (Lord of Sudbury)
- Company type: Limited liability partnership
- Website: www.bateswells.co.uk

Bates Wells (officially Bates Wells & Braithwaite London LLP) is a law firm based in London, United Kingdom. The London-based firm employs around 130 people with specialists covering all areas of law.

== Overview ==
The firm was founded by Andrew Phillips (Lord of Sudbury) in 1970.

Bates Wells helped in the development of Big Society Capital, the social investment bank founded by Sir Ronald Cohen in 2012. The firm also had a major role in establishing Charity Bank, a financial institution that lends to charities and social enterprises, as well as in helping to develop the definition of a Community Interest Company.

Bates Wells is acknowledged by the United Kingdom's two independent directories, Legal 500 and Chambers UK in 21 areas.

The firms is a co-founder of "trans-Europe" lawyers network, the Parlex Group and UK's Legal Action Group,

== Notable clients ==
According to Charity Financials, Bates Wells is listed as an adviser in the accounts of 368 of the United Kingdom's 5,000 largest charities. High-profile charities that the firm represents total £7.6bn and include Cancer Research UK, Arts Council England and Oxfam GB. In 2013, the firm won the business of United Learning Trust and Home Farm Trust. Additional clients include Action Aid, the British Red Cross, Friends of the Earth and Shelter, the firm's first charity client.

== B Corporation certification ==
In August 2015, Bates Wells became the first UK law firm to certify as a B Corporation. "B Corp" status is awarded to "socially conscious businesses that meet externally audited rigorous standards of social and environmental performance, accountability and transparency".

== Equivalent means ==
Bates Wells employed the first paralegal to qualify as a solicitor through equivalent means. Equivalent means was introduced in 2014 as a reform by the Solicitors Regulation Authority (SRA) as part of the Training for Tomorrow programme to recognise experience obtained in the workplace to fulfil the requirements of a formal period of recognised training or a training contract to become a solicitor.
