= 93% Club =

Student-run charity

The 93% Club
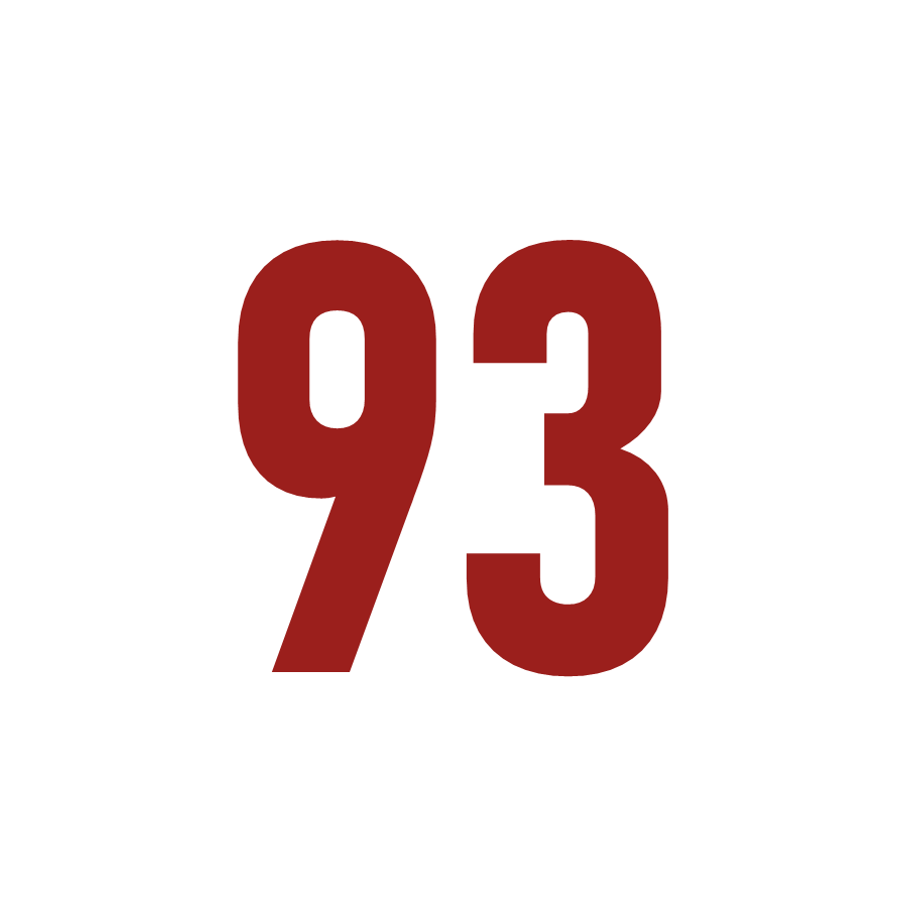
- Logo of the 93% Club
- Founded: April 2016
- Legal status: Charitable incorporated organisation
- Purpose: Education
- Location: United Kingdom
- Members: 17,000
- CEO: Sophie Pender

The 93% Club is a charity that aims to provide opportunities and a network for state school–educated university students in the United Kingdom. It has chapters at 45 universities in the UK and has reached more than 10,000 students.

== History ==
The organisation was founded by Sophie Pender, who graduated from secondary school with three A* grades at A-Level but found her working-class council estate background criticised when she began studying at the University of Bristol in 2014. At that time, more than 35% of students at the university came from private schools.

The 93% in the name refers to the share of British people educated in state schools. Robert Verkaik described the club as a "reverse Bullingdon Club" in The Guardian, placing the organisation in contrast to the exclusive private club at the University of Oxford. The charity intends to counteract the traditional "What school did you go to?" question assumed to allow former private school pupils to get good jobs. It gives advice to students, such as helping them select a hall of residence or explaining that state school undergraduates may have built up resilience and may outperform the privately educated.

The movement attracted increased attention in 2020, when it grew to over 10,000 students in 36 universities. It obtained charitable status that December.

== Reception ==
In June 2021, the charity attracted attention for a social media campaign asking users to share that they are "state school and proud". It also received some hostility, as some of its events were disrupted, and the organisation was criticised as "elitist". Pender rejected these criticisms, saying privately educated students "don't need to set up a 7% club because they already benefit from privileged networks". Other commentators have argued the "educational apartheid" of independent (private) schools is preventing social mobility.
