= Gainsborough and Horncastle =

UK Parliament constituency (1983–1997)

Coordinates: 53.35°N 0.50°W

- Former county constituency for the House of Commons
- Location of Lincolnshire within England
- County: Lincolnshire
- Major settlements: Gainsborough

1983–1997
- Seats: One
- Created from: Gainsborough, Horncastle and Louth
- Replaced by: Gainsborough and Louth & Horncastle

Gainsborough and Horncastle was a county constituency represented in the House of Commons of the Parliament of the United Kingdom. It elected one Member of Parliament (MP) by the first past the post system of election. It existed from 1983 to 1997. The area of and around Horncastle is now in the constituency of Louth and Horncastle.

For elections prior to 1983, and from 1997, see Gainsborough.

== Boundaries ==
The District of West Lindsey, and the District of East Lindsey wards of Binbrook, Donington on Bain, Horncastle, Roughton, Woodhall Spa, and Wragby.

== Members of Parliament ==
Year	Member	Party
1983	Edward Leigh	Conservative
1997	constituency abolished	

== Election results ==
1979 notional result
Party	Vote	%
Conservative	23,304	47.1
Liberal	15,868	32.1
Labour	9,817	19.8
Others	520	1.1
Turnout	49,509	
Electorate		

=== Elections in the 1980s ===
General election 1983: Gainsborough and Horncastle
Party	Candidate	Votes	%	±%
Conservative	Edward Leigh	25,625	50.9	+4.1
Liberal	Andrew Phillips	20,558	40.8	+9.0
Labour	Carl James	3,886	7.7	−12.1
Majority		5,067	10.1	−4.9
Turnout		50,069	75.0	
Registered electors		67,115		
Conservative win (new seat)				

General election 1987: Gainsborough and Horncastle
Party	Candidate	Votes	%	±%
Conservative	Edward Leigh	28,621	53.3	+2.1
Liberal	David Grace	18,898	35.2	−5.9
Labour	Robin Naylor	6,156	11.4	+3.7
Majority		9,723	18.1	+8.0
Turnout		53,675	76.9	+1.9
Registered electors		69,760		
Conservative hold		Swing	+4.0	

=== Elections in the 1990s ===
General election 1992: Gainsborough and Horncastle
Party	Candidate	Votes	%	±%
Conservative	Edward Leigh	31,444	54.0	+0.6
Liberal Democrats	Neil Taylor	15,199	26.1	−9.1
Labour	Fiona Jones	11,619	20.0	+8.5
Majority		16,245	27.9	+9.8
Turnout		58,262	80.9	+3.9
Registered electors		72,038		
Conservative hold		Swing	+4.9	

== Sources ==
- Craig, F. W. S. (1983) [1969]. British parliamentary election results 1918-1949 (3rd ed.). Chichester: Parliamentary Research Services. ISBN 0-900178-06-X.
- Leigh Rayment's Historical List of MPs – Constituencies beginning with "G" (part 1)
