= European Journal of Neurology =

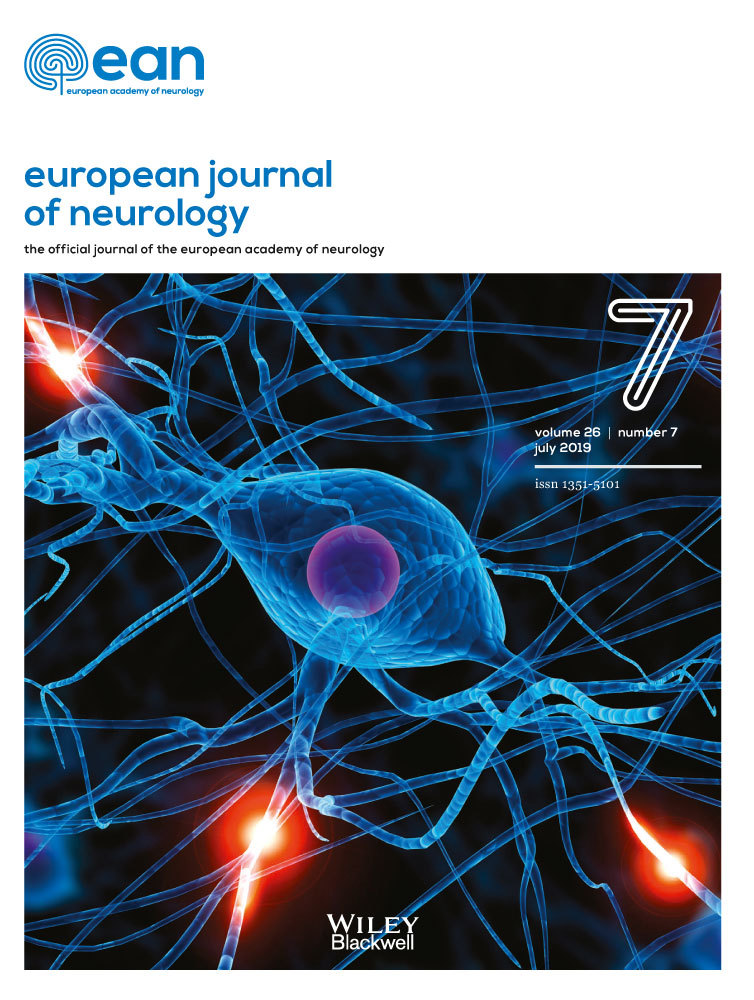
- Discipline: Neurology
- Language: English
- Edited by: Didier Leys

Publication details
- History: 1994-present
- Publisher: Wiley-Blackwell on behalf of the European Academy of Neurology
- Frequency: Monthly
- Impact factor: 6.089 (2020)

Standard abbreviations
- ISO 4: Eur. J. Neurol.

Indexing
- CODEN: EJNEFL
- ISSN: 1351-5101 (print); 1468-1331 (web)
- LCCN: sn95038669
- OCLC no.: 768004591

Links
- Journal homepage; Online access; Online archive

The European Journal of Neurology is a monthly peer-reviewed medical journal that covers all aspects of neurology. It was established in 1994 and is published by Wiley-Blackwell on behalf of the European Academy of Neurology. The editor-in-chief is Didier Leys (Université de Lille).

== Abstracting and indexing ==
The journal is abstracted and indexed in:

- Academic Search
- Biological Abstracts
- BIOSIS Previews
- CAB Abstracts
- CABDirect
- CSA Biological Sciences Database
- Current Contents/Clinical Medicine
- Embase
- Global Health
- Index Medicus/MEDLINE/PubMed
- InfoTrac
- PsycINFO/Psychological Abstracts
- Science Citation Index Expanded
- VINITI Database RAS

According to the Journal Citation Reports, the journal has a 2020 impact factor of 6.089.
