= European Academy of Neurology =

Non-profit organization

- Abbreviation: EAN
- Predecessor: European Neurological Society, European Federation of Neurological Societies
- Formation: 2014; 12 years ago
- Type: Learned society, professional association, Nonprofit
- Location: Vienna, Austria
- Official language: English
- President: Prof. Dr Paul Boon
- President Elect: Prof. Dr Elena Moro
- Executive Director: Anja Sander
- Website: ean.org

The European Academy of Neurology (EAN) is a non-profit organisation that unites and supports neurologists across Europe. Currently, 47 European national neurological societies as well as 4000 individuals are registered members of EAN. Thus, EAN represents more than 45,000 European neurologists.

The EAN was founded during the Joint Congress of European Neurology in June 2014 by the former European Federation of Neurological Societies (EFNS) and European Neurological Society (ENS). The academy's current president is Professor Paul Boon (Ghent, Belgium).

== European Academy of Neurology congress ==
The EAN organises the annual congress of European neurology, which is held in different European cities and is attended by approximately 6,000 international participants.

2014: EFNS–ENS Joint Congress of European Neurology in Istanbul, Turkey. Birthplace of the European Academy of Neurology.

2015: 1st EAN Congress in Berlin, Germany

2016: 2nd EAN Congress in Copenhagen, Denmark

2017: 3rd EAN Congress in Amsterdam, Netherlands

2018: 4th EAN Congress in Lisbon, Portugal

2019: 5th EAN Congress in Oslo, Norway

2020: 6th EAN Congress in Paris, France

2021: 7th EAN Congress in Vienna, Austria

2022: 8th EAN Congress in Vienna, Austria

2023: 9th EAN Congress in Budapest, Hungary

2024: 10th EAN Congress in Helsinki, Finland

2025: 11th EAN Congress in Sevilla, Spain

== Member societies ==
- Albanian Society of Neurology
- Armenian Neurological Association
- Austrian Society of Neurology (Österreichische Gesellschaft für Neurologie)
- National Association of Neurologists of Azerbaijan
- Belarusian Scientific Society of Neurologists
- Belgian Neurological Society
- Association of Neurologists in Bosnia and Herzegovina
- Association of British Neurologists
- Bulgarian Society of Neurology
- Croatian Medical Association - Croatian neurological society
- Cyprus Neurological Society
- Czech Neurological Society
- Danish Neurological Society (Dansk Neurologisk Selskab)
- Estonian Ludvig puusepp Society of Neurologists & Neurosurgeons
- Macedonian Society of Neurology
- Finnish Neurological Association (Suomen Neurologinen Yhdistys)
- French Society of Neurology (Société Française de Neurologie)
- Georgian Union of Neurologists (GEUNE)
- German Society of Neurology (Deutsche Gesellschaft für Neurologie)
- Hellenic Neurological Society
- Hungarian Neurological Society
- Icelandic Neurological Society
- Irish Institute of Clinical Neuroscience
- Israel Neurological Association
- Italian Society of Neurology (Società Italiana di Neurologia)
- Kazakhstan National Association of Neurologists “Neuroscience”
- Kyrgyz Neurological Association
- Latvian Association of Neurologists
- Lithuanian Neurological Association
- Luxembourg Society of Neurology (Société Luxembourgeoise de Neurologie)
- Society of Neurologists of the Republic of Moldova
- Montenegrin Neurological Association
- Norwegian Neurological Association
- Polish Neurological Society
- Portuguese Society of Neurology (Sociedade Portuguesa de Neurologia)
- Romanian Society of Neurology
- All-Russian Society of Neurologists
- Society of Serbian Neurologists
- Slovak Neurological Society
- Slovenian Society of Neurology
- Spanish Society of Neurology (Sociedad Espanola de Neurologia)
- Swedish Neurological Society (Svenska Neurologföreningen)
- Swiss Society of Neurology (Société Suisse de Neurologie)
- The Netherlands Society of Neurology (Nederlandse Verenigung voor Neurologie)
- Turkish Neurological Society
- Association of Neurologists, Psychiatrists and Narcologists of Ukraine
- National Neurological Society of Uzbekistan

== Organisation ==
The European Academy of Neurology consists of an elected/appointed Board, as well as programme, education, liaison and scientific committees. There are 29 subspecialty scientific panels, each responsible for a specific neurological topic:

- ALS and frontotemporal dementia
- Autonomic nervous system disorders
- Child neurology
- Clinical neurophysiology
- Coma and chronic disorders of consciousness
- Dementia and cognitive disorders
- Epilepsy
- Headache
- Higher cortical functions
- Infectious diseases
- Movement disorders
- Multiple sclerosis
- Muscle disorders
- Neurocritical care
- Neuroepidemiology
- Neurogenetics
- Neuroimaging
- Neuroimmunology
- Neuro-oncology
- Neuro-ophthalmology and -otology
- Neuropathies
- Neurorehabilitation
- Neurosonology
- Neurotraumatology
- Pain
- Palliative care
- Sleep-wake disorders
- Stroke
- Translational neurology

== Publications ==
- EANpages
- Archive of the EFNS
- European Journal of Neurology
- EAN Guideline Papers
- Handbook of Neurological Management Volumes 1 and 2
