= Abdullah Gül University =

Public university in Kayseri, Turkey

- Abdullah Gül Üniversitesi
- Motto: Turkish: 3'üncü Nesil Devlet Üniversitesi
- Motto in English: 3rd Generation State University
- Type: Public
- Established: July 21, 2010; 16 years ago
- Affiliations: Magna Charta Universitatum
- Rector: Prof. Dr. Cengiz Yılmaz
- Faculty: 285
- Students: 3439
- Location: Kayseri, Turkey
- Campus: Urban
- Language: English
- Website: w3.agu.edu.tr

Abdullah Gül University (AGU) is a public university located in Kayseri, Turkey. Established in 2010, the university began admitting students in the 2013–2014 academic year. offers twelve undergraduate and eleven graduate programs across five schools. The university’s primary language of instruction is English, a characteristic shared with a limited number of other public universities in Turkey, including Middle East Technical University, Boğaziçi University and İzmir Institute of Technology. The main campus, known as the Sümer Campus, functions as the center for academic and student activities.

In 2022, Abdullah Gül University (AGU) was included among the top 300 institutions in the Times Higher Education Impact Rankings, which evaluate universities’ performance in relation to the United Nations Sustainable Development Goals. The university ranked 29th worldwide in the “Quality Education” category and received notable scores in “Sustainable Cities and Communities,” “Responsible Consumption and Production,” and “Partnerships for the Goals.” AGU has also been reported as ranking first among Turkish public universities in the National University Satisfaction Survey for three consecutive years. In the World’s Universities with Real Impact (WURI) 2023 rankings, AGU was listed 15th globally and was the only institution from Turkey included in that year’s ranking.

== History ==
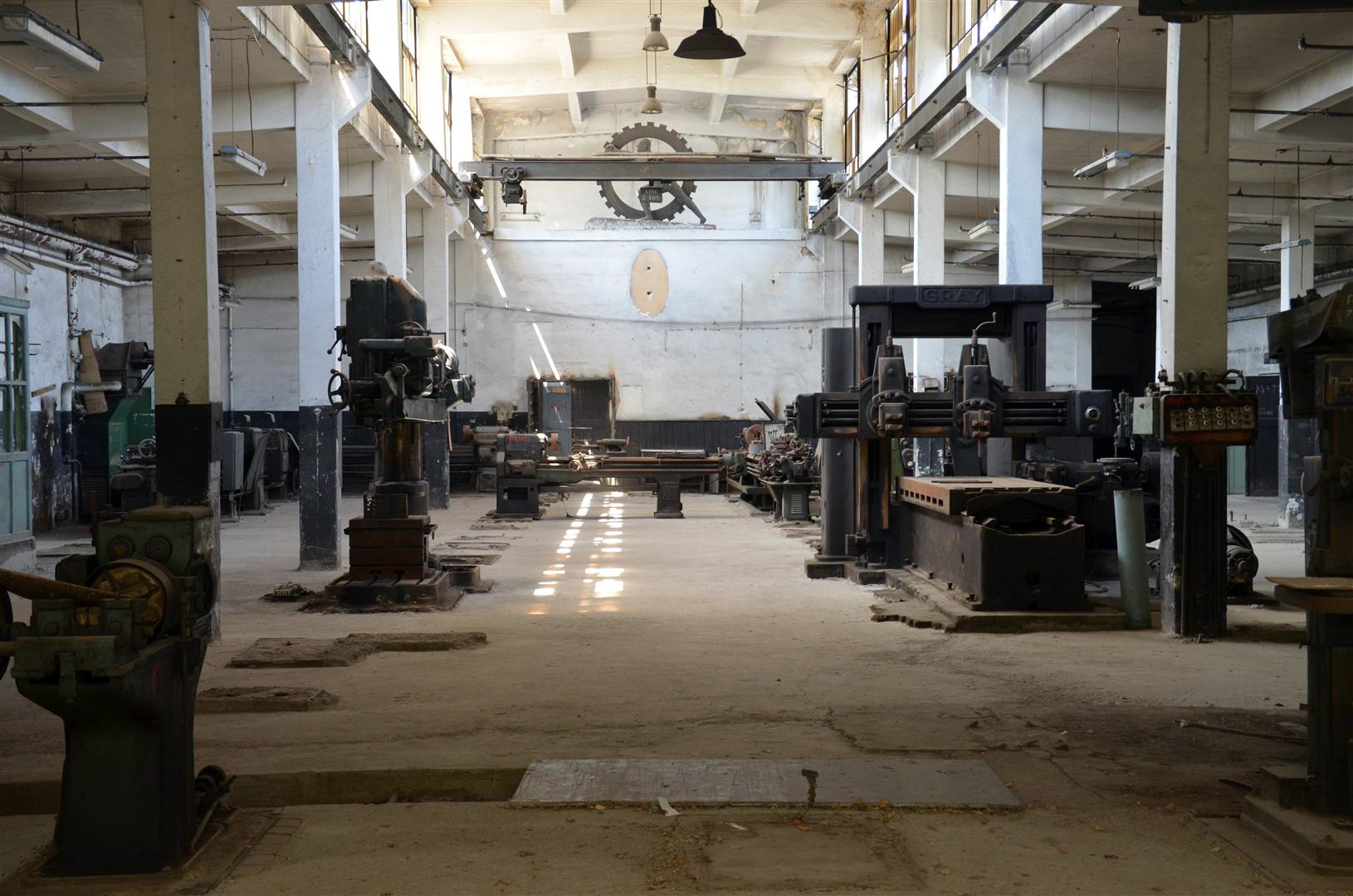
A view of the AGU Old Factory Building, formerly part of the Sümerbank Factory.

The establishment of Abdullah Gül University began in 2007 as a collaborative initiative by the Kayseri City Council and local community leaders, with the objective of expanding higher education opportunities in the region. The university was named after Abdullah Gül, the 11th President of Turkey, with his consent to use his name. AGU was officially founded on 21 July 2010 as Turkey’s first public university supported by a philanthropic foundation. The institution admitted its first cohort of students in the 2013–2014 academic year. The university’s main campus occupies the site of Turkey’s first industrial complex, which has been redeveloped for educational use.

The Abdullah Gül University Foundation was established on 13 July 2011 to provide financial support for students and to contribute to the university’s academic and infrastructural development. The foundation’s activities include offering scholarships, supporting cultural and social initiatives, and funding improvements in physical, technical, and technological resources. İhsan Sabuncuoğlu, formerly affiliated with Bilkent University and Carnegie Mellon University, served as the university’s founding rector.

The Abdullah Gül University Foundation is supported by a group of business leaders and organizations in Turkey. Abdullah Gül, the 11th President of Turkey, serves as the Foundation’s Honorary President. Mustafa Çıkrıkçıoğlu is the President of the Foundation and a member of its Board of Directors.

The Board of Trustees includes Ahmet Kamil Erciyas, Ali Doğramacı, Ali Kibar (Kibar Holding), Bekir Yıldız, Emin Bayraktar, Güler Sabancı (Sabancı Holding), Halit Narin, Hamdi Akın, Hüseyin Bayraktar, İzzet Bayraktar, Mehmet Özhaseki, Mehmet Sayım Tekelioğlu, Memduh Büyükkılıç, Murat Dedeman (Dedeman Group), Mustafa Çelik, Mustafa Çıkrıkçıoğlu, Rifat Hisarcıklıoğlu (Union of Chambers and Commodity Exchanges of Turkey), Süleyman Çetinsaya, Taner Yıldız, Tuncay Özilhan, and Yaşar Küçükçalık.

The Board of Directors includes Ali İsmail Sabancı (Esas Holding), Candan Karlıtekin, Hamdi Akın (Akfen Holding), Mehmet Macit Gül, Mustafa Çıkrıkçıoğlu, and Süleyman Çetinsaya (Çetinsaya Group). The Supervisory Board consists of Emin Bayraktar, Hüseyin Bayraktar, and Tuncay Özilhan (Anadolu Group).

Honorary members and institutional supporters include Hamdi Akın, Ahmet Kibar, Ali İsmail Sabancı, Erman Ilıcak (Rönesans Holding), Ferit Şahenk (Doğuş Holding), Halit Cıngıllıoğlu, Turgay Ciner (Ciner Group), Sema Cıngıllıoğlu, the Kadir Has Foundation, the Kayseri Organized Industrial Zone, TAV Tepe Akfen Investments, and the Vehbi Koç Foundation.

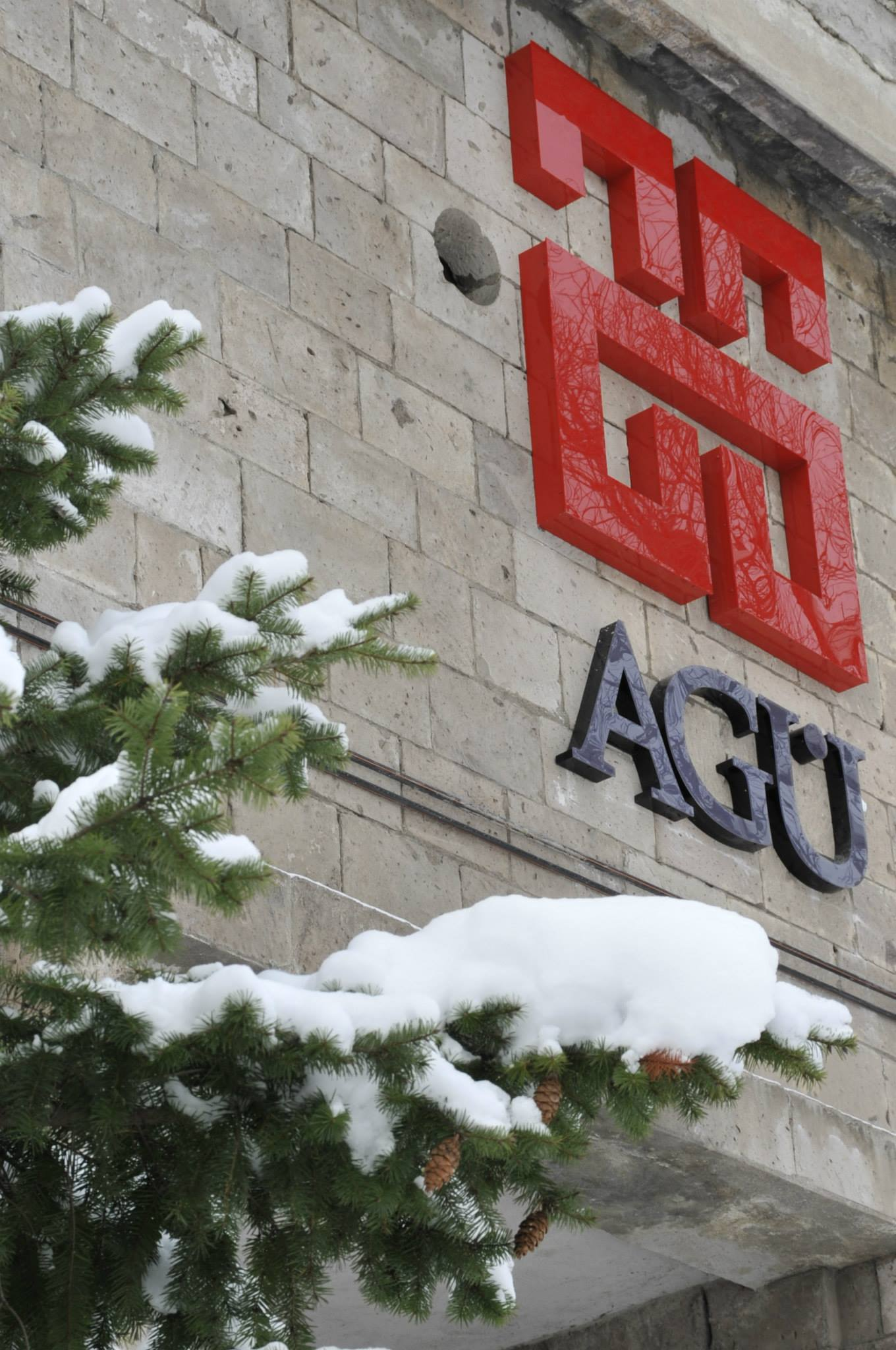
The official logo of Abdullah Gül University is prominently displayed on the façade of a campus building during winter.

Abdullah Gül University describes itself as a third-generation university with an emphasis on social benefit. First-generation universities, established in the Middle Ages, include examples such as the University of Bologna (founded in 1158) and the University of Paris (established in 1200), which focused on disciplines such as theology, law, and medicine. In the 19th century, Humboldtian universities, considered second-generation institutions, emphasized research and specialized in single disciplines. Third-generation universities aim to integrate education, research, and innovation to address societal challenges through a multidisciplinary approach. According to J.G. Wissema of Delft University of Technology, this model functions as a “knowledge network that offers scientific and technical solutions to societal needs at the intersection of education, research, and innovation,” with particular attention to industry collaboration.

== Campus ==
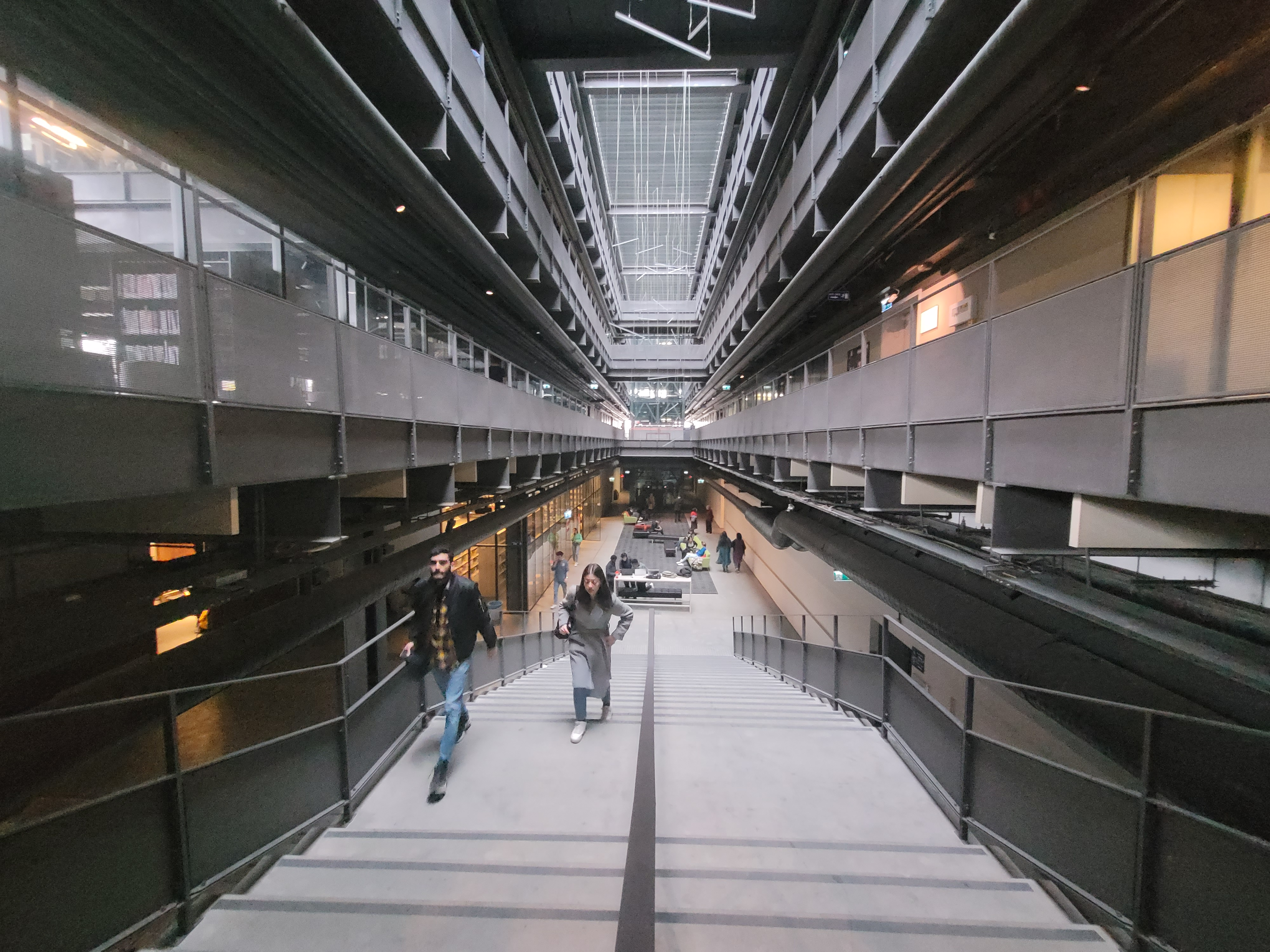
An interior view of Abdullah Gül University, showcasing its architecture after the renovation process.

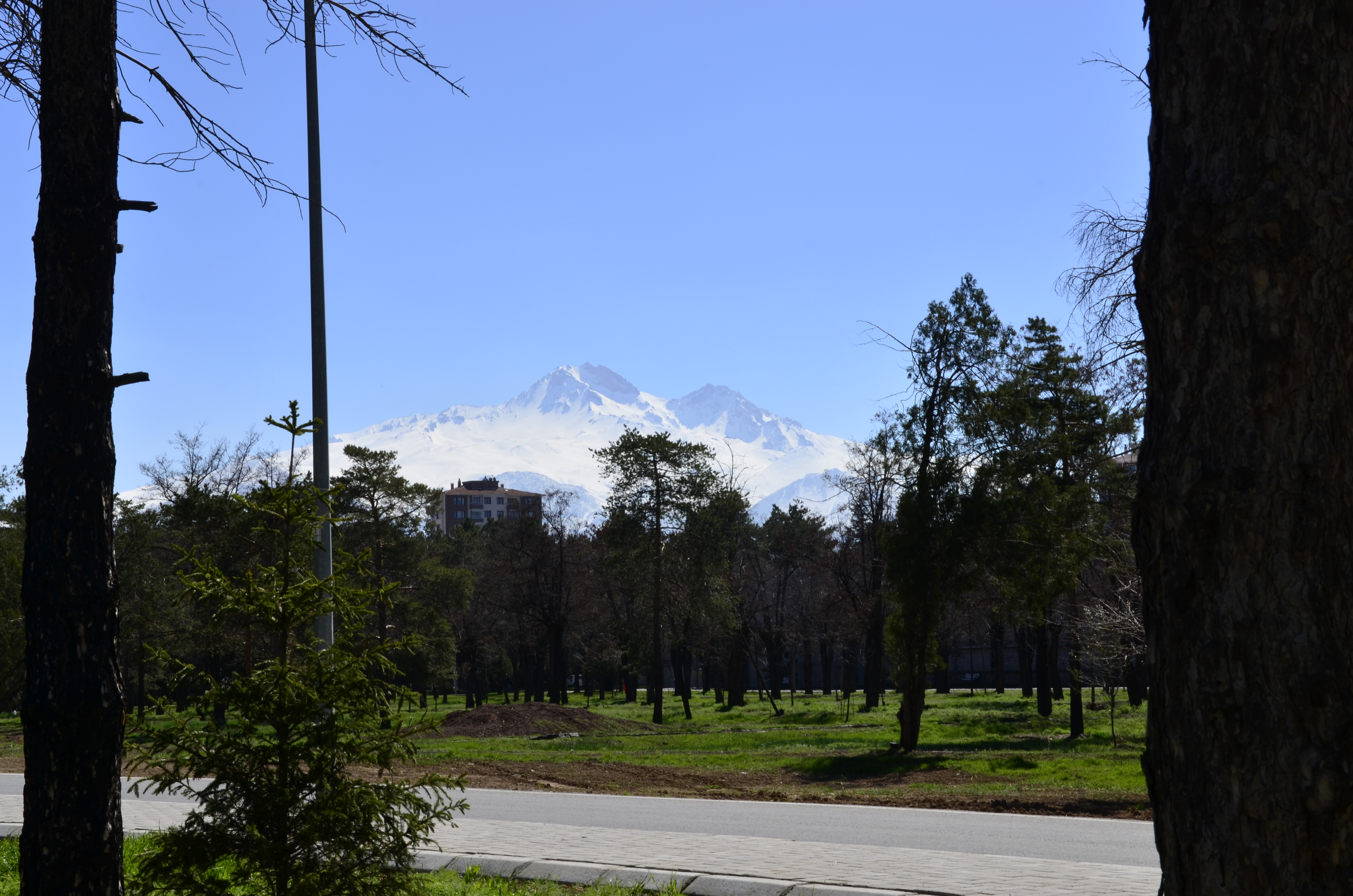
A view of Mount Erciyes is visible from Sümer Campus, with the mountain's peak in the background.

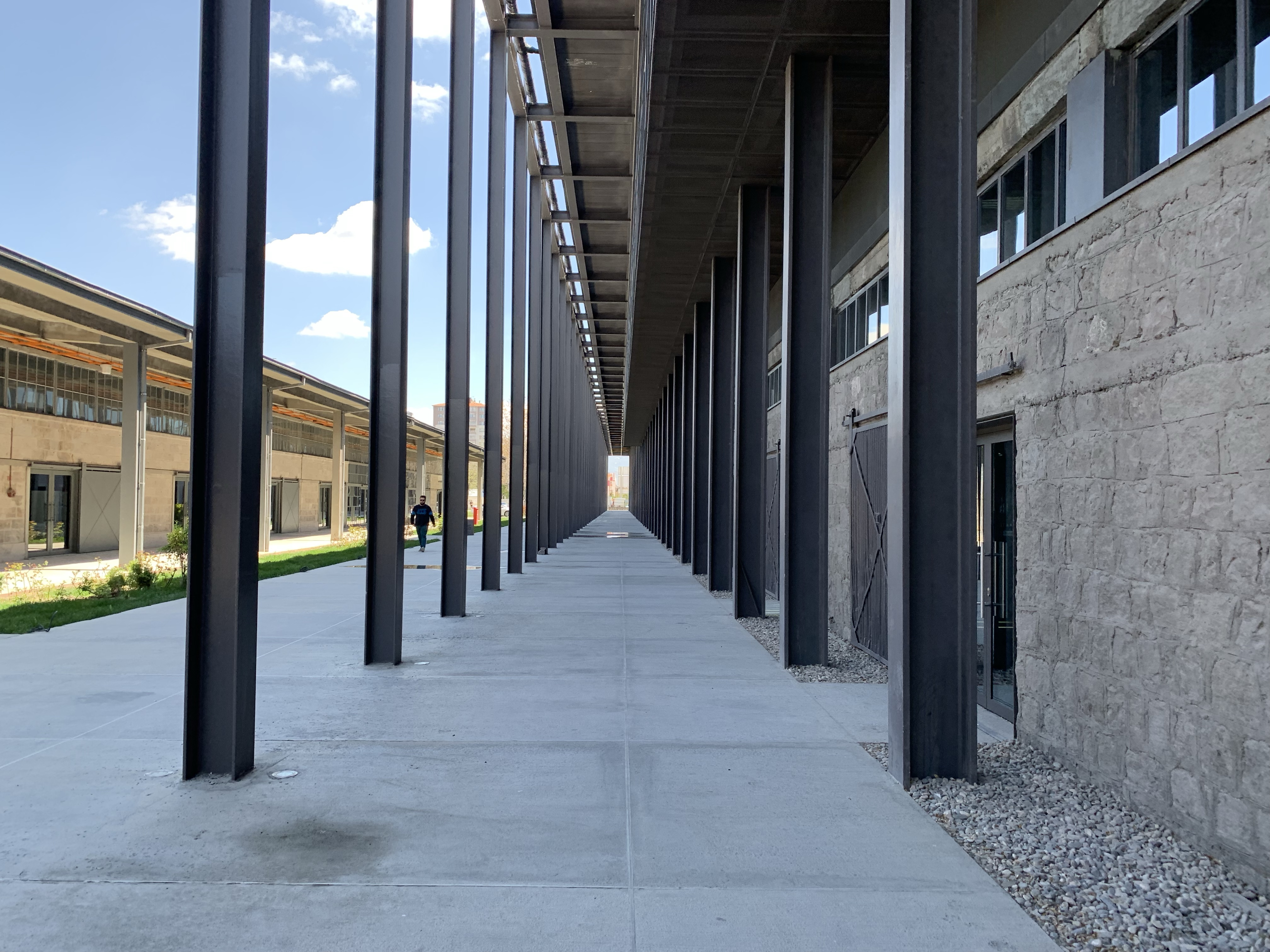
A view of the Abdullah Gül University Sümer Campus.

Sümer Campus is located on a site formerly occupied by the Sümerbank Kayseri Fabric Factory, which was built in 1935 by Russian architect Ivan Nikolaev. The factory was part of Turkey’s early industrialization efforts and was established with a loan of 8.5 million Turkish Liras from the Soviet Union, with technical assistance from Soviet experts invited by Prime Minister İsmet İnönü. The foundation of the factory was laid on 20 May 1934, the building designs were completed in Moscow, and construction was completed in sixteen months. The factory officially opened on 16 September 1935, with İsmet İnönü presiding over the inauguration.

In May 2012, the Sümerbank Kayseri Fabric Factory site was allocated to Abdullah Gül University, with the transfer completed on 15 June 2012. Since admitting its first students in 2013, the university has used the site for educational purposes. The Sümer Campus is being restored in successive stages and is planned to include social and cultural spaces to facilitate interaction with the surrounding city. The campus covers approximately 340 acres of open space and 80 acres of built-up area. It was designed by architect Emre Arolat, a recipient of the Aga Khan Award for Architecture and the RIBA International Award. The campus received the first prize in the Education Buildings category at the 2012 World Architecture Festival.

Adjacent to the campus, the Sümer Evleri residential area is located near municipal and public service buildings, including the Kayseri City Courthouse, Kayseri Chief Police Department, and Kayseri Tax Directorate, as well as recreational facilities such as the Sümer Sports Centre and Sümer Tennis Courts. The area is primarily inhabited by faculty and local residents and includes commercial and public amenities such as cafés, restaurants, and parks.

Abdullah Gül University includes the Abdullah Gül Presidential Museum and Library on its campus. The museum and library were created through the conversion of two buildings, the Electric Power Plant and the Steam Power Plant, beginning in 2013. The Steam Power Plant was adapted into an information center linked to the museum’s library and archival space. Exhibition design and curation were carried out by Ralph Appelbaum Associates. The museum and library, opened by President Abdullah Gül, provide a collection related to Turkey’s political history.

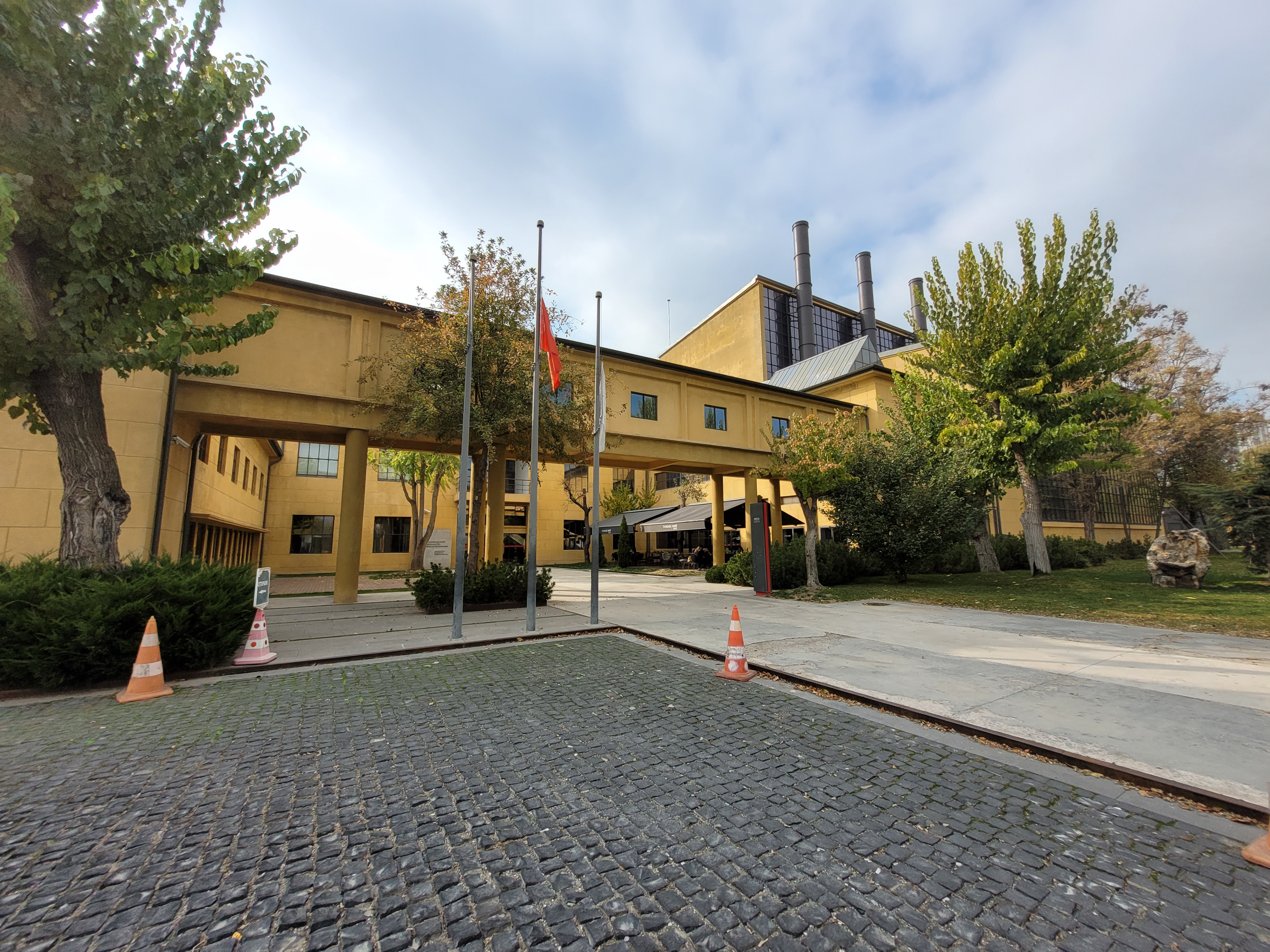
Abdullah Gül Presidential Museum and Library

== Academics ==
The Abdullah Gül University currently has 12 Bachelor's of Science, 6 Master's of Science & 5 Doctoral programs organized into 5 schools:

- School of Engineering: Computer Engineering, Civil Engineering (B.Sc), Electrical & Electronics Engineering (B.Sc), Industrial Engineering (B.Sc), Mechanical Engineering (B.Sc), Advanced Materials and Nanotechnology (M.Sc), Materials Science and Mechanical Engineering (PhD), Electrical and Computer Engineering (M.Sc and PhD), Industrial Engineering (M.Sc and PhD), Sustainable Urban Infrastructure Engineering (M.Sc)
- School of Architecture: Architecture (B.Sc, M.Sc & PhD)
- School of Leadership and Management: Business Administration (B.Sc), Economics (B.Sc)
- School of Life and Natural Sciences: Molecular Biology and Genetic (B.Sc), Bioengineering (B.Sc, M.Sc & PhD)
- School of Humanities and Social Sciences: Political Science and International Relations (B.Sc), Psychology (B.Sc)
- AGU School of Languages (AGUSL): Freshman AGU students whose English proficiency is not sufficient to enroll at the faculty level have the opportunity to complete AGUSL's one-year English preparatory program before joining their faculty courses. The AGUSL also offers all students the opportunity to gain some familiarity with a second foreign language that has world significance.

== Centers and institutes ==
AGU Youth Factory collaborates with national and international partners, including Sabancı University, Koç University, Ashoka Foundation, the Kayseri Chamber of Commerce, the Kayseri Chamber of Industry, the Goethe Institute, American Chamber of Commerce, the U.S. Embassy in Ankara, the Robert Bosch Foundation, APCO Worldwide, and Youth For Understanding. AGU Academy functions as a certified SAT test center and administers standardized examinations, including the TOEFL iBT and GRE.

The Research and Development Office, in collaboration with Kayseri Teknopark and the Technology Transfer Office, assists researchers with proposal preparation, identifying collaborators, and securing funding. It also offers training on topics such as research funding, intellectual property, and entrepreneurship.

== International perspective and collaborations ==
University rankings

Global – Overall
- THE World: 801-1000 (2026)

Regional – Overall
- QS Emerging Europe and Central Asia: 200 (2022)
- QS Europe: 466 (2025)

Abdullah Gül University is the first public university in Turkey to offer the Pearson Higher National Diploma. In the United States, AGU has agreements with institutions such as the University of California, Irvine, IIT College of Architecture, University of Central Florida, Central Washington University, Salem State University, and Missouri University of Science and Technology. In South Korea, AGU partners with the University of Ulsan, Catholic University of Korea, Incheon National University, SolBridge International School of Business, Woosong University, Seoul National University of Science and Technology, Dong-A University, and Sogang University. AGU also has several partnerships in Taiwan, including Shih Chien University, National Taiwan University of Science and Technology, National University of Kaohsiung, National Quemoy University, University of Taipei, and Providence University.

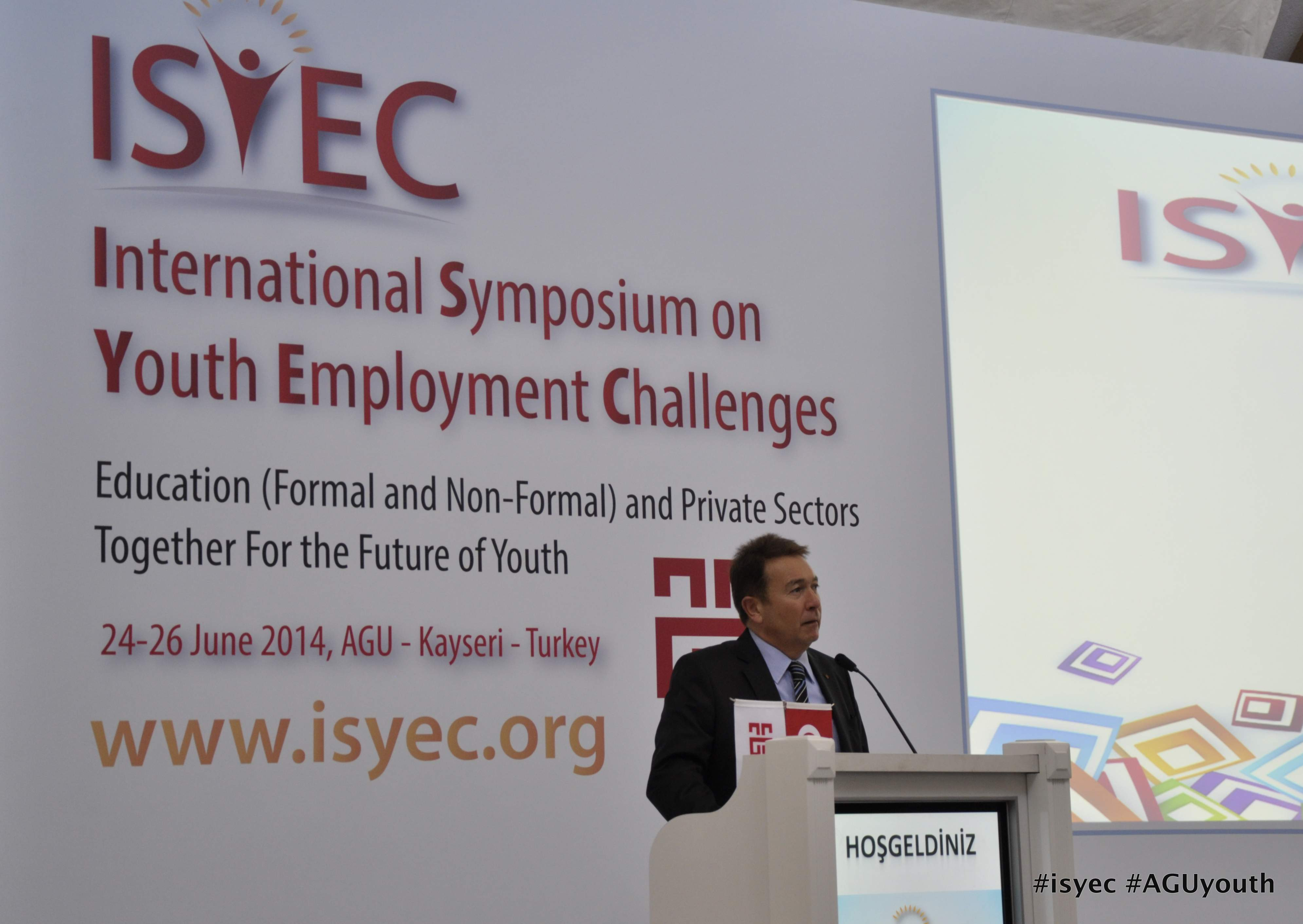
Rector Sabuncuoğlu's opening speech at the 2014 International Symposium on Youth Employment Challenges

In the Netherlands, AGU partners with Maastricht School of Management and Wittenborg University of Applied Sciences. In Ireland, AGU has a partnership with Dorset College. In France, AGU collaborates with ESC Rennes School of Business, University of Technology of Troyes, University of Nantes, Leonardo da Vinci University Center, and INSA Toulouse. AGU’s German partnerships include Hof University, SRH University Heidelberg, University of Erlangen-Nuremberg, FH Münster, Deggendorf Institute of Technology, and Clausthal University of Technology. In Greece, AGU partners with the University of West Attica, Hellenic Mediterranean University, University of the Aegean, National Technical University of Athens, and University of Ioannina. In Hungary, AGU collaborates with Budapest University of Technology and Economics and Budapest Metropolitan University. In Italy, AGU has partnerships with Politecnico di Milano, University of Bergamo, University of Naples Federico II, and University of Minho. Abdullah Gül University has agreements with universities in Spain, including the Polytechnic University of Catalonia, Camilo José Cela University, University of Murcia, University of Seville, and Polytechnic University of Cartagena. Other European collaborations include those with Universidade de Coimbra in Portugal.

Abdullah Gül University is a member of the Q^{n} University Alliance. This alliance includes University of Urbino, Valencian International University, Escola Superior de Enfermagem de Coimbra, University of Galați, Aalen University, EDC Paris Business School, and European University of Tirana.

Founding rector İhsan Sabuncuoğlu officially signed the Magna Charta Universitatum Charter on behalf of the university during the Ceremony in celebration of the 30th Anniversary of the Signature of the Magna Charta Universitatum, held in Salamanca, Spain.

In the 2025 Times Higher Education (THE) Impact Rankings, which evaluate universities worldwide against the United Nations' Sustainable Development Goals, Abdullah Gül University achieved a global ranking of 37th. This placement made it the highest-ranked institution in Türkiye out of the 121 represented Turkish universities, and one of only four universities in the country to place within the global top 100.
