= UVIS =

UVIS may stand for

- Unified Victim Identification System,
- Ultraviolet Imaging Spectrograph on Cassini spacecraft
- Under vehicle inspection system

== See also ==
- Uvis (given name), a Latvian masculine given name
