= Hamdi Akın =

Turkish businessman (Born 1954)

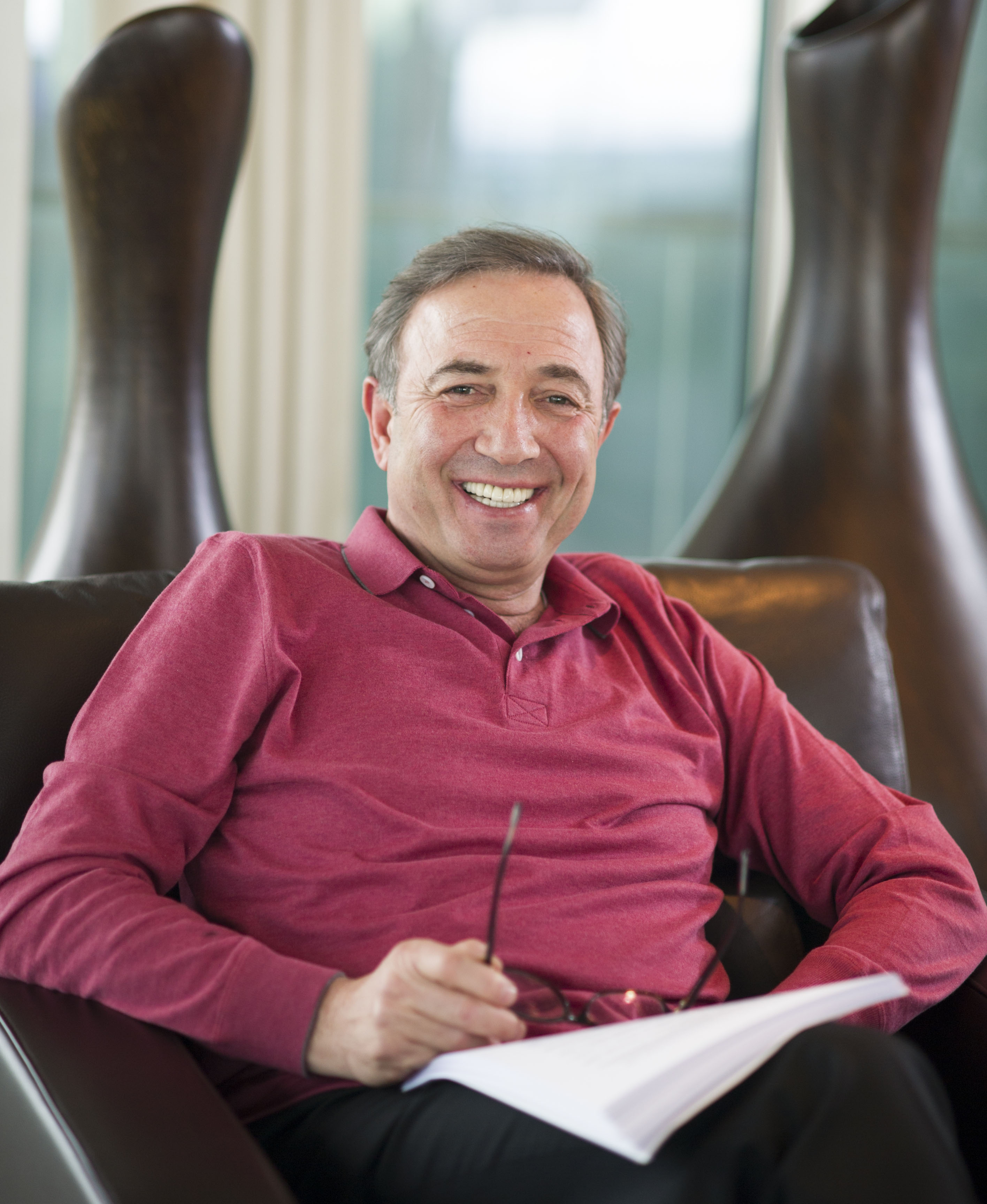
- Hamdi Akın, 2014
- Born: 17 August 1954; Istanbul
- Education: Gazi University (BS)
- Occupation: Chairman of Akfen Holding

Hamdi Akın (born 17 August 1954, in Istanbul) is a Turkish businessman and the chairman of the board of directors of Akfen Holding. In 2016, Forbes ranked him as the 1694th richest person in the world with a net worth of $1 billion, and the 27th richest in Turkey.

== Early life ==
Hamdi Akın is the third child of Hasan and Hikmet Akın. He studied high school in Mustafa Kemal Lisesi in Ankara, Yenimahalle, and then mechanical engineering in Gazi University.

== Professional life ==
Hamdi Akın got a start in business while he was in his third year of university and manufactured water storage, fuel storage and heating boiler in his father's workshop. Akın’s first commission was to manufacture the heating boiler of Ankara Emek Mosque. Later on, he opened up a shop for construction goods in Ankara, on Rüzgarlı Street. In 1976, he became a contractor in the construction business and founded Akfen Holding. In the 1980s, he mainly dealt with infrastructure projects, besides hospitals and school buildings construction. In 1986, he developed his first public infrastructure investment project, the Antalya Airport Terminal Building, which came to life with the ‘Build – Operate – Transfer’ model. He also contracted the Kayseri Erkilet Airport, the Çarşamba Airport, the Isparta Airport, the General Directorate of State Airports Authority and Bursa Natural Gas.

In 1997, he founded TAV Airports with TEPE Group and VIE Group and won the İstanbul Atatürk Airport tender, which was constructed with the ‘Build – Operate – Transfer’ model. He gathered all the companies that mainly serve to design and develop real estate investment projects of airport, construction, port investment and management, as well as energy and other infrastructure investments, under a single Holding roof. He is the chairman of board of directors in Akfen Holding,and served as the chairman of TAV Airports Holding from 2005 until 2017.

In 2005, Hamdi Akın went into a 50/50 partnership with one of the prominent port operators, PSA, and won the tender for privatization of Mersin Port’s 36 years of operational rights. In 2006, he founded Akfen Real Estate Investment Trust Inc. He made a deal with Accor S.A. to form a strategic partnership and build three and four starred city hotels. In 2007, he set Mersin International Port (MIP) into operation and became the chairman of the board of directors. Akfen won the operational rights to operate the vehicle inspection stations with TUV Sud AG and Dogus Automotive for 20 years, and sold its share to Bridge Point in 2009.

In 2005, he founded Akfen Su Inc. with the partnership of Kardan N.V. In 2011, he won the tender for the privatization of İDO (Istanbul Fast Ferries Co. Inc.) with Tepe Construction, Souter Investments LLP and Sera Real Estate and Operations Inc. In 2012, he sold 38% of his shares in TVA Airports to Aéroports de Paris for $847 million.

== Social Responsibilities ==
Hamdi Akın founded Turkey Human Resources Foundation (TİKAV) in 1999 for the students of Fırat University, to provide the social education necessary for their personal development during their 4 years of university education. He is the honorary head of the foundation. He is also one of the founders of the Contemporary Turkey Studies Chair at the London School of Economics.

In December 2015, following the Syrian civil war, Hamdi Akın opened his homes to Syrian refugees.

== Memberships ==
- Vice-President (2000–2002), Fenerbahçe Sports Club
- Ankara Region Representative (1992–2004), Council of the Turkish Metal Industrialists' Union (MESS)
- President (1998–2000), Turkish Young Businessmen’s Association (TÜGİAD)
- Board Member (1995–2001), Turkish Confederation of Employer Associations (TİSK)
- Member of the Board and President of Information Society and New Technologies Commission (2008–2009), TÜSİAD
- Board of Trustees & Vice-President, Abdullah Gül University Foundation
- Member of the Board, Deniz Temiz Foundation
- Member, İstanbul Rotary Club

== Private life ==
Hamdi Akın has two daughters and a son. Pelin Akın and Selim Akın are members of the board of Akfen Holding.
