= UVI =

UVI may refer to:

- United States Virgin Islands, UNDP country code
- University of the Virgin Islands, university in the United States Virgin Islands
- Under vehicle inspection, road imaging system for threat detection
- Ultraviolet index
- UVI, software instrument brand
