= Vehicle inspection =

Testing for compliance with regulations

An inspection sticker from the Commonwealth of Massachusetts

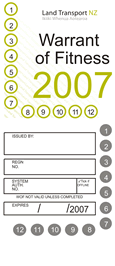
A Warrant of Fitness certificate issued to vehicles in New Zealand

Vehicle inspection is a procedure mandated by national or subnational governments in many countries, in which a vehicle is inspected to ensure that it conforms to regulations governing safety, emissions, or both. Inspection can be required at various times, e.g., periodically or on the transfer of title to a vehicle. If required periodically, it is often termed periodic motor vehicle inspection; typical intervals are every two years and every year. When a vehicle passes inspection, often a sticker (inspection decal or inspection sticker) is placed on the vehicle's windshield or registration plate to simplify later controls, but in some countries—such as the Netherlands since 1994—this is no longer necessary. Most US inspection decals/stickers display the month's number and the year.

In some jurisdictions, proof of inspection is required before a vehicle license or license plate can be issued or renewed. In others, once a vehicle passes inspection, an inspection decal is attached to the windshield or registration plate, and police can enforce the inspection law by seeing whether the vehicle displays an up-to-date decal.

There has been some controversy over whether periodically inspecting motor vehicles is a cost-effective way to improve road traffic safety. Recent analysis of changes in safety inspection procedures in the United States strongly suggests that vehicle safety inspection programs are no longer necessary and are simply a form of residual government oversight.

== Africa ==
=== Nigeria ===
In Lagos State, vehicle inspection at the Lagos Computerised Vehicle Inspection Service, LACVIS, is a statutory requirement demanded from all vehicle owners before the issuance of a Road Worthiness Certificate.

This inspection checks for emission, machine-based headlamp test, suspension, alignment, brakes efficiency and underneath inspection among other tests using computerised equipment. After the tests, the certification officer at the centre will give the vehicle owner a vehicle inspection report which states the defect(s), if any, found during the inspection. If the vehicle fails the inspection, the vehicle owner will be advised to fix the defects within a 30 days period.

Vehicles under the private vehicle category are mandated to undergo annual inspection before the issuance of a Road Worthiness Certificate by a Vehicle Inspection Officer (VIO) gets declined. However, vehicles under the commercial category are required to undergo periodic inspection twice a year. A vehicle that passed the inspection qualifies for a Road Worthiness Certificate and tag which will be placed on the windscreen. Enforcement is done by the Vehicle Inspection Officers.

Other states that have adopted the computerised vehicle inspection include Minna, Anambra with more states in view and the FCT, Abuja.

=== South Africa ===
A roadworthy vehicle is considered to be roadworthy until it changes hands. A vehicle purchaser is required to register the change-of-ownership of a vehicle. The new owner must present a Roadworthy Certificate (CoR) in order to receive a new license (disk) for the vehicle. A new license plate number is also issued at that time.

If a motor vehicle is used for public transport or is a heavy-load vehicle (excluding buses), it is tested for roadworthiness every year before the motor vehicle license is renewed. A bus must be tested for roadworthiness every six months.

== Americas ==
=== Brazil ===
There is a safety inspection program called Programa de Inspeção e Manutenção de Veículos em Uso (PMVE). An annual PMVE inspection is required for all vehicles older than three years. The inspection can be conducted at an authorized inspection center, and the vehicle owner is responsible for the cost. Brakes, tires, suspension, lights, exhaust emissions, and other components are inspected.

=== Canada ===
Emissions test abolished Periodic safety inspection Emissions test in some regions and safety inspection upon vehicle transfer Safety inspection upon transfer of the vehicle

Safety testing regulations in Canada vary through the different ten provinces and emission testing programs was required bi-annually in southern Ontario only (Ontario's Drive Clean). On September 28, 2018, the Ontario government under Doug Ford announced the cancellation of the Drive Clean program and instead focusing on heavy duty vehicles; the change became effective on April 1, 2019. AirCare in British Columbia has been abolished since 2015.

In Manitoba, Ontario and Newfoundland and Labrador, upon buying a car (new or used) only, a valid safety check must be done before it can be registered. Dealerships are required to provide the buyer with a new safety, while private sellers are not (if a private seller so chooses, they may pay for, and issue a new safety in order to make it more appealing to buy). In either case, if the vehicle bought has not had a safety test within the last year, the buyer must safety the vehicle before it can be registered with Manitoba Public Insurance, Service Ontario, or Service NL. From the point the car is registered, no safety test is required as long as the car remains with the current owner (however, if something goes wrong, auto mechanics, dealerships and the police have the right to refuse to let the client drive away with an unsafe car).

The province of Prince Edward Island require annual safety inspections, in Nova Scotia and New Brunswick, a safety inspection is required every two years for passenger vehicles and every year for heavy duty vehicles.

In the provinces of British Columbia, Alberta, Saskatchewan, Quebec and the territories (Yukon, Northwest Territories and Nunavut), usually no vehicle inspection or emissions test is required for passenger vehicles, unless the vehicle has been imported from another jurisdiction. Commercial vehicle requirements vary.

=== United States ===
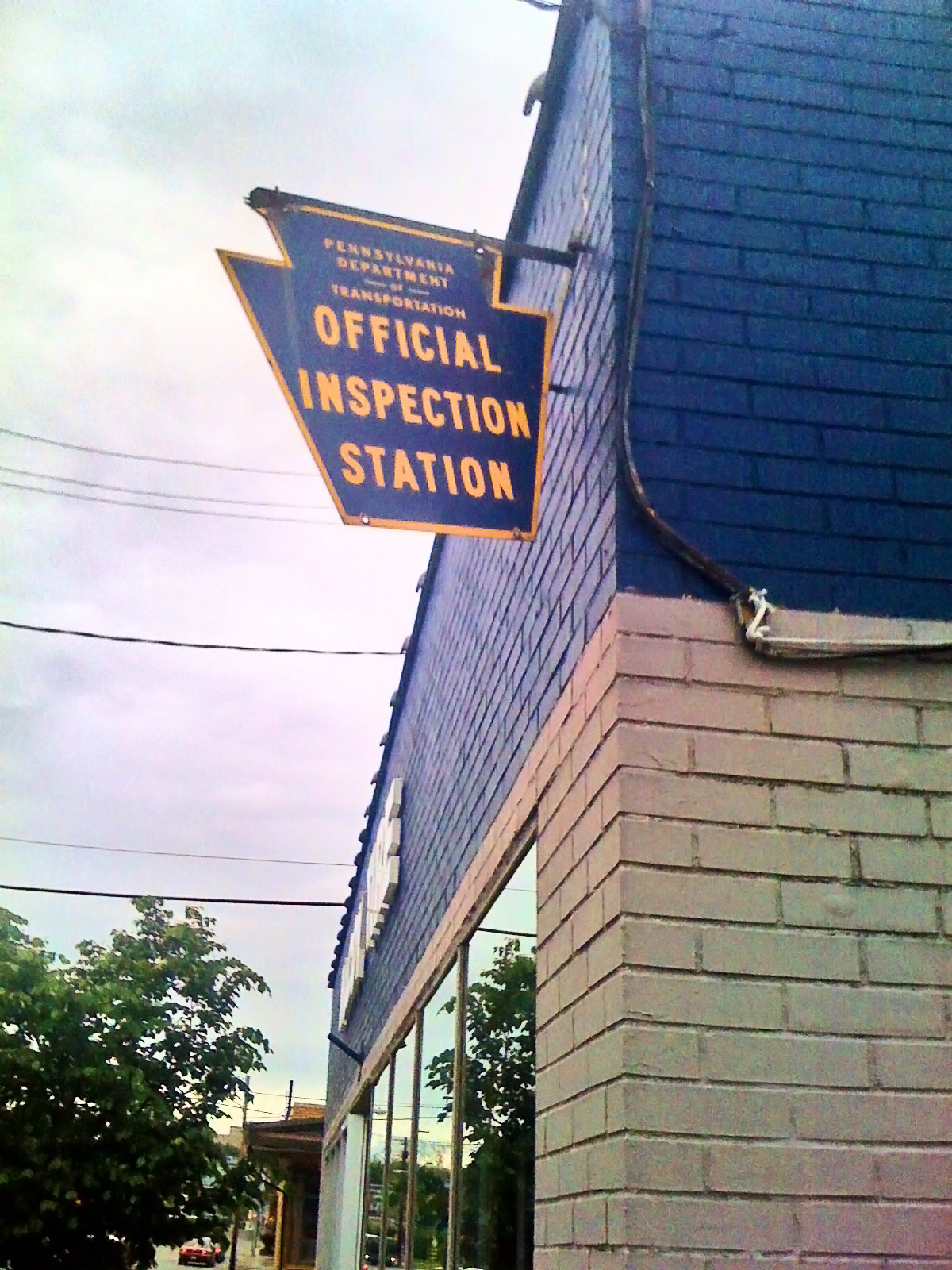
PennDOT-issued sign at an auto garage stating that it performs vehicle inspections for cars registered in Pennsylvania

In the United States, each state government is free to decide whether to require vehicle safety inspection, as well as the specifics of the inspection program. Eighteen states have a periodic (annual or biennial) safety inspection program, while Maryland requires an inspection prior to registration or transfer of ownership only. Several states have abolished their safety inspection programs in recent years, claiming that these programs do not reduce accidents and are merely a tax on vehicle owners.

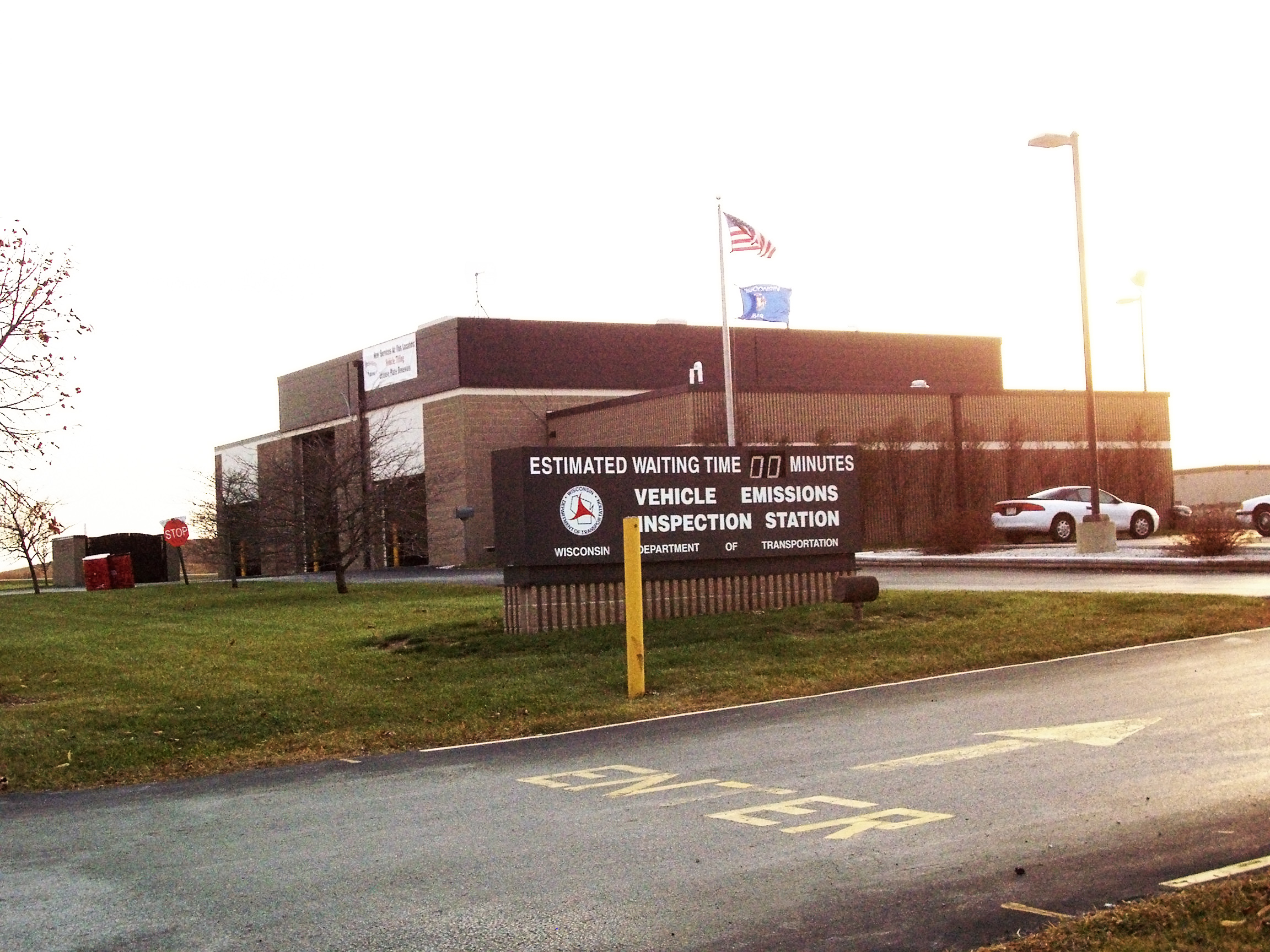
Wisconsin vehicle emissions inspection station

Under the Clean Air Act (1990), states are required to implement vehicle emission inspection programs in metropolitan areas whose air quality does not meet federal standards. The specifics of those programs vary from state to state. Some states, including Florida, Kentucky and Minnesota, have discontinued their testing programs in recent years with approval from the federal government.

In some states and the District of Columbia, inspections are done at state-operated inspection stations. In other states, privately owned garages perform the inspections with approval from the state. Where the inspection is done at a private facility, the vehicle owner may, but is not required to, have the facility performing the inspection provide any service or repairs needed if it would fail inspection. In some states, if a vehicle fails inspection, it is given a "rejection sticker" which is affixed to the vehicle in the same manner as the regular inspection sticker, allows the vehicle owner to continue to operate the vehicle for a short period of time so that they may obtain any service or repair needed to bring the vehicle into compliance.

== Asia ==
=== China ===
Private cars are required to have safety and emission inspections every other year between Year 6 and 10, every year between Year 10 and 15, and every six months after Year 15. Chinese Rural Vehicle (CRV) operators can be fined by the police if their vehicle emits visible smoke. Regulations are established and enforced by province/economic region/city as appropriate. New vehicles must pass regulations (Euro spec) in effect on the day of manufacture. This applies also in Hong Kong.

=== India ===
In India, under the Motor Vehicles Act of 1988, vehicle inspections ensure safety and environmental standards. Private petrol-powered cars need a fitness test after 15 years from their first registration and private diesel-powered cars need a fitness test after 10 years from their first registration and then every 5 years. Motorcycles follow the same 15-year rule. Commercial vehicles, like trucks and buses, must be inspected annually. Vehicles must meet at least Bharat Stage 4 (BS-IV) emission norms, with the latest BS-VI standards for reducing pollution. Inspections are conducted at government and private centers, and passing them is necessary to renew registration and get a fitness certificate. Non-compliance can lead to fines or vehicle impounding. Recent changes include digital systems for easier booking and tracking of inspections.

In India, vehicle fitness tests and the associated fee structure are regulated by the Ministry of Road Transport and Highways (MoRTH). In 2025, MoRTH revised the fitness test fees for 10-, 15-, and 20-year-old vehicles.

=== Iran ===
سیمفا

All the vehicles which are older than four years should get the certificate from authorized center every year. The centers perform safety and emission tests on the vehicles.

=== Israel ===
Cars older than three years are required to have a yearly inspection as part of the car's license. A car which fails the inspection, must be fixed in seven days to be allowed to be driven on the road. The "Test" checks the following: vehicle and owner identification including vehicle registration plate; emissions; steering; underside; lights; brakes; wheel alignment. Cars older than fifteen years are considered "antique", and must be inspected every six months, and have additional inspection of the brakes done.

=== Japan ===
Under the Japanese shaken (車検) program, personal cars and two wheeled motorcycles require a shaken (automobile inspection) after three years, and every two years thereafter.

=== Pakistan ===
In Pakistan, vehicle inspection is conducted at different stages to ensure road safety and compliance. At the time of registration, authorities verify the chassis number, engine number, and legal status of the vehicle. Commercial vehicles must obtain a fitness certificate, which is renewed annually to confirm their roadworthiness. Additionally, traffic and motorway police conduct random on-road inspections, while some provinces have Vehicle Inspection & Certification Systems (VICS) for emissions and safety checks.

=== Singapore ===
Cars are required to obtain a safety and emissions inspection every other year starting in the third model year, and annually after ten model years. Motorcycles and mopeds must be inspected annually starting in the third model year. Buses, taxicabs, commercial vehicles, and trailers must be inspected every year or six months depending on the vehicle's age. An up to date inspection (if required) is needed to renew a vehicle's road tax.

=== South Korea ===
Per the Motor Vehicle Management Act, all vehicles are required to have regular inspections. Safety, noise, and emissions are inspected. These inspections are overseen by the Korea Transportation Safety Authority. Cars are checked against safety, emissions, and noise standards. Vehicle identification, braking system, steering, speedometer, horn, visibility, lighting equipment, parts of the electrical system, axles, wheels, tires, suspension, chassis, emission systems, parts of the fuel system, frame, body, glass, and other components are inspected.

=== Taiwan ===
Cars older than five years are required to have yearly safety and emission inspection. Cars older than ten years are required to have the inspection every six months. Motorcycles and scooters older than five years are required to have yearly emission inspection. Failure to comply may result in fine, license suspension and revocation.

The inspection standards often vary between various local Motor Vehicle Offices. Where one office adheres strictly to a, often outdated standards booklet, another office may simply allow each inspector to gauge according to their own experiences. It is widely accepted that in cases where a vehicle fails an inspection due to suspicion of vehicle having modifications, validity of the said suspicion being irrelevant, vehicle owners often hire a scalper (found often outside each Motor Vehicle Offices) to go through the inspection process in their stead. It is an unspoken common practice for sometimes even a factory condition vehicle to be challenged by inspectors, as it creates business for scalpers and private inspection offices.

=== United Arab Emirates ===
All vehicles are required for technical inspection to renew the vehicle license. For passenger cars over 3 years old, technical inspections are required every 12 months. Inspection is required when transferring ownership or exporting the vehicle outside the country.

== Europe ==
=== European Union ===
The EU Directive 2014/45 of April 3, 2014 mandates all member states to carry out periodic safety and emission (roadworthiness) inspections for most types of motor vehicles including passenger cars, light and heavy goods vehicles, trailers, tractors with designed speed exceeding 40 km/h and, from 1 January 2022, motorcycles with engine displacement over 125 cm^{3}. It also sets minimum requirements for those inspections and their intervals. For vehicles up to 3.5 tonnes and tractors the first inspection shall occur no later than 4 years after first registration and at a frequency of up to 2 years thereafter. Vehicles over 3.5 tonnes are mandated to undergo inspections no later than 1 year after first registration and every year thereafter.

==== Austria ====
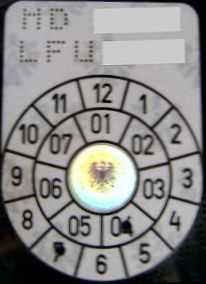
Austrian decal, inspection due July 2004

In Austria, all vehicles must undergo a "Wiederkehrende Begutachtung nach § 57a KFG" (recurring inspection under section 57a of the motor vehicle statute). A decal is placed on the vehicle's windscreen (usually the upper left-hand corner as seen from outside the vehicle), hence the inspection itself is colloquially referred to as "Pickerl" (literally: "little sticker"). The color of the decal is white for vehicles with a catalytic converter, green for vehicles without one and red for historic registered cars. Punch holes indicate the month and year that the next inspection is due; the month is based on the first registration of the car. The actual inspection can be carried out one month in advance of or up to four months after the date indicated on the decal; the vehicle remains road-legal during that time. Unless the inspection is overdue, as just described, the roadworthiness certificate is transferable, so that a potential new owner will get a new decal with the same date, but the corrected license plate number upon registration of the vehicle. However, the latest official inspection report has to be presented for this purpose to the authority issuing the new registration documents and license plates.

The first inspection of a passenger car is required after three years; another one two years later; and thereafter passenger cars must pass the official inspection annually to remain road-legal. Historic registered cars have an inspection period of two years. Heavy trucks and motorcycles must undergo annual inspections from the very first year. Inspections are carried out by licensed garages and by Austria's two major automobile clubs. The Austrian motor vehicle inspection covers both vehicle safety standards and emissions standards.

==== Belgium ====
In Belgium, a vehicle inspection is known as an autokeuring (Dutch) or contrôle technique (French). All cars over four years old must be tested annually, and before selling them on the second-hand market. This annual period may be extended to two years if the following apply: the vehicle passes the inspection with a green certificate (see below); the vehicle has covered less than 100,000 km; the vehicle has been tested within its date limit and is less than six years old.

Commercial vehicles must undergo an annual test, immediately after the first registration. Cars that pass the inspection receive a green certificate, which must be carried in the vehicle at all times along with other required documentation. An inspection has three possible outcomes:

- If the car is approved, the owner gets a green card, possibly noting some small attention points.
- If the vehicle failed the inspection, a red card is given, which allows the owner to repair the car during the next two weeks, but does not prohibit use of the car in the meantime.
- In the worst case, the car is not allowed on the road anymore, and has to be repaired immediately.

Receiving a red card is not uncommon for older cars, so people often have to go two or more times to pass.

Vehicle inspection centers are private companies, and can be found throughout Belgium. A vehicle owner may choose their preferred inspection center; however, if the vehicle fails inspection at one center, it must return to that same center for a retest within the two-week deadline. If it goes to any other center, the entire inspection will be repeated instead of only the failure conditions.

Vehicles undergo a series of tests, including exhaust emissions, lights, suspension, brakes, tires, and checks for impairing vehicle body damage and rust, and a strict control of the required vehicle documents. The set of tests performed depends on the vehicle's class (such as passenger car, truck or classic car).

==== Bulgaria ====
All cars must undergo an annual test. This test is conducted at accredited garages. This test is rather basic with only the brakes, lights and emissions being tested. Initial test is conducted in case of first registration and every change of registration in the traffic police stations (KAT). Cars newer than six years pass the test once every two years. Taxis and buses must be checked at every six months.

==== Croatia ====
The National programme of road transport safety of the Republic of Croatia 2011-2020 (Croatian: Nacionalni program sigurnosti cestovnog prometa Republike Hrvatske 2011.-2020. godine) treats vehicle inspections as an important area of prevention of traffic accidents, and as a vessel for regular financing of road safety regulations. The annual vehicle inspections in Croatia (tehnički pregled) typically find unacceptable technical faults in about one fifth of all vehicles (as of 2013). Based on the Law of Road Transport Safety, vehicles are inspected in specialized shops (stanica za tehnički pregled, lit. technical inspection station) as a precondition of registration, which is then finalized by the Ministry of Internal Affairs. The technical inspection stations also serve to control that vehicle insurance was obtained, that the road tax is paid, that the various taxes and levies on cars are duly paid, etc. They also collect various national statistics as well as enforce the payment of valid traffic violation fines.

==== Czech Republic ====
Czech Republic requires emission inspection Měření emisí and safety inspection Technická kontrola every two years for passenger cars. New passenger cars have to obtain their first roadworthiness certificate after four years. Until the end of 2014, an emission inspection decal (green) and a safety inspection decal (red) was placed on the rear license plate, after a vehicle has passed both emission and technical inspections. The expiration month and year was punched in each decal. Since 2015 only the safety inspection decal (red) is placed on the rear license plate, as passing the emission inspection was a prerequisite for admission to the safety inspection.

==== Estonia ====
Vehicle inspection (tehnoülevaatus) for cars with register mass less than 3500 kg is required in three years for a new car, every two years for cars less than ten years old, and every year for cars over ten years old. The inspection can be done at accredited vehicle inspectors.

==== Finland ====
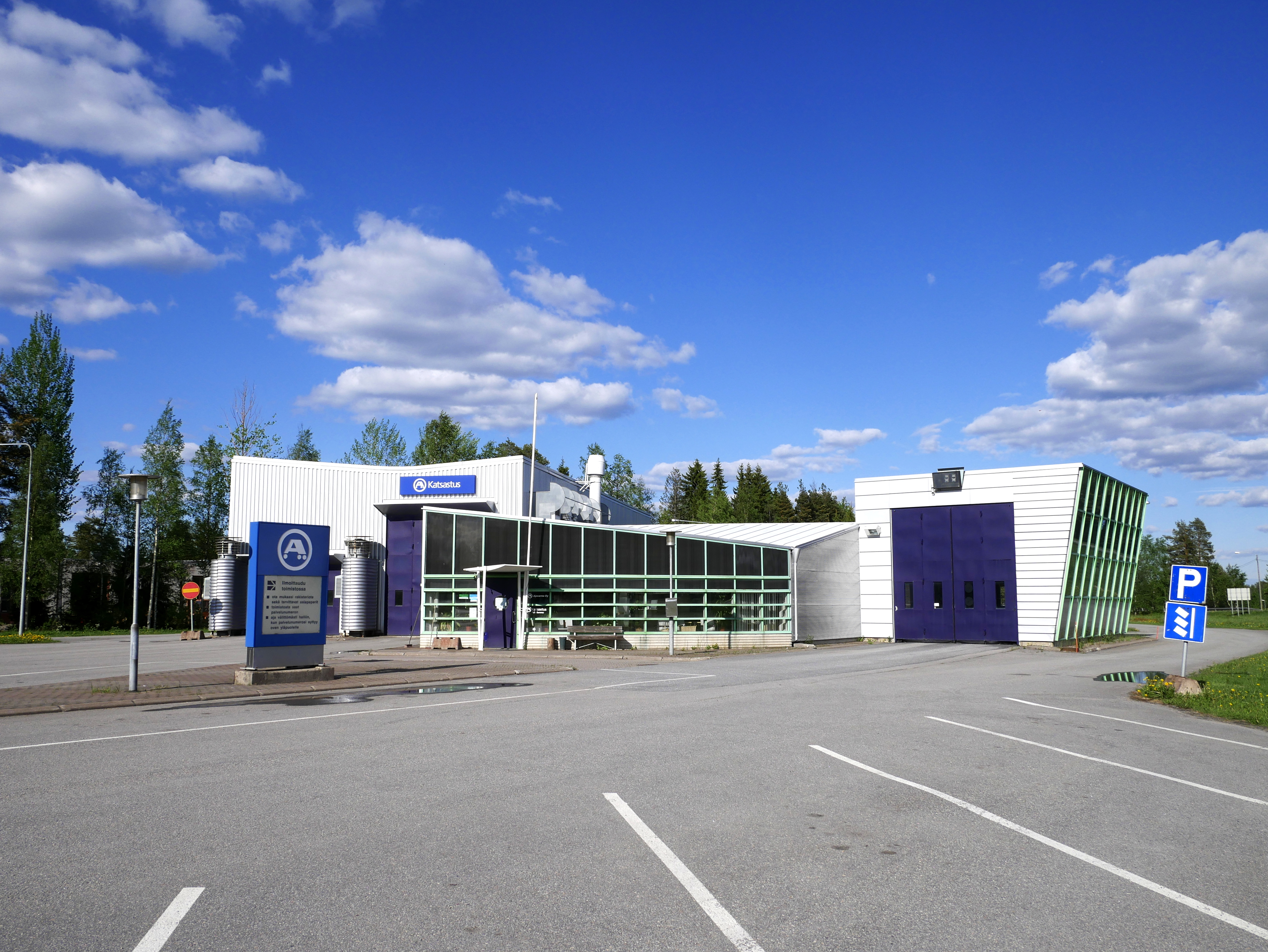
A-Katsastus (Inspection station) in Alavus, Finland

Finland has a long tradition of vehicle inspection, dating back to year 1917. Vehicle inspection was initially carried by cities and provincial inspectors but starting from year 1968 the inspection moved to national governing body of road vehicle administration known as Autorekisterikeskus. In 1994 the vehicle inspection was opened for competition and in 1996 Autorekisterikeskus was split as administrative body Ajoneuvohallintokeskus (AKE) and inspection company Suomen Autokatsastus Oy. Until 2019 it was Liikenteen Turvallisuusvirasto Trafi and nowadays joined Finnish Transport and Communications Agency Traficom, the successor of Ajoneuvohallintokeskus since beginning of the 2010, governs the inspection companies and keeps track of inspection quality and the inspections are carried by private companies. During the years, the inspection procedures and facilities have improved greatly and nowadays the quality of inspection is on such level that mechanical failures as immediate cause for fatal crashes in whole country are minimal.

In Finland, the "Määräaikaiskatsastus" (periodic inspection) is required for all passenger cars, vans, trucks, ATVs and for trailers with maximum structural weight of more than 750 kilograms. Inspection interval depends on vehicle class and usage. For privately used passenger car or van, inspection must be carried after four years, then every other year counting from the specified date of first deployment and every year after tenth year. If there is no specified date of first deployment (for instance 00.00.1987) the time of inspection is determined by the last number of license plate. The inspection period also varies depending on vehicle class and usage but for privately used passenger cars and vans the length of the period is four months preceding the date specified in date of first deployment or four months preceding the last date of inspection specified by the license plate number.

The periodic inspection includes verification of vehicle register information (VIN, taxes, insurance), a test drive, brake testing, inspection of lights and compulsory equipment, superficial inspection for visibility and handling hindrances and bodywork, undercarriage inspection for suspension parts and corrosion and emission measurements (requirements vary depending on propellant and date of first deployment). The emission measurement can be taken on a registered repair shop prior to the inspection. If done so, a proper measurement certificate must be shown at inspection. Upon passed inspection, a new "Part one" of registration certificate is printed and handed to customer among with inspection report. If inspection fails, the faults found during the inspection must be repaired. Vehicle needs to be shown at inspection station for "Jälkitarkastus" (recheck) within one month of the inspection. Customer may use different inspection station for this.

==== France ====
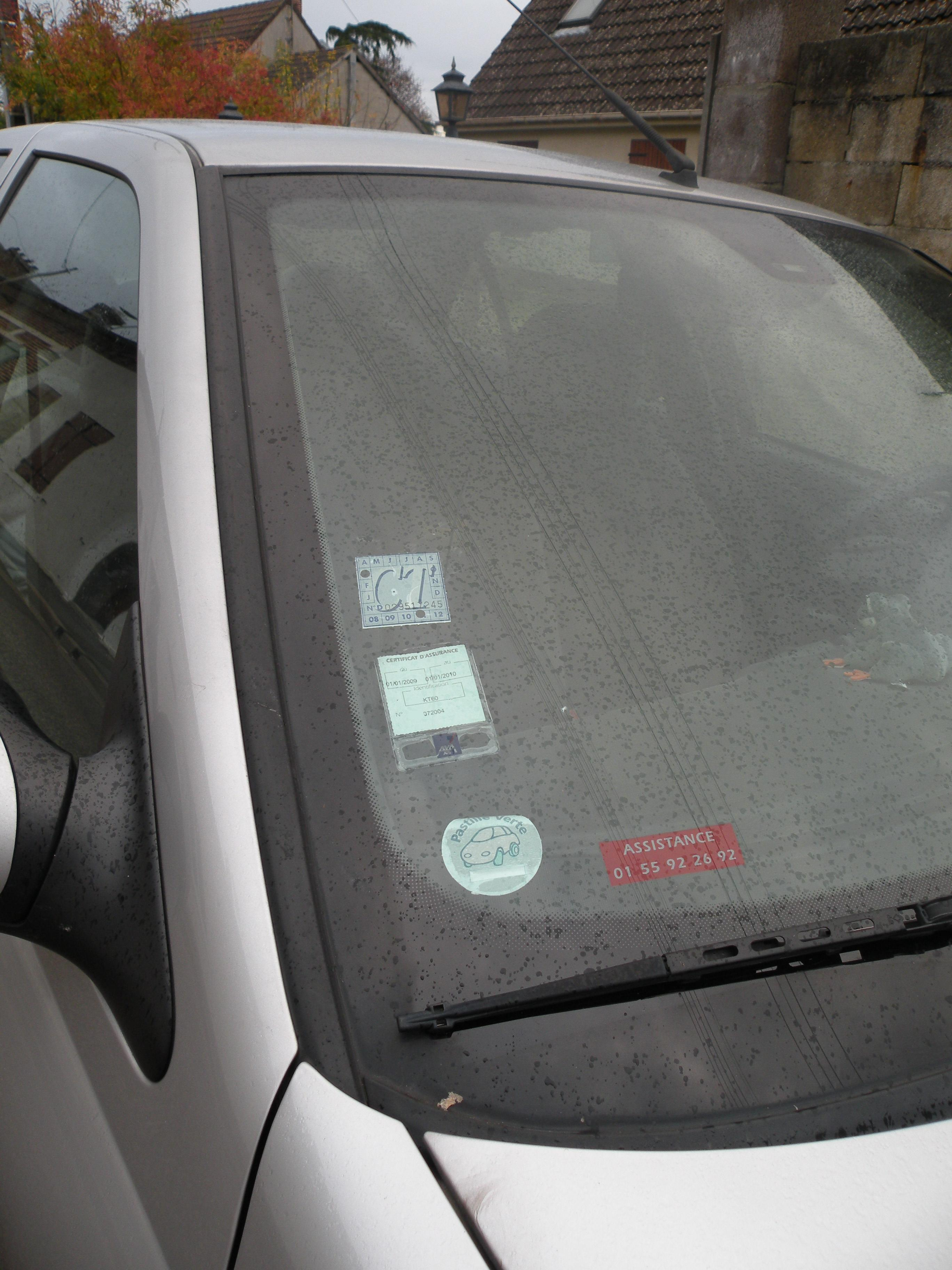
CT mark on a French car

Vehicle testing has been mandatory in France since 1992. The first inspection (Contrôle Technique) is carried out after four years then subsequently every two years. A blue and white CT sticker affixed inside the windscreen indicates when the next test is due. A less than 6 month valid CT is required prior to transfer of ownership.

Inspections are performed by privately owned stations certified by the government.

Since May 2018 the number of checkpoints has been increased to 133 points and a vehicle with a critical failure has to be sent to a garage within 24 hours.

Vintage cars are also controlled but their checks are adapted to their abilities at time of production. For instance, their pollution level is not controlled.

The starting date of the technical inspection of motorcycles is set for April 1, 2024.

==== Germany ====
German number plate sticker, indicating expiration in September 2024, when attached as shown

Passenger cars must pass a safety and emission inspection after three years for new cars, and then every two years. Heavy duty vehicles need to be inspected every year, motorcycles every two years. The inspection can be performed by various organizations, such as TÜV, DEKRA, KÜS, GTÜ. After a vehicle has passed the inspection, a safety inspection decal showing the month of expiry is placed on the rear license plate (the emission inspection decal was placed on the front license plate until it was phased out in 2010 and integrated into the safety inspection). The colour of the decal changes every year in a six-year cycle (orange, blue, yellow, brown, pink, green). The decal is placed with the number of the expiration month pointing to the top and there is a black marker around the 12. This means that the expiry month can also be recognized from a distance: the colour of the decal indicates the year and the black marker the expiry month, like the hour hand of a clock.

==== Greece ====
In Greece every passenger vehicle is required to undergo an inspection after four years from purchase (if new) and then every two years. Taxis, learner vehicles and heavy transport vehicles must undergo an inspection every year. Inspection centers can be either public or private companies. Private vehicle technical control centres (P-VTCC or Ι-ΚΤΕΟ in Greek) had to be accredited according to ISO 17020 standard. This requirement changed and P-VTCCs must be certified according to ISO 9001:2008 standard. After a vehicle has passed the inspection, a safety inspection decal showing the month of expiry is placed on the rear license plate.

==== Hungary ====
In Hungary every vehicle is required to be tested (technical test, Műszaki vizsga) for road worthiness and emission. In case of passenger cars the first inspection is after four years for new vehicles, and every two years afterwards. Inspection decals are placed on the rear license plate, and it is also documented in the vehicle's registration document. Recently checks are recorded electronically and stickers are no longer used.

==== Ireland ====
In Ireland, the National Car Test (NCT) is required for cars four or more years of age to be inspected for various items, such as brakes, lighting, bodywork condition, emissions, etc. A square certificate which must be displayed on the windscreen is issued to cars that pass the test. The certificate is valid for two years and then every one year after the car has reached 10 years in age, after which the car must then be retested.
A Certificate of Roadworthiness is required for goods vehicles, or vehicles carrying more than eight passengers (buses). This is commonly referred to as a "DOE" cert (after the Department of the Environment, which at the time administered the tests) and the test is carried out in approved garages.

==== Italy ====
Since 1997, any vehicle with a gross weight of under 3.5 tonnes, including motorcycles and mopeds, must have their first inspection, called revisione, after four years from the date of first registration, and then every two years. Exceptions are made for special vehicles like buses, lorries, taxicabs and ambulances, which are inspected every year.

The inspection can be done by any Italian DMV office (Ufficio della Motorizzazione Civile - UMC) or by one of the nearly 8500 privately owned authorized centers located around the country.

The inspection focuses on safety, and it is performed similarly to other EU countries, checking tires, brakes, lights, horn, undercarriage, rust, suspension parts, noise and exhaust pollution for either gas/LPG/CNG and Diesel engines. After a successful test, the center will print out a sticker saying "esito regolare", which has to be stuck behind the vehicle title (carta di circolazione), bearing the date of the inspection, the DMV/center's own identity code, the expiry month/year and an antifraud unique code.

If a vehicle fails the inspection, there are two options:

1. if the inspection outcome is "ripetere" ("repeat inspection"), because of minor and non-threatening failures, the vehicle has to be re-inspected within one month, with proof of the whole repair process such as an invoice
2. if the inspection outcome is "sospeso" ("banned from public roads"), because of major and dangerous failures, such as high exhaust pollution, corrosive rust going through any structural part of the body and/or chassis etc., the vehicle is only allowed to be brought in the nearest workshop, the same day of the failed inspection, and can be re-inspected with proof of the whole repair process such as an invoice.

The inspection fee is €45 or €66.88, depending on whether the vehicle is inspected at the DMV (€45) or at authorized centers (€80). The fee is doubled in case of re-inspecting the vehicle after a failed test.

==== Luxembourg ====
Since 1955, Luxembourg has had a mandatory annual test known as the "Contrôle Technique." It can be taken at one of 5 test centres or by approved partner garages.

==== Netherlands ====
In the Netherlands the "Algemene Periodieke Keuring" (APK) or General Periodical Inspection, introduced in 1985, is mandatory for vehicles aged between 3 and 50 years. New petrol cars are inspected after 4 years, then 6 and 8 years, and after that annually (up to year 30). Diesel cars are inspected after 3 years and after that annually. The inspection of vehicles from 30 to 49 years old is biennial for all cars, vehicles older than 50 years are exempt. The inspection includes conforming to safety and emission standards in force in the year of first introduction of the car. Registration is all digital and publicly accessible on the Rijksdienst Wegverkeer (RDW) website;

There are no longer visible stickers or decals on the vehicle, and since July 2008 the paper inspection report no longer needs to be carried in the car. The vehicle owner will receive notification for renewal before expiration. Owners of a vehicle without valid inspection will be fined automatically unless the vehicle's registration is suspended.

Inspections are done in licensed workshops that also do repairs if vehicles do not pass the APK. This may lead to a conflict of interest. Inspection stations are subject to random checks by the RDW.

==== Poland ====
In Poland there's an annual inspection requirement for most vehicles. New passenger car vehicles (of age four or less) have to be inspected according to the following intervals 3-2-1 years. Inspections are performed by accredited garages. The inspection includes checking of main car systems like brakes, suspension, lights and steering, as well as emission and presence of mandatory equipment. An additional, separate inspection is required for cars that are running on autogas. Pass of inspection is confirmed in registration certificates. When a car does not pass the inspection, the owner is requested to fix the cause and then pass subsequent inspection. A registration certificate may be also revoked in case the vehicle is in fatal technical condition.

Driving a car without valid inspection is subject to a fine.

==== Romania ====
Romanian vehicles must pass a periodic inspection between six months and two years depending on the age of the car, which is called "Inspecție Tehnică Periodică" (ITP)

==== Spain ====
ITV logo

Spanish vehicles are required to undergo an Inspección Técnica de Vehículos, better known as the ITV. Private civilian vehicles must be inspected after four years from the date of their first registration and afterwards must be inspected every two years until ten years; afterwards, they must be inspected annually. An inspection sticker with year and month indication is placed on the upper right inside of the vehicle's windshield, and yearly change the colour in order to make control easier. Inspections are done in official independent ITV stations.

==== Slovakia ====
Slovakia requires safety inspection technická kontrola and emission inspection emisná kontrola every two years for passenger cars. New passenger cars have to obtain their first roadworthiness certificate after four years. Heavy duty vehicles need to be presented to the safety inspection every year. The safety inspection and emission inspection decals are placed on the front glass (right down).

==== Sweden ====
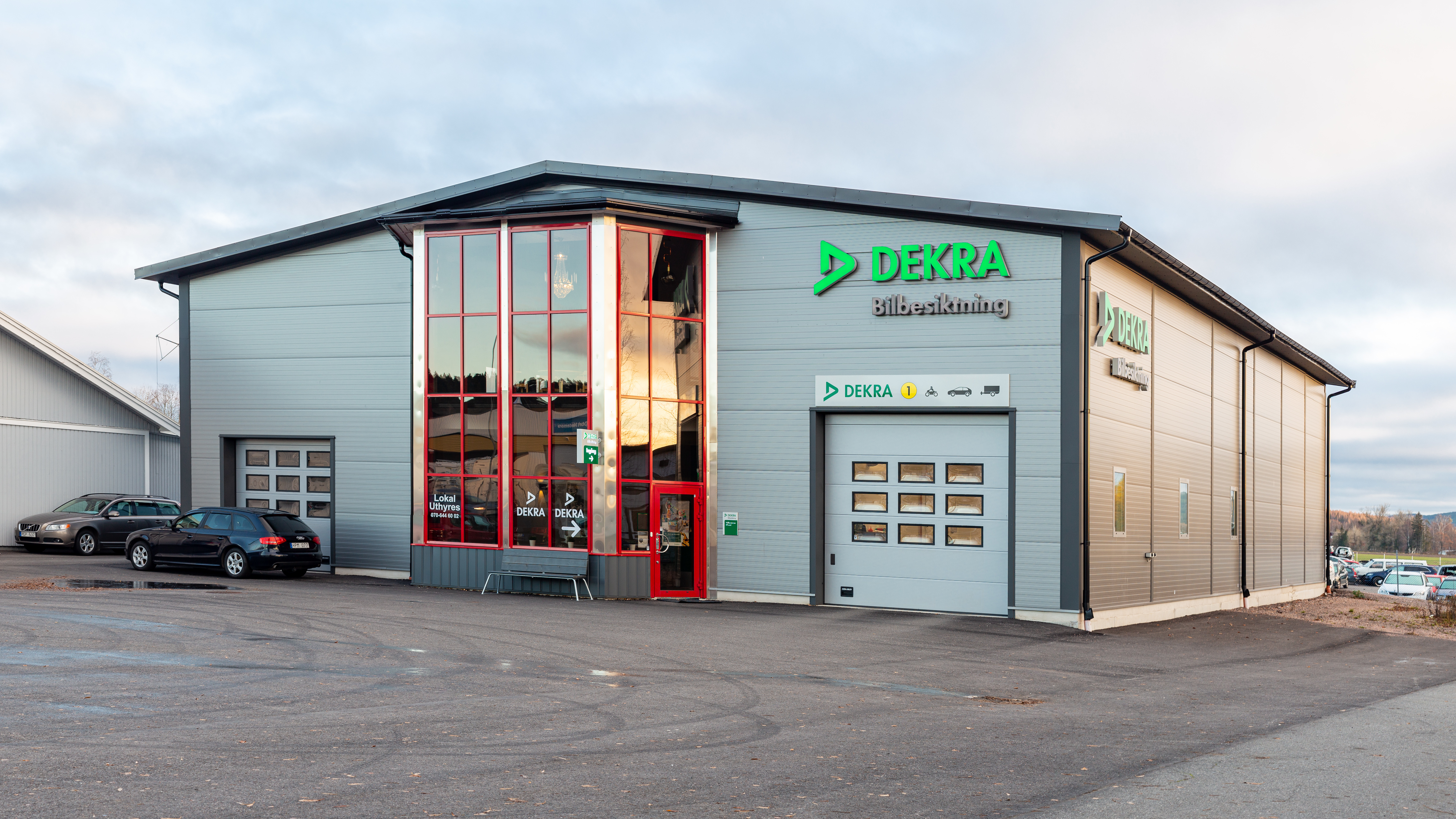
DEKRA in Hedemora, Dalarna county

In Sweden Svensk Bilprovning AB had a monopoly on vehicle inspections until June 30, 2010. In 2021 the five largest companies, accounting for more than 99% of the market shares, were Svensk Bilprovning, Besikta, Opus, Carspect and DEKRA. For cars classified as veteran/classic cars (currently occurring when the car reaches age 30), inspection is every 2 years. For modern cars the first inspection is after the vehicle becomes 3 years old, which after it has to be inspected after 2 years. From that moment an inspection has to be done every 14 months.

=== Norway ===
In Norway, the vehicle inspection is called "Periodisk Kjøretøykontroll", which translates to "Periodic vehicle inspection", although it is commonly referred to as "EU kontroll", for its origin from the European Union. When a car is four years old it must undergo its first inspection. After this, inspections will be required every second year. Buses, taxicabs and ambulances are inspected every year. The inspection focuses on safety and emission. After the inspection is completed, the owner will be given a check list with errors that must be repaired before the vehicle can pass. If the car only have errors marked with 1, or none errors at all, the car will pass immediately. The errors are rated depending on how dangerous they are, with the grades of 1, 2 and 3. Errors marked with 1 will not require a re-inspection. Errors marked with 2 will require a re-inspection, but the owner can use the car until the inspection deadline. Errors marked with 3 are very rare, and prohibits the user from using the car until those errors are repaired.

The inspection cost is usually between 75 and 130 US dollars (400-1000 Norwegian Kroner). Vehicles may be inspected at garages approved by the Norwegian Public Roads Administration (NPRA). Without a passed inspection, the license plates will be withdrawn, and the car will no longer be street legal. The police and the NPRA are checking license plates at a regular interval to check if the car has passed the inspection, if the road tax is paid and the car is insured.

=== Russia ===
In Russia all vehicles must pass a periodic inspection ensuring their road worthiness that includes adherence to the respective regulations. To pass the inspection the vehicle must not exceed the mandated emission level (currently Euro-3), the brakes must have no leaks and the brake forces must be symmetrical, steering slip must not exceed the mandated parameters (from 10° for cars to 25° for heavy trucks), all lights must provide the required color, aim and brightness of the emitted light, and the vehicle must be equipped with a first aid kit, fire extinguisher and emergency stop sign. The windshield must have a functional washer, and while window tinting is allowed, including the blinds on the windshield and rear window, they must pass the required amount of light.

To pass the inspection a driver must get to a police vehicle registration center or an authorized service station and present a vehicle for inspection. If the vehicle passes, then the driver receives a certificate of worthiness that must be presented to an insurance company to obtain the compulsory vehicle insurance. The lack of a valid insurance certificate or driving with an elapsed one is subject to heavy fines and eventual revocation of the driver's license. The test periodicity varies with the type of vehicle. Commercial buses (defined as vehicles that carry >8 persons aside from a driver) and oversize/dangerous cargo trucks must be inspected each six months, heavy trucks (>3.5 tons loaded weight) are inspected annually, while the new cars, motorcycles and light trucks (< 3.5 tons) must be first inspected after three years, then bi-annually until they are seven years old, after which the inspections become annual.

=== Turkey ===
Until 2008 the vehicle inspection was limited to administrative checks (whether all taxes have been paid) and a visual check if the car matches the documents. In August 2005 the Turkish government decided to introduce a vehicle inspection scheme following the directive 96/96/EC of the European Union. Since there was no technical equipment available for real roadworthiness tests a contract was laid out with the German TÜV SÜD that was presenting itself for the task in syndication with two Turkish corporations. The TÜV Türk trust is given a monopoly on car inspection for 20 years. Beginning with 2009 the TÜV test is mandatory for all cars with the inspection scheme to follow the German inspection scheme - however there is a transition period up to 2013 where established TÜV regulations are not followed as strictly as in mainland Europe. The shift in vehicle inspection policies is nevertheless rather sharp - since the old vehicle inspection service was strickened with corruption no staff members were taken over to the TÜV Süd, the internal inspection protocol is stricter than in Germany as to prevent any corruption. The introduction of the TÜV was accompanied with a strong propaganda program to agitate the requirement for a modern inspection scheme (e.g. the number of fatal road accidents was three times as high as in mainland Europe despite most of the country to be very rural). Additionally, it is expected that the connection with the German Turks allows for most citizens to have some knowledge how to cope with the TÜV inspection scheme.

=== United Kingdom ===
MOT logo

The MOT test (from Ministry of Transport, the former name of the Department for Transport) is a mandatory annual test of safety, road worthiness and exhaust emissions for vehicles over three years old. It is enforced by linking the official MOT database to the payment of Vehicle Excise Duty tax. Prior to November 2014 a tax disc had to be displayed on the vehicle.

After the first MOT (when the vehicle is three years old) the owner has to get the vehicle tested every 12 months (unlike in most of the European Union, where a test is required every 24 months after the vehicle is four years old). A test can be made up to 28 days before the expiry of the previous test without affecting the annual test date, allowing the next test to be up to 13 months later.

==== Isle of Man ====
In the Isle of Man there are no routine inspections for motorcycles or private cars. Rental cars over three years old, goods vehicles, buses and taxis require an annual inspection.

Inspections are also required if a vehicle over three years old is imported; this was introduced to prevent vehicles that had failed inspection regimes elsewhere being moved to the island. Inspections are also required if a vehicle has been off the road (not registered and insured) for more than two years.

== Oceania ==
=== Australia ===
Vehicle inspection in Australia is done on a state basis. Each state or territory has the authority to set its own laws pertaining to vehicle inspections, all (with the exception of the self-governing territory of Norfolk Island) have some form of inspection, either periodically or before a transfer of ownership.

In the state of Queensland, there is no legal requirement for periodic vehicle inspections. The only time a vehicle inspection is mandatory is when a vehicle is being sold: it must display a current Roadworthy Certificate (RWC) as an assurance to buyers that a vehicle meets minimum safety standards. Without a RWC, the vehicle can only be sold on an "as-is" basis, which does not entitle the vehicle to be lawfully driven on public roads or registered until a RWC is obtained. Heavy vehicles (e.g. trucks) and public passenger vehicles (e.g. limousines, taxis, public buses) have dedicated inspection schemes that must be complied with periodically, usually every 6–12 months.

In the state of Victoria, there is no legal requirement for a private vehicle to have periodic vehicle inspections]. The only times a vehicle inspection is required are when a vehicle:

- is being transferred to a new owner,
- is being registered after a period of being unregistered,
- is being registered for the first time (excluding brand new production vehicles), e.g. used imported cars, individually constructed vehicles, etc., or
- has been labeled an unroadworthy vehicle by a member of the police or VicRoads; in which case the owner will have 30 days to have the vehicle tested.

In Victoria, a vehicle that passes the inspection is deemed to be in "Roadworthy Condition" and is issued with a Roadworthy Certificate (RWC), which is valid for 30 days. An RWC checks general safety items of the car such as tyres, brakes, lights etc.; however, an emissions test is not required.

=== New Zealand ===
The NZ Transport Agency requires most vehicles to maintain a Warrant of Fitness (WoF) through periodic inspection. Brand new light vehicles initially receive a WoF valid for four years, four to fourteen year old vehicles will receive a two year WoF, and all over fourteen year old vehicles will receive a one year WoF. Motorcycles over four years old require yearly inspections.

Heavy vehicles and vehicles operated under a Transport Service Licence, such as taxis, shuttles, and rental cars, must obtain a Certificate of Fitness (CoF), which is similar to a WoF, but is issued for twelve months on new vehicles first registered as rental cars, twelve months on all eligible private heavy motorhomes regardless of age, and six months for all other vehicles unless another interval has been specified by the Transport Agency.

The inspections are carried out by approved testers at authorised repair shops, or in larger towns and cities, independent testing stations, the latter must be used if a vehicle has been defected by the Police (known as a green or pink sticker).

In addition to the above, if a used motor vehicle has never been registered in New Zealand, or has had its registration cancelled by the Transport Agency or the vehicles registered owner, it must go through a somewhat more invasive inspection by an approved agent before permission can be obtained to re register it for use on the road. A new 17 digit locally generated VIN number affixed by the agency's representative may also be required, it has been compulsory to have a VIN number on all required classes of vehicle registered or reregistered since May 1994.

== See also ==
- Automobile costs
- Automobile safety
- Under vehicle inspection
- Roadworthiness
