= Fraunhofer-Center for High Temperature Materials and Design HTL =

Research center in Bayreuth, Germany

Fraunhofer-Center for High Temperature Materials and Design
- Fraunhofer-Zentrum für Hochtemperatur-Leichtbau
- Type: Research institute
- Location: Bayreuth
- Director: Friedrich Raether
- Parent organization: Fraunhofer Institute for Silicate Research
- Staff: 105 (2017)
- Website: www.htl.fraunhofer.de www.htl-enertherm.eu

The Fraunhofer Center for High Temperature Materials and Design is a research center of the Fraunhofer Institute for Silicate Research in Würzburg, a research institute of the Fraunhofer Society. It predominantly conducts research in high temperature technologies energy-efficient heating processes and thus contributes to sustainable technological progress. It is headquartered in Bayreuth and has additional locations in Würzburg and Münchberg.

== History ==
The centre was founded in 2012 with the aim of pooling the ceramics research of the Fraunhofer ISC. Its research building in Bayreuth was opened in 2015 and funded by the Bavarian Ministry for Economic Affairs, the German Federal Ministry of Education and Research, and the European Regional Development Fund. In 2014, the Fraunhofer Application Center for Textile Fiber Ceramics (TFK) was founded in cooperation with the Hof University of Applied Sciences. Since 2017, the premises of the Fraunhofer-Center HTL in Bayreuth are being extended by a technical center with a fiber pilot plant, which is to be completed in late 2019. The costs for this plant amount to 20 Million Euros, which are predominantly taken over by the Bavarian Ministry for Economic Affairs and the German Federal Ministry of Education and Research. The plant itself is a one-of-its-kind in Europe and its goal is to open production of ceramic fibers in Europe.

== Research areas ==
The Fraunhofer-Center HTL has two business areas: Thermal Process Technology and CMC's (Ceramic matrix composites). One of the applications of CMC's are, for instance, the production of ceramic brakes, which currently are expensive in production, and the Fraunhofer-Center HTL is currently researching ways to reduce costs therein. In the CMC business field, HTL has a closed manufacturing chain from fibre development to textile fibre processing to matrix construction to finishing and coating of CMC components. CMC are characterised by high operating temperatures, corrosion resistance and damage tolerance and are therefore used to improve high-temperature processes. In addition, processes such as 3D printing are also available at the Fraunhofer Centre HTL for the production of metal and ceramic components with complex geometries. To test high-temperature materials and optimise their manufacturing processes, the Fraunhofer Centre HTL is developing ThermoOptic Measuring (TOM) furnaces. Materials and components can also be characterised using various non-destructive and mechanical as well as thermal testing methods.

== Focus of work ==
=== Materials ===
- Material design: Calculation of the application properties of multiphase materials
- Ceramics: development of oxide, non-oxide and silicate ceramics along the entire manufacturing chain
- Metal-ceramic composites: Development of metal components and composites
- Ceramic fibres: Development of ceramic fibres from laboratory scale to pilot scale
- Ceramic coatings: Development and characterisation of liquid coating varnishes on behalf of customers and for sampling purposes

=== Components ===
- Component design: Design of components made of ceramics, metals or composites using finite element (FE) modelling
- CMC components: Design and fabrication of CMC components using carbon, silicon carbide or oxide ceramic fibres
- 3D printing: manufacturing of prototypes and small series from ceramics, metals or metal-ceramic composites

=== Manufacturing processes ===
- Textile technology: development of textile processing methods for inorganic fibres including sampling
- Heat processes: In-situ characterisation of the behaviour of solids and melts during the heating process as well as process optimisation
- Application firings: Conducting test firings and application firings in defined atmospheres

=== Characterisation ===
- Materials testing: Non-destructive, mechanical and thermal measurement of the composition, microstructure and application properties of materials
- ThermoOptic Measurement (TOM): Simulation of industrial heat treatment processes in the temperature range from room temperature to over 2000 °C and in all relevant furnace atmospheres
- Industrial furnace analysis: recording of the energy balance as well as the temperature and atmosphere distribution in the production furnace

== Infrastructure ==
=== Location Bayreuth ===
At the Fraunhofer Centre HTL in Bayreuth, 80 office workplaces are available on an area of approx. 600 m^{2}. The technical centre comprises 15 laboratories and halls on an area of approx. 2000 m^{2}. Specialised technical equipment is in use there. These include:

- approx. 40 different industrial furnaces
- twelve thermo-optical measureing systems (TOM) specially developed at the HTL
- Stereolithography printers for ceramic components
- Powder bed printers for ceramics and metals
- CMC processing equipment
- equipment for non-destructive testing (computer tomography with a 225 kV and 450 kV radiation source, terahertz technology, ultrasound diagnostics, thermography)
- five-axis machining centre
- laser sintering system

The fibre pilot plant opened at the Bayreuth site in 2019 increases the pilot plant area of the Fraunhofer Centre HTL by approx. 1200 m^{2} and is used for the production of ceramic reinforcement fibres and the development of new high-temperature resistant fibre types.

=== Location Würzburg ===
In the premises of the parent institute Fraunhofer ISC in Würzburg, the HTL has 20 office workstations, three laboratories and a pilot plant with an area of 630 m^{2}. The facilities and spinning towers operated in Würzburg are used to develop ceramic fibres and ceramic coatings on a laboratory and pilot plant scale.

=== Location Münchberg ===
On the site of the Institute for Material Sciences ifm at Hof University of Applied Sciences, the Fraunhofer Centre HTL has 14 office workplaces as well as four laboratories and four pilot plants with an area of over 5,500 m^{2}. A total of ten weaving looms of different sizes and types, a variable braiding machine, a double rapier weaving machine with single thread control and numerous systems for testing fibres, rovings and textiles are used.

== Cooperations ==
- Fraunhofer-Allianz AdvanCer
- Fraunhofer-Allianz Energie
- Fraunhofer-Allianz Leichtbau
- Fraunhofer-Allianz Textil
