= İhsan Sabuncuoğlu =

Turkish engineering academic (born 1958)

- Born: 16 August 1958 (age 68); Çorum, Turkey
- Education: Middle East Technical University (BS, MS); Wichita State University (PhD)
- Occupations: Turkish academic, university rector and industrial engineer
- Scientific career
- Fields: Industrial Engineering
- Workplaces: Bilkent University; Carnegie Mellon University; IFMA; Abdullah Gül University; TED University

İhsan Sabuncuoğlu (born 16 August 1958) is a Turkish academic in Industrial Engineering. He is the founding and former rector of Abdullah Gül University in Kayseri, Turkey and now he is the rector of TED University. Relying on the database of Web Of Science (WOS/all databases), he is appraised as one of three highly successful Turkish industrial engineers regarding to his h index point of scientific productivity.

== Biography ==
He received his B.S. and M.S degrees from Middle East Technical University, in 1982 and 1984, respectively, and his Ph.D. degree from Wichita State University in 1989. İhsan Sabuncuoğlu worked for Boeing, Pizza Hut and the National Institute of Health in the United States during his PhD studies. He joined Bilkent University in 1990. Between 1990 and 2013, he was a full-time faculty member at Bilkent University Industrial Engineering Department, where he became the chairman in 2006.

He was the chairman of the first engineering department to be accredited by ABET in Turkey. In the meantime, he held visiting positions at Carnegie Mellon University in the United States, and at Institut Français de Mecanique Avancee (IFMA) in France.

As a person who highly gives importance to university-industry collaboration, he established university-industry collaboration center (USIM) in 2010. In addition to his appearance in the assessment committees of TÜBİTAK and KOSGEB, he gave consultancy services to major manufacturing and service companies for productivity improvement. He also acted as the conference chair in several industrial engineering conferences and workshops that were held in Turkey and worldwide.

Dr. Sabuncuoğlu is a member of the Institute of Industrial Engineers (IIE) and Alpha Pi Mu.

He is married to Semra Sabuncuoğlu and has two children, Kerem and Arda.

=== Research ===
Sabuncuoğlu teaches and conducts research in the areas of simulation, scheduling and applications of optimization models to health care problems such as cancer screening and targeted drug delivery. His research on cancer related health-care problems are funded by TÜBİTAK and EUREKA. Dr.Sabuncuoğlu also has significant industrial experience in aerospace, automative, FMCG and military based defence systems. His industrial projects are sponsored by over hundred of both national and international companies.

He is also the founding director of the Bilkent University Industry and the University Collaboration Center (USIM) and the chair of Advanced Machinery and Manufacturing Group (MAKITEG) at TÜBİTAK.
