= TED University =

University in Ankara, Turkey

Coordinates: 39.9227°N 32.8619°E

- TED Üniversitesi
- Motto: Geleceğe Hazır Bireyler İçin Yenilikçi Eğitim
- Motto in English: Innovative Education for Future-Ready Individuals
- Type: Private liberal arts college
- Established: 7 July 2009; 17 years ago
- Affiliations: Turkish Education Association
- Rector: İhsan Sabuncuoğlu
- Academic staff: 439
- Students: 4848
- Location: Ankara, Turkey
- Campus: 24.179 square metres; Urban
- Language: English
- Website: tedu.edu.tr

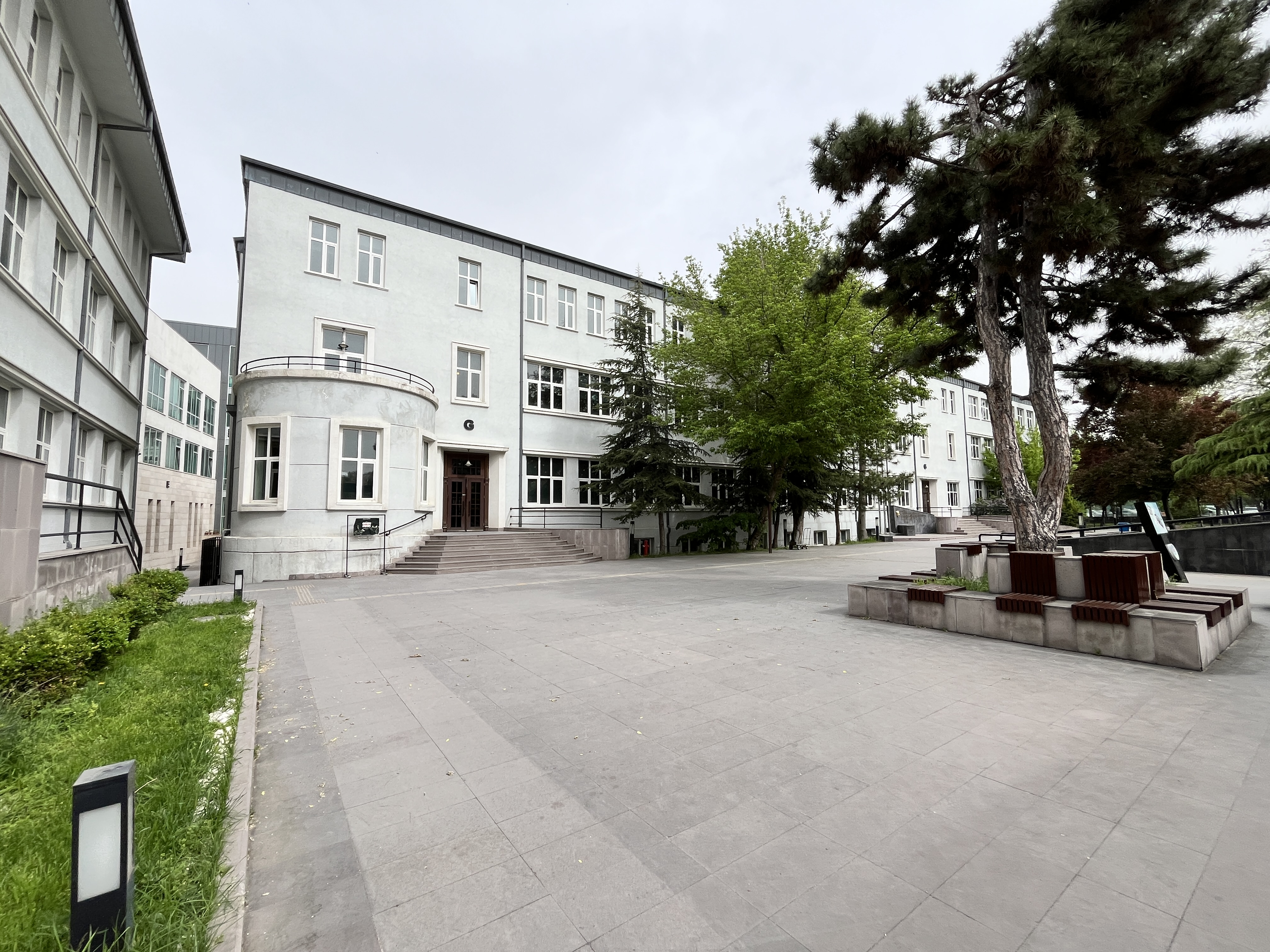
TED University

TED University is a private, non-profit university located in Ankara, Turkey. Established by the Turkish Education Association Higher Education Foundation on July 7, 2009, it began offering education in the 2012–2013 academic year with an initial cohort of 320 students.

The university conducts its programs in English and is the second institution in Turkey to adopt a liberal arts-style education model, following Sabancı University. In 2021, it was one of three foundation universities in Turkey accredited by the Higher Education Quality Board, alongside Koç University and Bilkent University.

== Academic units ==
=== Faculties ===
Sources:

- Faculty of Education
- Faculty of Engineering
- Faculty of Arts and Sciences
- Faculty of Economics and Administrative Sciences
- Faculty of Architecture and Design

=== Schools ===
Sources:

- English Language School
- Graduate School

=== Centers and Units ===
- Research Technology Innovation Directorate
- Center for Gender Studies
- Human Research Ethics Committee
- Sustainable TEDU
- Unit for Global South Studies
- İstasyonTEDU Center for Social Innovation
- Center of Applied Data Science (CADS@TEDU)

== Student clubs and societies ==
=== Societies ===
A student club presentation is organised for all TED University students during Orientation Week, which takes place just before the start of the course. At the booths, student clubs have the opportunity to introduce themselves. These include clubs such as the Photography Club and the Outdoor Sports Club, as well as global student clubs such as the Google Developers Student Club and IEEE.

=== Science Project Teams ===
- ALECTED Science Project Team
- TEDU Aviation Science Project Team

=== Sports Teams ===
Students can participate in various sports teams after going through an trying out process. The university organises a range of sporting events and competitions across different sports. The teams follow a logical sequence of activities, ensuring direct and unambiguous communication. The most famous team representing the university is the TED University Basketball team. Furthermore, the university maintains a formal tone while adhering to specific language standards, including metrics and units. Additionally, there are teams for indoor and outdoor sports, including football, futsal, rugby, and quidditch.
