= Dedeman Hotels =

International hotel and resort chain

Dedeman Hotels & Resorts International is an international chain of hotels and resorts and a subsidiary of the Turkish family business Dedeman Group. The company's first hotel was the Dedeman Ankara opened in 1966. The company operates at 15 locations across Turkey and in Kazakhstan and Iraq. Three more hotels are currently under construction in Turkey and Russia, all scheduled to open in 2015.
