= Akfen Holding =

Turkish infrastructure conglomerate

- Type: Conglomerate
- Industry: Infrastructure
- Founded: 1976
- Founder: Hamdi Akın
- Headquarters: Ankara-Istanbul, Turkey
- Website: www.akfen.com.tr

Akfen Holding is an infrastructure focused conglomerate based in Turkey, founded in 1976 by Hamdi Akın and earned its status as a holding company in 1999.

The group often partners with leading multinationals and organizations like PSA International, Accor Hotels, IFM Investors, EBRD and IFC.

== Current portfolio ==
- MIP: the operator of Mersin's container port until 2056, Akfen holds a 10% stake in MIP.
- IDO: the leading ferry operator in Turkey, Akfen and Tepe Group are equal partners in Istanbul Deniz Otobusleri.
- Akfen Renewables: a 700MW renewable electricity generation platform, publicly traded on Borsa Istanbul under the ticker symbol AKFYE. Akfen holds a 66.5% stake in AKFYE. Before its IPO, EBRD and IFC each held close to 17% of AKFYE.
- Akfen REIT: a REIT focused on city hotels under Accor brands Ibis and Novotel, publicly traded on Borsa Istanbul under the ticker symbol AKFGY. Akfen and its shareholders (Akın family) together hold a 55.5% stake in AKFGY. Akfen REIT issued the first convertible bond in Turkey.
- Acacia Mining: the owner & operator of Gökırmak copper mine project in Turkey's Kastamonu province, Akfen holds a 45.5% stake in Acacia Mining. Acacia received $145M in project financing from 3 banks (Société Générale, BNP Paribas, ING Group) in 2018, a first in the Turkish mining industry which relies heavily on equity.
- Akfen Construction: the construction company for various group activities, Akfen holds 100% of Akfen Construction. The company entered into a PPP to build 3 large-scale hospitals and leasing them back to the Turkish Ministry of Health for 25 years: the 755-bed Isparta City Hospital, the 1081-bed Eskişehir City Hospital and the 566-bed Tekirdağ City Hospital. Overall investment made by Akfen for these 3 hospitals amount to $1.1B.

== Notable investments ==
TAV Airports

Founded by Tepe Group, Akfen Group and Vienna Airports in 1997, TAV Airports won the tender to build Istanbul Atatürk Airport, one of the first examples of BOT projects in the world.

Following the growth of airport tenders in Turkey based on the BOT model, TAV quickly built a portfolio of airport concessions.

TAV grew by creating an ecosystem of companies around airport operations:

- ATÜ to operate duty-free shops within airports (a joint-venture with Heinemann)
- BTA to offer food & beverage services within airports
- TGS to offer airport ground services (a joint-venture with Turkish Airlines)
- Havaş to offer shuttle services between airports and city centers

Akfen exited its investment in TAV to Aeroports de Paris Group in two installments, it sold 38% of TAV for $874M in 2012 and its remaining 8% for $160M in 2017.

Mersin International Port (MIP)

Founded by Akfen Group and PSA International in 2007, MIP won the 36-year privatization tender for Mersin's container port for $755M.

When the consortium took over the port's operations, it handled 400,000 TEU. In 10 years, MIP grew the handled load to 1,600,000 TEU through significant capacity increases.

Akfen partially exited its investment in MIP, it sold 40% of MIP to Australian infrastructure fund IFM Investors for $869M.

TÜVTÜRK

Founded by TÜV SÜD, Doğuş Group and Akfen Group in 2007, TÜVTÜRK won the tender for a 20-year monopoly for periodic vehicle inspections in Turkey starting from 2007.

Akfen exited its investment in TÜVTÜRK, it sold its 33% stake in TÜVTÜRK to Bridgepoint Group for an undisclosed sum.

== Social responsibility ==
Turkey Human Resources Foundation (TİKAV) was founded in 1999. TIKAV, which was founded by the Akin Family, conducts studies on bringing up socially and culturally well-equipped youngsters that are studying in the universities of the East and Southeast Region of Turkey, and raising the leaders of the future. The Foundation actualizes Akfen Holding's social responsibility projects.
