= TÜVTÜRK =

Turkish monopoly corporation

TÜVTÜRK was established as a joint venture of the German TÜV Süd, the Doğuş Holding and the construction company Akfen. The company was founded in 2007 after the Turkish Government decided to implement the EU regulation on vehicle safety as defined in 96/96/EC of 20 December 1996 in 2005. After a bidding process, the new company won the tender for a 20-year monopoly for periodic vehicle inspections in Turkey from 2007 onwards. It will end its operations in 2027, And MOI-OGG Joint Company's Turka brand will be place for 20-year monopoly,Starting from 15 August,similar as TÜVTÜRK.

As required from the contract, TÜVTÜRK did build up hundreds of new inspection stations - by 2017 it reached a point of 207 fixed and 16 mobile stations where 3500 employees are responsible for 14 million inspections annually (including the main inspections of 8 million vehicles). The shift in inspection regulations was rather sharp - in the first year, 47 percent of vehicles were not able to pass the first inspection, even though regulations had been initially eased until 2013, for example about scratches on the front windscreen as damages had been very common on the rural streets in the Anatolian hinterland.

The introduction of the new inspection scheme was accompanied by an extensive propaganda campaign and through connections with the German Turks it was hoped that the population would better understand that inspections were to become much more detailed but passable, hence the naming of the company as if being a "TÜV" subsidiary. Actually, just like its German model, TÜVTÜRK is organized in a northern and a southern branch - namely TÜVTÜRK Kuzey Taşıt Muayene İstasyonları Yapım Ve İşletim (northern) and TÜVTÜRK Güney Taşıt Muayene İstasyonları Yapım Ve İşletim (southern), both based in İstanbul.
