= Valencian International University =

Private international university in Valencia, Spain

Valencian International University (VIU)
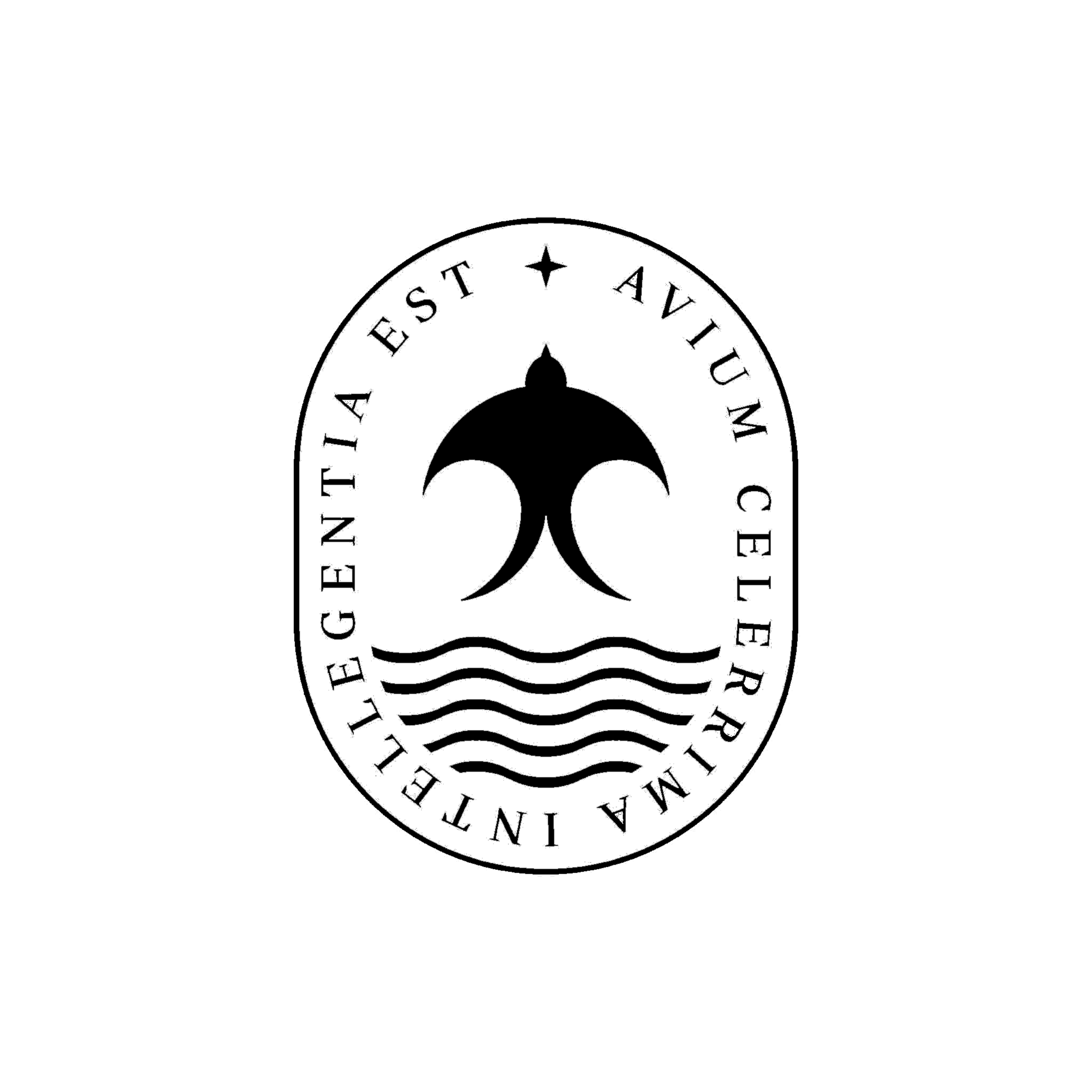
- Seal of the Valencian International University
- Motto: Avium Celerrima Intellegentia Est
- Motto in English: Your on-line audiovisual university
- Type: Private
- Established: 2008
- Chancellor: Javier Viciano
- Location: Valencia, Valencian Community, Spain
- Campus: Online, non campus
- Nickname: VIU
- Website: www.universidadviu.com/es/
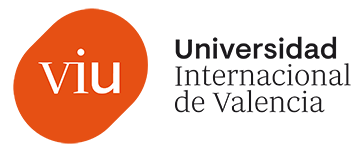

The Valencian International University (VIU) is a private university in Spain with an international remit. It was founded by the regional government of Valencia in 2008. 70% of it was later acquired by the Planeta publishing house. The university is officially recognized by the Spanish Ministry of Education. It is headquartered in Valencia, Spain.

VIU is a distance synchronous learning institution. The teaching and learning is conducted exclusively online, with students receiving real-time classes through their computer or device via interactive video conferences which are streamed directly from campus. Nonetheless, lessons are recorded for off-time viewing by pupils. The teacher/pupil relationship is interactive, personalized and analogous to that of a physical campus. Some programs do require partial in-person attendance, such as the school experience component of teacher training programs.

== Academics ==
The Valencian International University offers Undergraduate (Bachelors) and Postgraduate (Masters) programs as well as non-degree granting courses (including expert courses, inter-university certificate programs and the university's many short courses). The university, whose offer has been increasing since its foundation in 2008, has a strong focus on education and teacher training. As of 2015, students can sit their examinations in nine locations in Spain. Some of the programs are taught in English.

=== Departments ===
VIU is organized into five departments:

- Department of Arts and Humanities
- Department of Engineering and Architecture
- Department of Health Sciences
- Department of Science
- Department of Social Sciences and Law

=== Undergraduate ===
The following are VIU's undergraduate degree programs for the 2013-14 school year:

Arts and Humanities

- History
- Musicology
- Bachelor's Degree in Humanities
- Translation and Interpretation
- Science and Technology

Computer Engineering

- Mathematics
- Industrial Organization Engineering

Health Sciences

- Speech Therapy (Audiology)
- Psychology

Economic and Administrative Sciences

- Business Administration and Management (BAM)
- Labor and Employment Relations
- Bachelor's Degree in Marketing

Law

- Criminology and Security Sciences
- International Relations
- Law

Communications

- Bachelor's Degree in Communication

=== Postgraduate ===
The following are VIU's postgraduate degree programs for the 2013-14 school year:

- Master in Astronomy and Astrophysics
- Master in Biotechnology of Human Assisted Reproduction and Embryology
- Master in Digital Marketing and E-Commerce (with the Barcelona International Management Business School)
- Master in Law and Legal Practice
- Master in Psychological Prevention and Intervention in School Behaviour Problems
- Master in Secondary and Sixth Form Teaching, Vocational Training and Language Teaching (Includes official teaching certification. Subjects: Geography and History; Spanish Language and Literature; Modern Foreign Language: English; Education Guidance; Music; Careers Guidance; Drawing; Physical Education; Mathematics and Computer Science)
- Master in Sports Journalism
- Master in The Social Research of Science Communication
- Master in Third Generation Psychological Therapies

=== Quality and assessment ===
All degrees and courses at VIU have met the quality standards stipulated by the National Agency for the Assessment of Quality (ANECA), as well as the recommendations and directives of the European Association for Quality Assurance in Higher Education (ENQA).

Assessment is compliant with the principles of the European Higher Education Area (EHEA), adapted to a virtual environment. VIU's academic recognition system is based on ECTS credits (European Credit Transfer and Accumulation System). The credit system measures the effort a student has to make in order to acquire the competence demanded by each subject.

== Technology ==
VIU is a technology campus university. The university's sophisticated technology platform (including its servers) is located in Barcelona, Spain. IT services are provided by Colt. VIU utilizes (and helps develop) the open source Sakai VLE (Virtual Learning Environment) to support its teaching, learning, research and collaboration. It has adapted and enriched Sakai's virtual campus in the creation of key distance learning tools, which include the Communications Centre (where students receive all types of notices from their professors); video conferences using Blackboard Collaborate (which allow students to attend real time lessons directly transmitted from the campus) and cutting-edge E-learning multimedia documents which combine voice, image and text.

The multimedia virtual campus includes a public and a private environment. The public area includes the university's Web Portal, while the private space includes four learning communities. These are spaces where teachers and students can collaborate on research or teaching endeavors. The private portal, called VIU space, is used by professors and students and includes the communications centre, calendar, personal details, virtual secretary, virtual communities and digital libraries. Instant messaging is done through Jabber.

In 2012, VIU was one of the recipients of the Sakai Foundation's 'Teaching with Sakai Innovation Award,' for 'ICT in Education'. The award rewards an innovative educational experience that 'by design, engages and challenges students.' VIU was the first Spanish university to receive such award, which includes winners from the world's premier educational institutions.
