= Uvis (given name) =

Male given name

- Gender: Male
- Language: Latvian
- Name day: 3 May

Origin
- Region of origin: Latvia

Other names
- Related names: Ulvis

Uvis is a Latvian masculine given name. People bearing the name include:

- Uvis Balinskis (born 1996), ice hockey player
- Uvis Helmanis (born 1972), basketball player
- Uvis Kalniņš (born 1993), swimmer
- Uvis Stazdiņš (born 1999), handball player
