= Magna Charta Universitatum =

1988 charter celebrating university traditions

- Ratified: 18 September 1988
- Location: Engrossed copy: University of Bologna
- Signatories: 975 universities (as of 2024)
- Purpose: reference for fundamental values and principles of universities, in particular including institutional autonomy and academic freedom

The Magna Charta Universitatum (Great Charter of Universities) is a two-page document produced by the University of Bologna and the European Rectors' Conference (now called the European University Association) in 1988 in Bologna, Italy. It identifies key principles that are asserted to be essential for the operation of universities, including academic freedom and institutional autonomy. Initially signed by the rectors of 388 higher education institutions, the number of signatories has subsequently grown to about 1000, with the aim to recognize and celebrate university traditions and to encourage cooperation among European universities. The document is intended to serve as a universal inspiration and is as such open to universities throughout the world and not only those located in Europe.

== History ==
The Magna Charta Universitatum Europaeum was formally signed by 388 university rectors on 18 September 1988 at Piazza Maggiore in Bologna, to commemorate the 900th anniversary of the founding of the University of Bologna. The final text of the document was drafted in January 1988 in Barcelona.

The Observatory Magna Charta Universitatum was established in 1998 and incorporated in 2000. It organised the first convention in 2001. 73 universities signed the charter at the annual convention on 18 September 2018, bringing the total to 889, with 13 more having been accepted in 2019. As of 2024 it has been signed by 975 universities from 94 countries.

== See also ==
- European University Association
- Bologna declaration
- Memorandum of understanding
