= Hof University =

German university

- Hochschule für Angewandte Wissenschaften Hof
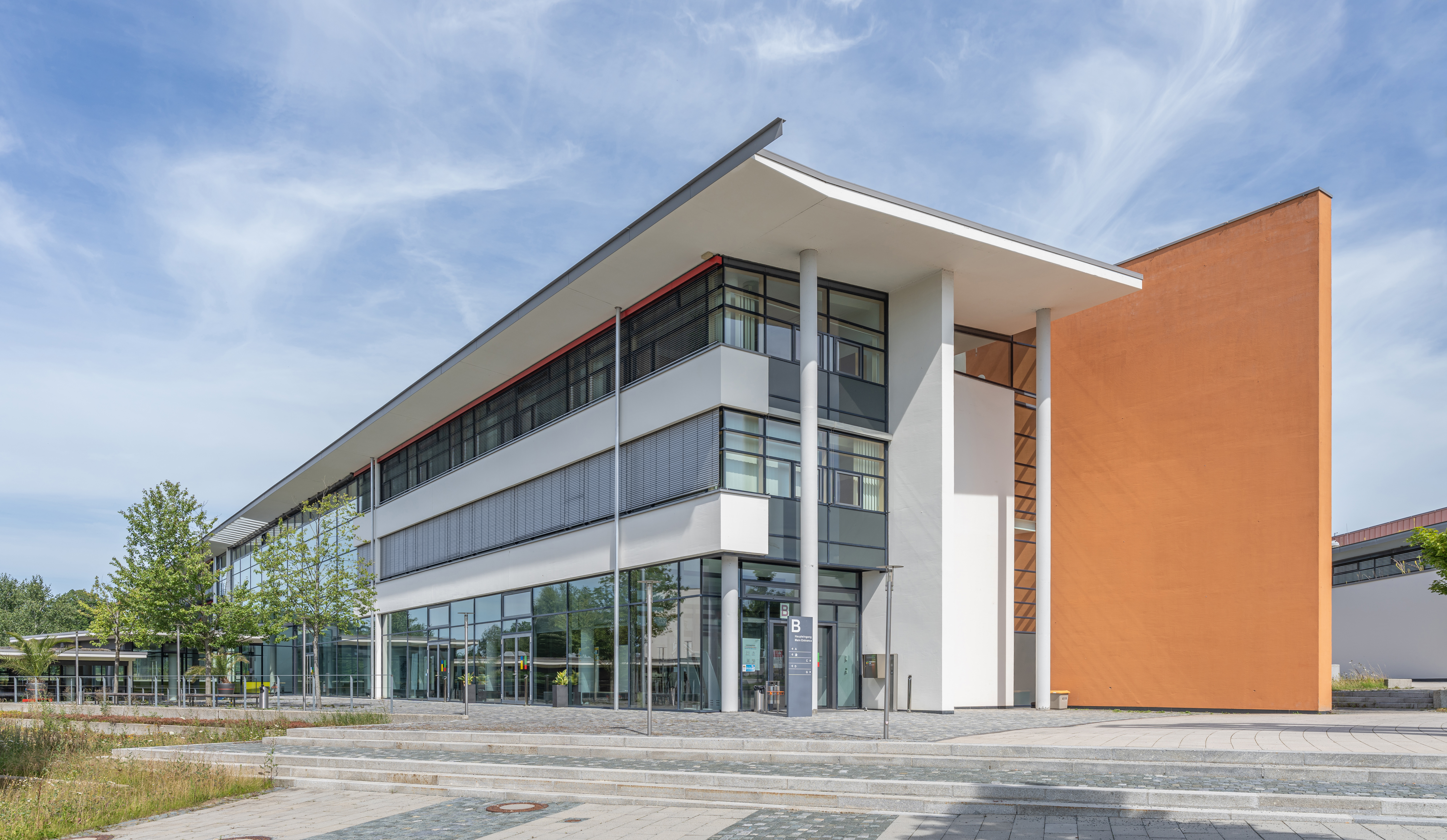
- Other names: University of Applied Sciences; Hof University of Applied Sciences; University of Applied Sciences Hof
- Established: 1994
- President: Jürgen Lehmann
- Academic staff: 70
- Administrative staff: 150
- Students: 3700 (2018)
- Location: Hof, Bavaria, Germany; 50°19′30″N 11°56′24″E
- Website: hof-university.de

Hof University, German: Hochschule Hof, full name Hochschule für Angewandte Wissenschaften Hof, is a public non-profit business, media and technical vocational university founded in 1994 in Upper Franconia, Bavaria, Germany.
