= TAV Airports Holding =

Airport Operator

TAV Havalimanları Holding A.Ş.
- Company type: Anonim Şirket
- Traded as: BİST: TAVHL
- Industry: Aviation
- Founded: 1997; 29 years ago
- Founder: Bilkent Holding; Akfen Holding
- Headquarters: Istanbul, Turkey
- Key people: Justine Coutard (Chairman); Serkan Kaptan (CEO)
- Services: Airport management Air traffic control
- Revenue: ▲€1.3 billion (2023)
- Net income: ▲€239 million (2023)
- Total assets: ▲€5.1 billion (2024)
- Total equity: ▲€1.6 billion (2024)
- Owner: Groupe ADP (46.12%) Bilkent Tepe (4.1%)
- Number of employees: 18,768
- Website: tavairports.com

TAV Airports Holding (Turkish: TAV Havalimanları Holding) is a Turkish airport operations and services company that is part of Groupe ADP. It is one of the world's largest airport operators, providing services to 1 million flights and 152 million passengers in 2018. Today, it is the leading airport operator in Turkey and also provides duty free, food and beverage, ground handling, IT and security services.

== History ==
TAV was established as a joint venture between Bilkent Holding's Tepe Construction, Akfen, and Airport Consulting Vienna in 1997.

In October 2011, TAV Airports was put for sale for €2 billion, with Credit Suisse handling the bid process. On March 12, 2012, TAV announced the planned sale of 38% of the firm's issued share capital to the group Aéroports de Paris for a total consideration of US$874 million. The sale value was determined based on the 32% premium of the company's latest closing price. The two companies provide service for 180 million passengers at 37 airports in total. Board Member and President & CEO Sani Şener continued in his position.

In January 2015, TAV Airports won the bid on the $1.1 billion project to increase Bahrain International Airport's capacity from 4 to 14 million, with a 51-month engagement to build it. In October 2015, TAV Airports won a 20-year lease of the Milas–Bodrum Airport with the bid price of €717 million. In the US, TAV made an entry by winning the bid for the duty-free areas of the George Bush Intercontinental Airport.

In January 2016, Sani Şener, CEO of TAV Airports Holding, announced its intention to penetrate the Iranian market. As of August 2016, TAV Airports was in negotiation with the Cuban government to create a consortium along with the French company Bouygues for the expansion and management of La Havana's José Martí International Airport. The deal would also include the development of the San Antonio de los Baños Airfield.

== Activities ==
In addition to operating 15 airports, TAV is involved in duty-free sales, food and beverage services, ground handling services, information technologies, security, and operation services.

In 2010, 55% of the firm's consolidated revenues were non-aviational. It generated €753 million consolidated revenues. The company's shares have been listed on the Istanbul Stock Exchange since February 23, 2007, under the "TAVHL" ticker symbol.

== Airports operated ==
Logo of TAV Airports Holding

As of May 2020, TAV operates the following airports:

Croatia

- Zagreb Franjo Tuđman Airport

Georgia

- Alexander Kartveli Batumi International Airport
- Shota Rustaveli Tbilisi International Airport

Kazakhstan

- Almaty International Airport

Latvia

- Riga International Airport

North Macedonia

- Ohrid St. Paul the Apostle Airport
- Skopje International Airport

Saudi Arabia

- Prince Mohammad bin Abdulaziz - Medina International Airport

Tunisia

- Enfidha–Hammamet International Airport
- Monastir Habib Bourguiba International Airport

Turkey

- Ankara Esenboğa Airport
- Gazipaşa–Alanya Airport
- İzmir Adnan Menderes Airport
- Istanbul Atatürk Airport
- Milas–Bodrum Airport
