= Under vehicle inspection =

An under-vehicle inspection (UVI) system generally consists of imaging systems mounted on a roadway and used at facility access points, particularly at secure facilities. An under-vehicle inspection system is used to detect threats—such as bombs—that are hidden underneath vehicles. Cameras capture images of the undercarriage of the vehicle for manual or automated visual inspection by security personnel or systems.

The first under-vehicle inspection system was developed in the late 1980s as part of a joint program between the UK Home Office and Morfax Ltd (now a part of the Chemring Group). The system used black and white images from area scan cameras. The systems have since developed encompassing more advanced technologies such as database capabilities in 1994, automatic number-plate recognition (ANPR) in 1997, automatic change detection in 1999, colour imagery in 2005, and integrated chemical detection in 2012.

Under-vehicle inspection systems can be permanent (embedded in the road), fixed (attached to the road's surface) or portable (mobile).

== Terminology ==
Under vehicle inspection systems are known by the acronyms:

- UVI (under-vehicle inspection)
- UVIS (under-vehicle inspection systems)
- AUVIS (automated under-vehicle inspection systems)
- MUVIS (mobile under-vehicle inspection systems)
- UVSS (under vehicle surveillance system).
- CUVSS (colour under vehicle surveillance system)

The terms UVSS and CUVSS were trademarks of the Chemring Group until the rebranding of the Home Office project in 2011.

== How a typical system works ==
As the vehicle arrives at the checkpoint and drives over the imaging unit, the cameras capture images of the undercarriage and transmit them to the control unit which displays them on a monitor. The control unit and monitor can be located outside in proximity to the checkpoint or within the guardhouse.

Depending on the UVIS system, images of the vehicle’s undercarriage can be stored for later viewing or can be manipulated for closer inspection while the vehicle is detained.

Recently, UVIS systems have also integrated license plate recognition (LPR) software that can identify stolen or suspect vehicles, and help security personnel monitor suspected changes to the undercarriage of a returning vehicle. UVIS providers have also developed a variety of security add-ons such as external scene cameras to help personnel better detect, deter and communicate potential threats. Many systems also feature network integration, allowing the facility to access and use data from perimeter choke points for broader applications such as resource planning.

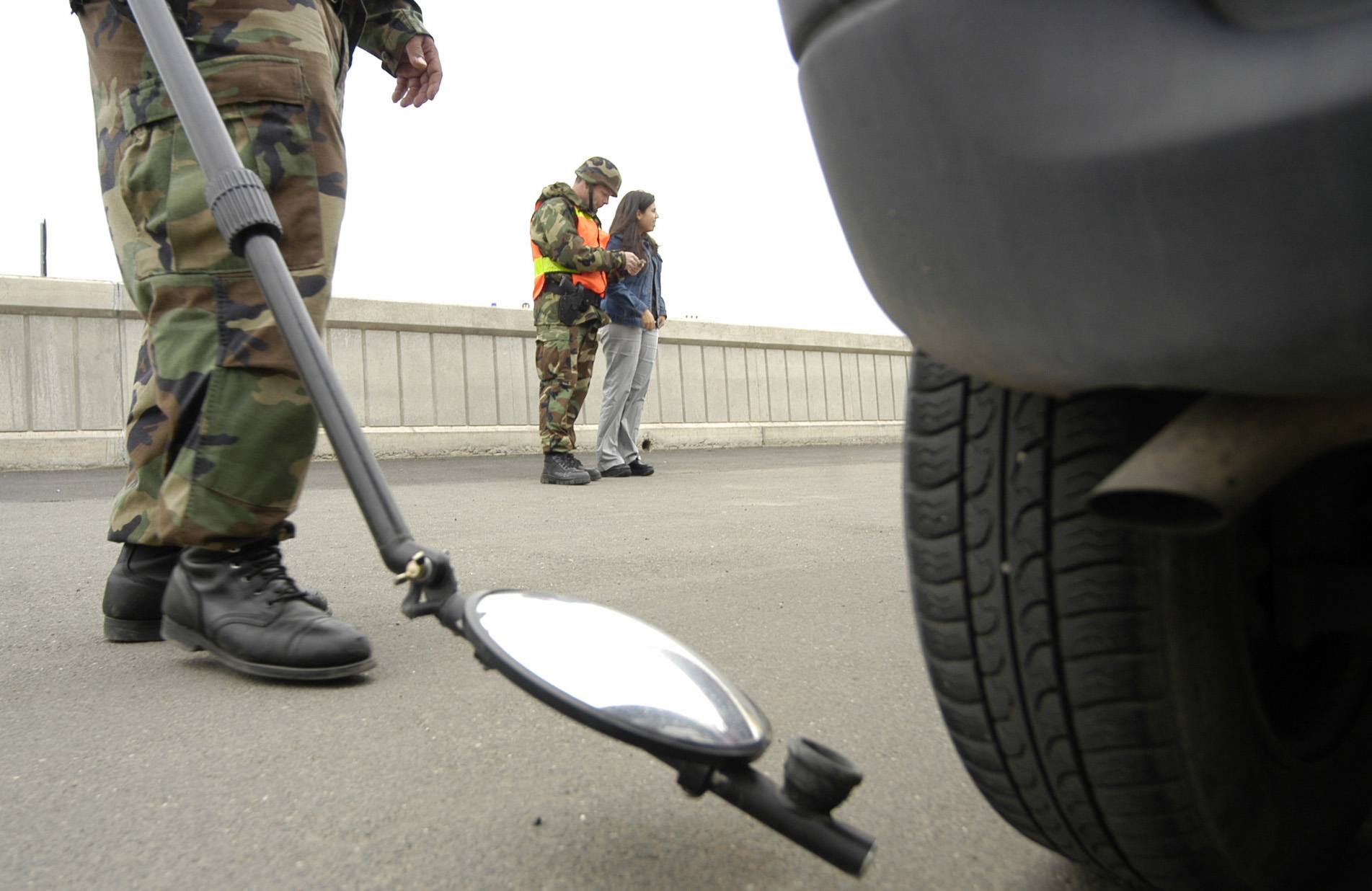
Handheld inspection mirror in use

Before the UVIS system, handheld mirrors were in use. While handheld mirrors are among the least expensive and oldest technologies, they have limited applications and place security personnel in close proximity to potential danger. Additionally, performing a thorough inspection of the vehicle’s undercarriage using handheld mirrors is both time-consuming and labor-intensive, taking up to several minutes per vehicle. More importantly, most mirrors provide a limited view of the undercarriage, failing to show screeners key areas toward the middle of the vehicle.

For applications such as border crossings, where the goal is to identify possible contraband movement, mirrors can often be used without compromising safety. However, depending on the vehicle and the type of mirror being used, contraband attached to certain areas of the undercarriage may easily escape detection.
