= List of architecture schools =

This is a list of architecture schools at colleges and universities around the world.

An architecture school (also known as a school of architecture or college of architecture), is a professional school or institution specializing in architectural education.

== Africa ==
=== Algeria ===
- Département d'architecture de l'université Benyoucef Benkhedda Algiers
- Département d'architecture de l'université Amar Telidji de Laghouat
- Département d'Architecture de l'université L'arbi Ben Mhidi Oum El Bouaghi
- Département d'architecture de l'université Med Khieder de Biskra
- Département d'Architecture de Sétif
- Département d'architecture du centre universitaire L'Arbi Tbessi de Tébessa
- Département d'Architecture de l'Université Hassiba Benbouali de Chlef
- École Polytechnique d'Architecture et d'Urbanisme (EPAU) d'Alger
- Institut d'architecture de Batna
- Institut d'architecture et d'urbanisme de l'université Saad Dahleb Blida
- Institut d'architecture de Mostaganem
- Institut d'architecture de Tizi-Ouzou
- Institut d'architecture de Tlemcen (Université d'Abou Bakr Belkaid, faculté des sciences de l'ingénieur), Tlemcen
- Institut d'Architecture et d'Urbanisme (IAUC) de Constantine

=== Cameroon ===
- École Supérieure Speciale d'Architecture du Cameroun (ESSACA) Yaoundé
- Université de Douala, Institut des Beaux-Arts.
- Université de Dschang, Institut des Beaux-Arts de Foumban.

=== Democratic Republic of the Congo ===
- Institut Supérieure d'Architecture Et d'Urbanisme (I.S.A.U), Gombe, Kinshasa
- Faculty of Architecture and Urbanism of the Université Catholique de Bukavu (UCB), Bukavu, South Kivu
- Université Panafricaine du Congo (U.PA.C), Mongafula, Kinshasa
- Académie des Beaux Arts (A.B.A), Gombe, Kinshasa
- Universite Kongo (U.K), Mbanza-ngungu, Kongo Central
- Universite Nouveaux Horizons (U.N.H), Lubumbashi, Haut-Katanga
- Université de Notre-Dame du Kasai (U.KA), Kananga, Kasaï-Central
- Institut national des bâtiments et travaux publics (INBTP) de Ngaliema, Kinshasa

=== Ghana ===
- Department of architecture, Faculty of Art and Built Environment, Kwame Nkrumah Un of Science and Technology, Kumasi
- Department of architecture of the Faculty of Art and built engineering, university of Ghana, Accra

=== Egypt ===
- Department of Architecture of the Faculty of Engineering, Al Azhar University, Cairo and Qena
- Department of Architecture in the German University (GUC), Cairo
- Department of Architecture of the Faculty of Engineering (HTI), 10th of Ramadan City
- Department of Architecture of the Faculty of Engineering, Ain Shams University, Abbaseya, Cairo
- Department of Architecture of the Faculty of Engineering, Alexandria University, Alexandria
- Department of Architecture of the Faculty of Engineering, Arab Academy for Science and Technology and Maritime Transport, Cairo and Alexandria
- Department of Architecture of the Faculty of Engineering, Suez Canal University, Ismailia
- Department of Architecture of the Faculty of Engineering, Assiut University, Assiut
- Department of Architecture of the Faculty of Engineering, Behira Higher Institute, BHI, Kilo 47 Alexandria, Cairo Desert Road
- Department of Architecture of the Faculty of Engineering, Benha University, Shoubra
- Department of Architecture of the Faculty of Engineering, Cairo Higher Institute, CHI, New Cairo, Cairo
- Department of Architecture of the Faculty of Engineering, Cairo University, Giza
- Department of Architecture of the Faculty of Engineering, El Shorouk Academy, Cairo, El Shorouk
- Department of Architecture of the Faculty of Engineering, Helwan University, Mattareya, Cairo
- Department of Architecture of the Faculty of Engineering, Higher Technological Institute (HTI), 10th of Ramadan City
- Department of Architecture of the Faculty of Engineering, Mansoura University, Mansoura
- Department of Architecture of the Faculty of Engineering, Menoufia University, Menoufia
- Department of Architecture of the Faculty of Engineering, Misr International University, Cairo
- Department of Architecture of the Faculty of Engineering, Misr University for Science and Technology (MUST), 6 October City
- Department of Architecture of the Faculty of Engineering, Modern Academy for Engineering and Technology, Maadi
- Department of Architecture of the Faculty of Engineering, MSA University, 6 October City, Cairo
- Department of Architecture of the Faculty of Engineering, Pharos University in Alexandria, Alexandria
- Department of Architecture of the Faculty of Engineering, Tanta University, Tanta
- Department of Architecture of the Faculty of Engineering, Zagazig University, Zagazig
- Department of Architecture of the Faculty of Fine Arts, Alexandria University, Alexandria
- Department of Architecture of the Faculty of Fine Arts, Helwan University, Zamalek, Cairo
- Department of Architecture of the Faculty of Fine Arts, Minia University, Minia
- Department of Architecture, School of Engineering, Université Française d'Égypte, Cairo
- Department of Architecture, School of Engineering, Future University in Egypt, FUE, Cairo
- Department of Construction and Architectural Engineering American University in Cairo, (AUC), Kattameya, Helwan
- Department of Architecture of the Faculty of Engineering, British University in Egypt, Sherouq

=== Kenya ===
- Jomo Kenyatta University of Agriculture and Technology, School of Architecture and Building Sciences, Department of Architecture
- Technical University of Kenya, Faculty of Engineering and the Built Environment, Department of Architecture and Environmental Design
- Technical University of Mombasa, Faculty of Engineering and Technology, Department of Building and Civil Engineering
- University of Nairobi, Department of Architecture, Faculty of Architecture and Design

=== Libya ===
- Benghazi University, Faculty of Engineering, Department of Architecture and Urban Planning, Benghazi
- Omar Al-Mukhtar University, Faculty of Art and Architecture, Department of Architecture and Planning, Derna, Al Fatah branch, Derna
- University of Tripoli, School of Applied Sciences, Department of Architecture and Civil Engineering, Tripoli

=== Mauritius ===
- École nationale supérieure d'architecture de Nantes Mauritius (ENSA Nantes Mauritius), UNICITI, Quatre Bornes

Ucsi University /Jr School Port Louis

=== Morocco ===
- Ecole d'Architecture de Casablanca, Casablanca
- Ecole Nationale d'Architecture, Rabat
- Ecole Supérieure de Design e des Arts Visuels Casablanca, Casablanca
- Ecole Nationale d'Architecture de Fès, Fez

=== Nigeria ===
==== Universities ====
- Abia State University, Uturu, Abia State
- Abubakar Tafawa Balewa University, Bauchi State
- Ahmadu Bello University, Zaria, Kaduna State
- Ambrose Alli University, Ekpoma, Edo State
- Anambra State University of Science and Technology, Anambra State
- Bells University of Technology, Ota, Ogun State
- Crescent University, Abeokuta, Ogun State
- Covenant University, Ota, Ogun State
- Cross River University of Technology, Cross River State
- Enugu State University of Science and Technology, Enugu State
- Federal University of Agriculture Makurdi, Beneu State
- Federal University of Technology, Akure, Ondo State
- Federal University of Technology Minna, Niger State
- Federal University of Technology Yola, Adamawa State
- Imo State University, Imo State
- Joseph Ayo Babalola University, Ipo Arakeji and Ikejì-arakeji, Osun State
- Kano University of Science and Technology, Kano State
- Ladoke Akintola University of Technology, Ogbomosho, Oyo State
- Nnamdi Azikiwe University, Awka, Anambra State
- Obafemi Awolowo University, Ile-Ife Osun State
- Olabisi Onabanjo University, Ago-iwoye, Ogun State
- Oluwatomisin Olamide Adeshiyan University, Lekki, Lagos State
- Redeemer's University, Ede, Osun State
- River State University of Science and Technology, Npkolu, River State
- University of Benin, Benin, Edo State
- University of Jos, Jos, Plateau State
- University of Lagos, Akoka, Lagos State
- University of Nigeria, Nsukka, Enugu State
- University of Uyo, Uyo, Akwa Ibom State

==== Polytechnics ====
- Abia State Polytechnic, Aba, Abia State
- Crown Polytechnic, Odo, Ekiti State
- Federal Polytechnic Ado-Ekiti, Ekiti State
- Federal Polytechnic Bida, Niger State
- Federal Polytechnic Ilaro, Ogun State
- Federal Polytechnic Nekede, Owerri, Imo State
- Federal Polytechnic Oko, Anambra State
- Kogi State Polytechnic, Kogi State
- Kwara State polytechnic, Ilorin, Kwara State
- Osun State Polytechnic, Iree, Osun State
- Lagos State Polytechnic, Ikorodu, Lagos State
- Moshood Abiola Polytechnic, Abeokuta, Ogun State
- The Oke-Ogun Polytechnic, Saki, Oyo State
- The Polytechnic, Ibadan, Oyo State
- Yaba College of Technology, Lagos State, Nigeria

==== Institute ====
- Ogun State Institute of Technology (formerly, Gateway Polytechnic) Igbesa, Ogun State

=== South Africa ===
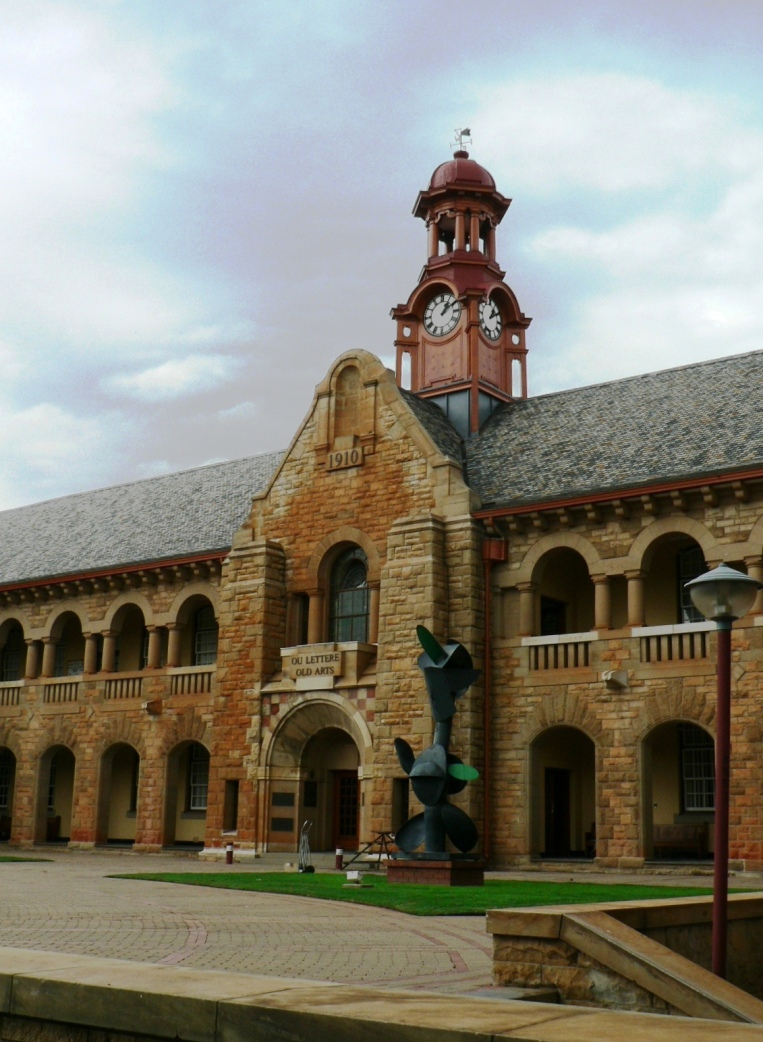
University of Pretoria Old Arts building

- School of Architecture, Planning and Geomatics, University of Cape Town, Cape Town.
- Faculty of Engineering and the Built Environment, Durban University of Technology, Durban.
- Department of Architecture, University of the Free State, Bloemfontein.
- Department of Architecture, University of Johannesburg, Johannesburg.
- School of Architecture, Planning and Housing, University of KwaZulu-Natal, Durban.
- School of Architecture, Nelson Mandela University, Port Elizabeth.
- Department of Architecture, University of Pretoria, Pretoria.
- Department of Architecture, Tshwane University of Technology, Pretoria.
- School of Architecture and Planning, University of the Witwatersrand, Johannesburg.

=== Sudan ===
- Faculty of Architecture, College of Engineering, University of Khartoum, Khartoum
- Faculty of Architecture, Autocratic University, Khartoum
- Faculty of Architecture, National Ribat University, Khartoum
- College of Engineering Sciences, Department of Architecture and Planning, Omdurman Islamic University
- Faculty of Architecture, Future University Khartoum, Khartoum
- Department of Architecture, University of Science and Technology, Khartoum
- Faculty of Architecture, National University, Khartoum
- Faculty of Architecture, University of Medical Sciences and Technology, Khartoum
- Faculty of Architecture, AlMughtaribeen University, Khartoum
- Faculty of Architecture, Department of Architecture and Engineering, The University of Bahri, Khartoum
- Faculty of Architecture, Department of Engineering, Sudan International University, Khartoum
- Faculty of Architecture, University of Garden City, Khartoum
- Faculty of Architecture, Sharg El Neil College, Khartoum

=== Tanzania ===
- Ardhi University
- University of Dar es Salaam
- Mbeya University Of Science and Technology

=== Togo ===
- Ecole Africaine des Métiers d'Architecture et d'Urbanisme (EAMAU) à Lomé

=== Tunisia ===
- ecole nationale d'architecture et d'urbanisme, Department of Architecture

=== Uganda ===
- College of Engineering, Design, Art and Technology, Makerere University, Kampala
- Faculty of the Built Environment, Uganda Martyrs University, Nkozi
- Faculty of lands and architecture, Kyambogo University

== Asia ==
=== Bangladesh ===
- Bangabandhu Sheikh Mujibur Rahman Science and Technology University Department of Architecture, Gopalganj
- Bangladesh University of Engineering & Technology, Department of Architecture, Faculty of Architecture and Planning, Dhaka
- Chittagong University of Engineering and Technology, Department of Architecture, Faculty of Architecture & Planning, Chittagong
- Dhaka University of Engineering & Technology, Gazipur Department of Architecture, Dhaka
- Hajee Mohammad Danesh Science & Technology University Department of Architecture, Dinajpur
- Khulna University of Engineering & Technology, Department of Architecture, Faculty of Architecture & Planning Khulna
- Khulna University, Discipline of Architecture, School of Science, Engineering & Technology, Khulna
- Military Institute of Science and Technology, Department of Architecture, Dhaka
- Pabna University of Science & Technology, Department of Architecture, Pabna
- Rajshahi University of Engineering and Technology, Department of Architecture, Rajshahi
- Shahjalal University of Science and Technology, Department of Architecture, School of Applied Sciences & Technology, Sylhet
- Ahsanullah University of Science and Technology, Department of Architecture, Dhaka
- American International University Bangladesh, Department of Architecture, Dhaka
- Bangladesh University, Department of Architecture, Dhaka
- Brac University, Department of Architecture, Dhaka
- Daffodil International University, Department of Architecture, Dhaka
- Leading University, Department of Architecture, Sylhet
- North South University, Department of Architecture, Dhaka
- Premier University, Chittagong, Department of Architecture, Chittagong
- Primeasia University, Department of Architecture, Dhaka
- Shanto-Mariam University of Creative Technology, Department of Architecture, Dhaka
- Sonargaon University, Department of Architecture, Dhaka
- Southeast University, Department of Architecture, Dhaka
- Stamford University, Department of Architecture, Dhaka
- State University of Bangladesh, Department of Architecture, Dhaka
- University of Asia Pacific, Department of Architecture, Dhaka

=== China ===
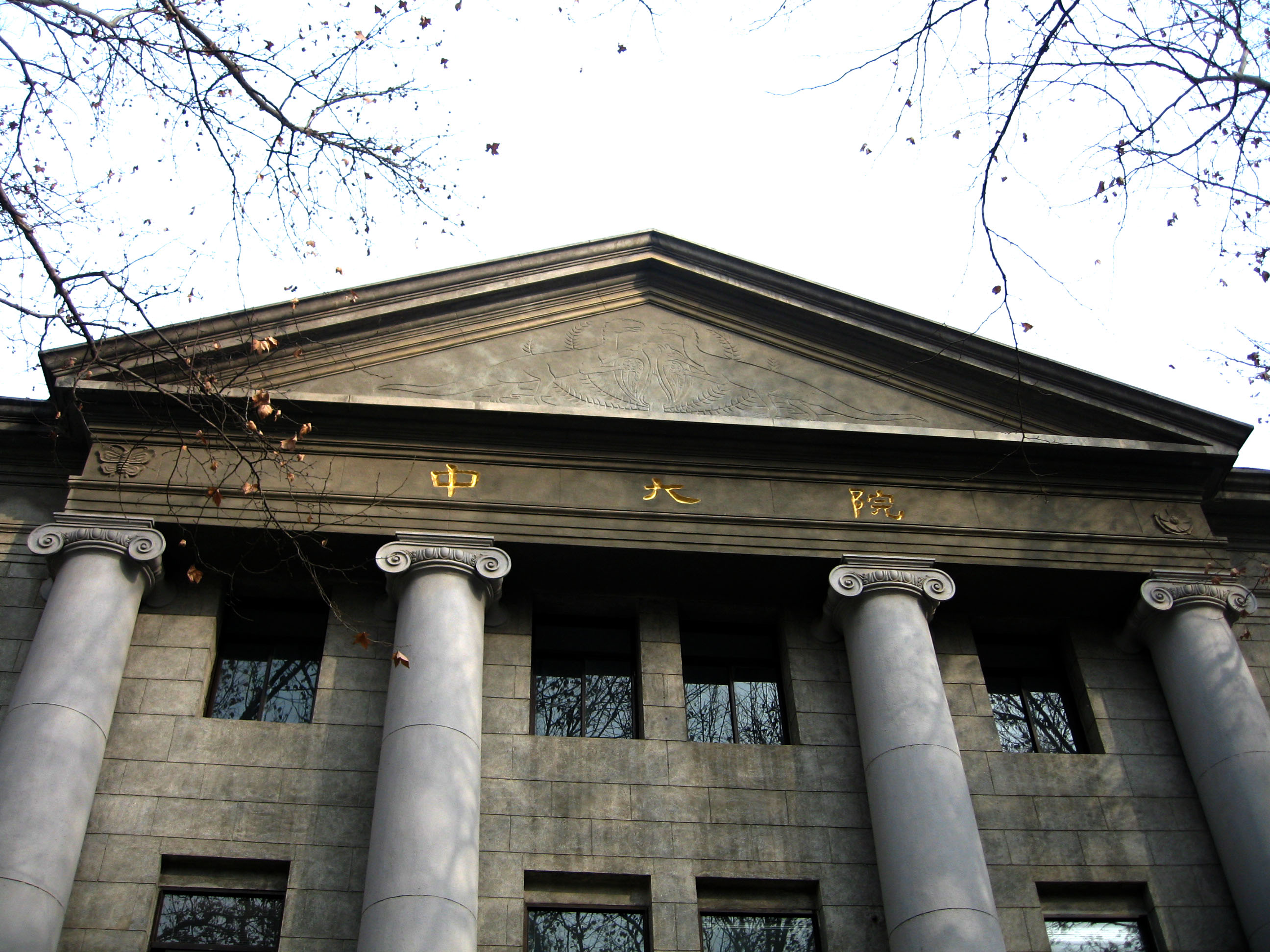
Zhongda Hall, the building of SEU School of Architecture

- Chongqing University, Architecture and Construction College, Shapingba, Chongqing
- Fuzhou University, College of Architecture, Fuzhou
- Harbin Institute of Technology (HIT) School of Architecture, Harbin, Heilongjiang
- Huazhong University of Science and Technology, College of Architecture and Urban Planning, Wuhan
- South China University of Technology (SCUT), School of Architecture and Civil Engineering, Guangzhou
- Southeast University (SEU), School of Architecture, Nanjing, Jiangsu Province
- Suzhou University of Science and Technology, School of Architecture and Urban Planning, Suzhou, Jiangsu
- Tianjin University (TJU), School of Architecture, Tianjin
- Tongji University, College of Architecture and Urban Planning, Shanghai
- Tsinghua University (THU), School of Architecture, Department of Architecture, Beijing
- Xi'an Jiaotong Liverpool University (XJTLU), Department of Architecture (XLarch), Suzhou, Jiangsu
- Xi'an Jiaotong University, Department of Architecture, Xi'an
- Xi'an University of Architecture and Technology, School of Architecture, Xi'an
- Zhejiang University, College of Civil Engineering and Architecture, Hangzhou, Zhejiang Province
- Zhengzhou University, School of Architecture, Zhengzhou
- Zhejiang University of Science and Technology, School of Civil Engineering and Architecture, Hangzhou
- Inner Mongolia University Of Technology, School of Architecture, Hohhot

==== Hong Kong ====
These are the only three universities offering accredited Master of Architecture for architect professional registration.

- The Chinese University of Hong Kong, School of Architecture, Hong Kong, founded in 1992
- The University of Hong Kong, Faculty of Architecture, Department of Architecture, Hong Kong, founded in 1950
- Chu Hai College of Higher Education, Faculty of Science and Engineering, Department of Architecture, Hong Kong, founded in 1949

=== India ===
In India, the Council of Architecture regulates the architectural education and maintains a registry of higher education institutions approved to offer 5-year long Bachelor of Architecture and 2-year long Master of Architecture degrees. Bachelor of Architecture degree is required for registration as an architect with the Council of Architecture, which also regulates the practice of architecture. Master of Architecture is often required to teaching architecture at the collegiate level.

- O. P. Jindal Global University, Sonipat, Haryana, India
- Jindal School of Art and Architecture, New Delhi, Haryana, India

=== Indonesia ===
- Atma Jaya University, Yogyakarta
- Bandung Institute of Technology, Bandung
- Binus University, Jakarta
- Brawijaya University, Malang
- Diponegoro University, Semarang
- Gadjah Mada University, Yogyakarta
- Hasanuddin University, Makasar
- Indonesia University of Education, Bandung
- Lambung Mangkurat University, Banjarmasin
- Palangkaraya University, Palangka Raya
- Pancasila University, Jakarta
- Parahyangan Catholic University, Bandung
- Sam Ratulangi University, Menado
- Sebelas Maret University, Surakarta
- Sepuluh November Institute of Technology, Surabaya
- Soegijapranata Catholic University, Semarang
- Tadulako University, Palu
- Tanjung Pura University, Pontianak
- Tanri Abeng University, Jakarta
- Tarumanagara University, Jakarta
- Trisakti University, Jakarta
- Universitas Islam Indonesia, Yogyakarta
- University of Indonesia, Jakarta
- University of North Sumatra, Sumatra Utara
- Udayana University, Denpasar, Bali
- Universitas Islam Negeri Maulana Malik Ibrahim, Malang, Jawa Timur
- Mercu Buana University, Meruya, Jakarta

=== Iran ===
Tarbiat Modares University, Tehran

- Art, Architecture University, Department of Architecture
- Azad Bam University
- Azad Kerman University
- Azad Mashad University, Art & Architecture University, Department of Architecture, Mashad
- Azad Shiraz University
- Azad Tehran University, Art & Architecture University, Department of Architecture, Tehran
- Azad University, South Tehran Branch
- Eshragh University, Faculty of Architecture, Department of Architecture, Bojnourd
- Hafez Higher Education Institute of Shiraz
- Imam Khomeini International University, Architecture, Urbanism, Qazvin
- Iran University of Science and Technology (IUST), Faculty of Architecture, Department of Architecture and Urban Planning, Tehran
- Islamic Azad University (Anar branch) Department of Architecture
- Islamic Azad University, Mashhad
- Islamic Azad University of Khorasgan (Isfahan)
- Islamic Azad University of Noor
- Islamic Azad University of Qazvin (QIAU)
- Islamic Azad University of Bandar Anzali (IAU Anzali)
- Islamic Azad University of Shahrood
- Islamic Azad University of Zanjan (AZU)
- Islamic Azad University, South Tehran Branch
- Persian Gulf University of Bushehr
- Shahid Bahonar Technical College of Shiraz
- Shahrood University of Technology, Faculty of Architectural Engineering and Urbanism
- Shiraz university, Faculty of Art and Architecture, Shiraz
- Shahid Chamran University of Ahvaz
- Shahid Rajaee University
- Tabriz Islamic Art University (TIAU), Faculty of Art & Architecture, Tabriz
- Tarbiat Modares University, Faculty of Art and Architecture, Department of Architecture, Tehran
- Technical and Vocational University
- University of Art, Faculty of Urbanism and Architecture, Department of Architecture
- University of Guilan, Architecture, Urbanism, Urban Design and Planning, Rasht
- University of Isfahan (Isfahan Art), Architecture, Urbanism, Urban Design and Planning
- University of Mazandaran, Faculty of Art and Architecture, Department of Architecture, Babolsar,
- University of Science and Culture (USC), Faculty of Art and Architecture
- University of Tehran, Faculty of Fine Arts, Department of Architecture, Tehran
- University of Urmia, Faculty of Art and Architecture, Department of Architecture
- Yazd University, Faculty of Art and Architecture, Yazd

=== Iraq ===
- Bayan University, Department of Architecture Engineering, Erbil, Kurdistan
- Cihan University, Department of Architecture Engineering, Erbil, Kurdistan
- Ishik University, Architecture Department, Erbil, Kurdistan
- Koya University, Department of Architectural Engineering, Koy Sanjaq, Kurdistan
- Nahrain University, Department of Architectural Engineering, Baghdad
- Nawroz University, Department of Architecture, Duhok, Kurdistan
- Salahaddin University, Architectural Engineering Department, Erbil, Kurdistan
- University of Babylon, College of Engineering, Babylon
- University of Baghdad, Architecture Engineering Department, Baghdad
- University of Basrah, Architectural Department, Basra
- University of Duhok, School of Engineering, Department of Architecture. Duhok, Kurdistan
- University of Mosul, Department of Architectural Engineering, Mosul
- University of Sulaymaniyah, Architectural Engineering, Sulaymaniyah, Kurdistan
- University of Technology, Department of Architectural Engineering, Baghdad
- University of Wasit, Architecture Engineering Department, Kut
- Uruk University College, Architectur Department, Baghdad

=== Israel ===
- Ariel University, School of Architecture, Ariel
- Bezalel Academy of Art and Design, Department of Architecture, Jerusalem
- Technion, Israel Institute of Technology, Faculty of Architecture and Town Planning, Haifa
- Tel Aviv University, Yolanda and David Katz Faculty of the Arts, David Azrieli School of Architecture, Tel Aviv
- Wizo School of design, The Neri Bloomfield School of Design and Education, Haifa

=== Japan ===
Universities and junior colleges in Japan with a Department of Architecture.

==== National universities ====
- Chiba University Faculty of Urban Environmental Systems, Department of Environmental Planning, Department of Architecture
- Hiroshima University Faculty of Engineering, Department of Architecture(Program of the four species)
- Hokkaido University Faculty of Engineering, Department of Environmental and Social System Architecture
- Kagoshima University Faculty of Engineering, Department of Architecture
- Kobe University Faculty of Engineering, Department of Architecture
- Kumamoto University Faculty of Engineering, Department of Architecture
- Kyoto Institute of Technology, Science part craft engineering modeling region, Kyoto
- Kyoto University, Faculty of Engineering, Department of Architecture and Architectural Systems, Kyoto
- Kyushu Institute of Technology Faculty of Engineering, Department of Social architecture construction course
- Kyushu University Faculty of Engineering, Department of Architecture / Faculty of Arts (formerly Kyushu Institute of Design), Department of Environmental Design
- Mie University Faculty of Engineering, Department of Architecture
- Muroran Institute of Technology Faculty of Engineering, Department of Systems Engineering construction, Division of Architecture
- Nagasaki University Faculty of Engineering Department of the structure
- Nagoya Institute of Technology Faculty of Engineering, Architecture & Design Department
- Nagoya University Faculty of Engineering, Department of Social and Environmental Studies Course Architecture
- Nara Women's University Faculty of Environmental Studies life living environment, Department of Housing course
- National University Corporation Tsukuba University of Technology Department of Architecture hearing section
- Niigata University Faculty of Engineering Department of Construction of Architecture
- Oita University Faculty of Engineering, Department of Environmental Engineering course architecture welfare
- Osaka University Faculty of Engineering, Architectural Engineering and Environmental Engineering, Department of General In addition to Earth
- Saga University Faculty of Science and Technology of Urban Engineering, Graduate School of Architecture and Urban Design Course
- Shimane University Faculty of General Science and Technology Department of Materials and Process
- Shinshu University Faculty of Engineering, Department of Architecture
- Tohoku University Faculty of Engineering, Department of Architecture Sendai
- Tokyo Institute of Technology (TokyoTech), Faculty of Engineering, Department of Architecture Tokyo
- Tokyo National University of Fine Arts Faculty of Fine Arts Department of Architecture
- Toyohashi University of Technology Faculty of Engineering Department of Construction
- University of Fukui, Faculty of Engineering, Department of Building & Construction
- University of the Ryukyus Faculty of Engineering, Department of Architecture course construction environment
- University of Tsukuba Science and Technology group (or social engineering <Urban Planning> College of Engineering Systems <Engineering Environment and Development>), main major design group specializing in art school <architectural design, environmental design>
- University of Tokyo, Faculty of Engineering, Department of Architecture, Department of Urban Engineering Tokyo
- University of Toyama Faculty of Arts and Culture, Department of Arts and Design building science course
- Utsunomiya University Faculty of Engineering Department of Construction of Architecture course
- Wakayama University Faculty of Systems Engineering, Department of Environmental Systems
- Yamaguchi University Faculty of Engineering, Department of Kansei Engineering Design Course of the human space
- Yokohama National University Faculty of Engineering, Department of Construction of Architecture

==== Public universities ====
- Akita Municipal Junior College of Arts and Crafts Department of Industrial Design
- Akita Prefectural University Faculty of Systems Science and Technology Department of Architecture and Environment Systems
- Gifu City Women's College Interior Design Course, Department of Kansei architecture design vocational life design
- Iwate Prefectural University College of Life Science, Department of Life Science
- Kanazawa College of Art Faculty of Arts and Crafts Design Department of Environmental Design course
- Kyoto Prefectural University Faculty of Life and Environmental Department of Environmental Design, Landscape Design, Architecture, Living Environment course and life course
- Maebashi Institute of Technology Faculty of Engineering, Department of Architecture (Day), Department of Integrated Design (Night)
- Miyagi University Faculty of Project, Department of Design and Information Design, Course of Space Design
- Nagoya City University Faculty of Arts and city Department of Environmental Design
- Okayama Prefectural University School of Design Department of Design
- Osaka City University Faculty of Engineering, Department of Architecture, Environmental Urban Engineering, Graduate School, Life Sciences Division, Department of the living environment
- Prefectural University of Kumamoto, Faculty of Symbiotic Science Course, Department of Environmental Symbiosis residential environment
- Sapporo City University Faculty of Design Department of Design, Space Design Course
- Tokyo Metropolitan University Faculty of Urban Environment, Department of Architecture and Urban urban environment course
- University of Hyogo (Hyogo Prefectural University) Faculty of Human Environment Department of the human environment (course plan living space and conservation course creative living environment course environmental analysis)
- University of Kitakyushu Faculty of International Environmental Engineering, Department of Environmental Space Design Kitakyushu
- The University of Shiga Prefecture Environmental Sciences Department of Environmental Design, Department of

==== Private universities ====
===== Hokkaido and Tohoku =====
- Dohto University Faculty of Fine Arts Department of Architecture
- Hachinohe Institute of Technology Faculty of Engineering, Department of Architectural Engineering, Faculty of Design, Department of ansei Design, Course of Housing design sensibility
- Hokkai Gakuen University Faculty of Engineering, Department of Architecture
- Hokkaido Institute of Technology Faculty of creation space architecture department (from 2008)
- Koriyama Women's University Faculty of Human Sciences and Design, Department of Human Life
- Tohoku Bunka Gakuen University Faculty of Science and Technology (living from Department of Environmental Planning Department of Environmental Design, human, 2008 Department of Environmental Design )
- Tohoku Institute of Technology Faculty of Engineering, Department of Architecture
- Tohoku University of Art and Design Faculty of Engineering and Design, Department of Environmental Design
- Tokai University (Asahikawa Campus, formerly Hokkaido Tokai University), Faculty of Engineering, Department of Architecture and Environment Design, Arts course architecture Town Planning course, Sapporo

===== Kanto =====
- Ashikaga Institute of Technology Faculty of Engineering, Department of Architecture
- Bunka Women's University Faculty of Art, Department of Housing Architectural Design Course
- Chiba Institute of Technology Faculty of Engineering, Department of Architecture and Urban Environment
- Hosei University Faculty of Engineering, Department of Architecture
- Institute of Technologists (Monotsukuri University) Faculty of craft skill, Department of Construction course cities and architecture course architecture and interior design course wooden building finishing course
- Japan Women's University Faculty of Human Sciences and Design dwelling Department of Architecture and Environment Design Course
- Jissen Women's University Faculty of living environment architecture design course
- Kanagawa University Faculty of Engineering, Department of Architecture
- Kanto Gakuin University Faculty of Engineering, Department of Architecture/Faculty of Human Environment Department of Environmental Design
- Keio University Faculty of Science and Technology System Design Engineering (Hiyoshi Campus) and the Faculty of Environmental Information, Department of Information Design (Shonan-Fujisawa Campus)
- Kogakuin University
  - Faculty of Architecture, Town Planning Department (established in April 2011), Department of Architecture, Department of Architecture and Design: restructuring and reorganization to "Faculty of Architecture" in April 2011, Faculty of Engineering, Department of Architecture, Part 1, Department of Architecture and Urban Design
  - Faculty of Engineering, Department of Architecture Part 2 (night)
- Kokushikan University Faculty of Architecture Department of Design from the Faculty of Science and Technology Department of Science and Engineering, architectural changes to the system
- Komazawa Women's University Faculty of Humanities, Department of molding space
- Kyoei Gakuen Junior College Department of Housing
- Kyoritsu Women's University Faculty of Human Sciences and Design Department of Architecture and Design
- Meiji University Faculty of Science and Technology Department of Architecture
- Meikai University Faculty of Real Estate, Department of Real Estate, Environmental Design Course
- Meisei University Faculty of Science and Technology Department of Architecture
- Musashino Art University Faculty of Art, Department of Architecture
- Musashino University Faculty of Environmental Studies, Department of Environment Living Environment course
- Nihon University
  - College of Bioresource Science, Department of Biological and Environmental (Fujisawa Campus, Kanagawa)
  - College of Engineering, Department of Architecture (Koriyama Campus, Fukushima)
  - College of Fine Arts, Department of Design, Architecture Design Course (Ecoda Campus, Tokyo)
  - College of Production Engineering, Department of Architecture (Mimomi Campus, Chiba)
  - College of Science and Technology, School of Architecture, School of Marine Engineering Building (Tokyo Surugadai Campus and Chiba Funabashi Campus)
  - Junior College Department of Design, Architecture and life (Funabashi Campus, Chiba)
- Nippon Institute of Technology Faculty of Engineering, Department of Architecture
- Shibaura Institute of Technology Faculty of Engineering, Department of Architecture, Department of Architectural Engineering (Mita Campus, Tokyo) Faculty of Systems Engineering, Department of Environmental Systems (Saitama Campus)
- Showa Women's University Faculty of Life Sciences Division, Department of Architecture course living environment, the design area, Department of Interior Architecture and Design, college of cultural creation
- Tama Art University Faculty of Art, Department of Environmental Design Department of Design, Space Design, Faculty of plastic expression field
- Tokai University Faculty of Engineering, Department of Architecture, Faculty of Engineering and Design Department of Architecture and Design
- Tokyo City University (formerly Musashi Institute of Technology), Faculty of Engineering, Department of Architecture
- Tokyo Denki University Faculty of Future Science, Department of Architecture
- Tokyo Polytechnic University Faculty of Engineering, Department of Architecture
- Tokyo University of Science Faculty of Engineering, Department of Architecture, Part 1, Faculty of Engineering, Department of Architecture, Part 2 (Iidabashi Campus, Tokyo), Faculty of Science and Technology Department of Architecture (Noda Campus, Chiba)
- Tokyo Zokei University (Tokyo University of Art and Design) Faculty of Art and Design, Department of Interior Design, interior architecture major area
- Toyo University Faculty of Engineering, Department of Architecture/Faculty of Life human Design, Department of Environmental Design
- Waseda University School of Creative Science and Technology, Department of Architecture

===== Chubu =====
- Aichi Institute of Technology Faculty of Engineering Course of the Department of Architecture, Urban and Environmental Studies Course of Architecture and Environment
- Aichi Konan College Department of Life Science, interior and architecture course
- Aichi Sangyo University Art School Department of Architecture, Department of Architecture in Ministry of Education and Communication
- Aichi Shukutoku University Faculty of Contemporary Social Studies, Department of Urban and Environmental Design, Course of modern society
- Chubu University Faculty of Engineering, Department of Architecture
- Daido University Faculty of Engineering, Department of Architecture
- Fukui University of Technology Faculty of Engineering, Department of Building Construction
- Gifu Women's University Faculty of Human Sciences and Design Department of Life Sciences
- Kanazawa Institute of Technology Faculty of Architecture Building and Environment, Department of Architecture and Urban Design
- Meijo University Faculty of Science and Technology, Department of Architecture
- Nagaoka Institute Of Design Faculty of Art, Department of Architecture and Environmental Design
- Nagoya Zokei University (Nagoya University of Art and Design) Art College, Department of Design, Architecture and Design Course space
- Niigata Institute of Technology Faculty of Engineering, Department of Architecture
- Shizuoka University of Art and Culture School of Design, Department of molding space
- Sugiyama Jogakuen University life science unit Department of living and Environmental Design

===== Kinki =====
- BAIKA Women's University Faculty of Modern Human Living, Environment Department
- Kansai University Faculty of Urban and Environmental Engineering, Department of Architecture
- Kinki University
  - Faculty of Architecture Department of Architecture (established in April 2011: restructuring and reorganization to Faculty of Architecture in April 2011, Faculty of Science and Technology Department of Architecture)
  - Faculty of Engineering, Department of Architecture
  - Industrial Science and Technology Department of Architecture and Design (Kyushu Campus)
  - Literary department seminar and spatial design: Architecture, Department of Art and Design course
- Kio University Faculty of Health Sciences Department of healthy living human environmental design course
- Kobe Design University School of Design, Department of Architecture & Environmental
- Kwansei Gakuin University Faculty of Policy Management, urban policy field
- Kyoto Seika University, Faculty of Design, Department of Architecture, Kyoto
- Kyoto Tachibana University Faculty of Modern Business, Department of Urban Design, Tourism and Urban design course Interior and Architecture course,
- Kyoto University of the Arts Faculty of Arts, Department of Environmental Design, Architecture Design Course/Ministry of Education Department of Design, Architecture Design Course
- Kyoto Women's University Faculty of Human Sciences and Design, Department of formative life
- Mukogawa Women's University Faculty of living environment, Department of Architecture
- Osaka Institute of Technology Faculty of Engineering, Department of Architecture, Department of Space Design
- Osaka Sangyo University Faculty of Engineering, Department of Environmental Design, Architecture, from the Department of Environmental Design (renamed in April 2008) living environment from the Department of Urban and Environmental Department, Faculty of Human Environment (renamed in April 2008)
- Osaka Shoin Women's University College of liberal arts, Department of Interior Design
- Osaka University of Arts Faculty of Arts, Department of Architecture
- Osaka University of Human Sciences Faculty of Human Sciences, Department of Environment and Architectural Design
- Otemae Junior College Department of Housing Comprehensive System Design Life
- Ritsumeikan University Faculty of Science and Technology Urban Systems Engineering, Department of Architecture and Urban Design
- Setsunan University Faculty of Science and Technology, Department of Architecture
- Takarazuka University of Art and Design School of Art, Department of Industrial Design, Architectural Design Course and Interior Design Course
- Tezukayama University Faculty of Modern Life Design, Department of Dwelling Space

===== Chugoku, Shikoku and Kyushu =====
- Daiichi Institute of Technology (first technical university) Faculty of Engineering, Department of Architecture
- Fukuoka University Faculty of Engineering, Department of Architecture
- Fukuyama University Faculty of Engineering, Department of Architecture
- Hiroshima Jogakuin University Life Sciences Faculty, Department of Design and living information
- Hiroshima Institute of Technology Faculty of Engineering, Department of Architecture, Faculty of Environmental Studies Department of Environmental Design
- Hiroshima International University Faculty of Design, Department of Housing (Social and Environmental Sciences)
- Kawasaki University of Medical Welfare Faculty of Management, Department of Design, Health and Welfare
- Kochi University of Technology Faculty of Social Systems Engineering
- Kurume Institute of Technology Faculty of Engineering, Department of Building Facilities
- Kwassui Women's College Faculty of Life Healthy Life, Department of Design
- Kyushu Kyoritsu University Faculty of Engineering, Department of Architecture
- Kyushu Sangyo University Faculty of Engineering, Department of Architecture, Department of housing and interior design
- Kyushu Women's University Faculty of Human Sciences and Design, Department of Human Life
- Matsuyama Shinonome Junior College Department of Life Sciences School of Life Design
- Mimasaka University of Life Sciences Faculty, Welfare, Department of Environmental Design course architecture welfare
- Nagasaki Institute of Applied Science Faculty of Engineering, Department of Architecture
- Nippon Bunri University Faculty of Engineering, Department of Architecture and Design
- Nishinippon Institute of Technology School of Design, Department of Architecture
- Okayama University of Science Faculty of Information Technology, Department of Architecture
- Sojo University Faculty of Engineering, Department of Architecture
- Tohwa University Faculty of Environmental Design Engineering course architectural, interior design of residential
- Tokai University (Kumamoto Campus, formerly Kyushu Tokai University), School of Industrial Engineering, Department of Architecture
- Tokushima Bunri University Faculty of Human Life, Department of Housing
- Tottori University of Environmental Studies Faculty of Environmental Information, Department of Environmental Design
- Yasuda Women's University Faculty of Human Sciences and Design, Department of life Design

=== Jordan ===
- Jordan University of Science and Technology, College of Architecture and Design, Ar Ramtha.
- University of Jordan, Department of Architecture, all programs of the school of engineering of The University of Jordan are available on this link, Amman.

=== Laos ===
- National University of Laos, Faculty of Architecture, Vientiane capital city
- Souphanouvong University, Faculty of Architecture, Luangprabang world heritage city

=== Lebanon ===
- American University of Beirut, Faculty of Architecture, Beirut
- Beirut Arab University, Faculty of Architecture, Debbieh
- Lebanese American University, Faculty of Architecture, Beirut
- Académie libanaise des Beaux-Arts, Faculty of Architecture
- Lebanese University, Institute des Beaux Arts, Department of Architecture
- Notre Dame University–Louaize, Faculty of Architecture, Louaize
- Université Saint-Esprit de Kaslik, Department of Architecture, Kaslik
- Université Saint-Joseph, Ecole d'Architecture, Beirut

=== Malaysia ===
- ALFA International College, School of Architecture, Subang Jaya, Selangor
- Infrastructure University Kuala Lumpur (IUKL), School of Architecture and Built Environment, Kajang
- International Islamic University of Malaysia Kulliyyah (Faculty) of Architecture and Environmental Design, Gombak, Selangor
- International University College of Technology Twintech, Faculty of Built Environment (FABE), Department of Architecture, Bandar Sri Damansara, Kuala Lumpur
- Limkokwing University, Faculty of Built Environment (FABE), Department of Architecture, Cyberjaya
- Linton University College, Department of Architecture, Mantin, Negeri Sembilan
- MARA University of Technology (UiTM), Faculty of Architecture, Planning and Surveying, Department of Architecture, Shah Alam, Selangor, Sri Iskandar, Perak
- National University of Malaysia (UKM), Faculty of Engineering & Built Environment, Department of Architecture, Bangi, Selangor
- Port Dickson Polytechnic, Architectural Unit, Department of Civil Engineering, Port Dickson, Negeri Sembilan
- Putra University, Malaysia (UPM), Faculty of Design and Architecture (FRSB), Serdang, Selangor
- Taylor's University, School of Architecture, Building and Design (SABD), Petaling Jaya
- Tunku Abdul Rahman University College (TARUC), Faculty of Engineering and Built Environment (FEBE), Kuala Lumpur
- University College Sedaya International (UCSI) Department of Architecture Cheras, Kuala Lumpur
- University of Malaya (UM), Faculty of the Built Environment (FBE), Kuala Lumpur
- University of Science, Malaysia (USM), School Of Housing, Building And Planning (HBP), Architecture Department. Minden, Penang
- Universiti Malaysia Kelantan (UMK), Faculty of Architecture and Ekistics (FAE), Bachok, Kelantan
- Universiti Teknologi Malaysia (UTM), Faculty of Built Environment (FAB), Department of Architecture, Skudai, Johor Bahru
- Universiti Tunku Abdul Rahman (UTAR), Lee Kong Chian Faculty of Engineering and Science (LKC FES), Department of Architecture & Sustainable Design, Sungai Long, Selangor
- Universiti Sains Islam Malaysia (USIM), Faculty of Engineering and Built Environment (FKAB), Department of Architecture, Nilai, Negeri Sembilan

=== Oman ===
- Caledonian College of Engineering
- Higher College of Technology
- Sultan Qaboos University

=== Pakistan ===
==== Khyber Pakhtunkhwa ====
- CECOS University of Information Technology and Emerging Sciences, Department of Architecture, Peshawar
- University of Engineering and Technology, Peshawar, Department of Architecture, Abbottabad

==== Punjab ====
- Beaconhouse National University Department of Architecture, School of Architecture and Design, Lahore
- COMSATS Institute of Information Technology (CIIT), Department of Architecture, Islamabad
- COMSATS Institute of Information Technology (CIIT), Department of Architecture, Lahore
- National College of Arts, Department of Architecture, Lahore
- National College of Arts, Department of Architecture, Rawalpindi
- National University of Sciences and Technology, School of Art, Design and Architecture, Islamabad
- University of Engineering and Technology, Lahore, Department of Architecture
- University of the Punjab, Department of Architecture, College Of Art and Design, Lahore
- University of South Asia, Department of Architecture (Accreditation on hold), Lahore
- University of Lahore, Department of Architecture, Lahore

==== Sindh ====
- Dawood University of Engineering and Technology, Department of Architecture, Karachi
- Indus Valley School of Art and Architecture, Department of Architecture, Karachi
- Mehran University of Engineering and Technology, Department of Architecture, Centre of Excellence in Art and Design (Accreditation on hold), Jamshoro
- Mehran University of Engineering and Technology, Department of Architecture, Jamshoro
- NED University of Engineering and Technology, Department of Architecture, Karachi
- University of Karachi, Architecture Program at Department of Visual Studies, Karachi

=== Philippines ===
==== Luzon ====
- Adamson University (AdU), College of Architecture
- Don Honorio Ventura Technological State University (DHVTSU), College of Engineering and Architecture, Bacolor, Pampanga
- Bulacan State University (BulSU), College of Architecture and Fine Arts, Malolos City
- Cebu Institute of Technology – University (CIT-U), College of Engineering and Architecture, Cebu City
- Central Colleges of the Philippines (CCP), College of Architecture
- De La Salle–College of Saint Benilde (DLS-CSB), College of Architecture
- De La Salle University–Dasmariñas (DLSU-D), College of Engineering Architecture and Technology, Dasmariñas
- Eulogio "Amang" Rodriguez Institute of Science and Technology (EARIST), College of Architecture and Fine Arts
- Far Eastern University (FEU), Institute of Architecture and Fine Arts (IARFA)
- FEATI University, College of Architecture
- Manuel L. Quezon University (MLQU), School of Architecture
- Mapúa Institute of Technology (MIT), School of Architecture, Industrial Design and the Built Environment
- National University (NU), College of Architecture
- Nueva Ecija University of Science and Technology (NEUST), College of Architecture
- Pamantasan ng Lungsod ng Maynila (PLM), College of Architecture and Urban Planning
- Polytechnic University of the Philippines, College of Architecture and Fine Arts (PUP-CAFA)
- Rizal Technological University (RTU), College of Engineering and Industrial Technology
- Saint Louis University (SLU), Otto Hahn School of Engineering and Architecture, Baguio
- Technological Institute of the Philippines-Manila (TIP-Manila) and Quezon City (TIP-QC) College of Architecture and Engineering
- Technological University of the Philippines-Manila (TUP-Manila) College of Architecture and Fine Arts
- University of the Assumption (UA), College of Engineering and Architecture, City of San Fernando, Pampanga
- University of Baguio (UB), College of Engineering and Architecture, Baguio
- University of the Cordilleras (UC-BCF), College of Engineering and Architecture, Baguio
- University of Pangasinan (UPANG), College of Architecture, Dagupan
- University of the Philippines Diliman (UP-D), College of Architecture
- University of Saint Anthony (USANT), College of Engineering and Architecture and Technology, San Miguel, Iriga City
- University of Santo Tomas (UST), College of Architecture

==== Visayas and Mindanao ====
- La Consolacion College–Bacolod (LCCB), School of Architecture, Fine Arts and Interior Design, Bacolod
- Mindanao University of Science and Technology (MUST), College of Engineering and Architecture, Lapasan, Cagayan de Oro
- Silliman University (SU), College of Engineering and Design, Department of Architecture, Dumaguete
- University of Mindanao (UM), College of Architecture and Fine Arts, Davao City
- University of the Philippines Mindanao, UPMin, B.S. Architecture Program, Davao City
- University of San Agustin (USA), College of Engineering and Architecture, General Luna, Iloilo City
- University of San Carlos (USC), College of Architecture and Fine Arts, Cebu City
- Western Mindanao State University, College of Architecture, Zamboanga City
- Western Visayas College of Science and Technology, College of Engineering and Architecture, Iloilo City

=== Saudi Arabia ===
- King Abdulaziz University, Faculty of Environmental Design, Jeddah
- Effat University, Faculty of Architecture & Design, Jeddah College of Architecture & Design | Vision & Goals
- King Fahd University of Petroleum & Minerals, College of Environmental Design, Dhahran
- King Faisal University, College of Architecture and Planning, Dammam
- King Saud University, College of Architecture and Planning, Riyadh
- Qassim University, College of Architecture and Planning, Buraidah
- Umm al-Qura University, College of Engineering and Islamic Architecture, Makkah
- University of Dammam, College of Architecture and Planning, Dammam
- iLines Architecture, Makkah, Saudi Arabia.

=== Singapore ===
- National University of Singapore (NUS), School of Design and Environment (SDE), Department of Architecture
- Singapore University of Technology and Design (SUTD) Department of Architecture and Sustainable Design.

=== South Korea ===
- Ewha Womans University, [EA] Department of Architecture, ELTEC College of Engineering, Seoul
- Hanyang University, Department of Architecture, College of Architecture, Seoul
- Hongik University, Department of Architecture, College of Architecture, Seoul
- Konkuk University, Department of Architecture, College of Architecture, Seoul
- Konkuk University, [GSAKU] Graduate School of Architecture, Seoul
- Kookmin University, [SAKU] Department of Architecture, College of Architecture, Seoul
- Korea National University of Arts (K-ARTS), School of Visual Arts, Seoul
- Korea University (KU), Department of Architecture, Seoul
- Kyunghee University (KHU), Department of Architecture, Yongin
- Myongji University (MJU), College of Architecture, Yongin
- Seoul National University (SNU), Department of Architecture, Seoul
- Sungkyunkwan University (SKKU), Department of Architecture, Seoul
- University of Seoul, Department of Architecture, College of Urban Sciences, Seoul
- University of Ulsan (Ulsan Institute of Technology, UIT), School of Architecture, Ulsan
- Wonkwang University (WKU), Department of Architecture, Iksan
- Yonsei University (YU), Department of Architectural Engineering, Seoul

=== Sri Lanka ===
- City School of Architecture (CSA), Colombo
- University of Moratuwa (UoM), Faculty of Architecture, Department of Architecture, Moratuwa
- University of Kelaniya (UOK), Faculty of Architecture, Department of Architecture, Kelaniya

=== Taiwan ===
- Chinese Culture University, College of Environmental Design, Department of Architecture and Urban Design, Taipei
- Chung Hua University, College of Architecture and Planning, Department of Architecture and Urban Planning, Hsinchu
- Chung Yuan Christian University, College of Design, Department of Architecture, Zhongli
- Feng Chia University, School of Architecture, Taichung City
- Ming Chuan University, School of Design, Department of Architecture, Taipei
- National Cheng Kung University, College of Planning & Design, Department of Architecture, Tainan City
- National Chiao Tung University, College of Humanities and Social Sciences, Graduate Institute of Architecture, Hsinchu
- National Quemoy University, Department of Architecture, Kinmen County
- National Taiwan University of Science and Technology, Department of Architecture, Taipei City
- Tamkang University, College of Engineering, Department of Architecture, Danshui District, New Taipei City
- Tunghai University, Department of Architecture, Taichung City

=== Thailand ===
- Assumption University (AU), The International University in Thailand, School of Architecture, Suwannaphumi, Bangkok
- Bangkok University (BU), Faculty of Architecture, Pathum Thani
- Chiang Mai University (CMU), Faculty of Architecture, Chiang Mai
- Chulalongkorn University (CU), Faculty of Architecture, INDA (International Program in Design and Architecture) Bangkok
- Kasem Bundit University (KBU), Faculty of Architecture, Bangkok
- Kasetsart University (KU), Faculty of Architecture, Bang Khen, Bangkok
- Khon Kaen University (KKU), Faculty of Architecture, Khon Kaen
- King Mongkut's Institute of Technology Ladkrabang (KMITL), Faculty of Architecture, Department of Architecture, Lat Krabang, Bangkok
- King Mongkut's University of Technology Thonburi (KMUTT/Bangmod), School of Architecture and Design, Thung Khru, Bangkok
- Maejo University (MJU), Faculty of Architecture and Environmental Design, Sansai, Chiang Mai
- Mahasalakarm University (MSU), Faculty of Architecture Urban Design and Creative Arts, Mahasalakarm
- Rajamangala University of Technology Thanyaburi (RMUTT), Faculty of Architecture, Pathum Thani
- Rangsit University (RSU), Faculty of Architecture, Rangsit
- Silpakorn University (SU), Faculty of Architecture, Bangkok
- Sripatum University (SPU), Faculty of Architecture, Bangkok
- Thammasat University (TU), Faculty of Architecture and Planning, Pathum Thani

=== United Arab Emirates ===
- Abu Dhabi University, Department of Architecture and Design, College of Engineering and Computer Science, Abu Dhabi
- American University in Dubai, Department of Architecture
- Ajman University of Science and Technology, College of Architectural Engineering, Ajman
- American University of Sharjah, College of Architecture, art and Design, Sharjah
- Canadian University of Dubai, College of Architecture, Dubai
- United Arab Emirates University, Department of Architectural Engineering, Al Ain
- University of Sharjah, College of Architectural Engineering, Sharjah

=== Vietnam ===
- Hanoi Architectural University, Hanoi
- Ho Chi Minh City Architecture University, Ho Chi Minh City
- Hue University of Sciences, Faculty of Architecture, Huế
- National University of Civil Engineering, Faculty of Architecture and Urban Planning, Hanoi
- Van Lang University, Ho Chi Minh city
- Ton Duc Thang University, Faculty of Civil Engineering, Department Of Architecture, Ho Chi Minh City

== Europe ==
=== Albania ===
- Albanian University
- Epoka University, Department of Architecture
- International school of Architecture and Urban Policies, POLIS University
- Universiteti Politeknik i Tiranës, Departamenti i Arkitekturës dhe Urbanistikës

=== Austria ===
- Academy of Fine Arts Vienna, Architektur, Vienna
- University for Continuing Education Krems, Department for Building and Environment, Krems an der Donau
- Graz University of Technology (TU Graz), Faculty of Architecture, Graz
- University of Applied Arts Vienna, School of Architecture, Vienna
- University of Art and Design Linz, Department the architecture programme, Linz
- University of Innsbruck, Fakultät für Architektur, Innsbruck
- TU Wien, Fakultät für Architektur und Raumplanung, Vienna

=== Belgium ===
==== French Community of Belgium ====
The following is a list of French-speaking architectural schools in Belgium:

===== Architecture =====
- University of Louvain (UCLouvain)
  - Faculty of Architecture, Architectural Engineering and Urban Planning, Brussels, Tournai and Louvain-la-Neuve
  - School of Urbanism and Territorial Planning, Louvain School of Engineering, Louvain-la-Neuve
- University of Liège (ULiège)
  - Faculty of Architecture, Liège
  - Gembloux Agro-Bio Tech, Gembloux
- Université libre de Bruxelles (ULB), Faculty of Architecture, Ixelles
- University of Mons (UMons), Faculty of Architecture and Urban Planning, Mons
- Institut Saint-Luc, Higher Institute for Urbanism and Urban Renovation (ISURU), Brussels

===== Architectural engineering =====
- University of Louvain (UCLouvain)
  - Faculty of Architecture, Architectural Engineering and Urban Planning, Brussels, Tournai and Louvain-la-Neuve
  - Louvain School of Engineering, Louvain-la-Neuve
- University of Liège (ULiège), School of Engineering, Liège
- Université libre de Bruxelles (ULB), École polytechnique de Bruxelles, Brussels
- University of Mons (UMons), Faculty of Engineering, Mons

===== Interior architecture =====
- Saint-Luc Institutes Brussels, Saint-Luc Brussels School of Arts (ESA), Brussels
- Saint-Luc Liège School of Arts, Liège
- City of Liège School of Arts, Liège
- Arts^{2} School of Arts, Mons
- ENSAV La Cambre, Brussels
- Académie Royale des Beaux-Arts de la Ville de Bruxelles (ARBA-ESA), Brussels
- Académie Royale des Beaux-Arts de la Ville de Tournai, Tournai

==== Flemish community ====
The following is a list of Dutch-speaking architectural schools in Belgium:

===== Architecture =====
- University of Antwerp (UA), Faculty of Design Sciences, Antwerp
- Katholieke Universiteit te Leuven (KU Leuven), Faculty of Architecture, Schaerbeek and Ghent
- Hasselt University (UHasselt), Faculty of Architecture and Arts, Hasselt

==== Architectural engineering ====
- Ghent University (UGent), Faculty of Engineering and Architecture, Ghent
- Katholieke Universiteit te Leuven (KU Leuven), Faculty of Engineering Sciences, Leuven
- Vrije Universiteit Brussel (VUB), Faculty of Engineering, Ixelles

=== Bosnia and Herzegovina ===
- International University of Sarajevo, Faculty of Architecture and Social Science, Sarajevo
- University of Banja Luka, Faculty of Architecture and Civil Engineering, Banja Luka
- University of Sarajevo, Faculty of Architecture, Sarajevo

=== Bulgaria ===
- Higher School of Civil Engineering (VSU) "Lyben Karavelov", Sofia
- New Bulgarian University, Sofia
- University of Architecture, Civil Engineering and Geodesy, Sofia
- Varna Free University "Chernorizets Hrabar", Varna

=== Croatia ===
- University of Split, Faculty of Civil Engineering, Architecture and Geodesy, Split
- University of Zagreb, Faculty of Architecture, Zagreb

=== Cyprus ===
- Cyprus School of Architecture, Cyprus College of Art, Lemba.
- Eastern Mediterranean University, Faculty of Architecture, Famagusta
- Frederick University, School of Architecture, Fine and Applied Arts, Department of Architecture, Nicosia
- Neapolis University, School of Architecture and Environmental Sciences, Paphos
- University of Cyprus, School of Engineering, Department of Architecture, Nicosia
- University of Nicosia, School of Humanities, Social Science & Law, Department of Architecture, Nicosia

=== Czech Republic ===
- Academy of Arts, Architecture and Design, Department of architecture, Prague
- ARCHIP, Architectural Institute in Prague, Prague
- Brno University of Technology, Faculty of Architecture, Brno
- Czech Technical University in Prague, Faculty of Architecture, Prague
- Technical University of Liberec, Faculty of Architecture, Liberec

=== Denmark ===
- Aarhus School of Architecture, Aarhus
- Royal Danish Academy of Fine Arts

=== Estonia ===
- Estonian Academy of Arts, Tallinn

=== Finland ===
- Aalto University
- Tampere University of Technology
- University of Oulu, Department of Architecture, Oulu

=== France ===
Architecture schools in France are called ENSA: École nationale supérieure d'architecture.

- École d'architecture de la ville et des territoires à Marne-la-Vallée, Champs-sur-Marne
- École de Chaillot, La cité de l'architecture et du patrimoine, Palais de Chaillot, Paris
- École nationale supérieure d'architecture de Clermont-Ferrand, Clermont-Ferrand
- École nationale supérieure d'architecture de Grenoble, Grenoble
- École nationale supérieure d'architecture de Lyon, Lyon
- École nationale supérieure d'architecture de Marseille-Luminy, Marseille
- École nationale supérieure d'architecture de Montpellier, Montpellier
- École nationale supérieure d'architecture de Nancy, Nancy
- École nationale supérieure d'architecture de Nantes, Nantes
- École nationale supérieure d'architecture de Normandie, Rouen
- École nationale supérieure d'architecture de Paris-Belleville, Paris
- École nationale supérieure d'architecture de Paris-La Villette (ENSAPLV), Paris
- École nationale supérieure d'architecture de Paris-Malaquais, Paris
- École nationale supérieure d'architecture de Paris-Val de Seine, Paris
- École nationale supérieure d'architecture de Rennes Rennes, Brittany
- École nationale supérieure d'architecture de Saint-Étienne, Saint-Étienne
- École nationale supérieure d'architecture de Strasbourg, Strasbourg
- École nationale supérieure d'architecture de Toulouse, Toulouse
- École nationale supérieure d'architecture de Versailles, Versailles
- École nationale supérieure d'architecture et de paysage de Bordeaux, Bordeaux
- École nationale supérieure d'architecture et de paysage de Lille, Lille
- École nationale supérieure des arts et industries de Strasbourg, INSA de Strasbourg, Strasbourg
- École spéciale d'architecture (ESA), Paris
- Institut national des sciences appliquées de Strasbourg, Strasbourg
- Confluence Institute for Innovation and Creative Strategies in Architecture, Paris
- Paris School of Architecture (PSA), Paris

=== Germany ===
Architecture schools in Germany can be part of art academies, technical universities or universities of applied sciences.

=== Greece ===
- Aristotle University of Thessaloniki, Faculty of Engineering, School of Architecture, Thessaloniki
- Democritus University of Thrace, Faculty of Engineering, Department of Architectural Engineering, Xanthi
- National Technical University of Athens (Εθνικό Μετσόβιο Πολυτεχνείο), School of Architecture, Athens
- Technical University of Crete, Department of Architecture, Chania
- University of Patras, School of Engineering, Department of Architecture, Patras
- University of Thessaly, School of Engineering, Department of Architecture, Volos
- University of Ioannina, School of Engineering, Department of Architecture, Ioannina

=== Hungary ===
- Budapest University of Technology and Economics, Faculty of Architecture, Budapest
- Moholy-Nagy University of Art and Design, Faculty of Architecture, Budapest
- Nyugat-Magyarországi Egyetem, Faipari Mérnöki Kar, Sopron
- Széchenyi István University, Faculty of Architectural Design, Győr
- Szent István University, Ybl Miklós Faculty of Architecture and Civil Engineering, Budapest
- University of Debrecen, Faculty of Technology, Debrecen
- University of Pécs, Pollack Mihály Faculty of Technology, Pécs

=== Iceland ===
- Iceland Academy of Arts, Department of Design & Architecture, Reykjavík

=== Ireland ===
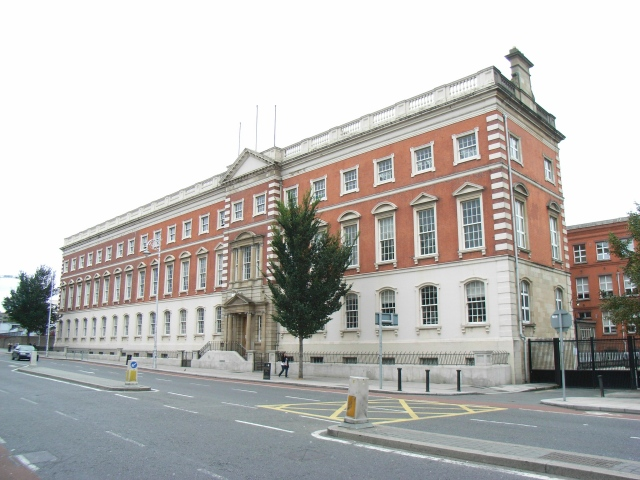
Technological University Dublin, Bolton Street

City	University	Faculty	Department	Year founded	CAO Admission Points (2022)	Portfolio Reqd.	Accreditation/Validation/Certification	Duration (Years)	Award	Website
Cork	Munster Technological University/University College Cork	Science, Engineering and Food Science	Cork Centre for Architectural Education	2006	544	No	RIAI	4 + 1 (5)	BSc.Arch + M.Arch	
Dublin	Technological University Dublin	Engineering and Built Environment	School of Architecture, Building and Environment	1942	645 (inclusive of maximum 200 allocated during exam and interview)	Yes (during interview)	RIAI	5 or 4 + 1½ (5 or 5½) and 1 part-time	B.Arch or BSc. Arch + M.Arch and Professional Diploma	
Dublin	University College Dublin	Engineering and Architecture	School of Architecture, Planning and Environmental Policy	1911	556	No	RIAI / RIBA / NAAB	3 + 2 (5) and 1 part-time	BSc.Arch + M.Arch and Professional Diploma	
Limerick	University of Limerick	Science and Engineering	SAUL	2005	532	No (currently suspended)	RIAI	5	B.Arch	
Sligo	Atlantic Technological University	Engineering and Design	Yeats Academy of Arts, Design & Architecture	2018	420	No	candidate status accreditation from RIAI upon first cohort graduating in 2023	5	B.Arch	
Waterford	South East Technological University	Engineering	Department of Architecture	2007	374	No	RIAI (MArch candidate status accreditation from RIAI upon first cohort graduating in 2023)	3 + 2 (5)	BSc.Arch + B.Arch or BSc. Arch + M.Arch	

==== Architecture Schools in Northern Ireland (United Kingdom) ====
- Queen's University Belfast, School of Natural and Built Environment, Belfast,
- Ulster University, Belfast School of Architecture, Belfast

=== Italy ===
City	University	Faculty	Year founded	Website
Alghero	University of Sassari	Architecture	1562	
Ancona	Marche Polytechnic University	Engineering	1959	
Bari	Politecnico di Bari	Architecture	1990	
Bologna	Università di Bologna	Architecture Aldo Rossi	1088	
Brescia	University of Brescia	Engineering	1950	
Cagliari	University of Cagliari	Architecture	1606	
Camerino	University of Camerino	Architecture	1727	
Enna	Kore University of Enna	Architecture	1995	
Ferrara	Università di Ferrara	Architecture	1391	
Florence	University of Florence	Architecture	1321	
Genoa	University of Genoa	Architecture	1481	
L'Aquila	University of L'Aquila	Engineering	1964	
Milan	Politecnico di Milano	Architecture	1863	
Naples	University of Naples Federico II	Architecture	1224	
Naples	Second University of Naples	Architecture	1991	
Padua	University of Padua	Engineering	1222	
Palermo	University of Palermo	Architecture	1806	
Parma	University of Parma	Architecture	1502	
Pavia	University of Pavia	Engineering	1361	
Pescara	D'Annunzio University of Chieti–Pescara	Architecture	1960	
Pisa	University of Pisa	Engineering	1343	
Potenza	Basilicata University	Architecture	1982	
Reggio Calabria	University of Reggio Calabria	Architecture	1968	
Rende	University of Calabria	Engineering	1972	
Rome	Sapienza University of Rome	Architecture	1303	
Rome	University of Rome Tor Vergata	Engineering	1982	
Rome	Università degli Studi Roma Tre	Architecture	1992	
Salerno	University of Salerno	Engineering	1968	
Syracuse	University of Catania	Architecture	1434	
Trento	University of Trento	Engineering	1962	
Trieste	University of Trieste	Architecture	1924	
Turin	Politecnico di Torino	Architecture 1 & 2	1859	
Udine	University of Udine	Engineering	1978	
Venice	Università Iuav di Venezia	Architecture	1926	

=== Latvia ===
- Riga Technical University
- Rigas International School of Economics and Business Administration

=== Lithuania ===
- Kaunas University of Technology
- Vilnius Academy of Arts
- Vilnius Gediminas Technical University

=== Moldova ===
- Technical University of Moldova, Urbanism and Architecture Faculty; Technical University Of Moldova - Universitatea Tehnică A Moldovei

=== Netherlands ===
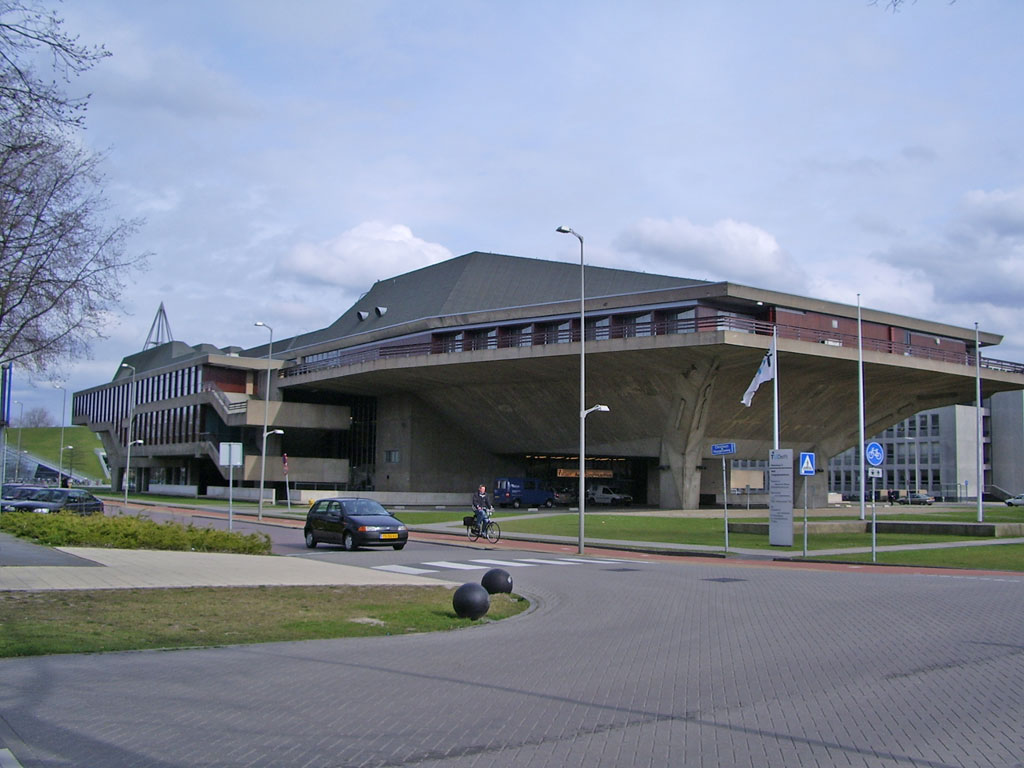
TU Delft, Netherlands

- Amsterdam School of the Arts, Amsterdam Academy of Architecture, Amsterdam
- ArtEZ, Arnhem Academy of Architecture, Arnhem
- Berlage Institute, Postgraduate Laboratory of Architecture, Rotterdam
- Delft University of Technology, Faculty of Architecture, Delft
- Eindhoven University of Technology, Department of Architecture, Building and Planning, Eindhoven
- Maastricht University, Faculty of Humanities & Sciences, Department of Architecture, Maastricht
- The Rotterdam Academy of Architecture and Urban Design, Rotterdam

=== North Macedonia ===
- The Ss. Cyril and Methodius University, Faculty of Architecture
- State University of Tetovo, Applied Sciences Faculty
- University American College Skopje, Faculty of Architecture and Design

=== Norway ===
Godkjente arkitektskoler:

- Bergen School of Architecture, Bergen
- Norwegian University of Science and Technology Faculty of Architecture and Fine Art, Trondheim
- Oslo School of Architecture and Design, Oslo

=== Poland ===
- Andrzej Frycz Modrzewski Krakow University (Krakowska Akademia im. Andrzeja Frycza Modrzewskiego), Faculty of Architecture and Fine Arts, Kraków
- Białystok Technical University (Politechnika Białostocka), Faculty of Architecture, Białystok
- Gdańsk University of Technology (Politechnika Gdańska), Faculty of Architecture, Gdańsk
- Kielce University of Technology (Politechnika Świętokrzyska), Faculty of Architecture and Town Planning, Kielce
- Lublin University of Technology (Politechnika Lubelska), Faculty of Architecture, Lublin
- Poznań University of Technology (Politechnika Poznańska), Faculty of Architecture, Poznań
- Silesian University of Technology (Politechnika Śląska), Faculty of Architecture, Gliwice
- Tadeusz Kościuszko University of Technology (Politechnika Krakowska), Kraków
- Technical University of Łódź, Faculty of Civil Engineering, Architecture and Environmental Engineering, Łódź
- University of Arts in Poznań (Uniwersytet Artystyczny w Poznaniu), Faculty of Architecture and Design, Poznań
- University of Economy Bydgoszcz (Wyższa Szkoła Gospodarki (WSG)), Architecture und Town Planning, Bydgoszcz
- Warsaw University of Technology (Politechnika Warszawska), Faculty of Architecture, Warsaw
- West Pomeranian University of Technology (Zachodniopomorski Uniwersytet Technologiczny), Faculty of Civil Engineering and Architecture, Szczecin
- Wroclaw University of Technology (Politechnika Wrocławska), Faculty of Architecture, Wrocław

=== Portugal ===
- Escola de Arquitectura da Universidade do Minho
- Escola Superior Artística do Porto, Arquitectura, Porto
- Escola Superior Gallaecia (ESG), Arquitectura, Vila Nova de Cerveira
- Escola Universitária das Artes de Coimbra
- Instituto Superior de Ciências do Trabalho e da Empresa (ISCTE), Department of Architecture, Lisbon
- Lusíada University of Porto (ULP), Faculty of Architecture and Arts (FAAULP), Porto
- Technical University of Lisbon (UTL), Instituto Superior Técnico (IST), Department of Civil Engineering and Architecture, Lisbon
- Universidade Autónoma de Lisboa Luís de Camões
- Universidade da Beira Interior (UBI), Arquitectura Covilhã
- Universidade Lusíada de Lisboa, School of Architecture and Arts, Lisbon
- Universidade Lusófona de Humanidades e Tecnologias
- University of Coimbra (UC), Faculty of Sciences and Technology (FCTUC), Department of Architecture, Coimbra
- University of Évora (UE), Department of Architecture, Évora
- University of Porto (UP), Faculty of Architecture (FAUP), Porto
- Technical University of Lisbon (UTL), Faculty of Architecture (FA), Lisbon
- Porto Academy Porto Academy

=== Romania ===
- Ion Mincu University of Architecture and Urbanism, Bucharest
- University of Oradea, Facultatea de Architectură şi Construcţii, Oradea
- Polytechnic University of Timișoara, Facultatea de Arhitectură, Timișoara
- Spiru Haret University, Facultatea de Arhitectură, Bucharest
- Universitatea Tehnică Cluj-Napoca, Facultatea de Arhitectură, Cluj-Napoca
- Universitatea Tehnică "Gheorghe Asachi", Facultatea de Arhitectură, Iaşi

=== Russia ===
- Institute of Architecture & Art, Rostov-on-Don
- MArchI, Moscow Architectural Institute – State Academy
- Moscow Architecture School MARCH
- Moscow State University of Civil Engineering – Institute of Construction and Architecture, Moscow
- Novosibirsk State University of Architecture, Design and Arts
- Pacific National University, Faculty of Architecture & Design, Khabarovsk
- Russian Academy of Arts, Department of Architecture
- Saint-Petersburg State University of Architecture and Civil Engineering, Saint-Petersburg
- State University of Land Use Planning, Faculty of Architecture
- Tomsk State University of Architecture and Building, Tomsk
- USAAA, Ural State Academy of Architecture and Arts, Ekaterinburg
- Vologda State Technical University, Department of Architecture and Urban Design, Vologda

=== Serbia ===
- State University of Novi Pazar, Faculty of Technical Sciences, Novi Pazar
- University of Belgrade, Faculty of Architecture, Belgrade
- University of Niš, Faculty of Civil Engineering and Architecture, Niš
- University of Novi Sad, Faculty of Technical Sciences, Novi Sad
- University of Prišina, Faculty of Technical Sciences, Kosovska Mitrovica

=== Slovakia ===
- Academy of Fine Arts and Design in Bratislava, Department of Architecture, Bratislava
- Slovak University of Technology in Bratislava, Faculty of Architecture, Bratislava
- Technical University of Košice, Faculty of Arts, Košice

=== Slovenia ===
- University of Ljubljana, Faculty of Architecture, Ljubljana
- University of Maribor, Faculty of Civil Engineering (Department of Architecture), Maribor

=== Spain ===
Architecture schools in Spain are called ETSA: "Escuela Técnica Superior de Arquitectura" in Spanish, or "Escola Tècnica Superior d'Arquitectura" in Catalan.

Andalucía;

- International School of Metaphoric Architecture, Málaga
- Escuela Técnica Superior de Arquitectura de la Universidad de Granada, Granada
- Escuela Técnica Superior de Arquitectura de la Universidad de Málaga, Málaga
- Escuela Técnica Superior de Arquitectura de la Universidad de Sevilla, Sevilla

Castilla–La Mancha;

- Escuela de Arquitectura de la Universidad de Castilla–La Mancha, Toledo

Castilla y León;

- Escuela Técnica Superior de Arquitectura de la Universidad de Valladolid, Valladolid
- Escuela Técnica Superior de Arquitectura de la Universidad IE (Segovia)

Catalunya;

- Barcelona Institute of Architecture (BIArch)
- Escola Tècnica Superior d'Arquitectura de Barcelona de la Universitat Politècnica de Catalunya, Barcelona
- Escola Tècnica Superior d'Arquitectura de la Universitat de Girona, Girona
- Escola Tècnica Superior d'Arquitectura de la Universitat Internacional de Catalunya, Barcelona
- Escola Tècnica Superior d'Arquitectura de la Universitat Ramon Llull – La Salle, Barcelona
- Escola Tècnica Superior d'Arquitectura de la Universitat Rovira i Virgili, Reus
- Escola Tècnica Superior d'Arquitectura del Vallès de la Universitat Politècnica de Catalunya, Sant Cugat del Vallès
- Institute for Advanced Architecture of Catalonia, Barcelona
- Metropolis Master in Architecture and Urban Culture (Universitat Politècnica de Catalunya/Centre de Cultura Contemporània de Barcelona)

Galicia;

- Escola Técnica Superior de Arquitectura da Coruña, A Coruña

Las Palmas de Gran Canaria;

- Escuela Técnica Superior de Arquitectura de la Universidad de Las Palmas de Gran Canaria, Gran Canaria

Madrid;

- Escuela Técnica Superior de Arquitectura de la Universidad Alfonso X, Madrid
- Escuela Técnica Superior de Arquitectura de la Universidad Camilo José Cela, Madrid
- Escuela Técnica Superior de Arquitectura de la Universidad CEU San Pablo, Madrid
- Escuela Técnica Superior de Arquitectura de la Universidad de Alcalá, Madrid
- Escuela Técnica Superior de Arquitectura de la Universidad Europea de Madrid, Madrid
- Escuela Técnica Superior de Arquitectura de la Universidad Francisco de Vitoria, Madrid
- Escuela Técnica Superior de Arquitectura de la Universidad IE, Madrid/Segovia
- Escuela Técnica Superior de Arquitectura de la Universidad Pontificia de Salamanca, Madrid
- Escuela Técnica Superior de Arquitectura de Madrid

Navarra;

- Escuela Técnica Superior de Arquitectura de la Universidad de Navarra, Pamplona

País Vasco;

- Escuela Técnica Superior de Arquitectura de la Universidad del País Vasco, San Sebastián

Valencia;

- Escuela Superior de Enseñanzas Técnicas, Arquitectura, Universidad CEU Cardenal Herrera
- Polytechnic University of Valencia (UPV), School of Architecture (ETSAV), Valencia
- University of Alicante, Department of Architectural Constructions, Alicante

=== Sweden ===
- Chalmers University of Technology, Department of Architecture and Civil Engineering, Gothenburg
- Lund University, Department of Architecture, Lund
- KTH Royal Institute of Technology, School of Architecture and Built Environment, Stockholm
- Umeå School of Architecture (UMA), Umeå

=== Switzerland ===
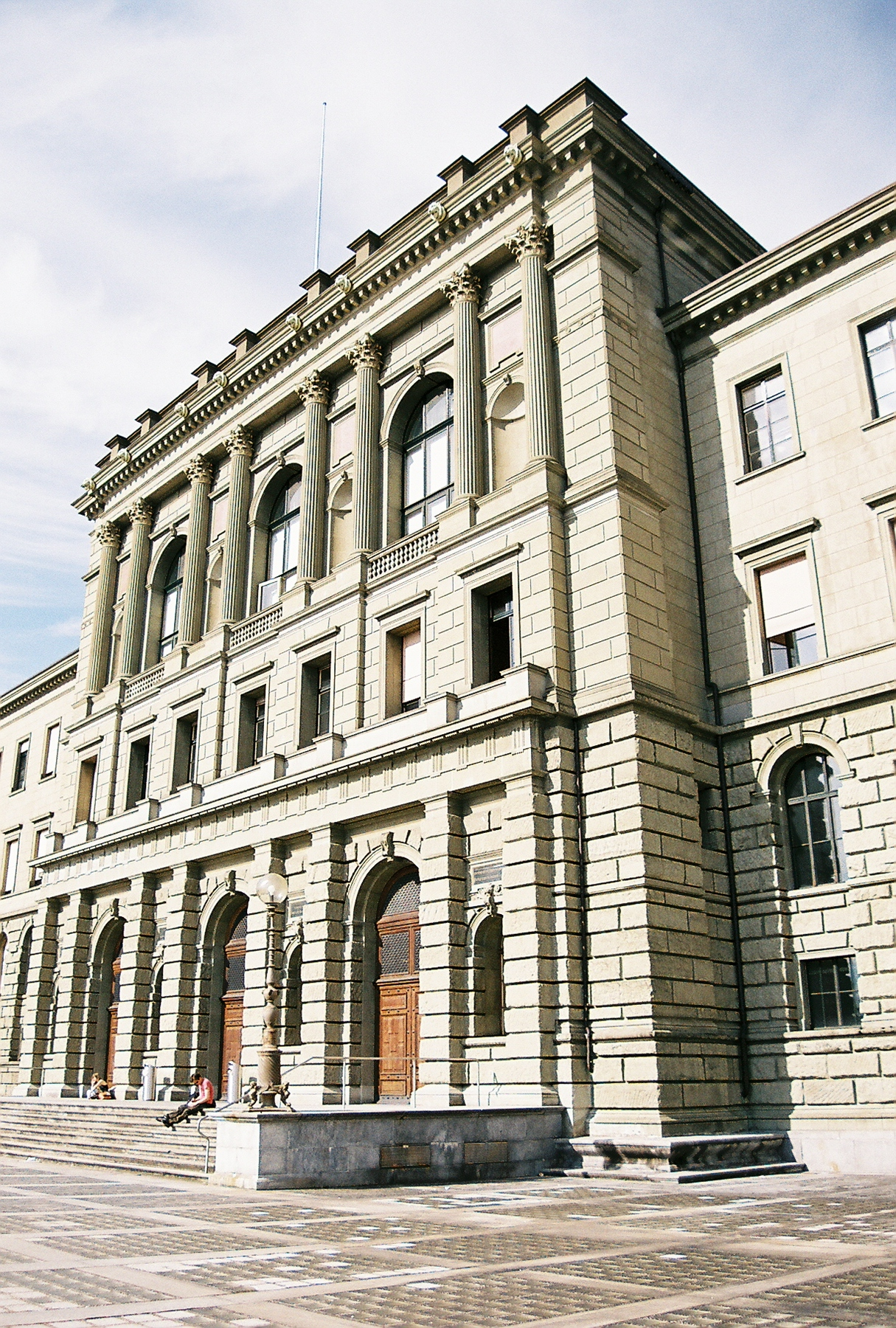
ETH Zurich, Switzerland, since 1854

=== Turkey ===
- Abant Izzet Baysal University Department of Architecture, Bolu
- Abdullah Gül University, Department of Architecture, Kayseri
- Akdeniz University, Fine Arts Faculty Department of Architecture, Antalya
- Antalya International University, School of Fine Arts and Architecture, Antalya
- Bahçeşehir University, Faculty of Architecture, Istanbul
- Beykent University, Faculty of Architecture, Istanbul
- Dokuz Eylül University, Faculty of Architecture, İzmir
- Gazi University, Faculty of Architecture, Ankara
- Gediz University, Department of Architecture, İzmir
- Fatih Sultan Mehmet Vakıf University, Faculty of Architecture and Design, Istanbul
- Istanbul Arel University, Faculty of engineering and Architecture, Istanbul
- Istanbul Bilgi University, Faculty of Architecture, Istanbul
- Istanbul Kültür University, Faculty of Architecture, Istanbul
- Istanbul Medipol University, Fine Arts Design and Architecture, Istanbul
- Istanbul Technical University, Faculty of Architecture, Istanbul
- İzmir Institute of Technology, Faculty of Architecture, İzmir
- İzmir University of Economics, Faculty of Architecture, İzmir
- Karadeniz Technical University, Faculty of Architecture, Trabzon
- Maltepe University, Faculty of Architecture, Istanbul
- Middle East Technical University, Faculty of Architecture, Ankara
- Mimar Sinan Fine Arts University, Faculty of Architecture, Istanbul
- Selçuk University, Department of Architecture, Konya
- TED University, Faculty of Architecture, Ankara
- Trakya University, Faculty of Architecture, Edirne
- Yaşar University, Faculty of Architecture,Izmir
- Yeditepe University, Faculty of Engineering and Architecture, Istanbul
- Yıldız Technical University, Faculty of Architecture, Istanbul

=== Ukraine ===
- Donbasska State Academy of Construction and Architecture, Faculty of Architecture, Makiivka
- Kharkiv National Academy of Urban Economy, Townplanning Faculty, Kharkiv
- Kharkiv State Technical University of Construction and Architecture, Faculty of Architecture, Kharkiv
- Kyiv National University of Construction and Architecture, Architectural Faculty, Kyiv
- National Academy of Fine Arts and Architecture, Faculty of Architecture, Kyiv
- National Academy of Nature Conservation and Resort's Construction, Architectural-Construction Faculty, Simferopol
- National University "Lvivska Politechnika", Institute of Architecture, Lviv
- Odesa State Academy of Construction and Architecture, Architectural and Art's Institute, Odesa
- Poltava National Technik University, Architectural Department, Poltava
- Prydniprovska State Academy of Civil Engineering and Architecture, Faculty of Architecture, Dnipro

=== United Kingdom ===
==== England ====
- Anglia Ruskin University, Department of Engineering and Built Environment, Chelmsford
- Architectural Association School of Architecture, London
- Arts University Bournemouth, School of Architecture, Bournemouth
- Bartlett School of Architecture, Faculty of the Built Environment, University College London, London
- Birmingham City University, Birmingham School of Architecture and Design, Birmingham
- Canterbury School of Architecture, University for the Creative Arts, Canterbury
- Coventry University, School of Architecture, Coventry
- De Montfort University, The Leicester School of Architecture, Leicester
- Hull College, Hull School of Art and Design, Hull
- University of Kent, Kent School of Architecture, Canterbury, Kent
- Kingston University, School of Architecture and Landscape, London
- Lancaster University, Lancaster, Lancashire
- Leeds Beckett University, Faculty of Arts, Environment and Technology, Leeds
- Liverpool John Moores University, Faculty of Media, Arts and Social Science Liverpool
- London Metropolitan University, School of Art, Architecture and Design, London
- London School of Architecture, London
- London South Bank University, Architecture and Design, South Bank, London
- Loughborough University, School of Architecture, Building and Civil Engineering, Loughborough
- Newcastle University, Newcastle University School of Architecture, Planning and Landscape, Faculty of Humanities and Social Sciences, Newcastle upon Tyne
- Northumbria University, Department of Architecture and Built Environment, Newcastle upon Tyne
- Norwich University of the Arts, School of Architecture, Norwich
- Nottingham Trent University (NTU), School of Architecture, Design and the Built Environment, Nottingham
- Oxford School of Architecture, Oxford Brookes University, Oxford
- Ravensbourne University London, Department of Architecture, Greenwich Peninsula, London
- Royal College of Art, School of Architecture, London
- The Manchester School of Architecture, Manchester
- Sheffield Hallam University, Department of Architecture and Planning, Sheffield
- University of the Arts London, Central Saint Martins College of Art and Design
- University of Bath Department of Architecture and Civil Engineering, Bath
- University of Brighton
- University of Cambridge, Department of Architecture, Cambridge
- University of Central Lancashire, The Grenfell-Baines School of Architecture, Preston
- University of East London, School of Architecture, Computing and Engineering, London
- University of Greenwich, Department of Architecture and Landscape, London
- University of Hertfordshire, Hertfordshire, United Kingdom
- University of Huddersfield, School of Art, Design and Architecture, Huddersfield
- University of Lancaster, Lancaster School of Architecture, Lancaster
- University of Leeds, Faculty of Engineering and Physical Sciences, Leeds
- University of Lincoln, Lincoln School of Architecture, Lincoln
- University of Liverpool, Liverpool University School of Architecture, Liverpool
- University of Nottingham, Department of Architecture and Built Environment, Nottingham
- University of Plymouth, School of Architecture, Design and Environment, Plymouth
- University of Portsmouth, UK
- University of Reading, School of Architecture, Reading, Berkshire
- University of Salford, Salford, Greater Manchester,
- University of Sheffield, Sheffield School of Architecture, Sheffield
- University of the West of England, Faculty of the Built Environment, Frenchay Campus, Bristol
- University of Westminster, School of Architecture and the Built Environment, Marylebone, London
- University of Wolverhampton, Wolverhampton

==== Northern Ireland ====
- Queens University of Belfast, School of Architecture
- The University of Ulster Architecture, School of Architecture, Belfast

==== Scotland ====
- University of Dundee, Dundee School of Architecture, Dundee
- ESALA, Edinburgh School of Architecture and Landscape Architecture
- Mackintosh School of Architecture, Glasgow School of Art (University of Glasgow), Glasgow
- Robert Gordon University, The Scott Sutherland School of Architecture, Aberdeen
- University of Strathclyde, Faculty of Engineering, Department of Architecture, Strathclyde

==== Wales ====
- Centre for Alternative Technology, Graduate School of the Environment, Machynlleth
- University of Wales Trinity Saint David, Faculty of Architecture, Computing and Engineering, Swansea
- Welsh School of Architecture, Cardiff University, Cardiff

== North America ==
=== Canada ===
==== Alberta ====
- University of Calgary School of Architecture, Planning and Landscape, Calgary

==== British Columbia ====
- University of British Columbia School of Architecture and Landscape Architecture, Vancouver

==== Manitoba ====
- University of Manitoba Faculty of Architecture, Winnipeg

==== Nova Scotia ====
- Dalhousie University (formerly Technical University of Nova Scotia) Faculty of Architecture and Planning, Halifax

==== Ontario ====
- Carleton University, Azrieli School of Architecture and Urbanism, Ottawa
- Laurentian University, McEwan School of Architecture, Greater Sudbury
- Toronto Metropolitan University, Faculty of Engineering, Architecture and Applied Science, Toronto
- University of Toronto, John H. Daniels Faculty of Architecture, Landscape, and Design, Toronto
- University of Waterloo, School of Architecture, Cambridge

==== Quebec ====
- McGill University School of Architecture, Montreal
- Université de Montréal, Faculté de l'aménagement, Montréal
- Université Laval, École d'Architecture, Faculté d'aménagement, d'architecture et des arts visuels

=== Mexico ===
- CEDIM, Centro de Estudios Superiores de Diseño de Monterrey, S.C., Departamento de Arquitectura
- Instituto Superior de Arquitectura y Diseño (ISAD), Chihuahua, Mexico
- ITESM, Carrera de Arquitectura
- ITESO, Instituto Tecnologico de Estudios Superiores de Occidente
- UDG, Universidad de Guadalajara, Centro Universitario de Arte, Arquitectura y Diseño
- UG, Universidad de Guanajuato, Departamento de Arquitectura
- UIA, Universidad Iberoamericana, Departamento de Arquitectura
- UNAM, Facultad de Arquitectura, Mexico City
- UADY, Faculty of Architecture – Facultad de Arquitectura, Mérida, Yucatán
- UANL, Univestidad Autónoma de Nuevo León, Facultad de Arquitectura
- UA, Universidad Anáhuac Mexico Norte, Departamento de Arquitectura
- Universidad Autonoma the Guadalajara (UAG)
- Universidad de las Americas Puebla (UDLAP), Departamento de Arquitectura
- Universidad de Monterrey, Universidad de Monterrey, Departamento de Arquitectura

=== Puerto Rico ===
- Escuela de Arquitectura de la Pontificia Universidad Católica de Puerto Rico, Ponce, Puerto Rico

== Central America ==
=== Costa Rica ===
- Costa Rica Institute of Technology, Escuela de Arquitectura y Urbanismo, Campus San José, San José
- Universidad Autónoma de Centro América, Curridabat
- Universidad Central de Costa Rica, Escuela de Ingenierías y Arquitectura, Barrio Escalante
- Universidad Creativa de Costa Rica
- University of Costa Rica, Escuela de Arquitectura, San José
- Universidad de las Ciencias y el Arte, facultad de Diseño, San José
- Universidad Hispanoamericana, Escuela de Arquitectura, Barrio Escalante
- Universidad Interamericana, Facultad de Ingeniería y Arquitectura, Heredia, Costa Rica|Heredia
- Universidad Internacional de las Américas, Facultad de Ingeniería y Arquitectura, San José
- Universidad Latina de Costa Rica, Facultad de Ingeniería y Arquitectura
- Universidad Latinoamericana de las Ciencias y la Tecnología, Facultad de Ingenierías y Arquitectura, Escuela de Arquitectura
- Universidad Veritas, Escuela de Arte, Diseño y Arquitectura

=== Cuba ===
- Instituto Superior Politecnico de Julio Antonio Mella
- Jose Antonio Echeverria Higher Technical University
- Universidad Central Marta Abreu de las Villas, Facultad de Arquitectura

=== Dominican Republic ===
- Pontifica Universidad Católica Madre y Maestra
- Universidad Autónoma de Santo Domingo
- Universidad Católica Nordestana
- Universidad Central del Este
- Universidad Dominicana O & M
- Universidad Iberoamericana
- Universidad Nacional Pedro Henríquez Ureña
- Universidad Tecnológica de Santiago
- Instituto Nacional de Ciencias Exactas
- Universidad Católica del Cibao

=== El Salvador ===
- Universidad Albert Einstein
- Universidad Católica de El Salvador
- Universidad Centroamericana José Simeon Cañas
- Universidad de El Salvador
- Universidad de Oriente
- Universidad Dr. José Matías Delgado
- Universidad Francisco Gavidia
- Universidad Gerardo Barrios
- Universidad Politécnica de El Salvador
- Universidad Tecnológica de El Salvador

=== Guatemala ===
- Universidad de San Carlos de Guatemala
- Universidad del Istmo
- Universidad Francisco Marroquín
- Universidad Mariano Galvez
- Universidad Mesoamericana
- Universidad Rafael Landívar

=== Honduras ===
- Universidad Nacional Autónoma de Honduras, Campus Tegucigalpa
- Universidad José Cecilio Del Valle
- Universidad Católica de Honduras
- Universidad de San Pedro Sula
- Universidad Tecnologica Centroamericana
- Centro de Diseño, Arquitectura y Construcción (CEDAC)

=== Nicaragua ===
- Universidad Católica REDEMPTORIS MATER
- Universidad Centroamericana
- Universidad del Valle
- Universidad Iberoamericana de Ciencia y Tecnología
- Universidad Nacional de Ingeniería

=== Panama ===
- Columbus University, Escuela de Arquitectura
- Isthmus, Escuela de Arquitectura y Diseño de América Latina y el Caribe
- Quality Leadership University
- Universidad Católica Santa María la Antigua, Escuela de Diseño
- Universidad de Panamá, Facultad de Arquitectura, Escuela de Arquitectura
- Universidad Autónoma de Chiriquí, Facultad de Arquitectura UNACHI
- Universidad Interamericana de Panamá, Facultad de Ingenierías y Arquitectura, Escuela de Arquitectura
- Universidad Tecnológica de Panamá, Escuela de Ingenierías

== South America ==
=== Argentina ===
- Universidad Argentina John F. Kennedy, Escuela de Arquitectura, Buenos Aires
- Universidad Blas Pascal, Facultad de Arquitectura, Córdoba
- Universidad Católica de Córdoba, Facultad de Arquitectura, Córdoba
- Universidad Católica de La Plata, Facultad de Arquitectura y Diseño, La Plata
- Universidad Católica de Salta, Facultad de Arquitectura y Urbanismo, Salta
- Universidad Católica de Santa Fe, Facultad de Arquitectura y Diseño, Santa Fe
- Universidad de Belgrano, Facultad de Arquitectura y Urbanismo, Belgrano
- Universidad de Buenos Aires, Facultad de Arquitectura, Diseño y Urbanismo, Buenos Aires
- Universidad de Flores, Facultad de Planeamiento Socio-Ambiental, Buenos Aires, Cipolletti
- Universidad de Mendoza, Facultad de Arquitectura, Urbanismo y Diseño, Mendoza/
- Universidad de Moron, Facultad de Arquitectura, Diseño, Arte y Urbanismo, Moron
- Universidad Nacional de Córdoba, Facultad de Arquitectura, Urbanismo y Diseño, Córdoba
- Universidad Nacional de La Plata, Facultad de Arquitectura y Urbanismo, La Plata
- Universidad Nacional de Mar del Plata, Facultad de Arquitectura, Urbanismo y Diseño, Mar Del Plata
- Universidad de Palermo, Facultad de Arquitectura, Buenos Aires
- Universidad Nacional de Rosario, Facultad de Arquitectura, Planeamiento y Diseño, Rosario
- Universidad Nacional de San Juan, Facultad de Arquitectura, San Juan
- Universidad Nacional de Tucumán, Facultad de Arquitectura y Urbanismo, Tucumán
- Universidad Nacional del Litoral, Facultad de Arquitectura, Diseño y Urbanismo, Santa Fe
- Universidad Nacional del Nordeste, Facultad de Arquitectura y Urbanismo Resistencia, Chaco
- Universidad Torcuato di Tella, Escuela de Arquitectura y Estudios Urbanos, Buenos Aires

=== Brazil ===
- Centro Universitário Augusto Motta, UNISUAM, Rio de Janeiro
- Centro Universitário Belas Artes de São Paulo, CUBASP, São Paulo
- Centro Universitário Izabela Hendrix, Belo Horizonte
- Escola da Cidade, AEAUSP, São Paulo
- Pontifícia Universidade Católica do Rio Grande do Sul, PUC-RS
- Universidade de Brasília, UnB, Faculdade de Arquitetura e Urbanismo, Brasília
- Universidade de Fortaleza, UNIFOR, Fortaleza
- Universidade de São Paulo, USP, Faculdade de Arquitetura e Urbanismo, São Paulo
- Centro Universitário Filadélfia – UNIFIL, Londrina, Paraná, Portal
- Universidade do Vale do Rio dos Sinos, UNISINOS
- Universidade Estadual de Campinas, UNICAMP, Faculdade de Engenharia Civil, Arquitetura e Urbanismo, Campinas
- Universidade Estadual de Londrina (UEL)
- Universidade Estadual Paulista Júlio de Mesquita Filho, UNESP
- Universidade Federal de Minas Gerais, UFMG, Faculdade de Arquitetura e Urbanismo, Belo Horizonte
- Universidade Federal de Pernambuco, UFPE
- Universidade Federal de Santa Catarina- UFSC
- Universidade Federal de Uberlândia (UFU)
- Universidade Federal de Viçosa (UFV)
- Universidade Federal do Ceará, UFC, Curso de Arquitetura e Urbanismo, Fortaleza
- Universidade Federal do Espírito Santo, UFES
- Universidade Federal do Pará, UFPA
- Universidade Federal do Paraná, UFPR
- Universidade Federal do Rio de Janeiro, UFRJ, Faculdade de Arquitetura e Urbanismo, Rio de Janeiro
- Universidade Federal do Rio Grande do Sul, UFRGS
- Universidade Presbiteriana Mackenzie, UPM, Faculdade de Arquitetura e Urbanismo, São Paulo
- Universidade São Francisco, USF, Curso de Arquitetura e Urbanismo, Itatiba
- Universidade Tecnológica Federal do Paraná, UTFPR

=== Chile ===
- Pontificia Universidad Católica de Chile Facultad de Arquitectura, Diseño y Estudios Urbanos
- Pontificia Universidad Católica de Valparaíso Escuela de Arquitectura y Diseño
- Universidad Católica del Norte Escuela de Arquitectura
- Universidad de Chile Facultad de Arquitectura y Urbanismo, Santiago
- Universidad Técnica Federico Santa María Departamento de Arquitectura

=== Colombia ===
- Pontificia Universidad Javeriana, Bogotá, Facultad de Arquitectura y Diseño
- Universidad Catolica de Colombia, Facultad de Arquitectura, RIBA Accredited Program, Bogotá
- Universidad de America, Facultad de Arquitectura y Urbanismo, Bogotá
- Universidad de Boyacá, Facultad de Arquitectura y Bellas Artes, Programa de Arquitectura, Especialización en Diseño Urbano, Maestría en Urbanismo, Tunja, Boyacá
- Universidad de Ibagué, Facultad de Humanidades, Programa de Arquitectura
- Universidad de La Salle, Colombia, Universidad de La Salle, Facultad Facultad de Ciencias del Hábitat, Bogotá
- Universidad Nacional de Colombia, Faculatad de Artes, Escuela de Arquitectura y Urbanismo, Bogotá
- Universidad Piloto De Colombia, Faculdad de Arquitectura y Artes, Programa de Arquitectura
- Universidad Pontificia Bolivariana, Facultad de Arquitectura y Diseño, Medellín

Arquitectura

- Universidad San Buenaventura, Facultad de Arquitectura
- Universidad Santo Tomas, Facultad de Arquitectura, Tunja
- Universidad de los Andes, Universidad de los Andes, Facultad de arquitectura y diseno, Bogotá
- University of Valle, Facultad de Artes Integradas, Escuela de Arquitectura, Cali
- University la Gran Colombia, Facultad de arquitectura, Bogotá

=== Ecuador ===
- Central University of Ecuador, School of Architecture and Urbanism, Quito
- Pontificia Universidad Católica del Ecuador, Facultad de Arquitectura, Diseño y Artes, Quito
- Universidad Católica de Santiago de Guayaquil, Guayaquil, Facultad de Arquitectura y Diseño Guayaquil
- Universidad de Cuenca, Cuenca, Ecuador, Facultad de Arquitectura
- Universidad San Francisco de Quito, Facultad de Arquitectura y Diseño Interior, Cumbaya, Quito

=== Peru ===
- Universidad Peruana de Ciencias Applicadas, Facultad de Arquitectura, Lima
- Pontificia Universidad Católica del Perú, Facultad de Arquitectura y Urbanismo, Lima
- Universidad Nacional de Ingeniería Facultad de Arquitectura, Urbanismo y Artes, Lima
- Universidad Nacional de San Antonio Abad del Cusco Facultad de Arquitectura y Artes Plásticas, Cusco
- Universidad Ricardo Palma, Facultad de Arquitectura y Urbanismo

=== Uruguay ===
- Universidad de la República, Facultad de Arquitectura, Montevideo
- Universidad ORT, Facultad de Arquitectura, Montevideo

=== Venezuela ===
- Instituto Universitario Politecnico Santiago Mariño, Maracaibo, Cabimas, Ciudad Ojeda, Barinas, Mérida, San Cristobal, Caracas, Valencia, Maracay, Barcelona, Maturín, Puerto Ordaz y Porlamar, Facultad De Arquitectura
- Facultad de Arquitectura y Urbanismo de la Universidad Central de Venezuela en Caracas
- Facultad de Arquitectura de la Universidad Santa María en Caracas
- Escuela de Arquitectura de la Universidad Simon Bolivar en Caracas
- Facultad de Arquitectura y Urbanismo de la Universidad de Los Andes en Mérida
- Facultad de Arquitectura y Diseño de la Universidad del Zulia en Maracaibo
- Facultad de Arquitectura y Urbanismo de la Universidad de Carabobo en Valencia

== Oceania ==
=== Australia ===
State	City	University	Faculty	School	Year founded	Reference
Australian Capital Territory	Canberra	University of Canberra	School of Design and the Built Environment			
New South Wales	Sydney	University of New South Wales	School of the Built Environment (Arts, Design, Architecture)	School of Architecture		
New South Wales	Newcastle	University of Newcastle	School of Architecture and Built Environment	School of Architecture	1961	
New South Wales	Sydney	University of Sydney		Sydney School of Architecture, Design and Planning	1920	
New South Wales	Sydney	University of Technology	Faculty of Design, Architecture and Building	School of Architecture		
New South Wales	Sydney	Western Sydney University	School of Engineering, Design and Built Environment	Architecture	2017	
Northern Territory	Darwin	Charles Darwin University		School of Creative Arts and Humanities		
Queensland	Brisbane	Queensland University of Technology	Faculty of Engineering	School of Architecture and Built Environment	1919	
Queensland	Brisbane	The University of Queensland	School of Architecture, Design and Planning	School of Architecture	1937	
Queensland	Gold Coast	Griffith University	Griffith School of Environment			(not accredited)
Queensland	Gold Coast	Bond University		Soheil Abedian School of Architecture	2011 (first accredited 2014)	
South Australia	Adelaide	University of Adelaide	School of Architecture and Civil Engineering	School of Architecture and Landscape Architecture	1958	
South Australia	Adelaide	University of South Australia	UniSA Creative	Louis Laybourne Smith School of Architecture and Design	1906	
Tasmania	Launceston	University of Tasmania	College of Sciences and Engineering (Built, Digital and Natural Environments)	School of Architecture and Design		
Victoria	Geelong	Deakin University	School of Architecture and Built Environment	School of Architecture	1972	
Victoria	Melbourne	Monash University	Art, Design and Architecture	Department of Architecture		
Victoria	Melbourne	RMIT University		School of Architecture and Design		
Victoria	Melbourne	University of Melbourne	Faculty of Architecture, Building and Planning	Melbourne School of Design, Architecture	1919 (Bachelor's degree started 1927, first bachelor's degrees 1931)	
Western Australia	Perth	Curtin University	School of Design and Built Environment	School of Architecture	1968	
Western Australia	Perth	University of Western Australia	Faculty of Architecture, Landscape and Visual Arts	School of Architecture		

=== New Zealand ===
- Unitec New Zealand, architecture and landscape, Auckland
- University of Auckland, National Institute of Creative Arts and Industries, School of Architecture and Planning, Auckland
- Victoria University of Wellington, School of Architecture, Wellington
- Ara Institute of Canterbury, Bachelor of Architectural Studies (Architectural Technology), Christchurch
