= Faculty of Architecture, Urbanism and Arts =

Arts school of the National University of Engineering (Peru)

- Facultad de Arquitectura, Urbanismo y Artes
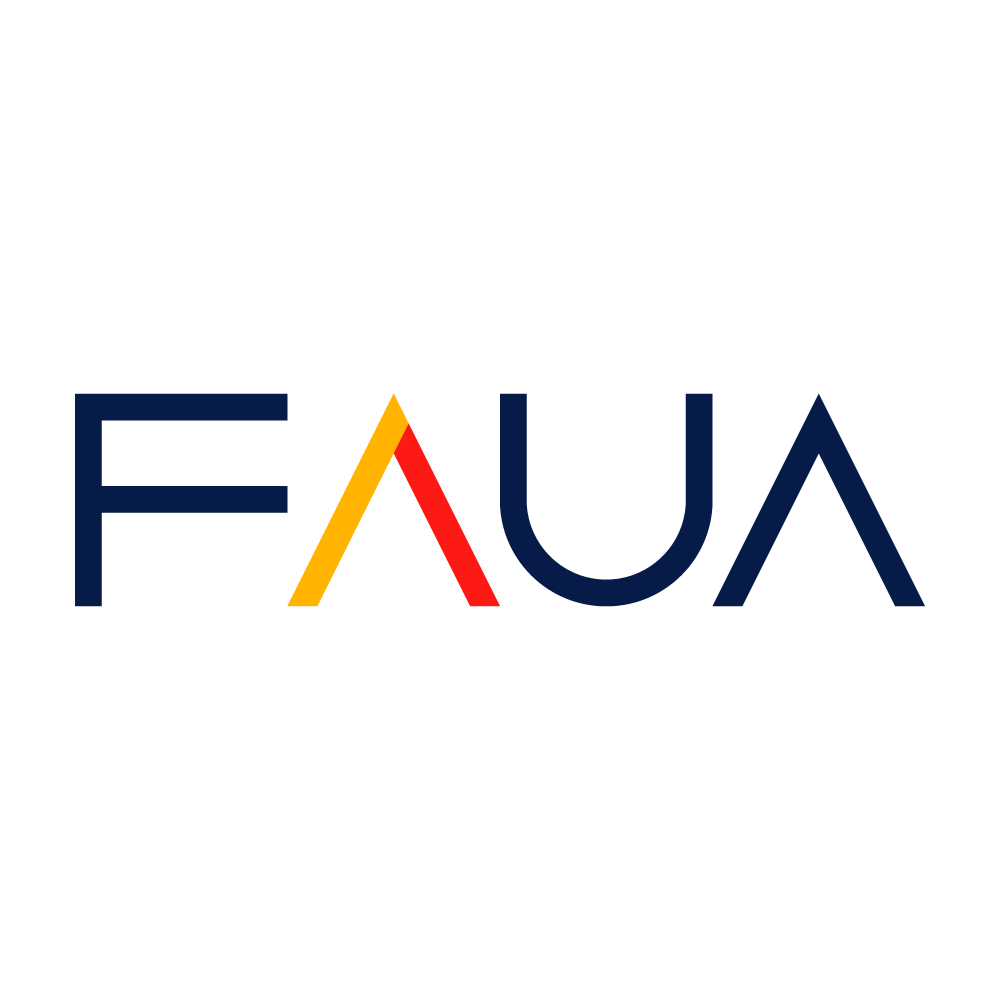
- Logo of Faculty of Architecture, Urbanism and Arts
- Type: Public
- Established: 1910
- Dean: Jose Beingolea
- Academic staff: 131
- Undergraduates: 852
- Location: Lima, Peru; 12.0216°S 77.0500°W
- Campus: Urban
- Colours: Yellow, red and blue
- Website: faua.uni.edu.pe

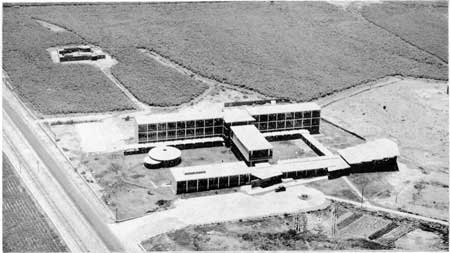
The faculty building was designed by the Italian architect Mario Bianco in the early 1950s.

The Faculty of Architecture, Urbanism and Arts (Spanish: Facultad de Arquitectura, Urbanismo y Artes) commonly referred as FAUA is one of the eleven constituent faculties of the National University of Engineering (Universidad Nacional de Ingeniería) located in Lima, Peru. It was founded in 1910 as the Special Section of Builders Architects (Sección Especial de Arquitectos Constructores) making it the first school of architecture to be established in Peru. The faculty is traditionally known as one of the leading schools of architecture in Peru because it paved the way of architecture in the country. Also, it is an accredited school by the Royal Institute of British Architects.

== History ==
Before the foundation of the school, architecture was taught as a specialized course for scientists at the National University of San Marcos since 1868 and for civil engineers after the foundation in 1876 of the School of Engineers (Escuela de Ingenieros). The faculty was established by president Augusto B. Leguía on April 30, 1910 under the direction of Polish architect Ricardo de Jaxa Malachowski. During its early years, the curriculum was dominated by the courses on construction and sciences, however, as time passed, the influence of the teaching methodology of the Beaux-Arts increased. In 1946, as a result of a new organization within the School of Engineers, the Special Section of Builders Architects changed its name to Department of Architecture (Departamento de Arquitectura). This reform gave rise to modern architecture ideas as the influence of academic architecture in the school had started to decline. Such change in the curriculum was complemented with the visits of foreign architects like Walter Gropius and Josep Lluís Sert in 1953. The first one of them attended the graduation ceremony of that year. In 1955 as the School of Engineers became the National University of Engineering, the faculty changed its name to the present one.

The construction of the present building of the faculty began in 1951 with funds from the Peruvian State, private companies and even teachers and students. The architectural design was made by the Italian architect Mario Bianco. The building was one of the first to be constructed in the campus. Its completion was the result of a concerted effort successfully led by the Peruvian architect Fernando Belaunde who was chief of the Departement at that time. The construction was finished in 1955 and the building became one of the finest examples of modern architecture in Peru.

== Academics ==
Admission for freshmen includes the regular three-day-examination of the National University of Engineering plus a vocational examination intended to measure whether a candidate is skillful to learn architecture or not, this test was given for the first time in 1952. The faculty enrolls up to 48 students every semester. The undergraduate courses are divided into academic areas such as architectural design, urbanism, history and social sciences, technology and construction and applied arts among others. The faculty grants the Bachelor of Architecture degree, after successfully completing the five-year curriculum, and the Master of Architecture degree, after the successful defense of a thesis.

== Bibliography ==
- (in Spanish) Álvarez Ortega, Syra. La formación en arquitectura en el Perú, antecedentes, inicios y desarrollo hasta 1955, Lima: Instituto de Investigación de la Facultad de Arquitectura, Urbanismo y Artes, 2006. ISBN 9972-794-11-3
- (in Spanish) Linder, Alfredo. "Recuerdos de Walter Gropius". In El Arquitecto Peruano, Nº 353–354, July–August, 1969.
- (in Spanish) López Soria, José Ignacio. Breve historia de la Universidad Nacional de Ingeniería, Lima: Empresa petrolera Unipetro ABC, 2003.
