= ALFA University College =

University College in Selangor, Malaysia

ALFA University College (AUC)
- Former names: Kolej Alif (1998–2004); ALFA College (2004-2021); ALFA International College (2008-2021)
- Motto: A Leader For All
- Type: Private
- Established: 1999
- Chairman: Prof. Dr. Shaharuddin bin Mohd Satha
- Director: Fairuz Bin Kamarulzaman
- Students: 1900 (As of December 2025)
- Location: Subang Jaya, Selangor, Malaysia; 3.06188°N 101.59349°E
- Campus: Subang Jaya
- Colors: Red
- Website: www.alfa.edu.my

ALFA University College, abbreviated as AUC, is a private university college located in USJ 1 Subang Jaya, Selangor, Malaysia. The college currently offers professional certificates and conventional programs in arts, design, education, hospitality, engineering and business.

== See also ==
- List of private college-universities in Malaysia
- List of international architecture schools
- List of architecture schools
