= Cyprus School of Architecture =

School associated with Cyprus College of Art

The Cyprus School of Architecture (CYSOA) is private school of architecture located in Lemba near Paphos, Cyprus. The School is associated and shares a campus with the Cyprus College of Art.

The School was founded in 2017 by Emilio Koutsoftides, grandson of the Cypriot painter Stass Paraskos.

== Summer Residencies ==
The Cyprus School of Architecture is most well known for its summer residency programme which takes place annually for the last two weeks of August.
