= Faculty of Architecture and Arts at the Lusíada University of Porto =

Architecture school at the Lusíada University of Porto

Coordinates: 41°10′36″N 8°34′55″W

- Type: Private
- Established: 1991
- Dean: Francisco Peixoto Alves
- Location: Porto, Portugal
- Website: FAAULP

The Faculty of Architecture and Arts at the Lusíada University of Porto (Portuguese: Faculdade de Arquitectura e Artes da Universidade Lusíada do Porto) is a private institution that offers undergraduate and postgraduate studies in architecture and design. Located in Porto, Portugal, FAAULP belongs to the Lusíada University of Porto.

== Honorary doctors ==
- Álvaro Siza
- Eduardo Souto de Moura

== See also ==
- Lusíada University of Porto
