= Lusíada University of Porto =

University in Porto, Portugal

Coordinates: 41°10′33″N 8°34′57″W

- Universidade Lusíada do Porto
- Motto: sol lucet omnibus
- Motto in English: The sun shines over everyone
- Type: Private
- Established: 1991
- Affiliations: APESP
- President: Diamantino Durão
- Faculty: 235
- Students: 3,374
- Location: Porto, Portugal
- Campus: Urban, 16.45 acres (6.66 ha)
- Colors: Dark blue and Yellow
- Website: por.ulusiada.pt

The Lusíada University - North (former Universidade Lusíada do Porto) is a Portuguese private university located in Porto and founded in 1991.

== Organization ==
Currently 3 374 students attend the courses provided by ULP's three faculties and two institutes.

- Faculty of Architecture and Arts
- Faculty of Law
- Faculty of Economics and Business
- Institute of Psychology and Educational Sciences
- Institute of Postgraduate

== Faculty, staff and alumni ==
- Francisco Assis
- José Eduardo Pinto da Costa
- Manuel Monteiro
- Sónia Araújo
- José Luís Carneiro

== Honorary doctors ==
=== Faculty of Architecture and Arts ===
- Álvaro Siza
- Eduardo Souto de Moura

=== Others ===
- Agustina Bessa-Luís
- 14th Dalai Lama (Tenzin Gyatso)
- Valéry Giscard d'Estaing

== See also ==
- Faculty of Architecture and Arts at the Lusíada University of Porto
