= Sonargaon University =

Bangladeshi University

- সোনারগাঁও বিশ্ববিদ্যালয়
- Motto: We will rise up, We will shine
- Type: Private
- Established: 2012
- Chancellor: President Mohammed Shahabuddin
- Vice-Chancellor: Shamim Ara Hassan
- Location: Dhaka, Bangladesh; 23.7526°N 90.3872°E
- Campus: The Permanent Campus is located in the Daserkandi area of Ward No. 75 of Khilgaon, This campus is built on about 2 acres of land.
- Website: su.edu.bd

Sonargaon University (Bengali: সোনারগাঁও বিশ্ববিদ্যালয়; SU) is a private university in Dhaka, Bangladesh. It has four faculties: Science and Engineering; Business and Economics; Humanities and Social Science; and Law and Justice.

It has been accredited by the government of Bangladesh, curricula, and academics while its programs have been approved by the University Grants Commission (UGC). It was established under the Private University Act 2010 with the approval of the government of Bangladesh in December 2012 for awarding degrees in various fields.

== Departments ==
=== Faculty of Business ===
- Department of Business Administration

=== Faculty of Science & Engineering ===
- Department of Architecture
- Department of Computer Science and Engineering
- Department of Civil Engineering
- Department of Electrical and Electronics Engineering
- Department of Naval Architecture and Marine Engineering
- Department of Textile Engineering
- Department of Fashion Design and Technology
- Department of Apparel Manufacture and Technology
- Department of Mechanical Engineering

=== Faculty of Arts and Humanities ===
- Department of Law

== Undergraduate programs ==
- Bachelor of Architecture.(B.Arc.)
- Bachelor of Business Administration (BBA).
- Bachelor of Science in Computer Science and Engineering (CSE).
- Bachelor of Science in Civil Engineering (BCE)
- Bachelor of Science in Electrical and Electronics Engineering (EEE).
- Bachelor of Naval Architecture and Marine Engineering (NAME)
- Bachelor of Textile Engineering (TEX)
- Bachelor of Fashion Design and Technology (FDT)
- Bachelor of Apparel Manufacture and Technology (AMT)
- Bachelor of Mechanical Engineering. (BME)
- Bachelor of Laws. (LLB)

== Graduate programs ==
=== Faculty of Business ===
- Executive Master of Business Administration (EMBA)
- MBA in Apparel Merchandising (MAM)
- MBA in Supply Chain Management (MSCM)
- MBA in Textile & Fashion Marketing
- Masters in Bank Management (MBM)
- Masters of Business Administration (MBA)
- Regular Master of Business Administration (RMBA)

=== Faculty of Arts and Humanities ===
- Department of Law (LLM 2 years)
- Department of Law (LLM 1 year)
