= Souphanouvong University =

University in Laos

- ມະຫາວິທະຍາໄລ ສຸພານຸວົງ
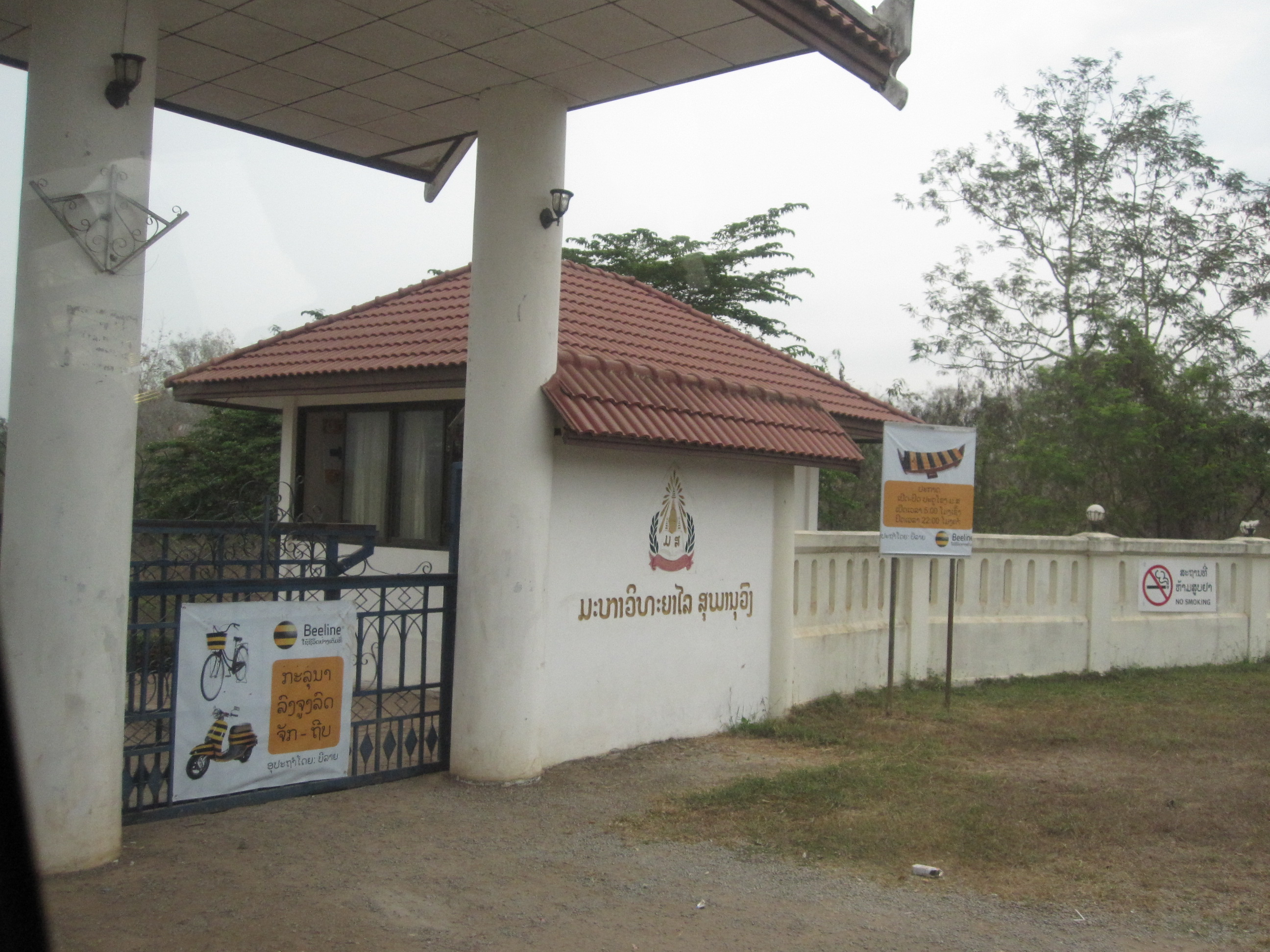
- Souphanouvong University front gate
- Type: Public
- Established: November 2003; 22 years ago
- Location: Luang Prabang; 19.9233°N 102.1864°E

Souphanouvong University (SU) is a public university located in Luang Prabang, Laos.

== History ==
SU was established in accordance with the Prime Minister Decree, No 169/PM, dated 4 November 2003, and inaugurated on the following day. It is named after Prince Souphanouvong, who was the first President of the Democratic People's Republic of Laos.

In 2018, SU helped to establish the first Confucius Institute in northern Laos (together with the Kunming University of Science and Technology).

== Programmes and courses ==
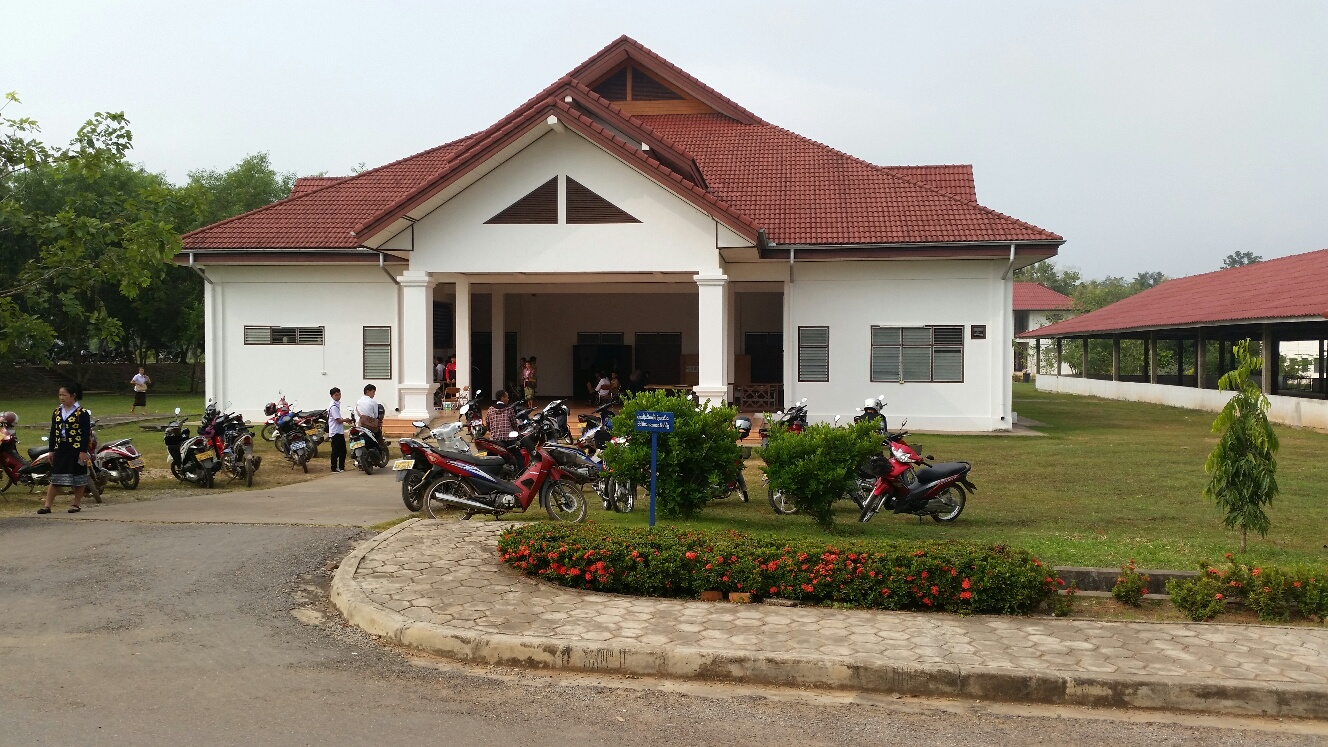
SU's auditorium

The Faculty of Languages has two programmes and two centres: Lao language, general English language, Korean Language Centre and the Chinese Language Centre.
