= Tohwa University =

Private University in Japan

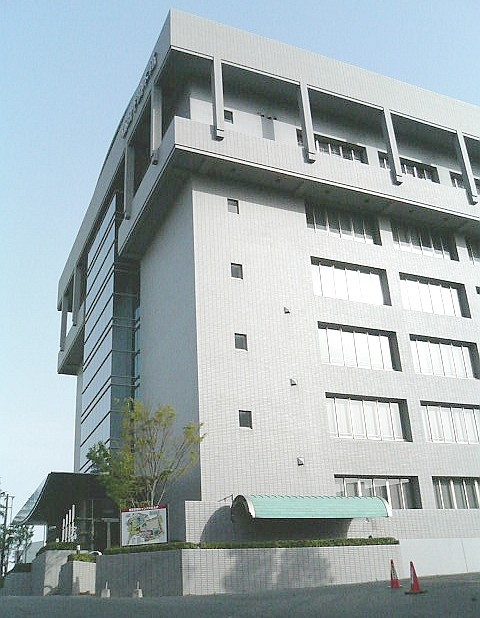
Tohwa University

Tohwa University (東和大学, Tōwa daigaku) was a private university in Fukuoka, Fukuoka, Japan, established in 1967. It closed in 2011.
