= Tohoku Bunka Gakuen University =

Coordinates: 38°16′36.1″N 140°50′2.9″E

- 東北文化学園大学
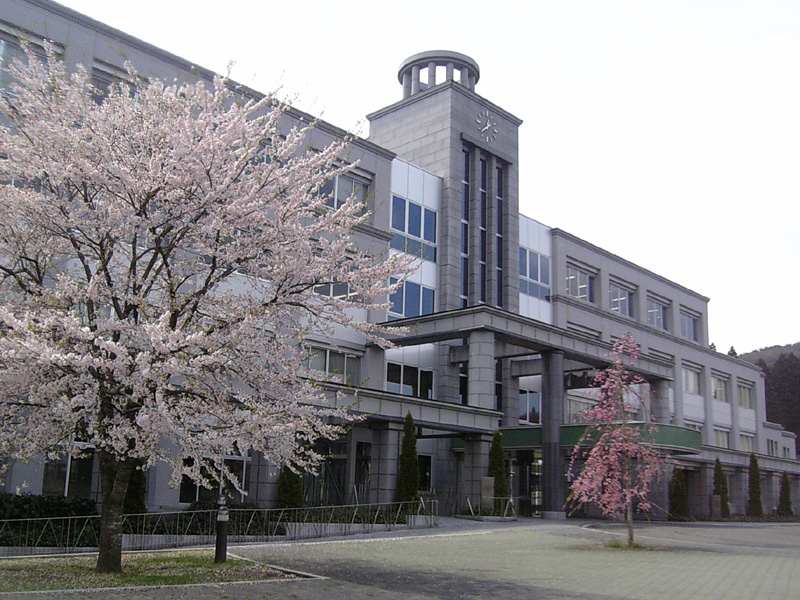
- Tohoku Bunka Gakuen University Main Building
- Type: Private
- Established: 1978 / 1999
- Location: Aoba-ku, Sendai, Miyagi Prefecture, Japan
- Website: Official website

Tohoku Bunka Gakuen University (東北文化学園大学, Tōhoku bunka gakuen daigaku) is a private university in Sendai, Miyagi, Japan, established in 1999. The predecessor of the school was founded in 1978.
