= El Shorouk Academy =

- أكاديمية الشروق
- Type: Private
- Established: 1995; 31 years ago
- President: Ahmed Abdel Rehem
- Location: El Shorouk, Egypt; 30.119757°N 31.606534°E
- Campus: Urban
- Website: sha.edu.eg
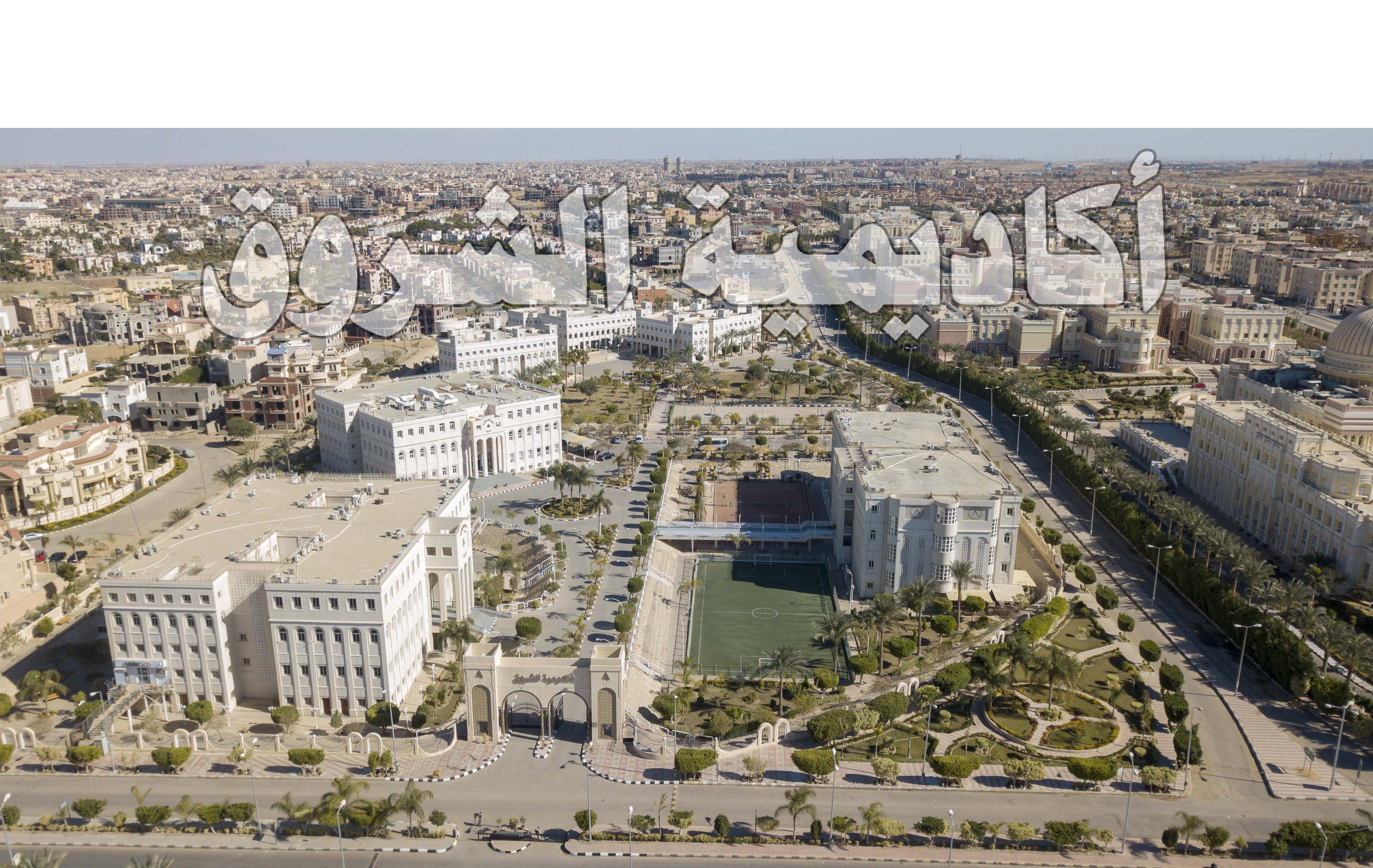

El Shorouk Academy is a private Egyptian educational academy, officially licensed by the Ministry of Higher Education and Scientific Research, and offering programs in Architecture, Engineering, Mass communication, Media, Computer science, Accounting, Management Information Systems and Business administration, it is located in El Shorouk, Cairo Governorate, Egypt and has been operating since 1995

== History ==
The Academy was founded as The Higher Institute of Engineering in the year 1995 and its campus was located in 10th of Ramadan City, Giza, Egypt with only 5 engineering departments (Architectural Engineering, Biomedical Engineering, Chemical Engineering, Communication & Computer Engineering, and Power & Electrical Machines Engineering). Later on, the campus was relocated to El Shorouk City with the start of second term of the year 1999/2000 after the approval from the Ministry of Higher Education (Egypt) which has issued a ministerial decree no. 712 dated 31/5/2000.Then the Civil Engineering Department was established by the ministerial decree no.1437 dated 10/09/2000 and the first year of study was 2000/2001, in a later stage the Mathematics and Physics Engineering department was established to make a total of 7 engineering departments.

The Higher Institute of Computer & Information Technology was established on 09/06/2001, then after 8 years The Higher International Institute of Mass Communication Was established based on the ministerial decree no. 1216 dated 09/06/2009 including the following departments (News Production, Media Production, and Media Marketing).

== Campuses ==
The Academy has two campuses and both are located in El Shorouk City, the main campus houses The higher Institute of Engineering and The Higher Institute of Computer & Information Technology. The secondary campus houses The Higher International Institute of Mass Communication.

== Academics ==
The academy is composed of three institutes which are listed below:

The Higher Institute of Engineering:

The institute is registered at Egyptian Engineers Syndicate and all of its graduates can also register at the Egyptian Engineers Syndicate, this registration is the Licensure to practice engineering in Egypt.

The management of the institute has updated the academic courses of different programs adding a new section (Petrochemical Engineering) to he chemical Engineering department, these updates was accredited by the ministerial decree (2381) dated 04/07/2019, the academic year 2019/2020 is the first year to adapt these updates.

Currently The Higher Institute of Engineering consists of the following departments:

- Architectural Engineering
- Biomedical Engineering
- Chemical Engineering
- Civil Engineering
- Communication & Computer Engineering
- Mathematics and Engineering Physics
- Power & Electrical Machines Engineering

The Higher Institute of Computer & Information Technology

and consist of the following departments:

- Computer Science
- Management Information Systems
- Business Administration & Accounting

The language of the study of the Computer science is English, Arabic and English for Management Information systems, and Arabic only for Business Administration & Accounting. All the departments are accredited from the Ministry of Higher Education (Egypt) and have received the equivalency from the Egyptian Supreme Council of Universities in Egypt which provide graduates the same rights and duties that is given by the Egyptian public universities like registration in syndicates and postgraduate studies.

The Higher International Institute of Mass Communication

On 09/03/2018 the academic list was updated by the ministerial decree no. 966 and currently include the following departments:

- Journalism
- Radio and television
- Public relations and media

All of which accredited from the Ministry of Higher Education (Egypt) and have received the equivalency from the Egyptian Supreme Council of Universities in Egypt which provide graduates the same rights and duties that is given by the Egyptian public universities like registration in syndicates and postgraduate studies.
