= Sani Şener =

Turkish construction magnate (born 1955)

Sani Sener
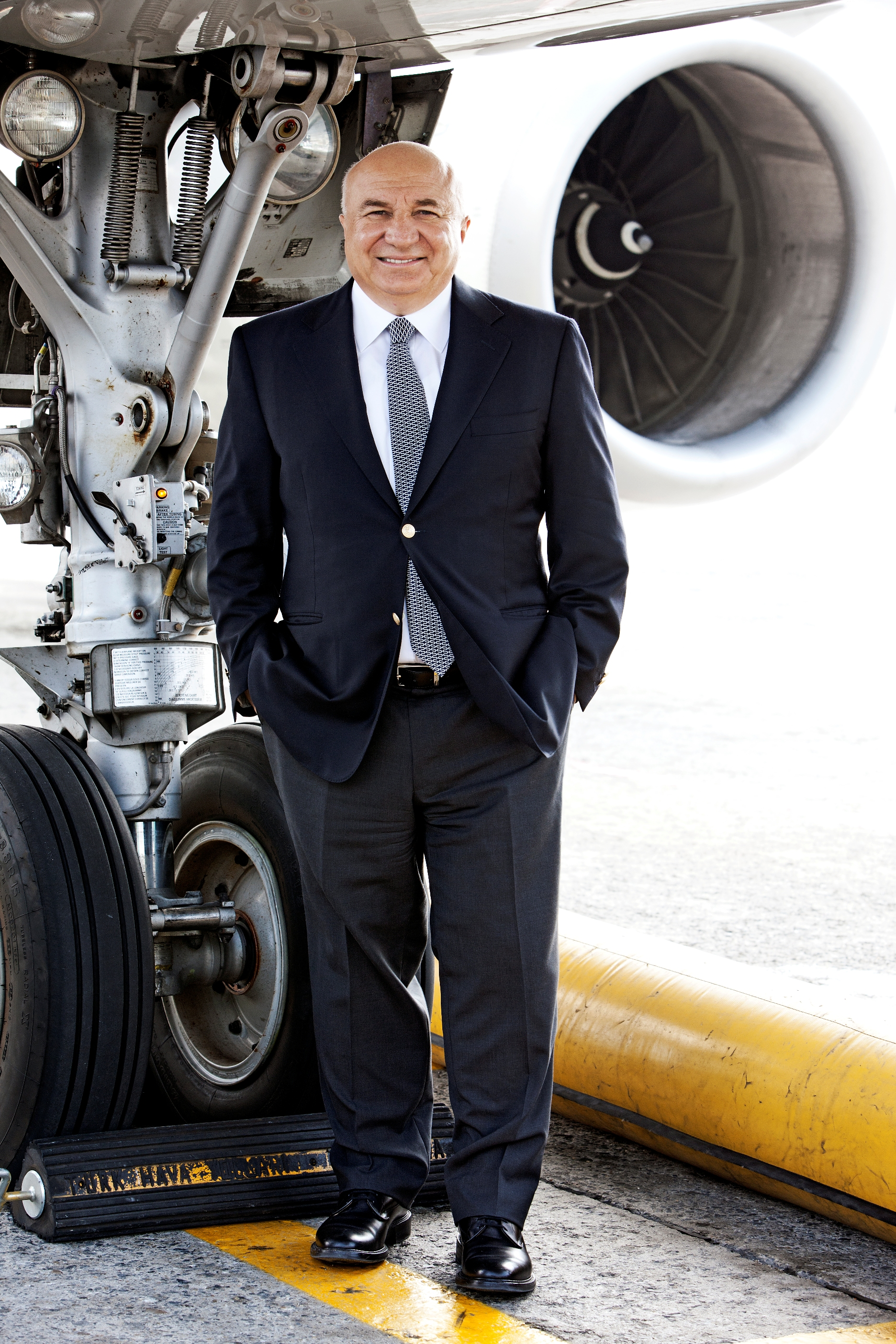
- Born: February 14, 1955 (age 71); Trabzon, Turkey
- Education: Karadeniz Technical University and University of Sussex
- Occupation: Businessperson
- Organization(s): TAV Airports Holding and TAV Construction

Mustafa Sani Şener (born 14 February 1955) is a Turkish construction magnate. He was the founding partner of TAV Airports who served as a member of Board of Directors and was President and CEO between 1997-2022. On 1 May 2022, he was appointed as the Vice Chairman of the Board. Also he is the co-founder and Chairman of the Board of TAV Construction.

== Early years ==
Sani Şener was born in Trabzon, Turkey, as the third and last child of prominent Turkish bureaucrat and politician Ahmet Şener (1921–1991) and Feride Şener (née Külür). Sani has one older brother, Sadri Şener and an older sister, Sezer Şener Komsuoğlu.

Sener graduated from Karadeniz Technical University (KTU) Faculty of Mechanical Engineering in 1977. He earned his master’s degree (M. Phil) in fluid mechanics in 1979 from University of Sussex in the UK. He was awarded an Honorary Doctorate in engineering from KTU for “his invaluable contributions to the development of Turkish engineering at the international level”, as well as an Honorary Doctorate in Business Administration from the New Hampshire University “for his accomplishments in project and risk management throughout his tenure at TAV”. Prior to his career at TAV Airports, Şener served in various positions, from project manager to general manager, in national and international projects.

== Career ==
Founded in 1997 with the Istanbul Ataturk Airport BOT project, TAV Airports achieved huge financial and operational growth under the leadership of M.Sani Sener. Today the company manages a portfolio of 15 airports in 8 countries.

Sani Şener managed and led many development projects ranging from dam construction to housing complexes; from hospitals, universities, airports, highways, trade centers, tunnels to power plants in Turkey and abroad since 1979. M. Sani Şener is best known for his leadership in design, construction, financing and operation of the Istanbul Atatürk Airport’s international terminal building and its side facilities project in 1997. Under his leadership, TAV Airports was founded as a joint-stock company for Istanbul Atatürk Airport’s 500 thousand m2 of construction and operation project which was one of the first major airport Build-Operate-Transfer (BOT) projects in the world. The construction of the colossal project was complete in only 22 months, 8 months ahead of schedule.

Şener, who has been the Chairman of the Board of TAV Airports since the Istanbul Atatürk Airport project, became the Vice Chairman of TAV Airports Holding, which had 35 thousand employees, to which 24 companies are affiliated, and the founding partner and Chairman of the Board of TAV Construction.

Şener previously served on the Board of Airports Council International (ACI World) and acted as the chairman of the Foreign Economic Relations Board of Türkiye (DEIK) Turkey-France and Turkey-Croatia business councils. Since January 2022, Şener is acting as the Chairman of the DEIK Turkey-Kazakhstan Business Council.

== Recognition ==
In 2016, Şener was awarded the Legion d'honneur by the President of the Republic of France François Hollande, due to his contributions to the relations between Turkey and France and he was given the High Honour of Service by the Georgian state.

In 2019 he was honored with Medal of Merit for Macedonia Republic for the improvement of business and commercial relations in Macedonia and Turkey.

In the voting carried out by Thomson Extel among national and international finance corporations, he was chosen first in the category of “The Best CEO” in Turkey in 2010, 2011, 2014, 2015 and 2016, and third in the European Transport Sector in 2014.
