= Atatürk Airport National Garden =

Urban park in Istanbul, Turkey

- Atatürk Havalimanı Millet Bahçesi
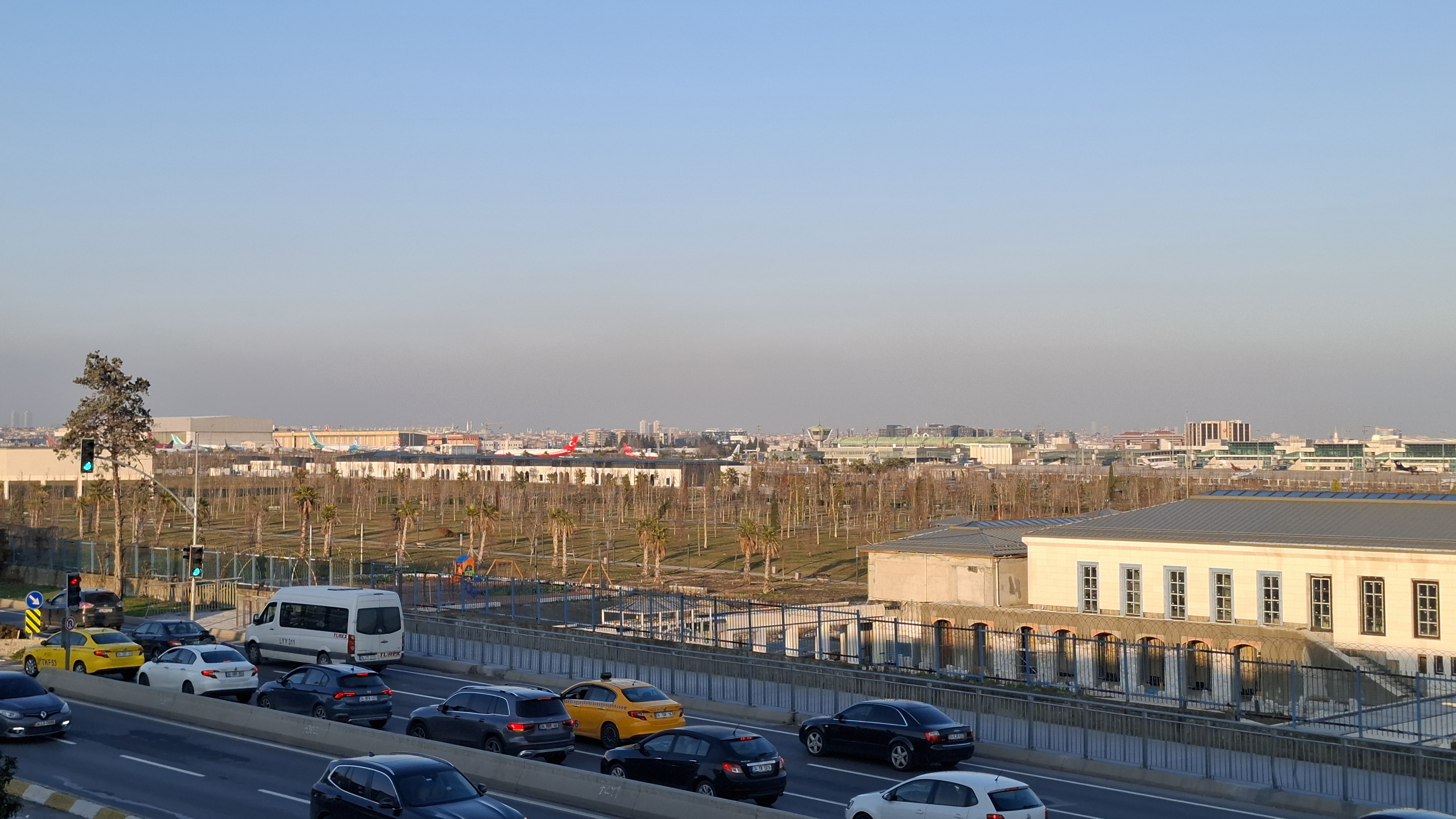
- Interactive map of Atatürk Airport National Garden
- Type: Urban park
- Location: Bakırköy, Istanbul, Turkey
- Coordinates: 40.9852°N 28.8084°W
- Area: 1.2 km^{2} (0.46 sq mi)
- Opened: 1 November 2025
- Operator: Ministry of Environment, Urbanization and Climate Change (TOKİ)
- Status: Under construction

Atatürk Airport National Garden (Atatürk Havalimanı Millet Bahçesi) is a large urban park in the Bakırköy district of Istanbul, Turkey. It was developed on the former site of Atatürk Airport, which closed in 2019 after the opening of the new Istanbul Airport. The project forms part of the Turkish government's nationwide "Nation's Gardens" (Millet Bahçeleri) initiative to expand public green space.

== History ==
The site originally served as Atatürk Airport, Istanbul's primary international airport for several decades. On 7 April 2019, commercial flight operations were transferred to the newly built Istanbul Airport, leaving the former airport complex largely unused.

In 2022, the Turkish government announced a major redevelopment plan to convert the airport grounds into a national garden. The Housing Development Administration of Türkiye (TOKİ) oversaw the project, which included demolition of certain airport structures and extensive landscaping. A tender for construction was held in April 2022.

The project experienced political and legal debate, including a ruling by the Council of State (Danıştay) challenging aspects of the tender process. Despite these issues, construction continued in phases. The first phase, consisting of nearly 500,000 m^{2} of green space, was completed in 2023.

Atatürk Airport National Garden officially opened on 1 November 2025 with a public ceremony attended by national and local officials.

== Design and features ==
At 1.2 million square meters, Atatürk Airport National Garden is one of the largest public parks in Türkiye. The design includes:

- Over 20,000 newly planted trees and more than 1 million m^{2} of lawn.
- A 2.5 km artificial watercourse known as the Ab-ı Hayat stream.
- Nine main entrances distributed around the former airfield.
- Seven landscaped hills symbolizing historical districts of Istanbul, including Sarayburnu, Süleymaniye, Edirnekapı, and Çemberlitaş.
- An array of recreational facilities, including walking and cycling paths, tennis courts, football pitches, basketball courts, playgrounds, and skating areas.
- Social facilities such as exhibition halls, a public library, workshops, a soup kitchen, a marketplace, and food venues.

== Disaster preparedness ==
The park is designed to function as a large-scale disaster assembly and emergency response area. Its extensive open spaces and supporting infrastructure, including hangar buildings, water reservoirs, cooking facilities, sanitary units, and renewable energy systems powered by wind and solar installations, enable it to accommodate more than 165,000 people simultaneously in the event of a major emergency, reflecting Istanbul's seismic risk and national disaster-management planning.

== Sustainability ==
Sustainability features of the garden include:

- On-site solar and wind power generation,
- Water reservoirs and irrigation recycling systems,
- Preservation and transplantation of mature trees,
- Use of local plant species throughout the landscape.

== See also ==
- Atatürk Arboretum
- Istanbul Airport
- Atatürk Airport
