= Sezer Şener Komsuoğlu =

Turkish physician

Sezer Şener Komsuoğlu (born 1949) is a Turkish neurologist. She was the rector of Kocaeli University between 2006 and 2014.

== Biography ==
Komsuoğlu was born in 1949 in Trabzon. She graduated from the Atatürk Girls' High School and studied medicine at Atatürk University, graduating in 1974. She specialised in neurology at Ankara University and Hacettepe University between 1974 and 1978 and completed her PhD at the University of Birmingham in 1981. She helped with the foundation of the Karadeniz Technical University Faculty of Medicine and was the Educational Coordinator of Neurology between 1982 and 1992. She became a docent in 1982 and a professor in 1988. In 1995, she moved to Kocaeli to help the establishment of the new medical faculty there and became the head of neurology and internal medicine. She was chosen as the rector of the university in 2006.

Komsuoğlu's principal areas of research are epilepsy and electroencephalography, but she has also undertaken research about action potentials. She has written 44 articles published in journals listed in the Science Citation Index, including publications in the European Heart Journal and European Journal of Neurology. She has 63 other articles published in scientific journals.

She was married to Baki Komsuoğlu, the rector of Kocaeli University before her.
