= List of the busiest airports in Europe (2010–2015) =

These are lists of the busiest airports in Europe from 2010 to 2015, based on various ranking criteria.

== 2015 ==
Rank 2015	Country	Airport	City	Passengers 2014	Passengers 2015	Change 2014–2015
1	United Kingdom	Heathrow Airport	London	73,405,330	74,985,475	▲2.2%
2	France	Charles de Gaulle Airport	Paris	63,813,756	65,766,986	▲3.1%
3	Turkey	Istanbul Atatürk Airport	Istanbul	56,695,166	61,332,124	▲8.2%
4	Germany	Frankfurt Airport	Frankfurt	59,566,132	61,032,022	▲2.5%
5	Netherlands	Amsterdam Airport Schiphol	Amsterdam	54,978,023	58,284,848	▲6.0%
6	Spain	Adolfo Suárez Madrid–Barajas Airport	Madrid	41,833,686	46,824,838	▲11.9%
7	Germany	Munich Airport	Munich	39,700,515	40,981,522	▲3.2%
8	Italy	Leonardo da Vinci–Fiumicino Airport	Rome	38,506,908	40,463,208	▲5.1%
9	United Kingdom	Gatwick Airport	London	38,103,667	40,269,087	▲5.7%
10	Spain	Barcelona–El Prat Josep Tarradellas Airport	Barcelona	37,558,981	39,711,237	▲5.7%
11	Russia	Sheremetyevo International Airport	Moscow	31,259,662	31,302,068	▲0.1%
12	Russia	Domodedovo International Airport	Moscow	33,039,531	30,504,515	▼7.7%
13	France	Paris-Orly Airport	Paris	28,862,586	29,664,993	▲2.8%
14	Denmark	Copenhagen Airport	Copenhagen	25,627,093	26,610,332	▲3.8%
15	Switzerland	Zurich Airport	Zürich	25,477,622	26,281,228	▲3.2%
16	Ireland	Dublin Airport	Dublin	21,711,967	25,049,319	▲15.4%
17	Norway	Oslo Airport	Oslo	24,269,235	24,678,195	▲1.7%
18	Spain	Palma de Mallorca Airport	Palma de Mallorca	23,115,622	23,745,023	▲2.7%
19	Belgium	Brussels Airport	Brussels	21,933,190	23,460,018	▲7.0%
20	Sweden	Stockholm-Arlanda Airport	Stockholm	22,419,739	23,142,536	▲3.2%
21	United Kingdom	Manchester Airport	Manchester	21,989,682	23,136,047	▲5.2%
22	Austria	Vienna International Airport	Vienna	22,483,158	22,775,054	▲1.3%
23	United Kingdom	London Stansted Airport	London	19,965,093	22,519,178	▲12.8%
24	Germany	Düsseldorf Airport	Düsseldorf	21,850,489	22,476,685	▲2.9%
25	Germany	Berlin Tegel Airport	Berlin	20,688,016	21,005,196	▲1.5%
26	Portugal	Lisbon Portela Airport	Lisbon	18,142,035	20,090,418	▲10.7%
27	Italy	Malpensa Airport	Milan	18,853,203	18,582,043	▼1.4%
28	Greece	Athens International Airport	Athens	15,196,369	18,087,377	▲19.0%
29	Finland	Helsinki Airport	Helsinki	15,948,760	16,422,266	▲3.0%
30	Russia	Vnukovo International Airport	Moscow	12,733,118	15,815,129	▲24.2%
31	Switzerland	Geneva International Airport	Geneva	15,152,927	15,772,081	▲4.1%
32	Germany	Hamburg Airport	Hamburg	14,760,280	15,610,072	▲5.8%
33	Spain	Málaga Airport	Málaga	13,748,976	14,404,206	▲4.8%
34	Russia	Pulkovo Airport	Saint Petersburg	14,264,732	13,501,454	▼5.4%
35	United Kingdom	London Luton Airport	London	10,484,938	12,263,505	▲17.0%
36	Czech Republic	Václav Havel Airport Prague	Prague	11,149,926	12,030,928	▲7.9%
37	France	Nice Côte d'Azur Airport	Nice	11,660,208	12,016,730	▲3.1%
38	Poland	Frederic Chopin Airport	Warsaw	10,574,539	11,186,688	▲6.0%
39	United Kingdom	Edinburgh Airport	Edinburgh	10,160,004	11,114,587	▲9.4%
40	Spain	Alicante Airport	Alicante	10,066,067	10,575,288	▲5.1%
41	Germany	Stuttgart Airport	Stuttgart	9,718,438	10,512,225	▲8.2%
42	Italy	Orio al Serio Airport	Milan / Bergamo	8,774,256	10,404,625	▲18.6%
43	Germany	Cologne Bonn Airport	Cologne / Bonn	9,450,493	10,338,375	▲9.4%
44	Hungary	Budapest Liszt Ferenc International Airport	Budapest	9,155,161	10,298,963	▲12.5%
45	United Kingdom	Birmingham Airport	Birmingham	9,705,955	10,187,122	▲5.0%
46	Italy	Linate Airport	Milan	9,025,978	9,689,635	▲7.4%
47	Romania	Henri Coandă International Airport	Bucharest	8,317,168	9,274,629	▲11.6%
48	Italy	Venice Marco Polo Airport	Venice	8,475,188	8,751,028	▲3.3%
49	United Kingdom	Glasgow Airport	Glasgow	7,715,988	8,714,154	▲12.9%
50	France	Lyon-Saint Exupéry Airport	Lyon	8,467,093	8,703,354	▲2.8%
51	Germany	Berlin Schönefeld Airport	Berlin	7,292,517	8,526,268	▲16.9%
52	France	Marseille Provence Airport	Marseille	8,182,237	8,261,804	▲1.0%
53	Portugal	Francisco de Sá Carneiro Airport	Porto	6,930,270	8,087,740	▲16.7%
54	France	Blagnac Airport	Toulouse	7,517,736	7,669,054	▲2.0%
55	Ukraine	Boryspil International Airport	Kyiv	6,890,443	7,277,135	▲5.6%
56	Italy	Catania-Fontanarossa Airport	Catania	7,304,012	7,105,487	▼2.7%
57	France; Switzerland; Germany	EuroAirport Basel-Mulhouse-Freiburg	Basel / Mulhouse / Freiburg im Breisgau	6,523,874	7,061,059	▲8.2%
58	Belgium	Brussels South Charleroi Airport	Charleroi	6,439,957	6,956,302	▲8.0%
59	Italy	Bologna Airport	Bologna	6,580,389	6,889,742	▲4.7%
60	United Kingdom	Bristol Airport	Bristol	6,339,805	6,786,790	▲7.1%
61	Spain	Ibiza Airport	Ibiza	6,212,198	6,477,283	▲4.3%
62	Portugal	Faro Airport	Faro	6,166,927	6,436,881	▲4.4%
63	Italy	Naples Airport	Naples	5,960,035	6,163,188	▲3.4%
64	Sweden	Göteborg Landvetter Airport	Gothenburg	5,207,737	6,158,334	▲18.3%
65	Greece	Heraklion International Airport	Heraklion	6,024,958	6,057,355	▲0.5%
66	Norway	Bergen Airport, Flesland	Bergen	6,216,841	6,020,866	▼3.2%
67	Italy	Rome Ciampino Airport	Rome	5,018,289	5,834,201	▲16.3%
68	Germany	Langenhagen Airport	Hanover	5,291,882	5,452,669	▲3.0%
69	Greece	Thessaloniki International Airport, "Macedonia"	Thessaloniki	4,950,726	5,341,293	▲7.9%
70	France	Bordeaux - Mérignac Airport	Bordeaux	4,945,029	5,323,294	▲7.6%
71	Latvia	Riga International Airport	Riga	4,813,959	5,162,149	▲7.2%
72	Spain	Valencia Airport	Valencia	4,597,095	5,055,127	▲10.0%
73	Russia; Ukraine (Note: Crimea is illegally occupied by Russia since March 2014; and is recognized by a majority of countries as a territory of Ukraine. Simferopol airport is closed by Ukrainian authorities. Any services currently performed by the airport are in violation of international law.)	Simferopol International Airport	Simferopol	2,685,269	5,017,758	▲86.9%
74	Italy	Falcone–Borsellino Airport	Palermo	4,569,550	4,910,791	▲7.5%
75	Iceland	Keflavík International Airport	Reykjavík	3,867,425	4,855,505	▲25.5%
76	Italy	Galileo Galilei Airport	Pisa	4,683,811	4,804,774	▲2.6%
77	Serbia	Belgrade Nikola Tesla Airport	Belgrade	4,638,577	4,776,110	▲3.0%
78	Malta	Malta International Airport	Malta	4,290,380	4,618,642	▲7.7%
79	Greece	Rhodes International Airport	Rhodes	4,552,056	4,579,023	▲0.6%
80	United Kingdom	Newcastle Airport	Newcastle upon Tyne	4,516,739	4,562,846	▲1.0%
81	Norway	Stavanger Airport, Sola	Stavanger	4,721,970	4,501,368	▼4.7%
82	United Kingdom	East Midlands Airport	Derby / Leicester / Nottingham	4,510,544	4,450,862	▼1.3%
83	France	Nantes Atlantique Airport	Nantes	4,157,284	4,394,996	▲5.7%
84	United Kingdom	Belfast International Airport	Belfast	4,033,954	4,391,292	▲8.9%
85	Netherlands	Eindhoven Airport	Eindhoven	3,956,364	4,373,882	▲10.6%
86	Norway	Trondheim Airport, Værnes	Trondheim	4,416,681	4,352,721	▼1.4%
87	France	Beauvais-Tillé Airport	Beauvais	4,024,201	4,330,019	▲7.6%
88	United Kingdom	London City Airport	London	3,647,824	4,319,301	▲18.4%
89	Spain	San Pablo Airport	Seville	3,885,434	4,308,845	▲10.9%
90	United Kingdom	Liverpool Airport	Liverpool	3,986,654	4,301,495	▲7.9%
91	Spain	Bilbao Airport	Bilbao	4,015,350	4,277,725	▲6.5%
92	Poland	Kraków Airport	Kraków	3,819,825	4,308,845	▲10.5%
93	Bulgaria	Sofia Airport	Sofia	3,815,192	4,088,943	▲7.2%
94	Italy	Bari Airport	Bari	3,968,917	3,674,028	▲8%
95	Spain	Tenerife North Airport	Tenerife	3,815,192	4,088,943	▲7.2%
96	Italy	Cagliari Airport	Cagliari	3,714,174	3,633,750	▲2.2%

== 2014 ==
Rank 2014	Country	Airport	City	Passengers 2013	Passengers 2014	Change 2013–2014
1	United Kingdom	London-Heathrow Airport	London	72,367,054	73,405,330	▲1.4%
2	France	Paris-Charles de Gaulle Airport	Paris	62,052,917	63,813,756	▲2.8%
3	Germany	Frankfurt Airport	Frankfurt	58,036,948	59,566,132	▲2.6%
4	Turkey	Istanbul Atatürk Airport	Istanbul	51,297,790	56,695,166	▲10.5%
5	Netherlands	Amsterdam Airport Schiphol	Amsterdam	52,569,250	54,978,023	▲4.6%
6	Spain	Adolfo Suárez Madrid–Barajas Airport	Madrid	39,735,618	41,833,686	▲5.3%
7	Germany	Munich Airport	Munich	38,672,644	39,700,515	▲2.7%
8	Italy	Leonardo da Vinci–Fiumicino Airport	Rome	36,166,345	38,506,908	▲6.5%
9	United Kingdom	Gatwick Airport	London	35,444,206	38,103,667	▲7.5%
10	Spain	Barcelona–El Prat Josep Tarradellas Airport	Barcelona	35,216,828	37,558,981	▲6.7%
11	Russia	Domodedovo International Airport	Moscow	30,765,078	33,039,531	▲7.4%
12	Russia	Sheremetyevo International Airport	Moscow	29,256,226	31,259,662	▲6.8%
13	France	Paris-Orly Airport	Paris	28,274,154	28,862,586	▲2.1%
14	Denmark	Copenhagen Airport	Copenhagen	24,067,030	25,627,093	▲6.5%
15	Switzerland	Zurich Airport	Zürich	24,865,138	25,477,622	▲2.5%
16	Norway	Oslo Airport	Oslo	22,956,540	24,269,235	▲5.7%
17	Spain	Palma de Mallorca Airport	Palma de Mallorca	22,768,032	23,115,622	▲1.5%
18	Austria	Vienna International Airport	Vienna	21,999,926	22,483,158	▲2.2%
19	Sweden	Stockholm-Arlanda Airport	Stockholm	20,681,554	22,419,739	▲8.6%
20	United Kingdom	Manchester Airport	Manchester	20,751,581	21,989,682	▲6.0%
21	Belgium	Brussels Airport	Brussels	19,133,222	21,933,190	▲14.6%
22	Germany	Düsseldorf Airport	Düsseldorf	21,228,226	21,850,489	▲2.9%
23	Ireland	Dublin Airport	Dublin	20,166,783	21,711,967	▲7.7%
24	Germany	Berlin Tegel Airport	Berlin	19,591,838	20,688,016	▲5.6%
25	United Kingdom	London Stansted Airport	London	17,852,393	19,965,093	▲11.8%
26	Italy	Malpensa Airport	Milan	17,955,075	18,853,203	▲5.0%
27	Portugal	Lisbon Portela Airport	Lisbon	16,008,848	18,142,035	▲13.3%
28	Finland	Helsinki-Vantaa Airport	Helsinki	15,278,994	15,948,760	▲4.4%
29	Greece	Athens International Airport	Athens	12,536,057	15,196,369	▲21.2%
30	Switzerland	Geneva International Airport	Geneva	14,436,149	15,152,927	▲5.0%
31	Germany	Hamburg Airport	Hamburg	13,502,553	14,760,280	▲9.3%
32	Russia	Pulkovo Airport	Saint Petersburg	12,854,366	14,264,732	▲11.0%
33	Spain	Málaga Airport	Málaga	12,925,186	13,748,976	▲6.4%
34	Russia	Vnukovo International Airport	Moscow	11,175,583	12,733,118	▲13.9%
35	France	Nice Côte d'Azur Airport	Nice	11,554,195	11,660,208	▲0.9%
36	Czech Republic	Václav Havel Airport Prague	Prague	10,974,196	11,149,926	▲1.6%
37	Poland	Frederic Chopin Airport	Warsaw	10,669,879	10,574,539	▼0.9%
38	United Kingdom	London Luton Airport	London	9,697,944	10,484,938	▲8.1%
39	United Kingdom	Edinburgh Airport	Edinburgh	9,775,443	10,160,004	▲3.9%
40	Spain	Alicante Airport	Alicante	9,638,835	10,066,067	▲4.4%
41	Germany	Stuttgart Airport	Stuttgart	9,577,551	9,718,438	▲1.5%
42	United Kingdom	Birmingham Airport	Birmingham	9,120,201	9,705,955	▲6.4%
43	Germany	Cologne Bonn Airport	Cologne / Bonn	9,077,346	9,450,493	▲4.1%
44	Hungary	Budapest Liszt Ferenc International Airport	Budapest	8,520,880	9,155,161	▲7.4%
45	Italy	Linate Airport	Milan	9,034,373	9,025,978	▼0.0%
46	Italy	Orio al Serio Airport	Milan / Bergamo	8,964,376	8,774,256	▼2.1%
47	Italy	Venice Marco Polo Airport	Venice	8,403,790	8,475,188	▲0.8%
48	France	Lyon-Saint Exupéry Airport	Lyon	8,562,298	8,467,093	▼1.1%
49	Romania	Henri Coandă International Airport	Bucharest	7,643,467	8,317,168	▲8.8%
50	France	Marseille Provence Airport	Marseille	8,260,619	8,182,237	▼0.9%
51	United Kingdom	Glasgow Airport	Glasgow	7,363,764	7,715,988	▲4.8%
52	France	Blagnac Airport	Toulouse	7,567,634	7,517,736	▼0.7%
53	Italy	Catania-Fontanarossa Airport	Catania	6,400,127	7,304,012	▲14.1%
54	Germany	Berlin Schönefeld Airport	Berlin	6,727,306	7,292,517	▲8.4%
55	Portugal	Francisco de Sá Carneiro Airport	Porto	6,372,801	6,930,270	▲8.7%
56	Ukraine	Boryspil International Airport	Kyiv	7,926,964	6,890,443	▼13.1%
57	Italy	Bologna Airport	Bologna	6,193,783	6,580,389	▲6.2%
58	France; Switzerland; Germany	EuroAirport Basel-Mulhouse-Freiburg	Basel / Mulhouse / Freiburg im Breisgau	5,880,771	6,523,874	▲10.9%
59	Belgium	Brussels South Charleroi Airport	Charleroi	6,786,979	6,439,957	▼5.1%
60	United Kingdom	Bristol Airport	Bristol	6,131,896	6,339,805	▲3.4%
61	Norway	Bergen Airport, Flesland	Bergen	6,213,960	6,216,841	▲0.0%
62	Spain	Ibiza Airport	Ibiza	5,726,579	6,212,198	▲8.5%
63	Portugal	Faro Airport	Faro	5,981,448	6,166,927	▲3.1%
64	Greece	Heraklion International Airport	Heraklion	5,778,764	6,024,958	▲4.2%
65	Italy	Naples Airport	Naples	5,444,422	5,960,035	▲9.5%
66	Spain	Lanzarote Airport	Lanzarote	5,334,599	5,882,691	▲10.3%
67	Germany	Langenhagen Airport	Hanover	5,234,909	5,291,882	▲1.1%
68	Sweden	Göteborg Landvetter Airport	Gothenburg	5,004,093	5,207,737	▲4.1%
69	Italy	Rome Ciampino Airport	Rome	4,749,251	5,018,289	▲5.7%
70	Greece	Thessaloniki International Airport, "Macedonia"	Thessaloniki	4,039,576	4,950,726	▲22.6%
71	France	Bordeaux - Mérignac Airport	Bordeaux	4,617,608	4,945,029	▲7.1%
72	Latvia	Riga International Airport	Riga	4,793,045	4,813,959	▲0.4%
73	Norway	Stavanger Airport, Sola	Stavanger	4,668,403	4,721,970	▲0.3%
74	Italy	Galileo Galilei Airport	Pisa	4,479,690	4,683,811	▲4.6%
75	Serbia	Belgrade Nikola Tesla Airport	Belgrade	3,543,194	4,638,577	▲30.9%
76	Spain	Valencia Airport	Valencia	4,618,072	4,597,095	▼0.5%
77	Italy	Falcone–Borsellino Airport	Palermo	4,349,672	4,569,550	▲5.1%
78	Greece	Rhodes International Airport	Rhodes	4,200,059	4,552,056	▲8.3%
79	United Kingdom	Newcastle Airport	Newcastle upon Tyne	4,420,839	4,516,739	▲2.2%
80	United Kingdom	East Midlands Airport	Derby / Leicester / Nottingham	4,334,117	4,510,544	▲4.1%
81	Norway	Trondheim Airport, Værnes	Trondheim	4,311,328	4,416,681	▲1.4%
82	Malta	Malta International Airport	Malta	4,031,500	4,290,380	▲6.4%
83	France	Nantes Atlantique Airport	Nantes	3,930,849	4,157,284	▲5.8%
84	United Kingdom	Belfast International Airport	Belfast	4,023,336	4,033,954	▲0.3%
85	France	Beauvais-Tillé Airport	Beauvais	3,952,908	4,024,201	▲1.8%
86	Spain	Bilbao Airport	Bilbao	3,800,774	4,015,350	▲5.6%
87	United Kingdom	Liverpool John Lennon Airport	Liverpool	4,187,493	3,986,654	▼4.8%
88	Russia	Tolmachevo Airport	Novosibirsk	3,748,211	3,957,667	▲5.6%
89	Netherlands	Eindhoven Airport	Eindhoven	3,425,485	3,956,364	▲15.5%
90	Spain	San Pablo Airport	Seville	3,687,714	3,885,434	▲5.4%
91	Iceland	Keflavík International Airport	Reykjavík	3,209,848	3,867,425	▲20.5%
92	Poland	Kraków Airport	Kraków	3,636,804	3,819,825	▲5.0%
93	Bulgaria	Sofia Airport	Sofia	3,504,320	3,815,232	▲8.9%
94	United Kingdom	Aberdeen Airport	Aberdeen	3,440,765	3,723,662	▲8.2%
95	Italy	Bari Airport	Bari	3,599,910	3,677,160	▲2.1%

== 2013 ==
Rank 2013	Country	Airport	City	Passengers 2012	Passengers 2013	Change 2012–2013
1	United Kingdom	London Heathrow Airport	London	70,037,417	72,367,054	▲3.3%
2	France	Paris-Charles de Gaulle Airport	Paris	61,611,934	62,052,917	▲0.7%
3	Germany	Frankfurt Airport	Frankfurt	57,520,001	58,036,948	▲0.9%
4	Netherlands	Amsterdam Airport Schiphol	Amsterdam	51,035,590	52,569,250	▲3.0%
5	Turkey	Istanbul Atatürk Airport	Istanbul	45,091,962	51,297,790	▲13.8%
6	Spain	Barajas Airport	Madrid	45,190,528	39,735,618	▼12.1%
7	Germany	Munich Airport	Munich	38,360,604	38,672,644	▲0.8%
8	Italy	Leonardo da Vinci–Fiumicino Airport	Rome	36,980,911	36,166,345	▼2.2%
9	United Kingdom	Gatwick Airport	London	34,235,982	35,444,206	▲3.5%
10	Spain	Barcelona–El Prat Josep Tarradellas Airport	Barcelona	35,144,503	35,216,828	▲0.2%
11	Russia	Domodedovo International Airport	Moscow	28,165,657	30,765,078	▲9.2%
12	Russia	Sheremetyevo International Airport	Moscow	26,032,975	29,256,226	▲11.7%
13	France	Paris-Orly Airport	Paris	27,232,263	28,274,154	▲3.8%
14	Switzerland	Zurich Airport	Zürich	24,802,466	24,865,138	▲0.3%
15	Denmark	Copenhagen Airport	Copenhagen	23,336,187	24,067,030	▲3.1%
16	Norway	Oslo Airport	Oslo	22,080,433	22,956,540	▲4.0%
17	Spain	Palma de Mallorca Airport	Palma de Mallorca	22,666,858	22,768,032	▲0.4%
18	Austria	Vienna International Airport	Vienna	22,165,794	21,999,926	▼0.7%
19	Germany	Düsseldorf Airport	Düsseldorf	20,833,246	21,228,226	▲1.9%
20	United Kingdom	Manchester Airport	Manchester	19,736,502	20,751,581	▲5.1%
21	Sweden	Stockholm-Arlanda Airport	Stockholm	19,642,029	20,681,554	▲5.3%
22	Ireland	Dublin Airport	Dublin	19,099,649	20,166,783	▲5.7%
23	Germany	Berlin Tegel Airport	Berlin	18,164,203	19,591,838	▲7.9%
24	Belgium	Brussels Airport	Brussels	18,971,332	19,133,222	▲0.9%
25	Italy	Malpensa Airport	Milan	18,537,301	17,955,075	▼3.1%
26	United Kingdom	London Stansted Airport	London	17,472,699	17,852,393	▲2.2%
27	Portugal	Lisbon Portela Airport	Lisbon	15,301,176	16,008,848	▲4.6%
28	Finland	Helsinki-Vantaa Airport	Helsinki	14,858,215	15,278,994	▲2.8%
29	Switzerland	Geneva International Airport	Geneva	13,899,422	14,436,149	▲3.9%
30	Germany	Hamburg Airport	Hamburg	13,697,402	13,502,553	▼1.4%
31	Spain	Málaga Airport	Málaga	12,581,944	12,925,186	▲2.7%
32	Russia	Pulkovo Airport	Saint Petersburg	11,154,560	12,854,366	▲15.2%
33	Greece	Athens International Airport	Athens	12,944,041	12,536,057	▼3.2%
34	France	Nice Côte d'Azur Airport	Nice	11,189,896	11,554,195	▲3.2%
35	Russia	Vnukovo International Airport	Moscow	9,699,452	11,175,142	▲15.2%
36	Czech Republic	Václav Havel Airport Prague	Prague	10,807,890	10,974,196	▲1.5%
37	Poland	Frederic Chopin Airport	Warsaw	9,585,532	10,669,879	▲11.3%
38	United Kingdom	Edinburgh Airport	Edinburgh	9,195,061	9,775,443	▲6.3%
39	United Kingdom	London Luton Airport	London	9,617,697	9,697,944	▲0.8%
40	Spain	Alicante Airport	Alicante	8,855,444	9,638,835	▲8.8%
41	Germany	Stuttgart Airport	Stuttgart	9,720,877	9,577,551	▼1.5%
42	United Kingdom	Birmingham Airport	Birmingham	8,922,539	9,120,201	▲2.2%
43	Germany	Cologne Bonn Airport	Cologne / Bonn	9,280,070	9,077,346	▼2.2%
44	Italy	Linate Airport	Milan	9,229,890	9,034,373	▼2.1%
45	Italy	Orio al Serio Airport	Milan / Bergamo	8,890,720	8,964,376	▲0.8%
46	France	Lyon-Saint Exupéry Airport	Lyon	8,451,039	8,562,298	▲1.3%
47	Hungary	Budapest Liszt Ferenc International Airport	Budapest	8,504,020	8,520,880	▲0.2%
48	Italy	Venice Marco Polo Airport	Venice	8,188,455	8,403,790	▲2.6%
49	France	Marseille Provence Airport	Marseille	8,295,479	8,260,619	▼0.4%
50	Ukraine	Boryspil International Airport	Kyiv	8,478,091	7,926,964	▼6.5%
51	Romania	Henri Coandă International Airport	Bucharest	7,120,024	7,643,467	▲7.3%
52	France	Blagnac Airport	Toulouse	7,559,350	7,567,634	▲0.1%
53	United Kingdom	Glasgow Airport	Glasgow	7,157,859	7,363,764	▲2.9%
54	Belgium	Brussels South Charleroi Airport	Charleroi	6,516,427	6,786,979	▲4.0%
55	Germany	Berlin Schönefeld Airport	Berlin	7,097,274	6,727,306	▼5.2%
56	Italy	Catania-Fontanarossa Airport	Catania	6,246,888	6,400,127	▲2.5%
57	Portugal	Francisco de Sá Carneiro Airport	Porto	6,050,094	6,372,801	▲5.3%
58	Norway	Bergen Airport, Flesland	Bergen	5,814,413	6,213,960	▲6.9%
59	Italy	Bologna Airport	Bologna	5,958,648	6,193,783	▲4.0%
60	United Kingdom	Bristol Airport	Bristol	5,921,530	6,131,896	▲3.6%
61	Portugal	Faro Airport	Faro	5,672,377	5,981,448	▲5.4%
62	France; Switzerland; Germany	EuroAirport Basel-Mulhouse-Freiburg	Basel / Mulhouse / Freiburg im Breisgau	5,354,674	5,880,771	▲9.8%
63	Greece	Heraklion International Airport	Heraklion	5,052,043	5,778,764	▲14.4%
64	Spain	Ibiza Airport	Ibiza	5,555,048	5,726,579	▲3.1%
65	Italy	Naples Airport	Naples	5,801,836	5,444,422	▼6.2%
66	Germany	Langenhagen Airport	Hanover	5,287,831	5,234,909	▼1.0%
67	Sweden	Göteborg Landvetter Airport	Gothenburg	4,854,888	5,004,093	▲3.1%
68	Latvia	Riga International Airport	Riga	4,767,764	4,793,045	▲0.5%
69	Italy	Rome Ciampino Airport	Rome	4,497,376	4,749,251	▲5.6%
70	Norway	Stavanger Airport, Sola	Stavanger	4,413,987	4,668,403	▲5.8%
71	Spain	Valencia Airport	Valencia	4,752,020	4,618,072	▼2.8%
72	France	Bordeaux - Mérignac Airport	Bordeaux	4,380,145	4,617,608	▲4.3%
73	Italy	Galileo Galilei Airport	Pisa	4,494,915	4,479,690	▼0.3%
74	United Kingdom	Newcastle Airport	Newcastle upon Tyne	4,366,196	4,420,839	▲1.3%
75	Italy	Falcone–Borsellino Airport	Palermo	4,608,533	4,349,672	▼5.6%
76	United Kingdom	East Midlands Airport	Derby / Leicester / Nottingham	4,076,178	4,334,117	▲6.3%
77	Norway	Trondheim Airport, Værnes	Trondheim	4,160,162	4,311,328	▲3.6%
78	Greece	Rhodes International Airport	Rhodes	3,813,947	4,200,059	▲10.1%
79	United Kingdom	Liverpool John Lennon Airport	Liverpool	4,463,257	4,187,493	▼6.2%
80	Malta	Malta International Airport	Malta	3,649,938	4,031,500	▲10.9%
81	Greece	Thessaloniki International Airport, "Macedonia"	Thessaloniki	4,006,204	4,039,576	▲0.8%
82	United Kingdom	Belfast International Airport	Belfast	4,313,685	4,023,336	▼6.7%
83	France	Beauvais-Tillé Airport	Beauvais	3,862,431	3,952,908	▲2.3%
84	France	Nantes Atlantique Airport	Nantes	3,631,693	3,930,849	▲8.2%
85	Spain	Bilbao Airport	Bilbao	4,171,065	3,800,774	▼8.9%
86	Spain	San Pablo Airport	Seville	4,292,020	3,687,714	▼14.1%
87	Poland	Kraków Airport	Kraków	3,438,758	3,636,804	▲5.8%
88	Italy	Bari Airport	Bari	3,780,112	3,599,910	▼4.8%
89	Italy	Cagliari-Elmas Airport	Cagliari	3,592,020	3,587,907	▼0.1%
90	Serbia	Belgrade Nikola Tesla Airport	Belgrade	3,363,919	3,543,194	▲5.3%
91	Bulgaria	Sofia Airport	Sofia	3,467,455	3,504,320	▲1.1%
92	United Kingdom	Aberdeen Airport	Aberdeen	3,330,126	3,440,765	▲3.3%

== 2012 ==
Rank 2012	Country	Airport	City	Passengers 2011	Passengers 2012	Change 2011–2012
1	United Kingdom	London Heathrow Airport	London	69,433,230	70,037,417	▲0.9%
2	France	Paris-Charles de Gaulle Airport	Paris	60,970,551	61,611,934	▲1.1%
3	Germany	Frankfurt Airport	Frankfurt	56,436,255	57,520,001	▲1.9%
4	Netherlands	Amsterdam Airport Schiphol	Amsterdam	49,755,252	51,035,590	▲2.6%
5	Spain	Madrid–Barajas Airport	Madrid	49,671,270	45,190,528	▼9.0%
6	Turkey	Atatürk International Airport	Istanbul	37,394,694	45,091,962	▲20.6%
7	Germany	Munich Airport	Munich	37,763,701	38,360,604	▲1.6%
8	Italy	Leonardo da Vinci-Fiumicino Airport	Rome	37,651,700	36,980,911	▼1.8%
9	Spain	Barcelona–El Prat Josep Tarradellas Airport	Barcelona	34,398,226	35,144,503	▲2.2%
10	United Kingdom	London Gatwick Airport	London	33,674,264	34,235,982	▲1.7%
11	Russia	Domodedovo International Airport	Moscow	25,701,610	28,165,657	▲9.6%
12	France	Paris-Orly Airport	Paris	27,139,076	27,232,263	▲0.3%
13	Russia	Sheremetyevo International Airport	Moscow	22,351,317	26,032,975	▲16.5%
14	Switzerland	Zurich Airport	Zürich	24,337,954	24,802,466	▲1.9%
15	Denmark	Copenhagen Airport	Copenhagen	22,725,517	23,336,187	▲2.7%
16	Spain	Palma de Mallorca Airport	Palma de Mallorca	22,726,707	22,666,858	▼0.3%
17	Austria	Vienna International Airport	Vienna	21,106,292	22,165,794	▲5.0%
18	Norway	Oslo Airport	Oslo	21,103,623	22,080,433	▲4.6%
19	Germany	Düsseldorf Airport	Düsseldorf	20,339,466	20,833,246	▲2.4%
20	United Kingdom	Manchester Airport	Manchester	18,892,756	19,736,502	▲4.5%
21	Sweden	Stockholm-Arlanda Airport	Stockholm	19,069,065	19,642,029	▲3.0%
22	Ireland	Dublin Airport	Dublin	18,740,953	19,099,649	▲1.9%
23	Belgium	Brussels Airport	Brussels	18,786,034	18,971,332	▲1.0%
24	Italy	Malpensa Airport	Milan	19,303,131	18,537,301	▼4.0%
25	Germany	Berlin Tegel Airport	Berlin	16,919,820	18,164,203	▲7.4%
26	United Kingdom	London Stansted Airport	London	18,052,843	17,472,699	▼3.2%
27	Portugal	Lisbon Portela Airport	Lisbon	14,790,242	15,301,176	▲3.5%
28	Finland	Helsinki Airport	Helsinki	14,865,871	14,858,215	▼0.1%
29	Switzerland	Geneva International Airport	Geneva	13,111,741	13,899,422	▲5.9%
30	Germany	Hamburg Airport	Hamburg	13,558,261	13,697,402	▲1.0%
31	Greece	Athens International Airport	Athens	14,446,971	12,944,041	▼10.4%
32	Spain	Málaga Airport	Málaga	12,823,117	12,581,944	▼1.9%
33	France	Nice Côte d'Azur Airport	Nice	10,422,073	11,189,896	▲7.4%
34	Russia	Pulkovo Airport	Saint Petersburg	9,610,767	11,154,560	▲16.1%
35	Czech Republic	Václav Havel Airport Prague	Prague	11,788,629	10,807,890	▼8.3%
36	Germany	Stuttgart Airport	Stuttgart	9,582,265	9,720,877	▲1.4%
37	Russia	Vnukovo International Airport	Moscow	8,197,162	9,699,452	▲18.3%
38	United Kingdom	London Luton Airport	London	9,513,704	9,617,697	▲1.1%
39	Poland	Frederic Chopin Airport	Warsaw	9,337,907	9,585,532	▲2.7%
40	Germany	Cologne Bonn Airport	Cologne / Bonn	9,623,398	9,280,070	▼3.6%
41	Italy	Linate Airport	Milan	9,128,522	9,229,890	▲1.1%
42	United Kingdom	Edinburgh Airport	Edinburgh	9,385,245	9,195,061	▼2.0%
43	United Kingdom	Birmingham Airport	Birmingham	8,616,296	8,922,539	▲3.6%
44	Italy	Orio al Serio Airport	Milan / Bergamo	8,419,948	8,890,720	▲5.6%
45	Spain	Alicante Airport	Alicante	9,913,731	8,855,444	▼10.7%
46	Hungary	Budapest Liszt Ferenc International Airport	Budapest	8,920,653	8,504,020	▼4.7%
47	Ukraine	Boryspil International Airport	Kyiv	8,047,072	8,478,091	▲5.4%
48	France	Lyon-Saint Exupéry Airport	Lyon	8,437,141	8,451,039	▲0.2%
49	France	Marseille Provence Airport	Marseille	7,363,068	8,295,479	▲12.7%
50	Italy	Venice Marco Polo Airport	Venice	8,584,651	8,188,455	▼4.6%
51	France	Blagnac Airport	Toulouse	6,988,140	7,559,350	▲8.2%
52	United Kingdom	Glasgow Airport	Glasgow	6,880,217	7,157,859	▲4.0%
53	Romania	Henri Coandă International Airport	Bucharest	5,049,443	7,120,024	▲41.0%
54	Germany	Berlin Schönefeld Airport	Berlin	7,113,989	7,097,274	▼0.2%
55	Belgium	Brussels South Charleroi Airport	Charleroi	5,901,007	6,516,427	▲10.4%
56	Italy	Catania-Fontanarossa Airport	Catania	6,794,063	6,246,888	▼8.1%
57	Portugal	Francisco de Sá Carneiro Airport	Porto	6,003,408	6,050,094	▲0.8%
58	Italy	Bologna Airport	Bologna	5,885,884	5,958,648	▲1.2%
59	United Kingdom	Bristol Airport	Bristol	5,780,746	5,921,530	▲2.3%
60	Norway	Bergen Airport, Flesland	Bergen	5,601,394	5,814,413	▲3.8%
61	Italy	Naples Airport	Naples	5,768,873	5,801,836	▲0.6%
62	Portugal	Faro Airport	Faro	5,615,580	5,672,377	▲1.0%
63	Spain	Ibiza Airport	Ibiza	5,643,180	5,555,048	▼1.6%
64	Switzerland; France; Germany	EuroAirport Basel-Mulhouse-Freiburg	Basel / Mulhouse / Freiburg	5,053,643	5,354,674	▲6.0%
65	Germany	Langenhagen Airport	Hanover	5,340,264	5,287,831	▼1.0%
66	Greece	Heraklion International Airport	Heraklion	5,247,007	5,052,043	▼3.7%
67	Sweden	Göteborg Landvetter Airport	Gothenburg	4,906,639	4,854,888	▼1.1%
68	Latvia	Riga International Airport	Riga	5,106,926	4,767,764	▼6.6%
69	Spain	Valencia Airport	Valencia	4,979,511	4,752,020	▼4.6%
70	Italy	Falcone–Borsellino Airport	Palermo	4,992,798	4,608,533	▼7.7%
71	Italy	Rome Ciampino Airport	Rome	4,781,731	4,497,376	▼5.9%
72	Italy	Galileo Galilei Airport	Pisa	4,526,723	4,494,915	▼0.7%
73	United Kingdom	Liverpool John Lennon Airport	Liverpool	5,251,161	4,463,257	▼15.0%
74	Norway	Stavanger Airport, Sola	Stavanger	4,131,974	4,413,987	▲6.8%
75	France	Bordeaux - Mérignac Airport	Bordeaux	4,112,575	4,428,072	▲7.7%
76	United Kingdom	Newcastle Airport	Newcastle upon Tyne	4,346,270	4,366,196	▲0.5%
77	United Kingdom	Belfast International Airport	Belfast	4,103,620	4,313,685	▲5.1%
78	Spain	San Pablo Airport	Seville	4,959,359	4,292,020	▼13.5%
79	Spain	Bilbao Airport	Bilbao	4,046,172	4,171,065	▲3.1%
80	Norway	Trondheim Airport, Værnes	Trondheim	3,926,461	4,160,162	▲6.0%
81	United Kingdom	East Midlands Airport	Derby / Leicester / Nottingham	4,215,192	4,076,178	▼3.3%
82	Greece	Thessaloniki International Airport, "Macedonia"	Thessaloniki	3,958,475	4,006,204	▲1.2%
83	France	Beauvais-Tillé Airport	Beauvais	3,677,794	3,862,562	▲5.0%
84	Greece	Rhodes International Airport	Rhodes	4,148,386	3,813,947	▼8.1%
85	Italy	Bari Airport	Bari	3,725,629	3,780,112	▲1.5%
86	Malta	Malta International Airport	Malta	3,506,521	3,649,938	▲4.1%
87	France	Nantes Atlantique Airport	Nantes	3,246,226	3,631,693	▲11.9%
88	Germany	Nuremberg Airport	Nuremberg	3,962,617	3,597,136	▼9.2%
89	Italy	Cagliari-Elmas Airport	Cagliari	3,698,982	3,592,020	▼2.9%
90	Italy	Turin Airport	Turin	3,710,485	3,521,847	▼5.1%
91	Bulgaria	Sofia Airport	Sofia	3,474,993	3,467,455	▼0.2%
92	Poland	Kraków Airport	Kraków	3,013,960	3,438,758	▲14.1%
93	Serbia	Belgrade Nikola Tesla Airport	Belgrade	3,124,633	3,363,919	▲7.7%

== 2011 ==
Rank 2011	Country	Airport	City	Passengers 2010	Passengers 2011	Change 2010–2011
1	United Kingdom	London Heathrow Airport	London	65,881,660	69,433,230	▲5.4%
2	France	Paris-Charles de Gaulle Airport	Paris	58,164,612	60,970,551	▲4.8%
3	Germany	Frankfurt Airport	Frankfurt	53,009,221	56,436,255	▲6.5%
4	Netherlands	Amsterdam Airport Schiphol	Amsterdam	45,211,749	49,755,252	▲10.0%
5	Spain	Madrid Barajas Airport	Madrid	49,866,113	49,671,270	▼0.4%
6	Germany	Munich Airport	Munich	34,721,605	37,763,701	▲8.8%
7	Italy	Rome-Fiumicino Airport	Rome	36,337,050	37,651,700	▲3.6%
8	Turkey	Atatürk International Airport	Istanbul	32,143,819	37,394,694	▲16.3%
9	Spain	Barcelona–El Prat Josep Tarradellas Airport	Barcelona	29,209,536	34,398,226	▲17.8%
10	United Kingdom	Gatwick Airport	London	31,375,290	33,674,264	▲7.3%
11	France	Orly Airport	Paris	25,203,969	27,139,076	▲7.7%
12	Russia	Domodedovo International Airport	Moscow	22,253,529	25,701,610	▲15.5%
13	Switzerland	Zurich Airport	Zürich	22,878,251	24,337,954	▲6.4%
14	Spain	Palma de Mallorca Airport	Palma de Mallorca	21,117,417	22,726,707	▲7.6%
15	Denmark	Copenhagen Airport	Copenhagen	21,501,750	22,725,517	▲5.7%
16	Russia	Sheremetyevo International Airport	Moscow	19,123,007	22,351,317	▲16.9%
17	Austria	Vienna International Airport	Vienna	19,691,206	21,106,292	▲7.2%
18	Norway	Oslo Airport	Oslo	19,091,036	21,103,623	▲10.5%
19	Germany	Düsseldorf Airport	Düsseldorf	18,988,149	20,339,466	▲7.1%
20	Italy	Milan Malpensa Airport	Milan	18,947,808	19,303,131	▲1.9%
21	Sweden	Stockholm-Arlanda Airport	Stockholm	16,962,416	19,069,065	▲12.4%
22	United Kingdom	Manchester Airport	Manchester	17,759,173	18,892,756	▲6.4%
23	Belgium	Brussels Airport	Brussels	17,180,606	18,786,034	▲9.3%
24	Ireland	Dublin Airport	Dublin	18,431,064	18,740,953	▲1.7%
25	United Kingdom	London Stansted Airport	London	18,573,592	18,052,843	▼2.8%
26	Germany	Berlin Tegel Airport	Berlin	15,025,600	16,919,820	▲12.6%
27	Finland	Helsinki Airport	Helsinki	12,872,622	14,865,871	▲15.5%
28	Portugal	Lisbon Portela Airport	Lisbon	14,066,534	14,790,242	▲5.1%
29	Greece	Athens International Airport	Athens	15,411,099	14,446,971	▼6.3%
30	Germany	Hamburg Airport	Hamburg	12,962,429	13,558,261	▲4.6%
31	Switzerland	Geneva Cointrin International Airport	Geneva	11,785,522	13,111,741	▲11.3%
32	Spain	Málaga Airport	Málaga	12,064,521	12,823,117	▲6.3%
33	Czech Republic	Václav Havel Airport Prague	Prague	11,556,858	11,788,629	▲2.0%
34	France	Nice Côte d'Azur Airport	Nice	9,603,014	10,422,073	▲8.5%
35	Spain	Alicante Airport	Alicante	9,382,931	9,913,731	▲5.7%
36	Germany	Cologne Bonn Airport	Cologne / Bonn	9,849,779	9,623,398	▼2.3%
37	Russia	Pulkovo Airport	Saint Petersburg	8,443,753	9,610,767	▲13.8%
38	Germany	Stuttgart Airport	Stuttgart	9,218,095	9,582,265	▲4.0%
39	United Kingdom	London Luton Airport	London	8,738,712	9,513,704	▲8.9%
40	United Kingdom	Edinburgh Airport	Edinburgh	8,596,715	9,385,245	▲9.2%
41	Poland	Frederic Chopin Airport	Warsaw	8,712,384	9,337,907	▲7.2%
42	Italy	Milan Linate Airport	Milan	8,296,450	9,128,522	▲10.0%
43	Hungary	Budapest Liszt Ferenc International Airport	Budapest	8,190,089	8,920,653	▲8.9%
44	United Kingdom	Birmingham Airport	Birmingham	8,572,398	8,616,296	▲0.5%
45	Italy	Venice Marco Polo Airport	Venice	6,854,595	8,584,651	▲25.2%
46	France	Lyon-Saint Exupéry Airport	Lyon	7,979,228	8,437,141	▲5.7%
47	Italy	Bergamo Orio al Serio airport	Milan / Bergamo	7,677,224	8,419,948	▲9.7%
48	Russia	Vnukovo International Airport	Moscow	9,460,292	8,197,162	▼13.4%
49	Ukraine	Boryspil International Airport	Kyiv	6,692,382	8,047,072	▲20.2%
50	France	Marseille Provence Airport	Marseille	7,522,167	7,363,068	▼2.1%
51	Germany	Berlin Schönefeld Airport	Berlin	7,297,911	7,113,989	▼2.5%
52	France	Blagnac Airport	Toulouse	6,405,906	6,988,140	▲9.1%
53	United Kingdom	Glasgow Airport	Glasgow	6,548,865	6,880,217	▲5.1%
54	Italy	Catania-Fontanarossa Airport	Catania	6,318,177	6,794,063	▲7.5%
55	Portugal	Francisco de Sá Carneiro Airport	Porto	5,279,531	6,003,408	▲13.7%
56	Belgium	Brussels South Charleroi Airport	Charleroi	5,195,372	5,901,007	▲13.6%
57	Italy	Bologna Airport	Bologna	5,503,106	5,885,884	▲7.0%
58	United Kingdom	Bristol Airport	Bristol	5,747,604	5,780,746	▲0.6%
59	Italy	Naples Airport	Naples	5,571,738	5,768,873	▲3.5%
60	Spain	Ibiza Airport	Ibiza	5,040,800	5,643,180	▲12.0%
61	Portugal	Faro Airport	Faro	5,342,439	5,615,580	▲5.1%
62	Norway	Bergen Airport, Flesland	Bergen	5,078,267	5,814,413	▲3.8%
63	Germany	Langenhagen Airport	Hanover	5,059,800	5,340,264	▲5.5%
64	United Kingdom	Liverpool John Lennon Airport	Liverpool	5,013,940	5,251,161	▲4.7%
65	Greece	Heraklion International Airport	Heraklion	4,907,337	5,247,007	▲6.9%
66	Latvia	Riga International Airport	Riga	4,663,647	5,106,926	▲9.5%
67	Switzerland; France; Germany	EuroAirport Basel-Mulhouse-Freiburg	Basel / Mulhouse / Freiburg	4,129,186	5,053,664	▲22.0%
68	Romania	Henri Coandă International Airport	Bucharest	4,917,952	5,049,443	▲2.7%
69	Italy	Falcone–Borsellino Airport	Palermo	4,343,227	4,992,798	▲15.0%
70	Spain	Valencia Airport	Valencia	4,934,268	4,979,511	▲0.9%
71	Spain	San Pablo Airport	Seville	4,224,718	4,959,359	▲17.4%
72	Sweden	Göteborg Landvetter Airport	Gothenburg	4,133,299	4,906,639	▲18.7%
73	Italy	Rome Ciampino Airport	Rome	4,531,834	4,781,731	▲5.5%
74	Italy	Pisa Airport	Pisa	4,058,957	4,526,723	▲11.5%
75	United Kingdom	Newcastle Airport	Newcastle upon Tyne	4,356,130	4,346,270	▼0.2%
76	United Kingdom	East Midlands Airport	Derby / Leicester / Nottingham	4,113,501	4,215,192	▲2.5%
77	Greece	Rhodes International Airport	Rhodes	3,586,572	4,148,386	▲15.7%
78	Norway	Stavanger Airport, Sola	Stavanger	3,674,816	4,131,974	▲12.4%
79	France	Bordeaux - Mérignac Airport	Bordeaux	3,660,042	4,112,575	▲12.4%
80	United Kingdom	Belfast International Airport	Belfast	4,016,170	4,103,620	▲2.2%
81	Spain	Bilbao Airport	Bilbao	3,888,955	4,046,172	▲4.0%
88	Germany	Nuremberg Airport	Nuremberg	4,068,799	3,962,617	▼2.6%
82	Greece	Thessaloniki International Airport, "Macedonia"	Thessaloniki	3,910,751	3,958,475	▲1.2%
83	Norway	Trondheim Airport, Værnes	Trondheim	3,521,734	3,926,461	▲11.5%
84	Italy	Bari Airport	Bari	3,398,110	3,725,629	▲9.6%
85	Italy	Turin Airport	Turin	3,552,519	3,710,485	▲4.4%
86	Italy	Cagliari-Elmas Airport	Cagliari	3,443,227	3,698,982	▲7.4%
87	France	Beauvais-Tillé Airport	Beauvais	2,931,796	3,677,794	▲25.4%
88	Malta	Malta International Airport	Malta	3,293,524	3,506,521	▲6.4%
89	Bulgaria	Sofia Airport	Sofia	3,296,936	3,474,993	▲5.4%
90	Italy	Verona Villafranca Airport	Verona	3,022,784	3,385,794	▲12.0%
91	France	Nantes Atlantique Airport	Nantes	3,031,510	3,246,226	▲7.1%
92	Serbia	Belgrade Nikola Tesla Airport	Belgrade	2,698,730	3,124,633	▲15.8%

== 2010 ==
Rank 2010	Country	Airport	City	Passengers 2009	Passengers 2010	Change 2009–2010
1	United Kingdom	London Heathrow Airport	London	66,036,957	65,881,660	▼0.2%
2	France	Paris-Charles de Gaulle Airport	Paris	57,906,866	58,164,612	▲0.4%
3	Germany	Frankfurt Airport	Frankfurt	50,932,840	53,009,221	▲4.1%
4	Spain	Barajas Airport	Madrid	48,437,147	49,866,113	▲3.3%
5	Netherlands	Amsterdam Airport Schiphol	Amsterdam	43,570,370	45,211,749	▲3.8%
6	Italy	Leonardo da Vinci-Fiumicino Airport	Rome	33,808,093	36,337,050	▲7.5%
7	Germany	Munich Airport	Munich	32,681,067	34,721,605	▲6.2%
8	Turkey	Atatürk International Airport	Istanbul	29,812,888	32,143,819	▲8.0%
9	United Kingdom	Gatwick Airport	London	32,392,520	31,375,290	▼3.1%
10	Spain	Barcelona El Prat Airport	Barcelona	27,421,682	29,209,536	▲6.9%
11	France	Paris-Orly Airport	Paris	25,107,693	25,203,969	▲0.4%
12	Switzerland	Zurich Airport	Zürich	21,926,872	22,878,251	▲4.3%
13	Russia	Domodedovo International Airport	Moscow	18,676,077	22,253,529	▲19.2%
14	Denmark	Copenhagen Airport	Copenhagen	19,715,451	21,501,750	▲9.1%
15	Spain	Palma de Mallorca Airport	Palma de Mallorca	21,203,041	21,117,417	▼0.4%
16	Austria	Vienna International Airport	Vienna	18,114,103	19,691,206	▲8.7%
17	Russia	Sheremetyevo International Airport	Moscow	14,764,000	19,123,007	▲29.5%
18	Norway	Oslo Airport	Oslo	18,087,722	19,091,036	▲5.5%
19	Germany	Düsseldorf Airport	Düsseldorf	17,793,493	18,988,149	▲6.7%
20	Italy	Malpensa Airport	Milan	17,551,635	18,947,808	▲8.0%
21	United Kingdom	London Stansted Airport	London	19,957,077	18,573,592	▼6.9%
22	Ireland	Dublin Airport	Dublin	20,503,677	18,431,064	▼10.1%
23	United Kingdom	Manchester Airport	Manchester	18,724,889	17,759,173	▼5.2%
24	Belgium	Brussels Airport	Brussels	16,999,154	17,180,606	▲1.1%
25	Sweden	Stockholm-Arlanda Airport	Stockholm	16,064,071	16,962,416	▲5.6%
26	Greece	Athens International Airport	Athens	16,225,589	15,411,099	▼5.0%
27	Germany	Berlin Tegel Airport	Berlin	14,180,237	15,025,600	▲6.0%
28	Portugal	Lisbon Portela Airport	Lisbon	13,261,203	14,066,534	▲6.1%
29	Germany	Hamburg Airport	Hamburg	12,229,319	12,962,429	▲6.0%
30	Finland	Helsinki Airport	Helsinki	12,611,187	12,872,622	▲2.1%
31	Spain	Málaga Airport	Málaga	11,622,429	12,064,521	▲3.8%
32	Switzerland	Geneva Cointrin International Airport	Geneva	11,324,141	11,785,522	▲4.9%
33	Czech Republic	Ruzyně Airport	Prague	11,643,366	11,556,858	▼0.7%
34	Germany	Cologne Bonn Airport	Cologne / Bonn	9,739,581	9,849,779	▲1.1%
35	France	Nice Côte d'Azur Airport	Nice	9,830,987	9,603,014	▼2.3%
36	Russia	Vnukovo International Airport	Moscow	7,731,000	9,460,292	▲22.4%
37	Spain	Alicante Airport	Alicante	9,139,479	9,382,931	▲2.7%
38	Germany	Stuttgart Airport	Stuttgart	8,934,493	9,218,095	▲3.2%
39	United Kingdom	London Luton Airport	London	9,120,546	8,738,712	▼4.2%
40	Poland	Frederic Chopin Airport	Warsaw	8,320,927	8,712,384	▲5.2%
41	United Kingdom	Edinburgh Airport	Edinburgh	9,049,355	8,596,715	▼5.0%
42	United Kingdom	Birmingham Airport	Birmingham	9,102,899	8,572,398	▼5.8%
43	Russia	Pulkovo Airport	Saint Petersburg	6,758,352	8,443,753	▲24.9%
44	Italy	Linate Airport	Milan	8,295,099	8,296,450	▲0.0%
45	Hungary	Budapest Liszt Ferenc International Airport	Budapest	8,095,367	8,190,089	▲1.2%
46	France	Lyon-Saint Exupéry Airport	Lyon	7,717,609	7,979,228	▲3.4%
47	Italy	Orio al Serio Airport	Milan / Bergamo	7,157,421	7,677,224	▲7.3%
48	France	Marseille Provence Airport	Marseille	7,290,119	7,522,167	▲3.2%
49	Germany	Berlin Schönefeld Airport	Berlin	6,797,158	7,297,911	▲7.4%
50	Italy	Venice Marco Polo Airport	Venice	6,701,689	6,854,595	▲2.3%
51	Ukraine	Boryspil International Airport	Kyiv	5,795,000	6,692,382	▲15.5%
52	United Kingdom	Glasgow Airport	Glasgow	7,225,021	6,548,865	▼9.4%
53	France	Blagnac Airport	Toulouse	6,277,621	6,405,906	▲2.0%
54	Italy	Catania-Fontanarossa Airport	Catania	5,931,592	6,318,177	▲6.5%
55	United Kingdom	Bristol Airport	Bristol	5,642,921	5,747,604	▲1.9%
56	Italy	Naples Airport	Naples	5,310,965	5,571,738	▲4.9%
57	Italy	Bologna Airport	Bologna	4,774,697	5,503,106	▲15.3%
58	Portugal	Faro Airport	Faro	5,061,801	5,342,439	▲5.5%
59	Portugal	Francisco de Sá Carneiro Airport	Porto	4,508,330	5,279,531	▲17.1%
60	Belgium	Brussels South Charleroi Airport	Charleroi	3,937,187	5,195,372	▲32.0%
61	Norway	Bergen Airport, Flesland	Bergen	4,862,869	5,078,267	▲4.4%
62	Germany	Langenhagen Airport	Hanover	4,969,799	5,059,800	▲1.8%
63	Spain	Ibiza Airport	Ibiza	4,572,819	5,040,800	▲10.2%
64	United Kingdom	Liverpool John Lennon Airport	Liverpool	4,884,494	5,013,940	▲2.7%
65	Spain	Valencia Airport	Valencia	4,748,977	4,934,268	▲3.9%
66	Romania	Henri Coandă International Airport	Bucharest	4,483,661	4,917,952	▲9.8%
67	Greece	Heraklion International Airport	Heraklion	5,052,840	4,907,337	▼2.9%
68	Spain	Girona-Costa Brava Airport	Girona	5,286,970	4,863,954	▼8.0%
69	Latvia	Riga International Airport	Riga	4,066,854	4,663,647	▲14.7%
70	Italy	Rome Ciampino Airport	Rome	4,757,822	4,531,834	▼4.7%
71	United Kingdom	Newcastle Airport	Newcastle upon Tyne	4,587,883	4,356,130	▼5.1%
72	Italy	Falcone–Borsellino Airport	Palermo	4,350,563	4,343,227	▼0.2%
73	Spain	San Pablo Airport	Seville	4,051,392	4,224,718	▲4.3%
74	Sweden	Göteborg Landvetter Airport	Gothenburg	3,689,254	4,133,299	▲12.0%
75	Switzerland; France; Germany	EuroAirport Basel-Mulhouse-Freiburg	Basel; Mulhouse; Freiburg	3,850,378	4,129,186	▲7.1%
76	United Kingdom	East Midlands Airport	Derby / Leicester / Nottingham	4,658,151	4,113,501	▼11.7%
77	Germany	Nuremberg Airport	Nuremberg	3,965,743	4,068,799	▲2.6%
78	Italy	Galileo Galilei Airport	Pisa	4,011,525	4,058,957	▲1.2%
79	United Kingdom	Belfast International Airport	Belfast	4,546,475	4,016,170	▼11.7%
80	Greece	Thessaloniki International Airport, "Macedonia"	Thessaloniki	4,104,195	3,910,751	▼4.7%
81	Spain	Bilbao Airport	Bilbao	3,654,957	3,888,955	▲6.4%
82	Norway	Stavanger Airport, Sola	Stavanger	3,617,980	3,674,816	▲1.6%
83	France	Bordeaux - Mérignac Airport	Bordeaux	3,318,059	3,660,042	▲10.3%
84	Greece	Rhodes International Airport	Rhodes	3,470,111	3,586,572	▲3.4%
85	Italy	Turin Airport	Turin	3,220,576	3,552,519	▲10.3%
86	Norway	Trondheim Airport, Værnes	Trondheim	3,424,965	3,521,734	▲2.8%
87	Germany	Frankfurt-Hahn Airport	Kirchberg / Simmern	3,793,710	3,493,451	▼7.9%
88	Italy	Cagliari-Elmas Airport	Cagliari	3,329,008	3,438,298	▲3.3%
89	Italy	Bari Airport	Bari	2,825,456	3,398,110	▲20.4%
90	Bulgaria	Sofia Airport	Sofia	3,134,194	3,296,936	▲5.2%
91	Malta	Malta International Airport	Malta	2,918,664	3,293,524	▲12.8%
92	France	Nantes Atlantique Airport	Nantes	2,650,611	3,031,510	▲14.4%
93	Italy	Verona Villafranca Airport	Verona	3,065,968	3,022,784	▼1.5%
94	France	Beauvais-Tillé Airport	Beauvais	2,591,864	2,931,796	▲13.1%
