= KTU Faculty of Medicine =

Coordinates: 40°59′34″N 39°46′11″E

Karadeniz Technical University Faculty of Medicine
- Established: 1973
- Parent institution: Karadeniz Technical University
- Dean: Prof. Mustafa İmamoglu, MD
- Location: Trabzon, Turkey
- Website: http://www.ktu.edu.tr/tip

KTU Faculty of Medicine is the medical school of Karadeniz Technical University. It is the first of two medical schools in Trabzon, Turkey. The school was officially founded in 1973 and it is the oldest medical faculty in eastern Black Sea region.

== Foundation ==
Dated 4 January 1973, Karadeniz University Faculty of Medicine, 6th faculty of Karadeniz University was founded under the name of Faculty of Medicine and Health Sciences according to the Chapter 1650. In addition to its own divisions, Trabzon Faculty of Medicine, established as a unit of Hacettepe University, was also staffed by the Faculty of Medicine and Health Sciences. Trabzon Faculty of Medicine, once affiliated to Hacettepe University, admitted students in 1976-1977 instructional year and those students continued their education in Hacettepe University. In accordance with the legal decision, issued 41 and dated 20.7.1982, KTU Faculty of Medicine and Health Medicine joined together as Karadeniz University Medicine Faculty.

== Divisions ==
The faculty is composed of three divisions, namely Basic Medical Sciences, Internal Medical Sciences and Surgical Medical Sciences.
