= Nazan Bekiroğlu =

Turkish novelist

- Born: 3 May 1957 (age 69); Trabzon, Turkey
- Occupations: Novelist and academic

Nazan Bekiroğlu (born 3 May 1957) is a Turkish novelist and academic.

== Biography ==
She was born on May 3, 1957, in Trabzon. She was the youngest of three children born to a family with an interest in literature. Her father was the owner of a local newspaper called "Target" and was interested in Ottoman history as well as literature. Her father died when she was 14 years old. Her father became the hero of the story "Inside a Pain". After completing her primary and secondary education in Trabzon, she went to Erzurum and graduated from Atatürk University, Faculty of Literature, Department of Turkish Language and Literature (1979). During her student years, she was in pursuit of folk literature and Central Asian aesthetics. She reflected this to some extent in her early stories. (Miss Air is Dead). She received encouragement and support from her teacher Orhan Okay in the development of both her artistic and academic personality. After working as a high school teacher for four years, she entered Karadeniz Technical University Fatih Education Faculty Turkish Language and Literature Education Department as a lecturer (1985). She completed her doctorate on Technical Analysis of Halide Edib Adıvar's Novels, which she continued under the direction of Orhan Okay, in 1987. She started working as a lecturer in the same department. She became an associate professor with her work on the poet Nigar Hanım (1995). She published her first book, Nun Tales, in 1997. Nazan Bekiroğlu, who has been working as a faculty member in the Turkish education department at Karadeniz Technical University since 1998, became a professor on May 4, 2001. Numerous scientific articles, essays and stories have been published in various journals. She is the mother of two children.

She has been publishing stories, essays, novels and reviews since 1997. In 2006, she received the Turkish Writers Union's story award with her story Cam Irmağı, Taş Gemi.

== Life story in her own words ==
She has always lived in this city except for four years in university. Cloud. Sea. Rain.

She studied Turkish Language and Literature in Erzurum. Snow. Wind. Lowland.
Ph.D. with Halide Edip,
Assistant professor with Nigar Hanım.
More recently, professor in KTÜ, Fatih School of Education. At the seaside.
Mother of two daughters.

This is her current life.

== Published books ==
- Nun Masalları (Stories of Nun ) (Story, Dergâh, 1997; Nun Edition, 2007)
- Şair Nigar Hanım (Ms. Nigar the Poet) (Examination, İletişim, 1998)
- Halide Edib Adıvar (Ph.D. thesis, Şule, 1999)
- Mor Mürekkep (Purple Ink) (Essay, İyiadam, 1999)
- Yusuf İle Züleyha / Kalbin Üzerine Titreyen Hüzün (Yusuf and Zulaikha / Aflutter Gloom on the Heart) (Orientel Mesnevî, Timaş, 2000)
- Mavi Lâle, Yitik Lâle (Blue Tulip, Lost Tulip) (Essay, İyiadam Publication, 2001)
- İsimle Ateş Arasında (Between Name and Fire) (Novel, Timaş, 2002)
- Cümle Kapısı (Sentence Door)(Essay, Timaş, 2004)(TYB Essay Award 2003)
- Cam Irmağı Taş Gemi (Glass River, Lapidary Ship) (Story, Timaş, 2006) (TYB Story Award 2006)
- Lâ: Sonsuzluk Hecesi (Lâ: Syllable of Infinity) (Novel-Mesnevî, 2008)
- Yol Hali (The Status of Road) (Novel, Timaş, 2010)
- Nar Ağacı (Pomegranate Tree) (Novel, Timaş, 2012)
- Mimoza Sürgünü(Exile of Mimosa) (Essay, Timaş, 2013)
- Kelime Defteri (The Notebook of Words) (Essay, Timaş, 2014)
- Mücellâ (Novel, Timaş, 2015)
- Karınca İzleri - Hikmet Aksoy Kitabı (The Marks of Ants - A book of Hikmet Aksoy) (Timaş, 2015)
