= Atatürk Airport =

General aviation airport in Istanbul, Turkey

Atatürk Airport Atatürk Havalimanı
- IATA: ISL; ICAO: LTBA

Summary
- Airport type: Public
- Owner: General Directorate of State Airports (DHMİ)
- Operator: TAV Airports
- Serves: Istanbul, Turkey
- Location: Bakırköy, Istanbul, Turkey
- Opened: 1911 (In Yeşilköy Air Base); 1 August 1953 (as airport)
- Closed: 5 February 2022 (cargo)
- Passenger services ceased: 6 April 2019
- Built: 1912 (as airfield)
- Elevation AMSL: 163 ft (50 m)
- Coordinates: 40°58′34″N 028°48′51″E
- Website: ataturkairport.com (archived on 8 February 2020)

Maps
- Location within Istanbul ISL (Turkey) ISL (Europe) ISL (North Atlantic)
- Interactive map of Atatürk Airport

Runways
Direction	Length		Surface
Direction	m	ft	Surface
05/23	2,580	8,465	Grooved asphalt

Statistics (2019)
- Annual passenger capacity: 38,200,000
- Passengers: 16,112,804
- Passenger change 2018–19: ▼76%
- Aircraft movements: 138,279
- Movements change 2018–19: ▼70%

Atatürk Airport (IATA: ISL, ICAO: LTBA) or formerly known as Yeşilköy Airport is a public airport located in Yeşilköy, Istanbul Province, Turkey. Formerly the primary international airport of Istanbul and the hub of Turkish Airlines, it was closed to commercial passenger flights on 6 April 2019. From that point, all commercial scheduled passenger flights were transferred to the new Istanbul Airport. Since the move of commercial operations to the new airport, Atatürk Airport is open to general aviation and functions as an executive airport.

== History ==
=== Growth and development ===
In 1911, a small apron with two hangars was built in Yeşilköy, Istanbul, for the Ottoman Armed Forces. Mustafa Kemal Atatürk founded Türk Tayyare Cemiyeti (Turkish Aircraft Company, today Türk Hava Kurumu - THK) in 1925. In 1933, today's Turkish Airlines, the Türkiye Devlet Hava Yolları started its flights with two Curtiss Kingbird aircraft. Flights from Istanbul to Ankara and Athens began.

Following the signing of the Convention on International Civil Aviation in Chicago in 1944, plans were made to develop Yeşilköy into an international airport. Construction began in 1949, with the project involving American companies Westinghouse Electric Company and J. G. White Engineering Corporation. The new airport was completed in 1953 and officially opened on 1 August that year as Yeşilköy Airport. It included a passenger terminal, an international-standard runway, taxiways and aircraft maintenance facilities.

By the 1960s the airport’s single runway was unable to cope with the growing amount of air traffic. Construction of a second runway was started in 1968, and completed in 1972. A 1971 master plan by architect Hayati Tabanlıoğlu further proposed new terminals and supporting infrastructure to accommodate growth.

A new international terminal opened on 29 October 1983. In 1985, the airport was renamed Atatürk International Airport by then-President Kenan Evren. A cargo terminal was opened in 1993, while Terminal C began operating on 7 December 1995 to serve the growth in charter flights and passenger traffic associated with cross-border trade following the dissolution of the Soviet Union. Terminal C ceased passenger operations in January 2000 and was later used for private cargo operators.

A new international terminal, built under a build-operate-transfer agreement, opened on 10 January 2000. The terminal was subsequently expanded, and the domestic terminal was modernised after its operation was transferred to TAV Airports in 2005. Further upgrades increased the airport’s annual passenger capacity to approximately 38.2 million.

Atatürk Airport continued to grow as an international hub during the 2000s and 2010s. It served more than 60 million passengers in 2015, making it the 11th-busiest airport in the world in terms of total passenger traffic and the 10th-busiest in the world in terms of international passenger traffic. In 2017, it was Europe's 5th-busiest airport after London–Heathrow, Paris–Charles de Gaulle, Frankfurt Airport, and Amsterdam Airport Schiphol, having fallen from third place after a decline in passengers due to security fears.

=== Closure ===
Istanbul Atatürk Airport was replaced in regards to commercial passenger functions by the newly constructed Istanbul Airport, in April 2019, in order to meet Istanbul's growing domestic and international air traffic demand as a source, destination, and transit point. Both airports were used in parallel for five months from late 2018, with the new airport gradually expanding to serve more domestic and regional destinations. On 6 April 2019, Atatürk's IST IATA airport code was inherited by Istanbul Airport and Atatürk Airport was assigned the code ISL after the full transfer of all scheduled passenger activities to the new airport was completed. The final commercial flight, Turkish Airlines Flight 54, left Atatürk Airport on 6 April 2019 at 02:44 for Singapore.

On 5 February 2022, Turkish Cargo relocated all cargo flights and operations from their former hub at the airport to the new Istanbul Airport.

=== Atatürk Airport National Garden ===
Turkey's government announced its plans to construct a giant park on the grounds of the former Istanbul Atatürk Airport (whose operations were transferred to the new Istanbul Airport) in 2019. The park, Atatürk Airport National Garden, is part of a larger urban transformation plan that seeks to correct some of the haphazard urban planning that characterised most major Turkish cities since the 1970s. Due to the little space available to construct or expand green spaces, new parks are often constructed on spots formerly occupied by factories or other major facilities.

The Atatürk Airport National Garden was to be constructed on and around one of the two runways of Atatürk Airport. These runways were already rendered unusable after they were chosen as the site for Istanbul's pandemic hospital in early 2020. More than 132,500 trees are to be planted in place of the asphalt runway and taxiways that will also help to keep the city cooler. The other runway was set to remain in use for select cargo and private jet flights, aviation fairs (such as Teknofest) and for use by the Turkish Air Force (which still maintains a small training base and the Istanbul Aviation Museum here).

The leader of the Republican People's Party (CHP) Kemal Kılıçdaroğlu called the proposed construction of the park "treason" and threatened to hold those responsible to account.

Construction commenced in 2022. First areas of the park were opened to the public in 2023. In 2024, the Council of State cancelled the construction tender, following a lawsuit filed by Istanbul Metropolitan Municipality. The park officially opened to the public on 1 November 2025.

== Facilities ==
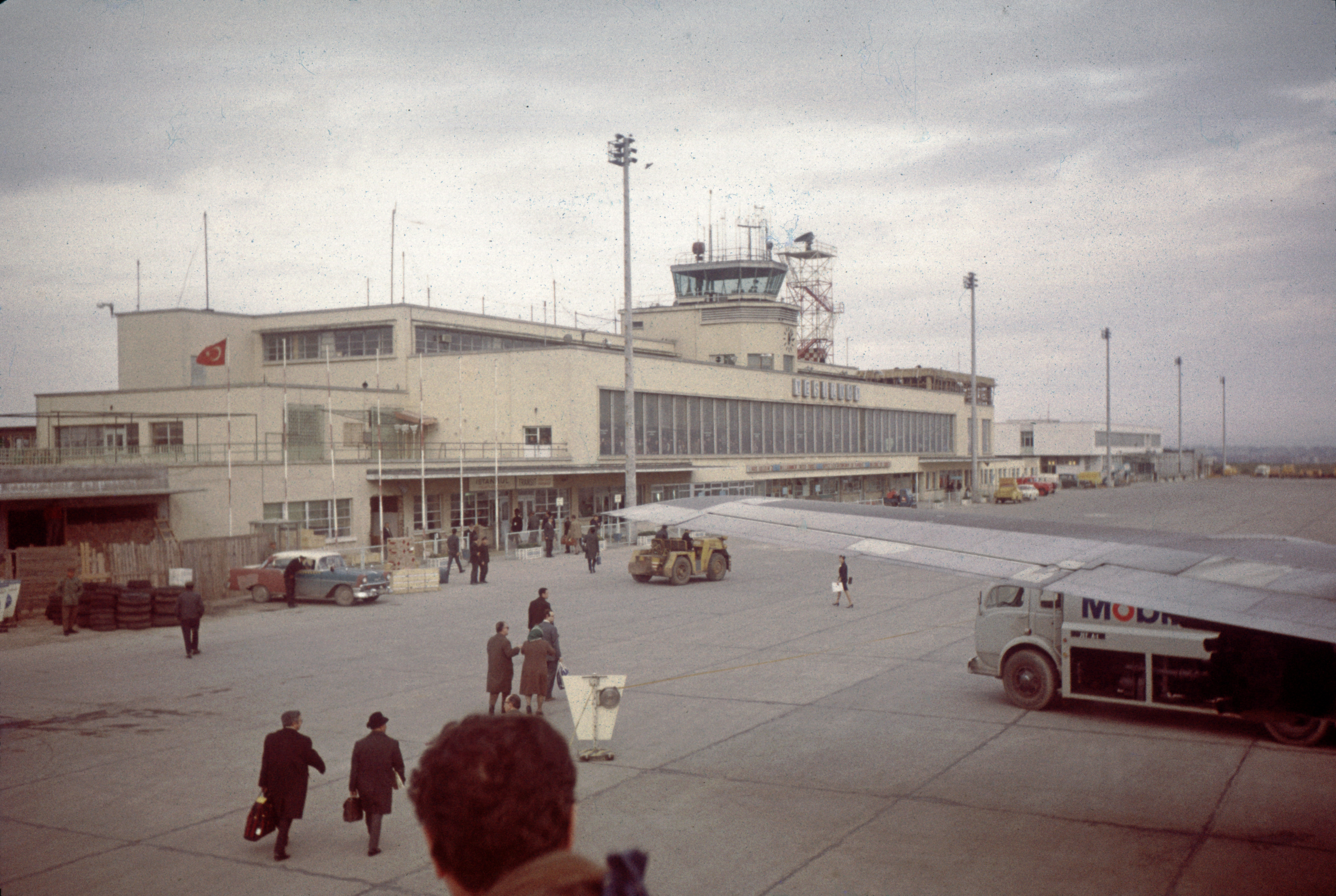
The original terminal at Yeşilköy in 1970

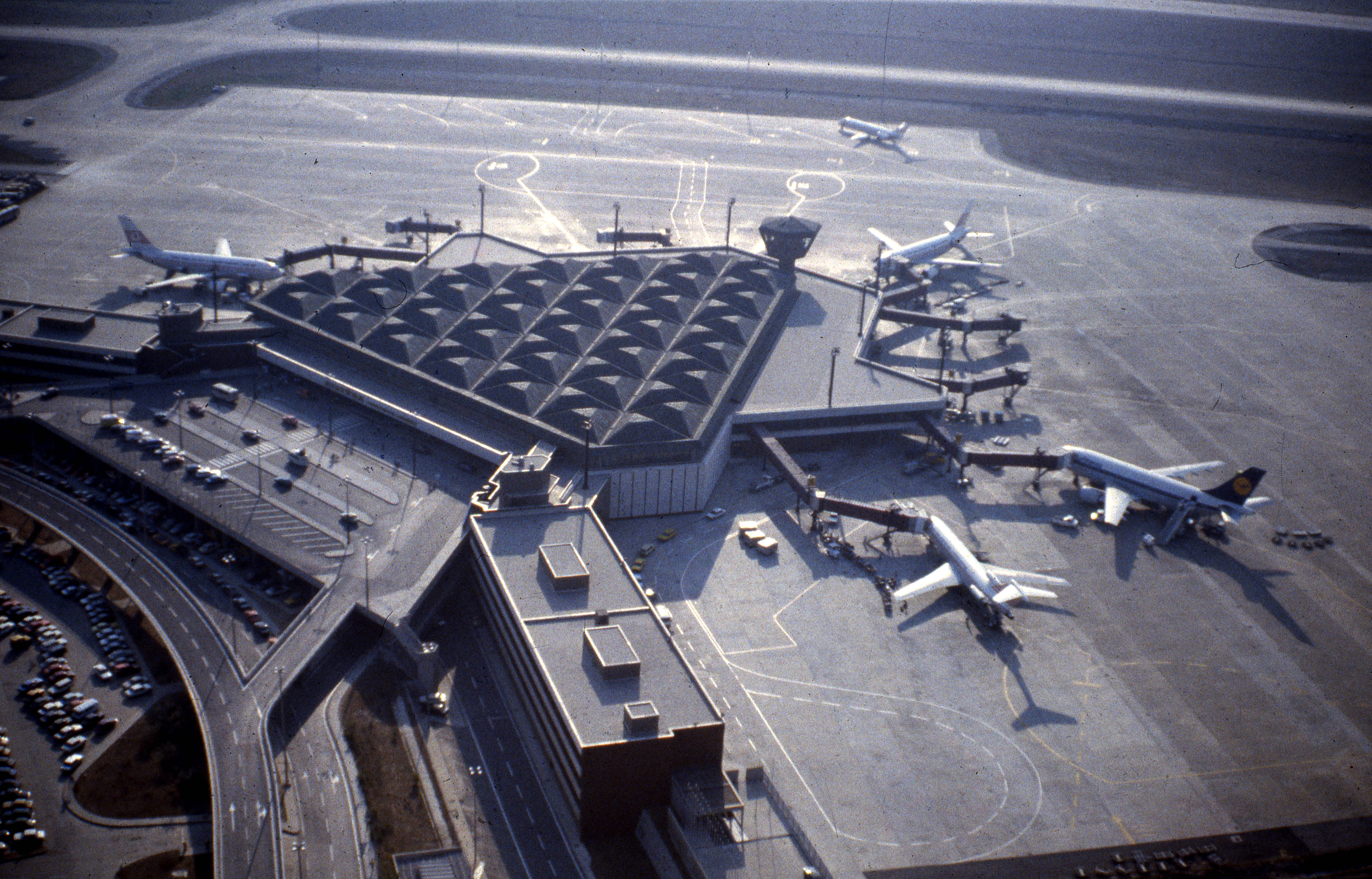
The former main terminal, inaugurated in 1983, which then served as the domestic section until 2019

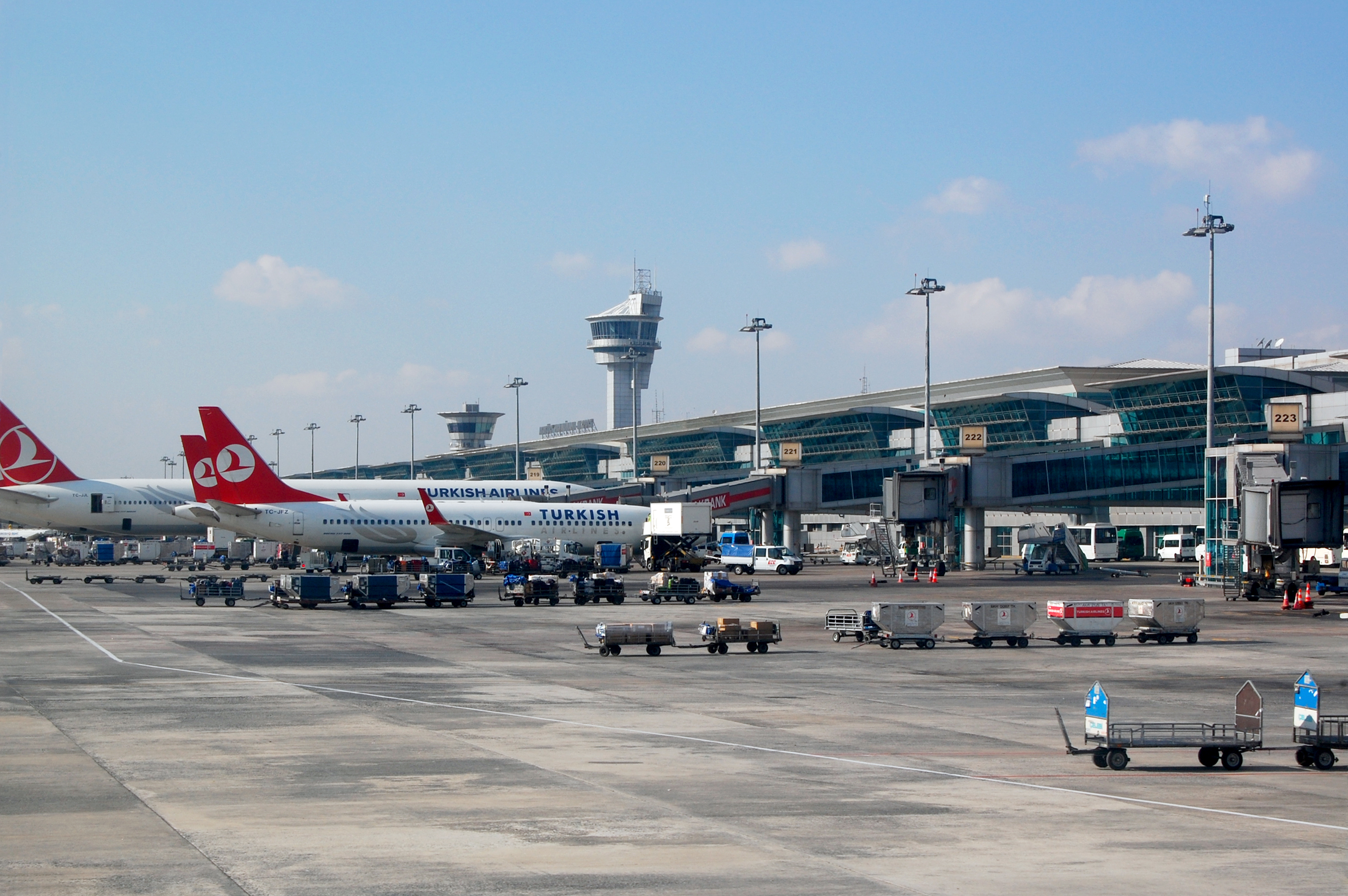
The now defunct main passenger terminal in 2013

=== Former passenger terminals ===
Istanbul Atatürk Airport featured two passenger terminals linked to each other. The former domestic terminal is the older and smaller of the two terminals and exclusively handled domestic flights within Turkey. It featured its own check-in and airside facilities on the upper floor, with twelve departure gates equipped with jet bridges and five baggage claim belts on the ground level. The former international terminal was inaugurated in 2000 and used for all international flights. It featured a large main hall containing 8 check-in aisles and a wide range of airside facilities such as shops and restaurants, 34 gates equipped with jet bridges, and 7 bus-boarding stands. The arrivals floor had 11 baggage claim belts. In addition, there is a general aviation terminal to the northwest of the passenger terminals.

=== Former cargo terminal ===
The airport featured a dedicated cargo terminal including facilities for the handling of radioactive and refrigerated freight.

=== Other facilities ===
- Turkish Airlines has its headquarters in the Turkish Airlines General Management Building, located within the airport campus.
- Prima Aviation Services Inc. has its MRO facilities in new technical site at the air side Gate A.
- A metro station on the M1A line served the airport from its opening on 20 December 2002.
- In May 2020, the Yeşilköy Prof. Dr. Murat Dilmener Emergency Hospital using the former site of the 35L/35R runways were opened in response to the COVID-19 pandemic in Turkey.

== Current operations ==
As of April 2019, all passenger operations have been relocated to the new Istanbul Airport. As of February 2022, all cargo operations have been relocated to the new airport as well. Currently, the airport serves only private and business jets as well as operations on behalf of the Government of Turkey.

== Traffic statistics ==
İstanbul–Atatürk International Airport Passenger Traffic Statistics
Year	Domestic	% change	International	% change	Total	% change
2019	4,236,203	▼78%	11,876,601	▼76%	16,112,804	▼76%
2018	19,216,523	▼2%	49,130,261	▲10%	68,346,784	▲7%
2017	19,629,425	▲3%	44,476,589	▲8%	64,106,014	▲6%
2016	19,133,533	▼1%	41,281,937	▼2%	60,415,470	▼1%
2015	19,333,873	▲4%	41,998,251	▲10%	61,332,124	▲8%
2014	18,542,295	▲8%	38,152,871	▲12%	56,695,166	▲11%
2013	17,218,672	▲13%	34,079,118	▲14%	51,297,790	▲14%
2012	15,279,655	▲14%	29,812,307	▲24%	45,091,962	▲21%
2011	13,421,536	▲14%	23,973,158	▲18%	37,394,694	▲16%
2010	11,800,833	▲3%	20,342,986	▲11%	32,143,819	▲8%
2009	11,416,838	▼1%	18,396,050	▲8%	29,812,888	▲4%
2008	11,484,063	▲20%	17,069,069	▲26%	28,553,132	▲23%
2007	9,595,923	▲6%	13,600,306	▲12%	23,196,229	▲9%
2006	9,091,693	▲21%	12,174,281	▲3%	21,265,974	▲10%
2005	7,512,282	▲39%	11,781,487	▲16%	19,293,769	▲24%
2004	5,430,925	▲70%	10,169,676	▲14%	15,600,601	▲29%
2003	3,196,045	▲12%	8,908,268	▲5%	12,104,342	▲7%
2002	2,851,487	▼24%	8,506,204	▼4%	11,357,691	▲10%
2001	3,773,699	▼27%	8,827,732	▼7%	12,601,431	▼14%
2000	5,181,845	Steady	9,465,965	Steady	14,647,810	Steady

=== Movements ===
İstanbul–Atatürk International Airport Aircraft Movement Statistics
Year	Domestic	% change	International	% change	Total	% change
2025	16,035	▼2%	12,712	▲7%	28,747	▲2%
2024	16,331	▲7%	11,902	▲20%	28,233	▲12%
2023	15,283	▼5%	9,922	▼19%	25,205	▼11%
2022	16,027	▲20%	12,245	▼56%	28,272	▼31%
2021	13,327	▲30%	27,705	▲2%	41,032	▲10%
2020	10,248	▼73%	27,220	▼73%	37,468	▼73%
2019	38,604	▼72%	99,675	▼70%	138,279	▼70%
2018	136,005	▼5%	328,641	▲3%	464,646	▲1%
2017	142,451	▲1%	318,334	▼2%	460,785	▼1%
2016	141,361	▼2%	325,035	▲1%	466,396	▲0%
2015	143,958	▼1%	320,816	▲9%	464,774	▲6%
2014	144,771	▲4%	294,761	▲10%	439,532	▲8%
2013	139,043	▲9%	267,274	▲13%	406,317	▲12%
2012	127,013	▲7%	237,309	▲15%	364,322	▲12%
2011	118,588	▲13%	206,621	▲13%	325,209	▲13%
2010	104,662	▼3%	183,584	▲4%	288,246	▲2%
2009	108,252	▼5%	175,701	▲9%	283,953	▲3%
2008	114,176	▼1%	161,972	▲11%	276,148	▲5%
2007	115,820	Steady	146,428	Steady	262,248	Steady

== Accidents and incidents ==
- On 30 January 1975, Turkish Airlines Flight 345, crashed into the Sea of Marmara during its final approach to the airport. All 42 passengers and crew on board were killed.
- On 24 April 1998, an engine of an Ilyushin Il-62M (registered YR-IRD) exploded shortly before take-off of the aircraft, which was operating a passenger flight from Istanbul Atatürk Airport on behalf of Trans-Asia. Due to the ensuing fire, the aircraft was damaged beyond repair. All 64 passengers and 9 crew members on board survived.
- On 25 April 2015, Turkish Airlines Flight 1878, operated by an A320-200, TC-JPE was severely damaged in a landing accident. The aircraft aborted the first hard landing, which inflicted engine and gear damage. On the second attempt at landing, the right gear collapsed and the aircraft rolled off the runway spinning 180 degrees. All 97 passengers and 5 crew members survived with no injuries. The aircraft was written off as a result of the accident.
- On 28 June 2016, three terrorists killed 44 civilians by gunfire and subsequent suicide bombings, along with 239 civilians injured. The three men arrived in a taxi cab and opened fire at the terminal. The three men then blew themselves up when police opened fire. The airport has X-ray scanners at the entrance to the terminal but security checks for cars are limited.
- On 15 July 2016, the 2016 Turkish coup d'état attempt took place. During the attempted coup, units of the Turkish Armed Forces seized control of the airport and closed it, but it was reopened after pro-government forces regained control.

== Accolades ==
- The Turkish Chamber of Civil Engineers lists İstanbul Atatürk Airport as one of the fifty civil engineering feats in Turkey, a list of remarkable engineering projects completed in the first 50 years of the chamber's existence.
- In the 2013 Air Transport News awards ceremony, İstanbul Atatürk Airport was named Airport of the Year.
- The airport was named Europe's Best Airport in the 40–50 million passenger per year category at the 2013 Skytrax World Airport Awards.

== See also ==
- List of the busiest airports in Turkey
- List of the busiest airports in Europe
- List of the busiest airports in Europe (2010–2015)
