= Karadeniz Technical University =

Public university in Trabzon, Turkey

Coordinates: 40°59′32.74″N 39°46′06.11″E

- Karadeniz Teknik Üniversitesi
- Type: Public technical university
- Established: 20 May 1955; 71 years ago
- Affiliations: EUA
- President: Hamdullah Çuvalcı
- Academic staff: 2,159
- Students: 31,858
- Location: Trabzon, Turkey
- Language: Turkish
- Colors: Midnight Blue
- Website: www.ktu.edu.tr/en

Karadeniz Technical University (Turkish: Karadeniz Teknik Üniversitesi or KTÜ) is a public research university located in Trabzon, in the Black Sea Region of Turkey. Established in 1955, it is the fourth oldest university in the country. (Note: Founded on the same day with the Ege University.) As a public institution, it operates under the Law No. 2547 on Higher Education in Turkey and is primarily funded through allocations from the Turkish Parliament.

The university comprises 12 faculties, 80 departments, and 6 graduate schools. With a teaching staff of 2,159 and a student body of 31,858, Karadeniz Technical University is among the largest universities in Turkey.

== History ==
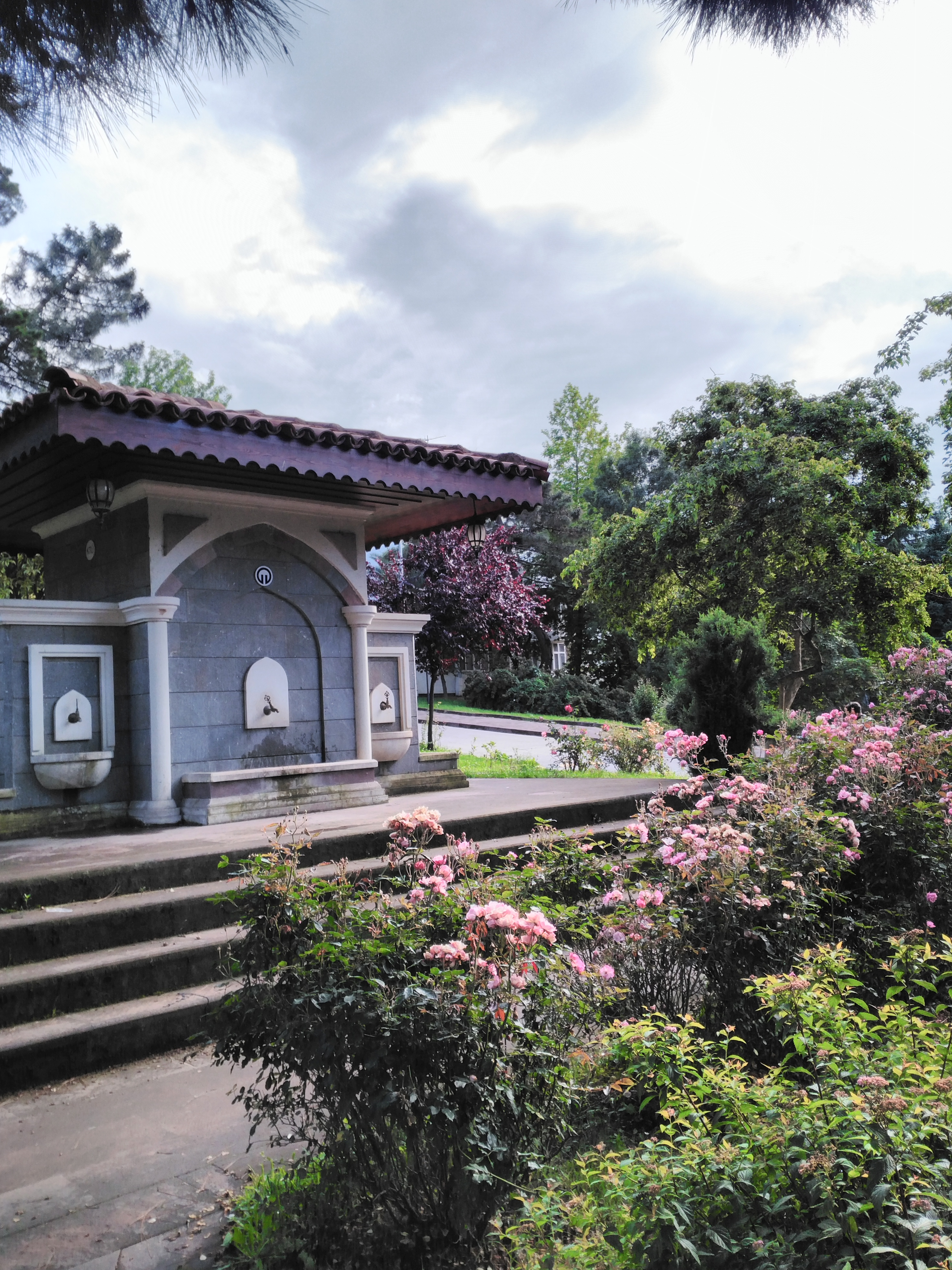
A glimpse of Karadeniz Technical University’s campus

Karadeniz Technical University (KTU), founded on May 20, 1955, is the fourth oldest university in Turkey and the first established outside İstanbul and Ankara. On September 19, 1963, the university formally established its foundational faculties: Natural Sciences, Civil Engineering-Architecture, Mechanical and Electrical Engineering, and Forestry. Educational activities began on December 2, 1963. Since its inception, the university's campus has expanded significantly, evolving into a green space that includes woodlands, playing fields, and facilities for social, cultural, and sports activities.

The university continued to grow with the addition of the Faculties of Earth Sciences and Medicine in 1973. A secondary campus, located 12 km from the main site, was developed to house the Faculty of Education, which offers programs across a wide range of teaching disciplines. Recent expansions include the establishment of the Faculties of Communication and Dentistry.

== Language of instruction ==
Faculty of Mechanical Engineering at Karadeniz Technical University

The primary language of instruction at KTU is Turkish. However, in response to growing demand, the university has introduced measures to increase the availability of courses taught in English. Recent initiatives include the implementation of an Obligatory English Preparatory Programme for select departments, requiring students to demonstrate English proficiency before beginning their degree programs. Currently, up to 30% of courses in departments with an English preparatory year are offered in English, and some postgraduate courses are also taught in English. Detailed information about courses and their language of instruction is available in the information packages of each department.

For exchange students, separate classes in English can be arranged upon request. Additionally, exchange students are encouraged to include a Basic Turkish Language course in their learning agreement.

== ECTS credit allocation ==
View highlighting the infrastructure and natural surroundings of the Karadeniz Technical University campus

ECTS credits for each course at Karadeniz Technical University are calculated based on the actual student workload. This process involves several steps, including defining the objectives and learning outcomes of each course, identifying the activities required to achieve these outcomes on a semester basis, and estimating the time needed for both in-class and out-of-class activities. To ensure accuracy, course directors (lecturers and instructors) provide initial estimates, which are then validated through surveys conducted with successful students after completing the course. The average values, excluding outliers, are used to produce a more reliable estimate.

The total time required for all courses in a program is then summed up to determine the true workload for a semester, which typically ranges from 750 to 800 hours over a 17-week term, including the exam period. This total workload is proportionally distributed among the courses in the program to calculate their respective ECTS credits, equating to approximately 25 hours of workload per credit. However, in the faculties of Medicine and Dentistry, the student workload is significantly higher due to the extensive laboratory and clinical exercises, as well as dental model production requirements in the Dentistry program.

== Academic recognition ==
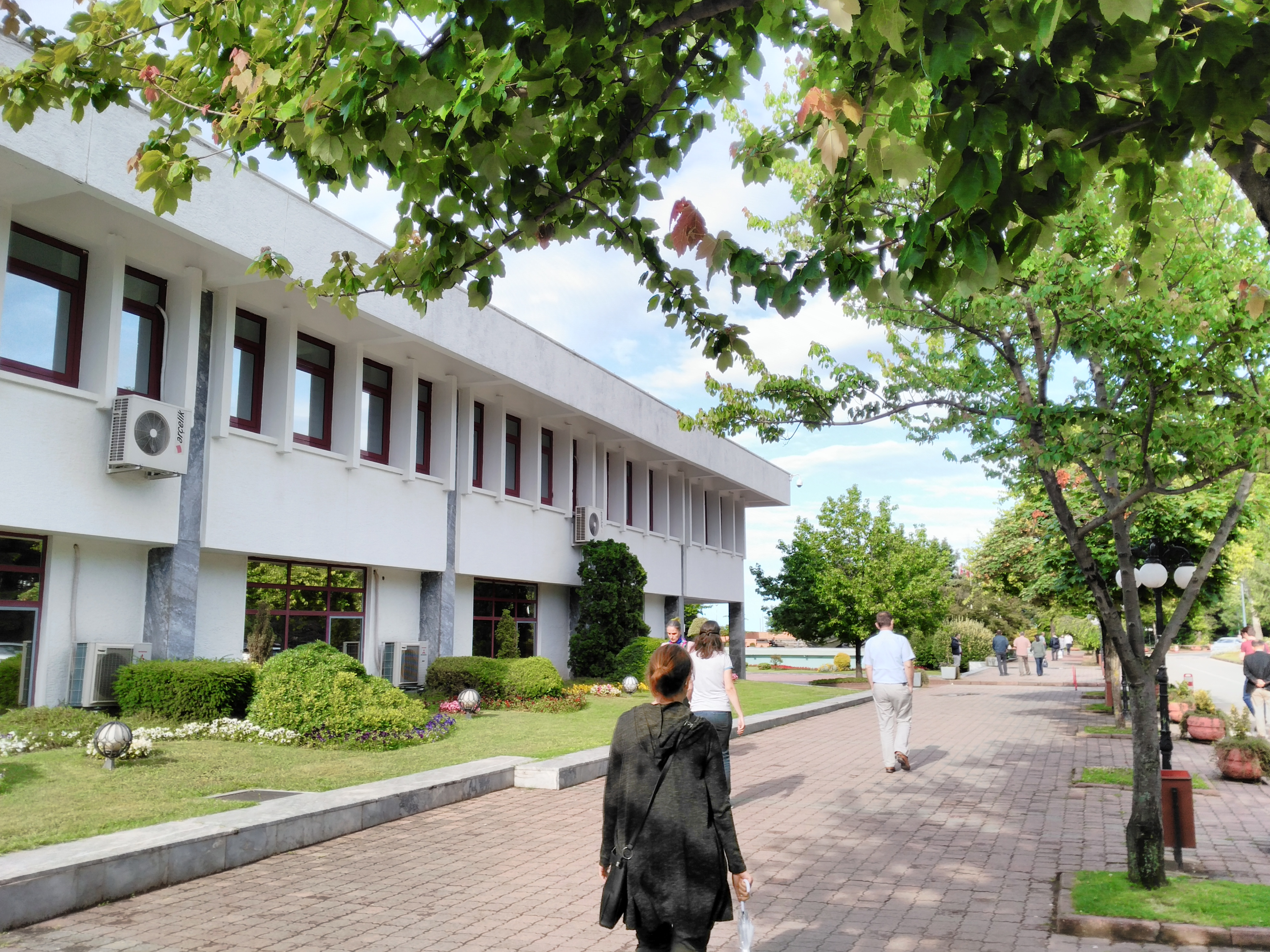
View of the Karadeniz Technical University campus from within its grounds

As part of its integration into the European Higher Education Area, Karadeniz Technical University ensures the recognition of credits earned at partner higher education institutions with which it has bilateral agreements. This is contingent upon the pre-approval of courses by the departmental committee. Students intending to study abroad under the Erasmus+ programme are required to have their learning agreements approved by their departments before applying to the host institution. The signed learning agreement guarantees that credits earned during the exchange will be recognized and reflected in the student’s transcript as courses taken abroad.

To facilitate this process, students must also prepare a course equivalence document. This document outlines the courses to be taken abroad and their corresponding equivalent courses at Karadeniz Technical University. It is signed by the student, the department's recognition committee (comprising the department head, the Erasmus+ coordinator, and the staff member responsible for course equivalence), and the dean, following approval by the faculty board. This signed and stamped document ensures that the courses to be taken abroad will be recognized as stated.

== Campus ==
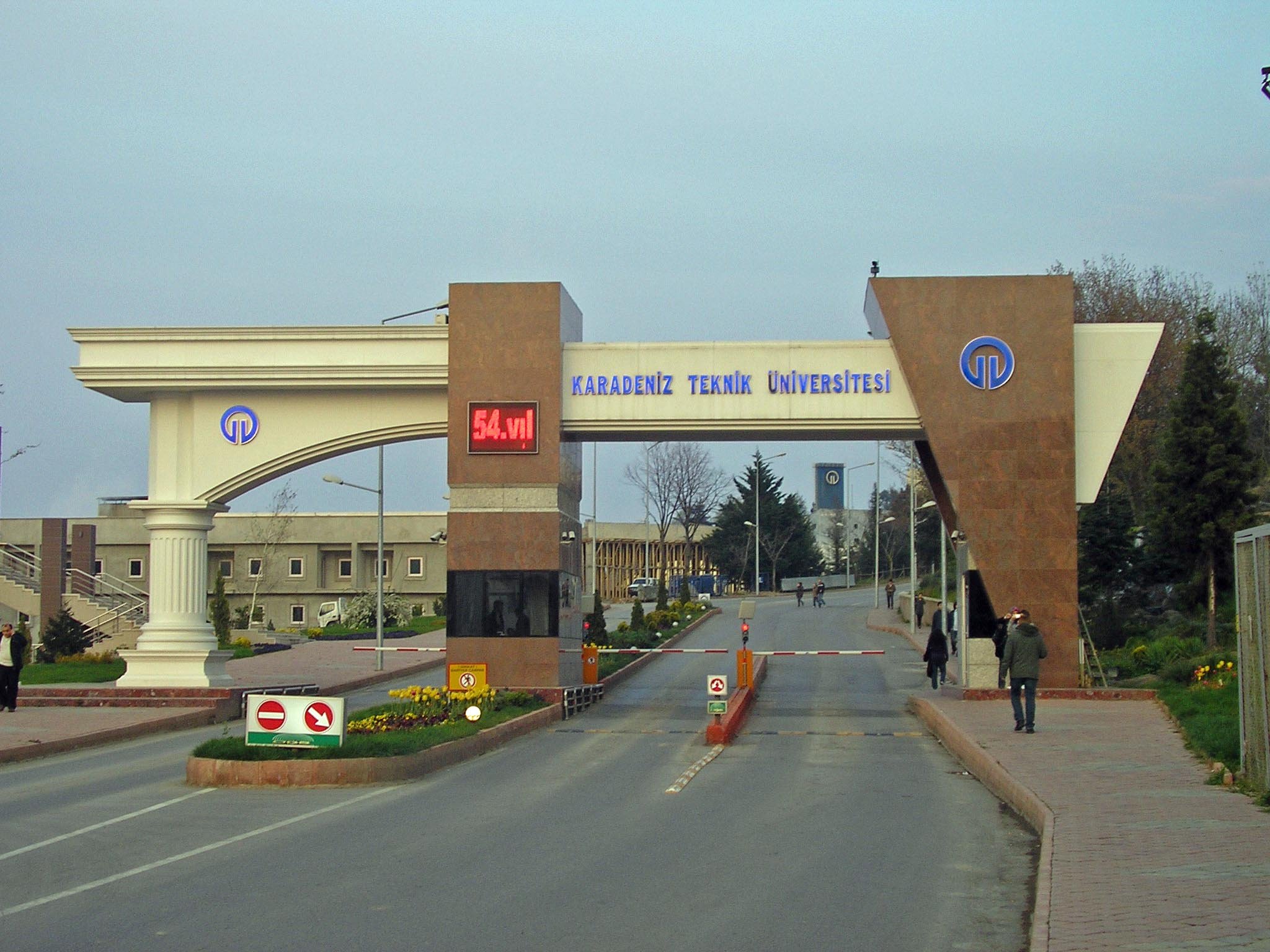
Main entrance gate of Karadeniz Technical University

An aerial view of Karadeniz Technical University

=== Kanuni Main Campus ===
- Rectorate
- Atatürk Culture Center
- Faik Ahmet Barutçu Library
- Faculty of Engineering
- Faculty of Sciences
- Faculty of Letters
- Faculty of Architecture
- Faculty of Forestry
- Faculty of Economics and Administrative Sciences
- Faculty of Medicine
- Faculty of Health Sciences
- Faculty of Dentistry
- Faculty of Pharmacy
- Faculty of Fine Arts
- School of Foreign Languages
- Heath Services Vocational Junior College
- Institute of Social Sciences
- Institute of Science and Technology
- Institute of Medical Sciences
- Black Sea Research Institute
- Institute of Forensic Sciences
- Research centers
- Trabzon School of Health Sciences

=== Sürmene Campus ===
- Sürmene Faculty of Marine Sciences
- Abdullah Kanca Vocational Junior College

=== Muammer Dereli Campus ===
- Sürmene Faculty of Marine Sciences
- Maritime Transport
- Department of Maritime Transport
- Management Engineering

=== Beşikdüzü Campus ===
- Beşikdüzü Vocational Junior College

=== Of Campus ===
- Of Faculty of Technology

=== Vakfıkebir Campus ===
- Vakfıkebir Vocational Junior College

=== Maçka Campus ===
- Maçka Vocational Junior College

=== Arsin Campus ===
- Arsin Vocational Junior College

=== Coast Campus ===
- Marine Science and Technology Institute
- Coastal Recreational Facilities

== Organisation ==
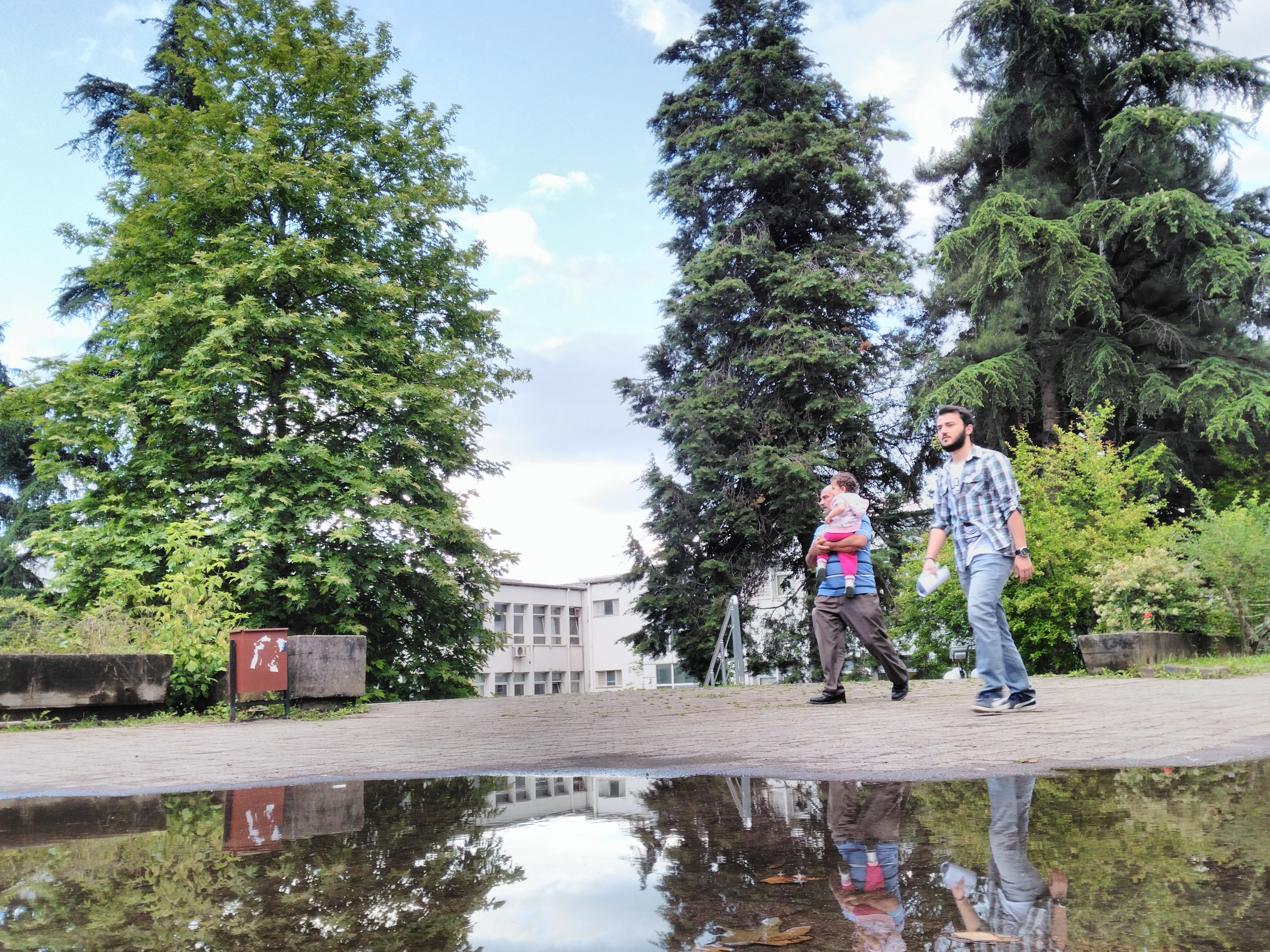
Scene from within the Karadeniz Technical University campus

Department of Chemistry at Karadeniz Technical University

=== Faculties ===
- Faculty of Architecture
- Faculty of Dentistry
- Faculty of Economics and Administrative Sciences
- Faculty of Engineering
- Faculty of Forestry
- Faculty of Marine Sciences
- Faculty of Medicine
- Faculty of Health Sciences
- Faculty of Science
- Faculty of Letters
- Faculty of Technology

=== Colleges ===
- Abdullah Kanca Vocational Junior College
- Arsin Vocational Junior College
- Beşikdüzü Vocational Junior College
- Heath Services Vocational Junior College
- Maçka Vocational Junior College
- Trabzon Vocational College
- Vakfıkebir Vocational Junior College

=== Institutions ===
- Institute of Education Sciences
- Institute of Health Sciences
- Institute of Science and Technology
- Institute of Social Sciences
- Institute of Forensic Sciences
- Black Sea Research Institute
- Marine Science and Technology Institute

=== Research and application centers ===
- History of Atatürk's Principles and Reforms Research Center
- Computer Sciences Research Center
- Computer Aided Design-Engineering and Production Research Center
- Geographical Information Systems Research Center
- Environmental Issues Research Center
- Sea Ecology Research Center
- Electronic Communication Systems Research Center
- Hazelnut - Tea Research Center
- Patient Rights Research Center
- Landslide Research Center
- Women Research Center
- Suleiman the Magnificent Research Center
- Organ Transplant Education Research Center
- Black Sea, Caucasus and Central Asian Studies Research Center
- Materials Science and Production Technology Research Center
- Preschool Education Research Center
- Saadettin Güner Fuel Research Center
- Forestry Research Center
- Foreign Languages Teaching Research Center
- Strategic Research Center
- Continuing Education Research Center
- Turkish Studies Research Center
- Distance Education Research Center
- Foreign Language Teaching Research Center

== International Perspective ==
The Best Global Universities Ranking of the U.S. News & World Report ranks KTU 1100th in the world and 574th in the subject area "Engineering" as of 2019.

In the recent Academic Ranking of World Universities 2018/2019, KTU is ranked at 201-300th in "Civil Engineering", 301-400th in "Mechanical Engineering", and 401-500th in "Chemical Engineering.

By CWTS Leiden Ranking 2019, KTU is ranked at 818th (overall), 681st in "Biomedical and Health Sciences", 596th in "Life and Earth Sciences", 690th in "Mathematics and Computer Science" and 656th in "Physical Sciences and Engineering".

By URAP 2019, KTU is ranked at 1135th (overall), 756th in the broad subject area "Engineering", 378th in "Civil Engineering" and 897th in "Medical and Health Sciences".

== Affiliations ==
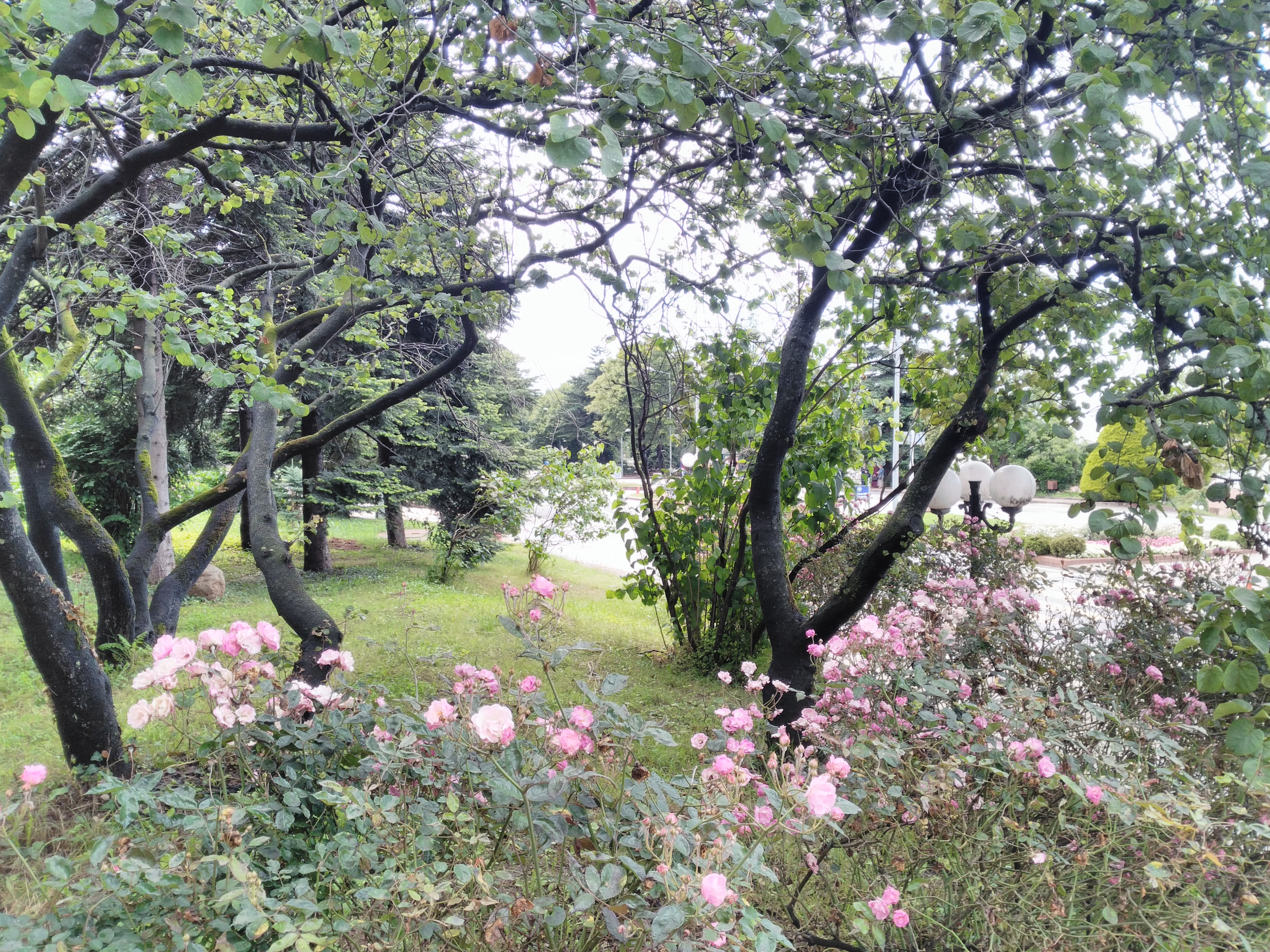
View of the Karadeniz Technical University campus, featuring its academic buildings and surrounding green areas

Karadeniz Technical University has actively engaged in international cooperation since its establishment, with significant growth in recent years in staff and student exchanges with institutions in Japan, the Central Asian Turkic republics, the United States, and various European countries.

As one of the first universities in Turkey to join the Erasmus Program, the university partnered with Ghent University in Belgium and obtained its Erasmus Charter in 2003 (Charter No: 221082-IC-1-2003-1-TR-ERASMUS-EUCX-1). Since then, the number of bilateral agreements, as well as incoming and outgoing exchange students, has steadily increased. The university aims to balance the number of students it sends abroad with those it receives. To support incoming students, Karadeniz Technical University matches them with Turkish hosts, who assist in acclimating to the new environment and ensuring their stay is both exciting and rewarding. Additionally, Karadeniz Technical University is a member of the Caucasus University Association.

== Notable alumni ==
- Şenol Güneş — Turkish football manager
- Sani Şener — Co-founder and CEO of TAV Airports Holding and TAV Construction
- Nilüfer Çınar Çorlulu, — Woman International Master (WIM) of chess
- Kutbettin Arzu — Former Minister of Food, Agriculture and Livestock
- Adil Karaismailoğlu — Minister of Transport and Infrastructure
- Mehmet Cahit Turhan — Former Minister of Transport and Infrastructure
- Mustafa Demir — Former Minister of Public Works and Housing
- Faruk Nafız Özak — Former Minister of Public Works and Housing
- Koray Aydın — Former Minister of Public Works and Housing
- Osman Pepe — Former Minister of Environment and Forestry
- Nazan Bekiroğlu — Turkish novelist and academician
- Yasemin Özata Çetinkaya — Turkish civil servant
- Yakup Şener — Turkish boxer
- Zeliha Şimşek — Turkish women's footballer and trainer
- Fatih Keleş — European champion Turkish amateur boxer
- Selçuk Aydın — European champion Turkish professional boxer
- Meltem Akar — Turkish boxer
- Necla Akdoğan — Former women's footballer and referee
- Olivier Uwishema — Rwandan health researcher

== See also ==
- List of forestry universities and colleges
